= List of Monty Python projects =

The Monty Python comedy troupe branched off into a variety of different media after the success of their sketch comedy television series, Monty Python's Flying Circus.

== Television ==
- Monty Python's Flying Circus (1969–1974)
- Monty Python's Fliegender Zirkus (1972)
- Parrot Sketch Not Included – 20 Years of Monty Python (1989)
- Monty Python Live at Aspen (1998)
- Python Night – 30 Years of Monty Python (1999)
- Monty Python's Personal Best (2006)

== Films ==
- And Now for Something Completely Different (1971)
- Monty Python and the Holy Grail (1975)
- Monty Python's Life of Brian (1979)
- Monty Python Live at the Hollywood Bowl (1982)
- Monty Python's The Meaning of Life (1983)

== Books ==
The following official Monty Python books authored by the team members have been published, mostly in large format:

- Monty Python's Big Red Book (1971) – Hardcover and paperback. Covers vary.
- The Brand New Monty Python Bok (1973) (Paperback edition issued as The Brand New Monty Python Papperbok)
- Monty Python and the Holy Grail (Book) (1977) (First draft and shooting scripts, with Gilliam pictures, lobby cards, stills, correspondence and cost breakdown – the film script later republished separately as a standard paperback)
- Monty Python's The Life of Brian/MONTYPYTHONSCRAPBOOK (1979) (Expanded film script plus a lot of extra material published back-to-back with it – the film script later published separately as a standard paperback)
- The Complete Works of Shakespeare and Monty Python: Vol. 1 – Monty Python (1981) (a repackaging of both the Big Red Book and the Brand New Bok)
- Monty Python's The Meaning of Life (1983) (Expanded film script with photos)
- The Monty Python Gift Boks (1986) (Reissues of paperback editions of Big Red Book and the Brand New Papperbok wrapped in a mini poster)
- Monty Python's Flying Circus: Just the Words (1989) (Mostly complete transcripts of all 4 television series. Originally published in two volumes)
- The Fairly Incomplete & Rather Badly Illustrated Monty Python Song Book (1994)
- Monty Python's Fliegender Zirkus – Sämtliche Deutschen Shows (1998) (Germany-only scriptbook for the two Fliegender Zirkus specials)
- A Pocketful of Python – Picked by Terry Jones (1999) (Terry Jones's favourite Python moments.)
- A Pocketful of Python – Picked by John Cleese (1999) (John Cleese's favourite Python moments.)
- A Pocketful of Python – Picked by Terry Gilliam (2000) (Terry Gilliam's favourite Python moments.)
- A Pocketful of Python – Picked by Michael Palin (2000) (Michael Palin's favourite Python moments.)
- A Pocketful of Python – Picked by Eric Idle (2002) (Eric Idle's favourite Python moments.)
- The Pythons Autobiography by The Pythons (2003) (Edited by Bob McCabe – a large-format, illustrated coffee table book, oral history of Monty Python told through collection of interviews from Python members and friends; later reissued as small, text-only paperback.)
- The Very Best of Monty Python (2006) (Full-colour paperback combining the five volumes of A Pocketful of Python)
- Monty Python Live! (2009) (A combination of oral history and new Python comedy book including the complete illustrated libretto of Python's live shows)

== Records ==
Monty Python discography
- Studio albums: 4
- Soundtrack albums: 3
- Live albums: 3
- Compilation albums: 4
- Singles: 13
- Video albums: 3
- Box sets: 7

=== Albums ===
==== Studio albums ====
Title	Album details	Peak chart positions			
Title	Album details	UK	AUS	NZ	US
Another Monty Python Record	Released: 8 October 1971; Label: Charisma; Formats: LP, MC	26	—	—	—
Monty Python's Previous Record	Released: 8 December 1972; Label: Charisma; Formats: LP, MC	39	—	—	—
The Monty Python Matching Tie and Handkerchief	Released: 7 December 1973; Label: Charisma; Formats: LP, MC, 8-track	49	82	—	48
Monty Python's Contractual Obligation Album	Released: 6 October 1980; Label: Charisma; Formats: LP, MC	13	3	23	164
"—" denotes releases that did not chart or were not released in that territory.

==== Live albums ====
Title	Album details	Peak chart positions	
Title	Album details	UK	US
Monty Python's Flying Circus	Released: 6 November 1970; Label: BBC; Formats: LP, MC, 8-track	—	83 (Note: Peak position upon re-release in 1975)
Monty Python Live at Drury Lane	Released: 28 June 1974; Label: Charisma; Formats: LP, MC, 8-track	19	—
Monty Python Live at City Center	Released: 3 May 1976; Label: Arista; Formats: LP, MC, 8-track; US-only release	—	186
"—" denotes releases that did not chart or were not released in that territory.

==== Soundtrack albums ====
Title	Album details	Peak chart positions			
Title	Album details	UK	AUS	NZ	US
The Album of the Soundtrack of the Trailer of the Film of Monty Python and the Holy Grail	Released: 18 July 1975; Label: Charisma; Formats: LP, MC, 8-track	45	—	—	87
Monty Python's Life of Brian	Released: 8 October 1979; Label: Warner Bros.; Formats: LP, MC	63	11	—	155
Monty Python's The Meaning of Life	Released: 5 April 1983; Label: MCA, CBS; Formats: LP, MC	—	46	45	—
"—" denotes releases that did not chart or were not released in that territory.

==== Compilation albums ====
Title	Album details	Peak chart positions			
Title	Album details	UK	AUT	GER	SWI
The Monty Python Instant Record Collection	Released: 2 December 1977; Label: Charisma; Formats: LP, MC	—	—	—	—
The Final Rip Off	Released: 30 November 1987; Label: Virgin; Formats: 2×CD, 2×LP, 2×MC	—	—	—	—
Monty Python Sings	Released: 11 December 1989; Label: Virgin; Formats: CD, LP, MC	35 (Note: Monty Python Sings did not originally chart in 1989. Upon reissue in 1992, it peaked at number 62 on the UK Albums Chart, and in 2014, an expanded release entitled Monty Python Sings (Again) peaked at number 35.)	19 (Note: Chart peak upon re-release in 1991.)	21	33
The Ultimate Monty Python Rip Off	Released: 3 October 1994; Label: Virgin; Formats: CD	—	—	—	—
"—" denotes releases that did not chart or were not released in that territory.

==== Box sets ====
Title	Album details
All of the Worst of Monty Python	Released: 1980; Label: Charisma; Formats: 7×LP; Australasia-only release
The Instant Monty Python CD Collection	Released: 3 October 1994; Label: Virgin; Formats: 6×CD
At the Movies	Released: 2000; Label: Disky; Formats: 3×CD
Another Monty Python Box	Released: April 2002; Label: Disky; Formats: 3×CD
The Pythons Autobiography by The Pythons – The Interviews That Made The Book	Released: 15 September 2003; Label: Audio Renaissance; Formats: 2×CD
Monty Python’s Total Rubbish – The Complete Collection	Released: 30 June 2014; Label: Virgin; Formats: 9×CD+7", 9×LP+7"
Live (Mostly) – One Down Five to Go	Released: 10 November 2014; Label: Eagle Vision/Universal Music; Formats: 2×CD+DVD

=== Singles ===
Title	Year	Peak chart positions									Album
Title	Year	UK	AUS	AUT	BEL (FLA)	GER	IRE	NL	NOR	SWI	Album
"Spam Song"	1972	—	—	—	—	—	—	—	—	—	Another Monty Python Record
"Eric the Half a Bee"	1972	—	—	—	—	—	—	—	—	—	Monty Python's Previous Record
"Teach Yourself Heath" (flexi disc release)	1972	—	—	—	—	—	—	—	—	—	Non-album single
Monty Python's Tiny Black Round Thing (flexi disc release)	1974	—	—	—	—	—	—	—	—	—	Monty Python Live at Drury Lane
"The Single" (US-only release)	1975	—	—	—	—	—	—	—	—	—	Non-album singles
"Lumberjack Song"	1975	52 (Note: Chart position is from the official UK "Breakers List".)	—	—	—	—	—	—	—	—	Non-album singles
Python on Song	1976	53	—	—	—	—	—	—	—	—	Non-album singles
"Brian" / "Always Look on the Bright Side of Life" (Note: Although released as a double A-sided single in the UK, elsewhere "Always Look on the Bright Side of Life" was released as the A-side with "Brian" the B-side.)	1979	—	— 9	—	— 30	—	—	— 34	—	—	Monty Python's Life of Brian
"I Like Chinese"	1980	—	32	—	—	—	—	—	—	—	Monty Python's Contractual Obligation Album
"Galaxy Song"	1983	77	—	—	—	—	—	—	—	—	Monty Python's The Meaning of Life
"Always Look on the Bright Side of Life" (reissue)	1991	3	119	2	35	3	1	—	5	3	Monty Python Sings
"I Like Chinese" (Germany-only reissue)	1992	—	—	—	—	67	—	—	—	—	Monty Python Sings
"Galaxy Song" (with Stephen Hawking)	2015	—	—	—	—	—	—	—	—	—	Non-album single
"—" denotes releases that did not chart or were not released in that territory.

== Documentaries ==
- Film Night – On Location with Monty Python and the Holy Grail (BBC2, 1974)
- The Pythons (BBC1, 1979)
- The Meaning of Monty Python's Meaning of Life (ITV, 1983)
- Life of Python (US version) (Showtime, 1990)
- Life of Python (UK version) (BBC1, 1990)
- 30 Years of Monty Python – A Revelation (Paramount Comedy Channel, 1999)
- It's...The Monty Python Story (BBC Two, 1999)
- Pythonland (BBC Two, 1999)
- From Spam To Sperm – Monty Python's Greatest Hits (BBC Two, 1999)
- The Quest for the Holy Grail Locations (DVD, 2001)
- The Meaning of Making The Meaning of Life (DVD, 2003)
- Comedy Connections – Monty Python's Flying Circus (BBC One, 2005)
- The Secret Life of Brian (Channel 4, 2007)
- What The Pythons Did Next... (Channel 4, 2007)
- The Story of Brian (Alternate extended edit of The Secret Life of Brian) (DVD/Blu-ray, 2007)
- Before the Flying Circus (DVD, 2008)
- Monty Python Conquers America (DVD, 2008)
- Movie Connections – Monty Python and the Holy Grail (BBC One, 2009)
- Monty Python: Almost the Truth (Lawyers Cut) (DVD/Blu-ray, 2009)
- The Meaning of Monty Python (Blu-ray, 2013)
- Monty Python: And Now for Something Rather Similar (BBC One, 2014)
- Monty Python: The Meaning of Live (UKTV Gold, 2014)
- Python at 50: Silly Talks and Holy Grails (BBC Two, 2019)

== Stage productions ==
- Spamalot (2004)
- Not the Messiah (He's a Very Naughty Boy) (2007)
- An Evening Without Monty Python (2009)
- Monty Python Live (Mostly) (2014)

== Games ==
=== Computer and video games ===
- Monty Python's Flying Circus: The Computer Game (1991)
- Monty Python's Complete Waste of Time (1994)
- Live With(out) Monty Python (1994)
- Monty Python's More Naughty Bits (1994)
- Monty Python's Invasion from the Planet Skyron (1995)
- Monty Python & the Quest for the Holy Grail (1996)
- Monty Python's The Meaning of Life (1997)

=== Tabletop games ===
- Monty Python’s Cocurricular Mediaeval Reenactment Programme (2025)

== Other collaborations outside Monty Python ==
In addition to their work as a group, the six members have collaborated with each other on numerous other film and television projects outside Monty Python.

Year	Title	Director(s)	Graham Chapman	John Cleese	Terry Gilliam	Eric Idle	Terry Jones	Michael Palin
1969	The Magic Christian	Joseph McGrath	Yes	Yes				
1970	The Rise and Rise of Michael Rimmer	Kevin Billington	Yes	Yes				
1971	The Statue	Rod Amateau	Yes	Yes				
1977	Jabberwocky	Terry Gilliam			Yes		Yes	Yes
1978	All You Need Is Cash	Eric Idle; Gary Weis				Yes		Yes
1981	Time Bandits	Terry Gilliam		Yes	Yes			Yes
1983	The Crimson Permanent Assurance	Terry Gilliam	Yes		Yes	Yes	Yes	Yes
1983	Yellowbeard	Mel Damski	Yes	Yes		Yes		
1985	Brazil	Terry Gilliam			Yes			Yes
1988	A Fish Called Wanda	Charles Crichton		Yes				Yes
1988	The Adventures of Baron Munchausen	Terry Gilliam			Yes	Yes		
1989	Erik the Viking	Terry Jones		Yes			Yes	
1993	Splitting Heirs	Robert Young		Yes		Yes		
1996	The Wind in the Willows	Terry Jones		Yes		Yes	Yes	Yes
1997	Fierce Creatures	Robert Young; Fred Schepisi		Yes				Yes
2002	Pinocchio	Roberto Benigni		Yes		Yes		
2003	Concert for George	David Leland			Yes	Yes	Yes	Yes
2006	Who Is Harry Nilsson (And Why Is Everybody Talkin' About Him)?	John Scheinfeld			Yes	Yes		
2006	Locked Out	Albert Dupontel			Yes		Yes	
2007	Shrek the Third	Chris Miller		Yes		Yes		
2011	George Harrison: Living in the Material World	Martin Scorsese			Yes	Yes		
2012	A Liar's Autobiography: The Untrue Story of Monty Python's Graham Chapman	Bill Jones; Jeff Simpson; Ben Timlett	Yes	Yes	Yes		Yes	Yes
2015	Absolutely Anything	Terry Jones		Yes	Yes	Yes	Yes	Yes
