= Monty Python discography =

- Studio albums: 7
- Live albums: 3
- Compilation albums: 7
- Singles: 11

This is a comprehensive discography of official audio recordings by Monty Python, a British comedy troupe formed in 1969.

== Albums ==
=== Studio albums ===
Title	Details	Peak chart positions					Certifications
Title	Details	UK	AUS	NZ	US	US Com.	Certifications
Another Monty Python Record	Released on 8 October 1971 by Charisma	26	—	—	—	—	
Monty Python's Previous Record	Released on 8 December 1972 by Charisma	39	—	—	—	—	
The Monty Python Matching Tie and Handkerchief	Released on 7 December 1973 by Charisma	49	82	—	48	—	
The Album of the Soundtrack of the Trailer of the Film of Monty Python and the Holy Grail	Released on 18 July 1975 by Charisma	—	—	—	87	5	
Monty Python's Life of Brian	Released on 8 October 1979 by Warner Bros.	63	11	—	155	—	
Monty Python's Contractual Obligation Album	Released on 6 October 1980 by Charisma	13	3	23	164	10	ARIA: Platinum
Monty Python's The Meaning of Life	Released on 5 April 1983 by MCA	—	46	45	—	—	

=== Compilation albums ===
Title	Details	Peak chart positions					
Title	Details	UK	AUT	GER	SWI	US Com.	Certifications
The Monty Python Instant Record Collection	Released on 2 December 1977 by Charisma/Arista	—	—	—	—	—	
The Final Rip Off	Released on 30 November 1987 by Virgin	—	—	—	—	—	
Monty Python Sings	Released on 11 December 1989 by Virgin	62	19	21	33	—	UK: Gold
The Ultimate Monty Python Rip Off	Released on 3 October 1994 by Virgin	—	—	—	—	—	
The Instant Monty Python CD Collection	Released on 3 October 1994 by Virgin	—	—	—	—	—	
Monty Python's Total Rubbish	Released on 30 June 2014 by Virgin/Universal	—	—	—	—	—	
Monty Python Sings (Again)	Released on 30 June 2014 by Virgin	35	—	—	—	—	

=== Live albums ===
Title	Details	Peak chart positions			Certifications
Title	Details	UK	US	US Com.	Certifications
Monty Python’s Flying Circus	Released on 6 November 1970 by BBC & Pye	45	83	—	
Live at Drury Lane	Released on 28 June 1974 by Charisma	19	—	—	UK: Silver
Monty Python Live at City Center	Released on 3 May 1976 by Arista	—	186	—	

== Singles ==
=== 1970s ===
Title	Year	Peak chart positions			Album
Title	Year	AUS	BEL	NLD	Album
"Spam"	1972	—	—	—	Another Monty Python Record
"Eric the Half-a-Bee"	1972	—	—	—	Monty Python's Previous Record
"Teach Yourself Heath"	1972	—	—	—	Non-album single
"Monty Python's Tiny Black Round Thing"	1974	—	—	—	Live at Drury Lane
"The Lumberjack Song"	1975	—	—	—	Non-album singles
"Python On Song"	1976	—	—	—	Non-album singles
"Brian Song" / "Always Look on the Bright Side of Life" (Double A-side)	1979	— 9	— 30	— 34	Monty Python's Life of Brian

=== 1980s ===
Title	Year	Peak chart positions			Album
Title	Year	UK	AUS	GER	Album
"I Like Chinese"	1980	—	32	67	Monty Python's Contractual Obligation Album
"Galaxy Song"	1983	77	—	—	Monty Python's The Meaning of Life

=== 1990s ===
Title	Year	Peak chart positions								Certifications	Album
Title	Year	UK	AUS	AUT	BEL	GER	IRL	NOR	SWI	Certifications	Album
"Always Look on the Bright Side of Life" (reissue)	1991	3	119	2	35	3	1	5	3	BPI: Silver	Monty Python's Life of Brian
"Galaxy Song" (reissue)	1991	—	—	—	—	—	—	—	—		Monty Python's The Meaning of Life
