= The Ultimate Monty Python Rip Off =

Compilation album by Monty Python
- Released: 3 October 1994 (UK)
- Recorded: 1971–1983
- Genre: Comedy
- Length: 77:04
- Label: Virgin
- Compiler: Andre Jacquemin

Monty Python chronology
Monty Python Sings (1989)	The Ultimate Monty Python Rip Off (1994)	The Instant Monty Python CD Collection (1994)

The Ultimate Monty Python Rip Off is a compilation album released by Monty Python in 1994 on the occasion of their 25th anniversary. The album contains no previously unreleased material and was released as a sampler for the simultaneous release of The Instant Monty Python CD Collection box set.

== Track listing ==
1. Introduction
2. Finland
3. Travel Agent
4. I Like Chinese
5. French Taunter
6. Australian Table Wines
7. Spanish Inquisition (also contains Famous Person Quiz - not written on album track list)
8. The Galaxy Song
9. Every Sperm is Sacred
10. Grim Reaper
11. Sit on My Face
12. Argument (also contains Cheese Shop - not written on album track list)
13. Mary Queen of Scots
14. Four Yorkshiremen
15. Lumberjack Song
16. Albatross
17. Nudge Nudge
18. Parrot
19. Bruces/Philosophers' Song
20. Fish Licence
21. Eric the Half-a-Bee
22. The Spam Song
23. Big Nose
24. Stoning
25. Link 1
26. Welease Wodger
27. Link 2
28. Always Look on the Bright Side of Life
29. Spanish Inquisition (Ending)

== Distribution information ==
- CD: (1994) Virgin Records, Ltd./Kay Gee Bee Music Ltd. CDV 2748 (UK)
