= Eric Idle Sings Monty Python =

Live album by Eric Idle
- Released: 2000
- Recorded: July 4, 1999; J. Paul Getty Center, Los Angeles, California
- Genre: Comedy

Eric Idle Sings Monty Python is a live recording by original Monty Python member Eric Idle performed at the J. Paul Getty Center in Los Angeles in 1999. The concert runs for under an hour and is packed with songs, poems, and arcana from the then-thirty years of Monty Python, with amusing Idle banter between songs. Idle is accompanied by some background singers, and the audience.

== Reception ==
Professional ratings
Review scores
Source	Rating
AllMusic	4/5 stars

AllMusic reviewer Mark Morgenstein stated "If you like Monty Python, you'll love it; if you don't, you'll hate it. ... Idle's droll voice isn't bad for a comedian, and with his chorus of background singers, it fits the silly tone of the songs well."

== Track listing ==
1. Spam Song - 0:48
2. The Meaning of Life - 3:07
3. Money Song - 2:01
4. Every Sperm is Sacred - 5:20
5. Accountancy Shanty - 1:52
6. Meaning of Life Poem - 2:07
7. I Like Chinese - 5:50
8. The Bruces' Philosophers Song - 2:23
9. Men, Men, Men - 1:24
10. Shopping - 1:07
11. Sit on My Face - 1:19
12. Penis Song (Not the Noel Coward Song) - 0:45
13. All Things Dull and Ugly - 2:02
14. Eric the Half-a-Bee - 3:05
15. One Foot in the Grave - 3:34 (theme to One Foot in the Grave)
16. I Must Be in Love - 3:12 (as Dirk McQuickly)
17. Rock Notes - 2:24
18. Galaxy Song - 3:13
19. Medical Love Song - 3:30
20. Always Look on the Bright Side of Life - 4:17
21. Lumberjack Song - 2:37
22. Liberty Bell - 0:31
