= Monty Python's Total Rubbish =

Box set by Monty Python
- Released: 30 June 2014 (UK)
- Recorded: 1970–1983
- Genre: Comedy
- Label: Virgin/Universal

Monty Python chronology
The Instant Monty Python CD Collection (1994)	Monty Python's Total Rubbish (2014)

Monty Python's Total Rubbish is a 2014 boxed set collecting remastered editions of the nine original albums of British comedy troupe Monty Python on nine CDs or ten LPs. It was released on 30 June 2014.

== Contents ==
- Monty Python's Flying Circus
- Another Monty Python Record
- Monty Python's Previous Record
- Matching Tie and Handkerchief
- Live at Drury Lane
- Monty Python and the Holy Grail
- Monty Python's Life of Brian
- Monty Python's Contractual Obligation Album
- Monty Python's The Meaning of Life
- Monty Python's Tiny Black Round Thing

== Personnel ==
Recorded by, engineer, mixed by, producer, music by, edited by, effects, technician, arranged by: Andre Jacquemin
Edited by, effects, arranged by, mixed by, technician, music by, producers: Terry Gilliam, Dave Howman
Engineer (additional): Alan Bailey
Music by: Eric Idle, Michael Palin, Terry Jones, Fred Tomlison
Arrangements (additional): Fred Tomlison
Produced by: Michael Palin, Terry Jones, Eric Idle, Graham Chapman
Mixed by, produced by: George Harrison (on Lumberjack song)
Performer: Carol Cleveland
Written by, performers: John Cleese, Michael Palin, Terry Jones, Eric Idle, Graham Champman, Terry Gilliam
