= The Monty Python Instant Record Collection =

Compilation album by Monty Python
- Released: 2 December 1977 (UK/Canada Version); 7 December 1981 (US Version)
- Recorded: 1971–1977 (UK Version); 1973–1980 (US Version)
- Genre: Comedy
- Length: 52:05 (UK/Canada) 58:15 (US)
- Label: Charisma (UK) Arista (US)
- Compilers: Andre Jacquemin (UK/Canada); Dennis Fine (US)

Monty Python chronology
Monty Python Live at City Center (1976)	The Monty Python Instant Record Collection (1977)	Monty Python's Life of Brian (1979)

Professional ratings
Review scores
Source	Rating
AllMusic	3/5 stars

The Monty Python Instant Record Collection is the title of two compilation albums by the Monty Python troupe. The first was released in the UK and Canada in 1977 and drew from the group's first three studio albums, first live album, and first soundtrack album on the Charisma label, while the second was released in the US in 1981 and comprised tracks from their four albums released on the Arista label. Billed as "the pick of the best of some recently repeated Python hits again, Vol. II", the record sleeve was designed by Terry Gilliam. The UK/Canadian version originally featured packaging that folded out into a cardboard box resembling a large stack of record albums (all containing spoofs of popular album names). An inner sleeve featured a spoof "Where Are They Now?" update on the members of the Python team.

As ever, the original vinyl release of the UK version had messages from George Peckham on the runout grooves. The first side read: "DEAR MUM, CUTTING ANOTHER PYTHON RECORD. I'LL BE HOME LATE TONIGHT, LUV PORKY", while the second side read: "SPECIAL RECORD NO. 471. RING CHARISMA FOR YOUR PRIZE NOW!".

The only new sketch (on the UK/Canadian versions) is "Summarise Proust Competition" which was originally performed on the television series Monty Python's Flying Circus and was re-recorded for Monty Python's Previous Record but never used, while the Alistair Cooke sketch is preceded by a brief, newly recorded introduction by Michael Palin. Many of the sketches are edited from their original versions.

== Track listing (UK/Canada Version) ==
=== Side one ===
1. Introductions
2. Alistair Cooke
3. Nudge, Nudge
4. Mrs. Nigger-Baiter
5. Constitutional Peasants
6. Fish Licence
7. Eric the Half a Bee
8. Australian Table Wines
9. Silly Noises
10. Novel Writing
11. Elephantoplasty
12. How To Do It
13. Gumby Cherry Orchard
14. Oscar Wilde

=== Side two ===
1. Introduction
2. Argument
3. French Taunter
4. Summarise Proust Competition
5. Cheese Emporium
6. Funerals at Prestatyn
7. Camelot
8. Word Association
9. Bruces
10. Parrot
11. Monty Python Theme

(note that, like many of the Python albums, the CD version of the album contains only two tracks "Side One" and "Side Two". The individual sketches are not selectable).

== Track listing (US Version) ==
=== Side one ===
1. The Executive Intro
2. Pet Shop
3. Nudge Nudge
4. Premiere of Film - Live Broadcast From London
5. Bring Out Your Dead
6. How do you Tell a Witch
7. Camelot
8. Argument Clinic
9. Crunchy Frog
10. The Cheese Shop
11. The Phone-In
12. Sit On My Face

=== Side two ===
1. Another Executive Announcement
2. Bishop on the Landing
3. Elephantoplasty
4. The Lumberjack Song
5. Bookshop
6. Blackmail
7. Farewell to John Denver
8. World Forum
9. String
10. Wide World of Novel Writing
11. Death of Mary Queen of Scots
12. Never Be Rude to an Arab

== Distribution information ==
- LP: (1977, 1983) Charisma CAS 1134 (UK), 9211-1134 (Fold-out)/CA-1-2173 (Standard jacket) (Canada)
- LP: (1981) Arista Records ALB 68296 (U.S.)
- CD: (1989) Virgin Records, Ltd., CASCD 1134 (UK) (budget CD)

== Faux album titles listed on packaging ==
As mentioned above, the record jacket packaging folds out into the shape of a box, with the actual record sleeve being the lid of the box. The remainder of the box appears as a stack of records (the "instant record collection") with one face of the box displaying all the album titles, as listed here:

- ROCK AND ROLL IS HERE TO STAY AGAIN!
- The Beatles Chauffeurs Live!
- RUNNING SONGS AND SURRENDERING BALLADS: THE MASSED BANDS OF THE QUEENS OWN COWARDS (OR SOME OF THEM)
- ETERNALLY YOURS - THE MASSED WINDSCALE MARCHING SCIENTISTS
- Ron Simon and Geoff Garfunkel: Live From The Tennis Club Purley (shows as gold lettering on black record jacket)
- TOGETHER AGAIN - FRANK AND IFIELD
- My Brain Hurts - THE MORON TABERNACLE CHOIR
- THE MILKMAN WHISTLES STOCKHAUSEN - 'A' MILKMAN
- When We're Apart The Legs
- Friday Night Is Bath Night, J.P.Gumby
- WHEN THE CHICKENS ARE ASLEEP - Ramon And Ted
- NIXON'S SOLID GOLD DENIALS
- Norma Shearer Whistles Duane Eddie
- TEACH YOURSELF POWER
- THE BEST BITS OF ROLF HARRIS
- MONTY PYTHON'S BEST SKETCHES BEGINNING WITH 'R'
- HITTING OURSELVES WITH THE LITTLE CURVED BIT ON THE END OF A SHAVING BRUSH - ERIC AND THE LOONIES
- MY BRAIN HURTS AND OTHER NATIONAL FRONT MARCHING SONGS
- The Best of the Ozmonds Teeth - Vol XI
- An Evening with Martin Bormann (and the Trio los Paraguayos)
- A NIGHT IN CASABLANCA - THE EVERLY SISTERS
- Ron Simon and Geoff Garfunkel: Live From The Tennis Club Purley (shows as black lettering on cream record jacket)
- GIVE ME THE MOONLIGHT AND THE GOATS - RAMON AND TED
- A MAN WHO ONCE SOLD PAUL MCARTNEY A NEWSPAPER - LIVE!
- RAW POWER PUNK KILL BLAST THROTTLE DESTROY - CLODAGH ROTTEN
- THE DAVE CLARK FIVE'S WAR SPEECHES
- THE BEST OF REGGAE MAUDLING (RASTATORY LABEL)
- The Wonderful Sound of Hip Injuries
- BEETHOVEN'S PUNK SYMPHONY, IN B FLAT - "THE STINKING BASTARD" (BANDAGES SUPPLIED)
- The Horrid Brothers Kill Anyone in Sight
- Party Time, Princess "Piano" Margaret
- YOUNG, GIFTED, BLACK AND FURRY: RAMON & TED
- My Way Or Else - Frank Sinatra
- ITS ALL OVER MY FRIEND - EARL K VOMIT AND THE METABOLIC PROCESSES
- John, Paul, George And Ringo - The Davenport Brothers
- Scottish Airs - The Hamish McFart Singers
- I LEFT MY PACEMAKER IN SAN FRANCISCO - DR DeBAKEY
- More Songs from the Goole and District Catholic River Wideners Club
- BERNARD DELFONT LIVE AT THE BANK NEXT TO THE LONDON PALLADIUM
- BRIGHT LIGHTS, SOFT MUSIC, LIVE GOATS - RAMON & TED
- FOOTLOOSE AND FANCY FREE - BRITT ECKLAND
- A NIGHT ON THE TOWN - BRITT ECKLAND
- SMILER - BRITT ECKLAND
- GASOLINE ALLEY - BRITT ECKLAND
- NEVER A FULL MOMENT - BRITT ECKLAND
- AN OLD RAINCOAT WON'T EVER LET YOU DOWN - BRITT ECKLAND
- EVERY PICTURE TELLS A STORY - BRITT ECKLAND (shows as black lettering on a yellow record jacket)
- ATLANTIC CROSSING - BRITT ECKLAND
- EVERY PICTURE TELLS A STORY - BRITT ECKLAND (shows as white letting on a black record jacket)
- RASTAMAN - SIR KEITH JOSEPH (deleted)
- I'VE GOT A BEER GLASS STICKING IN MY HEAD AND OTHER RUGBY SONGS
- ACCOUNTANTS WORK SONGS
- RULING SONGS AND BALLADS - H.M. THE QUEEN AND THE JORDANAIRES
- I'M IN THE MOOD FOR LOVE AND GOATS AND CHICKENS: RAMON AND TED
- Pet Smells - The Beach Boys
- MONTY PYTHON TRIES IT ON AGAIN
- BOEING BOEING (cast album)
- BONG BANGY BING!
- BANG GOES BOING!
- BACK IS BING!
- BING IS BACK!
- Tom Jones Hits Frank Sinatra While Vic Damone And Mel Torme Grab Englebert Humperdinck, At Las Vegas
- YOU AND THE NIGHT AND THE MUSIC AND THE CHICKEN: RAMON AND TED
- Get Bach - The Best Of The Welsh Beatles
- THE PIC OF THE BEST OF SOME RECENTLY REPEATED PYTHON HITS AGAIN, VOL II
