= Monty Python: The Meaning of Live =

- Genre: Documentary
- Directed by: Roger Graef; James Rogan
- Starring: John Cleese; Terry Gilliam; Eric Idle; Terry Jones; Michael Palin
- Country of origin: United Kingdom

Production
- Producers: Jim Beach; Holly Gilliam
- Running time: 92 minutes

Original release
- Network: UKTV Gold
- Release: 13 November 2014

Monty Python: The Meaning of Live is a 2014 British documentary telefilm, directed by Roger Graef and James Rogan, about a 10-day series of live performances at London's O_{2} arena. The film features interviews with Monty Python members John Cleese, Terry Gilliam, Eric Idle, Terry Jones and Michael Palin as they perform on stage together for the first time in 34 years. Also appearing are Carol Cleveland, Prof. Brian Cox, Stephen Hawking and Mike Myers. The documentary is dedicated to Graham Chapman.

As well as covering the reunion shows, the documentary recaps the Pythons' live history; from their first stage performance in 1971, to tours of the UK and Canada in 1973, the 1974 Drury Lane shows in London, the 1976 City Center shows in New York and, finally, their 1980 performances at the Hollywood Bowl.

The film features behind-the-scenes footage of the reunion, ranging from the first script reading to dress rehearsals plagued by technical difficulties. Much backstage footage from across the ten nights is shown, as well as film of one of the after-show Q&As. Michael Palin is seen filming a sketch for inclusion in the heavily censored pre-watershed first half of UKTV Gold's live screening of the tenth and final show. The channel aired the documentary on 13 November 2014.

== Cast ==
- John Cleese
- Terry Gilliam
- Eric Idle
- Terry Jones
- Michael Palin
- Carol Cleveland
- Jim Beach
- Brian Cox
- Stephen Hawking
- Holly Gilliam
- Mike Myers
