= The Instant Monty Python CD Collection =

Box set by Monty Python
- Released: 3 October 1994 (UK)
- Recorded: 1971–1983
- Genre: Comedy
- Length: Disc 1: 79 mins Disc 2: 61 mins Disc 3: 62 mins Disc 4: 66 mins Disc 5: 77 mins Disc 6: 53 mins
- Label: Virgin

Monty Python chronology
The Ultimate Monty Python Rip Off (1994)	The Instant Monty Python CD Collection (1994)	Monty Python's Total Rubbish (2014)

The Instant Monty Python CD Collection is a box set released in 1994 of six CDs containing eight albums by the Monty Python troupe. It does not include the first Monty Python record, Monty Python's Flying Circus, whose rights are still owned by the BBC.

It contained a small booklet of reprinted material from album sleeves and previous Python books.

== Track listing ==
For this release, each album was represented by two tracks, with each track corresponding to one side of the original vinyl pressings. For instance, the entire first half of Another Monty Python Record is the first track, while the entire second half is the second track. Due to each side of vinyl being roughly 20–30 minutes, and each CD able to hold up to 80 minutes, Monty Python's Previous Record and Monty Python's Contractual Obligation Album were split across two discs.

In addition, sketches and songs were not indexed separately. Instead, the packaging made reference to what each album contained; for example, Another Monty Python Record was listed as "including The Spanish Inquisition, Gumby Theatre, Abattoir, Ethel the Frog, Be a Great Actor, Spam Song." This set does not include "Farewell to John Denver", which was removed from some pressings of the Contractual Obligation album.

=== Disc one ===
1. Another Monty Python Record (Part 1): including The Spanish Inquisition, Gumby Theatre, Abattoir, Ethel the Frog – 25:51
2. Another Monty Python Record (Part 2): including Be a Great Actor, Spam Song – 27:55
3. Monty Python's Previous Record (Part 1): including Are You Embarrassed Easily?, There Is Nothing Quite as Wonderful as Money, Australian Wines, Argument, Fish Licence, Eric the Half-a-Bee, Travel Agent – 25:24

=== Disc two ===
1. Monty Python's Previous Record (Part 2): including Yangtse Music, Fairy Tale – 20:03
2. The Monty Python Matching Tie and Handkerchief (Part 1): including Dead Bishop, Who Cares?, Novel Writing, Bruces, Philosophers' Song, Cheese Shop – 21:20
3. The Monty Python Matching Tie and Handkerchief (Part 2): including First World War Noises, Phone-In – 19:55

=== Disc three ===
1. Monty Python Live at Drury Lane (Part 1) – 32:07
2. Monty Python Live at Drury Lane (Part 2) – 29:38

=== Disc four ===
1. The Album of the Soundtrack of the Trailer of the Film of Monty Python and the Holy Grail (Part 1) – 23:25
2. The Album of the Soundtrack of the Trailer of the Film of Monty Python and the Holy Grail (Part 2) – 23:48
3. Monty Python's Contractual Obligation Album (Part 1): including Sit on My Face, Henry Kissinger, Finland, I'm So Worried – 19:22

=== Disc five ===
1. Monty Python's Contractual Obligation Album (Part 2): including I Bet You They Won't Play This Song on the Radio, Bells, Traffic Lights, All Things Dull and Ugly – 25:34
2. Monty Python's Life of Brian (Part 1) – 25:12
3. Monty Python's Life of Brian (Part 2) – 26:47

=== Disc six ===
1. Monty Python's The Meaning of Life (Part 1) – 25:21
2. Monty Python's The Meaning of Life (Part 2) – 27:54

== Distribution information ==
- CD: (1994) Virgin Records, Ltd./Kay Gee Bee Music Ltd. CDV 2748 (UK.)
