= Breakaway (biscuit) =

Brand of chocolate-covered digestive biscuit from Nestlé

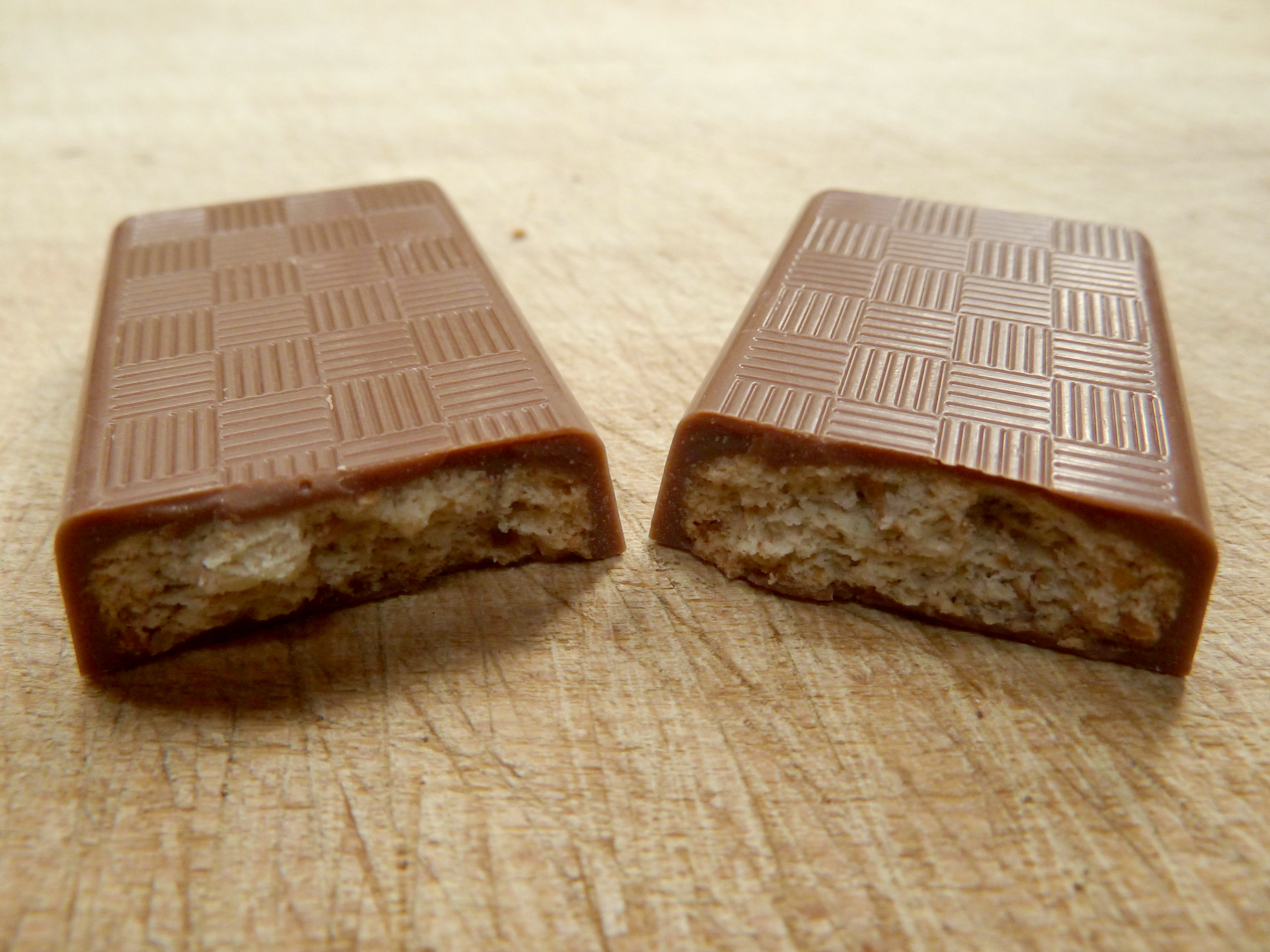
- Product type: Digestive biscuit
- Current owner: Nestlé
- Country: United Kingdom
- Introduced: 1970; 56 years ago
- Discontinued: 2024
- Previous owners: Rowntree Mackintosh Confectionery (1970–1988)
- Website: nestle.co.uk/breakaway

Breakaway was a brand of chocolate-covered digestive biscuit from Nestlé, which started production in 1970 in the United Kingdom, manufactured by Rowntree Mackintosh Confectionery. Nestlé acquired the brand in 1988. It was discontinued in February 2024 after 54 years due to falling sales.

== Ingredients ==
Nutritional info
Nutritional value per 100 g (3.5 oz)
- Energy: 2,111 kJ (505 kcal)
- Carbohydrates: 61.1 g
- Sugars: 42.4 g
- Dietary fibre: 2.4 g
- Fat: 25.5 g
- Protein: 6.3 g
- ^{†}Percentages estimated using US recommendations for adults. Source: Here

Milk chocolate (52%) (sugar, cocoa butter, cocoa mass, dried whole milk, whey powder, vegetable fat, emulsifiers (soya lecithin, E476), flavouring), wheat flour, wholemeal (10%), vegetable fat, sugar, whole oatflour, coconut, invert sugar syrup, barley malt extract, raising agents (ammonium bicarbonate, sodium bicarbonate), salt.

== Advertising ==
A mid-1970s British television commercial for the brand starred Eric Idle in a variation on his "Nudge Nudge" sketch from Monty Python's Flying Circus. Later stage performances of the original sketch included a comic reference to the commercial, as on the LP Monty Python Live at Drury Lane.

== See also ==
- List of chocolate-covered foods
- List of chocolate bar brands
