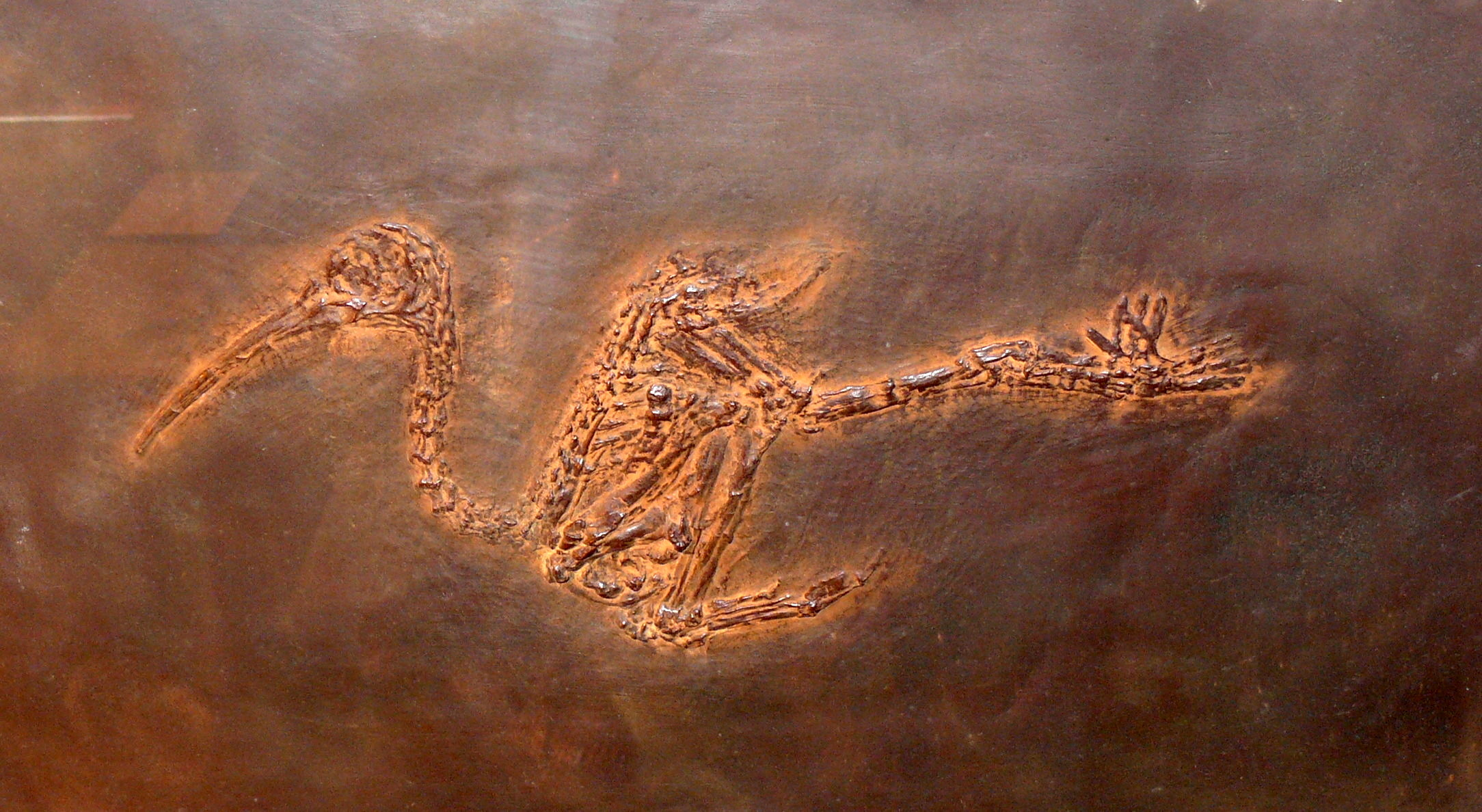
- R. messelensis from Germany

Scientific classification
- Kingdom: Animalia
- Phylum: Chordata
- Class: Aves
- Order: Pelecaniformes
- Family: Threskiornithidae
- Subfamily: †Rhynchaeitinae; Mayr, 2002
- Genus: †Rhynchaeites; Wittich, 1898

Type species
- †Rhynchaeites messelensis Wittich, 1898

Other species
- †R. litoralis Mayr & Kitchener, 2023; †R. mcfaddeni Ksepka et al., 2026

= Rhynchaeites =

Rhynchaeites Temporal range: Early to Middle Eocene

Extinct genus of birds

Rhynchaeites (Greek for "beak fossil") is an extinct genus of wading bird, a stem-group threshkiornithid, which lived in Europe and North America during the Eocene epoch. The genus contains three species, R. messelensis, R. litoralis and R. mcfaddeni. It is one of the oldest members of the ibis family known from fossil remains.

== Taxonomy ==
Hypothetical life restoration of R. messelensis

The type species, R. messelensis, is known from many well-preserved specimens from the famous Lutetian-aged Messel pit of Germany. It was initially thought to represent an early relative of painted-snipes (family Rostratulidae), and was still considered an early charadriiform for nearly a century, but was identified as an early ibis in 1983.

In 2023, a second species, R. litoralis was described from the earlier Ypresian-aged London Clay of England. R. litoralis is mostly known from isolated bones but also multiple partial skeletons. In addition to their differing morphologies, both species appear to have inhabited different habitats, with R. messelensis inhabiting freshwater habitats and R. litoralis coastal habitats.

In 2026, a largely complete, articulated Rhynchaeites specimen from the Green River Formation of the United States was described as the holotype of a third species, R. mcfaddeni. The potential leg bone fossils of Rhynchaeites have also been found in the earliest Ypresian Fur Formation in Denmark. It has been hypothesized that the supposed parrot relative Mopsitta tanta, known from a single humerus bone, is the same bird as the leg fossils and thus actually belongs in Rhynchaeites too.

== Morphology ==
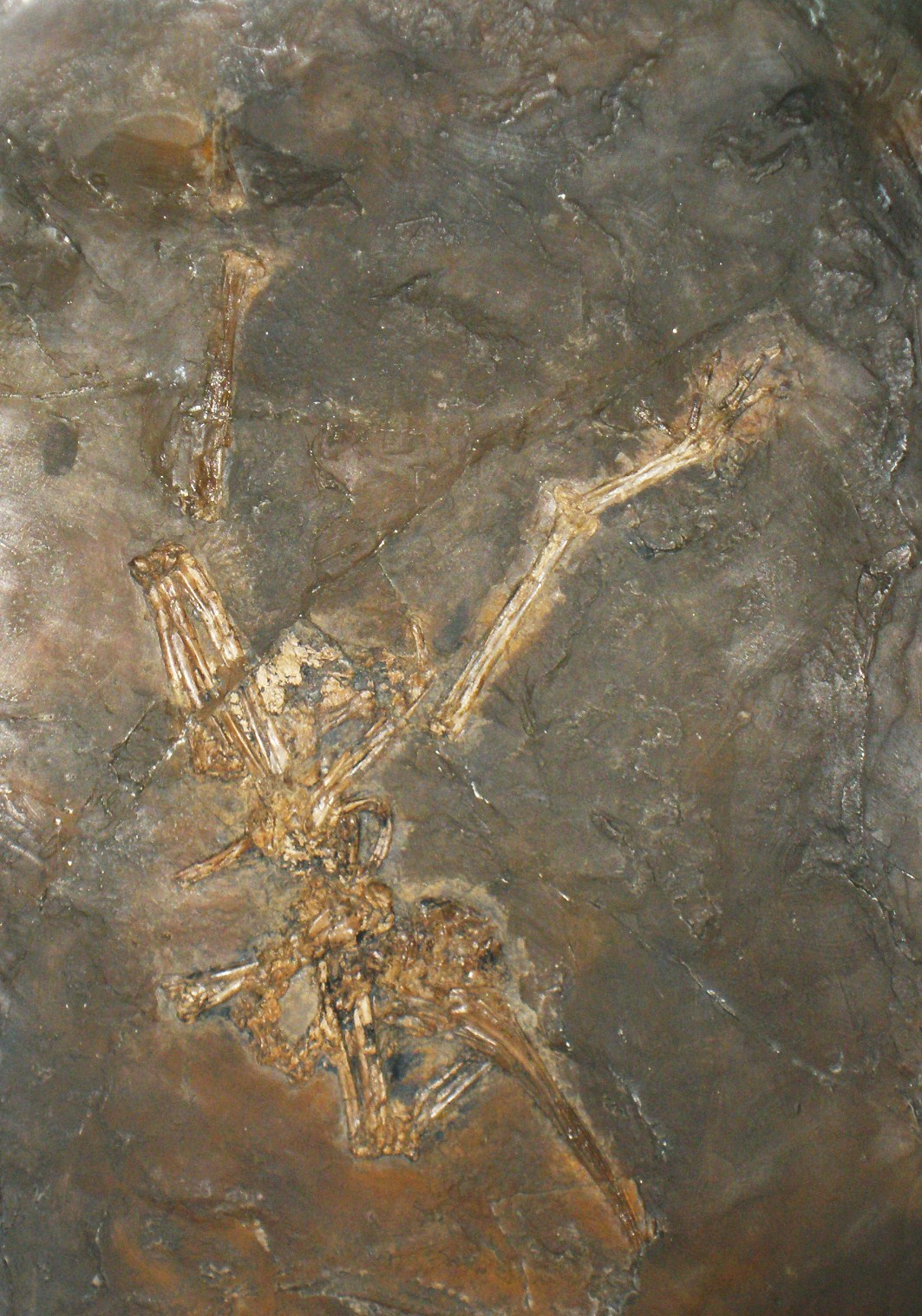
Rhynchaeites messelensis

Despite its close resemblance to modern ibises, Rhynchaeites differs in several aspects of morphology from them, primarily in its much shorter legs and the apparent lack of any sensory nerves in its bill. The latter suggests that Rhynchaeites primarily relied on sight to find food, as opposed to the tactile probing of modern ibises. The short legs of Rhynchaeites appear to be a plesiomorphic trait, and suggest that long legs evolved multiple times within the Pelecaniformes.
