= Election Night Special =

1970 Monty Python TV sketch

"Election Night Special" is a Monty Python sketch parodying the coverage of United Kingdom general elections, specifically the 1970 general election, on the BBC by including hectic actions by the media and a range of ridiculous candidates.

This sketch was featured in Episode 19 of the Monty Python's Flying Circus TV series, first broadcast on 3 November 1970. A somewhat different version of the sketch (leading into "The Lumberjack Song") was also featured on the Monty Python Live at the Theatre Royal Drury Lane album. A longer edit of the Drury Lane version also appeared on the promotional flexidisc Monty Python's Tiny Black Round Thing. The sketch also provides the basis for an item in Monty Python's Big Red Book in the form of a mock pamphlet for the Silly Party, which alongside characters from the original sketch, also names both Paul Fox and Ian MacNaughton as Silly Party candidates.

Throughout the sketch, the linkman (John Cleese) and other commentators appear in a fixed sequence, either giving variations on their original statement or simply repeating it, as results are coming in from various constituencies. The election is mainly contested by two major parties, the Sensible Party and the Silly Party, though third-party candidates (a candidate for the Slightly Silly Party and a Very Silly Independent candidate) make appearances.

== Candidates and their vote totals ==
The sketch focuses on election results from the following three constituencies:

Party	Candidate	Votes	%	Swing
Leicester
Silly Party	Jethro Q. Walrustitty	32,108	51.2%	Hold
Sensible Party	Arthur J. Smith	30,612	48.8%	Defeat
Total valid votes		62,720	100.0%	
Luton
Silly Party	Tarquin Fin-tim-lin-bin-whin-bim-lim-bus-stop-F'tang-F'tang-Olé-Biscuitbarrel	12,441	57.7%	Gain
Sensible Party	Alan Jones	9,112	42.3%	Loss
Slightly Silly Party	Kevin Phillips-Bong	0	0.0%	Pathetic Defeat
Total valid votes		21,553	100.0%	
Harpenden South East
Sensible Party	James Walker	26,318	50.0%	Gain
Silly Party	Mr Elsie Zzzzzzzzzzzzzzzip	26,317	50.0%	Loss
Very Silly (Independent)	Malcolm Peter Brian Telescope Adrian Umbrella Stand Jasper Wednesday (pops mouth twice) Stoatgobbler John Raw Vegetable (barks) Arthur Norman Michael (blows squeaker) Featherstone Smith (whistle) Northcott Edwards Harris (fires pistol, then 'whoop') Mason (chuff-chuff-chuff-chuff) Frampton Jones Fruitbat Gilbert (sings) 'We'll keep a welcome in the' (three shots) Williams If I Could Walk That Way Jenkin (squeaker) Tiger-drawers Pratt Thompson (sings) 'Raindrops Keep Falling On My Head' Darcy Carter (horn) Pussycat (sings) 'Don't Sleep In The Subway' Barton Mainwaring (hoot, 'whoop') Smith	2	0.0%	Spoiler
Total valid votes		52,637	100.0%	

At the end of the sketch, further results are given in short:

- Engelbert Humperdinck gains Barrow in Furness from Ann Haydon-Jones and her husband Pip.
- Arthur Negus has held Bristols. "That's not a result, that's a bit of gossip." (Bristols is rhyming slang for 'breasts': Bristol City = titty.)
- Mary Whitehouse taking Umbrage (in reaction to the previous "held Bristols").
- Wales isn't swinging at all, which is "no surprise".
- Monty Python holds the Credits.

The Drury Lane version gives a different set of results:

- A little pink pussycat gains Barrow in Furness, "a gain from the Liberals, there".
- Rastus Odinga-Odinga has taken Wolverhampton South West; "That's Enoch Powell's old constituency; an important gain for Darkie Power".
- Arthur Negus has held Bristols. "That's not a result, that's a bit of gossip." (see above)
- Sir Alec Douglas-Home has taken Oldham for the Stone-Dead Party.
- A small piece of putty about that big, a cheese mechanic from Dunbar, and two frogs (one called Kipper and the other one not) have all gone "neep neep neep" in Blackpool Central.

== Cultural references ==
- The character Tarquin Fin-tim-lin-bin-whin-bim-lim-bus-stop-F'tang-F'tang-Olé-Biscuitbarrel seemingly made another appearance in the third season, episode twelve, of Monty Python's Flying Circus in the "Spot the Looney" sketch, although was not identified by name.
- In the 1981 Crosby by-election, candidate John Desmond Dougrez-Lewis, a 22-year-old student from Hayes in Greater London, changed his name by deed poll to Tarquin Fin-tim-lin-bin-whin-bim-lim-bus-stop-F'tang-F'tang-Olé-Biscuitbarrel. Thus the name was printed on the ballot paper, although the Returning Officer simply referred to him as "Tarquin Biscuitbarrel". He received 223 votes and finished fifth out of nine candidates. He later participated in the Official Monster Raving Loony Party, which has some conceptual similarities with the Silly Party mentioned in the sketch.
- Jeremy Fox stood as a candidate for the Silly Party in Dover in the 1979 British general election, as a protest against the National Front. Fox outpolled the National Front candidate by 642 votes to 378.
- The original sketch includes the line, "What do you make of the nylon dog cardigan and plastic mule rest?" These items had been mentioned in The Goon Show episode, "Tales of Old Dartmoor" fourteen years prior. The linkman's question is answered by a person off-camera who yells, "There's no such thing!" and the linkman says, "Thank you Spike," apparently in acknowledgement to The Goon Show creator and star Spike Milligan.
- In Small Gods by Terry Pratchett, a god called P'tang P'tang, who resembles a giant newt, is worshipped by a small nation of marsh-dwelling nomads totalling fifty-one people. The Great God Om persuades him to help him halt a war.

== See also ==
- List of Monty Python's Flying Circus episodes
- List of recurring Monty Python's Flying Circus characters
