= Mopsitta =

Mopsitta Temporal range: Lower Eocene

Scientific classification
- Domain: Eukaryota
- Kingdom: Animalia
- Phylum: Chordata
- Class: Aves
- Genus: †Mopsitta; Waterhouse et al. 2008
- Species: †M. tanta

Binomial name
- †Mopsitta tanta Waterhouse et al. 2008

Extinct genus of birds

Mopsitta tanta is an extinct bird of uncertain taxonomic position from the Early Eocene of Denmark; its remains were recovered from the Fur Formation. So far, the holotype and only known specimen is a single humerus bone of rather large size. Although the phylogenetic position of genus is unclear, it was initially presumed to be phylogenetically closer to Recent Psittacidae than to other known Palaeogene psittaciforms and may, therefore, represent the oldest known crown-group parrot.

However, further examination subsequently pointed out that the fossil lacks clear psittaciform (let alone psittacid) apomorphies. Following the discovery that the fossil ibis genus Rhynchaeites also occurred in the Fur Formation, it was hypothesized that the M. tanta humerus actually belongs in that genus, being a better match (except in size) to the known Rhynchaeites remains than to any psittaciform fossil hitherto found.

The species has been nicknamed the "Danish Blue Parrot", or the "Norwegian Blue", in honor of the Dead Parrot sketch from Monty Python's Flying Circus.
