= Python On Song =

Single by Monty Python
- Released: 19 November 1976
- Genre: Comedy
- Label: Charisma

Monty Python singles chronology
"Lumberjack Song" (1975)	"Python On Song" (1976)	"Brian" / "Always Look On The Bright Side Of Life" (1979)

Python On Song is the name of a double pack of two 7" singles released by Monty Python on 19 November 1976. The first record was a straight reissue of the previous year's release of the "Lumberjack Song"/"Spam Song" single. The second record consisted of a live recording of "Bruces Song" taken from Live At Drury Lane, with the other side containing the group's second single "Eric The Half A Bee".

The two records were housed in a gatefold sleeve containing the lyrics for all four songs. The first 5000 copies had the Pythons' autographs printed on the cover and an adhesive seal holding the two sides of the gatefold together.

== Track listing ==
=== Record One ===
==== Side One ====
1. Lumberjack Song

==== Side Two ====
1. Spam Song

=== Record Two ===
==== Side One ====
1. Bruces Song

==== Side Two ====
1. Eric The Half A Bee
