= Monty Python Live at City Center =

Live album by Monty Python
- Released: 3 May 1976 (US)
- Recorded: April 1976 at New York City Center
- Genre: Comedy
- Length: 60:41
- Label: Arista
- Producer: Nancy Lewis

Monty Python chronology
| The Album of the Soundtrack of the Trailer of the Film of Monty Python and the Holy Grail (1975) | Monty Python Live at City Center (1976) | The Monty Python Instant Record Collection (1977) |

Monty Python Live at City Center is a US-only live album by Monty Python, recorded at the New York City Center in April 1976 and rush released by Arista Records the following month. In order to get the album out in the shops quickly, the recordings were made early on in the run, where some of the performances were affected by faulty microphones. The team were joined onstage by regular actress Carol Cleveland and musician Neil Innes, who also performed in some sketches.

The album was not released in the UK, due to its similarity to Live at Drury Lane. As with that album, Michael Palin provided new linking material.

A CD version was released in 1997.

Professional ratings
Review scores
| Source | Rating |
|---|---|
| AllMusic | 4/5 stars |

== Track listing ==
=== Side one ===
1. Introduction/The Llama
2. Gumby Flower Arranging
3. Short Blues
4. Wrestling
5. World Forum
6. Albatross/Colonel Stopping It
7. Nudge Nudge
8. Crunchy Frog
9. Bruces' Song
10. Travel Agent

=== Side two ===
1. Camp Judges
2. Blackmail
3. Protest Song
4. Pet Shop
5. Four Yorkshiremen
6. Argument Clinic
7. Death of Mary, Queen of Scots
8. Salvation Fuzz
9. Lumberjack Song

Monty Python Live at City Center was also broadcast on the King Biscuit Flower Hour radio show on 9 May 1976, with an introduction by John Cleese and Dave Herman.

== Personnel ==
- Graham Chapman
- John Cleese
- Terry Gilliam
- Eric Idle
- Terry Jones
- Michael Palin

=== Additional performers ===
- Carol Cleveland
- Neil Innes
