= Four Yorkshiremen =

Comedy sketch

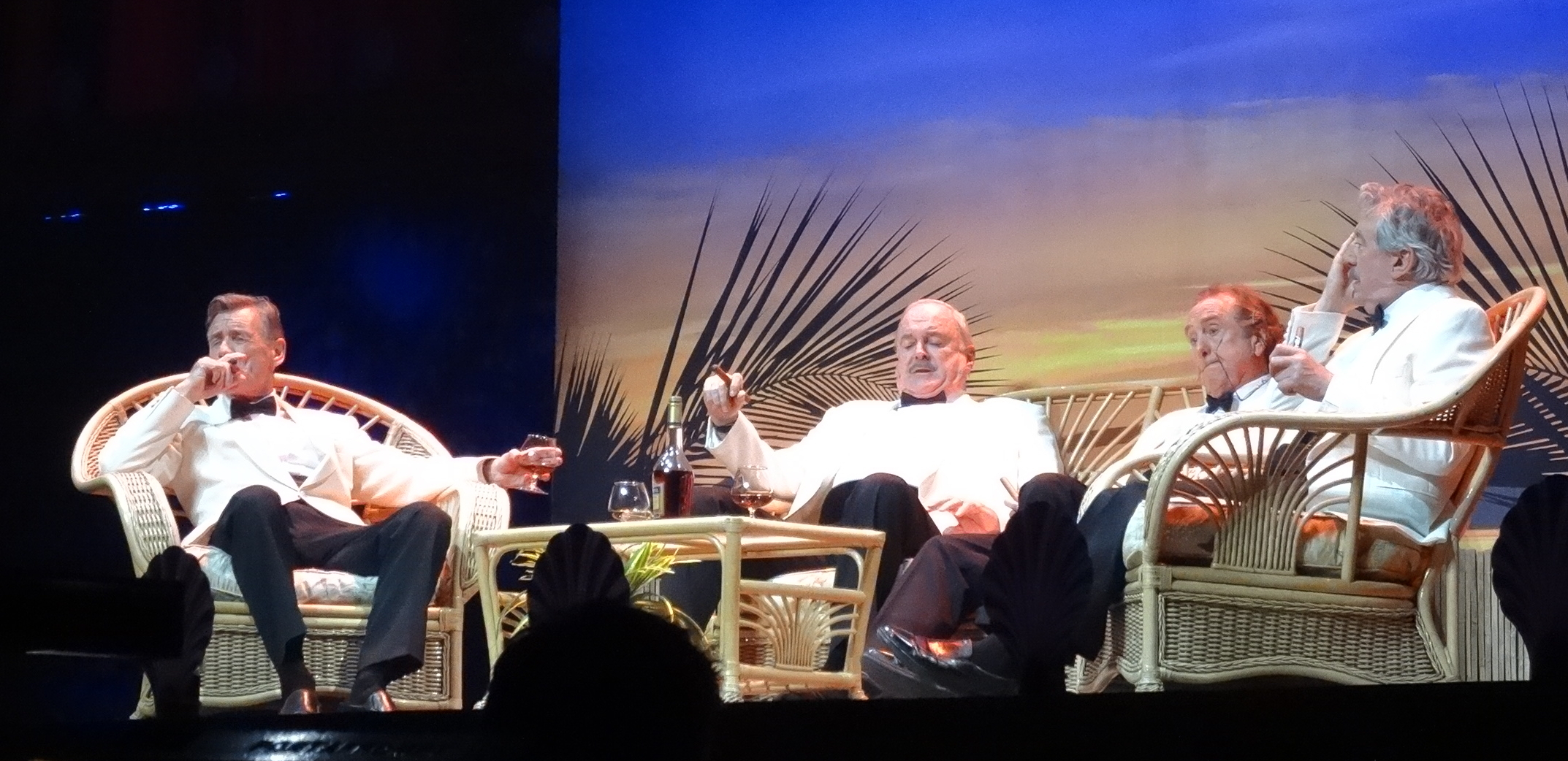
Four Yorkshiremen sketch at Monty Python Live (Mostly) in 2014

The "Four Yorkshiremen" is a comedy sketch that parodies nostalgic conversations about humble beginnings or difficult childhoods. It features four men from Yorkshire who reminisce about their upbringing. As the conversation progresses they try to outdo one another, and their accounts of deprived childhoods become increasingly absurd. For example: "We had to live in a cardboard box?" ... "A cardboard box? You were lucky! We lived for three months in a rolled-up newspaper in a septic tank."

The sketch was written by Tim Brooke-Taylor, John Cleese, Graham Chapman and Marty Feldman, and originally performed in 1967 on their TV series At Last the 1948 Show. It later became associated with the comedy group Monty Python (which included Cleese and Chapman), who performed it in their live shows, including Monty Python Live at the Hollywood Bowl.

== Performances ==
=== At Last the 1948 Show ===
The sketch was written as "Good Old Days" and performed for the 1967 British television comedy series At Last the 1948 Show by the show's four writer-performers: Brooke-Taylor, Cleese, Chapman, and Feldman. Barry Cryer is the wine waiter in the original performance and may have contributed to the writing. According to John Cleese, the sketch was inspired by "Self-Made Men," a short story by Stephen Leacock published in 1910. The original performance of the sketch by the four creators is one of the surviving sketches from the programme and can be seen on the At Last the 1948 Show DVD as the closing sketch of series 2, episode 6. Its surviving camera script names the characters as Obadiah, Ezekiel, Josiah, and Hezekiah; but only the names Obadiah and Josiah are used, at the beginning.

=== I'm Sorry, I'll Read That Again ===
A near derivative of the sketch appears in the BBC Radio show I'm Sorry, I'll Read That Again Series 7, Episode 5 on 9 February 1969, in which the cast (Cleese, Graeme Garden, Tim Brooke-Taylor, Bill Oddie and David Hatch) in the guise of old buffers at a gentlemen's club, employ the same trope of out-doing each other for hardship, this time in the context of how far and how slowly they had to walk to get to various places in former days. It ends with the same payoff line "...and if you tell that to the young people today, they won't believe you..."

=== Monty Python ===
Cleese and Chapman were later among the founding members of the comedy group Monty Python. The "Four Yorkshiremen" sketch has been performed by Python during their live shows Live at Drury Lane (1974, no video recording available), Live at the Hollywood Bowl (1982) and Monty Python Live (Mostly) (2014, performed at The O2 Arena), each performance varying slightly in its content. (Tim Brooke-Taylor and Marty Feldman receive special thanks in the closing credits of Live at the Hollywood Bowl due to the inclusion of the sketch.) The performers in each case were Chapman (replaced by Cleese in the 2014 performance), Eric Idle, Terry Jones and Michael Palin (Palin is the only member of the group actually from Yorkshire). It was also performed by Cleese, Jones, Palin and Rowan Atkinson for The Secret Policeman's Ball, the 1979 Amnesty International benefit gala.

=== Others ===
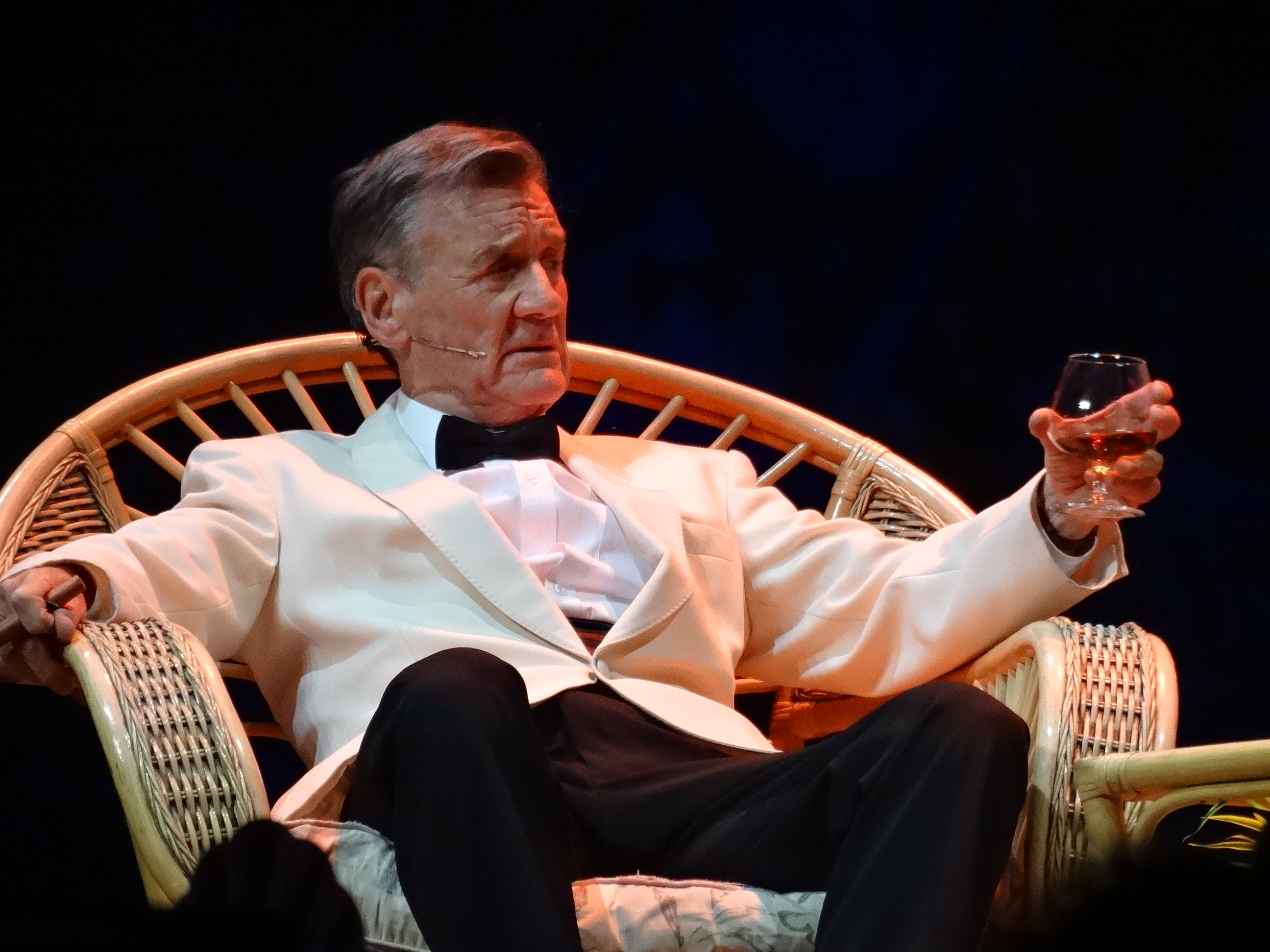
Michael Palin at Monty Python Live (Mostly).

The sketch was revived for the 2001 Amnesty show We Know Where You Live, performed by Harry Enfield, Alan Rickman, Eddie Izzard and Vic Reeves. In 1989, the script was published in the charity fundraiser The Utterly, Utterly Amusing and Pretty Damn Definitive Comic Relief Revue Book under the title "The Good Old Days", with the characters named as Joshua, Obadiah, Josiah and Ezekiel. This book was launched on an edition of the primetime chat show Wogan where the sketch was performed by Terry Wogan, Stephen Fry, Gareth Hale and Norman Pace.

In the mid-1990s, the Hungarian comedy group Holló Színház translated and performed an adapted version of the sketch, substituting "four millionaires" for the Yorkshiremen.

In March 2015 the sketch was revived and adapted in a live television performance for Red Nose Day 2015 by Davina McCall, John Bishop, David Walliams and Eddie Izzard, in which they exaggerate what they did to raise money for charities.

== See also ==
- The Aristocrats – Joke that provides a similar ad-lib framework.
- Grumpy Old Man – a similar recurring character who complains about ridiculous hardships of his youth – from Saturday Night Live.
