= Nudge Nudge =

Comedy sketch from Monty Python's Flying Circus

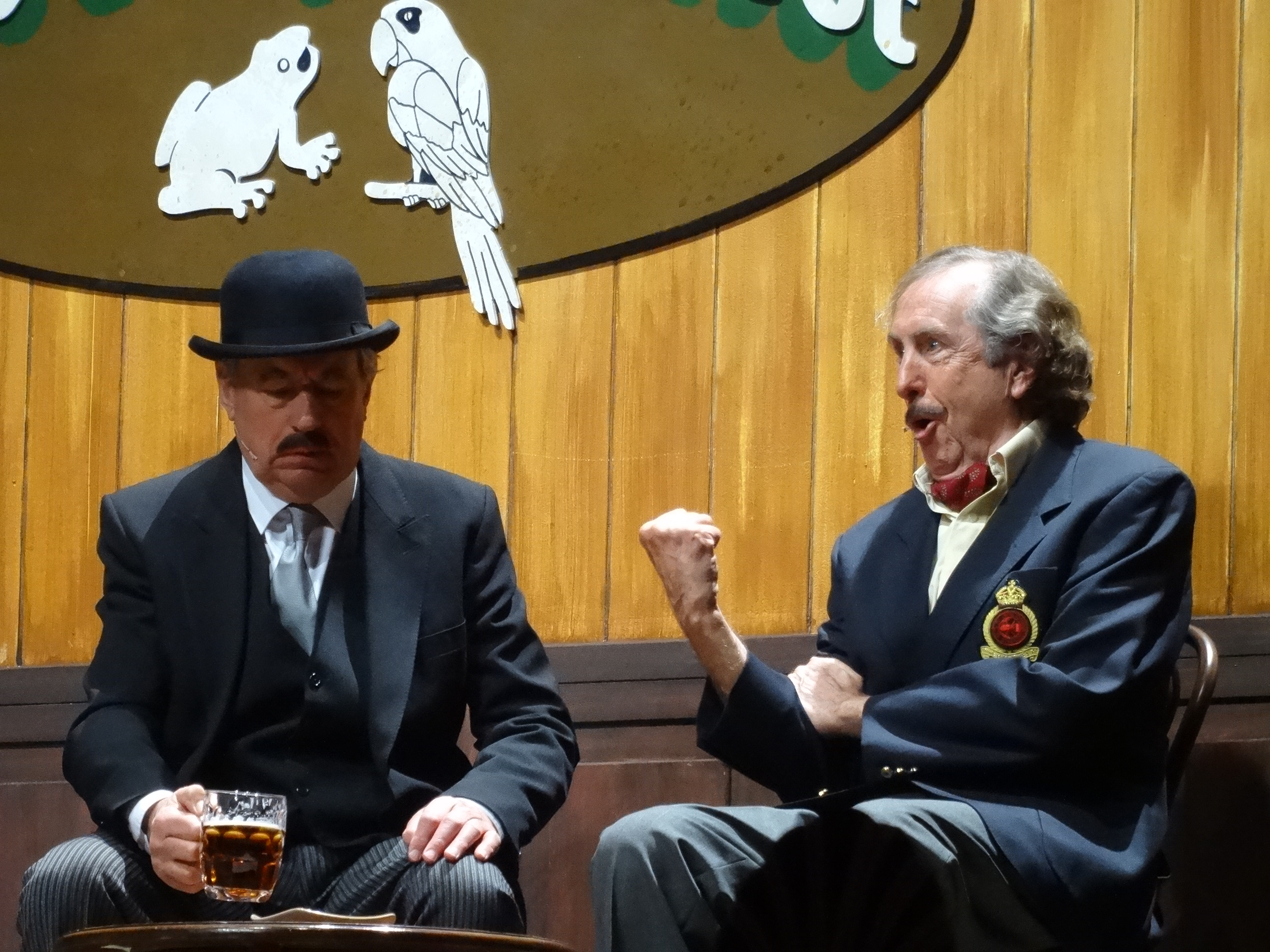
Nudge Nudge sketch at Monty Python Live (Mostly) in 2014

"Candid Photography", better known as "Nudge Nudge", is a sketch from the third Monty Python's Flying Circus episode, "How to Recognise Different Types of Trees from Quite a Long Way Away" (series 1, ep. 3) featuring Eric Idle (author of the sketch) and Terry Jones as two strangers who meet in a pub.

== Sketch description ==
Idle (who plays similar characters "Arthur Name" in "The Visitors" sketch in episode 9, and "Archbishop Nudge" in the "Crackpot Religions Ltd." sketch in episode 11 of series 2, but is given the name "Norman" in the script for this sketch) plays a stylish man who sits too close to a conservatively dressed but unassuming pub patron played by Terry Jones. Norman asks a series of cryptic questions, consisting of complex double entendres, about the other man's relationship with his wife. The unassuming man becomes irritated by the line of questioning and asks directly what he is implying. Norman wants to confirm that the man has "slept with a lady." When the man responds affirmatively, Norman asks, "What's it like?"

It is one of the few Monty Python sketches to end with a punch line.

== In other Monty Python productions ==
The sketch appears in the 1971 feature film, And Now for Something Completely Different, and the 1982 concert film, Monty Python Live at the Hollywood Bowl. It was also performed when the Pythons appeared on The Midnight Special and was recorded for the 1976 concert album Monty Python Live at City Center.

In its original airing on Monty Python's Flying Circus, the sketch was preceded by a short link in which Idle, Terry Jones and Michael Palin portray schoolboys being interviewed for television by John Cleese. During the interview, Palin and Jones say they would like to see the sketch that Idle has written.

In And Now for Something Completely Different, the sketch is followed by a scene in a gym, where Terry Gilliam—dressed as a nun on an ergometer—replies (in a dubbed female voice), "I think it's overrated." Then, the "Self-Defence Against Fresh Fruit" sketch is played in the setting.

In Monty Python Live (Mostly), the sketch segues from "Albatross". In the background, a piano version of "Never Be Rude to an Arab" is heard. Eventually the sketch segues into a new opening title song for Blackmail which incorporates samples of Idle's Nudge, Nudge dialogue.

== History ==
Originally written by Eric Idle for Ronnie Barker in another comedy show, the sketch was rejected as a script. Eric Idle openly admits the script is confusing, the joke being mostly in the delivery.

== Reception ==
The phrases, "nudge nudge" and "wink wink", are English idiomatic phrases implying sexual innuendo that pre-date the sketch.>

Idle says he learned that Elvis Presley was a fan of the sketch, and would call his friends "squire" in reference to it.

Idle reprised the sketch in TV advertisements for the Breakaway chocolate bar. A reference to this is clearly heard on Monty Python Live at Drury Lane, where Idle mentions the product. Idle and Cleese also both advertised the Cadbury Nudge chocolate bar in Australia from 1976.
