= Dead Parrot sketch =

Monty Python sketch (1969)

The "Dead Parrot sketch", alternatively and originally known as the "Pet Shop sketch" or "Parrot sketch", is a sketch from Monty Python's Flying Circus about a non-existent species of parrot, called a "Norwegian Blue". A satire on poor customer service, it was written by John Cleese and Graham Chapman and initially performed in the show's first series, in the eighth episode ("Full Frontal Nudity", which first aired 7 December 1969).

The sketch portrays a conflict between disgruntled customer Mr Praline (played by Cleese) and a shopkeeper (Michael Palin), who argue whether or not a recently purchased parrot is dead.

Over the years, Cleese and Palin have performed many versions of the "Dead Parrot" sketch for television shows, record albums, and live performances. "Dead Parrot" was voted the top alternative comedy sketch in a Radio Times poll.

The Dead Parrot sketch performed on Monty Python's Flying Circus in 1969
Listen to a clip from the sketch.

== Plot ==
Mr. Praline (Cleese) enters the pet shop to register a complaint about a recently purchased 'Norwegian Blue parrot' (parrots are not native to Norway) just as the shopkeeper (Palin) is preparing to close the establishment for lunch. Despite being told that the bird is deceased and that it had been nailed to its perch, the proprietor insists that it is "pining for the fjords" or simply "stunned".

As the exasperated Praline attempts to wake up the parrot, the shopkeeper tries to make the bird move by hitting the cage, and Praline erupts into a rage after banging "Polly Parrot" on the counter. After listing several euphemisms for death ("is no more", "has ceased to be", "bereft of life, it rests in peace", and "is an ex-parrot") he is told to go to the pet shop run by the shopkeeper's brother in Bolton, Lancashire, for a refund. He travels to Bolton only to find himself in the exact same store as before, with his cage on the floor, as the proprietor of that store (who is really the first shopkeeper, save for a false moustache) claims this is Ipswich, prompting Praline to return to the railway station, where the station attendant (Terry Jones) assures him that he is actually in Bolton after all.

Confronting the shopkeeper's "brother" for lying, the shopkeeper claims he was playing a prank on Praline by sending him to Ipswich, which he claims was a palindrome for Bolton; Praline points out that the shopkeeper was wrong because a palindrome for Bolton would have been "Notlob" (i.e., it would not be spelled the same backwards). When the shopkeeper demands to know what he wants, Praline refuses to continue this conversation, saying that "this is getting too silly". The no-nonsense Colonel (Graham Chapman) then bursts in to concur and orders the sketch to be stopped.

== Background ==
The "Dead Parrot" sketch was inspired by a "Car Salesman" sketch that Palin and Chapman had done in How to Irritate People. In it, Palin played a car salesman who repeatedly refused to admit that there was anything wrong with his customer's (Chapman's) car, even as it fell apart in front of him. That sketch was based on an actual incident between Palin and a car salesman. In Monty Python Live at Aspen, Palin said that this salesman "had an excuse for everything". John Cleese said on the same show that he and Chapman "believed that there was something very funny there, if we could find the right context for it". In early drafts of what would become the Dead Parrot Sketch, the frustrated customer was trying to return a faulty toaster to a shop. Chapman realised that it needed to be "madder", and came up with the parrot idea.

== Variations of the sketch ==
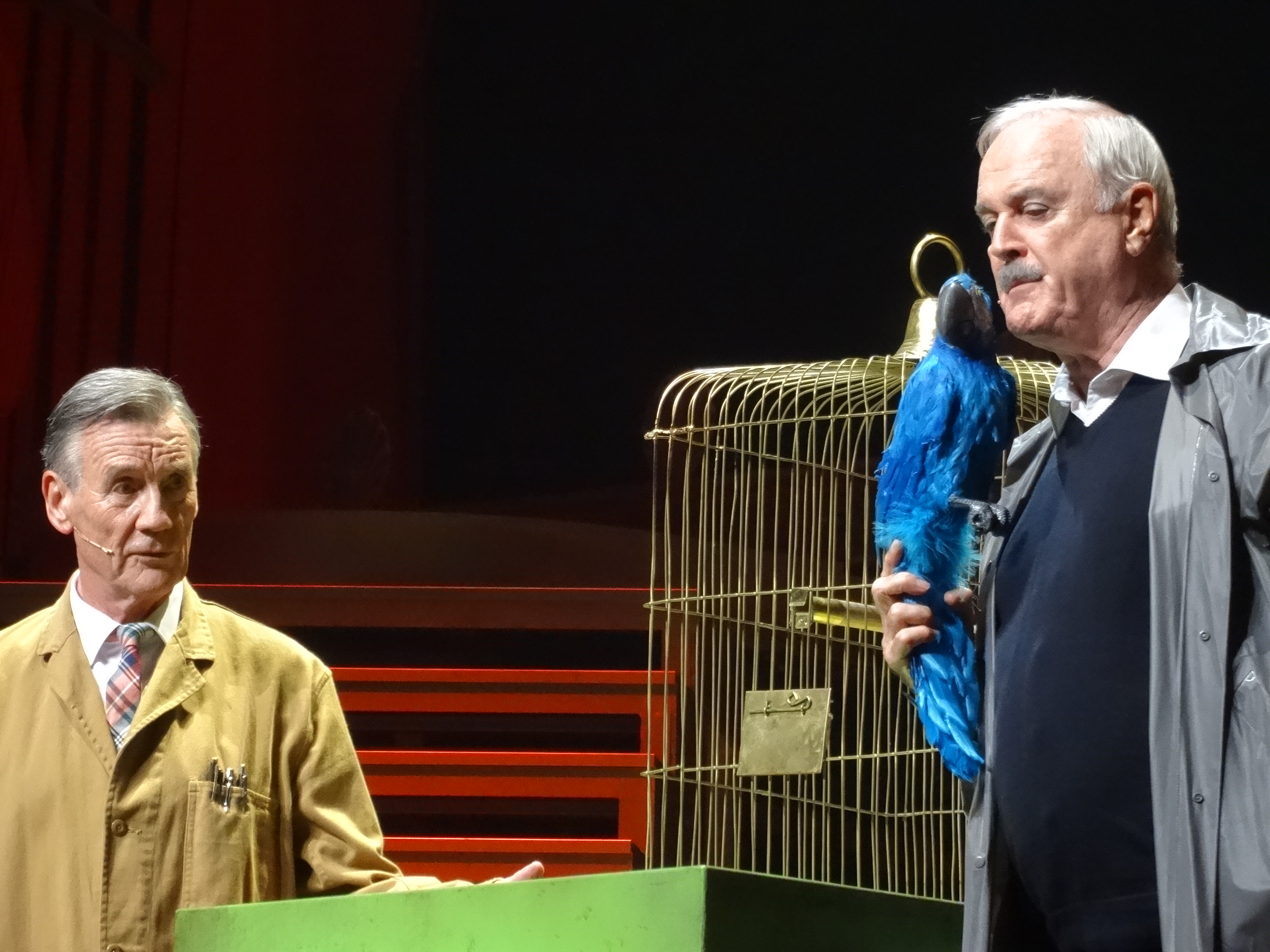
Palin and Cleese performing the Dead Parrot sketch at Monty Python Live (Mostly) in 2014

In the film And Now for Something Completely Different (1971), in which the parrot is a blue and gold macaw, the sketch ends with the shopkeeper explaining that he always wanted to be a lumberjack and, ignoring Mr Praline's protests of that being irrelevant, begins singing "The Lumberjack Song".

The Monty Python Live at Drury Lane album features a live version of the sketch, which is slightly different from the TV version. Praline's rant about the deceased parrot includes "He fucking snuffed it!" Also, the sketch ends with the shopkeeper saying that he has a slug that does talk. Cleese, after a brief pause, says, "Right, I'll have that one, then!" According to Michael Palin's published diary, Palin changed his response in order to throw Cleese off. During this performance something occurs on stage that does not translate into audio, but causes the audience to break into hysterics upon Cleese's follow-up line "Now that's what I call a dead parrot".

A live performance from the 1976 Amnesty International benefit show, A Poke in the Eye (With a Sharp Stick), has Palin bursting into laughter while Cleese declares "Pining for the fjords? What kind of talk is that?" The audience cheers this bit of breaking character, but Palin quickly composes himself and Cleese declares "Now, look! This is nothing to laugh at!" before proceeding with the sketch. This version can be seen in the film Pleasure at Her Majesty's, albeit with the ending removed.

The 1976 Monty Python Live at City Center performance ended with the following punchline:

Shopkeeper: (long, long pause) ... Do you want to come back to my place?
Mr Praline: I thought you'd never ask.

In his appearance on The Muppet Show, Cleese appears as a pirate attempting to take over a spaceship during a "Pigs in Space" sketch. At the end of the sketch, he demands of the smart-mouthed talking parrot on his shoulder, "Do you want to be an ex-parrot?"

In 1980, the sketch was performed again during The Pythons' four-night stint at the Hollywood Bowl. However, it was one of the sketches to be cut from the 1982 film version. In the 1989 TV special which saw the final appearance of all six Pythons together, the sketch was mentioned in the title, Parrot Sketch Not Included – 20 Years of Monty Python. True to its title, the "Dead Parrot sketch" is not included.

In 1989's Amnesty benefit show, The Secret Policeman's Biggest Ball, the sketch opens similarly, but ends very differently:

Mr Praline: It's dead, that's what's wrong with it.
Shopkeeper: (long pause as he examines the bird) So it is. 'Ere's your money back and a couple of holiday vouchers.
(audience goes wild)
Mr Praline: (looks completely flabbergasted) Well, you can't say Thatcher hasn't changed some things.

Margaret Thatcher famously used the sketch in a speech at the Conservative Party Conference in 1990, referring to the Liberal Democrats and their symbol being a dove, before ending the speech by commenting, "And now for something completely different." According to her former political secretary John Whittingdale, Thatcher did not understand why the joke was funny and had to be persuaded that it would work. The Conservatives' use of this sketch was derivative of an earlier Spitting Image sketch, itself derivative of the Python Dead Parrot sketch, in which the part of Mr. Praline was played by a puppet representing David Owen and the part of the shopkeeper was played by a puppet representing Roy Jenkins. Mr Praline/Owen complains that the "party" he has recently acquired from the shopkeeper (representing the Social Democratic Party (UK)) has "expired", and the shopkeeper/Jenkins claims it is not dead but "pining for Bill Rodgers" (Rodgers, Jenkins and Owen being original members of the 'Gang of Four (SDP)'.

In a 1997 Saturday Night Live performance of the sketch, Cleese added a line to the rant: "Its metabolic processes are a matter of interest only to historians!" In an interview on NPR's Fresh Air, Palin attributed an almost dead audience to his seeing guests reverently mouthing the words of the sketch, rather than laughing at it. To end the sketch, Palin reused the punchline from City Center and asked Cleese, "Do you want to come back to my place?" to which Cleese said, "I thought you'd never ask!"

In 1998, The Sun ran the front-page headline "This party is no more...it has ceased to be...this is an EX-party" for an article about a Conservative Party conference.

For the 1999 Python Night – 30 Years of Monty Python TV special, Trey Parker and Matt Stone made a South Park version of the sketch depicting Cartman angrily returning a dead Kenny to Kyle's shop. Using much of the dialogue from the original sketch, it ends with Terry Gilliam's animations playing around with Cartman before everything is crushed by the giant foot.

In a 2002 interview with Michael Parkinson, John Cleese said that when he and Palin were performing the sketch on Drury Lane, Palin made him laugh by saying, when asked if his slug could talk, "It mutters a bit" instead of "Not really." When Cleese eventually stopped laughing, he couldn't remember where they were in the sketch. He turned to the audience and asked them what the next line was, and people shouted it at him, causing him to wonder, "What is the point of this?" He also says that when he and Palin were asked to do the sketch for Saturday Night Live they sat down together to try to remember the lines, and when they got stuck they considered just going out and stopping somebody on the street to ask how it went, since everybody seemed to have it memorised.

In his published 2006 diary, Michael Palin recalls that during the filming of Monty Python's Life of Brian in Tunisia, Spike Milligan (who happened to be there on holiday) regaled the Pythons with his own version of the Dead Parrot sketch, but changed "Norwegian Blue" to "Arctic Grey".

Cleese and Palin acted out the sketch during the Python's reunion in The O2 in July 2014, Monty Python Live (Mostly). The sketch ended with the shopkeeper saying he has a selection of cheeses, transitioning into the Cheese Shop Sketch. The entire sketch ended like the City Center performance, with the shopkeeper offering Mr Praline to come back to his place, and Mr Praline replying "I thought you'd never ask." In their final performance on 20 July (which was broadcast live to many theatres across the world), whilst listing the metaphors for the parrot's death, Cleese added the line "it had expired and gone to meet Dr Chapman" after which both Cleese and Palin did a thumbs-up to the sky.

In the episode of The Late Show with Stephen Colbert from 13 November 2015, Cleese is a guest on the show. At the end of the big furry hat segment (where Stephen Colbert – and in this specific instance, Cleese – create nonsensical rules), Cleese asks, "Do you want to come back to my place?" and Colbert replies, "I thought you'd never ask."

== Further uses ==
"Graham Chapman, co-author of the 'Parrot Sketch,' is no more. He has ceased to be, bereft of life, he rests in peace, he has kicked the bucket, hopped the twig, bit the dust, snuffed it, breathed his last, and gone to meet the Great Head of Light Entertainment in the sky."

— John Cleese alludes to the sketch at Graham Chapman's memorial service.

At Graham Chapman's memorial service, John Cleese began his eulogy by reprising euphemisms from the sketch.

Part or all of the dead parrot sketch is quoted in several television programmes, among them the "Life of Python" sketch from Not the Nine O'Clock News (a parody of the Friday Night, Saturday Morning debate on Life of Brian) and "The Early Bird", an episode from the third season of Death in Paradise.

When paleontologists published a paper announcing the discovery of a fossil parrot in Denmark, lead author Dr David Waterhouse alluded to the Dead Parrot Sketch, saying, "Obviously, we are dealing with a bird that is bereft of life, but the tricky bit is establishing that it was a parrot." However, he declared that this bird could never have been pining for the fjords, explaining, "This parrot shuffled off its mortal coil around 55 million years ago, but the fjords of Norway were formed during the last ice age and are less than a million years old."

During the Monty Python Reunion at London's O2 Arena in 2014, UKTV channel Gold commissioned sculptor Iain Prendergast to create a giant fibreglass version of the mythical "Norwegian Blue". The 50-foot long (15m) bird was displayed, appropriately "resting" on its back, inside the O2 during the run of the shows there, as well as at Potters Fields Park in South London, in view of Tower Bridge.

The sketch was extensively referenced in a 2021 British Columbia court opinion allowing a class action lawsuit for dietary supplements which did not contain the advertised ingredients. The judge stated "Health Canada cannot establish a protocol that requires that a parrot only still have its feathers in order to be sold as a live parrot, and thereby prevent anyone from suing after being sold a parrot who 'joined the bleedin' choir invisible'".

== Precedents ==
The Philogelos, the oldest surviving joke book from antiquity written in the fourth century AD, contains a joke widely reported as an "ancestor" to the Dead Parrot sketch. In the joke, a man complains to a slave trader that a slave recently sold to him has died, to which the slave trader replies, "When he was with me, he never did any such thing!"

In Mark Twain's humorous short story "A Nevada Funeral", two characters use a series of euphemisms for death including "kicked the bucket" and "departed to that mysterious country from whose bourne no traveller returns".

In 1963, Benny Hill performed a sketch entitled "The Taxidermist" (written by Dave Freeman) on The Benny Hill Show in which he attempted to pass off a stuffed duck as a parrot (blaming its different appearance on "the steaming" and "the shrinkage"). John Cleese later admitted that he watched Hill's show during this period, but did not recall that particular piece.

In the 1960s, the comedian Freddie "Parrot Face" Davies included an obviously stuffed parrot in his act, berating its seller for having cheated him.

== Legacy ==
In 2008, the extinct bird genus Mopsitta was discovered in the Fur Formation and initially described as a parrot. The bird was nicknamed the "Danish Blue Parrot" and "Norwegian Blue" in reference to the Monty Python sketch due to being a dead parrot from Scandinavia.

There is a painted bronze sculpture, Monument for a Dead Parrot, close to the National Maritime Museum in Greenwich, created in 2009 by artist John Reardon. It has a purpose-built plinth and is located on the corner of Romney Road and King William Walk.
