= Monty Python's Tiny Black Round Thing =

Single by Monty Python

from the album Live At Drury Lane
- Released: 25 May 1974 (with NME)
- Recorded: 23 March 1974 (live recording) at Theatre Royal, Drury Lane & 1974 (studio recording)
- Studio: Sunrise Music, London
- Genre: Comedy
- Label: NME/Charisma
- Songwriter(s): Monty Python
- Producer(s): Andre Jacquemin; Dave Howman; Alan Bailey

Monty Python singles chronology
"Teach Yourself Heath" (1972)	"Monty Python's Tiny Black Round Thing" (1974)	"Lumberjack Song" (1975)

Monty Python's Tiny Black Round Thing was a 33 rpm flexidisc by Monty Python, released to promote the original release of Monty Python Live at Drury Lane. 400,000 copies were given away free with the British music weekly paper NME (New Musical Express) during May 1974.

The release contained two live tracks that appeared on the team's forthcoming Drury Lane LP, although "Election Night Special" is a longer edit than that would feature on the album.

Michael Palin provided new linking material, with his performance as the Head of NME sounding a very close relation to Mr Gumby.

In 2014 the record was reissued on heavyweight 45 rpm vinyl as part of Monty Python's Total Rubbish.

== Track listing ==
=== Side One ===
1. Introduction from Head of New Musical Express (0:55)
2. Election Night Special Part 1(6:38)
3. Hair Spray Ad (0:51)

=== Side Two ===
1. Reviews (0:59)
2. Election Night Special Part 2/The Lumberjack Song (5:03)
