= Always Look on the Bright Side of Life =

1979 song from Monty Python's Life of Brian

- 1991 7-inch reissue artwork

Single by Monty Python

from the album Monty Python's Life of Brian soundtrack
- A-side: "Brian"
- Released: 16 November 1979
- Recorded: 8 September 1978
- Studio: Chappell Studios Bond Street – Friar Park, Henley-On-Thames
- Genre: Comedy music
- Length: 3:23
- Label: Virgin (UK); Warner Bros. (US)
- Songwriter: Eric Idle
- Producers: Andre Jacquemin; Dave Howman

Monty Python singles chronology
| "Python On Song" (1976) | "Always Look on the Bright Side of Life" / "Brian" (1979) | "I Like Chinese" (1980) |

"Always Look on the Bright Side of Life" is a comedy song written and performed by Monty Python member Eric Idle. It was first featured in the film Monty Python's Life of Brian (1979) and has gone on to become a common singalong at public events such as football matches as well as funerals.

Written in the British music hall tradition, the song touches on stoicism and the "stiff upper lip" spirit in the face of adversity, so often associated with British people. It became immensely popular, reaching No. 3 on the UK singles chart in 1991. Idle performed the song live to a global audience at the 2012 Summer Olympics closing ceremony during the one-hour symphony of British Music segment.

== History ==
Whilst trying to come up with a way of ending the film Monty Python's Life of Brian, Eric Idle wrote an original version of the song on a Gibson J-50 guitar using only jazz chords he learnt from a course by Mickey Baker. Originally the song was sung in a more straight fashion, which the other Python members eventually agreed would be good enough for the end of the film. However, Michael Palin noted in his diary for 16 June 1978 that during a script meeting, "Eric's two songs—'Otto' and the 'Look on the Bright Side' crucifixion song—are rather coolly received before lunch." Despite being initially underwhelmed, the group warmed to Idle's efforts and the song was retained. While practising during a break in filming, Idle found that it worked better if sung in a more cheeky manner by a character of his called "Mr Cheeky", which in turn was based on the film's Cockney lighting crew. This new version was used in the film and became one of Monty Python's most famous compositions.

The song appears at the end of the film. The film's lead character Brian Cohen (played by Graham Chapman) has been crucified for his part in a kidnap plot. After a succession of apparent rescue opportunities all come to nothing, a character on a nearby cross (played by Eric Idle) attempts to cheer him up by singing "Always Look on the Bright Side of Life". As the song progresses, many of the other crucifixion victims (140 in all, according to the script, though twenty-three crosses are actually seen on screen) begin to dance in a very restricted way and join in with the song's whistled hook. The song continues as the scene changes to a long-shot of the crosses and the credits begin to roll. An instrumental version plays over the second half of the credits. Its appearance at the end of the film, when the central character seems certain to die, is deliberately ironic.

"Always Look on the Bright Side of Life" was arranged and conducted by John Altman and recorded at Chappell's Studio with a full orchestra and the Fred Tomlinson Singers. The whistling was performed by Neil Innes. The song appeared on the film soundtrack album, listed as "Look on the Bright Side of Life (All Things Dull and Ugly)". The subtitle does not appear in the actual song, and is only used on the soundtrack album. "All Things Dull and Ugly" was also the title of an unrelated track on Monty Python's Contractual Obligation Album (released the following year) which is a parody of the popular hymn "All Things Bright and Beautiful". The song was also released as a Double A side single with "Brian", the film's opening theme (performed by Sonia Jones).

The song touched a chord with the British trait of stoicism and the "stiff upper lip" in the face of disaster, and became immensely popular. When the destroyer HMS Sheffield was struck by an Exocet anti-ship missile on 4 May 1982 in the Falklands War, her crew sang it while waiting to be rescued from their sinking ship, as did the crew of HMS Coventry.

When Chapman died on 4 October 1989, the five remaining Pythons, as well as Chapman's close friends and family, came together at his public memorial service to sing "Always Look on the Bright Side of Life" as part of Idle's eulogy. In 2005, a survey by Music Choice showed that it was the third-most popular song Britons would like played at their funerals. By 2014, it was the most popular.

== Alternative lyrics ==
When performing the song live in a (solo) sketch within special events, Idle re-wrote one verse of the song to fit the particular occasion, and on one occasion sang a parody of the song with entirely different lyrics. What follows are two such examples of the former, and the latter.

=== We Are Most Amused version (Prince Charles's 60th birthday party, 2008) ===
"If Spamalot is hot
And you like it, or per'aps not
A bunch of knights in search of Holy Grails;
When you're 60 years of age
And your mum won't leave the stage,
It's good to know that you're still Prince of Wales!"

=== 2012 Summer Olympics closing ceremony version ===
"When you're stuck on the world's stage
With lots of loonies half your age,
And everything is starting to go wrong,
It’s too late to run away,
You might as well just stay,
Especially when they play your silly song!"

=== Duet with James Corden ===
In 2018, Idle made a guest appearance on The Late Late Show with James Corden; he and Corden begin to perform a duet of the song to distract from the abundance of bad-natured current events, but after they are interrupted multiple times by notifications on their cell phones where they are aghast at even more upsetting news, they instead sing a parody of the song titled "We Are Probably All Going to Die", which ends with a reprise of the original song's chorus.

== Single ==
"Always Look on the Bright Side of Life" was first issued as a single as a double A-side with "Brian" in the UK on 16 November 1979 to promote Monty Python's Life of Brian and its soundtrack album, but did not chart. Nine years later when the film was released on VHS, the song was reissued on 21 November 1988 in an edited form to remove profanity, with a full version of "Brian" on the B-side. Once again it failed to chart.

The song became particularly popular in the early 1990s. The film had retained a cult status in the intervening years. Around 1990, BBC Radio 1 DJ Simon Mayo, whose breakfast show had a track record of reviving old novelty songs, began playing the original version on his show, which led to Virgin reissuing the track as a single on 23 September 1991.

The 7-inch single was backed with two tracks from Contractual Obligation, "I Bet You They Won't Play This Song on the Radio" and "I'm So Worried", while the cassette and CD singles added a German-language version of "The Lumberjack Song" taken from the first Fliegender Zirkus episode. The single reached the top ten in October and prompted a deliberately chaotic performance by Idle on Top of the Pops. Despite some predictions, it did not manage to bring an end to Bryan Adams's unprecedented run at the top of the UK Singles Chart with "(Everything I Do) I Do It for You", instead peaking at number 3 and leading to a re-promotion for the 1989 compilation Monty Python Sings, which the song opens. However, the single did get to Number 1 in Ireland on 13 October 1991, despite Life of Brian having been banned in Ireland, and the soundtrack on Warners withdrawn when released after protests. Following this attention, the song became more popular than ever. Two cover versions, by Tenor Fly (incorporating the piano riff from Nina Simone's "My Baby Just Cares for Me"), and the cast of Coronation Street (with main vocals by Bill Waddington, who played Percy Sugden in the show), both reached the charts in 1995, with The Coronation Street Single version reaching number 35.

Eric Idle recorded alternative lyrics for the radio version, with the swearing censored, and the comments about the end of the film replaced with references to the end of the record, and continued rants about old people. This version was released on CD, cassette and vinyl via the compilation album Now 20 in November 1991 and as a b-side on a reissue of "Galaxy Song" (where it is billed as "1991 version") on 2 December 1991. For this radio version, the line "Life's a piece of shit" was altered to "Life's a piece of spit". In recognition of Simon Mayo's contribution to making the record a hit, a special version was also created, in which Idle addresses him by name. Mayo still uses this version when the song is played on his show. This version is also included as the penultimate track on Now That's What I Call Music! 1991 – The Millennium Series, released in 1999.

On 14 July 2014 another version of the song was issued, this time as a 12-inch single where it was promoted as "The Unofficial England Football Anthem". The track featured a new vocal from Eric Idle and some alternate lyrics about the World Cup.

=== Track listings ===
1979 7-inch

1. "Brian"/"Always Look on the Bright Side of Life" (Double A side)

1988 7-inch

1. "Always Look on the Bright Side of Life" (Edited Version)/"Brian"

1991 7-inch

1. "Always Look on the Bright Side of Life"/"I'm So Worried";"I Bet You They Won't Play This Song on the Radio"

2014 12-inch

1. "Always Look on the Bright Side of Life" (2014 Version)/"An Apology From Bernard"

== Covers ==
Harry Nilsson performed "Always Look on the Bright Side of Life" as the closing track on his 1980 album, Flash Harry. In 1997, the song was recorded by Art Garfunkel and included in the soundtrack of James L. Brooks' film As Good as It Gets. In the film itself, Jack Nicholson sings the song fleetingly with the minor addition of "your" in "brighter side of [your] life". Garfunkel's version replaced the risqué phrase "Life's a piece of shit" with the more family-friendly "Life's a counterfeit" ("Life is hit or miss" has also replaced the lyric as with wedding bands and live radio). The song has also been performed by Bruce Cockburn and released on his 1990 live CD.

The Brobdingnagian Bards recorded the song for their CD A Faire to Remember. American musician Emilie Autumn performed a harpsichord cover of the song for her compilation album A Bit o' This & That. Heavens Gate recorded a metal cover of "Always Look on the Bright Side of Life" for the album Hell for Sale!. Green Day has used it in their rendition of "Shout" during live performances, with one preserved example on their concert DVD Bullet in a Bible.

German fun metal band JBO made a version of the song with changed lyrics ("Always Look on the Dark Side of Life") for their album Sex Sex Sex. German fun punk band Heiter bis Wolkig also made a version with changed lyrics called "Versuch's mal von der breiten Seite zu seh'n". The British duo Amateur Transplants made a parody version of "Always Look on the Bright Side of Life" as well, with lyrics in which only the name and the chorus of the original song are retained.

Scooter used a shortened version, also titled "Always Look on the Bright Side of Life", on their Scooter Forever album (2017), giving the song a techno version.

== Other appearances ==
The song appears twice in the Broadway musical Spamalot, based on Monty Python and the Holy Grail – once in Act II and again during the curtain call.

The song is used at the end of Not the Messiah (He's a Very Naughty Boy), the comedic oratorio adaptation of Life of Brian written by Eric Idle and collaborator John Du Prez.

The metal band Iron Maiden are known to play the song at the end of their concerts.

The song would make an appearance on season 8 of The Masked Singer, where Idle sung it as his encore song after being unmasked as the Hedgehog.

== Charts ==
=== Weekly charts ===
| Chart (1980–1981) | Peak position |
|---|---|
| Australia (Kent Music Report) | 9 |
| Belgium (Ultratop 50 Flanders) | 30 |
| Netherlands (Dutch Top 40) | 32 |
| Netherlands (Single Top 100) | 34 |

| Chart (1991–1992) | Peak position |
|---|---|
| Australia (ARIA) | 119 |
| Austria (Ö3 Austria Top 40) | 2 |
| Belgium (Ultratop 50 Flanders) | 35 |
| Europe (Eurochart Hot 100) | 6 |
| Germany (GfK) | 3 |
| Ireland (IRMA) | 1 |
| Luxembourg (Radio Luxembourg) | 3 |
| Norway (VG-lista) | 5 |
| Switzerland (Schweizer Hitparade) | 3 |
| UK Singles (Official Charts) | 3 |
| UK Airplay (Music Week) | 34 |

=== Year-end charts ===
| Chart (1980) | Position |
|---|---|
| Australia (Kent Music Report) | 86 |

| Chart (1991) | Position |
|---|---|
| UK Singles (OCC) | 44 |

| Chart (1992) | Position |
|---|---|
| Germany (Media Control) | 27 |

== Certifications ==
| Region | Certification | Certified units/sales |
|---|---|---|
| United Kingdom (BPI) | Silver | 200,000^{‡} |
^{‡} Sales+streaming figures based on certification alone.
