= Galaxy Song =

Monty Python song by Eric Idle and John Du Prez

Single by Monty Python

from the album Monty Python's The Meaning of Life
- B-side: "Every Sperm Is Sacred"
- Released: 27 June 1983; 2 December 1991 (reissue)
- Genre: Comedy; soundtrack
- Label: CBS / MCA
- Songwriters: Eric Idle John Du Prez
- Producer: Andre Jacquemin

Monty Python singles chronology
"I Like Chinese" (1980)	"Galaxy Song" (1983)

Music video
- "Galaxy Song" on YouTube

"Galaxy Song" is a Monty Python song written by Eric Idle and John Du Prez.

The song first appeared in the 1983 film Monty Python's The Meaning of Life and was later released on the album Monty Python Sings. The song was released as a single in the UK on 27 June 1983 when it reached No. 77 in the charts and again on 2 December 1991 as a follow-up to the successful reissue of Always Look on the Bright Side of Life. In 2014 the song was featured in the live stage show Monty Python Live (Mostly) which was followed by another single release on 13 April 2015, this time in collaboration with Stephen Hawking.

== Premise and synopsis ==
The song originally debuted during the comedy sketch "Live Organ Transplants". The paramedic (John Cleese), upon failing to persuade Mrs. Brown (Terry Jones) to donate her liver, opens the refrigerator doors to reveal a man wearing a pink morning suit (Eric Idle). The man accompanies Mrs. Brown through outer space singing various statistics about the galaxy. The upshot of the song (which follows a synthesized instrumental montage that, in the movie, is accompanied by a computer-animated picture of a woman being impregnated and giving birth to the universe) is that in the grand scheme of the universe, the likelihood of Mrs. Brown's existence was almost zero, but that she should "pray that there's intelligent life somewhere up in space, 'cause there's bugger all down here on Earth". The singer returns to the refrigerator, at which point Mrs. Brown admits that the singer convinced her to hand over her liver.

== Accuracy of astronomical figures ==
The lyrics include a number of astronomical quantities, most of which are accurate to within one or two significant figures. A few statements are only approximately correct or take liberties with definitions, likely to fit within the meter of the song.

- Idle sings that Earth is "revolving at nine hundred miles an hour". The current estimate for the rotational speed at the equator is approximately 1674.4 km/h, appr. 904 nautical miles/hr or appr. 1040 statute miles/hr. which for nautical miles is accurate to two significant figures.
- Idle gives Earth's orbital speed as 19 miles (31 km) per second, which is accurate to two significant figures.
- Idle states that the Sun is "the source of all our power". In fact, there are three notable sources of electrical power which are not directly traceable to the Sun: 1) geothermal power, which is produced from geothermal energy, 2) Tidal Power, which uses tides resulting from the gravitational pull of the Moon on the Earth, and 3) nuclear power, which utilizes the radioactive decay of fissile elements. Ultimately, the vast majority of human-generated power is derived from the remains of photosynthetic plants extracted from Earth's crust...the fossil fuels. Mr. Idle's ironic commentary is a truth. The other three power sources are available because of the Sun's influence on the early Solar System.
- Idle's figures for the size of the Milky Way galaxy are roughly correct. He understates the speed at which the Sun orbits the "galactic central point" by an order of magnitude – the actual approximate average speed is 12,336,000 miles a day or 514,000 m.p.h., as opposed to the speeds of "1 million miles a day" and "40,000 miles an hour" mentioned in the song (the latter was rendered in later performances as "400,000 miles an hour"). He gives an estimate accurate to one significant figure for the total time per orbit. This is "two hundred million years" according to the song, compared with accepted figures of 220 to 250 million years.
- The song says that we are "thirty thousand light years from galactic central point", again correct to within one significant figure of 25,000 light years from the centre of the Milky Way. The song also states that the galaxy is "a hundred thousand light years side to side". This would make the galactic radius 50,000 light years, which is accurate. Australian astrophysicist Bryan Gaensler has stated that Idle's estimation of the thickness of the centre of the Milky Way, at 16,000 light years, is more accurate than the official 'textbook' figure of 6,000 light years. However, the song's position on this was later confused by Idle's performance of the song in his Not the Messiah show (2007) where the figure he sings is only 6,000 light years. The reason for the confusion has since been explained in a message from Idle on the official Monty Python website. "There was some smug website pulling apart all my original figures for the song (written circa 1981) so for the 2003 Tour (or maybe 2000) I 'updated' them. Now you tell me I was right all along! Not sure where I got my figures originally but tell the bastards to make up their minds."
- The last verse of the song explains that the universe is expanding, and furthermore, that the speed of light is the "fastest speed there is". Idle's estimate of the speed of light is a relatively accurate one: 12 million miles per minute, versus the standard figure of about 11.16 million miles per minute. Contrary to what the verse implies, the expansion of the universe is not related to the speed of light, and it is in fact expanding much faster.

== Remake ==
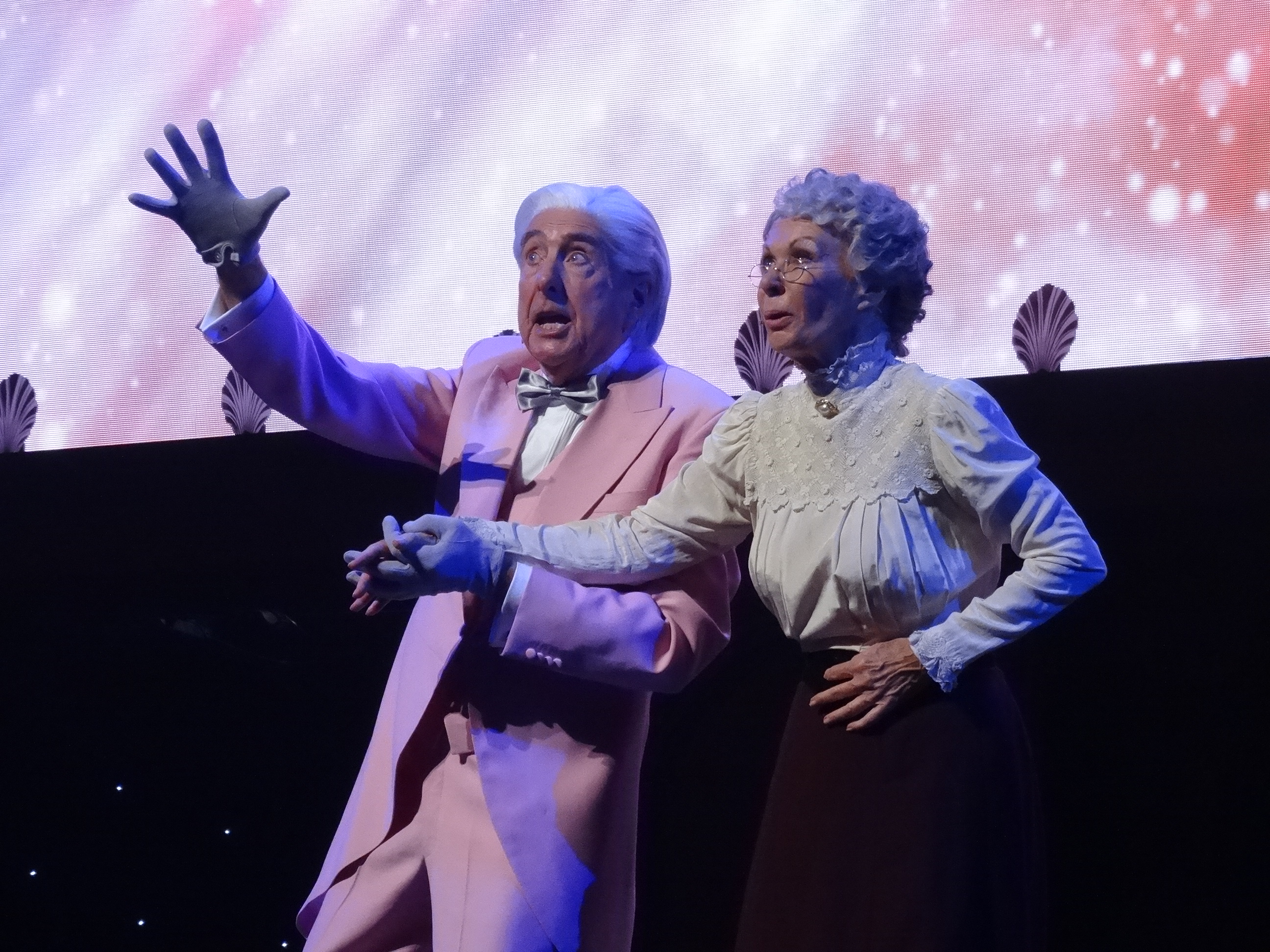
Eric Idle and Carol Cleveland performing the "Galaxy Song" at Monty Python Live (Mostly), in July 2014

Released in 1984, Jim Post's album Crooner From Outer Space features a remake called "Galaxy/Lighten Up".

"Galaxy Song" was performed by Sharon, Lois & Bram on The Elephant Show and appeared on their album Stay Tuned. (The final line was changed to "Because we need some here on Earth".)

In 1999, Clint Black recorded a remake of "The Galaxy Song" on his album D'lectrified, as well as the "Outside Intro (To Galaxy Song)", which he co-wrote and sang with Idle.

In late 2012, an updated version of "The Galaxy Song" aired on BBC Two in a trailer for Wonders of Life, hosted by physicist Brian Cox. It was called "The Galaxy DNA Song" by Idle.

In 2014, the song was performed in the stage show Monty Python Live (Mostly). Idle emerges from a refrigerator and begins singing to an elderly woman (Carol Cleveland). At one point, they start dancing on stage as a clip shows them dancing among the stars with the galaxy in the background. After the song ends, the show cuts to a clip of Cox at Cambridge discussing the various scientific inaccuracies within the song only to be knocked over by Stephen Hawking with his motorized wheelchair. Hawking tells Cox not to be so pedantic, then starts to sing the song himself. Hawking's cover for the song was released as a Record Store Day single in 2015.

In December 2016, the theme of the song was extended into the hour-long BBC Two The Entire Universe show. Written and co-presented by Idle and Professor Brian Cox, it took the form of a lecture by Cox interspersed with a "comedy and musical extravaganza with the help of Warwick Davis, Noel Fielding, Hannah Waddingham and Robin Ince, alongside a chorus of singers and dancers". The show closed with an ensemble rendition of "The Galaxy Song" with updated figures: the galaxy containing 500 billion stars instead of 100 billion; the galaxy rotation speed of 500,000 m.p.h. instead of 40,000; the central galactic thickness as 6,000 light years instead of 16,000, and an “out by us” galactic thickness of 1,000 light years instead of 3,000.

In December 2019, Sabine Hossenfelder (physicist and quantum gravity researcher) covered the song for a YouTube video – retaining many elements of the original Monty Python set in cartoon form.

== Parodies and other uses ==
- Between 1988 and 1991, furniture retailer Courts ran a series of advertisements in the United Kingdom which featured a jingle using the tune of the Galaxy Song sung by a man mimicking Idle's vocal style.
- The "Yakko's Universe" song from the animated show Animaniacs is a homage to the Python's song.
- The "Meaning of Life Space Song" from the animated show the Amazing World of Gumball has many direct references to the Python's song.
