= Monty Python's The Meaning of Life (album) =

Soundtrack album by Monty Python
- Released: 5 April 1983 (US); 20 June 1983 (UK)
- Recorded: 1982 (soundtrack) & 1983 (studio material) at Redwood Recording Studios, London
- Genre: Comedy; soundtrack
- Length: 53:17
- Label: MCA (US) CBS (UK)
- Producer: André Jacquemin; Michael Palin

Monty Python chronology
| Monty Python's Contractual Obligation Album (1980) | Monty Python's The Meaning of Life (1983) | The Final Rip Off (1987) |

Professional ratings
Review scores
| Source | Rating |
|---|---|
| AllMusic | 3.5/5 stars |

Monty Python's The Meaning of Life is the third and final soundtrack album by Monty Python, released in 1983 alongside their last film. Billed as "The only soundtrack album to be introduced by live fish! (apart from some copies of 'Shane')", it consists of sketches and songs from the film, with a few links performed by Michael Palin and a brief appearance from Terry Gilliam.

The album features dialogue which didn't make it into the final cut of the film as well as additional sound effects to help with the audio medium. "The Adventures of Martin Luther" sequence is introduced but does not appear. The sketch itself was excised from the final cut of the film but was eventually reinstated 20 years later for the DVD "Director's Cut", although it did feature in the illustrated script book which accompanied the film's release. The film's songs are included in full, with "Christmas In Heaven" having a longer fade-out than appears in the film.

The original UK vinyl release had the traditional George Peckham messages etched on the runout grooves. The first side read: "GADZOOKS!!! NO TIME LEFT. TURN OVER FOR "THE MEANING OF LIFE" NOW. ALL WILL BE REVEALED", with the second reading "NO FISH ADDITIVES USED WHATSOEVER, SEE COVER FOR FURTHER DETAILS OF PHILOSOPHY LPS". The back cover did indeed contain a short list of spoof philosophy LPs, alongside a similarly comic profile of the Python team members.

In the UK the album was accompanied by a 7" single (A 3495) on 27 June 1983 comprising Galaxy Song/Every Sperm Is Sacred, the latter song containing an extra instrumental section not featured in the film or album version. This was also available as a fish bowl-shaped picture disc.

The 2006 Special Edition includes bonus tracks which included demos, unused song ideas and radio promos.

== Track listing ==
=== Side one ===
1. Introduction
2. Fish Introduction
3. The Meaning of Life
4. The Miracle of Birth
5. Link (Frying Eggs)
6. The Third World (Yorkshire)
7. Every Sperm Is Sacred
8. Protestant Couple
9. Link (Martin Luther)
10. Growth and Learning
11. Fighting Each Other
12. Link (The Great Tea of 1914–18)
13. Fish Link

=== Side two ===
1. Terry Gilliam Intro
2. Accountancy Shanty
3. Zulu Wars
4. Middle Age
5. Live Organ Transplants
6. Galaxy Song
7. Penis Song (Not the Noël Coward Song)
8. The Autumn Years
9. Death
10. Christmas in Heaven
11. Dedication to Fish

=== Bonus tracks on 2006 reissue ===
1. Intro Title Song Demo Meaning of Life (Piano Version)
2. Alternate Intro Title Song Meaning of Life (Band Version)
3. Fat Song (Deleted Intro to Mr Creosote Sketch)
4. Alternate Christmas In Heaven Song
5. Radio Ad - Philosophers Corner
6. Radio Ad - Officer
7. Radio Ad - German Translation
8. Greasy Hair
9. Dino Viccotti
10. Stretch The Script
11. Grand Prix
12. Hard Of Thinking

== Charts ==
| Chart (1983) | Peak position |
|---|---|
| Australia (Kent Music Report) | 46 |

== Critical reception ==
Al Campbell of AllMusic gave the album three and a half out of five stars and wrote that "Unlike most comedy releases, the soundtrack of Monty Python's The Meaning of Life is an appealing audio souvenir that doesn't get stale after listening to it a few times." noting that "[this is] because of the incredibly catchy and satirical songs from the film, which are all included".

== Accolades ==
=== Grammy Awards ===
| Year | Award | Result |
| 1984 | Best Comedy Recording | Nominated |
