= I Like Chinese =

Single by Monty Python

from the album Monty Python's Contractual Obligation Album
- B-side: "I Bet You They Won't Play This Song on the Radio"; "Finland"
- Released: 3 October 1980
- Genre: Comedy
- Label: Charisma
- Songwriter: Eric Idle
- Producers: Eric Idle; Andre Jacquemin

Monty Python singles chronology
| "Brian/Always Look on the Bright Side of Life" (1979) | "I Like Chinese" (1980) | "Galaxy Song" (1983) |

"I Like Chinese" is a comedic song written and performed by Eric Idle and arranged by John Du Prez. It appears on Monty Python's Contractual Obligation Album from 1980, and was issued as a 7" single in the UK on 3 October 1980. It was later included on the CD Monty Python Sings.

The song has four verses; the first discussing how the world has become a terrible place (due in part to nuclear bombs that can "blow us all sky high"). The song then segues into a jaunty melody in which the singer states that he "likes Chinese". Broadly outlining stereotypes about Chinese people (an example of this is the stereotype that Chinese people are short, in the line "They only come up to your knees"), it also outlines the achievements of China and its people, including Chinese food, maoism, taoism, I Ching, chess (which is actually from ancient India), penjing ("I like their tiny little trees"), Zen, ping pong, yin and yang, and Confucius. Near the end of the song, an erhu starts playing to add more Chinese atmosphere. A high-pitched voice created by sped-up playback and meant to represent a Chinese stereotype joins the chorus as well.

The song is sung in English, and the fourth verse contains lyrics in Mandarin.

The version appearing on the Monty Python Live (Mostly) stage show includes an accompaniment of dancers in Chinese costumes, and has additional lyrics, for example referring to the Chinese as "still a little communese".

In Australia, the tune with modified lyrics is used in television advertisements by electrical retailer Bing Lee (as "I like Bing Lee").
