= Monty Python's Life of Brian (album) =

Soundtrack album by Monty Python
- Released: 8 October 1979 (US); 9 November 1979 (UK)
- Recorded: 1978–1979 (soundtrack) & August 1979 (studio material)
- Studio: Redwood Recording Studios, London
- Genre: Comedy; soundtrack
- Length: 51:51
- Label: Warner Bros. Records
- Producer: Eric Idle; Graham Chapman; Andre Jacquemin; Dave Howman

Monty Python chronology
The Monty Python Instant Record Collection (1977)	Monty Python's Life of Brian (1979)	Monty Python's Contractual Obligation Album (1980)

Professional ratings
Review scores
Source	Rating
Allmusic	4/5 stars

Monty Python's Life of Brian is the second soundtrack album by Monty Python, released in 1979 alongside the film of the same name. It contains scenes from the film interrupted by linking sections performed by Eric Idle and Graham Chapman, who also acted as producers following an aborted attempt at a soundtrack album by Michael Palin. The album opens with a brief rendition of "Hava Nagila" on Scottish bagpipes, which had earlier been considered for use in a scene later cut from the film.

A 7" single (K17495) Double A-side of "Brian"/"Always Look on the Bright Side of Life" was released in the UK on 16 November 1979 to promote the album.

In 2006 a special edition CD added six bonus tracks comprising outtakes, demos and publicity material to the end of the album.

Part of the studio linking material was later used in the 2012 animated film A Liar's Autobiography: The Untrue Story of Monty Python's Graham Chapman.

A limited edition picture disc of the album was released on 13 April 2019, as part of Record Store Day.

== Controversy ==
In common with the controversy surrounding the film, the album was banned in Ireland after Father Brian D'Arcy highlighted how it had worked its way through a loophole in the country's censorship laws, claiming "Anybody who buys the record and finds it funny must have something wrong with their mentality". Nevertheless, the album reached No.63 in the UK Albums Chart.

== Track listing ==
=== Side One ===
1. Introduction
2. Brian Song
3. The Wise Men at the Manger
4. Brian Song (cont.)
5. Sermon on the Mount (Big Nose)
6. Stone Salesman
7. Stoning
8. Ex-Leper
9. You Mean You Were Raped? (Nortius Maximus)
10. Revolutionaries in the Amphitheatre (Loretta)
11. Romans Go Home
12. What Have The Romans Ever Done For Us?
13. Ben
14. Brian Before Pilate (Thwow Him to the Floor)

=== Side Two ===
1. Prophets
2. Beard Salesman
3. Brian's Prophecy
4. The Hermit
5. He's Not the Messiah, He's a Very Naughty Boy
6. Pilate Sentences Brian
7. Nisus Wettus
8. Pilate with the Crowd (Welease Wodger)
9. Nisus Wettus with the Gaolers
10. Release Brian
11. Not So Bad Once You're Up
12. Revs Salute Brian
13. Cheeky is Released
14. "Look on the Bright Side of Life (All Things Dull and Ugly)"

=== 2006 Bonus Tracks ===
1. Otto Sketch
2. Otto Song
3. Otto Song Demo (Python Sings)
4. Brian Song [Alternate Version]
5. Radio Ad - Record Shop
6. Radio Ad - Twice As Good

== Charts ==
Chart (1979)	Peak position
Australia (Kent Music Report)	11
United Kingdom (Official Charts Company)	63

== Certifications ==
Region	Certification	Certified units/sales
Australia (ARIA)	Platinum	50,000^{^}
^{^} Shipments figures based on certification alone.
