= The Album of the Soundtrack of the Trailer of the Film of Monty Python and the Holy Grail =

Soundtrack album by Monty Python
- Released: 18 July 1975 (UK); 21 July 1975 (US)
- Recorded: 1974 (soundtrack) and 25 March 1975 (studio material) at Sunrise Music And Recording Ltd., London
- Genre: Comedy; soundtrack
- Length: 47:06
- Label: Charisma (UK); Arista (US)
- Producer: Andre Jacquemin; Dave Howman; Michael Palin; Terry Jones; Terry Gilliam

Monty Python chronology
Monty Python Live at Drury Lane (1974)	The Album of the Soundtrack of the Trailer of the Film of Monty Python and the Holy Grail (1975)	Monty Python Live at City Center (1976)

Professional ratings
Review scores
Source	Rating
Allmusic	4.5/5 stars

The Album of the Soundtrack of the Trailer of the Film of Monty Python and the Holy Grail is the first film soundtrack album by Monty Python, released in 1975. It features selected scenes from Monty Python and the Holy Grail interspersed with a large volume of new studio material, much of which centers on a spoof screening of the film at the Classic Silbury Hill Theatre. Also among the new items is the "Marilyn Monroe" sketch, which Graham Chapman co-wrote with Douglas Adams – the pair having recently collaborated on the fourth series of Monty Python.

The album is billed as the 'Executive Version' as a joke on popular 'special editions' of albums that contained extra tracks unavailable on earlier versions. Naturally, no other version of this album existed when it was originally released. On the A-side of the original UK vinyl release, the engraved text by George Peckham around the label reads: "AN EXECUTIVE PORKY PRIME CUT", while on the B-side it reads: "THIS IS THE SMALL DETAILED WRITING ON THE RECORD OF THE ALBUM OF THE SOUNDTRACK OF THE TRAILER OF THE FILM OF MONTY PYTHON AND THE HOLY GRAIL – THIS WRITING IS NOT INCLUDED ON THE EXECUTIVE VERSION OF THE ALBUM OF THE SOUNDTRACK OF THE TRAILER OF THE FILM OF MONTY PYTHON AND THE HOLY GRAIL".

The album reached No. 45 in the UK album charts.

A CD reissue in 1997 contains extended versions of two sketches, "Arrival at Castle" and "French Taunter"; this CD reissue also contains "The Bridge of Death". These additions are not available on any other version of the album.

In 2006, a special edition was released containing three bonus tracks, consisting of two demos of unused Neil Innes songs and an audio extract of a documentary from the film's DVD release. This version of the CD does not contain "The Bridge of Death" or the two extended sketches.

Also in 2006, yet another CD reissue was included within Monty Python and the Holy Grail: 'The Extraordinarily Deluxe DVD Edition'. The bonus features disc had instructions on how to play the record; this CD does not contain "The Bridge of Death", the bonus tracks, or the two extended versions.

A limited edition picture disc of the album was released on 29 August 2020, as part of Record Store Day. This added the film's 40th anniversary trailer to the start of the album.

== Track listing ==
=== Side One ===
1. Introduction to the Executive Version
2. Tour of the Classic Silbury Hill Theatre
3. Live Broadcast from London: Premiere of the Film
4. Narration from the Silbury Hill Gentlemen's Room
5. Arrival at Castle (extended version on 1997 CD)
6. Bring Out Your Dead
7. Constitutional Peasants
8. Witch Burning
9. Logician
10. Camelot Song
11. The Quest for the Holy Grail
12. Live from the Parking Lot at the Silbury Hill Theatre
13. French Taunter (extended version on 1997 CD)
14. Bomb Scare

=== Side Two ===
1. This Is Side Two!
2. Executive Version Announcement – Apology
3. The Story So Far
4. Brave Sir Robin
5. The Knights Who Say Ni!
6. Marilyn Monroe
7. Swamp Castle
8. Tim the Enchanter
9. Drama Critique
10. Holy Hand Grenade of Antioch
11. The Bridge of Death (1997 CD version only)
12. Executive Version Addendum
13. French Taunter – Part 2
14. Last Word

=== Bonus tracks on the 2006 special edition ===
1. Arthur's Song
2. Documentary - Terry Jones And Michael Palin
3. Run Away Song

== Music credits ==
The following is the list of musical works included on the album. They comprise a mixture of De Wolfe library music, self-penned Python songs and specially composed music by Neil Innes.

1. Jeunesse (A. Mawer)
2. Honours List (K. Papworth)
3. Big Country (K. Papworth)
4. Homeward Bound (T. Trombey)
5. God Choir (Neil Innes)
6. Fanfare (Neil Innes)
7. Camelot Song (Graham Chapman, John Cleese & Neil Innes)
8. Sunrise Music (Neil Innes)
9. Magic Finger (K. Papworth)
10. Sir Robin's Song (Eric Idle & Neil Innes)
11. In The Shadows (No.3) (Paul Ferris)
12. Desperate Moment (K. Essex)
13. Knights Of Ni (Neil Innes)
14. Circle Of Danger (B. Holmes)
15. Love Theme (P. Knight)
16. Magenta (R. Webb)
17. Starlet In The Starlight (K. Essex)
18. Monks Chant (Neil Innes)
19. The Promised Land (S. Black)
