= Live at Drury Lane =

Monty Python Live at Drury Lane

Live album by Monty Python
- Released: 28 June 1974 (UK)
- Recorded: 23 March 1974 (live recording) at Theatre Royal, Drury Lane & 1974 (studio recording) at Sunrise Music, London
- Genre: Comedy
- Length: 61:19
- Label: Charisma
- Producer: Andre Jacquemin; Dave Howman; Alan Bailey

Monty Python chronology
The Monty Python Matching Tie and Handkerchief (1973)	Monty Python Live at Drury Lane (1974)	The Album of the Soundtrack of the Trailer of the Film of Monty Python and the Holy Grail (1975)

Professional ratings
Review scores
Source	Rating
Allmusic	4/5 stars

Monty Python Live at Drury Lane is a live album released by Monty Python in 1974. It was recorded on the final night of their four-week run at the Drury Lane Theatre in London earlier that year and edited onto disc with new studio linking material by Eric Idle and Michael Palin. The majority of the sketches are from Flying Circus and vary slightly from their television counterparts, although "Cocktail Bar" was written for the third series but not used. The team also revived sketches from At Last The 1948 Show, including "Secret Service", "Wrestling" and "Four Yorkshiremen" – the latter on its way to being adopted as a Python standard. Neil Innes provided the musical interludes, while Eric Idle's then wife Lyn Ashley replaced regular Python actress Carol Cleveland in supporting roles.

As with its predecessor, the second side of the original UK vinyl release had a cryptic message by George Peckham etched onto the runout groove, which read "THE WONDERFUL WORLD OF PORKY TRISHY MELLY YEAH". This message was missing from the second pressings, the label of which added the musical titles used on the album (notably for the many songs referenced in "Election Special").

To promote the album's release, a double-sided 33 rpm Flexi disc was issued free with the 25 May 1974 edition of New Musical Express entitled Monty Python's Tiny Black Round Thing which contained an extended version of "Election Special" and "Lumberjack Song" with new linking material from Michael Palin.

The album was the group's most successful to date, reaching No. 19 in the UK Albums Chart.

The album was released in Canada in 1975 (distributed by GRT of Canada Ltd. 9211-4) but was not issued in the US until 1994, when it was included in the box set The Instant Monty Python CD Collection. Until then, the only live Python album released in the US had been Monty Python Live at City Center, released in 1976.

The album's cover was designed by Terry Gilliam's assistant Katy Hepburn (misspelled as "Hebbern" on the back cover). Three decades later, it made a surprise appearance in Gilliam's 2005 film Tideland, where it can be seen at the front of a box of LPs.

The performance featured Eric Idle muttering "Breakaway!" during the "Nudge, Nudge" sketch (Idle was advertising the Breakaway chocolate bar at this time), which resulted in an unexpectedly strong laugh from the audience. This moment was removed from subsequent compilations.

Although originally released in stereo, the 2006 special edition CD has the whole album mixed into mono. This is the only one of the 2006 reissues to contain no new material, with the exception of an interview placed at the end of the disc.

A limited edition 50th anniversary picture disc was released on 20 April 2024, as part of Record Store Day. This contains the album's original stereo mix.

== Track listing ==
=== Side one ===
1. Introduction
2. Llamas
3. Gumby – Flower Arranging
4. Secret Service
5. Wrestling
6. Communist Quiz
7. Idiot Song
8. Albatross
9. Colonel
10. Nudge, Nudge
11. Cocktail Bar
12. Travel Agent

=== Side two ===
1. Spot the Brain Cell
2. Bruces
3. Argument
4. I've Got Two Legs
5. Four Yorkshiremen
6. Election Special
7. Lumberjack Song
8. Parrot Sketch

An interview is added to the 2006 special edition

== Personnel ==
- Graham Chapman
- John Cleese
- Terry Gilliam
- Eric Idle
- Terry Jones
- Michael Palin

=== Additional performers ===
- Lyn Ashley
- Neil Innes

== Music credits ==
The following is the list of musical works included on the album. They comprise a mixture of Studio G, Keith Prowse and De Wolfe library music, self-penned Python and Neil Innes songs and short extracts of famous songs referenced in "Election Special".

1. Granada (Dorothy Dodd & Agustin Lara)
2. Happy Movement (J. Harpham)
3. World In Action (K. Mansfield)
4. Idiot Song (Neil Innes)
5. Comic Giggles (J. Pearson)
6. Bruces Song (Eric Idle)
7. I've Got Two Legs (Terry Gilliam)
8. Prestige Theme (K. Mansfield)
9. We'll Keep a Welcome (Mai Jones, Lyn Joshua & James Harper)
10. Raindrops Keep Falling On My Head (Burt Bacharach & Hal David)
11. Don't Sleep In The Subway (Tony Hatch & Jackie Trent)
12. Climb Every Mountain (Richard Rodgers & Oscar Hammerstein II)
13. Lumberjack Song (Michael Palin, Terry Jones & Fred Tomlinson)
14. Liberty Bell (John Philip Sousa, arr. Sheriff)

== Certifications ==
Region	Certification	Certified units/sales
United Kingdom (BPI)	Silver	60,000^{^}
^{^} Shipments figures based on certification alone.
