= The Lumberjack Song =

"Lumberjack Song"

Single by Monty Python
- B-side: "Spam Song"
- Released: 14 November 1975
- Recorded: 3 October 1975 at the Work House, London
- Genre: Comedy
- Label: Charisma
- Songwriters: Michael Palin; Terry Jones; Fred Tomlinson
- Producer: George Harrison

Monty Python singles chronology
"Monty Python's Tiny Black Round Thing" (1974)	"Lumberjack Song" (1975)	"Python On Song" (1976)

"The Lumberjack Song" is a comedy song by the comedy troupe Monty Python. The song was written and composed by Terry Jones, Michael Palin, and Fred Tomlinson.

It first appeared in the ninth episode of Monty Python's Flying Circus, "The Ant: An Introduction" on BBC1 on 14 December 1969. The song has since been performed in several forms, including film, stage, and LP, each time started from a different skit. At an NPR interview in 2007, Palin stated that the scene and the whole song were created in about 15 minutes, concluding a day's work, when the Python crew was stuck and unable to come up with a conclusion to the barbershop sketch that preceded it.

On 14 November 1975, "The Lumberjack Song" was released as a single in the UK, on Charisma Records, backed with "Spam Song". The A-side, produced by Python devotee George Harrison, was recorded at the Work House studio in London on 3 October 1975 and mixed at Harrison's Friar Park home the following day. A year later this single was reissued on 19 November 1976 as the first half of the double single release Python On Song. This version of the song has never been released on CD, although a remix containing alternate vocal takes from the session was included on the compilation album Monty Python Sings.

== Synopsis ==
Michael Palin performs "The Lumberjack Song", with Connie Booth as his "best girl."

The common theme was of an average man (usually Michael Palin, but in many live versions by Eric Idle) who expresses dissatisfaction with his current job (as a barber, weatherman, pet shop owner, etc.) and then announces, "I didn't want to be [the given profession]. I wanted to be... a lumberjack!" He proceeds to talk about the life of a lumberjack ("Leaping from tree to tree"), and lists various trees (e.g. larch, fir, Scots pine, and others that do not actually exist). Ripping off his coat to reveal a red flannel shirt, he walks over to a stage with a coniferous forest backdrop and begins to sing about the wonders of being a lumberjack in British Columbia. Then he is unexpectedly backed up by a small choir of male singers, all dressed as Royal Canadian Mounted Police (several were regular Python performers, while the rest were generally members of an actual singing troupe, such as the Fred Tomlinson Singers in the TV version).

In the original sketch from the programme and film version, the girl is played by Connie Booth, John Cleese's then-wife; in the live version, the girl is played by Python regular Carol Cleveland. In the version from the film And Now For Something Completely Different, it follows on from the "Dead Parrot sketch" with Palin's character leaving the pet shop as Eric Praline (played by John Cleese) asks "I'm sorry, this is irrelevant, isn't it?" and eventually "What about my bloody parrot?!".

In the song, the Lumberjack recounts his daily tasks and his personal life, such as having buttered scones for tea, and the Mountie chorus repeats his lines in sing-song fashion. However, as the song continues, he increasingly reveals cross-dressing tendencies ("I cut down trees, I skip and jump, I like to press wild flowers, I put on women's clothing, and hang around in bars"), which both distresses the girl and disturbs the confused Mounties, who continue to repeat and chorus his lines, albeit with increasing hesitance. The last straw comes when he mentions that he wears "high heels, suspenders, and a bra. I wish I'd been a girlie, just like my dear mama", and some of the Mounties stop repeating his lines, and they eventually walk off in disgust. Stunned by the Lumberjack's revelation, the girl cries out "Oh, Bevis! And I thought you were so rugged!" (in some versions, she says, "I thought you were so butch!" and sometimes slaps him) before running off. In And Now For Something Completely Different, at the end of the song the Lumberjack is pelted with rotten fruit and eggs by the Mounties, who can also be heard shouting insults. Another notable difference is that, in the original version, the Lumberjack wishes he was a girlie "just like my dear mama", whereas subsequent versions replace "mama" with "papa", implying that the lumberjack inherited his tendency for transvestism from his father.

At the end of the version in Flying Circus, a letter written by an outraged viewer (voiced by John Cleese) is shown to complain about the portrayal of lumberjacks in the sketch. The letter reads: "Dear Sir, I wish to complain in the strongest possible terms about the song which you have just broadcast about the lumberjack who wears women's clothes. Many of my best friends are lumberjacks, and only a few of them are transvestites. Yours faithfully, Brigadier Sir Charles Arthur Strong (Mrs.) P.S. I have never kissed the editor of the Radio Times." It then cuts to a vox pop of a screeching Pepperpot (Graham Chapman) voicing her objection of "all this sex on the television", exclaiming, "I keep falling off!" This is followed by an image of an award as text reading "That joke was nominated for this years Rubber Mac of Zurich Award. It came last" scrolls past. It then cuts to a Gumby (Chapman) in front of the forest set, who says, "Well, I think television's killed real entertainment. In the old days we used to make our own fun at Christmas parties. I used to strike myself on the head repeatedly with blunt instruments while crooning." He then proceeds to croon while striking himself in the head with bricks.

== Music ==
Part of the melody appears to be a direct quote from the English folk song Foggy Dew. The music is also similar to "Là ci darem la mano", Don Giovanni's and Zerlina's duet in Act 1, Scene 2, of Mozart's opera Don Giovanni.

== Performances ==
A German version of "The Lumberjack Song" was performed for the 1972 special Monty Python's Fliegender Zirkus, produced for German and Austrian television, for which Palin learned the German text phonetically, and the group of Mounties was replaced by a group of Austrian border guards. Instead of one of his parents, the German version credits the lumberjack's "Uncle Walter" as inspiring his passion for cross-dressing; this change was likely done simply for a rhyme with "Büstenhalter", the German translation for "bra", which caps the phrase preceding the "I wish I'd been a girlie..." line. (The subtitles on the A&E DVD release of this special quote the original English lyrics.) A German translation of the angry letter featured at the conclusion of the BBC TV version ends the sketch.

Another German translation is used in the German dub of the film And now for something completely different where the Lumberjack Song also appears. For example, whereas the Fliegender Zirkus version has the German chorus "Ich bin Holzfäller und fühl' mich stark, ich schlaf' des Nachts und hack' am Tag..." ("I'm a lumberjack and I feel strong, I sleep at night and I chop in the daytime...", which is the version still remembered by Palin today), the chorus in the German dub in And now for something completely different goes "Ich bin Holzfäller und mir geht's gut, am Tag packt mich die Arbeitswut..." ("I'm a lumberjack and I'm okay, I'm gripped by work mania throughout the day..."); it ends with the "my dear papa"-variant of the song, rhyming with the word "BH" (beːˈhaː), the German abbreviation for "Büstenhalter".

In Live at Drury Lane, this song follows on from "Election Night Special". In Monty Python Live at the Hollywood Bowl, this song ends the show, following on from "Dead Bishop".

A version of the song present in this sketch was made in Portugal for a Millennium Bank campaign. The lyrics were slightly changed and translated into Portuguese, as the bank at the time was making an offer involving planting trees.

A Spanish-language version of the song was created for a theatrical performance in 2004. The Yllana and Imprebis theatrical groups jointly presented a show at Madrid's Teatro Alfil, consisting of sketches adapted from the Monty Python repertoire. Their version of "The Lumberjack Song" was adapted for a Spanish audience so that the singer confessed not to having always wanted to be a lumberjack but having always wanted to join the Guardia Civil, the Spanish gendarmerie. A chorus of uniformed Guardia Civil officers replaced the Mounties from the original television performance.

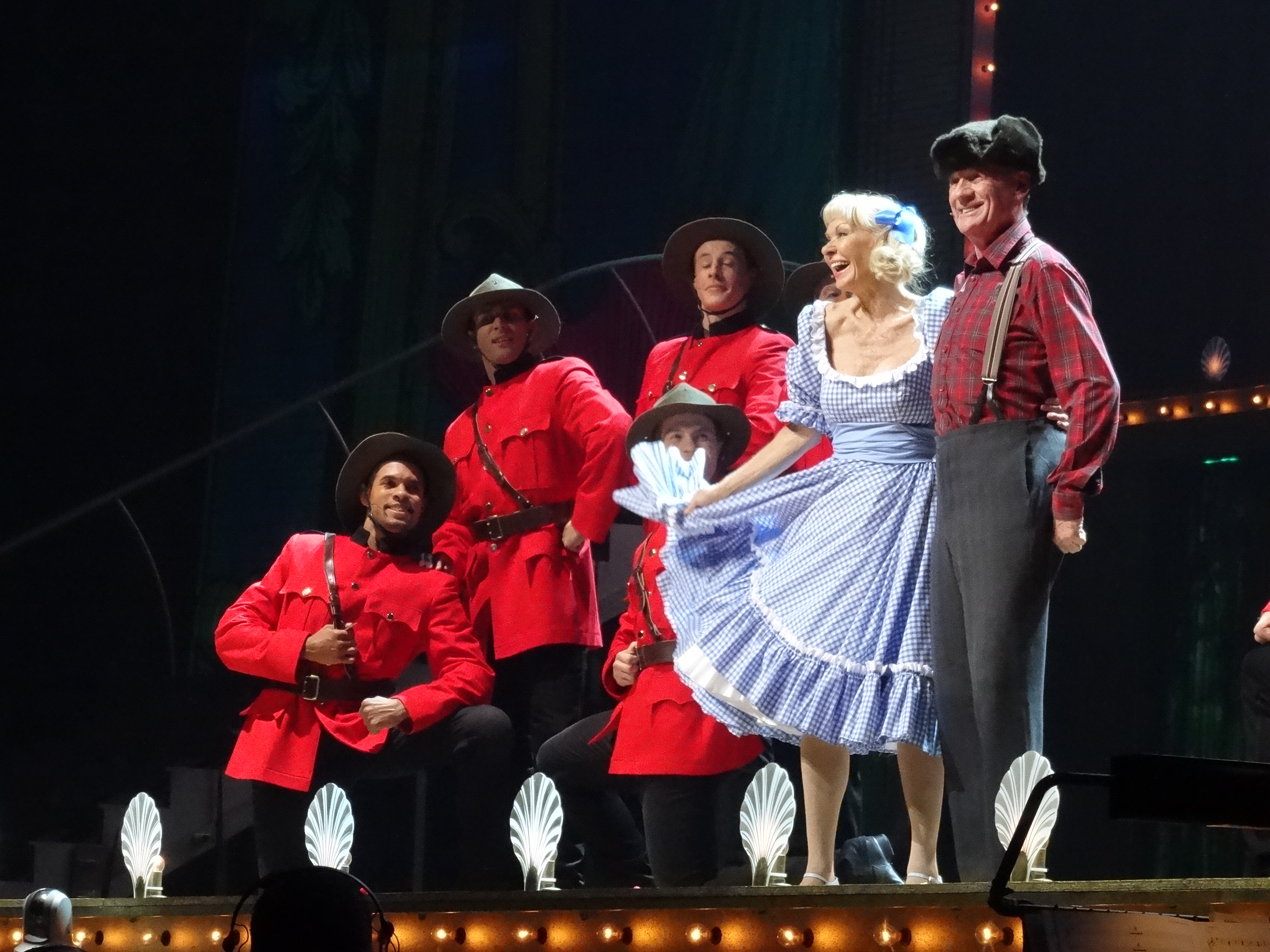
Carol Cleveland and Michael Palin perform "The Lumberjack Song" as part of Monty Python Live (Mostly) in July 2014

The song was performed at the Concert for George on 29 November 2002, the first anniversary of George Harrison's death. This performance featured Palin, Cleveland, Idle, Jones, Terry Gilliam, Neil Innes and special guest Tom Hanks. At the conclusion of the performance, the troupe turned to face a portrait of George Harrison projected on the back of the stage, and saluted him. During his 1974 North American tour, Harrison would play a recording of "The Lumberjack Song" over the arena public address systems before taking the stage to perform. In April 1976, while Monty Python were performing in New York, Harrison joined them onstage dressed as a Mountie for this song. Harrison also was the producer of the Python film Life of Brian.

In the Shining Time Station Christmas Special, Ringo Starr as Mr. Conductor is dressed in lumberjack attire, he sings the intro to the song, but changes the lyrics to "I'm a lumberjack and I'm all right."

The song was also performed by the Python members as an encore on the oratorio Not the Messiah (He's a Very Naughty Boy) at the Royal Albert Hall on 23 October 2009, with Palin doing the lead performance and with Terry Jones and Terry Gilliam in the Mounties chorus and Carol Cleveland as the best girl.

As of 2014, the most recent public performance of the song by Python members was in the Monty Python Live (Mostly) show in July 2014, with the same cast as in the 2009 performance. It follows on from the Vocational Guidance Counsellor sketch, with Palin's Mr. Anchovy turning into the lumberjack. Across the 10 shows, Palin would often claim following I wanted to be ... a different job than a Lumberjack [in the final performance, a systems analyst], but recalls a memory which led him to desire a job as a lumberjack, leading to the song. In other performances, Palin would simply sit silently for a period of time, with a confused expression, before announcing he wanted to be a lumberjack.

Various performances
Performance	Monty Python's Flying Circus [1969]	And Now for Something Completely Different [1971]	Live at Drury Lane [1974]	Pleasure at Her Majesty's [1976]	Live at City Centre [1976]	Live at the Hollywood Bowl [1982]	Eric Idle Sings Monty Python [2000]	Eric Idle Exploits Monty Python [2000]	Concert for George [2002]	Not the Messiah [2009]	Monty Python Live (Mostly) [2014]
I never wanted to..	..be a barber anyway.	..work in a pet-shop.	..do this for a living.	[The song begins by interrupting a Shakespeare sketch. Palin enters the stage, beginning from: "The smell of fresh-cut timber!"]	..do this in the first place. [carries on from the Salvation Fuzz sketch]	..be in such a shambolic sketch.	..be a musician.	..do this for a living.	..go on all night giving tributes.	.. be a Roman.	..be a lion tamer.
Number of Mounties	8	9	4	12	6	5	?	8	10	6	10

== Thematic successors ==
In Spamalot, the song "He is Not Yet Dead (playoff)" is thematically similar. Both feature a masculine man singing about seemingly masculine items, but gradually degrading, and both ending in the singer expressing a wish to wear "suspenders and a bra", and both choruses being disgusted at this point. In Not the Messiah (He's a Very Naughty Boy), the song "A Fair Day's Work" makes references to "The Lumberjack Song", with Eric Idle singing about the masculine virtues of work, but also of dressing in women's clothing to go to "naughty bars". The chorus responds: "That's enough of that, okay. We don't give a duck if you're completely gay."

In "Truck Drivin' Song" by Weird Al Yankovic a similar theme has a deep voiced singer starting to sing about very masculine activities juxtaposed with applying make-up and wearing high heeled shoes.

The French rock band Underzut pays homage to the Monty Python with two songs including "Lumberjack" (and also "Bicycle Repairman") on the album "Bubbles in my blood". Both titles were the subject of video clips.
