= The Hastily Cobbled Together for a Fast Buck Album =

Unreleased album by Monty Python

Monty Python's Hastily Cobbled Together for a Fast Buck Album
- Bootleg cover art

Studio album by Monty Python
- Genre: Comedy
- Length: 53:22

Hastily Cobbled Together for a Fast Buck is the name of a bootleg of an unreleased album by Monty Python, mostly made up of outtakes from the 1980 sessions for their Contractual Obligation Album. The album was compiled by producer Andre Jacquemin in 1987 but pulled from release in favour of a compilation of previously released material, The Final Rip Off.

As with material that made the final cut of the Contractual Obligation Album, the outtakes include re-recordings of material which predates Monty Python. "Bunn, Wackett, Buzzard, Stubble and Boot", the title of which was among the many rejected suggestions for the name of Monty Python's Flying Circus, dates back to John Cleese's college days. "Adventure" originates from The Frost Report, while At Last the 1948 Show was plundered for "Freelance Undertaker" and "Memory Training", the latter featuring a newly written coda containing a list of the towns where Monty Python's Life of Brian was banned. Another sketch, "Indian Restaurant", was revived from the TV special How to Irritate People. Despite its name, "Accountancy Shanty" is not an early version of the song which would feature in The Crimson Permanent Assurance but a re-recording of a song from Rutland Weekend Television, with Terry Jones performing the lead vocal originally sung by Neil Innes.

The album also features material from the early drafts of Life of Brian, some of which was published in the film's accompanying scrap book. These include "Psychopath" (adapted to a modern-day setting) and "Headmaster". The "Otto" sketch and accompanying song are from the soundtrack of a deleted scene from the film.

Terry Gilliam's 1974 studio recording of "I've Got Two Legs" was the first track from the album to get an official release when it featured on the 1989 compilation Monty Python Sings (with an added introduction from Eric Idle). In 1997 two further tracks, "Mrs Particle and Mrs Velocity" and "Psychopath", were featured on the Monty Python's The Meaning of Life video game, alongside a further previously unreleased sketch.

In 2005 it was announced that Jacquemin was preparing an expanded version of Hastily Cobbled Together for a Fast Buck for official release. However, this was once again cancelled. The following year saw the release of special edition CDs of eight Monty Python albums, with added bonus tracks which included "I'm So Worried (Country & Western Version)", "Otto Sketch", "Otto Song", "Psychopath", "Baxter's", "Freelance Undertaker" and "Radio Shop", among further previously unreleased tracks. In 2014 the songs "Rainy Day in Berlin" and "Rudyard Kipling" appeared as two of three outtakes added to Monty Python Sings (Again). The remaining tracks on the album remain unreleased.

== Track listing ==
=== Side one ===
1. "An Announcer"
2. "Here Comes Another One" (vocoder version)
3. "I'm So Worried" (Country & Western version)
4. "Mrs. Particle and Mrs. Velocity"
5. "Otto Sketch"
6. "Otto Song"
7. "Rooting Around in My Attic"
8. "Psychopath"
9. "Olympic Shopping"
10. "Bunn, Wackett, Buzzard, Stubble and Boot"
11. "Talking Science"
12. "School Song"
13. "Headmaster"
14. "Laughing at the Unfortunate"

=== Side two ===
1. "Rainy Day in Berlin" (not included on most bootlegged versions)
2. "I've Got Two Legs"
3. "Amputation"
4. "Adventure"
5. "Accountancy Shanty"
6. "Indian Restaurant"
7. "Baxter's"
8. "Freelance Undertaker"
9. "Rudyard Kipling"
10. "Apology"
11. "Memory Training"
12. "Acronyms"
13. "Radio Shop"
