= Monty Python Sings =

Compilation album by Monty Python
- Released: 11 December 1989 (UK)
- Recorded: 1971–1989
- Genre: Comedy
- Length: 54:16 (1989); 1:08:58 (2014)
- Label: Virgin
- Producer: Eric Idle, Andre Jacquemin

Monty Python chronology
The Final Rip Off (1987)	Monty Python Sings (1989)	The Ultimate Monty Python Rip Off (1994)

Professional ratings
Review scores
Source	Rating
AllMusic	4/5 stars
Robert Christgau	A−

Monty Python Sings is a compilation album of songs by English comedy troupe Monty Python. Released in 1989 to celebrate their 20th anniversary, it contains popular songs from their previous albums and films. The album was dedicated to the memory of founding member Graham Chapman, who died two months before its release.

== Songs ==
The album contained two previously unreleased tracks: "Oliver Cromwell" (originally performed by John Cleese on the 1960s radio series I'm Sorry, I'll Read That Again) was recorded during sessions for Monty Python's Contractual Obligation Album in 1980, while a studio recording of Terry Gilliam's live standard "I've Got Two Legs" was recorded in 1974 for the Drury Lane shows, where it was to be mimed onstage, but discarded once Gilliam decided to perform it live instead. The album also has a longer version of "Medical Love Song," with added instrumentation and previously unheard verses which mix out Eric Idle's guide vocals and push Graham Chapman's lead vocal to the forefront. The remixes of "Sit on My Face" and the extended "Henry Kissinger" from The Final Rip Off were also used, as well as a new mix of "Bruces' Philosophers Song (Bruces' Song)" and a remix of the 1975 George Harrison-produced single version of "The Lumberjack Song", featuring some alternate vocal takes. This was the first compilation to include tracks from the Life of Brian and The Meaning of Life soundtracks, albeit in remixed form. "Every Sperm Is Sacred" is the extended version, previously only available on the B-side of the 7-inch single of "Galaxy Song".

== Artwork ==
The cover design by Terry Gilliam marked his first original album artwork since 1977's Instant Record Collection. The original vinyl release contained a booklet featuring illustrated lyrics to all the songs.

== Reissues ==
Although the album did not chart on its original 1989 release, it was re-promoted following the successful reissue of "Always Look on the Bright Side of Life" in 1991, when it reached No. 62 in the UK Albums Chart.

On 30 June 2014, the album was re-released as Monty Python Sings (Again) on CD and as a digital download, expanded with six additional recordings: three out-takes from Monty Python's Contractual Obligation Album and three new tracks from Eric Idle, recorded for inclusion in the team's reunion shows Monty Python Live (Mostly). A deluxe edition in both formats also included the 1970 Monty Python's Flying Circus album. This version of the album reached No. 35 in the UK Albums Chart.

To celebrate the team's 50th anniversary, a double vinyl album set of Monty Python Sings (Again) was released on 4 October 2019, now including the Stephen Hawking version of "Galaxy Song," first released as a limited edition 7-inch single for Record Store Day on 18 April 2015.

== Track listing ==
=== Monty Python Sings (1989) ===
No.	Title	Writer(s)	Original release	Length
1.	"Always Look on the Bright Side of Life"	Eric Idle	Monty Python's Life of Brian	3:33
2.	"Sit on My Face"	Music: Harry Parr Davies; Lyrics: Idle	Monty Python's Contractual Obligation Album	0:45
3.	"Lumberjack Song (Alternate Take)"	Music: Terry Jones/Michael Palin/Fred Tomlinson; Lyrics: Jones/Palin	Previously unreleased	3:20
4.	"Penis Song (Not the Noel Coward Song)"	Idle	Monty Python's The Meaning of Life	0:41
5.	"Oliver Cromwell"	Music: Frédéric Chopin (interpolating Polonaise in A-flat major, Op. 53); Lyrics: John Cleese	Previously unreleased; recorded 1980	4:10
6.	"Money Song"	Music: John Gould; Lyrics: Idle/Gould	Monty Python's Previous Record	0:52
7.	"Accountancy Shanty"	Idle/John Du Prez	Monty Python's The Meaning of Life	1:16
8.	"Finland"	Palin	Monty Python's Contractual Obligation Album	2:01
9.	"Medical Love Song"	Music: Idle/Du Prez; Lyrics: Graham Chapman/Idle	Monty Python's Contractual Obligation Album	3:31
10.	"I'm So Worried"	Jones	Monty Python's Contractual Obligation Album	3:20
11.	"Every Sperm Is Sacred"	Music: David Howman/Andre Jacquemin; Lyrics: Palin/Jones	Monty Python's The Meaning of Life	4:34
12.	"Never Be Rude to an Arab"	Jones	Monty Python's Contractual Obligation Album	1:00
13.	"I Like Chinese"	Idle	Monty Python's Contractual Obligation Album	3:10
14.	"Eric the Half-a-Bee"	Music: Idle; Lyrics: Idle/Cleese	Monty Python's Previous Record	2:06
15.	"Brian Song"	Music: Jacquemin/Howman; Lyrics: Palin	Monty Python's Life of Brian	2:35
16.	"Bruces' Philosophers Song (Bruces' Song)"	Idle	The Monty Python Matching Tie and Handkerchief	0:52
17.	"The Meaning of Life"	Music: Idle/Du Prez; Lyrics: Idle	Monty Python's The Meaning of Life	2:15
18.	"Knights of the Round Table (Camelot Song)"	Music: Neil Innes; Lyrics: Chapman/Cleese	Monty Python and the Holy Grail	1:06
19.	"All Things Dull and Ugly"	Music: Traditional; Lyrics: Idle	Monty Python's Contractual Obligation Album	1:33
20.	"Decomposing Composers"	Palin	Monty Python's Contractual Obligation Album	2:48
21.	"Henry Kissinger (Extended Version)"	Idle	The Final Rip-Off	1:28
22.	"I've Got Two Legs"	Terry Gilliam	Previously unreleased; recorded 1974	0:33
23.	"Christmas in Heaven (Extended Version)"	Music: Idle; Lyrics: Jones	Monty Python's The Meaning of Life	2:45
24.	"Galaxy Song"	Music: Idle/Du Prez; Lyrics: Idle	Monty Python's The Meaning of Life	2:41
25.	"Spam Song"	Music: Palin/Jones/Tomlinson; Lyrics: Palin/Jones	Another Monty Python Record	0:32

=== Monty Python Sings (Again) (2014) ===
New to the 2014 "Revised Edition" are tracks 3, 13, 18, 19, 26 and 30.

No.	Title	Writer(s)	Original release	Length
1.	"Always Look on the Bright Side of Life"	Eric Idle	Monty Python's Life of Brian	3:35
2.	"The Meaning of Life"	Music: Idle/John Du Prez; Lyrics: Idle	Monty Python's The Meaning of Life	2:17
3.	"The Silly Walk Song"	Idle/Du Prez	Previously unreleased	2:01
4.	"Penis Song (Not the Noel Coward Song)"	Idle	Monty Python's The Meaning of Life	0:42
5.	"Money Song"	Music: John Gould; Lyrics: Idle/Gould	Monty Python's Previous Record	0:55
6.	"Oliver Cromwell"	Music: Frédéric Chopin (interpolating Polonaise in A-flat major, Op. 53); Lyrics: John Cleese	Monty Python Sings	4:10
7.	"Accountancy Shanty"	Idle/Du Prez	Monty Python's The Meaning of Life	1:17
8.	"Finland"	Michael Palin	Monty Python's Contractual Obligation Album	2:03
9.	"Medical Love Song"	Music: Idle/Du Prez; Lyrics: Graham Chapman/Idle	Monty Python's Contractual Obligation Album	3:34
10.	"I'm So Worried"	Terry Jones	Monty Python's Contractual Obligation Album	3:19
11.	"Every Sperm Is Sacred"	Music: David Howman/Andre Jacquemin; Lyrics: Palin/Jones	Monty Python's The Meaning of Life	4:36
12.	"I Like Chinese"	Idle	Monty Python's Contractual Obligation Album	3:12
13.	"The Naval Medley"	Idle/Du Prez	Previously unreleased	3:25
14.	"Sit on My Face"	Music: Harry Parr Davies; Lyrics: Idle	Monty Python's Contractual Obligation Album	0:46
15.	"Never Be Rude to an Arab"	Jones	Monty Python's Contractual Obligation Album	1:03
16.	"Eric the Half-a-Bee"	Music: Idle; Lyrics: Idle/Cleese	Monty Python's Previous Record	2:09
17.	"Brian Song"	Music: Jacquemin/Howman; Lyrics: Palin	Monty Python's Life of Brian	2:39
18.	"Rudyard Kipling"	Palin	Previously unreleased; recorded 1980	3:10
19.	"Nudge Rap / Blackmail"	Idle/Du Prez	Previously unreleased	1:47
20.	"Bruces' Philosophers Song"	Idle	The Monty Python Matching Tie and Handkerchief	0:54
21.	"Knights of the Round Table (Camelot Song)"	Music: Neil Innes; Lyrics: Chapman/Cleese	Monty Python and the Holy Grail	1:06
22.	"All Things Dull and Ugly"	Music: Traditional (parodying the hymn "All Things Bright and Beautiful"); Lyrics: Idle	Monty Python's Contractual Obligation Album	1:35
23.	"Decomposing Composers"	Palin	Monty Python's Contractual Obligation Album	2:46
24.	"Henry Kissinger"	Idle	Monty Python's Contractual Obligation Album	1:31
25.	"I've Got Two Legs"	Terry Gilliam	Monty Python Sings	0:34
26.	"Rainy Day in Berlin"	Idle	Previously unreleased; recorded 1980	1:58
27.	"Christmas in Heaven"	Music: Idle; Lyrics: Jones	Monty Python's The Meaning of Life	2:46
28.	"Galaxy Song"	Music: Idle/Du Prez; Lyrics: Idle	Monty Python's The Meaning of Life	2:43
29.	"Spam Song"	Music: Palin/Jones/Fred Tomlinson; Lyrics: Palin/Jones	Another Monty Python Record	0:33
30.	"Lousy Song"	Chapman/Idle	Previously unreleased; recorded 1980	2:09
31.	"Lumberjack Song"	Music: Jones/Palin/Tomlinson; Lyrics: Jones/Palin	Single A-side	3:23

==== 2019 LP version bonus track ====
No.	Title	Writer(s)	Original release	Length
32.	"Stephen Hawking Sings Monty Python... Galaxy Song"	Music: Idle/Du Prez; Lyrics: Idle	Single A-side for Record Store Day 2015	2:42

== Personnel ==
Performers

- Graham Chapman
- John Cleese
- Terry Gilliam
- Eric Idle
- Terry Jones
- Michael Palin

Additional performers

- Sonia Jones ("Brian Song", "The Silly Walk Song", "Nudge Rap/Blackmail")
- John Du Prez ("The Silly Walk Song")
- Bob Saker ("The Silly Walk Song")
- Tim Whitnall ("The Silly Walk Song")
- Jamie Lisa Jacquemin ("The Silly Walk Song", "Nudge Rap/Blackmail")

Technical

- John Du Prez – arranger ("The Silly Walk Song", "Finland", "Medical Love Song", "I'm So Worried", "I Like Chinese", "The Naval Medley", "Sit on My Face", "Never Be Rude to an Arab", "Decomposing Composers", "Henry Kissinger", "Rainy Day in Berlin", "Lousy Song"), producer ("The Naval Medley"), mixing ("The Naval Medley")
- Neil Innes – arranger
- John Altman – arranger
- Mike McNaught – arranger
- Fred Tomlinson – arranger ("Money Song", "Spam", "Lumberjack Song")
- Eric Idle – producer
- Andre Jacquemin – producer, engineer, mixing
- James Saunders – recording assistant
- Kath James – co-ordinator
- Kay Gee Bee Music Ltd. – illustration
- TDC – layout
- Holly Gilliam – project coordinator (2014 edition)
- Terry Gilliam – cover artwork, packaging design, layout (2014 edition)
- Ric Lipson – packaging design, layout (2014 edition)
- Darren Evans – additional artwork and design (2014 edition)
- Andy Gotts – Monty Python group photo (2014 edition)
- Robert Ross – notes (2014 edition)
- Giselle Berger – notes transcription (2014 edition)
- Sean Magee – mastering (2014 edition)
