= The Final Rip Off =

Compilation album by Monty Python
- Released: 30 November 1987 (UK)
- Recorded: 1971–1987
- Genre: Comedy
- Length: 116:00
- Label: Virgin
- Compiler: Andre Jacquemin

Monty Python chronology
Monty Python's The Meaning of Life (1983)	The Final Rip Off (1987)	Monty Python Sings (1989)

Professional ratings
Review scores
Source	Rating
AllMusic	5/5 stars
New Musical Express	0/10

The Final Rip Off is a compilation double album by Monty Python, released in 1987. It was the team's first release on Virgin Records, after the label acquired the rights to their back catalogue previously released on Charisma. The set contains material from those six albums, but not from the Life of Brian or The Meaning of Life soundtracks, which were released on other labels. Michael Palin added some new linking material while all the songs were remixed by producer Andre Jacquemin including one, "Henry Kissinger", which featured a previously unreleased section. Contrastingly, the selections from Another Monty Python Record and Live at Drury Lane were mixed from stereo into mono. The cover art, with its graphic image of spilling guts, was illustrated by Les Edwards.

== Track listing ==
=== Side one ===
1. Introduction
2. Constitutional Peasant
3. Fish Licence
4. Eric the Half-a-Bee Song (remix)
5. Finland Song (remix)
6. Travel Agent
7. Are You Embarrassed Easily?
8. Australian Table Wines
9. Argument
10. Henry Kissinger Song (extended remix)
11. Parrot (Oh, Not Again) (mono mix)

=== Side two ===
1. Sit On My Face (remix)
2. Undertaker (mono mix)
3. Novel Writing (Live From Wessex)
4. Announcement (unlisted)
5. String
6. Bells
7. Traffic Lights
8. Cocktail Bar (mono mix)
9. Four Yorkshiremen (mono mix)
10. Election Special (mono mix)
11. Lumberjack Song (mono mix)

=== Side three ===
1. I Like Chinese (remix)
2. Spanish Inquisition Part 1 (mono mix)
3. Cheese Shop (remix)
4. Cherry Orchard (mono mix)
5. Architects Sketch (mono mix)
6. Spanish Inquisition Part 2 (mono mix)
7. Spam (mono mix)
8. Spanish Inquisition Part 3 (mono mix)
9. Comfy Chair (mono mix)
10. Famous Person Quiz (mono mix)
11. You Be the Actor (mono mix)
12. Nudge Nudge (mono mix)
13. Cannibalism (mono mix)
14. Spanish Inquisition Revisited (mono mix)

=== Side four ===
1. I Bet You They Won't Play This Song on the Radio (remix)
2. Bruces
3. Bookshop
4. Do Wot John (remix)
5. Rock Notes
6. I'm So Worried (remix)
7. Crocodile
8. French Taunter
9. Marilyn Monroe
10. Swamp Castle
11. French Taunter Part 2
12. Last Word
