= Fuck you very much =

Fuck you very much may refer to:

- FCC Song, by Eric Idle (2004)
- Fuck You (Lily Allen song) (2009)
- Celebrated Queer/gay drag performer Divine: As a part of their performance, they constantly swore at the audience, historically, and often using their signature line of "fuck you very much."
