= Decomposing Composers =

Monty Python sketch

"Decomposing Composers" is a Monty Python comedic song released on Monty Python's Contractual Obligation Album and the Monty Python Sings album. It was written and composed by Michael Palin and arranged by John Du Prez.

== The song ==
Palin sings the song in what appears to be the persona of Luigi Vercotti, a seedy character who appeared in some sketches in the TV show Monty Python's Flying Circus, notably "Ethel the Frog" and "Ron Obvious".

The backing to the song is based on Pachelbel's Canon, and in the final spoken coda, there is a medley of classical favourites in the background. An interlude in the middle of the song consists of an attempt to play Beethoven's 5th Symphony, which keeps starting up and winding down, possibly to add to the death humour of the song.

After an initial spoken section where Luigi talks to his wife on the phone, he summarizes various classical composers who are all dead. He mentions (in order of mentioning): Beethoven, Mozart, Liszt, Brahms, Elgar, Schubert, Chopin, Handel, Haydn, Rachmaninov, Verdi, Wagner and Debussy. The final, spoken coda to the song includes another list of composers, complete with their death date. He mentions:

- Claude Achille Debussy, "died 1918".
- Christoph Willibald Gluck, "died 1787".
- Carl Maria von Weber, "not at all well 1825, died 1826".
- Giacomo Meyerbeer, "still alive 1863, not still alive 1864".
- Modest Mussorgsky, "1880: going to parties. No fun anymore 1881".
- Johann Nepomuk Hummel, "chatting away nineteen to the dozen with his mates down the pub every evening 1836. 1837: nothing".

During this final coda various short snippets of famous classical pieces can be heard, namely the 1st movement of Johann Sebastian Bach's "3rd Brandenburg Concerto", Pyotr Ilyich Tchaikovsky's finale from the Swan Lake and the rondo from Wolfgang Amadeus Mozart's 4th Horn Concerto.
