= Oliver Cromwell (song) =

Song released by Monty Python in 1989

"Oliver Cromwell" is a song recorded by Monty Python in 1980 but not released until 1989 where it featured on their compilation album Monty Python Sings. John Cleese, who wrote the lyric, debuted the song in the episode of the radio show I'm Sorry, I'll Read That Again broadcast on 2 February 1969, when it was introduced as "The Ballad of Oliver Cromwell". It is sung to Frédéric Chopin's Heroic Polonaise, and documents the career of British statesman Oliver Cromwell, from his service as Member of Parliament (MP) for Huntingdon to his installation as Lord Protector of the Commonwealth of England. The lead vocals, often heavily multi-tracked, are performed by Cleese, with interjections by Eric Idle.

"Oliver Cromwell" is sung to the first ("A") section of the Polonaise, including the well-known main theme; it does not use the "B" section. The piano introduction is accompanied by a spoken-word introduction, setting a tone of macabre humour ("The most interesting thing about King Charles the First is that he was five foot six inches tall at the start of his reign, but only four foot eight inches tall at the end of it"), as are the subsequent connecting passages. All three instances of the main theme are given a tutti chorus followed by a recounting of the battles and other events of the period; sound effects are added, mostly sounds of battle and of horses. To the interlude is set King Charles I's trial and execution, with rubato adding atmosphere; the only sound effect is implied to be that of Charles's head falling (followed by a solitary giggle from Cromwell).

== Battles, events and personages ==
=== Introduction ===
- Charles I of England, 27 March 1625 (5'6") – 30 January 1649 (4'8")

=== First theme: January 1642 – May 1646 ===
- Oliver Cromwell (1599 – September 1658), Puritan; MP for Huntingdon
- Ironside Cavalry, equipped and trained by Cromwell
- Marston Moor, 1644; Parliamentary victory
- New Model Army, founded by Cromwell
- Naseby, Parliamentary victory (over the "Cavaliers", the Royalist armies)
- Charles I puts himself into the hands of the Scottish Presbyterian army at Southwell

=== Connecting passage: 1647 ===
- John Pym's Solemn League and Covenant; this (1643) agreement between Scottish Covenanters and English Parliamentarians respecting the Presbyterian church in Scotland and (ostensibly) committing England to Presbyterianism was influential in persuading the Scots to deliver Charles I to Parliament (in 1647)

=== Second theme: 1647 – 19 August 1648 ===
- "handed ... over to Oliver Cromwell and his warts" refers to Cromwell's famous instruction to Peter Lely to paint him "warts and all"
- Second Civil War; the Independent leanings of the Army led to conflict with the Presbyterians in Parliament, a disagreement exploited by the Royalist faction
- Battle of Preston (1648), Lancashire; the final battle of the Second Civil war was an overwhelming victory for the Independents ("Roundheads") over the combined Royalist ("Cavaliers") and Presbyterian armies

=== Connecting Passage: 6–20 December 1648 ===
- Pride's Purge; Thomas Pride excluded Presbyterian MPs who refused to abolish the monarchy from the House of Commons, resulting in a Rump Parliament

=== Interlude: 2–30 January 1649 ===
- A High Court of Justice at Westminster Hall indicted Charles I for the crime of tyranny
- Charles refused to accept that the court had jurisdiction over its King, but was nonetheless sentenced to death
- The sentence was carried out by decapitation, 30 January 1649, at the Banqueting House, Whitehall

=== Connecting Passage: 30 January 1649 ===
- The headman failed to utter the customary words, "Behold the head of a traitor!"

=== Third theme: August 1649 – 16 December 1653 ===
- Cromwellian conquest of Ireland
- Commonwealth of England
- Battle of Worcester; the defeat of the Scottish army of Charles II (proclaimed) ended the English Civil War and sank the Royalist cause
- First Anglo-Dutch War, 1653
- Dissolution of the Rump Parliament
- Instrument of Government, drafted by John Lambert, making Cromwell Lord Protector
