= How to Irritate People =

British comedy film

- DVD cfd
- Written by: Tim Brooke-Taylor; Graham Chapman; John Cleese; Marty Feldman
- Directed by: Ian Fordyce
- Starring: John Cleese; Tim Brooke-Taylor; Graham Chapman; Michael Palin; Gillian Lind; Connie Booth; Dick Vosburgh
- Country of origin: United Kingdom
- Original language: English

Production
- Producer: David Frost
- Running time: 68 minutes

Original release
- Network: LWT
- Release: 14 November 1968

How to Irritate People is a 1968 British mockumentary sketch comedy television special recorded in the UK at LWT on 14 November 1968 and written by John Cleese, Graham Chapman, Marty Feldman and Tim Brooke-Taylor. Cleese, Chapman, and Brooke-Taylor also feature in it, along with future Monty Python collaborators Michael Palin and Connie Booth.

In various sketches, Cleese demonstrates exactly what the title suggests—how to irritate people, although this is done in a much more conventional way than the absurdity and surrealism of similar Monty Python sketches.

== Notable sketches ==
=== Pepperpots ===
The recurring characters of the "Pepperpots," old British housewives who annoy theatre-goers and quiz show hosts in these sketches, would go on to be a major part of Monty Python's Flying Circus, appearing in the majority of the show's episodes.

=== Job Interview ===
The "Job Interview" sketch, featuring Cleese as an interviewer who asks several unusual questions of Brooke-Taylor, the interviewee, was later performed, almost unchanged, in the fifth episode of Flying Circus, with Chapman instead playing the interviewee.

=== Freedom of Speech ===
The "Freedom of speech" sketch, starring Cleese as the host/interviewer and Chapman as interviewee Dr. Rhomboid Goatcabin, features a discussion about freedom of speech in Great Britain, in which Cleese's character repeatedly reformulates the subject's main question ("Do you believe there is freedom of speech in this country?") in so many ways as to start a monologue and not let Chapman's character speak. This increasingly annoys the interviewee to the point where he is forced to murder the host to express his opinion on the matter, only to be interrupted again by his spirit. This sketch bears some resemblance to Anne Elk's Theory on Brontosauruses and was originally performed on At Last the 1948 Show, with Marty Feldman having played the interviewee.

=== Indian Restaurant ===
This sketch, featuring Palin as a waiter in an Indian restaurant who is excessively – and somewhat violently – apologetic to his customers whenever anything goes wrong, may very well have laid the groundwork for the "Dirty Fork" sketch from the third Flying Circus episode. In 1980, the Python team recorded an audio version for their Contractual Obligation Album. Although cut from the final album, it featured among the outtakes on their widely bootlegged Hastily Cobbled Together for a Fast Buck album.

=== Car Salesman ===
The "Car Salesman" sketch, in which Palin refuses to accept customer Chapman's claim that a car he sold is faulty, later inspired Python's "Dead Parrot" sketch, in which the malfunctioning car is replaced by an expired parrot.

=== Quiz Show ===
The "Quiz Show" sketch, where Brooke-Taylor, as a Pepperpot, annoys Cleese, a quiz show host, while appearing as a contestant on a show, was later adapted into another Monty Python sketch, "Take Your Pick" (or "Spot the Brain Cell," as it would be later called) in the second Flying Circus series, where Terry Jones plays the contestant attempting to win the prize of a "blow on the head."

=== Airline Pilots ===
The "Airline Pilots" sketch is set in the cockpit of a commercial airliner, with Cleese (as captain) and Chapman (as copilot). The airliner is on autopilot. Bored, they start making reassuring intercom messages to the passengers telling them there is nothing to worry about – at which point, of course, the passengers get worried – aided by the flight attendant (Palin). These messages get continually more incomprehensible or mutually contradictory until eventually, all the passengers bale out. The Monty Python sketch "Bomb on Plane" in episode 35 alluded briefly to this sketch when pilot Michael Palin told passengers, "Our destination is Glasgow; there is no need to panic."

== Release ==
The television special was directed by Ian Fordyce who also directed At Last the 1948 Show, and was made in the UK for the American market in an attempt to introduce them to the new style of British humor. For this reason, the recording is made to the NTSC color standard. The idea for the show came from David Frost.

The television special never aired in the UK but was broadcast in the United States on 21 January 1969 as part of David Frost Presents on KYW-TV. Contemporary reviews suggest a broadcast slot of 60 minutes, including commercials, which would make the version broadcast between 50 and 55 minutes, at least 10 minutes shorter than the current video release. In addition, reviews refer to David Frost as appearing in the show, whereas he is absent from the video version. An audio track confirms that he originally introduced the show. The 1990 UK video release was overseen by Michael Palin, who explained: "I thought it had a few strengths and weaknesses, so we made a few cuts here and there and we put it out".

The show has since appeared on DVD.
