= Anne Elk's Theory on Brontosauruses =

Monty Python sketch

The sketch in 2014

"Anne Elk's Theory on Brontosauruses" is a sketch from Episode 31 of Monty Python's Flying Circus, "The All-England Summarize Proust Competition" (1972).

The sketch features a television presenter (Graham Chapman) interviewing paleontologist Anne Elk (John Cleese in drag). The plot of the sketch is that Miss Elk (who is very concerned about being properly credited: "A. Elk, brackets, Miss, brackets") has severe difficulty presenting her new theory about brontosauruses due to her bizarre mannerisms, which include circumlocution, repetition, and obnoxious, noisy throat-clearing. When she is finally able to state her theory, it turns out to be a very trite observation that "All brontosauruses are thin at one end, much, much thicker in the middle, and then thin again at the far end." In the original broadcast version, the sketch is taken over by other jokes from within the same episode, and spills over into the set of a previous sketch where Miss Elk concludes the episode with a second theory about Marcel Proust.

This sketch was also performed on the album Monty Python's Previous Record, under the title 'Miss Anne Elk'. In this version, before she begins her second theory, the interviewer shoots her.

At Cleese's request, the sketch was performed as part of the team's 2014 live reunion show, Monty Python Live (Mostly), with Eric Idle playing the interviewer. This version concluded with an extended coughing fit, before linking to the "Dancing Teeth" animation.

The sketch inspired the concept of "Elk theories" to describe scientific observations that are not theories but merely minimal accounts.

The character A. Elk and her "Theory of Brontosauruses" is used in the American Psychological Association Style Guide to illustrate how to reference a periodical article in a learned journal.
