= FCC Song =

2004 song by Eric Idle

"FCC Song" is a deliberately controversial and explicit song by British-born Monty Python comic Eric Idle. Idle, who later became a resident of the U.S. state of California, recorded the song in early 2004 in reaction to a fine by the U.S. Federal Communications Commission (FCC) for saying "fuck" on a radio station. The song is also known by its refrain "fuck you very much". Despite being nominally aimed at the FCC, the lyrics primarily target well-known figures associated with the George W. Bush administration, including Dick Cheney and John Ashcroft among others. Idle stated that the song was "dedicated to the FCC and if they broadcast it, it will cost a quarter of a million dollars".

Idle has made the song freely available for download at the Monty Python website. The lyrics' strong anti-Republican stance has prompted numerous anti-Bush websites to link to the song or to mirror it. The word "fuck" occurs 14 times in the song; the words "bitch" and "dickhead" also appear once each.

An earlier song, "I Bet You They Won't Play This Song on the Radio", written and performed by Idle on Monty Python's Contractual Obligation Album (1980), touched on this subject, but with two major differences: it limited its scorn to radio programmers and it bleeped (using various sound effects) the various obscenities. Accordingly, many programmers did indeed play that song on the radio.

== See also ==
- Obscenity
- Decency
- Profanity
- Censorship in the United States
- Freedom of speech in the United States
- First Amendment to the United States Constitution
- Seven dirty words
- "Fuck You" (Lily Allen song)
- "Fuck You" (CeeLo Green song)
