= Vocational Guidance Counsellor =

Monty Python sketch

Vocational Guidance Counsellor is a Monty Python sketch first broadcast on 21 December 1969 in Episode 10.

The sketch is credited with creating the popular stereotype of accountants being boring. Four decades on, the Financial Times reported that it still haunts the profession.

== Plot ==
Herbert Anchovy (Michael Palin) goes to the counsellor (John Cleese) seeking a career change. The counsellor reveals that Anchovy had done an aptitude test, and that the results showed that the career Anchovy is most suited to is chartered accountancy. Anchovy protests that he already is a chartered accountant, and complains that he finds the job dull. The counsellor says that, according to the aptitude test, Anchovy is an extremely dull person; while that would be a drawback in other professions, the counsellor says, it makes him even more suitable for accountancy. Anchovy reveals that his dream is to be a lion tamer, saying that his qualifications for the job are having seen them at the zoo, and having his own lion taming hat. However, it turns out that he has misidentified an anteater as a lion. The counsellor disabuses Anchovy by telling him how fierce lions really are, and shows him a picture of one, which frightens him. Anchovy then comes up with the idea of working his way towards lion taming via banking, but soon reveals that he lacks the courage even for that. As he rambles on, the counsellor delivers a public service announcement to the audience about the dangers of chartered accountancy.

== Re-release ==
The sketch was included in the DVD Monty Python's Flying Circus: Set One—Volume 1, as well as in Monty Python's Flying Circus: Graham Chapman's Personal Best, and also appeared in And Now For Something Completely Different in 1971. In this version the counsellor's description of lions is accompanied by stock footage of a lion charging the camera, which causes Anchovy to recoil in terror. At the end of the film version Eric Idle appears as a fairy to grant Anchovy's wish of seeing his name in lights, whereupon he turns into the host of "Blackmail". In the Monty Python Live (Mostly) stage show at the O2 (which also features a brief stock shot of a lion, on the overhead screen), the sketch ends with Anchovy telling the counsellor he would rather be... a "systems analyst!" (though on a different evening, his choice of career was a "sperm donor!". Other careers were mentioned on other nights at the O2). In fact this was a red herring as in all instances, the audience were expecting Anchovy to say "lumberjack"...then as Palin (as Anchovy) leaps to his feet he announces he wanted to be... "a lumberjack!", at which point he strips off his suit to reveal a lumberjack's outfit, and the sketch segues into The Lumberjack Song.
