= Monty Python's Contractual Obligation Album =

Studio album by Monty Python
- Released: 6 October 1980 (UK); 7 October 1980 (US)
- Recorded: 9 January – 5 May 1980 at Redwood Recording Studios, London
- Genre: Comedy
- Length: 46:23
- Label: Charisma (UK); Arista (US)
- Producer: Eric Idle; Andre Jacquemin

Monty Python chronology
Monty Python's Life of Brian (1979)	Monty Python's Contractual Obligation Album (1980)	Monty Python's The Meaning of Life (1983)

Professional ratings
Review scores
Source	Rating
Allmusic	3/5 stars
Billboard	(unrated)

Monty Python's Contractual Obligation Album is the final studio album by Monty Python, released in 1980. As the title suggests, the album was put together to complete a contract with Charisma Records. Besides newly written songs and sketches, the sessions saw re-recordings of material that dated back to the 1960s pre-Python shows I'm Sorry, I'll Read That Again, The Frost Report, At Last The 1948 Show and How To Irritate People. One track, "Bells", dates from the sessions for Monty Python's Previous Record, while further material was adapted from Eric Idle's post-Python series Rutland Weekend Television. The group also reworked material written but discarded from early drafts of Life Of Brian, as well as the initial scripts for what would eventually become The Meaning Of Life.

== Background ==
The group had not recorded an all-studio album since Matching Tie and Handkerchief in 1973 and were initially unenthusiastic about returning to the recording studio. Fresh from co-producing the Life Of Brian soundtrack album, Eric Idle oversaw the sessions which resulted in over half the album consisting of songs. Beginning in January 1980, the group recorded reams of unused material during the sessions, much of which found its way on to the unreleased outtakes album Hastily Cobbled Together For A Fast Buck, although some previously unheard material was included on the compilations The Final Rip Off (1987) and Monty Python Sings (1989). In 2006, further unreleased tracks were added to the special edition CDs of Another Monty Python Record, Monty Python's Previous Record, Matching Tie and Handkerchief and the Contractual Obligation album itself. In 2014, three further tracks were added to the expanded Monty Python Sings (Again).

Due to the amount of cut material, the finished album features John Cleese on only three tracks (the reworkings of "String" and "Bookshop", plus a brief appearance at the start of "Medical Love Song") while Terry Gilliam does not feature at all. Gilliam's absence was noted on the album's Basil Pao-designed cover, which featured a plain inner sleeve on which Eric Idle wrote "Can T.G. do a nice-eye catching cover to help it sell?", to which Terry Jones replies "Not really worth it". The record label shown on the cover has a fake track-listing, with titles relating to the legal status of the contractual obligation. As with the Drury Lane album, the cover appears in a scene in Gilliam's 2005 film Tideland, although it is only visible in the 2.35:1 aspect ratio version.

== Release ==
The actual record label of the original UK vinyl release had the standard Charisma design made up to look like parts had been torn off, onto which the first side had "Side one" scribbled on in pen, with "The other side" written on Side 2. The traditional George Peckham runout groove messages read "EXCUSE THE PAUSE BETWEEN SIDES, WE'VE JUST NIPPED OUT TO THE PUB FOR A PINT" on Side 1 and "DEAR MUM PLEASE SEND ANOTHER CUPPA DOWN, STILL CUTTING THE PYTHON L.P. LOVE PORKY X" on Side 2.

A 3 track 7" single (CB 374) comprising "I Like Chinese"/"I Bet You They Won't Play This Song on the Radio"/"Finland" was released in the UK on 3 October 1980 to tie-in with the album.

Michael Palin appeared on the BBC's Top of the Pops to promote the album, helping to give the group their highest chart position, peaking at No. 13 on the UK Albums Chart.

The 2006 special edition contains four bonus tracks consisting of contemporary promotional material and demo versions of two songs.

== Controversies ==
Two tracks on the album caused controversy when first released.

The lead track, "Sit on My Face" was sung to the tune of "Sing as We Go", a song made famous by Gracie Fields, and reportedly its inclusion led to legal threats against the Python team for copyright infringement over the melody. Nonetheless, the song was retained on the album and had already been lip-synched by Graham Chapman, John Cleese, Terry Gilliam and Terry Jones as the opening of the second half of Monty Python Live at the Hollywood Bowl, shortly before the album's release (the song opens the heavily edited 1982 film version). The concert film also features Terry Jones twice miming to "Never Be Rude to an Arab". In 2014, "Sit on My Face" was featured in the 2014 Monty Python performance reunion concert series, Monty Python Live (Mostly), expanded into a production number.

"Farewell to John Denver", which contained a few bars of The Rutles member Ollie Halsall impersonating John Denver singing a parody of "Annie's Song", followed by the sound of the singer being strangled, was removed from subsequent pressings of the UK version on legal advice (reports differ as to whether it had to do with the licensing of "Annie's Song" or the depiction of the popular singer being murdered), and was replaced by an apology spoken by Terry Jones. Later CD releases of the album reinstated the John Denver track, but after Denver's death in a plane crash, the 2006 reissue reduced the main track listing (not counting the bonus tracks) to 23 from its original 24, therefore omitting both the original track and the apology one (the original "Farewell to John Denver" track can be found on the Arista CD The Monty Python Instant Record Collection). Original advance print advertising by Charisma Records included the tagline, "Now a Major Lawsuit".

== Other versions ==
As noted above, some pressings of Contractual Obligation Album omit the "Farewell to John Denver" track. The original U.K. vinyl pressing also contained an unintentionally out-of-sync mix on the song "I'm So Worried", which was subsequently corrected.

The original cassette version had an additional track due to Side 1 being several minutes shorter than side 2. At the end of Side 1 (about 0:45 after "I'm So Worried"), Michael Palin states that there will be a "tiresome gap" before the tape ends. Several minutes (about 4:52) of silence ensue, followed at the very end by Eric Idle stating that the gap was over and the tape may be turned to Side 2. The amended UK cassette release (with the John Denver section removed and "I'm So Worried" fixed) features an alternative message from Terry Jones at the end in place of the Michael Palin and Eric Idle messages.

Two tracks on the album were later released in expanded versions. "Henry Kissinger" featured an extra verse when it was included on the 1987 The Final Rip Off double compilation album, while the version of "Medical Love Song" on the 1989 Monty Python Sings compilation contains additional verses and a new arrangement by John Du Prez.

Ronnie Barker and Ronnie Corbett performed the original version of "String" on 27 April 1967 in The Frost Report episode "The Frost Report on Advertising". The original version of "Bookshop" from the 1 March 1967 episode of At Last the 1948 Show had John Cleese as the bookseller and Marty Feldman as the customer (the latter played by Graham Chapman on the Contractual Obligation version). Cleese had already resurrected the sketch on 8 May 1977 for the second Amnesty benefit concert An Evening Without Sir Bernard Miles (later re-titled as The Mermaid Frolics for TV broadcast and vinyl release), where Connie Booth played the customer against Cleese's bookseller. When Graham Chapman guested on NBC's variety show The Big Show in 1980, the 18 March edition featured a performance of the sketch, this time with Chapman switching roles as the bookseller playing against Joe Baker as the customer.

Some material had previously been published in written form. The Eric Idle monologue "Rock Notes" originally appeared as part of the "Rutland Stone" section in the 1976 Rutland Weekend Television spin-off book, The Rutland Dirty Weekend Book. "Martyrdom of St. Victor" (originally "St. Brian") and the "All Things Dull and Ugly" lyrics were lifted from 1979's MONTYPYTHONSCRAPBOOK.

Two bands drew their name from "Toad the Wet Sprocket", an imaginary group featured in "Rock Notes". The name had originally been featured in a parody of The Old Grey Whistle Test in episode 4 of the first series of Rutland Weekend Television in 1975. The first Toad the Wet Sprocket was a British heavy metal band of the 1970s, which released a few singles and appeared on the 1980 compilation album Metal for Muthas. The second Toad the Wet Sprocket is a longer-lived American alternative band popular in 1990s and still extant, having reformed after breaking up, as of December 2025.

== Track listing ==
=== Side one ===
1. Sit on My Face
2. Announcement
3. Henry Kissinger
4. String
5. Never Be Rude to an Arab
6. I Like Chinese
7. Bishop
8. Medical Love Song
9. Farewell to John Denver (omitted on some releases and replaced by an Apology by Terry Jones)
10. Finland
11. I'm So Worried
12. End of Side 1 Announcement (cassette version only)

=== The other side ===
1. I Bet You They Won't Play This Song on the Radio
2. Martyrdom of St. Victor
3. Here Comes Another One
4. Bookshop
5. Do What John?
6. Rock Notes
7. Muddy Knees
8. Crocodile
9. Decomposing Composers
10. Bells
11. Traffic Lights
12. All Things Dull and Ugly
13. A Scottish Farewell

=== 2006 bonus tracks ===
- Contractual Obligation – Terry Jones and Graham Chapman Promotional Interview
- Radio Ad Obligation Promo
- Medical Love Song [Alternate Demo Version]
- I'm So Worried [Demo Version]

== Charts ==
Chart (1980/81)	Peak position
Australia (Kent Music Report)	3
United Kingdom (Official Charts Company)	13

== Certifications ==
Region	Certification	Certified units/sales
Australia (ARIA)	Platinum	50,000^{^}
^{^} Shipments figures based on certification alone.

== Personnel ==
- Graham Chapman
- John Cleese
- Eric Idle
- Terry Jones
- Michael Palin

=== Additional performers ===
- Mike Berry (singing voice on "Here Comes Another One")
- The Fred Tomlinson Singers
- Brian Willoughby Guitar on "Finland"
- Ollie Halsall (John Denver impersonation on "Farewell to John Denver")

=== Production ===
- Eric Idle – producer
- André Jacquemin – assistant producer and chief engineer
- Rob Briancourt – assistant engineer
- John Du Prez [credited under his real name, Trevor Jones] – musical production and arrangements
- Basil Pao – sleeve design
- Fred Tomlinson – musical director of backing vocals
- Kevin Hodge – mastering engineer

Jim Beach is credited as "the lawyer the Pythons wronged"

== Music credits ==
The following is the list of musical works included on the album. They comprise, for the most part, self-penned Python songs plus two pieces of library music from Ready Music Ltd.

1. Sit on My Face (Eric Idle and Harry Parr-Davies)
2. Henry Kissinger (Eric Idle)
3. Never Be Rude to an Arab (Terry Jones)
4. I Like Chinese (Eric Idle)
5. Polygon (Val Podlarsinski)
6. Medical Love Song (Graham Chapman, Eric Idle and John Du Prez)
7. Farewell to John Denver (Graham Chapman, Eric Idle and John Denver)
8. Finland (Michael Palin)
9. I'm So Worried (Terry Jones)
10. I Bet You They Won't Play This Song on the Radio (Eric Idle)
11. Here Comes Another One (Terry Jones)
12. Do What John? (Eric Idle)
13. Muddy Knees (Terry Jones)
14. Sportstrack (John Du Prez)
15. Decomposing Composers (Michael Palin)
16. Traffic Lights (Terry Jones)
17. All Things Dull and Ugly (Eric Idle and William Henry Monk)
18. A Scottish Farewell (Terry Jones)

== Accolades ==
Grammy Awards

Year	Award	Result
1981	Best Comedy Album	Nominated
