= Medical Love Song =

Song performed by Monty Python

"Medical Love Song" is a Monty Python comedy song composed by Eric Idle and John Du Prez, with lyrics co-written by Graham Chapman. It appeared on Monty Python's Contractual Obligation Album from 1980, and is also included on the CD Monty Python Sings.

The song consists of a long list of sexually transmitted diseases contracted during a "lovely night in June" and their unpleasant effects on the body, using medical terminology provided by Graham Chapman, who was a qualified doctor.

The song was included as an animated number in A Liar's Autobiography, during the end credits.
