= I Bet You They Won't Play This Song on the Radio =

1980 song performed by Eric Idle

"I Bet You They Won't Play This Song on the Radio" is a song performed by Eric Idle, an English comedian and member of Monty Python. It mocks radio censorship of words considered inappropriate. Another similar song, also by Idle, is "The FCC Song", whose refrain "Fuck you very much" is directed at the U.S. Federal Communications Commission. "I Bet You They Won't Play This Song on the Radio" touches on the same subject, but includes bleepings and comic sound-effect noises (such as "Cha-ching" or "Yeeaagh!") in place of actual profanity.

The song first appeared on Monty Python's Contractual Obligation Album, and later appeared on two compilation albums: disc two of The Final Rip Off and the E.P. Always Look on the Bright Side of Life.

== See also ==
- FCC Song
