= Sit on My Face =

1980 song by Monty Python

"Sit on My Face" is a short song written by Eric Idle and performed by the members of the comedy troupe Monty Python, which originally appeared on the album Monty Python's Contractual Obligation Album and later appeared on the compilation Monty Python Sings. The song's lyrics are sung to the melody of "Sing As We Go" (1934) by Harry Parr-Davies, made popular by Gracie Fields. The opening gives way to the voices of The Fred Tomlinson Singers singing "Sit on my face and tell me that you love me." The remaining lyrics contain numerous references to fellatio and cunnilingus, such as "when I'm between your thighs you blow me away" and "life can be fine if we both 69".

The song opened the 1982 film Monty Python Live at the Hollywood Bowl, where it was lip-synched by Graham Chapman, John Cleese, Terry Gilliam and Terry Jones dressed as waiters in a performance which, at the suggestion of Python touring member Neil Innes, ended with them revealing their bare backsides. In 2002, a similar rendition was mimed by Eric Idle, Terry Jones, Terry Gilliam and Neil Innes at the Concert for George, a memorial concert for George Harrison which took place at the Royal Albert Hall. At the end of this rendition the four men turned their backs to face a portrait of George Harrison, thereby revealing their naked buttocks and effectively mooning the Albert Hall audience. In 2012 it was featured as an animated number in A Liar's Autobiography, performed by the London Gay Men's Chorus, both on the recorded soundtrack and live, as a flash mob, during the screening shown during the London Film Festival. The song also opened the second half of Monty Python's 2014 reunion shows where it accompanied a suggestive dance routine by the 20-strong dance ensemble, with Eric Idle and Michael Palin encouraging an audience singalong.

== Legal issues ==
The owners of "Sing as We Go" threatened to sue Monty Python for copyright infringement, but the Pythons released the song anyway.

The US Federal Communications Commission (FCC) has ruled that the song is actionably indecent, concluding that "despite English accent and 'ambient noise' ... the lyrics were sufficiently understandable". In 1992, it fined KGB-FM, a San Diego, California classic rock radio station, US$9,200 for playing the song.

== French adaptation ==
A French language rendition of the song presented in Edinburgh in 2003 translated the title as "Cum in My Mouth". According to producer Rémy Renoux, "Cum in My Mouth is … what Monty Python would have written today." Renoux also pointed out that a literal translation into French would not fit the melody of the song, and claimed that the translation met with the approval of the Monty Python team.

== See also ==
- Censorship of broadcasting in the United States
- Censorship of music
