= Monty Python's Flying Circus =

British sketch comedy television series (1969–1974)

- Genre: Sketch comedy; Surreal humour; Satire; Black comedy
- Created by: Graham Chapman; John Cleese; Eric Idle; Terry Jones; Michael Palin; Terry Gilliam
- Written by: Monty Python; Neil Innes; Douglas Adams
- Directed by: Ian MacNaughton; John Howard Davies
- Starring: Graham Chapman; John Cleese (series 1–3); Eric Idle; Terry Jones; Michael Palin; Terry Gilliam; Carol Cleveland
- Theme music composer: John Philip Sousa
- Opening theme: "The Liberty Bell" recorded by Band of the Grenadier Guards
- Composers: Neil Innes; Fred Tomlinson Singers
- Country of origin: United Kingdom
- No. of series: 4
- No. of episodes: 45 (list of episodes)

Production
- Producers: John Howard Davies (series 1); Ian MacNaughton
- Cinematography: James Balfour; Alan Featherstone
- Animator: Terry Gilliam
- Editors: Ray Millichope; Robert C. Dearberg
- Running time: approx. 26–32 minutes
- Production company: BBC

Original release
- Network: BBC1
- Release: 5 October 1969 – 18 January 1973
- Network: BBC2
- Release: 31 October – 5 December 1974

Related
- Monty Python's Fliegender Zirkus; And Now for Something Completely Different

Monty Python's Flying Circus (also known as simply Monty Python) is a British surreal sketch comedy series created by and starring Graham Chapman, John Cleese, Eric Idle, Terry Jones, Michael Palin, and Terry Gilliam, who became known collectively as "Monty Python", or the "Pythons". The first episode was recorded at the BBC on 7 September 1969 and premiered on 5 October on BBC1, with 45 episodes airing over four series from 1969 to 1974, plus two episodes for German TV. A feature film adaptation of several sketches, And Now for Something Completely Different, was released in 1971.

The series stands out for its use of absurd situations, mixed with risqué and innuendo-laden humour, sight gags, and observational sketches without punchlines. Live-action segments were broken up with animations by Gilliam, often merging with the live action to form segues. The overall format used for the series followed and elaborated upon the style used by Spike Milligan in his groundbreaking series Q..., rather than the traditional sketch show format. The Pythons play the majority of the series's characters, along with supporting cast members including Carol Cleveland (referred to by the team as the unofficial "Seventh Python"), Connie Booth (Cleese's first wife), series producer Ian MacNaughton, Ian Davidson, musician Neil Innes, and Fred Tomlinson and the Fred Tomlinson Singers for musical numbers.

The programme came about as the six Pythons, having met each other through university and in various radio and television programmes in the 1960s, sought to make a new sketch comedy show unlike anything else on British television. Much of the humour in the series targeted the idiosyncrasies of British life, especially that of professionals, as well as aspects of politics. Their comedy is often pointedly intellectual, with numerous erudite references to philosophers and literary figures and their works. The team intended their humour to be impossible to categorise, and succeeded so completely that the adjective "Pythonesque" was invented to define it and, later, similar material. Their humour was not always seen as appropriate for television by the BBC, leading to some censorship during the third series. Cleese left the show following that series, and the remaining Pythons completed a final, shortened fourth series before ending the show.

The show became very popular in the United Kingdom, and after initially failing to draw an audience in the United States, gained American popularity after PBS member stations began airing it in 1974. The programme's success on both sides of the Atlantic led to the Pythons going on live tours and creating three additional films, while the individual Pythons flourished in solo careers. Monty Python's Flying Circus has become an influential work on comedy as well as in popular culture. The programming language Python was named by Guido van Rossum after the show, and the word spam, for junk email, took its name from a word used in a Monty Python sketch.

== Premise ==
Monty Python's Flying Circus is a sketch comedy show, though it does not adhere to any regular format. The sketches include live-action skits performed by Graham Chapman, John Cleese, Eric Idle, Terry Jones, Michael Palin, and Terry Gilliam, along with animations created by Gilliam, frequently used as linking devices or interstitial between skits. During the first three series, Cleese would be dressed in a dinner jacket and introduce the show with the phrase "And Now for Something Completely Different". Afterwards, a long-haired man (called the It's man) played by Michael Palin would run all the way to the camera and say "It's.." which would start the show proper. The show's introductory theme, which varied with each series, was also based on Gilliam's animations and was accompanied by a rendition of The Liberty Bell march by John Philip Sousa, as performed by the Band of the Grenadier Guards. The march was first published in 1893; Gilliam chose it as the show's theme because it had fallen into the public domain under the terms of the Berne Convention and United States copyright law, and could thus be used without royalty payments.

=== Title ===
The title Monty Python's Flying Circus was partly the result of the group's reputation at the BBC. Michael Mills, the BBC's Head of Comedy, wanted their name to include the word "circus" because the BBC referred to the six members wandering around the building as a circus, in particular, "Baron Von Took's Circus", after Barry Took, who had brought them to the BBC. The group added "flying" to make it sound less like an actual circus and more like something from World War I. The group was coming up with their name at a time when the 1966 The Royal Guardsmen song Snoopy vs. the Red Baron had been at a peak. Freiherr Manfred von Richthofen, the World War I German flying ace known as The Red Baron, commanded the Jagdgeschwader 1 fighter squadron known as "The Flying Circus".

The words "Monty Python" were added because they claimed it sounded like a really bad theatrical agent, the sort of person who would have brought them together, with John Cleese suggesting "Python" as something slimy and slithery, and Eric Idle suggesting "Monty". They later explained that the name Monty "made us laugh because Monty to us means Lord Montgomery, our great general of the Second World War". The BBC had rejected some other names put forward by the group, including Whither Canada?; The Nose Show; Ow! It's Colin Plint!; A Horse, a Spoon and a Basin; The Toad Elevating Moment and Owl Stretching Time. Several of these titles were later used for individual episodes.

=== Recurring characters ===
Compared with many other sketch comedy shows, Flying Circus had fewer recurring characters, many of whom were involved only in titles and linking sequences. Continuity for many of these recurring characters was frequently non-existent from sketch to sketch, with sometimes even the most basic information (such as a character's name) being changed from one appearance to the next.

The most frequently returning characters on the show include:

- The "It's" Man (Palin), a Robinson Crusoe-type castaway with torn clothes and a long, unkempt beard who would appear at the beginning of the programme. Often he is seen performing a long or dangerous task, such as falling off a tall, jagged cliff or running through a mine field a long distance towards the camera before introducing the show by just saying, "It's..." before being abruptly cut off by the opening titles and Terry Gilliam's animation sprouting the words 'Monty Python's Flying Circus'. It's was an early candidate for the title of the series.
- A BBC continuity announcer in a dinner jacket (Cleese), seated at a desk, often in highly incongruous locations, such as a forest or a beach. His line, "And now for something completely different", was used variously as a lead-in to the opening titles and a simple way to link sketches. Though Cleese is best known for it, Idle first introduced the phrase in Episode 2, where he introduced a man with three buttocks. It eventually became the show's catchphrase and served as the title for the troupe's first movie. In Series 3 the line was shortened to simply: "And now..." and was often combined with the "It's" man in introducing the episodes.
- The Gumbys, a dim-witted group of identically attired people all wearing gumboots (from which they take their name), high-water trousers, braces, Fair Isle tank tops, white shirts with rolled up sleeves, round wire-rimmed glasses, toothbrush moustaches and knotted handkerchiefs worn on their heads (a stereotype of the English working-class holidaymaker). Gumbys always stand in a hunched, square posture, holding their arms stiffly at their sides with their balled hands curled inwards. They speak slowly in loud, throaty voices punctuated by frequent grunts and groans, display a poor understanding of everything they encounter, and have a fondness for pointless violence. All of them are surnamed Gumby: D.P. Gumby, R.S. Gumby, etc. Even though all Pythons played Gumbys in the show's run, the character is most closely associated with Michael Palin.
- The Knight with a Raw Chicken (Gilliam), who would hit characters over the head with the chicken when they said something particularly silly. The knight was a regular during the first series and made another appearance in the third.
- A nude organist (played in his first two appearances by Gilliam, later by Jones) who provided a brief fanfare to punctuate certain sketches, most notably on a sketch poking fun at Sale of the Century or as yet another way to introduce the opening titles. This character was addressed as "Onan" by Palin's host character in the ersatz game show sketch "Blackmail". He wore only a tie and a white shirt collar.
- The "Pepper Pots" are screeching middle-aged, lower-middle class housewives, played by the Pythons in frocks and frumpy hats, and engage in surreal and inconsequential conversation. "The Pepper Pots" was the in-house name that the Pythons used to identify these characters, who were never identified as such on-screen. On the rare occasion these women were named, it was often for comic effect, featuring such names as Mrs. Scum, Mrs. Non-Gorilla, Mrs. Thing, Mrs. Entity, or the duo Mrs. Premise and Mrs. Conclusion. "Pepper pot" refers to what the Pythons believed was the typical body shape of middle-class, British housewives, as explained by John Cleese in How to Irritate People. Terry Jones is perhaps most closely associated with the Pepper Pots, but all the Pythons were frequent in performing the drag characters.
- Brief black-and-white stock footage, lasting only two or three seconds, of middle-aged women sitting in an audience and applauding. The film was taken from a Women's Institute meeting and was sometimes presented with a colour tint.

Other recurring characters include:

- "The Colonel" (Chapman), a British Army officer who interrupts sketches that are "too silly" or that contain material he finds offensive. The Colonel also appears when non-BBC broadcast repeats need to be cut off for time constraints in syndication.
- Arthur Pewtey (Palin), a socially inept, extremely dull man who appears most notably in the "Marriage Guidance Counsellor" and "Ministry of Silly Walks" sketches. His sketches all take the form of an office appointment with an authority figure (usually played by Cleese), which are used to parody the officious side of the British establishment by having the professional employed in the most bizarre field of expertise. The spelling of Pewtey's surname is changed, sometimes being spelled "Putey".
- The Reverend Arthur Belling is the vicar of St Loony-Up-The-Cream-Bun-and-Jam, known for his deranged behaviour. In one sketch (within Series 2, played by Chapman), he makes an appeal to the insane people of the world to drive sane people insane. In another sketch (within Series 3, played by Palin), which is among the pantheon of fan favourites, the vicar politely joins a honeymooning couple at an outdoor café, repeatedly insisting he does not wish to disturb them; he then sits down, opens a suitcase full of props, and calmly proceeds to smash plates on the table, shake a baby doll in their faces, bounce a rubber crab from a ping-pong paddle, and spray shaving cream all over his face, all whilst loudly chanting nonsense syllables. Rev. Belling's odd version of 'not being disturbing' serves to convert the couple to his bizarre sect of Christianity.
- A somewhat disreputable shopkeeper, played by Palin, is a staple of many a two-person sketch (notably "Dead Parrot Sketch" and "Cheese Shop"). He often speaks with a strong Cockney accent, and has no consistent name.
- Mr. Badger (Idle), a Scotsman whose specialty was interrupting sketches ('I won't ruin your sketch, for a pound'). He was once interviewed, in a sketch opposite Cleese, regarding his interpretation of Magna Carta, which Badger believes was actually a piece of chewing gum on a bedspread in Dorset. He has also been seen as an aeroplane hijacker whose demands grow increasingly strange.
- Mr. Eric Praline, a disgruntled man, played by Cleese and who often wears a Pac-a-Mac. His most famous appearance is in the "Dead Parrot sketch". His name is only mentioned once on-screen, during the "Fish Licence" sketch, but his attire (together with Cleese's distinctive, nasal performance) distinguishes him as a recognisable character who makes multiple appearances throughout the first two series. An audio re-recording of "Fish Licence" also reveals that he has multiple pets of wildly differing species, all of them named "Eric".
- Arthur Nudge, a well-dressed mustachioed man, referred to in the published scripts as "Mr. Nudge" (Idle), who pointedly annoys uptight characters (usually Jones). He is characterised by his constant nudging gestures and cheeky innuendo. His most famous appearance is in his initial sketch, "Nudge Nudge", though he appears in several later sketches too, including "The Visitors", where he claimed his name was Arthur Name.
- Biggles (Chapman, and in one instance Jones), a World War I pilot. Derived from the famous series of fiction stories by W. E. Johns.
- Luigi Vercotti (Palin), a mafioso entrepreneur and pimp featured during the first series, accompanied in his first appearance by his brother Dino (Jones). He appears as the manager for Ron Obvious, as the owner of La Gondola restaurant and as a victim of the Piranha Brothers. With his brother, he attempts to talk the Colonel into paying for protection of his Army base.
- The Spanish Inquisition would burst into a previously unrelated sketch whenever their name was mentioned. Their catchphrase was 'Nobody expects the Spanish Inquisition!' They consist of Cardinal Ximinez (Palin), Cardinal Fang (Gilliam), and Cardinal Biggles (Jones). They premiered in series two and Ximinez had a cameo in "The Buzz Aldrin Show".
- Frenchmen: Cleese and Palin would sometimes dress in stereotypical French garb, e.g. striped shirt, tight pants, beret, and speak in garbled French, with incomprehensible accents. They had one fake moustache between them, and each would stick it onto the other's lip when it was his turn to speak. They appear giving a demonstration of the technical aspects of the flying sheep in episode 2 ("Sex and Violence"), and appear in the Ministry of Silly Walks sketch as the developers of "La Marche Futile". They also make an appearance in Monty Python and the Holy Grail.
- The Compère (Palin), a sleazy nightclub emcee in a red jacket. He linked sketches by introducing them as nightclub acts, and was occasionally seen after the sketch, passing comment on it. In one link, he was the victim of the Knight with a Raw Chicken.
- Spiny Norman, a Gilliam animation of a giant hedgehog. He is introduced in Episode 1 of Series 2 in "Piranha Brothers" as an hallucination experienced by Dinsdale Piranha when he is depressed. Later, Spiny Norman appears randomly in the background of animated cityscapes, shouting 'Dinsdale!'
- Cardinal Richelieu (Palin) is impersonated by someone or is impersonating someone else. He is first seen as a witness in court, but he turns out to be Ron Higgins, a professional Cardinal Richelieu impersonator. He is later seen during the "Historical Impersonations" sketch as himself impersonating Petula Clark.
- Ken Shabby (Palin), an unkempt, disgusting man who cleaned public lavatories, appeared in his own sketch in the first series, attempting to get approval from another man (Chapman) to marry his daughter (Booth). In the second series, he appeared in several vox populi segments. He later founded his own religion (as part of the "Crackpot Religions" sketch) and called himself Archbishop Shabby.
- Raymond Luxury-Yacht (Chapman) is described as one of Britain's leading skin specialists. He wears an enormous fake nose made of polystyrene. He proudly proclaims that his name "is spelled 'Raymond Luxury-Yach-t', but it is pronounced 'Throat-Wobbler Mangrove'".
- A Madman (Chapman) Often appears in vox pops segments. He wears a bowler hat and has a bushy moustache. He will always rant and ramble about his life whenever he appears and will occasionally foam at the mouth and fall over backwards. He appears in "The Naked Ant", "The Buzz Aldrin Show" and "It's a Living".

Other returning characters include a married couple, often mentioned but never seen, Ann Haydon-Jones and her husband Pip. In "Election Night Special", Pip has lost a political seat to Engelbert Humperdinck. Several recurring characters are played by different Pythons. Both Palin and Chapman played the insanely violent Police Constable Pan Am. Both Jones and Palin portrayed police sergeant Harry 'Snapper' Organs of Q division. Various historical figures were played by a different cast member in each appearance, such as Mozart (Cleese, then Palin), or Queen Victoria (Jones, then Palin, then all five Pythons in Series 4).

Some of the Pythons' real-life targets recurred more frequently than others. Reginald Maudling, a contemporary Conservative politician, was singled out for perhaps the most consistent ridicule. Then-Secretary of State for Education and Science, and (well after the programme had ended) Prime Minister Margaret Thatcher, was occasionally mentioned (a reference to Thatcher's brain being in her shin in particular having been well received from the studio audience). Then-US President Richard Nixon was also frequently mocked, as was Conservative party leader Edward Heath, prime minister for much of the series' run. The British police were also a favourite target, often acting bizarrely, stupidly, or abusing their authority, frequently in drag.

== Series overview ==
There were a total of 45 episodes of Monty Python's Flying Circus made across four series.

Series	Episodes	Originally released	
Series	Episodes	First released	Last released
1	13	5 October 1969	11 January 1970
2	13	15 September 1970	22 December 1970
3	13	19 October 1972	18 January 1973
Specials	2	3 January 1972	18 December 1972
4	6	31 October 1974	5 December 1974

=== Monty Python's Fliegender Zirkus ===
Two episodes were produced in German for WDR (Westdeutscher Rundfunk), both titled Monty Python's Fliegender Zirkus, the literal German translation of the English title. While visiting the UK in the early 1970s, German entertainer and TV producer Alfred Biolek caught notice of the Pythons. Excited by their innovative, absurd sketches, he invited them to Germany in 1971 and 1972 to write and act in two special German episodes.

The first episode, advertised as Monty Python's Fliegender Zirkus: Blödeln für Deutschland ("Monty Python's Flying Circus: Clowning Around for Germany"), was produced in 1971 and performed in German. The second episode, advertised as Monty Python's Fliegender Zirkus: Blödeln auf die feine englische Art ("Monty Python's Flying Circus: Clowning Around in the Distinguished English Way"), produced in 1972, was recorded in English and dubbed into German for its broadcast in Germany. The original English recording was transmitted by the BBC in October 1973.

== Development ==
Prior to the show, the six main cast members had met each other as part of various comedy shows: Jones and Palin were members of The Oxford Revue, while Chapman, Cleese, and Idle were members of Cambridge University's Footlights, and while on tour in the United States, met Gilliam. In various capacities, the six worked on a number of different British radio and television comedy shows from 1964 to 1969 as both writers and on-screen roles. The six began to collaborate on ideas together, blending elements of their previous shows, to devise the premise of a new comedy show which presented a number of skits with minimal common elements, as if it were comedy presented by a stream of consciousness. This was aided through the use of Gilliam's animations to help transition skits from one to the next.

== Casting ==
Although there were few recurring characters, and the six cast members played many diverse roles, each perfected some character traits.

=== Chapman ===
Graham Chapman often portrayed straight-laced men, of any age or class, frequently authority figures such as military officers, policemen or doctors. His characters could, at any moment, engage in "Pythonesque" maniacal behaviour and then return to their former sobriety. He was also skilled in abuse, which he brusquely delivered in such sketches as "Argument Clinic" and "Flying Lessons". Conversely, Chapman could easily adopt a dignified "straight man" demeanour as seen in the Python feature films Holy Grail (King Arthur) and Life of Brian (the title character).

=== Cleese ===
John Cleese played numerous authority figures, either ridiculous or besieged by insanity. Gilliam claims that Cleese is the funniest of the Pythons in drag, as he barely needs to be dressed up to look hilarious, with his square chin and 6' 5" (196 cm) frame (see the "Mr. and Mrs. Git" sketch). Cleese also played intimidating maniacs, such as an instructor in the "Self-Defence Against Fresh Fruit" sketch. His character Mr. Praline, the put-upon consumer, featured in some of the most popular sketches, most famously in "Dead Parrot". One star turn that proved most memorable among Python fans was "The Ministry of Silly Walks", where he worked for the eponymous government department. The sketch displays the notably tall and loose-limbed Cleese's physicality in a variety of silly walks. Despite its popularity, particularly among American fans, Cleese himself particularly disliked the sketch, feeling that many of the laughs it generated were cheap and that no balance was provided by what could have been the true satirical centrepoint. Another of his trademarks is his over-the-top delivery of abuse, particularly his screaming "You bastard!"

Cleese often played foreigners with ridiculous accents, especially Frenchmen, most of the time with Palin. Sometimes this extended to the use of actual French or German (such as "The Funniest Joke in the World", "Mr. Hilter", or "La Marche Futile" at the end of "The Ministry of Silly Walks"), but still with a very heavy accent (or impossible to understand, as for example Hilter's speech).

=== Gilliam ===
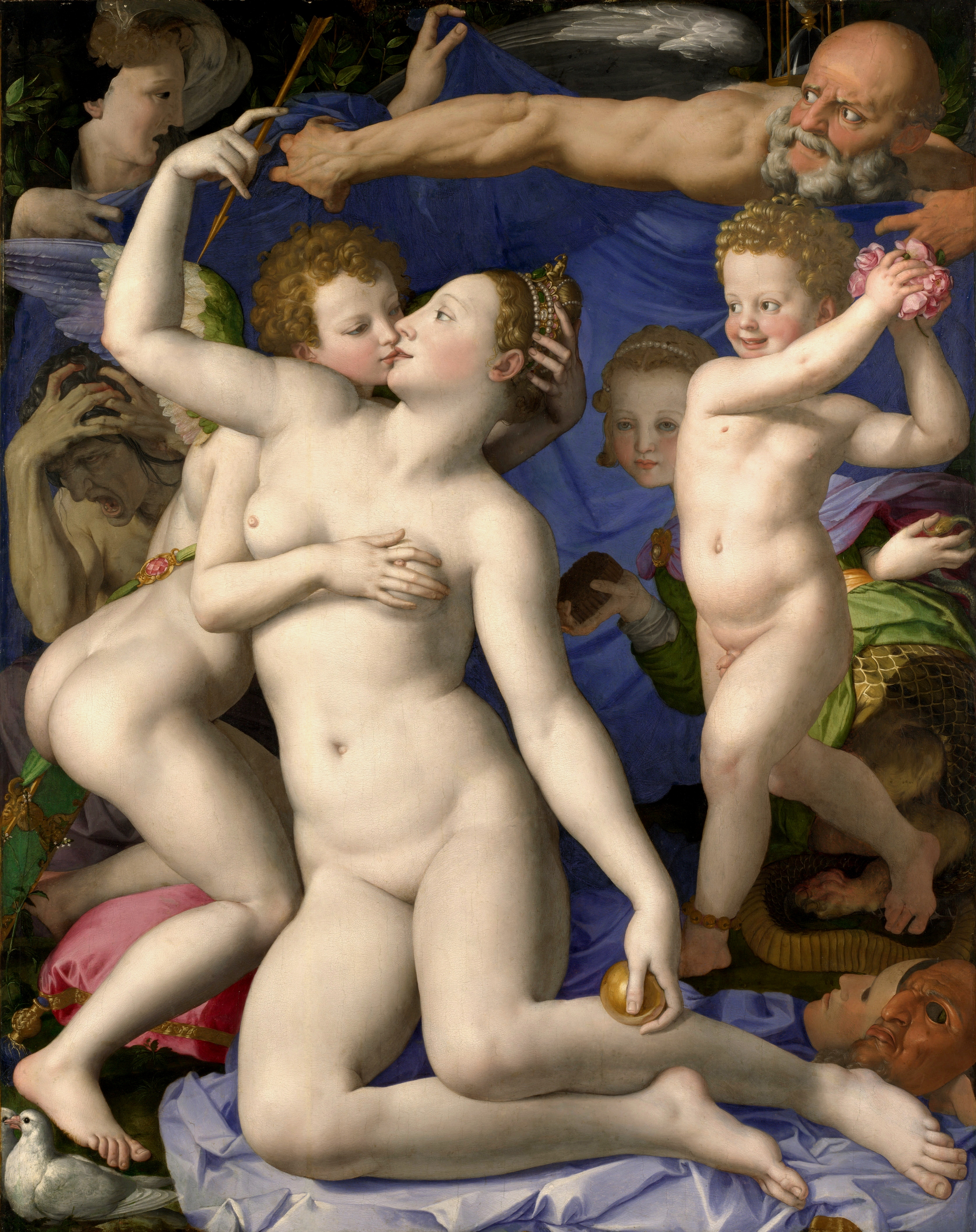
The famous Python Foot can here be seen in its original context in the bottom-left corner of Venus, Cupid, Folly and Time by Agnolo Bronzino, in the National Gallery, London.

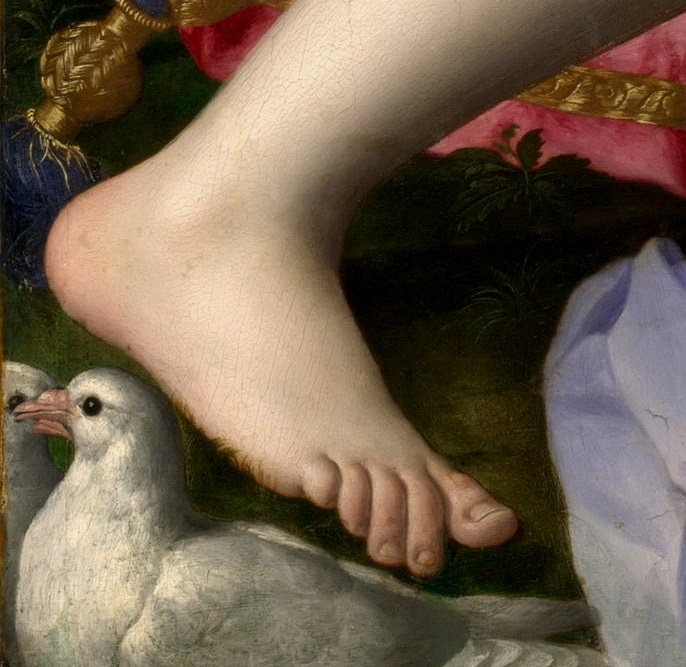
Close-up of the foot

Many Python sketches were linked together by the cut-out animations of Terry Gilliam, including the opening titles featuring the iconic giant foot that became a symbol of all that was 'Pythonesque'. Gilliam's unique visual style was characterised by sudden, dramatic movements and deliberate mismatches of scale, set in surrealist landscapes populated by engravings of large buildings with elaborate architecture, grotesque Victorian gadgets, machinery, and people cut from old Sears Roebuck catalogues. Gilliam added airbrush illustrations and many familiar pieces of art. All of these elements were combined in incongruous ways to obtain new and humorous meanings.

The surreal nature of the series allowed Gilliam's animation to go off on bizarre, imaginative tangents, features that were impossible to produce with live-action at the time. Some running gags derived from these animations were a giant hedgehog named Spiny Norman who appeared over the tops of buildings shouting, "Dinsdale!", further petrifying the paranoid Dinsdale Piranha, and The Foot of Cupid, the giant foot that suddenly squashed things. The latter was appropriated from the figure of Cupid in the Agnolo Bronzino painting Venus, Cupid, Folly and Time and appeared in the opening credits of every series to crush the show's title when it appeared on-screen.

Notable Gilliam sequences for the show include Conrad Poohs and his Dancing Teeth, the rampage of the cancerous black spot, The Killer Cars and a giant cat that stomps its way through London, destroying everything in its path.

Initially only hired to be the animator of the series, Gilliam was not thought of (even by himself) as an on-screen performer at first, being American and not very good at the deep and sometimes exaggerated English accent of his fellows. The others felt they owed him something and so he sometimes appeared before the camera, usually in the parts that no one else wanted to play, generally because they required a lot of make-up or involved uncomfortable costumes. The most recurrent of these was The-Knight-Who-Hits-People-With-A-Chicken, a knight in armour who would walk on-set and hit another character on the head with a plucked chicken either to end a sketch or when they said something really corny. Some of Gilliam's other on-screen portrayals included:

- A man with a stoat through his head
- Cardinal Fang in "The Spanish Inquisition"
- A dandy wearing only a mask, bikini underwear and a cape, in "The Visitors"
- A hotel clerk in "The Cycling Tour" episode
- A trouser-less man with a multi coloured wig and a Goat on a lead asking for "Mrs. Rogers" at the start of the New Gas Cooker sketch.
- A fat and appallingly flatulent young man obsessed with (and covered in) baked beans in the "Most Awful Family In Britain" sketch.
- A wheelchair using security guard, sporting an enormous sword through his head.
- Percy Bysshe Shelley in the "Michael Ellis" episode

Gilliam soon became distinguished as the go-to member for the most obscenely grotesque characters. This carried over into the Holy Grail film, where Gilliam played King Arthur's hunchbacked page 'Patsy' and the bridgekeeper at the Bridge of Death as well as the 'deaf and mad' jailer in Life of Brian. In Monty Python's The Meaning of Life Terry Jones thought Mr Creosote should be played by fellow Python Terry Gilliam, before Gilliam persuaded Jones to play the role instead.

=== Idle ===
Eric Idle is known for his roles as a cheeky, suggestive playboy ("Nudge Nudge"), a variety of pretentious television presenters (such as his over-the-top portrayal of Philip Jenkinson in the segments connecting the "Cheese Shop" and "Salad Days" sketches), a crafty, slick salesman ("Door-to-Door Joke Salesman", "Encyclopedia Salesman") and the merchant who loves to haggle in Monty Python's Life of Brian. He is acknowledged as 'the master of the one-liner' by the other Pythons, along with his ability to deliver extensive, sometimes maniacal monologues with barely a breath, such as in "The Money Programme". He is also considered the best singer/songwriter in the group; for example, he played guitar in several sketches and wrote and performed "Always Look on the Bright Side of Life" from The Life of Brian. Unlike Jones, he often played female characters in a more straightforward way, only altering his voice slightly, as opposed to the falsetto shrieking used by the others. Several times, Idle appeared as upper-class, middle-aged women, such as Rita Fairbanks ("Reenactment of the Battle of Pearl Harbor") and the sexually repressed Protestant wife in the "Every Sperm is Sacred" sketch, in The Meaning of Life.

Because he was not from an already-established writing partnership prior to Python, Idle wrote his sketches alone.

=== Jones ===
Although all of the Pythons played women, Terry Jones is renowned by the rest to be 'the best Rat-Bag woman in the business'. His portrayal of a middle-aged housewife was louder, shriller, and more dishevelled than that of any of the other Pythons. Examples of this are the "Dead Bishop" sketch, his role as Brian's mother Mandy in Life of Brian, Mrs Linda S-C-U-M in "Mr Neutron" and the café proprietor in "Spam". Also recurring was the reserved upper-class straight man seen in "Nudge, Nudge" and the "It's a Man's Life" sketch, and incompetent authority figures (Harry "Snapper" Organs). He also played the iconic Nude Organist that introduced all of series three. Generally, he deferred to the others as a performer, but proved himself behind the scenes, where he would eventually end up pulling most of the strings. Jones also portrayed the tobacconist in the "Hungarian translation sketch" and the enormously fat and bucket-vomiting Mr. Creosote in Meaning of Life.

=== Palin ===
Michael Palin was regarded by the other members of the troupe as the one with the widest range, equally adept as a straight man or wildly over the top character. He portrayed many working-class northerners, often portrayed in a disgusting light: "The Funniest Joke in the World" sketch and the "Every Sperm Is Sacred" segment of Monty Python's The Meaning of Life. In contrast, Palin also played weak-willed, put-upon men such as the husband in the "Marriage Guidance Counsellor" sketch, the boring accountant in the "Vocational Guidance Counsellor" sketch, and the hapless client in the "Argument Clinic". He was equally at home as the indefatigable Cardinal Ximinez of Spain in "The Spanish Inquisition" sketch. Another high-energy character that Palin portrays is the slick TV show host, constantly smacking his lips together and generally being over-enthusiastic ("Blackmail" sketch). In one sketch, he plays the role with an underlying hint of self-revulsion, where he wipes his oily palms on his jacket, makes a disgusted face, then continues. One of his most famous creations was the shopkeeper who attempts to sell useless goods by very weak attempts at being sly and crafty, which are invariably spotted by the customer (often played by Cleese), as in the "Dead Parrot" and "Cheese Shop" sketches. Palin is also well known for his leading role in "The Lumberjack Song".

Palin also often plays heavy-accented foreigners, mostly French ("La marche futile") or German ("Hitler in Minehead"), usually alongside Cleese. In one of the last episodes, he delivers a full speech, first in English, then in French, then in heavily accented German.

Of all the Pythons, Palin played the fewest female roles. Among his portrayals of women are Queen Victoria in the "Michael Ellis" episode, Debbie Katzenberg the American in Monty Python's The Meaning of Life, a rural idiot's wife in the "Idiot in rural society" sketch, and an implausible English housewife who is married to Jean-Paul Sartre.

== Production ==
The first five episodes of the series were produced by John Howard Davies, with Davies serving as studio director, and Ian MacNaughton acting as location director. From the sixth episode onwards, MacNaughton became the producer and sole director on the series. Other regular team members included Hazel Pethig (costumes), Madelaine Gaffney (makeup) and John Horton (video effects designer). Maggie Weston, who worked on both makeup and design, married Gilliam in 1973 and they remain together. The series was primarily filmed in London studios and nearby locations, although location shooting to take in beaches and villages included filming in Somerset, Norwich and the island of Jersey.

Pre-production of the series had started by April 1969. Documents from the BBC showed that the viability of the show had been threatened around this time when Cleese reminded the BBC that he was still under contract from David Frost's David Paradine Productions, who wanted to co-produce the show. The BBC memos indicated the potential of holding off the show until 1971, when Cleese's contract with Paradine expired, but ultimately the situation was resolved, though the details of these negotiations have been lost.

== Broadcast ==
=== Original broadcast ===
The first episode aired on the BBC on Sunday, 5 October 1969, at 10:55 p.m. The BBC had to reassure some of its workers (who were considering going on strike and who thought the show was replacing a late-night, religious/devotional programme) by asserting that it was using the alternative programming to give clergymen time off on their busiest day. The first episode did not fare well in terms of audience, capturing only about 3% of the total UK population, roughly 1.5 million, compared to Dad's Army that had 22% on the Thursday of that same week. In addition to the lowest audience figures for shows during that week, the first episode has had the lowest Appreciation Index for any of the BBC's light entertainment programmes. While public reception improved over the course of the first series, certain BBC executives had already conceived a dislike for the show, with some BBC documents describing the show as "disgusting and nihilistic". Some within the BBC had been more upbeat on how the first series had turned out and had congratulated the group accordingly, but a more general dislike for the show had already made an impact on the troupe, with Cleese announcing that he would be unlikely to continue to participate after the making of the second series. Separately, the BBC had to re-edit several of the first series' episodes to remove the personal address and phone number for David Frost that the troupe had included in some sketches.

The second series, while more popular than the first, further strained relations between the troupe and the BBC. Two of the sketches from the series finale "Royal Episode 13" were called out by BBC executives in a December 1970 meeting: "The Queen Will Be Watching" in which the troupe mocks the UK national anthem, and the "Undertakers sketch" which took a comedic turn on how to dispose of the body of a loved one. The BBC executives criticised producer MacNaughton for not alerting them to the content prior to airing. According to Palin, via his published diary, the BBC started to censor the programme within the third series following this.

Cleese remained for the third series but left afterwards. Cleese cited that he was no longer interested in the show, believing most of the material was rehashes of prior skits. He also found it more difficult to work with Chapman, who was struggling with alcoholism. The remaining Pythons, however, went on to produce a shortened fourth series, of which only six episodes were made prior to their decision to end the show prematurely, the final episode being broadcast on 5 December 1974.

=== Lost sketches ===
Monty Python's Flying Circus' episodes are mostly preserved intact, unlike several TV shows that were influences on it (especially Q5, On the Margin and Not Only... But Also) that were mostly destroyed due to BBC policy of not keeping copies. Cleese feels that the show seems to modern viewers more innovative than it actually was because of this: "it looks like Python came out of nowhere". However, some sections of episodes were lost.

The first cut that the BBC forced on the show was the removal of David Frost's phone number from re-airings of the second episode of the first season, "Sex and Violence", in the sketch "The Mouse Problem". The Pythons had slipped in a real contact number for David Frost to the initial airing, which resulted in numerous viewers bothering him.

Some material originally recorded went missing later, such as the use of the word "masturbating" in the "Summarize Proust" sketch (which was muted during the first airing, and later cut out entirely) or "What a silly bunt" in the Travel Agent sketch (which featured a character [Idle] who has a speech impediment that makes him pronounce "C"s as "B"s), which was cut before the sketch ever went to air. However, when this sketch was included in the album Monty Python's Previous Record and the Live at the Hollywood Bowl film, the line remained intact. Both sketches were included in the Danish DR K re-airing of all episodes ("Episode 31", aired 1 November 2018, 6:50 pm).

Some sketches were deleted in their entirety and later recovered. One such sketch is the "Party Political Broadcast (Choreographed)", where a Conservative Party spokesman (Cleese) delivers a party political broadcast before getting up and dancing, being coached by a choreographer (Idle), and being joined by a chorus of spokesmen dancing behind him. The camera passes two Labour Party spokesmen practising ballet, and an animation featuring Edward Heath in a tutu. Once deemed lost, a home-recorded tape of this sketch, captured from a broadcast from Buffalo, New York PBS outlet WNED-TV, turned up on YouTube in 2008. Another high-quality recording of this sketch, broadcast on WTTW in Chicago, has also turned up on YouTube. The Buffalo version can be seen as an extra on the new Region 2/4 eight-disc The Complete Monty Python's Flying Circus DVD set. The Region 1 DVD of Before The Flying Circus, which is included in The Complete Monty Python's Flying Circus Collector's Edition Megaset and Monty Python: The Other British Invasion, also contains the Buffalo version as an extra.

Another lost sketch is the "Satan" animation following the "Crackpot Religion" piece and the "Cartoon Religion Ltd" animation, and preceding the "How Not To Be Seen" sketch: this had been edited out of the official tape. Six frames of the animation can be seen at the end of the episode, wherein that particular episode is repeated in fast-forward.

At least two references to cancer were censored, both during the second series. In the sixth episode ("It's A Living" or "School Prizes"), Carol Cleveland's narration of a Gilliam cartoon suddenly has a male voice dub 'gangrene' over the word cancer (although this word was used unedited when the animation appeared in the movie And Now for Something Completely Different; the 2006 special Terry Gilliam's Personal Best uses this audio to restore the censored line). Another reference was removed from the sketch "Conquistador Coffee Campaign", in the eleventh episode "How Not to Be Seen", although a reference to leprosy remained intact. This line has also been recovered from the same 16 mm film print as the above-mentioned "Satan" animation.

A sketch from Episode 7 of Series 2 (subtitled 'The Attila the Hun Show') featured a parody of Michael Miles, the 1960s TV game show host (played by Cleese), and was introduced as 'Spot The Braincell'. This sketch was deleted shortly afterwards from a repeat broadcast as a mark of respect following Miles' death in February 1971. Also, the controversial "Undertaker" sketch from Episode 13 of the same series, with its references to necro-cannibalism ("[...] are you suggesting we should eat my [dead] mother?"), was removed by the BBC after negative reviewer response. Both of these sketches have been restored to the official tapes, although the only source for the Undertaker sketch was an NTSC copy of the episode, duplicated before the cut had been made.

Animation in episode 9 of series 3 was cut out following the initial broadcast. The animation was a parody of a German commercial, and the original owners complained about the music use, so the BBC simply removed part of the animation, and replaced the music with a song from a Python album. Terry Gilliam later complained about the cut, thinking it was because producer Ian McNaughton "just didn't get what it was and he cut it. That was a big mistake."

Music copyright issues have resulted in at least two cuts. In season 2 episode 9, Graham Chapman as a Pepperpot sings "The Girl from Ipanema", but some versions use "Jeanie with the Light Brown Hair", which is public domain. In the bus conductor sketch in season 3 episode 4, a brief parody of "Tonight" from West Side Story was removed. Though it was later determined that this version never even aired on BBC at all, instead was first seen in the American broadcasts. There have also been reports of substituting different performances of classical music in some uses, presumably because of performance royalties.

A Region 2 DVD release of Series 1–4 was released by Sony Pictures Home Entertainment in 2007. This included certain things which had been cut from the US A&E releases, including the "masturbation" line, but failed to reinstate most of the long-lost sketches and edits. A Blu-ray release of the series featuring every episode restored to its original uncut broadcast length was released by Network for the show's 50th anniversary in 2019.

Rediscovered sketch Ursula Hitler, once deemed impossible to find, was re-released with the 50th anniversary sets in 2019. Also some of the extra American broadcast material — for instance, the original parody of "Tonight" from West Side Story in the bus conductor sketch from season 3, episode 4 — were included as deleted scenes.

=== American television ===
At the time of the original broadcasting of Monty Python in the United Kingdom, the BBC used Time-Life Television to distribute its shows in the United States. For Monty Python, Time-Life had been concerned that the show was "too British" in its humour to reach American audiences, and did not opt to bring the programme across. However, the show became a fixture on the Canadian Broadcasting Corporation beginning in the fall of 1970, and hence was also seen in some American markets.

The Pythons' first film, And Now for Something Completely Different, a selection of skits from the show released in the UK in 1971 and in the United States in 1972, was not a hit in the USA. During their first North American tour in 1973, the Pythons performed twice on US television, firstly on The Tonight Show, hosted by Joey Bishop, and then on The Midnight Special. The group spoke of how badly the first appearance went down with the audience; Idle described The Tonight Show performance: "We did thirty minutes [thirty minutes' worth of material] in fifteen minutes to no laughs whatsoever. We ran out onto the green grass in Burbank and we lay down and laughed for 15 minutes because it was the funniest thing ever. In America they didn't know what on earth we were talking about."

Despite the poor reception on their live appearances on American television, the Pythons' American manager, Nancy Lewis, began to push the show herself into the States. In 1974, the PBS member station KERA in Dallas was the first television station in the United States to broadcast episodes of Monty Python's Flying Circus, and is often credited with introducing the programme to American audiences. Many other PBS stations acquired the show, and by 1975, it was often the most popular show on these stations. And Now for Something Completely Different was re-released to American theaters in 1974 and had a much better box office take that time. That would also set the stage for the Pythons' next film, Monty Python and the Holy Grail, released near simultaneously in the UK and the United States in April 1975, to also perform well in American theaters. The popularity of Monty Python's Flying Circus helped to open the door for other British television series to make their way into the United States via PBS and its member stations. One notable American fan of Monty Python was singer Elvis Presley. Billy Smith, Presley's cousin noted that during the last few months of Presley's life in 1977, when Elvis was addicted to prescription drugs and mainly confined to his bedroom at his mansion Graceland, Elvis would sit at his room and chat with Smith for hours about various topics including among other things, Presley's favourite Monty Python sketches.

With the rise in American popularity, the ABC network acquired rights to show select episodes of Monty Python's Flying Circus in their Wide World of Entertainment showcase in mid 1975. However, ABC re-edited the episodes, thus losing the continuity and flow intended in the originals. When ABC refused to stop treating the series in this way, the Pythons took them to court. Initially the court ruled that their artistic rights had indeed been violated, but it refused to stop the ABC broadcasts. However, on appeal the team gained control over all subsequent US broadcasts of its programmes. The case also led to their gaining the master tapes of the series from the BBC, once their original contracts ended at the end of 1980.

The show also aired on MTV in 1988. Monty Python was part of a two-hour comedy block on Sunday nights that also included another BBC series, The Young Ones.

In April 2006, Monty Python's Flying Circus returned to non-cable American television directly through PBS. In connection with this, PBS commissioned Monty Python's Personal Best, a six-episode series featuring each Python's favourite sketches, plus a tribute to Chapman, who died in 1989. BBC America has aired the series on a sporadic basis since the mid-2000s, in an extended 40-minute time slot in order to include commercials. IFC acquired the rights to the show in 2009, though not exclusive, as BBC America still airs occasional episodes of the show. IFC also presented a six-part documentary Monty Python: Almost the Truth (The Lawyers Cut), produced by Terry Jones's son Bill.

== Subsequent projects ==
=== Live shows with original cast ===
The members of Monty Python embarked on a series of stage shows during and after the television series. These mostly consisted of sketches from the series, though they also revived material which predated it. One such sketch was the Four Yorkshiremen sketch, written by Cleese and Chapman with Marty Feldman and Tim Brooke-Taylor, and originally performed for At Last the 1948 Show; the sketch subsequently became part of the live Python repertoire. The shows also included songs from collaborator Neil Innes.

Recordings of four of these stage shows have subsequently appeared as separate works:

1. Monty Python Live at Drury Lane (aka Monty Python Live at the Theatre Royal, Drury Lane), released in the UK in 1974 as their fifth record album
2. Monty Python Live at City Center, performed in New York City and released as a record in 1976 in the US
3. Monty Python Live at the Hollywood Bowl, recorded in Los Angeles in 1980 and released as a film in 1982
4. Monty Python Live (Mostly): One Down, Five to Go, the troupe's reunion/farewell show, ran for 10 shows at The O2 Arena in London in July 2014. The final performance on 20 July was live streamed to cinemas worldwide. A re-edited version was later released on Blu-ray, DVD and double Compact Disc; the CD version is exclusive to the deluxe version of the release which contains all three formats on four discs housed in a 60-page hardback book.

Graham Chapman and Michael Palin also performed on stage at the Knebworth Festival in 1975 with Pink Floyd.

=== French adaptation ===
In 2005, a troupe of actors headed by Rémy Renoux translated and "adapted" a stage version of Monty Python's Flying Circus into French. Usually the original actors defended their material very closely, but given in this case the "adaptation" and also the translation into French (with subtitles), the group supported this production. The adapted material largely adhered to the original text, primarily deviating when it came to ending a sketch, something the Python members themselves changed many times over the course of their stage performances. Language differences also occur in the lyrics of several songs. For example, "Sit on My Face" (which translated into French would be "Asseyez-vous sur mon visage") becomes "cum in my mouth".

== Reception ==
=== Initial reviews ===
After the broadcast of the first episode, British newspapers printed brief reviews of the new programme. Reviewers had mixed opinions. One wrote that the show was "absurd and frivolous", and that it did not "offer anything very new or exciting". Another described the show as "enjoyably Goonish", saying that not all of the material was "scintillating" but that "there was enough packed into the 30 minutes to raise a few laughs." The Reading Evening Post's columnist was more enthusiastic, calling the show "much-needed comedy" and noting that "The real laughs, for me, came from the crazy cartoon and photo-montage work".

As the series continued, reviews became more positive. After the third episode, the Guardian's television columnist described the show as "undoubtedly the high spot of a lot of viewers' weekend", saying the humour was "whacky rather than satiric". A week later, the Observer's reviewer gave the series a "strong recommendation", saying "The material, despite a tendency to prolong a good idea beyond its natural length, is of a high standard, but what lifts the show out of an honourable rut is its extraordinary use of animated cartoons." However this positive view was by no means unanimous. An Evening Standard reviewer complained that "last week it almost crushed my enthusiasm and loyalty forever by transmitting a number of dismal skits that were little more than broad, obvious slapstick."

=== Awards and honours ===
Year	Award	Category	Nominee(s)	Result
1970	BAFTA TV Award	Special Award	Monty Python's Flying Circus; For the production, writing and performances.	Won
1970	BAFTA TV Award	Special Award	Terry Gilliam; For the graphics.	Won
1970	BAFTA TV Award	Best Light Entertainment	John Howard Davies; Ian MacNaughton	Nominated
1970	BAFTA TV Award	Best Light Entertainment Personality	John Cleese	Nominated
1970	BAFTA TV Award	Best Script	Writing Team	Nominated
1971	BAFTA TV Award	Best Light Entertainment Performance	John Cleese	Nominated
1971	BAFTA TV Award	Best Light Entertainment Production	Ian MacNaughton	Nominated
1973	BAFTA TV Award	Best Light Entertainment Performance	Monty Python	Nominated
1973	BAFTA TV Award	Best Light Entertainment Programme	Ian MacNaughton	Won
1975	BAFTA TV Award	Best Light Entertainment Programme	Ian MacNaughton	Nominated
2008	Online Film & Television Association Awards	OFTA TV Hall of Fame	Monty Python's Flying Circus	Won

Recorded in 1998 as Monty Python Live at Aspen, the group received the American Film Institute Star Award.

Monty Python's Flying Circus placed fifth on a list of the BFI TV 100, drawn up by the British Film Institute in 2000, and voted for by industry professionals.

In a list of the 50 Greatest British Sketches released by Channel 4 in 2005, five Monty Python sketches made the list:

- 2: "Dead Parrot"
- 12: "The Spanish Inquisition"
- 15: "Ministry of Silly Walks"
- 31: "Nudge Nudge"
- 49: "The Lumberjack Song"

In 2004 and 2007, Monty Python's Flying Circus was ranked No. 5 and #6 on TV Guide's Top Cult Shows Ever.

Time magazine included the show on its 2007 list of the "100 Best TV Shows of All Time".

In 2013, the programme was ranked No. 58 on TV Guide's list of the 60 Best Series of All Time, while the Writers Guild of America ranked it #79 – along with Upstairs, Downstairs, Star Trek: The Next Generation and Alfred Hitchcock Presents – on their list of the 101 Best Written TV Series.

=== Legacy ===
Douglas Adams, creator of The Hitchhiker's Guide to the Galaxy and co-writer of the "Patient Abuse" sketch, once said "I loved Monty Python's Flying Circus. For years I wanted to be John Cleese, I was most disappointed when I found out the job had been taken."

Lorne Michaels counts the show as a major influence on his Saturday Night Live sketches. Cleese and Palin re-enacted the Dead Parrot sketch on SNL in 1997.

The show was a major influence on the Danish cult sketch show Casper & Mandrilaftalen (1999) and Cleese starred in its 50th episode.

In computing, the term spam and the name of the Python programming language are both derived from the series.

== See also ==
- At Last the 1948 Show
- Do Not Adjust Your Set
