= Argument Clinic =

Monty Python sketch

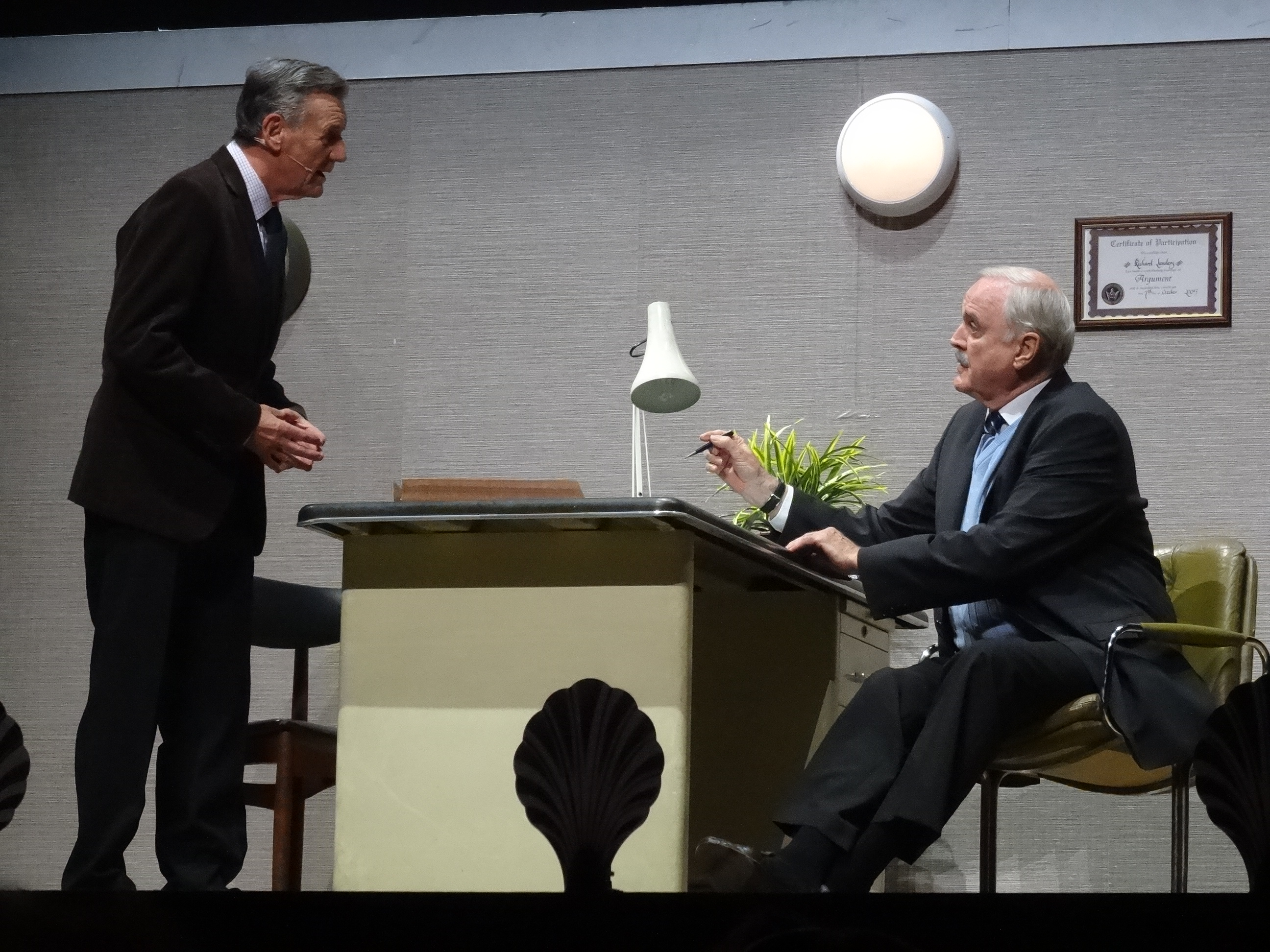
- Cleese and Palin performing the sketch live in 2014
- Writers: John Cleese; Graham Chapman
- Actors: Michael Palin; John Cleese; Graham Chapman; Eric Idle; Terry Jones; Rita Davies; Carol Cleveland; Dawn French; Chris Langham
- First appearance: "The Money Programme" (2 November 1972)

"Argument Clinic" is a sketch from Monty Python's Flying Circus, written by John Cleese and Graham Chapman. The sketch was originally broadcast as part of the television series and has subsequently been performed live by the group. It relies heavily on wordplay and dialogue, and has been used as an example of how language works.

== Plot ==
After the episode's end credits have scrolled, the BBC 1 mirror globe appears on screen, while a continuity announcer (Eric Idle) introduces "another six minutes of Monty Python's Flying Circus". In the ensuing sketch, an unnamed man (Michael Palin) approaches a receptionist (Rita Davies) and says that he would like to have an argument. She directs him to a Mr. Barnard who occupies an office along the corridor. The customer enters an office in which an unnamed office worker (Graham Chapman) hurls angry insults at him. The customer says that he came into the room for an argument, causing the office worker to apologize and clarify that his office is dedicated to "abuse"; "argument" is next door. He politely sends the customer on his way before calling him a "stupid git" out of earshot.

The customer enters the next office, where Mr. Barnard (John Cleese) is seated. The customer asks if he is in the right office for an argument, to which Barnard responds that he has already told him he is. The customer disputes this, and the men begin an argumentative back-and-forth exchange. Their exchange is a very shallow one, consisting mostly of petty and contradictory "is/isn't" responses, to the point that the customer feels that he is not getting what he paid for. They then argue over the very definition of an argument until Barnard rings a bell and announces that the customer's paid time has concluded.

The customer is dissatisfied and tries to argue with Barnard over whether he really got as much time as he paid for, but Barnard insists that he is not allowed to argue unless he is paid for another session. The man finally relents and pays more money for additional arguing time, but Barnard continues to insist that he has not paid, and another argument breaks out over that issue. He believes that he has caught Barnard in a contradiction—arguing without being paid—but Barnard counters that he could be arguing in his spare time. Frustrated, the customer storms out of the room.

He proceeds to explore other rooms in the clinic; he enters a room marked "Complaints" hoping to lodge a complaint, only to find that it is a complaint clinic in which the man in charge (Idle) is complaining about his shoes. The next office contains another man, Spreaders (Terry Jones), offering "being-hit-on-the-head lessons", which the customer finds a stupid concept. At that point a Scotland Yard detective, Inspector Fox "of the Light Entertainment Police, Comedy Division, Special Flying Squad" (Chapman) intervenes and declares the two men under arrest for participating in a confusing sketch. However, a second officer, Inspector Thompson's Gazelle "of the Programme Planning Police, Light Entertainment Division, Special Flying Squad" (Idle) comes in and charges the three for "self-conscious behaviour", saying "It's so and so of the Yard" every time the police appear, and for ending a sketch by having a police officer intervene.

As he realizes that he is a part of the skit's absurdity, another policeman (Cleese) enters the room to stop Thompson's Gazelle, followed by a hairy hand stopping him, and the sketch ends. Afterwards, the globe ident appears on screen while the announcer introduces "one more minute of Monty Python's Flying Circus".

== Writing ==
The sketch parodies modern consumer culture, implying that anything can be purchased, even absurd things such as arguing, abuse, or being hit over the head. The sketch was typical for Cleese and Chapman's writing at the time, as it relied on verbal comedy. Python author Darl Larsen believes the sketch was influenced by music hall and radio comedy, particularly that of the Goons, and notes that there is little camera movement during the original television recording.

One line in the middle of the sketch, "An argument is a connected series of statements intended to establish a definite proposition" was taken almost verbatim from the Oxford English Dictionary.

== Performances ==
The sketch originally appeared in the 29th episode of the original television series, entitled "The Money Programme", and was released (in audio only) on the LP Monty Python's Previous Record, on Charisma Records in 1972.

The sketch was subsequently performed live at the Hollywood Bowl in September 1980, which was filmed and released as Monty Python Live at the Hollywood Bowl. The sketch features the discussion with the receptionist (played here by Carol Cleveland), the abuse from Chapman, and most of the argument between Cleese and Palin. It is then ended abruptly by the entrance of Terry Gilliam, on wires, singing "I've Got Two Legs". A further live performance occurred in 1989 at the Secret Policeman's Ball, where Cleveland and Chapman's roles were replaced by Dawn French and Chris Langham. This performance was subsequently released on DVD. The sketch was performed again in July 2014 during Monty Python Live (Mostly), with Terry Jones filling in for Chapman's role and Gilliam reprising "I've Got Two Legs".

== Cultural references ==
The sketch has been frequently used as an example of how not to argue, because, as Palin's character notes, it contains little more than ad hominem attacks and contradiction, and does not contribute to critical thinking. It has also been described as a "classical case in point" of dialogue where two parties are unwilling to co-operate, and as an example of flawed logic, since Palin is attempting to argue that Cleese is not arguing with him.

The text of the argument has been presented as a good example of the workings of English grammar, where sentences can be reduced to simple subject/verb pairs. It has been included as an example of analysing English in school textbooks. The sketch has become popular with philosophy students, who note that arguing is "all we are good at", and wonder about the intellectual exercise one could get from paying for a professional quality debate.

The Python programming language, which contains many Monty Python references as feature names, has an internal-only module called "Argument Clinic" to pre-process Python files.

The sketch is referenced in a line of dialogue in the TV show House, season 6, episode 10, "Wilson". The character Dr. Wilson says to Dr. House "I didn't come here for an argument," to which House replies "No, right, that's room 12A," echoing the lines from the "abuse room" in the Argument Clinic sketch.

== See also ==
- Equivocation
- Ipse dixit
- Kettle logic
