= I've Got Two Legs =

Song performed by Monty Python

"I've Got Two Legs" is a song by the British comedy troupe Monty Python that was composed by Terry Gilliam. It most prominently appears in the concert film Monty Python Live at the Hollywood Bowl, the concert LP Monty Python Live at Drury Lane and the album Monty Python Sings. It also appeared at the 2014 reunion shows in the O2 Arena titled Monty Python Live.

At the Hollywood Bowl, Drury Lane, and the O2 Arena the song followed the Argument Clinic. Gilliam descended from the ceiling with a mandolin to perform the song. At the O2 the mandolin did however not feature but instead Gilliam performed the song in easy listening style, snapping his fingers.

Invariably, as he tries to begin the second verse, he is shot by another character (ostensibly over the song's banality) which, in the stage versions, graphically bursts open his entrails. On Monty Python Sings, the voice who introduces the song ("And now Mr Terry Gilliam will sing for you "I've Got Two Legs".) can be heard after the shooting saying "Thank you."
