= Spam (Monty Python sketch) =

1970 British comedy short

"Spam Song"

Single by Monty Python

from the album Another Monty Python Record
- B-side: "The Concert"
- Released: 8 September 1972
- Genre: Comedy
- Label: Charisma
- Songwriters: Michael Palin; Terry Jones; Fred Tomlinson
- Producers: Michael Palin; Terry Jones

Monty Python singles chronology
"Spam Song" (1972)	"Eric The Half A Bee" (1972)

"Spam" is a Monty Python sketch, first televised in 1970 on Monty Python's Flying Circus (series 2, episode 12, "Spam") and written by Terry Jones and Michael Palin. In the sketch, two customers are lowered by wires into a greasy-spoon café and try to order a breakfast from a menu that includes Spam in almost every dish, much to the consternation of one of the customers. As the waitress recites the Spam-filled menu, a group of Viking patrons drowns out all conversations with a song, repeating "Spam, Spam, Spam, Spam… Lovely Spam! Wonderful Spam!".

The excessive amount of Spam was probably a reference to the ubiquity of it and other imported canned meat products in the United Kingdom after World War II (a period of rationing in the UK) as the country struggled to rebuild its agricultural base. Thanks to its wartime ubiquity, the British public had grown tired of it.

The televised sketch and several subsequent performances feature Terry Jones as the waitress, Eric Idle as Mr. Bun and Graham Chapman as Mrs. Bun, who does not like Spam. The original sketch also featured John Cleese as the Hungarian and Palin as a historian, but this part was left out of the audio version of the sketch recorded for the team's second album Another Monty Python Record (1971). A year later, this track was released as the Pythons' first 7" single.

The use of the term spam for unsolicited electronic communications is derived from this sketch.

== Plot ==
Terry Jones (behind counter), Eric Idle, Graham Chapman and the Vikings in the Monty Python sketch "Spam"

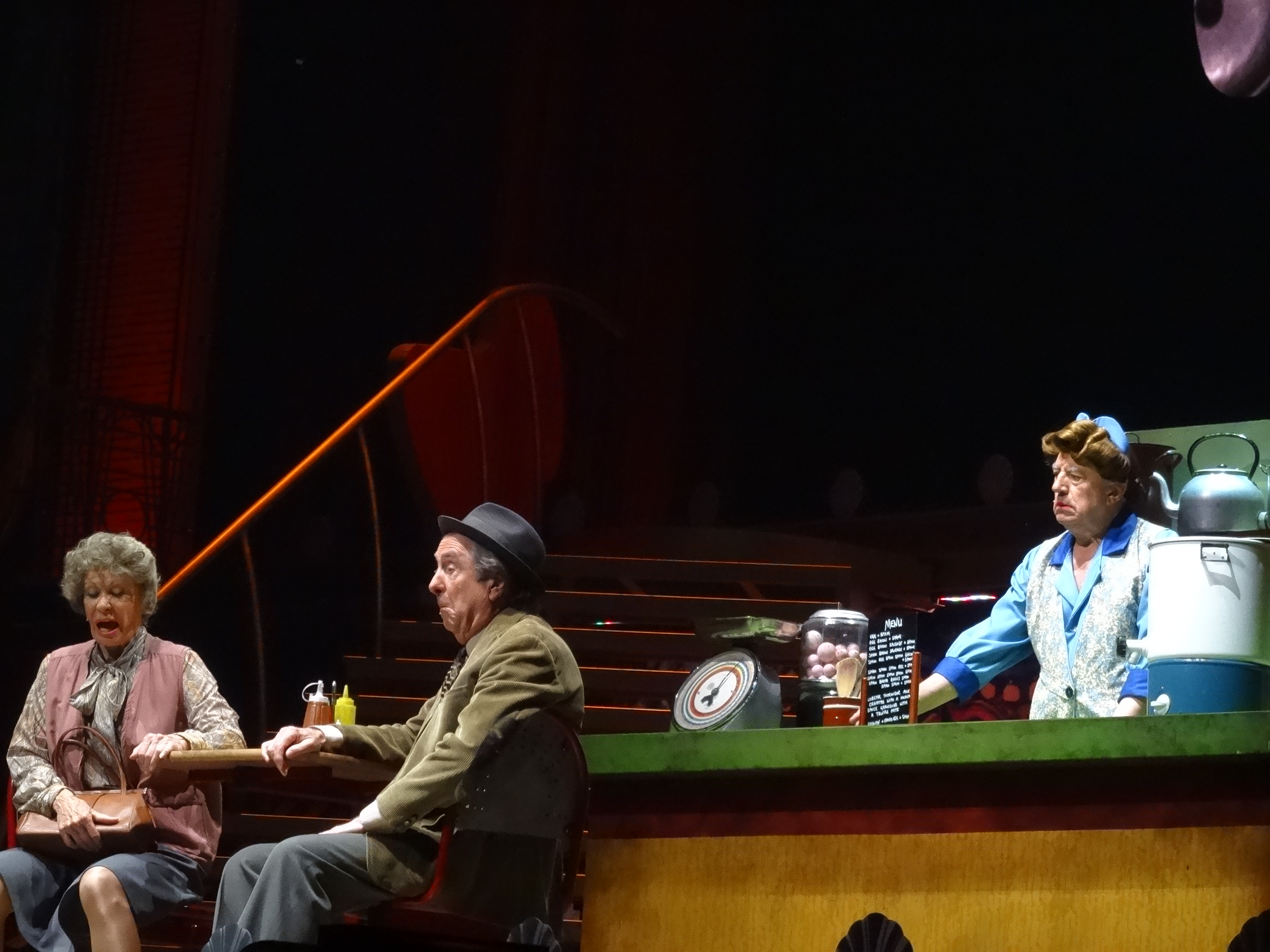
Spam sketch at Monty Python Live (Mostly) in 2014

The three-and-a-half-minute sketch is set in the fictional Green Midget Cafe in Bromley. An argument develops between the waitress, who recites a menu in which nearly every dish contains Spam, and Mrs. Bun, who does not like Spam. She asks for a dish without Spam, much to the amazement of her Spam-loving husband. The waitress responds to this request with disgust. Mr. Bun offers to take her Spam, instead, and asks for a dish containing a lot of Spam and baked beans. The waitress says the beans are not available; when Mr. Bun asks for a substitution of Spam, the waitress begins reading out the new dish's name.

At several points, a group of Vikings in the restaurant interrupts conversations by loudly singing about Spam. The irate waitress orders them to shut up, but they resume singing more loudly. A Hungarian tourist comes to the counter, trying to order by using a wholly inaccurate Hungarian/English phrasebook (a reference to a previous sketch). He is rapidly escorted away by a police constable.

The sketch abruptly cuts to a historian in a television studio talking about the origin of the Vikings in the café. As he goes on, increasingly he begins to insert the word "Spam" into every sentence, and the backdrop is raised to reveal the restaurant set behind. The historian joins the Vikings in their song, and Mr. and Mrs. Bun are lifted by wires out of the scene while the singing continues. In the original televised performance, the closing credits (which also have "Spam" inserted in various points among others) begin to scroll with the singing still audible in the background.

== Production notes ==
The sketch premiered on 15 December 1970 as the final sketch of the 25th show of Monty Python's Flying Circus, and the end credits for the episode were changed so all members of the crew has either Spam or some other food item from the menu added to their names. (Spam Terry Jones, Michael Spam Palin, John Spam John Spam John Spam Cleese, Graham Spam Spam Spam Chapman, Eric Spam Egg and Chips Idle, Terry Spam Sausage Spam Egg Spam Gilliam, etc.) The "Spam" sketch became immensely popular, and was ranked the fifth favourite Python sketch in a poll. The word "Spam" is uttered at least 132 times. The Vikings' Spam song is a parody of "The Viking Song" by Samuel Coleridge-Taylor.

This sketch has also been featured in several Monty Python videos including Parrot Sketch Not Included – 20 Years of Monty Python. A lead sheet for the song appears in Monty Python's Big Red Book. The DVD release of the episode contains a deliberate subtitling error. When the Hungarian tries to order food, his words are, "My lower intestine is full of Spam, Egg, Spam, Bacon, Spam, Tomatoes, Spam." Yet the subtitles read "Your intestine is full of Sperm." This is a continuation of the "Dirty Hungarian Phrasebook" sketch from the same episode.

The audio version of the sketch excludes the Hungarian and historian, and instead has the Vikings reaching a dramatic crescendo. The waitress, resigned to these disruptions, mutters "Bloody Vikings!". In the 2014 version of the sketch performed in Monty Python Live (Mostly), one of the Vikings replies "Racist bastard!" before leading the group into an operatic chorus that includes a sampling of "Finland" from the team's Contractual Obligation Album.

Spam was a popular food during World War II in the UK. Although rationed, it was generally easily available and not subject to supply shortages, as were other meats. Thanks to its wartime ubiquity, the British public eventually tired of it.

== Menu ==
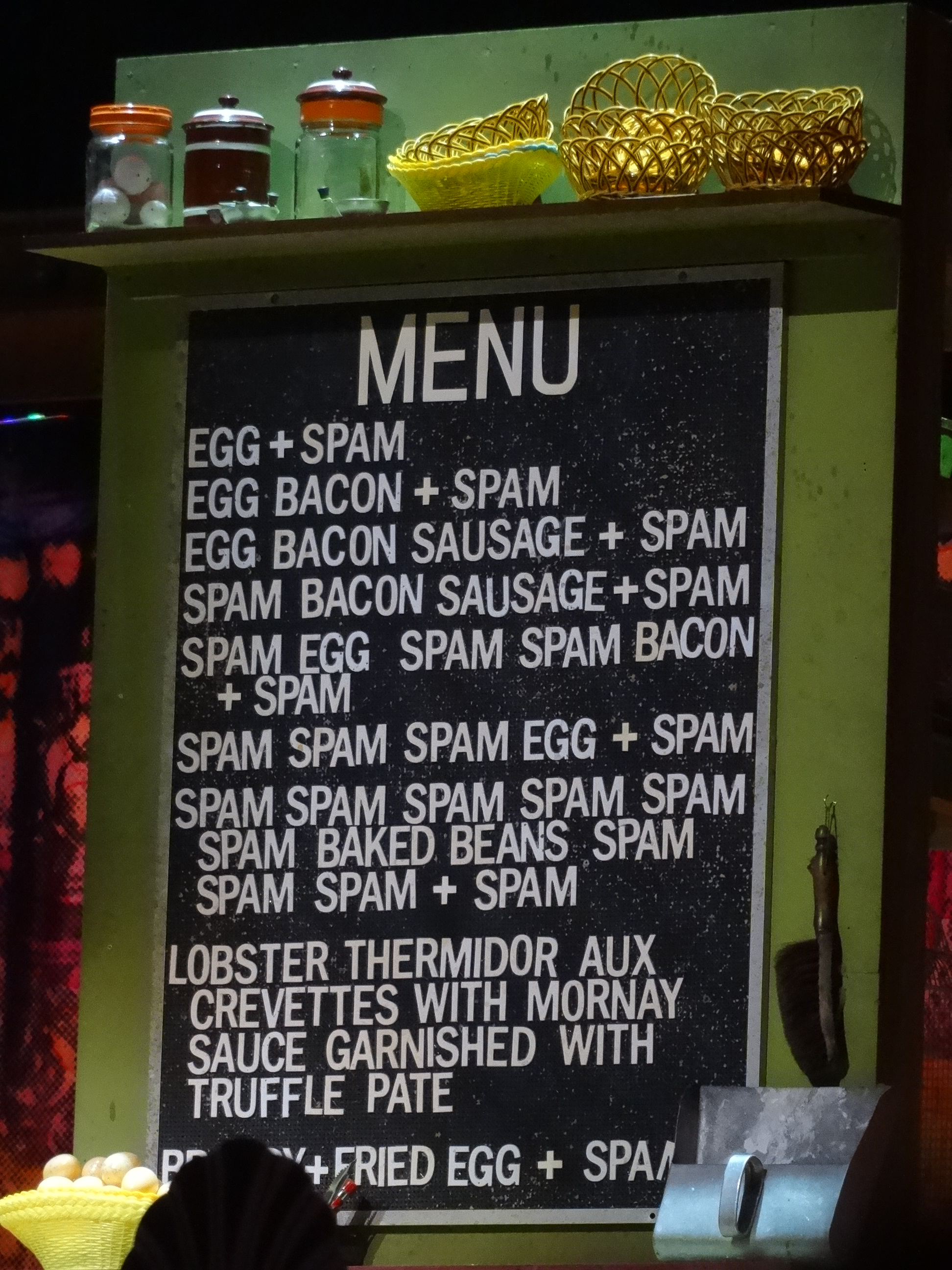
The menu at Monty Python Live (Mostly) in 2014

- Egg and bacon
- Egg, sausage, and bacon
- Egg and Spam
- Egg, bacon, and Spam
- Egg, bacon, sausage, and Spam
- Spam, bacon, sausage, and Spam
- Spam, egg, Spam, Spam, bacon, and Spam
- Spam, Spam, Spam, egg, and Spam
- Spam, sausage, Spam, Spam, Spam, bacon, Spam, tomato, and Spam (vinyl record)
- Spam, Spam, Spam, Spam, Spam, Spam, baked beans, Spam, Spam, Spam, and Spam
- Lobster Thermidor aux crevettes with a Mornay sauce, garnished with truffle pâté, brandy, and a fried egg on top, and Spam. (Television broadcast)

- Lobster Thermidor aux crevettes with a Mornay sauce, served in a Provençale manner with shallots and aubergines, garnished with truffle pâté, brandy, and a fried egg on top, and Spam. (vinyl record)

== Impact ==
The phenomenon, some years later, of marketers drowning out discourse by flooding Usenet newsgroups and individuals' email with junk mail advertising messages was named spamming, due to some early internet users that flooded forums with the word spam recounting the repetitive and unwanted presence of spam in the sketch. This phenomenon has been reported in court decisions handed down in lawsuits against spammers – see, for example, CompuServe Inc. v. Cyber Promotions, Inc., 962 F.Supp. 1015, n. 1 (S.D.Ohio 1997). Furthermore, it has been referenced in an Electronic Frontier Foundation amicus curiae brief to the Supreme Court of the United States in 2014. The term also is used to refer to mass marketing using junk phone calls or text messages, and has since entered video game culture as a term to refer to producing a large quantity of something, such as rocket-spamming or grenade-spamming.

The Python programming language, named after Monty Python, prefers to use spam, ham, and eggs as metasyntactic variables, instead of the traditional foo, bar and baz.

== Hormel's response ==
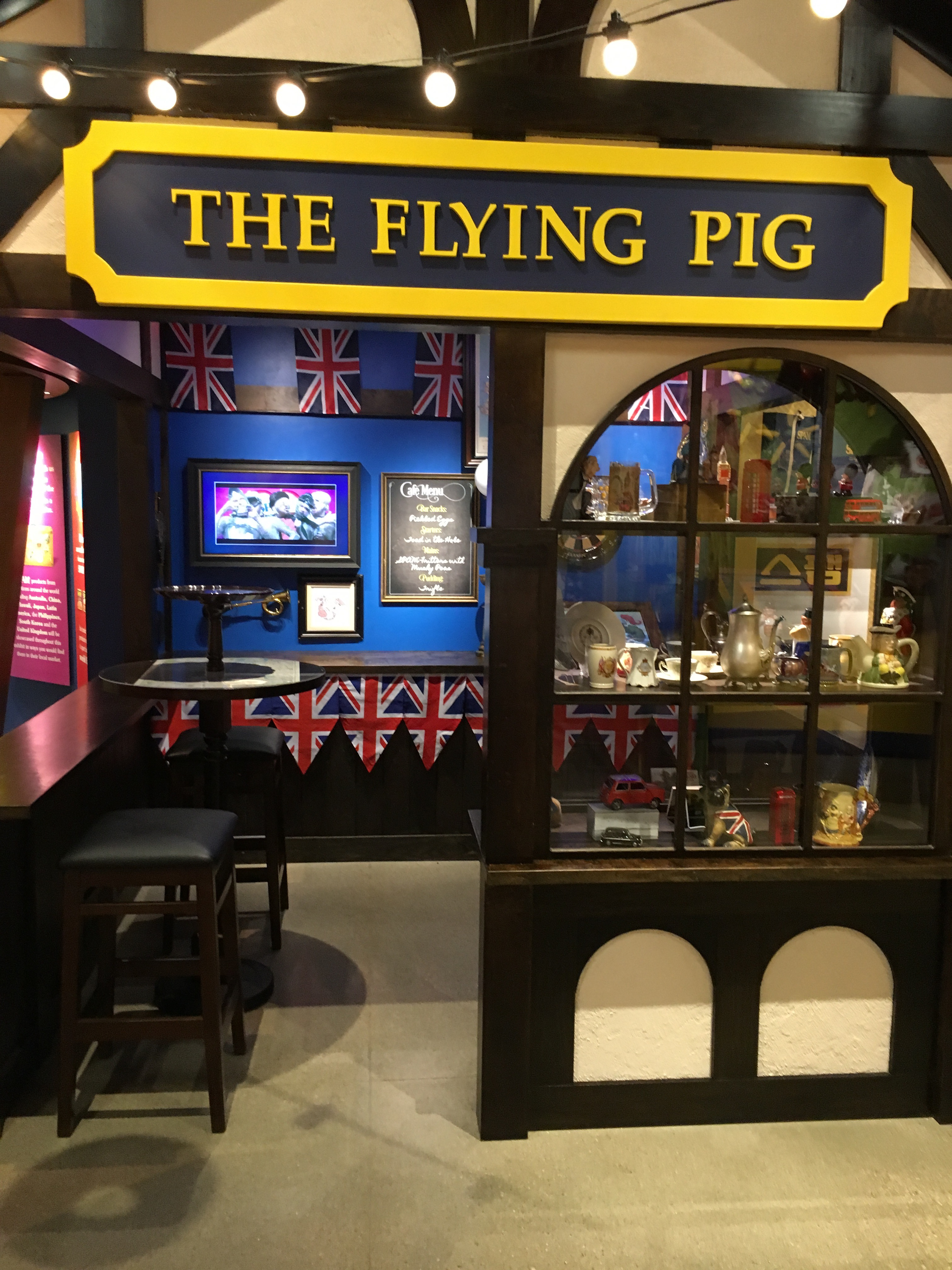
The sketch is featured at the Spam Museum in Austin, Minnesota, United States. Pictured: Flying Pig pub (England section)

Spam makers Hormel, while concerned with the use of the word spam for junk email, have been supportive of Monty Python and their sketch (despite the connection). Hormel issued a special tin of Spam for the Broadway premiere of Eric Idle's musical Spamalot based on Monty Python and the Holy Grail. The sketch is part of the company's Spam Museum in Austin, Minnesota, United States, and also mentioned in Spam's on-can advertisements for the product's 70th anniversary in 2007 – although the date of the Python sketch was incorrectly stated to be 1971 instead of 1970.

In 2007 the company decided that such publicity was part of their corporate image, and sponsored a game where their product is strongly associated with Monty Python, featuring a product with "Stinky French Garlic" as part of the promotion of Spamalot. For the company's 75th anniversary in 2012, they introduced Sir Can-A-Lot, a knight character, appearing on the product's packaging with the phrase "Glorious SPAM®!".

== See also ==
- Olympia Cafe
