= Polonaise in A-flat major, Op. 53 =

Solo piano piece by Frédéric Chopin

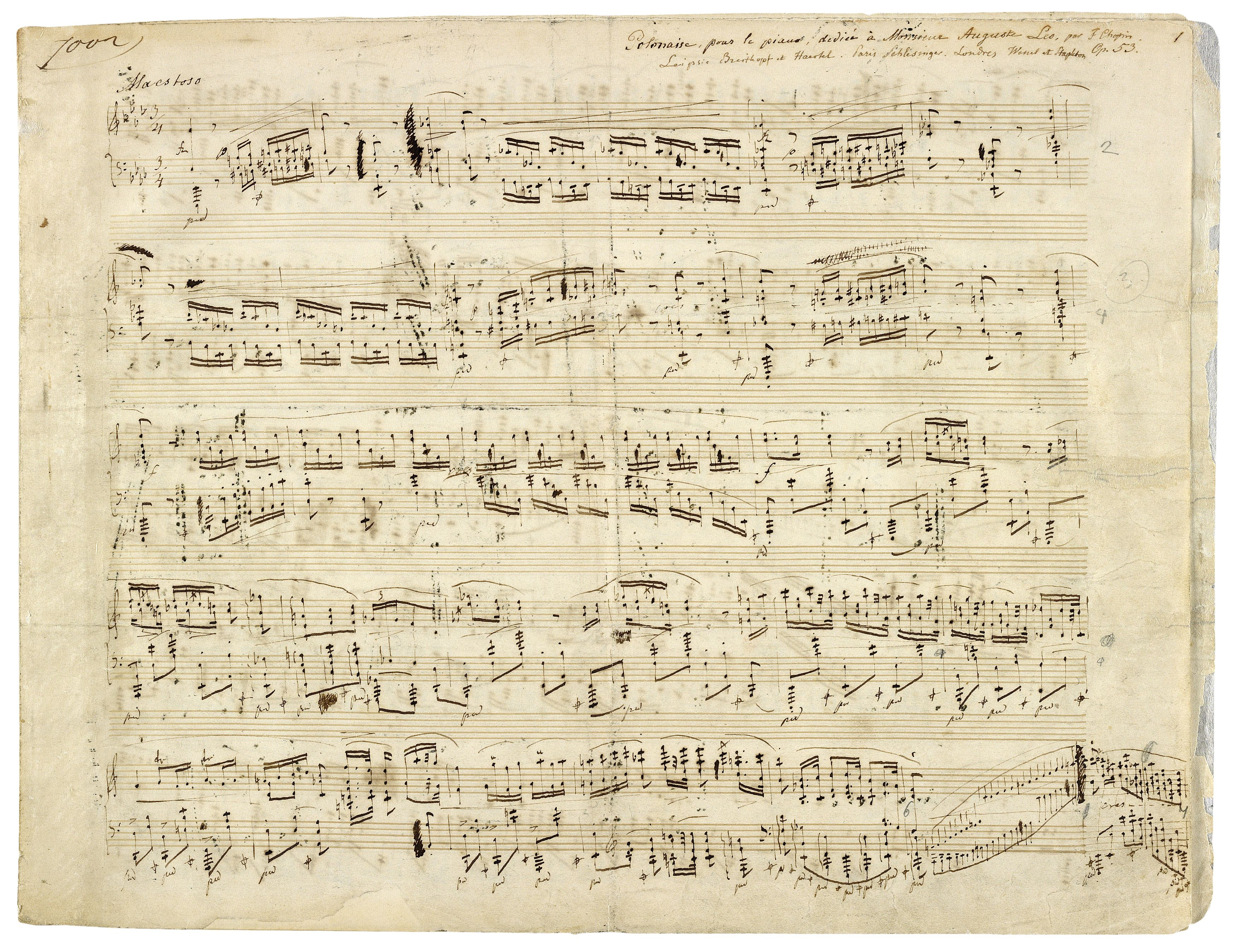
Original autograph score, 1842. Zoom

The Polonaise in A♭ major, Op. 53 (French: Polonaise héroïque, Heroic Polonaise; Polish: Heroiczny) is a solo piano piece composed by Frédéric Chopin in 1842 The piece was published in 1843, and is one of Chopin's most admired compositions and has long been a favorite of the romantic piano repertoire. Pianist Arthur Rubinstein once called it "the composition which is the closest to my heart." The piece requires exceptional piano skills and great virtuosity to be interpreted at a high degree of proficiency. It is also very physically demanding, and according to his student Adolphe Gutmann, Chopin played it more gently than most performers. The polonaise was dedicated to Auguste Léo, a German banker and friend of Chopin.

The autograph manuscript of the work is preserved in the Morgan Library & Museum.

== Origin of the sobriquet 'Heroic' ==
George Sand, Chopin's longtime lover and companion, responded vigorously to the Revolutions of 1848 as did many intellectuals of the day. When the 1848 Revolution began in France, women had fewer rights than men. Sand believed women's rights were necessary for progress. Around this time, Sand started her own newspaper which was published in a workers' co-operative. This allowed her to publish more political essays, expressing her strongly felt convictions. In one of these, for example, she wrote, "I cannot believe in any republic that starts a revolution by killing its own proletariat."

On hearing Chopin's Polonaise, Sand was left with a deep symbolic impression which she communicated to Chopin in their private correspondence. In one of their letters, she wrote passionately, "L'inspiration ! La force ! La vigueur ! Il est indéniable qu'un tel esprit doit être présent dans la Révolution française. Désormais cette polonaise devrait être un symbole, un symbole héroïque !" ("The inspiration! The force! The vigour! There is no doubt that such a spirit must be present in the French Revolution. From now on this polonaise should be a symbol, a heroic symbol"). In spite of Chopin's reluctance to bestow descriptive names on his music, music scholars and concert pianists have nevertheless associated the grand architecture of the music with this sobriquet, "Heroic."

== Technical aspects ==
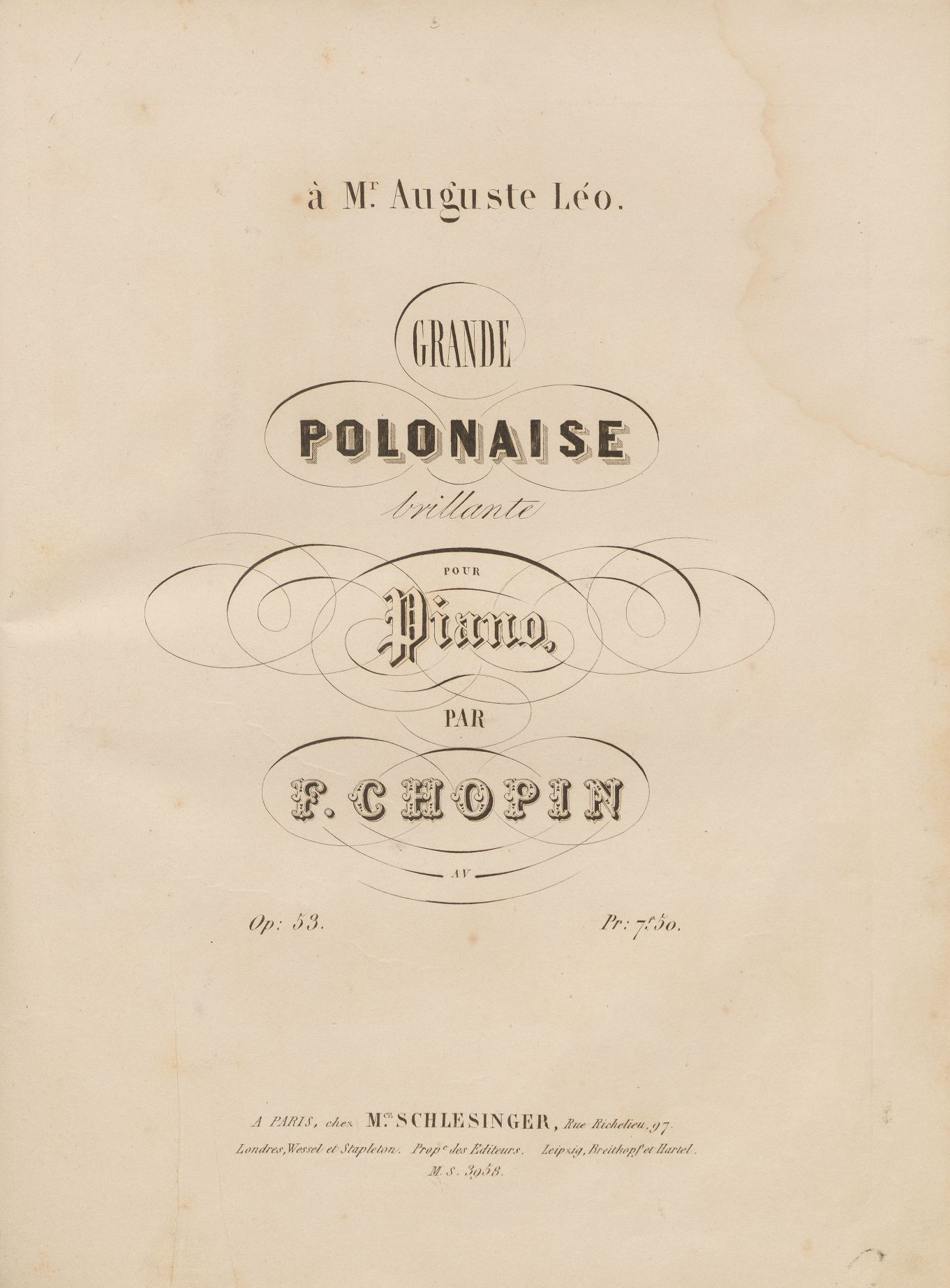
Title page of the French first edition, 1843

The polonaise features many difficult technical aspects, including:

- Fast ascending chromatic perfect fourths
- Rapid, highly difficult octave scaling
- Trills with the weaker fingers
- Quick scales
- Fast arpeggios
- Broken chords
- Chords with wide fingering
- Use of a wide range of the piano keyboard
- Large notational jumps

== Structure ==
The tempo of the piece is Alla polacca e maestoso ("like a polonaise and majestic"). The form may be viewed as intermediate between ternary (A-B-A) and rondo (A-B-A-C-A), since the first interlude is much shorter than the second (16 vs. 74 bars). The main theme is preceded by an introduction of about thirty seconds in length.

The piece features a grand introduction with fast ascending chromatic notes in both hands, setting the mood of the piece; also, it shows the heroic side of Chopin's art. The first theme is a dance-like theme in the tonic key of A♭ major. It is the familiar part of the piece and has the left hand moving in pounding octaves. The theme is repeated up an octave with short trills that fill some of the auditory gaps in the theme. The first interlude presents a series of chord progressions that lead into a recount of the traditional polonaise melody, with the polonaise rhythm employed in the left-hand accompaniment. The main theme then repeats once more.

The second, main interlude (or trio section) opens with six loud arpeggio chords before switching to a very soft bass ostinato of descending octaves first in the key of E major and then in E♭ major (written as D♯ major). A march-like melody follows the descending octaves and this occurs twice, and then a long lyrical interlude firstly with harmonic chord progressions and frequent modulations. This ends in a descending passage before the main theme is replayed. The theme is played louder and more dramatically and ends in a coda including material derived from the main theme. A typical performance of the polonaise lasts six and a half minutes.

The piece is written in 3/4 time but includes many implicit deviations from this metre.

Polonaise in A♭ major, Op. 53
Performed by Giorgi Latso

== Influence ==
The polonaise is quoted in the piano composition Anton Notenquetscher by Moritz Moszkowski.
