= Monty Python Live (Mostly) =

2014 film by Eric Idle

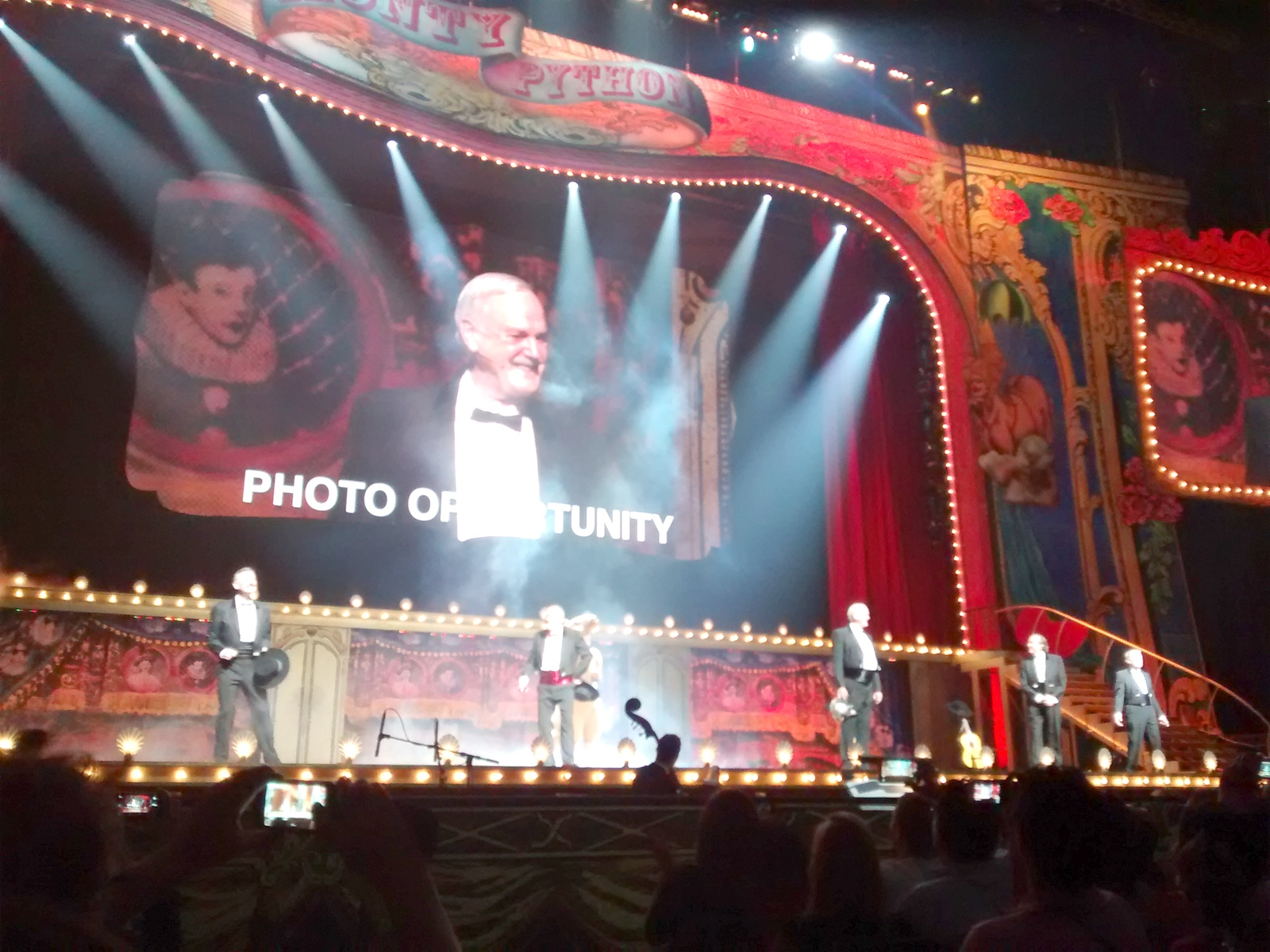
- The opening of the first reunion performance.
- Company: Monty Python
- Genre: Comedy
- Show type: Sketch show, stand-up, musical
- Date of premiere: 1 July 2014
- Final show: 20 July 2014
- Location: The O2, London

Creative team
- Written and conceived by: Graham Chapman; John Cleese; Terry Gilliam; Eric Idle; Terry Jones; Michael Palin

Other information
- Slogan: "One Down, Five to Go"

Monty Python Live (Mostly) (also billed as Monty Python Live (Mostly): One Down, Five to Go) was a variety show by the Monty Python comedy group at The O2 in London in July 2014. Planned as a single performance for 1 July, it was expanded to 10 shows due to the high demand for tickets. It was their first live performance together in 34 years, the second without member Graham Chapman (who died in 1989) and the last with Terry Jones (who died in 2020).

The final date was broadcast in cinemas around the world on 20 July. Prior to this Eric Idle stated, "It is a world event and that’s really quite exciting. It means we’re actually going to say goodbye publicly on one show. Nobody ever has the chance to do that. The Beatles didn't get a last good night."

== Overview ==
In 2013, the Pythons lost a legal case to Mark Forstater, the producer of their second film, Holy Grail, over royalties for its musical adaptation Spamalot. They owed a combined £800,000 ($994,600) in legal fees and back royalties to Forstater. To pay these, a reunion show was proposed. It soon became apparent to the group that owing to his theatrical experience with the creation of Spamalot (and because his schedule was free), Eric Idle was best suited to supervise the production. He envisaged an extensive assembly of the best-known Python sketches; to facilitate costume changes, they would be linked by short video clips and elaborate routines of the troupe's songs. The latter would be performed by a full chorus line, choreographed by Arlene Phillips. The music was to be arranged and conducted by Idle's long-time collaborator, John Du Prez. The ten stage shows were held on 1–5 and 15–20 July 2014. Tickets for the first night of the show sold out in 43 seconds of being available to purchase.

"Who wants to see that again, really? It's a bunch of wrinkly old men trying to relive their youth and make a load of money – the best one died years ago!"

— Mick Jagger in a promo video for the shows.

All five surviving Pythons performed on stage together for the first time in 34 years, with archive footage of Graham Chapman interspersed throughout the show. The three-hour show had a 30-minute intermission. The show was billed as "The show that leaves you wanting less". Some of the sketches were updated to include contemporary references. Carol Cleveland, who appeared in many of the original TV episodes, assisted by playing additional characters, as did newcomer Samuel Holmes, who was given several lead roles, some of which were originally played by Chapman. Eddie Izzard made a small guest appearance as a "Bruce" on the final night, as well as having appeared the previous evening as the "Blackmail" special guest. There were also surprise cameos by David Walliams, Mike Myers, Professor Brian Cox and Stephen Hawking among many others. Cox and Hawking were shown in a pre-recorded video towards the end of the Galaxy Song. While Cox was criticising the scientific flaws of the song lyrics, he was run down by Hawking in his wheelchair, who continued to sing the song. Robin Williams was scheduled to be the "Blackmail" special guest for the final night but declined, as according to Idle he was "suffering from severe depression" at the time, which ultimately contributed to his suicide in August 2014. When the show was released on video, it was dedicated to Williams.

The last of the ten performances was broadcast in the UK on the television channel Gold and internationally in cinemas by Fathom Events through a Dish Network satellite link on Sunday 20 July 2014. The filming of the performance was directed by Aubrey Powell. The film was released on DVD, Blu-ray, download and streaming on 11 November 2014. A re-edited audio-only recording of the show was exclusively included on two Compact Discs which formed part of the “Deluxe Edition” of the release – a 60-page 12 inch (30 cm) square hardback picture book with the DVD, Blu-ray and the two CDs housed inside the back cover. The audio only recording of the show omits some material due to its highly visual nature but includes additional dialogue and material not included in the video version. The CDs have a combined running time of 2 hours and five minutes.

== Critical reception ==
Critical reviews of the show were generally positive. Ed Power from The Daily Telegraph wrote, it was "poignant and predictable, but tremendous fun".

A negatively tinged review from the Daily Mail was incorporated into the last show, with John Cleese and Michael Palin criticising the newspaper and its editor, Paul Dacre, onstage.

The ten-night show was a financial success, allowing the members of the troupe to pay off their creditor, earn £2.2 million each and donate to selected charities.

== Cast ==
=== The Pythons ===
- John Cleese
- Terry Gilliam
- Eric Idle
- Terry Jones
- Michael Palin
- Graham Chapman (archive footage)

=== Also featuring ===
- Carol Cleveland
- Samuel Holmes

=== Special guests (in the "Blackmail" sketch) ===
- Stephen Fry – on the 1 July show
- Lee Mack – on the 2 July show (also appeared onstage at the end of the final show)
- Bill Bailey – on the 3 July show
- Noel Fielding – on the 4 July show
- Matt Lucas – on the 5 July show
- Warwick Davis – on the 15 July show (also appeared onstage at the end of the final show)
- Simon Pegg – on the 16 July show
- David Walliams – on the 18 July show
- Eddie Izzard – on the 19 July show (also appearing as a celebrity "Bruce" on 20 July and at the end)
- Mike Myers – on the 20 July show

Cameos (pre-recorded)

- Professor Brian Cox (also appeared onstage at the end of the final show)
- Professor Stephen Hawking (in the 20 July show, Hawking is seen in the audience following his recorded appearance)

== Sketches and songs ==
According to Dominic Cavendish at The Telegraph

=== Act One ===
- Overture
- Video: Opening RETARDIS animation
- Llamas
- Video: TV Series Opening Titles
- Four Yorkshiremen
- Video: Flying Mouth (animation)/ The Fish-Slapping Dance / World War Fish (animation)
- "Penis Song (Not the Noël Coward Song)"
- The Naval Medley/Ypres 1914
- Video: Colonel Stopping It / Batley Townswomen's Guild Presents the Battle of Pearl Harbour / David's Fig Leaf (animation)
- Why Michelangelo Didn't Paint The Last Supper
- "Every Sperm Is Sacred"
- Protestant Couple
- Video: God Complaining About the Show (redubbed from Monty Python and the Holy Grail) / Silly Olympics (from the first Monty Python's Fliegender Zirkus episode)
- Vocational Guidance Counsellor
- "The Lumberjack Song"
- Video: Charles Atlas-Dynamic Tension (animation) / The Philosophers' Football Match, first half (from the second Monty Python's Fliegender Zirkus episode)
- Bruces / "Bruces' Philosophers Song"
- Video: The Philosophers' Football Match, second half
- Crunchy Frog
- Blood, Devastation, Death, War And Horror
- "I Like Chinese"

=== Act Two ===
- Entr'acte
- Spam Lake (dance routine) / "Sit on My Face"
- The Death of Mary, Queen of Scots / Penguin on the Television
- Gumby Flower Arranging
- Camp Judges
- Video: Full Frontal Nudity (animation)
- Albatross
- Nudge Nudge
- Nudge Rap/Blackmail (dance routine)
- Blackmail
- Miss Anne Elk
- Video: Conrad Poohs and his Dancing Teeth (animation)
- Spanish Inquisition
- "Galaxy Song"
- Video: Brian Cox and Stephen Hawking° / Venus/Portrait People Dancing (animation)
- The Silly Walk Song (dance routine)
- Argument Clinic / "I've Got Two Legs"
- Captions
- Spam / Finland
- Pet Shop / Cheese Shop / Come Back to My Place
- Video: The Exploding Version of the Blue Danube / The Lady Eating Pram/Musical Statues (animation)
- "Christmas in Heaven"
- encore: "Always Look on the Bright Side of Life"

°Song was later released as a single by Stephen Hawking
