= Fred Tomlinson (singer) =

British choral singer and composer (1927-2016)

- Born: Frederick Tomlinson; 18 December 1927
- Died: 17 July 2016 (aged 88)
- Occupation: Singer
- Spouse: Pamela Mellor
- Children: 2

Frederick Tomlinson (18 December 1927 – 17 July 2016) was a British singer, choral director and composer. He founded the Fred Tomlinson Singers, who became well-known in the late 1960s for their association with the cult television series Monty Python's Flying Circus.

== Education and career ==
Tomlinson was born on 18 December 1927, in Rawtenstall, Lancashire. His father, also Fred (died September 1995), had founded the Rossendale Male Voice Choir in 1924 and conducted it for over 50 years. His older brother, Ernest Tomlinson, was a composer of orchestral light music. Fred won a scholarship to Manchester Cathedral choir school, attending until it closed in 1940 due to the war. He was then (aged 11) admitted to the Choir of King's College, Cambridge, attending King's College School, Cambridge. After that he went to Bacup and Rawtenstall Grammar School before studying music, mathematics, statistics, and the Italian language at Leeds University.

Tomlinson trained to become a teacher and served in the Royal Air Force in Singapore before embarking on a career in music. He joined the George Mitchell Singers, who were at the centre of a long-running television variety show franchise from 1958, lasting over two decades. That secured him links with the entertainment industry. He also formed his own vocal quartet, the Northerners, before establishing the Fred Tomlinson Singers in the late 1960s.

He composed original music under the name "Frederick Culpan" (his mother's maiden name) including The Chaucer Suite for chorus and orchestra. Tomlinson also arranged music for his father's choir. He was an active member of Equity’s Concert & Session Singers Committee.

== Monty Python and other television work ==
The Fred Tomlinson Singers sang the music featured on Monty Python's Flying Circus. Tomlinson also composed and wrote songs for Monty Python, including "The Lumberjack Song", which he co-wrote with Terry Jones and Michael Palin. He and his Fred Tomlinson Singers then performed "The Lumberjack Song" on the show in December 1969, as well as the song "Spam" in 1970 while dressed as Vikings.

More television work followed, including helping David Croft on Dad's Army and Are You Being Served?. Tomlinson also provided choral music for The Ken Dodd Show, The Goodies, The Two Ronnies (he was the soloist in the St Botolph Country Dance Team's rendition of 'Bold Sir John') and Only Fools and Horses, and there were musical contributions to documentaries such as Himalaya with Michael Palin, Timeshift, and The Amazing Race Australia.

== Peter Warlock ==
Tomlinson had a lifelong interest in the music of Peter Warlock and Bernard van Dieren. He acted as the chairman of the Peter Warlock Society for 25 years, producing editions of Warlock scores, and wrote several books about the composer, including A Peter Warlock Handbook (1974, 1977) and Warlock and van Dieren, with a van Dieren Catalogue (1978). His Centenary 'Curlew' Companion was arranged as a continuous suite of Warlock songs using the same instrumentation as The Curlew.

In 1971 Tomlinson put together a recording of drinking songs by Warlock, based on an anthology Warlock had compiled in 1929 using the name Rab Noolas (Saloon Bar written backwards). It was originally issued by Unicorn, and reissued in 2024 by Convivium.

== Personal life ==
Tomlinson married Pamela Mellor during the mid-1950s, having met her in Leeds. She sang as an alto with the Fred Tomlinson Singers. They had two daughters: Bridget (1957 – 6 October 1990) who died in a car crash; and Deborah, a sufferer from Rett syndrome, who died in 2011. Tomlinson died aged 88 on 17 July 2016 at his home in Walnut Way, Ruislip, after a long illness.
