= Manly Barton =

American politician (born 1949)

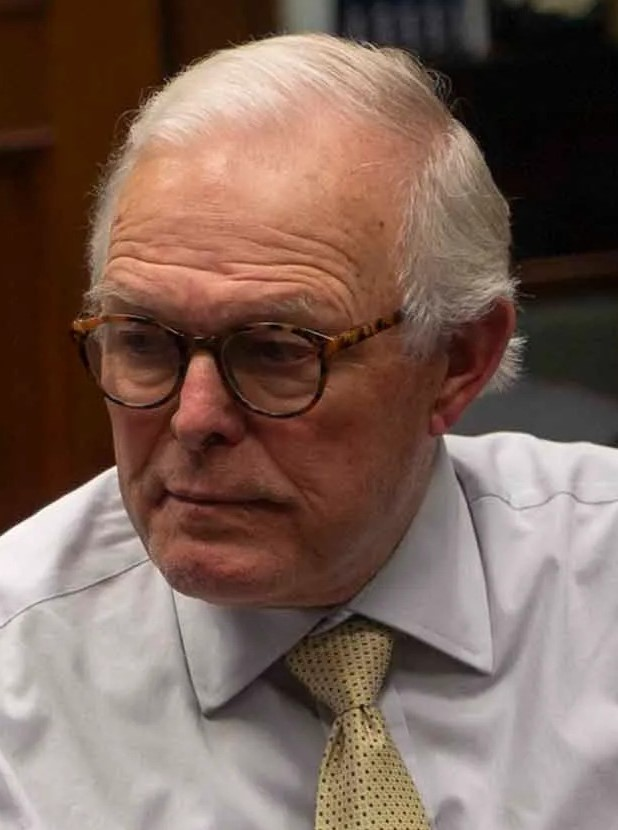

Speaker pro tempore of the Mississippi House of Representatives
- Incumbent
- Assumed office January 2, 2024
- Preceded by: Jason White

Member of the Mississippi House of Representatives from the 109th district
- Incumbent
- Assumed office January 3, 2012
- Preceded by: Frank Hamilton

Personal details
- Born: Manly George Barton; March 14, 1949 (age 77) Mobile, Alabama, U.S.
- Party: Republican
- Spouse: Sarah Thornton
- Education: Faulkner University (BA)

Military service
- Allegiance: United States
- Branch/service: United States Army
- Years of service: 1969–1971
- Rank: Specialist 5
- Unit: 227th Assault Helicopter Battalion
- Battles/wars: Vietnam War
- Awards: Bronze Star; Purple Heart

Manly George Barton (born March 14, 1949) is an American politician. He is a member of the Mississippi House of Representatives from the 109th District, being first elected in 2011. He was elected Speaker pro tempore in 2024. He is a member of the Republican party.

== Early life ==
Manly Barton was born March 14, 1949, in Mobile, Alabama. He graduated from Vancleave High School and Alabama Christian College.

Barton was drafted to serve in the Vietnam War for the U.S. Army. He received the Purple Heart, the Bronze Star for Valor, and a Bronze for Meritorious Service, Army Air Medal, and an Army Commendation Medal for his service with the 227th Assault Helicopter Battalion, 1st Air Cavalry Division.

== Career ==
Barton is a retired systems analyst for Chevron.

=== Politics ===
Barton served as a Jackson County Supervisor for 12 years prior to his time in the Mississippi Legislature from 2000 to 2012. As supervisor, Barton testified to the House of Representatives on the effects of the Deepwater Horizon oil spill on South Mississippi.

Upon the retirement of state Rep. Frank Hamilton, Barton decided to run for the 109th district in the Mississippi House of Representatives. During the campaign, he emphasized economic development, education, rural issues, and infrastructure funding. He was elected to represent the 109th district in 2011 after a competitive primary and assumed office in 2012 after an uncontested general election. Barton defeated a third-party Libertarian candidate in 2015 with 87.7% of the vote, and had uncompetitive general elections in 2019 and 2023.

In 2020, Barton voted in favor of changing the Mississippi state flag after pressure from Speaker Phillip Gunn and his wife.

He was elected Speaker pro tempore in 2024, serving under Speaker Jason White.

== Personal life ==
He is married to Sarah Thornton and is of Methodist faith.

In 2020, Barton contracted COVID-19 was admitted to the intensive care unit in a hospital. Barton's son, an Ocean Springs teacher, died in 2023.

Barton is a member of the Military Order Purple Heart, American Legion, VFW, National Rifle Association of America, and East Central Civic Organization.

Mississippi House of Representatives
Preceded by Jason White	Speaker pro tempore of the Mississippi House of Representatives; 2024–present	Incumbent
