= Barbara Blackmon =

American politician (born 1955)

Member of the Mississippi State Senate from the 21st district
- In office January 5, 2016 – January 2, 2024
- Preceded by: Kenneth Wayne Jones
- Succeeded by: Bradford Blackmon
- In office March 16, 1992 – January 6, 2004
- Preceded by: Ollie Mohamed
- Succeeded by: Joseph C. Thomas

Personal details
- Born: Barbara Anita Martin; December 7, 1955 (age 70) Jackson, Mississippi, U.S.
- Party: Democratic
- Spouse: Edward Blackmon Jr. (m. 1986)
- Children: Madison, Edward, and Bradford

Barbara Anita Blackmon (née Martin, born December 7, 1955) is an American lawyer and politician who served in the Mississippi State Senate, representing the 21st district from 1992 to 2004 and from 2016 to 2024. She was also the Democratic Party's nominee for Lieutenant Governor in 2003, losing to Amy Tuck.

== Early life and education ==
Barbara Martin was born on December 7, 1955, in Jackson, Mississippi. She was the seventh of nine children of farmer and lumber mill worker Julious Martin (died 1999) and his wife, homemaker Willie Thelma (Barnes) Martin (1921-2012). Neither of her parents had graduated from high school, although her mother later obtained her G.E.D. at the age of 50. During her childhood, Martin and her siblings would spend their summers on their grandparents' farm near Utica, Mississippi, where they "spent a lot of time pruning, picking, planting, everything". She later cited her experiences on the farm "made her determined to get an education".

=== Education (1972-1982) ===
Barbara attended Wingfield High School, graduating at the age of 16. She then attended Jackson State University, obtaining her B.S. degree at 19. She then attended, and received a M.B.A. from the University of Alabama at the age of 20. Then, she taught for two years at Hinds Community College. Martin then enrolled at the Santa Clara University School of Law in 1978. She faced housing discrimination when attempting to rent an apartment there. Disliking the "very subtle" covert racism she experienced in California more than the overt racism in Mississippi, she later commented, "Give me Mississippi. At least there I know what I'm dealing with.". After a year living in Santa Clara, she moved back to Mississippi in 1979. That year, she entered the University of Mississippi School of Law, where she became the President of the Black American Law Student Association. One of her professors was Karen Green (a tax law specialist professor), who encouraged Martin to attend Green's alma mater at New York University. Despite not knowing anybody in New York, Martin moved to New York City to attend the university. She graduated in 1982, receiving a L. L. M. degree in Taxation.

== Career ==
Martin is a member of the Mississippi State Bar and the New York State Bar. Martin spent the next year living alone in "a tiny apartment" in Midtown Manhattan and working in the tax department of the pharmaceutical company Bristol-Myers. She later noted that her success in New York City away from friends and family gave her the confidence that she had the ability to succeed anywhere. In 1983, she moved back to Mississippi, where she started a tax practice within the Banks & Nichols law firm. At a fundraising event in 1984, she met Edward Blackmon, Jr. , a member of the Mississippi House of Representatives. They married in 1986.

=== 1991-1995 ===
In 1992, as the Mississippi Legislature was redistricting, her husband Edward convinced her to run for the Mississippi State Senate. She ran on the premise of changing government spending, supporting an "activist government" that would give more opportunities to disadvantaged people. She won a special election, held on March 10, 1992, to replace District 20 Senator Bob Montgomery, who had resigned to "settle an ethics dispute". Edward did not expect her to win the election due to the district being majority-white. Blackmon won the election due to her own vigorous campaigning in majority-black Canton and rural northern Madison County, and door-to-door campaigning in majority-white southern Madison County, in which she answered questions and concerns of white voters. She was sworn in to the State Senate on March 16, 1992. She and Edward became the first husband-and-wife pair to serve simultaneously in the Legislature since John B. and Orene Farese. who had both been elected to Mississippi House of Representatives in 1951.

Later that same year, the districts were changed again, with 12 districts changed to better represent minorities by including more black voters. Her house was moved to District 21 (composed of Humphreys, Yazoo, and Madison Counties), one of the redrawn districts. Also living in the district was farmer and merchant Ollie Mohamed, a 67-year-old, 21-year Senate member and its incumbent president pro tempore. Blackmon and Mohamed faced each other in the Democratic primary on August 4, 1992. During the campaign, Blackmon outspent Mohamed, $35,000 to $10,600 respectively. Although Mohamed believed he was sure to win the primary, he lost to Blackmon, with 5,707 votes for Blackmon and 5,017 votes for Mohamed. In the general election, Blackmon defeated Republican challenger Cecil Cartwright (a retired manufacturer and former CIA agent) with a vote total of 11,256 to 8,003 votes. Cartwright called the election "a far cry from honest" and said that improper tactics were used in Yazoo polling locations. Cartwright was able to initiate a hearing by the Yazoo County Elections board. Regardless, Blackmon was sworn in in January 1993, and was the vice-chairwoman of the Senate's Finance Committee, where she directed millions of dollars to benefit to minority business owners, historically black colleges and universities, and small businesses. She was the first woman to hold the vice-chair of the Senate's Finance Committee. She was, also, appointed by Lieutenant Governor Eddie Briggs to serve on the powerful Legislative Budget Committee. She was the first woman appointed to that position. The term ended in January 1996.

=== 1995-1999 ===
In November 1995, Blackmon ran for re-election for her seat in the Senate. She faced the same opponent as she did in 1992, Republican Cecil Cartwright. Blackmon's goal for her new term would be to compensate for cuts in the most recent federal budget, stating that the cuts "will obviously have a much greater impact on blacks". Cartwright believed that government social programs were not beneficial to anyone and said, "I think we're all equal and should act equally. It's not just black-white. It's just social programs in general." Blackmon predicted that Cartwright had "a snowball's chance in hell" of winning the election. Blackmon won majorities in Humphreys and Madison Counties, although Cartwright won a majority in Yazoo County. She won the election with 9172 votes, compared to Cartwright's 6872 votes, or a 57.2 percentage margin.

After her term began in 1996, Blackmon was the Vice Chairman of the Constitution Committee as well as Local & Private Committee, and served on many others, including Appropriations; County Affairs; Highways & Transportation; Insurance; Investigative State Offices; Judiciary; and Municipalities. She had endorsed Republican incumbent Eddie Briggs in the election for Lieutenant Governor; Briggs lost, and Blackmon lost her favored position as Vice Chairman of the Finance Committee, as the new lieutenant governor (in charge of assigning senators to committees) wanted the tax bill passed. However, the new lieutenant governor, recognizing her skills, directed that she be appointed a subcommittee chair in Appropriations. She was the first woman to hold such a position.

In 1997, a law was introduced that would provide tax cuts for married couples. The bill was opposed by only three Democrats: Willie Simmons, Robert Johnson, and Blackmon (all also supporters of Briggs in the 1995 election). They opposed the bill due to concerns that the lack of extra tax revenue from the bill would hamper the state's ability to provide for adequate education and social services. In the same year, Blackmon voted for the passage of the Adequate Education Act of 1997, a bill meant to provide public schools with resources to "adequately educate" every student.

For the 1998 session, Blackmon supported giving increased salaries to teachers. She also supported using more money to improve Mississippi's colleges and universities, although she criticized satellite campuses as she considered that the colleges that had them were "spreading themselves too thin".

=== 1999-2003 ===
In 1999, Blackmon ran for re-election to the Senate, and was unopposed in the Democratic primary and general elections. After her term began in 2000, Blackmon became the Chairman of the State Library Committee and the Vice Chairman of the Insurance Committee. She was also a member of other committees: Constitution; Finance; Highways & Transportation; Judiciary; and Public Health & Welfare. In 2000, to protest the fact that the Legislature refused to review bills that considered removal of the Confederate war emblem from the state flag, Blackmon and other senators tried to use delay tactics by having budget bills be read aloud. When Lieutenant Governor Amy Tuck refused to read budget bills aloud, Blackmon and six other senators sued the lieutenant governor. A chancellor in Hinds County ruled that Tuck had violated the constitutional rights of the senators. However, the ruling was overturned by the Supreme Court of Mississippi, which ruled that the courts had "no business in an internal legislative squabble".

In 2002, Mississippi legislative districts were being redrawn. The redrawing process was closed to everyone but the federal and state governments. In order to open up the redistricting process to the public, Blackmon proposed identical $250,000 amendments of budget bills of different agencies, including the Department of Transportation and the Department of Archives and History, that would give the general public access to state data and computers so individual citizens could create their own plans for redistricting. However, these amendments were opposed, with Senate Appropriations Chairman Jack Gordon noting that the amendment was irrelevant to the budgets of the various agencies for which the budget amendment was proposed.

In the 2003 session, Blackmon announced that she was not running for re-election to the Senate in order to seek a different elective office. A Senate resolution was passed in her honor.

=== 2003 - Candidate for lieutenant governor ===
On February 21, 2003, Blackmon announced that she would be running for Lieutenant Governor of Mississippi. She campaigned around Mississippi "for months" following her announcement. She said that her main priority as lieutenant governor would be economic development and creating jobs. In late June, her candidacy was endorsed by labor union Mississippi Alliance of State Employees (MASE) (affiliated with the Communication Workers of America). On August 5, 2003, Blackmon faced former state Supreme Court justice Jim Roberts and Greenwood businessman Troy Brown in the Democratic primary. In part due to her lucrative law practice, Blackmon had raised $735,147 in her campaign, while Roberts had raised only about $225,000.

Blackmon won the primary and Democratic nomination, with 57 percent of the vote compared to Roberts' 37 percent and Brown's 9 percent. She became the first black person to win the Democratic Party nomination for a Mississippi statewide office, and the first black person of a major party to be nominated for lieutenant governor of Mississippi since Alexander K. Davis (who was impeached in 1876). Blackmon's race led to political experts and journalists questioning if her race would be a factor in whether people would vote for her. In the beginning of October 2003, in response to the pro-life policies of her Republican opponent, Amy Tuck, Blackmon openly challenged Tuck to sign a sworn affidavit that Tuck had never had an abortion.

On the election on November 4, Blackmon lost the election to Tuck, receiving 37 percent of the vote compared to Tuck's 61 percent. Blackmon cited her race as a factor in her loss, publicly stating, "It is my belief … that if my pigmentation were different, I would be the lieutenant governor of this state." Her abortion comment towards Tuck was also viewed to be a major factor that turned white voters against her.

=== In between terms - 2004-2015 ===
Blackmon's Senate term ended in January 2004. On Martin Luther King Jr. Day of that year, Blackmon criticized the state's incumbent governor, Republican Haley Barbour, for his Cabinet appointments; out of 12 spots, all officials were male and all but two were white. After Blackmon's Senate term ended, she continued practicing law at her and her husband's law firm.

=== 2015-2019 ===
In 2015, Blackmon ran again to represent District 21 in the Senate. On August 4, 2015, she competed against two-term incumbent Kenneth Wayne Jones (also of Canton) in the Democratic primary. According to the certified vote count, Blackmon defeated Jones by 34 votes, receiving 4,832 votes compared to Jones' 4,798 votes. Jones considered challenging the results of the election due to the closeness of the votes and apparent inconsistencies in how the votes were counted. Nonetheless, the initial certification stood. As no Republicans were running in the district, Blackmon's primary victory was tantamount to the election, and she took office in January 2016. In the 2016-2020 term, Blackmon was the vice chair of the Enrolled Bills committee, and also served on several other committees: County Affairs; Executive Contingent Fund; Finance; Highways and Transportation; Insurance; Judiciary A; and Medicaid.

=== 2019-2023 ===
In 2019, Blackmon ran unopposed in both the Democratic primary and general election and was re-elected to represent the 21st district for the 2020-2024 term. During this term, Blackmon chaired the Housing Committee, and was the vice chair of the Judiciary B Committee for one (1) year and then became vice chair of Highways and Transportation.. She also served on the Finance; Insurance; Judiciary A; Local and Private; Public Welfare and Medicaid committees. In June 2020, Blackmon voted yes on the bill to change the Mississippi state flag. In 2023, Blackmon initially filed for re-election alongside her son, Bradford; however, Blackmon dropped out, enabling Bradford to run unopposed for the primary.

== Personal life ==
Blackmon is a Baptist. She is a member of the Mississippi State Bar Association, the New York State Bar Association, and is a Life Member of the NAACP. Since 1986, she has been married to state representative Edward Blackmon Jr. One of their sons, Bradford (born 1988) has been elected to the 2024 Mississippi Legislature to take his mother's seat.

Party political offices
Preceded by Amy Tuck	Democratic nominee for Lieutenant Governor of Mississippi; 2003	Succeeded by Jamie Franks
