= Humor about Catholicism =

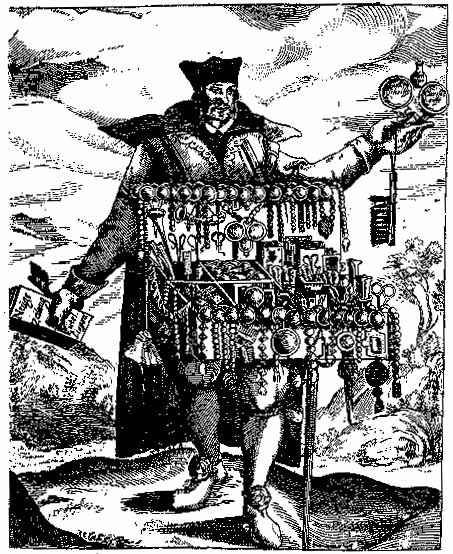
A caricature of Angelus Silesius in a protestant publication of 1664. The protestants denounced and attacked Silesius, a Catholic mystic, for all types of heresy and depicted him as a peddler of potions, gambling cards, and other immoral behaviors.

The Catholic Church has been a subject for humor, from the time of the Reformation to the present day.

Examples of fairly mild burlesque of the Church in the twentieth century include material by humourists such as the Irish comedian Dave Allen and the comedy show Father Ted.

== Television ==
=== Monty Python ===
Traditional fears about the Roman Catholic Church were burlesqued by Monty Python in their Spanish Inquisition sketch (first aired September 22, 1970) in which hapless victims of the Spanish Inquisition are threatened with the 'comfy chair' and other such innocuous implements of torture.

Another sketch by Monty Python featured a song "Every Sperm Is Sacred" (1983) which is a satire of Catholic teachings on reproduction which forbid masturbation and contraception by artificial means. The sketch is about a Catholic Dad (played by Michael Palin), his wife (Mum, played by Terry Jones) and their 63 children, who are about to be sold for medical experimentation purposes because their parents can no longer afford to care for such a large family. When their children ask why they don't use contraception or sterilization, Dad explains that this is against God's wishes, and breaks into the song "Every Sperm is Sacred". The real punchline comes a bit later, where the song and dance is observed through a window and a Protestant (played by Graham Chapman), after observing the large family's song and dance, briefly describes this "typical Catholic" situation to his wife (Eric Idle). He goes on to remark how, as a Protestant, he could go down to the store and unashamedly buy a condom, and that way, "because I'm a Protestant", intercourse is not bound to pregnancy, and therefore, available to them any time they wish. He also derides the Catholic family for their numerous progeny, noting they have good family planning, only siring two children. The wife remarks that that is the same number of times they have had intercourse.

=== Dave Allen ===
Irishman Dave Allen (1936–2005) was the host of several comedy series broadcast on UK TV from the 1960s to the 1990s. The most controversial was called Dave Allen at Large, which broadcast 1971–79 on UK TV. The programmes consisted of an introductory standup routine by Allen leading to handsomely mounted sketches that continued on the themes touched on in the opening monologue. The comedian's trademark debunking of religious, especially Catholic, ritual throughout each episode made for minor controversy which, coupled with some quite frank material, earned the show a somewhat risqué reputation. His later comedy series continued in the same vein and included sketches showing the Pope (played by Allen) and his Cardinals doing a striptease on the steps of St Peter's; aggressive priests beating up their parishioners and other priests; priests who spoke like Daleks though electronic confessionals; and an extremely excitable Pope who spoke in a Chico Marx type accent as he ordered Allen to "getta your bum outta Rome!"

=== Father Ted ===
The Father Ted series, broadcast on Channel 4 on UK television from 1995–98, follows the exploits of three Roman Catholic priests who preside over a parish on Craggy Island off the Irish coast. The reasons for their exile, which are hinted at across several episodes, appear to stem from a mixture of incompetence and embarrassing conduct: Father Dougal McGuire due to his stupidity and incompetence (with particular regard to the "Blackrock Incident", which is never further elaborated on, although Bishop Brennan mentions "the strings I had to pull to stop the Vatican getting involved"); Father Jack Hackett because of his alcoholism and implied womanising, which caused severe embarrassment to the Catholic Church (a "wedding in Athlone" is mentioned); and Father Ted Crilly for alleged financial impropriety. Ted insists he was innocent, regularly claiming that "the money was just resting in my account", and that it was "a perfectly legitimate monetary transfer". The senile Father Jack is notorious for the economy of expression and intent revealed in his catchphrase "Drink! Feck! Arse! Girls!" Their superior Bishop Brennan also has skeletons in his closet. In one episode it is revealed that he has a mistress and a son. This satirical shaft seems to refer to the real-life scandal surrounding Eamon Casey, former Bishop of Galway, whose domestic circumstances were similar to Bishop Brennan's.

=== South Park ===
The Catholic League for Religious and Civil Rights condemned the "Bloody Mary" episode of South Park for its treatment of the Virgin Mary. They demanded an apology to Roman Catholics and that the episode "be permanently retired and not be made available on DVD." In particular, they also demanded that Joseph A. Califano, Jr., a member of Viacom's (the parent of Comedy Central) board of directors and a practicing Catholic, issue his own statement of condemnation. Califano did later release a statement calling the episode an "appalling and disgusting portrayal of the Virgin Mary", and pledged to have it reviewed by Viacom's president and CEO, Tom Freston. Bishop William Skylstad, president of the United States Conference of Catholic Bishops, sent a letter to Freston saying the network showed "extreme insensitivity" when it aired the episode. When Comedy Central re-aired all the episodes from South Park's Fall 2005 season on December 28, 2005, "Bloody Mary" was noticeably absent from the broadcast. Comedy Central responded to e-mail inquiries about the fate of the episode with the assurance that "Bloody Mary" has not been retired and would not be pulled from the DVD release. However, screen captures from the episode are still missing on Comedy Central's press site and the South Park section of comedycentral.com.

In a 2006 interview with Nightline, South Park co-creator Matt Stone said when asked if he felt more sympathy (if any) for Catholics (for Bloody Mary) or Scientologists (for the episode Trapped in the Closet, another Season 9 episode regarding religion that had been temporarily pulled from re-runs for insensitivity), he said his sympathy lay with the Catholics.

== Film ==
=== Buñuel ===
Luis Buñuel was a fierce critic of the perceived pretension and hypocrisy of the Roman Catholic Church. Many of his most famous films demonstrate this:

Un chien andalou (1929): A man drags pianos, upon which are piled several priests, among other things.
L'Âge d'Or (1930): A bishop is thrown out a window, and in the final scene one of the culprits of the 120 days of Sodom by Marquis de Sade is portrayed by an actor dressed in a way that he would be recognized as Jesus.
Ensayo de un crimen (1955): A man dreams of murdering his wife while she's praying in bed dressed all in white.
Simon of the Desert (1965): The devil tempts the saint by taking the form of a naughty, bare-breasted little girl singing and showing off her legs. At the end of the film, the saint abandons his ascetic life to hang out in a jazz club.
Nazarin (1959): The pious lead character wreaks ruin through his attempts at charity.
Viridiana (1961): A well-meaning young nun tries unsuccessfully to help the poor.
The Milky Way (1969): Two men travel the ancient pilgrimage road to Santiago de Compostela and meet embodiments of various heresies along the way. One dreams of anarchists shooting the Pope.

=== Robbie Coltrane ===
Robbie Coltrane portrays a naive priest who is made Pope in a corrupt mafia-controlled Vatican in the comedy film The Pope Must Die (1991). The plot alludes to the Roberto Calvi scandal and the Pope John Paul I conspiracy theories. Coltrane had previously donned clerical vestments in Nuns on the Run (1990). Earlier in his career Coltrane had also created a television comedy character known as 'Mason Boyne' - a spoof Scottish Presbyterian Orangeman - who was rabidly anti-Catholic to the point of painting over the leaves on plants with orange paint.

== Other ==
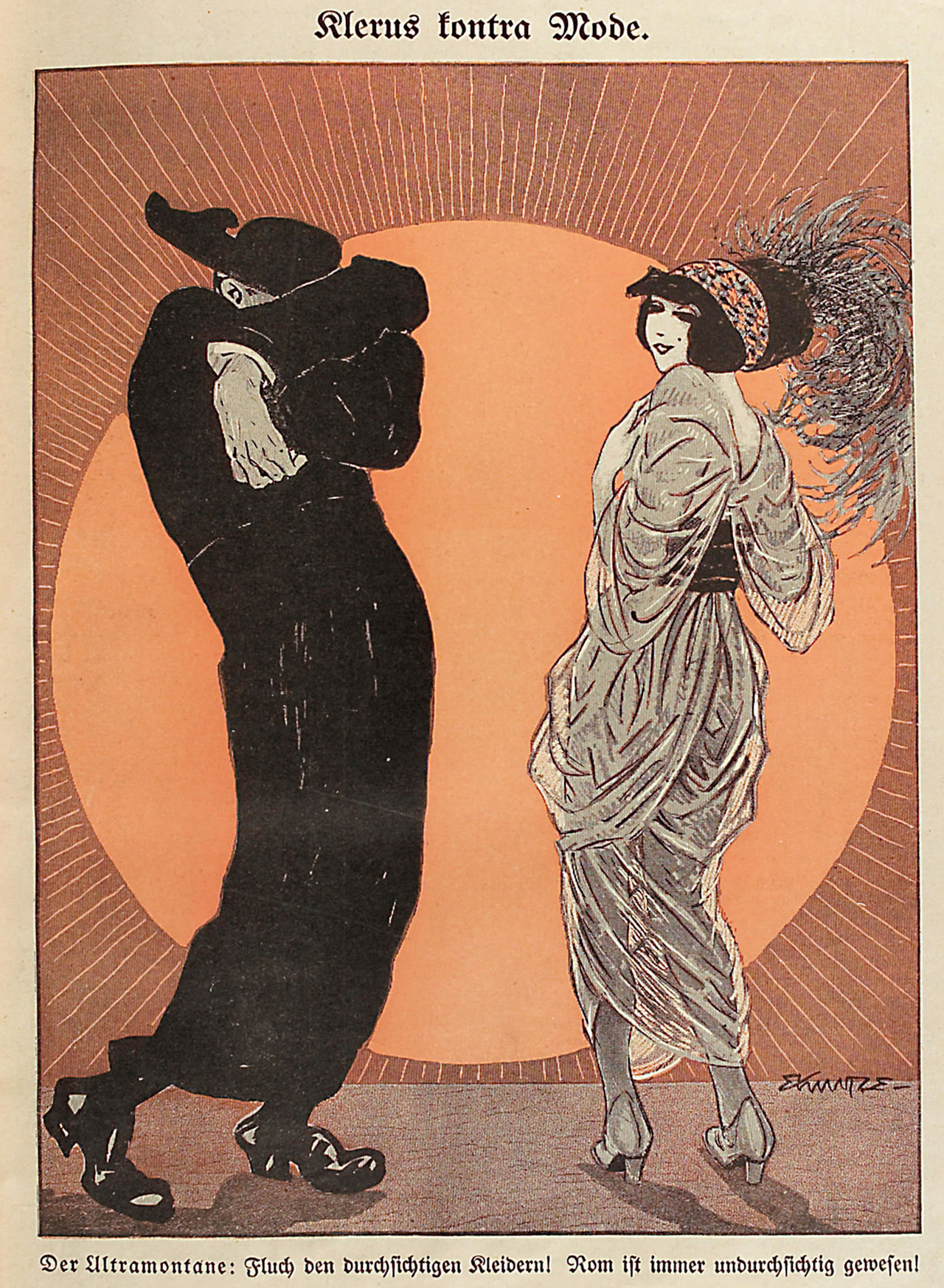
A 1914 caricature by Edmund Kuntze titled Klerus kontra Mode, "Clergy versus fashion".

=== Sisters of Perpetual Indulgence ===
The Sisters of Perpetual Indulgence, an international group of mostly gay men who frequently mock Catholicism and promote safe sex and AIDS awareness, hold anniversary parties and parades on Easter Sunday. Their use of Catholic symbolism is considered offensive.

=== Tom Lehrer ===
Tom Lehrer, a well known humorist in the 1960s (and, coincidentally, a Harvard professor of Mathematics), gently satirised the Catholic Church in his song 'The Vatican Rag' which he claimed was an appropriate response to the conclusions of the Second Vatican Council as published in 1965.

== See also ==
- The Bible and humor
- Religion in The Simpsons
- Microsoft acquisition hoax, an Internet joke suggesting that the information technology company Microsoft had acquired the Catholic Church.
