= Jeff Smith (Mississippi politician) =

American attorney and politician

Member of the Mississippi House of Representatives from the 39th district
- In office January 1992 – January 2020
- Preceded by: Bruce J. Hanson
- Succeeded by: Dana McLean

Personal details
- Born: December 6, 1949 (age 76) Columbus, Mississippi, U.S.
- Party: Republican (2011–present); Democratic (before 2011)
- Education: Mississippi State University (BS); University of Mississippi (JD)

Jeffrey C. Smith (born December 6, 1949) is an American attorney and politician who served as a Republican member of the Mississippi House of Representatives from 1992 to 2020.

== Early life and education ==
Smith was born and raised in Columbus, Mississippi. He earned a Bachelor of Science degree from Mississippi State University and a Juris Doctor from the University of Missouri School of Law.

== Career ==
Smith served as a prosecutor for Lowndes County from 1980 to 1989. He was elected to the Mississippi House of Representatives in November 1991 and assumed office in January 1992. Smith switched from the Democratic Party to the Republicans on June 1, 2011, later explaining that he decided to become a Republican because the Republicans had recruited a candidate to run against him in the upcoming election for House speaker.

Following Speaker William McCoy's decision not to run for re-election in 2011, Smith had been considered a possible frontrunner for the speakership. He lost the 2008 speaker election, in which he was supported by the Republicans; by some Democrats who (like Smith) have since bolted the party; and by Republican governor Haley Barbour by a single vote. The House voted on a new speaker at the start of the 2012 session. A narrow margin of power for either party following the election could force lawmakers to form a coalition in order to elect a new speaker. In the end, however, Philip Gunn was elected speaker without opposition.

== Elections ==
=== 2007 ===
On November 6, 2007 Smith was re-elected in District 39. He defeated James Samuel in the Democratic primary election and ran unopposed in the general election.

=== 2011 ===
Smith was unopposed for re-election (as a Republican) in the 2011 election for Mississippi House of Representatives District 39. He defeated Jack Larmour in the Republican primary on August 2, 2011. No Democratic candidates filed to run for election, and he was re-elected in general election on November 8, 2011.

== Personal life ==
Smith is president of Swim Columbus and is a deacon of the First Baptist Church in Columbus. He is married to Laura Terrell and they have a son named Corky.

Political offices
Preceded by Bruce J. Hanson	Mississippi House of Representatives District 39; 1992–present	Succeeded by NA
