= Edward Blackmon Jr. =

American politician and attorney

Member of the Mississippi House of Representatives from the 57th district
- In office January 3, 1984 – January 2, 2024
- Preceded by: Robert L. Everett III
- Succeeded by: Lawrence Blackmon
- In office January 29, 1979 – January 8, 1980
- Preceded by: Milton Case
- Succeeded by: Robert L. Everett III

Personal details
- Born: July 21, 1947 (age 79) Canton, Mississippi, U.S.
- Party: Democratic
- Spouse: Barbara Martin (m. 1986)
- Children: Janessa, Madison, Bradford, and Lawrence
- Education: Tougaloo College; George Washington University; Emory University
- Occupation: Lawyer; politician

Edward Blackmon Jr. (born July 21, 1947) is an American lawyer and politician. A member of the Democratic Party, he served continuously in the Mississippi House of Representatives from 1983 to 2024, representing the 57th district. He previously served a term from 1979 to 1980. Blackmon has served as chair of the Legislative Black Caucus, president of the Magnolia Bar Association, and is presently an emeritus trustee of Tougaloo College’s board of trustees. He was named by The National Law Journal as one of the Nation’s Top 10 Litigators in 2002 and 2013.
