= Jason White (politician) =

American politician

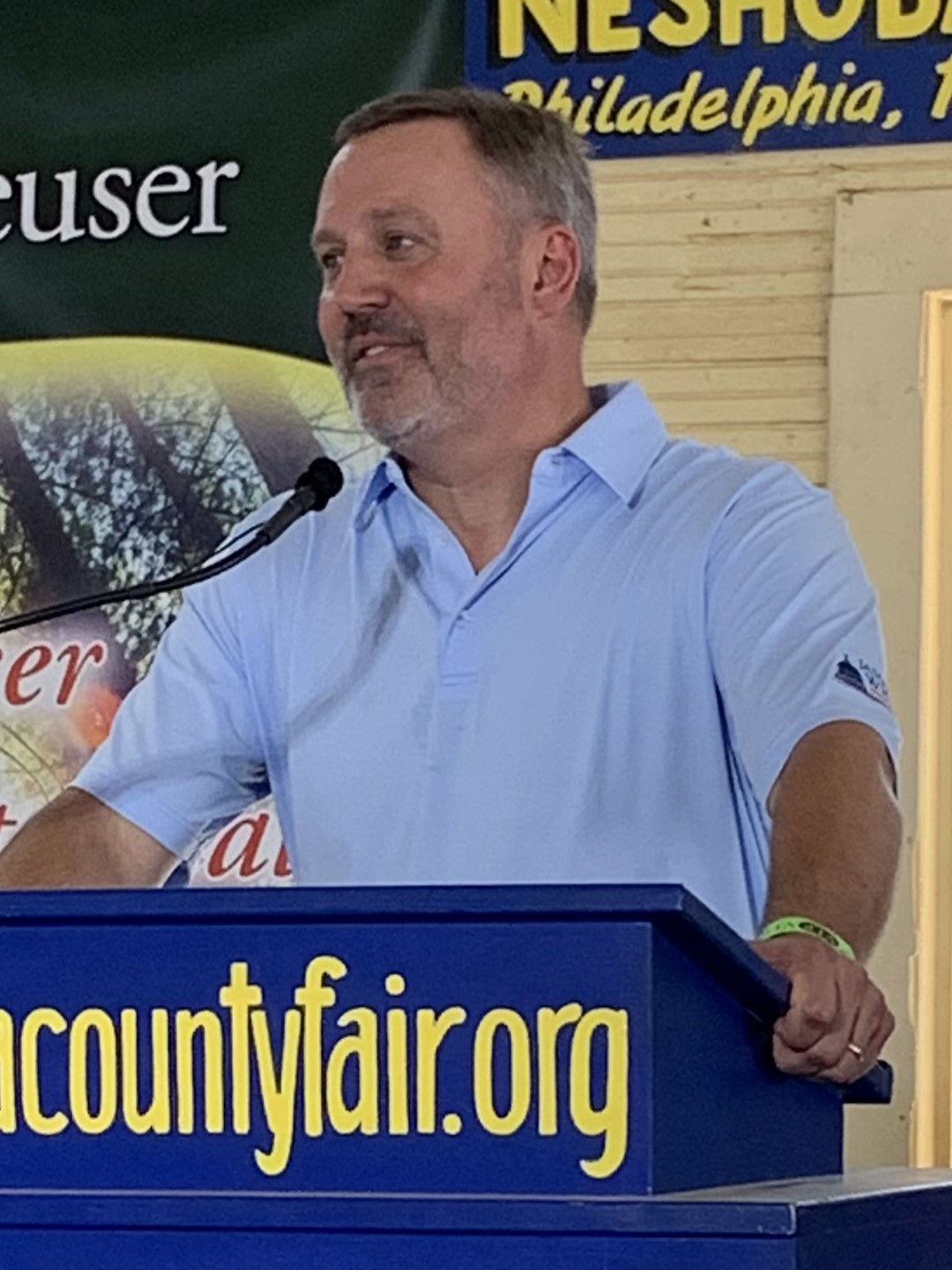

62nd Speaker of the Mississippi House of Representatives
- Incumbent
- Assumed office January 2, 2024
- Preceded by: Philip Gunn

Speaker pro tempore of the Mississippi House of Representatives
- In office January 7, 2020 – January 2, 2024
- Preceded by: Greg Snowden
- Succeeded by: Manly Barton

Member of the Mississippi House of Representatives from the 48th district
- Incumbent
- Assumed office January 3, 2012
- Preceded by: Mary Stevens

Personal details
- Born: Jason Mark White; December 28, 1972 (age 53) Kosciusko, Mississippi
- Party: Democratic (until 2012); Republican (since 2012)
- Spouse: Jolynn McLellan
- Education: Mississippi College (BA, JD)

Jason Mark White (born December 28, 1972) is an American politician. He is the Speaker of the Mississippi House of Representatives, being elected in 2024. He represents the 48th district, being first elected in 2011. He is a member of the Republican party.

== Early life ==
Jason White was born on December 28, 1972. He graduated from Mississippi College, receiving his B.A. He later graduated from the Mississippi College School of Law, receiving his J.D.

== Career ==
White is an attorney from Holmes County in the town of West.

He is the president of the Attala County Bar Association. He is a member of the West Historical and Preservation Society and Attala County Farmers Co-op. He serves on the board of directors for the Attala County Forestry Association.

=== Politics ===
Since 2012, White has represented the 48th district in the Mississippi House of Representatives, which encompasses parts of Attala, Carroll, Holmes, and Leake counties.

In 2011, White ran to succeed former Rep. Mary Ann Stevens, also of West, who was a conservative Democrat for the 48th district in the Mississippi House of Representatives. He won in the Democratic Primary against two other contenders and went unchallenged in the general election. He was elected as a Democrat, but switched to Republican in December 2012 after determining his social and budget issues were more in line with the Republican party. He won in a contested general election in 2015 with 69% of the vote, and won uncontested general races in 2019 and 2023.

He voted in favor of changing the Mississippi state flag.

He became the 62nd House speaker in 2024 following a unanimous vote from the other members. Prior, he served as House speaker pro tempore under House Speaker Philip Gunn. As speaker, he runs the chamber, appoints representatives to committees, and determines which legislation is prioritized. He emphasized public school funding reform as one of his objectives in his first speech as speaker.

== Personal life ==
He is married to Jolynn McLellan and is a Baptist. He has three children.

Mississippi House of Representatives
Preceded by Greg Snowden	Speaker pro tempore of the Mississippi House of Representatives; 2020–2024	Succeeded by Manly Barton
Political offices
Preceded by Philip Gunn	Speaker of the Mississippi House of Representatives; 2024–present	Incumbent
