= Kenneth Wayne Jones =

American businessman and Democratic politician

Member of the Mississippi State Senate from the 21st district
- In office January 2008 – January 2016
- Preceded by: Joseph C. Thomas
- Succeeded by: Barbara Blackmon

Personal details
- Born: February 3, 1966 (age 60) Canton, Mississippi, U.S.
- Party: Democratic
- Children: 2

Kenneth Wayne Jones (born February 3, 1966) is an American businessman and Democratic politician. He was a member of the Mississippi State Senate from 2008 to 2016, and an Alderman of Canton, Mississippi, from 1997 to 2008.

== Biography ==
Kenneth Wayne Jones was born on February 3, 1966, in Canton, Mississippi. He graduated from Canton High School, Jackson State University, and Millsaps College. He joined the United States Army Reserve, where he served for 24 years before retiring as a Sergeant First Class. Before entering politics, Jones worked as a violence prevention counselor at Tougaloo College.

=== Political career ===
In May 1997, Jones was elected to serve as an alderman of Canton, Mississippi. He served in the office of alderman for twelve years.

In 2007, Jones was elected unopposed as a Democrat to represent the 21st District, comprising Attala, Holmes, Madison, and Yazoo Counties, in the Mississippi State Senate for the 2008–2012 term. In 2011, Jones ran for re-election in the same district and defeated Republican Loren Ross. During the 2012–2016 term, Jones was the chairman of the Interstate and Federal Cooperation Committee. Two times during Jones's Senate service, he was elected Chairman of the Mississippi Legislative Black Caucus. In July 2014, while serving in the Senate, Jones was appointed to also serve on Canton's Municipal Utility Board. However, the state attorney general ruled that Jones could not serve concurrently in the legislative branch and executive branch, and mandated Jones to resign from the utility board, which he did on August 29, 2014. Jones ran for re-election to the Senate in 2015, but narrowly lost the Democratic primary to former 12-year state senator Barbara Blackmon, who received 4832 votes, only 34 more than Jones' 4798 votes. Jones served as a County Administrator of Hinds County from 2020 until his retirement at the end of December 2023. In 2024, Jones was appointed the Kappa Alpha Psi fraternity's Political Action Chairman for the Southwestern Province.

== Personal life ==
Jones is a member of the Freemasons. He is married to the former Bobby Ann Jenkins, and they have two children.
