= William Tracy Arnold =

American politician from the state of Mississippi

Member of the Mississippi House of Representatives from the 3rd district
- Incumbent
- Assumed office January 3, 2012
- Preceded by: William J. McCoy

Personal details
- Born: William Tracy Arnold; February 14, 1969 (age 57) Prentiss County, Mississippi, U.S.
- Party: Republican
- Children: 3
- Education: Life International Bible Institute and Seminary (DD)
- Occupation: Pastor

William Tracy Arnold (born February 14, 1969) is an American politician, representing the 3rd district in the Mississippi House of Representatives since 2012.

== Early life and education ==
Arnold was born in Prentiss County, Mississippi on February 14, 1969, where he attended New Site High School. In 1998, he received a Doctorate of Divinity in Theology from the Life International Bible Institute and Seminary. He serves as a pastor for The Vineyard Church, which is located in the 3rd district in Booneville.

== Political career ==
In 2007, Arnold ran an unsuccessful campaign against then-incumbent Representative and Speaker of the House William J. McCoy, receiving 38% of the vote.

=== 2011–2015 ===
In 2011, Arnold ran for election to the 3rd district following news that McCoy would not seek reelection. He ran unopposed in the Republican primary and ran against Democratic contender Tommy Cadle, where he won in the general election with 53% of the vote to Cadle's 47%. He assumed office on January 3, 2012.

Running as a Republican, Arnold flipped the seat, as McCoy was a Democrat.

=== 2015–2019 ===
For the 2015 election, Arnold faced Democratic candidate Lauren Childers. Childers, a daughter of former United States House Representative Travis Childers, won in the Democratic primary with 68.5% of the vote. She lost in the general election, receiving around 43% of the vote.

In 2016, Arnold was a cosponsor of the controversial Religious Liberty Accommodations Act.

As of 2021, Mississippi is the only state that doesn't have a law supporting equal pay. Arnold, who is a supporter of pay equity, spearheaded a bill to establish equal pay for equal work as a state law in 2018. The bill failed to garner enough support for it to pass.

=== 2019–present ===
Arnold held his seat against Democratic contender Janis Patterson, winning nearly 78% of the vote.

In 2020, Arnold sponsored two bills to restrict Internet pornography, with his reasoning being to protect children and to help stop human trafficking. Both bills died in committee.

For the 2021 session, Arnold chairs the Interstate Corporation committee and is a member on the following others: Agriculture, Appropriations, Banking and Financial Services, Energy, Insurance, and Transportation.

== Political positions ==
During his election campaign in 2011, Arnold voiced support for additional funding for education.

In 2020, Arnold voted no to a resolution on changing the Mississippi State flag.

Arnold describes himself as "staunchly pro-life". He supports the National Rifle Association of America and Farm Bureau.

== Personal life ==
Arnold is married and has two children. He and his family are of Christian faith.
