= Joseph C. Thomas =

American politician

Member of the Mississippi Senate from the 22nd district
- Incumbent
- Assumed office January 7, 2020
- Preceded by: Eugene Clarke

Member of the Mississippi Senate from the 21st district
- In office January 2, 2004 – January 1, 2008
- Preceded by: Barbara Blackmon
- Succeeded by: Kenneth Jones

Personal details
- Born: Joseph C. Thomas, Sr. June 25, 1949 (age 77) Yazoo City, Mississippi, U.S.
- Party: Democratic
- Children: 3
- Education: Jackson State University (BBA)

Joseph C. Thomas Sr. (born June 25, 1949) is an American politician, serving in the Mississippi Senate from the 21st district from 2004 to 2008 and from the 22nd district since 2020.

== Early life and education ==
Thomas was born in Yazoo City, where he attended N. D. Taylor High School. He graduated from Jackson State University with a bachelor's in business administration.

== Career ==
After graduating, Thomas began working at a AmSouth Bank, where he eventually retired as vice-president after 30 years of service. Governor Ray Mabus appointed him to the first Real Estate Appraisal Board in Mississippi in 1980; he served till 1985. He was later appointed by Governor Ronnie Musgrove to serve as a board member on the Strategic Economic Development and Planning Committee. Around the same time, he was appointed as chairman of Yazoo City Public Schools and chairman of the Yazoo City Public Service Commission. As of 2010, he is the chairman of the board of directors for Bountiful Blessings Broadcasting, Incorporated, which hosts the local radio station WBBP. He is the executive vice president/treasurer for the Friends of Amistad Research Center, which is located on the Tulane University campus in New Orleans.

Thomas ran for election to the Mississippi Senate in 2003, running for the 21st district. He won the Democratic primary with 19.07%, the Democratic runoff with 50.44% and the general election with 70.45% of the vote; he assumed office on January 2, 2004. He ran for reelection in 2007, but lost in the Democratic primary with 48.82% of the vote. In 2012, legislative redistricting occurred, leading Thomas to run for election against Sen. Buck Clarke for the 22nd district in 2015, which he lost by eight points. In early 2019, a federal judge ruled for a redrawing of the district, claiming that it "diluted black voting power." With redrawn districts, he secured 32.6% of the Democratic primary vote, 60.7% in the Democratic runoff, and 52.4% in the general election.

For the 2020-24 Senate term, he is the vice-chair for the Interstate and Federal Cooperation Committee and is a member on the following committees: Business and Financial Institutions; Drug Policy; Ethics; Finance; Forestry; Insurance; Judiciary, Division B; and State Library.

He has served as a former board member for the American Public Power Association and the National Development Foundation for Jackson State University. He is a former member of the Yazoo County Fair, National Conference of State Legislators, Education Committee for the Southern Conference of State Legislators. He is a board member for the Yazoo County Fellowship of Christian Athletes, vice president for the D.W. Wilburn Scholarship Foundation, and the senior deacon for Chapel Hill Missionary Baptist Church.

== Political positions ==
In March 2020, as part of the Senate Democratic Caucus, he endorsed Joe Biden for president.

He voted for changing the Mississippi state flag.

== Personal life ==
He has three children and is of Baptist faith.
