= Greg Snowden =

American attorney and politician

Speaker pro tempore of the Mississippi House of Representatives
- In office January 3, 2012 – January 7, 2020
- Preceded by: J. P. Compretta
- Succeeded by: Jason White

Member of the Mississippi House of Representatives from the 83rd district
- In office 2000 – January 2020
- Succeeded by: Billy Adam Calvert

Personal details
- Born: Meridian, Mississippi, U.S.
- Party: Republican
- Education: University of Alabama, Tuscaloosa (BA); Vanderbilt University (JD)

Elton Gregory Snowden is an American attorney who served in the Mississippi House of Representatives. A Republican, he served from 2012 to 2020 as speaker pro tempore of the Mississippi House of Representatives, representing district 83.

Mississippi House of Representatives
Preceded by J. P. Compretta	Speaker pro tempore of the Mississippi House of Representatives; 2012–2020	Succeeded by Jason White
