= Contraception Begins at Erection Act =

Proposed reproductive heath legislation

Contraception Begins at Erection Act is a 2025 Mississippi bill proposed by Mississippi State Senator Bradford Blackmon that would make it unlawful for a person to "discharge genetic material without the intent to fertilize an embryo." The proposed bill would impose a $1,000 fine for first-time offenders, $5,000 fine for a second offense, and $10,000 fine for further offenses. The bill died in committee on February 4, 2025.

Blackmon stated he proposed the bill to "point out the double standards in legislation" and "[bring] the man’s role into the conversation" noting how "People can get up in arms and call it absurd but I can’t say that bothers me." Canada's National Post described the bill as "satirical" and "a provocative response to recent restrictions on women’s reproductive rights", citing the Supreme Court's overturning of Roe v. Wade as an example.

Following the introduction of the bill, Blackmon received death threats and subsequently stated that the bill was made in jest.

== Conception Begins at Erection Act ==
In Feb 2025, Ohio House of Representatives Anita Somani and Tristan Rader stated they would introduce a similar bill dubbed "Conception Begins at Erection Act."

== See also ==
- Every Sperm Is Sacred
- Natalism
