= List of flags of Mississippi =

This is a list of flags of Mississippi, both historic and current, and regional flags.

== State flag ==
Flag	Date	Use	Description
	1911–present	State and civil flag	A solid blue field with the coat-of-arms of the state, the pelican tearing its breast to feed its young, in white in the center, with a ribbon beneath, also in white, containing in blue the motto of the state, "Union, Justice and Confidence", the whole showing as below. The design...shall include an appropriate display of three drops of blood. 7:11 aspect ratio.

== Military flags ==
Flag	Date	Use	Description
		Mississippi Army National Guard	A blue field, defaced with the shoulder sleeve insignia of the Mississippi Army National Guard.
		Mississippi ARNG 66th Troop Command	A tricolor of blue-maize-blue, defaced with the shoulder sleeve emblem of the Mississippi Army National Guard, with a ribbon saying "SIXTY-SIXTH TROOP COMMAND"

== City flags ==
Flag	Date	Use	Description
		Flag of Jackson, Mississippi	A white cross on a green field, charged with a yellow-bordered blue disc with a yellow five-pointed star contained within it.
	2024	Flag of Gulfport	A field of "National Flag Blue", charged with a disc of "Spanish Yellow", within the disc a blue anchor motif, surrounded on the top by seven white five-pointed stars.

== Historic flags ==
Flag	Date	Use	Description
	1861-1865	State flag	Flag of white ground, a magnolia tree in the centre, a blue field in the upper left hand corner with a white star in the centre, the Flag to be finished with a red border and a red fringe at the extremity of the Flag.
	1861-1865	State flag variant	The 1861 state flag, with the red instead only on the fly, instead of bordering the state flag.
	1894-1996	State flag	A horizontal tricolor of equal blue-white-red stripes, with a square Confederate battle flag in the canton.
	1996-2020	State flag	The 1894 flag after standardization.
	2020	Bicentennial Banner	A horizontal tricolor of equal stripes, of blue-white-red, charged with the State Seal of Mississippi.

== Proposed flags ==
Flag	Date	Use	Description
	2001	Proposed flag	A horizontal tricolor of equal stripes, of blue-white-red, with a blue canton, with 20 stars.
	2015	Hospitality/Stennis flag	A vertical tricolor of unequal stripes, of red-white-red, with a blue star in the center, surrounded by a circle of 19 stars. The white stripe is wider than the red ones.
