= William J. McCoy (Mississippi politician) =

American politician (1942–2019)

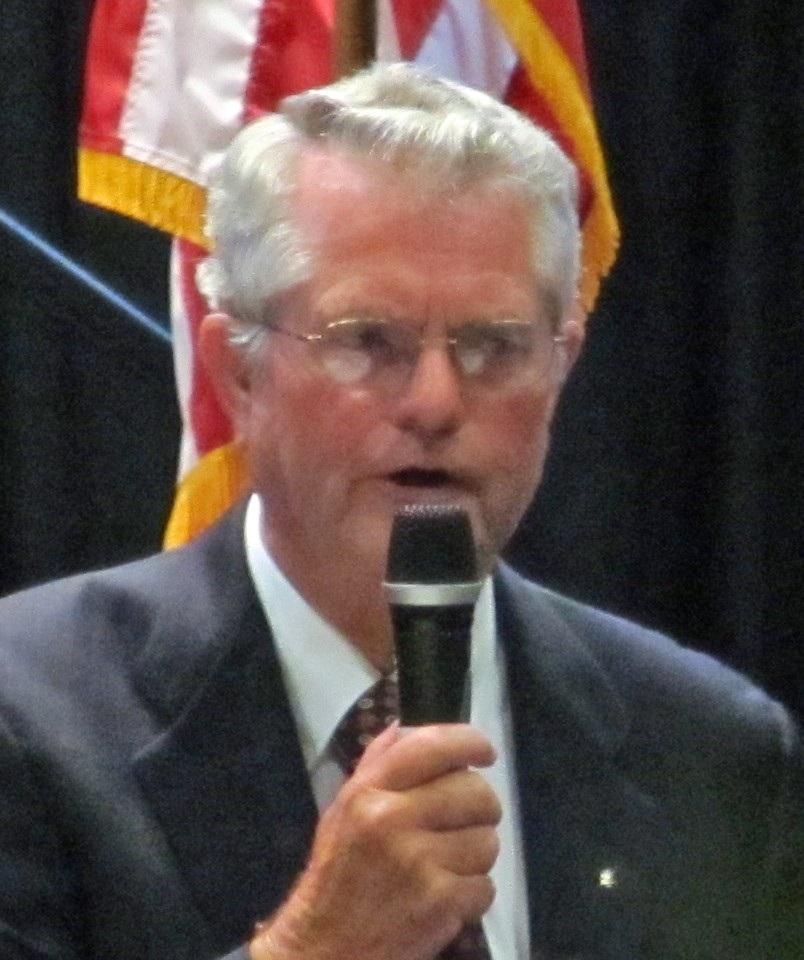
- McCoy in 2011

60th Speaker of the Mississippi House of Representatives
- In office January 6, 2004 – January 3, 2012
- Preceded by: Tim Ford
- Succeeded by: Philip Gunn

Member of the Mississippi House of Representatives from the 3rd district
- In office January 1980 – January 3, 2012
- Preceded by: Don Chambliss; Ralph H. Doxey; Gene Manning
- Succeeded by: William Tracy Arnold

Personal details
- Born: August 14, 1942 Booneville, Mississippi, U.S.
- Died: November 12, 2019 (aged 77) Tupelo, Mississippi, U.S.
- Party: Democratic
- Education: Northeast Mississippi Community College; Mississippi State University

William J. McCoy (August 14, 1942 – November 12, 2019) was an American farmer and Democratic politician from Rienzi, Mississippi. He was the Speaker of the House of Representatives of the State of Mississippi.

== Background ==
McCoy was born August 14, 1942, in Booneville, attended Northeast Mississippi Junior College, and graduated from Mississippi State University. He has worked as a vocational agriculture teacher and as a loan officer for the Farmers Home Administration, as well as a school auditor for the Mississippi State Department of Audit. He also farmed.

== House of Representatives ==
McCoy became a member of the House in 1980, and was elected Speaker in 2004. In 2008, he faced (and beat) a challenge by conservative fellow Democrat, later Republican Jeff Smith of Columbus, who was supported by the Republicans in the House and by Republican governor Haley Barbour.

On May 25, 2011, McCoy announced that he would not seek re-election to the State House.

== Personal life ==
McCoy married Edith Leatherwood. He was a Baptist, Freemason, and a member of the Farm Bureau. He served as a member of the Board of Trustees of Northeast Mississippi Community College. He died on November 12, 2019, at the North Mississippi Medical Center in Tupelo, Mississippi. He was 77 years old.

== Sources ==
- Home page
- Project VoteSmart: "Representative William J. 'Billy' McCoy (MS)"
