= The Bible and humor =

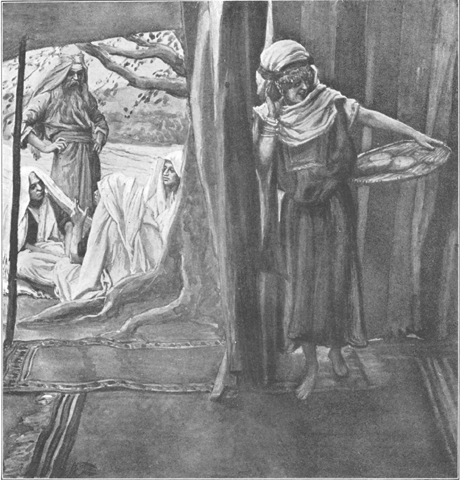
Sarah, 90 years old, hears that she will have a child, and laughs at the idea, from the Book of Genesis. James Tissot, c. 1900

The Bible and humor is a topic of Biblical criticism concerned with the question of whether parts of the Bible were intended to convey humor in any style. Historically, this topic has not received much attention, but modern scholars generally agree that humor can be found in biblical texts.

== Scholarly assessment ==
Finding humor in the Bible, for those who hold reverence toward the Bible, can be hindered by that seriousness, but it can be difficult for anyone to pick up on, because humor does not translate well from culture to culture or from language to language. It is also difficult to recognize humor in written form. The age of the texts makes it difficult to be sure that what readers today are interpreting as humor was intended as humor by the author. Finding humor in the Bible requires a broad eclectic definition of humor and some awareness of literary types of humor such as satire, farce, parody, irony and so on. Therefore, the vast majority of Bible interpreters over the last 1,500 years have not only not detected humor in the Bible, they have often discounted or even disdained the possibility of humor in the Bible.

Professor Yehuda T. Radday notes that some scholars have flat out denied that humor in the Bible exists. He references a 1984 conference in Israel on the subject of Jewish humor, where no attention was given to humor in the Bible. Radday goes on to say "it is a widespread misconception that the Bible is lacking in humor."

Scholars like Steven C. Walker, a professor of literature, and Howard R. Macy, a professor of religion, claim humor is prevalent in the Bible. Macy says that "if we think that humor in the Bible mostly looks like stand-up comedy or telling jokes, we won't see much of that." Anthony J. Perotta, priest and professor at Fuller Seminary, argues that:

... humor as we know it today is probably not part of the Bible any more than love (and marriage, etc.) as we know it today is a feature of the Bible. But this is a minor point, maybe even trivial and pedantic. ... The ancient Hebrews loved and married—and joked—no doubt, in a different idiom than "we" do, but they still engaged in such activities and we can speak about those activities without being anachronistic or solipsistic

Professor of Jewish theology and Near Eastern studies Leonard Greenspoon says, "In sum, biblical humor is certainly not stand-up comedy nor is it especially cerebral either. Rather, it is participatory and fully in keeping with the overall themes and emphases of the Hebrew Bible." Author David A. Peters states that he finds over a thousand "humorous lines and stories" in the Bible.

There is general agreement that the kind of humor that can be found in the Bible becomes apparent when the Bible is viewed as literature. Rev. Marion Daniel Shutter asserts we would find genuine wit if, in literature other than the Bible, we came across sentences such as that found in Proverbs 26:17: Interfering in someone else's argument is as foolish as yanking a dog's ears. He says, "When Isaiah characterizes certain ones as 'mighty to drink wine and men of strength to mingle strong drink,' does he not use essentially the same reproach Prince Hal fastened upon Falstaff, 'Wherin is he good but to taste sack and drink it?" Macy says the Bible authors use dark humor, satire, a great deal of wit, and are particularly fond of the dry humor that goes with exaggeration. Walker adds, "The humor of the Bible is deadpan. It sneaks up on you."

When discussing biblical humor scholars generally agree humor is often in the situation itself. Macy gives the examples of Sarah having Isaac at the age of ninety, and the Messiah turning up in a barn. Macy says "The Bible gives us tale after tale of comic reversals and narrow escapes." He says "mischievous exploits", names and name changes, literary plays on words, exaggeration, and the unexpected: a surprising word, an unexpected phrase, or an abrupt change of direction are what the Bible uses to convey wit and humor. According to Macy, the Book of Proverbs includes funny images and word-play while "trickster themes also bring surprise and laughter." Professor of Biblical Literature J. William Whedbee says the biblical authors use "humorous juxtaposition" where things seem funny because they're together: for example, short and tall, fat and thin, irony and paradox. Those scholars who do find humor in the Bible agree the odd, awkward, or absurd such as mismatches in character and actions, are examples of how the Bible uses humor. "Balaam the 'seer' who doesn't 'see' or 'know' what's going on, and his donkey who both sees and knows," is an example of this type of wit and humor in the Bible.

== Hebrew Bible (Old Testament) ==
=== Genesis ===
Macy, Walker, M. D. Shutter, and other scholars contend that the Book of Genesis has several stories that offer humor through absurdity, trickery, surprises and reversals. Macy says that in speaking of humor in the Bible, he usually begins with asking how it might feel to personally get the message Abraham and Sarah received, putting them into the absurd situation of a ninety-year-old having a baby. He argues that the Biblical author shows that the situation is replete with humor: "Abraham laughs, Sarah laughs, everybody else laughs, and they name the baby 'laughter' or He-laughs [Isaac Yitzack]."

Humor in Genesis, Macy says, includes "Both Abraham and Isaac trying to pass off their wives as their sisters, [however] translations of Genesis 26:8 range from [Isaac and his 'sister'] "laughing together" to "caressing" or "fondling" to "making love" giving evidence of Isaac's 'savvy' in pulling off the lie. Jacob and Laban make deals with each other that make a reader cringe. In Genesis 18, the topic is serious but bargaining with God looks a lot like buying a used car."

Walker says Genesis contains several "odd couples" that contrast and complement each other like 'Laurel and Hardy': Jacob and Esau, Abraham and Sarah, Abraham and Lot, Jacob and Laban, and others. He adds, "Bible characters learn a lot about their own 'dark sides' by those contrasts." The pattern of reversal of fundamental motifs such as primogeniture are evidence of humor according to Walker. He references 12 incidents in Genesis of younger sons getting the better of their elder brothers.

Greenspoon offers Genesis 4 as an example of Biblical humor using ironic wordplay with names. After murdering his brother and attempting to shift the blame, Cain is condemned to wander ceaselessly, but when he complains, God agrees to let him settle in the land of Nod. Greenspoon says, "The root of the Hebrew verb 'to wander' is n-w-d and "the proper name 'Nod' derives from the same root as the verb 'to wander'... What sort of settling is Cain likely to experience in a land whose very name connotes (constant) wandering?"

=== Exodus ===
Greenspoon says Aaron's response to getting caught after making the golden calf is humorous. "Does Aaron come clean when confronted by his enraged brother...? Not exactly. He does attempt to shift blame—"You know this people is bent on evil". He also admits to asking the people for their gold, at the same time notably truncating the scope of his original request... Even though the biblical text had earlier narrated in some detail the active role he took ... [he says]: 'They gave it to me', Aaron concludes, 'and I hurled it into the fire and out came this calf'."

=== Numbers ===
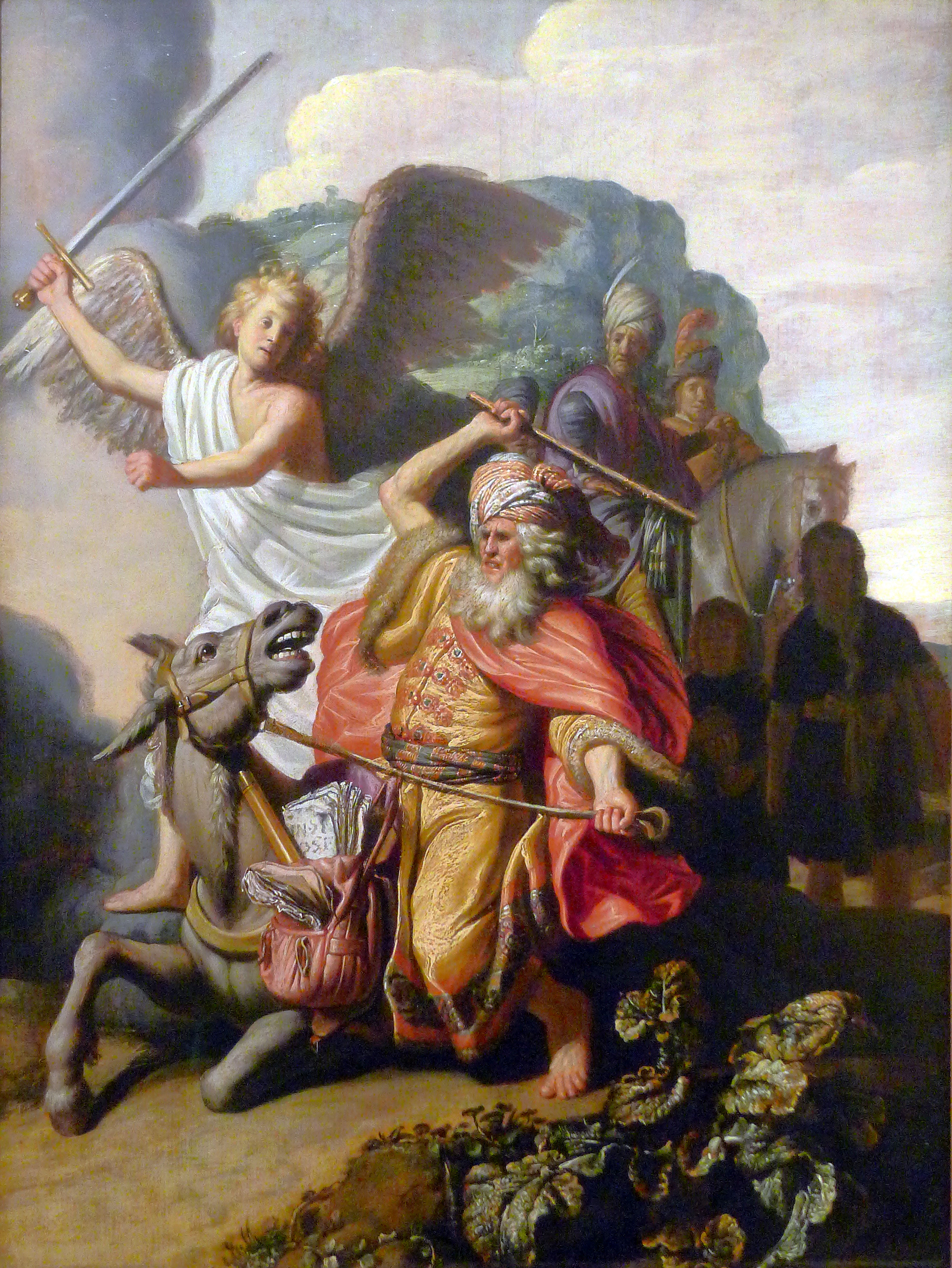
Balaam and the Ass, Rembrandt 1626

Anthony J. Perrota and others find plenty of humor in the story of Balaam and his talking donkey in the Book of Numbers. Balaam is repeatedly asked by king Balak to curse the Israelites, but Balaam can only bless them, making the king increasingly angry. Petrotta explains that humor exposes the pretensions of a culture, and that Balak is certainly drawn as a caricature of a monarch. The story is set up in terms of threes—"three people, three incidents, etc.—that is required for many types of jokes: "A prophet, a priest and a prostitute die on the same day and came before St.Peter...where the third element breaks the pattern" and provides the joke. "Balaam is risible; Balak is pitiful. ... Their ridiculous stance is increasingly absurd with each stupidly unresponsive reaction. ... We laugh at Balaam for not seeing, but all the time the Israelites have not seen either, both what God has done above, or the consequences of what they are doing below."

=== Judges ===
Shutter finds humor in the Fable of the Trees (Judges 9). Abimelech maneuvered to have himself proclaimed king in Shechem, but Jotham believed he was unfit to rule and the people foolish to accept him. Jotham contrives a satire. "The trees went forth to anoint a king over them. They said to the olive tree, 'reign over us.' But the olive tree answered, ‘Should I give up my oil, by which both gods and humans are honored, to hold sway over the trees?’ Next, the trees said to the fig tree, ‘Come and be our king.’ But the fig tree replied, ‘Should I give up my fruit, so good and sweet, to hold sway over the trees?’ Then the trees said to the vine, ‘Come and be our king.’ But the vine answered, 'Should I give up my wine, which cheers both gods and humans, to hold sway over the trees?' Finally all the trees said to the thornbush, 'Come and be our king'. The thornbush said to the trees, 'If you really want to anoint me king over you, come and take refuge in my shade; but if not, then let fire come out of the thornbush and consume the cedars of Lebanon!'" Then Jotham left "for in that day, as in every subsequent age, there was no room for a satirist in the kingdom of an incompetent ruler".

Shutter also asserts that Samson is a humorous character, very similar to Ajax in Sophocles' play Ajax. Quoting Rev. A. G. L'Estrange in his History of English humor..., Shutter says: "He was an exaggeration of a not very uncommon type of man in which brute strength is joined to loose morals and whimsical fancy... We can only smile at his folly."

Greenspoon finds humor in the word play of the names and characteristics of two protagonists found in the account of the murder of the King of Moab in the second half of Judges 3. One of these characters is Ehud, a "left-handed man" from the tribe of Benjamin (Judg 3:15). "Such a description serves two functions here: first, as a play on words-—Ehud's tribe, Benjamin, literally means the son of the south, or right. (Ancient Israelites oriented themselves with the Mediterranean Sea behind them and East was straight ahead; so, the south was to their right.) Thus, it would not escape the notice of the reader that here was a "son of the south" or "the right hand" who was left-handed... Second, because Ehud was left-handed, he strapped his sword to his right thigh... the Moabite king's bodyguards, who would certainly have checked out anyone seeking admittance to their monarch, performed only a perfunctory check on Ehud, never thinking that the weapon would be on his right, rather than the expected left, thigh. It is especially the name of the Moabite king, Eglon, that would have immediately attracted the attention of an ancient reader ... Eglon comes from the same Hebrew root as the word for a fatted calf, often one prepared for sacrifice. And, of course, sacrifice is exactly what Eglon becomes at the hand of Ehud... biblical writers seemed to draw upon just such incidents to display what might be termed the wicked side of their humor."

=== 1 Samuel ===
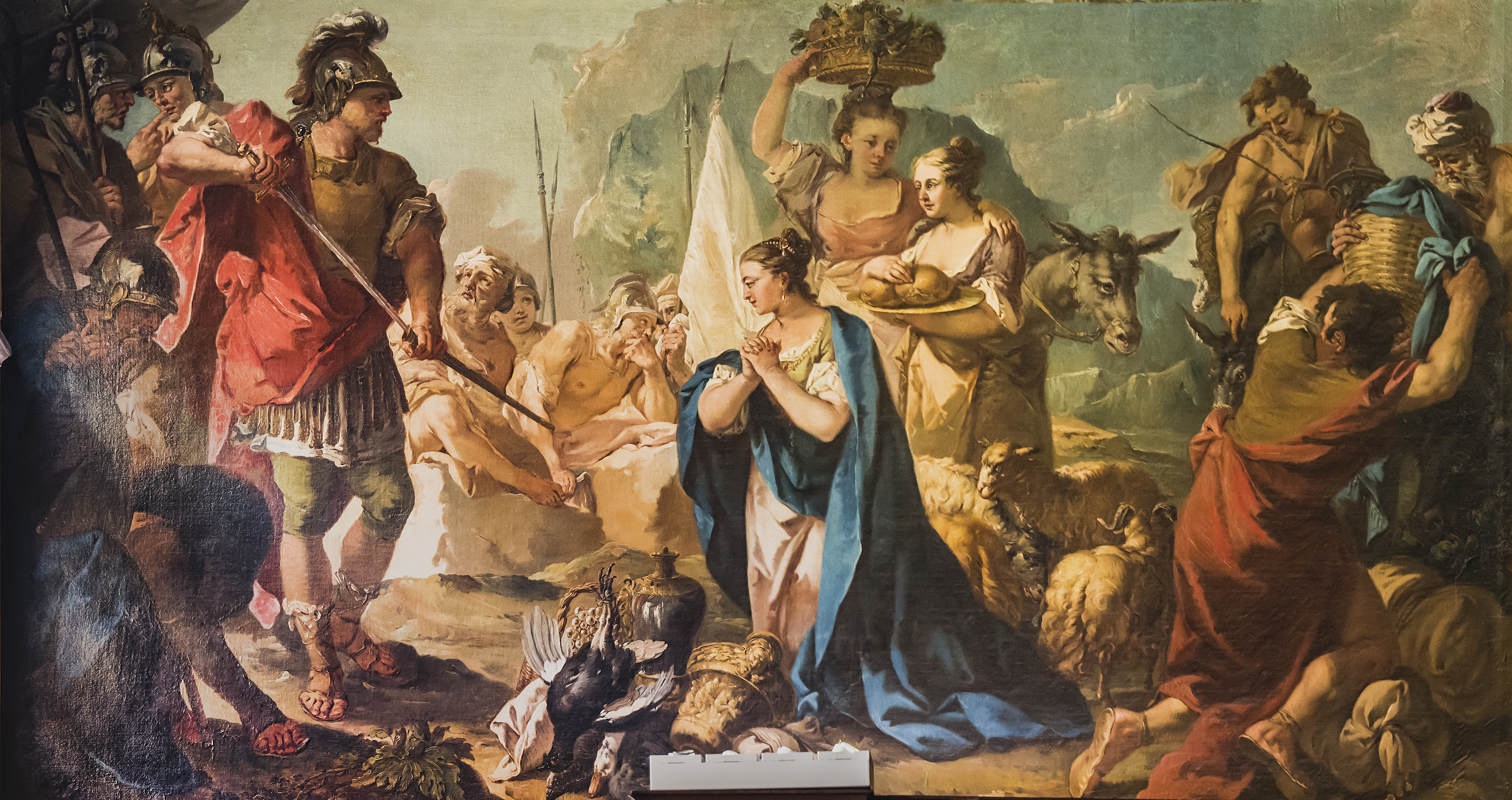
Abigail soothes David, who is angry at her husband Nabal. Giustino Menescardi, mid-18th century

According to Shutter, Nabal, a rich man who insults David, is a dark comic character similar to Squire Western in the classic comedy Tom Jones by Henry Fielding. "He is churlish and evil... blunt in speech, rude, and even boorish in manners... The servants of Nabal say, "He is such a son of Belial [a devil] that a man cannot speak to him!' He is fond of wine and sometimes falls asleep over his cups."

In this same story Greenspoon finds humor in names and wordplay. The root of Nabal's name—"n-b-l"—(and the word "fool") appears as two nouns one of which appears in the expression for "wine skin"; Nabal is a drunk. "The second noun from 'n-b-l' is a feminine form ending with the Hebrew letter he. With the vocalization (that is, vowels) I am thinking of, the word means carcass or corpse. Surely, Nabal was a 'dead man' when he crossed David as he did. The same consonants also make up a noun meaning 'foolishness', the very noun that Abigail used to describe her husband in her plea to David. Reading back then, we can sense a double play on words, as it were, by the narrator of this account".

Walker says, "The Bible reads like a rogue's gallery of unlikely heroes... Gideon the coward, Samson the bully, David the trickster". He gives the example of the powerful and popular warrior David fleeing Saul's murderous jealousy by going to Achish king of Gath, then deciding he'd made a mistake, and coping with that by faking insanity. Macy says this entire scene with David is humorous, but King Achish's response is the epitome of Biblical sarcasm: "Am I so short on insane people in my own kingdom you bring me more from other places?" David fools Achish—then later goes to work for him. Walker says this demonstrates "David's trickster aspect is an equal-employment jester, 'laughable for how it succeeds in duping others and how it recoils to dupe the mischiefmaker".

=== 1 Kings ===
Religion Professor and Presbyterian minister Conrad Hyers finds humor in Elijah's ridicule of "the priests of Baal who wailed and slashed themselves in the hope that Baal would send fire from Heaven. "Shout louder!...Perhaps he is deep in thought, or busy, or traveling; or perhaps he is asleep and must be awakened!" (1 Kings 18:27)

=== Psalms ===
Psalm 2:2, 4 and 37:12–13 speak of God's laughter.

=== Proverbs ===
All scholars who find humor in the Bible agree it can be found in the book of Proverbs. Shutter gives numerous examples such as: "A man of great anger will bear the penalty, for if you rescue him, you will only have to do it again". In other words, a man of violent temper is always getting into difficulties; you have no sooner helped him out of one than he has plunged madly into another. Like the irascible person in the old nursery rhyme, who "jumped into a bramble bush and scratched out both his eyes", he is no sooner extricated than "with all his might and main, he jumps into another bush and puts them out again."

Shutter also says humor is often used to communicate morality claiming "Can a man take fire in his bosom And his clothes not be burned?" is a sarcastic question about adultery. Shutter includes "Wealth makes many "friends"; poverty drives them all away" and "Many curry favor with a ruler, and everyone is the friend of one who gives gifts" as social satire.

"All the brothers of a poor man hate him; How much more do his friends abandon him! He pursues them with words, but they are gone." Shutter references this Proverb as humor by citing a comparison with the satiricist William Makepeace Thackeray: "Thackeray has drawn such a picture in his more elaborate description of Harry Warrington in the sponging house, making vain appeals for help to his rich relatives and friends. His Aunt, a member of the great and always established Church of the Pharisees, sent him her blessing--and a tract!"

=== Ecclesiastes ===
Shutter says biting Biblical humor often gives insight into human nature: "All people spend their lives scratching for food, but they never seem to have enough."

=== Jeremiah ===
Ridicule and political commentary have gone hand in hand for many centuries. According to Shutter, when Jeremiah describes the disaster that fell on Egypt's allies, the comments that follow to the King of Egypt drip with scorn: "Pharaoh, King of Egypt, is but a noise. He hath let the appointed time pass by." "In the same spirit, Queen Catherine says of the dead Wolsey, "His promise was as he then was, mighty; but his performance is as he is now, nothing."

=== Jonah ===
Walker explains that "A crucial function of humor in the Bible is to persuade the self-righteous to laugh at themselves--a process that proves especially enlightening when the self-righteous turn out to be us. Jonah sasses God. Heathen Ninevites and scurrilous sailors prove more pious than the prophet [Jonah], who is subjected unceremoniously to his comeuppance." Shutter points out that Jonah pouts when the Ninevites repent and are not destroyed; he yells at God, 'didn't I know this would happen?' without recognizing the irony in his own comments which is itself ironic. Shutter compares this to the character Mr. Mantalini in Charles Dickens' Nicholas Nickleby.

=== Esther ===
Leonard Greenspoon says "Like Jonah, the Book of Esther is filled with a number of plots and subplots, the humor of which is not always immediately evident." The proud Haman is unaware of his comic nature, but the reader knows the very real irony that "everything Haman plans against his enemies will ultimately be done to him".

Walker finds humor in the comic reversal in Esther. The king asks one night, "What should be done for a man whom the king desires to honor?" (6:6). Haman assumes the king means Haman himself and answers in vivid detail. He is then required to give it all to his worst enemy. Walker also points out the pivotal role in the book of Esther is built around a female, which is a situation filled with cultural commentary and irony. Walker says, "The wit of Esther, by turning our usual expectations upside down, reminds us to expect the unexpected." He says "I second Adele Berlin's ranking of Esther high among "the most humorous books of the Bible, amusing throughout, and at certain points uproriously funny." People who have looked closely find the book funny: "Esther emerges as perhaps the clearest embodiment of the comic vision among all the Biblical narratives."

Walker and Macy both cite the careful attention to words and wordplays in this book, while Walker also includes Esther in what he calls "genial gender humor" where, he says, women often prove to be "more dynamic characters" than their male counterparts and always seem to get the "last scriptural word".

Greenspoon explains "the wisdom and/or bravery exhibited by women and other 'outsiders' is often expressed or acted out at the expense of those who appear to wield the most power. This is in keeping with the frequently articulated theme of biblical humor that demonstrates and reflects God's infinite ability to disrupt the plans of finite humans, especially the seemingly powerful."

=== Daniel ===
Greenspoon notes humorous wordplay in the tale of Susanna, included in the Old Testament of the Roman Catholic and Eastern Orthodox churches. The words of Daniel's judgement is related to details in the false witness of Susanna's accusers.

== New Testament ==
=== Gospels ===
Hyers says "Jesus freely used humor, irony and satire" and offers the examples of "the blind leading the blind; straining out a gnat, then swallowing a camel; meticulously cleaning the outside of a cup while leaving the inside filthy; maintaining whitewashed tombs that are outwardly beautiful but inwardly full of dead men's bones; loudly honoring past prophets while plotting to kill present ones who preach the same message." These are examples of what Whedbee describes as "Jesus as the cynic sage." Comedian Eric Idle opines that Jesus is "not particularly funny, what he's saying isn't mockable, it's very decent stuff..."

=== Acts ===
In the Acts of the Apostles, a young man called Eutychus listens to Paul, falls asleep and then falls out of a window and dies. This story may be a comment on Paul's long-windedness.

Biblical scholar F. F. Bruce finds the story of Rhoda in Acts 12:12–15 "full of vivid humour". When Rhoda hears the voice of Peter, miraculously released from prison, she becomes so happy that she forgets to open the door and let him in.

=== Pauline epistles ===
Paul the Apostle frequently uses sarcasm as a rhetorical device in his letters. Examples of this include 1 Corinthians 1:13 and 1 Corinthians 4:8.

Hyers says "Paul had an unusual way of selling the gospel. His techniques have not been widely followed... Nor has he been hailed as a pioneer in the world of advertising. [Paul's] term for the Christian faith is foolishness. The cross is foolishness. Preaching is foolishness. Christians are called to be fools for Christ's sake. The Apostles are ridiculed as fools, 'a spectacle to the world, to angels and to men' (1 Cor.4:9)." Hyers says themes of divine foolishness overturning human wisdom form the plot lines of many Bible stories and such reversals are familiar in comedy as well. Macy says, "In his letters Paul reveals a robust sense of humor... He teases to teach, uses grand exaggeration, enjoys parody and reversal, and even creates vivid comic [word] pictures." For example in 2 Corinthians 11, Paul uses a biting sarcasm to give what has been termed his "anti-autobiography" while calling himself a fool.

== The Bible as material ==
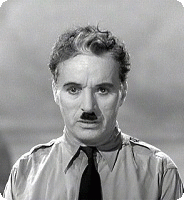
Charlie Chaplin quotes the Gospel of Luke in The Great Dictator (1940)

The Bible has inspired a multitude of art and fiction in many genres, including humor and comedy. William Shakespeare's comedy The Merchant of Venice includes elements from the Book of Daniel. Biblical references can be seen in films with Charlie Chaplin and Laurel and Hardy.

Modern examples include Monty Python's Life of Brian, Mel Brooks' History of the World, Part I and sketches by Rowan Atkinson.

== See also ==
- Religious satire
- Jewish humour
- Humour in Islam
- Humor about Catholicism
