= Bradford Blackmon =

American politician

Member of the Mississippi State Senate from the 21st district
- Incumbent
- Assumed office January 2, 2024
- Preceded by: Barbara Blackmon

Personal details
- Born: Bradford Jerome Blackmon; December 21, 1988 (age 37) Jackson, Mississippi, U.S.
- Party: Democratic
- Parents: Edward Blackmon Jr.; Barbara Martin Blackmon
- Relatives: Lawrence Blackmon (brother)
- Education: University of Pennsylvania (BA); University of Mississippi (JD)
- Occupation: Attorney; politician

Bradford Jerome Blackmon (born December 21, 1988) is an American attorney and Democrat in the Mississippi State Senate from the 21st district since 2023. A son of state representative Edward Blackmon Jr. and state senator Barbara Blackmon, he was elected to succeed his mother after she purposefully dropped out of her re-election race to clear the field for her son.

Born in Jackson, Mississippi, Blackmon attended St. Andrew's Episcopal School, becoming a star football player. He was recruited to the football team for the University of Pennsylvania, where he majored in political science. He later received a Juris Doctor from the University of Mississippi School of Law. He now works as an attorney at a law firm owned by his parents and serves as a city prosecutor for Magnolia, Mississippi.

Blackmon drew national attention in January 2025 after introducing the Contraception Begins at Erection Act, a satiric bill that would make it illegal for a man to discharge semen without the intent to fertilize an embryo.

== Early life and education ==
Blackmon was born on December 21, 1988 in Jackson, Mississippi. His mother is state senator Barbara Blackmon and his father is state representative Edward Blackmon Jr.; his brother is Lawrence Blackmon, a state representative.

He attended St. Andrew's Episcopal School and while there was on the student council and later the football team. He was a star player for the team and recognized by the Mississippi House in a resolution. While a student at St. Andrews, he was a Mississippi State Senate page.

He graduated from the University of Pennsylvania with a Bachelor of Arts in political science. He was recruited to join the university's football team, choosing it over Cornell University and Jackson State University, his parents' alma mater. He received a Juris Doctor from the University of Mississippi School of Law. He was admitted to the Mississippi Bar in 2014.

== Career ==
He works as an attorney at a law firm owned by his parents. He serves as the city prosecutor for Magnolia, Mississippi.

=== Senate ===
In 2023, Blackmon's mother filed to run for re-election for District 21 in the Mississippi State Senate. However, as the election filing deadline approached — and no one else filed to run besides Blackmon — his mother dropped out of the race, allowing for Blackmon to run for election effectively unopposed. His father performed the same maneuver for his brother Lawrence Blackmon in the Mississippi House of Representatives. He won unopposed in the primary election and general election.

On January 20, 2025, Blackmon introduced the Contraception Begins at Erection Act. The bill would make it illegal for a man to discharge "genetic materials" (semen) without the intent to fertilize an embryo. According to Blackmon, the intent of the legislation is to bring the fundamental role of men into the contraception conversation in response to the large volume of legislative activity targeted only at women.

Mississippi State Senate
Preceded by Barbara Blackmon	Member of the Mississippi State Senate from the 21st district 2024–present	Incumbent
