= Billy Adam Calvert =

American politician

Member of the Mississippi House of Representatives from the 83rd district
- Incumbent
- Assumed office January 7, 2020
- Preceded by: Greg Snowden

Personal details
- Born: April 11, 1978 (age 48) Meridian, Mississippi, U.S.
- Party: Republican
- Education: East Mississippi Community College (AS); University of Mississippi (BS)

Billy Adam Calvert is an American politician and businessman serving as a member of the Mississippi House of Representatives from the 83rd district. Elected in November 2019, he assumed office on January 7, 2020.

== Early life and education ==
Calvert was born and raised in Meridian, Mississippi. He earned an associate degree from East Mississippi Community College and a Bachelor of Science degree in applied sciences from the University of Mississippi.

== Career ==
Calvert owns Southern Business Supply, an office supplies store. He was elected to the Mississippi House of Representatives in November 2019 and assumed office on January 7, 2020. Calvert succeeded Greg Snowden.
