= Every Sperm Is Sacred =

Musical sketch from the film Monty Python's The Meaning of Life

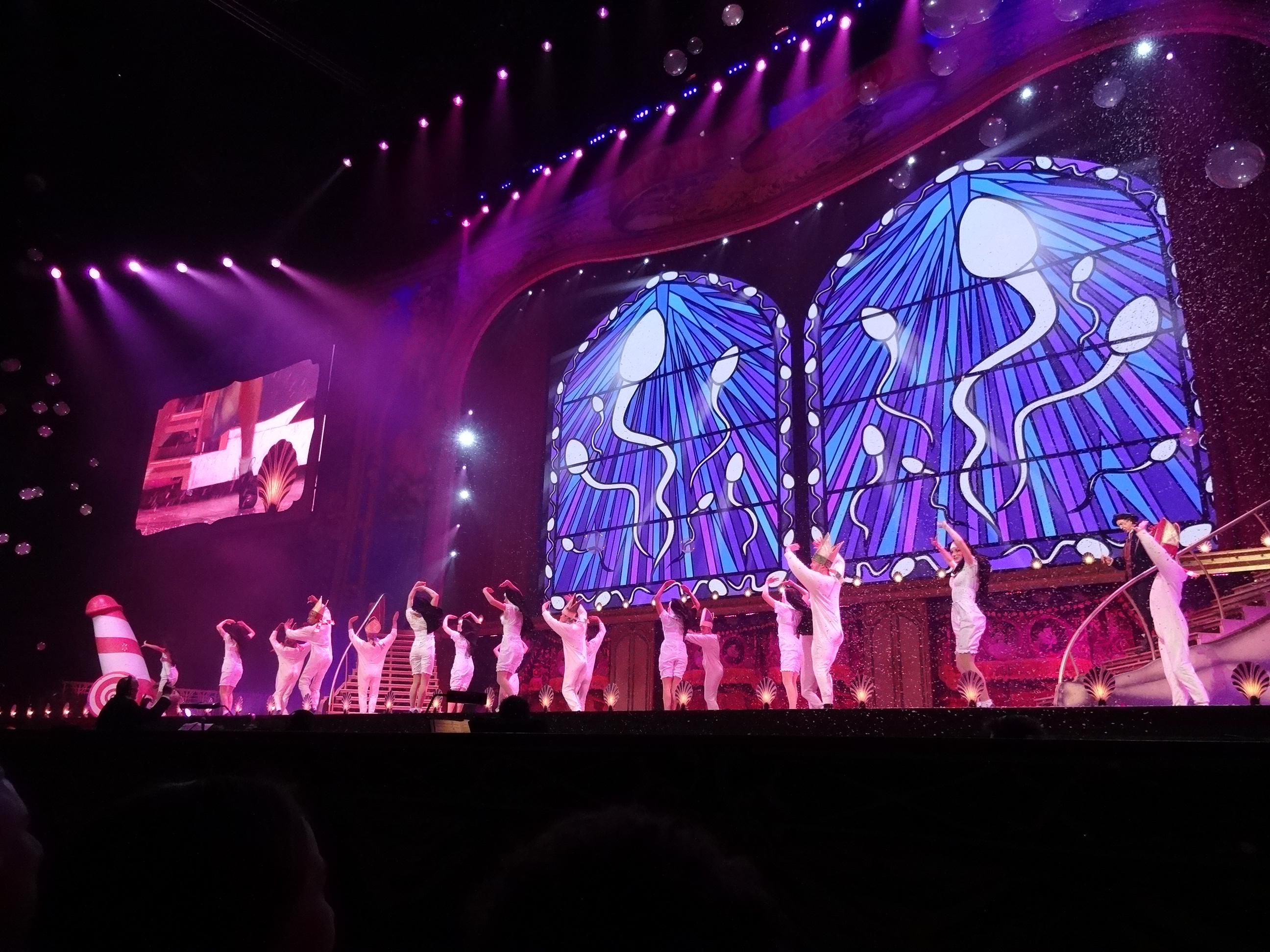
"Every Sperm Is Sacred" performed at the Python reunion, Monty Python Live (Mostly) in 2014

"Every Sperm Is Sacred" is a musical sketch from the film Monty Python's The Meaning of Life. A satire of Catholic teachings on reproduction that forbid masturbation and contraception, the song was released on the album Monty Python Sings and was nominated for a BAFTA Music Award for Best Original Song in a Film in 1983.

André Jacquemin and David Howman wrote the music and Michael Palin and Terry Jones wrote the lyrics and performed the song, which is hailed as one of the Pythons' great sketches. Viewing Python as the "great originator" of combining provocative humour and high-quality original music, Family Guy creator Seth MacFarlane regarded the song as his favourite Python number, stating: "It's so beautifully written, it's musically and lyrically legit, the orchestrations are fantastic, the choreography and the presentation are very, very complex – it's treated seriously."

== Content and production ==
The song is a satire of Catholic teachings on reproduction that forbid masturbation and contraception by artificial means. The sketch, called "The Third World", is about a Catholic Yorkshire worker played by Michael Palin, with his wife played by director Terry Jones. They have sixty-three children, who are about to be sold for scientific experimentation purposes because their parents can no longer afford to care for such a large family with the local mill being closed. When their children ask why they should not use any form of birth control, or why the father cannot perform self-castration, their father explains that this is against God's wishes, and breaks into song, the chorus of which is:

Every sperm is sacred, every sperm is great.
If a sperm is wasted, God gets quite irate.

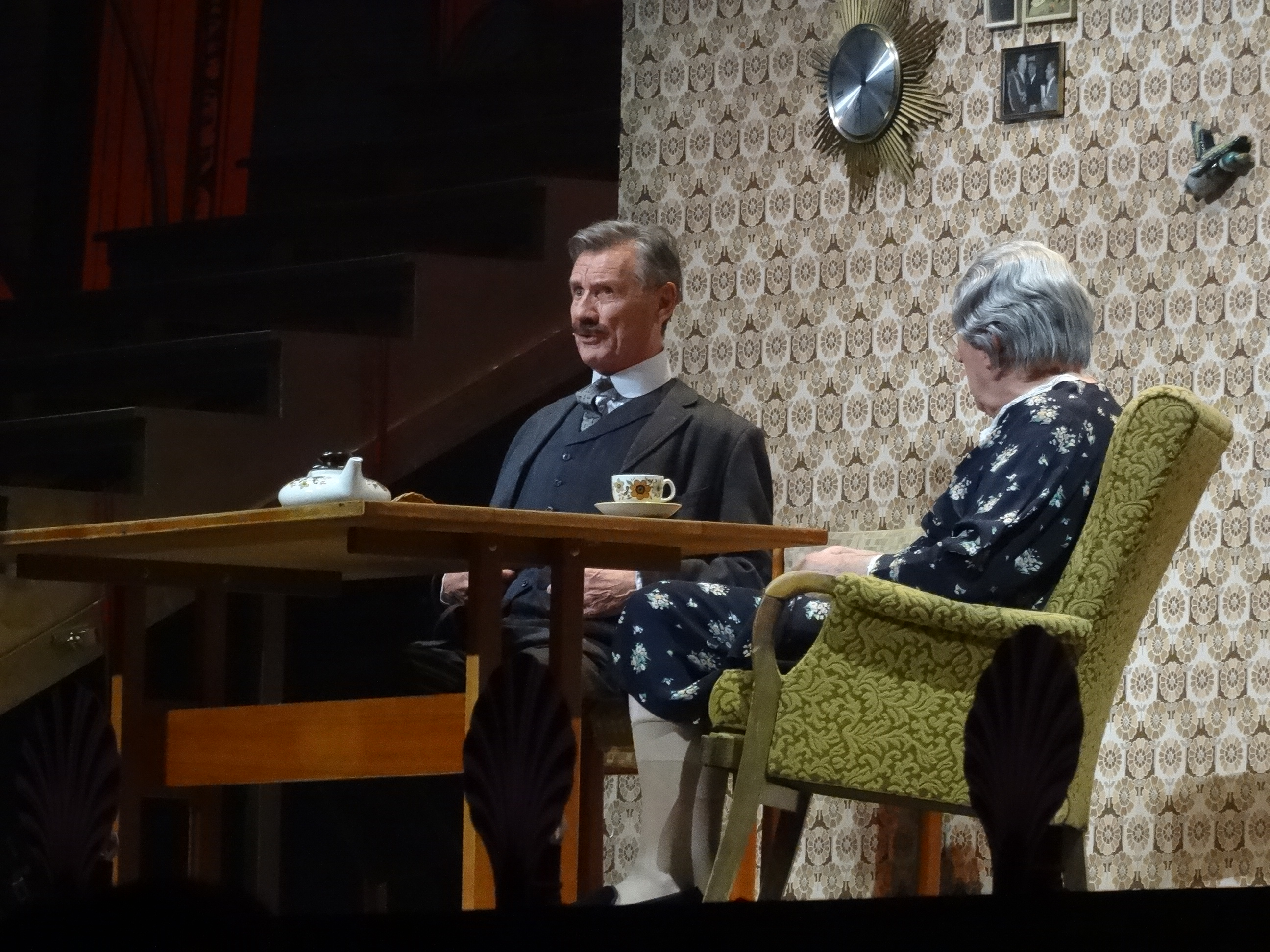
The stern Protestant couple (Palin and Jones at the 2014 Python reunion) comment disapprovingly on the Catholic Church forbidding contraception while the Catholic couple next door (and their 63 children) sing "Every Sperm is Sacred"

The production in The Meaning of Life was filmed in Colne, Lancashire, and Burnley, Lancashire, and choreographed by Arlene Phillips to a storyboard by Jones. The hearty and cheerful nature of the musical number is counterpointed as the children are marched off to their fate as the song ends, singing a dour rendition of the chorus as their middle-aged Protestant neighbours (played by Graham Chapman and Eric Idle) comment on the teachings of the Catholic Church. They add that they have two children, which is the exact number of times they have had sex in their marriage. The grounds of Cartwright Hall art gallery in Bradford, West Yorkshire, was used as a location for the singing and dancing nurses.

The song is a style pastiche of the song "Consider Yourself", from the musical Oliver! by Lionel Bart. Later, Jones denied that it was explicitly written to make fun of the genre of musical comedy: "'Every Sperm is Sacred' is not a parody of these things, it just is those things, it's a musical song, it's a hymn, it's a Lionel Bart-style musical, but it's not making fun of a Lionel Bart-style musical."

The song was performed at Monty Python Live (Mostly), with Idle singing Palin's part. It was also followed by the discussion from the Protestant married couple, with Palin and Jones playing the Protestant husband and wife respectively.

== Influence ==
=== Sexuality and reproduction ===
The phrase "every sperm is sacred" has become almost proverbial in the field of animal and human sexuality and reproduction. This extends to such areas as cloning, where the song is used to criticize anti-cloning activists who argue that every embryo or fertilized egg is sacred. Abortion-rights activists have sung the song outside abortion clinics to ridicule their opponents, legal scholars have alluded to it in discussions of women's reproductive rights, and Emily Martin describes its usage as a reductio ad absurdum of anti-abortion positions.

=== Religion ===
The religious import of the sketch is significant, and is reflected in the widely dispersed usage of the phrase. In the book Monty Python and Philosophy, the argument is teased out to reach a broader (still humorous) conclusion: "The Pythons ask us to consider the consequences of the belief that God cares about our reproductive practices and sees everything. If so, then he watches our sexual activities. ...Christians must concede that all things considered, this [watching people have sex] is one of God's less onerous activities." Philip Jenkins discusses the sketch as an important sign of a growing willingness in the popular media of the 1970s and 1980s to criticize the Catholic Church, saying that "Catholic attitudes toward sex and contraception are ruthlessly parodied" in the song, proving that "Catholicism was available as a legitimate subject of serious fiction." Richard Dawkins, in his The God Delusion, cites the song for that reason, the illustration of the "surreal idiocy" of some pro-religion, anti-abortion arguments.

=== Masturbation ===
It is sometimes difficult to separate the comic from the serious application of the phrase, and two recent publications on the penis use it for precisely that purpose, Talking Cock, by Richard Herring, and Dick: A User's Guide. In both cases, the sketch is used to ridicule those who condemn masturbation, and sex for any purpose other than procreation.

== Reverse censorship ==
According to the interview with Palin on the DVD extras, he said "at the end of my sock" in the original scene, with the word "cock" being overdubbed later. This was done because the scene featured numerous young children and the Pythons were already concerned they were "pushing the limit". Years later, several of the child actors stated they had no idea what they were singing about.

== See also ==
- Contraception Begins at Erection Act
- Humor about Catholicism
