= Clay Mansell =

American politician

Member of the Mississippi House of Representatives from the 56th district
- Incumbent
- Assumed office January 2, 2024
- Preceded by: Philip Gunn

Personal details
- Born: July 4, 1976 (age 50) Jackson, Mississippi
- Party: Republican
- Spouse: Amanda Puryear
- Occupation: Politician
- Profession: Business Owner

Clay Mansell (born July 4, 1976) serves as a member of the Mississippi House of Representatives for the 56th District, affiliating with the Republican Party, a position he has held since 2024.
