= Lawrence Blackmon =

American politician

Member of the Mississippi House of Representatives from the 57th district
- Incumbent
- Assumed office January 2, 2024
- Preceded by: Edward Blackmon Jr.

Personal details
- Born: Lawrence Stephen Blackmon
- Party: Democratic
- Parents: Edward Blackmon Jr.; LaVada Strickland
- Relatives: Bradford Blackmon (brother) Madison Blackmon (brother) Janessa Blackmon (sister)
- Education: Howard University (BA); Mississippi College (JD); George Washington University (LLM)
- Occupation: Lawyer; politician

Lawrence Stephen Blackmon is an American lawyer and Democratic Party politician from Mississippi. A son of state representative Edward Blackmon Jr. and LaVada Strickland, he was elected in 2023 to succeed his father in the Mississippi House of Representatives.

Mississippi House of Representatives
Preceded by Edward Blackmon Jr.	Member of the Mississippi House of Representatives from the 57th district 2024–present	Incumbent
