= Orene Farese =

Former Mississippi senator (1956 - 1958)

Orene Ellis Farese (May 20, 1916 – April 10, 2010) served in the Mississippi Senate. A Democrat, she served in 1956 and 1958. She lived in Ashland and represented Benton County. In 1998 she gave an oral history interview. Her husband, lawyer John B. Farese, was also a state legislator. They had four children.

She was born in Mathiston, Mississippi, She graduated from Blue Mountain College in 1938. She was a schoolteacher.
