= Microsoft acquisition hoax =

Bogus 1994 press release

The Microsoft acquisition hoax is a bogus 1994 press release suggesting that the information technology company Microsoft had acquired the Roman Catholic Church.

The hoax comprises part of a cycle of "Microsoft jokes" in which the Microsoft Corporation is portrayed as a wealthy but evil monopoly built on bloated or unreliable desktop software, planned obsolescence of products, corporate takeovers of once-innovative rivals, and litigiousness. While multiple books have been devoted to the subject, the jokes most commonly circulated online as Internet memes.

== Press release ==
The hoax consisted of a press release, purportedly from the Associated Press, that circulated around the Internet in 1994. The press release claimed that Microsoft "will acquire the Roman Catholic Church in exchange for an unspecified number of shares of Microsoft common stock", and that the company expects "a lot of growth in the religious market in the next five to ten years... the combined resources of Microsoft and the Catholic Church will allow us to make religion easier and more fun for a broader range of people."

Many of the press release's claims were unrealistic (especially for the time period), such as suggesting that Catholics would soon be able to take Holy Communion through their computer and claiming that conversion to Catholicism was an "upgrade". Despite these warning signs, several readers of the false press release contacted Microsoft to confirm the claims of the hoax, and on December 16, 1994, Microsoft formally debunked the claims.

=== Aftermath ===
Follow-up press releases made similarly outrageous claims—for example, one false press release claimed that IBM had acquired the Episcopal Church, and another suggested that the Italian television network RAI had invested in what the release claimed to be "Microsoft Corp.'s planned on-line computer service, the Microsoft Divine Network."

An Internet meme "Microsoft Acquires" spawned a series of similarly formatted mock press releases with an assortment of varying acquisition targets, including the government of the United States of America. According to the release, "United States citizens will be able to expect lower taxes, increases in government services, discounts on all Microsoft products and the immediate arrest of all executive officials of Sun Microsystems Inc. and Netscape Corp." One meta-joke claimed that Microsoft ultimately put an end to the jokes by acquiring the phrase "Microsoft Acquires".
