= Milton Case =

American lawyer and politician (1934–1991)

George Milton Case (July 5, 1934 – January 24, 1991) was an American lawyer and state legislator in Mississippi. He lived in Canton, Mississippi, and served in the Mississippi House of Representatives from 1960 to 1964. He was a Democrat.

Case was born in Canton, Mississippi. He went to Canton High School, Holmes Junior College, and the University of Mississippi (Ole Miss).

Case was a Baptist and belonged to the Knights of Pythias. He was also a member of the Masons, Lions, Jaycees, and Elks.

He testified about books addressing racial discrimination and faculty opposition to a conservative club at Ole Miss.
