= Philip Gunn =

American politician (born 1963)

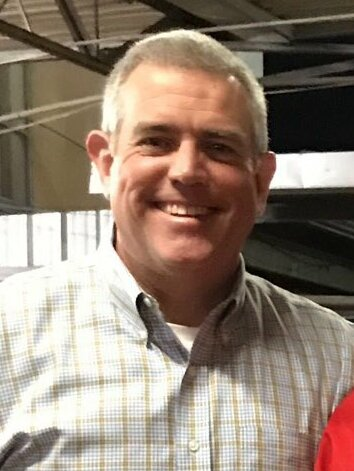
- Gunn in 2019

61st Speaker of the Mississippi House of Representatives
- In office January 3, 2012 – January 2, 2024
- Preceded by: William McCoy
- Succeeded by: Jason White

Member of the Mississippi House of Representatives from the 56th district
- In office January 6, 2004 – January 2, 2024
- Preceded by: Jep Barbour
- Succeeded by: Clay Mansell

Personal details
- Born: Philip Anthony Gunn; January 27, 1963 (age 63) Hattiesburg, Mississippi, U.S.
- Party: Republican
- Spouse: Lisa Watkins
- Children: 4
- Education: Baylor University (BBA); University of Mississippi (JD)
- Website: Official website

Philip Anthony Gunn (born January 27, 1963) is an American politician from the U.S. state of Mississippi. A member of the Republican Party, Gunn was the Speaker of the Mississippi House of Representatives and represented the 56th district. He served in the Mississippi House beginning in 2004 and became Speaker in 2012. Gunn was the first Republican to serve as Speaker of the Mississippi House since 1876. He left office in 2024.

Gunn is a declared candidate for Governor of Mississippi in 2027.

== Early life and career ==
Gunn graduated from high school in Clinton, Mississippi. He attended Baylor University, where he was a walk-on for the Baylor Bears football team. He graduated from Baylor with a Bachelor of Business Administration in 1985.

Gunn worked as a waiter for a year and then attended the University of Mississippi School of Law, where he graduated with a Juris Doctor. He served as president of the student government while attending law school.

== Mississippi House of Representatives ==
Gunn was encouraged to run for election to the Mississippi House of Representatives in 2003, due to redistricting that hurt Clinton. He faced incumbent fellow Republican Jep Barbour, the nephew of Haley Barbour. Gunn lost the primary election by 17 votes, but found an error in how the districts were drawn, disenfranchising some voters. A re-vote was scheduled, and Gunn won by 155 votes. Barbour appealed the re-vote to the Mississippi Supreme Court, which ruled in Gunn's favor in April 2004.

The Republicans became the majority of the Mississippi House following the 2011 elections, and Gunn was chosen to be their candidate for Speaker by the Republican delegation; he won the position with no opposing votes when the whole House convened on January 3, 2012. Gunn became the first Republican Speaker of the Mississippi House since Isaac Shadd, who served as Speaker from 1874 through 1876.

Following the Charleston church shooting in June 2015 and subsequent discussion of the flying of the Confederate battle flag at the South Carolina State House, Gunn publicly called for the removal of the battle flag from the flag of Mississippi, which was added to the flag by lawmakers in 1894.

After the resignation of Senator Thad Cochran in March 2018, it became speculated that Governor Bryant would name Gunn as Cochran's successor.

On November 9, 2022, Gunn announced he would not be seeking re-election to the State House in 2023.

== Political positions ==
=== Abortion ===
Gunn is pro-life and supports a ban on abortion. He cites his "personal belief" that abortion should not be allowed in any case, and that child rape victims should be forced to carry their rapists's babies as he personally opposes abortion access in all cases.

== Personal life ==
Gunn's sister and parents were killed in a motor vehicle accident caused by a drunk driver.

Gunn met his wife, Lisa (née Watkins), while he attended Baylor. The couple has four children. Gunn serves as an elder in his church.

Political offices
Preceded by William McCoy	Speaker of the Mississippi House of Representatives; 2012–2024	Succeeded by Jason White
