= Flag of Mississippi =

U.S. state flag

Mississippi
- Other names: Mississippi flag, "In God We Trust" flag, New Magnolia flag
- Use: Civil and state flag
- Proportion: 3∶5
- Adopted: January 11, 2021; 5 years ago
- Design: A blue Canadian pale bordered by two narrow gold vertical bars, flanked by wider red outer bars. Centered, a stylized white magnolia blossom with a stamen in gold, encircled by twenty white five-pointed stars. Completing the circle is a gold five-point segmented star at the top, and at the bottom the motto "IN GOD WE TRUST."
- Designed by: Rocky Vaughan, Sue Anna Joe, Kara Giles, Dominique Pugh, and Micah Whitson

The flag of Mississippi is the official flag of the U.S. state of Mississippi. Its design consists of a white magnolia blossom surrounded by 21 stars and the words "In God We Trust" written below, on a blue Canadian pale with two vertical gold borders on a red field. The topmost star, gold and composed of a pattern of five diamonds, "represents ... the ... Native American tribes of ... Mississippi"; the other 20 stars are white and "[represent] Mississippi as the twentieth state" of the U.S. The current flag was adopted on January 11, 2021, replacing the previous design discontinued in 2020.

The flag was designed by Rocky Vaughan, "with [the] support [of]" Sue Anna Joe, Kara Giles, and Dominique Pugh. It was chosen by the "Commission to Redesign the Mississippi State Flag", and was submitted for public vote as a ballot measure on November 3, 2020. The bill required that "the design of the Confederate Battle Flag" not be included on the proposed design and the motto "In God We Trust" be included. Voters were asked to "vote 'Yes' or 'No'" on the proposed flag; they were not given the option to vote to retain the old flag.

It is one of three U.S. state flags to feature the words "In God We Trust" (the U.S. national motto), with the other two being those of Florida and Georgia.

== Statute ==
=== Design of the flag ===
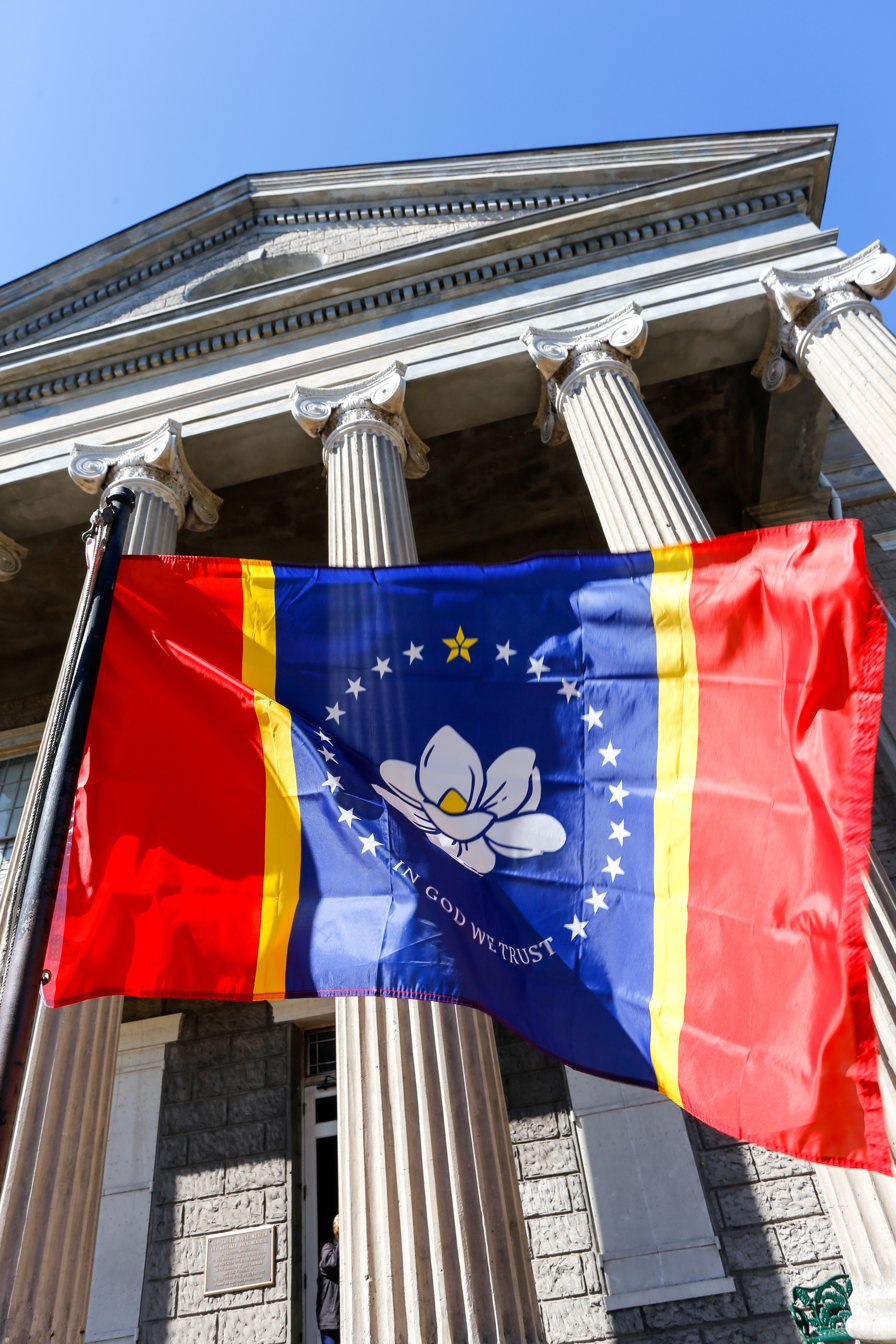
Mississippi state flag at the Old Courthouse in Vicksburg, 2022

The 2024 Mississippi Code, Title 3, § 3-3-16, simplified, describes the state flag as follows:

Dimensions 3:5, but variable, with two vertical bars at the hoist and the fly; the red outer bars are five times wider than the inner gold bars, flanking a blue central panel. In the center of the panel is a stylized white magnolia blossom with a stamen in gold, surrounded by a circle of twenty white five-pointed stars (ten on the hoist side and ten on the fly side). The circle is completed at the top by a gold five-point segmented star and at the bottom by the motto 'IN GOD WE TRUST' in capital letters and Americana Bold font.

=== Colors ===
The statute further defines the colors of the state flag as follows:

Name	Web color	Pantone	Usage on Flag
Old Glory Red		200 C	Outer vertical bars
Old Gold		7563 C	Inner vertical bars; stamen of the magnolia
Old Glory Blue		282 C	Central panel
White		White	Magnolia blossom; twenty-five stars

=== Symbolism ===
The statute concludes with an explanation of the intended symbolism of the design: the magnolia represents the state flower, hospitality, hope, and rebirth; the circle of twenty stars denotes Mississippi as the twentieth state, with the top gold star honoring Indigenous peoples and symbolizing the five inhabited continents; the blue central panel echoes the American flag and signifies vigilance, justice, and perseverance; the red bars symbolize hardiness and valor; and the gold bars and magnolia stamen represent Mississippi’s rich cultural history in the visual and performing arts.

== History ==
Mississippi has had three official state flags in its history. The first flag, known as the "Magnolia Flag", was adopted in 1861 and remained in use until 1865. The state was then left without an official flag until the second one was adopted in 1894. In 2020, state legislators proposed new flag designs, leading to the adoption of the current flag the following year.

=== First flag (1861–1865) ===
State flag (1861–1865)

Unofficial flag variant (Note: "It was likely a post-war flag, designed for use by one or more of Mississippi's United Confederate Veterans units. Then over time, it was mistakenly identified as 'the' Magnolia flag.")

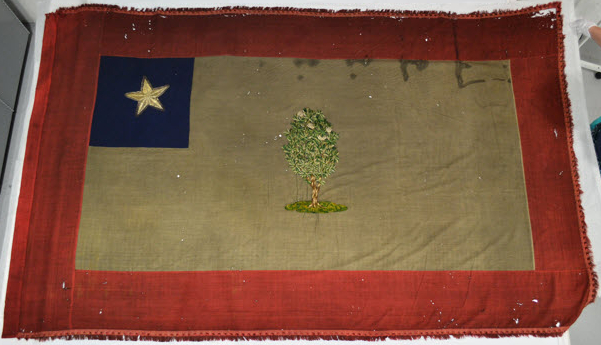
1861 state flag captured during the Civil War (State Historical Society of Iowa)

Before 1861, Mississippi lacked a flag. When the State Convention at the Capitol in Jackson declared its secession from the United States ("the Union") on January 9, 1861, near the start of the American Civil War, spectators in the balcony handed a Bonnie Blue flag down to the state convention delegates on the convention floor, and one was raised over the state capitol building in Jackson as a sign of independence. Later that night, residents of Jackson paraded through the streets under the banner. Harry McCarthy, an Irish singer and playwright who observed the street parade, was inspired to write the patriotic song "The Bonnie Blue Flag."

The first flag was known as the "Magnolia flag." It was the official state flag from March 30, 1861, until August 22, 1865. On January 26, 1861, the delegates to the state convention approved the report of a special committee that had been appointed to design a coat of arms and "a suitable flag." The flag recommended by the committee was a "Flag of white ground, a magnolia tree in the centre, a blue field in the upper left hand corner with a white star in the centre, the Flag to be finished with a red border and a red fringe at the extremity of the Flag." Due to time constraints and the pressure to raise "means for the defense of the state," the delegates neglected to adopt the flag officially in January but did so when they reassembled in March 1861. The Magnolia Flag was not widely used during the war, as the various Confederate flags were displayed more frequently. Following the war's end, a state constitutional convention nullified many of the ordinances and resolutions passed by the State Convention of 1861. Among those nullified was the ordinance of March 1861 "to provide a Coat of Arms and Flag for the State of Mississippi." Thus, the Magnolia Flag was declared to be "null and void" in 1865.

After the war Governor William L. Sharkey ordered the state militia carry the Stars and Stripes and a state flag described as bearing the coat of arms and motto of the state with name and number of the regiment.

=== Second flag (1894–2020) ===
State flag (1894–1996), before any standardization.

State flag (1894–2020) (standardized 1996–2020)

On February 7, 1894, the Legislature replaced the Civil War era Magnolia Flag with a new one designed by Edward N. Scudder that incorporated the Confederate battle flag in its canton. This second state flag consisted of three equal horizontal triband of blue, white, and red, with the canton of the Confederate battle flag. The thirteen stars on the state flag officially represented "the number of the original states of the Union", although they are sometimes thought to be for the states that seceded from the Union, plus Missouri and Kentucky, which had both Confederate and Union governments.

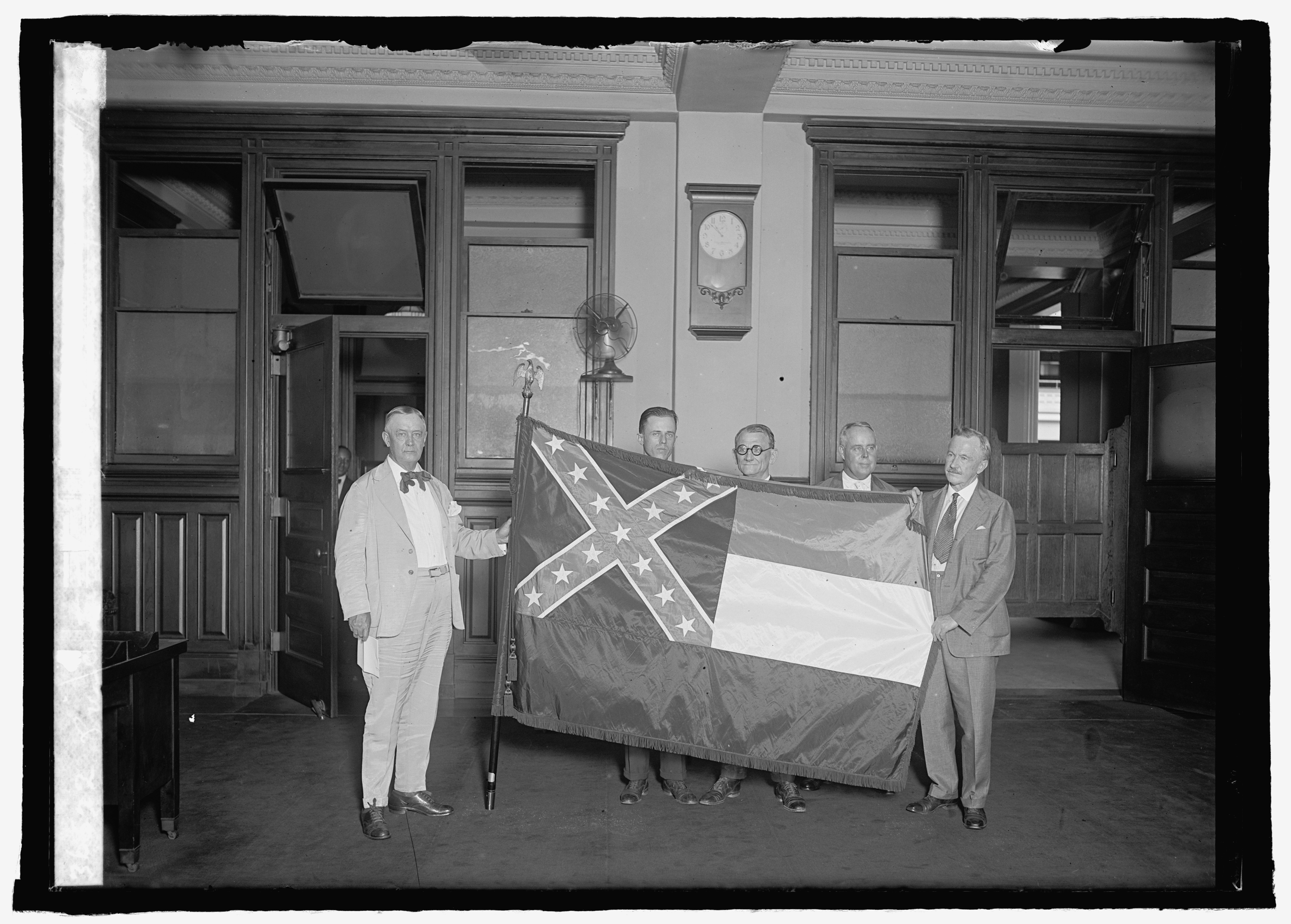
Presentation of the state flag at an unknown event, July 7, 1925.

The Mississippi Code of 1972, in Title 3, Chapter 3, described the flag as follows:

§ 3-3-16. Design of state flag. The official flag of the State of Mississippi shall have the following design: with width two-thirds (2/3) of its length; with the union (canton) to be square, in width two-thirds (2/3) of the width of the flag; the ground of the union to be red and a broad blue saltire thereon, bordered with white and emblazoned with thirteen (13) mullets or five-pointed stars, corresponding with the number of the original States of the Union; the field to be divided into three (3) bars of equal width, the upper one blue, the center one white, and the lower one, extending the whole length of the flag, red (the national colors); this being the flag adopted by the Mississippi Legislature in the 1894 Special Session.

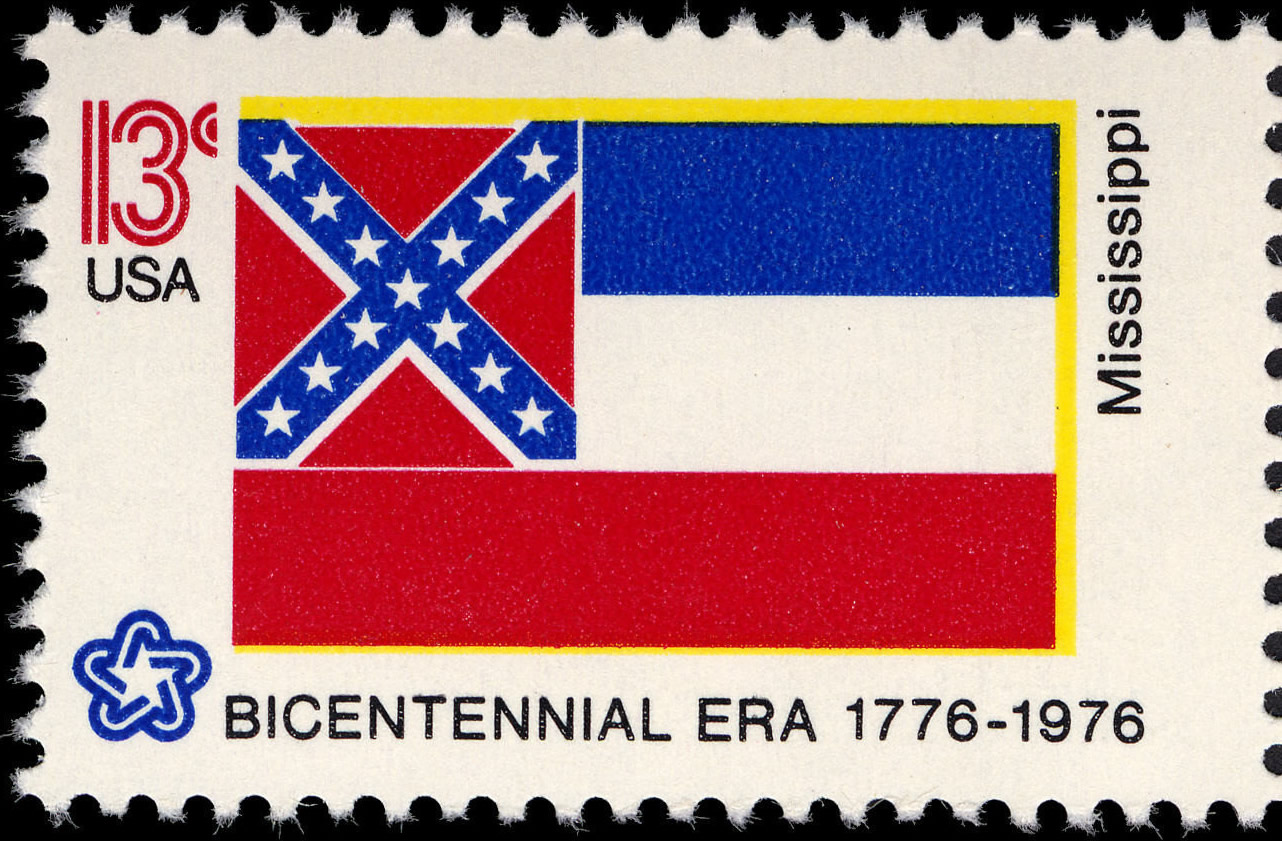
The Mississippi state flag as depicted in the 1976 bicentennial postage stamp series.

In 1996, governor Kirk Fordice sent a memorandum to every manufacturer that produced a Mississippi flag, ordering for the stars in the canton to face upward, and for fimbriation to be added around the canton. The fimbriation was to be the same width as the white outline on the cross of the canton. Before 1996, the flag was often produced with unaligned stars and no fimbriation.

In 1906, Mississippi adopted a revised legal code that repealed all general laws that were not reenacted by the legislature or brought forward in the new code. The legislature inadvertently omitted mention of the 1894 flag, leaving the state with no official state flag from 1906 to 2001. In 2000, the Supreme Court of Mississippi confirmed that the state legislature had in 1906 repealed the 1894 adoption of the state flag; the flag used since then and considered official had actually only been customary or traditional.

From 1894 to 1956, and again from 2003 to 2020, this was the only state flag to incorporate the Confederate battle flag into its design; from 1956 to 2003 it was one of two, Georgia being the other.

== Current flag (2020–present) ==
State flag (2021–present)

In response to the George Floyd protests in 2020, state legislators proposed new flag designs omitting the Confederate flag.

On June 9, 2020, lawmakers gathered votes and started drafting legislation to change the state flag. This was the first substantial action to change the state flag since the 2001 referendum. The proposed legislation would adopt Laurin Stennis's design as the new flag of Mississippi. With the support of Republican Speaker of the House, Philip Gunn, lawmakers began to court Republican state house members to vote for the resolution.

Gunn ensured that he would get the resolution passed through a House committee if verbal support from 30 Republicans was secured to go along with the 45 Democratic members of the House. An update on June 10 showed that lawmakers believed that they had secured at least 20 Republicans who were in favor of voting for the resolution to change the flag, while 20 more were on the fence. The lawmakers' goal was to secure at least 40 Republicans needed to suspend rules to allow a bill to be considered in the session. On June 11, Senate Democrats filed a resolution to change the state flag.

On June 18, 2020, the commissioner of the Southeastern Conference, Greg Sankey, announced the SEC would consider banning championship events in Mississippi until the flag was changed. The SEC is the athletic conference for the two largest universities in Mississippi, Ole Miss and Mississippi State. The announcement by the conference was followed by support of changing the flag from Chancellor Glenn Boyce of the University of Mississippi (Ole Miss) and President Mark E. Keenum of Mississippi State University. The athletic directors of the universities, Keith Carter (Ole Miss) and John Cohen (Mississippi State), also supported changing the flag, along with various coaches from the universities.

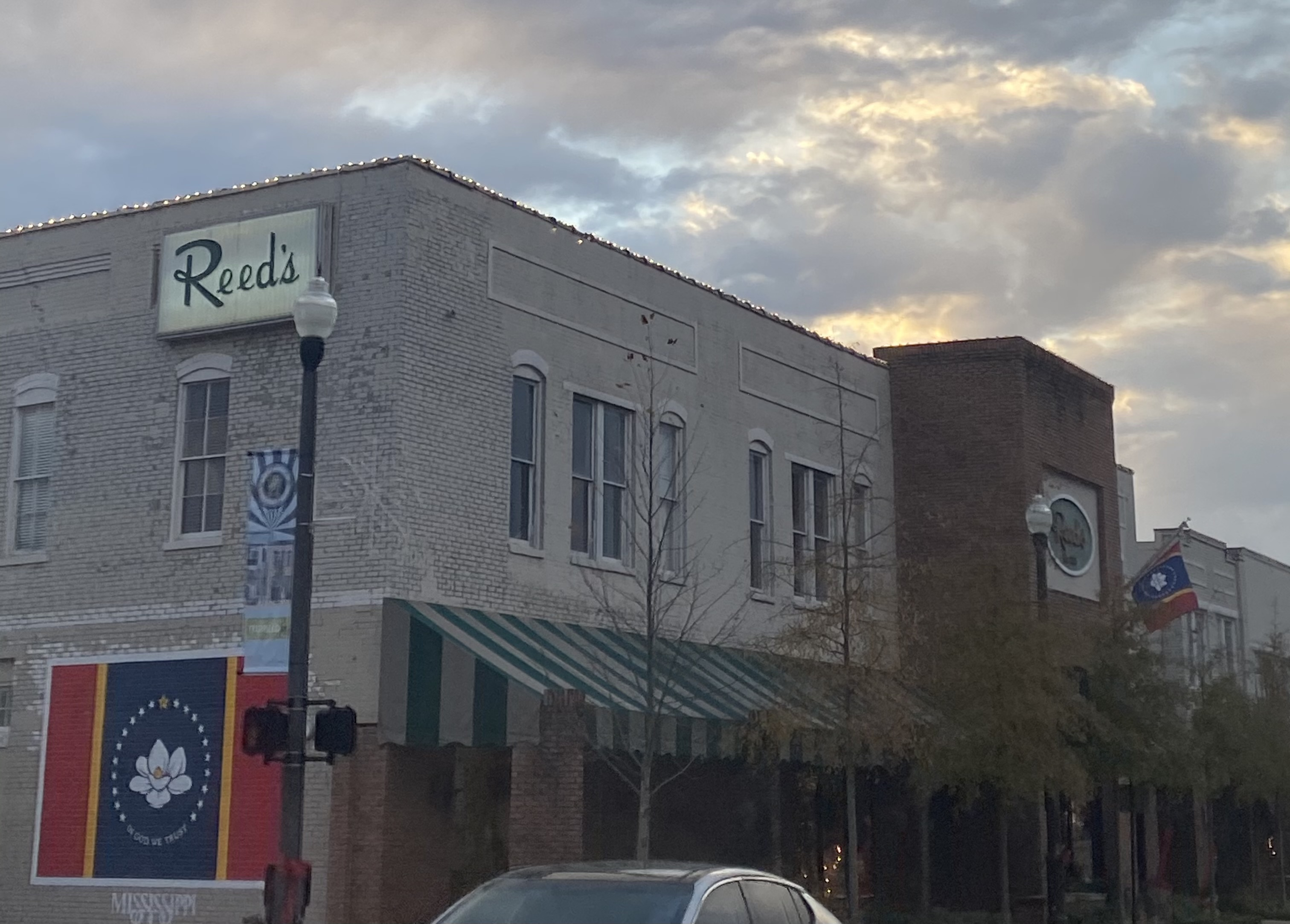
Mural of the state flag on Reed's department store in Tupelo.

On June 19, the National Collegiate Athletic Association (NCAA) banned all post-season play from occurring in Mississippi until the flag was changed. The NCAA had previously banned predetermined events such as football bowl games and men's basketball tournament games in 2001 from occurring in the state. The new rule would have also banned merit-based championship sites, such as baseball regionals, softball regionals, women's basketball tournament games and tennis tournament games. Ole Miss hosted both baseball and softball regionals in 2019. Mississippi State hosted a baseball regional, men's tennis tournament games and women's basketball tournament games in 2019.

Also on June 19, the leaders of the eight public universities in Mississippi (Alcorn State University, Delta State University, Jackson State University, Mississippi State University, Mississippi University for Women, Mississippi Valley State University, University of Mississippi and University of Southern Mississippi) issued a joint statement calling for a new state flag. On June 22, Conference USA banned all postseason play in Mississippi until the removal of the Confederate emblem from the state flag. Conference USA was home to the state's third largest university, Southern Miss, until moving to the Sun Belt Conference in 2023, and hosted its annual baseball tournament in Mississippi for eight times in nine years from 2011-19. On June 23, presidents of the fifteen community colleges in Mississippi issued a joint statement showing their support for a new flag.

The Mississippi Baptist Convention condemned the former state flag on June 23, 2020. In a statement, Baptist leaders said: "The racial overtones of the flag's appearance make this discussion a moral issue. Since the principal teachings of Scripture are opposed to racism, a stand against such is a matter of biblical morality." Walmart announced that it would cease displaying the state flag at its 85 Mississippi store locations on June 23, 2020. The retailer normally displays the applicable state flag alongside the U.S. national flag at its locations in the U.S.

=== 2020 legislative action ===
On June 24, 2020, Lieutenant Governor Delbert Hosemann announced his support for a new flag. Hosemann was joined by Attorney General Lynn Fitch, State Auditor Shad White, Agriculture Commissioner Andy Gipson and Insurance Commissioner Mike Chaney. On June 27, 2020, the Mississippi Legislature passed a resolution, House Concurrent Resolution 79, that suspended rules in the legislative chambers in order to debate and vote on a bill to remove and replace the state flag. The motion passed the House on an 85–34 vote and the Senate on a 36–14 vote.

At that time, there was no consensus on the method of changing the flag, whether it be retiring the current flag or immediately adopting another. A proposal floated by several members of the Legislature was to create a new Mississippi flag. This flag, with a yet-to-be-determined design that did not include any Confederate images, would be used alongside the current flag. This plan was soundly rejected by Governor Tate Reeves who said it would not "satisfy either side of this debate" and compared it to the separate but equal doctrine.

After asserting that the decision to change the flag should be made by "the people of [Mississippi]", and not in "a backroom deal by a bunch of politicians", Governor Tate Reeves June 27 stated that if the Mississippi Legislature passed a bill that weekend addressing the flag issue, he would sign it into law. On June 28, 2020, the Legislature passed a bill, House Bill 1796, that would relinquish the state flag, remove the state flag from public buildings within 15 days of the bill's effective date, and constitute a nine-member commission to design a new flag that would be put to voters in a referendum to be held in November 2020. The bill required that the Confederate battle flag not be included on the proposed design, and the motto "In God We Trust" be included, as Georgia did when it removed the Confederate emblem from its state flag in 2003. In the House, the bill was passed by 91 in favor and 23 against. In the Senate, the bill was passed with 37 in favor and 14 against. Reeves then signed it into law on June 30, 2020.

=== 2020 referendum ===
The five finalists selected by the commission on August 18, 2020

==== Formation ====
Under the terms of House Bill 1796 (approved by the governor on June 30, 2020), a body known as the commission to Redesign the Mississippi State Flag would be constituted to suggest a design for a new state flag no later than September 14, 2020. The bill instructed the Mississippi Department of Archives and History to develop a plan for the removal of the 1894 flag from public buildings across the state and provide administrative support for the commission. The act stipulated that any design proposed by the commission must include the words "In God We Trust" and must not contain the Confederate battle flag. The proposed design would then be subject to a referendum to be held concurrently with the general election on November 3, 2020.

==== Submission phase ====
The Mississippi Department of Archives and History invited the public to submit designs for a new state flag on July 13. In accordance with the rules imposed by House Bill 1796, designs would only be accepted if they contained the words "In God We Trust" and not include the Confederate battle flag. The commission also added that suggestions would need to be unique and adhere to principles of the North American Vexillological Association: that the design should use only two or three basic colors, be simple enough for a child to draw, and have meaningful symbolism.

More than 2000 submissions meeting the legislative criteria were received and displayed on the Mississippi Department of Archives and History website. Each of the 9 commission members picked 25 flags, narrowing the list down to 147. While a modified Hospitality flag did not proceed beyond the first round, a similar-looking "Mosquito flag" briefly did, apparently due to a commissioner's typographical error. At an August 14 meeting, the commission announced that they had selected nine finalists. These finalists, depicting various elements including a representation of the Mississippi River, magnolias, and stars composed of diamonds significant to the Choctaw nation, had either red, white, and blue or green and white color schemes. The commission announced that they would narrow these designs down to five finalists at its next meeting on August 18.

==== Selection of finalists ====
Five finalists were published on August 18, and this was reduced to two flags on August 25.

The final two flags were the "Great River Flag" designed by Micah Whitson and "The New Magnolia" designed by Rocky Vaughan, Sue Anna Joe, Kara Giles and Dominique Pugh.

==== Final design ====
On September 2, the commission voted 8–1 to put the New Magnolia flag on the November ballot. Slight modifications were made to the original design, including making the text bolder and the red and gold bars thicker. The flag is officially referred to as the "In God We Trust Flag". Rocky Vaughan is credited with designing the flag's overall layout, with design support provided by Sue Anna Joe, Kara Giles and Dominique Pugh (who created the magnolia illustration featured in the center). Micah Whitson was also given credit for the appearance of the Native American star. The flag was approved by 73% of the votes cast in a referendum on November 3, 2020. The flag was passed by the Mississippi State House of Representatives on January 5, 2021, and was passed by the State Senate on January 6, 2021. It officially became the state flag after being signed by the state's Governor on January 11, 2021.

== Flag change proposals ==
=== 2001 referendum ===
2001 flag proposal

In January 2001, Governor Ronnie Musgrove appointed an independent commission which developed a new proposed flag design. On April 17, 2001, a legally binding state referendum to change the flag was put before Mississippi voters by the legislature on recommendation of this commission.

The referendum, which asked voters if the new design prepared by the independent commission should be adopted, was defeated in a vote of 64% (488,630 votes) to 36% (267,812), and the 1894 state flag was retained. The proposed flag would have replaced the Confederate rebel battle flag with a blue square canton with 20 white stars in a circular row. The outer ring of 13 stars would represent the original Thirteen Colonies, the middle ring of six stars would represent the six nations that have had sovereignty over Mississippi Territory (various Native American nations as a collective nation, French Empire, Spanish Empire, British Empire, the Confederate States, and the United States) as well as the six states that precede Mississippi's admission (Vermont, Kentucky, Tennessee, Ohio, Louisiana, and Indiana), and the inner and slightly larger star would represent Mississippi itself. The 20 stars would also represent Mississippi's status as the 20th U.S. state and member of the United States of America.

When Georgia adopted a new state flag in 2003, the Mississippi flag remained the only U.S. state flag to include the Confederate battle flag's saltire. A 2001 survey conducted by the North American Vexillological Association (NAVA) placed Mississippi's flag 22nd in design quality of the 72 Canadian provincial, U.S. state, and U.S. territorial flags ranked.

=== 2015 replacement efforts ===
In the wake of the 2015 Charleston, South Carolina, church shooting, in which nine black parishioners of the Emanuel African Methodist Episcopal Church were killed by Confederacy admirer and white supremacist Dylann Roof, there were renewed calls for Southern states to cease using the Confederate battle flag in official capacities. This extended to increased criticism of Mississippi's state flag. All eight public universities in Mississippi, along with "several cities and counties", including Biloxi, later refused to fly the state flag until the emblem was removed. The flag was excluded from state-flag displays in New Jersey, Oregon, and Philadelphia that included the flags of the other 49 states.

On September 10, 2015, Steve Earle released the single "Mississippi It's Time" with all proceeds going towards the civil rights organization, Southern Poverty Law Center. The song was produced by Earle and recorded with his longtime backup band, the Dukes, in the summer of 2015 in the aftermath of the massacre at the Emanuel African Methodist Episcopal Church in June 2015. The song advocates for removal of the Confederate flag from state grounds and tackles historical themes of slavery, racism, patriotism, and progress since the Civil War.

Over 20 flag-related bills, some calling for another statewide referendum, were introduced in the legislature in 2015 and 2016, but none made it out of committee. A 2016 federal lawsuit alleging that the flag is tantamount to "state-sanctioned hate speech" was dismissed by both a district court and the 5th Circuit Court of Appeals. The US Supreme Court declined to hear the case.

=== Hospitality flag ===
Hospitality flag proposal

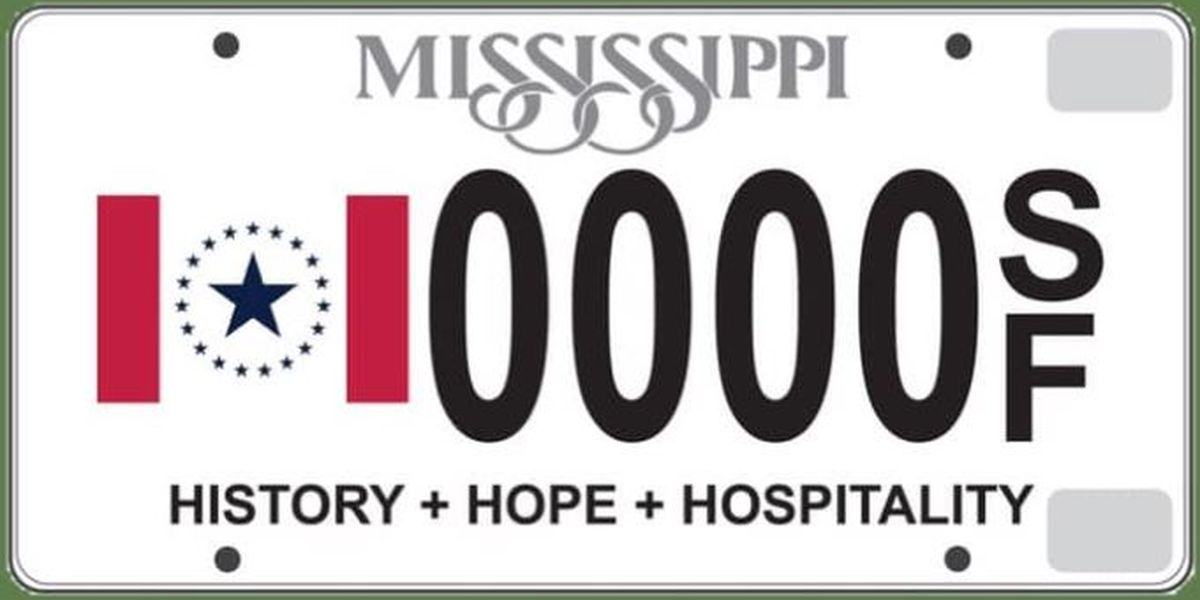
Mississippi specialty license plate advertising the Stennis flag proposal, made available for purchase in 2019.

An alternative was devised in 2014 by artist Laurin Stennis, granddaughter of former U.S. senator John C. Stennis. Her proposal was originally dubbed the "Declare Mississippi flag" but was popularly called the "Stennis flag" and later renamed the "Hospitality flag". In June 2020, Stennis stepped back from the effort to change the 1894 flag, citing potential harm associated with her last name, which she shares with her grandfather who was a segregationist for much of his career. In August 2020, the copyrighted design was withdrawn from being an option for a new flag because it did not include the legislature-mandated "In God We Trust" slogan.

The flag consists of a single blue star on a white field, an inversion of the white star on a blue field of the Bonnie Blue flag. It is encircled by 19 smaller stars representing each state in the Union when Mississippi joined, as well as symbolizing "unity and continuity" drawing inspiration from the artifacts of the indigenous peoples of the region. The central white field represents "faith and possibility", and is flanked on each side by vertical red bars, representing "the blood spilled by Mississippians, whether civilian or military, who have honorably given their lives in pursuit of liberty and justice for all". In an interview, Stennis said the red bars also stand for "Mississippians' 'passionate differences' on the flag issue".

Since its inception, numerous bills were brought before the legislature to have the Stennis flag declared the new state flag, but none of them passed. On April 17, 2019, Mississippi governor Phil Bryant signed a new specialty license plates bill. One of the new specialty plates included the Stennis flag along with the phrase "History + Hope + Hospitality". This was the first time that the Stennis flag's design received some form of state sanction by being used in an official capacity.

=== Bicentennial flag ===
Mississippi Bicentennial flag

A flag was created by the Mississippi Economic Council to celebrate the state's bicentennial in 2017. This flag consisted of a blue, white and red tricolor with the state seal centered on the white stripe. The flag also had the words "Established 1817" and "Bicentennial 2017" written on the white stripe on either side of the seal. This flag, without the wording, has been used as an alternative state flag and has been suggested as a possible replacement for it.

In late June 2020, former Governor Phil Bryant suggested using the bicentennial flag as a future state flag. Following the retirement of the previous state flag on June 30, 2020, this banner was used in some instances as a de facto placeholder. African American Mississippians from 2017 to 2020 frequently used the bicentennial flag along with the 2001 proposed flag.

== Other flags ==
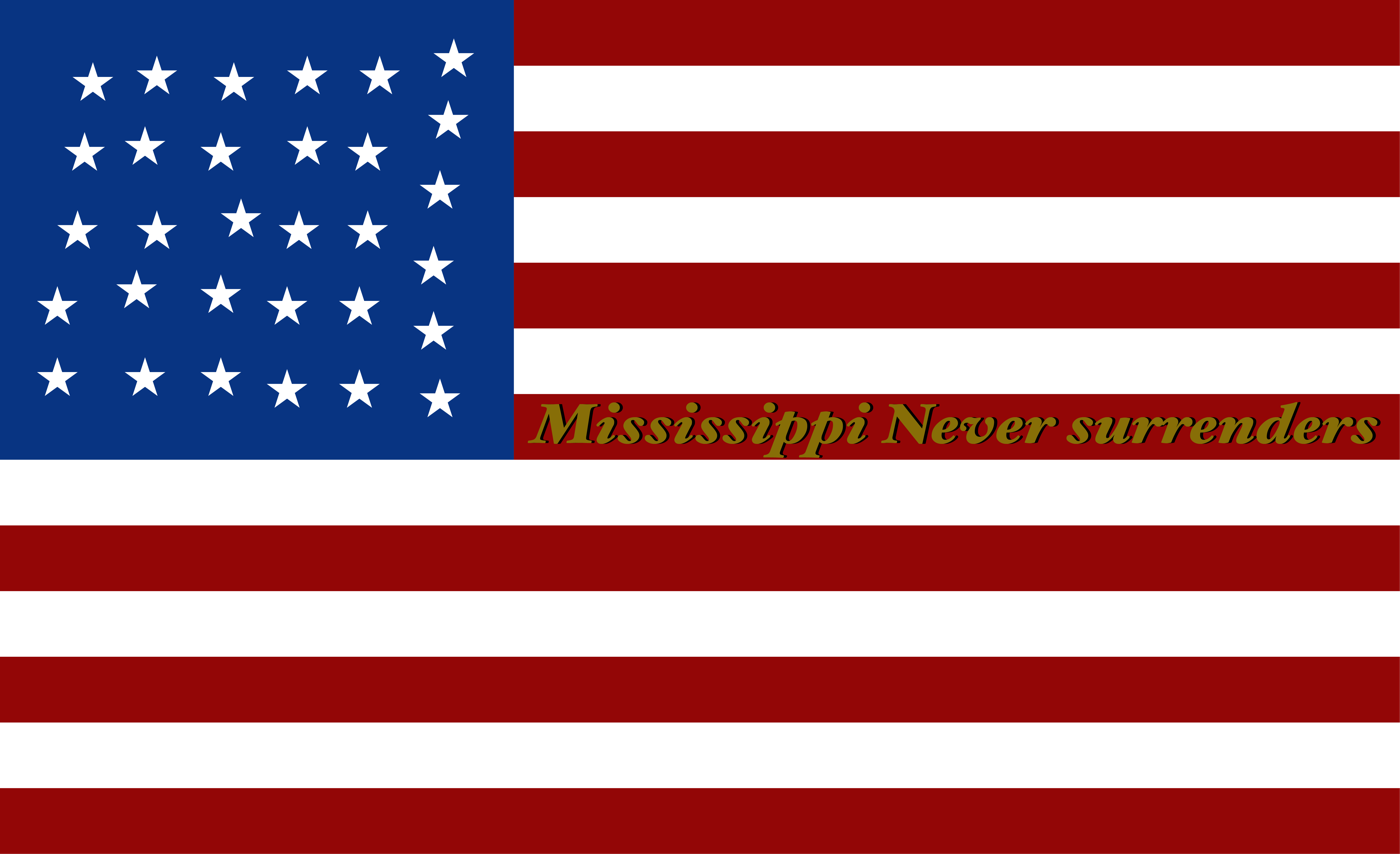
Reconstruction of the flag carried by state delegates during the 1856 Whig National Convention

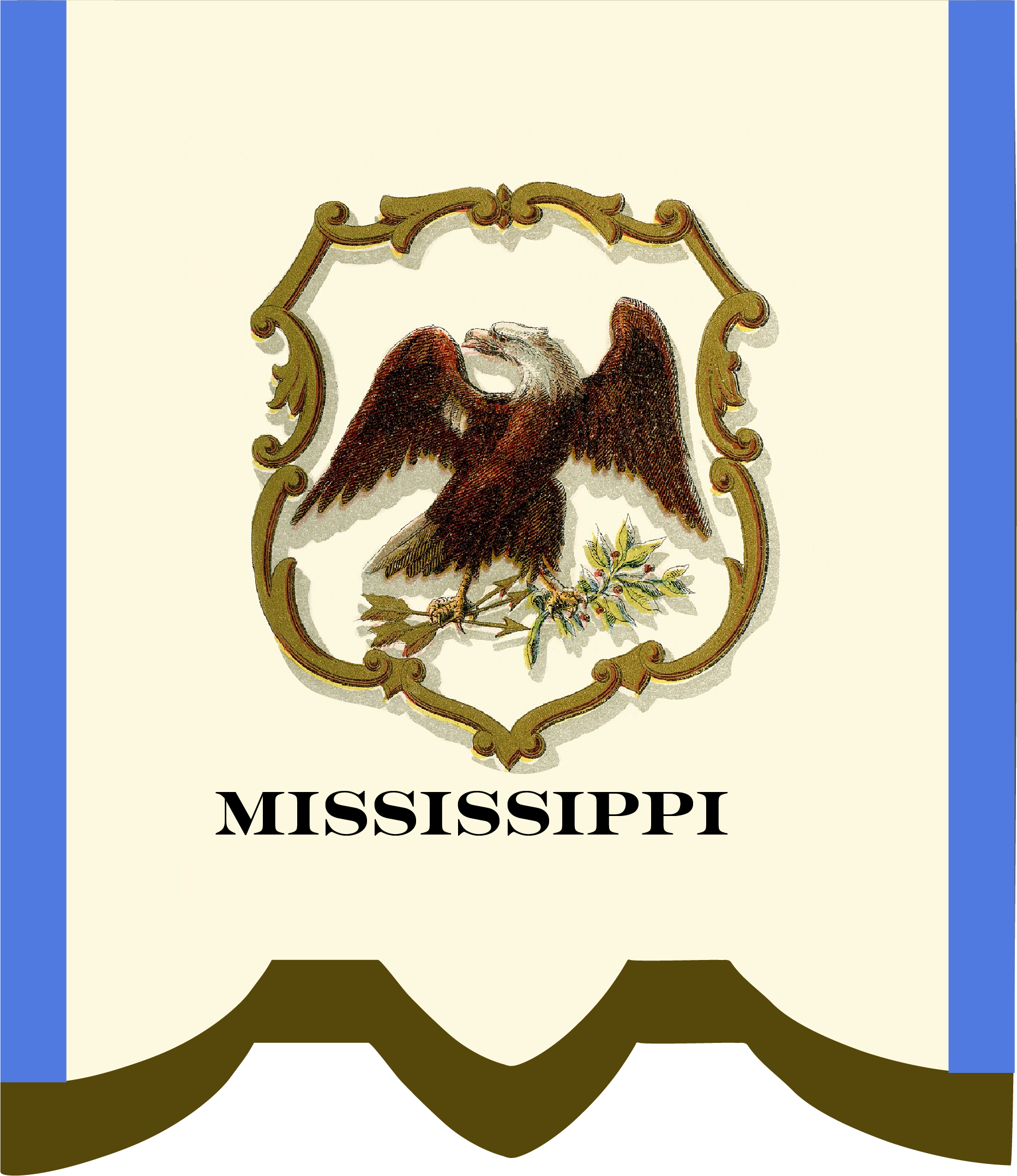
Unofficial banner used by state delegates at the 1872 Republican National Convention

== See also ==
- List of flags of Mississippi
- List of flags by design
- List of Mississippi state symbols
- List of U.S. state, district, and territorial insignia
- Flags of the Confederate States of America
