= Monty Python =

British surreal comedy group

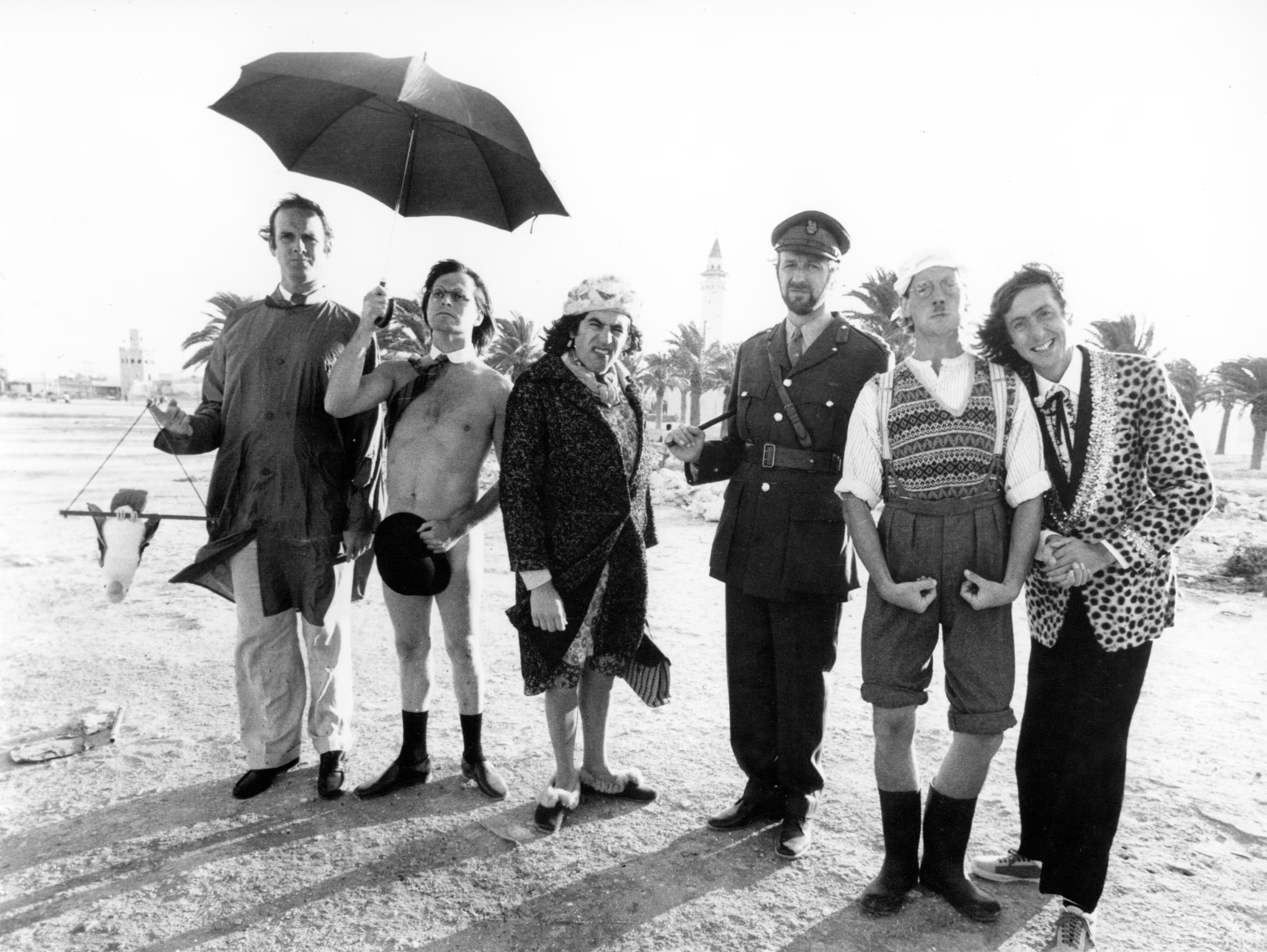
- Monty Python in 1978. Left to right: Cleese, Gilliam, Jones, Chapman, Palin and Idle

Comedy career
- Years active: 1969–1983; 1989; 1998–1999; 2002; 2009; 2013–2014
- Medium: Television; film; theatre; literature; audio
- Genres: Satire; surreal humour; black comedy; wordplay; wit; sketch comedy; surrealism
- Former members: Graham Chapman; John Cleese; Terry Gilliam; Eric Idle; Terry Jones; Michael Palin
- Website: montypython.com

Monty Python, also known as the Pythons, were a British comedy troupe formed in 1969 consisting of Graham Chapman, John Cleese, Terry Gilliam, Eric Idle, Terry Jones and Michael Palin. The group initially came to prominence in the UK for the sketch comedy television series Monty Python's Flying Circus, which aired on the BBC from 1969 to 1974. Their work then developed into a larger collection that included live shows, films, albums, books, and musicals; their influence on comedy has been compared to the Beatles' influence on music. Their sketch show has been called "an important moment in the evolution of television comedy".

Monty Python's Flying Circus was loosely structured as a sketch show, but its innovative stream of consciousness approach and Gilliam's animation skills pushed the boundaries of what was acceptable in style and content. A self-contained comedy unit, the Pythons had creative control that allowed them to experiment with form and content, discarding rules of television comedy. They followed their television work by making the films Monty Python and the Holy Grail (1975), Life of Brian (1979), and The Meaning of Life (1983). Their influence on British comedy has been apparent for years, while it has coloured the work of the early editions of Saturday Night Live through to absurdist trends in television comedy.

At the 41st British Academy Film Awards in 1988, Monty Python received the BAFTA Award for Outstanding British Contribution to Cinema. In 1998, they were awarded the AFI Star Award by the American Film Institute. Holy Grail and Life of Brian are frequently ranked on lists of the greatest comedy films. A 2005 poll asked more than 300 comedians, comedy writers, producers, and directors to name the greatest comedians of all time, and half of Monty Python's members made the top 50.

== History ==
=== Before Flying Circus ===
Jones and Palin met at Oxford University, where they performed together with the Oxford Revue. Chapman and Cleese met at Cambridge University. Idle was also at Cambridge, but started a year after Chapman and Cleese. Cleese met Gilliam in New York City while on tour with the Cambridge University Footlights revue Cambridge Circus (originally entitled A Clump of Plinths). Chapman, Cleese, and Idle were members of the Footlights, which at that time also included the future Goodies (Tim Brooke-Taylor, Bill Oddie, and Graeme Garden), and Jonathan Lynn (co-writer of Yes Minister and Yes, Prime Minister). During Idle's presidency of the club, feminist writer Germaine Greer and broadcaster Clive James were members. Recordings of Footlights' revues (called "Smokers") at Pembroke College include sketches and performances by Cleese and Idle, which, along with tapes of Idle's performances in some of the drama society's theatrical productions, are kept in the archives of the Pembroke Players.

The six Python members appeared in or wrote these shows before Flying Circus:

- I'm Sorry, I'll Read That Again (radio) (1964–1973): Cleese (cast member and writer), Idle and Chapman (writers)
- The Frost Report (1966–1967): Cleese (cast member and writer), Idle (writer of David Frost's monologues), Chapman, Palin and Jones (writers)
- At Last the 1948 Show (1967): Chapman and Cleese (writers and cast members), Idle (guest star and writer)
- Twice a Fortnight (1967): Palin and Jones (cast members and writers)
- Do Not Adjust Your Set (1967–1969): Idle, Jones, and Palin (cast members and writers), Gilliam (animation)
- We Have Ways of Making You Laugh (1968): Idle (cast member and writer), Gilliam (animation)
- How to Irritate People (1968): Cleese and Chapman (cast members and writers), Palin (cast member)
- The Complete and Utter History of Britain (1969): Palin and Jones (cast members and writers)
- Doctor in the House (1969), Cleese and Chapman (writers)

The BBC's satirical television show The Frost Report, broadcast from March 1966 to December 1967, is credited as first uniting the British Pythons and providing an environment in which they could develop their particular styles.

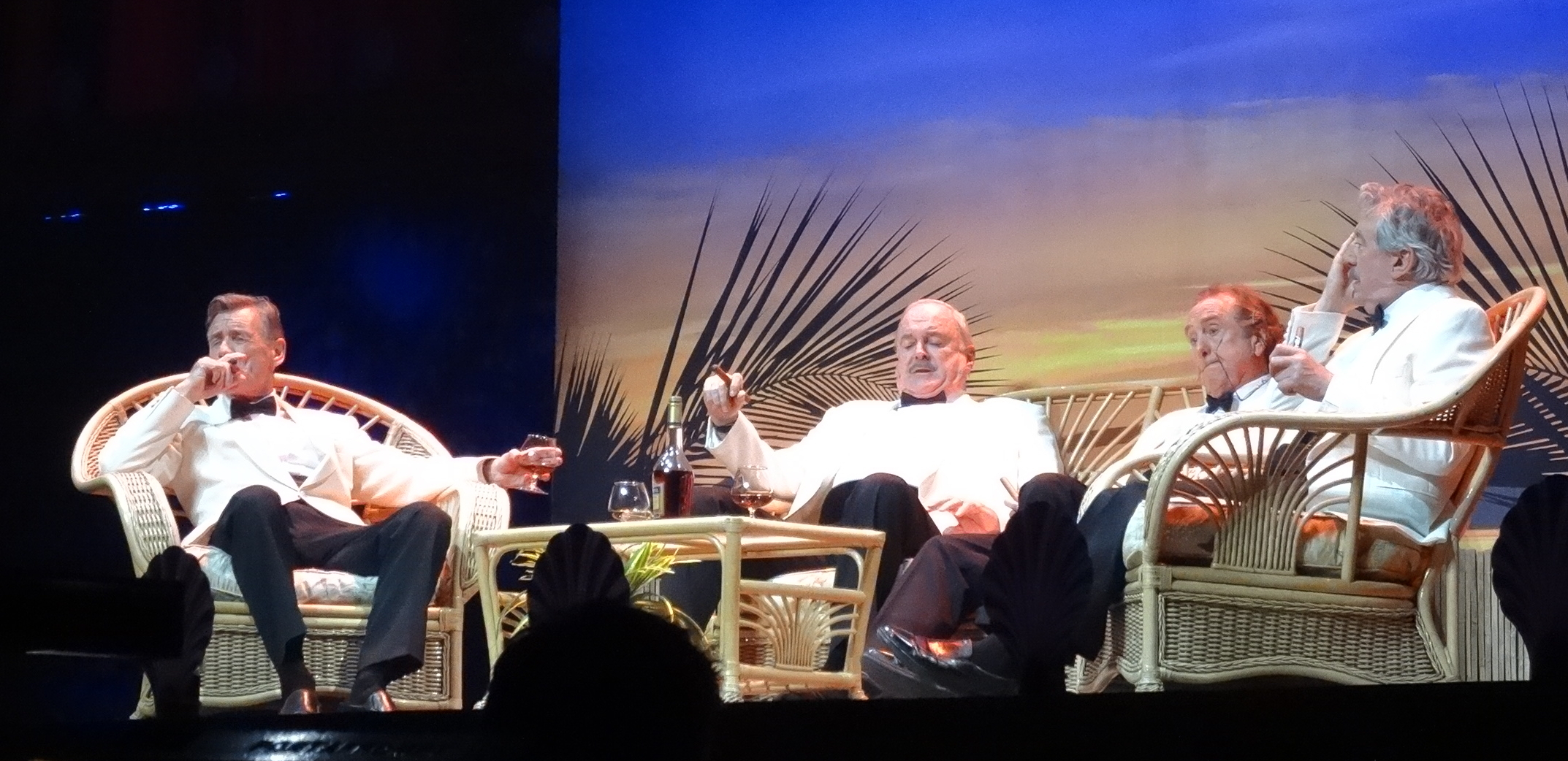
The "Four Yorkshiremen" sketch at the 2014 Monty Python reunion. Written by Cleese, Chapman, Tim Brooke-Taylor and Marty Feldman, it was originally performed on their TV series At Last the 1948 Show in 1967. It parodies nostalgic conversations about humble beginnings or difficult childhoods.

Following the success of Do Not Adjust Your Set (which was broadcast on ITV from December 1967 to May 1969), Thames Television offered Gilliam, Idle, Jones, and Palin their own late-night adult comedy series together. At the same time, Chapman and Cleese were offered a show by the BBC, which had been impressed by their work on The Frost Report and At Last the 1948 Show. Cleese was reluctant to do a two-man show for various reasons, including Chapman's supposedly difficult and erratic personality. Cleese had fond memories of working with Palin on How to Irritate People and invited him to join the team. With no studio available at Thames until summer 1970 for the late-night show, Palin agreed to join Cleese and Chapman, and suggested the involvement of his writing partner Jones and colleague Idle—who in turn wanted Gilliam to provide animations for the projected series. Much has been made of the fact that the Monty Python troupe is the result of Cleese's desire to work with Palin and the chance circumstances that brought the other four members into the fold.

By contrast, according to John Cleese's autobiography, the origins of Monty Python lay in the admiration that writing partners Cleese and Chapman had for the new type of comedy being done on Do Not Adjust Your Set; as a result, a meeting was initiated by Cleese between Chapman, Idle, Jones, Palin, and himself at which it was agreed to pool their writing and performing efforts and jointly seek production sponsorship. According to their official website, the group was born from a Kashmir tandoori restaurant in Hampstead on 11 May 1969, following a taping of Do Not Adjust Your Set which Cleese and Chapman attended. It was the first time all six got together, with their first meetings then taking place at Cleese's apartment in Basil Street, Knightsbridge in central London.

=== Monty Python's Flying Circus ===
==== Development of the series ====
"The 1960s satire boom opened up the way for a fresh, inventive generation of young comedy writer-performers to flourish on TV and to take comedy in a new and exciting direction."

— BBC profile for Monty Python's Flying Circus.

According to show director Ian MacNaughton, the first discussion about Monty Python's Flying Circus occurred when BBC comedy advisor Barry Took gathered MacNaughton, the Pythons and John Howard Davies (director of the first four episodes) in a conference room at the BBC Television Centre. The Pythons had a definite idea about what they wanted to do with the series. They were admirers of the work of Peter Cook, Alan Bennett, Jonathan Miller, and Dudley Moore on Beyond the Fringe—seminal to the British "satire boom"—and had worked on Frost, which was similar in style.

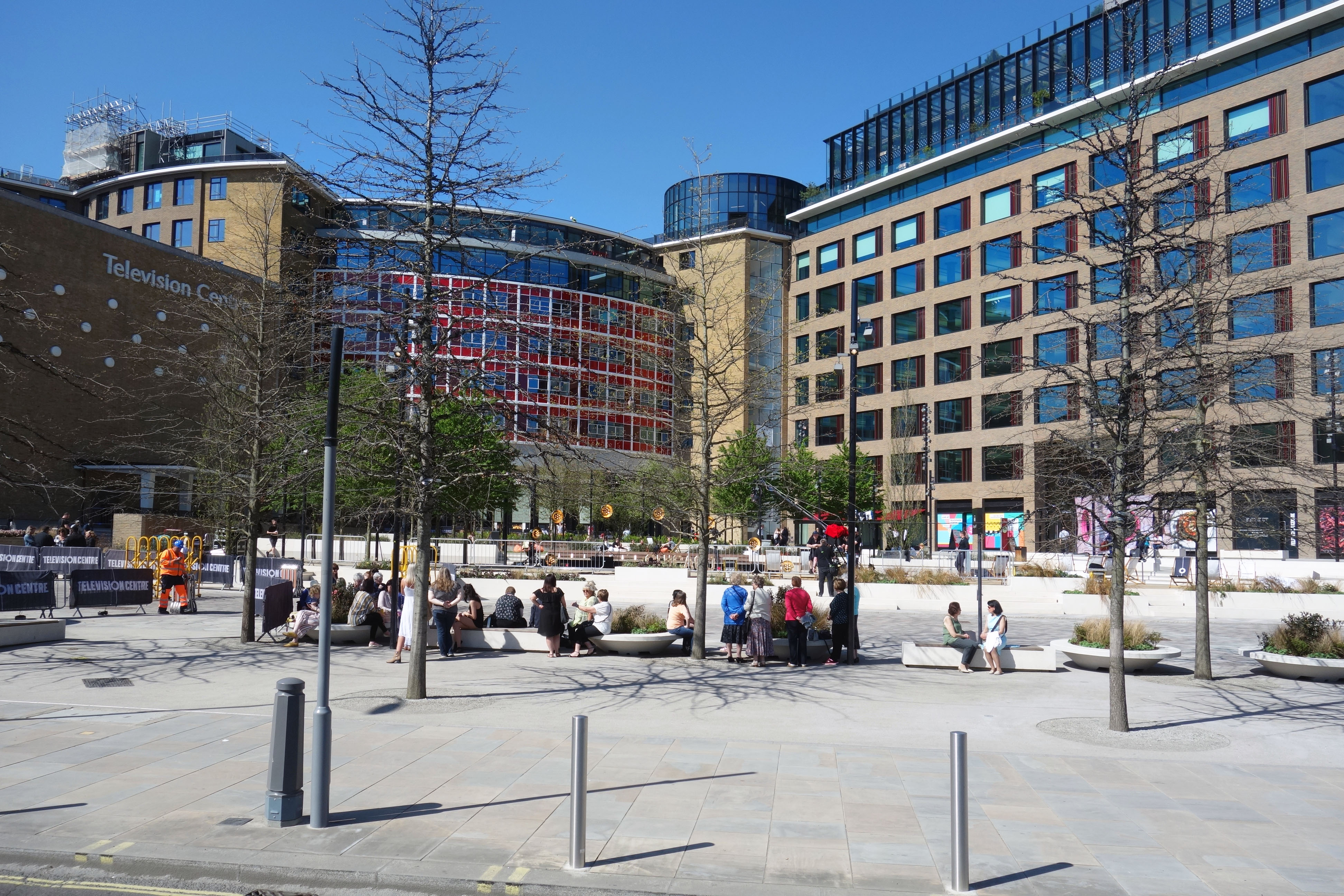
Monty Python's Flying Circus was recorded at BBC Television Centre in west London (pictured) and on location around the UK. It debuted on the BBC on 5 October 1969.

They enjoyed Cook and Moore's sketch show Not Only... But Also. One problem the Pythons perceived with these programmes was that though the body of the sketch would be strong, the writers would often struggle to find a punchline funny enough to end on, and this would detract from the overall sketch quality. They decided that they would simply not bother to "cap" their sketches in the traditional manner, and early episodes of the Flying Circus series make great play of this abandonment of the punchline (one scene has Cleese turn to Idle, as the sketch descends into chaos, and remark that "This is the silliest sketch I've ever been in"—they all resolve not to carry on and simply walk off the set). However, as they began assembling material for the show, the Pythons watched one of their heroes, Spike Milligan, whom they had admired on The Goon Show (a show the Pythons regard as their biggest influence) recording his groundbreaking BBC series Q... (1969). Not only was Q... more irreverent and anarchic than any previous television comedy, but Milligan also would often "give up" on sketches halfway through and wander off set (often muttering "Did I write this?"). It was clear that their new series would now seem less original, and Jones in particular became determined the Pythons should innovate. Michael Palin recalls "Terry Jones and I adored the Q... shows...[Milligan] was the first writer to play with the conventions of television." Charles Isherwood writes that the Pythons "derived their sketch formats in part from the rowdy tradition of the music hall." Cleese has said that the show will seem more innovative to modern viewers than it actually was, because several programmes that were influences on it were mostly destroyed due to BBC policy at the time to not keep most programmes it made.

After much debate, Jones remembered an animation Gilliam had created for Do Not Adjust Your Set called "Beware of the Elephants", which had intrigued him with its stream-of-consciousness style. Jones felt it would be a good concept to apply to the series: allowing sketches to blend into one another. Palin had been equally fascinated by another of Gilliam's efforts, entitled "Christmas Cards", and agreed that it represented "a way of doing things differently". Since Cleese, Chapman, and Idle were less concerned with the overall flow of the programme, Jones, Palin, and Gilliam became largely responsible for the presentation style of the Flying Circus series, in which disparate sketches are linked to give each episode the appearance of a single stream-of-consciousness (often using a Gilliam animation to move from the closing image of one sketch to the opening scene of another). The BBC states, "Gilliam's unique animation style became crucial, segueing seamlessly between any two completely unrelated ideas and making the stream-of-consciousness work."

Writing started at 9:00 a.m. and finished at 5:00 p.m. Typically, Cleese and Chapman worked as one pair isolated from the others, as did Jones and Palin, while Idle wrote alone. After a few days, they would join with Gilliam, critique their scripts, and exchange ideas. Their approach to writing was democratic. If the majority found an idea humorous, it was included in the show. The casting of roles for the sketches was a similarly unselfish process, since each member viewed himself primarily as a "writer", rather than an actor eager for screen time. When the themes for sketches were chosen, Gilliam had a free hand in bridging them with animations, using a camera, scissors, and airbrush.

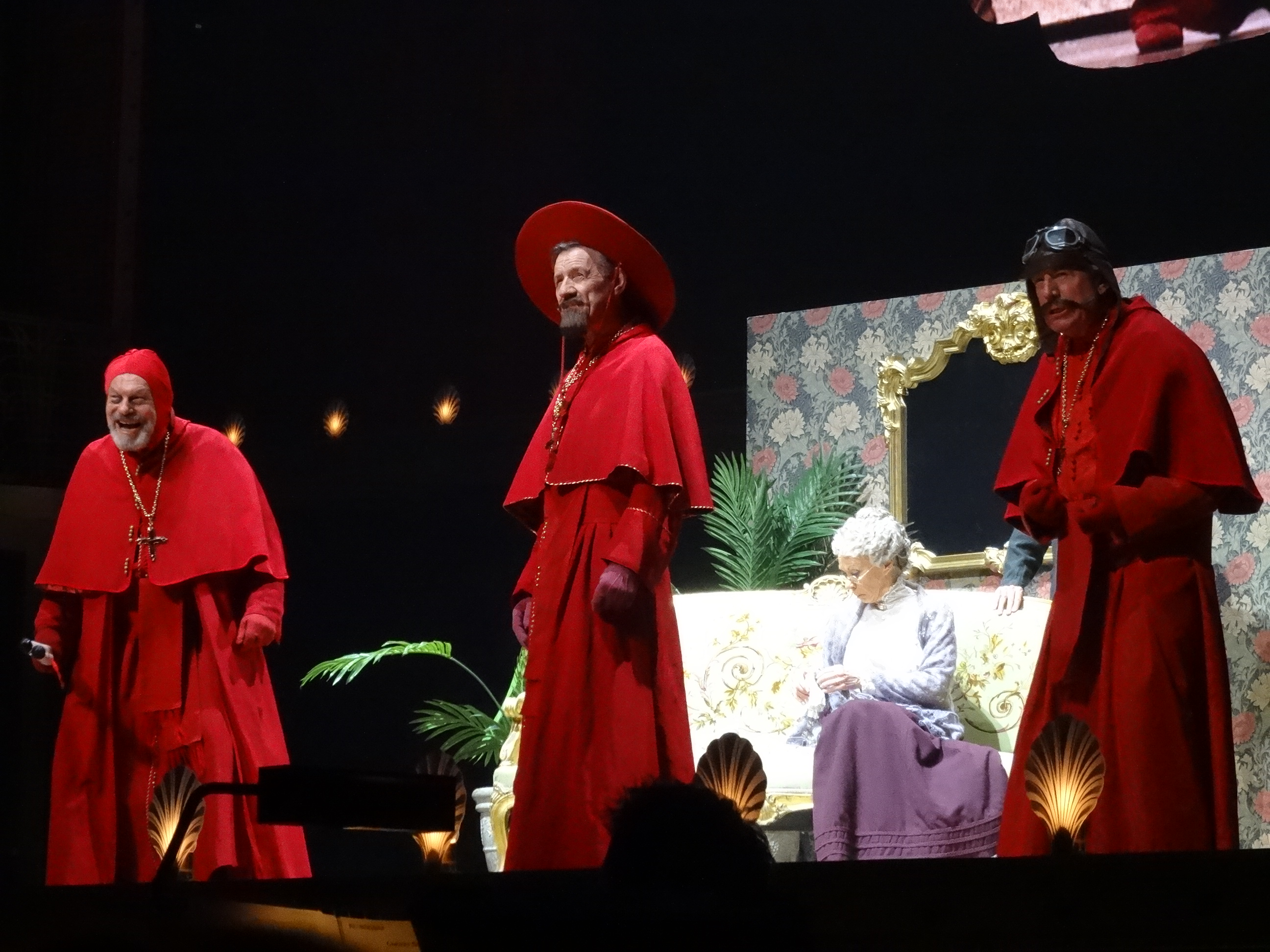
"The Spanish Inquisition" sketch performed by Gilliam, Palin and Jones at the 2014 Python reunion. As a sketch writer and creator of animations, Gilliam did considerably less acting, but did have some notable roles such as Cardinal Fang here.

While the show was a collaborative process, different factions within Python were responsible for elements of the team's humour. In general, the work of Jones and Palin was more visual and more based on fanciful concepts—such as the arrival of the Spanish Inquisition in a suburban home—while the sketches of Cleese, Chapman and Idle tended to be more verbal and more aggressive (for example, Cleese and Chapman's "confrontation" sketches, where one character intimidates or hurls abuse, or Idle's characters with bizarre verbal quirks, such as "The Man Who Speaks In Anagrams"). Cleese confirmed that "most of the sketches with heavy abuse were Graham's and mine, anything that started with a slow pan across countryside and impressive music was Mike and Terry's, and anything that got utterly involved with words and disappeared up any personal orifice was Eric's". Gilliam's animations ranged from the whimsical to the savage, with the cartoon format allowing him to create extremely violent scenes without fear of censorship.

Several names for the show were considered before Monty Python's Flying Circus was settled upon. Some were Owl Stretching Time; The Toad Elevating Moment; A Horse, a Spoon and a Basin; Vaseline Review; and Bun, Wackett, Buzzard, Stubble and Boot. Reportedly, these names were considered for the show because the group members found it funny that the show name would have nothing to do with the actual content of the series. Flying Circus stuck when the BBC explained it had printed that name in its schedules and was not prepared to amend it. Gwen Dibley's Flying Circus was named after a woman Palin had read about in the newspaper, thinking it would be amusing if she were to discover she had her own TV show. Baron Von Took's Flying Circus was considered as an affectionate tribute to Barry Took, the man who had brought them together. Arthur Megapode's Flying Circus was suggested, then discarded. The name Baron Von Took's Flying Circus had the form of Baron Manfred von Richthofen's Flying Circus of WWI fame, and the new group was forming in a time when the Royal Guardsmen's 1966 song "Snoopy vs. the Red Baron" had peaked. The term 'flying circus' was also another name for the popular entertainment of the 1920s known as barnstorming, where multiple performers collaborated with their stunts to perform a combined set of acts.

Differing accounts are given of the origins of the name "Monty Python", although the members agree that its only "significance" was that they thought it sounded funny. In the 1998 documentary Live at Aspen during the US Comedy Arts Festival, where the troupe was awarded the AFI Star Award by the American Film Institute, the group implied that "Monty" was selected (Eric Idle's idea) as a gently mocking tribute to Field Marshal Lord Montgomery, a British general of World War II; requiring a "slippery-sounding" surname, they settled on "Python". On other occasions, Idle has claimed that the name "Monty" was that of a popular and rotund fellow who drank in his local pub; people would often walk in and ask the barman, "Has Monty been in yet?", forcing the name to become stuck in his mind. The name Monty Python was later described by the BBC as being "envisaged by the team as the perfect name for a sleazy entertainment agent".

==== Style of the show ====
Flying Circus popularised innovative formal techniques, such as the cold open, in which an episode began without the traditional opening titles or announcements. An example of this is the "It's" man: Palin, outfitted in Robinson Crusoe garb, making a tortuous journey across various terrains, before finally approaching the camera to state, "It's ...", to be then interrupted by the title sequence and theme music. On several occasions, the cold open lasted until mid-show, after which the regular opening titles ran. Occasionally, the Pythons tricked viewers by rolling the closing credits halfway through the show, usually continuing the joke by fading to the familiar globe logo used for BBC continuity, over which Cleese would parody the clipped tones of a BBC announcer. On one occasion, the credits ran directly after the opening titles. On the subversive nature of the show (and their subsequent films), Cleese states "anti-authoritarianism was deeply ingrained in Python".

"Our first rule was: no punchlines. [Some sketches] start brilliant, great acting, really funny sketch, but the punchline is just not as good as the rest of the sketch, so it kills the entire thing. That's why we eliminated them."

— Terry Gilliam in 2007.

Because of their dislike of finishing with punchlines, they experimented with ending the sketches by cutting abruptly to another scene or animation, walking offstage, addressing the camera (breaking the fourth wall), or introducing a totally unrelated event or character. A classic example of this approach was the use of Chapman's "anti-silliness" character of "the Colonel", who walked into several sketches and ordered them to be stopped because things were becoming "far too silly".

Another favourite way of ending sketches was to drop a cartoonish "16-ton weight" prop on one of the characters when the sketch seemed to be losing momentum, or a knight in full armour (played by Terry Gilliam) would wander on-set and hit characters over the head with a rubber chicken, before cutting to the next scene. Yet another way of changing scenes was when John Cleese, usually outfitted in a dinner suit, would come in as a radio commentator and, in a rather pompous manner, make the formal and determined announcement "And now for something completely different.", which later became the title of the first Monty Python film.

The Python theme music is the Band of the Grenadier Guards' rendition of John Philip Sousa's "The Liberty Bell" which was first published in 1893. Under the Berne Convention's "country of origin" concept, the composition was subject to United States copyright law which states that any work first published prior to 1924 was in the public domain, owing to copyright expiration. This enabled Gilliam to co-opt the march for the series without having to make any royalty payments.

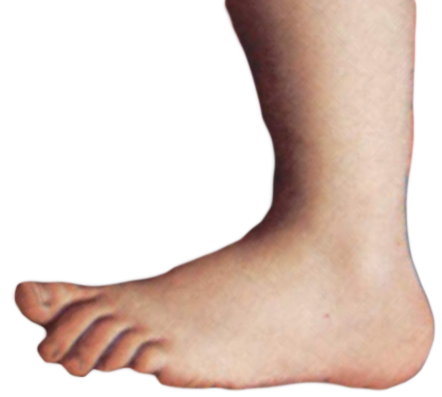
Cupid's foot, as used by Monty Python's Flying Circus. A trademark of Gilliam's stop-motion animation, the giant foot would suddenly squash things, including the show's title at the end of the opening credits.

The use of Gilliam's surreal, collage stop motion animations was another innovative intertextual element of the Python style. Many of the images Gilliam used were lifted from famous works of art, and from Victorian illustrations and engravings. The giant foot that crushes the show's title at the end of the opening credits is the foot of Cupid, cut from a reproduction of the Renaissance masterpiece Venus, Cupid, Folly and Time by Bronzino. This foot, and Gilliam's style in general, are visual trademarks of the programme.

The Pythons used the British tradition of cross-dressing comedy by donning frocks and makeup and playing female roles themselves while speaking in falsetto. Jones specialised in playing the working-class housewife, or "ratbag old women" as termed by the BBC. Palin and Idle generally played the role more posh, with Idle playing more feminine women. Cleese played female roles more sparsely, while Chapman was frequently paired with Jones as a ratbag woman or with Idle portraying middle-class women commenting upon TV. Generally speaking, female roles were played by women only when the scene specifically required that the character be sexually attractive (although sometimes they used Idle for this). The troupe later turned to Carol Cleveland—often described as the unofficial seventh member—who co-starred in numerous episodes after 1970. In some episodes, and later in the stoning scene in Monty Python's Life of Brian, they took the idea one step further by playing women who impersonated men.

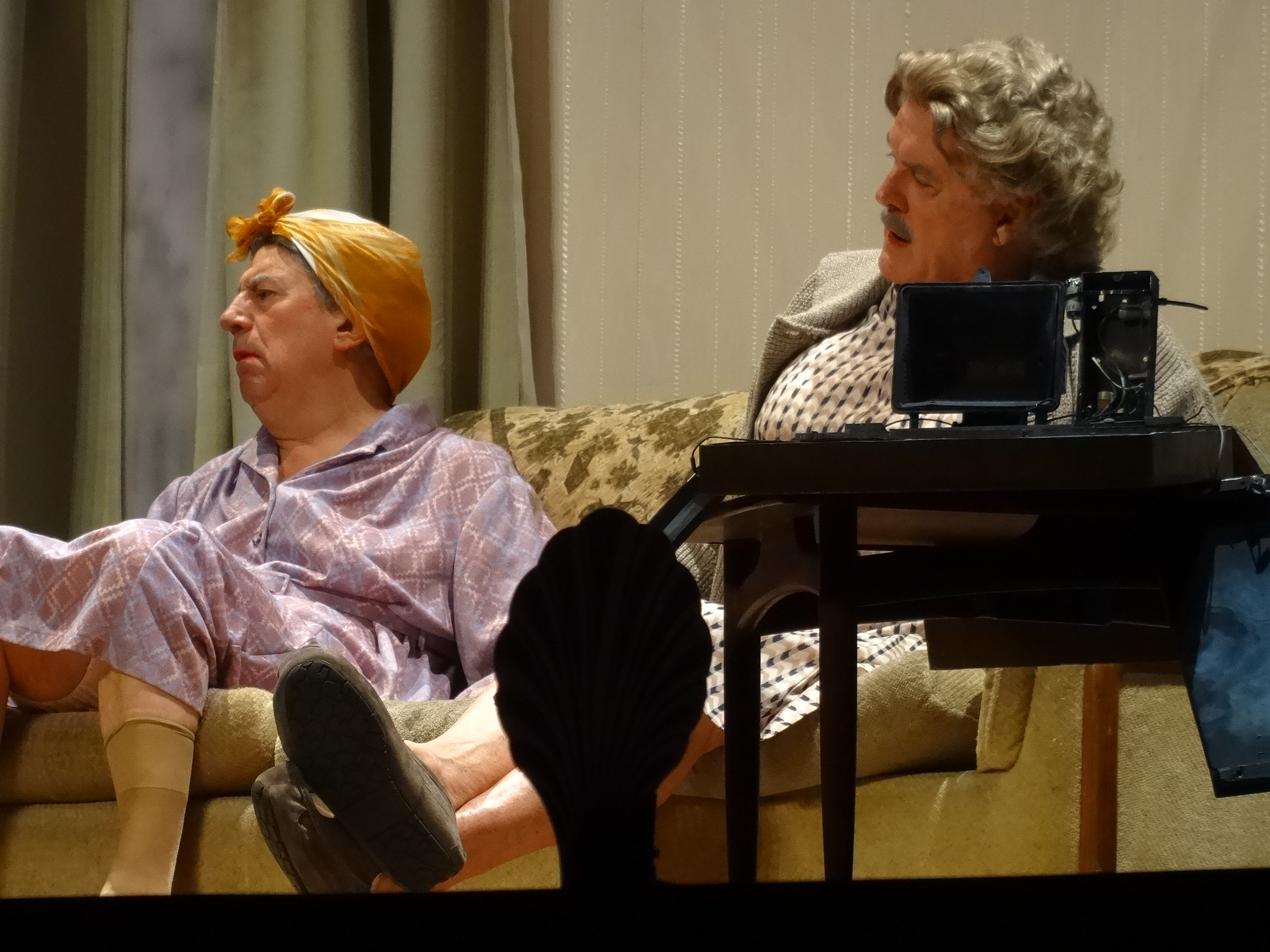
Jones and Cleese as housewives in the 2014 reunion. Playing Brian Cohen's mother in Life of Brian, Jones delivered the line, "He's not the Messiah, he's a very naughty boy!".

Many sketches are well-known and widely quoted. "Dead Parrot sketch", "The Lumberjack Song", "Spam" (which led to the coining of the term email spam), "Nudge Nudge", "The Spanish Inquisition", "Upper Class Twit of the Year", "Cheese Shop", "The Ministry of Silly Walks", "Argument Clinic", "The Funniest Joke in the World" (a sketch referenced in Google Translate), and "Four Yorkshiremen" are just a few examples. Most of the show's sketches satirise areas of public life, such as: Dead Parrot (poor customer service), Silly Walks (bureaucratic inefficiency), Spam (ubiquity of Spam post World War II), and Four Yorkshiremen (nostalgic conversations). Featuring regularly in skits, Gumbys (characters of limited intelligence and vocabulary) were part of the Pythons' satirical view of television of the 1970s which condescendingly encouraged more involvement from the "man on the street".

==== Introduction to North America and the world ====
The Canadian Broadcasting Corporation (CBC) added Monty Python's Flying Circus to its national September 1970 fall line-up. They aired the 13 episodes of series 1, which had first run on the BBC the previous autumn (October 1969 to January 1970), as well as the first six episodes of series 2 only a few weeks after they first appeared on the BBC (September to November 1970). The CBC dropped the show when it returned to regular programming after the Christmas 1970 break, choosing to not place the remaining seven episodes of series 2 on the January 1971 CBC schedule. Within a week, the CBC received hundreds of calls complaining of the cancellation, and more than 100 people staged a demonstration at the CBC's Montreal studios. The show eventually returned, becoming a fixture on the network during the first half of the 1970s.

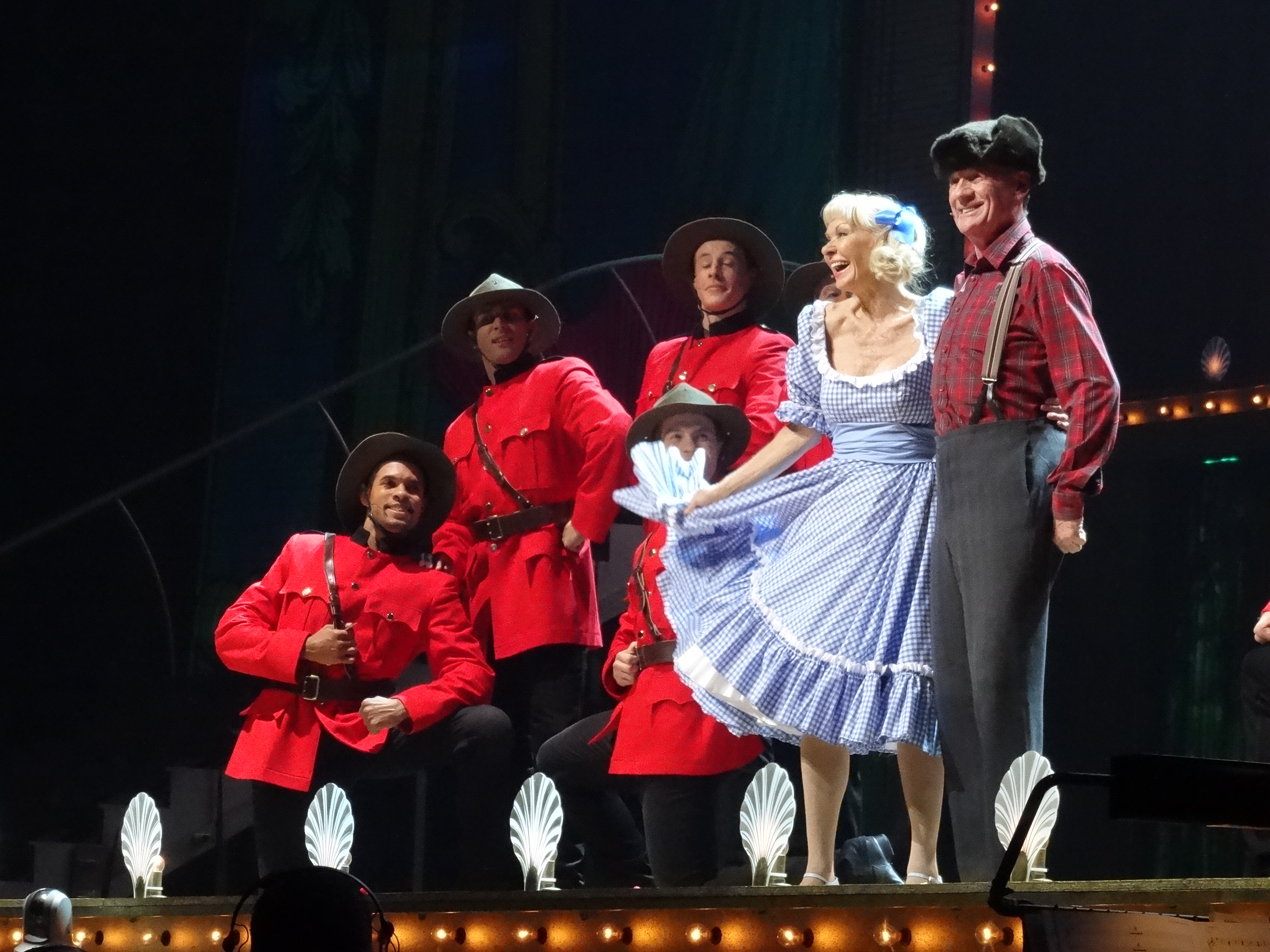
"The Lumberjack Song" with Palin (right) and Carol Cleveland at the 2014 reunion. It appeared in the ninth episode of Monty Python's Flying Circus.

Sketches from Monty Python's Flying Circus were introduced to American audiences in August 1972, with the release of the Python film And Now for Something Completely Different, featuring sketches from series 1 and 2 of the television show. This 1972 release met with limited box office success.

The ability to show Monty Python's Flying Circus under the American NTSC standard had been made possible by the commercial actions of American television producer Greg Garrison. Garrison produced the NBC series The Dean Martin Comedy World, which ran during the summer of 1974. The concept was to show clips from comedy shows produced in other countries, including tape of the Python sketches "Bicycle Repairman" and "The Dull Life of a Stockbroker".

Through the efforts of Python's American manager Nancy Lewis, during the summer of 1974, Ron Devillier, the programming director for nonprofit PBS television station KERA in Dallas, Texas, started airing episodes of Monty Python's Flying Circus. Ratings shot through the roof, prompting other PBS affiliates to pick up the show. Devillier states, "We got the Nielsens in and started looking at the Saturday ratings. The first night, it was a 6 rating. We couldn't believe it. We didn't know what a 6 looked like. The next week, it was a 7 and it may have taken a month but it stayed there and we started getting 8s, 9s and 10s." There was also cross-promotion from FM radio stations across the US, whose airing of tracks from the Python LPs had already introduced American audiences to this bizarre brand of comedy. The popularity on PBS resulted in the 1974 re-release of the 1972 ...Completely Different film, with much greater box office success. The success of the show was captured by a March 1975 article headline in The New York Times, "Monty Python's Flying Circus Is Barnstorming Here". Asked what challenges were left, now that they had made TV shows, films, written books, and produced records, Chapman responded, "Well, actually world supremacy would be very nice", before Idle cautioned, "Yes, but that sort of thing has got to be done properly".

"When [Monty Python] hit the airwaves, it really was quite shocking but it was shocking in a good way. It set you up right and opened up a whole new form of comedy. 'Pythonesque."

— Ron Devillier, PBS programming director.

In 1975 ABC broadcast two 90-minute Monty Python specials, each with three shows, but cut out a total of 24 minutes from each, in part to make time for commercials, and in part to avoid upsetting their audience. As the judge observed in Gilliam v. American Broadcasting Companies, Inc., where Monty Python sued for damages caused by broadcast of the mutilated version, "According to the network, appellants should have anticipated that most of the excised material contained scatological references inappropriate for American television and that these scenes would be replaced with commercials, which presumably are more palatable to the American public." Monty Python won the case.

With the popularity of Python throughout the rest of the 1970s and through most of the 1980s, PBS stations looked at other British comedies, leading to UK shows such as Are You Being Served? gaining a US audience, and leading, over time, to many PBS stations having a "British Comedy Night" which airs many popular UK comedies.

In 1976, Monty Python became the top rated show in Japan after airing on Tokyo Channel 12. The popularity of the show in the Netherlands saw the town of Spijkenisse near Rotterdam open a 'silly walks' road crossing in 2018. Believed to be a world first, the official sign asks pedestrians to cross the road in a comical manner.

==== Departure of Cleese ====
Having considered the possibility at the end of the second series, Cleese left the Flying Circus at the end of the third. He later explained that he felt he no longer had anything fresh to offer the show, and claimed that only two sketches penned by Cleese and Chapman in the third series ("Dennis Moore" and the "Cheese Shop") were truly original, and that the others were bits and pieces from previous work cobbled together in slightly different contexts. He was also finding Chapman, who was at that point in the full throes of alcoholism, difficult to work with. According to an interview with Idle, "It was on an Air Canada flight on the way to Toronto, when John (Cleese) turned to all of us and said 'I want out.' Why? I don't know. He gets bored more easily than the rest of us. He's a difficult man, not easy to be friendly with. He's so funny because he never wanted to be liked. That gives him a certain fascinating, arrogant freedom." The rest of the group carried on for one more "half" season before calling a halt to the programme in 1974. While the first three seasons contained 13 episodes each, the fourth ended after just six. The name Monty Python's Flying Circus appears in the opening animation for season four, but in the end credits, the show is listed as simply Monty Python. Although Cleese left the show, he was credited as a writer for three of the six episodes, largely concentrated in the "Michael Ellis" episode, which had begun life as one of the many drafts of the "Holy Grail" motion picture. When a new direction for "Grail" was decided upon, the subplot of Arthur and his knights wandering around a strange department store in modern times was lifted out and recycled as the aforementioned TV episode. The songwriter Neil Innes contributed to some sketches, including "Appeal on Behalf of Very Rich People".

=== Films ===
==== And Now for Something Completely Different (1971) ====
The Pythons' first feature film was directed by Ian MacNaughton, reprising his role from the television series. It consisted of sketches from the first two seasons of the Flying Circus, reshot on a low budget (and often slightly edited) for cinema release. Material selected for the film includes: "Dead Parrot", "The Lumberjack Song", "Upper Class Twit of the Year", "Hell's Grannies", "Self-Defence Class", "How Not to Be Seen", and "Nudge Nudge". Financed by Playboy's UK executive Victor Lownes, it was intended as a way of breaking Monty Python into America, and although it was ultimately unsuccessful in this, the film did good business in the UK, and later in the US on the "Midnight movie" circuit after their breakthrough television and film success, this being in the era before home video would make the original material much more accessible. The group did not consider the film a success as it recycled sketches from Flying Circus rather than feature original material, and they found the production under MacNaughton frustrating, with Justin Smith writing in British Comedy Cinema it "served to strengthen their determination to take control of their own project".

==== Monty Python and the Holy Grail (1975) ====
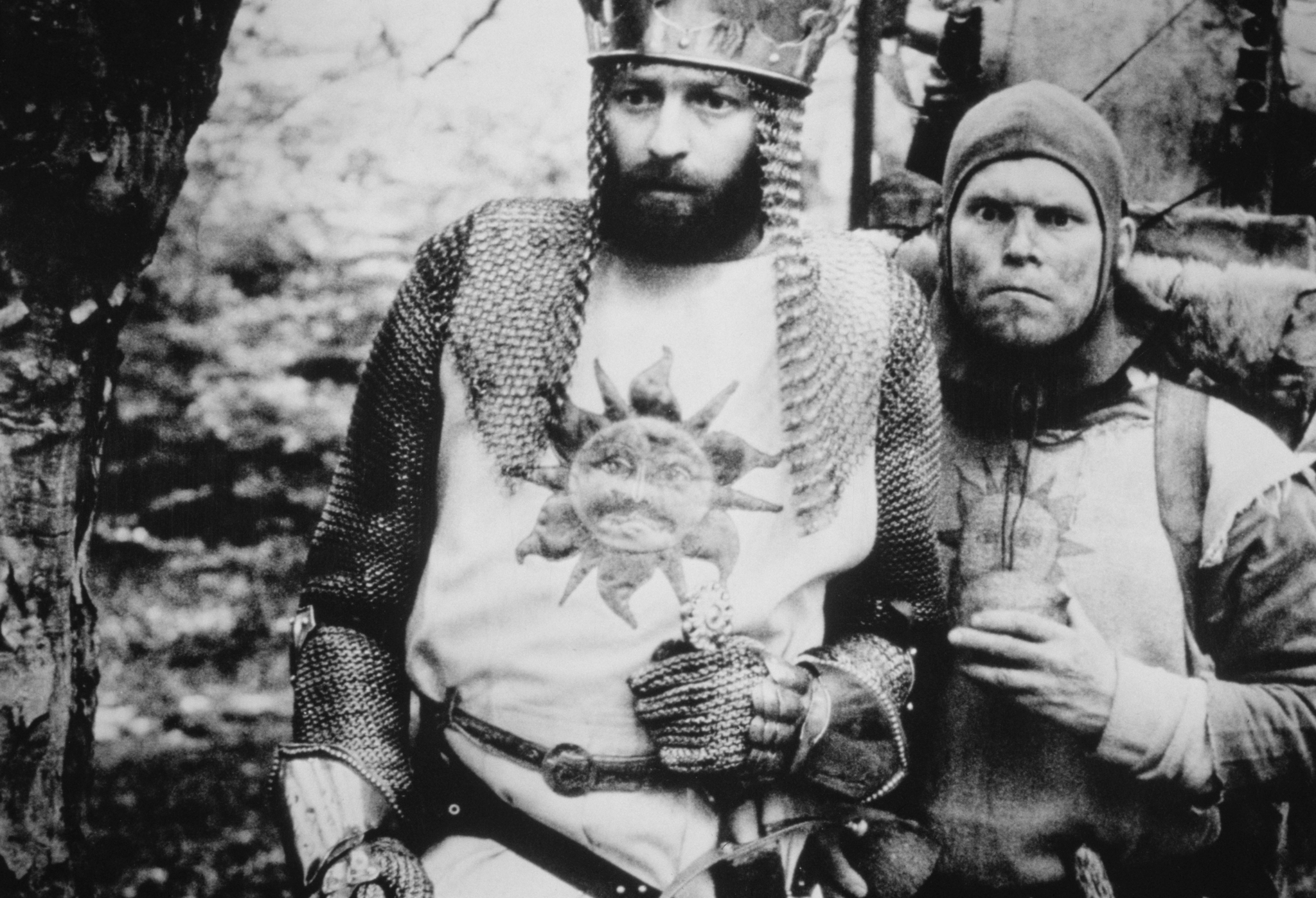
Chapman and Gilliam as King Arthur and Patsy respectively in a promotional photo for Holy Grail

In 1974, between production on the third and fourth series, the group decided to embark on their first "proper" feature film, containing entirely new material. Monty Python and the Holy Grail was based on Arthurian legend and was directed by Jones and Gilliam. Again, the latter also contributed linking animations (and put together the opening credits). Along with the rest of the Pythons, Jones and Gilliam performed several roles in the film, but Chapman took the lead as King Arthur. Cleese returned to the group for the film, feeling that they were once again breaking new ground. Holy Grail was filmed on location, in picturesque rural areas of Scotland, with a budget of only £229,000; the money was raised in part with investments from rock groups such as Pink Floyd, Jethro Tull, and Led Zeppelin, as well as UK music industry entrepreneur Tony Stratton Smith (founder and owner of the Charisma Records label, for which the Pythons recorded their comedy albums).

The backers of the film wanted to cut the famous Black Knight scene (a Sam Peckinpah send-up in which the Black Knight loses his limbs in a duel), but it was eventually kept in the film. "Tis but a scratch" and "It's just a flesh wound…" are often quoted. Holy Grail was selected as the second-best comedy of all time in the ABC special Best in Film: The Greatest Movies of Our Time. and viewers in a Channel 4 poll placed it sixth.

==== Monty Python's Life of Brian (1979) ====
Following the success of Holy Grail, reporters asked for the title of the next Python film, though the team had not even begun to consider a third one. Eventually, Idle flippantly replied "Jesus Christ – Lust for Glory", which became the group's stock answer to such questions. However, they soon began to seriously consider a film lampooning the New Testament era in the same way Holy Grail had lampooned Arthurian legend. Despite sharing a distrust of organised religion, they agreed not to mock Jesus or his teachings directly. They also mentioned that they could not think of anything legitimate to make fun of about him. Instead, they decided to write a satire on credulity and hypocrisy among the followers of someone [Brian] who had been mistaken for the "Messiah", but who had no desire to be followed as such. Terry Jones adds it was a satire on those who for the next 2,000 years "couldn't agree on what Jesus was saying about peace and love".

"We are three wise men."
"Well, what are you doing creeping around a cow shed at two o'clock in the morning? That doesn't sound very wise to me."

— Early scene from Life of Brian.

The focus therefore shifted to a separate individual, Brian Cohen, born at the same time, and in a neighbouring stable. When Jesus appears in the film (first, as a baby in the stable, and then later on the Mount, speaking the Beatitudes), he is played straight (by actor Kenneth Colley) and portrayed with respect. The comedy begins when members of the crowd mishear his statements of peace, love, and tolerance ("I think he said, 'Blessed are the cheesemakers'").

The Roman Amphitheatre of Carthage features in a scene where Reg (played by Cleese) lists off rival factions: the People's Front of Judea, the Judean People's Front, and the Judean Popular People's Front.

Directing duties for Life of Brian were handled solely by Jones, having amicably agreed with Gilliam that Jones' approach to film-making was better suited for Python's general performing style. Holy Grail's production had often been stilted by their differences behind the camera. Gilliam again contributed two animated sequences (one being the opening credits) and took charge of set design. The film was shot on location in Tunisia, the finances being provided this time by The Beatles' George Harrison, who together with Denis O'Brien formed the production company Hand-Made Films for the movie. Harrison had a cameo role as the "owner of the Mount".

Despite its subject matter attracting controversy, particularly upon its initial release, Life of Brian has (together with its predecessor) been ranked among the greatest comedy films. In 2006, it was ranked first on a Channel 4 list of the 50 Greatest Comedy Films. Empire magazine called it "an unrivalled satire on religion". In 2013, Richard Burridge, a theologian decorated by Pope Francis, called it an "extraordinary tribute to the life and work and teaching of Jesus—that they couldn't actually blaspheme or make a joke out of it. They did a great satire on closed minds and people who follow blindly. Then you have them splitting into factions...it is a wonderful satire on the way that Jesus's own teaching has been used to persecute others. They were satirising fundamentalism and persecution of others and at the same time saying the one person who rises above all this was Jesus".

==== Monty Python Live at the Hollywood Bowl (1982) ====
Monty Python performed four consecutive dates at the Hollywood Bowl in Los Angeles in September 1980 during preparations for Meaning of Life. The performances were filmed and released in the concert film, Monty Python Live at the Hollywood Bowl (directed by Terry Hughes), with the Pythons performing sketches from the television series in front of an audience. The released film also incorporated footage from the German television specials (the inclusion of which gives Ian MacNaughton his first on-screen credit for Python since the end of Flying Circus) and live performances of several songs from the troupe's then-current Monty Python's Contractual Obligation Album. Monty Python's four-night stint as headliners at the Hollywood Bowl set a record for a comedy act at the venue; it has since been equalled by Dave Chappelle in May 2022.

==== Monty Python's The Meaning of Life (1983) ====
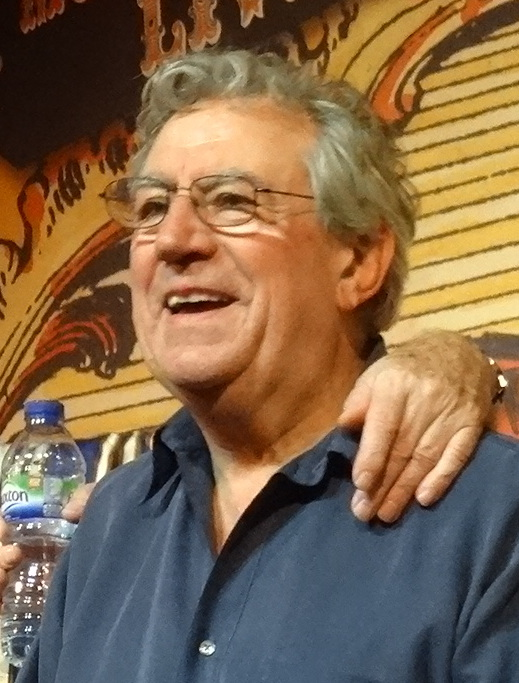
Mr Creosote from The Meaning of Life (played by Terry Jones, pictured) has been called "the ultimate gross-out icon" and the "film's signature" scene.

The Pythons' final film returned to something structurally closer to the style of Flying Circus: a series of sketches loosely follows the ages of man from birth to death. Directed again by Jones solo, The Meaning of Life is embellished with some of the group's most bizarre and disturbing moments, as well as various elaborate musical numbers, which include "Galaxy Song" (performed by Idle) and "Every Sperm Is Sacred" (performed by Palin and Jones). The film is by far their darkest work, containing a great deal of black humour, garnished by some spectacular violence (including an operation to remove a liver from a living patient without anaesthetic and the morbidly obese Mr Creosote exploding over several restaurant patrons after finally giving in to the smooth maître d' telling him to eat a mint – "It's only a wafer-thin mint..."). At the time of its release, the Pythons confessed their aim was to offend "absolutely everyone", adding "It is guaranteed to offend".

The Liver Donor scene (in which a paramedic appears at the door of a living man to take his liver) is a satire on bureaucracy, a common Python trope. Besides the opening credits and the fish sequence, Gilliam, by now an established live-action director, no longer wanted to produce any linking cartoons, offering instead to direct one sketch, "The Crimson Permanent Assurance". Under his helm, though, the segment grew so ambitious and tangential that it was cut from the movie and used as a supporting feature in its own right. (Television screenings also use it as a prologue.) This was the last project on which all six Pythons collaborated, except for the 1989 compilation Parrot Sketch Not Included, where they are all seen sitting in a closet for four seconds. This was the last time Chapman appeared on screen with the Pythons.

Although not as acclaimed as its two predecessors (Holy Grail and Life of Brian), The Meaning of Life was still well received critically and was screened at the 1983 Cannes Film Festival where it won the Grand Prix.

=== Secret Policeman's Ball benefit shows ===
Members of Python contributed their services to charitable endeavours and causes—sometimes as an ensemble, at other times as individuals. The cause that has been the most frequent and consistent beneficiary has been the human rights work of Amnesty International. Between 1976 and 1981, the troupe or its members appeared in four major fund-raisers for Amnesty—known collectively as the Secret Policeman's Ball shows—which were turned into multiple films, TV shows, videos, record albums, and books. The brainchild of John Cleese, these benefit shows in London and their many spin-offs raised considerable sums of money for Amnesty, raised public and media awareness of the human rights cause, and influenced many other members of the entertainment community (especially rock musicians) to become involved in political and social issues. Among the many musicians who have publicly attributed their activism—and the organisation of their own benefit events—to the inspiration of the work in this field of Monty Python are Bob Geldof (organiser of Live Aid), U2, Pete Townshend, and Sting. Bono told Rolling Stone in 1986, "I saw The Secret Policeman's Ball and it became a part of me. It sowed a seed..." Sting stated, "before [the Ball] I did not know about Amnesty, I did not know about its work, I did not know about torture in the world." On the impact of the Ball on Geldof, Sting quipped, "he took the 'Ball' and ran with it."

Ball co-founder Cleese and Jones had an involvement (as performer, writer or director) in all four Amnesty benefit shows, Palin in three, Chapman in two, and Gilliam in one. Idle did not participate in the Amnesty shows. Notwithstanding Idle's lack of participation, the other five members (together with "Associate Pythons" Carol Cleveland and Neil Innes) all appeared together in the first Secret Policeman's Ball benefit—the 1976 A Poke in the Eye held at Her Majesty's Theatre in London's West End—where they performed several Python sketches. In this first show, they were collectively billed as Monty Python. Peter Cook deputised for the absent Idle in a courtroom sketch. In the next three shows, the participating Python members performed many Python sketches, but were billed under their individual names rather than under the collective Python banner. The second show featured newcomer Rowan Atkinson and Scottish comedian Billy Connolly. The Secret Policeman's Ball were the first stage shows in the UK to present comedic performers (such as Monty Python and Rowan Atkinson) in the same setting and shows as their contemporaries in rock music (which included Eric Clapton, Sting and Phil Collins). After a six-year break, Amnesty resumed producing Secret Policeman's Ball benefit shows which were held at the London Palladium in 1987 (sometimes with, and sometimes without, variants of the title) and by 2006 had presented a total of twelve shows. Since 1987, the Balls featured newer generations of British comedic performers, such as Stephen Fry, Hugh Laurie, and puppets from the satirical TV show Spitting Image, with many attributing their participation in the show to their desire to emulate the Python's pioneering work for Amnesty. Cleese and Palin made a brief cameo appearance in the 1989 Amnesty show; apart from that, the Pythons have not appeared in shows after the first four.

=== Going solo ===
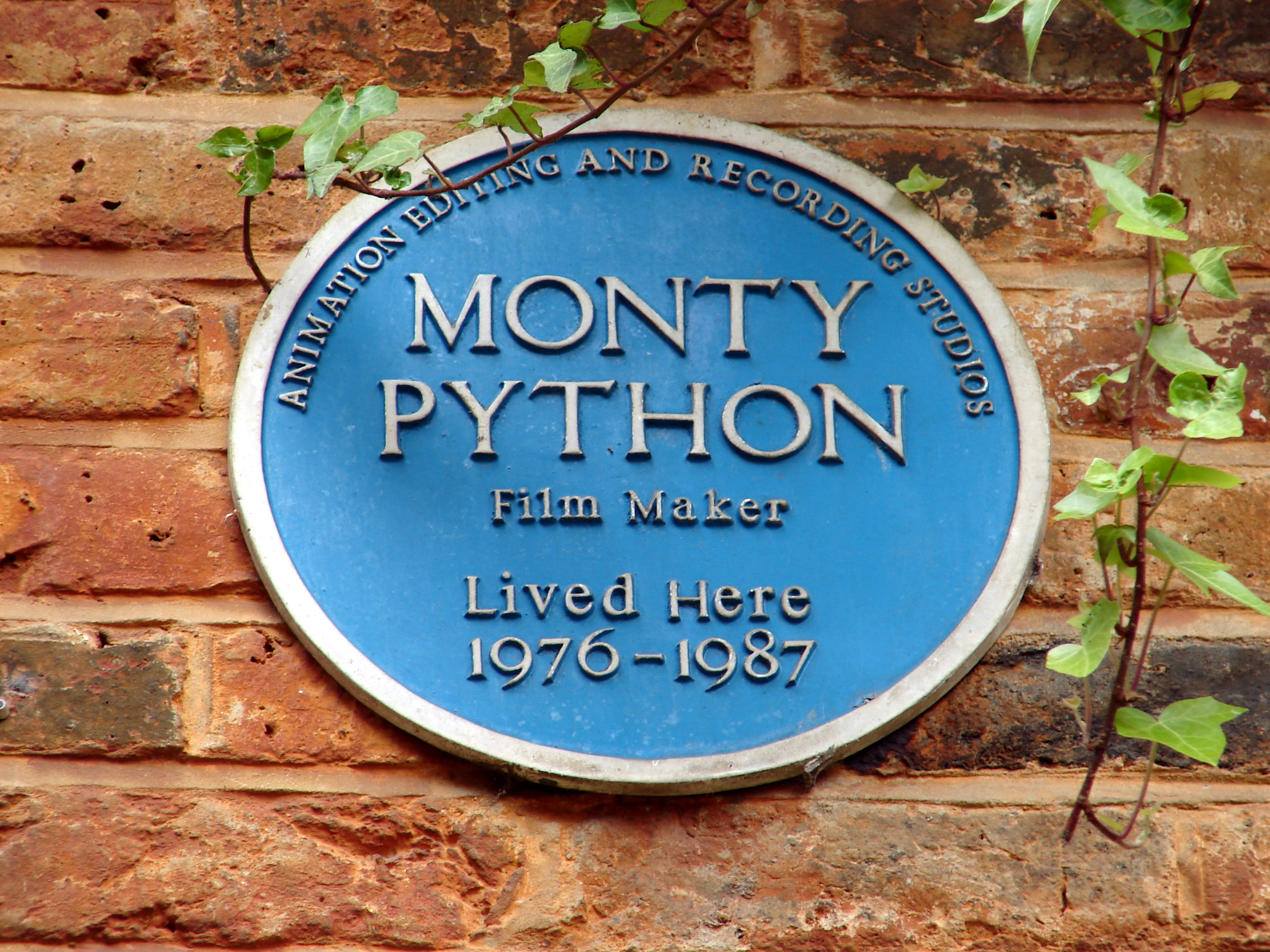
Blue plaque at 11 Neal's Yard, London, marking where Palin and Gilliam bought offices in 1976 as studios and editing suites for Python films and solo projects.

Each member has pursued various film, television, and stage projects since the break-up of the group, but often continued to work with one another. Many of these collaborations were very successful, most notably A Fish Called Wanda (1988), written by Cleese, in which he starred along with Palin. The pair also appeared in Time Bandits (1981), a film directed by Gilliam, who wrote it together with Palin. Gilliam directed Jabberwocky (1977), and also directed and co-wrote Brazil (1985), which featured Palin, The Adventures of Baron Munchausen (1988), which featured Idle; he followed these with writing and directing an additional six (as of 2021) films.

HandMade Films, the film studio that George Harrison co-founded to produce Life of Brian, contributed to British cinema in the 1980s, producing classics of the period including The Long Good Friday and Mona Lisa (both starring Bob Hoskins), Time Bandits, and Withnail and I, with the studio also launching Terry Gilliam's directorial career. Yellowbeard (1983) was co-written by Chapman and starred Chapman, Idle, and Cleese, as well as many other English comedians including Peter Cook, Spike Milligan, and Marty Feldman.

Palin and Jones wrote the comedic TV series Ripping Yarns (1976–79), starring Palin. Jones also appeared in the pilot episode and Cleese appeared in a nonspeaking part in the episode "Golden Gordon". Jones' film Erik the Viking also has Cleese playing a small part. In 1996 Terry Jones wrote and directed an adaptation of Kenneth Grahame's novel The Wind in the Willows. It featured four members of Monty Python: Jones as Mr. Toad, Idle as Ratty, Cleese as Mr. Toad's lawyer, and Palin as the Sun. Gilliam was considered for the voice of the river. The film included Steve Coogan who played Mole.

Cleese has the most prolific solo career, appearing in dozens of films, several TV shows or series (including Cheers, 3rd Rock from the Sun, Q's assistant in the James Bond movies, and Will & Grace), many direct-to-video productions, some video games and a number of commercials. His BBC sitcom Fawlty Towers (written by and starring Cleese together with his wife Connie Booth) is the only comedy series to rank higher than the Flying Circus on the BFI TV 100's list, topping the whole poll. Cleese's character, Basil Fawlty, was ranked second (to Homer Simpson) on Channel 4's 2001 list of the 100 Greatest TV Characters.

Idle enjoyed critical success with Rutland Weekend Television in the mid-1970s, out of which came the Beatles parody the Rutles (responsible for the cult mockumentary All You Need Is Cash), and as an actor in Nuns on the Run (1990) with Robbie Coltrane. In 1976 Idle directed music videos for George Harrison songs "This Song" and "Crackerbox Palace", the latter of which also featured cameo appearances from Neil Innes and John Cleese. Idle has had success with Python songs: "Always Look on the Bright Side of Life" went to no. 3 in the UK singles chart in 1991. The song had been revived by Simon Mayo on BBC Radio 1, and was consequently released as a single that year. The theatrical phenomenon of the Python musical Spamalot has made Idle the most financially successful of the troupe after Python. Written by Idle (and featuring a pre-recorded cameo of Cleese as the voice of God), it has proved to be an enormous hit on Broadway, London's West End and Las Vegas. This was followed by Not the Messiah, which revises The Life of Brian as an oratorio. For the work's 2007 premiere at the Luminato festival in Toronto (which commissioned the work), Idle himself sang the "baritone-ish" part.

=== After Python reunions ===
Since The Meaning of Life, their last project as a team, the Pythons have often been the subject of reunion rumours. In 1988 Monty Python won the BAFTA Award for Outstanding British Contribution to Cinema, with four of the six Pythons (Jones, Palin, Gilliam and Chapman) collecting the award. The final appearance of all six together occurred during the 1989 Parrot Sketch Not Included – 20 Years of Monty Python TV special. Chapman's death in October 1989 put an end to the speculation of any further reunions. However, there were several occasions after 1989 when the remaining five members gathered together for appearances — albeit not formal reunions. In 1996 Jones, Idle, Cleese, and Palin were featured in a film adaptation of The Wind in the Willows, which was later renamed Mr. Toad's Wild Ride. In 1997, Palin and Cleese rolled out a new version of the "Dead Parrot sketch" for Saturday Night Live.

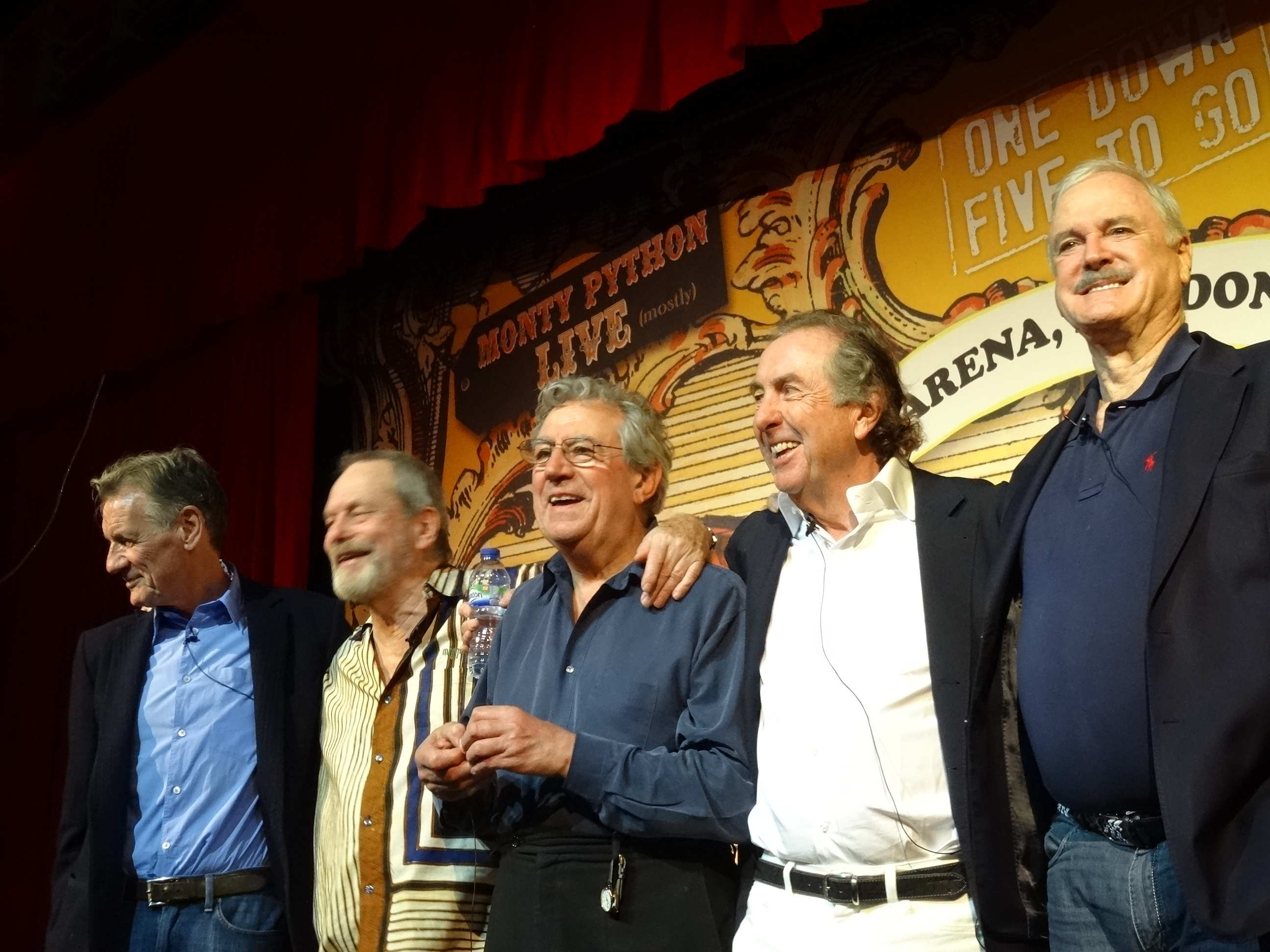
Left to right: Palin, Gilliam, Jones, Idle, Cleese (pictured in 2014).

Monty Python were the inaugural recipients of the Empire Inspiration Award in 1997. Palin, Jones and Gilliam received the award on stage in London from Elton John while Cleese and Idle appeared via satellite from Los Angeles. In 1998, during the US Comedy Arts Festival, where the troupe were awarded the AFI Star Award by the American Film Institute, the five remaining members, along with what was purported to be Chapman's ashes, were reunited on stage for the first time in 18 years. The occasion was in the form of an interview called Monty Python Live at Aspen (hosted by Robert Klein) in which the team looked back at some of their work and performed a few new sketches. On 9 October 1999, to commemorate 30 years since the first Flying Circus television broadcast, BBC2 devoted an evening to Python programmes, including a documentary charting the history of the team, interspersed with new sketches by the Monty Python team filmed especially for the event.

The surviving Pythons had agreed in principle to perform a live tour of America in 1999. Several shows were to be linked with Q&A meetings in various cities. Although all had said yes, Palin later changed his mind, much to the annoyance of Idle, who had begun work organising the tour. This led to Idle refusing to take part in the new material shot for the BBC anniversary evening. In 2002, four of the surviving members, bar Cleese, performed "The Lumberjack Song" and "Sit on My Face" for George Harrison's memorial concert. The reunion also included regular supporting contributors Neil Innes and Carol Cleveland, with a special appearance from Tom Hanks. In an interview to publicise the DVD release of The Meaning of Life, Cleese said a further reunion was unlikely. "It is absolutely impossible to get even a majority of us together in a room, and I'm not joking," Cleese said. He said that the problem was one of busyness rather than one of bad feelings. A sketch appears on the same DVD spoofing the impossibility of a full reunion, bringing the members "together" in a deliberately unconvincing fashion with modern bluescreen/greenscreen techniques.

Idle responded to queries about a Python reunion by adapting a line used by George Harrison in response to queries about a possible Beatles reunion. When asked about such a possibility in November 1989, Harrison responded: "As far as I'm concerned, there won't be a Beatles reunion as long as John Lennon remains dead." Idle's version of this was that he expected to see a proper Python reunion, "just as soon as Graham Chapman comes back from the dead", but added, "we're talking to his agent about terms."

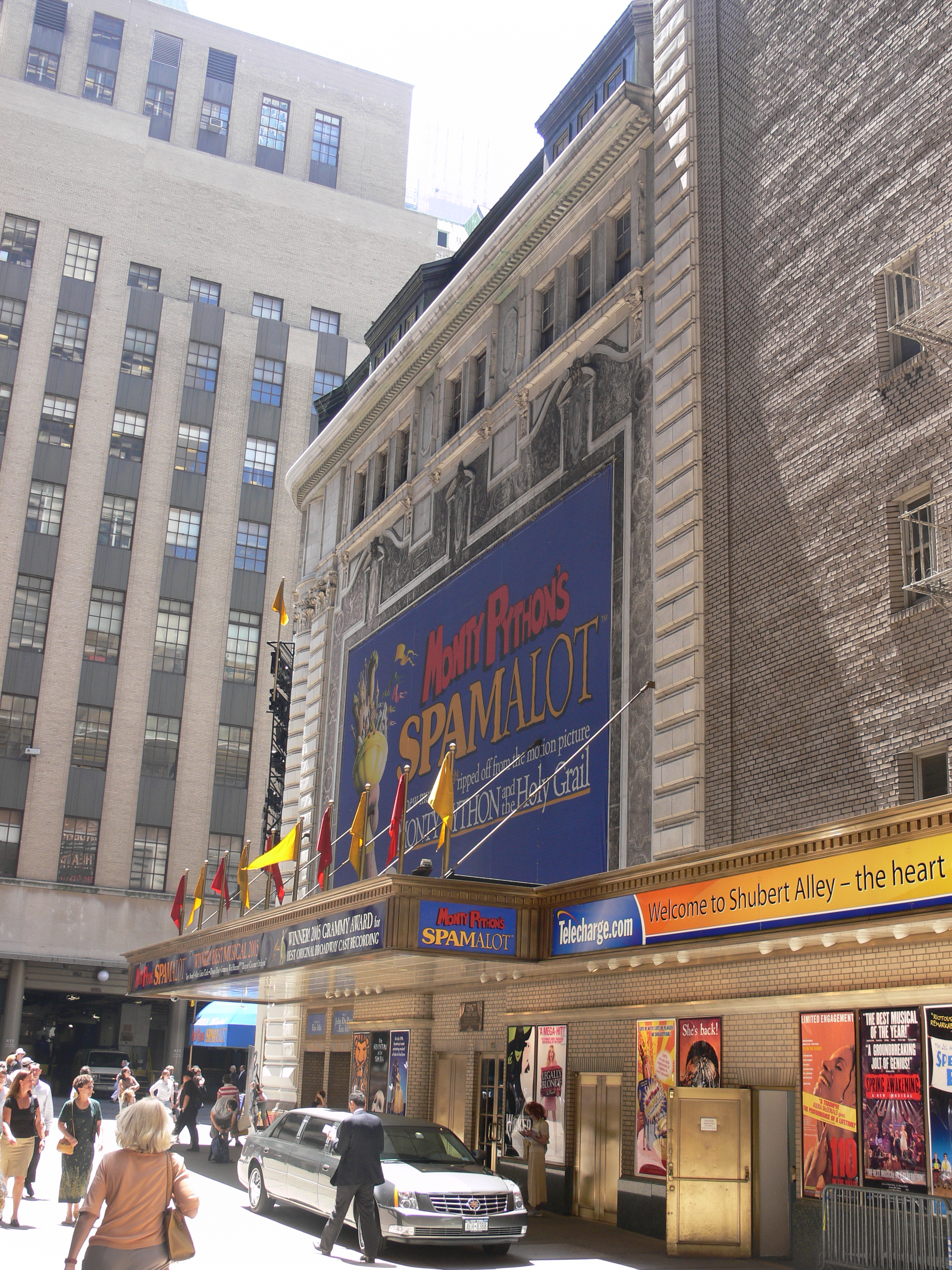
Spamalot at the Shubert Theatre, New York in 2006. Winning the 2005 Tony Award for Best Musical, Idle's musical opened in London's West End a year later. The original Broadway cast included Tim Curry as King Arthur, Hank Azaria as Sir Lancelot, and Cleese as the (recorded) voice of God.

The Pythons Autobiography by The Pythons (2003), compiled from interviews with the surviving members, reveals that a series of disputes in 1998, over a possible sequel to Holy Grail that had been conceived by Idle, may have resulted in the group's split. Cleese's feeling was that The Meaning of Life had been personally difficult and ultimately mediocre, and did not wish to be involved in another Python project for a variety of reasons (not least amongst them was the absence of Chapman, whose straight man-like central roles in the Grail and Brian films had been considered to be an essential anchoring performance). The book also reveals that Cleese saw Chapman as his "greatest sounding board. If Graham thought something was funny, then it almost certainly was funny. You cannot believe how invaluable that is.' Ultimately it was Cleese who ended the possibility of another Python movie.

A full, if nonperforming, reunion of the surviving Python members appeared at the March 2005 premiere of Idle's musical Spamalot. Based on Monty Python and the Holy Grail, it also spoofs popular musicals, including those of Andrew Lloyd Webber. It opened in Chicago and has since played in New York on Broadway, London, and numerous other major cities across the world. In 2004, Spamalot was nominated for 14 Tony Awards and won three: Best Musical, Best Direction of a Musical for Mike Nichols, and Best Performance by a Featured Actress in a Musical for Sara Ramirez, who played the Lady of the Lake, a character specially added for the musical. The original Broadway cast included Tim Curry as King Arthur, Michael McGrath as Patsy, David Hyde Pierce as Sir Robin, Hank Azaria as Sir Lancelot and other roles (e.g., the French Taunter, Knight of Ni, and Tim the Enchanter), Christopher Sieber as Sir Galahad and other roles (e.g., the Black Knight and Prince Herbert's Father). Cleese played the voice of God, a role played in the film by Chapman.

Owing in part to the success of Spamalot, PBS announced on 13 July 2005 that it would begin to re-air the entire run of Monty Python's Flying Circus and new one-hour specials focusing on each member of the group, called Monty Python's Personal Best. Each episode was written and produced by the individual being honoured, with the five remaining Pythons collaborating on Chapman's programme, the only one of the editions to take on a serious tone with its new material.

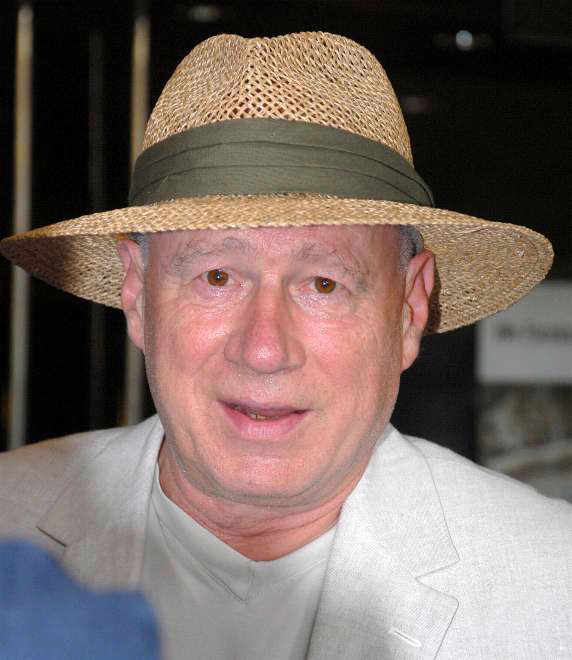
Long-time collaborator Neil Innes at the premiere of The Seventh Python in 2009

In 2009, to commemorate the 40th anniversary of the first episode of Monty Python's Flying Circus, a six-part documentary entitled Monty Python: Almost the Truth (Lawyers Cut) was released, featuring interviews with the surviving members of the team, as well as archive interviews with Graham Chapman and numerous excerpts from the television series and films. Each episode opens with a different re-recording of the theme song from Life of Brian, with Iron Maiden vocalist and Python fan Bruce Dickinson performing the sixth.

Also in commemoration of the 40th anniversary, Idle, Palin, Jones, and Gilliam appeared in a production of Not the Messiah at the Royal Albert Hall. The European premiere was held on 23 October 2009. An official 40th anniversary Monty Python reunion event took place in New York City on 15 October 2009, where the team received a Special Award from the British Academy of Film and Television Arts.

In June 2011, it was announced that A Liar's Autobiography: The Untrue Story of Monty Python's Graham Chapman, an animated 3D movie based on the memoir of Graham Chapman, was in the making. The memoir A Liar's Autobiography was published in 1980 and details Chapman's journey through medical school, alcoholism, acknowledgement of his gay identity, and the tolls of surreal comedy. Asked what was true in a deliberately fanciful account by Chapman of his life, Terry Jones joked: "Nothing ... it's all a downright, absolute, blackguardly lie." The film uses Chapman's own voice—from a reading of his autobiography shortly before he died of cancer—and entertainment channel Epix announced the film's release in early 2012 in both 2D and 3D formats. Produced and directed by London-based Bill Jones, Ben Timlett, and Jeff Simpson, the new film has 15 animation companies working on chapters that will range from three to 12 minutes in length, each in a different style. John Cleese recorded dialogue which was matched with Chapman's voice. Michael Palin voiced Chapman's father and Terry Jones voiced his mother. Terry Gilliam voiced Graham's psychiatrist. They all play various other roles. Among the original Python group, only Eric Idle was not involved.

On 26 January 2012, Terry Jones announced that the five surviving Pythons would reunite in a sci-fi comedy film called Absolutely Anything. The film would combine computer-generated imagery and live action. It would be directed by Jones based on a script by Jones and Gavin Scott, and in addition to the Python members it would also star Simon Pegg, Kate Beckinsale and Robin Williams (in his final film role). The plot revolves around a teacher who discovers aliens (voiced by the Pythons) have given him magical powers to do "absolutely anything". Eric Idle responded via Twitter that he would not, in fact, be participating, although he was later added to the cast.

=== Monty Python Live (Mostly): One Down, Five to Go ===
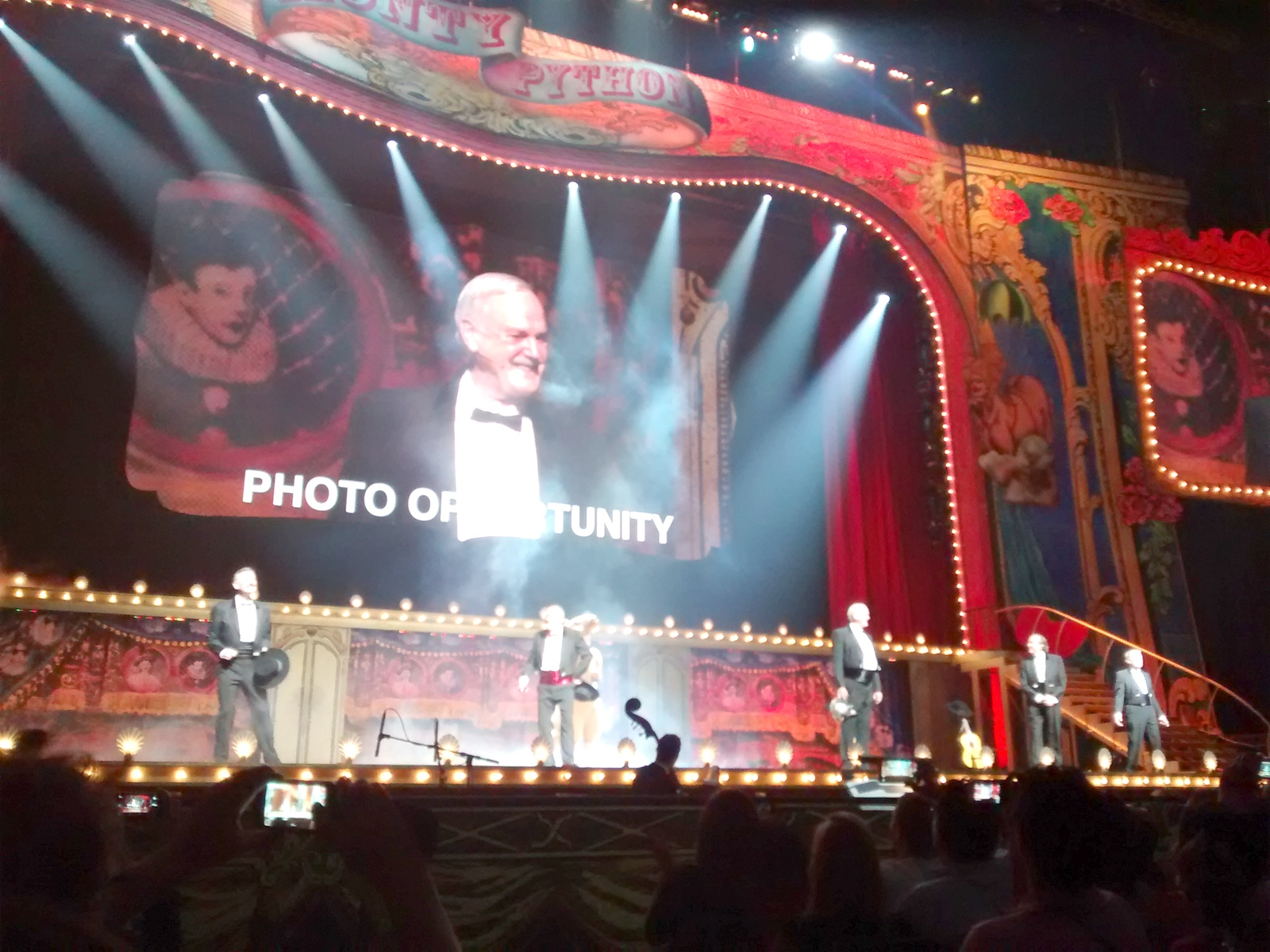
Members of Monty Python on stage at the O_{2} Arena, London, in July 2014

In 2013, the Pythons lost a legal case to Mark Forstater, the film producer of Monty Python and the Holy Grail, over royalties for the derivative work Spamalot. They owed a combined £800,000 in legal fees and back royalties to Forstater. They proposed a reunion show to pay their legal bill.

On 19 November 2013, a new reunion was reported, following months of "secret talks". The original plan was for a live, one-off stage show at the O_{2} Arena in London on 1 July 2014, with "some of Monty Python's greatest hits, with modern, topical, Pythonesque twists" according to a press release. The tickets for this show went on sale in November 2013 and sold out in just 43 seconds. Nine additional shows were added, all of them at the O_{2}, the last on 20 July. They have said that their reunion was inspired by South Park creators Trey Parker and Matt Stone, who are massive Monty Python fans.

Mick Jagger and Charlie Watts featured in a promotional video for the shows: "Who wants to see that again, really? It's a bunch of wrinkly old men trying to relive their youth and make a load of money—the best one died years ago!" Michael Palin stated that the final reunion show on 20 July 2014 would be the last time that the troupe would perform together. It was screened to 2,000 cinemas around the world. Prior to the final night, Idle stated, "It is a world event and that's really quite exciting. It means we're actually going to say goodbye publicly on one show. Nobody ever has the chance to do that. The Beatles didn't get a last good night." The last show was broadcast in the UK on Gold TV and internationally in cinemas by Fathom Events through a Dish Network satellite link.

In April 2015, the five surviving Pythons participated in a reunion event moderated by John Oliver as part of the Tribeca Festival at the Beacon Theatre in New York City following a 40th anniversary screening of Monty Python and the Holy Grail.

== Broadcast rights ==
Netflix secured the global streaming rights for the Monty Python catalogue in 2018. Shout Factory picked up American and Canadian distribution rights from Netflix in 2024.

== Python members ==
=== Graham Chapman ===
Graham Chapman was originally a medical student, joining the Footlights at Cambridge. He completed his medical training and was legally entitled to practise as a doctor. Chapman is best remembered for the lead roles in Holy Grail, as King Arthur, and Life of Brian, as Brian Cohen. He died of metastatic throat cancer on 4 October 1989. At Chapman's memorial service, Cleese delivered an irreverent eulogy that included all the euphemisms for being dead from the "Dead Parrot" sketch, which they had written. Chapman's comedic fictional memoir, A Liar's Autobiography: Volume VI, was adapted into an animated 3D film in 2012.

=== John Cleese ===
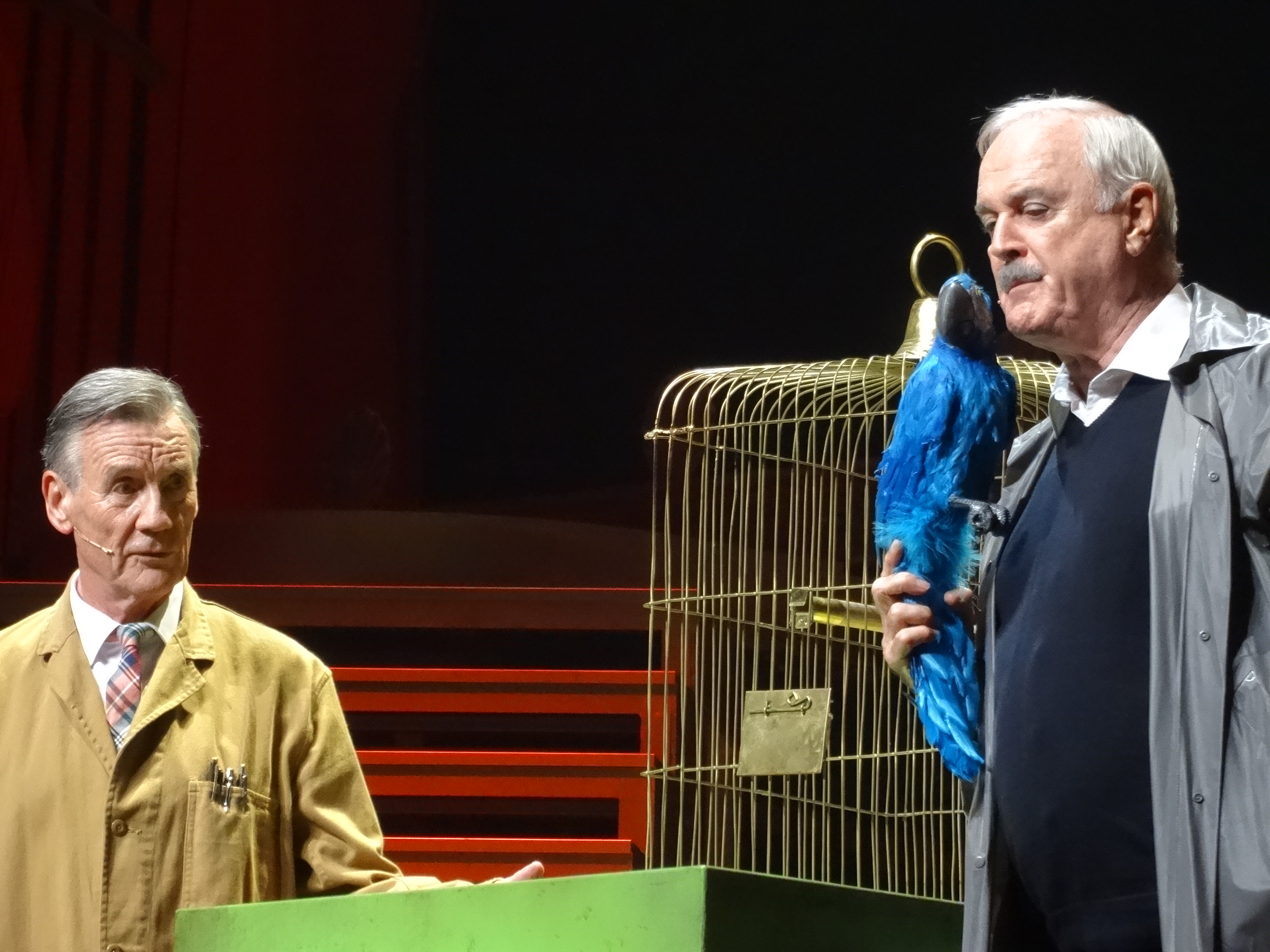
John Cleese (right) and Michael Palin performing the "Dead Parrot sketch" in 2014

John Cleese is the oldest Python. He met his future Python writing partner, Chapman, in Cambridge. Outside of Python, he is best known for setting up the Video Arts group and for the sitcom Fawlty Towers (co-written with Connie Booth, whom Cleese met during work on Python and to whom he was married for a decade). In Fawlty Towers Cleese starred as hotel owner Basil Fawlty, and received the 1980 British Academy Television Award for Best Entertainment Performance. Cleese has also co-authored several books on psychology and wrote the screenplay for the award-winning A Fish Called Wanda, in which he starred with Michael Palin, and was nominated for the Academy Award for Best Original Screenplay.

=== Terry Gilliam ===
Terry Gilliam, an American by birth, is the only member of the troupe of non-British origin. He started off as an animator and strip cartoonist for Harvey Kurtzman's Help! magazine, one issue of which featured Cleese. Moving from the US to England, he animated features for Do Not Adjust Your Set and was then asked by its makers to join them on their next project: Monty Python's Flying Circus. He co-directed Monty Python and the Holy Grail and directed short segments of other Python films (for instance "The Crimson Permanent Assurance", the short film that appears before The Meaning of Life). Gilliam has directed thirteen films in total, and collaborated with Palin on three of them, which included Palin starring in Brazil (1985).

=== Eric Idle ===
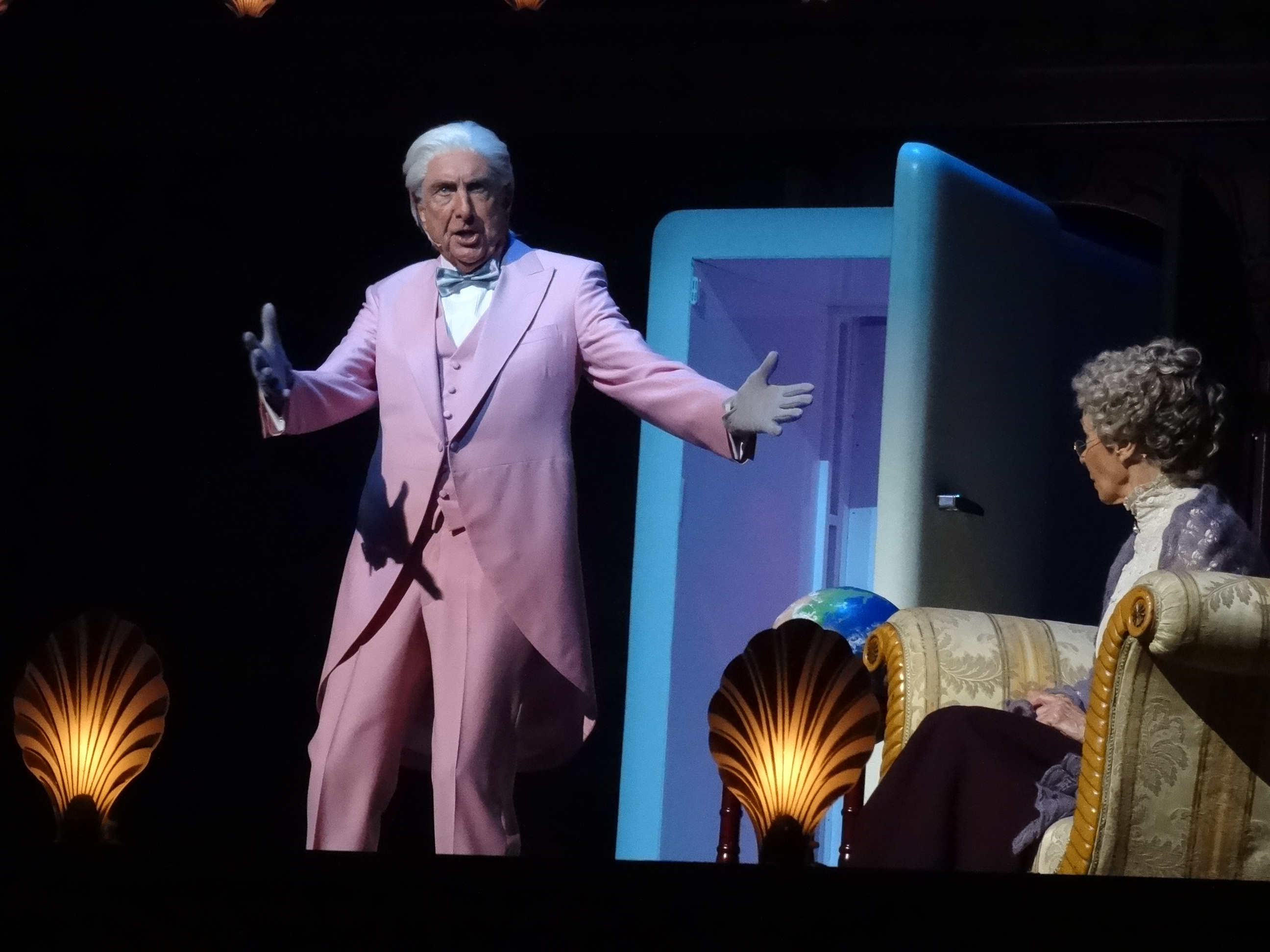
Eric Idle singing the "Galaxy Song" (from The Meaning of Life) at the 2014 Monty Python reunion. Known for his wordplay and musical numbers, he also performed "Always Look on the Bright Side of Life" (from Life of Brian)

When Monty Python was first formed, two writing partnerships existed, Cleese and Chapman, Jones and Palin. That left Gilliam, operating solo due to the nature of his work, and Eric Idle. Regular themes in Idle's contributions were elaborate wordplay and musical numbers. After Flying Circus, Idle’s first solo project was the TV series Rutland Weekend Television, which lasted for two series in 1975 and 1976. He then hosted Saturday Night Live four times in the first five seasons. Idle's initially successful solo career faltered in the 1990s with the failures of his 1993 film Splitting Heirs (written, produced by, and starring him) and 1998's An Alan Smithee Film: Burn Hollywood Burn (in which he starred). He revived his career by returning to the source of his worldwide fame, adapting Monty Python material for other media. Idle wrote the Tony Award-winning musical Spamalot, based on Holy Grail. Following the success of the musical he wrote Not the Messiah, an oratorio derived from the Life of Brian. Representing Monty Python, Idle featured in a one-hour symphony of British Music when he performed "Always Look on the Bright Side of Life" at the London 2012 Olympic Games closing ceremony.

=== Terry Jones ===
Terry Jones has been described by other members of the team as the "heart" of the group. Jones had a lead role in maintaining the group's unity and creative independence. Python biographer George Perry has commented that should "[you] speak to him on subjects as diverse as fossil fuels, or Rupert Bear, or mercenaries in the Middle Ages or Modern China ... in a moment you will find yourself hopelessly out of your depth, floored by his knowledge." Many others agree that Jones is characterised by his irrepressible, good-natured enthusiasm. Jones' passion often led to prolonged arguments with other group members—in particular Cleese—with Jones often unwilling to back down. Since his major contributions were largely behind the scenes (direction, writing), and he often deferred to the other members of the group as an actor, Jones' importance to Python was often underrated. He does have the legacy of delivering possibly the most famous line in all of Python, as Brian's mother Mandy in Life of Brian, "He's not the Messiah, he's a very naughty boy!", a line voted the funniest in film history on two occasions. Jones died on 21 January 2020 from complications of dementia.

=== Michael Palin ===
Sir Michael Palin attended Oxford, where he met his Python writing partner Jones. The two also wrote the series Ripping Yarns together. Palin and Jones originally wrote face-to-face, but soon found it was more productive to write apart and then come together to review what the other had written. Therefore, Jones and Palin's sketches tended to be more focused than that of the others, taking one bizarre situation, sticking to it, and building on it. After Flying Circus, Palin hosted Saturday Night Live four times in the first 10 seasons. His comedy output began to decrease in amount following the increasing success of his travel documentaries for the BBC. Palin released a book of diaries from the Python years entitled Michael Palin Diaries 1969–1979, published in 2007. Palin was awarded a knighthood in the 2019 New Year Honours, which was announced by Buckingham Palace in December 2018.

=== Associate Pythons ===
Several people have been accorded unofficial "associate Python" status over the years. Occasionally, such people have been referred to as the 'seventh Python', in a style reminiscent of George Martin (or other associates of the Beatles) being dubbed "the Fifth Beatle". Two collaborators with notably meaningful contributions have been Neil Innes and Carol Cleveland. Both were present and presented as Associate Pythons at the official Monty Python 25th-anniversary celebrations held in Los Angeles in July 1994.

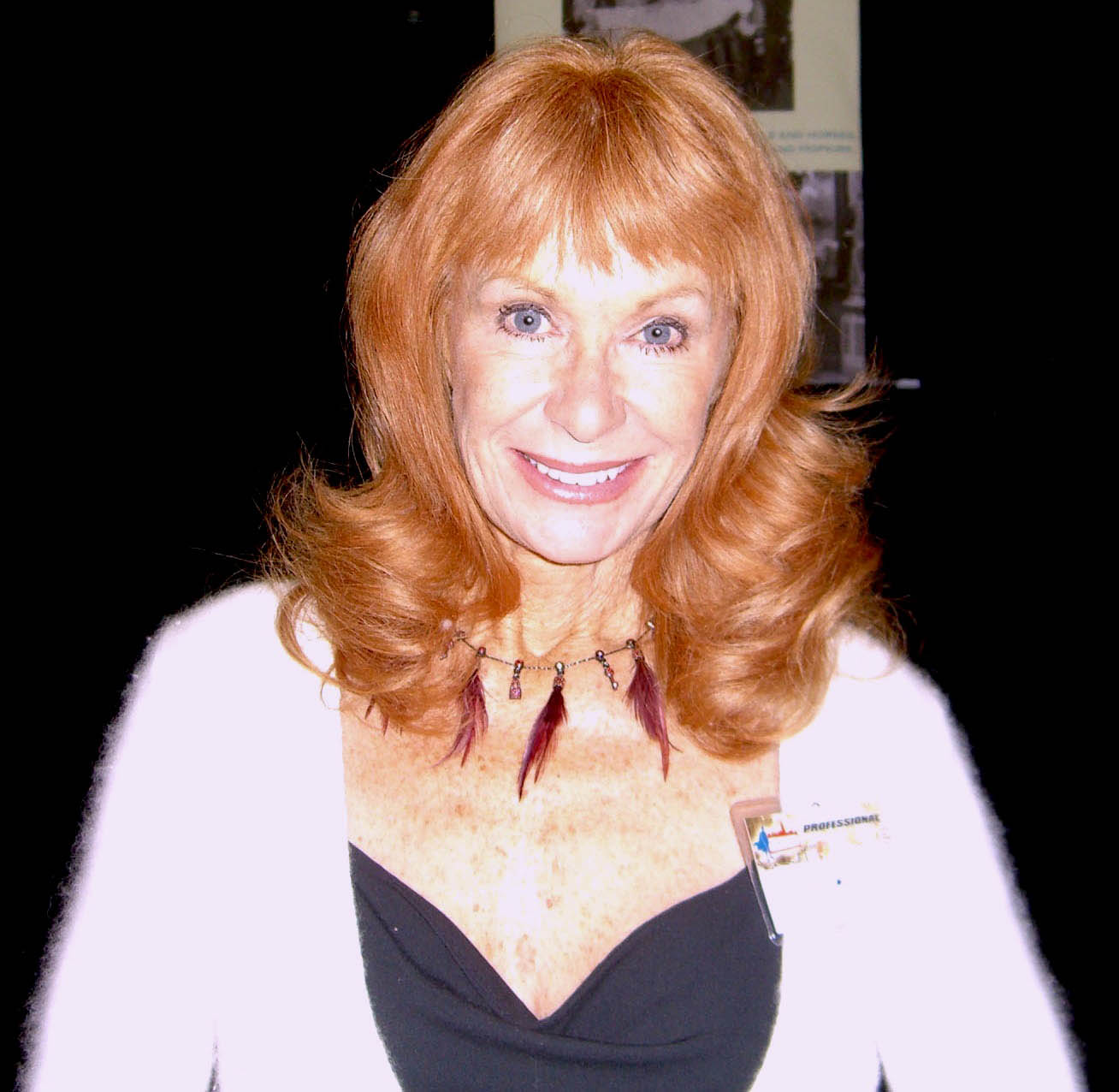
Carol Cleveland (in 2009), commonly called "Python girl", or "Seventh Python".

Neil Innes is the only non-Python besides Douglas Adams to be credited with writing material for Flying Circus. He appeared in sketches and the Python films, as well as performing some of his songs in Monty Python Live at the Hollywood Bowl. He was also a regular stand-in for absent team members on the rare occasions when they recreated sketches. For example, he took the place of Cleese at the Concert for George. Gilliam once noted that if anyone qualified for the title of the seventh Python, it would be Innes. He was one of the creative talents in the off-beat Bonzo Dog Band. He would later portray Ron Nasty of the Rutles and write all of the Rutles' compositions for All You Need Is Cash (1978), a mockumentary film co-directed by Idle. By 2005, a falling out had occurred between Idle and Innes over additional Rutles projects, the results being Innes' critically acclaimed Rutles "reunion" album The Rutles: Archaeology and Idle's straight-to-DVD The Rutles 2: Can't Buy Me Lunch, each undertaken without the other's participation. According to an interview with Idle in the Chicago Tribune in May 2005, his attitude is that Innes and he go back "too far. And no further." Innes died of a heart attack on 29 December 2019 near Toulouse, where he had lived for several years.

Carol Cleveland was the most important female performer in the Monty Python ensemble, commonly referred to as "the female Python". She was originally hired by producer/director John Howard Davies for just the first five episodes of the Flying Circus. The Pythons then pushed to make Cleveland a permanent recurring performer after producer/director Ian MacNaughton brought in several other actresses who were not as good as she was. Cleveland went on to appear in about two-thirds of the episodes, as well as in all of the Python films, and in most of their stage shows, as well. According to Time, her most recognisable film roles are playing Zoot and Dingo, two maidens in the Castle Anthrax in Holy Grail.

=== Other contributors ===
Cleese's first wife, Connie Booth, appeared as various characters in all four series of Flying Circus. Her most significant role was the "best girl" of the eponymous Lumberjack in "The Lumberjack Song", though this role was sometimes played by Carol Cleveland. Booth appeared in a total of six sketches and also played one-off characters in Python feature films And Now for Something Completely Different and Monty Python and the Holy Grail.

Douglas Adams was "discovered" by Chapman when a version of Footlights Revue (a 1974 BBC2 television show featuring some of Adams' early work) was performed live in London's West End. In Cleese's absence from the final TV series, the two formed a brief writing partnership, with Adams earning a writing credit in one episode for a sketch called "Patient Abuse". In the sketch—a satire on mind-boggling bureaucracy—a man who had been stabbed by a nurse arrives at his doctor's office bleeding profusely from the stomach, when the doctor makes him fill in numerous senseless forms before he can administer treatment. He also had two cameo appearances in this season. Firstly, in the episode "The Light Entertainment War", Adams shows up in a surgeon's mask (as Dr. Emile Koning, according to the on-screen captions), pulling on gloves, while Palin narrates a sketch that introduces one person after another, and never actually gets started. Secondly, at the beginning of "Mr. Neutron", Adams is dressed in a "pepperpot" outfit and loads a missile onto a cart being driven by Terry Jones, who is calling out for scrap metal ("Any old iron ..."). Adams and Chapman also subsequently attempted a few non-Python projects, including Out of the Trees. He also contributed to a sketch on the soundtrack album for Monty Python and the Holy Grail.

Other than Carol Cleveland, the only other non-Python to make a significant number of appearances in the Flying Circus was Ian Davidson. He appeared in the first two series of the show, and played over 10 roles. While Davidson is primarily known as a scriptwriter, it is not known if he had any contribution toward the writing of the sketches, as he is only credited as a performer. In total, Davidson is credited as appearing in eight episodes of the show, which is more than any other male actor who was not a Python. Despite this, Davidson did not appear in any Python-related media subsequent to series 2, though footage of him was shown on the documentary Python Night – 30 Years of Monty Python.

Stand-up comedian Eddie Izzard, a devoted fan of the group, has occasionally stood in for absent members. When the BBC held a "Python Night" in 1999 to celebrate 30 years of the first broadcast of Flying Circus, the Pythons recorded some new material with Izzard standing in for Idle, who had declined to partake in person (he taped a solo contribution from the US). Izzard hosted The Life of Python (1999), a history of the group that was part of Python Night and appeared with them at a festival/tribute in Aspen, Colorado, in 1998 (released on DVD as Live at Aspen). Izzard has said that Monty Python was a significant influence on her style of comedy and Cleese has referred to her as "the lost Python".

Series director of Flying Circus, Ian MacNaughton, is also regularly associated with the group and made a few on-screen appearances in the show and in the film And Now for Something Completely Different. Apart from Neil Innes, others to contribute musically included Fred Tomlinson and the Fred Tomlinson Singers. They made appearances in songs such as "The Lumberjack Song" as a backup choir. Other contributors and performers for the Pythons included John Howard Davies, John Hughman, Lyn Ashley, Bob Raymond, John Young, Rita Davies, Stanley Mason, Maureen Flanagan, and David Ballantyne.

== Cultural influence and legacy ==
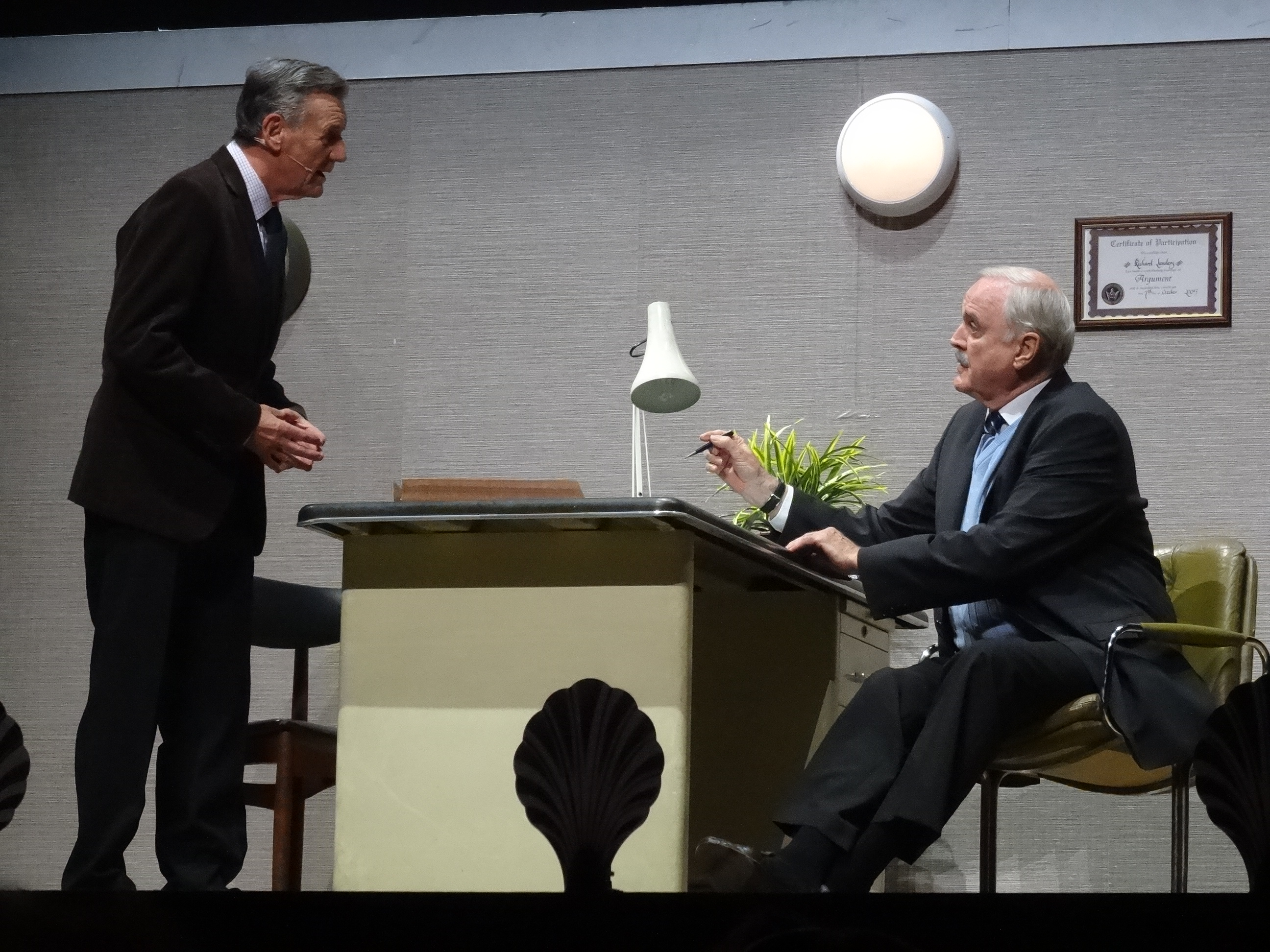
"Argument Clinic" sketch with Palin (standing) and Cleese in 2014. CNN states, "Monty Python has been called The Beatles of comedy".

By the time of Monty Python's 25th anniversary, in 1994, the point was already being made that "the five surviving members had with the passing years begun to occupy an institutional position in the edifice of British social culture that they had once had so much fun trying to demolish". A similar point is made in a 2006 book on the relationship between Python and philosophy: "It is remarkable, after all, not only that the utterly bizarre Monty Python's Flying Circus was sponsored by the BBC in the first place, but that Monty Python itself grew into an institution of enormous cultural influence."

Ron Devillier, the PBS programming director who put Monty Python's Flying Circus on American television, states, "they brought through a kind of phony baloney surface ethic that we all lived under and shot right through it and split it in half. If you really let it happen, you could laugh at yourself. All the things that they were doing were really funny like playing on our sensibilities and making fun of them in a very funny way, pointing out how pompous we can be and making fun of themselves at the same time." Danny Gallagher of the Dallas Observer writes, "Monty Python has also been good to American comedy. If America's television viewing public had never seen "The Lumberjack Song" or "The Dead Parrot" sketch, we might still be holding up The Sonny & Cher Comedy Hour as a supreme example of cutting-edge TV comedy." The Benny Hill Show, featuring the slapstick and innuendo of Benny Hill, which contrasted with Python's more absurdist style, was also a hugely successful British comedy on US television, with Charles Isherwood writing in The New York Times: "Benny" and "Monty" were essential poles of British television comedy as imported to America in the 1970s."

A self-contained comedy unit responsible for both writing and performing their work, Monty Python's influence on comedy has been compared to the Beatles' influence on music. Author Neil Gaiman writes, "A strange combination of individuals gave us Python. And you needed those people, just in the same way that with the Beatles you had four talented people, but together you had the Beatles. And I think that's so incredibly true when it comes to Python."

=== Comedy stylists ===
"Everything I've ever done can be distilled to at least one Python sketch. If comedy had a periodic element table, Python would have more than one atom on it."

— Mike Myers.

Monty Python have been named as being influential to the comedy stylings of a great many people including: Sacha Baron Cohen, David Cross, Rowan Atkinson, Seth MacFarlane, Seth Meyers, Trey Parker, Matt Stone, Vic and Bob, Mike Myers, Russell Brand, Robin Williams, Jerry Seinfeld, Eddie Izzard, and "Weird Al" Yankovic. Matt Groening, creator of The Simpsons, was influenced by Python's "high velocity sense of the absurd and not stopping to explain yourself", and pays tribute through a couch gag used in seasons five and six. Appearing on Monty Python's Best Bits (Mostly), Jim Carrey—who refers to Monty Python as the "Super Justice League of comedy"—recalled the effect on him of Ernest Scribbler (played by Palin) laughing himself to death in "The Funniest Joke in the World" sketch. Nick Park, creator of Wallace & Gromit, was inspired by Gilliam's animation in Monty Python "to be a bit wacky and off the wall". Simon Pegg, co-writer of the Three Flavours Cornetto trilogy of British comedy films (from Shaun of the Dead to The World's End), stated his "love of comedy was hugely informed by Monty Python". Jerry Seinfeld told Parade, "Monty Python was a gigantic influence on me. They were just about silly, funny things that meant nothing, and that's the stuff I love. There's a wonderful childlike freedom in those kinds of things." Monty Python's Flying Circus served as an inspiration for voice actor Rob Paulsen in voicing Pinky from the animated television series Animaniacs and Pinky and the Brain, giving the character "a goofy whack job" of a British accent. Graham Linehan, co-creator of the sitcom Father Ted, cited the ineffectual protest of Life of Brian upon its release as an influence for the Father Ted episode "The Passion of Saint Tibulus".

Comedian John Oliver states, "Writing about the importance of Monty Python is basically pointless. Citing them as an influence is almost redundant. It's assumed. This strange group of wildly talented, appropriately disrespectful, hugely imaginative and massively inspirational idiots changed what comedy could be for their generation and for those that followed." On how Python's freeform style influenced sketch comedy, Tina Fey of the American television show Saturday Night Live states, "Sketch endings are overrated. Their key was to do something as long as it was funny and then just stop and do something else." Stephen Merchant, co-creator of The Office with Ricky Gervais, stated, "I don't remember where I got this grand idea that I could somehow be John Cleese. That was my overriding passion from my mid-teens. Cleese had grown up in Weston-Super-Mare, not far from Bristol where I grew up, and he was tall and he was very funny and very British and it's almost like I thought 'well if they want tall people from the west country I can do that.'"

=== Places ===
In space

- Seven asteroids are named after Monty Python or its members: 9617 Grahamchapman, 9618 Johncleese, 9619 Terrygilliam, 9620 Ericidle, 9621 Michaelpalin, 9622 Terryjones, and 13681 Monty Python.
- In 2010, the commercial space company SpaceX launched a wheel of cheese into low Earth orbit and returned it safely to Earth on COTS Demo Flight 1. Elon Musk, CEO and CTO of SpaceX, said this was done as a tribute to Monty Python.

Terrestrial

- After John Cleese spoke negatively about the town of Palmerston North in New Zealand, recommending it as a good place to commit suicide, the town renamed a compost heap "Mt. Cleese".

=== "Pythonesque" ===
Among the more visible cultural influences of Monty Python is the inclusion of terms either directly from, or derived from, Monty Python, into the lexicon of the English language.

- The most obvious of these is the term "Pythonesque", which has become a byword in surreal humour, and is included in standard dictionaries. Terry Jones commented on his disappointment at the existence of such a term, claiming the initial aim of Monty Python was to create something new and impossible to categorise, and "the fact that Pythonesque is now a word in the Oxford English Dictionary shows the extent to which we failed".
- The term has been applied to animations similar to those constructed by Gilliam (e.g., the cut-out style of South Park, whose creators have often acknowledged a debt to Python, including contributing material to the aforementioned 30th-anniversary theme night).
- Good Eats creator Alton Brown cited Python as one of the influences that shaped how he created the series, as well as how he authors the script for each episode. Later episodes included Gilliam-style animations to illustrate key points.
- Film critic Robbie Collin writes, "You can find the Pythonesque everywhere in cinema. Most successful Hollywood comedies bear some kind of Python-print. The Austin Powers series chugs along on Pythonisms. Then there are Christopher Guest's mockumentaries, such as Waiting for Guffman and Best in Show, which revel in the quiet absurdity of the everyday—well-staked-out Python territory. And there's a tensile weirdness in the films of Will Ferrell that's also deeply Pythonesque."

=== TV ===
The Japanese anime series Girls und Panzer featured the special episode "Survival War!", which referenced the "Spam" sketch, but the word "spam" was censored to avoid legal issue with the Pythons.

=== Things named after Monty Python ===
Beyond a dictionary definition, Python terms have entered the lexicon in other ways.

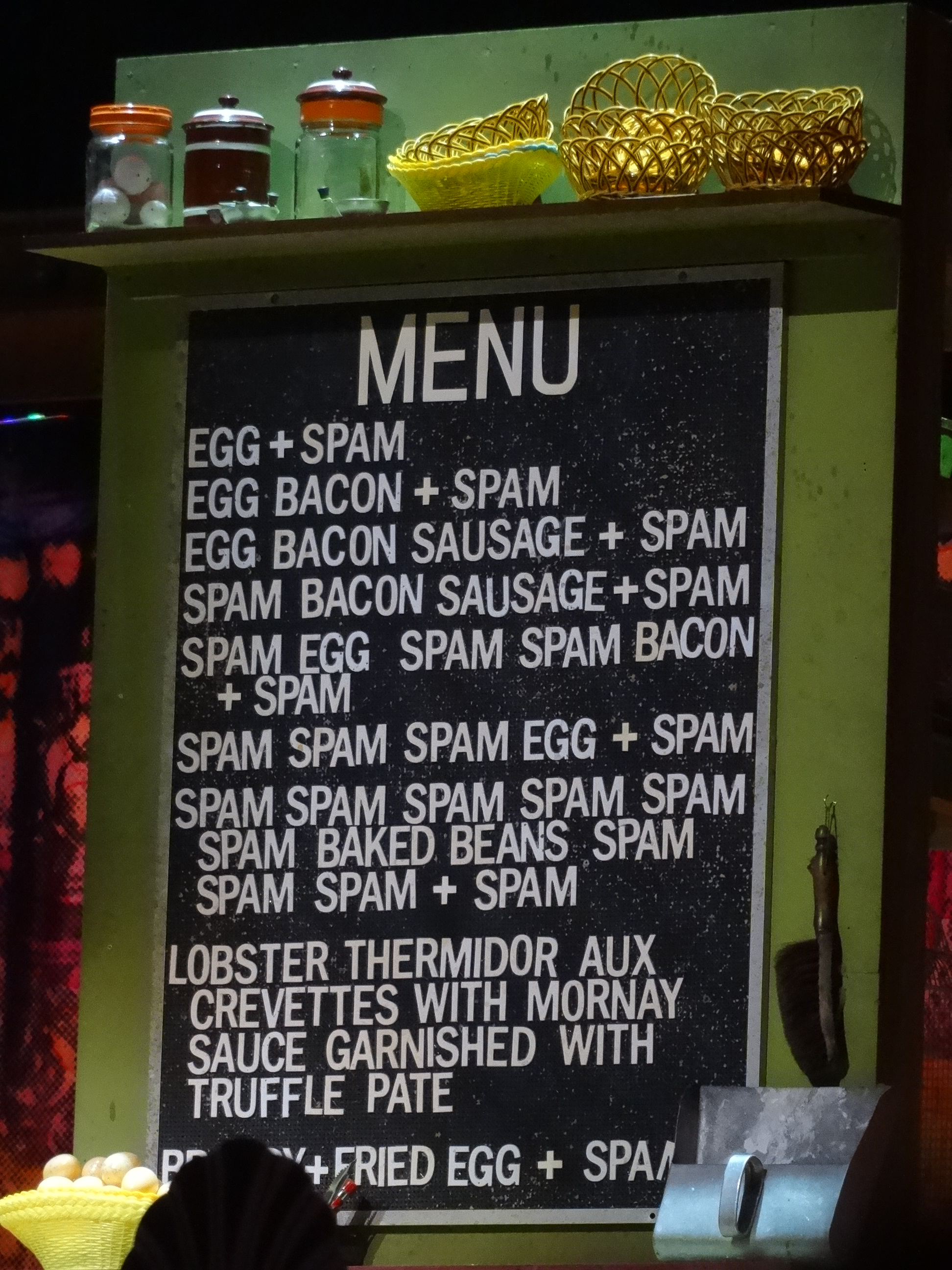
Menu from the "Spam" sketch, from where the junk term is derived. Spam is included in almost every dish, much to the consternation of a customer.

- The term "spam" in reference to bulk, unsolicited email is derived from the show's 1970 "Spam" sketch. As the waitress recites the Spam-filled menu, a chorus of Viking patrons drown out all conversations with a song, repeating "Spam, Spam, Spam, Spam… Spammity Spam! Wonderful Spam!"
- The Python programming language by Guido van Rossum is named after the troupe, and Monty Python references are often found in sample code created for that language. The default integrated development environment of the programming language is named IDLE, an alternative one is named eric, both in honour of Eric Idle. Additionally, a 2001 April Fool's Day joke by van Rossum and Larry Wall involving the merger of Python with Perl was dubbed "Parrot" after the Dead Parrot sketch. The name "Parrot" was later used for a project to develop a virtual machine for running bytecode for interpreted languages such as Perl and Python. Its package index is also known as the "Cheese Shop" after the sketch of the same name. There is also a python refactoring tool called bicyclerepair named after the Bicycle Repair Man sketch.
- In 1985, a fossil of a previously unknown species of gigantic prehistoric snake from the Miocene was discovered in Riversleigh, Queensland, Australia. The Australian palaeontologist who discovered the fossil snake was a Monty Python fan, and he gave the snake the taxonomic name of Montypythonoides riversleighensis in honour of the Monty Python team.
- In 2006, Ben & Jerry's, known for their "celebrity flavours", introduced to the line-up "Vermonty Python", a coffee liqueur ice cream with a chocolate cookie crumb swirl and fudge cows. The name "Minty Python" had been suggested before in 1996 in a contest to select the quintessential British ice cream flavour.
- In 1999, in connection with the group's 30th anniversary, a beer named "Holy Grail Ale" was released by the Black Sheep Brewery in North Yorkshire.
- The endangered Bemaraha woolly lemur (Avahi cleesei) is named after John Cleese.
- Geneticists discovered a mutant gene which caused mutant flies to live twice as long as normal ones. They dubbed the gene "Indy," which is an acronym for the line of dialogue: "I'm not dead yet!", from Monty Python and the Holy Grail.
- The band Toad the Wet Sprocket took its name from the Rock Notes sketch on the comedy album, Monty Python's Contractual Obligation Album.

=== World records ===
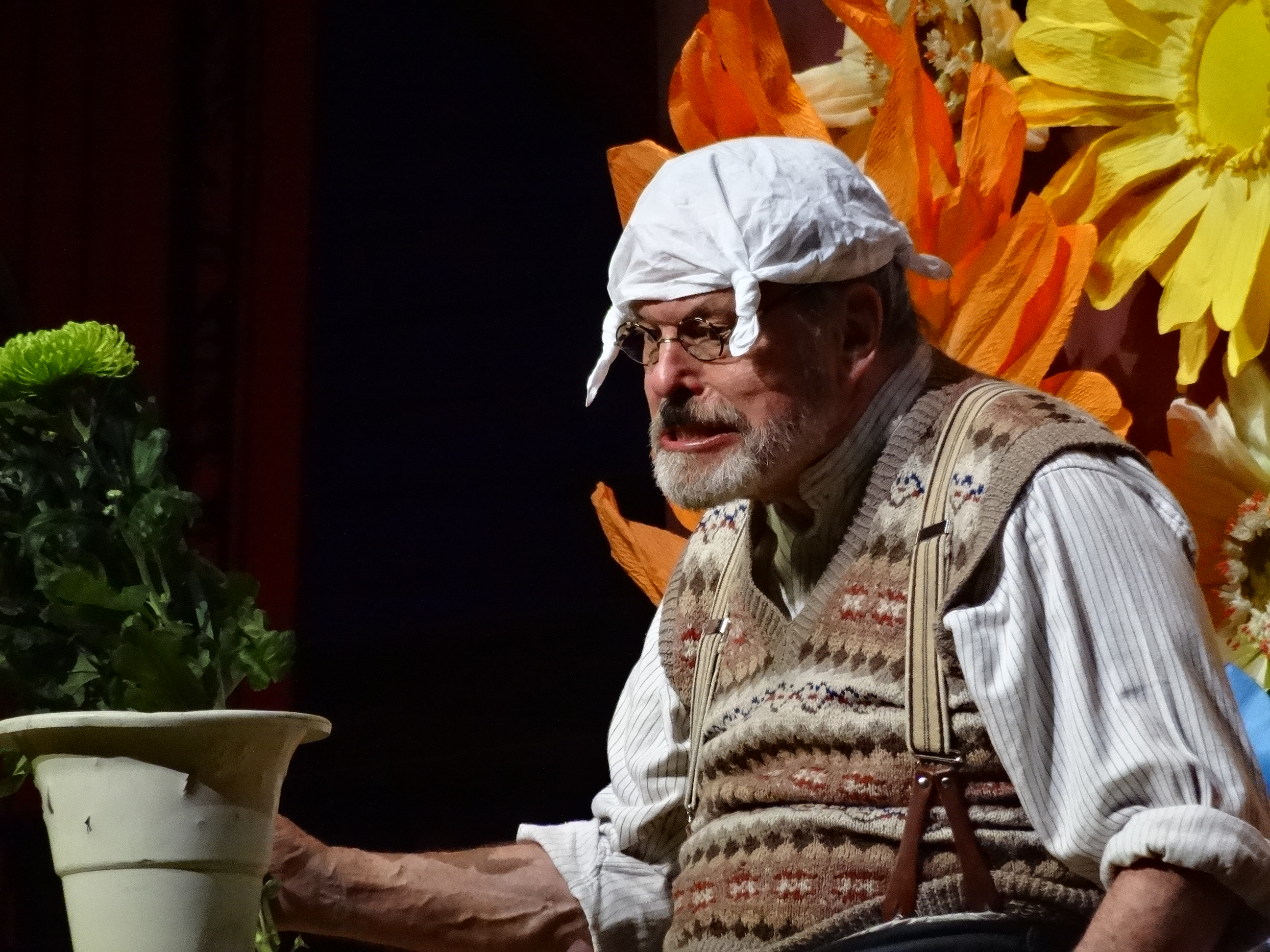
Gumby flower arranging. A character of limited intelligence and vocabulary (a satire on the condescending use of the "man on the street" on TV), he is played here by Terry Gilliam in 2014.

On St George's Day, 23 April 2007, the cast and creators of Spamalot gathered in Trafalgar Square under the tutelage of the two Terrys (Jones and Gilliam) to set a new record for the world's largest coconut orchestra. They led 5,567 people "clip-clopping" in time to the Python classic, "Always Look on the Bright Side of Life", for the Guinness World Records attempt.

On 5 October 2019, to mark the 50th anniversary of Monty Python's first show, the "first official Monty Python Guinness world record attempt" tried to break the record for "the largest gathering of people dressed as Gumbys." A recurring character on the show, a Gumby wears a handkerchief on their head, has spectacles, braces, a knitted tank top, and Wellington boots. The shirt sleeves and trouser legs are always rolled up, exposing their socks and knees. Dimwitted, their most famous catchphrases are "My brain hurts!" and repeated shouts of "Hello!" and "Sorry!"

== Media ==
=== Television ===
- Monty Python's Flying Circus (1969–1974): The show that started the Python phenomenon, see also List of Monty Python's Flying Circus episodes.
- Monty Python's Fliegender Zirkus (1972): Two 45-minute specials were made by WDR for West German television. The first was recorded in German, while the second was in English with German dubbing.
- Monty Python's Personal Best (2006): Six one-hour specials, each episode presenting the best of one member's work.

=== Films ===
Five Monty Python productions were released as theatrical films:

- And Now for Something Completely Different (1971): A collection of sketches from the first and second TV series of Monty Python's Flying Circus re-enacted and shot for film.
- Monty Python and the Holy Grail (1975): King Arthur and his knights embark on a low-budget search for the Holy Grail, encountering humorous obstacles along the way. Some of these turned into stand-alone sketches.
- Monty Python's Life of Brian (1979): Brian is born on the first Christmas, in the stable next to Jesus'. He spends his life being mistaken for a messiah.
- Monty Python Live at the Hollywood Bowl (1982): A videotape recording directed by Terry Hughes of a live performance of sketches, it was originally intended for a TV/video special. It was transferred to 35 mm and given a limited theatrical release in the US.
- Monty Python's The Meaning of Life (1983): An examination of the meaning of life in a series of sketches from conception to death and beyond.

=== Albums ===
- Monty Python's Flying Circus (1970)
- Another Monty Python Record (1971)
- Monty Python's Previous Record (1972)
- The Monty Python Matching Tie and Handkerchief (1973)
- Monty Python Live at Drury Lane (1974)
- The Album of the Soundtrack of the Trailer of the Film of Monty Python and the Holy Grail (1975)
- Monty Python Live at City Center (1976)
- The Monty Python Instant Record Collection (1977)
- Monty Python's Life of Brian (1979)
- Monty Python Examines The Life of Brian (promo) (1979)
- Monty Python's Contractual Obligation Album (1980)
- The Monty Python Instant Record Collection (American version) (1981)
- Monty Python's The Meaning of Life (1983)
- Monty Python's The Meaning of Life: Audio Press Kit (promo) (1983)
- The Final Rip Off (1987)
- Monty Python Sings (1989)
- The Ultimate Monty Python Rip Off (1994)
- Monty Python Sings Again (2014)
- The Hastily Cobbled Together for a Fast Buck Album (unreleased)

=== Theatre ===
- Monty Python's Flying Circus: Between 1974 and 1980 (Live at the Hollywood Bowl was released in 1982, but was performed in 1980), the Pythons made three sketch-based stage shows, comprising mainly material from the original television series.
- Monty Python's Spamalot: Written by Idle and directed by Mike Nichols, with music and lyrics by John Du Prez and Idle, it starred Hank Azaria, Tim Curry, and David Hyde Pierce; Spamalot is a musical adaptation of the film Monty Python and the Holy Grail. It ran in Chicago from 21 December 2004 to 23 January 2005, and began performances on Broadway on 17 March 2005. It won three Tony Awards. It was one of eight UK musicals commemorated on Royal Mail stamps, issued in February 2011.
- Not the Messiah: the Toronto Symphony Orchestra commissioned Idle and John Du Prez to write the music and lyrics of an oratorio based on Monty Python's Life of Brian. Entitled Not the Messiah, it had its world premiere as part of Luminato, a "festival of arts and creativity" taking place 1–10 June 2007 in Toronto, Ontario, Canada. Not the Messiah was conducted by Peter Oundjian, music director of the Toronto Symphony Orchestra, who is Idle's cousin. It was performed by a narrator, the Toronto Symphony Orchestra, with guest soloists and choir. According to Idle, "I promise it will be funnier than Handel, though probably not as good".
- Monty Python Live: One Down, Five to Go: (1–5, 15–16, 18–20 July 2014). The Pythons have stated this is the last live reunion of the remaining members of Monty Python. Held at London's O_{2} Arena, tickets for the first night's show sold out in 43 seconds. The set list included a mix of live performances of their most popular sketches, clips from their shows, and elaborate dance numbers. Each night featured a different celebrity "victim" of the "Blackmail" sketch. The final show was screened to 2,000 cinemas around the world.

=== Books ===
Books by Monty Python

- Monty Python's Big Red Book (1971) ISBN 0-416-66890-9.
- The Brand New Monty Python Bok (1973) ISBN 0-413-30130-3.
- The Fairly Incomplete & Rather Badly Illustrated Monty Python Song Book (1994) ISBN 0-413-69000-8

Script books

- Monty Python and the Holy Grail (1977) ISBN 0-413-38520-5.
- Monty Python's The Life of Brian/MONTYPYTHONSCRAPBOOK (1979, plus script-only reprint) ISBN 0-413-46550-0.
- Monty Python's The Meaning of Life (1983) ISBN 0-413-53380-8.
- Monty Python's Flying Circus – Just The Words Volume 1 (1989) ISBN 0-413-62540-0.
- Monty Python's Flying Circus – Just The Words Volume 2 (1989) ISBN 0-413-62550-8.
- Monty Python's Fliegender Zirkus (edited by Alfred Biolek) (1998)

Compilations

- The Complete Works of Shakespeare and Monty Python. Volume One – Monty Python (1981) ISBN 978-0-413-49450-4.
- The Monty Python Gift Boks (1986)
- A Pocketful of Python Volume 1 (edited by Terry Jones) (1999)
- A Pocketful of Python Volume 2 (edited by John Cleese) (1999)
- A Pocketful of Python Volume 3 (edited by Terry Gilliam) (2000)
- A Pocketful of Python Volume 4 (edited by Michael Palin) (2000)
- A Pocketful of Python Volume 5 (edited by Eric Idle) (2002)

Books about Monty Python by Pythons

- Monty Python Speaks! (edited by David Morgan) (1999)
- The Pythons Autobiography by The Pythons (edited by Bob McCabe) (2003, plus various reformatted editions)
- Monty Python Live! (2009)
- Monty Python at Work (by Michael Palin, compilation of republished diary entries) (2014)
- So, Anyway ... (by John Cleese, Autobiography to age 30) (2014)
- Always Look on the Bright Side of Life (by Eric Idle, Autobiography) (2018) ISBN 978-1-9848-2258-1.

Other books about Monty Python

- Monty Python: The Case Against (by Robert Hewison) (1981)

=== Games ===
- Monty Python's Flying Circus (1990) a video game released by Virgin Games
- Monty Python's Complete Waste of Time (1994) released by 7th Level for Macintosh and MS-DOS
- Monty Python & the Quest for the Holy Grail (1996), official game released by 7th Level
- Monty Python's The Meaning of Life (1997), also released by 7th Level.
- Python-opoly (2007), a Monty Python-themed property game released by Toy Vault
- Monty Python Fluxx (2008), a card game released by Looney Labs
- Monty Python's Cow Tossing (2011), a smartphone game
- Monty Python’s The Ministry of Silly Walks (2014), a smartphone game
- Monty Python’s Cocurricular Mediaeval Reenactment Programme (2025), a tabletop role-playing game

== See also ==
- List of recurring Monty Python's Flying Circus characters
- Python (Monty) Pictures
