= Monty Python's Flying Circus: Just the Words =

Collection of scripts

- Covers of Monty Python's Flying Circus: Just the Words Volumes 1 & 2 hardback, 1989.
- Editor: Roger Wilmut
- Authors: Graham Chapman; John Cleese; Terry Gilliam; Eric Idle; Terry Jones; Michael Palin
- Language: English
- Genre: Humour
- Publisher: Methuen
- Publication date: 5 October 1989
- Publication place: United Kingdom
- English publication date: Print (hardcover)
- ISBN: 0-413-62540-0
- Preceded by: Monty Python's The Meaning of Life
- Followed by: The Fairly Incomplete & Rather Badly Illustrated Monty Python Song Book

Monty Python's Flying Circus: Just the Words is a two volume collection of the scripts for the TV series Monty Python's Flying Circus, published in 1989 on the 20th anniversary of the broadcast of the first episode. Volume 1 features the first 23 episodes, with Volume 2 containing the remaining 22. The books were edited by Roger Wilmut, who transcribed the dialogue from the original programmes, minus the animation sequences. Episodes 3 and 5 of the fourth series are missing some material from their original 1974 broadcast, as they were transcribed from the 1976 edited repeat versions. Both volumes contain black and white stills taken from videotapes of the series. The books were reissued in paperback as one volume.

== Contents ==
=== Volume 1 ===
- 1.1 "Whither Canada?"
- 1.2 "Sex and Violence"
- 1.3 "How to Recognize Different Types of Trees From Quite a Long Way Away"
- 1.4 "Owl-Stretching Time"
- 1.5 "Man's Crisis of Identity in the Latter Half of the Twentieth Century"
- 1.6 "It's the Arts"
- 1.7 "You're No Fun Any More"
- 1.8 "Full Frontal Nudity"
- 1.9 "The Ant, an Introduction"
- 1.10 "Untitled"
- 1.11 "The Royal Philharmonic Orchestra Goes to the Bathroom"
- 1.12 "The Naked Ant"
- 1.13 "Intermission"
- 2.1 "Face the Press"
- 2.2 "The Spanish Inquisition"
- 2.3 "Déjà Vu"
- 2.4 "The Buzz Aldrin Show"
- 2.5 "Live from the Grill-O-Mat"
- 2.6 "It's a Living"
- 2.7 "The Attila the Hun Show"
- 2.8 "Archaeology Today"
- 2.9 "How to Recognize Different Parts of the Body"
- 2.10 "Scott of the Antarctic"
- Appendix: transmission details
- Index of sketches

=== Volume 2 ===
- 2.11 "How Not to Be Seen"
- 2.12 "Spam"
- 2.13 "Royal Episode 13"
- 3.1 "Whicker's World"
- 3.2 "Mr. and Mrs. Brian Norris's Ford Popular"
- 3.3 "The Money Programme"
- 3.4 "Blood, Devastation, Death, War and Horror"
- 3.5 "The All-England Summarize Proust Competition"
- 3.6 "The War Against Pornography"
- 3.7 "Salad Days"
- 3.8 "The Cycling Tour"
- 3.9 "The Nude Organist"
- 3.10 "E. Henry Thripshaw's Disease"
- 3.11 "Dennis Moore"
- 3.12 "A Book at Bedtime"
- 3.13 "Grandstand"
- 4.1 "The Golden Age of Ballooning"
- 4.2 "Michael Ellis"
- 4.3 "Light Entertainment War"
- 4.4 "Hamlet"
- 4.5 "Mr. Neutron"
- 4.6 "Party Political Broadcast"
- Appendix: transmission details
- Index of sketches

== Credits ==
- Authors - Graham Chapman, John Cleese, Terry Gilliam, Eric Idle, Terry Jones, Michael Palin
- Additional material (Volume 2) - Neil Innes, Douglas Adams
- Cover art - Terry Gilliam
- Editor - Roger Wilmut
