= Monty Python's The Life of Brian / Monty Python Scrapbook =

Verry fynny movie that strongly

Monty Python's The Life of Brian/MONTYPYTHONSCRAPBOOK
- Cover of Monty Python's The Life of Brian/MONTYPYTHONSCRAPBOOK paperback, 1979.
- Editor: Eric Idle
- Authors: Graham Chapman; John Cleese; Terry Gilliam; Eric Idle; Terry Jones; Michael Palin
- Language: English
- Genre: Humour
- Publisher: Eyre Methuen
- Publication date: 15 November 1979
- Publication place: United Kingdom
- English publication date: Print (softcover)
- ISBN: 0-413-46550-0
- Preceded by: Monty Python and the Holy Grail (Book)
- Followed by: Monty Python's The Meaning of Life

Monty Python's The Life of Brian/MONTYPYTHONSCRAPBOOK is a large format book by Monty Python, released in 1979 to tie in with their film Monty Python's Life of Brian. As the title suggests, it consists of two separate books joined together. The first contains the film's screenplay, illustrated by black and white stills. On the reverse side is the scrapbook, which contains a variety of material such as scenes cut from the film, newly written material plus unrelated items, including the lyrics to Bruces' Philosophers Song. The book was assembled by Eric Idle, with assistance from Michael Palin.

The book is dedicated to Keith Moon, who was to appear in the film but died just before filming began.

== Contents of scrapbook ==
- How It All Began (Three Kings comic strip)
- How It Really All Began
- Heron Bay Diaries with Terry Jones and Michael Palin
- Monty Python's First Ten Years (A Tribute by The Queen)
- What To Take On filming
- Brian Meets The Psychopath
- Python Cinema Quiz (1)
- Letter to Lorne Michaels
- Python Cinema Quiz (2)
- Brian Feeds the Multitude
- What To Do If You Win...A Granny!
- Research, Costume & Makeup
- Sharing a Caravan With John Cleese
- The Gilliam Collection of Famous Film Titles
- The Healed Loony
- Jerusalem Advocate
- Otto
- Cleese vs. the Evening Standard
- Solidarity
- Python Profiles
- Sermon On The Mount
- The Dead Sea Photos: How They Were Discovered
- Solly and Sarah
- Doc. Chapman's Medical Page
- Monty Python's Flying Circus: An Appreciation by Graham Greene
- The Bruces' Philosophers Song
- A Letter About The Title
- Headmaster
- Martyrdom of St. Brian
- All Things Dull And Ugly

== Credits ==
- Authors - Graham Chapman, John Cleese, Terry Gilliam, Eric Idle, Terry Jones, Michael Palin
- Editor - Eric Idle
- Contributing Editor - Michael Palin
- Designers - Basil Pao, Mike Diehl
- Photography - Drew Mara
- Production Artists - Doug Bevans, Ron & Louise Spencer, Elyse Wyman
- Photography - David Appleby
- Additional Photography - Richard Avedon, Peter Bijou, Larry Dupont, Peter Hall, Gary Heery, Tania Kosevich, Bobby Lavender, Jim McCrary, Eddie Pollock
- Contributing Artists - Terry Gilliam, Neal Adams, Rick Cusick, Ron Kirby
