= Monty Python's The Meaning of Life (book) =

1983 book by Monty Python

- Cover of Monty Python's The Meaning of Life paperback, 1983.
- Authors: Graham Chapman; John Cleese; Terry Gilliam; Eric Idle; Terry Jones; Michael Palin
- Language: English
- Genre: Humour
- Publisher: Methuen
- Publication date: 9 June 1983
- Publication place: United Kingdom
- English publication date: Print (softcover)
- ISBN: 0-413-53380-8
- Preceded by: Monty Python's The Life of Brian/MONTYPYTHONSCRAPBOOK
- Followed by: Monty Python's Flying Circus: Just the Words

Monty Python's The Meaning of Life is the tie-in companion book to the final film by Monty Python. It contains the screenplay, illustrated by many colour stills from the film.

The book contains sections of the film which were cut before the premiere, including "The Adventures of Martin Luther", which was later reinstated for the film's 20th anniversary "Director's Cut" DVD release in 2003. The Crimson Permanent Assurance is placed where it was to originally appear in the film, before it was excised and presented as the supporting feature.

The book concludes with a correspondence of letters between John Cleese and The Sun newspaper, regarding an alleged incident during the film's shooting.

== Contents ==
- A Foreword by The Publishers
- Fish intro
- The Meaning of Life (titles)
- Part I – The Miracle of Birth
- The Miracle of Birth Part 2 – The Third World
- The Adventures of Martin Luther
- Part II – Growth and Learning
- Part III – Fighting Each Other
- The Middle of the Film – Find the Fish
- Part IV – Middle Age
- Part V – Live Organ Transplants
- The Crimson Permanent Assurance
- Part VI – The Autumn Years
- Part VI B – The Meaning of Life
- Part VII – Death
- Cast List
- John Cleese vs. The Sun

== Credits ==
- Authors – Graham Chapman, John Cleese, Terry Gilliam, Eric Idle, Terry Jones, Michael Palin
- Designer – James Campus
- Animation Pages Designer – Kate Hepburn
- Stills Photography – David Appleby
- Additional Stills Photography – Clive Coote, Strat Mastoris
- Studio Assistance – Bridget Tisdall
