= Monty Python's The Ministry of Silly Walks =

2014 video game

- Developer: Boondoggle Studios
- Publisher: Boondoggle Studios
- Platforms: Android, iOS
- Release: 2014
- Genre: Endless runner

Monty Python's The Ministry of Silly Walks is a 2014 mobile game from Boondoggle Studios. The game is based on the Monty Python sketch known by the same name.

== Gameplay ==
Monty Python's The Ministry of Silly Walks is a game in which players control a character with a comically exaggerated stride. The game plays like an endless runner—but instead of sprinting, players silly walk through a cityscape filled with slapstick hazards. Each run starts in the Ministry, then spills onto randomly generated streets filled with obstacles like birds, tea spills, and park benches. Speed steadily increases, making progression chaotic until the inevitable wipeout, accompanied by ragdoll physics and theatrical flailing. Players collect coins to unlock performance-boosting power-ups and outfits in the shop. From magnetic coin-draws to temporary invincibility, these upgrades help navigate the mayhem. The experience includes authentic voice clips, and no in-app purchases.

== Development ==
The game was voiced by John Cleese.

== Reception ==
Reception

Review scores
Publication	Score
Pocket Gamer	2/5
Jeuxvideo.com	7/20

Pocket Gamer gave the game a score of 2 out of 5, stating: "A tragically uninteresting endless runner that squanders a good idea and spits out something that's about as funny as a dead parrot". Jeuxvideo also called it uninteresting, criticizing the game's repetitiveness and lack of originality.
