= Monty Python and the Holy Grail (Book) =

Tie-in book linked to a film

- Cover of Monty Python and the Holy Grail (Book) paperback, 1977.
- Editor: Terry Jones
- Authors: Graham Chapman; John Cleese; Terry Gilliam; Eric Idle; Terry Jones; Michael Palin
- Language: English
- Genre: Humour
- Publisher: Eyre Methuen
- Publication date: 1 September 1977
- Publication place: United Kingdom
- English publication date: Print (softcover)
- ISBN: 0-413-38520-5
- Preceded by: The Brand New Monty Python Bok
- Followed by: Monty Python's The Life of Brian/MONTYPYTHONSCRAPBOOK

Monty Python and the Holy Grail (Book), also known as Mønti Pythøn ik den Hølie Gräilen (Bøk), is the literary companion to the 1975 film of the same name, assembled by co-director Terry Jones.

Released in 1977, the main body of the book is the final draft of the screenplay, complete with sections that were cut from the final film scribbled out. Also included is the first draft, much of which bears little resemblance to the final product and parts of which ended up in the fourth series of Monty Python, following John Cleese's departure. Many photographs and Terry Gilliam sketches appear throughout the book.

The original release was issued in a plain black cover bearing the title and a cut out window revealing the typeface of the first draft. Subsequent reprints have used a different design, losing the cut out window and adding stills from the film.

== Contents ==
- Monty Python's Second Film (First Draft)
- A Letter to Michael Palin From the Producer
- Trailer Script/Lobby Cards
- Monty Python and the Holy Grail - Final Draft
- Statement of Financial Position and Cost of Production Statement

== Credits ==
- Authors - Graham Chapman, John Cleese, Terry Gilliam, Eric Idle, Terry Jones, Michael Palin
- Editor - Terry Jones
- Designer - Derek Birdsall
- Photography - Drew Mara
