= List of Monty Python's Flying Circus episodes =

Monty Python's Flying Circus is a British surreal sketch comedy series created by and starring Graham Chapman, John Cleese, Eric Idle, Terry Jones, Michael Palin and Terry Gilliam, who became known as "Monty Python", for BBC1. The series stands out for its use of absurd situations, mixed with risqué and innuendo-laden humour, sight gags and observational sketches without punchlines. Live action segments were broken up with animations by Gilliam, often merging with the live action to form segues. It premiered on 5 October 1969 and ended on 5 December 1974, with a total of 45 episodes over the course of 4 series.

== Series overview ==
Series	Episodes	Originally released	
Series	Episodes	First released	Last released
1	13	5 October 1969	11 January 1970
2	13	15 September 1970	22 December 1970
3	13	19 October 1972	18 January 1973
Specials	2	3 January 1972	18 December 1972
4	6	31 October 1974	5 December 1974

== Episodes ==
=== Series 1 (1969–70) ===
No. overall	No. in series	Title	Original release date
1	1	"Whither Canada?"	5 October 1969
It's Wolfgang Amadeus Mozart/Famous Deaths; Italian Lesson – written by Michael Palin and Terry Jones; Whizzo Butter – a parody of the commercials for Stork SB Margarine; the word 'Whizzo' would be used throughout the series as the title of various companies and products, such as 'The Whizzo Quality Assortment' produced by the 'Whizzo Chocolate Company' (within the Crunchy Frog sketch of Episode 6).; It's the Arts: Interview with Sir Edward Ross; Arthur 'Two Sheds' Jackson – written by John Cleese and Graham Chapman; Picasso/Cycling Race – introduced as "the momentous artistic event in which Pablo Picasso is doing a specially commissioned painting for us whilst riding a bicycle."; The Funniest Joke in the World – first appearance of The Colonel
2	2	"Sex and Violence"	12 October 1969
Flying Sheep – written by Cleese and Chapman; French Lecture on Sheep-Aircraft; A Man with Three Buttocks – first appearance of the phrase 'And now for something completely different'.; Musical Mice; Marriage Guidance Counsellor – written by Eric Idle; The Wacky Queen; Working-Class Playwright; The Wrestling Epilogue – written by Eric Idle; real professional wrestlers portrayed a monsignor and a college professor who debate the existence of God by wrestling.; The Mouse Problem – written by Cleese and Chapman
3	3	"How to Recognise Different Types of Trees from Quite a Long Way Away"	19 October 1969
Court Scene (Witness in a Coffin/Cardinal Richelieu) – written by Cleese and Chapman; Bicycle Repair Man – written by Palin and Jones; parody of the Superman franchise; Children's Stories; The Dirty Fork – introduced by a compère (Michael Palin) who says, "and they've called this little number—here it is, it's called—Restaurant Sketch."; Seduced Milkmen; Stolen Newsreader; Children's Interview; Nudge Nudge – written by Idle
4	4	"Owl-Stretching Time"	26 October 1969
Song: "Jerusalem (And did those feet)"; Art Gallery; It's a Dog's Life in the Modern Army; Undressing in Public – written by Palin and Jones; Self-Defence Against Fresh Fruit – written by Cleese and Chapman; the first appearance of the 16-Ton Weight; Secret Service Dentists; Note: Many sketches in this episode are ended prematurely by Chapman's army character ("The Colonel"), who protests rip-offs of the British Army's slogan, "It's a Man's Life in the Modern Army" Note: Owl Stretching Time was a proposed name for the series itself.
5	5	"Man's Crisis of Identity in the Latter Half of the 20th Century"	16 November 1969
Confuse-a-Cat – written by Cleese and Chapman; The Smuggler; A Duck, A Cat and A Lizard – a televised discussion group; Vox Pops on Smuggling; Police Raid; Letters and Vox Pops; Newsreader Arrested; Erotic Film; Silly Job Interview – first appeared in How to Irritate People.; Careers Advisory Board; Burglar or Encyclopaedia Salesman?; Note: BBC1 officially began broadcasting in colour on 15 November 1969; but for the previous two months, they had been broadcasting colour programmes "unofficially", so while the whole of the first series was broadcast in colour, this episode was the first to be advertised as being in colour (source: notes taken from BBC videotape operators and transmission managers made at the time). This was also the first episode where Cleese says the title in a silly voice rather than calmly in his normal voice.
6	6	"It's the Arts" "The BBC Entry for the Zinc Stoat of Budapest"	23 November 1969
It's the Arts: Johann Gambolputty; Non-Illegal Robbery; Vox Pops on Burglary; Crunchy Frog – written by Cleese and Chapman; The Dull Life of a City Stockbroker – written by Chapman and Idle; Red Indian in a Theatre – introduced with "Coming right up: the Theatre Sketch. So don't move!"; Policemen Make Wonderful Friends; A Scotsman on A Horse; 20th Century Vole – written by Cleese and Chapman; parody of the Hollywood movie industry
7	7	"You're No Fun Anymore"	30 November 1969
Camel Spotting; You're No Fun Anymore; The Audit; Science Fiction Sketch: Man Turns into Scotsman; Blancmanges Playing Tennis
8	8	"Full Frontal Nudity"	7 December 1969
Army Protection Racket – written by Cleese and Palin; Vox Pops on Full Frontal Nudity; Art Critic on The Place of the Nude; Buying a Bed; Hermits; Dead Parrot – written by Cleese and Chapman; The Flasher; Hell's Grannies – the theme song from the James Bond film Thunderball is heard.; Note: This episode repeats several running gags from Episode 4: a female cast member delivers a terrible joke, and upon protest from fellow cast members, wails 'But it's my only line!'; the use of the song "Jerusalem", and the Colonel preempting sketches–this time protesting that they are 'too silly'.
9	9	"The Ant, An Introduction"	14 December 1969
Llamas – sketch is in Spanish with English subtitles; A Man with a Tape Recorder Up His Nose; Kilimanjaro Expedition – written by Cleese and Idle; A Man with a Tape Recorder Up His Brother's Nose; Homicidal Barber – written by Palin and Jones; The Lumberjack Song – written by Palin, Jones and Fred Tomlinson; Letter and Britain's Joke for the Rubber Mac of Zurich Award; Gumby Crooner – the first Gumby sketch.; The Refreshment Room at Bletchley – the music is "Banjoreno" by the Dixieland Jug Blowers.; Hunting Film – written by Palin and Jones; the music is "Waltzing trumpets" by Harry Mortimer.; The Visitors – concludes with "Ding Dong Merrily on High"
10	10	"Untitled"	21 December 1969
Walk-on Part in a Sketch; Bank Robber in a Lingerie Shop; Trailer/David Unction; It's A Tree/Arthur Tree; Vocational Guidance Counsellor; The First Man to Jump the Channel – the naïve and trusting Ron Obvious (Terry Jones) is encouraged by his unscrupulous manager Luigi Vercotti (Michael Palin) to attempt a series of impossible tasks for publicity. The tasks include jumping over the English Channel (a distance of 26 miles), eating Chichester Cathedral (a stone building) and tunnelling from Godalming to Java (Godalming and Java are on opposite side of the planet).; Pet Conversions – written by Chapman; Gorilla Librarian; Letters to Daily Mirror; Strangers in the Night – first appearance of Biggles and Algy.; Note: This is the first episode not to show an episode title at the beginning of the closing credits.
11	11	"The Royal Philharmonic Orchestra Goes to the Bathroom"	28 December 1969
Lavatorial Humour – the RPO performs the opening of Tchaikovsky's Piano Concerto No. 1 in the bathroom.; Interruptions – Professor R. J. Canning tries to record the introduction to The World of History but is repeatedly interrupted by the undertakers (the first scenes of the Undertakers Film).; Agatha Christie Sketch (Inspector Tiger); Undertakers Film – continued; Literary Football Discussion/Interview with Jimmy Buzzard; Undertakers Film – continued; Interesting People – sketch opens with a compère (Palin) saying, "Hello, good evening, and welcome to yet another edition of Interesting People."; one of the acts plays a version of All Through The Night, but the song is misidentified by the compère as Men of Harlech.; Undertakers Film – continued; The World of History: Social Legislation in the 18th Century; The Battle of Trafalgar; Batley Townswomen's Guild Presents the Battle of Pearl Harbor – written by Idle; Undertakers Film – the conclusion
12	12	"The Naked Ant"	4 January 1970
People Falling From Buildings; Spectrum/Talking About Things – sketch opens with the presenter (Palin) saying, "Good evening. Tonight Spectrum looks at one of the major problems in the world today—that old vexed question of what is going on."; Visitors From Coventry; Mr. Hilter/The Minehead By-election – written by Cleese and Palin; Silly Voices at the Police Station; Upper Class Twit of the Year – written by Cleese and Chapman; Ken Shabby – sketch includes Connie Booth; How Far Can a Minister Fall? – introduced by a voice-over (Cleese) saying, "There now follows a Party Political Broadcast on behalf of the Wood Party."; Nobody Has Anything Else to Say
13	13	"Intermission"	11 January 1970
Intermissions – a short intermission immediately followed by a medium-sized intermission; the music is Theme from A Summer Place.; Restaurant Sketch (Abuse/Cannibalism); Advertisements - introduced by a voice-over (Terry Jones) that says, "There will now be a whopping great intermission"; Albatross!; Come Back to My Place – written by Chapman; Me Doctor, You Mr. Burtenshaw; What Gumbys Would Like; Historical Impersonations: Cardinal Richelieu as Petula Clark; Julius Caesar as Eddie Waring; Florence Nightingale as Brian London; Ivan the Terrible as a sales assistant at Freeman, Hardy and Willis; W. G. Grace as a music box; Napoleon as the R101 disaster; John the Baptist as Graham Hill; Wishes/More Fairy Stories About the Police; Probe Around on Crime – sketch opens with a presenter (Cleese) saying, "Yes, tonight Probe Around takes a look at crime."; a parody of Panorama; Stonehenge and Mr. Attila the Hun; Psychiatry – written by Cleese and Chapman; features "Going to the Zoo" by Tom Paxton, with vocals by Julie Felix.; Operating Theatre

=== Series 2 (1970) ===
No. overall	No. in series	Title	Original release date
14	1	"Face the Press" "Dinsdale!"	15 September 1970
Face the Press; New Cooker Sketch; Tobacconist's/Prostitute Advert; The Ministry of Silly Walks – written by Palin and Jones; Ethel the Frog/Piranha Brothers – written by Cleese and Chapman; the introductory music is from the Karelia Suite by Jean Sibelius
15	2	"The Spanish Inquisition"	22 September 1970
Man-Powered Flight; The Spanish Inquisition – written by Palin and Jones; Jokes and Novelties Salesman; Tax on Thingy; Vox Pops on Taxation – includes a rare piece of meaningful dialogue from the "It's" Man; Photos of Uncle Ted; The Spanish Inquisition (continued); Films by 20th Century Vole: The Semaphore Version of Wuthering Heights; Julius Caesar on an Aldis Lamp; Gunfight at the O.K. Corral in Morse Code; The Smoke Signal Version of Gentlemen Prefer Blondes; Court Scene (Charades); Race Against the Credits – the music is Devil's Galop by Charles Williams
16	3	"Déjà Vu" "Show 5"	29 September 1970
A Bishop Rehearsing; Flying Lessons – written by Cleese and Chapman; Hijacked Plane/To Luton; The Poet Ewan McTeagle; Hand Trees (animation); Psychiatrist Milkman; Déjà Vu; Note: This episode introduces a running gag that is used for the next two episodes: a character says, 'Walk this way.' The character told this responds, 'If I could walk that way...' only to be stopped when the first character warns them about finishing the punchline, by raising a finger.
17	4	"The Buzz Aldrin Show"	20 October 1970
Metamorphosis (animation) – this is the first episode to begin with a piece of animation.; An Apology (Gumby Announcement); Architects Sketch – written by Cleese and Chapman; How to Recognise a Mason; An Apology (Another Gumby Announcement); Motor Insurance Sketch; The Bishop – parody of the TV series The Saint; the Peter Gunn Theme by Henry Mancini is prominent.; Living Room on Pavement; A Choice of Viewing/Interview With a Nude Man – introduced as "a discussion on censorship between Derek Hart, The Bishop of Woolwich and a nude man."; An Apology (Gumby Frog Curse/Another Another Gumby Announcement); The Chemist Sketch; An Apology (Words Not to be Used Again) – the words are shown on slides: "B*M", "B*TTY", "P*X", "KN*CKERS" (shown twice, for 'knickers' and 'knockers'), "W**-W**" and "SEMPRINI".; A Less Naughty Chemist's – the 'walk this way' gag is used again, but this time the punchline is said out loud, resulting in the character who says it being taken away by a police constable.; A Not at All Naughty Chemist's; Vox Pops on Aftershave – Cardinal Ximénez (Palin) from The Spanish Inquisition makes a cameo appearance; Police Constable Pan-Am; An Apology (About Police Constable Pan-Am) – followed by the end credits; Last Gumby Announcement
18	5	"Live from the Grill-O-Mat Snack Bar, Paignton"	27 October 1970
Live From the Grill-o-Mat Snack Bar, Paignton; The First Item on the Menu: Blackmail – written by Palin and Jones; the first appearance of the Nude Organist, played in this season by Gilliam.; The Society for Putting Things on Top of Other Things; Escape From Film – members of the Society for Putting Things on Top of Other Things notice that they are trapped inside a film and subsequently try to escape; The Next Item on the Menu: Current Affairs; Escape From Film (continued); Our Main Course: Prawn Salad Ltd./Accidents Sketch; Escape From Film (conclusion); Seven Brides for Seven Brothers, presented by the staff and pupils of the Dibley School for Boys; The Butcher Who is Alternately Rude and Polite; The Last Item on our Menu: Ken Clean-Air Systems; On the Bus; Notes: The 'walk this way' gag is used for the last time, except the words 'I' and 'walk' are replaced with 'we' (since it is a group of people) and 'run', respectively. This episode is structured as a frame narrative.
19	6	"It's a Living" "School Prizes"	3 November 1970
It's A Living; The Time on BBC1; School Prize-Giving; Films by Mr. Dibley; The Foreign Secretary and Other News; Free Dung from the Book of the Month Club; Timmy Williams' Coffee Time – a parody of David Frost; Interview with Raymond Luxury-Yacht; Registry Office Marriage; Election Night Special/The Silly Party and the Sensible Party
20	7	"The Attila the Hun Show"	10 November 1970
The Attila the Hun Show – parody of The Debbie Reynolds Show, recreating the opening credits shot for shot and using a knock-off of the theme "With A Little Love" by Mike LeRoy. The opening sequence appears after this sketch.; Attila the Nun; Secretary of State Striptease; Vox Pops on Political Groupies; Council Ratcatcher; Killer Sheep; The Idiot in Society – a mockumentary; Take Your Pick sketch – a parody of the game show Take Your Pick!, which had been cancelled roughly two years earlier.
21	8	"Archaeology Today"	17 November 1970
Programmes Coming Soon to BBC Television – followed by the opening credits; Archaeology Today; An Appeal for Sanity from the Reverend Arthur Belling; An Appeal on Behalf of the National Truss; Registrar of Marriages/Wife Exchange; Silly Doctor Sketch (immediately abandoned); Mr. and Mrs. Git; Roy and Hank Spim: Mosquito Hunters; Extremely Camp Judges; Mrs. Thing and Mrs. Entity; Beethoven's Mynah Bird; Colin "Chopper" Mozart: Ratcatcher; Extremely Camp Judges (continued)
22	9	"How to Recognise Different Parts of the Body"	24 November 1970
How to Recognise Different Parts of the Body; Bruces sketch – written by Cleese and Idle; How to Recognise Different Parts of the Body (continued); The Man Who Contradicts People; Cosmetic Surgery on Raymond Luxury-Yacht; Camp Square-Bashing; Killer Cars (animation); Cut-Price Airline; Batley Townswomen's Guild Presents the First Heart Transplant – written by Idle; The First Underwater Production of Measure for Measure; How to Recognise Different Parts of the Body (continued); The Death of Mary, Queen of Scots; Exploding Penguin on the TV Set – written by Cleese and Chapman; How to Recognise Different Parts of the Body (continued); There's Been A Murder; Europolice Song Contest: Sgt. Duckie's Song; Bing Tiddle Tiddle Bong (song) – the winning entry from Monaco; written by Chapman and Fred Tomlinson; How to Recognise Different Parts of the Body (conclusion); Note: The title card has the word "Recognise" spelled the American way (with a "z"), most probably because it was created by the American Terry Gilliam.
23	10	"Scott of the Antarctic"	1 December 1970
French Subtitled Film; Scott of the Antarctic; Scott of the Sahara – the opening sequence appears after this sketch, seventeen-and-a-half minutes (out of thirty) into the episode.; Conrad Poohs and His Dancing Teeth (animation) – the music is Under the Double Eagle by Josef Wagner; Fish Licence; Derby Council v. All Blacks Rugby Match; Long John Silver Impersonators v. Bournemouth Gynaecologists
24	11	"How Not to Be Seen"	8 December 1970
Conquistador Coffee Campaign; Repeating Groove – Cleese's 'And now for something completely different' and the opening sequence have a repeating groove.; Ramsay MacDonald Striptease; Job Hunter; International Chinese Communist Conspiracy (animation); Crelm Toothpaste and Shrill Petrol (animation); Agatha Christie Sketch (Railway Timetables); Mr Neville Shunte: Railroad Playwright; Gavin Millarrrrrrrrr Writes; Film Director / Dentist Martin Curry (teeth); City Gents Vox Pops; Crackpot Religions Ltd. – a parody religious version of the game show Sale of the Century, which had just been pitched to British television. A scene at the end, with crosses that are actually telegraph poles, was cut but it can be seen at the end of the episode when the whole programme is repeated on fast-forward.; How Not to Be Seen – written by Palin and Jones; Crossing the Atlantic on a Tricycle; Interview in Filing Cabinet; "Yummy Yummy Yummy, I've Got Love in My Tummy" / Music Time; the end credits appear here.; Monty Python's Flying Circus Again in Thirty Seconds – a recap of the episode.
25	12	"Spam"	15 December 1970
The Black Eagle – parody of buccaneer film The Black Swan; Dirty Hungarian Phrasebook – written by Cleese; the court scene includes another reference to Take Your Pick!, where the prosecutor gongs Alexander Yalt (Michael Palin) for answering 'yes' after a series of questions.; World Forum/Communist Quiz; Ypres 1914 (abandoned) – an attempt at filming a scene set during the First Battle of Ypres goes poorly and they decide to try again later. Sketch written by Palin and Jones.; Art Gallery Strikes; Ypres 1914 – written by Palin and Jones; Hospital for Over-Actors – the hospital has an entire ward for actors playing the titular part in Shakespeare's The Tragedy of Richard the Third.; Gumby Flower Arranging; Spam – written by Palin and Jones
26	13	"Royal Episode Thirteen"	22 December 1970
The Queen Will Be Watching – in honour of Her Majesty the Queen, who is presumed be watching, a shortened and very regal animated opening sequence plays "Pomp and Circumstance" in place of "The Liberty Bell".; Coal Mine in Llanddarog Carmarthen – an argument between coal miners about The Treaty of Utrecht needs to be broken up by the foreman, who is also asked to settle a disagreement about the name of a particular element of classical Greek architecture (the options are metope or abacus). The miners appear to be enthusiastic patrons of their local miners' institute library.; The Toad Elevating Moment; Commercials; Fish Club/How to Feed a Goldfish; The Man Who Collects Birdwatcher's Eggs; Life Insurance Sketch; Hospital Run by RSM; Exploding Version of "The Blue Danube"; Girls' Boarding School; Submarine; Lifeboat (Cannibalism); Undertakers sketch – written by Cleese and Chapman; Note: Features an uncredited cameo by News at Ten presenter Reginald Bosanquet, recorded at the studios of ITN

=== Series 3 (1972–73) ===
In this series only, the opening sequence begins with a nude organist (played by Jones), Cleese saying 'and now', and the 'It's' Man.

No. overall	No. in series	Title	Original release date
27	1	"Whicker's World" "Njorl's Saga"	19 October 1972
Njorl's Saga, Part I; Court Scene (Multiple Murderer); Investigating the Body (animation); Njorl's Saga, Part II; A Terrible Mess; Njorl's Saga, Part II: North Malden?; Starting Over; Njorl's Saga, Part II: Invest in Malden?; Phone Conversation About the Word 'Malden' in the Saga; Njorl's Saga, Part III/Court Scene (Viking); Stock Exchange Report; Mrs. Premise and Mrs. Conclusion at the Launderette – written by Cleese and Chapman; Mrs. Premise and Mrs. Conclusion at North Malden – written by Cleese and Chapman; Back to the Saga...; Njorl's Saga, Part IV: Mrs. Premise and Mrs. Conclusion visit Sartre in Paris – written by Cleese and Chapman; Whicker Island – a parody of Whicker's World
28	2	"Mr. and Mrs. Brian Norris' Ford Popular"	26 October 1972
Emigration from Surbiton to Hounslow – the opening sequence follows this sketch.; Schoolboys' Life Assurance Company; How To Do It: How To Rid The World of All Known Diseases – a parody of Blue Peter (which was about to celebrate its 14th anniversary at the time this episode was transmitted); Mrs. Niggerbaiter Explodes; Farming Club: The Life of Peter Ilyich Tschaikowsky; Trim-Jeans Theatre; The Fish-Slapping Dance – written by Palin and Jones; The Sinking of the SS Mother Goose; The BBC is Short of Money; Doing the Horse of the Year Show in Mrs. Kelly's Flat; The "It's" Man Show – Ringo Starr and Lulu both make cameo appearances.
29	3	"The Money Programme"	2 November 1972
There is Nothing Quite so Wonderful as Money (song) – parody of The Money Programme; written by Idle and John Gould; Erizabeth L – a parody of BBC drama Elizabeth R. The sketch ends when a character is arrested by "Inspector Leopard of Scotland Yard, Special Fraud Film Directors Squad" for impersonating famous Italian director Luchino Visconti.; Salvation Fuzz/Dead Bishop; Jungle Restaurant; Apology for Violence and Nudity; Ken Russell's Gardening Club – introduced as "a scene from a repeat of 'Gardening Club' for 1958". BBC's Gardening Club, presented by Percy Thrower, was the forerunner of Gardeners' World.; The Lost World of Roiurama – sketch ends when a character is arrested by "Inspector Baboon of Scotland Yard's Special Fraud Film Director Squad, Jungle Division" for impersonating famous Italian director Michelangelo Antonioni.; Argument Clinic – written by Cleese and Chapman; Hitting on the Head Lessons; Inspector Flying Fox of the Yard
30	4	"Blood, Devastation, Death, War and Horror"	9 November 1972
Blood, Devastation, Death, War and Horror; The Man Who Speaks in Anagrams – written by Idle; the opening sequence follows this sketch.; Anagram Quiz; Merchant Banker – written by Cleese and Chapman; Pantomime Horses; Life and Death Struggles; House-hunters; Mary Recruitment Office; Bus Conductor Sketch; The Man Who Makes People Laugh Uncontrollably; Army Captain as Clown; Gestures to Indicate Pauses in a Televised Talk; Neurotic Announcers; The News with Richard Baker (vision only); The Pantomime Horse is a Secret Agent; Notes: Anagrams appear throughout this episode: 'Tony M. Nyphot's Flying Risccu' for the programme itself; 'Chamran Knebt' for Merchant Bank, and 'Mary Recruitment Office' for Army Recruitment Office. The end credits are all in anagrams. Richard Baker also does gestures to indicate pauses in the news.
31	5	"The All-England Summarize Proust Competition"	16 November 1972
Summarize Proust Competition – written by Palin and Jones; Hairdressers Climb Up Mount Everest; A Magnificent Festering; Fire Brigade; Our Eamonn; "Party Hints" with Veronica Smalls; Language Laboratory; Travel Agent – written by Cleese and Chapman; Watney's Red Barrel – written by Idle; Watney's Red Barrel is a beer made by Watney Combe & Reid; Anne Elk's Theory on Brontosauruses – written by Cleese and Chapman; Note: A running gag throughout this episode is that whenever anyone answers the phone, they take off their shoe as if the person on the other end had asked their shoe size.
32	6	"The War Against Pornography"	23 November 1972
Tory Housewives Clean-up Campaign – a parody of Mary Whitehouse; Gumby Brain Specialist – the catchphrase, 'My brain hurts!' is born.; Molluscs – "Live" TV Documentary; Report on the Minister Reports; Tuesday Documentary; Children's Story; Match of the Day; An Apology; Expedition to Lake Pahoe; The Silliest Interview We've Ever Had; The Silliest Sketch We've Ever Done
33	7	"Salad Days"	30 November 1972
Biggles Dictates a Letter – in some video editions, a technical glitch cuts some of the dialogue; but the complete original does exist.; Climbing the North Face of the Uxbridge Road; Lifeboat; Old Lady Snoopers; Storage Jars; TV is Bad For Your Eyes (animation); The Show so Far; Cheese Shop sketch – written by Cleese and Chapman; Philip Jenkinson on Cheese Westerns; Sam Peckinpah's "Salad Days"; Apology; The News with Richard Baker; Seashore Interlude Film
34	8	"The Cycling Tour"	7 December 1972
Mr. Pither; Mr. Gulliver (who thinks he is Clodagh Rodgers); Trotsky; Smolensk; Bingo-Crazed Chinese; Not Secret Police; Trotsky / Eartha Kitt; Firing Squad; Eartha Kitt / Edward Heath; Narrow Escape/Credits; Monsters Dance to "Jack in the Box"; Notes: This episode is the first Flying Circus to feature a full-length story. It is also the first that does not have a formal opening sequence; instead, a simple caption ("The Cycling Tour") appears at the beginning. Chapman's adopted son, John Tomiczek, makes a brief non-speaking appearance as an autograph seeker. The episode was written by Palin and Jones with the exception of the last third which was re-written by Cleese and Chapman. Palin and Jones play only one character each throughout the whole episode (although Jones, suffering from amnesia, imagines himself as Clodagh Rogers, Leon Trotsky, Eartha Kitt and Edward Heath). The music to which Mr. Pither cycles is the Waltz from Act II of Faust by Charles Gounod.
35	9	"The Nude Organist" "The Nude Man"	14 December 1972
Bomb on Plane; A Naked Man – the opening sequence appears after this sketch.; Ten Seconds of Sex; Housing Project Built by Characters from Nineteenth-century English Literature; M1 Interchange Built by Characters from Paradise Lost; Mystico and Janet – Flats Built by Hypnosis; Mortuary Hour; The Olympic Hide-and-Seek Final; The Cheap-Laughs; Bull-Fighting; The British Well-Basically Club; Prices on the Planet Algon – written by Palin and Jones; Mr. Badger Reads the Credits; Note: Most sketches are interrupted by Mr. Badger (Idle) right from the first sketch onwards. In addition, Palin's Compère and Gilliam's Knight both made one-time reappearances since Series 1 in this episode (there is also a reference to Episode 3 in this scene, in which there are two people carrying a donkey).
36	10	"E. Henry Thripshaw's Disease"	21 December 1972
Tudor Jobs Agency; Pornographic Bookshop; Elizabethan Pornography Smugglers vs. Sir Philip Sidney; Silly Disturbances; The Free Repetition of Doubtful Words Sketch; 'Is There?'... Life after Death?; The Man Who Says Words in the Wrong Order; Thripshaw's Disease – the footage representing the movie version of Thripshaw's Disease was taken from the Polish movie Knights of the Teutonic Order, made in 1960.; Silly Noises; Sherry-Drinking Vicar; Note: The BBC censored this episode probably more than any other, cutting three sketches (Big Nosed Sculptor, Revolting Cocktails, Wee-Wee Wine Cellar) as well as much of Gilliam's animation.
37	11	"Dennis Moore"	4 January 1973
"Boxing Tonight" – Jack Bodell v. Sir Kenneth Clark; Dennis Moore – written by Cleese and Chapman, obsessed with stealing lupins for the rural poor; What the Stars Foretell – written by Palin and Jones (as a parody of the Cleese/Chapman writing style); Doctor; TV4 or Not TV4 – Discussion; Lupins – written by Cleese and Chapman; Ideal Loon Exhibition; Off-Licence; Dennis Moore Rides Again – written by Cleese and Chapman; Prejudice; Redistribution of Wealth – written by Cleese and Chapman
38	12	"A Book at Bedtime"	11 January 1973
Party Political Broadcast (Choreographed) *Conservative party; A Book at Bedtime – "Redgauntlet"; Kamikaze Scotsmen; No Time to Lose; Frontiers of Medicine – Penguins; BBC programme planners; Unexploded Scotsmen; Spot the Looney; Rival Documentaries; Dad's Doctors, Dad's Pooves and Other Interesting Stories; Note: "Party Political Broadcast (Choreographed)" and "Dad's Doctors, Dad's Pooves and Other Interesting Stories" have been cut from many versions of this episode. A clip of "Party Political Broadcast (Choreographed)" has surfaced on YouTube, while "Dad's Doctors" has been restored to the iTunes and the Blu-ray versions of the series, as well as added to the Netflix streaming video version.
39	13	"Grandstand" "The British Showbiz Awards"	18 January 1973
Thames TV Introduction, with (the real) David Hamilton; "Light Entertainment Awards" with Dickie Attenborough; Dickie Attenborough; The Oscar Wilde Sketch; Charwoman (animation); David Niven's Fridge; Pasolini's Film "The Third Test Match"; New Brain from Curry's; Blood Donor; International Wife-Swapping; Credits of the Year – the moment when the two men are discovered in bed together is John Cleese's last appearance in the series.; The Dirty Vicar Sketch; Notes: During the Light Entertainment Awards, Richard Baker briefly re-appears, saying 'Lemon Curry?' This is the second episode without a formal opening sequence. Cleese does not appear in the awards ceremony or in any sketch made afterward.

=== Monty Python's Fliegender Zirkus (1972) ===
Special episodes of Monty Python's Fliegender Zirkus

Title	Original release date
Blödeln für Deutschland (Fooling around for Germany)	3 January 1972
An Introduction to Monty Python By Frau Newsreader Claudia Doren; The Journey of The Olympic Flame; Monty Python's Guide to Albrecht Dürer; Anita Ekberg Sings Albrecht Dürer; The Merchant of Venice as performed by a herd of cows; Doctor Breeder; Flashers' Love Story (animated); Little Red Riding Hood; Silly Olympics; Stake Your Claim; The Lumberjack Song with The Austrian Border Police; The Bavarian Restaurant; Note: Edited versions of the "Little Red Riding Hood" and "Silly Olympics" sketches were dubbed into English for use in the Python stage shows. The "Flashers' Love Story" animated segment was also used. The Stake Your Claim sketch was included on the English-language record Another Monty Python Record.
Blödeln auf die feine Englische Art (Fooling around in the fine English way)	18 December 1972
William Tell; Euro Sex Maniacs; The Sycophancy Show; Mouse Reserve/Fish Park; Chicken Mining; Heinrich Bonner, Fleabuster (animated); The Philosophers' Football Match – Greeks vs Germans, First Half; Colin "Bomber" Harris vs Colin "Bomber" Harris; The Philosophers' Football Match – Greeks vs Germans, Second Half; 10 Seconds of Sex; I Want A Hearing Aid; The Tale of Happy Valley (The Princess with The Wooden Teeth); Note: Both parts of "The Philosophers' Football Match" were included in the Python stage shows. An abridged version of "The Tale of Happy Valley" was recorded for the English-language record Monty Python's Previous Record. "Colin 'Bomber' Harris vs Colin 'Bomber' Harris" and "I Want a Hearing Aid" were both originally performed on At Last the 1948 Show, which predated Monty Python.

=== Series 4 (1974) ===
Cleese did not return for the final series. The series was broadcast under the simple banner Monty Python (although the old full title, Monty Python's Flying Circus, is displayed at the beginning of the opening sequence). Cleese did receive writing credits on some episodes that featured material he had written for the first draft of Monty Python and the Holy Grail (particularly in "Michael Ellis").

No. overall	No. in series	Title	Original release date
40	1	"The Golden Age of Ballooning"	31 October 1974
The Montgolfier Brothers; Montgolfier Brothers in Love (Not with each other, obviously); Louis XVI; The Court of George III; Party Political Broadcast on Behalf of the Norwegian Party (subtitled); Zeppelin; The Golden Age of Colonic Irrigation; This is the third episode without a formal opening sequence. Almost the entire episode was written by Palin himself.
41	2	"Michael Ellis"	7 November 1974
Department Store; Buying an Ant – written by Cleese and Chapman; At Home with The Ant and Other Pets; Documentary on Ants; Ant Complaints; Ant Poetry Reading; Toupee Department; Different Endings; Note: This is the second episode to feature a full-length story (the other being "The Cycling Tour" from Series 3). It was mainly written by Cleese and Chapman with some help from Palin and Neil Innes. Note: The end credits appear immediately after the opening sequence.
42	3	"The Light Entertainment War"	14 November 1974
Up Your Pavement (the title and announcer call it "Up Your Sidewalk"); the theme music heard is a variant of "When Does A Dream Begin?" and based very much on the theme tune to Steptoe and Son, a popular BBC sitcom of the time. A little later in this sequence, the theme tune for Blue Peter can be heard very briefly. Douglas Adams, who previously wrote for the series, makes a brief appearance as a doctor treating a man suffering from lumbago during a small portion of this skit.: RAF Banter – written by Palin and Jones; sketch opens with Jones climbing out of a Hawker Hurricane Mk. I, L1592, now on display at the Science Museum, London.: Trivializing the War; Court-martial; Basingstoke in Westphalia; "Anything Goes" (song); Film Trailer; The Public Are Idiots; Programme Titles Conference; The Last Five Miles (8 km) of the M4; Woody and Tinny Words; Show-Jumping; features Olympic silver medal-winning showjumper Marion Mould (see also Stroller).: Newsflash with Peter Woods; "When Does a Dream Begin?" (song); written and performed by Neil Innes, singing to Maggie Weston, the Python make-up girl and future wife of Terry Gilliam. Note: The Nude Organist and the 'It's Man' appear for the last time, in footage taken from the episode with "Dennis Moore". Note: Most of the sketches of the episode have a shared theme (World War II) yet no apparent narrative.
43	4	"Hamlet"	21 November 1974
Bogus Psychiatrists; Nationwide; Police Helmets; Father-in-Law; Hamlet and Ophelia; Boxing Match Aftermath; Boxing Commentary; Piston Engine (A Bargain); A Room in Polonius's House; Dentists; Live from Epsom – Jockey Interviews; Queen Victoria Handicap; And Then...
44	5	"Mr. Neutron"	28 November 1974
Post-Box Ceremony; Mr. Neutron; F.E.A.R. / Mr. Neutron Is Missing!; Teddy Salad; Secretary of State and Prime Minister; Bombing; Mrs. Scum; Teddy Salad Explodes; Mr. Neutron Escapes; Conjuring Today; Note: This is the third episode to feature a full-length story ("The Cycling Tour" and "Michael Ellis" being the earlier two). Note: With the exception of "Post-Box Ceremony", nearly the entire episode was co-written by Palin and Jones.
45	6	"Party Political Broadcast"	5 December 1974
Most Awful Family in Britain – written by Chapman and Neil Innes; Icelandic Honey Week; Patient Abuse – written by Chapman and Douglas Adams; Brigadier and Bishop; Appeal on Behalf of Extremely Rich People – written by Chapman and Innes; The Man Who Finishes Other People's Sentences; David Attenborough; The Walking Trees of Dahomey; Batsmen of the Kalahari; Cricket Match (assegais); BBC News (handovers); Note: A sketch "Ursula Hitler" was intended to be included after the "BBC News (handovers)" sketch, but was cut from the episode. Note: As the episode opens and closes, there are announcements relating to the "Party Political Broadcast on Behalf of the Liberal Party".
