= Monty Python's Flying Circus (album) =

Live album by Monty Python
- Released: 6 November 1970 (UK); 1970 (US)
- Recorded: 2 May 1970 at Camden Theatre, London
- Genre: Comedy
- Length: 53:13
- Label: BBC (UK) Pye (US)
- Producer: Ian MacNaughton

Monty Python chronology
Monty Python's Flying Circus (1970)	Another Monty Python Record (1971)

Monty Python's Flying Circus is the first album produced by the Monty Python troupe, released in both the UK and US in 1970, with the US version featuring a back cover slightly different from the original UK version. It features newly recorded versions of sketches from the first Monty Python's Flying Circus television series.

Next to the television show itself, the album was the first piece of media the Pythons released. It is noted that Terry Gilliam was not included as a member of Python on the album's cast listing (in spite of his brief appearance in the sketch "The Visitors") and Graham Chapman's name is misspelled "Grahame".

The album was recorded on a single day, 2 May 1970, in front of a live audience at the Camden Theatre in London. Recalling the rather muted response, Eric Idle would later claim "they were a particularly dead audience."

The copyright to the record is still owned by the BBC, making it one of the few pieces of material the Pythons themselves do not own. This is also the reason why it did not gain a 2006 special edition release. One of the tracks makes specific mention to the album being in stereo, and Chapman demonstrates it by walking from one speaker to another. The effect was totally lost as the album was recorded in mono, which the Pythons did not know at the time. They felt disenchanted by the BBC's album-producing methods, and for their remaining albums sought very different approaches.

Professional ratings
Review scores
Source	Rating
AllMusic	4/5 stars

== Audiobook ==
The album has been available on CD as an audiobook since 1996. (It was first released as an audiobook in 1994 on cassette.)

In 2011, AudioGO Ltd. released a "Facsimile Edition," which is the only audiobook version with the original LP's artwork. Graham Chapman's name is spelled correctly on the cover of this edition.

In 2012, the album was packaged with two discs of Fawlty Towers under the title BBC Comedy Greats!.

In June 2014, the album was included as bonus content with the expanded re-release of Monty Python Sings (again) as a deluxe 2-CD set and digital download.

== Track listing ==
=== Side one ===
1. Flying Sheep
2. Television Interviews
3. Trade Description Act
4. Nudge Nudge
5. The Mouse Problem
6. Buying a Bed
7. Interesting People
8. The Barber
9. Interviews

=== Side two ===
1. More Television Interviews
2. Children's Stories
3. The Visitors
4. The Cinema
5. The North Minehead Bye-Election (sic)
6. Me, Doctor
7. Pet Shop
8. Self-Defence

=== BBC audiobook track listing ===
1. Flying Sheep
2. A Man with Three Buttocks
3. Crunchy Frog
4. Nudge Nudge Wink Wink
5. The Mouse Problem
6. Buying a Bed
7. Interesting People
8. Barber Shop Sketch
9. Lumberjack Song
10. Interview
11. Arthur Two Sheds
12. Children's Stories
13. Visitors
14. Albatross
15. Mr Hilter
16. The North Minehead By-Election
17. Me, Doctor
18. Dead Parrot Sketch
19. Self-Defence

== Personnel ==
- Graham Chapman
- John Cleese
- Terry Gilliam
- Eric Idle
- Terry Jones
- Michael Palin

=== Additional performers ===
- Carol Cleveland
- The Fred Tomlinson Singers

== Distribution information ==
- LP: (1970) BBC Records REB 73M (UK)
- CS: (1970) BBC Records REMC 73 (UK)
- LP: (1970) BBC Records 22073 (US)
- LP: (1975) Pye Records 12116 (US)
- CD: (1985) BBC/Audio Visual International BBCCD73 (UK)
- LP: (1986) Warner Brothers Records 88375 (ISBN 0-87188-375-9) (US)
- CS: (1994) BBC Enterprises, Ltd. ZBBC 1508 ISBN 0-563-39481-1 (UK) (Canned Laughter series)
- CD: (1996) BBC Audiobooks ISBN 0-563-55820-2 (UK)
- CD: (2006) BBC Audiobooks ISBN 978-0-563-55820-0 (UK)
- CD: (2011) AudioGO ISBN 978-1-4084-6820-3 (UK) (Vintage Beeb series. Facsimile Edition.)
- CD: (2012) AudioGO ISBN 1-60998-780-2 (UK) (BBC Comedy Greats! with Fawlty Towers.)
- LP: (2014) BBC Records MPYTHONLP1 (UK) (Boxset Monty Python's Total Rubbish)
