= Architects Sketch =

Monty Python sketch

The "Architects Sketch" is a Monty Python sketch, first seen in episode 17 of Monty Python's Flying Circus, "The Buzz Aldrin Show". The episode was recorded on 18 September 1970 and originally broadcast on 20 October 1970. The following year, an audio version was recorded for Another Monty Python Record.

== Description ==
The sketch is introduced by a group of Gumbies (on film) who shout "The Architects Sketch" until Mr. Tid (Graham Chapman) yells at them to shut up. They then repeat "Sorry!" until Mr. Tid throws a bucket of water on them from above.

The sketch proper begins (on videotape) with Tid in an office with two City gents (Michael Palin and Terry Jones). On a table near the window stand two architectural models of tower blocks. Mr. Tid informs the City gents that he has invited the architects responsible to explain the advantages of their respective designs.

First to arrive is Mr. Wiggin (John Cleese), who describes his architectural design and modern construction, and then explains his killing technique starting with a conveyor belt and "rotating knives". It turns out that Mr. Wiggin mainly designs slaughterhouses and has misunderstood the owners' attitude to their tenants. When Mr. Wiggin fails to persuade them to accept his "real beaut" of a design, he launches into an impassioned tirade against "you non-creative garbage" and blackballing Freemasons. When they still reject his design, however, he begs the increasingly uncomfortable City gents to accept him into the Freemasons.

Once Wiggin has been persuaded to leave, the second architect, Mr. Leavey (Eric Idle), arrives. As Mr. Leavey describes the strong construction and safety features of his design, a tall tower block, his model collapses and catches fire in the manner of the then recent Ronan Point disaster, accompanied by a large on-screen caption reading "SATIRE". The City gents assure Mr. Leavey that provided the tenants are "of light build and relatively sedentary" there should be no need to make expensive changes to the design. After his design is accepted, the model explodes. The City gents exchange bizarre Masonic handshakes with Leavey. Wiggin reappears at the doorway, breaking the fourth wall to tell the audience, "It opens doors, I'm telling you."

This leads into a filmed section about "How to Recognise a Mason", in which Masons are shown engaging in such bizarre behaviour as hopping down Threadneedle Street with their trousers around their ankles. Finally, there follows an animation in which an announcer attempts to "cure" a Mason (an animated cutout of Chapman) through behavioural therapy with a picture of a nude woman; when the subject says, "No", the enraged announcer crushes him with a giant hammer.
