= Monty Python's Big Red Book =

1971 book by Monty Python

- Cover of Monty Python's Big Red Book hardback, 1971.
- Editor: Eric Idle
- Authors: Graham Chapman; John Cleese; Eric Idle; Terry Jones; Michael Palin
- Illustrator: Terry Gilliam
- Language: English
- Genre: Humour
- Publisher: Methuen
- Publication date: 1 November 1971
- Publication place: United Kingdom
- English publication date: Print (hardcover)
- ISBN: 0-416-66890-9
- Followed by: The Brand New Monty Python Bok

Monty Python's Big Red Book is a humour book comprising mostly material derived and reworked from the first two series of the Monty Python's Flying Circus BBC television series. Edited by Eric Idle, it was first published in the UK in 1971 by Methuen Publishing Ltd. It was later published in the United States in 1975 by Warner Books.

As well as the comedy content, the title itself is a humorous reference to Mao Zedong's Little Red Book— despite the title, the book has a blue cover. To add to the confusion, the credits page refers to it as Monty Python's Big Brown Book.

The book contains some stills of footage shot for And Now For Something Completely Different but not used, including "Ken Shabby" and "Le Pouff Celebre/Flying Sheep".

Shortly after publication the book ran into trouble when a music publishing company objected to the use of their trade name being used on the "Bing Tiddle Tiddle Bong" sheet music. After the first 75,000 copies were sold, all subsequent editions removed the reference to "The Wright Ukulele Tutor" and replaced it with "The Volti Subito".

In 1972 a paperback edition was issued with the words "Special New Hardback Edition" replacing the "Very Urgent" sticker on the front cover. In 1981 both this book and The Brand New Monty Python Bok were reissued as a hardback book entitled The Complete Works Of Shakespeare And Monty Python: Volume One – Monty Python. Paperback editions of both these books were reissued again in 1986 as The Monty Python Gift Boks, sold together inside an outer cover which folded out into a mini poster.

The concept of a drabble is said to have originated in UK science fiction fandom in the 1980s; the 100-word format was established by the Birmingham University SF Society, taking a term from Monty Python's Big Red Book. In the book, "Drabble" was described as a word game where the first participant to write a novel was the winner. In order to make the game possible in the real world, it was agreed that 100 words would suffice. French writer Félix Fénéon may be considered as a precursor with his nouvelles en trois lignes (three lines short stories), inspired by new items.

In 2008 Monty Python's Big Red Book was referenced in the Doctor Who episode "Silence in the Library".

== Contents ==
- Forewords
- Advertisements
- Juliette – Ken Shabby & Rosemary, A True Love Story Of Our Times
- Credits
- Why Accountancy Is Not Boring
- Naughty Pages
- Join The Professionals
- The Silly Party
- Keyhole For voyeurs
- Batley Ladies Townswomen's Guild
- E.D. Silly's Page
- Spam
- Sports Page
- Arts Page
- Horace Poem
- The World Encyclopedia Of Carnal Knowledge
- Australia Page
- Children's Page
- Postal Blackmail
- A Song For Europe
- The Importance Of Being Earnest
- Are You Civilised?
- Le Pouff Celebre
- Madame Palm Writes
- The Family Tree Of Johann Gambolputty...
- The Greatest Upper Class Race In The World
- What To Look For In A Great Twit
- Lumberjack Song
- Do-It-Yourself Story
- Goat's Page
- Hello O.N.s Everywhere
- Whizzo Assortment
- English To Hungarian Phrasebook
- Johnson's Novelties
- How To Walk Silly
- Be A Modern Hermit
- The Poems Of Ewen McTeagle
- The Piranha Brothers
- Python Literary Guild
- Bibliography

== Credits ==
- Authors – Graham Chapman, John Cleese, Eric Idle, Terry Jones, Michael Palin
- Illustrator – Terry Gilliam
- Editor – Eric Idle
- Photography – Doug Webb, BBC News Picture Library, The Radio Times, Hulton Picture Library, John Horton, Tony Sullivan
- Art Director – Derek Birdsall
- Art Editor/Lay-out – Katy Hepburn
- Artwork – Roger Hudson, Stephen Scales
- Music Arranger – Fred Tomlinson
