= Whither Canada? =

Whither Canada? may refer to:

- Whither Canada?, a proposed title for Monty Python's Flying Circus
- "Whither Canada?", the debut episode of Monty Python's Flying Circus
