= The Brand New Monty Python Bok =

1973 Comedy Book By Monty Python

- Cover of The Brand New Monty Python Bok hardback, 1973.
- Editor: Eric Idle
- Authors: Graham Chapman; John Cleese; Terry Gilliam; Eric Idle; Terry Jones; Michael Palin
- Illustrator: Terry Gilliam; Peter Brookes
- Language: English
- Genre: Humour
- Publisher: Methuen
- Publication date: 1 November 1973
- Publication place: United Kingdom
- English publication date: Print (hardcover)
- ISBN: 0-413-30130-3
- Preceded by: Monty Python's Big Red Book
- Followed by: Monty Python and the Holy Grail (Book)

The Brand New Monty Python Bok was the second book to be published by the British comedy troupe Monty Python. Edited by Eric Idle, it was published by Methuen Books in 1973 and contained more print-style comic pieces than their first effort, Monty Python's Big Red Book.

The white dust jacket was printed with some realistic looking smudged fingerprints on the front, leading to several complaints and returned copies from booksellers. These complaints paled in comparison to the fuss created about the cover printed on the actual book. The title of the fake cover was Tits 'n Bums, appearing as a pornographic magazine with a background photo of several intertwined naked women, but purporting to be a church magazine with articles such as "Are you still a verger?", and a 'weekly look at church architecture'. As Michael Palin remembered: "Our publisher Geoffrey Strachan told the story of an elderly lady bookseller from Newbury who refused to believe the fingerprints were put there deliberately. 'In that case I shall sell the books without their jackets', she said and slammed the phone down so quickly that Geoffrey was unable to warn her that beneath each dust-cover was a mock soft-core magazine".

The book contained an amalgamation of print-style pieces and material derived from Flying Circus sketches. Examples of the former include an interconnected series of jokes based on figures of speech and an advertisement for the fictional Welsh martial art of Llap Goch, which claims to be able to teach students how to grow taller, stronger, faster, and more deadly in a matter of days. Examples of the latter include Sam Peckinpah's "Salad Days" and the Travel Agent sketch, a collection of stereotypes about annoying tourists and the perils of inter-country air travel.

In 1974 a paperback edition was issued as The Brand New Monty Python Papperbok, containing the same contents minus the Tits 'n Bums book cover. In 1981 both this book and Monty Python's Big Red Book were reissued as a hardback book entitled The Complete Works Of Shakespeare And Monty Python: Volume One - Monty Python. Paperback editions of both these books were reissued again in 1986 as The Monty Python Gift Boks, sold together inside an outer cover which folded out into a mini poster.

== Contents ==
=== Covers ===
- Tits 'n Bums: A Weekly Look at Church Architecture (Front cover, under dust jacket)
- What People Have Said About The Brand New Monty Python Bok / What Other People Have Said About The Brand New Monty Python Bok (Inside front flap)
- The Author's Friend by Michael Palin, Age 8 (Inside back flap)

=== Inside ===
- Ferdean School Library Check-out History
- Safety Instructions
- The Old Story Teller
- Biggles
- Page 6: Film Rights Still Available
- Llap-Goch Advertisement
- Edward Woodward's Fish Page
- The Python Book of Etiquette
- Famous First Drafts
- Advertisements / My Garden Poem
- A Puzzle
- The Bigot Newsletter
- The London Casebook of Detective René Descartes
- Wallpapers
- 16 Magazine
- Summer Madness
- Masturbation: The Difficult One
- Coming Soon: Page 71!
- Python Panel
- The Adventures of Walter the Wallabee
- Mr. April (I've Got Two Legs)
- Competition Time
- World Record Attempt
- World Record Results / Invitations
- The Oxfod Simplified Dictionary
- Drawing Hands
- Film Review: Sam Peckinpah's "Salad Days"
- Rat Recipes
- Rat Menu
- Overland to the World
- This Page is in Colour
- Contents
- African Notebook: "A Lucky Escape"
- How To...
- Only 15 Pages to Page 71
- Norman Henderson's Diary (Insert)
- Sex-Craft (Insert)
- How to Take Your Appendix Out on the Piccadilly Line
- Join the Dots
- Directory
- The British Apathy League
- Let's Talk About Bottoms
- Advertisements / Hobbies
- Page 71
- Reviews of Page 71
- Through the Looking Glass
- The Hackenthorpe Book of Lies
- Fairy Tale
- Ferndean School Report
- The Stratton Indicator
- Play Cheese Shop
- The Official Medallic Commemoration of the History of Mankind
- Anagrams
- Your Stars
- Hamsters: A Warning
- Teach Yourself Surgery

== Credits ==
- Authors - Graham Chapman, John Cleese, Terry Gilliam, Eric Idle, Terry Jones, Michael Palin
- Additional material - Connie Booth
- Illustrator - Terry Gilliam
- Additional illustration - Peter Brookes
- Editor - Eric Idle
- Design/Graphics - Kate Hepburn, Lucinda Cowell
- Photography - Roger Perry, Roger Last, Reinholdt Binder
- Additional photography - Camera Press, Hulton Picture Library, Barnaby Picture Library, The Mansell Collection, Graphic House Inc.
