= Arthur Wilson =

Arthur, Art, or Artie Wilson may refer to:

== Sport ==
- Art Wilson (1885–1960), baseball catcher
- Arthur Wilson (rugby union) (1886–1917), British rugby union player and Olympic medalist
- Arthur Wilson (gynaecologist) (1888–1947), Australian gynaecologist, obstetrician and Australian rules footballer
- Andy Wilson (cricketer) (Arthur Wilson, 1910–2002), English cricketer
- Keith Wilson (cricketer) (Arthur Wilson, 1894–1977), English cricketer
- Arthur Wilson (English footballer) (1908–2000), Southampton, West Ham United and Chester footballer
- Arthur James Wilson (1858–1945), English cyclist and journalist
- Artie Wilson (1920–2010), American baseball player
- Arthur Wilson (administrator) (died 2021), Australian administrator and historian associated with the Fitzroy Football Club

== Military ==
- Sir Arthur Wilson, 3rd Baronet (1842–1921), British Royal Navy officer
- Arthur H. Wilson (1881–1953), Philippine-American War Medal of Honor recipient
- Arthur R. Wilson (1894–1956), American general in WW2
- Arthur Gillespie Wilson (1897–1982), Australian Army officer

== Other ==
- Sergeant Arthur Wilson, character from the British television sitcom Dad's Army
- Arthur Wilson (writer) (1595–1652), English writer
- Arthur Wilson (shipping magnate) (1836–1909), English ship-owner from Hull
- Arthur Wilson (judge) (1837–1915), English judge
- Stanley Wilson (British politician) (Arthur Stanley Wilson, 1868–1938), member of parliament for Holderness
- Arthur Wilson (Western Australian politician) (1869–1948), Western Australian politician
- Arthur McCandless Wilson (1902–1979), American professor of biography
- Arthur Wilson (crystallographer) (1914–1995), Canadian crystallographer (Cambridge and Birmingham)
- Arthur A. Wilson (born 1968), Indian cinematographer
- Arthur Wilson 1, mountaineer on the 1969 British Kilimanjaro Expedition
- Arthur Wilson 2, mountaineer on the 1969 British Kilimanjaro Expedition
