= The Colonel (Monty Python) =

Character from Monty Python's Flying Circus

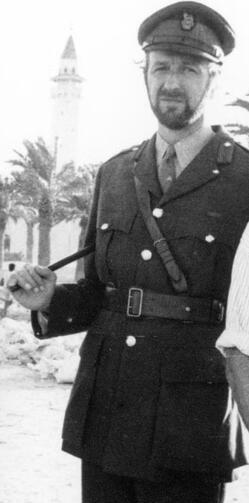
- Graham Chapman in character as The Colonel
- First appearance: Monty Python's Flying Circus; 1969
- Last appearance: Monty Python Live at the Hollywood Bowl 1982
- Portrayed by: Graham Chapman

In-universe information
- Gender: Male
- Occupation: Army colonel
- Affiliation: British Army
- Nationality: British

The Colonel is a recurring fictional character from the British television series Monty Python's Flying Circus, played by Graham Chapman. He acts as a "straight man", staying serious despite the absurdity of the show, often stopping the sketches to denounce them for being "too silly" and demanding something else to be shown.

== Character ==
The Colonel acts as a "straight man" comic foil to the show's absurd characters and sketches. He maintains a rigidly mirthless personality and is always dressed in British Army No. 2 Dress uniform. He occasionally makes appearances in the show, usually breaking the fourth wall and disrupting sketches to pronounce them too silly for the public and, therefore, demanding that something else be shown. He often orders the show to proceed in a different direction (sometimes to the unshown director) and frequently makes offhanded insults to men with long hair.

The Colonel's role in stopping or redirecting sketches has been discussed as an example of a character breaking the fourth wall of theatrical production, challenging the "fictional credibility" of the presentation, and has been compared to the work of Luigi Pirandello.

== Main appearances ==
The Colonel appeared first in the pilot episode, "Whither Canada?" in a documentary-formatted sketch, to help describe the Allied Forces involvement in joke warfare during World War II.

He appears four times in "Owl-Stretching Time", protesting rip-offs of the British army's slogan, "It's a Man's Life in the Modern Army."

The Colonel appears most frequently in "Full Frontal Nudity". In this episode, the Colonel is writing in his office when he is suddenly approached by Private Watkins (played by Eric Idle), a young soldier who has been in the army for one day, claiming he wants to leave because "it's dangerous". They are interrupted by the entrance of two gangsters, Dino and Luigi Vercotti, who attempt an outrageously obvious protection racket, hoping to extort money from the Colonel in exchange for agreeing to protect his army. After a brief dialogue between the gangsters and the humourless Colonel, the latter stands up, exclaiming that the whole premise is too silly. He addresses the unseen director of the sketch and begins to take over the show. He claims that he has not been given a single funny line and demands to have the camera zoom in on his face. Looking straight into the camera, the Colonel orders that the show proceed to an animated segment.

Later on, the Colonel again stops the episode to announce "Now, I’ve noticed a tendency for this programme to get rather silly". After a brief speech of condemnation, he lets the show move on to an outdoor hermit sketch. He then interrupts this sketch in the middle of a scene, forcing the actors and, in fact, the entire filming crew to desert the set.

He later interrupts the famous Dead Parrot sketch; after Mr Praline calls the situation too silly, the Colonel bursts in on the scene, expressing his agreement and demanding that the show "Get on with it!”

The Colonel lastly appears in this episode during the documentary sketch about "Hell’s Grannies", when a vicar (Eric Idle) is attacked by a "vicious gang of keep-left signs". The Colonel effectively ends the episode, by staring straight into the camera and saying "Now for a complete change of mood".

== Other appearances ==
The Colonel has made appearances in And Now for Something Completely Different (1971), Monty Python Live at the Hollywood Bowl (1982), at Pink Floyd's 1975 concert at Knebworth, UK, and in a May 1982 episode of Saturday Night Live where Chapman, as The Colonel, interrupts a sketch that he accuses of being "ripped off of Monty Python." Later in the same episode, Chapman appeared on the show's Weekend Update segment to comment on [and mock] NBC's earlier refusal to air a commercial featuring Chapman as the Colonel for the Amnesty International benefit The Secret Policeman's Other Ball.

Archive footage of the Colonel was used in Monty Python Live (Mostly) for 2014.

The surviving members of Monty Python sent a "boot-shaped floral arrangement" to Graham Chapman's funeral, which included the phrase "stop us if we're all getting too silly", in recognition of his role as The Colonel.

== See also ==
- List of recurring Monty Python's Flying Circus characters
