= Seduced Milkmen =

Monty Python sketch

Seduced Milkmen is a sketch written and performed by Monty Python, portraying female sexuality as a trap. The sketch is wordless and just one minute long, but was well received.

It first appeared in the third episode of Monty Python's Flying Circus, "How to Recognise Different Types of Trees From Quite a Long Way Away", on BBC1 on 19 October 1969. Filming took place in Ullswater Road in Barnes, London.

The sketch also appeared in the first Python film, And Now For Something Completely Different, in which it segues into "The Funniest Joke in the World" (this sketch being presented as one of the joke-writer's rejected ideas).

The romantic background music in the original television version is "Charmaine" by Mantovani & His Orchestra, while the film version uses the "Liebestod" from Richard Wagner's Tristan und Isolde.

== Synopsis ==
The sketch starts with a milkman (Michael Palin) delivering milk to a suburban house. The door opens and a seductive woman (Thelma Taylor in the television version, Carol Cleveland in the film version) steps out and lures the milkman in; the milkman looks around, then enters the house. The woman takes the milkman upstairs, smiling at him and beckoning him with her finger. The milkman cautiously follows her as she unlocks her bedroom door. She opens the door and ushers the milkman inside. As the milkman enters the room, she shuts the door and locks it. The milkman looks around the room and sees several milkmen, some of whom are very old, including two who are skeletons. Ralph Woodward points out that the plot bears a strong resemblance to that of the poem "La Belle Dame sans Merci" by John Keats.

== Reception ==
The sketch was described by Susan Dunne of the Hartford Courant as "one of the funniest things Python ever did".
