= The Spanish Inquisition (Monty Python) =

Series of Monty Python sketches

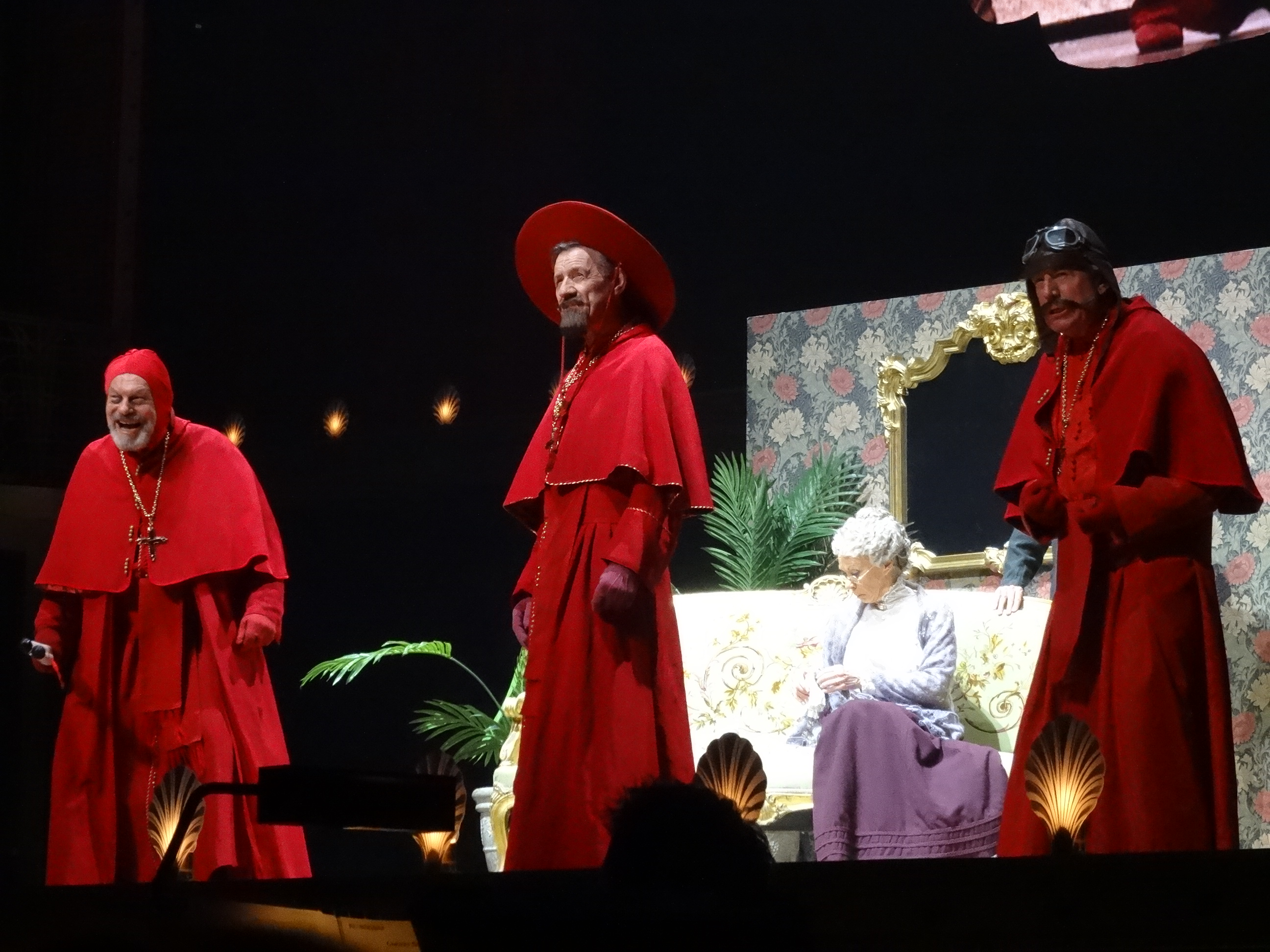
Terry Gilliam, Michael Palin and Terry Jones playing "The Spanish Inquisition" in Monty Python Live (Mostly), London, 2014

"The Spanish Inquisition" is an episode and recurring segment in the British sketch comedy TV series Monty Python's Flying Circus, specifically series 2 episode 2 (first broadcast 22 September 1970), that satirises the Spanish Inquisition. The sketches are notable for the catchphrase, "Nobody expects the Spanish Inquisition!", which has been frequently quoted and become an Internet meme. The final instance of the catchphrase in the episode uses the musical composition "Devil's Galop" by Charles Williams. Rewritten audio versions of the sketches were included on Another Monty Python Record in 1971.

== Plot synopsis ==
This recurring sketch is predicated on a seemingly unrelated narrative bit in which someone exclaims that they "didn't expect a Spanish Inquisition!", often in irritation at being vigorously questioned by another. The first appearance of Monty Python's "Spanish Inquisition" characters occurs in a drawing room set in "Jarrow, 1912", with a title card featuring a modern British urban area with a nuclear power plant. A mill worker (Graham Chapman) enters the room and tells a woman sitting on a couch knitting (Carol Cleveland) in a thick accent that "one of the cross beams has gone out askew on the treadle". When Cleveland says that she cannot understand what he's talking about, Chapman repeats the line without the thick accent. The woman says, "Well, what on earth does that mean?" Chapman becomes defensive and says, "I didn't expect a kind of Spanish Inquisition!" Suddenly, the Inquisition—consisting of Cardinal Ximénez (Michael Palin) and his assistants, Cardinal Biggles (Terry Jones) (who resembles his namesake Biggles wearing a leather aviator's helmet and goggles) and Cardinal Fang (Terry Gilliam)—bursts into the room to the sound of a jarring musical sting. Ximénez shouts, with a particular and high-pitched emphasis on the first word: "No-body expects the Spanish Inquisition!".

After entering, Ximénez begins enumerating their weapons, but interrupts himself as he keeps forgetting to mention additional weapons and has to begin numbering his list over again. After several attempts, Ximénez states that he will come in again and herds the Inquisition back off the set. The straight man mill worker repeats the cue line, the Inquisition bursts back in (complete with jarring chord), and the introduction is tried anew. But Ximénez fails again and tries to get Cardinal Biggles to do the introduction, but Biggles is also unsuccessful.

Ximénez decides to forget the introduction and has Cardinal Fang read out charges of heresy against Cleveland, who pleads "innocent", and the cardinals respond with "diabolical laughter" and threats. Ximénez intends to torture the woman with "the rack", but Cardinal Biggles instead produces a dish-drying rack. This rack is tied to Cleveland and Biggles pretends to turn a lever, but it has no effect whatsoever. As they work, Chapman answers the door to find a BBC employee (John Cleese) requesting him to open a door for a gag on "the neighboring sketch", leading into the "Jokes and Novelties Salesman" segment.

The Inquisition returns in a later sketch as an older woman (Marjorie Wilde) shares photographs from a scrapbook with another woman (Cleveland), who rips them up as they are handed to her. When the older woman presents a photo of the Spanish Inquisition hiding behind the coal shed, Cleveland says, "I didn't expect the Spanish Inquisition!" The three cardinals then reappear and take the older woman away to a dungeon.

Biggles tries to torture the woman by poking her repeatedly with soft cushions. When this fails, Ximénez orders Fang to get "the comfy chair", which is brought out and the woman placed in it. Ximénez states that she must stay in the chair "until lunch time with only a cup of coffee at 11", and begins to shout at her to confess—only to have Biggles break down and confess. This frustrates Ximénez, but he cannot complain about it since he is distracted by a cartoon character from the next scene.

At the end of the show, in the "Court Charades" sketch, a judge (Jones) who is also a defendant in an obscenity trial at the Old Bailey is casually sentenced by another judge (Chapman) to be burned at the stake. The convicted judge responds, "Blimey, I didn't expect the Spanish Inquisition!" The whole court rises and looks expectantly at the witness entrance door. As the closing credits of the episode begin, the Inquisitors race out of a house and hop on a double-decker bus to the Old Bailey, all to the tune of "Devil's Galop". As the Inquisitors ride in the bus, they comment worriedly that they are running out of credits and are panicked that the episode will soon end. The bus reaches the courthouse and the cardinals charge up the steps of the Old Bailey. They finally burst into the courtroom and Ximénez begins to shout, "NO-body expects the Span...," but a black title card with the words, "THE END", interrupts him. In resignation, he says, "Oh, bugger", and the episode concludes.

In the Monty Python Live (Mostly) stage show, the sketch ends when Ximénez orders Biggles to "torture" the victim (who is sitting in the comfy chair) by giving her a glass of cold milk from the fridge. When Biggles opens the door, the Man in the Fridge (Eric Idle) emerges and begins singing the "Galaxy Song" to the victim, while the Inquisition exit through the fridge.

== Related sketches ==
Cardinal Ximénez briefly appears two episodes later ("The Buzz Aldrin Show") in a vox pop, again displaying difficulty counting (in this instance, the kinds of aftershave he uses). Later in that episode during the "Police Constable Pan Am Sketch", the policeman tells a chemist "one more peep out of you and I'll do you for heresy", with the chemist (played by Palin) responding that he "didn't expect the Spanish Inquisition"; PC Pan Am (played by Graham Chapman) tells the chemist to shut up.
