= How Not to Be Seen =

Monty Python sketch

"How Not to Be Seen" is a popular sketch from Monty Python's Flying Circus. The sketch purports to be a British government public information film in which a disembodied narrator, voiced by John Cleese, instructs viewers on "how not to be seen."

== Plot ==
The film starts with a serene wide shot of a landscape in which there are supposedly 40 people, none of whom can be seen. The picture then changes to another serene wide shot of a different landscape. In it is Mr. E. R. Bradshaw of Napier Court, Black Lion Road, (London) SE 5, who cannot be seen. The narrator asks him to stand up. He complies and is immediately shot. According to the narrator, "This demonstrates the value of not being seen."

There is a cut to another landscape wide shot. In it, the audience cannot see Mrs. B. J. Smegma of 13, The Crescent, Belmont. The narrator asks her to stand up. She also complies and is immediately shot.

Next is a shot of a clearing near a wood with only one bush in the middle of the frame. Somewhere in the vicinity is Mr. Nesbitt of Harlow, New Town. He is asked to stand up, but in contrast to the previous people, he does not comply. The narrator explains that "Mr. Nesbitt has learned the first lesson of not being seen: not to stand up. However, he has chosen a very obvious piece of cover." The bush then suddenly explodes.

Following this, we cut to another clearing with three bushes in the frame. Hiding nearby is Mr. E.V. Lambert of Homeleigh, The Burrows, Oswestry, who has presented the narrator with a poser by choosing a very clever way of not being seen. Although "we do not know which bush he is behind, [...] we can soon find out": The left bush explodes, then the right one, and finally the middle; mixed with the noise of this explosion comes the scream of Mr. Lambert. "Yes, it was the middle one," the Narrator intones.

Next is a farmland area with a water barrel, a wall, a pile of leaves, a bushy tree, a parked car, and many bushes in the distance. In this shot, Mr. Ken Andrews of Leighton Road, Slough "has concealed himself extremely well. He could be almost anywhere. He could be behind the wall, inside the water barrel, beneath a pile of leaves, up in the tree, squatting down behind the car, concealed in a hollow, or crouched behind any one of a hundred bushes." However, thanks to the narrator, "we happen to know he's in the water barrel." The water barrel then explodes.

There is then a panning shot across a line of beach huts along the sea while the narrator explains that Mr. and Mrs. Watson of Ivy Cottage, Worplesdon Road, Hull have chosen a very cunning way of not being seen. "When we called at their house, we found that they had gone away on two weeks' holiday. They had not left any forwarding address and they had bolted and barred the house to prevent us getting in. However, a neighbour told us where they were", as the camera pans to spot a singled-out hut in the middle of the beach. The hut containing the Watsons explodes, accompanied by the couple's screams. The camera cuts to a Gumby-looking fellow identified as the neighbour who told the filmmakers where the Watsons were. He explodes and his boots are the only remains. "Nobody likes a clever dick," explains the narrator.

The film cuts to a shack ("And this is where he lived"), which also blows up, then changes to another shack ("And this is where Lord Langdon lived—‌who refused to speak to us"), which blows up as well. The picture goes on to various changes of houses ("So did the gentleman who lived here, and here, and, of course, here"), which each blow up, and then a series of atomic explosions ("Manchester, and the West Midlands, Spain, China!"). The narrator bursts into diabolical laughter and the sketch segues into a presenter (Michael Palin) stopping the film due to it becoming too distressing for certain viewers (though not to him).

After a short piece about a man who rode a tricycle across the Atlantic Ocean who couldn’t be interviewed as he had gone to the wrong studio, he interviews football player Ludovic Grayson, "the man who scored all six goals in Arsenal's 1-0 victory over the Turkish Champions FC Botty" (Terry Jones), who is hiding in a filing cabinet to protect himself from being seen. However, when the presenter notices that Grayson can still be heard, the latter is killed in the resulting explosion. The presenter then introduces "Jackie Charlton and the Tonettes", where they perform "Yummy, Yummy, Yummy" by Ohio Express while hiding inside shipping crates.

== Performances ==
"How Not to Be Seen" was first broadcast as the 11th episode of the show's second series (episode 24) on 8 December 1970. The sketch was reproduced in And Now For Something Completely Different with some alterations: there are 47 people stated to be in the first shot (rather than 40), Mr. E. V. Lambert was renamed Mr. E. W. Lambert, the farmland scene isn't shown, the beach hut scene is replaced with a tent in the woods and shortened, and the explosions of Lord Langdon's and others' houses are not shown. The segment ends with the narrator saying, "And this is where he lived. And this is where he was born," while the neighbour's house and birthplace are destroyed. The camera then zooms in on Cleese at a desk, laughing maniacally. He proceeds to say, with a serious face, "And now for something completely different" and immediately explodes, segueing into the opening credits.

== Cultural references ==
"How Not to Be Seen" is regarded as one of Monty Python's signature routines, with the "growing menace" of the "bodiless authoritarian figure" lending it the air of "the leisure activity of a lunatic god." Its format has been occasionally parodied, most prominently in a 2005 YouTube Machinima using graphics from the game Battlefield 2.

German artist Hito Steyerl referenced the sketch in the title of her 2013 work How Not to Be Seen: A Fucking Didactic Educational .MOV File, which presents ironic and humorous lessons on avoiding capture by digital technology.
