= Another Monty Python Record =

Studio album by Monty Python
- Released: 8 October 1971 (UK); 21 August 1972 (US)
- Recorded: 20–24 June 1971 at Marquee Studios, London
- Genre: Comedy
- Length: 45:45 (UK) 54:39 (US)
- Label: Charisma (UK) Buddah (US)
- Producers: Terry Jones; Michael Palin

Monty Python chronology
Monty Python's Flying Circus (1970)	Another Monty Python Record (1971)	Monty Python's Previous Record (1972)

Professional ratings
Review scores
Source	Rating
AllMusic	4/5 stars
Newsday	C+

Another Monty Python Record is the second album produced by the Monty Python comedy group, released in 1971. Dissatisfied with their monaural BBC debut album released the previous year, the group took full control of the follow-up, which would be the first release of a six-album deal with Charisma Records in the UK. Most of the material is from the second BBC series of Monty Python's Flying Circus, with a few newly written pieces. One track, "Stake Your Claim", is an English-language version of a sketch from the team's first German episode.

== Background ==
The production, with its innovative use of stereo and sound effects, was handled by Terry Jones and Michael Palin and proved a technical challenge. According to Jones: "We had this horrendous time because we were recording in this rather hippy recording studio. We were very keen to use the stereo and everything, but what we hadn't realised was that the guy who was doing the recording, who I think was out of his head most of the time, had not been making any notes. We'd end up with tapes and tapes of material with no idea of where anything was on the tapes. That was a bitter experience."

The sleeve was designed by Terry Gilliam, from an idea by Terry Jones. Packaged as a classical music recording (Beethoven's "Symphony No. 2 in D Major", with Peter Bruegel's The Census at Bethlehem), the cover was defaced by the Pythons to serve as their own record jacket. The "serious" liner notes on the back also bear a Pythonesque stamp: the biography of Beethoven quickly turns into a commentary on Beethoven's Wimbledon tennis debut. Included with the original vinyl LP were three card inserts printed with detailed instructions, scripts and cutout props for the "Be a Great Actor" sketch on side 2.

Due to the limitations of the vinyl format, the original 1971 UK release had many sketches edited down while others, such as "Communist Quiz" and "Penguin on the TV", were omitted altogether, causing a re-sequencing of the "Royal Festival Hall Concert" and "Spam" sketches. This truncated version was used for all UK cassette releases until 1994. When the album was released in the US in 1972 to coincide with the US release of And Now for Something Completely Different, the full unedited version was used. This longer edit was used for all CD releases in both the UK and US.

In addition to featuring a pared down track list, the original UK vinyl enjoyed two subtly different releases. Initial pressings were issued on the pink "famous Charisma label" (erroneously listing the release year as 1970) with subsequent pressings replacing this with the "Mad Hatter" label design (correcting the year to 1971). Both editions featured a trick continuous runout groove at the end of Side 1, where the sound of a record scratch is followed by Michael Palin's exclamation of "Sorry, squire! I scratched the record" repeated ad infinitum in the locked groove. This groove is further away from the label than where a locked groove would normally be, so that turntables with automatic return don't ruin this gimmick.

The album marked the group's first chart success, reaching No. 26 in the UK Albums Chart.

A 7" single, the Pythons' first, combining Spam Song/The Concert (CB.192) was issued in the UK on 8 September 1972, nearly a year after the album's release. Later pressings were issued in a picture sleeve featuring a still from the "Dirty Fork" sketch from And Now for Something Completely Different.

The 2006 CD reissue features four bonus tracks, although these date from the 1980 Contractual Obligation Album sessions.

The 2014 LP reissue by Virgin Records (both as a single disc and as part of the Monty Python's Total Rubbish boxset) contains the longer US version.

== Track listing: Original UK vinyl and cassette version ==
=== Side one ===
1. Introductions
2. Spanish Inquisition (Part 1)
3. Gumby Cherry Orchard
4. Contradiction
5. Architect's Sketch
6. Spanish Inquisition (Part 2)
7. Royal Festival Hall Concert
8. Ethel the Frog

=== Side two ===
1. Death of Mary, Queen of Scots
2. Spam
3. Spanish Inquisition (Part 3)
4. Comfy Chair
5. Famous Person Quiz
6. Be a Great Actor
7. Neville Shunt
8. Camp Judges
9. Stake Your Claim
10. Cannibalism
11. Camp Judges (Part 2)
12. Undertaker
13. Spanish Inquisition (Part 4)

== Track listing: US version, worldwide CD version ==
=== Side one ===
1. Introductions
2. Spanish Inquisition (Part 1)
3. Communist Quiz
4. Gumby Cherry Orchard
5. Contradiction
6. Architect's Sketch
7. Spanish Inquisition (Part 2)
8. Ethel the Frog

=== Side two ===
1. Death of Mary, Queen of Scots
2. Penguin on the TV
3. Spanish Inquisition (Part 3)
4. Comfy Chair
5. Famous Person Quiz
6. Be a Great Actor
7. Neville Shunt
8. Royal Festival Hall Concert
9. Spam
10. Camp Judges
11. Stake Your Claim
12. Cannibalism
13. Camp Judges (Part 2)
14. Undertaker
15. Spanish Inquisition (Part 4)

=== 2006 CD bonus tracks ===
1. Treadmill Lager
2. Bishop at Home
3. Courtroom Sketch
4. Freelance Undertaker

== Personnel ==
- Graham Chapman
- John Cleese
- Terry Gilliam
- Eric Idle
- Terry Jones
- Michael Palin

=== Additional performers ===
- Carol Cleveland
- The Fred Tomlinson Singers

== Music credits ==
The following is the list of musical works included on the album. They comprise a mixture of De Wolfe library music, self-penned Python songs and specially composed music by Fred Tomlinson.

1. Trondheim Hammer Dance (Fred Tomlinson)
2. Liberty Bell (John Philip Sousa, arr. A.W. Sheriff)
3. Fanfare Opening (D. Laren)
4. Formal Presentation (K. Papworth)
5. Contesana Padawana (Pyotr Ilyich Tchaikovsky)
6. Man of Power (J. Trombey)
7. Gold Lame (K. Papworth)
8. Southern Breeze (A. Mawer)
9. Spam Song (Terry Jones, Michael Palin & Fred Tomlinson)
10. Bahama Parakeet (A. Mawer)
11. House of Fashion (Stanley Black)
12. Circus Tumble (K. Papworth)
13. Fanfare A (Major J Howe)
14. Mystery Drums (P. Knight)
15. Mystery Place (P. Knight)
16. Ode to Edward (J. Trombey)
17. In Step With Johann (R. Wale)
18. Knees Up Mother Brown (Harris Weston & Bert Lee)

== Distribution information ==
- LP: (1971) Charisma CAS 1049 (UK)
- Cassette: (1971) Charisma ZCCAS 1049 (UK)
- LP: (1972) Charisma CAS 1049 (US, distributed by Buddah) (with different running-order and material)
- LP: (1972) Philips 6369 913 (Aust) (with different running-order and material)
- LP: (1975) Charisma CAS 1049 (UK, distributed by Phonogram)
- Cassette: (1975) Charisma CASMC 1049 (UK, distributed by Phonogram)
- LP: (1988) Charisma CHC 79 (UK, distributed by Virgin) (budget price)
- CD: (1989) Charisma CASCD 1049 ("Another Monty Python CD") (UK, distributed by Virgin)
- LP: (19**) Virgin MP501 (UK)
- CD: (1994) Virgin VCCD 001 (UK) ("Another Monty Python CD" version 2, re-issue)
- LP: (2014) Virgin Records MPYTHONLP2 (UK, US version of album) (Boxset Monty Python's Total Rubbish)
