= Lifeboat sketch =

Monty Python sketch

Monty Python's Lifeboat (Cannibalism) sketch appeared on Monty Python's Flying Circus in Episode 26. It was also performed on the album Another Monty Python Record, retitled "Still No Sign Of Land". The sketch was inspired by the famous 1884 English criminal law case of R v Dudley and Stephens, which involved survival cannibalism among castaways after a shipwreck.

The sketch features five sailors in a lifeboat, and features several resets where the characters mess up their lines and the whole sketch has to be restarted. The characters, trapped on the lifeboat and starving, decide to resort to cannibalism.

The Captain volunteers himself as victim, but is snubbed by two sailors, who are put off by the Captain's "gammy leg" and who would rather eat the flattered Johnson. All the sailors then begin bickering about who should be eaten first, on the grounds of who's too lean, not kosher, etc.

The argument ends with the planned menu: "Look. I tell you what. Those who want to can eat Johnson. And you, sir, can have my leg. And we make some stock from the Captain, and then we'll have Johnson cold for supper." As a nice addition to the meal, they then conjure up avocados and canned peaches, and call a waitress to their boat to take their order, followed by the studio audience booing.

The sketch is followed by the announcer reading a letter to the editor saying:

Dear Sir,
I am glad to hear that your studio audience disapproves of the last skit as strongly as I. As a naval officer I abhor the implication that the Royal Navy is a haven for cannibalism. It is well known that we now have the problem relatively under control, and that it is the R.A.F. who now suffer the largest casualties in this area.
And what do you think the Argylls ate in Aden? Arabs?
Yours etc.,
Captain B. J. Smethwick in a white wine sauce with shallots, mushrooms and garlic

The letter is followed by a highly cannibalistic Terry Gilliam animated cartoon, a brief plea for decency from Terry Jones in a false moustache, and finally the "Undertakers sketch", which is also about cannibalism.
