= Devil's Galop =

Light music composed by Charles Williams

"Devil's Galop" is a piece of light music composed by Charles Williams. It became famous as the theme tune to the radio serial Dick Barton – Special Agent. The word "galop" in the title refers to the galop dance (which, in turn, refers to a horse's gallop).

== In popular culture ==
It has since been used in a number of productions, often to give a sense of dramatic urgency to a chase scene. As well as being the theme for the BBC Light Programme's serial Dick Barton and its 1979 Southern Television revival, its other appearances include Dad's Army, Danger Mouse, The Goodies, and the Goon Show (the original theme music for which is called "Goons Gallop" and is reminiscent of "Devil's Galop"). Monty Python's Flying Circus used this theme throughout its run on television, including in the famous "The Spanish Inquisition" sketch.

Excerpts from the piece form part of the opening theme to the video game Monty on the Run.

The music has featured more recently in Mitchell and Webb's "The Surprising Adventures of Sir Digby Chicken Caesar" sketches, and the 30 Rock episode "Tracy Does Conan". It was also used in the CITV children's show ZZZap! and was the theme tune of the character Tricky Dicky.
