= Kilimanjaro Expedition =

Monty Python sketch

Kilimanjaro Expedition is a sketch from the episode of Monty Python's Flying Circus "The Ant, an Introduction", also appearing in the Monty Python film And Now For Something Completely Different. It has been compared to a comic episode in Franz Kafka's The Castle in which the protagonist, K., is confused by twins assigned to assist him.

== Overview ==
Arthur Wilson (Eric Idle), a young mountaineer, visits the office of Sir George Head, OBE (John Cleese), who is leading an expedition to Mount Kilimanjaro to find last year’s expedition who were to build a bridge between the "two peaks". Head suffers severely from diplopia, and believes throughout the sketch that there are two of everything, including Wilson and Mount Kilimanjaro, “a pretty tricky climb; most of it’s Up, till you reach the very, Very Top, and then it tends to slope away rather sharply”.

A guide, Jimmy Blankinsop (Graham Chapman) enters partway through and acts out the expedition route very physically, knocking over furniture in the process. Wilson leaves, feeling he has "absolutely no confidence in anyone involved in it", but the "other" Wilson (now visible) says "Well, I'm game, Sir". The camera then reveals two George Heads expressing delight at Wilson’s response. The gag concludes with two identical announcers (Cleese) introducing "a man with a tape recorder up his brother's nose".
