= Dirty Hungarian Phrasebook =

Monty Python sketch

"Dirty Hungarian Phrasebook" is a Monty Python sketch. It first aired in 1970 on Monty Python's Flying Circus as part of Episode 25, and also appears in the film And Now for Something Completely Different. Atlas Obscura has noted that it may have been inspired by English as She Is Spoke, a 19th-century Portuguese–English phrase book regarded as a classic source of unintentional humour, as the given English translations are generally completely incoherent.

== Plot ==
A Hungarian (John Cleese) enters a tobacconist's shop carrying a Hungarian-to-English phrasebook and begins a dialogue with the tobacconist (Terry Jones); he wants to buy cigarettes, but his phrasebook's translations are wholly inaccurate and have no resemblance to what he wants to say. Many of them are plainly bizarre ("My hovercraft is full of eels", when he is asking for matches) and become mildly sexual in nature as the skit progresses ("Do you want to come back to my place, bouncy-bouncy?") After the customer uses gestures to convey his desire to pay for his purchases, the tobacconist looks in the phrasebook to find a Hungarian translation for "six and six" (i.e., six shillings and sixpence, or £0.32 1/2); he reads out a "Hungarian" phrase (this phrase is nonsense, written to sound like a foreign language), which provokes the Hungarian to punch him in the face.

A policeman (Graham Chapman), hearing the punch from a considerable distance, runs to the shop. (In the 1971 film version, he commandeers a bicycle from an innocent rider.) The policeman asks about what happened, to which the Hungarian tells him "You have beautiful thighs", confusing the officer, until the Shopkeeper explains that the Hungarian assaulted him. The Hungarian angrily points out the shopkeeper to the constable, saying "Drop your panties Sir William, I cannot wait 'til lunchtime." In anger and confusion, the policeman arrests the Hungarian, who protests absurdly, "My nipples explode with delight!"

The publisher of the phrasebook, Alexander Yalt (Michael Palin), is taken to court, where he pleads not guilty to a charge of intent to cause a breach of the peace. During initial questioning, the prosecutor (Eric Idle) hits a gong after Yalt answers "yes" to a question (an allusion to the British television game show Take Your Pick!). After the prosecutor reads some samples from the book (a mistranslation for "Can you direct me to the station?" actually reads "Please fondle my bum."), Yalt changes his plea to incompetence. A policeman in the court (Chapman) asks for an adjournment. When the judge (Jones) denies the request, the policeman lets off a loud fart he has been trying to suppress. When the judge asks him why he did not mention the reason he wanted an adjournment, the policeman responds, "I didn't know an acceptable legal phrase, m'lud."

== Cast ==
- John Cleese as the Hungarian and then a barrister
- Terry Jones as the tobacconist and then the magistrate
- Graham Chapman as the flatulent policeman
- Michael Palin as the publisher
- Eric Idle as the clerk, prosecutor, and voice-over journalist

== Location ==
The 1970 version is partly filmed in London in Dunraven Road. The tobacconist exterior location is 107 Thorpebank Road (on the corner of Dunraven Road). This was renovated back into a private residence in 1996. This corner is also used for The Ministry of Silly Walks sketch.

== In other Python works ==
In the same episode, the Hungarian character appears briefly in the "Spam" sketch.

The sketch also appears in the film And Now for Something Completely Different. In this version, another Hungarian (Jones) tells someone on the street (Chapman), "Please fondle my buttocks", a mistranslation of "Please direct me to the railway station." The listener then gives the Hungarian directions in English with the Hungarian following his directions in a Terry Gilliam animation.

== See also ==
- My postillion has been struck by lightning
