= Undertakers sketch =

Monty Python sketch

The Undertakers sketch (written by Graham Chapman and John Cleese) is a comedy sketch from the 26th episode of Monty Python's Flying Circus, entitled "Royal Episode 13". It was the final sketch of the thirteenth and final episode of the second series, and was perhaps the most notorious of the Python team's television sketches.

== Plot ==
The sketch begins when a quietly spoken man (Cleese) takes his dead mother to an undertakers' office. The tactless undertaker (Chapman) suggests they can "burn 'er, bury 'er, or dump 'er in the Thames", but rules out the last option after Cleese confirms that he liked his mother. Of the other two, the undertaker says both are "nasty" and describes the sordid details. When the son shows the undertaker his mother's body, which is in a sack, he sees that the dead woman "looks quite young". He tells his assistant, Fred (Eric Idle) that he thinks they've "got an eater", to which Fred responds that he'll get the oven warm. The grieving son is shocked by the idea of eating his mother's corpse, but eventually succumbs to "feeling a bit peckish". He still feels uneasy, but when the undertaker suggests digging a grave for him to throw up into (in case he feels "a bit guilty afterwards"), he agrees. Midway through the sketch, the audience begins to jeer at the cast (alongside people laughing), and by the end, a number of audience members storm the stage as the camera pans to a machine displaying the ending credits. As the credits roll and are superimposed on the screen, the national anthem of the United Kingdom begins to play, and the crowd stands at attention.

== Production ==
The BBC were wary of the sketch, and reluctantly agreed to let it go ahead on the condition that the studio audience were heard to protest loudly, then invade the set at the sketch's conclusion. This was poorly executed: the audience began booing and shouting too early (those who were not heckling were laughing), and because of studio fire regulations, only a limited section of the crowd were allowed to rush onto the studio floor; the rest simply sat there looking awkward. (As Roger Wilmut pointed out in the book From Fringe To Flying Circus, a genuinely shocked (British) audience would have reacted with an embarrassed silence.)

Following its initial broadcast of the sketch in 1970, the BBC wiped the sketch from the master tape and replaced it with the "Spot the Braincell" sketch from episode 7 of the second series ("The Attila the Hun Show"). However, when the second series was released on BBC Video in 1985, episode 13 was "restored", thanks to the discovery of a (low quality) copy of the sketch that appears to be sourced from either an off-air recording of a foreign duplicate of the original show, or possibly Terry Jones' own home tape copy. This restored episode was finally shown again on television in 1987 as part of a complete (if frequently interrupted) run of second and third series repeats.

== Context ==
The sketch was part of a longer running joke within the episode, which was that they expected Queen Elizabeth II to watch the show at some point. This would be indicated by the playing of "God Save the Queen", which occurs during the "Insurance Sketch", where it was stopped when they hear she switched to ITV, followed by a shot of ITN’s Reginald Bosanquet presenting News at Ten when the anthem plays and Bosanquet stands at attention while continuing to read the news. The final scene, after the desultory audience invasion, has the entire studio coming to a halt (including the portion of the audience that had rushed the stage) and standing at attention while "God Save the Queen" is played, and the end credits roll.

To juxtapose the joke that the Queen would be watching, the episode also deliberately featured many of Monty Python's most tasteless sketches. This sketch, the last in both the episode and the second series, immediately followed the "Lifeboat sketch" (also about cannibalism, and which also had the audience jeering in disgust at the end), followed by a letter from a military man concurring with their disgust where the punchline was that it was the Royal Air Force that was suffering from cannibalism, some graphically cannibalistic animation from Terry Gilliam, and an appeal for decency by Terry Jones. Nevertheless, it was this sketch which was most notorious for its tastelessness, and Cleese made specific reference to it alone in his eulogy for Chapman, when recalling Chapman's talent for pushing the boundaries of bad taste.

== Miscellany ==
This sketch should not be confused with the "Undertakers film" from episode 11 of series 1. The Undertakers film showed, in several snippets throughout the episode, a team of increasingly fatigued undertakers struggling to carry a coffin through the streets.

An audio version of the sketch, minus audience interruptions, was recorded in 1971 for the team's second album Another Monty Python Record.
