= Marriage Guidance Counsellor =

Monty Python sketch

The Marriage Guidance Counsellor sketch is from the second Monty Python's Flying Circus episode, "Sex and Violence", first broadcast late on Sunday, 12 October 1969. Written by Eric Idle, it was also featured in the 1971 spinoff film And Now for Something Completely Different.

The sketch features Michael Palin and Carol Cleveland as a married couple (Arthur and Deirdre Pewtey) and Eric Idle as their marriage counsellor. The marriage guidance counsellor flirts with a receptive Mrs Pewtey rather than giving the couple advice, and Mr Pewtey fails to react to this behaviour and stand up for himself, even to the point where he meekly leaves the room when asked by the counsellor, who is clearly about to make love to Mrs. Pewtey. In the TV version, an American cowboy (John Cleese) convinces him he must "be a man" while in the film, the voice of God (also Cleese) convinces him.

When Mr. Pewtey again compliantly retreats in response to the counsellor's demand to leave the amorous couple alone, the TV version of the sketch features him, in a familiar Python prank, getting hit in the head with a chicken by a knight in a suit of armour (Terry Gilliam). In And Now for Something Completely Different, it instead features another routine Python prank, a giant 16-ton weight being dropped onto Pewtey's body. The words "So much for Pathos!" pop up, ending both versions of the sketch.
