= The Mouse Problem =

Monty Python sketch from Monty Python's Flying Circus

- Monty Python's Flying Circus segment
- Screenshot from episode
- Episode no.: Series 1 Episode 2 (segment)
- Written by: John Cleese; Graham Chapman
- Original air date: October 12, 1969

"The Mouse Problem" is a Monty Python sketch, first aired on 12 October 1969 as part of "Sex and Violence", the second episode of the first series of Monty Python's Flying Circus.

== Overview ==
In the sketch, an interviewer (Terry Jones) and linkman (Michael Palin) for a fictional programme called The World Around Us, investigate the phenomenon of "men [who] want to be mice". The programme bears a striking similarity to an episode of Panorama; even its theme tune, the fourth movement of Rachmaninoff's Symphony No. 1, was the theme tune of Panorama at the time. The sketch was originally written for The Magic Christian but was not used.

A "confessor" (John Cleese) is interviewed about his experience as a mouse: when he was a teenager, he got drunk at a party and experimented with cheese, and gradually came to accept his mouse identity. "It's not a question of wanting to be a mouse — it just sort of happens to you," he tells the interviewer. "All of a sudden you realize… that's what you want to be." The "programme" features undercover footage of a "mouse party", where Cleese explains that "there's a big clock in the middle of the room, and about 12:50 you climb up it and then... eventually, it strikes one and you all run down". He also points out that there's "a farmer's wife" present. Then follows a discussion with psychiatrist and conjuror, The Amazing Kargol (Graham Chapman), about what attracts men to the mouse lifestyle. A series of vox pops illustrates societal attitudes towards mice men, and several historical figures who were mice, such as Julius Caesar and Napoleon, are shown, "and, of course Hilaire Belloc," is included. The programme also includes footage of men in mouse costumes being led into police stations, newspaper headlines about mouse scandals and mouse rights demonstrations, and photos of "mouse clubs".

In the original version of the sketch broadcast in 1969, Cleese gave out the telephone number of the mouse man as "01-584 5313". The number was that of David Frost's production company, which led to a large number of annoying telephone calls to Frost. The sketch was re-edited for the repeat showing in August 1970 to remove this section.

The way of life explored in "The Mouse Problem" is an obvious parody of the secretive lives and social condemnation of gay men in the 1960s, and the sketch itself mimics the film and interview techniques used in serious television documentary exposés on the subject, but also makes reference to transvestism, recreational drug use, orgies and other behaviour considered "deviant" by the standards of the late 1960s. Eric Zorn of the Chicago Tribune notes its similarity to a real 1967 documentary, CBS Reports: The Homosexuals. Chapman, who wrote the sketch, was himself gay.

== See also ==
- List of Monty Python's Flying Circus episodes
