= Albatross sketch =

1970 Monty Python sketch

"Albatross" is a sketch from Monty Python's Flying Circus. It is particularly known for its opening lines: "Albatross! Albatross! Albatross!"

The sketch first appeared on British television on 11 January 1970 in episode 13 of the first series, "Intermission." It features John Cleese and Terry Jones. Despite its short running time (40 seconds) it has proven to be quite memorable for Python fans and was frequently performed during the team's live shows.

== The sketch ==
A man, played by John Cleese, is dressed as an ice-cream girl in a cinema, although instead of the regular cinema snacks she is selling a dead albatross which is tied to a hawker tray around her neck. A man (Terry Jones) approaches her and asks for two choc ices. The girl aggressively makes clear she only sells an albatross and continues shouting to draw attention to her merchandise, while the potential customer keeps asking questions about the product, like "What flavour is it?" and "Do you get wafers with it?". Finally, the man buys two albatrosses for nine pence each. The salesgirl then shouts she is selling "gannet on a stick."

Later during the episode, several other characters in other sketches shout "Albatross!" for seemingly no reason at all.

== Other appearances ==
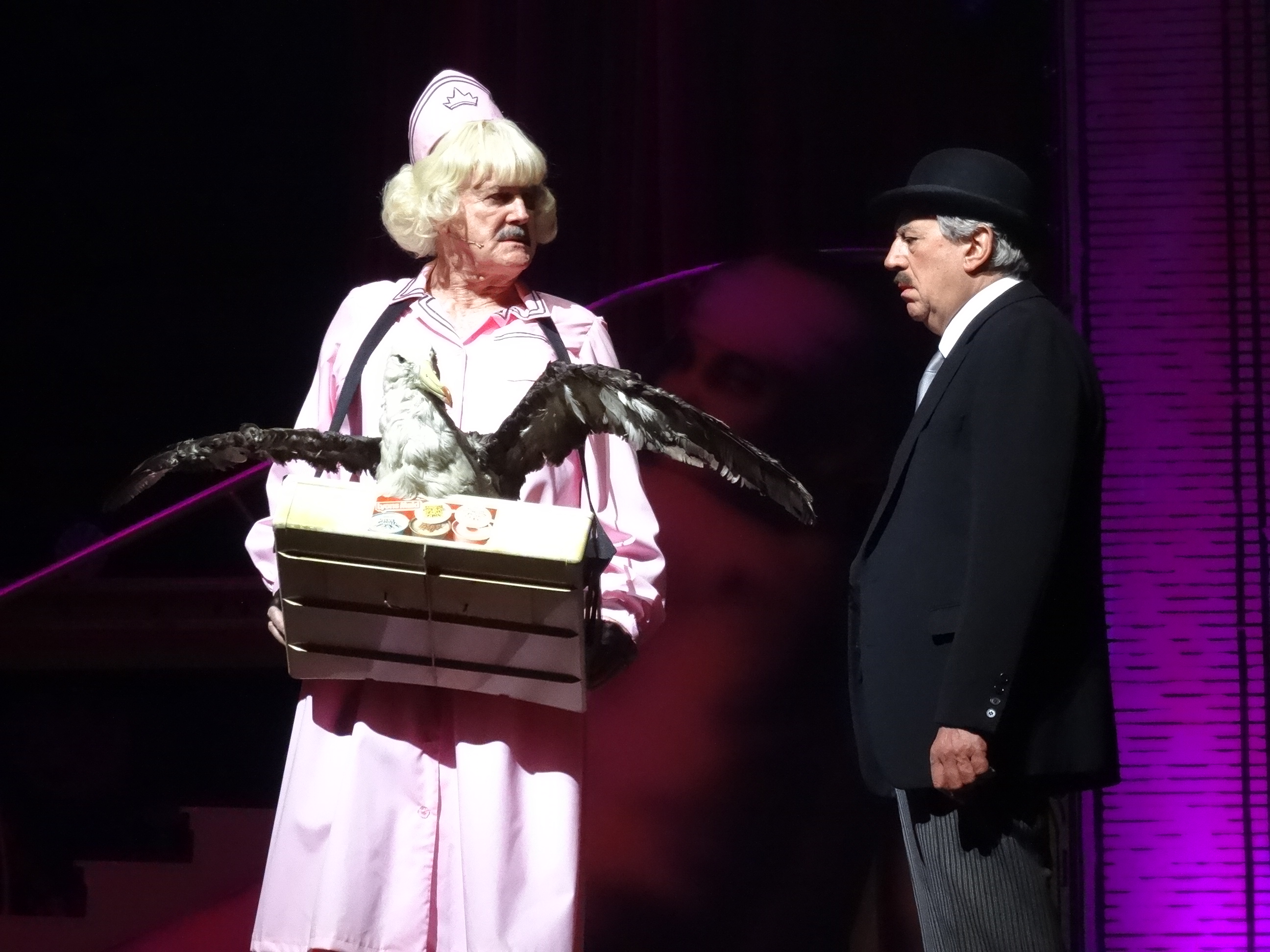
Albatross sketch at Monty Python Live (Mostly), London, in 2014.

The sketch was frequently performed live. In both the film Monty Python Live at the Hollywood Bowl (1982) and the Monty Python Live (Mostly) stage show, the sketch eventually segues into "Nudge, Nudge" when Jones' character is directed into a pub, where he meets Eric Idle's "Arthur Name" character.

On the US-only live album Monty Python Live at City Center, and similarly on Monty Python Live at the Hollywood Bowl, Cleese uses stronger language than in the original TV broadcast ("Of course you don't get fucking wafers with it, you cunt! It's a fucking albatross!" in Live at the Hollywood Bowl) and verbally abuses the customer ("I've only got one, you cocksucker!" in Live at City Center when asked for two albatrosses). Eventually, their dialogue is interrupted by the Colonel (Graham Chapman), who stops the sketch because of the "filthy" language. He tells Jones he is needed onstage for the next skit, then admonishes Cleese with "And you get off! You aren't even a proper woman!", to which Cleese replies, "Don't you oppress me, mate!"
