= Piranha Brothers =

Monty Python sketch

- Monty Python's Flying Circus segment
- Screenshot from the episode
- Episode no.: Series 2 Episode 1 (segment)
- Written by: John Cleese; Graham Chapman
- Original air date: 15 September 1970

"Piranha Brothers" is a Monty Python sketch from the first episode of the second series of Monty Python's Flying Circus. The 14th episode of the series overall, it premiered on BBC1 in the United Kingdom on 15 September 1970. The sketch constitutes a loose pastiche of the Richardson gang and the Kray twins, notorious gangsters from the East End of London in the 1950s and 1960s, and the latter's investigation by Nipper Read.

A slightly re-worked version of the sketch appeared on the album Another Monty Python Record, released in the UK on 8 October 1971, and in the United States on 21 August 1972. It was also featured in Monty Python's Big Red Book, published in 1971.

== Plot ==
The premise for the sketch is a BBC current affairs documentary programme, inexplicably titled Ethel the Frog, retrospectively covering the exploits of the brothers Doug and Dinsdale Piranha. We learn through the mockumentary that Dinsdale and Doug were born "on probation" in the slums of London, with their father, Arthur Piranha, employed as a scrap‐metal dealer and TV quizmaster. The brothers are reported to intimidate their victims through 'violence and sarcasm'. Through a series of interviews with their victims, we find out that Dinsdale has a peculiar habit of nailing his foes' heads to the floor, while Doug is reported to be more vicious by assailing his enemies with sarcasm: "He knew all the tricks, dramatic irony, metaphor, bathos, puns, parody, litotes and... satire". One of those interviewed, the stereotypical Italian mobster and recurring Python character Luigi Vercotti, says he has "seen grown men pull off their own heads rather than face Doug".

We are also told by another interviewee, a drag queen girlfriend, that Dinsdale is afraid of "Spiny Norman", a gigantic imaginary hedgehog whose reported size varies on the basis of his mood. The threat of Norman has affected Dinsdale so severely that it leads him to launch a nuclear attack on an aircraft hangar, where Norman was thought to have resided, at Luton Airfield on 22 February 1966, attracting the attention of the authorities ("Even the police began to sit up and take notice.") and causing a trans-Atlantic pursuit led by Police Superintendent Harry "Snapper" Organs of Q Division. At the end of the sketch, which also ends the episode, the creature is revealed as being real and appearing in an animated form bellowing "Dinsdale" beside various English landmarks as the credits roll.

== Album and book ==
Another Monty Python Record, released in 1971, features the sketch with a slightly different version, whereas instead of a nuclear attack on the airport, the brothers are said to have napalmed Cheltenham. This version ends with one of the Piranha Brothers' associates interrupting the recording and accidentally scratching the record, causing a continuous loop in the album's run-out groove. The sketch can also be found being re-told in Monty Python's Big Red Book.

== In culture ==
The sketch is notable for being highlighted on various 'best of Monty Python lists' featured in magazines, newspapers and websites. Entertainment Weekly listed the act at number 5 on their top 20 essential sketches; GQ Magazine said it was one of four notable mockumentaries; The Daily Beast included it in their funniest routines from the series; The Daily Telegraph reported it as number 5 on their 10 funniest skits; GamesRadar gave it top ranking as number 1 on their compilation of funniest performances; and Nerdist said the piece was one of "The 8 and a Half Most Underrated Monty Python Sketches".

Memorable quotes from the sketch have also been referenced in newspaper and magazine articles throughout the years since it was first broadcast in 1970.

A heavy metal group took its name, Ethel the Frog, from this sketch. The band is best known for taking part in the Metal for Muthas multi-artist compilation album, released in 1980.

The noted Massachusetts-based audio recording facility Q Division Studios takes its name from the police division depicted in this sketch.

== See also ==
- List of recurring Monty Python's Flying Circus characters
- Python (Monty) Pictures
