= The Dirty Fork =

Monty Python sketch

The Dirty Fork, also known simply as Restaurant Sketch, is a Monty Python sketch that appeared in episode 3 of the first series of the television series Monty Python's Flying Circus, and later in the film, And Now For Something Completely Different. It is notable for being the first Monty Python sketch wherein the characters react to the audience "booing" them.

Entertainment Weekly has ranked The Restaurant Sketch as one of Monty Python's top 20 sketches. In England, it is used in approved course materials for Key Stage 2 of the state school curriculum.

== Synopsis ==
A man (Graham Chapman) and his wife (Carol Cleveland) are enjoying a night out at an expensive French restaurant. The man discovers that he has been given a dirty fork and politely asks Gaston the waiter to replace it.

Gaston (Terry Jones) apologizes profusely and runs to get the head waiter, Gilberto (Michael Palin). Gilberto arrives, demands that the entire washing-up staff be fired, tells Gaston to report this news to the manager immediately, and recoils in disgust at the fork.

The manager (Eric Idle) arrives, tells Gilberto to relax, then sits down at the table and apologizes "humbly, deeply, and sincerely" for the dirty fork. He becomes emotional when explaining the problems the restaurant staff has been suffering, and bursts into tears. Mungo the cook (John Cleese) enters, berating the couple for criticizing such a vulnerable man, and swings his cleaver onto their table. Gilberto clutches his head, complaining about his "war wound". The manager stabs himself in the stomach with the dirty fork, screaming "It's the end! The end!" and collapses to the ground dead.

Mungo lifts his knife over Chapman and cries, "Revenge!" Gilberto rounds the corner and grabs the angry cook just in time. "Mungo!" he gasps, "Mungo, never kill a customer!" Gilberto dies from his war wound. Mungo raises his knife again, but Gaston tackles him before he can kill the diner. A caption reads, "And Now… The Punchline!"

"Lucky we didn't say anything about the dirty knife," Chapman says into the camera. The audience then boos as Chapman objects to it.

There are several changes to the sketch in the And Now For Something Completely Different version. The waiter is named "Giuseppe" instead of "Gaston". There's no audience and the actors do not boo when Chapman delivers the "punchline" which was changed slightly to "Lucky I didn't tell them about the dirty knife".

== Writing style ==
This sketch reflects Python's thoughts about punch lines. The Monty Python troupe had decided from the start that they were going to throw away punchlines, and this was a play on the shows that would use corny lines like the dirty knife. Most Python sketches just end abruptly, and sometimes even characters say "What a stupid sketch" and walk out. In Monty Python Live in Aspen, Terry Gilliam explains:

Our first rule was: no punch lines... [some sketches] start brilliant, great acting, really funny sketch, but a punchline is just not as good as the rest of the sketch, so it kills the entire thing. That's why we eliminated them."

Ironically, the episode the sketch appeared in concludes with the sketch "Candid Photography" (better known as "Nudge Nudge"), which concludes with a punch line.
