= Upper Class Twit of the Year =

Monty Python sketch

"Upper Class Twit of the Year" is a comedy sketch that was seen on the 1970 Monty Python's Flying Circus episode "The Naked Ant" (series 1, episode 12), and also in a modified format as the finale of the movie And Now for Something Completely Different. It is notable for its satire on dimwitted members of the English upper class. Its title is a reference to the Horse of the Year Show, because equestrianism is often regarded as an upper-class pursuit in the UK.

== Scenario ==
To a horserace-style commentary by John Cleese, we view an obstacle-course race among five stereotypical, upper-class twits, to determine the 127th Annual Upper-Class Twit of the Year.

The competitors are:

- Vivian Smith-Smythe-Smith (portrayed by Eric Idle in MPFC and John Cleese in ANFSCD)
  - Has an O-level in chemo-hygiene (MPFC only)
  - Can count up to 4 (ANFSCD only)
  - Is in the Grenadier Guards (ANFSCD only)
- Simon Zinc-Trumpet-Harris (portrayed by Terry Jones in MPFC and Eric Idle in ANFSCD)
  - An Old Etonian (ANFSCD only)
  - Married to a very attractive table lamp
- Nigel Incubator-Jones (portrayed by John Cleese in MPFC and Terry Jones in ANFSCD)
  - Best friend is a tree
  - A stockbroker in his spare time
- Gervaise Brook-Hampster (portrayed by Michael Palin in both versions)
  - Used as a wastepaper basket by his father
  - Also in the Guards
  - Is in the wine trade (ANFSCD only)
- Oliver St John-Mollusc (portrayed by Graham Chapman in both versions)
  - Another old Etonian (ANFSCD only)
  - His father was a Cabinet Minister, and his mother won the Derby. (ANFSCD only)
  - Said to be this year's outstanding twit.

At the start, the twits face the wrong way, so the starter turns them round. They then don't run because they don't know they have to move when the gun goes off. The starter explains the idea to the twits, who respond by laughing and pointing at him.

The obstacles are, in order:

- Walking Along The Straight Line
  - The Twits must walk along one of several narrow straight lines a few feet apart, without falling over.
- The Matchbox Jump
  - The Twits must jump over a fence that is three matchboxes high. In And Now for Something Completely Different, this is changed to two matchboxes. (Vivian refuses the fence in the film.)
- Kicking The Beggar
  - The Twits must approach a beggar with a tray and kick him until he falls over.
- The Hunt Ball Photograph (MPFC only)
  - The Twits must have their photographs taken and make small talk with a pair of attractive females, Lady Arabella Plunkett and Lady Sarah Pencil Farthing Vivian Streamroller Adams Pie Biscuit Aftershave Gore Stringbottom Smith.
- Reversing Into The Old Lady
  - The Twits must get into their sports cars and reverse them into a cardboard cut-out of an old lady, then speed off. On this obstacle, Oliver St John-Mollusc proves his outstanding twitness by managing to run himself over, rendering himself dead, but not necessarily out of the competition. This leads straight into...
- Waking The Neighbour
  - The Twits must drive their cars forward and then try to wake up a neighbour attempting to get some sleep by slamming their doors, tooting their horns, etc.
- Insulting The Waiter (MPFC only)
  - The Twits must be thoroughly rude to a waiter with a tray.
- The Bar (MPFC only)
  - The Twits must make their way underneath a wooden bar suspended five feet off the ground.
- Shooting The Rabbits
  - Each Twit is given a shotgun; and he must shoot a rabbit that has been tied very firmly to several stakes so it can't move around very much (as the Upper-Class Twit of the Year is only a one-day event). Several of the Twits are forced to bludgeon the rabbit to death with the butt of their gun or a fist. Their failure to hit the rabbits with their shotguns is attributed to the misty conditions (caused by the gunsmoke) and the shooting distance of nearly one foot.
- Taking The Bras Off The Debutantes
  - The Twits must remove a bra from a mannequin representing a debutante while standing in front of it. It is claimed to be the most difficult obstacle by the commentator: many of the Twits even dismember the mannequins in their attempts to remove the bras, and a few still have bras (often with torsos still dangling from them) stuck to their hands as they go on to the final event:
- Shooting Themselves
  - Finally, the Twits approach a table with five revolvers on it. The winner is the first Twit to shoot himself.

The sketch ends with Gervaise Brook-Hampster coming in first, followed by Smith-Smythe-Smith (shot by Nigel in ANFSCD, shot by Simon in MPFC) and Nigel Incubator-Jones in a medal ceremony, while Simon Zinc-Trumpet-Harris manages to club himself unconscious with the butt of his gun (in MPFC, the men also are interchanged). The three coffins of the winning Twits are placed on the medal rostrum and medals are draped around them. Cleese ends his commentary by remarking that "there'll certainly be some car door slamming in the streets of Kensington tonight!" However, in ANFSCD the standings are different with Simon accidentally shooting Vivian into second place then shooting himself into third place and Nigel knocking himself unconscious.

== Production ==
- In MPFC there is a very small crowd, which is mainly made up of cardboard cut-outs of donkeys, whereas in ANFSCD stock footage of large crowds in stadiums is used.
- The TV sketch was filmed at Hurlingham Park in Fulham. This fact is mentioned at the beginning of the sketch.
- The film sketch was made at Stirling Corner Sports Centre near Borehamwood.

== Inspiration ==
John Cleese has stated that the idea for the "wake the neighbour" part was inspired by an apartment he once rented that was near a bar whose patrons kept him awake at night when they slammed the doors on their cars. This is also mentioned in trivia notes included on the A&E DVD release of Season 1, though the wording there suggests the entire sketch may have been inspired by the people Cleese encountered, not just "wake the neighbour".

== See also ==
- Sloane Ranger
