= List of recurring Monty Python's Flying Circus characters =

Very few characters of the BBC television series Monty Python's Flying Circus appeared in more than one episode, and when they did, it was usually to link sketches together. A few well-known characters are described below.

== "It's" man ==
Played by Michael Palin. Dressed in rags, and sporting a long beard, much like an island castaway, this character would start most of the early shows by struggling to cross a landscape of dangers until he got close enough to the camera to say "It's—", immediately followed by the opening credits and musical theme. In one episode, the character had his own talk show, featuring Ringo Starr and Lulu as guests, but was unable to get past his single word catch phrase before being interrupted by Monty Python's opening theme music. At the end of the programme he is usually forced to go back across the same dangerous landscape.

== Announcer ==
Played by John Cleese. Often found in a farmer's field, or the back of a moving truck, this character was a BBC Announcer who usually said only the "And now for something completely different" tagline as a way of linking unrelated sketches, or to introduce the show in the cold open. In later episodes the Announcer tagline was delivered by Michael Palin. The Announcer was intended to mock the formal style of BBC announcers of the time. He appeared in a pond, while wearing a bikini, in a pig pen, and many other odd places. As well as the opening scenes, Cleese played the Announcer character in a number of sketches including "The Time on BBC 1" in episode 19 which examines the Announcer's confidence problems and "Take your pick" in episode 20 in which the Announcer pontificates about "Bergsonian comedy". Henri Bergson's theory of comedy apparently had some real influence on Cleese and the other Pythons.

== Naked organist ==
Initially played by Terry Gilliam in the Blackmail sketch in episode eighteen, "Live from the Grill-O-Mat", the organist was made famous by Terry Jones during the third season, as he would appear in the opening sequence immediately followed by the two aforementioned characters, the "It's" man and the Announcer. Jones would appear naked in front of an organ, often placed in bizarre locations. The organist never had any true spoken lines but was considered a staple of the third series. In "Njorl's Saga" in episode 27 the organist is used to bring what appears to be an epic historical production to a swift end just before the opening credits roll and the audience realises they have been misled on the nature of the programme they are watching.

The introductory naked organist sketch ("A Naked Man") for episode 35 was shot in Jersey along with the "It's" Man and other pre-credits scenes.

== Mr. Badger ==
Played by Eric Idle, Mr. Badger's usual method is to interrupt sketches without warning ("I'll not interrupt this sketch for a pound"). He speaks with a slight Scottish accent. Mr Badger first appeared in episode 32 (The War Against Pornography), but first demonstrated his trademark "badgering" in episode 35 in the "Bomb on Plane" sketch.

== Pepperpots ==
The term "Pepperpots" refers to any of the middle-aged, matronly type women played by the men of Monty Python, first appearing in the "Whizzo Butter" sketch in episode 2 (written as episode 1 but broadcast later). The sketch was a parody of Stork margarine advertising, well known at the time, in which members of the public claim they cannot tell the difference between Stork and butter. The Pepperpots when interviewed claim they cannot tell the difference between Whizzo butter and dead crab. A pepperpot is usually somewhat overweight and wears a rather unflattering ensemble often topped off by a small, old-fashioned hat. She holds a small purse in her gloved hands, and is very often seen out and about, apparently running errands while her husband is at work. She usually speaks in a high voice that sounds very much like that of a man imitating a woman. The Pepperpots are given different names in various sketches: Mrs. Premise, Mrs. Conclusion, Mrs. Nesbitt, Mrs. Smoker, Mrs. Non-Smoker, Mrs. Thing, Mrs. Entity, Mrs. Cutout etc.

The main influence for the Pepperpots was the character Mrs. Pepperpot from the children's stories of author Alf Prøysen. Another influence may have been playwright Terence Rattigan who is played by Cleese in episode 30. Rattigan describes a character, Aunt Edna, with similar characteristics to the Pepperpots. Rattigan is condescending about the intellectual abilities of the Aunt Edna types, but the Pythons repeatedly give the Pepperpots a surprising depth of knowledge, possibly as a critique of Rattigan. This particular feature of Pepperpots has been played to humorous effect, such as two Pepperpots sailing to France to visit Jean-Paul Sartre to ask him about his work, or one complaining about kids having their heads filled with Cartesian dualism. Lady Violet Bonham Carter is also suggested as an influence.

== Gumbys ==
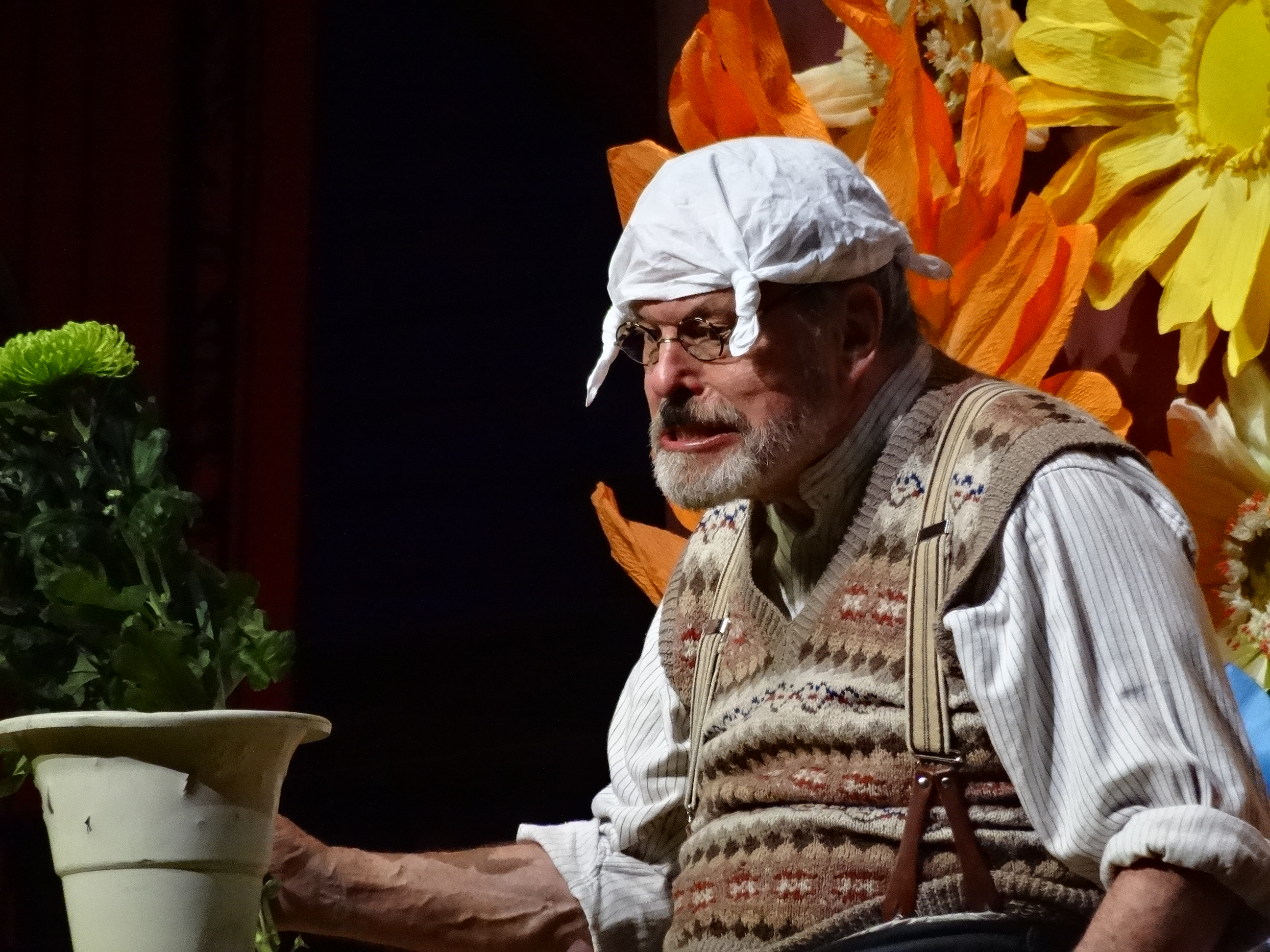
Gumby flower arranging. He is played here by Terry Gilliam at the Python reunion, Monty Python Live (Mostly), in July 2014.

Gumbys are characters of limited intelligence and vocabulary. They speak haltingly, in a loud, indistinct manner. They wear round wire glasses, Fair Isle pattern sweater vests and Wellington boots, which leads to their alternative name of the "gum boots" and the influence for the name "Gumby." Their shirt sleeves and trouser legs are always rolled up, exposing their forearms and calves. Gumbys stand stoop-shouldered, with their hands permanently clenched in front of them, elbows slightly bent, and their feet turned to the outside. They wear folded white handkerchiefs knotted at the corners on their heads, which supposedly limit their intelligence (as they are sometimes more normal until they put them on), and have toothbrush moustaches. Their most famous catchphrases are "My brain hurts!" and repeated shouts of "Hello!" and "Sorry!" The Gumby character first appeared in "Secret Service Dentists" in episode 5, but without being named.

The Gumbys were part of the Pythons' satirical view of 1970s television condescendingly encouraging more involvement from the "man on the street." Gumbys were frequently cast as intellectuals, but invariably exposed their own stupidity while trying to voice an intelligent opinion. The first was played by John Cleese, however, most of the time, they would be played by Michael Palin. All of the Pythons have played one of them at one time or another. The Pythons did not always have ordinary people as dimwitted as the Gumbys. "Stadium of Light, Jarrow" seems to support the new television philosophy.

The "first official Monty Python Guinness world record attempt," scheduled on the 50th anniversary of the first show, 5 October 2019, broke the record for "the largest gathering of people dressed as Gumbys."

== The Colonel ==
The Colonel, described in one of the scripts as "excruciatingly public school," the character, played by Graham Chapman, is an officer of the British Army with an authoritative bearing. He is known to interrupt sketches when he feels that they have become too silly and demand that something else be shown. The Colonel made a cameo appearance on an episode of the NBC sketch comedy series Saturday Night Live when one of the sketches seemed to lack a conclusion.

In real life, Chapman attended a charity football match, "Monty Python Versus the Rest of the World," dressed as the Colonel. Chapman thought the rest of the Pythons were taking the match too seriously, and in any case he preferred rugby, so he walked around shouting orders and trying to obstruct play rather than actually playing. However, he was out-sillied when Keith Moon (playing for the Rest of the World) brought a car onto the pitch and used it to score several goals.

== Knight ==
Played by Terry Gilliam. A medieval knight whose only function is to conclude a sketch when it has run its course. He does this by entering the scene, hitting one of the characters on the head with a rubber chicken, and then turning around and walking away silently. His face is never seen, as he is wearing a helmet and full armour, and he never speaks, with the exception of a brief line in the "Johann Gambolputty" sketch, during a montage of people saying the long name of the central character. Only once does he not hit a victim on the head: during episode five, "Man's Crisis of Identity During the Latter Half of the Twentieth Century," he approaches a Gumby (played by John Cleese) who has finished a rant about foreigners. Cleese covers his head in anticipation, and the Knight strikes Cleese in the abdomen. Cleese limps away and the Knight follows him with his chicken raised. In another episode, "The Ant (An introduction)," the Knight appears waiting for his cue to hit somebody, only to be told by a stagehand (Michael Palin) that they don't need him this week.

The BBC paid Gilliam extra for the episodes in which he appeared as the Knight because he then had a walk-on part.

== Luigi Vercotti ==
Luigi is a low-level East End gangster with Sicilian connections. He is played by Michael Palin in a moustache and wearing sunglasses and a pin-striped suit. He is often involved in operations that turn out to be very poorly camouflaged illegal businesses, such as a nightclub "for the gentry" that is in reality a brothel. He is sometimes seen with his brother Dino, played by Terry Jones. He appears in "Ron Obvious," "Piranha Brothers," and "Army Protection Racket".

== Mr Eric Praline ==
Played by John Cleese, Praline is introduced during the Crunchy Frog sketch as "Inspector Praline" of Hygiene Squad. He later, more famously, returns a dead parrot to the pet shop where he bought it. Praline has more problems in series 2 when he tries to buy a licence for his fish, Eric. He also pops up in a handful of short links, notably hosting a chat show with his flatmate Brooky (Idle) that is pre-empted and cut, although the two return in a later sketch (Seven Brides for Seven Brothers) from the same episode.

== Vikings ==
The Viking most often appears as a linking element, usually played by Gilliam, but also Cleese and Palin on occasions. Like the Knight, the Viking is used to satirise the television practice of smooth linking by deliberately drawing attention to the link element, and thus breaking the smooth transition. This is one of many ways the Pythons broke and ridiculed the conventions of television production by taking them to extremes.

A running gag in the show is to allow the Viking to speak only one word before being interrupted. "Njorl's Saga" in episode 27 takes this to extremes where Njorl is repeatedly interrupted by two Pepperpots. Perhaps the most well known viking scene is "Spam" in episode 25 where a group of vikings burst into song, the lyrics of which are mainly "spam" chanted repeatedly, every time spam is mentioned. Terry Jones went on to direct the feature film Erik the Viking after the Pythons went their separate ways.

== Bibliography ==
- Chapman, Graham, The Complete Monty Python's Flying Circus, volume 1, Pantheon Books, 1989 ISBN 9780679726470.
- Chapman, Graham, The Complete Monty Python's Flying Circus, volume 2, Pantheon Books, 1989 ISBN 9780679726487.
- Chapman, Graham; Yoakum, Jim (ed), Calcium Made Interesting: Sketches, Letters, Essays & Gondolas, Pan Macmillan, 2006 ISBN 9780330435437.
- Cogan, Brian; Massey, Jeff, Everything I Ever Needed to Know About _____* I Learned from Monty Python, Macmillan, 2014 ISBN 9781466842168.
- Landy, Marcia, Monty Python's Flying Circus, Wayne State University Press, 2005 ISBN 9780814331033.
- Larsen, Darl, Monty Python's Flying Circus: An Utterly Complete, Thoroughly Unillustrated, Absolutely Unauthorized Guide to Possibly All the References, Scarecrow Press, 2008 ISBN 9781461669708.
- McCall Douglas, Monty Python: A Chronology, 1969–2012, McFarland, 2013 ISBN 9780786478118.
- Miller, Jeffrey S., Something Completely Different: British Television and American Culture, University of Minnesota Press, 2000 ISBN 9780816632404.
