= Crunchy Frog =

Monty Python sketch

"Crunchy Frog" is the common name for a Monty Python sketch officially titled "Trade Description Act" (sometimes also known as the "Whizzo Chocolate Company" sketch), inspired by the Trade Descriptions Act 1968 in British law. It features two health inspectors interrogating the owner of a sweet shop about the increasingly bizarre ingredients in his confections, including the titular crunchy frog. Written by John Cleese and Graham Chapman, it originally appeared in episode 6 of the first series of Monty Python's Flying Circus, and later appeared in several Monty Python stage shows. In the original sketch, Cleese and Chapman play the inspectors, while Terry Jones plays the sweet shop owner. In later versions, the second inspector is played by Terry Gilliam or left out of the sketch entirely.

== The sketch ==
Mr Milton, the owner of the Whizzo Chocolate Company (Terry Jones) is approached by two members of the Hygiene Squad, Inspector Praline (John Cleese) and Superintendent Parrot (Graham Chapman). The officers confront him about the odd flavours that are used in the "Whizzo Quality Assortment", and cite inadequate descriptions of his products as a violation of the Trade Descriptions Act. They ask him to explain the confection labelled "Crunchy Frog". Milton describes it as an entire frog that has been coated with chocolate, using only "the finest baby frogs, dew picked and flown from Iraq, cleansed in finest quality spring water, lightly killed, and then sealed in a succulent Swiss quintuple smooth treble cream milk chocolate envelope and lovingly frosted with glucose." Circular logic is used to explain why the bones aren't taken out: "If we took the bones out, it wouldn't be crunchy, would it?" (While most frogs start life as tadpoles, which have cartilage rather than bones, some species are known to skip this stage and emerge as froglets.)

Other questionable items include the "Cherry Fondue", which is "extremely nasty" but not worthy of prosecution; "Ram's Bladder Cup", made from "fresh Cornish ram's bladder, emptied, steamed, flavoured with sesame seeds whipped into a fondant and garnished with lark's vomit"; "Cockroach Cluster"; "Anthrax Ripple"; and "Spring Surprise", chocolate wrapped around two stainless steel bolts that "spring out and plunge straight through both [of the victim's] cheeks". At the end of the scene Milton is arrested, and the Superintendent, who has been vomiting during the entire conversation (having sampled the Crunchy Frog and some of the others), faces the camera and warns the public to "take more care when buying its sweeties".

A later sketch in the same episode features a North American Indian, played in stereotypical fashion by Eric Idle, eating a Crunchy Frog and indicating approval.

== Stage and film ==
The film Monty Python Live at the Hollywood Bowl also contains a performance of this sketch, with Chapman as the Inspector and Terry Gilliam as his assistant. The assistant is now called Constable Parrot, and while he too periodically leaves the room to fight off his nausea, he remains onstage during his last attack of sickness and vomits into his helmet, which his superior then orders him to put back on his head. (Gilliam filled his mouth with cold beef stew when he ran off stage during the scene.)

The Monty Python Live (Mostly) stage show featured a similar performance, with some small changes to the dialogue – such as, the Ram's Bladder Cup sweet is now described as having been garnished with mouse faeces rather than lark's vomit – and with Cleese as the Inspector. Jones, who was then in the early stages of frontal lobe dementia, read some of his dialogue from the insert cards in the chocolate box. The televised 20 July 2014 performance includes some fluffs and corpsing, and a moment in which Cleese takes a card from Jones and reads his line for him before announcing, "This is me now", and continues with his own line.

== Other appearances ==
- In Monty Python's Big Red Book there is a page designed as a chocolate box insert, with descriptions of all the sweets in the Whizzo Quality Assortment.
- In J. K. Rowling's Harry Potter series, two kinds of sweets seen eaten by the characters are Chocolate Frogs and Cockroach Clusters.
- In Blizzard Entertainment's popular World of Warcraft, Crunchy Frog can be bought as food at the Darkmoon Faire, a travelling carnival.
- The name of the sketch was the inspiration for the name of the Danish indie record label Crunchy Frog Records.
