= Parrot Sketch Not Included – 20 Years of Monty Python =

1989 Monty Python tribute special

- VHS cover art
- Created by: Graham Chapman; John Cleese; Terry Gilliam; Eric Idle; Terry Jones; Michael Palin; Steve Martin
- Starring: Steve Martin; Graham Chapman; John Cleese; Terry Gilliam; Eric Idle; Terry Jones; Michael Palin
- Country of origin: United Kingdom

Production
- Running time: 73 minutes

Original release
- Network: BBC1
- Release: 18 November 1989

Related
- Monty Python's The Meaning of Life; Monty Python Live at Aspen

Parrot Sketch Not Included – 20 Years of Monty Python is a British television special dedicated to Monty Python, created to commemorate the 20th anniversary of the debut of the comedy group's television series, Monty Python's Flying Circus. Produced by Tiger Television for the BBC, it was compiled by renowned British comedy producer John Lloyd and aired on BBC1 on 18 November 1989.

Introduced by actor and Monty Python fan Steve Martin, the special showcases various sketches from Monty Python's Flying Circus, along with some sketches from the two German specials, Monty Python's Fliegender Zirkus. As indicated by its title, the "Dead Parrot sketch" is intentionally omitted. It concluded with the final appearance of all six Python members together, before Graham Chapman's death in October 1989.

The special was broadcast in the US on the Showtime network on 17 March 1990. This was 90 seconds shorter than the UK version due to a cut scene from the end of the pre-credits sequence which had Steve Martin revealing, via a slowed down clip of the Bruces sketch, that the Pythons were Satanists. This shorter version was released on VHS in the UK by CBS/Fox in 1990 and later on DVD in the US by A&E in 2001, as part of their Monty Python Live box set.

== Sketches included ==
- Willam Tell
- The Merchant of Venice as performed by a herd of cows
- Silly Olympics
- Dennis Moore
- How Not To Be Seen
- Exploding Version of The Blue Danube
- Dennis Moore (again)
- World Forum/Communist Quiz
- The Philosophers' Football Match
- RAF Banter
- French Lecture on Sheep-Aircraft
- Conrad Poohs and His Dancing Teeth
- Architects Sketch
- How to Recognize a Mason
- The Ministry of Silly Walks
- Queen Victoria Handicap
- The Wacky Queen
- Working Class Playwright
- The Fish-Slapping Dance
- A man with a Stoat Through His Head
- Roy and Hank Spim – Mosquito hunters
- Sam Peckinpah's "Salad Days"
- Patient Abuse
- Hospital Run by RSM
- Come Back to My Place
- Homicidal Barber
- The Lumberjack Song
- Film Trailer
- Spam
- A man With a Tape Recorder up His Nose
- Musical Mice
- The Mouse Problem
- House Hunters
- Rival Documentaries
- Tchaikovsky Piano Concerto Escape Act
- Argument Clinic
- The Spanish Inquisition
- Bus Animation
- The Spanish Inquisition (again)
- And Then
- The Visitors
- Man-Powered Flight
- Raymond Luxury Yacht
- Television is Bad for Your Eyes
- Last Gumby announcement

== Deleted sequence ==
Originally, a brand new sketch featuring the Monty Python members and Steve Martin was to be included in the special. Filmed at Twickenham Studios on 3 September 1989, the sequence featured the Monty Python members dressed as school boys, asking Martin questions and taking notes. Although present at the recording, Graham Chapman did not perform in the sketch. The sequence was removed at the Pythons' request, as Terry Jones explained: "There was this new sketch which featured us and Steve Martin. Somebody had cobbled this thing together and was passing it off, saying it was written by John or whatever. When I read it I thought, 'This is just terrible, we can't do this'. So we arrived and Steve Martin was there at the film studios. We had to turn up to do it and I'm very glad that they cut it". Footage of the Pythons meeting up to record the sketch was aired in the US version of the Life of Python documentary.

The Pythons gave an alternative version of their appearance, which is featured in the special, in which Steve Martin briefly reveals that they are all in a cupboard. Chapman appears very pale and sallow; at the time the throat cancer that would kill him was advancing rapidly. This would be his last filmed appearance before his death on 4 October 1989, which coincidentally was the day before the 20th anniversary of the broadcast of the first episode of Monty Python's Flying Circus.

== Cast ==
- Graham Chapman
- John Cleese
- Terry Gilliam
- Eric Idle
- Terry Jones
- Michael Palin
- Steve Martin
- Carol Cleveland
- Connie Booth
- Basil Tang
- Marjorie Wilde
- The Fred Tomlinson Singers

== Credits ==
- Ian MacNaughton - Producer (original footage)
- John Howard Davies - Producer (original footage)
- Sue Vertue - Production Manager
- Charles Brand - Producer
- Anne James - Producer
- Martyn Hone - Editor
- John Lloyd - Editor
