= Python Night – 30 Years of Monty Python =

1999 British programmes

- Also known as: Python Night
- Created by: John Cleese; Terry Gilliam; Eric Idle; Terry Jones; Michael Palin
- Starring: John Cleese; Terry Gilliam; Eric Idle; Terry Jones; Michael Palin; Carol Cleveland
- Country of origin: United Kingdom
- Original language: English
- No. of episodes: 1

Production
- Running time: 220 minutes
- Production companies: BBC; A+E Networks; Python (Monty) Pictures

Original release
- Network: BBC 2
- Release: 9 October 1999

Related
- Monty Python Live at Aspen; Monty Python's Personal Best

Python Night was an evening of Monty Python-related programmes broadcast on BBC2 on 9 October 1999, to celebrate the 30th anniversary of the first broadcast of Monty Python's Flying Circus. It featured newly written sketches, three documentaries and a screening of Monty Python's Life of Brian.

Only the documentaries were screened in the United States, broadcast under the title The Life of Python on A&E Biography on 9 April 2000. Most of the evening's content was released in the United States later in 2000 on the first disc of the A&E DVD box set The Life of Python. In the UK many of the items were issued as bonus material on the BBC's 2004 Monty Python Live at Aspen DVD.

== Summary ==
- Introduction – After a cameo from the Mouse Organist, John Cleese tries to introduce the show. While he has a big rant about the 'bloody BBC', Luigi Vercotti shows up, shocks Cleese and threatens him to do Sainsbury commercials. Furthermore, Cleese suffers from the lack of budget at BBC2 (the lights go out), gets covered in blood and interrupted by Peter Sissons.
- It's...The Monty Python Story – A documentary hosted by Eddie Izzard about the History of Monty Python, from their early lives and careers through the Flying Circus and movies to Graham Chapman's death and the question of another reunion. Features interviews with David Frost, Frank Skinner, Robin Williams, Kevin Kline, Trey Parker and Matt Stone.
- Carol Cleveland clears up Python's "sexist" behaviour and introduces a focus group made up of several people (most of them played by the Pythons) including the Gumbys, an out-of-focus group of women and Gandhi.
- Mindless Violence – M-PY-THON Sports presents a collection of clips of sporting accidents.
- Mindful Violence – An animation by Terry Gilliam (his first since Monty Python's The Meaning of Life) in which a Buddhist kills chickens through multiplication.
- Pythonland – As a wish granted by a fairy (Eddie Izzard) to a bunch of pepperpots, Michael Palin hosts a travel documentary in which he visits places where Python sketches were filmed, such as The Fish-Slapping Dance, where the Ministry of Silly Walks started and Bicycle Repairman. The documentary ends with Palin trying to recreate the first "It's" man appearance by walking into the water, but he does not seem to come back up.
- Talking Apes – A parody of Mastermind is watched on television by three apes – one rants about the uselessness of sending apes human products like televisions but the other apes insist that they watch in case another 30 years later special airs.
- BBC? – The BBC2 announcers, tired of being second best, change the station's name to BBC1.
- The Gumbys introduce a screening of Monty Python's Life of Brian.
- The REAL Monty Python – Eric Idle gives a biography about the "real" Monty Python who started the comedy troupe before the other members turned on him.
- A succession of celebrities pay tribute to Monty Python, including Jeremy Paxman, Kevin Kline, Dame Edna Everage, Robin Williams, Melinda Messenger, Thora Hird, Michael Parkinson, Phil Collins, Hugh Laurie, Gary Lineker, Roger Moore and finally Dawn French, who is interrupted by archive footage of Graham Chapman as the Colonel.
- May Day 1971 – While searching through the trash behind BBC2 studios, Ken Shabby and John Cleese unearth a lost sketch contributed from a British May Day special (with a newly recorded audio track). Afterwards, Cleese accompanies Shabby back to his place.
- The Dead Friend Sketch – South Park creators Trey Parker and Matt Stone screen a tribute to Monty Python. The sketch is a thorough remake of the Dead Parrot sketch, with Eric Cartman as Mr. Praline, Kyle Broflovski as the shopkeeper and Kenny McCormick as the parrot. The sketch is interrupted by a giant cut out of Terry Gilliam picking up Cartman and the Python foot crushing everything. When Parker and Stone come back, they reveal that they have kidnapped Terry Gilliam's mother, Beatrice, in hopes to use her DNA to make Gilliam clones to work for them. Three policemen then announce the kidnapping of Gilliam's mother and ask for help.
- From Spam to Sperm – Monty Python's Greatest Hits – Pop rocker Meat Loaf hosts a documentary detailing the inspiration for the songs of Monty Python such as The Lumberjack Song, Eric the Half a Bee and Always Look on the Bright Side of Life. The documentary also discusses their albums and world sketch tours. Features interviews with Flying Circus extra Mark Brown, music producer Andre Jacquemin, Steve Martin, Gary Lineker, Meaning of Life child actor David Pickering and choreographer Arlene Phillips.
- Peter Sissons Interview – After being advertised all night, Peter Sissons finally sits down with the surviving Monty Python members. After introducing all five members, the interview ends.
- Closing Bits – The Gumbys wander off and the BBC announces it is closing. Forever.

== Origins ==
After the success of their Aspen appearance in 1998, the group discussed doing something for the 30th anniversary. At one point there was a stage show planned, but some members were uneasy about the idea and felt that Eric Idle's agent had done a poor job of preparations. By the time of the 30th anniversary in 1999, it was decided to produce a TV special with new material, which most of the group agreed on. Idle, in rebuttal was not keen on doing new material, and did not participate in it. As a result, his only contributions were filmed in Los Angeles and Eddie Izzard replaced him in group scenes with the other Pythons.

== Group reaction ==
The group were divided on the merits of the new material. Idle was scathing about the new sketches the other four members had filmed, while Cleese thought they were very funny but complained that the BBC did too little promotion for the programme. Overall the group felt that, though the material wasn't their strongest, it held a nostalgic quality because almost everyone from Flying Circus was working on the programme. Terry Jones, who directed the new sketches, later showed regret for the fact that he was doing it for free and didn't get paid.

== Cast ==
- John Cleese
- Terry Gilliam
- Eric Idle
- Terry Jones
- Michael Palin
- Carol Cleveland
- Ian Davidson
- Eddie Izzard
- Ian MacNaughton
- Peter Sissons
- Trey Parker
- Matt Stone
- Beatrice Gilliam

== Credits ==
- John Cleese, Terry Gilliam, Eric Idle, Terry Jones, Michael Palin – Writers
- Terry Jones – Director
- Terry Gilliam – Special Animation
- Andre Jacquemin – Music
- Hazel Pethig – Costume Design
- Elaine Shepherd – Producer
- Clare Rudkin, Rosie Thomas – Art Directors
- Darren Phillips, Deborah Jarvis – Make-up Artists
- Mike Tucker – Visual Effects
- Martin Trevis – Sound
- Brian Sykes – Production Design
- John Rhodes – Director of Photography
