= Monty Python Live! =

Book on Monty Python live performances 1971-1980

- Cover of Monty Python Live! hardback, 2009
- Editor: Eric Idle
- Authors: Graham Chapman; John Cleese; Terry Gilliam; Eric Idle; Terry Jones; Michael Palin
- Language: English
- Genre: Humour
- Publisher: Simon & Schuster
- Publication date: 1 October 2009
- Publication place: United Kingdom
- English publication date: Print (hardcover)
- ISBN: 978-1-84737-723-4
- Preceded by: The Pythons Autobiography by The Pythons

Monty Python Live! is a book detailing the various live performances of the Monty Python team between 1971 and 1980.

Edited by Eric Idle, the book was released in 2009 as part of the team’s 40th anniversary celebrations and features recollections from team members John Cleese, Terry Gilliam, Eric Idle, Terry Jones and Michael Palin, alongside archive interviews with Graham Chapman. Also contributing are Python regulars Carol Cleveland and Neil Innes, promoter Tony Smith, US manager Nancy Lewis, biographer Kim Howard Johnson and also Carl Reiner.

The book also contains the script for the 1980 Hollywood Bowl shows (minus the animation and Neil Innes songs), alongside a selection of lesser performed sketches plus some new comedy pieces written specially for the book.

== Contents ==
- Foreplay by Eric Idle
- Pythons on the Road – An Oral History…
  Origins – 1971, The Lancaster Arts Festival, Coventry
  UK Tour – April–May 24, 1973, Monty Python’s First Farewell Tour
  Canada – Summer 1973, Monty Python’s First Farewell Tour of Canada
  London – March 1974, Monty Python Live at Drury Lane
  New York – April 14-May 2, 1976, Monty Python Live at City Center
  Hollywood – September 26–29, 1980, Monty Python Live at the Hollywood Bowl
- Monty Python Live at the Hollywood Bowl – Official Programme
- Monty Python Live at the Hollywood Bowl – Act I
  The Llama
  Gumby Flower Arranging
  Michelangelo and the Pope
  International Wrestling
  The Silly Olympics
  World Forum
  The Ministry of Silly Walks
  The Bruces
  Crunchy Frog
  Travel Agent
  Custard Pie
  Monty Python Live at the Hollywood Bowl – Act II
  Sit On My Face
  Camp Judges
  Albatross
  Nudge Nudge
  Pepperpots
  International Philosophy
  Never Be Rude to an Arab
  International Philosophy Part 2
  Argument
  I've Got Two Legs
  Four Yorkshiremen
  Fairy Tale
  Parrot
  Salvation Fuzz
  The Lumberjack Song
- In Their Own Words – the Pythons Recall the Touring Years
  John Cleese: What I Remember
  Michael Palin: What I Remember
  Terry Jones: What I Remember
  Eric Idle: What I Remember
  Graham Chapman: What He Remembered
  Terry Gilliam: What I Remember
  Neil Innes: What I Remember
  Carol Cleveland: What I Remember
  Carol Cleveland FAQ
  Python on Broadway
- How to be a Great Fucking Actor
- Occasionally Performed Pieces – Act III
  Anagrams
  Bee Keeper
  Children’s Story
  Butcher’s Shop
  Hungarian Phrase Book
  The Dirty Fork
  The Death of Mary, Queen of Scots
  Hearing Aid
  Ken Shabby
  Michael Miles Game Show
  Minister Falling to Pieces
  Secret Service
  Cocktail Bar
  Undertaker
  Blackmail
  Courtroom
  R.A.F. Banter
  Silly Election
- Book Credits by Stanley Baldwin
- Monty Python would like to thank…
- Spot the Difference
- At Booksellers Near You!

== Credits ==
- Writers – Graham Chapman, John Cleese, Terry Gilliam, Eric Idle, Terry Jones, Michael Palin
- Contributing writers – Carol Cleveland, Neil Innes, Tony Smith, Nancy Lewis, Kim Howard Johnson, Carl Reiner
- Editor – Eric Idle
- Art editor – Steve Kirwan
