= A Pocketful of Python =

Book series

- Covers of A Pocketful of Python Volumes 1-5 hardback, 1999-2002
- Editor: Geoffrey Strachan; John Cleese; Terry Gilliam; Eric Idle; Terry Jones; Michael Palin
- Authors: Graham Chapman; John Cleese; Terry Gilliam; Eric Idle; Terry Jones; Michael Palin
- Language: English
- Genre: Humour
- Publisher: Methuen
- Publication date: 4 November 1999 (Volumes 1 & 2); 5 October 2000 (Volumes 3 & 4); 14 November 2002 (Volume 5)
- Publication place: United Kingdom
- English publication date: Print (hardcover)
- ISBN: 0-413-73290-8
- Preceded by: The Fairly Incomplete & Rather Badly Illustrated Monty Python Song Book
- Followed by: The Pythons Autobiography by The Pythons

A Pocketful of Python is a series of five books by the Monty Python team, in which each of the surviving members selects their favourite material from the group’s TV series, films, records and books. The first two volumes, by Terry Jones and John Cleese, were released in 1999 as part of the team’s 30th anniversary celebrations. Two further volumes, by Terry Gilliam and Michael Palin, followed in 2000 while the final volume, by Eric Idle, was eventually released in 2002. Each team member’s volume includes a preface written by one of the other Pythons. In 2006 all five volumes were released as a single paperback edition, entitled The Very Best of Monty Python.

The concept of each Python choosing their favourite material was later revisited for the TV series Monty Python's Personal Best.

== Contents ==
=== Volume 1 – Picked by Terry Jones ===
- A Preface by the Other Terry
- Introduction
- The French Taunt King Arthur
- The Truth About Protestants
- The Lumberjack Song
- The Prodigal Son Returns
- The News for Parrots
- Rat Recipes
- What Have the Romans Ever Done or Us?
- A Page for Those Who Like Figures of Speech
- Find the Fish
- Albatross
- Our Theatre Critic Reviews “The Merchant of Venice” Performed by the Dairy Herd of Bad Toltz
- Madam Palm Writes
- Spam
- Constitutional Peasants
- Every Sperm Is Sacred
- The Undertaker Sketch
- Madame Palm Writes Again
- The Man Who Talks Entirely in Anagrams
- Chez Rat
- Banter
- The Oxfod Simplified Dictionary
- The Minister for Not Listening to People
- The Court Martial of Sapper Walters
- What the Stars Really Say
- The Galaxy Song
- Bibliography

=== Volume 2 – Picked by John Cleese ===
- A Preface by Michael Palin
- Eric the Half a Bee
- Anne Elk’s Theory
- The Official Medallic Commemoration of the History of Mankind
- Raymond Luxury Yacht
- African Notebook
- Consulting Jean-Paul Sartre
- We’re All Individuals
- The Python Panel
- Larch in Court
- Fear No Man!
- The Merchant Banker
- Johann What’s-His-Name
- The Last Supper
- The Royal Society for Putting Things on Top of Other Things
- Arthur ‘Two Sheds’ Jackson
- Word Association Football
- Norman Henderson’s Diary
- The Sacred Castle
- Spot the Species
- Documentary
- Chapel

=== Volume 3 – Picked by Terry Gilliam ===
- Introduction
- Join the BBC Today
- The Meaning of Life
- Careers Advice for Mr Anchovy
- The Adventures of Walter the Wallabee
- Brian in Gaol
- What to do on Meeting the Royal Family
- Gloria Pules & Luigi Vercotti Remember the Piranha Brothers
- Page 29
- The German Lumberjack Song
- Woody Words & Tinny Words
- The Storyteller
- Stan’s Right to Have Babies
- Sexcraft
- Why Accountancy is Not Boring
- The Prince in the Tower
- I’m So Worried
- A Preface by Eric Idle for People Who Have Mistakenly Opened This Book Upside Down and Back to Front

=== Volume 4 – Picked by Michael Palin ===
- A Preface by John Cleese
- Introduction
- All Things Dull & Ugly
- Stig O’Tracey Remembers the Piranha Brothers
- King Arthur Goes to See the Galahads
- Goats Corner
- The Healed Looney
- Egon Ronay’s Good People Guide
- The Cheese Shop
- Madame Palm Writes Yet Again
- The Problem with Spanish Holidays
- Port Shoem by the Speverend Rooner
- The Stratton Indicator
- Winner of the Longest Stage Direction Ever
- Middleword by E.F. God
- Isn’t it Awfully Nice to Have a Penis
- The All-England Summarize Proust Competition
- The Stratton Indicator
- The Architect Sketch
- Never Be Rude to an Arab
- The Martyrdom of St Brian
- Mr Creosote
- $tock Market Report
- Novel Writing Live from Dorchester
- The Knights Who Say ‘Ni’
- A Letter to Michael Palin From the Producer of Monty Python and the Holy Grail

=== Volume 5 – Picked by Eric Idle ===
- A Preface by Terry Jones
- About the Editor
- How to Talk to the Queen
- The Batley Ladies Townswomen’s Guild
- Children’s Page
- The Story of the Grail
- Spamelot!
- Oh What a Lovely Dog
- While You Were Out
- How it All Began – the Story of Brian
- Solly & Sarah
- Python Literary Guild
- The Hackenthorpe Book of Lies
- Some Highlights from Masturbators of History
- The Bruces Philosophers Song
- Chez Bruce
- Ashes to Ashes
- How to Walk Silly
- St Brian’s
- The Upper-Class Twit of the Year Show
- Kashmir
- Chaos Theory Made E-Z
- The Film Rights to This Page Are Still Available
- Once Upon a Time
- Mr Cheeky
- Always Look on the Bright Side of Life
- Foreword by the Late Graham Chapman

== Credits ==
- Writers - Graham Chapman, John Cleese, Terry Gilliam, Eric Idle, Terry Jones, Michael Palin
- Editors - Geoffrey Strachan, John Cleese, Terry Gilliam, Eric Idle, Terry Jones, Michael Palin
- Designers - Katy Hepburn, Alun Evans
