= Life of Python =

- VHS cover art
- Genre: Documentary
- Starring: John Cleese; Terry Gilliam; Eric Idle; Terry Jones; Michael Palin
- Countries of origin: United States; United Kingdom

Production
- Running time: 57 minutes (American version); 55 minutes (British version)
- Production company: Tiger Aspect Productions

Original release
- Network: Showtime (United States); BBC 1 (United Kingdom)
- Release: 16 March 1990

Life of Python is the name of two documentaries, both intended to mark 20 years of the Monty Python team in 1989, but broadcast the following year after the death of team member Graham Chapman on 4 October - the eve of the 20th anniversary.

== Synopsis ==
The documentaries take in many aspects of Python history. The pre-Flying Circus shows are covered, including The Frost Report, At Last The 1948 Show, Do Not Adjust Your Set and The Complete and Utter History of Britain. Other topics include the naming of the show, the dynamics of the writing sessions, the animations, attitudes to women, censorship and the team's surprise at their success in America.

== Cast ==
- John Cleese
- Terry Gilliam
- Eric Idle
- Terry Jones
- Michael Palin
- Dan Aykroyd
- Dudley Moore (American version only)
- Steve Martin
- Chevy Chase (American version only)
- Barry Took
- Carol Cleveland
- Jane Curtin (American version only)
- John Lloyd (British version only)
- Ben Elton (British version only)
- Stephen Fry (British version only)

== Background and production ==
Life of Python was produced by Tiger Television in collaboration with Devillier-Donegan Enterprises.

=== American version ===
- Mike Fox, Graham Smith, Carl Teitelbaum - Cameras
- Fraser Barber, Michael Lax - Sound
- Marnie Jung - Production Assistant
- Sue Vertue - Production Manager
- Ron Blythe - Editor
- Charles Brand - Executive Producer
- Michelle De Larrabeiti - Co-producer
- Mark Redhead - Producer/Director

=== British version ===
- Roger Chapman, Lawrence Gardner, Max Harrison, Phil Milliard, Carl Teitelbaum - Camera Assistants
- Marnie Jung - Production Assistant
- Sue Vertue - Production Manager
- Jason Hunt, Terry Hunt, Jim McBride - Electricians
- Fraser Barber, Michael Lax, David Welch - Sound
- Colin Martin - Dubbing Mixer
- Bill Ogden - VT Editor
- Mike Fox, Graham Smith, Paul Sommers - Cameramen
- Roya Salari - Assistant Editor
- Richard Monks - Dubbing Editor
- Martyn Hone - Film Editor
- Michelle De Larrabeiti - Associate Producer
- Charles Brand - Executive Producer
- Mark Redhead - Director
- Mark Chapman - Producer/Director

=== Differences between versions ===
There are many differences between the two documentaries. The American version opens with footage of the Pythons (minus Chapman) meeting up at Twickenham Studios in September 1989 dressed in school uniform, in preparation for the filming of a new sketch for Parrot Sketch Not Included, which was ultimately cut from broadcast. The British version omits this and instead opens with footage of Graham Chapman's memorial service in December 1989, including John Cleese's memorably irreverent eulogy, and closes the documentary with Eric Idle leading the congregation with a singalong of "Always Look on the Bright Side of Life". The British version is introduced and narrated by comedy producer John Lloyd, who had recently compiled the sketches for the Parrot Sketch Not Included special. The interviews with the five contributing Pythons are mostly different in both versions, with only the occasional overlap. Much of the differing content and choice of interviewees in the two versions is geared toward their respective US and UK audiences.

== Release ==
=== Broadcast ===
The American version was broadcast on the Showtime network on 16 March 1990, with the British version airing on the team's 21st anniversary on 5 October 1990, as part of the BBC's Omnibus documentary series.

=== Home media ===
The American version of the documentary was released on VHS in the UK by Palace Video in 1991.
