= Not the Messiah (He's a Very Naughty Boy) =

Oratorio by Eric Idle and John Du Prez

Not the Messiah (He's a Very Naughty Boy) is a comedic oratorio based on Monty Python's Life of Brian. It was written by former Monty Python cast member Eric Idle and collaborator John Du Prez, and commissioned by the Luminato festival.

Blu-ray release cover art

== Production ==
With the success of Spamalot, Eric Idle's musical retelling of Monty Python and the Holy Grail, Idle announced that he was giving Monty Python's Life of Brian a similar treatment. The oratorio, called Not the Messiah, was commissioned to be part of the Luminato arts festival in June 2007. It was written and scored by Idle and John Du Prez, who also worked with Idle on Spamalot. Not the Messiah is a spoof of Handel's oratorio Messiah. "If our [Life of] Brian was by Matthew then this is by John (but more John Lennon and John Du Prez). In other words, it isn't sketches at all, but recitative and songs and the occasional Nine Carol Service Reader."

The musical style jumps around, and Idle described it as "baroque 'n' roll". It is a pastiche, reflecting pop, Welsh hymns, country and western, doo-wop, hip hop, Broadway, Greek chorus, and Bob Dylan (in his mumbling, electric guitar and harmonica phase, solo-ed by Idle). "Hail to the Shoe" is sung in the style of Handel's Hallelujah Chorus from the Messiah oratorio. The final song is the sing-along "Always Look on the Bright Side of Life", reflecting the British Music Hall tradition, but originally written for the Life of Brian.

== Premiere ==
The oratorio had its world premiere in an hour-long performance at the Luminato festival in Toronto, Ontario, Canada, on 1 June 2007 in Roy Thomson Hall. It received its United States premiere on 1 July at Caramoor Center for Music and the Arts in Katonah, New York, during the International Music Festival. An expanded 90-minute version premiered at the Queensland Performing Arts Centre in Brisbane, Australia, on 5 December 2007. There were also performances of it at the Sydney Opera House, Civic Theatre, Auckland, and Perth Concert Hall during December. On 24 July 2008 a performance was given at the Wolf Trap National Park for the Performing Arts in Northern Virginia, followed by a performance in Philadelphia at the Mann Center for the Performing Arts on 12 August 2008.

At the premiere, Idle performed as a "baritone-ish" soloist and narrator as well as reprising some of his roles from the film, including Mr. Cheeky, a man in the crowd who asked if Mandy is a virgin, and the Lead Singer Crucifixee. The other soloists were Canadian bass-baritone Theodore Baerg, Canadian soprano Shannon Mercer (as Brian's lover Judith), American tenor Christopher Sieber (as Brian) and Canadian mezzo-soprano Jean Stilwell (as Brian's mother). Other active participants were the Toronto Symphony Orchestra, members of the Toronto Mendelssohn Choir, and four stolid and kilted bagpipers in British 19th-century army regalia (they were members of the 48th Highlanders of Canada Pipes and Drums).

The Toronto Symphony's involvement was no coincidence. Conductor Peter Oundjian is Idle's first cousin. "We've been talking for a long time," said Idle, "about wouldn't it be fun to do something with an orchestra."

== Recording ==
To commemorate the 40th anniversary of the original Monty Python television program, Idle, Michael Palin, Terry Jones and Terry Gilliam appeared in a remount of the full, 90-minute version of Not the Messiah at the Royal Albert Hall on 23 October 2009. In an interview excerpt within the making-of documentary The Road to the Albert Hall, included on the DVD as a bonus feature, Idle states that he personally invited the former Python members to join the cast "and all but one said yes, and I'm not going to mention names – Cleese, you bastard!"

It was produced by Geoff Foulkes and directed by Aubrey Powell. When interviewed about this production, Idle commented: "It is rare you get to be silly on a mass scale." Idle reprised his role, as did Shannon Mercer that of Judith, while the other soloists were William Ferguson as Brian, Rosalind Plowright as Mandy and Christopher Purves as Reg. The cast was backed by the BBC Symphony Orchestra and Chorus conducted by John du Prez. "You're the One" and "Always Look on the Bright Side of Life" included pipers from the Pipes of the Royal Scots Dragoon Guards. The special performance ended with Palin reprising his role as Pontius Pilate from the original movie. Palin segued into a performance of "The Lumberjack Song" accompanied by the other Pythons as well as Python regulars Carol Cleveland and Neil Innes, with former Python collaborator and record producer André Jacquemin and comedian Sanjeev Bhaskar among the chorus of Mounties. Costume design was by longtime Python collaborator Hazel Pethig.

It was recorded for television and distribution on DVD, and BBC Radio 3 also broadcast a recording of this performance on New Year's Day 2010.

== Programme ==
All songs by Eric Idle and John Du Prez, unless otherwise noted.

Introit: Overture

1. "The Liberty Bell" (John Philip Sousa, arr. Du Prez)
  - After the introductory march, Palin appears in drag as "Mrs. Betty Palin" to deliver the Prologue. Du Prez's rendition of Sousa's march does not appear on the soundtrack CD for the show, released later in 2010.

Part One: Apocalypso Now

1. "Chaos and Confusion!"
  - A parody of Shostakovich
2. "There Shall Be Monsters"
3. "O God You Are So Big"
  - A reference to a line from Monty Python's The Meaning of Life

Part Two: The Boy Next Door

1. "Mandy's Lament"
2. "Woe Woe Woe!"
  - A doo-wop type song, including a reference to the famous Flying Circus sketch Nudge Nudge.
3. "We Love Sheep"
  - A spoof of "And There Were Shepherds" and "All We Like Sheep Have Gone Astray" in Handel's Messiah.
  - Carol Cleveland appears here as the "Sheep Lady", with three puppet sheep.
4. "Spiritual"

Part Three: The Temptation of Brian

1. "Brian's Dream"
  - This song, which starts off as a slow ballad and develops as such, but ends with an American gospel pastiche in the same vein as the preceding "Spiritual", is featured on the soundtrack CD as "I Want to Change the World".
2. "What Have the Romans Ever Done For Us?"
3. "The People's Front of Judea"
  - A pastiche of a copla, a type of Spanish romantic folk song.
4. "I Want to Be a Girl" (Idle) – sung by Idle
5. "The Market Square"
6. "You're the One"
  - Orchestra is joined by a quartet of bagpipe players.
  - This song is musically similar to "Find Your Grail", from Spamalot.

Part Four: Baroque and Roll

- This section starts with a re-appearance of Palin in drag, as above.
1. "Hail to the Shoe!"
  - Spoof of "Hallelujah" from Handel's Messiah, also contains "beatboxing" by Idle.
2. "Amourdeus" (Du Prez)
  - A movement of "operatic sex" written as a parody of a Mozart opera duet, such as "Papagena! Papagena!" in The Magic Flute.
3. "The Chosen One Has Woken!"
4. "When They Grow Up"
5. "Take Us Home"
  - Performed in the style of a Welsh miners' choir, featuring Terry Jones as a baritone soloist.
6. "The Chosen One" (cont.)
  - Terry Gilliam interrupts the song by appearing on stage, dressed elegantly in a black tie suit and carrying a folder; he opens it, says "I'm not!" [i.e. he is not an individual] and leaves. This song is titled "Not the Messiah" on the soundtrack CD.
7. "Individuals" (Idle)
  - Performed by Idle in a Bob Dylan impersonation/parody, complete with harmonica, guitar, sunglasses, and unintelligible lyrics.

Part Five: Miserere Loves Company

1. "Find Your Dream"
  - About two thirds into this song, which includes a mariachi pastiche, Neil Innes, Jones, Gilliam and Cleveland all appear on stage dressed as Mexicans, wearing ponchos and sombreros. (Cleveland also sports a pair of fake moustaches.) Toward the end of the number, Gilliam jumps on Cleveland and simulates an assault on her; he is restrained by the other two men, which results in both Cleveland and Gilliam falling over. As the song ends, Cleveland runs off stage embarrassedly, followed by the others.
2. "Arrested!"
3. "A Fair Day's Work" (Idle)
  - References "The Lumberjack Song"; performed by Idle
4. "The Final Song"
5. "Always Look on the Bright Side of Life" (Idle)
  - From the original film, has the audience singing along with the soloists, narrator, orchestra and bagpipe quartet.
  - After the song, Michael Palin (who performed earlier in this section, as Pilate), appears again in a tunic and a laurel wreath, declaring that he did not want to be involved at all in the celebratory event which just took place, and that he wanted to be a lumberjack instead. He strips off his tunic to reveal a grey-and-red checked shirt and workman's trousers, and moves onto the encore.
6. Encore: "The Lumberjack Song" (Michael Palin/Terry Jones [lyrics]; Palin/Jones/Fred Tomlinson [music]) – sung by Palin
  - "The Lumberjack Song" is not featured on the soundtrack CD because of copyright issues. (Idle's publisher Ocean Music does not own the publishing rights to the song.)

Finale

1. Reprise of The Liberty Bell.

== Royal Albert Hall cast ==
=== Vocal soloists ===
- Shannon Mercer (soprano) as narrator / Judith
- Rosalind Plowright (mezzo-soprano) as narrator (Part One) / Mandy
- William Ferguson (tenor) as narrator (Part One) / Brian
- Christopher Purves (bass-baritone) as narrator / Reg / Biggus Dickus
- Eric Idle (baritone, credited as "baritonish") as himself / narrator / Stan (Loretta) / Bob Dylan / Mountie / Mr. Cheeky

=== Special guests ===
- Michael Palin as Mrs. Betty Palin / Nisus Wettus / Pontius Pilate / the Lumberjack
- Terry Gilliam as himself ("Not an individual") / Mexican dancer / Mountie
- Terry Jones as Welsh miner / Mexican dancer / Mountie
- Carol Cleveland as sheep lady / Mexican dancer / the Lumberjack's best girl
- Neil Innes as Mexican dancer / Mountie
- Sanjeev Bhaskar as Mountie
- André Jacquemin as Mountie
- John Altman as Mountie

=== Music performers ===
- BBC Symphony Orchestra and Chorus, conducted by John Du Prez
- Pipers of the Royal Scots Dragoon Guards
- Elizabeth Burley – Piano
- Janet Simpson – Harpsichord and chamber organ
- Malcolm Hicks – Organ
- John Parricelli – Acoustic guitar
- Ray Russell – Electric guitar
- Steve Pearce – Bass guitar
- Ian Watson – Accordion
- Raplh Salmins – Drum kit

== DVD release ==
DVD and Blu-ray versions of the Royal Albert Hall show were released on 8 June 2010 in the United States, September 2010 in Australia and on 14 June 2010 in the United Kingdom and Germany.
