= An Evening Without Monty Python =

Play

An Evening Without Monty Python was a limited play that paid tribute to 40 years of Monty Python's Flying Circus and the publication of the book Monty Python Live!. The show was presented by West Beth Entertainment and co-directed by Eric Idle (one of the original cast members of Monty Python) and B.T. McNicholl. The show played in Los Angeles at Ricardo Montalbán Theatre from September 23 to October 4, 2009. It also played in New York City at The Town Hall from October 6 to October 10, 2009. The cast performed sketches and musical numbers created by the original cast members of Monty Python's Flying Circus.

== Cast ==
- Jeff B. Davis
- Jane Leeves
- Alan Tudyk
- Rick Holmes
- Jim Piddock

== Crew ==
- Music by: John Du Prez
- Costumes: Ann Closs-Farley
- Choreography: Peggy Hickey
- Lighting: Jen Schriever
- Sound: Dennis Moody
