= Patient Abuse =

Sketch written by Graham Chapman and Douglas Adams

"Patient Abuse" is a sketch from the final episode of Monty Python's Flying Circus, "Party Political Broadcast". The sketch is among the few not entirely written by members of Monty Python, and is notable for its considerable amount of black humour. It was co-written by Python Graham Chapman and his friend Douglas Adams, later known for creating The Hitchhiker's Guide to the Galaxy. Mind-boggling bureaucracy is a recurring comic theme of Adams' work.

== Outline ==
The sketch is set in a doctor's office. A man (Terry Jones) rushes in, blood gushing from his stomach. The doctor (Graham Chapman), barely reacting to the blood, blandly asks what the problem is, to which the man responds that the nurse stabbed him. The doctor tells the man that he has to fill out paperwork before receiving any care. With his blood still spilling to the floor, the man attempts to fill out the paperwork, while the oblivious doctor complains about the difficulties of paperwork and bureaucracy. Straining to the floor, the man hands the doctor his blood-soaked paperwork, which the doctor proceeds to criticise ("Surely you know number four! It's from The Merchant of Venice, even I knew that!"). The sketch ends with the nurse (Carol Cleveland) coming in with a bloody sabre, implying that she has just stabbed the last waiting patient. The doctor and the nurse decide to "pop[…] out for a bit of lunch", leaving the dying patient with a second form and the promise of some morphine if he gets at least the questions about history right.
