= Monty Python Live =

Monty Python Live is a two-disc DVD set featuring three TV specials and a live concert film of the British comedy group Monty Python. The set includes:

- Monty Python Live at the Hollywood Bowl
- Parrot Sketch Not Included – 20 Years of Monty Python
- Monty Python Live at Aspen
- The first episode of Monty Python's Fliegender Zirkus
