= Rosalind Plowright =

English opera singer (born 1949)

Rosalind Plowright OBE
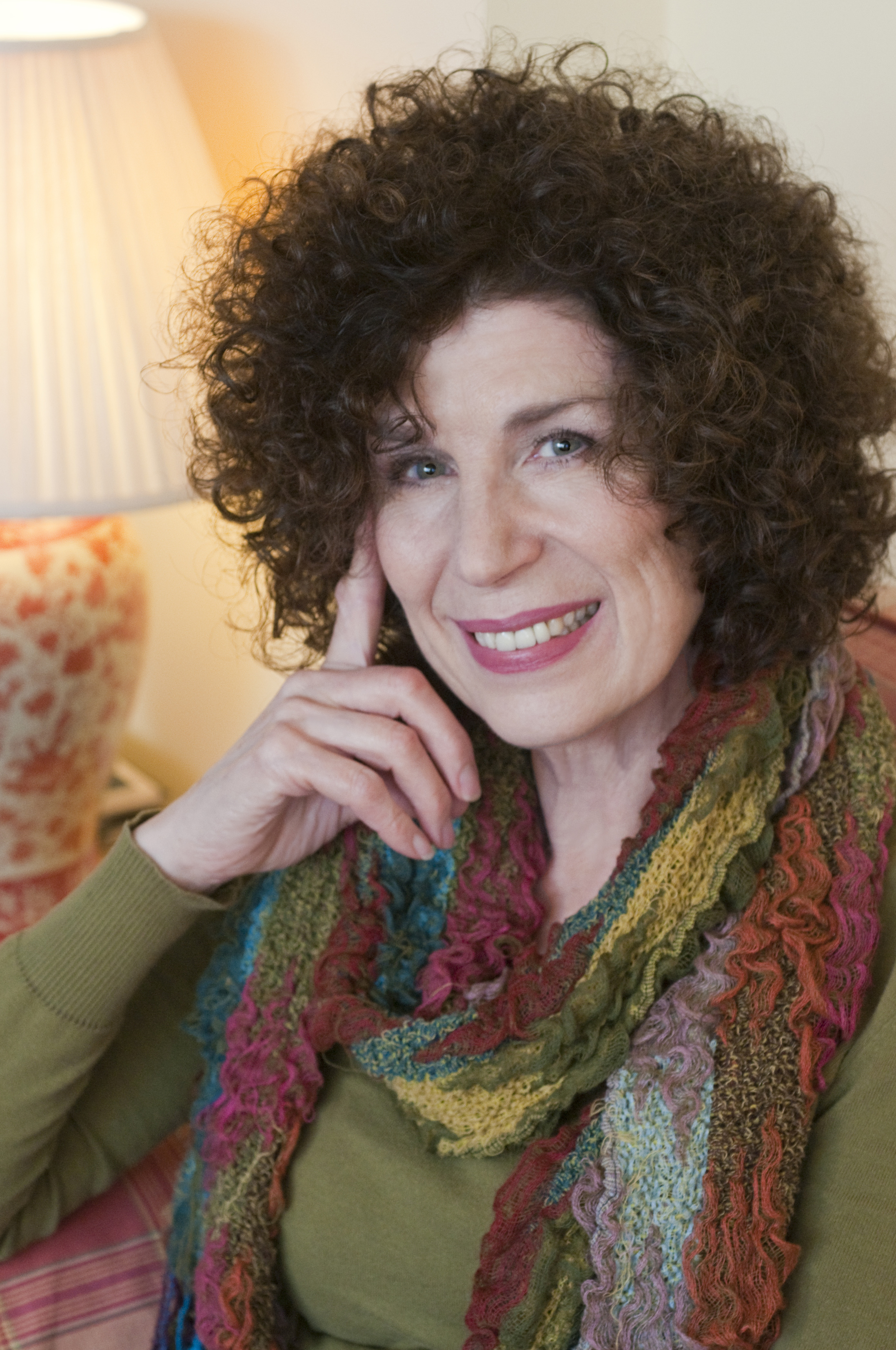
- Plowright in 2014
- Born: Rosalind Anne Plowright; 21 May 1949 (age 77); Worksop, Nottinghamshire, England
- Occupations: Actress, opera singer
- Years active: 1975–present

Rosalind Anne Plowright OBE (born 21 May 1949) is an English opera singer who spent much of her career as a soprano but in 1999 changed to the mezzo-soprano range.

== Life and career ==
Rosalind Plowright was born in Worksop, Nottinghamshire, England, and studied at the Royal Northern College of Music in Manchester and at the London Opera Centre.

=== Early career ===
Plowright made her professional debut with Glyndebourne Touring Opera in 1975 as Agathe in Der Freischütz. She sang Donna Elvira in Don Giovanni and the Countess in The Marriage of Figaro with the Glyndebourne Touring Opera in 1976 and 1977. Also in 1975, she appeared with both Welsh National Opera and Kent Opera before making her debut with English National Opera as the Page in Salome in 1976. She earned good notices in 1979 for her Fennimore in Frederick Delius's Fennimore and Gerda at London's Camden Festival. She then appeared with ENO in the roles of Miss Jessel in The Turn of the Screw, Desdemona in Otello, Elizabeth I in Donizetti's Maria Stuarda, Hélène in Verdi's Les vêpres siciliennes, Elisabeth de Valois in Don Carlos, and Tosca. Her recording of Elizabeth I in Donizetti's Maria Stuarda, with Janet Baker as Mary, Queen of Scots, brought her wider recognition.

=== International career ===
In 1980, Plowright sang Manon Lescaut at Torre del Lago, Aida and Ariadne in Frankfurt, Ariadne in Bern and Ortlinde at the Royal Opera House. Her American operatic début was in San Diego as Medora in the United States premiere of Verdi's Il corsaro. Her debut at La Scala came in 1983 when she sang Suor Angelica.

Since then, she has performed in major opera houses and companies around the world including Covent Garden, Hamburg (from 1982), Madrid (from 1982), Verona (from 1985), the Paris Opera (from 1987), Frankfurt, Munich, Berlin, Vienna State Opera, Athens, Rome (from 1990), The Metropolitan Opera, San Francisco Opera, Arena di Verona, Florence, La Fenice Venice, the Liceu Barcelona, Teatro Colón Buenos Aires and Municipal Theater of Santiago.

With José Carreras, she sang Andrea Chénier at Covent Garden and recorded La forza del destino for Deutsche Grammophon. With Plácido Domingo she has performed Il trovatore and Die Walküre at Covent Garden. With Luciano Pavarotti she performed Aida at Covent Garden and a gala concert for 25,000 at the Arena of Verona. She sang Cherubini's Medée at the Buxton Festival, Lyon, Lausanne, The Royal Opera House, Covent Garden and Athens. Plowright also performed Norma in Montpelier, Pittsburgh (1985), Lyon, Santiago di Chile, Paris (1987), and in Oviedo and Bonn (1988).

Among the many conductors with whom she has worked are Carlo Maria Giulini, Riccardo Muti, Claudio Abbado, Zubin Mehta, Giuseppe Sinopoli, Wolfgang Sawallisch, Bernard Haitink, Antonio Pappano, Michael Gielen, Sylvain Cambreling, Semyon Bychkov, Seiji Ozawa, Mark Elder, Roger Norrington and Giuseppe Patanè. She also gave recitals with Geoffrey Parsons in over 20 international festivals.

As an actress, Plowright has appeared as Grace Vosper in the BBC series The House of Eliott, and she played the part of Hermione Harefield in Anglia Television's The Man Who Made Husbands Jealous (1997), an adaptation of the Jilly Cooper novel of the same name.

As a theatre artist, Plowright has appeared in the new musical comedy Two's a Crowd.

In 1999 Plowright made her début as a mezzo-soprano as Amneris in Aida with Scottish Opera. In 2002 and 2003 she performed two of Cilea's operas with Opera Holland Park Adriana Lecouvreur and L'Arlesiana. In 2003 she made her Metropolitan Opera début as the Kostelnicka in Jenůfa. In the same year she returned to the Royal Opera House, Covent Garden, for Sweeney Todd as The Beggar Woman. In 2004 she performed her first Mother in Il Prigioniero in the Maggio Musicale in Firenze.

In 2004/5 Plowright performed Fricka in Das Rheingold and Die Walküre in the new production of Wagner's Ring at the Royal Opera House.

In the 2007–8 season Plowright returned to Covent Garden as Fricka in the Ring, appeared at the Metropolitan Opera as Gertrude in Hänsel und Gretel and at the Paris Opera as the Mother in Il prigioniero. In 2008-9 she performed her first Klytämnestra in Elektra.

In the 2010–11 season Plowright added the roles of Madame de Croissy in Dialogues des Carmelites and La Contessa de Coigny and Maddelon in Andrea Chenier in Stuttgart and in the Bregenz Festival. In the 2011–12 season, she added the roles of Mila's Mother in Osud in Stuttgart and Herodias Salome at Covent Garden. In 2012/13, she sang Der fliegende Holländer at La Scala, Milan and La zia Principessa in Suor Angelica in Seattle. In 2013/14 Herodias in Salome in Portland Opera, Oregon, Madame de Croissy in Dialogues des Carmélites in Théâtre des Champs-Élysées in Paris, and Mrs. Sedley in Peter Grimes for the Opera de Lyon and Theater an der Wien in Vienna (December 2015). In 2016 Plowright performed Klytämnestra in Keith Warner's new Elektra in Prague and later that year performed her first Old Baroness in Barber's Vanessa at the Wexford Festival. 2017 Saw her return to the Bayerische Staatsoper as La Contessa de Coigny in Andrea Chenier and she had her debut as Kabanicha in Katya Kabanova at the Berlin Staatsoper under Sir Simon Rattle. The year ended with the Opera North production of Six Little Greats where she performed Mila's Mother in Janáček's Osud and Mamma Lucia in Mascagni's Cavalleria Rusticana. In 2018, Plowright performed Mrs. Sedley in Peter Grimes in the Palau de les Arts, Valencia and made her Glyndebourne Festival debut as The Old Baroness in Vanessa in Keith Warner's new production. The year ended with her first Madame de la Haltiere in Jules Massenet's Cendrillon in Nantes and Angers.

== Awards ==
Rosalind Plowright was awarded an OBE in the 2007 Queen's Birthday Honours list for services to music.

She won first prize in the 7th International Singing Competition, Sofia and a SWET award (now Laurence Olivier Award) in 1979. She was awarded the Prix Fondation Fanny Heldy for her performance as Leonora in the 1984 recording of Verdi's Il trovatore with Domingo, Brigitte Fassbaender, Giorgio Zancanaro, Yevgeny Nesterenko and the Choir and Orchestra dell'Accademia Nazionale di Santa Cecilia under Carlo Maria Giulini. (Deutsche Grammophon code 423-858-2.) Also in 1984 she was nominated for her second Laurence Olivier Award. In 2007 she won a Grammy for the role of Gertrude in the Chandos recording of Hansel and Gretel.

== Other recordings ==
Other recordings include Maria Stuarda, Otello, Aida and Hänsel und Gretel, all for the Opera in English series for Chandos Records, Elijah also for Chandos, La vestale for Orfeo, Les contes d'Hoffmann for EMI, and Il trovatore, La forza del destino and Mahler's 2nd Symphony for Deutsche Grammophon. La Belle Dame sans Merci for Romeo Records – Release date 6 May 2014.

== Video recordings ==
Suor Angelica Suor Angelica, Il Trittico from La Scala, Milan. Leonora Il Trovatore from L'Arena di Verona. Gertrude Hänsel und Gretel from The Metropolitan Opera, La Contessa di Coigny / Madelon Andrea Chenier from the Bregenz Festival. In 2009, she was a soloist in Not the Messiah (He's a Very Naughty Boy) for the Royal Albert Hall performance. In 2014, she sang Mme de Croissy in Dialogues des Carmelites at the Théâtre des Champs-Élysées.

== Sources ==
- The Oxford Dictionary of Opera, by John Warrack and Ewan West (1992), 782 pages, ISBN 0-19-869164-5
- New Grove Dictionary of Opera (1992), article by Elizabeth Forbes, vol 3, p. 1037
- Who's Who in British Opera, ed. Nicky Adam (Scolar Press, 1993), ISBN 0 859 67 894 6
- J Anthony Kaye Husband
