= The Fairly Incomplete & Rather Badly Illustrated Monty Python Song Book =

Song book

- Cover of The Fairly Incomplete & Rather Badly Illustrated Monty Python Song Book hardback, 1994.
- Authors: Graham Chapman; John Cleese; Terry Gilliam; Eric Idle; Terry Jones; Michael Palin; Fred Tomlinson; Neil Innes; John Du Prez; Andre Jacquemin; Dave Howman; John Gould; Bob Leaper; Bill McGuffie
- Language: English
- Genre: Humour; Music
- Publisher: Methuen
- Publication date: 6 October 1994
- Publication place: United Kingdom
- English publication date: Print (hardcover)
- ISBN: 0-413-69000-8
- Preceded by: Monty Python's Flying Circus: Just the Words
- Followed by: A Pocketful of Python

The Fairly Incomplete & Rather Badly Illustrated Monty Python Song Book is a compendium of songs by Monty Python, released in 1994 on the occasion of their 25th anniversary. The book contains the lyrics and musical scores for songs from the group's Flying Circus TV series, albums and films. Also included are "The Ferret Song" and "Rhubarb Tart Song", which originate from I'm Sorry, I'll Read That Again before appearing on At Last The 1948 Show. The musical scores were edited by regular Python collaborator, John Du Prez.

Initial copies came with a free CD single, containing the Monty Python Sings versions of "Spam Song" and "Lumberjack Song".

== Contents ==
- How to Play the Piano
- A Foreword by Elvis Presley
- "Do What John?" (Eric Idle)
- How to Read the Music in This Book
- "Spam Song" (Michael Palin/Terry Jones/Fred Tomlinson)
- "O Lord Please Don’t Burn Us" (Graham Chapman/John Cleese/John Du Prez)
- "Lumberjack Song" (Michael Palin/Terry Jones/Fred Tomlinson)
- "Holzfällerliederhosen" (Michael Palin/Terry Jones/Fred Tomlinson)
- "Dennis Moore" (Graham Chapman/John Cleese)
- "The Ferret Song" (Graham Chapman/John Cleese/Bob Leaper)
- "Money Song" (Eric Idle/John Gould)
- "Bruces' Philosophers Song" (Eric Idle)
- "Muddy Knees" (Terry Jones)
- "Proust Song" (Fred Tomlinson)
- "Brave Sir Robin" (Eric Idle/Neil Innes)
- "Eric the Half a Bee" (Eric Idle/John Cleese)
- "Ya Di Bucketty" (Terry Jones/John Cleese)
- "Rhubarb Tart Song" (John Cleese)
- "Bing Tiddle Tiddle Bong" (Graham Chapman/Fred Tomlinson)
- "Yangtse Song" (Michael Palin/Terry Jones/Neil Innes)
- "Oliver Cromwell" (John Cleese/Frederic Chopin - arr. John Du Prez)
- "I Like Chinese" (Eric Idle)
- "Knights of the Round Table" (Graham Chapman/John Cleese/Neil Innes)
- Musical Quiz
- "Here Comes Another One" (Terry Jones)
- "Henry Kissinger" (Eric Idle)
- "The Background to History" (Neil Innes)
- "I've Got Two Legs" (Terry Gilliam)
- "Today" (Bill McGuffie)
- "I'm So Worried" (Terry Jones)
- "Never Be Rude to an Arab" (Terry Jones)
- "Finland" (Michael Palin)
- "All Things Dull and Ugly" (Eric Idle/Trad arr. John Du Prez)
- "Decomposing Composers" (Michael Palin)
- Afterword by Brigadier N.Q.T.F. (Mrs)
- "Anything Goes" (Terry Jones)
- "Medical Love Song" (Eric Idle/Graham Chapman/John Du Prez)
- "Traffic Lights" (Terry Jones)
- "Brian" (Michael Palin/Andre Jacquemin/Dave Howman)
- "Penis Song" (Eric Idle)
- Middleword by E.F. God
- "Always Look on the Bright Side of Life" (Eric Idle)
- "I Bet You They Won't Play This Song on the Radio" (Eric Idle)
- "Christmas in Heaven" (Eric Idle/Terry Jones)
- "Sit On My Face" (Eric Idle/Harry Parr Davies)
- "Accountancy Shanty" (Eric Idle/John Du Prez)
- "Every Sperm Is Sacred" (Michael Palin/Terry Jones/Andre Jacquemin/Dave Howman)
- "Jelusarem" (Graham Chapman/William Blake/Sir Hubert Parry)
- "The Meaning of Life" (Eric Idle/John Du Prez)
- "Galaxy Song" (Eric Idle/John Du Prez)

== Credits ==
- Music Editor - John Du Prez
- Designer - Gary Marsh
- Illustrations - Terry Gilliam, Gary Marsh, John Hurst
