= Monty Python Live at Aspen =

- Starring: John Cleese; Terry Gilliam; Eric Idle; Terry Jones; Michael Palin; Robert Klein
- Country of origin: United States

Production
- Running time: 58 minutes
- Production company: Python (Monty) Pictures

Original release
- Network: HBO
- Release: 21 March 1998

Related
- Parrot Sketch Not Included – 20 Years of Monty Python; Python Night – 30 Years of Monty Python

Monty Python Live at Aspen is a TV special featuring the surviving members of the Monty Python team; John Cleese, Terry Gilliam, Eric Idle, Terry Jones and Michael Palin, appearing on stage together for the first time since their Hollywood Bowl shows in 1980. Filmed on 7 March 1998 at the Wheeler Opera House in Colorado as part of The US Comedy Arts Festival, it features the five Pythons in an interview with host Robert Klein. The late Graham Chapman was also allegedly in attendance as his "ashes" were brought out in an urn with his portrait attached to the front, only to be knocked over by Terry Gilliam.

The Pythons initially appear with an uninvited Eddie Izzard, who is quickly made to leave the stage. The team and Klein then discuss their work and answer questions from fans on the internet. At the end of the evening they are presented with an American Film Institute Star Award, which is handed to John Cleese, who goes into a mock rant about how they never received any recognition when they were doing Monty Python, before the award is dropped into Chapman's urn. The show ends with Eric Idle leading a singalong of "Always Look on the Bright Side of Life".

The special was broadcast in the US on HBO on 21 March 1998. In the UK it was released on VHS in 1999 as part of the BBC box set The Best of Monty Python's Flying Circus. A DVD version of the set was later released in 2004. In the US the show was released on DVD in 2001 by A&E Home Entertainment as part of their Monty Python Live box set.

== Origins ==
In May 1997 the five surviving members of Monty Python regrouped for the first time since Graham Chapman's death in 1989. The meetings focused on Eric Idle's idea of a sequel to Monty Python and the Holy Grail in which they'd return as Knights of the Round Table, using audio outtakes of Graham Chapman's voice from album sessions to dub a performance out of him, with Arthur's ashes as the front. The rest of the group were enthusiastic, and even began writing material for it. The idea died soon, though, as Cleese was against the idea of doing a new film, partly because he remembered the disagreements the team had when writing The Meaning of Life, but also because any new film would miss Chapman's acting talents. The one-off reunion at Aspen led to plans for a 30th anniversary tour for the following year which, due to disagreements within the group, failed to materialise.

== Cast ==
- John Cleese
- Terry Gilliam
- Eric Idle
- Terry Jones
- Michael Palin
- Robert Klein
- Eddie Izzard
- Cathleen Summers

Also, Mary Steenburgen and Cheers cast members Ted Danson, Woody Harrelson, Rhea Perlman, John Ratzenberger and George Wendt are seen in the audience.

== Credits ==
- John Moffitt, Pat Tourk Lee, Stu Smiley – executive producers
- Nancy Kurshner – supervising producer
- Phil Savenick – co-producer
- Paul Miller – director
- Peter Crabbe – writer
