= Colin "Bomber" Harris vs Colin "Bomber" Harris =

Monty Python comedy sketch

"Colin 'Bomber' Harris vs Colin 'Bomber' Harris" is a Monty Python comedy sketch in which wrestler Colin Harris (Graham Chapman) fights himself, Colin Harris. As Colin fights himself, a commentator (John Cleese, with Michael Palin as MC in both versions) hastily reports the events.

Sir Arthur Harris was the Air Marshal of the RAF during the second World War. His heavy use of four engine bombers during the war earned him the nickname "Bomber Harris".

The routine dates back to Chapman's college days and he also performed it in the first episode of At Last The 1948 Show, broadcast in the UK on 15 February 1967. It was later adopted by the Pythons, who filmed a version for the second Monty Python's Fliegender Zirkus episode, broadcast in Germany on 18 December 1972. The routine also featured in many of the troupe's live shows and can be seen in the film of Monty Python Live at the Hollywood Bowl (1982). It was also cited in Monty Python's Personal Best as one of Graham Chapman's best sketches.

The sketch was originally titled "Half Nelson" when A Clump of Plinths, the Cambridge Footlights Revue of 1963 premiered at the York Festival, and it was written by Tony Buffery (later replaced with Graham Chapman). It was renamed "One-Man Wrestling" during the show's run on the West End.

== Harris holds ==
The sketch includes the following moves:

1. The "Hand Hold" in which Colin simultaneously attempts to grab his own hand while trying to fight it away, eventually failing. Cleese remarks, "He's going for the hand hold...he's got it."
2. Working on his "weak left knee".
3. Biting his own foot, which earns him a public warning from the referee and much ire from himself.
4. The "Double Overhead Nostril", where Colin brings his arm upwards, lowering his hand over his face and inserting his middle and index fingers into his nose.
5. Colin succeeds in gaining a fall by lying on the ground and bringing his legs up beside his head, locking his knees in his elbows; called the "Double Overhead" in the Fliegender Zirkus Version.
6. A "Strawberry whip", "Vanilla whip", and "Chocolate whip"—called "the flying Welshman" and "the half Egyptian" in the Fliegender Zirkus version—usually consisting of three forward somersaults while Colin elbows himself in the back of his neck.
7. "Colin's most famous hold, the one-neck-over-shoulder-Gerry Ford" (known as "The famous over-right-shoulder-Gerry Ford" in the City Center version) called the half-crab in the Fliegender Zirkus version, where Colin's right leg is brought over his shoulder, and he crawls along the ground in a pained manner with his remaining arm and leg. Colin manages to crawl to the ropes, and Cleese remarks that he was "lucky there".
8. Colin manages to catch himself by surprise by bringing his arms around his neck, his hands firmly pressing the ground in an attempt to pin; this move is known as the "Double Eydie Gormé" and is called "the neck pin" in the Fliegender Zirkus version. He is able to twist out of it.

== Match result ==
- The match ends with Colin hitting himself in the head with his forearm, effectively knocking himself out. He is declared the winner, but is announced to meet himself again in the coming finals.
