= Monty Python's Personal Best =

- Created by: John Cleese; Terry Gilliam; Eric Idle; Terry Jones; Michael Palin
- Starring: Graham Chapman; John Cleese; Terry Gilliam; Eric Idle; Terry Jones; Michael Palin
- Countries of origin: United Kingdom; United States
- No. of episodes: 6

Production
- Running time: 60 minutes per episode/360 minutes total

Original release
- Network: PBS
- Release: 22 February – 8 March 2006

Related
- Python Night – 30 Years of Monty Python

Monty Python's Personal Best is a miniseries of six one-hour specials, each showcasing the contributions of a particular Monty Python member. Produced by Python (Monty) Pictures Ltd., the series first aired on PBS stations between 22 February and 8 March 2006, although the Eric Idle and Michael Palin episodes were initially released by A&E on two Region 1 DVDs in 2005; the remaining episodes were released in late February 2006.

The five surviving members (Eric Idle, John Cleese, Terry Gilliam, Michael Palin and Terry Jones) were invited to select favourite sketches they wrote or starred in, mostly from the Monty Python's Flying Circus TV series plus a handful of sketches from Monty Python's Fliegender Zirkus and Monty Python Live at the Hollywood Bowl. All five collaborated on the sixth episode, a tribute to deceased Python Graham Chapman.

== Wraparound segments ==
With the exception of Graham Chapman's episode, each Personal Best segment features one or more wraparound sketches written by and starring the featured member:

- Eric Idle's Personal Best: Reporting live from the Bollywood Howl [sic], a newscaster (Eric Idle) introduces his interviews with several people about what they thought about Eric Idle, including Idle's mother and a former Nazi soldier living in South America (both also played by Idle). Throughout the segments, the reporter confuses the members of Python with The Beatles, an homage to Idle's work on All You Need Is Cash, a parody film featuring The Rutles.
- John Cleese's Personal Best: The show begins with a plaintext "memorial" to the "late" John Cleese. It then cuts to a fairytale starring the troupe ("The Princess with the Wooden Teeth" from Monty Python's Fliegender Zirkus), which then cuts to a poolside interview of a cranky, senile old man (Cleese) by Dayna Devon, a reporter. The supposedly 96-year-old Cleese usually answers her questions in the raunchiest manner possible, culminating in his "death" (by heart attack, apparently) at the end of the show.
- Terry Gilliam's Personal Best: The show begins with Gilliam claiming Monty Python's Flying Circus was originally to be his show alone, with animations only. The "viewer" flips a switch that turns on the lights to reveal that Gilliam and his workshop are really animations. General pandemonium ensues as the episode shows a vast collage of Gilliam's famously neurotic animations.
- Michael Palin's Personal Best: The show is a pseudo-documentary about fish-slapping, with Michael Palin playing the same character he played in the original sketch hosting the show. The sketches are supposedly added because the show originally introduced the world to fish-slapping. Michael Palin "travelling" to the original filming location of the Fish-Slapping Dance jokingly references his current popularity as a travel documentarian.
- Terry Jones' Personal Best: From his lavish home, Jones discusses how he conceived Monty Python as a showcase for his own considerable talents, how he reluctantly let the other members join and that 'Monty Python' is an anagram of 'Terry Jones'. Several sketches are personally (and often inaccurately) introduced by Jones.

== PBS airings ==
The series' American broadcast preceded the return of Monty Python's Flying Circus to syndication on PBS stations. Episodes were aired two at a time over three weeks:

- Eric Idle's Personal Best and Graham Chapman's Personal Best – 22 February 2006
- John Cleese's Personal Best and Terry Gilliam's Personal Best – 1 March 2006
- Michael Palin's Personal Best and Terry Jones' Personal Best – 8 March 2006

== Recurring sketches ==
- The fish-slapping dance sketch appears in every episode except Eric Idle's, while Conrad Pooh's Dancing Teeth appears twice.
- Three variations of "The Lumberjack Song" appear in the shows; the original version, the German-language version for Monty Python's Fliegender Zirkus, and the performance during Monty Python Live at the Hollywood Bowl.
