= The Pythons Autobiography by The Pythons =

Official autobiography of the Monty Python team

- Cover of The Pythons Autobiography by The Pythons hardback, 2003
- Editor: Bob McCabe
- Authors: Graham Chapman; John Cleese; Terry Gilliam; Eric Idle; Terry Jones; Michael Palin
- Language: English
- Genre: Autobiography
- Publisher: Orion
- Publication date: 15 September 2003
- Publication place: United Kingdom
- English publication date: Print (hardcover)
- ISBN: 0-75285-293-0
- Preceded by: A Pocketful of Python
- Followed by: Monty Python Live!

The Pythons Autobiography by The Pythons is the official autobiography of the Monty Python team, released in 2003. It covers the whole of Python history, from their childhoods all the way through to the 30th anniversary celebrations in 1999.

The book was edited by Bob McCabe from interviews held with John Cleese, Terry Gilliam, Eric Idle, Terry Jones and Michael Palin. Interspersed with these are archive interviews with Graham Chapman as well as new contributions from Chapman’s partner David Sherlock, his brother John, and sister-in-law Pam. The book also features excerpts from the personal diaries of Terry Jones and Michael Palin, alongside many previously unseen photographs from the team’s personal archives.

Originally released as a large format hardback, in the style of The Beatles Anthology book, it was later issued as a smaller paperback version. A 2-CD set of interviews recorded for the book was released simultaneously.

== Contents ==
- In Which The Pythons Meet The Pythons
  Terry Jones slags off the others
  Michael Palin blows the gaff on the Pythons
  Eric Idle bares his soul about the rest
  John Cleese talks about himself in relation to the others
  Graham Chapman speaks from beyond the void
  Terry Gilliam pisses on the Pythons
- In Which We Are Born
  Eric Idle
  Michael Palin
  John Cleese
  Terry Jones
  Graham Chapman
  Terry Gilliam
- In Which We Pretend To Grow Up
  Universities
  Life before the Circus
- ’It’s…’
  Monty Python’s Flying Circus
  And Now For Something Completely Different
  The giant has been stung
- In Which We All Become Starlets
  Monty Python and the Holy Grail
  Life of Brian
  The Bowl of Life
- The Meaning Of Death
- …And Beyond

== Credits ==
- Writers - Graham Chapman, John Cleese, Terry Gilliam, Eric Idle, Terry Jones, Michael Palin
- Contributing writers - David Sherlock, John Chapman, Pam Chapman
- Editor - Bob McCabe
- Designer - Harry Green
