= The Philosophers' Football Match =

Monty Python sketch

""International Philosophy", commonly referred to as the Philosophers' Football Match, is a Monty Python sketch depicting a football match in the Munich Olympiastadion between two teams of philosophers, one representing Greece and the other Germany. Starring in the sketch are Archimedes (John Cleese), Socrates (Eric Idle), Hegel (Graham Chapman), Nietzsche (Michael Palin), Marx (Terry Jones), and Kant (Terry Gilliam). Palin also provides the match television commentary.

The footage opens with the banner headline "International Philosophy", and Palin providing the narrative. Confucius is the referee and keeps times with an hourglass. St. Thomas Aquinas and St. Augustine (sporting haloes) serve as linesmen. The German manager is Martin Luther. The match is presented as a World Cup-style contest between famous Western philosophers. As play begins, the philosophers break from their proper football positions only to walk around on the pitch as if deeply pondering, and in some cases declaiming their theories. Franz Beckenbauer, the sole professional footballer among the participants and a "surprise inclusion" in the German team, appears perplexed by the conduct of the match.

Despite being set in the Olympiastadion, the sketch was instead filmed in Munich's Grünwalder Stadion. It originally featured in the second Monty Python's Fliegender Zirkus episode broadcast on 18 December 1972 and was regularly screened at the group's live shows, including Monty Python Live at the Hollywood Bowl (1982) and Monty Python Live (Mostly) (2014).

The Greek players, mostly with long grey beards and hair, play in flowing robes, while the Germans sport a variety of period dress including Victorian frock coats and breeches. "Nobby" Hegel carries a grey top hat, while Beckenbauer wears the red and white of the 1972 Bayern Munich football strip.

== Outcome ==
Nietzsche is booked with a caution for arguing with the referee, claiming he has "no free will". Confucius responds by saying: "Name go in book".

In the second half, with nothing being accomplished on the pitch other than mere contemplation, Karl Marx is noticed warming up vigorously on the German sidelines. Marx soon comes on to substitute Ludwig Wittgenstein, his energy appearing as an obvious game-changer. However, upon the restart, Marx starts meandering in deep thought like the rest.

With just over a minute of the match remaining, Archimedes cries out "Eureka!", takes the first kick of the ball and rushes towards the German goal. After several passes through a perplexed defence, Socrates scores the only goal of the match with a diving header off an otherwise goal-bound cross from Archimedes.

As the sketch closes, the Germans dispute the result. Through the words of the commentator, "Hegel is arguing that reality is merely an a priori adjunct of non-naturalistic ethics, Kant via the categorical imperative is holding that ontologically, it exists only in the imagination and Marx is claiming it was offside". The replay proves that, according to the offside rule, Socrates was indeed offside, but the sketch, nevertheless, closes with the Greeks, including "Chopper" Sophocles and captain Socrates, celebrating their win.

== Match details ==
10 September 1972
20:00 UTC+2

| Germany | 0–1 | Greece |
|---|---|---|
| | Report | Socrates 89' |

Olympiastadion, Munich
Referee: Confucius (China)

| GK | 1 | Gottfried Leibniz |
| DF | 2 | Immanuel Kant |
| DF | 3 | Georg "Nobby" Hegel (c) |
| DF | 4 | Arthur Schopenhauer |
| DF | 5 | Friedrich Schelling |
| MF | 6 | Franz Beckenbauer |
| MF | 7 | Karl Jaspers |
| FW | 8 | Friedrich Schlegel |
| FW | 9 | Ludwig Wittgenstein | | (substituted off) 88' |
| FW | 10 | Friedrich Nietzsche | Booked |
| FW | 11 | Martin Heidegger |
Substitutions:
| FW | 1 | Karl Marx | | (substituted on) 88' |
Manager:
Martin Luther

| GK | 1 | Plato |
| DF | 2 | Epictetus |
| DF | 3 | Aristotle |
| DF | 4 | "Chopper" Sophocles |
| DF | 5 | Empedocles of Acragas |
| DF | 8 | Heraclitus |
| MF | 6 | Plotinus |
| MF | 7 | Epicurus |
| FW | 9 | Democritus |
| FW | 10 | Socrates (c) |
| FW | 11 | Archimedes |

Assistant referees:
St. Augustine of Hippo (Algeria)
St. Thomas Aquinas (Italy)

== Philosophers Football Match 2010 ==
Inspired by the famous Monty Python sketch, and with the full backing of the surviving Pythons a tribute/replay of The Philosophers' Football Match was held at Wingate & Finchley's Harry Abrahams Stadium in Finchley, North London on 9 May 2010.

This tongue-in-cheek re-staging—on a real London pitch—of the original sketch, was the idea of The Philosophy Shop, a specialist provider of education and training for primary school children. The group works to enable Philosophy graduates at University level to conduct practical philosophy sessions for children aged 5 to 11 as part of a drive to boost their reasoning skills from their first days in the school environment.

Philosopher A. C. Grayling and former England Manager Graham Taylor were appointed as managers for the event, and players included comedians Mark Steel, Tony Hawks, Arthur Smith, and Ariane Sherine, as well as philosophers Julian Baggini, Nigel Warburton, Simon Glendinning, Stephen Law, Angie Hobbs, and Mark Vernon, plus other academics from universities nationwide. Match supporters included sociologist and BBC Radio 4's Thinking Allowed presenter Laurie Taylor, the BBC's John Humphrys, and educationalist and author Anthony Seldon.
