= Hazel Pethig =

British costume designer, known for work on Monty Python

Hazel Pethig (born 1944), also credited as Hazel Côté, is a costume designer for film and television. Her work on Monty Python's Flying Circus was described as "the definitive image of modern middle class Britain". She was nominated for a Best Costume Design TV BAFTA for her work on The Singing Detective (1988).

Pethig was brought up in Southend-On-Sea, Essex. She has described her upbringing as "bohemian… I was used to looking at things upside down".

== Monty Python’s Flying Circus ==
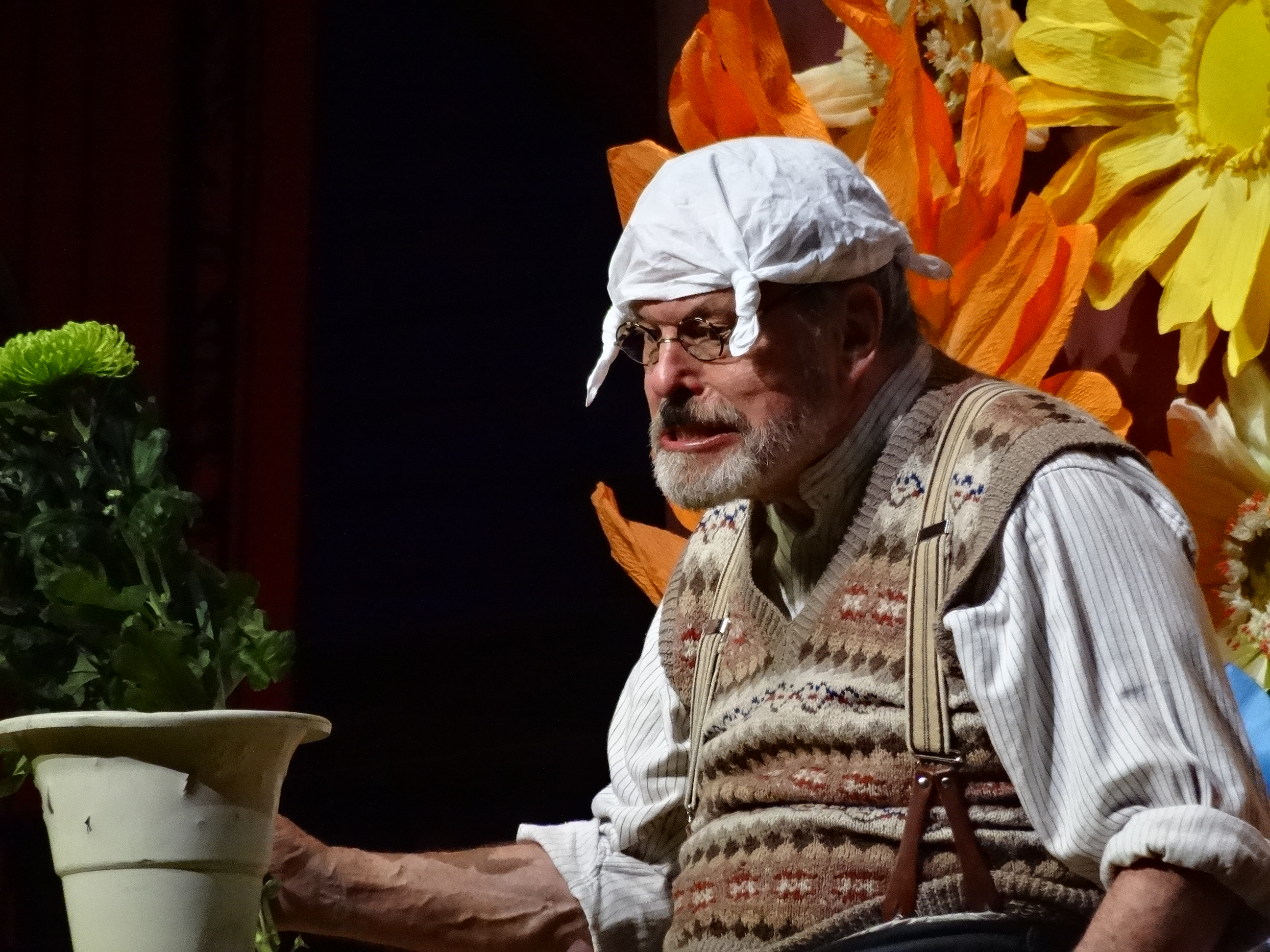
Terry Gilliam playing the character of Gumby, costume designed by Hazel Pethig.

In 1969, Pethig was assigned as costume designer to the BBC sketch show Monty Python’s Flying Circus, a surreal comedy ensemble featuring John Cleese, Graham Chapman, Eric Idle, Terry Jones, Michael Palin, Terry Gilliam and Carol Cleveland. Interviewed in 2013, Pethig recalled, "the reason I was given Python to do… was because some of the people at the BBC, perfectly good designers, wouldn’t have seen the humour… but I’d worked on Ken Dodd". Ken Dodd and the Diddymen was a children's puppet show featuring comedian Ken Dodd, that required improvised costumes and quick turnarounds – which Pethig considered good training for her work on Python.

Pethig compiled the Python costumes from the "massive costume store at the BBC", she carried a stock of fabric and padding in case she needed to improvise a costume, and purchased extra pieces when required, including city suits. The Pythons’ "Gumby" characters became famous for their gumboots and knotted handkerchiefs. For the first appearance of the character, Pethig dressed John Cleese in gumboots because it was raining, and produced an iconic costume that worn throughout the series by all the Pythons, and emulated by fans. She explained that they were also inspired by older people at the seaside in Southend, who kept their collars and ties on, and "just rolled their sleeves up".

Michael Palin described working with Pethig as "great… she wasn’t coming back to us from a background of a dogmatic 'costume design' world; she was very much her own person, she’s lovely, she had a nice, slightly dreamy, new age-y, way about her and she liked to explore the character".

== Python film projects ==
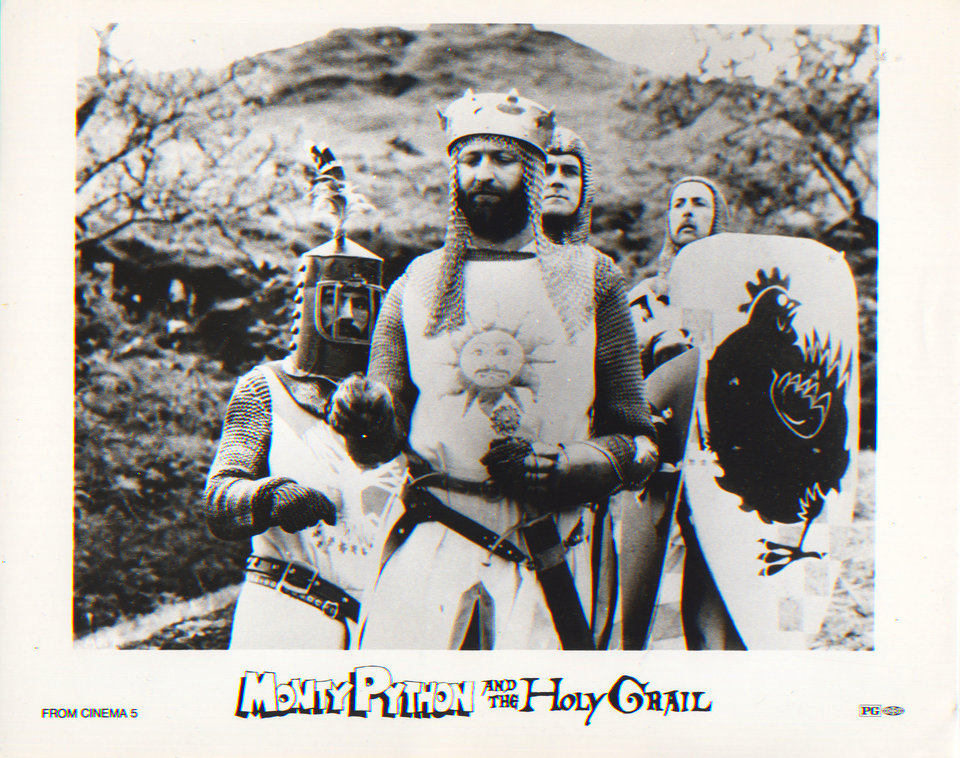
Graham Chapman and other Pythons wearing knitted chain mail costumes designed by Hazel Pethig, for Monty Python and the Holy Grail.

Following her work on the television series, Hazel Pethig was recruited to design costumes for the Pythons' film projects. Monty Python and the Holy Grail (1975) was a re-telling of the Arthurian legend, set in Medieval England. Terry Gilliam’s art direction created a “grimly realistic period setting”, and much of the film was shot on location in Scotland, to a very tight budget. Pethig used knitted garments to emulate chainmail and painted cloth to represent embroidery.

British comedy historian Justin Smith has observed, "visual continuity and period authenticity are also achieved to a remarkably high standard through Hazel Pethig’s thrifty but effective costume designs. The knights’ 'string-vest' chainmail in particular took on a convincingly weighty appearance when wet... Doubtless Hazel Pethig’s experience of working with the team throughout the television series benefited her contribution to the film". Recent critics have described Pethig’s costumes as "surprisingly good" for a low budget comedy film; "even if Camelot is a silly place, the costumes use correct medieval heraldry".

Terry Gilliam’s first solo film, Jabberwocky (1977), was filmed immediately after Holy Grail, with double the budget of the previous film. Gilliam wanted "a more complex representation of medieval life", and brought in Pethig and Charles Knode, to design costumes. Gilliam explained that Pethig could interpret his ideas and make them work: "I drew a cartoon … and she made it believeable, yet it still has the cartoon quality".

Pethig designed costumes for a number of other films featuring the Python members: The Strange Case of the End of Civilisation as We Know It (1977, written and starring John Cleese); Time Bandits (1981, directed by Terry Gilliam), and A Fish Called Wanda (1988, written, directed and starring John Cleese).

== Other BBC work ==
Alongside Monty Python, Pethig’s BBC comedy work included The Two Ronnies (1971), Milligan in Spring (1973) and Christmas Pantomime: Robin Hood (1973). She costumed The Planet of the Daleks serial for Doctor Who (1973).

Her BBC drama work included Brian Farker’s Steven (1974) and the six-episode series The Singing Detective (1986), directed by John Amiel, written by Dennis Potter, with Michael Gambon as Philip Marlow. Pethig was nominated for a BAFTA TV Craft award for Best Costume Design for The Singing Detective. Pethig also costumed Talking Heads (1988) by Alan Bennett.

== Teaching ==
Hazel Pethig has taught on the BA (Hons) Costume Interpretation course at Wimbledon School of Art.

== Appearances in pop culture ==
Pethig appeared in the artwork for Kate Bush's 2011 remix album Director’s Cut, sitting in a train carriage next to Monty Python’s Terry Jones.
