= World Forum/Communist Quiz =

Monty Python sketch

"World Forum/Communist Quiz" is a Monty Python sketch, which first aired in the 12th episode of the second season of Monty Python's Flying Circus on 15 December 1970. It featured four icons of Communist thought, namely Karl Marx, Vladimir Lenin, Ché Guevara and Mao Zedong being asked quiz questions.

== The sketch ==
A quiz show named "World Forum" is hosted by Eric Idle. He introduces his four guests, Karl Marx (played by Terry Jones), Vladimir Lenin (played by Peter Sellers on Flying Circus and John Cleese in Live at The Hollywood Bowl), Che Guevara (played by Spike Milligan on Flying Circus and Michael Palin in Live at the Hollywood Bowl) and Mao Zedong (played by William Tang in Flying Circus and by Terry Gilliam in Live at the Hollywood Bowl). Despite announcing this event as a "unique occasion in the history of television" the host then simply starts asking these historical figures trivial quiz questions. Marx is asked which English football team is nicknamed "The Hammers". He has obviously no idea (in reality it's West Ham United F.C.). Idle then asks Guevara a different question, namely in which year Coventry City FC last won the FA Cup? When Guevara also fails to give any answer at all Idle throws the question open to the other guests, but still receives no answer from any of then. Idle then says: "Well, I'm not surprised you didn't get that. It was in fact a trick question: Coventry City have never won the FA Cup." (Coventry City has since won the FA Cup.) With the scores all equal the second quiz round begins. Idle asks Lenin the name of the song by Teddy Johnson and Pearl Carr which won the Eurovision Song Contest 1959. Lenin has no clue, so Idle once again throws the question open. Unexpectedly Mao rings his buzzer and gives the correct answer: "Sing Little Birdie" (The song actually finished second.).

Idle then takes Marx to the special gift section of the quiz. He is able to win a beautiful lounge suite if he is able to answer all questions correctly. The host announces that Marx has chosen questions on the workers control of factories as his special subject. He asks Marx by what other development the industrial proletariat is conditioned, to which Marx correctly answers: "The development of the industrial bourgeoisie". Idle continues asking what kind of struggle the struggle of class against class is, to which Marx again correctly replies: "A political struggle". The final question however turns out to be another sports question, when Marx is asked who won the 1949 FA Cup Final? As Marx desperately tries to reply unrelated things like "the worker's control of the means of production" and "the struggle of the urban proletariat" the host informs him that he lost and that the correct answer was in fact the Wolverhampton Wanderers F.C. who beat Leicester City F.C., 3–1. The broadcast closes with stock footage of a crowd cheering over a winning goal during an association football match. A caption announces that "next week" the four leading heads of state of the Afro-Asian Nations will be playing against Bristol Rovers at Molineux.

== Notes about the sketch ==
Despite what the host says, the winning song of the 1959 Eurovision Song Contest was not "Sing Little Birdie", but Dutch singer Teddy Scholten's "Een Beetje".

On 16 May 1987, 17 years after this sketch was first broadcast, Coventry City F.C. did in fact win the 1987 FA Cup Final.

The questions asked of Marx in the special gift section of the quiz are all references to his book Communist Manifesto.

Later in the same Flying Circus episode, in which a sketch about the First Battle of Ypres is having difficulty getting started, the camera cuts to a quick shot of Marx and Guevara on the World Forum set, who are now kissing and embracing each other. At the end of the episode after the final credits roll, Marx & Guevara are seen in bed together.

== In other media ==
An audio version of the sketch can be heard on the extended US version of Another Monty Python Record (1971), with live recordings released on Monty Python Live at Drury Lane (1974) and Monty Python Live at City Center (1976).

The sketch was also featured in the 1982 concert film Monty Python Live at the Hollywood Bowl, where Eric Idle reprised his role as the quiz host, Terry Jones appears as Marx, and John Cleese appears as Lenin. The other roles were portrayed by different actors, though. Michael Palin played Guevara and Terry Gilliam in yellowface acted as Mao. While the sketch mostly follows the same pattern as in the TV broadcast there are some notable differences. Both references to the "FA Cup" are changed to the "English Football Cup". Idle's final question to the four guests is the name of Jerry Lee Lewis' biggest hit, to which Mao correctly answers "Great Balls of Fire", albeit in an Engrish accent. When Idle shows Marx the lounge suite he might win he adds that it is a "beautiful non-materialistic lounge suite." While Marx didn't say anything after losing in the TV sketch he does react to his loss here, by using the strong language: "Oh, shit!" Idle also pushes him away with the aggressive order: "Get out of here!", while someone off stage tosses Marx a teddy bear as a consolation prize. Idle then finishes the sketch by saying: "Well, no one leaves this show empty-handed, so we're gonna cut off his hands."

The original TV sketch was added to the compilation video Parrot Sketch Not Included - 20 Years of Monty Python (1989) and Monty Python's Flying Circus: Michael Palin's Personal Best.
