= Monty Python's Fliegender Zirkus =

- Created by: Graham Chapman; John Cleese; Terry Gilliam; Eric Idle; Terry Jones; Michael Palin
- Based on: Monty Python's Flying Circus by: Graham Chapman; John Cleese; Terry Gilliam; Eric Idle; Terry Jones; Michael Palin
- Written by: Graham Chapman; John Cleese; Terry Gilliam; Eric Idle; Terry Jones; Michael Palin
- Directed by: Ian MacNaughton
- Starring: Graham Chapman; John Cleese; Terry Gilliam; Eric Idle; Terry Jones; Michael Palin; Connie Booth; Carol Cleveland
- Country of origin: West Germany
- Original language: German
- No. of episodes: 2

Production
- Producers: Alfred Biolek, Thomas Woitkewitsch
- Production location: Bavaria
- Cinematography: Justus Pankau, Ernst Schmid; animation by Terry Gilliam
- Running time: 45 minutes
- Production companies: Westdeutscher Rundfunk; Python (Monty) Pictures; Bavaria Film

Original release
- Network: Deutsches Fernsehen (ARD)
- Release: 3 January – 18 December 1972

Monty Python's Fliegender Zirkus (Monty Python's Flying Circus) is a pair of 45-minute Monty Python German television comedy specials produced by WDR for West German television. The two episodes were respectively first broadcast in January and December 1972 and were shot entirely on film and mostly on location in Bavaria, with the first episode recorded in German and the second recorded in English and then dubbed into German.

== Production ==
While visiting the UK in the early 1970s, German entertainer and TV producer Alfred Biolek became aware of the Pythons and, excited by their innovative and absurd sketches, invited them to Germany in 1971 to write a special German episode of their Flying Circus show and to act in them. Despite mixed audience reception, a second episode was produced in 1972.

According to producer Biolek, the Pythons were initially somewhat reluctant to the idea of going to Germany to produce comedy for a German audience. Biolek had only seen a few shows, but he was impressed with the concept of the Flying Circus. Specifically, it stood out to him that they were both good comedians and good actors—a combination that Biolek rarely saw in the German comedy scene at the time. Biolek arranged to meet with the Pythons in the BBC's bar in London to convince them "with many arguments and even more gin and tonics" to come to Germany for a brief visit. Eric Idle has described the conception of the specials as "The Germans came to us and said 'Look, we haven't got a sense of humour, but we understand you do. Can we use yours?'" Terry Jones recalled Biolek's inquiry as an opportunity "to do silly things in Germany".

The Pythons agreed to visit Biolek in Munich in order to explore options for possible material, but did not want to commit at this point. During their visit, the troupe wanted to get a better understanding of German culture and humour. In fact, the visit, and the resulting two shows "can be viewed as a considered attempt to broaden the stereotypical picture of Germans" by the Pythons. Michael Palin also noted, "All I know is that it reversed all one's prejudices. Python has done very, very well in Germany, and the movies do extremely well. ... Whenever anyone says, you know, the Germans have no sense of humour, say no, hang on, hang on, they got Monty Python before a lot of other countries." During their visit to Germany, the Pythons attended the Oktoberfest and Olympiastadion in Munich, and also visited nearby Dachau concentration camp. The Pythons' visit to Germany in 1971 coincided with the widely celebrated 500th birthday of painter Albrecht Dürer, and the group's second visit with the highly anticipated 1972 Summer Olympics. Both events had an obvious impact on the material created by the Pythons for their first episode, including the Silly Olympics skit, and the Anita Ekberg Sings Albrecht Dürer skit, thus situating their style of humour in a local cultural context.

Monty Python's Fliegender Zirkus was produced by Biolek and translator Thomas Woitkewitsch in co-production with Westdeutscher Rundfunk. The first episode was written in English, and then translated by Woitkewitsch. However, translating humour within this transnational production—especially when based on idioms—was a general challenge, as Palin recalls.

Since none of the Pythons spoke German sufficiently, Woitkewitsch needed to provide them with phonetic transcriptions of the skits, which they then needed to learn by heart. Jones recalled that this posed a considerable challenge to the troupe; he also mentions that because of the rigorous repetition required in production, he was still able to recite the German version of "The Lumberjack Song" over 40 years later. Despite the coaching and re-iterative translation efforts, the Pythons' accents remained rather strong, and according to Woitkewitsch the overall pacing was off. While these language issues may have contributed to the first show's weak critical reception, Woitkewitsch suggests that they also lent it a "secret charm".

These troubles with troupe members' timing and German accents led to their recording the second episode in English; only John Cleese and Palin delivered their lines in German well enough to be easily understood by native speakers. The other Python performers all had very thick accents (particularly Jones), making them difficult to understand. In some cases the episode was broadcast with German subtitles.

The second episode was the final television show that Cleese recorded with the group, having already announced his decision to only commit to film and stage productions in future. The episode also featured Terry Gilliam taking more acting roles than before.

== Sketches ==
The "Colin "Bomber" Harris vs Colin "Bomber" Harris" and "Hearing Aid Shop" sketches in the second show had previously featured in At Last the 1948 Show.

Footage of the "Silly Olympics," "Little Red Riding Hood," "Flashers' Love Story," and "The Philosophers' Football Match" sketches from these German specials was regularly used to fill time between live stage performances, as seen in Monty Python Live at the Hollywood Bowl (the former two re-dubbed in English). "Silly Olympics" (minus the relay for the deaf part) and "The Philosophers' Football Match" were also used in the 2014 reunion shows at London's O2 Arena.

Several new sketches were written specifically for this show, including "William Tell", "Little Red Riding Hood," and "The Merchant of Venice" as performed by a herd of cows. Only "The Lumberjack Song" was translated from its original appearance on Monty Python's Flying Circus (Series 1, Episode 9), although "Ten Seconds of Sex" from the second show also appeared in Series 3, Episode 9 of Flying Circus around the same time.

Both Alfred Biolek and Thomas Woitkewitsch are featured in guest roles. German footballer Franz Beckenbauer makes an appearance in The Philosophers' Football Match skit. The first skit of the first episode also features Claudia Doren, then an announcer at Westdeutscher Rundfunk (WDR).

== Episodes ==
Title	Original release date
Blödeln für Deutschland (Fooling around for Germany)	3 January 1972
An Introduction to Monty Python By Frau Newsreader Claudia Doren; The Journey of The Olympic Flame; Monty Python's Guide to Albrecht Dürer; Anita Ekberg Sings Albrecht Dürer; "The Merchant of Venice" as performed by a herd of cows; Doctor Breeder; Flashers' Love Story (animated); Little Red Riding Hood; Silly Olympics; Stake Your Claim; The Lumberjack Song with The Austrian Border Police; The Bavarian Restaurant; Note: Edited versions of the "Little Red Riding Hood" and "Silly Olympics" sketches were dubbed into English for use in the Python stage shows. The "Flashers' Love Story" animated segment was also used. The Stake Your Claim sketch was included on the English language record Another Monty Python Record.
Blödeln auf die feine Englische Art (Fooling around in the fine English way)	18 December 1972
William Tell; Euro Sex Maniacs; The Sycophancy Show; Mouse Reserve/Fish Park; Chicken Mining; Heinrich Bonner, Fleabuster (animated); The Philosophers' Football Match – Greeks vs Germans, First Half; Colin "Bomber" Harris vs Colin "Bomber" Harris; The Philosophers' Football Match – Greeks vs Germans, Second Half; 10 Seconds of Sex; I Want A Hearing Aid; The Tale of Happy Valley (The Princess with The Wooden Teeth); Note: Both parts of "The Philosophers' Football Match" were included in the Python stage shows. An abridged version of "The Tale of Happy Valley" was recorded for the English language record Monty Python's Previous Record. "Colin 'Bomber' Harris vs Colin 'Bomber' Harris" and "I Want a Hearing Aid" were both originally performed on At Last the 1948 Show, which predated Monty Python.

== Reception ==
The first show received mixed reviews. Opinion surveys taken after the episode was broadcast revealed that 8% of the audience found the show to be very good, 15% found it to be very bad, and 43% found it to be good. Producer Biolek recalled that "This [the first show] was an absolute flop, it cannot be stated differently, as well as in terms of viewership and especially in terms of reviews." Biolek retrospectively believes that the German audience was not ready for Pythonesque humour, since it was more used to more traditional sketch comedy, by comedians such as Rudi Carrell and Heinz Erhardt. In fact, the producers did expect early on that especially the older parts of the German audience would not connect with the Pythons' style of humour.

Biolek attributes the production of the second show to Westdeutscher Rundfunk's general progressive stance towards entertainment production at the time, and specifically to the support of the head of the entertainment sector, Hannes Hoff.

== Alternative versions ==
The versions of the two episodes released on home video outside Germany differ from the versions aired on ARD. The ARD version of the first episode is missing the 6-minute "Bavarian Restaurant" sketch. The ARD version of the second episode trims some shots, mostly from 'The Tale of Happy Valley' sketch. On the other hand, the ARD version also features two sequences missing from the DVD version: 'Schwimmkurs mit Arthur Lustgarten' (Swimming Course with Arthur Lustgarten) and 'Eine wichtige Information für Raucher' (An Important Information for Smokers). Also, in the ARD version, Eric Idle's 'I Want A Hearing Aid' sketch has been moved to the end of the episode.

== Media ==
Guerilla Films released both episodes on a single VHS tape in 1998, available in either PAL or NTSC format. The American A&E Network used this release as the basis of their DVD releases of the same material, with the first episode being included on Monty Python Live and the second episode included on The Life of Python. (This arrangement resulted in the second episode being omitted from A&E's otherwise-complete 16-DVD box set of Monty Python's Flying Circus.)

The Australian DVD company Rainbow Entertainment also released both episodes on one DVD.

The Swiss publisher Haffmans released a hardbound book containing the scripts of both episodes, with introductions and essays by the German producers, in 1998.

Both episodes have been shown on the Paramount Comedy Channel in the UK and on PBS in the US in 2007. In December 2023 they were added to BritBox UK and ITVX.

The German DVD label Pidax has released the German DVD of the series in 2018. Episode 1 is featured in German language only; Episode 2 has German and English audio (with previously cut scenes being in English with German subtitles). The German TV-exclusive sketches of Episode 2, 'Schwimmkurs mit Arthur Lustgarten' and 'Eine wichtige Information für Raucher' are contained as separate bonus features; also, the German TV cut of 'The Tale of Happy Valley' sketch is available as a bonus feature.

A remastered Blu-ray of the two episodes, with bonus features, was released in June of 2026.

== Lost sketches ==
Several behind-the-scenes photos from the specials' production were published in the group's autobiography, some of which were from sketches cut from the specials:

- A version of the "Marriage Guidance Counsellor" sketch.
- A sketch involving a flute player (Graham Chapman) in front of a German sign.
- A version of the "Sir Edward Ross" sketch
- An alternate ending to the first special, in which two stage hands are carrying a giant sign that says ENDE off a huge field. Behind the sign is Terry Jones' singer character from the Albrecht Dürer sketch.
