= Monty Python Live at the Hollywood Bowl =

- British theatrical release poster
- Directed by: Live segments: Terry Hughes; Film segments: Ian MacNaughton
- Written by: Monty Python; Additional material: Tim Brooke-Taylor; Marty Feldman; Angus James; David Lipscomb
- Produced by: Terry Hughes
- Starring: Graham Chapman; John Cleese; Terry Gilliam; Eric Idle; Terry Jones; Michael Palin; Carol Cleveland; Neil Innes
- Music by: Ray Cooper; John Du Prez; Terry Gilliam; Eric Idle; Neil Innes; Terry Jones; Michael Palin; Fred Tomlinson
- Production companies: Python (Monty) Pictures; HandMade Films
- Distributed by: Columbia Pictures (United States); HandMade Films (United Kingdom)
- Release dates: 25 June 1982 (United States); 20 May 1983 (United Kingdom)
- Running time: 80 minutes
- Countries: United Kingdom; United States
- Language: English
- Box office: $327,958

Monty Python Live at the Hollywood Bowl is a 1982 concert comedy film directed by Terry Hughes (with the film segments by Ian MacNaughton) and starring the Monty Python comedy troupe (Graham Chapman, John Cleese, Terry Gilliam, Eric Idle, Terry Jones, and Michael Palin) as they perform many of their sketches at the Hollywood Bowl. The film also features Carol Cleveland in numerous supporting roles and Neil Innes performing songs. Also present for the shows and participating as an 'extra' was Python superfan Kim "Howard" Johnson.

The show also included filmed inserts which were mostly taken from two Monty Python specials, Monty Python's Fliegender Zirkus, which had been broadcast on German television in 1972. The performance was recorded on videotape during the show's four-day run starting September 26, 1980 and transferred to film. In the wake of Life of Brian's worldwide success, the Pythons originally planned to release a film consisting of the two German shows redubbed and re-edited, but this proved impractical, and so Hollywood Bowl was released instead.

Although it mostly contains sketches from the television series, the scripts and performers are not identical to those seen on television. The line-up also includes some sketches that predated Monty Python's Flying Circus, including the "Four Yorkshiremen sketch", which dated from 1967's At Last the 1948 Show.

== Sketches and songs ==
- "Sit on My Face" – A ribald parody of Gracie Fields' "Sing as We Go" from Monty Python's Contractual Obligation Album, performed by Cleese, Chapman, Gilliam and Jones in waiter outfits, sans trousers or underwear.
- "Colin 'Bomber' Harris" – After an introduction by Palin, Chapman is his own opponent in the wrestling ring as Cleese delivers play-by-play. This is a mime piece that dates back to Chapman's college days.
- "Never Be Rude to an Arab" – Jones performs an ostensible anti-racism song filled with demeaning epithets and is subsequently blown up. This sketch has two parts at different points in the show. In the first part, he's blown up and dragged offstage by Kim Johnson dressed as a large frog. In the second, he's blown up and dragged off by Johnson dressed as a Christmas tree. Also from Monty Python's Contractual Obligation Album.
- "The Last Supper" – Michelangelo (Idle) defends his creative first draft of The Last Supper painting against the objections of the Pope (Cleese). This sketch was originally written and performed by John Cleese for the first Amnesty benefit show A Poke in the Eye (With a Sharp Stick) in 1976, with Jonathan Lynn as Michelangelo. It is based on a historical incident involving the Renaissance painter Paolo Veronese.
- "Silly Olympics" – In a filmed section, athletes compete in absurd sporting events of the "Silly Olympiad," an event traditionally held every 3.7 years. The events include
  - The 100m for Runners with No Sense of Direction. On the starting gun, the runners run off in every single direction.
  - The 1,500m for the Deaf. They don't move because they can't hear the starting gun.
  - The 200m Freestyle for Non-Swimmers. At the starting whistle, they all jump into the water and immediately sink without surfacing, to which the commentator remarks that they'll return to the swimming when they start "fishing the corpses out".
  - The Marathon for Incontinents (people with extremely weak bladders). In this, runners fall away from the group every couple of meters to relieve themselves, giving others the lead. This also shows them all running into the men's room on the starting gun and running past a water table without any of them getting a drink.
  - The 3000m Steeplechase for People Who Think They're Chickens. In this, the runners are all doing chicken movements all over the course, and seem to be trying desperately to lay eggs on the hurdles.
  - The High Jump briefly features, with one of the Pythons, perhaps Cleese, dressed as a woman. He takes a run-up, then jumps ridiculously high over a wall and onto a high balcony.

The "Silly Olympics" sketch is from the first Monty Python's Fliegender Zirkus episode, dubbed into English. The original version also featured the events "1500m for people and their mothers" and "Hammer throw to America", whereas the latter acted as a link to the next sketch.

- "Bruces' Philosophers Song" – The university of Woolloomooloo's Philosophy Department throws cans of Foster's Lager at the audience and perform "The Philosophers' Song", accompanied by large Gilliam cutouts, detailing the drinking habits of history's great thinkers and project lyrics for the audience and viewers to sing along to. Eric Idle, Michael Palin, and Neil Innes play three Bruces. Originally from the second season of the TV series.
- "The Ministry of Silly Walks" – Palin has difficulty gaining funding for his (only slightly) silly walk. This also contains colour footage of the archival 'silly walks' film seen in the first episode of the second Python television series.
- "Camp Judges" – British judges (Idle and Palin) behave unconventionally outside the courtroom. From Monty Python's Flying Circus, series 2.
- "World Forum/Communist Quiz" – Historical socialist leaders Karl Marx (Jones), Lenin (Cleese), Che Guevara (Palin) and Mao Tse-tung (Gilliam) are asked British football trivia questions in a quiz show game hosted by Idle. From Monty Python's Flying Circus, series 2.
- "I'm the Urban Spaceman" – Neil Innes performs the Bonzo Dog Doo-Dah Band number as Carol Cleveland tap dances and constantly loses timing of the song. The song dates to 1968 and was performed in Do Not Adjust Your Set; this staging of it as a comedy dance routine previously appeared in Rutland Weekend Television with Lyn Ashley as the dancer.
- "Crunchy Frog" – Candymaker Jones answers to the police (Chapman and Gilliam, who vomits into his helmet - Gilliam filled his mouth with cold beef stew when he ran off stage during the scene) for his disgusting varieties of chocolates. From series 1.
- "Albatross" – Cleese, dressed as a waitress, attempts to vend a wandering albatross to audience member Jones. The sketch is stopped by the colonel (Chapman) for being too silly, who then orders Jones to report on stage for the next sketch. Originally performed during Season 1, although the film version uses adult language.
- "Nudge Nudge" – Idle pesters Jones with perplexing innuendo. Originally performed in the third episode of Monty Python.
- "International Philosophy" – In a filmed sequence, German philosophers take on Greek philosophers on a football field. This piece is from the second Monty Python's Fliegender Zirkus episode. It is shown in two parts, with "Four Yorkshiremen" in between each.
- "Four Yorkshiremen sketch" – Well-to-do Yorkshiremen (Palin, Idle, Chapman, and Jones) try to top one another's tales of their austere beginnings, each story getting more exaggerated and absurd. Originally written for At Last the 1948 Show.
- The Argument Sketch – Palin pays Cleese to disagree with him. Sketch interrupted by Gilliam suspended from wires performing "I've Got Two Legs." Cleese ends Gilliam's singing by shooting him with a shotgun. The sketch originates from the TV series, though Gilliam's song was not part of the TV sketch.
- "How Sweet to Be an Idiot" – Neil Innes sings an ode to lunacy. Also heard on the Monty Python Live at Drury Lane album.
- "Travel Agency" – Palin attempts to sell a package tour to Mr. Smoketoomuch (Idle), who has a speech impediment where he can't pronounce the letter ‘c’. He then goes on a very long rant about travel difficulties and will not stop, even as he is chased by an asylum orderly (Cleese) all about the stadium. He even interrupts the next sketch.
- "Comedy Lecture" – Chapman explains slapstick comedy fundamentals in an extremely highbrow manner as Palin, Gilliam, and Jones demonstrate, with Jones invariably becoming the jokes' victim. Originally from the Experimental Theatre Club's revue called Loitering with Intent. (This skit was actually done close to the intermission to give time for Jones to clean himself up, plus it includes Gilliam being forced to shove an entire banana into his mouth.)
- "Little Red Riding Hood" – In a filmed sequence, Cleese as Little Red Riding Hood endures a fractured retelling of the classic fairy tale. This piece is from the first Monty Python's Fliegender Zirkus episode, dubbed into English. (Some VHS versions of Hollywood Bowl omit this piece.)
- "Dead Bishop on the Landing" (aka "Salvation Fuzz") – A dead bishop on the landing disrupts a family's mealtime.
  - During the performance of this sketch, technical difficulties (a microphone starts feeding back) make Terry Jones lose his place (he temporarily looks up with a smirk on his face). Corpsing is rampant in this sketch; Eric Idle has trouble keeping a straight face while delivering his lines with an extraordinarily overwrought Yorkshire accent, which also causes Terry Jones to openly burst out laughing. At one point, Jones loses his 'Pepperpots' wig, which goes flying across the stage. Graham Chapman and Michael Palin slide across the stage to hide Jones as he replaces the wig, after which they all have trouble keeping a straight face (particularly Palin). This was always a difficult sketch to perform live—on other occasions, the 'Hand of God' (a large Gilliam-designed cut-out) fingered the wrong character. Idle describes the sketch as "shambolic" as he segues into:
- "The Lumberjack Song" – A rugged, masculine outdoorsman (Idle, as opposed to Palin in the original BBC series; Palin had also performed it in Monty Python's Fliegender Zirkus) unsettles the chorus by revealing his fondness for wearing women's clothes.

The following sketches from the Hollywood Bowl live show were cut from the film release: The Llama (opening sketch), Gumby Flower Arranging (second sketch); Mrs. Thing and Mrs. Entity (Pepperpots sketch) and, most surprisingly, the Dead Parrot sketch.

== Technical and release history ==
Monty Python Live at the Hollywood Bowl was shot on videotape on 26–29 September 1980. The show was originally recorded on a specially-made analogue high-definition video system called 'Image Vision' (an early HDTV system), provided by Image Transform from Universal City, California which output a 655 line, 24fps video signal. The show was edited on videotape and a 35mm negative was produced from the tape for the striking of theatrical prints.

In Europe, a 1.85:1 widescreen version was released on DVD in 2007. In North America, the film is available only as an older lesser-quality full-frame version, as part of a two-disc set titled Monty Python Live, which includes the 1998 retrospective Monty Python Live at Aspen and the first (German) episode of Monty Python's Fliegender Zirkus. The movie was also released as part of The Complete Monty Python's Flying Circus 16-Ton Megaset and as part of Almost Everything Ever in One Gloriously Fabulous Ludicrously Definitive Outrageously Luxurious Monty Python Boxset.

The movie was released in the UK by Handmade Films.

== Critical response ==
=== Box office ===
A film version of the Hollywood Bowl performances, with direction credited to Terry Hughes, was given a limited theatrical release in North America beginning on 25 June 1982. It grossed a total of US$327,958 during its theatrical run.

=== Reviews ===
Skip Sheffield of the Boca Raton News wrote, "Monty Python Live at the Hollywood Bowl is not exactly the pristine monument to the troupe's memory." Vincent Canby of The New York Times wrote, "It may be accurately described as Python lunacy of a purer grade."
