= The Fish-Slapping Dance =

Monty Python sketch

John Cleese and Michael Palin in the Monty Python sketch "The Fish-Slapping Dance"

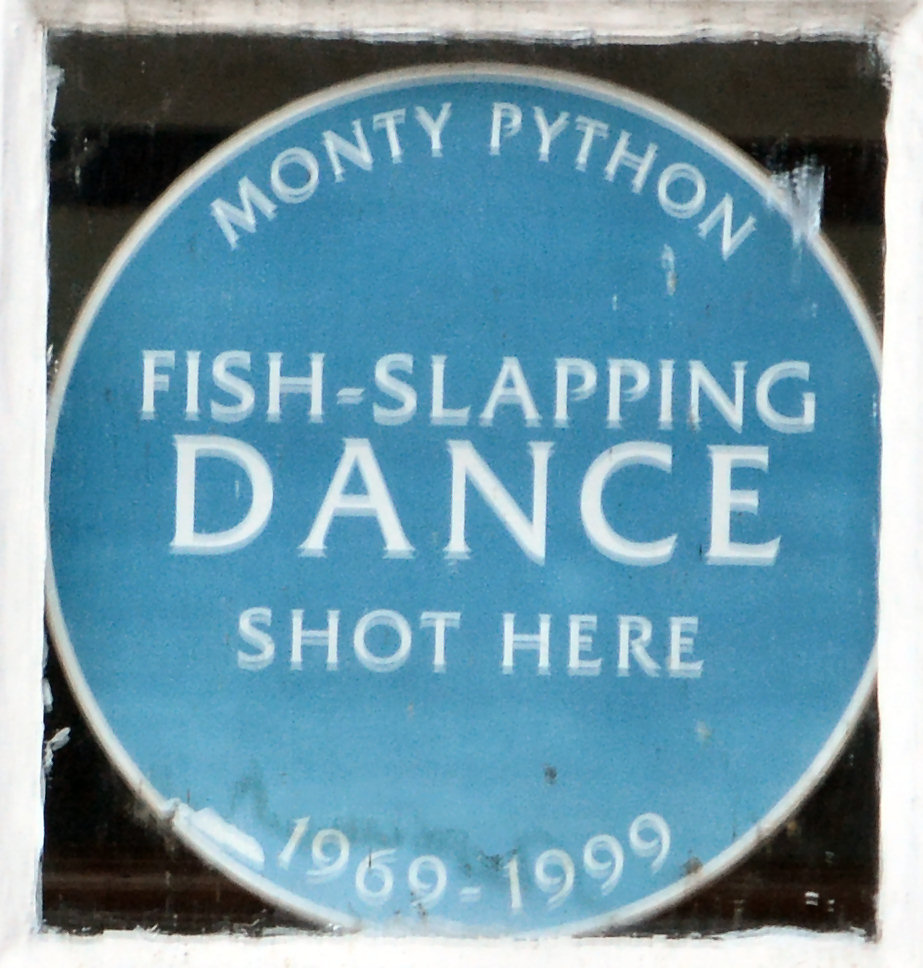
A blue plaque at Teddington Lock

The Fish-Slapping Dance is a comedy sketch written and performed by the Monty Python team. The sketch was originally recorded in 1971 for a pan-European May Day special titled Euroshow 71. In 1972 it was broadcast as part of episode two of series three of Monty Python's Flying Circus, which was titled "Mr & Mrs Brian Norris' Ford Popular".

== Overview ==
The sketch stars John Cleese and Michael Palin in safari outfits and pith helmets at the side of a lock (Teddington Lock in west London). Both are facing each other and light orchestral music plays while Palin dances towards Cleese, lightly slapping him in the face with two small pilchards, and returning to his starting spot. After Palin does this four times, he returns to his starting spot and stands still. In traditional British folk dancing, of which this is reminiscent, one would now expect the other dancer to repeat these steps. Instead, the music stops, Cleese reveals his fish – a much larger trout – and clobbers Palin on the head with it, knocking him into the water several feet below. Palin has discussed in various interviews how on rehearsal, the lock's chamber was filled (raising the water level); however, when the filming took place, the chamber was empty, and he had to dive a frightening height on his jump.

In the 1972 Python episode the scene then changes to a Terry Gilliam animation in which a cartoon-version of Palin's character sinks into the Canal until eaten by a giant German fish with a swastika on its body, then that fish is eaten by a bigger British one with a Royal Air Force roundel, and then that fish is eaten by an even bigger Chinese fish with a red star on its head.

The music is "Merrymakers Dance" from "Nell Gwyn suite" by British composer Sir Edward German (1862–1936).

The sketch is about 20 seconds long, but its situational non-verbal portrayal endears it to the audience. It remains one of Michael Palin's favourite routines on the show, and he made it the centrepiece of his own choice of sketches for his Monty Python's Personal Best miniseries episode. Palin has stated that the sketch summarizes concisely what Python is all about.

== In popular culture ==
- In the Monty Python-derived Broadway show Spamalot, written by Eric Idle, there is a song called "The Fisch Schlapping Song", sung by pseudo-Finnish people, before the historian abruptly ends the song. During the song, men and women dressed in stereotypical Scandinavian garb slap each other with fish, very similar to the original sketch.
- The Swedish comedy team Angne & Svullo did their own version of the fish slapping dance in one episode of their popular TV show in the late 1980s. The sketch starts the same as the original: first Angne slaps Svullo a few times in the face with small fish, then Svullo takes out a big fish and with a single blow knocks Angne into the water, laughing hysterically. However, in their version an old lady with an umbrella then comes by and starts hitting Svullo with her umbrella until he too falls into the water.
- In an interview, George Harrison's son, Dhani Harrison, said that the Fish-Slapping Dance was one of his father's favourite Monty Python sketches.
- The Australian satirical TV show The Chaser's War on Everything did a "British comedy sketch" that mainly parodied Monty Python. At one point, someone is slapped with a fish.
- In Jonah: A VeggieTales Movie, one of the "sins" of the Ninevites is that they slap people with fish, even slapping each other with fish (at which mention two Ninevites proceed to slap each other with increasingly huge fish, culminating with the second Ninevite crushing the first Ninevite with an impossibly large fish). The commentary track to the DVD confirms the inspiration for this to be the Monty Python sketch.
- On 14 March 2012, the Australian Broadcasting Corporation's comedy show Adam Hills in Gordon Street Tonight did a sketch where a 15-year-old audience member performed the Fish-Slapping Dance with John Cleese.
- On 27 December 2020, the online version of The Guardian brought a caricature of Boris Johnson's EU Trade Deal in the form of a fish slapping dance with credit to Monty Python.
- During Club Penguin's development, an animation about a ninja penguin was made, which was inspired by the Fish-Slapping Dance.
