= The Ministry of Silly Walks =

Monty Python sketch

John Cleese as a civil servant in the halls of the Ministry

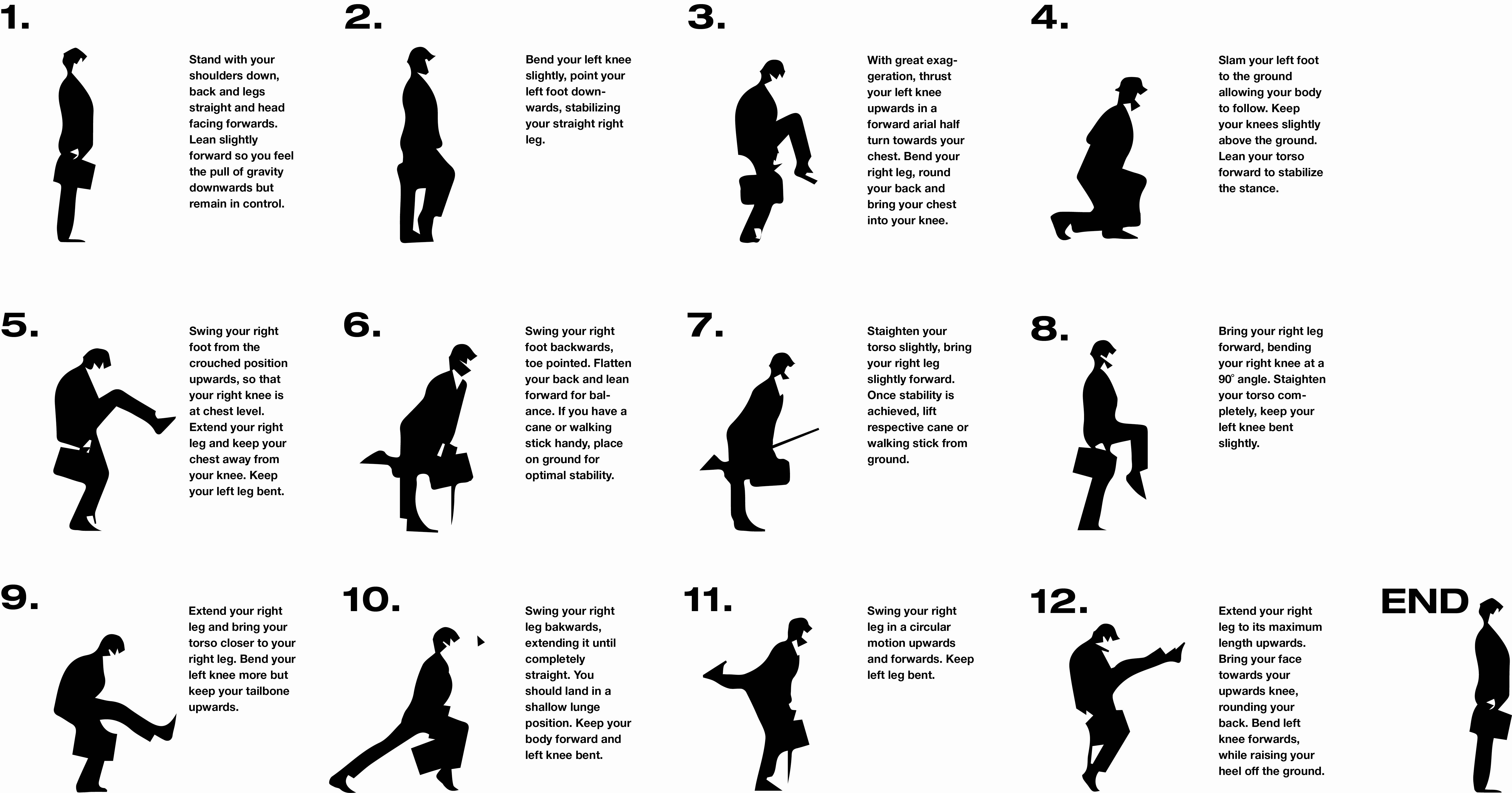
Typical silly walk gait with instructions.

"The Ministry of Silly Walks" is a sketch from the Monty Python comedy troupe's television show Monty Python's Flying Circus, series 2, episode 1, which is entitled "Face the Press". The episode first aired on 15 September 1970. A shortened version of the sketch was performed for Monty Python Live at the Hollywood Bowl.

A satire on bureaucratic inefficiency, the sketch involves John Cleese as a bowler-hatted civil servant in a fictitious British government ministry responsible for developing silly walks through grants. Cleese, throughout the sketch, walks in a variety of silly ways. It is these various silly walks, more than the dialogue, that have earned the sketch its popularity. Cleese has cited the physical comedy of Max Wall, probably in character as Professor Wallofski, as important to its conception.

Ben Beaumont-Thomas in The Guardian writes, "Cleese is utterly deadpan as he takes the stereotypical bowler-hatted political drone and ruthlessly skewers him. All the self-importance, bureaucratic inefficiency and laughable circuitousness of Whitehall is summed up in one balletic extension of his slender leg."

According to research, published in British Medical Journal a 'silly walk' would take about 2.5 times as much energy as normal walking.

== Sketch ==
The sketch as originally depicted in the series begins with John Cleese playing Mr Teabag, a civil servant who, after purchasing The Times from the newsagent in the previous sketch, walks through the streets of London (at the crossing of Thorpebank Road and Dunraven Road) in a very peculiar manner. He eventually arrives at his place of business: The Ministry of Silly Walks, on the northern end of Whitehall. In the hallway, he passes other employees all exhibiting their own silly walks before arriving at his office (the Hollywood Bowl performance omits this preamble). Once there, he finds Mr Putey (Michael Palin) waiting for him and apologizes for the delay, explaining that his walk has become particularly silly of late and it takes longer for him to reach his destination.

Putey explains that he has a silly walk he wishes to develop with grant money. He demonstrates his walk which, to Teabag, isn't particularly silly ("The right leg isn't silly at all, and the left leg merely does a forward aerial half-turn every alternate step."). He tells Putey that he does not believe the ministry can help him, as Putey's walk is not silly enough and funding is short. The government, he explains (whilst walking around his office in increasingly silly ways), is supposed to give equally to Defence, Social Security, Health, Housing, Education, and Silly Walks, but recently spent less on Silly Walks than on national defence. After a visit by his secretary Mrs Two-Lumps, Mr Teabag shows Mr Putey a film on silly walks. (The segment is a parody of early 20th-century cinema, with Michael Palin dressed up as Little Tich; this film is also shown as part of the Hollywood Bowl performance of the sketch.) After tossing the projector offstage, Teabag offers Putey a grant that will allow him to work on the Anglo-French Silly Walk, La Marche Futile (a parody of Concorde's Anglo-French development), which is then demonstrated by a man (Terry Jones) dressed in a mixture of stereotypical English and French outfits, with a sped-up version of "La Marseillaise" playing.

Mrs Two-Lumps, the minister's secretary, makes a brief appearance, bringing in coffee with full silly walk. As she enters, the cups fall all over the tray, completely spilling their contents. The minister looks at the tray, says "Thank you, lovely" and she exits again, taking the tray with her, complete with upended cups. In the Hollywood Bowl version, Carol Cleveland plays Mrs Two-Lumps, and spills some of the coffee on Cleese during the sketch.

As the years went by amid repeated requests to do the sketch, Cleese found it increasingly difficult to perform these walks. He would say, when told about a new Python tour, "I'm not doing silly walks." Accordingly, the sketch was not performed during Monty Python Live (Mostly), the troupe's 2014 reunion show. It was replaced by "The Silly Walks Song", which was performed by a group of (younger) dancers who mimicked Cleese's original walks while wearing bowler hats and carrying briefcases.

== Reception ==
In 2005, the sketch was chosen in a poll taken by Channel 4 in Britain as the 15th greatest comedy sketch of all time (and one of five Monty Python sketches in the top 50).

== Mobile game ==
In 2014, an official video game adaption of the sketch was released for Android and iOS. It features Cleese, as the minister of silly walks, leaving his office and walking through London. It takes the form of an endless runner game, except with an appropriately absurd walking animation. The game includes voice acting from John Cleese.

== References in popular culture ==
- In the 1988 Warhammer Fantasy Battle rulebook, Realm of Chaos: Slaves to Darkness, one of the possible mutations a creature might get is a "silly walk", which is considered widely by many to be a reference to this sketch, as early Warhammer products were considerably more comedic in tone, and contained many references to then-contemporary British culture.
- In the episode "Timeless Time" of BBC sitcom One Foot in the Grave, which aired in 1991, Victor Meldrew played by Richard Wilson (Scottish actor) develops a cramp in his leg while laying in bed. To try to relieve it, Victor stands up and walks around the bedroom in an exaggerated fashion. This leads Margaret, Victor's wife played by Annette Crosbie, to say "Here we go Ministry of Silly Walks."
- In the 1994 Beastie Boys "Sure Shot" music video, Adam Yauch demonstrates a Silly Walk step for Adam Horovitz. John Berry later reminisced of a teenage Yauch, "He was really into Monty Python, especially the Silly Walk skit."
- In 2000, an episode of Mission Hill, "Andy and Kevin Make a Friend (or One Bang for Two Brothers)", referenced the sketch when one of the characters attempts to impress a girl by showing how he does a "great silly walk" from the Ministry of Silly Walks.
- A reference is made to the Silly Walk in an episode of the WB's Gilmore Girls when Rory says "Please, don't walk away like that", and Dean responds with "Sorry, I'd do a silly walk, but I'm not feeling very John Cleese right now."
- In the video game Goldeneye 007, an image of a man doing John Cleese's silly walk can be seen on one of the computer monitors in the game.
- In an issue of The Simpsons Bongo Comic, when the British invade Springfield, it shows John Cleese doing the goosestep and labels him as "the Minister of Silly Walks".
- On an episode of The Chaser's War On Everything, Andrew Hansen and Chris Taylor do a sketch called "The Chaser's British Comedy Sketch", filled with various Monty Python cliches, which climaxes with Andrew screaming "I'm going to do something so totally bizarre it will be imitated verbatim by comedy nerds for decades to come!" He then does a silly walk, doing imitations of Pepperpots, until a 16-ton weight falls on his head.
- In November 2007, as the Eurostar duration between Brussels and London was reduced to 1 hour and 51 minutes, the "Ministry of Silly Walks" appeared in an ad campaign in Belgium. The adverts were all on building corners, showing two workers carrying a large glass pane walking towards the corner on one side. Walking towards them on the other side, a John Cleese look-alike performs a Silly Walk. The tagline read "Warning! London is just around the corner!".
- In the Season 6 episode of Futurama entitled "All the Presidents Heads", Dr. Zoidberg performs a silly walk.
- In the 25th anniversary reunion episode of I'm Sorry, I'll Read That Again, John Cleese consents to appear on the show on condition that he be allowed to do the Silly Walk; the other cast members are dubious about the comedic impact of doing the Walk on radio, but they ultimately give in after Cleese puts on a show of hurt feelings. Near the end of the show, Cleese presents the Silly Walk, rendered on radio as a series of loud, slow footsteps.
- In the video game Destroy All Humans! 2, if you read a hippie's mind in the Albion level, one of the thoughts is, "I hope I can get a job at the Ministry of Silly Walks" (This video game is known for spoofing popular culture of the decade in which it is set).
- In a standup comedy routine in Blue Collar Comedy Tour: One For the Road, Larry the Cable Guy, referring to strange people who go to Wal-Mart in the middle of the night, says that it "turns into Monty Python's Ministry of Silly Walks."
- In Improv Everywhere's 2010 MP3 experiment, participants were asked to walk in a silly manner. After the silly walk session was finished, 'Mark (the omnipotent voice from above)' stated: "Excellent silly walks. Those belong in the Ministry hall of fame".
- A segment in The Beano comic book featured Minnie the Minx as the "Minnie-ster of Silly Walks".
- In the Fawlty Towers episode "The Germans", Basil (John Cleese), after grandly announcing, "I'll do the funny walk", performs a goose step, reminiscent of a silly walk.
- In the second issue of Alan Moore and Kevin O'Neill's comic book The League of Extraordinary Gentlemen, Volume III: Century, the "Minister" can be seen performing the silly walk in the background in London, passing the League of Extraordinary Gentlemen.
- In the Czech city of Brno, a Silly Walk City March is held annually since 2012.
- The small town of Ørje, Norway found a way to spice up one of its crosswalks—pedestrians wishing to cross must do so using a silly walk. The town's mayor didn't seem to mind the silliness. "Clearly, one should listen to the authorities, but this kind of fun should be allowed", the mayor said. "You cannot just be square, right?"
- The 4 July 2016 issue of The New Yorker features a parody of the silly walk on its cover, a reference to Brexit, in which several men in the likeness of John Cleese's character do the silly walk off the edge of a cliff.
- The 22 January 2017 episode of Zondag met Lubach mentions Minister Jetta Klijnsma being a disabled politician from the Ministry of Silly Walks, so U.S. President Donald Trump can make fun of her.
- In the video game West of Loathing, there is an option for "stupid walking", which allows the player to "walk in silly ways". The entire game can be completed this way.
- In the video game Payday 2, the safe house butler Aldstone, voiced by John Cleese, has a rare chance of walking this way for a few seconds.
- On 28 October 2019, while celebrating the Ohi Day, a group of participants to the national military parade performed a silly walk as an anti-military demonstration in Nea Filadelfeia, Greece.
- The LaTeX package Sillypage was developed by Phelype H. Oleinik and Paulo R. M. Cereda to use the Cleese walk silhouettes as page numbers in a document.
- The 2017 video game Destiny 2 has an emote featuring the silly walk, titled "Bureaucratic Walk".

== COVID-19 pandemic ==
During the pandemic, unofficial signs stating that certain sidewalks are under the jurisdiction of The Ministry of Silly Walks were seen placed along sidewalks worldwide, including the United States, Canada, and England as a way to allow pedestrians to laugh in a stressful time.

== See also ==
- Gait (human)
- Gait analysis
