= Ian MacNaughton =

Scottish actor and director (1925–2002)

Edward Ian MacNaughton (30 December 1925 – 10 December 2002) was a Scottish actor, television producer and director, best known for his work with the Monty Python team.

MacNaughton was director and producer for all but four of the forty five episodes of Monty Python's Flying Circus from 1969 to 1974, director of the group's first feature film And Now for Something Completely Different in 1971 and director of their two German episodes, Monty Python's Fliegender Zirkus in 1971 and 1972.

In 1973, the production team shared the BAFTA Award for Best Light Entertainment Programme for Monty Python's Flying Circus.

== Early life ==
Ian MacNaughton was born in Glasgow and educated at Strathallan School in Perthshire.

His elder brother was killed in World War II. MacNaughton spent a year in medical school before abandoning his plans to become a doctor and joining the Royal Marines for a year in 1945. While serving with the Royal Marines in an officers' training squad at Deal, Kent, he was offered the chance to act with the Globe Players which was the Royal Marines amateur dramatics group.

After he was demobilised in 1946, he returned to Glasgow, where his father hoped he would join the family firm. However, he decided to apply for a one-year pre-RADA course in London, which he completed, though he did not enter the Academy itself.

== Actor ==
On his return to Scotland, MacNaughton spent several years acting on stage, regularly appearing in productions at the Citizens Theatre in Glasgow and the Gateway Theatre in Edinburgh. Most notably in 1948 he appeared in Tyrone Guthrie's production of David Lyndsay's A Satire of the Three Estates at the Edinburgh Festival.

MacNaughton started his film career with a small role as the police constable in the 1953 film Laxdale Hall, a British romantic comedy set in a village in the Scottish Highlands. In the same year he also had a small role in Rob Roy, the Highland Rogue as Callum MacGregor. In 1955 MacNaughton moved back to London, and was cast as Able Seaman McIntosh in Seagulls over Sorrento and as Haggis in the 1956 science fiction film X the Unknown. He then appeared in three episodes of the British television comedy show Hancock's Half Hour and had small roles in the films The Silent Enemy and The Safecracker.

MacNaughton continued to appear in small roles in both television and film throughout 1958 and 1959 before playing the role of Kilmartin Dalrymple in all 30 episodes of the British sitcom Tell It to the Marines. The comedy revolved around the antics of a tough, boisterous Royal Marine squadron who find themselves billeted with some Royal Navy personnel.

Thereafter, he had a succession of small roles including the television series Silent Evidence in 1962, in which he played the character of Angus MacCrae. In the same year he also played the character of Michael George Hartley in Lawrence of Arabia.

== Director and producer ==
While appearing in the BBC drama series Silent Evidence, MacNaughton answered an ad for a BBC training course in television directing, for which he was accepted. In 1963 and 1964 he directed two episodes of Teletale and in 1965 an episode of Z-Cars. MacNaughton continued to act in numerous small roles for television and film, including Dr. Finlay's Casebook and Redcap in 1964 and The Avengers in 1965.

In 1966 and 1967 he directed all 52 episodes of a BBC series called This Man Craig, which was set in a large comprehensive school in the fictional Scottish village of Strathaird. The series revolved around the daily life of schoolmaster Ian Craig, who as one of six housemasters had to keep an eye on the problems of over 300 pupils. Between 1967 and 1968, he also directed eight episodes of Dr. Finlay's Casebook.

In 1969 MacNaughton directed and produced the first series of Spike Milligan's Q, a surreal British comedy television sketch show consisting of seven episodes. The show had a big influence on the Monty Python team. In The Python Autobiography by the Pythons, Michael Palin mentions meeting their directors. "One was Ian MacNaughton, director of the Spike Milligan Q5 series which we all thought was one of the best comedy shows on TV and certainly the most far ahead..." (p. 218). He describes himself and Terry Jones as being so impressed with the Q... show that they specifically sought out MacNaughton to direct their own series."

Between 1969 and 1974 MacNaughton would produce and direct all but four of the 45 episodes of Monty Python's Flying Circus. Having accepted the job of director and producer, MacNaughton announced to the Pythons' dismay that he had to take a holiday and would be unavailable for the first four shows, which were consequently directed by John Howard Davies. Initially, there was some friction between MacNaughton and the Pythons because of their close involvement with the way the show was directed, but by the end of the first series he had become one of the team and his contribution was significant. In 1970 the team filmed the second series of Monty Python's Flying Circus.

In 1971 MacNaughton directed the team's first film, And Now For Something Completely Different, which was a remake of the most popular sketches from the show's first two series. In the same year, MacNaughton directed the group in the first of two German specials filmed in Bavaria called, Monty Python's Fliegender Zirkus. The following year he directed the second episode of the Python's German specials, another comedy sketch show starring Spike Milligan, and the third series of Monty Python's Flying Circus.

MacNaughton directed episodes of several television series in 1973 and in 1974, including the pilot episode of Rising Damp with Leonard Rossiter, which received good reviews. Later that year he filmed the fourth and final series of Monty Python. In 1975, the second series of Spike Milligan's Q was commissioned by the BBC called Q6. MacNaughton directed Q6 in 1975, Q7 in 1977, Q8 in 1978 and Q9 in 1980.

In 1976, MacNaughton directed another pilot comedy sketch show called Out of the Trees, starring Monty Python alumnus Graham Chapman. They only filmed one episode, as the show was not commissioned by the BBC. In 1977 he directed five episodes of Middlemen, starring Frank Windsor. In 1979, he made the short film Le Pétomane about Joseph Pujol, starring Leonard Rossiter.

From the late 1970s onwards MacNaughton was based in Munich and he continued to work as a director in television and on stage. In 1980 he directed six episodes of the German comedy show, Harry Hocker läßt nicht locker, starring Harald Wolff. He also directed numerous operas and musicals, working in venues around the world, including Israel, Yugoslavia, Norway and Austria. In 1996 he directed Australian composer George Dreyfus' comedy, The Marx Sisters in Bielefeld and in 1997 Gerhard Baumann's Nyx in Munich. At the theatre in Hall, near Innsbruck in Austria he directed plays by Otto Grunmandl.

== Personal life ==
In 1958, MacNaughton married actress Rita Davies, with whom he had two children and who frequently guest-starred in episodes of Monty Python. They were married for 20 years before divorcing in 1978. In 1995, he married his second wife, Ike Ott, whom he had met while filming Monty Python's German episodes in Bavaria in 1972.

=== Death ===
In 2001 MacNaughton suffered extensive injuries in a car accident while returning to his home in Munich, Germany from the first night of a translation of Alan Ayckbourn's play Seasons Greetings in Hall, Austria. He eventually died from these injuries on 10 December 2002, aged 76.

== Partial filmography ==
- Laxdale Hall (1953) - First Constable
- Rob Roy, the Highland Rogue (1953) - Callum MacGregor
- X the Unknown (1956) - Haggis
- The Silent Enemy (1958) - Sentry outside Admiral's Office
- The Safecracker (1958) - Thomson
- Idol on Parade (1959) - (uncredited)
- The Bridal Path (1959) - Fisherman
- Lawrence of Arabia (1962) - Corporal Michael George Hartley (uncredited)
- Redcap (1964) - Corporal McCann
- Hollywood-Monster (1987) - Frederick McCloud

== Awards and nominations ==
- BAFTA Awards
  - 1970 Nominated for Best Light Entertainment for Monty Python's Flying Circus with John Howard Davies.
  - 1971 Nominated for Best Light Entertainment Production for Monty Python's Flying Circus.
  - 1973 Won for Best Light Entertainment Programme for Monty Python's Flying Circus. (Shared with production team)
  - 1975 Nominated for Best Light Entertainment Programme for Monty Python's Flying Circus.
- Primetime Emmy Awards
  - 1976 Nominated for Outstanding Variety, Music, or Comedy Special for the Monty Python Show (1975).
