= Carol Cleveland =

British-American actress and comedian (born 1942)

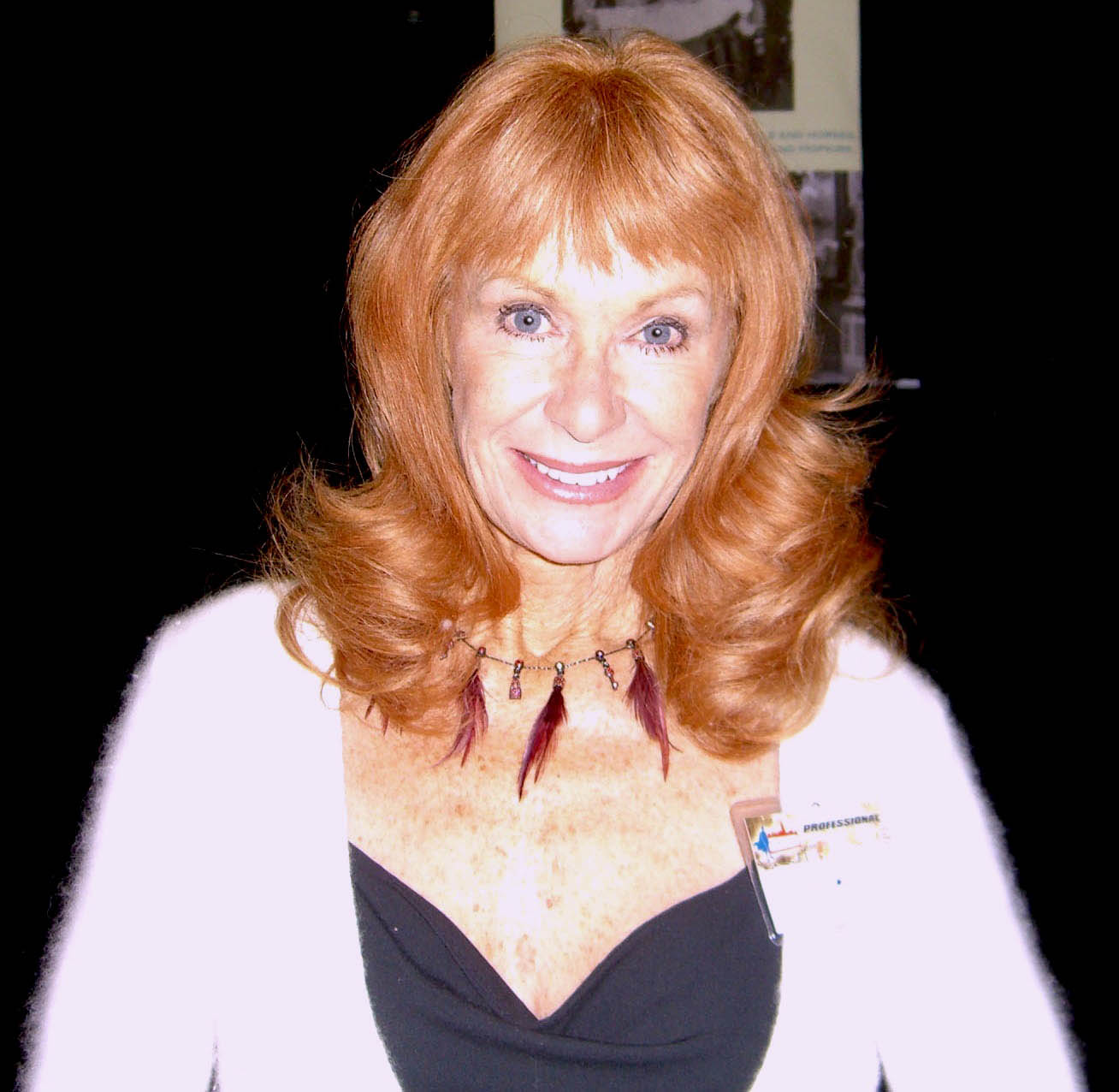
- Carol Cleveland in 2009
- Born: 13 January 1942 (age 84); East Sheen, London, England
- Years active: 1960–present
- Spouse: Peter Brett (m. 1971; div. 1983)
- Website: www.carolcleveland.com

Carol Cleveland (born Carol Gillian Frances on 13 January 1942) is an American-English actor, comedian, dancer, and model. She is particularly known for her work with Monty Python.

== Early life ==
Born in East Sheen, London, she moved to the United States with her mother and U.S. Air Force stepfather at an early age. She was brought up in Philadelphia, Pennsylvania; Lubbock, Texas; and later Pasadena, California, where she attended John Marshall Junior High School and Pasadena High School. She is a former Miss California Navy and appeared as Miss Teen Queen in MAD Magazine at age 15. Cleveland was Miss Teen in the August 1958 issue of Dig magazine.

Cleveland returned with her family to London in 1960, and studied at the Royal Academy of Dramatic Art.

== Career ==
A stage actress and model, Carol Cleveland appeared in the UK premiere of Henze's Boulevard Solitude at Sadler's Wells Theatre in June 1962. On screen she was in The Persuaders!, in The Saint as a secretary, as a lover of Peter Wyngarde's character in The Avengers TV series episode "A Touch of Brimstone" (1966), and in other TV shows and films. She was in BBC comedy productions, including The Two Ronnies, Morecambe and Wise, and various Spike Milligan programmes.

=== Monty Python ===
Her comedy acting skills brought her to the attention of the production team of Monty Python's Flying Circus. She appeared in 32 of the 45 episodes in the series, plus all four Monty Python movies. Cleveland has contributed to many post-Python projects including the Concert for George and Not the Messiah (He's a Very Naughty Boy). She has also appeared in many documentaries about the group's history, including Monty Python: Almost the Truth (Lawyers Cut).

=== Other work ===
In 1972, Cleveland was voted number three in Splendor magazine's "100 Most Beautiful Entertainers" list.

In 1986, Cleveland played an American television journalist in Only Fools and Horses, in the episode "The Miracle of Peckham"; then in 1995, she had a small cameo in a sketch within Fist of Fun, a BBC comedy show featuring Stewart Lee and Richard Herring. In 2022, she appeared in an episode of First Dates.

== Filmography ==
=== Film ===
Year	Title	Role	Notes
1963	The Cracksman	Pirate	uncredited
1963	Strictly for the Birds	Sandra	
1964	The Americanization of Emily	Army Driver	uncredited
1965	The Pleasure Girls	Ella	
1967	A Countess from Hong Kong	Nurse	
1967	Mister Ten Per Cent	Hat Check Girl	
1967	In Saigon Some May Live	Girl	
1968	Salt and Pepper	Club Hostess	
1968	The Bliss of Mrs. Blossom	Bra Model	
1969	If It's Tuesday, This Must Be Belgium	Travel Agent	
1969	The Adding Machine	Judy	
1969	Moon Zero Two	Hostess	
1970	Every Home Should Have One	Suzy	
1971	And Now for Something Completely Different	Various	
1974	Vampira	Jane	
1974	All I Want Is You... and You... and You...	Eli Hartford	
1975	Monty Python and the Holy Grail	Zoot / Dingo	
1975	The Return of the Pink Panther	Swimming Pool Diver	
1977	The Brute	Diane's Agent	
1979	Monty Python's Life of Brian	Mrs. Gregory	
1982	Monty Python Live at the Hollywood Bowl	Various	
1983	Monty Python's The Meaning of Life	Various	
1983	Funny Money	Delphine	
1986	Half Moon Street	American Wife	
1995	Annie: A Royal Adventure!	Miss Hannigan	
2007	Too Much Too Young	June	
2010	Not the Messiah (He's a Very Naughty Boy)	Various	
2012	A Liar's Autobiography: The Untrue Story of Monty Python's Graham Chapman	Various	
2013	The Sweeter Side of Life	Edna	
2013	The Search for Simon	Irene Jones	
2019	The Rizen: Possession	The Ancient One	
2021	Alice, Through the Looking	Queen Elizabeth II	

=== Television ===
Year	Title	Role	Notes
1961	Dixon of Dock Green	Sandra	Episode: "A Quiet, Ordinary Woman"
1963	ITV Play of the Week	Marion	Episode: "The Touch of a Dead Hand"
1963	The Sentimental Agent	Shelah	Episode: "May the Saints Preserve Us"
1963	The Saint	Marion Kent	Episode: "The Sporting Chance"
1964	No Hiding Place	Samantha Kay	Episode: "The Things Money Can Buy"
1964	ITV Play of the Week	Helen Carver	Episode: "Design for Living"
1964	ITV Play of the Week	Celia	Episode: "The Other Man"
1964	ITV Play of the Week	Katie	Episode: "A Really Good Jazz Piano"
1965	The Ambassadors	Mamie Pocock	TV film
1965	The Saint	Gloria Mancini	Episode: "The Crime of the Century"
1965	The Man in Room 17	Marya Ference	Episode: "A Minor Operation"
1966	The Avengers	Sara	Episode: "A Touch of Brimstone"
1966	BBC Play of the Month	Barbara Davies	Episode: "Lee Oswald: Assassin"
1967	The Reluctant Romeo	Natalie	Episode: "A Tale of Two Secretaries"
1967	Man in a Suitcase	Miss Dinsdale	Episode: "The Sitting Pigeon"
1968	Love Story	Waitress	Episode: "The Egg on the Face of the Tiger"
1968	Journey to the Unknown	Lisa	Episode: "Do Me a Favor and Kill Me"
1969	Father, Dear Father	Bunny Mother	Episode: "We Can't Afford a Carriage"
1969–1974	Monty Python's Flying Circus	Various	32 episodes
1969	Randall and Hopkirk (Deceased)	Laura Slade	Episode: "For the Girl Who Has Everything"
1970	Foreign Exchange	Girl	TV film
1971	The Liver Birds	Fiancée	Episode: "The New Neighbour"
1971	The Persuaders!	Girl at Airport	Episode: "Element of Risk"
1972	The Lotus Eaters	Leigh Mervish	5 episodes
1973	Now Look Here	Nina	Episode: #2.1
1973	Doctor in Charge	Nurse Dobbs	Episode: "Men Without Women"
1973	Crime of Passion	Suzy	Episode: "Chantal"
1974	The Last Turkey in the Shop Show	Various	TV film
1978	Mike Yarwood in Persons	Sadie	Episode: #2.5
1985	Are You Being Served?	Lady Customer	Episode: "Friends and Neighbours"
1986	Hilary	Victoria Sands	Episode: "Over the Hill?"
1986	Only Fools and Horses	Sandra Potts	Episode: "The Miracle of Peckham"
1991	About Face	Mrs. Rodgers	Episode: "Tourist Attraction"
1992	Land of Hope and Gloria	Loretta	Episode: "The Authentic Taste of England"
1995	Fist of Fun	Mrs. Neil	Episode: #1.3
2013	Toast of London	Brooke Hooberman	Episode: "The End"
2022	First Dates	Herself	Episode: #18.2
