= Bogan =

Unrefined or unsophisticated person

Bogan (/ˈboʊɡən/ BOHG-ən) is Australian and New Zealand slang to describe a person whose speech, clothing, behaviour, or attitudes are considered unrefined or unsophisticated. Depending on the context, the term can be used pejoratively or in a humorous, self-deprecating manner. The term "bogan" has also been associated with changing social attitudes towards class in Australia, and its use often reflects broader cultural stereotypes and divisions.

Since the 1980s, the bogan has become a very well-recognised subculture, often as an example of bad taste. It has antecedents in the Australian larrikin and ocker, and various localised names exist that describe the same or very similar people to the bogan.

== History ==
The origin of the term bogan is unclear; both the Macquarie Dictionary and the Australian Oxford Dictionary cite the origin as unknown. Some Sydney residents' recollection is that the term is based on the concept that residents of the western suburbs (stereotyped as "Westies") displayed what are now termed "bogan" characteristics and that an individual who displayed these characteristics to a strong extent was as "west" as the Bogan River in western New South Wales. According to another anecdote, the term emerged in Melbourne's outer-western and outer-eastern suburbs in the late 1970s and early 1980s.

Another possible origin may be the 1973 Burt Reynolds film White Lightning, which was set in fictitious "Bogan County" in the state of Arkansas. The film, which is partly set at the "Bogan Raceway" dirt track where a modified sedan/demolition derby type race is taking place, is principally a vehicle for Reynolds and other Redneck type characters to indulge in lots of tyre smoking car chases, stunts and "hoon" type driving.

The term "bog" has been used in Perth, Western Australia since at least the late 1960s, and means the same as bogan. The term "bog laps" is still used in Perth to mean the same as "hoon laps" and "blockies" are used to mean in other parts of Australia – driving around in a muscle car doing burnouts or wheelies here and there.

The term became widely known in the late 1980s when the teenage character Kylie Mole (played by Mary-Anne Fahey), in the Australian sketch comedy television series The Comedy Company, frequently used the term to disparage anyone she disliked. The same program included a sketch about a magazine called Bogue (a parody of Vogue), which featured traditional bogans.

The Australian National Dictionary Centre (ANDC) included the word in its Australian dictionary project in 1991 and said the earliest use they found was in the September 1985 issue of surfing magazine Tracks: "So what if I have a Mohawk and wear Dr. Martens (boots for all you uninformed bogans)?"

In 2019, Bruce Moore of the Australian National University published a piece in The Conversation, in which he suggested an earlier usage or origin of the word, discovered by historian Helen Doyle: an article in a student magazine published at Melbourne's Xavier College in 1984, which describes a fictional toy—the "bogan doll"—which possesses many characteristics of the bogan stereotype.

There are places in western New South Wales that contain bogan in their name—for example Bogan Shire, the Bogan River and the rural village of Bogan Gate. Bogan Gate, for example, is derived from the local Aboriginal word meaning "the birthplace of a notable headman of the local tribe". Residents of streets such as Bogan Place and Bogan Road have been moved to action by the negative connotations of their street names and lobbied to rename them, prompting Ku-ring-gai mayor Nick Ebbeck to joke that he was a bit of a bogan himself. The 1902 poem "City of Dreadful Thirst" by Australian poet Banjo Paterson makes reference to a "Bogan shower" as a term meaning "three raindrops and some dust", although this is likely a reference to the dry area around the Bogan River. Makeshift gates in a rural fence in northwest NSW were known as bogan gates at least as early as the 1960s.

== Concept ==
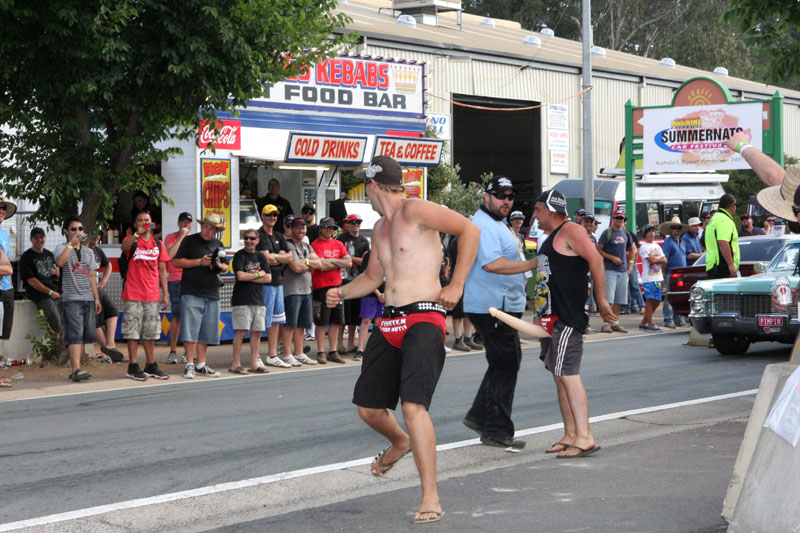
The annual Summernats car festival has been described as "bogan's dream come true".

Some features regularly associated with the bogan stereotype include Anglo-Celtic Australians residing in the outer working class suburbs of larger cities, having teeth that have not had dental care due to cost, having an anti-authoritarian or jingoistic stance, as well as being interested in classic rock music, hoon-driving and excessive alcohol consumption.

Certain types of clothing are stereotypically associated with bogans, including flannelette shirts, blue singlets, Stubbie shorts, fluoro (abbreviated from "fluorescent") workwear, ugg boots, jeans and black leggings.

Vehicles, such as earlier Holdens from FJ to HQ, Toranas, some Commodores, (more so sports variants, especially Peter Brock Commodores), SS models, HSV, and Ford Falcon right up to AU models, particularly modified or poorly maintained examples, also have similar associations.

A person described as a bogan may refuse to conform to middle-class standards of taste, dietary habits, leisure activities, styles of dress and ways of speaking, and might be looked down upon by some groups due to preconceived perceptions and biases which can often exacerbate the hardships faced by disadvantaged people.

Mel Campbell argued in a 2006 article in The Sydney Morning Herald that bogan (including "cashed-up bogan") is a nebulous, personal concept that is frequently used in a process by which "we use the idea of the bogan to quarantine ideas of Australianness that alarm or discomfort us. It's a way of erecting imaginary cultural barriers between 'us' and 'them'." Campbell argues that though many people believe they know exactly what a bogan is and what their characteristics might be, there is no defined set of characteristics of a bogan: the speaker imagines the denoted person to be different from, and less cultured than, themselves. Campbell considered "cashed-up bogan" to be a "stupid term". A similar argument is made by David Nichols, author of The Bogan Delusion (2011), who says that people have "created this creature that is a lesser human being to express their interclass hatred".

== Non-pejorative usage ==
The term bogan has sometimes been used favourably to indicate pride in being rough around the edges.

In 2002, Michelle Griffin discussed the fact that "bogan" is no longer just being used as an insult, but is in fact a way to identify with the "Aussie" culture that many Anglo-Australian citizens are proud of. In the past, bogan was a term of disdain, but nowadays it has become "cool" to be a bogan.

Radio station Triple J held a "National Bogan Day" on 28 June 2002, which they commemorated by playing music by rock bands such as Cold Chisel, Midnight Oil, Rose Tattoo and AC/DC.

In a 2011 study, linguistics students at the University of Auckland found that the term was likely to be thought of as positive by people under the age of 30, compared with over-30s who generally felt it was more of a negative term.

== Representation ==
=== Television ===
The typical bogan has been portrayed on television in shows such as Outrageous Fortune, Bogan Hunters, Fat Pizza, Housos, Bogan Pride, Kath & Kim, Upper Middle Bogan and Regular Old Bogan.

Peter (pronounced 'Poi-da') was a recurring bogan character played by Eric Bana on 1990s sketch comedy show Full Frontal.

=== Film ===
In the 2016 film Suicide Squad, DC Comics villain Captain Boomerang—a classically Australian character—is depicted as having a bogan-esque personality.

=== Internet ===
The popular website (and 2010 bestselling book) Things Bogans Like contains 250 articles on various things that bogans are claimed to like, and suggests that a "bogan today defies income, class, race, creed, gender and logic".

In 2007 Microsoft deemed bogan to be one of twenty colloquialisms most relevant to Australian users when the word was added to the dictionary of Microsoft Office 2007. The word entered the Oxford English Dictionary in June 2012.

The word bogan attracts negative attention online towards Anglo-Australians, and consequently boganbroadcast is actively campaigning to reclaim the term in a positive way.

=== Apps ===
An app known as "The Bogan Test" has been created to examine a person's likelihood to fall within the boundaries of the bogan category.

=== Music ===
Melbourne band This Is Serious Mum (TISM) sing about discrimination from coming from "the Western Suburbs" in "The History of Western Civilization" on the 'Hot Dogma' album released in 1990.

Australian ska-punk band Area-7 achieved one of their biggest hits with the song "Nobody Likes A Bogan", released in 2002.

Ben Folds included the lyric "Now I see the Bogans at the motor race" in his song "Adelaide" from his 'Super D' EP, released in 2004.

=== Literature ===
A "bogan" translation of Leo Tolstoy's novel War and Peace was made by Ander Louis in 2025.

== Use in marketing ==
"CUB" or "cashed up bogan" was used by social analyst David Chalke in 2006 to describe people of a blue collar background now earning a high salary and spending their earnings on expensive consumer items as a matter of conspicuous consumption. The media have cited tennis player Lleyton Hewitt and his actress wife, Bec Cartwright, as examples. Subsequently, the Kaesler Winery, in the Barossa Valley, released a Shiraz wine under the name Bogan. Mark Haisma, an Australian winemaker based in Burgundy, has created a wine he has named “A Bogan In Bogandy”.

== Regional equivalent terms ==
The Courier-Mail described "bogan" as peerless, and that it warrants acceptance as an Australian keyword. It also wrote "There are plenty of other words purporting to describe the same social and cultural subset or behaviour, but 'bogan' really does stand alone".

Although the term "bogan" is understood across Australia and New Zealand, certain regions have their own slang terms for the same group of people. These terms include:

- "Bevan" or "Bev" in Queensland.
- "Booner" in Canberra.
- "Scozza" in Geelong, Victoria, Australia.

"Westie" or "westy" is not synonymous with bogan, although westies are often stereotyped as being bogans. "Westie" predates bogan, originating in Sydney in the 1970s to refer to people from that city's western suburbs. As Sydney's western suburbs are predominantly working-class blue-collar areas, the term connotes a predominantly working-class blue-collar person – someone with little education, little taste, and very limited horizons. "Westie" is now in wide use in many cities and towns across both Australia and New Zealand, where it especially refers to the denizens of West Auckland.

== See also ==
Other Australian stereotypes and subcultures:

- Bodgies and widgies
- Lad
- Feral
- Eshay
- Hoon
- Larrikin
- Ocker
- Sharpies
- Westie
- Yobbo

International:

- Ah Beng (Singapore)
- Alay (Indonesia)
- Apaçi (Turkey)
- Ars or ערס (Israel)
- Beauf (France)
- Chav (England)
- Cocalar (Romania)
- Cracker (US)
- Dres (Poland)
- Favelado, Maloqueiro ou Pé-Rapado (Brazil)
- Flaite (Chile)
- Gopnik (Russia and Ukraine)
- Hick (US and Canada)
- Hillbilly (US)
- Hilljack (US)
- Hoopy (West Virginia and Pennsylvania, US)
- Hoser (Canada)
- Kagkouras (Greece)
- Maloqueiro (Brazil)
- Mat Rempit (Malaysia)
- Naco (Mexico)
- Ned (Scotland)
- Ñeri (Argentina)
- Pikey (UK)
- Pleb (UK)
- Prolet (Germany, page in German)
- Raggare (Sweden)
- Redleg (Barbados)
- Redneck (US and Canada)
- Rezzers (Manitoba and Saskatchewan, some parts of Northern Ontario, Northern Alberta and Yukon, Canada)
- Scally (UK and Ireland)
- Skanger (Ireland)
- Skeet (Newfoundland, Canada)
- Skid (parts of Canada)
- Skite (Prince Edward Island, Canada)
- Spide (Northern Ireland)
- Surrey Jack in (British Columbia, Canada)
- Tambay, Jejemon, Jologs (Philippines)
- Tokkie (Netherlands)
- Trailer trash (US)
- White trash (US)
- Yankī (Japan)
- Yarpie (South Africa)
- Yokel (US)
- Zef, similar to "cashed up bogan" (South Africa)

Hoopie (US)

Concepts:

- Classism
- Class conflict
- Gentrification
- Peasantry
- Yuppie
