= Bruces' Philosophers Song =

Song performed by Monty Python

"Bruces' Philosophers Song", also known as "The Bruces' Song", is a Monty Python song written and composed by Eric Idle that was a feature of the group's stage appearances and its recordings.

== Origins ==
The Bruces' Philosophers Song is sung by The Bruces, stereotypical "ocker" Australians of the period. The Bruces are kitted out in khakis, slouch hats and a cork hat, and are faculty members of the Philosophy Department at the fictional University of Woolamaloo (Woolloomooloo is an inner suburb of Sydney, although there is no university there).

The Bruces themselves first appeared in the Bruces sketch which featured in episode 22, "How to Recognise Different Parts of the Body", of the TV show Monty Python's Flying Circus, first broadcast on 24 November 1970. The sketch shows an English academic (played by Terry Jones) coming to a hot and perhaps remote part of Australia and being inducted by the Bruces (John Cleese, Graham Chapman, Eric Idle and Michael Palin) into their Philosophy Department, seemingly located in a simple wooden shack. The Bruces are lounging around a wooden table and soon start drinking cans of Foster's Lager.

The song was not part of the TV sketch; it first appeared on the Monty Python's 1973 album Matching Tie and Handkerchief as a coda for the album version of the sketch. The song was subsequently included in most of the Monty Python team's live shows, sometimes as a singalong with musical accompaniment provided by a Jew's harp.

== Lyrics ==
The song's lyrics make a series of scandalous allegations about a number of highly respected philosophers, usually with regard to their capacity or incapacity for imbibing alcoholic drinks.

The sixth line differs from version to version. While the studio recording on Matching Tie and Handkerchief refers solely to "Wilhelm Friedrich Hegel", live recordings (included in the Monty Python Live at the Hollywood Bowl film and on the albums Live at Drury Lane and Live at City Center) mention "Schopenhauer and Hegel."

== The philosophers ==
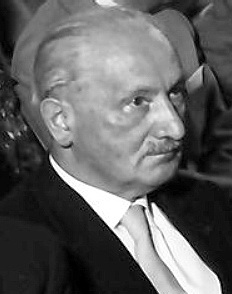
Heidegger in 1960

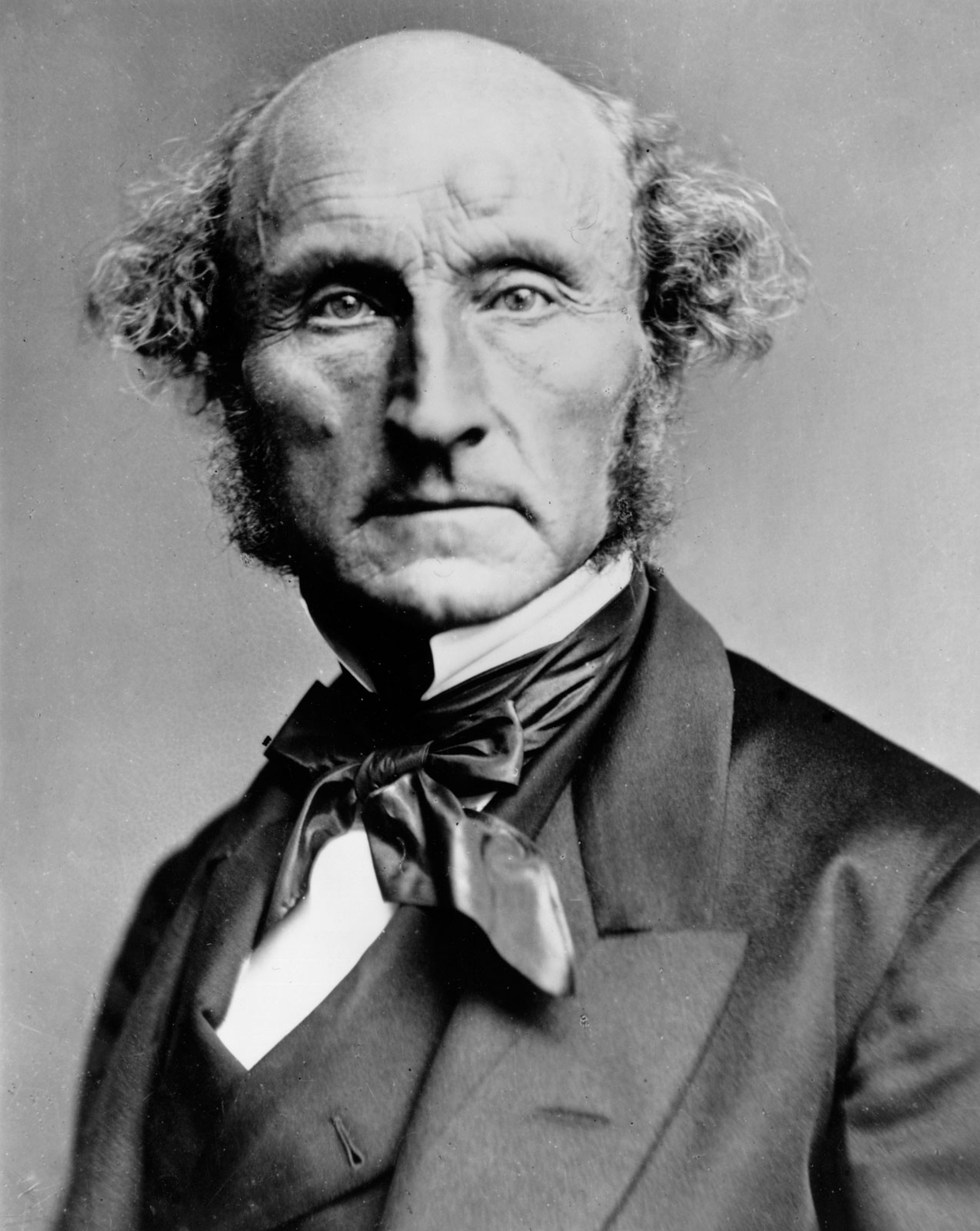
Mill in about 1870

All the philosophers whom the song mentions were dead by the time it appeared, apart from Martin Heidegger.

Philosophers mentioned in the song (in order):

1. Immanuel Kant (a real pissant who was very rarely stable)
2. Martin Heidegger (a boozy beggar who could think you under the table)
3. David Hume (able to out-consume G. W. F. Hegel)
4. Georg Wilhelm Friedrich Hegel (out-consumed by Hume)
5. Arthur Schopenhauer (in some versions also out-consumed by Hume)
6. Ludwig Wittgenstein (a beery swine who was just as "sloshed", i.e. drunk, as Schlegel)
7. Karl Wilhelm Friedrich Schlegel or August Wilhelm Schlegel (Wittgenstein is alleged be just as sloshed as one of them)
8. Friedrich Nietzsche (particularly knowledgeable about "the raising of the wrist")
9. Socrates (mentioned twice in each refrain: permanently "pissed", i.e. drunk)
10. John Stuart Mill (particularly ill after half a pint of shandy)
11. Plato (said to regularly consume half a crate of whiskey daily)
12. Aristotle (a bugger for the bottle)
13. Thomas Hobbes (fond of his dram)
14. René Descartes (a drunken fart: "I drink, therefore I am", which is a pun on Descartes's famous philosophical quote: "I think, therefore I am".)
15. Socrates (second mention) (particularly missed, noted as both a lovely little thinker, but a bugger when pissed)
