= Hello Sailor =

Hello Sailor may refer to:

- Hello Sailor (band), a New Zealand rock band
- Hello Sailor (Hello Sailor album)
- Hello Sailor (The Blackout Pact album)
- Hello Sailor (book), a children's book by Ingrid Godon and Andre Sollie
- Hello Sailor (novel), a 1975 book by Eric Idle
