= Bruces sketch =

Monty Python sketch

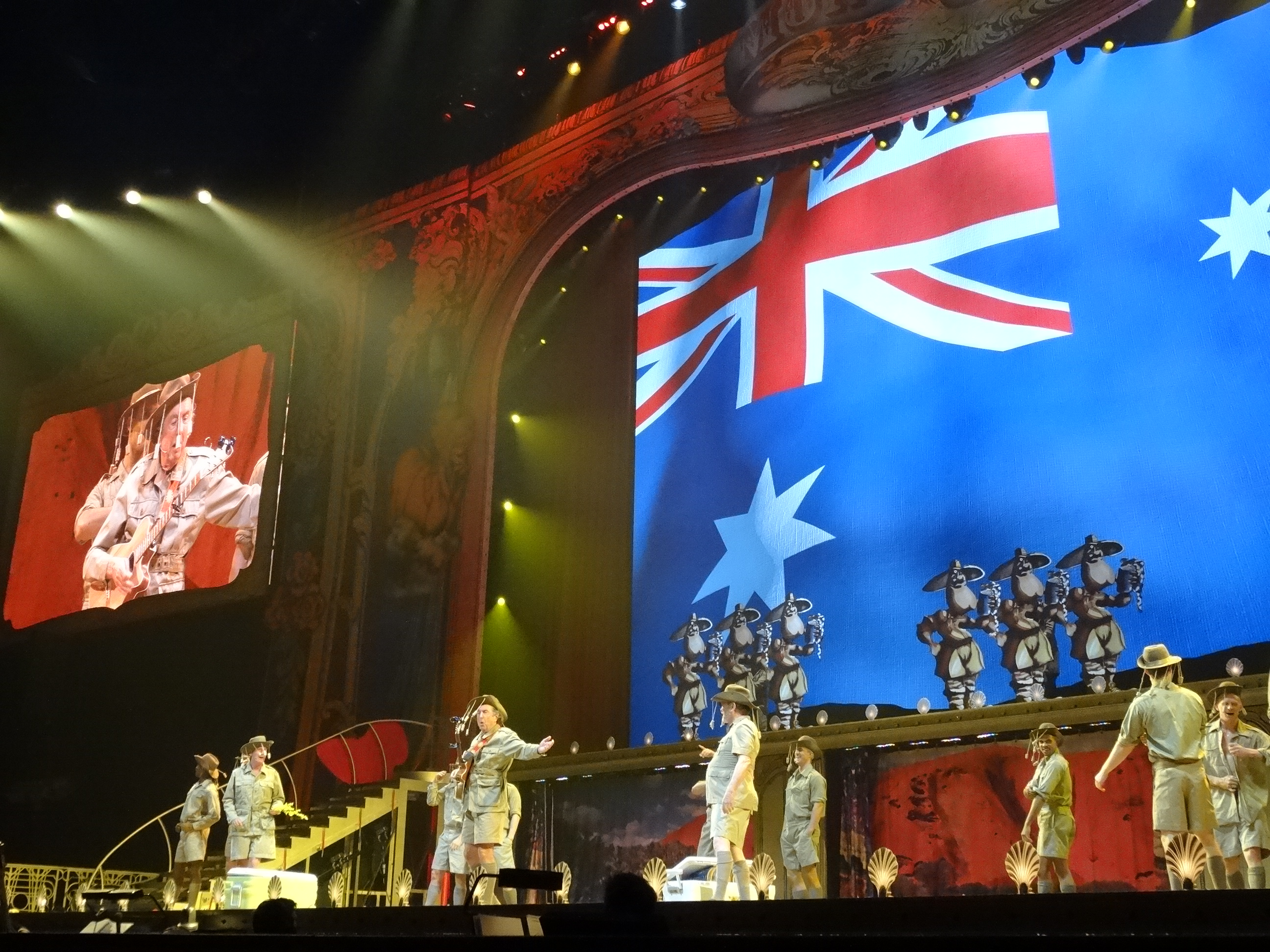
Bruces sketch at Monty Python Live (Mostly) (London, 2014).

The Bruces sketch is a comedy sketch that originally appeared in a 1970 episode of the television show Monty Python's Flying Circus, episode 22, "How to Recognise Different Parts of the Body", and was subsequently performed on audio recordings and live on many occasions by the Monty Python team.

In reference to the sketch, Iron Maiden singer Bruce Dickinson used the stage name "Bruce Bruce" while a member of the British hard rock band Samson.

== Description ==
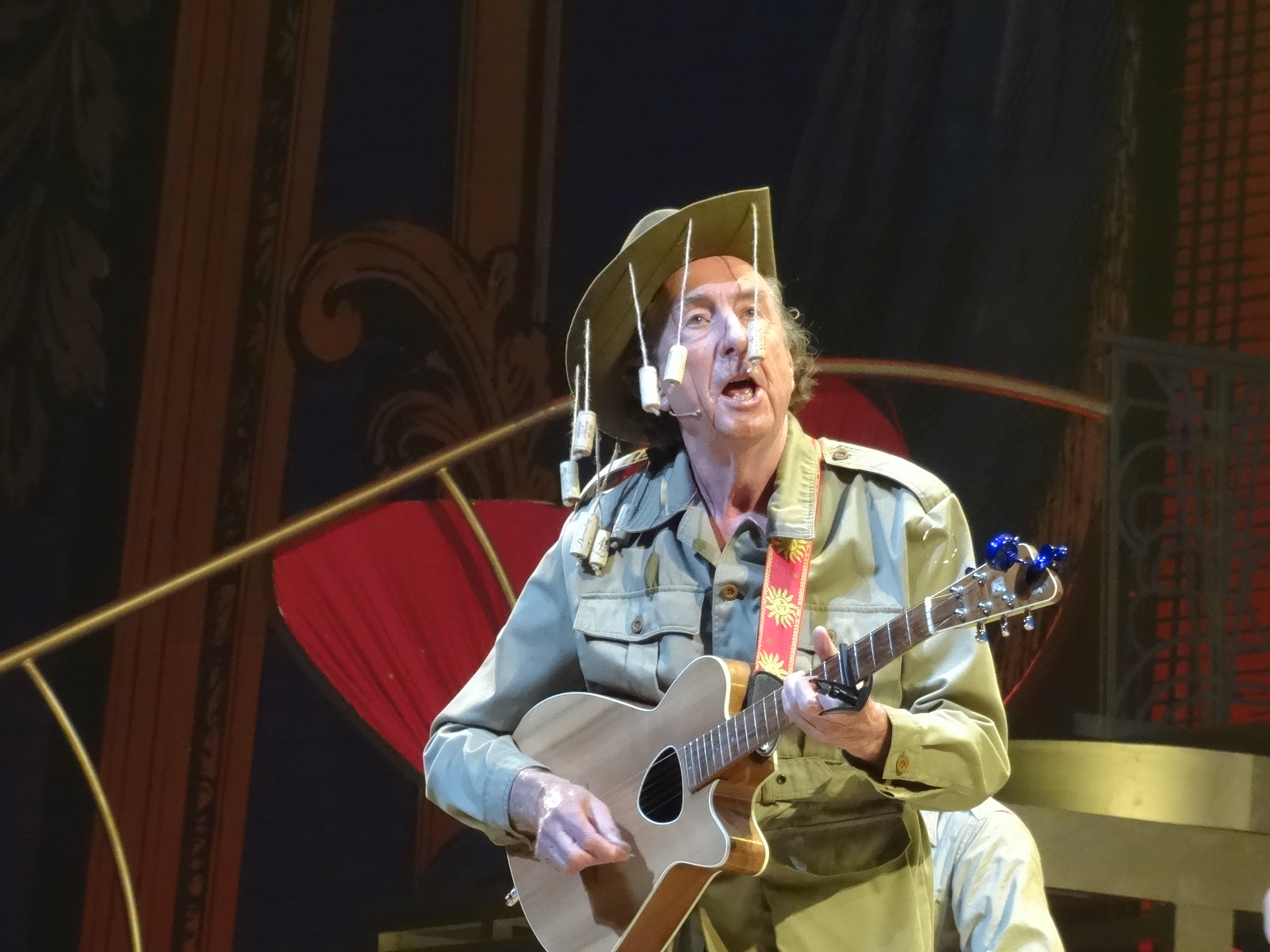
Eric Idle at Monty Python Live (Mostly), 2014.

The sketch involves four stereotypical "ocker" Australians of the period, who are all wearing khakis and cork hats. All are named Bruce, hence being known as the Bruces.

The skit begins with a shot of a man’s kneecap, labelled (as part of the episode’s theme, "How to Recognise Different Parts of the Body"). The camera zooms out to reveal it as belonging to an Australian man named Bruce (Eric Idle), who is seated with two other men, also named Bruce (Graham Chapman and Michael Palin). Their boss, a fourth Bruce (John Cleese) arrives with a new staff member, a "pommie" (Englishman) named Michael Baldwin (Terry Jones). The setting turns out to be a meeting of the Philosophy Department of the University of Woolamaloo. Because Baldwin's first name is different from everyone else's, he is asked if he minds being called "Bruce" to avoid confusion.

The department appears to be situated in nothing more than a simple wooden building somewhere near Uluru/Ayers Rock (which is visible in the distance behind them) in Australia's Northern Territory.

The Bruces share a fondness for lager beer and a dislike of "poofters" (a derogatory Australian and English slang word for a homosexual). Cleese's character (who in a later sketch is called Bruce Beer) recites the seven faculty rules of the University of Woolamaloo:

1. No poofters.
2. No member of the faculty is to maltreat the "Abos" in any way whatsoever—if there's anyone watching.
3. No poofters.
4. I don't want to catch anyone not drinking in their room after lights out.
5. No poofters.
6. There is no rule six.
7. No poofters.

The meeting contains various prayers recited by the Bruces, including: "Oh Lord, we beseech thee. Amen.", "Australia, Australia, Australia, Australia, we love you. Amen.", and "This here's the wattle, the emblem of our land. You can stick it in a bottle or you can hold it in your hand. Amen."

After an Aboriginal servant hands over some steaks, the first Bruce notices something, exclaims, "Sidney Nolan! What’s that?!", and points at Baldwin’s ear, which is identified as the next part of the body.

== Versions ==
The sketch appeared on the Matching Tie and Handkerchief album and in many of the team's stage shows, where it would be capped with a performance of "Bruces' Philosophers Song". Free cans of Foster's beer were tossed to the audience with the addition of a joke about American beer given at Monty Python Live at the Hollywood Bowl.

A slightly different version of the sketch is recorded on Monty Python Live at Drury Lane. The identity of "Bruce" is Lauchlan Chipman, professor of philosophy and friend of Michael Palin. Chipman was the founding chairman of the Philosophy Department at the University of Wollongong.

== Development ==
Eric Idle co-wrote the sketch with Cleese and said he based it on his Australian friends from the 1960s "who always seemed to be called Bruce". Australian film director Bruce Beresford was friends with Idle while Idle was living in Notting Hill.

The fictional University of Woolamaloo is either a misspelling of or a name derived from the Sydney suburb of Woolloomooloo, which is pronounced "Woolamaloo" with an Australian accent.
