= Eric Idle =

English comedian, actor and writer (born 1943)

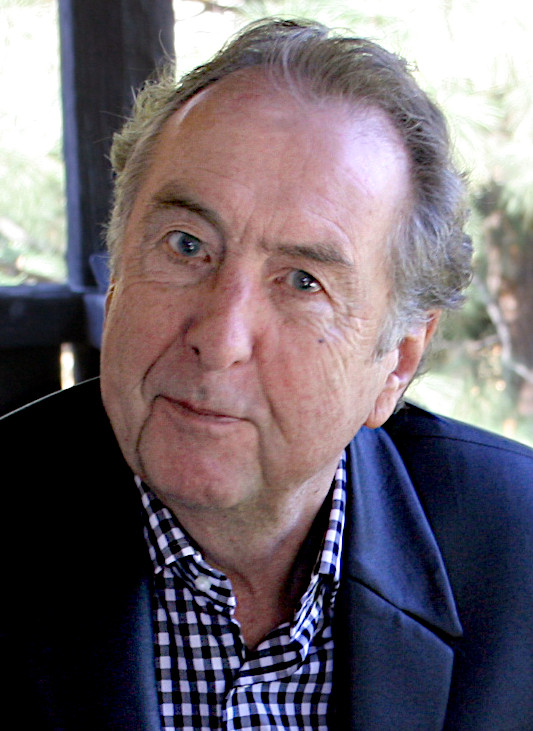
- Idle in 2012
- Born: 29 March 1943 (age 83); South Shields, England
- Education: Pembroke College, Cambridge
- Occupations: Actor; comedian; songwriter; musician; screenwriter; playwright
- Years active: 1967–present
- Notable work: Monty Python; The Rutles; Spamalot
- Spouses: Lyn Ashley (m. 1969; div. 1975) Tania Kosevich (m. 1981)
- Children: 2
- Relatives: Madge Ryan (former-mother-in-law)
- Website: ericidle.com

Eric Idle (born 29 March 1943) is an English actor, comedian, songwriter, musician, screenwriter and playwright. He was a member of the British comedy group Monty Python and the parody rock band the Rutles. Idle studied English at Pembroke College, Cambridge, and joined Cambridge University Footlights. He has received a Grammy Award as well as nominations for two Tony Awards.

Idle reached stardom in the 1970s when he co-created and acted in the Python sketch comedy series Flying Circus (1969–1974) and the films Holy Grail (1975), Life of Brian, (1979) and The Meaning of Life (1983) with Graham Chapman, John Cleese, Terry Gilliam, Terry Jones, and Michael Palin. Known for his elaborate wordplay and musical numbers, Idle composed and performed many of the songs featured in Python projects, including "Always Look on the Bright Side of Life".

After Flying Circus ended, Idle created another sketch show Rutland Weekend Television (1975–1976), and hosted Saturday Night Live four times (1976–1979). He also acted in films such as National Lampoon's European Vacation (1985), The Transformers: The Movie (1986), The Adventures of Baron Munchausen (1988), Nuns on the Run (1990), Splitting Heirs (1993), Casper (1995), The Wind in the Willows (1996), An Alan Smithee Film: Burn Hollywood Burn (1997), Ella Enchanted (2004), and Shrek the Third (2007).

Idle made his Broadway debut with his adaptation of Holy Grail into the musical, Spamalot (2005), which was a critical and commercial success, earning the Tony Award for Best Musical and Grammy Award for Best Musical Theater Album. He also wrote Not the Messiah (2009) and performed at the London 2012 Olympic Games closing ceremony.

== Early life and education ==
Eric Idle was born on 29 March 1943 in Harton Hospital, in South Shields. His mother, Norah Barron Sanderson, was a nurse, and his father, Ernest Idle, served in the Royal Air Force during the Second World War, only to be killed in a road accident while hitchhiking home for Christmas in December 1945. Idle said his mother "disappeared for a while into depression" and consequently he was brought up by his grandmother in Swinton, Lancashire. Idle spent part of his childhood in Wallasey, Cheshire, and attended St George's Primary School.

His mother had difficulty coping with a full-time job and bringing up a child, so when Idle was seven, she enrolled him in the Royal Wolverhampton School as a boarder. At that time the school was a charitable foundation dedicated to the education and maintenance of children who had lost one or both parents. Idle said: "It was a physically abusive, bullying, harsh environment for a kid to grow up in. I got used to dealing with groups of boys and getting on with life in unpleasant circumstances and being smart and funny and subversive at the expense of authority. Perfect training for Python."

Idle has stated that the two things that made his life at school bearable were listening to Radio Luxembourg under the bedclothes and watching the local football team, Wolverhampton Wanderers. He disliked other sports, and would sneak out of school every Thursday afternoon to the local cinema. He was eventually caught watching the film BUtterfield 8 (rated as suitable for audiences of age 16 and over under the contemporary film certificates) and stripped of his prefecture, though by that time he was head boy. Idle had already refused to be senior boy in the school cadet force, as he supported the Campaign for Nuclear Disarmament and had participated in the yearly Aldermaston March. He says there was little to do at the school, and boredom drove him to study hard and consequently to secure a place at Cambridge University.

== Career ==
=== Pre-Python career (1965–1969) ===
Idle attended Pembroke College, Cambridge, where he studied English. At Pembroke, he was invited to join the prestigious Cambridge University Footlights Club by the president of the Footlights Club, Tim Brooke-Taylor, and Footlights Club member Bill Oddie.

I'd never heard of the Footlights when I got there, but we had a tradition of college smoking-concerts, and I sent in some sketches parodying a play that had just been done. Tim Brooke-Taylor and Bill Oddie auditioned me for the Footlights smoker, and that led to me discovering about and getting into the Footlights, which was great.

Idle started at Cambridge only a year after future fellow-Pythons Graham Chapman and John Cleese. He became Footlights President in 1965 and was the first to allow women to join the club. He starred in the television comedy series Do Not Adjust Your Set co-starring his future Python castmates Terry Jones and Michael Palin. Terry Gilliam provided animations for the show. The show's cast included comic actors David Jason and Denise Coffey. Idle also appeared as guest in some episodes of the television series At Last the 1948 Show, which featured Cleese and Chapman in its principal cast.

=== Monty Python (1969–1983) ===
Idle wrote for Python mostly by himself, at his own pace, although he sometimes found it difficult to present material to the others and make it seem funny without the back-up support of a partner. The other Pythons usually worked in teams and Cleese admitted that this was slightly unfair – when the Pythons voted on which sketches should appear in a show, "he (Idle) only got one vote". However, he also says that Idle was an independent person and worked best on his own. Idle himself admitted this was sometimes difficult: "You had to convince five others. And they were not the most un-egotistical of writers, either." He occasionally wrote with Cleese.

Idle's work in Python is often characterised by an obsession with language and communication: many of his characters have verbal peculiarities, such as the man who speaks in anagrams, the man who says words in the wrong order, and the butcher who alternates between rudeness and politeness every time he speaks. A number of his sketches involve extended monologues (for example the customer in the "Travel Agency" sketch who will not stop talking about his unpleasant experiences with holidays), and he would frequently spoof the unnatural language and speech patterns of television presenters. Idle is said to be the master of insincere characters, from the David Frost-esque Timmy Williams, to small-time crook Stig O'Tracy, who tries to deny the fact that organised crime master Dinsdale Piranha nailed his head to the floor.

The second-youngest member of the Pythons, Idle was closest in spirit to the teenagers who made up much of Python's fanbase. Python sketches dealing most with contemporary obsessions like pop music, sexual permissiveness and recreational drugs are usually Idle's work, often characterised by double entendre, sexual references, and other "naughty" subject matter – most famously demonstrated in "Nudge Nudge". Idle originally wrote "Nudge, Nudge" for Ronnie Barker, but it was rejected because there was 'no joke in the words'.

A talented guitarist, Idle composed many of the group's most famous musical numbers, most notably "Always Look on the Bright Side of Life", the closing number of Life of Brian, which has grown to become a Python signature tune. He was responsible for the "Galaxy Song" from The Meaning of Life and "Eric the Half-a-Bee", a whimsical tune that first appeared on the Previous Record album.

=== Post-Python career (since 1973) ===
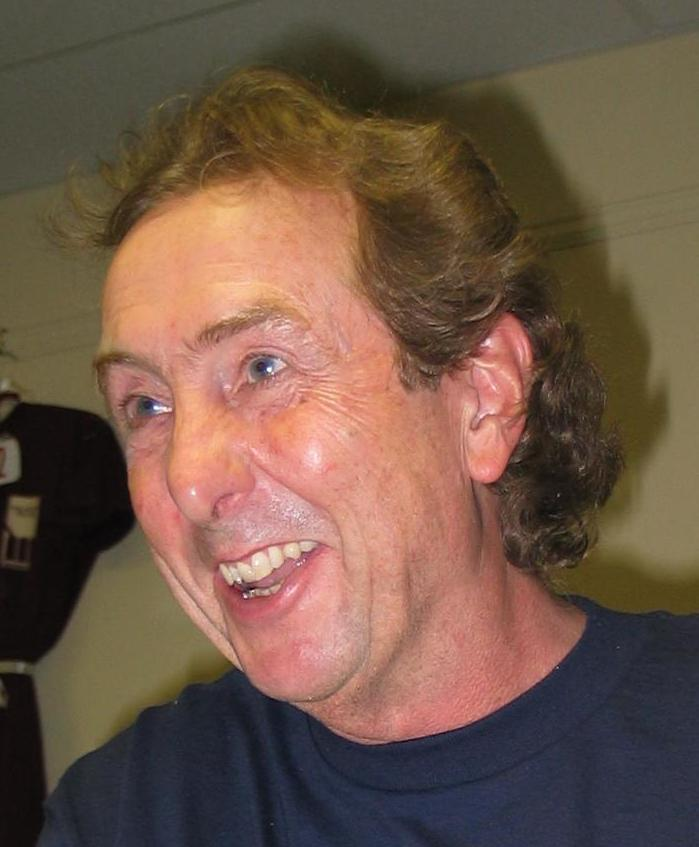
Eric Idle in 2003

After the success of Python in the early 1970s, all six members pursued solo projects. Idle's first solo work was his own BBC Radio One show, Radio Five (pre-dating the real Radio Five station by 18 years). This ran for two seasons from 1973 to 1974 and involved Idle performing sketches and links to records, playing nearly all the multi-tracked parts himself.

On television, Idle created and wrote Rutland Weekend Television (RWT), a sketch show on BBC2 with music by Neil Innes. RWT was 'Britain's smallest television network'. The name was a parody of London Weekend Television, the independent television franchise contractor that provided Londoners with their ITV services at weekends; Rutland had been England's smallest county, but had recently been 'abolished' in an administrative shake-up. To make the joke complete, the programme went out on a weekday. Other regular performers were David Battley, Henry Woolf, Gwen Taylor and Terence Bayler. George Harrison made a guest appearance on one episode.

A legacy of RWT was the creation, with Innes, of the Rutles, an affectionate parody of the Beatles. The band became a popular phenomenon, especially in the U.S. where Idle was appearing on Saturday Night Live – fans would send in Beatles LPs with their sleeves altered to show the Rutles. In 1978, the Rutles' mockumentary film All You Need Is Cash, a collaboration between Python members and Saturday Night Live, was aired on NBC television, written by Idle, with music by Innes. Idle appeared in the film as "Dirk McQuickly" (the Paul McCartney-styled character of the group), as well as the main commentator, while Innes appeared as "Ron Nasty" (the band's stand-in for John Lennon). Actors appearing in the film included Saturday Night Live's John Belushi, Bill Murray and Gilda Radner, as well as fellow Python Michael Palin, and also real musicians of the 1960s such as former Beatle George Harrison, as well as Mick Jagger and Paul Simon. Idle wrote and directed the Rutles comeback in 2008 for a live show Rutlemania! to celebrate the 30th anniversary. The performances took place in Los Angeles and New York City with a Beatles tribute band.

In 1986, Idle provided the voice of Wreck-Gar, the leader of the Junkions (a race of robots built out of junk that can only speak in film catchphrases and advertising slogans) in The Transformers: The Movie. In 1987, he took part in the English National Opera production of the Gilbert and Sullivan comic opera The Mikado, in which he appeared in the role of the Lord High Executioner, Ko-Ko; a performance of it was taped by Thames Television for broadcast, directed by John Michael Phillips, and subsequently released on DVD by A&E. In 1989, he appeared in the U.S. comedy television series Nearly Departed, about a ghost who haunts the family inhabiting his former home; the series lasted for six episodes as a summer replacement series.

"Idle has always, it seemed, been happy to have been a Python, happy to talk about Python, happy to revisit the group's glory days. Even though he has gone on to his own work – dozens of films, plays, TV shows, albums, books and screenplays – he is perhaps the most active standard-bearer for the group. It was Idle who toured extensively in 2000 and 2003, performing Python songs with a band and back-up singers. He went on the road with the Eric Idle Exploits Monty Python Tour, then with the Greedy Bastard Tour, which was documented extensively on the Python website he launched in 1996."

— Dave Eggers in The Guardian, September 2006.

Idle received good critical notices appearing in projects written and directed by others – such as Terry Gilliam's The Adventures of Baron Munchausen (1989), alongside Robbie Coltrane in Nuns on the Run (1990) and in Casper (1995). He also played Ratty in Terry Jones' version of The Wind in the Willows (1996). However, his own creative projects – such as the film Splitting Heirs (1993), a comedy he wrote, starred in and executive-produced – were mostly unsuccessful with critics and audiences.

In 1994, Idle appeared as Dr. Nigel Channing, chairman of the Imagination Institute and host of an 'Inventor of the Year' awards show in the three-dimensional film Honey, I Shrunk the Audience!, which was an attraction at the Imagination Pavilion at Walt Disney World's Epcot from 1994 until 2010 and at Disneyland from 1998 until 2010. The film also stars Rick Moranis and other members of the cast of the 1989 feature film Honey, I Shrunk the Kids. In 1999, he reprised the role in the short-lived second incarnation of the Journey into Imagination ride at Epcot, replacing Figment and Dreamfinder as the host. Due to an outcry from Disney fans, the attraction was reworked in 2001, reintroducing Figment into the ride while also retaining Idle's role as Nigel Channing. Idle is also writer and star of the 3-D film Pirates – 4D for Busch Entertainment Corporation.

In 1995, Idle appeared in Casper opposite Cathy Moriarty and voiced Rincewind the "Wizzard" in a computer adventure game based on Terry Pratchett's Discworld novels. In 1996, he reprised his role as Rincewind for the game's sequel, and composed and sang its theme song, "That's Death". In 1998, Idle appeared in the lead role in the poorly received film Burn Hollywood Burn. That same year, he also provided the voice of Devon, one of the heads of a two-headed dragon, with Don Rickles as the other head Cornwall, in the Warner Bros. animated film Quest for Camelot, and as Slyly, the albino Arctic fox in Rudolph the Red-Nosed Reindeer: The Movie.

In later years Idle provided voice work for animation, such as in South Park: Bigger, Longer & Uncut, in which he voiced Dr. Vosknocker. He has made four appearances on The Simpsons as documentarian Declan Desmond. Idle provided the voice of Merlin the magician in the DreamWorks animated film Shrek the Third (2007) with his former Python co-star John Cleese, who voiced King Harold. He also narrated the audiobook version of Charlie and the Chocolate Factory by Roald Dahl.

In late 2003, Idle began a performing tour of several American and Canadian cities entitled The Greedy Bastard Tour. The stage performances consisted largely of music from Monty Python episodes and films, along with some original post-Python material. In 2005, Idle released The Greedy Bastard Diary, a book detailing the things the cast and crew encountered during the three-month tour.

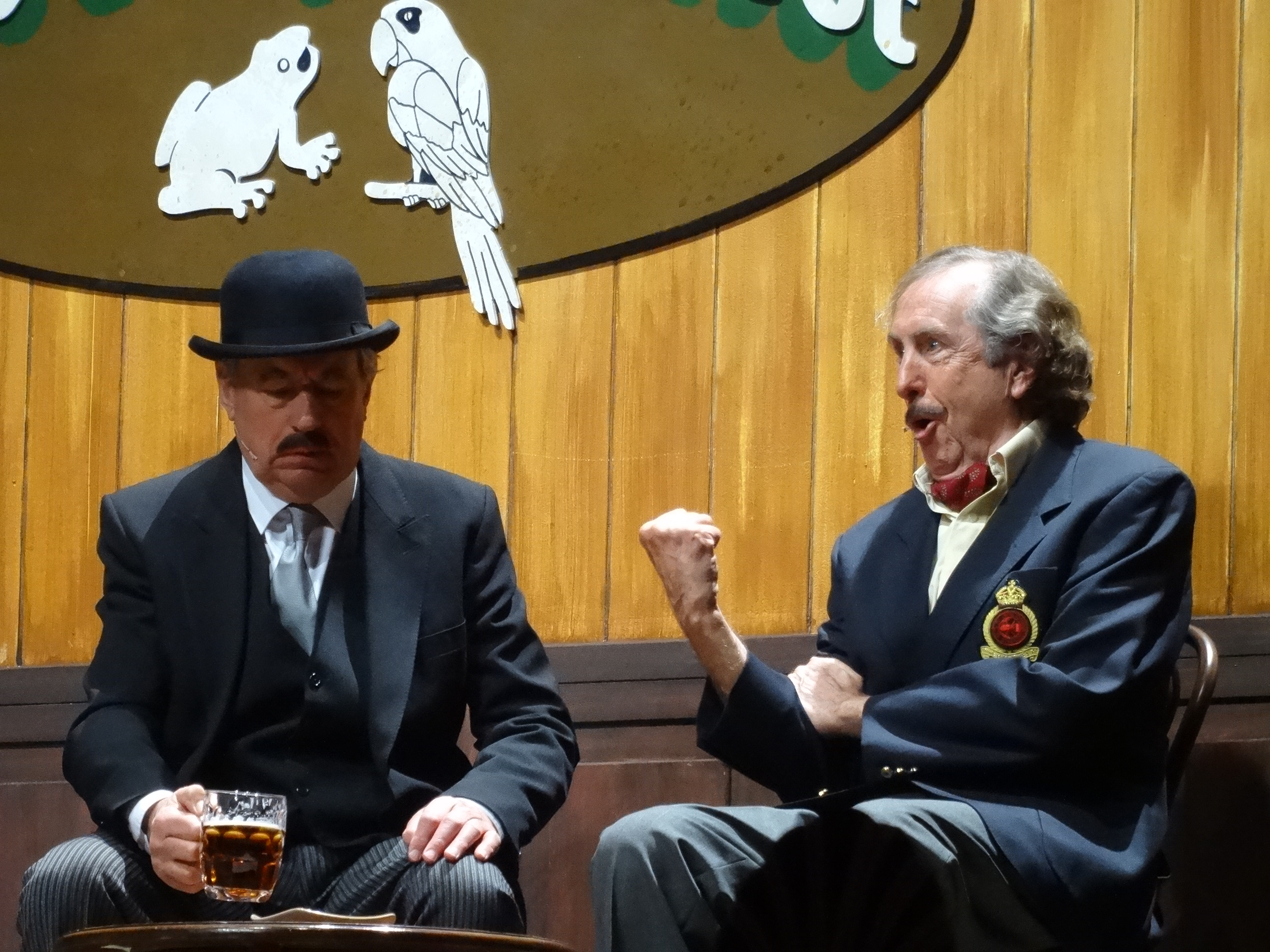
Idle (right) and Terry Jones performing the "Nudge Nudge" sketch at the Python reunion in 2014

In 2004, Idle created Spamalot, a musical comedy based on the 1975 film Monty Python and the Holy Grail. The medieval production tells the story of King Arthur and his Knights of the Round Table as they journey on their quest for the Holy Grail. Spamalot features a book and lyrics by Idle, music by Idle and John Du Prez, direction by Mike Nichols, and choreography by Casey Nicholaw.

Idle's play What About Dick? was given a staged reading at two public performances at the Ricardo Montalbán Theatre in Hollywood on 10–11 November 2007. The cast included Idle, Billy Connolly, Tim Curry, Eddie Izzard, Jane Leeves, Emily Mortimer, Jim Piddock and Tracey Ullman. The play returned on 26–29 April 2012 in the Orpheum Theatre, most of the cast returning except Emily Mortimer, who was replaced by Sophie Winkleman. Russell Brand also joined the cast. The play was made available for digital download on 13 November 2012.

Idle performed at the 2012 Summer Olympics closing ceremony at the Olympic Stadium in London on 12 August, singing "Always Look on the Bright Side of Life". He was the creator and director of the live show Monty Python Live (mostly) – One down, Five to go, which was performed at the O2 Arena, London, between 1 and 20 July 2014.

In December 2016, Idle was the writer and co-presenter of The Entire Universe, a "comedy and musical extravaganza with the help of Warwick Davis, Noel Fielding, Hannah Waddingham and Robin Ince, alongside a chorus of singers and dancers", broadcast by BBC Two.

In 2020, it was announced that Idle would adapt his script for Spamalot into a feature film for Paramount Pictures, with Nicholaw directing and Dan Jinks producing.

In 2022, Idle competed in season eight of The Masked Singer as "Hedgehog". He did a cover of the Beatles' "Love Me Do" with help from the USC Trojan Marching Band. When eliminated in the first episode alongside William Shatner as "Knight" and Chris Kirkpatrick as "Hummingbird", Idle mentioned to Nick Cannon that he had to get approval from Paul McCartney to do "Love Me Do" for a competition, in exchange for telling McCartney what the competition was so that he can avoid it. In addition, Idle did an unmasked performance of "Always Look on the Bright Side of Life" from Life of Brian.

In February 2024, Idle made headlines in the UK after revealing that he was still working at the age of 80 for financial reasons, saying "Python is a disaster. I never dreamed that at this age the income streams would tail off so disastrously", but also "I don't mind not being wealthy. I prefer being funny". In July 2025, he told NME in an interview that his relationship with the other Pythons was "poor to terrible", adding that "they don't talk to me. I haven't seen them for 10 years so it doesn't really matter. Apparently they say rude and nasty things but I don't read them." His first solo UK tour since 1973 was organised for later that year.

== Other credits ==
=== Writing ===
Idle has written several books, both fiction and non-fiction. His novels are Hello Sailor and The Road to Mars. In 1976, he produced a spin-off book to Rutland Weekend Television, titled The Rutland Dirty Weekend Book. In 1982, he wrote a West End farce Pass the Butler, starring Willie Rushton. During his Greedy Bastard Tour of 2003, he wrote the diaries that would be made into The Greedy Bastard Diary: A Comic Tour of America, published in February 2005.

Idle also wrote the book and co-wrote the music and lyrics for the musical Monty Python's Spamalot, based on the film Monty Python and the Holy Grail. It premiered in Chicago before moving to Broadway, where it received the Tony Award for Best Musical of the 2004–05 season. Idle won the Drama Desk Award for Outstanding Lyrics.

In a 2005 poll to find "The Comedians' Comedian" (UK), he was voted 21 in the top 50 greatest comedy acts ever by fellow comedians and comedy insiders.

=== Songwriting ===
Idle is a songwriter with about 150 songs to his credit. He composed and performed many of Pythons' most famous comic pieces, including "Eric the Half-a-Bee", "The Philosophers' Song", "Galaxy Song", "Penis Song" and, probably his most recognised hit, "Always Look on the Bright Side of Life", which was written for the closing scene of the Monty Python film Life of Brian, and sung from the crosses during the mass crucifixion. The song has since been covered by Harry Nilsson, Bruce Cockburn, Art Garfunkel, and Green Day. Idle, his fellow Pythons and assorted family and friends performed the song at Graham Chapman's memorial service. Idle performed the song at the closing ceremony of the London 2012 Olympic Games on 12 August 2012 and as the farewell song of the last show of the Python's reunion at the O2 arena, 20 July 2014.

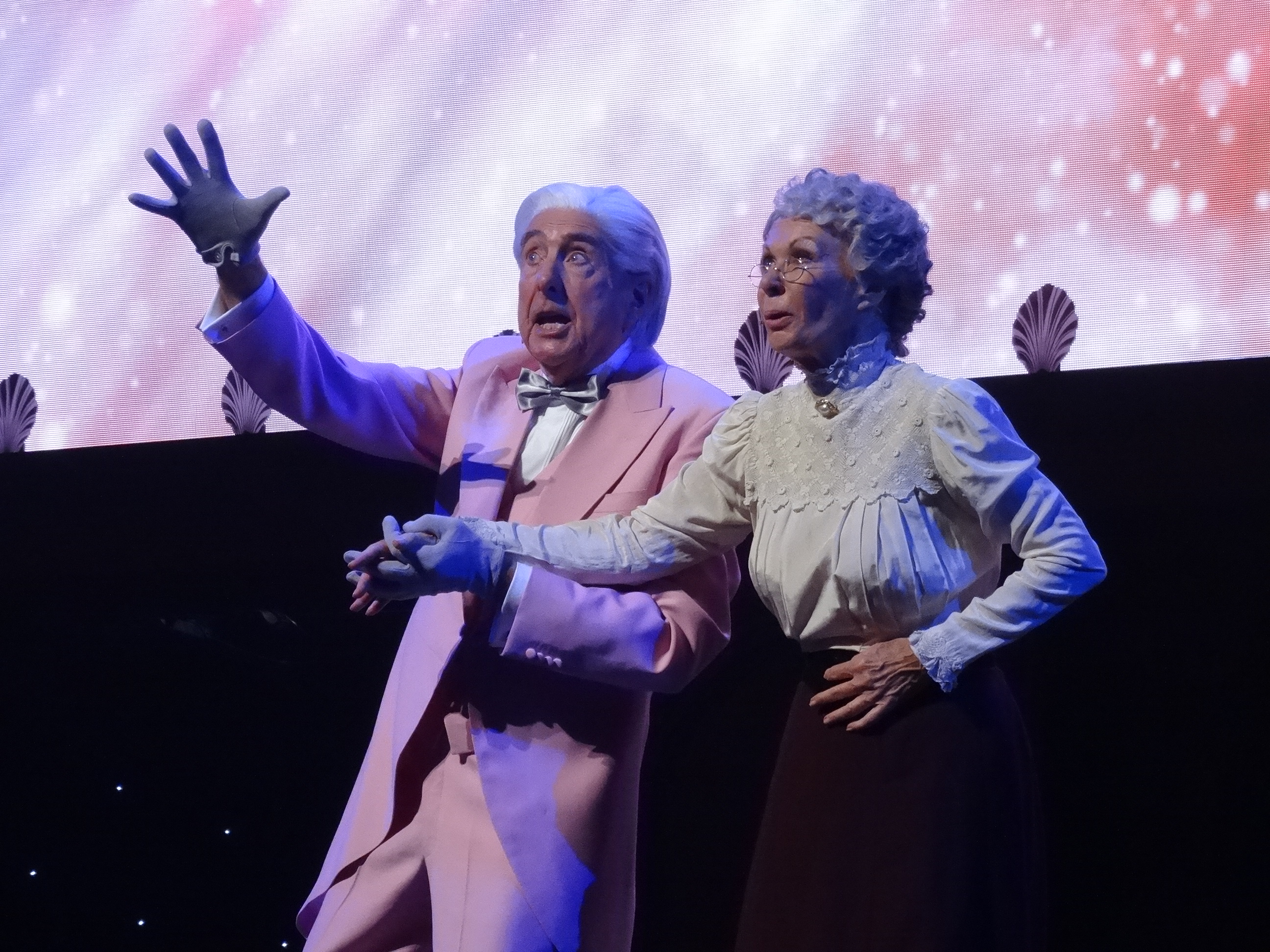
Idle (left) and Carol Cleveland performing the "Galaxy Song" (from Monty Python's The Meaning of Life) at Monty Python Live (Mostly) in 2014

As Ko-Ko in the 1987 English National Opera production of The Mikado, Idle wrote his own 'Little List' on "As some day it may happen". In 1989, Idle co-wrote and sang the theme tune to the popular British sitcom One Foot in the Grave and although the series became immensely popular, the song did poorly in the charts.

When "Always Look on the Bright Side of Life" was adopted as a football chant in the late 1980s, Idle's then neighbour Gary Lineker suggested Idle re-record and release the popular track. With help from BBC Radio 1 breakfast show host Simon Mayo, who gave the song regular airplay and also used the chorus within a jingle, it became a hit, some 12 years after the song's original appearance in Life of Brian, reaching number 3 in the UK charts and landing Idle a set on Top of the Pops in October 1991. The following month Idle, accompanied by opera singer Ann Howard, sang the song at the Royal Variety Performance. He recorded a special version for Mayo's own use on air ("Come on Simon, get another song on now; why don't you put on a nice Cliff Richard record?") and changed the line "life's a piece of shit" to "life's a piece of spit" in order to get daytime airplay on radio.

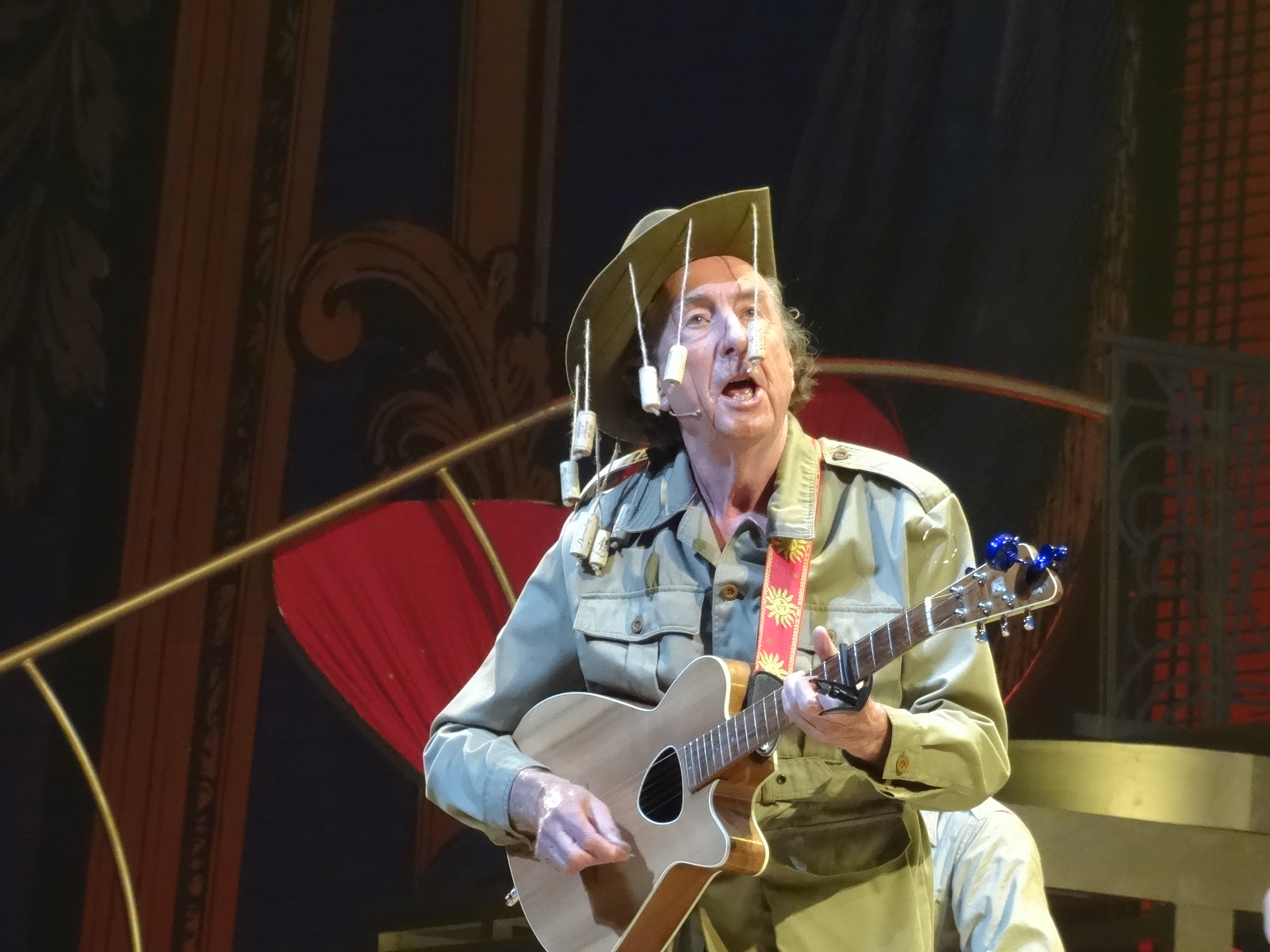
Idle performing "Bruces sketch" in 2014. Involving stereotypical "ocker" Australians, Idle said he based it on his Australian friends from the 1960s "who always seemed to be called Bruce".

In 2004, Idle recorded a protest song of sorts, the "FCC Song", in which he lambasts the U.S. FCC for fining him $5,000 for saying "fuck" on national radio. The song contains 14 uses of the word.

In the same year, the musical comedy Spamalot debuted in Chicago; it opened in New York's Shubert Theatre on 14 February 2005. Idle wrote the lyrics and book for Spamalot, collaborating with John Du Prez on much of the music. The original 2005 Broadway theatre production was nominated for 14 Tony Awards and won three: Best Musical, Best Performance by a Featured Actress in a Musical (Sara Ramirez), and Best Direction of a Musical (Mike Nichols).

In 2006 he wrote, produced and performed the song "Really Nice Day" for the movie The Wild.

In June 2007, Not the Messiah, a comic oratorio by Idle and Du Prez. premiered at the inaugural Luminato arts festival in Toronto. Idle performed live during this 50-minute oratorio, along with the Toronto Symphony Orchestra and members of the Toronto Mendelssohn Choir. Du Prez was also present. Shannon Mercer, Jean Stilwell, Christopher Sieber, and Theodore Baerg sang the principal parts. The American premiere was at Caramoor (Westchester County, New York) on 1 July 2007. Soloists were the same as in the Toronto performance, but the accompanying chorus was made up of members of New York City's Collegiate Chorale. The show was revised and expanded for a tour of Australia and New Zealand in 2007, including two sell-out nights at the Sydney Opera House. A tour during the summer of 2008 included performances with the National Symphony Orchestra at Wolf Trap National Park for the Performing Arts, the Los Angeles Philharmonic at the Hollywood Bowl in Los Angeles, and the Delaware Symphony Orchestra at the Mann Center for the Performing Arts in Philadelphia.

Idle contributed a cover of Buddy Holly's "Raining in My Heart" for the tribute album Listen to Me: Buddy Holly, released 6 September 2011. He also wrote and sang a variant of the "Galaxy Song" for Professor Brian Cox's show Wonders of Life, as well as the new theme for Cox's radio show The Infinite Monkey Cage.

== Personal life ==
Idle has been married twice. His first marriage was in 1969 to actress Lyn Ashley, with whom he had one son before their divorce in 1975. He met Tania Kosevich, a former model, in 1977 and they married in 1981. They had a daughter. From 1995 they lived in a five-bedroom, 7,000-square-foot (650 m^{2}) mansion in the Hollywood Hills, which they sold in 2023 owing to financial difficulty. Idle has held permanent residency in the United States since about 1997. During and because of Donald Trump's second presidency, Idle was strongly critical of Trump in a question-and-answer session, saying, after permanent residents (and citizens) were deported after criticising the Trump presidency, "I'd be proud to be thrown out because I'd be in very select company. The last English comedian to be thrown out of America for political reasons was Charlie Chaplin."

Idle is a first cousin of Canadian conductor Peter Oundjian. David Bowie made Idle godfather to his son, film director Duncan Jones.

Idle is an atheist, but does not like using the term and is quoted as saying "I don't like that word, it implies that there's a God not to believe in."

In 2019, Idle was diagnosed with pancreatic cancer. He was diagnosed early and underwent successful surgery to remove the tumour, needing no further treatment after this procedure.

As of 2024, Idle lived in Los Angeles, US.

In 2025, he said that he did not watch comedy and watched very little, mainly Netflix thrillers. "I don't go to the movies because they're very boring and for 12-year-olds. I don't watch news and I don't read newspapers."

== Tributes ==
- An asteroid, 9620 Ericidle, is named in his honour.
- The default Integrated development environment (IDE) of the programming language Python is called IDLE. Although officially IDLE stands for "Integrated DeveLopment Environment", the name was chosen in allusion to Eric Idle, as the name of the programming language Python itself was chosen in allusion to Monty Python.

== Filmography ==
=== Film ===
| Year | Title | Role | Notes |
|---|---|---|---|
| 1971 | And Now for Something Completely Different | Various roles | Also co-writer |
| 1975 | Monty Python and the Holy Grail | Various roles | Also co-writer |
| 1979 | Monty Python's Life of Brian | Various roles | Also co-writer |
| 1982 | Monty Python Live at the Hollywood Bowl | Various roles | Concert film; also co-writer |
| 1983 | Monty Python's The Meaning of Life | Various roles | Also co-writer |
| 1983 | Yellowbeard | Commander Clement | |
| 1985 | National Lampoon's European Vacation | The Bike Rider | |
| 1986 | The Transformers: The Movie | Wreck-Gar | Voice |
| 1988 | The Adventures of Baron Munchausen | Berthold / Desmond | |
| 1990 | Nuns on the Run | Brian Hope | |
| 1990 | Too Much Sun | Sonny | |
| 1992 | Mom and Dad Save the World | King Raff | |
| 1992 | Missing Pieces | Wendel | |
| 1993 | Splitting Heirs | Tommy Butterfly Rainbow Peace Patel | Also writer and executive producer |
| 1994 | Honey, I Shrunk the Audience! | Dr. Nigel Channing | 4D Short film Attraction at Disney Parks |
| 1995 | Casper | Paul "Dibs" Plutzker | |
| 1996 | The Wind in the Willows | Mr. Rat | |
| 1997 | Pirates 4-D | Pierre | Short film; also writer |
| 1998 | An Alan Smithee Film: Burn Hollywood Burn | Alan Smithee | |
| 1998 | The Secret of NIMH 2: Timmy to the Rescue | Evil Martin | Voice, direct-to-video |
| 1998 | Quest for Camelot | Devon | Voice |
| 1998 | Rudolph the Red-Nosed Reindeer: The Movie | Slyly | Voice |
| 1999 | Dudley Do-Right | Prospector Kim J. Darling | |
| 1999 | South Park: Bigger, Longer & Uncut | Dr. Vosnocker | Voice cameo |
| 2000 | 102 Dalmatians | Waddlesworth | Voice |
| 2002 | Pinocchio | Medoro | English dub |
| 2003 | Concert for George | Himself / Barber / Mountie | Documentary |
| 2003 | Hollywood Homicide | The Celebrity | Cameo |
| 2004 | Ella Enchanted | Narrator | Voice |
| 2004 | The Nutcracker and the Mouse King | Drosselmeyer | Voice, direct-to-video; English dub |
| 2005 | The Aristocrats | Himself | Documentary |
| 2006 | The Wild | Wildebeest | Composer/performer: "Really Nice Day" |
| 2007 | Shrek the Third | Merlin | Voice |
| 2008 | Delgo | Spig | Voice |
| 2014 | Monty Python Live (Mostly) | Various roles | Concert film; also writer and director |
| 2014 | The Boxtrolls | | Composer: "The Boxtrolls Song" |
| 2015 | Absolutely Anything | Salubrious Gat | Voice |

=== Television ===
| Year | Title | Role | Notes |
|---|---|---|---|
| 1967–1969 | Do Not Adjust Your Set | Various roles | 27 episodes; also writer |
| 1967–1970 | No – That's Me Over Here! | Various roles | Co-creator and writer |
| 1968 | We Have Ways of Making You Laugh | Various roles | 12 episodes |
| 1969–1974 | Monty Python's Flying Circus | Various roles | 45 episodes; also co-creator and writer |
| 1972 | Monty Python's Fliegender Zirkus | Various roles | 2 episodes; also co-creator and writer |
| 1975–1976 | Rutland Weekend Television | Dirk McQuickly / Various roles | 14 episodes; also creator and writer |
| 1976–1979 | Saturday Night Live | Himself | 6 Episodes |
| 1978 | All You Need Is Cash | Dirk McQuickly / The Narrator / Stanley J. Krammerhead III, Jr | Television film; also writer and director |
| 1981 | Laverne & Shirley | Derek DeWoods | Episode: "I Do, I Do" |
| 1982 | Faerie Tale Theatre | Narrator | Episode: "The Tale of the Frog Prince"; also director and writer |
| 1985 | Faerie Tale Theatre | The Pied Piper | Episode: "The Pied Piper of Hamelin" |
| 1989 | Around the World in 80 Days | Jean Passepartout | 3 episodes |
| 1989 | Nearly Departed | Grant Pritchard | 6 episodes |
| 1991 | One Foot in the Grave | Mervyn Whale | Episode: "The Man in the Long Black Coat" |
| 1996 | Frasier | Chuck | Voice, episode: "High Crane Drifter" |
| 1998 | Monty Python Live at Aspen | Himself | Television special |
| 1998 | Pinky and the Brain | Pinky's Mom and Dad | Voice, episodes: "The Family That Poits Together, Narfs Together" |
| 1998 | The Angry Beavers | Spanque | Voice, episode: "Dumbwaiters" |
| 1998–1999 | Hercules | Mr. Parentheses | Voice, 11 episodes |
| 1998–1999 | Recess | Galileo | Voice, 2 episodes |
| 1999–2000 | Suddenly Susan | Ian Maxtone-Graham | 22 episodes |
| 2000 | Buzz Lightyear of Star Command | Guzelian | Voice, episode: "War and Peace and War" |
| 2001–2002 | House of Mouse | Pluto Angel | Voice, 2 episodes |
| 2002 | MADtv | Zookeeper | Episode: "#8.18" |
| 2002 | The Rutles 2: Can't Buy Me Lunch | Narrator / Various | Television film; also writer, director and producer |
| 2002 | The Scream Team | Coffin Ed | Television film |
| 2003 | National Lampoon's Christmas Vacation 2 | Plane passenger | Television film |
| 2003–2012 | The Simpsons | Declan Desmond | Voice, 4 episodes |
| 2004–2005 | Super Robot Monkey Team Hyperforce Go! | Scrapperton | Voice, 3 episodes |
| 2016 | The Entire Universe | Himself (host) | Television special; also writer |
| 2022 | The Masked Singer | Himself/Hedgehog | Eliminated in first episode |
| 2025 | This Morning | Guest presenter | |

=== Theatre ===
| Year | Title | Role | Notes |
|---|---|---|---|
| 2000 | Seussical | | Co-conceiver |
| 2004 | Spamalot | | Writer and co-lyricist |
| 2007 | Not the Messiah | Various roles | Also writer |
| 2009 | An Evening Without Monty Python | | Director |
| 2012 | What About Dick? | Piano | Also writer and co-director |
| 2013 | The Pirates of Penzance | Sergeant of Police | Delacorte Theatre Concert |
| 2014 | Monty Python Live (Mostly) | Various roles | Also co-writer and director |
| 2015 | Spamalot | Historian | Hollywood Bowl |

=== Video games ===
| Year | Title | Role | Notes |
|---|---|---|---|
| 1995 | Discworld | Rincewind | Voice |
| 1996 | Discworld II: Missing Presumed...!? | Rincewind | Voice |
| 1996 | Monty Python & the Quest for the Holy Grail | Various roles | Voice; Also producer and writer |
| 1997 | Monty Python's The Meaning of Life | Various roles | Voice |

=== Theme park attractions ===
| Year | Title | Role | Notes |
|---|---|---|---|
| 1994 | Honey, I Shrunk the Audience! | Dr. Nigel Channing | |
| 2002 | Journey into Imagination with Figment | Dr. Nigel Channing | Also hosted 1999 version |

== Awards and nominations ==
| Association | Year | Category | Project | Result | Ref. |
|---|---|---|---|---|---|
| Grammy Awards | 1976 | Best Comedy Album | The Monty Python Matching Tie and Handkerchief | Nominated | |
| Grammy Awards | 1981 | Best Comedy Album | Monty Python's Contractual Obligation Album | Nominated | |
| Grammy Awards | 1984 | Best Comedy Album | Monty Python's The Meaning of Life | Nominated | |
| Grammy Awards | 1998 | Best Spoken Word Album for Children | The Owl and the Pussy-Cat | Nominated | |
| Grammy Awards | 2004 | Best Spoken Word Album for Children | Charlie and the Chocolate Factory | Nominated | |
| Grammy Awards | 2006 | Best Musical Theater Album | Monty Python's Spamalot | Won | |
| Tony Awards | 2005 | Best Musical | Spamalot | Won | |
| Tony Awards | 2005 | Best Book of a Musical | Spamalot | Nominated | |
| Tony Awards | 2005 | Best Original Score | Spamalot | Nominated | |
| Drama Desk Award | 2005 | Outstanding Lyrics | Spamalot | Won | |
| Drama Desk Award | 2005 | Outstanding Book of a Musical | Spamalot | Nominated | |

== Bibliography ==
- Hello Sailor, novel, 1975, Weidenfeld & Nicolson, ISBN 0-297-76929-4
- The Rutland Dirty Weekend Book, 1976, Mandarin ISBN 0-413-36570-0
- Pass the Butler, play script, 1982, ISBN 0-413-49990-1
- The Quite Remarkable Adventures of the Owl and the Pussycat, children's book, 1996, Dove Books, ISBN 0-7871-1042-6
- The Road to Mars, novel, 1998, ISBN 0-7522-2414-X, Boxtree (hardcover), ISBN 0-375-70312-8 (paperback)
- Eric Idle Exploits Monty Python Souvenir Program, Green Street Press (U.S.), 2000
- The Greedy Bastard Tour Souvenir Program, Green Street Press (U.S.), 2003
- The Greedy Bastard Diary: A Comic Tour of America, journal, 2005, ISBN 0-06-075864-3
- The Writer's Cut, e-Book, 2015, ISBN 9781910859247
- Always Look on the Bright Side of Life: A Sortabiography, memoir, 2018, ISBN 9781984822581
- The Spamalot Diaries, Diary, 2024
- Idle in Provence: A Brief History of Thyme, 2026, Harper Select
