= Cheese Shop sketch =

Monty Python sketch

The "Cheese Shop" is a sketch from Monty Python's Flying Circus.

It originally appeared in episode 33, "Salad Days" on 30 November, 1972. The script for the sketch is included in the 1989 book The Complete Monty Python's Flying Circus: All the Words, Volume 2.

It was later reworked for the album The Monty Python Matching Tie and Handkerchief and appeared for one last time during Monty Python Live (Mostly), as a surprising coda to the Dead Parrot sketch.

== Origins ==
The idea for the sketch came after a day of shooting in Folkestone Harbour, where John Cleese became seasick and vomited repeatedly while trying to deliver a line. During the drive back, Graham Chapman recommended that Cleese eat something and asked him what he wanted; Cleese replied that he fancied a piece of cheese. Upon seeing a chemist's shop, Cleese pondered whether the shop would sell cheese, to which Chapman responded that if they did it would be medicinal cheese and that Cleese would need a prescription to buy some. Giggling, they decided to write a sketch based on that idea. However, on starting to write it, they concluded that asking for cheese in a chemist's shop was too unrealistic without being set up. Wondering why someone would attempt to buy cheese somewhere other than a cheese shop, Cleese thought that they should write a sketch about someone attempting to buy cheese in a cheese shop that had no cheese whatsoever to set up a sketch revolving around someone attempting to buy cheese at a chemist's which never wound up happening.

Chapman then wrote the sketch with Cleese, who did not initially find it humorous. When Chapman insisted that it was funny, they presented it at a reading for the other Python members. Though most of the other Pythons were also unimpressed, Michael Palin loved it and laughed hysterically, eventually falling to the floor. This amused the others and they agreed to use the sketch.

== Summary ==
Cleese plays an erudite customer (Mr. Mousebender in the script) attempting to purchase some cheese from "Ye Old Cheese Emporium, purveyor of fine cheese to the gentry (and the poverty-stricken too)". The proprietor (Palin), Mr. Arthur Wensleydale (Henry Wensleydale in the TV version), appears to have nothing in stock, not even cheddar, "the single most popular cheese in the world". A slow crescendo of bouzouki music plays in the background performed by Joe Moretti, as Terry Jones and Graham Chapman dance while dressed in bowler hats and business suits. Cleese initially expresses appreciation of the music, being "one who delights in all manifestations of the Terpsichorean Muse", but as the sketch progresses it mirrors Cleese's growing frustration until he loudly demands the music cease. As Cleese lists increasingly obscure, unsavoury, and, in one instance fictional, cheeses to no avail, the proprietor offers weak excuses such as "Ohh! The cat's eaten it." Cleese remarks that it is not much of a cheese shop, but Palin insists it is the best in the district due to its cleanliness, to which Cleese replies "Well, it's certainly uncontaminated by cheese." Eventually, Cleese asks if Palin has any cheese at all, to which Palin replies "Yes.". Cleese then tells him that he will ask the question again, and if Palin says "no", he will shoot him "through" the head. Palin answers "no" the second time, and Cleese immediately shoots him, then muses, "What a senseless waste of human life!" He then puts on a Stetson, and the sketch segues into Hugh Walpole's Rogue Cheddar and a link to the Sam Peckinpah's "Salad Days" sketch.

== Cheeses ==
Forty-three cheeses are mentioned in the original sketch. In the audio version on The Monty Python Matching Tie and Handkerchief album and other live and recorded versions, Cleese also mentions Greek feta. In the 2014 reunion show Monty Python Live (Mostly), Stinking Bishop, Armenian string cheese and Zimbabwean rhinoceros milk cheese were also added to the list. "Venezuelan Beaver Cheese", mentioned in the original as well as future versions, is a fictitious type of cheese.

Mentioned in original sketch
Not mentioned in original sketch
Mentioned together in one sentence, with only one reply

Cheese	Source
Red Leicester	Original
Tilsit	Original
Caerphilly	Original
Bel Paese	Original
Red Windsor	Original
Stilton	Original
Gruyère	Original
Emmental	Original
Norwegian Jarlsberg	Original
Liptauer	Original
Lancashire	Original
White Stilton	Original
Danish Blue	Original
Double Gloucester	Original
Cheshire	Original
Dorset Blue Vinney	Original
Brie	Original
Roquefort	Original
Pont l'Evêque	Original
Port Salut	Original
Savoyard	Original
Saint-Paulin	Original
Carré de l'Est	Original
Boursin	Original
Bresse-Bleu	Original
Perle de Champagne	Original
Camembert	Original
Gouda	Original
Edam	Original
Caithness	Original
Smoked Austrian	Original
Sage Derby	Original
Wensleydale	Original
Greek feta	MT&H
Gorgonzola	Original
Parmesan	Original
Mozzarella	Original
Pipo Crem	Original
Danish Fynbo	Original
Czechoslovak sheep's milk cheese	Original
Venezuelan beaver cheese	Original
Cheddar	Original
Ilchester	Original
Limburger	Original
Stinking Bishop	Live (Mostly)
Any cheese at all	Original

== Pastiches and parodies ==
- The sketch was reworked for The Brand New Monty Python Bok, becoming a two-player word game in which one player must keep naming different cheeses while the other player must keep coming up with different excuses; otherwise, "the Customer wins and may punch the Shopkeeper in the teeth".
- The "Weird Al" Yankovic song "Albuquerque" parodies the sketch by portraying a similar situation in a doughnut shop. The scene ends when the shopkeeper reveals that all he has is a "box of one dozen starving, crazed weasels"; the main character purchases and opens it and is attacked by the creatures inside.
- A wheel of Le Brouère cheese was flown aboard the first SpaceX Dragon 1 reusable space capsule on 8 December 2010 in reference to this sketch. The presence of the space cheese was made known the day after the successful flight.
- The Young Ones episode Time, features a parody of the sketch. Alexei Sayle (playing the customer), asks the shop attendant whether they have any cheese. When the attendant replies he doesn't, Sayle says "Well that's that sketch knackered then, innit?".
- The Dungeons & Dragons themed webcomic The Order of the Stick parodies the sketch in strip number 136, entitled "It's Not a Gaming Session Until Someone Quotes Monty Python," in which Roy Greenhilt, the strip's protagonist, attempts to buy a new weapon from a shopkeeper who keeps listing excuses as to why he does not have any polearm weaponry in stock.
- In the Video Game Leisure Suit Larry - Love for Sail, the player has to milk beavers in order to then make venezuelan beaver cheese.

== See also ==
- List of British cheeses
- Smackout
- Olympia Cafe
