= Larrikin =

Mischievous young person, in Australian English

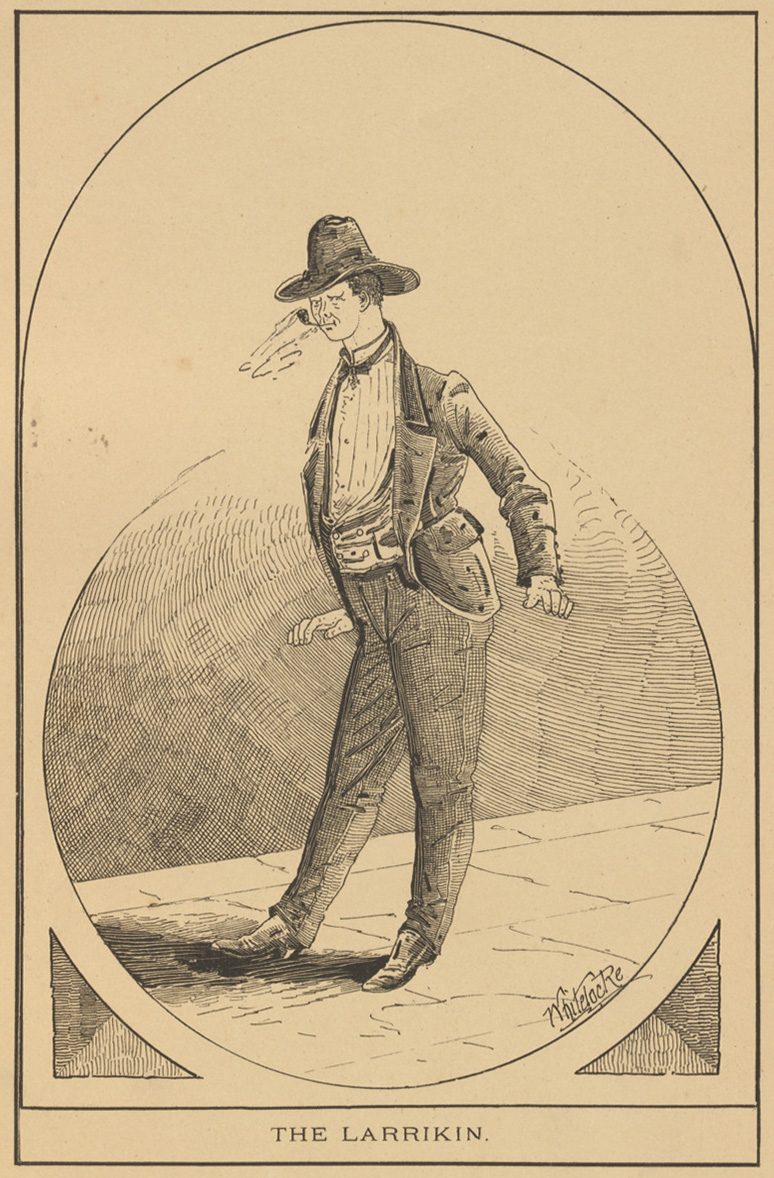
Depiction of a larrikin, from Nelson P. Whitelocke's book A Walk in Sydney Streets on the Shady Side (1885)

Larrikin is an Australian English term meaning "a mischievous young person, an uncultivated, rowdy but good-hearted person", or "a person who acts with apparent disregard for social or political conventions".

In the 19th and early 20th centuries, the term generally meant "a lout, a hoodlum" or "a young urban rough, a hooligan", meanings which became obsolete.

== Etymology ==
The word larrikin was a dialect term originating from the West Midlands region of England (particularly the counties of Worcestershire and Warwickshire). It was also related to the verb to larrack in the Yorkshire dialect, meaning 'to lark about'. While larrikin eventually fell into disuse in its place of origin, the word started to become widely used in the streets of Melbourne from the late 1860s.

The term larrikin was reported in an English dialect dictionary in 1905, referring to "a mischievous or frolicsome youth".

== Evolution of larrikin culture ==
A letter to the editor of the Geelong Advertiser in November 1870, complaining of the "larrikin nuisance" on the market reserve in Geelong, described the typical behaviour of larrikins as engaging in "rows and fights", obstructing the footpath and employing "the foulest and most blasphemous language, frequently to passers-by".

Commentators have noted the larrikin streak in Australian culture, and have theorised about its origins. Some say that larrikinism arose as a reaction to corrupt, arbitrary authority during Australia's convict era, or as a reaction to norms of propriety imposed by officials from Britain on the young country. The term was used to describe members of the street gangs that operated in Sydney at the time, for example the Rocks Push – a criminal gang in The Rocks in Sydney during the late 19th and early 20th centuries – who were noted for their antisocial behaviour and gang-specific dress codes. In the late 19th century, one Melbourne newspaper, The Leader, claimed that police records showed nearly all the larrikins were the product of Catholic schools.

An October 1947 editorial in The Australian Women's Weekly equated larrikinism with various forms of vandalism, including arson: "They are the people who leave their picnic fires smouldering, and start blazes that deal the final blow to green loveliness", and defacing monuments, "A similar larrikin streak sends louts into city parks to shy stones at monuments and chip noses off statuary".

=== Affectionate colloquial usage ===
During the twentieth century, the larrikin evolved from a figure associated with working-class violence and delinquency into a more affectionate symbol of Australian identity. Historian Michelle Smith argues that literature at the turn of the century helped rehabilitate larrikins by portraying them as "endearing, distinctly Australian, and ground down by poverty". This shift was reinforced by the popular representation of the "larrikin digger" during World War I, which helped establish the cheeky, irreverent larrikin as a recognisable Australian cultural figure.

In 1965, Australian swimmer Dawn Fraser was banned from competition by the Australian Swimming Union for various incidents at the previous year's Summer Olympics. Fraser was later described as having a "larrikin streak" as well as being an "iconic figure", and was appointed an Officer of the Order of Australia in 1988.

The evolution of larrikinism in Australia is summarised in the publisher's description of a 2012 book by Melissa Bellanta, Larrikins: A History:

From the true-blue Crocodile Hunter to the blue humour of Stiffy and Mo, from the Beaconsfield miners to The Sentimental Bloke, Australia has often been said to possess a 'larrikin streak'. Today, being a larrikin has positive connotations and we think of it as the key to unlocking the Australian identity: a bloke who refuses to stand on ceremony and is a bit of a scallywag. When it first emerged around 1870, however, 'larrikin' was a term of abuse, used to describe teenage working-class hell-raisers who populated dance halls and cheap theatres. Crucially, the early larrikins were female as well as male.

=== Larrikinism in wartime ===
When the First World War broke out, larrikinism became closely connected to diggers (Australian soldiers), and remains part of the Anzac legend. The notion of larrikinism acquired positive meaning and it became a term of admiration. Indiscipline within the AIF (Australian Imperial Force) was often portrayed as harmless larrikinism that continued in folklore and anecdote. "After the armistice these larrikin digger characters were increasingly celebrated as quintessentially Australian. The idea that the real Australian was a bit of a larrikin crystallized."

== Female larrikins ==
While larrikinism was defined during the colonial era mainly "as a problem of male violence", females were also present among larrikin gangs. Colonial larrikin girls could be just as vulgar as larrikin boys; some of the girls even took pleasure in exhibiting masculine qualities. These girls often engaged in violent behaviour, smashed windows, sang songs with obscene lyrics and had no desire to become "respectable" women.

== See also ==
- Australian English
- Bogan
- Ocker
- Wowser
