= Fynbo =

Semi-hard Danish cheese

- Country of origin: Denmark
- Source of milk: cow
- Pasteurized: yes
- Texture: semi-hard
- Fat content: 34%
- Weight: 2 kg
- Named after: Funen

Fynbo is a semi-hard Danish cheese named after the inhabitants of the island of Fyn.

Fynbo cheese has a flavor of buckwheat and is processed with a combination of mesophilic and thermophilic bacterial cultures. Experiments with secondary proteolysis of Fynbo have helped to identify an important peptide produced during cheese ripening, αs1-casein (f1-23).

== In popular culture ==
Fynbo cheese was mentioned in Monty Python's Cheese Shop sketch.

== See also ==
- List of cheeses
