= Ewen Gilmour =

New Zealand comedian and television presenter (1963–2014)

David Ewen Gilmour (22 January 1963 – 3 October 2014), commonly known as Ewen Gilmour, was a New Zealand comedian and television presenter. Usually sporting long brown hair with a goatee and wearing a jacket and jeans, he was a self-described Westie.

== Comedy and television career ==
Gilmour began his comedy career in 1995, and shared the first Billy T Award with Cal Wilson in 1997 for his show Once Were Westies. He won the Decade Award – Best Male Comedian – 2000 to 2010 at the 2010 NZ Comedy Guild Awards. In 2012, he returned to the New Zealand International Comedy Festival "for the first time in a couple of years" with a one-hour show called "S'Truth".

He made numerous appearances on New Zealand television, including Pulp Comedy (1995), Intrepid Journeys – Peru (2003), Celebrity Treasure Island (2003), Dancing with the Stars series one (2005), and Comedy Christmas Cracker (2010). He was the host of the TV3 show Road Madness, mainly about dangerous driving on New Zealand roads, which first aired in 2012.

== Personal life ==
His wife Catherine Gilmour died on 19 February 2011 at age 36 after a long battle with cancer. Ewen Gilmour resigned from his position at Waitakere City Council in August 2007, after his wife's brain tumor was removed in 2006, so he could care for her.

He was also a marriage and civil union celebrant.

Gilmour died in his sleep at Port Waikato on 3 October 2014, aged 51.

== See also ==
- List of New Zealand television personalities
