= Gutter punk =

Punk subculture

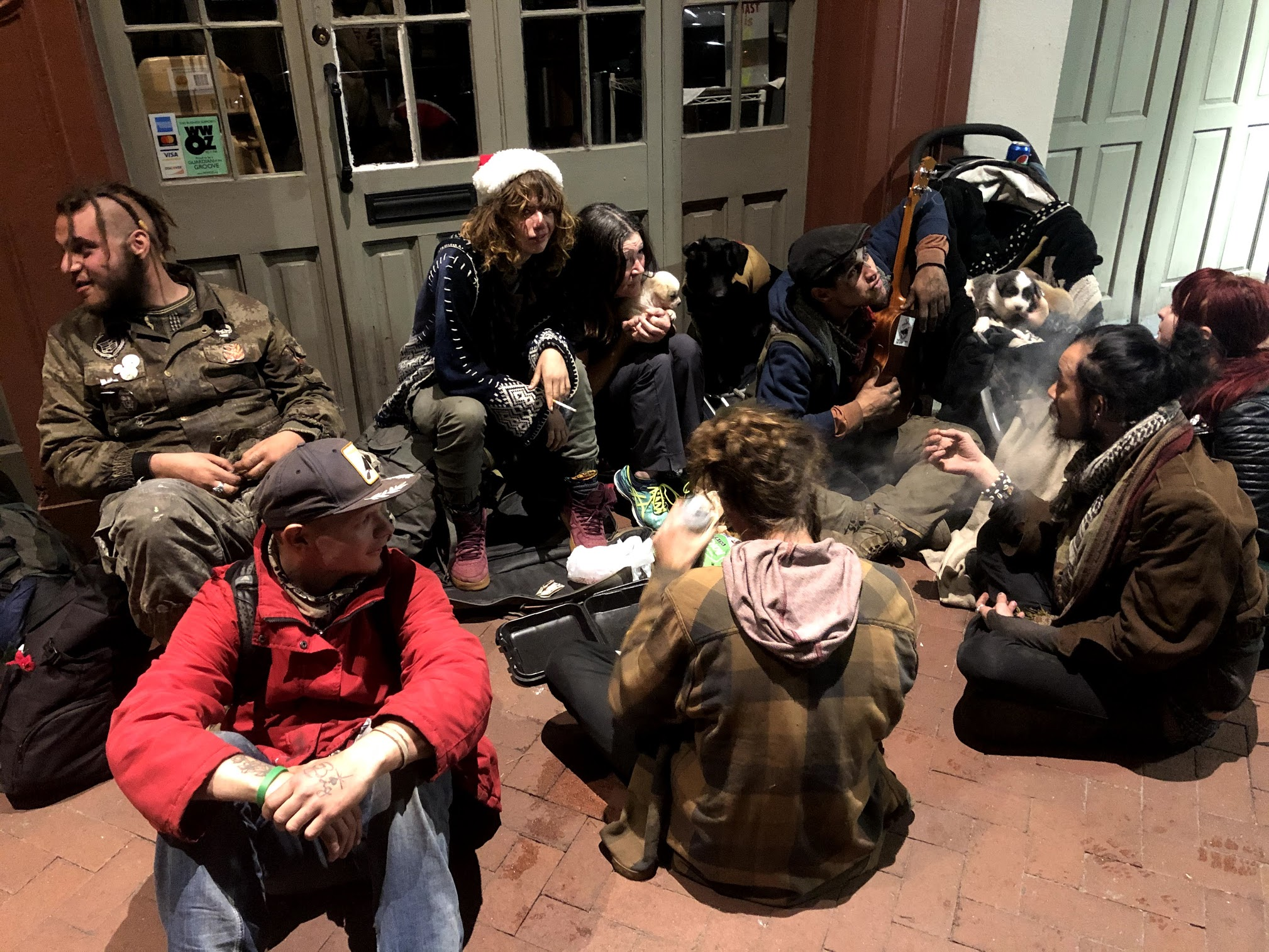
A group of gutter punks in New Orleans, Louisiana, in December 2019

A gutter punk is a homeless or transient individual who displays a variety of specific lifestyle traits and characteristics that often, but not always, are associated with the punk subculture. Attributes may include unkempt dreadlocks, nose rings, Mohawk hairstyles, and tattooed faces. Gutter punks are sometimes referred to as "crusties", "crust punks", "traveler kids", "traveling punks", "punk hobos", or simply "travelers", among other terms. Some self-identified gutter punks may distinguish themselves from "crust punks" and "travellers", and vice versa; however, there is considerable overlap between the groups, and the terms are often used interchangeably.

== Nomenclature ==
In addition to the term "gutter punk", members of the gutter punk subculture may also be described as "crusties", "crusty punks", "crust kids", "crusty kids", or "crust punks".

Other terms used to describe gutter punks include "travelers", "anarcho-punks" (however, this term may also be used to describe any punk in general who identifies with anarchism, not just gutter punks, while some gutter punks may in fact not be ideologically or politically subscribed to anarchist philosophy); "traveling punks" or "traveler punks"; "traveling kids", "traveler kids", or "travel kids"; "punk hobos", "hobo-punks" / "hobo punks", or simply "modern-day hobos"; "transient punks", "punk nomads", "road kids", "gutter pirates", "street punks", "dirty kids", "train hoppers" or "railriders" (in reference to the common gutter punk practice of freighthopping); "punk à chiens" (in Francophone regions, lit. 'dog punk'); "punkabbestia" (in Italy, lit. 'beast punk'); and "oogles". Certain terms used to describe the subculture may not be used by gutter punks themselves, or may in fact refer to related or similar but somewhat different subcultures. "Oogle", while sometimes used to describe gutter punks in general, is often used by gutter punks themselves to describe members of the subculture whom they perceive as "poseurs" or inauthentic.

"Scumfuck" or "scum fuck" may be used, especially among gutter punks, to refer to certain members of the gutter punk subculture who are perceived as selfish, apathetic, violent, aggressive, overly nihilistic, or overly hedonistic. Scumfucks are often labeled as heavy alcohol and drug users with overtly macho tendencies, and they are generally more apolitical than other members of the gutter punk subculture. The notorious punk musician GG Allin was known to use the term to describe himself.

== Travel ==
Gutter punks are generally homeless and transient. Many travel by alternative means of transportation such as illegally riding freight trains ("freighthopping") or hitchhiking. The number of gutter punks who travel to various U.S. cities is in the thousands, and they often congregate in major U.S. cities. Some may squat in abandoned buildings.

== Lifestyle ==
Gutter punks are sometimes voluntarily unemployed and may acquire income by panhandling, sometimes holding signs (known as "flying a sign") requesting spare change (known as "spange", with the act called "spanging"). Some gutter punks are drug dealers or refer "custies" ('customers') in exchange for "finder's fee". Some earn a meager but honest income as "buskers", playing acoustic instruments such as the guitar, banjo, mandolin and ukulele on the sidewalk for tips. Other gutter punks earn income as temporary or migrant workers.

== Cities of congregation ==
Cities where gutter punks may congregate include:

- Austin, Texas
- Berkeley, California
- The East Village, Manhattan, and Williamsburg, Brooklyn, in New York City.
- The Haight-Ashbury district in San Francisco
- New Orleans, Louisiana
- Portland, Oregon

== See also ==
- Anarcho-punk
- Bohemianism
- Crusties
- Crust punk
- Folk punk
- Feral (subculture)
- Hobo
- List of subcultures
- New Age travellers
- Punk ideologies
- Punk subculture
- Squatting
- Refusal of work
- The Decline of Western Civilization Part III – a documentary film about young homeless punks of Los Angeles in the late 1990s
