= The Road to Mars =

1999 novel by Eric Idle

- First edition (US)
- Author: Eric Idle
- Genre: comedy, science fiction
- Publisher: Boxtree (UK); Pantheon Books (US)
- Publication date: 10 September 1999
- Media type: Print
- ISBN: 0-7522-2414-X
- OCLC: 45370282

The Road to Mars is a 1999 science fiction comedic novel by Eric Idle.

== Plot summary ==
Told from the point of view of Professor Bill Reynolds, a scholar in the then-fictitious discipline of micropaleontology, this novel is set in the 24th and 25th centuries, when the Solar System has been colonised. Reynolds is writing a thesis on fame and in his research discovers a dissertation on comedy submitted by Carlton, a robotic secretary for two stand-up comedians on an interplanetary comedy circuit. Most of the action in the novel follows this trio's adventures during the time when Reynolds believes Carlton was developing his theories. During this time, Carlton and his owners, Alex Muscroft and Lewis Ashby get caught up in a series of disasters including loss of work, parental responsibility and close scrapes with terrorists, the law, other entertainers, and a refugee crisis.

Carlton seeks to understand the nature of comedy and human laughter, and attempts to describe humor as a mathematical formula.

== Characters ==
Professor Bill Reynolds: The story's narrator, who is writing a thesis on fame.

Carlton: A "Bowie" robotic secretary owned by a comedy duo. He is of a now-obsolete series based on David Bowie, with one green and one blue eye, with Carlton's particular model, the 4.5, being based on Bowie circa 1983. He is studying his owners as part of his research on comedy.

Alex Muscroft: The comedian who bought Carlton, and sees him like a person much more than most of the human cast, having a concern and affection for him not commonly shown towards robots. Short with short red hair, a ruddy complexion in appearance, loud and personable in temperament. Carlton describes him in his thesis as having the boisterous troublemaking slapstick qualities of his "Red Nose" comic archetype.

Lewis Ashby: Alex's comedy partner, he is tall, skinny, has thinning black hair and is gruff and introverted. Carlton describes him in his thesis as having the grave deadpan and somewhat cruel qualities of the "White Face" comic archetype.

Katy Wallace: A mysterious woman who befriends Alex.

Tay: Lewis's daughter

Keppler: Owner of the space liner the Princess Di

Brenda Wooley: An aging pop-star who is still popular in the outer Solar System, and Keppler's wife.

The Amazing Keith: A comedy-magician whose act utilizes explosives.

Boo: Another comedian, he appears to be somewhat mad, providing a contrast to the story's other somewhat more professionally minded comedians.

== Reception ==
The Road to Mars received positive reviews, being described as "a joy to read" by Devon Thomas in Library Journal.
