= Bodgies and widgies =

Youth sub culture Australia and NZ

Bodgies and widgies refer to a youth subculture that existed in Australia and New Zealand since the mid 1940s to the late 1950s, similar to the rocker culture in the UK or greaser culture in the United States. Most bodgies rode motorbikes but some had cars, many of which were embellished with accessories such as mag wheels and hot dog mufflers. Bodgies engaged in violence, but there was never any motive behind these acts. Males were called bodgies and females were called widgies.

Bodgies were often depicted in Australian media and folk-lore as louts. On 1 February 1951, the Sydney Morning Herald wrote on its front page:

What with "bodgies" growing their hair long and getting around in satin shirts, and "wedgies" cutting their hair short and wearing jeans, confusion seems to be arising about the sex of some Australian adolescents.

In New Zealand, the Mazengarb Report (Report of the Special Committee on Moral Delinquency in Children and Adolescents) of 1954 was partly a response to the emergence of the bodgie & widgie subculture.

Citing a Sydney Morning Herald article from 21 January 1956, Professor Keith Moore wrote in 2004:

The first bodgies were World War 2 Australian seamen who as well as impersonating Americans were black marketers and the first bodgie gang was the 'Woolloomooloo Yanks' who congregated in Cathedral Street Woolloomooloo. By 1948, about 200 bodgies were regularly frequenting Kings Cross milk bars. Soon, bodgie gangs formed at other inner-Sydney locations. After a time, moccasins and American drape suits complete with pegged trousers replaced their attire of blue jeans and leather American Airline jackets or zoot suits. For bodgies, almost all of whom were working class, emulating the high status Americans who had so recently occupied Australia as military personnel was easier than achieving upward social mobility.

There was a Victorian Police (Australia) Bodgies and Widgies Squad formed – plain clothed. Their job was to bust up the gang.

In 1983, the Melbourne Age interviewing Joh Hewett for his upcoming theses suggested:

the term "bodgie" arose around the Darlinghurst area in Sydney. It was just after the end of World War II and rationing had caused a flourishing black market in American-made cloth. [John Hewet says,] "People used to try and pass off inferior cloth as American-made when in fact it was not: so it was called 'bodgie'... When some of the young guys started talking with American accents to big-note themselves they were called bodgies."

== Australian rockers ==
Australian Rockers stemmed from the bodgies and widgies subculture that came into prominence in the mid 1950s. Bodgies took on that James Dean look in the period of post-World War II prosperity.

The 1970s were the rockers' heyday in Adelaide, whilst in Melbourne and Victorian towns like Mildura it was the 1960s until the mid 1970s. During the 1980s in South Australia, and possibly other Australian regions, Australian rockers were typically working class and fairly reactionary. Typical interests were alcohol, girls, music and cars. They were known as troublemakers and street fighters, and there were several rocker groups. It was not uncommon for rockers to fight members of other subcultures, such as surfies, mods, sharpies and skinheads. Those groups mostly liked hard rock and heavy metal music, by bands such as AC/DC, Lobby Loyde and the Coloured Balls, Rose Tattoo, The Angels, Midnight Oil, Iron Maiden, Led Zeppelin, and Deep Purple. Australian Rockers of the 1970s enjoyed the music of the 1950s, 1960s and 1970s, but identified heavily with the look, style and rock n roll style of music and movie greats such as Elvis Presley and James Dean.

Unlike their British counterparts, rockers in Australia had no association with rockabilly or Cafe Racer motorcycles. This Australian youth subculture had more in common with the 1950s and 1960s rock n roll scene.

Cars common to rockers included Chevrolets, Oldsmobiles, Fords, Pontiacs or other American 1950s and 1960s classics. Rockers who did not own those brands generally had modified Australian cars, such as early model Holdens, Fords or Valiants. Especially the Holden FJ car was a prized possession. A number of rockers owned motorbikes.

=== Style and clothing ===
Australian rockers commonly wore black mesh shirts; black or white T-shirts; singlets or flannelette shirts (usually in a blue or occasionally red check pattern). Common jackets included classic suit jackets, generally dark coloured (blue or black); herringbone jackets; leather motorcycle jackets (sometimes with a fur-lined collar); red Holden or blue Ford jackets (with the logos of local car manufacturers emblazoned across the back); or denim jackets or vests. Australian rockers usually wore tight jeans, often with the legs taken in and Black leather studded belts, worn hung loose around the lower waist with the belt buckle set to the side. Studded wristbands were also common. Some rockers sewed their jeans on (i.e. take in their jeans while wearing them, to make them as tight as possible) for the weekends.

Footwear common to Australian rockers included black ripple-soled suede shoes and black boots. Many rockers wore RM Williams leather elastic-sided square-toed boots but many more preferred the pointed shoes called winklepickers. Alternatives included ankle-high work boots (often steel capped), Adidas Officials (a black leather trainer/sneaker) and the Ciak casual shoe (usually black).

The common look was slicked back or coiffed into a quiff, using Brylcreem or another hair cream. Some styled their hair into what were known as racks, hair curled into two waves meeting at a point at the forehead, but always slicked back on the sides. The Elvis look was extremely predominant in Rocker culture. Headgear, if worn, was typically a black knitted beanie (US name: watch cap, Canadian name: tuque).

Tattoos, including bum tatts (amateur tattoos), were common among Australian rockers. Harder rockers often had small red stars with black/blue outlines tattooed on their faces (usually cheeks) and ears. These tattooed stars were known as rocker stars.

=== Schism and the splintering off from Melbourne Rocker gangs ===
During 1963, a rocker gang, called the Collingwood Boys, which originated from Melbourne’s inner eastern suburbs of Collingwood and Fitzroy, became tired of the early 1960s rocker look and chose to differentiate in style from other rocker gangs. Their haircuts changed to a slightly longer form of short hair, called a crew cut, while their clothes changed to brown and blue three buttoned suits, tight fitting plain cardigans and chiseled toed custom shoes that was inconsistent with the rocker’s pointy winklepickers. Later on in 1963, another stylistic change occurred when the gang decided to wear cable-stitched jumpers and cardigans. Other gangs from surrounding suburbs began to adopt this new style. One of these other gangs, called the ’64 Rockers, also tired of the rocker look joined with the Collingwood Boys and by late 1965, the new Sharpies sub-cultural movement in Melbourne began. Both Melbourne Sharpie gangs and rocker gangs had an intense rivalry and mutual dislike for each other which lasted well into the 1970s. By the mid 1970s, the Sharpies had become the dominant form of gang In Melbourne.

== In media ==
Actor and comedian Grahame Bond created a character named Kev Kavanagh for the 1972 sketch comedy series The Aunty Jack Show and the spinoff series Wollongong the Brave. A more exaggerated version of the character was revived as the "last living bodgie" in the 1985 comedy series News Free Zone.

Former Prime Minister of Australia Bob Hawke was nicknamed the Silver Bodgie by the Australian media for his thick silver-grey hair worn in the bodgie style and loutish behaviour before entering politics.

Bodgie is a 1959 ABC television play.

== See also ==
- Beatniks
- Bogan
- Sharpies
- Skinhead
- Teddy Boys
