= Things Bogans Like =

Australian blog and Facebook group

Things Bogans Like is an Australian blog created in 2009 in response and reaction to the 2008 North American blog and publishing phenomenon Stuff White People Like. Six residents of Melbourne (Australia) self-styled as Michael Jayfox, E. Chas McSween, Intravenus DeMilo, Enron Hubbard, Hunter McKenzie-Smythe and Flash Johnson collectively wrote the blog.

Things Bogans Like, along with television shows Kath & Kim and Upper Middle Bogan is a satirical examination of Australian suburban culture early in the 21st century, as it underwent changes caused by economic and cultural globalisation.

Things Bogans Like was referred to in daily Melbourne newspaper The Age and mocked in The Punch. The blog's style blended factual research and satire. Things Bogans Like subsequently became a popular Facebook group.

Topics covered on the site including Tramp Stamps, Boost Juice, Sexpo, The Melbourne Cup, Malapropisms, and Kings of Leon. The authors cite Brendan Fevola, Bec Cartwright, and other Australian celebrities as examples of the new Australian bogan.

The national bestselling book Things Bogans Like was released in 2010 by Hachette Australia, with its successor, Boganomics, released in 2011.
