= The Monty Python Matching Tie and Handkerchief =

Studio album by Monty Python
- Released: 7 December 1973 (UK); 21 April 1975 (US)
- Recorded: September 1973
- Studio: Radio Luxembourg Studios, Maximum Sound Studios & Sunflower Music (Garden Shed), London
- Genre: Comedy
- Length: 41:11
- Label: Charisma (UK); Arista (US)
- Producer: Andre Jacquemin; Dave Howman; Terry Gilliam

Monty Python chronology
Monty Python's Previous Record (1972)	The Monty Python Matching Tie and Handkerchief (1973)	Monty Python Live at Drury Lane (1974)

Professional ratings
Review scores
Source	Rating
Allmusic	3/5 stars

The Monty Python Matching Tie and Handkerchief is the fourth album by the comedy group Monty Python, released in 1973. Most of the material was newly written for the album along with a handful of sketches from the third series of Flying Circus, one from the second ("Bruces") and another from the first ("Pet Conversions"). The team were once again joined by Neil Innes, who provided a trio of rock music parodies for "The Background to History". The album was famously mixed and edited in a garden shed belonging to the father of producer Andre Jacquemin.

== Background ==
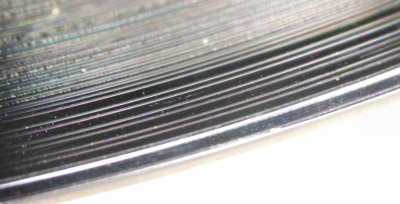
View of a double-grooved record similar to The Monty Python Matching Tie and Handkerchief

The initial pressings were designed to resemble a box containing a tie and handkerchief, the concept being that the record was merely a 'free gift' included with the package. It was also notable for its inner artwork, which was visible through a cutaway hole in the album's outer sleeve. It appeared to be a simple Terry Gilliam artwork of a tie and handkerchief, but when the card insert was pulled out it revealed that the tie and handkerchief were actually on a man hanging from a gallows. A second insert featured the album credits and the text to "The Background to History" sketch. The US release had a different cover design with the two insert sheets printed on either side of a card inner sleeve. Later releases of the album would have just a picture of the clothing on the front cover, without the inserts.

The album's original LP edition is particularly notable in that it was mastered with two concentric grooves on side two, so that different material would be played depending on where the stylus was put down on the record's surface. For this reason it is sometimes referred to as a "three-sided" record. The album did not have a track listing, so that this feature would come as a complete surprise to listeners, who might on a subsequent listening hear material they had never heard before, creating genuine confusion. To further confuse the listener, both sides of the record label were labelled "FREE RECORD Given away with the Monty Python Matching Tie and Handkerchief – Side 2" – only the matrix numbers identify which are the first and second sides. The cutting was carried out by George "Porky" Peckham, who became known for etching messages into runout grooves. This was the first of many Python albums to bear one of these so-called "Porky Prime Cuts" – a brief message on Side 2 which reads: "PORKY – RAY ADVENTURE".

Since the record had two concentric grooves, they were spaced considerably apart, halving the length of the playing time. Subsequent editions of the vinyl incorporated both grooves sequentially as separate tracks, eliminating the double groove. Likewise with promotional copies for radio stations, as they were banded for airplay. However, when Virgin reissued the album in the UK in 1985, the double groove was retained, but with the "Great Actors" sketch cut from the end of Side 1 and moved onto the start of the second side which previously began with "The Background to History". This meant the two B-sides no longer had equal length, resulting in a long silence following the "Phone-In" sketch at the end of the second Side B.

== Release ==
The album reached No. 49 on the UK album chart.

No single was released from the album in the UK but the belated US release (the group's first on Arista) in 1975 was promoted by a 7" single entitled "The Single" (AS 0130) which consisted of three excerpts from the album tracks "Elephantoplasty", "Mrs Niggerbaiter" and "Pet Conversions". Both sides of the record were labelled Side B, with the other side containing "The Cheese Shop" in its entirety.

The 2006 reissue featured new sound effects on some sketches as well as four previously unreleased bonus tracks, although these date from the 1980 Contractual Obligation Album sessions.

The 2014 LP reissue by Virgin Record Ltd. contains the original version of the album without bonus tracks. It also restores the two concentric grooves on Side 2. The new lacquer has been cut by Abbey Road Studios engineer Sean Magee.

== Legacy ==
Post-punk band Department S took the name of their 1981 hit single "Is Vic There?" from a line of dialogue from the album's closing "Phone-In" sketch.

== Track listing ==
The following sketches are from the TV series: "Dead Bishop", "Bruces", "Cheese Shop", "Boxing Tonight", "Mrs. Niggerbaiter", "Oscar Wilde", and "Pet Conversions". The remainder are exclusive to this album.

=== Side One: Single-Groove ===
1. Election Forum
2. Dead Bishop
3. Elephantoplasty
4. Novel Writing
5. Word Association
6. Bruces
7. Bruces Song
8. Ralph Mellish
9. Doctor Quote
10. Cheese Shop
11. Wasp/Tiger Club
12. Great Actors

=== Side Two: Groove One ===
1. The Background to History
2. Record Shop
3. First World War Noises
4. Boxing Tonight

=== Side Two: Groove Two ===
1. Mrs. Niggerbaiter
2. Oscar Wilde
3. Pet Conversions
4. Phone-In

=== 2006 bonus tracks ===
1. Psychopath
2. TelePrompter Football Results
3. Radio Tuning Radio 4: Announcer Graham Chapman / Radio Time Announcer Terry Jones
4. Radio Shop

== Charts ==
Chart (1974/75)	Peak position
Australia (Kent Music Report)	82
United Kingdom (Official Charts Company)	49

== Personnel ==
- Graham Chapman
- John Cleese
- Terry Gilliam
- Eric Idle
- Terry Jones
- Michael Palin

=== Additional performers ===
- Carol Cleveland
- Neil Innes (music and vocals on "The Background to History")

== Music credits ==
The following is the list of musical works included on the album. They comprise a mixture of Keith Prowse and De Wolfe library music, self-penned Python songs and specially composed music by Neil Innes, Andre Jacquemin and Dave Howman.

1. All Things Bright and Beautiful (C F Alexander/W H Monk arr. Python)
2. Saturday's Game (L. Stevens)
3. Bruces Song (Eric Idle)
4. Voodoo Victim (G. Vinter)
5. Terror by Night (H. Clifford)
6. Crowning Glory (K. Papworth)
7. Place Omadia (M. Plessas)
8. Days Work (M. McNought)
9. Sir Thomas Mortimer's Almand (G. Walters)
10. Oxon Song 1-3 (Neil Innes)
11. Funk Roll (Andre Jacquemin & Dave Howman)
12. Harmonica Solo "Trench Music" (Eric Idle)

== Awards ==
=== Grammy Awards ===
Year	Award	Result
1976	Best Comedy Album	Nominated
