= Feral (subculture) =

Counter-cultural social movement

The feral subculture is a counter-cultural social movement originating in the latter part of the 20th century, mainly centred in Australia. The movement reached its heyday in the mid 1990s, in parallel with other similar movements in Europe, North America, and elsewhere, such as gutter punks, crusties, and "travellers". In common with those movements, the feral phenomenon can be seen as part of the wider counterculture. In Australia, the ferals are often seen as an amalgam of the punk and hippie subcultures, with a radical environmental philosophy and many similarities to the gutter punk subculture. The movement, during the 1990s, was the subject of national attention, and as a phenomenon has been the subject of anthropological attention as a characteristically Australian "alternative lifestyle".

Going Tribal, a documentary by Light Source Films, examined the subculture in 1995.

The feral movement is strongly associated with radical environmentalism and a communal lifestyle, with many members residing on multiple occupancy properties. In common with the hippies before them, many members of the feral movement rely on a system of crash pads, squats, and extended networks of "friends of friends" throughout Australia to travel with a minimum of financial outlay. Although the itinerant lifestyle and environmental beliefs most associated with the feral movement are akin to those of the earlier hippie movement, the ferals adopted a confrontational, politically charged style of dress, music, and philosophy more often associated with the punk movement.

== See also ==
- Gutter punk
- Crust punk
- Hardcore punk
- Hardline (subculture)
- Straight edge
