= Westie (person) =

Slang - residents Greater Western Sydney, Melbourne and Auckland

Westie, or Westy, is slang in Australian and New Zealand English for residents of the western suburbs of Sydney, the western suburbs of Melbourne, or the western suburbs of Auckland.

The term originated, and is most often used, in relation to residents of the numerous western suburbs of Sydney, Australia, and of Auckland, New Zealand. According to the Macquarie Dictionary, the term in Australian English now refers to people from outer suburbs and a lower socio-economic background, or to the stereotypes associated with such people. It also states that the term has spread throughout Australia and may refer to people who may not live in the western part of their city. With reference to its use in Sydney, the Macquarie Book of Slang says the term is applied negatively to anyone that may live west of one's own suburb.

== Stereotype ==
"Westie" is often stereotyped as people from the outer suburbs who are unintelligent, undereducated, unmotivated, unrefined, lacking in fashion sense, working-class or unemployed. Clothing such as flannelette shirts, Ugg boots, leopard-print fabric, Adidas outfits with stripes, and blue singlets are associated with the stereotype, as are the "uniform" of black T-shirt and ripped jeans.

=== Auckland, New Zealand ===
In Auckland, westies are almost entirely residents of West Auckland and in particular the suburbs of Massey, Te Atatū, Henderson, Sunnyvale, Glen Eden, Green Bay, Titirangi, Ranui, and New Lynn. Until 2010, these western suburbs formed much of Waitakere City. Some people from Avondale are called by others and themselves westies although Avondale was within the territory of the former Auckland City.

To be called a Westie in Auckland is sometimes ambiguous as it can be both a pejorative or good natured, depending on intent. Many people from west Auckland will call themselves Westies with pride yet not meet the stereotypical criteria. Westies are stereotypically seen as being more brash and of-the-soil than other districts of Auckland. The stereotype also incorporates black jerseys and old V8 cars.

The shift from a pejorative to a societal identifier has been abrupt and in no small part due to the 1993 single Westy Gals by Auckland singer Jan Hellriegel and local comedian Ewen Gilmour's stand-up comedy act as Ewen "Westie" Gilmour between 1995 and 2000 in the premier television programme Pulp Comedy. Both of these instances gave the term national prominence. Gilmour was "unofficially appointed cultural ambassador" for Waitakere City. He was elected as councillor for the Waitakere City Council in 2004 and joins former mayor Tim Shadbolt as stereotypical westies who entered local body politics. The biography of Bob Harvey, former mayor of Waitakere City, was titled Wild Westie.

The successful television series Outrageous Fortune is set in west Auckland with the main characters being the West family, a play on the word "Westie".

The persona of the standard Auckland "Westie" continues to evolve. In November 2008 Paula Bennett defeated Lynne Pillay, the long-standing Labour Member of Parliament for Waitakere under the banner "Proud to be a Westy". Bennett is a solo mother and a former social service beneficiary who became Deputy Prime Minister of New Zealand in the former National-led Government. Simon Bridges (an ex-Westie) served as leader of the Opposition from 2018 to 2020, during this time National was led by two "Westies".

As of the 2010 amalgamation of Auckland's council boundaries into one regional greater council, Waitakere City no longer exists as a distinct entity. Yet, those living within the former boundaries remain claiming themselves as Westies essentially within the former boundaries.

=== Sydney, Australia ===
The term "Westie" was a creation of the 1960s and 1970s as young, working families were encouraged westward into the newly built, rather austere public and private housing subdivisions on Sydney's urban fringe. It was a term of division and derision, and became shorthand for a population considered lowbrow, coarse and lacking education and cultural refinement. Immortalised in the 1977 social realist film, The FJ Holden, by Michael Thornhill, the classic Westie was a male of Anglo-Celtic origin who lived in the vast, homogenous flatlands west of the Sydney CBD. The checked flannelette shirt symbolised his attire and vandalism, cheap drink and hotted-up cars his behaviour. Westie became a rhetorical device to designate the other Sydney: spatially, culturally and economically different from the more prosperous and privileged Sydneysiders of the North, East and South

Some in the eastern suburbs might consider residents of Epping as Westies, others may restrict the term to areas such as Blacktown, Granville, Burwood and Berala. Westies were also a common sight in the 1980s in the south-western suburbs such as Minto and Campbelltown. The term may also be used to describe someone who acts or uses the same mannerisms as a person from the western suburbs but lives somewhere else.

==== Coastal suburbs ====
It could be noted in this context that in Sydney, the western suburbs often have no (or less prominent) coastal access. This is often reflected in house prices and suburb "status". The typical commute of a resident living in the western suburbs of these cities also involves driving towards the sun each way, possibly explaining the cultural similarities across multiple cities. The commuters are commonly known as squinters due to the fact that they must squint while driving because of the rising and setting sun.

=== Ballarat, Australia ===
A Westie in Ballarat is a person living in the western portions of Wendouree, a suburb in the north-west of Ballarat also known for its lower socio-economic status.

== See also ==
- Bogan
- Chav
- Elitism
- Classism

== Bibliography ==
- Powell, Diane (1993). Out west: perceptions of Sydney's western suburbs. St. Leonards, NSW: Allen & Unwin. ISBN 1-86373-503-8.
- Collins, Jock; Poynting, Scott, eds. (2000). The other Sydney: communities, identities and inequalities in Western Sydney. Altona, Vic.: Common Ground Publishing. ISBN 1-86335-017-9.
- Harvey, Bob (2004). Westies up front out there. Auckland: Exisle. ISBN 978-0-908988-38-9.
