= Sharpies (Australian subculture) =

Members of Australian youth gangs (1960s–1970s)

Sharpies, or sharps, were members of suburban youth gangs in Australia, most significantly from the 1960s and 1970s. They were particularly prominent in Melbourne, but were also found in Sydney and Perth to lesser extents. Sharpies were known for being violent, although a strict moral code was also evident, and many ex-sharpies argue that claims of wrongdoing were exaggerated. The name comes from their focus on looking and dressing "sharp".

== Sharpie culture ==
Sharpies would often congregate in large numbers, regularly attending live bands at town hall and high school dances.

Common clothing items included Lee or Levi jeans, cardigans, jumpers, and T-shirts—often individually designed by group members.

Mods were an enemy of sharpies, and their gang brawls were reported in the newspapers during 1966. In a 2002 interview, a former sharpie stated that despite the sharpie culture being quite violent – especially as they crossed other gangs' territories on the public transport network – the altercations were restricted to inter-gang rivalries.

Sharpies were particularly fond of Australian pub rock and hard rock groups such as Rose Tattoo, Lobby Lloyde and the Coloured Balls and Billy Thorpe and the Aztecs.

=== Origins of the Melbourne Sharpies ===
The original Melbourne’s sharpies arose in late 1965 when two rocker gangs, the Collingwood Boys and the Rockers ’64, amalgamated. In 1963, the Collingwood Boys were tiring of the "rocker" style, and that eventually led them to reject their previous affiliations of the earlier 1960s Australian Rocker scene. Other gangs in the surrounding suburbs also took on this new trend, and thus the movement begun flourishing around many other suburbs of Melbourne. According to Paul "Nazz" Oldham, who wrote a thorough discussion about the origins of the sharpies, the sharpies went through four different generational phases: 1964–1970 (the formative and growth period), 1970–1972 (the move away from conservative dress codes and opposition towards the hippie movement), 1972–1976 (the peak era), and 1976–1980s (the hairstyles became longer and exaggerated tight-fitting apparel), "before finally dying away by 1984". Conjecture about who was first between Melbourne Sharps and Sydney Sharps has led to serious debate and some animosity between members of the rival city groups.

== Sharpies in popular culture ==
- Photographer Rennie Ellis has included portraits of sharpies in his works
- Queeny (1994), Deep (1997), and Suburban Warriors (2003) are short films by Rebecca McLean related to sharpies
- Blackburn South Sharpies' member Peter Robertson curated Sharpies, a photographic exhibition at the Museum of Contemporary Art in Sydney in 2001–02, and also as part of the 2002 Melbourne International Fashion Festival
- Blackburn South Sharpies' member Larry Jenkins also photographically documented this gang
- The Australian Broadcasting Corporation featured sharpies in a 2002 episode of George Negus's New Dimensions in Time
- Comedian Magda Szubanski was a sharpie in her youth and parodied the subculture on Fast Forward.
- Levi released "Levi's Black Sharps", a denim range inspired by sharpies
- Top Fellas: The Story of Melbourne's Sharpie Cult is a 2004 book by Tadhg Taylor on Melbourne's sharpies
- Rage: A Sharpie's Journal Melbourne 1974–1980 is a 2010 book by Julie Mac on Melbourne's sharpies
- Out with the Boys: The Sharpie Days is a 2011 book by the Seagull about the Sydney Sharpies of the 1960s
- Once Were Sharps: The Colourful Life and Times of the Thomastown Sharps is a book by Nick Tolewski, written by Dean Crozier
- A resurgence of interest in the Sharpie sub-culture in recent times included Skins'n'Sharps Exhibitions in 2006 (Dante's Gallery, Fitzroy) and 2010 (Kustom Lane Gallery, Hawthorn) and a dedicated website Skins'n'Sharps
