= Hello Sailor (novel) =

1975 novel by Eric Idle

- Author: Eric Idle
- Language: English
- Genre: Satire
- Publisher: Weidenfeld & Nicolson (hardcover); Futura Publications (paperback)
- Publication date: 1975
- Publication place: United Kingdom
- Media type: Print (hardback & paperback)
- Pages: 169
- ISBN: 0-297-76929-4
- OCLC: 1551782
- Dewey Decimal: 823/.9/14
- LC Class: PZ4.I17 He PR6059.D4

Hello Sailor is a novel written by Eric Idle and consists of several interweaving stories. The novel's structure is jagged, and its characters odd and unusual. The conclusion of the book is unusual in that the majority of text on the last page is blacked out, allowing the reader to choose the ending he or she would most prefer.

== Story ==
Hello Sailor is a satirical view of British politics. Key plot points in the novel include a secret of the British Prime minister, and a "space first" by an astronaut named Sickert. Also, during the course of the novel, every Minister's daughter is seduced. Characters included in the plot include a stuffed corpse which serves the post of Foreign Secretary.

== Background ==
Eric Idle wrote Hello Sailor, his first novel, in 1970. The book was first printed in 1975 hardcover by the London publishers of fiction, Weidenfeld & Nicolson. An article on h2g2 attributes the delay to Idle's distrust of the publishing industry. As a literary work from a highly notable performer, the novel was reviewed in The Times Literary Supplement on 21 March 1975. The original hardcover book did not sell very well, but the book was reprinted the same year by Futura Publications. This paperpack issue of the novel was a moderate success.

Though the book sold well, it remains one of Idle's lesser-known works, and is notable as the first published novel by a member of the Monty Python team. (The second would be Michael Palin's Hemingway's Chair, published in 1995.) Idle poked fun at the obscurity of his first novel in a review of Irish novelist, Roddy Doyle's A Star Called Henry (1999), writing of Doyle, "anyone who has read Hello Sailor (my first scurrilous novel published 22 years ago) deserves a plug." In an interview with The Globe and Mail in 2002, Idle again made reference to the rarity of the book, quipping, "Worth quite a bit on the Internet, I hear."

In his diary entry for 22 February 1975, Michael Palin linked the novel with the dissolution of the Monty Python team. On the day of the diary entry, Idle visited Palin at his home, bringing him an autographed copy of the book. At his home, Idle informed Palin of his decision to leave the team. Palin noted that the novel as well as other solo work by Idle indicated that he was uncomfortable with the restraints the team and the series placed on his career. Idle, according to Palin, was "understandably anxious to shed his old Python Skin... he's moving on, like John did."

A book of the same title was mentioned by Idle and Cleese in the Monty Python's Flying Circus episode "Sex and Violence" during "The Wrestling Epilogue" sketch, in which a humanist philosophy professor, author of a novel entitled Hello Sailor, debates an Anglican monsignor over the existence of God in an officiated wrestling match.

== Reviews ==
- "Hello Sailor (review)". The Times Literary Supplement. London: 293. 21 March 1975.
