= Ocker =

Australian slang term

The term "ocker" is used both as a noun and adjective for an Australian who speaks in Strine, a broad Australian accent, and acts in a rough and uncultivated manner. Richard Neville defined the ocker positively as being "about conviviality: comradeship with a touch of good-hearted sexism". However, the term is mostly understood to be pejorative compared to other terms, including larrikin, mate, cobber and bloke. In the 1980s, Carol Thatcher (daughter of British Prime Minister Margaret Thatcher) was said to have been met with a hostile reception when she attempted to write a book comparing "ockers" with "poms". John Richard wrote that the "awful ocker" juxtaposed with the "loveable larrikin".

"The ocker" was in popular use in the 1970s and 1980s, although was seen by cultural commentators to have dissipated by the 1990s. However, a number of commentators observed the emergence of an ocker chic in which middle-class people, predominantly males, took on the style, accent, mannerisms and backstory of working-class people or other mythical "national types", including the ANZAC soldier and the stockman, but without the vulgarity of the ocker. The idea was first raised by Donald Horne and Max Harris in the mid-1970s but was not conceptualised until Diane Kirkby's work in the 2000s. The larrikin is the positive term used by people engaged in ocker chic to describe themselves or others and is seen in favourable contrast to the Bogan, which is thought of as being neither sophisticated nor reflective of Australian values.

== Etymology ==
"Ocker" was recorded from 1916 as a nickname for anyone called Oscar. The 1920s Australian comic strip Ginger Meggs contained a character called Oscar ("Ocker") Stevens. The term "ocker" in its modern usage arose from a character of that name, played by Ron Frazer, who appeared in the satirical television comedy series The Mavis Bramston Show from 1965 to 1968. The term "ocker chic" arose in its modern meaning in 1986 in an article written for Australian Playboy.

== History ==
=== The Ocker ===
Michelle Arrow sees the ocker as a reactionary movement of men in the first half of the 1970s using parody to rebel against the women's liberation movement. Many films made during the Australian film renaissance of the 1970s were marketed as "ocker comedies", representing a "masculine, populist, and cheerfully vulgar view of Australian society". These films were latterly described as "Ozploitation". While popular with audiences, most ocker films were loathed by critics. Among the best known are Stork (1971), The Adventures of Barry McKenzie (1972), and Alvin Purple (1973).

=== Ocker chic ===
According to Kirkby, the ocker became "less parodic as the nation became a 'projection of the larrikin fantasies of middle-class Australian men'." C. J. Coventry sees ocker chic as "cultural propaganda". Ocker chic "helped to secure emergent sources of wealth, especially from a heavily unionised working class, and it permitted the open enjoyment of wealth in a time when wage growth was suppressed and unemployment was increasing." It is the Australian machismo equivalent to the one Gore Vidal argued in Gore Vidal: The United States of Amnesia was ascendant in the United States in the 1980s under President Ronald Reagan. Others see the American machismo as beginning earlier with Richard Nixon running through every president to Donald Trump. The machismo strategy to align white men behind right wing populism in the United States began with the Republican political operative Arthur J. Finkelstein in the early 1970s.

Ocker depictions in cinema rapidly faded in the mid-1975s with softer characters emerging, played by actors such as Jack Thompson, Paul Hogan and John Hargreaves. From 1977, politicians began ocker-ising their image with Prime Minister Malcolm Fraser being seen in public drinking beer. The rise of Bob Hawke is seen as a key example of how widespread ocker chic had become by the 1980s. Hawke had cultivated an image as a typical union man that was very popular with middle-class voters as early as 1972 that carried him all the way to the prime minister's office. The central part of this image was his "world record" beer skol (scull) which was "at best apocryphal, at worst fabricated" with no evidential basis beyond its appearance in a beer pamphlet called the Guinness Book of Records. Prime Minister Paul Keating, who had come from a family that owned a large business and chose to live in an affluent part in an Australian Labor Party area, exhibited ocker chic by projecting a working class persona (drinking cans of beer in public and using tough talk) while also listening to classical music and collecting antique clocks.

Coventry cites numerous examples of ocker chic outside professional politics among businessmen, journalists, sportsmen, singer-songwriters and professionals. R. M. Williams manipulated his backstory to make himself seem to be a rough outdoorsman, even though his fortune was made in gold mining. The National Farmers Federation repurposed the working-class/union concept of the "fair go". The historian Manning Clark cultivated his image to appear more like a farmer.

== Present day ocker chic ==
Every prime minister since Fraser has utilised ocker chic. Politicians, including former Prime Minister of Australia Kevin Rudd, will often take on "ocker" cultural elements such as slang to appeal to various audiences. Coventry sees ocker chic as endemic, given the popularity of R. M. Williams boots and the popularity of "rugged" styles among middle-class men.

== Ocker chic cinema ==
- Crocodile Dundee
- Deathcheaters
- Caddie
- The Man from Hong Kong
- Don's Party
- The Man from Snowy River (1982 film)
- Gallipoli (1981 film)
- Australia (2008 film)
- The King's Speech
- Hawke (film)

== See also ==
- Bogan
- Bruces sketch
- Chav
- Cork hat
- Larrikin
- Westie
- Yobbo
