= Carré de l'Est =

French cheese

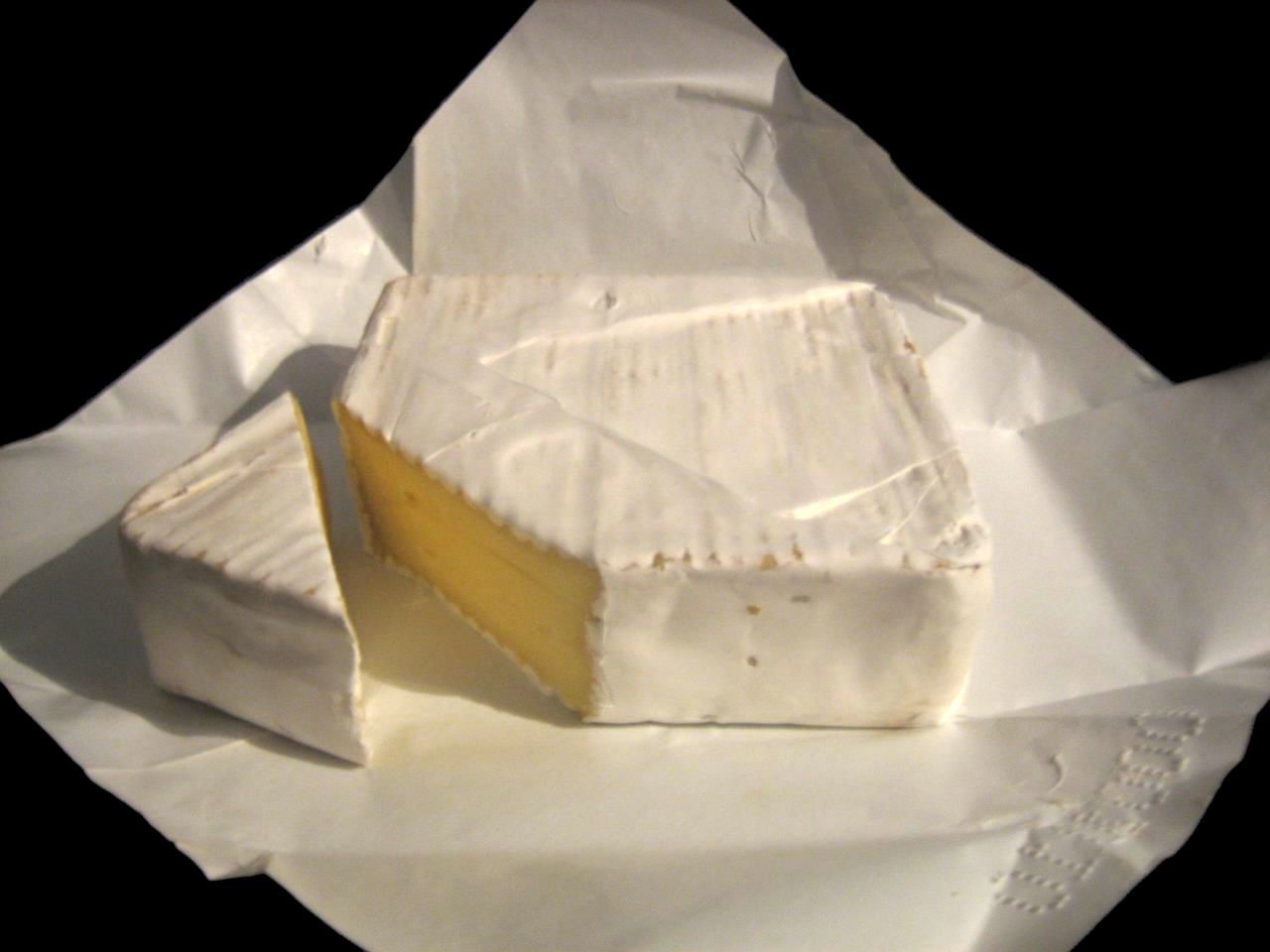
Carré de l'Est

Carré de l'Est (French pronunciation: [kɑʁe də lɛst]) is a French cheese originating from Lorraine. Its place of origin and square shape give it its name (literally "square of the East").

Carré de l'Est is produced from cow's milk and is aged for five weeks. It has a smoky bacon flavour.
