= Cork hat =

Hat with corks strung from the brim

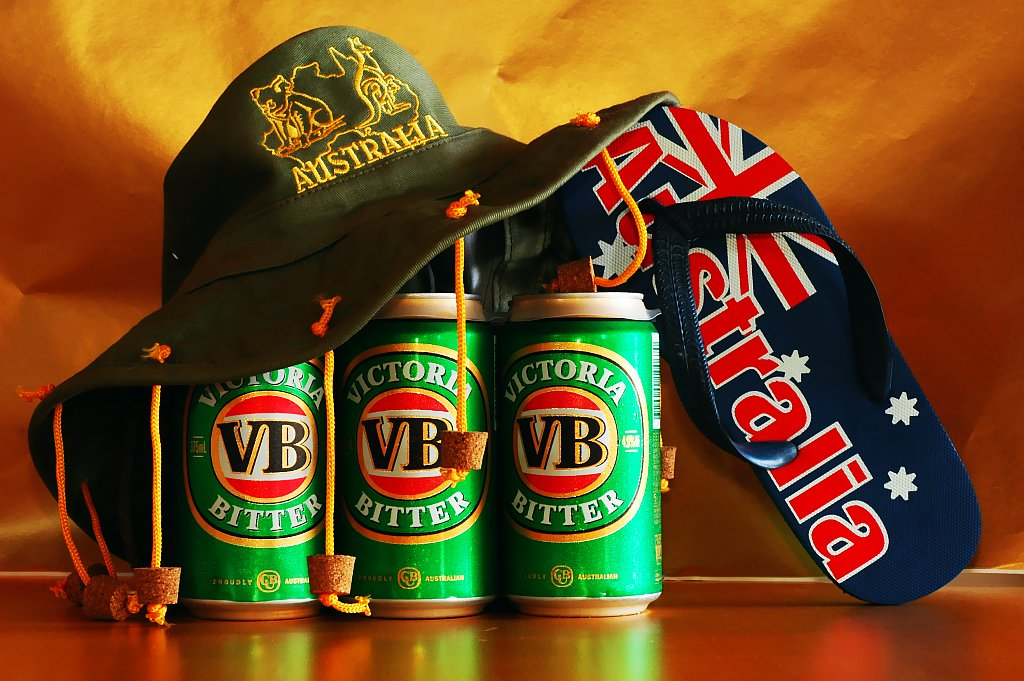
A cork hat, Australian beer and a thong

A cork hat is a type of headgear with corks strung from the brim, to ward off insects.

Pieces of cork, typically bottle corks, are hung on strings from the brim of the hat. The low density of cork means a number of pieces may hang from a hat without significantly increasing its weight. Movement of the head causes the corks to swing, discouraging insects, particularly bush flies, from swarming around the wearer's head, or entering the nose or mouth. The shape and material of cork hats varies but, typically, they are similar to a slouch hat.

Believed by some to have been worn by jackaroos and swagmen in the bush-fly-infested Australian outback, the cork hat has become part of the stereotypical, almost mythical, representation of the Australian ocker, particularly in the United Kingdom. Cork hats are a common purchase as a souvenir for tourists in Australia.

== See also ==
- Culture of Australia
- List of hat styles
