= Mr Praline =

Monty Python character

Mr Praline is a fictional character from the television show Monty Python's Flying Circus, played by comedian John Cleese.

== Appearances ==
The Monty Python team consciously decided to avoid recurring characters. Along with the Nude Organist (Terry Jones and Terry Gilliam), Michael Palin's "It's" man, the Gumbys, and Graham Chapman's Colonel, Mr Praline was one of the few deemed popular and useful enough for multiple appearances. Praline's initial appearance was in a first series episode during a vox pop segment, to announce that he would be appearing later in the show. This he did as a Police Inspector, following up on the case of Whizzo's Chocolates (hence his name, praline being a kind of hazelnut confection), which produced such gems as Cockroach Cluster, Anthrax Ripple, and the titular Crunchy Frog.

Praline's defining moment came in two episodes later, when he attempted to return his recently purchased dead parrot to the pet shop from which he had bought it, not half an hour ago at that very boutique. This segment has been called the comedy team's single best-known sketch, and it led to Praline's appearance in the team's first theatrical release, And Now for Something Completely Different (1971) which included a remake of the sketch.

In a second series episode Praline had more pet trouble, this time trying to buy a fish licence for his pet halibut, Eric. In this sketch, he mentions that he also has a cat and a dog named Eric among others and has acquired a (fraudulent) licence for the cat. This final sketch led to Praline singing the song "Eric the Half-a-Bee" on the Monty Python's Previous Record album.

Cleese eventually got so fed up with "doing the one with the parrot", that he vowed never again to perform the sketch; conversely, the Eric the Half-a-Bee segment is one of Cleese's personal favourites.

In episode 18, "Live from the Grill-o-mat", Praline appears with his flatmate Brooky (Eric Idle) as the host of a new chat show. However, the show in the sketch is cancelled and they later appear in "The Seven Brides For Seven Brothers Sketch".

A Variety photo shoot during the filming of Monty Python's Life of Brian in Tunisia resulted in the character's post-TV-series appearance. The comedy team was photographed in costume against mosques and palm trees; Michael Palin noted in his diary: "Nostalgia time. John was dressed in his Pacamac as Praline, complete with dead parrot."

== Character ==
Robert Ross' Monty Python Encyclopedia notes that Mr Praline has become a beloved figure within the Python canon. He has been discussed in Python-related literature as well as works not specifically dealing with the comedy team. Praline has an incredulous tone and exaggerated, somewhat high-pitched English accent with Scottish elements. Ross describes Praline's character as "slightly creepy", with a "British air of oppressed madness". Literature Through Film: Realism, Magic, and the Art of Adaptation (2004) holds Praline up as an example of a "Sancho-like realist". The 2006 book The Best British Stand-Up and Comedy Routines describes the disgruntled Mr Praline as "all plastered down hair and plastic raincoat".

Edward Slowik writes that in the "Fish Licence" sketch, Praline provides an example of Jean-Paul Sartre's existentialist concept of "bad faith". In this concept, a denial of individual freedom can result when a person fails to accept that past choices and behaviour determine one's character. By declaring "I am not a loony!" when his actions have shown he is clearly insane, Praline exhibits Sartrean "bad faith".

== Bibliography ==
- Johnson, Kim "Howard" (1999). The First 28~~0~~ Years of Monty Python. New York: Thomas Dunne Books. ISBN 0-312-16933-7.
