= Writing lines =

School punishment

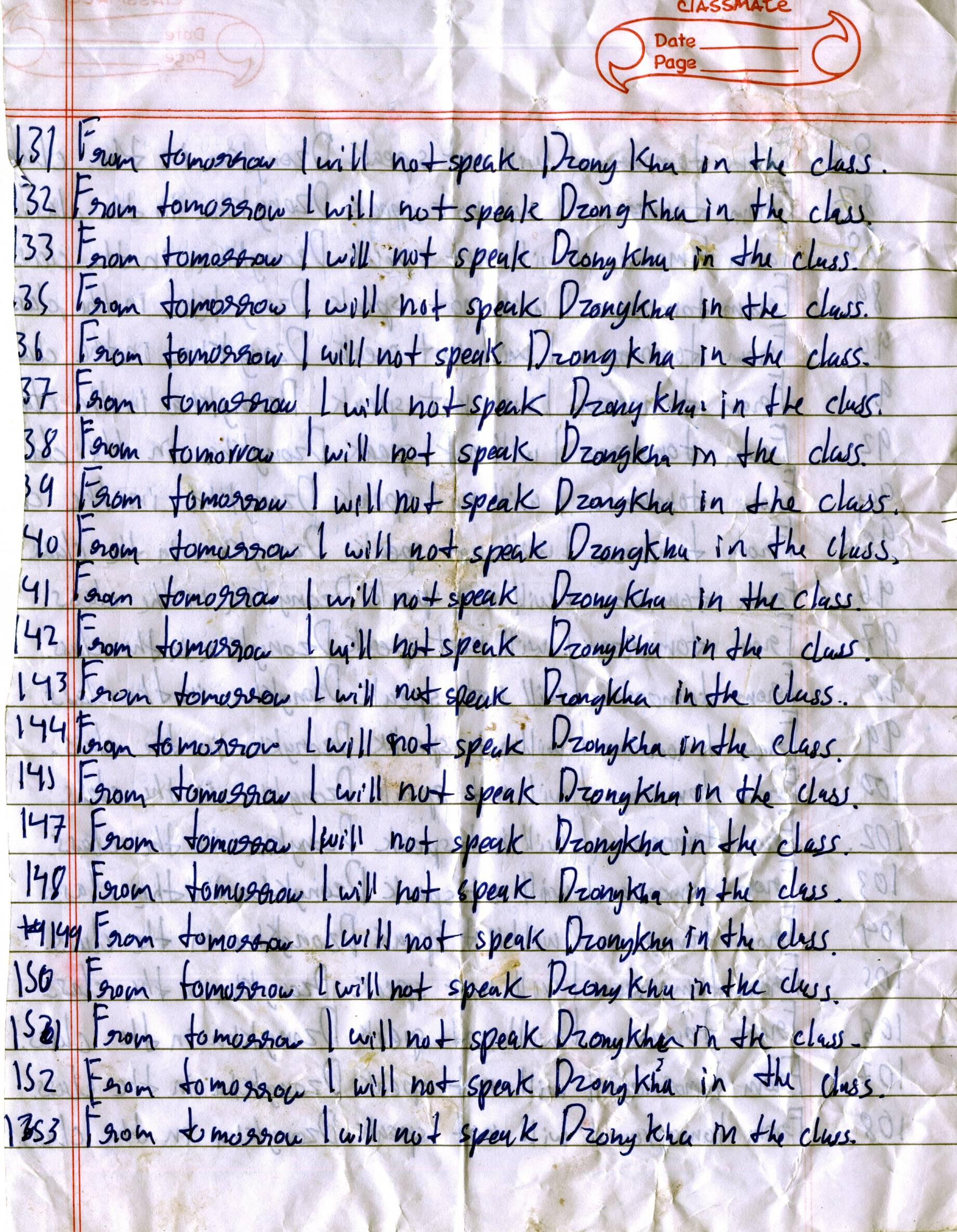
An example of a sentence assigned as punishment: "From tomorrow I will not speak Dzongkha in the class"

Writing lines is a form of punishment imposed by teachers on misbehaving students in schools. It is a long-standing form of school discipline and is frequently satirised in popular culture.

== Description ==
Writing lines involves copying a sentence onto a piece of paper or a chalkboard as many times as the punishment-giver deems necessary. The actual sentence to be copied varies but usually bears some relation to the reason for the punishment being imposed in the first place, e.g., "I must not misbehave in class".

It has been suggested that the use of writing as punishment conflicts with the pedagogical goal of encouraging students to enjoy writing. Writing is often used as a way to leverage shame and humiliation for punishment. However, particularly with young children, it may reduce disruptive behaviour at least while they are in the process of writing, simply because of the focus required for them to make the body movements for writing.

== History ==
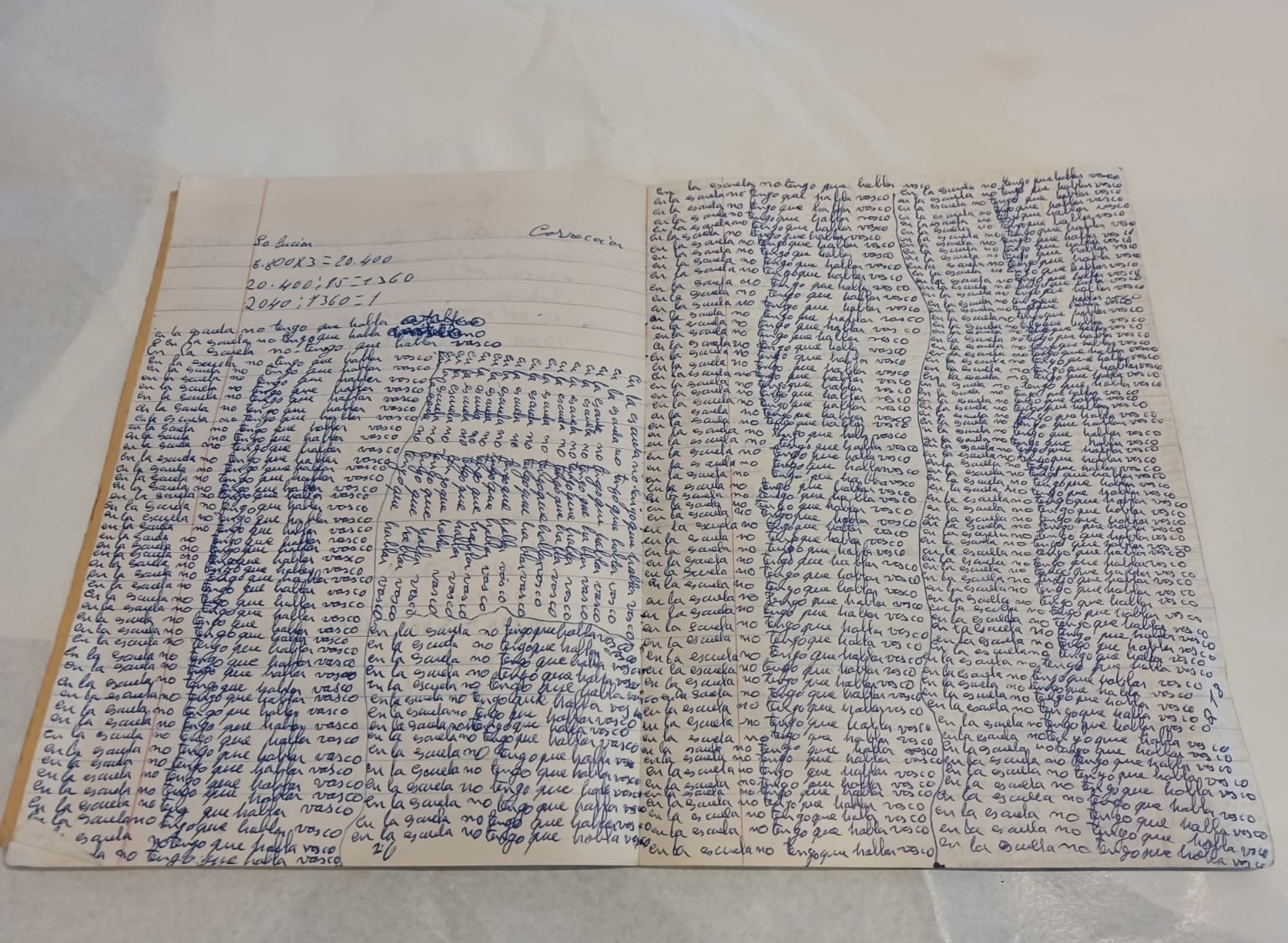
An exercise book given as punishment during Francoist Spain. The line is "En la escuela no tengo que hablar vasco" ("I must not speak in Basque at school").

Writing lines is a long-standing form of school discipline, having survived even as other old punishments such as school corporal punishment and dunce hats fell out of favour in the 20th century. In a 1985 study, over half of respondent teachers in an English-speaking country indicated awareness of the use of writing to discipline students. In 2019, a third-year secondary school student in Harbin, China, purchased a robot which automates handwriting for CN¥ 800 in order to complete a homework assignment which involved writing lines.

== In popular culture ==
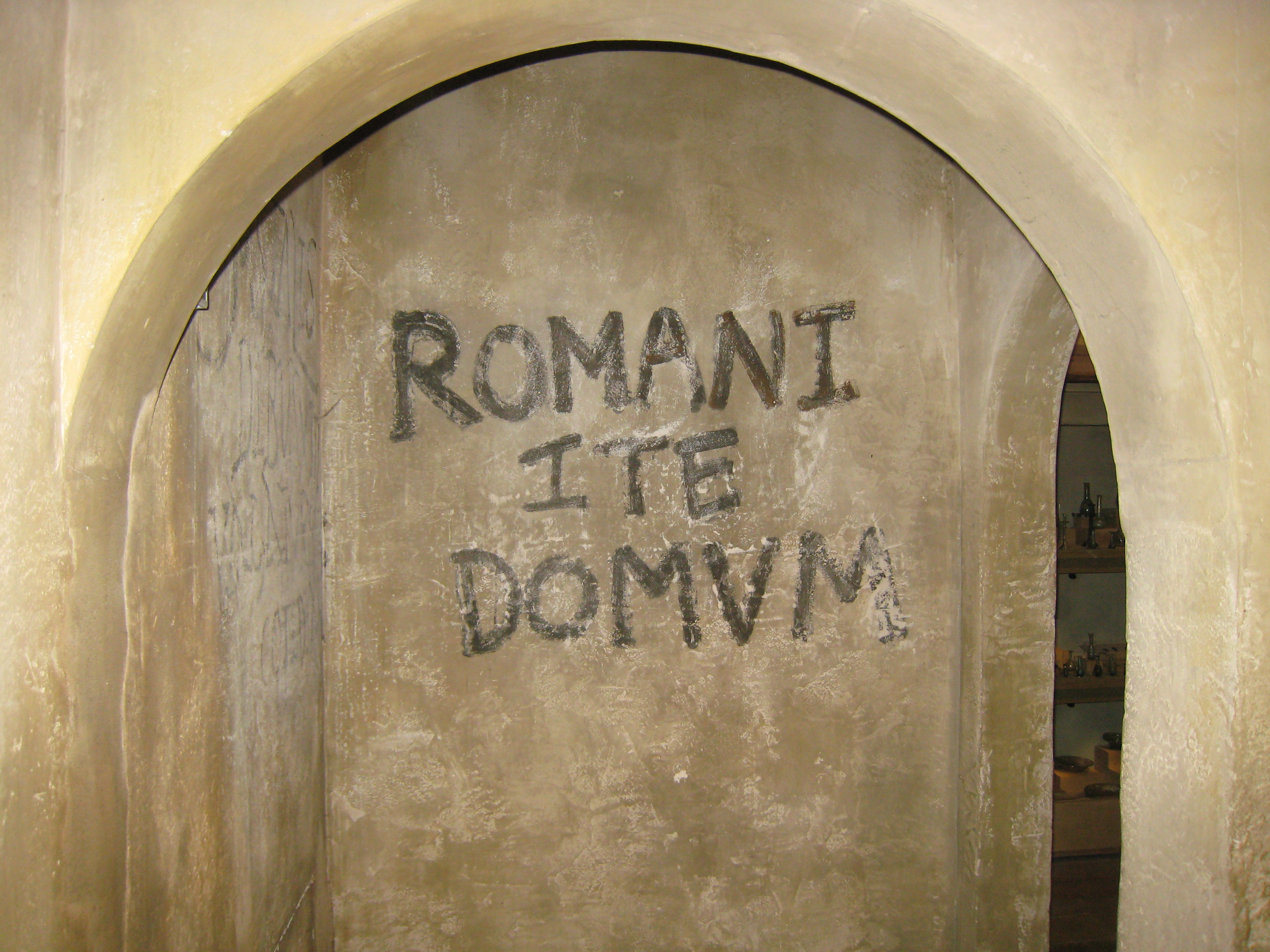
Romani ite domum on a reconstruction of a Roman settlement in Britain, in the Hull and East Riding Museum

Writing lines is frequently satirised in popular culture as "a symbol of futile, old-fashioned, one-size-fits-all schoolhouse discipline", as in the chalkboard gag seen at the beginning of many episodes of The Simpsons, where Bart Simpson writes lines on a chalkboard as a punishment. Other appearances in fiction reflect the figurative belief that "writing has the power to work back on the writer", as in Franz Kafka's 1919 short story "In the Penal Colony" in which a punishment device inscribes lines onto the bodies of criminals with a sharpened writing implement until they bleed to death, or the 2003 book Harry Potter and the Order of the Phoenix in which Harry Potter is forced to write lines with a magical quill which uses his blood as ink.

The concept was also used in a satirical way in the film Life of Brian. Brian attempts to write "Romans go home" (in Latin) on a wall of the local Roman garrison, but is spotted by a Roman soldier who notes that he has made grammatical errors ("Romanes eunt domus", "A people called the 'Romanes' they go the house?"). Once he gets the grammar right, he is ordered to write the (correct) sentence ("Romani ite domum") all over the building for the rest of the night, resulting in his future "fame" when his graffiti is discovered by the population.
