= Roman graffiti =

Aspect of ancient Roman culture

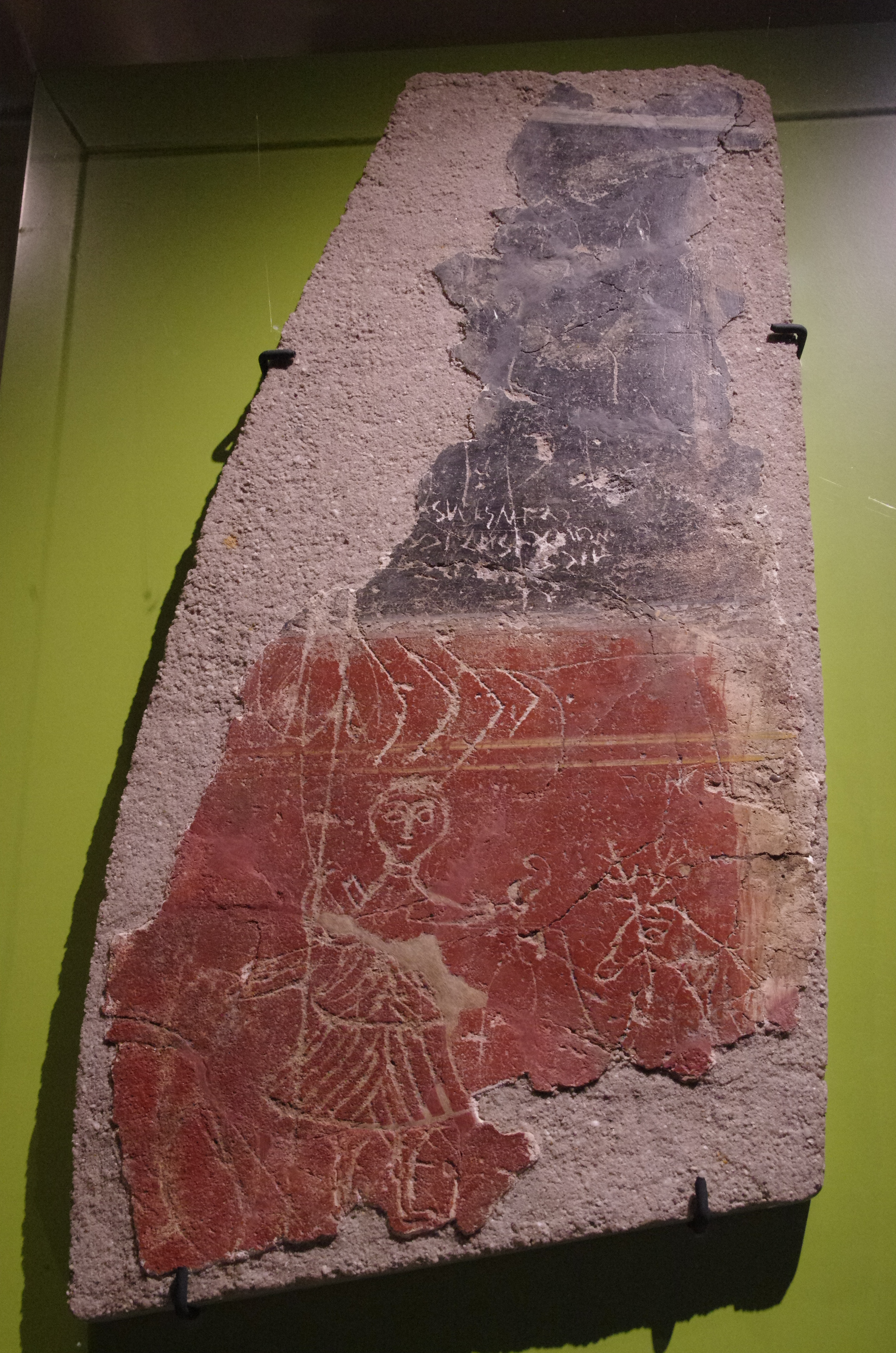
- Fragment of a plaster wall from a dwelling inscribed with graffiti including the goddess Diana and a stag. Image shows the graffiti, dating from the 2nd century to AD 275, on display in the Roman Museum at Augusta Raurica
- Language: Latin
- Geographical range: Roman Empire
- Period: Ancient Rome
- Major sites: Pompeii

In archaeological terms, graffiti (plural of graffito) are marks, images or writing scratched or engraved into a surface. There have been numerous examples found on sites of the Roman Empire, including taverns and houses, as well as on pottery of the time. In many cases the graffiti tend toward the rude, with a line etched into the basilica in Pompeii reading "Lucilla made money from her body," phallic images, as well as erotic pictures. Other graffiti took on a more innocent nature, taking the form of simple pictures or games. Although many forms of Roman graffiti are indecipherable, studying the graffiti left behind from the Roman Period can give a better understanding of the daily life and attitudes of the Roman people with conclusions drawn about how everyday Romans talked, where they spent their time, and their interactions within those spaces.

== Graffiti samples ==
Inscriptions cover a range of topics from poems, advertisements, political statements, to greetings. There are two forms of graffiti: painted inscriptions (usually public notices) and inscribed inscriptions (spontaneous messages). Many forms of graffiti also give insight to what certain locations acted as during the Roman Empire.

=== Pompeii ===
Over 11,000 graffiti samples have been uncovered in the excavations of Pompeii. Archaeologists have been studying and recording graffiti in Pompeii since the 1800s. These documentations remain the best evidence of over 90 percent of recorded graffiti from the area, which has not survived the elements. Most of the graffiti archaeologists were able to uncover took the form of friendly messages and games that required Roman numerals. Many of these recorded graffiti were found in public areas such as stairwells and entrances. Due to the simple nature of the graffiti, many archaeologists were early to dismiss the importance of the wall writings as it concerned life in ancient Pompeii. However, this thought pattern changed with the discovery of the House of Maius Castricius.

==== House of Maius Castricius ====
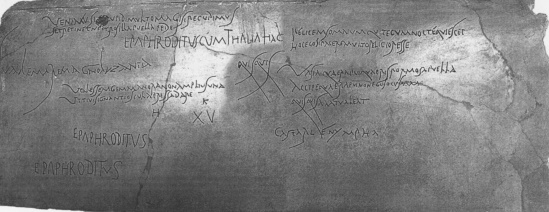
Sample of poetry from stairwell of House of Maius Castricius, Pompeii

This domestic residence shows that ancient graffiti was not limited to the public sphere, as graffiti is in modern day. This site, discovered in the 1960s, has benefited from preservation efforts, leaving the graffiti samples in their original context and remain legible. There is a unique feature of eleven graffiti containing multiple lines of poetry. For the most part, the poems are arranged vertically and respect the space of the others. This mix of original work and common phrases is not a miscellaneous group because of the number and composition; instead, it appears that a conversation has formed.

One passage on the staircase reads:

vasia quae rapui, quaeris formosa puella
accipe quae rapui non ego solus; ama.
quisquis amat valeat

Which translates to:

Beautiful girl, you seek the kisses that I stole.
Receive what I was not alone in taking; love.
Whoever loves, may she fare well.

Many of the inscriptions found in the House of Maius Castricius that blend both image and writing have been ignored by archaeologists due to errors in the form of documentation. The methodology used by the archaeological department responsible for recording the House of Maius Castricius site have focused on primarily deciphering the Latin and Greek texts of the graffiti but have no clear way of interpreting images that have no clear description accompanying them.

==== Outside the shop of Fabius Ululitremulus ====
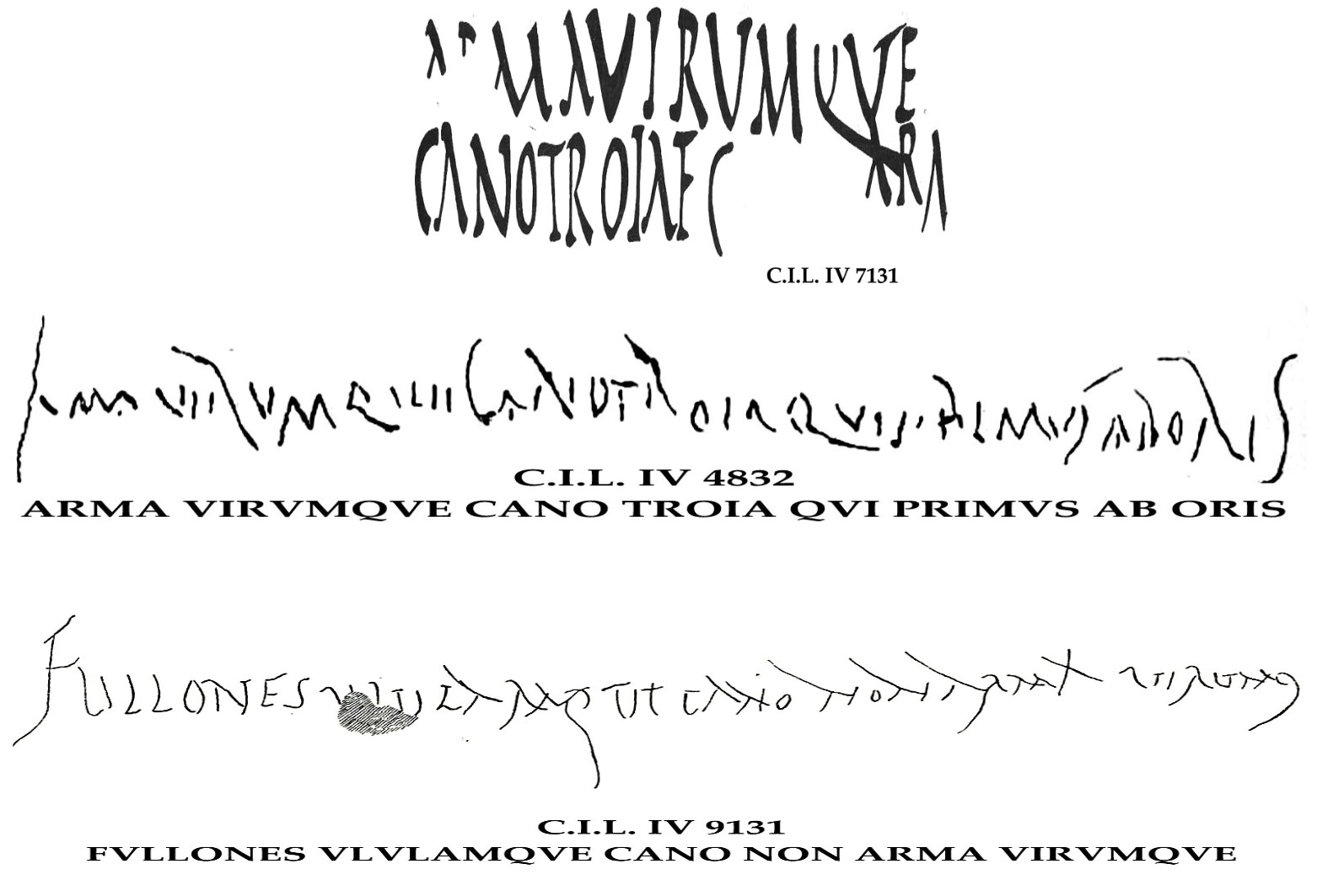
Three inscriptions referring to the opening line of the Aeneid

An example here demonstrates a familiarity with Virgil and hexameter verse. On the doorpost of the shop near pictures of Aeneas and Romulus is written:

Fullones ululamque cano, non arma virumque.

Translating to:

I sing of cloth-launderers and an owl, not arms and a man.

The owl is a signifier of Minerva, the goddess who has been said to be protector over the profession of fullones.

Mary Beard notes that there are more than fifty examples of graffiti referring to Virgil in Pompeii alone, but also notes that the majority of the references are to the opening lines of Book 1 or Book 2 of the Aeneid, suggesting that these lines may have been widely known in the way "To be, or not to be" is known today.

==== Ovid's Heroides 4 ====
One finding in Pompeii that was uncommon was a literary-based inscription referring to Ovid's Heroides 4. Heroides 4 was a poem about the Greek character Phaedra falling in love with her husband's son, Hippolytus. This graffiti found in particular was located next to a painting describing the Roman mythical version of Pompeii. Similar to the House of Maius Castricius, there have been few ways to interpret images to graffiti; however, archaeologists have used the Heroides 4 graffiti to show that Roman citizens possibly were able to understand art in a refined manner, both for the literary reference as well as the painting of Pompeii.

==== Calos graffiti ====
One popular term found in many of the discovered graffiti walls in Pompeii was calos, a Latin translation of the Greek word for beauty. Initially starting as a form of praise for upstanding citizens in Greek pottery, calos found its way into becoming a popular Pompeian graffiti writing sometime during the first-century. Calos was typically used before someone's name, for example:

"calos Castrensis"

translates to:

"beautiful Castrensis"

The calos graffiti has been assumed by archaeologists to have been used for listing sexual partners, describing sexual conduct, and prostitution specifically locations of brothels. Calos helps us understand some typical graffiti writings that citizens of Pompeii might have had strong association with.

=== Roman Market in Athens ===
An archaeological excavation of the Roman Agora in Athens discovered a nearly perfectly preserved row of columns that contain Roman graffiti. Many of the inscriptions have been interpreted by archaeologists as pertaining to Christianity which began to become a popular religion in Athens later in the Roman Empire. Other inscriptions include possible names of writers that vary from common Roman names to cryptic Roman names most likely to hide the author.

=== Britannia ===
Ancient graffiti has been found on sites in the Roman province of Britannia. In 2022, a piece of lewd graffiti, dated to around the 3rd century AD, was found on the site of Vindolanda, near Hadrian’s Wall in northern England. It had a phallic description and was translated by historians to say “Secundius the shitter”.

=== Dialogues ===
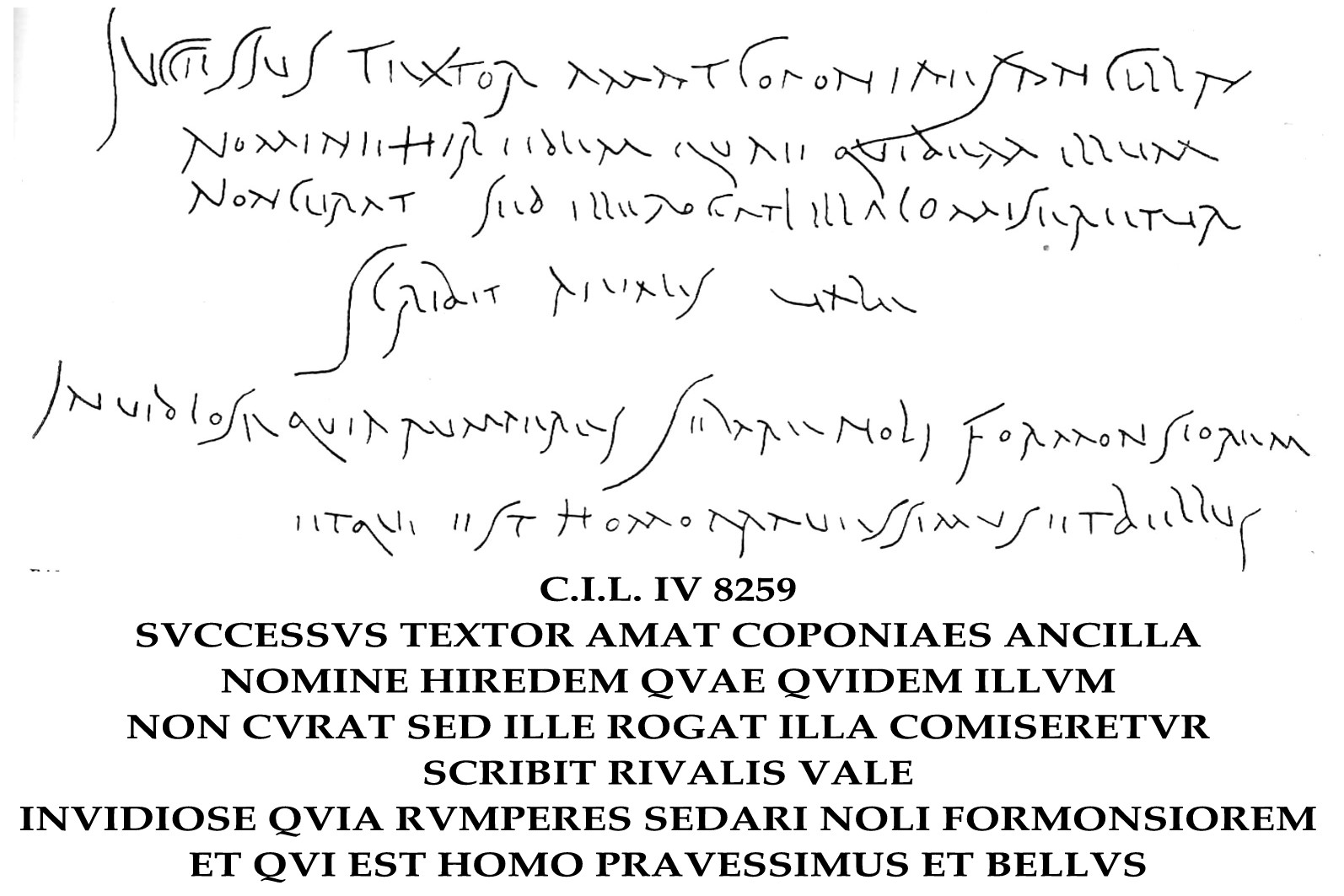
Inscription dialogue

Graffiti is often meant to be seen and expects to be read. A dialogue is formed between the reader and the inscription and can be simple as they speak directly to the readers in forms such as "if anyone sits here, let him read this before everything else..." as well as "He who writes this is in love... and I who reads this am a prick."

There are also dialogues where one passage answers another. These responses take the forms of greetings, insults, prayers, etc.

Successus textor amat coponiaes ancilla(m)
nomine Hiredem quae quidem illum
non curat sed ille rogat illa com(m)iseretur
scribit rivalis vale

Translates to:

Successus the weaver is in love with the slave of the
Innkeeper, whose name is Iris. She doesn't care about
him at all, but he asks that she take pity on him.
A rival wrote this

A response to this translates to:

You're so jealous you're bursting. Don't tear down
someone more handsome―
a guy who could beat you up and who is good-looking.

=== Games and riddles ===
Word squares (magic square) and riddles are also common forms of the culture of graffiti. In addition to this, many games played through graffiti also use numbers through the use of Roman numerals. These show a level of mental agility and flexibility of language.

=== Children ===
Examples of handwritten alphabets are common graffiti in Pompeii and could be evidence of children practicing their alphabet. This lends to the argument that children were responsible for much of the graffiti. However, the height of the inscriptions and location may contradict this.

== Commentary ==
Around 100 AD, Plutarch wrote: "There is nothing written in them which is either useful or pleasing – only so-and-so 'remembers' so-and-so, and 'wishes him the best', and is 'the best of his friends', and many things full of such ridiculousness".

Twenty-first century scholars have found more to study and enjoy in the visual art and intertextuality of Roman graffiti.

More than simply text and thought, Roman graffiti give insight into the use of space and how people interacted within it. Studying the motivation behind the marks reveals a trend for the graffiti to be located where people spend time and pass most frequently as they move through a space. Common places for graffiti are staircases, central peristyle, and vestibule. The use of graffiti by Romans has been said to be very different from the defacing trends of modern day, with the text blending into the walls and rooms by respecting the frescoes and decoration with the use of small letters. In this way, the environment influences the graffiti by subject and organization, and the graffiti in turn changes and influences the environment.

== Purposes ==
Roman graffiti could convey many different meanings. Some graffiti had political messages, some advertised products, others communicated miscellaneous information. Often-times political graffiti would appear during times of conflict, critiquing notable politicians. According to Plutarch, Brutus was convinced to assassinate Julius Caesar by such writings. Suetonius also records that the public began to hate Nero after they saw graffiti criticizing him, and Cicero notes that people would draw graffiti insulting Verres' wife.

Some graffiti includes names. At Pompeii a man named Decimus Lucretius Valens is mentioned, as well as two women named Valentina and Lusta. Roman graffiti also often contained sexual innuendos. Archaeologists can use the amount of graffiti in an area to determine the level of social interaction which took place there; since it often conveys the thoughts and name of the graffitist, it can help identify the people who were in the locations, and their ideas and actions. For a long time, graffiti were predominantly associated with men, however, archaeologists have discovered many inscriptions that indicate that women were also involved in their making, which is critical as it raises new light on women's literacy. American classical epigraphist Rebecca Benefiel explains, that we find more male names, simply because men would be interacting more in the public spheres.

== Studying graffiti ==
Typical techniques when studying graffiti include drawing each inscription and taking photographs if special attention is required. When only a shadow of the engravings is visible to the naked eye, other methods of observance are needed to decipher the engravings. Using 3D laser profilometers to analyze the roughness of a surface, archaeologists have been able to determine the tools used in engraving. This technique merged with photographs taken with oblique light, different lighting conditions, and results from electrostatic detection devices have increased the readability of illegible inscriptions.

== Appearance ==
Graffiti drawn by children usually follows a consistent set of rules, growing more realistic as the child ages. Their drawings consist of several regular geometrical shapes combined to create a more complex drawing; one piece of surviving graffiti shows a drawing of a human created using a cross and an oval. When drawing family members, children differentiated them by changing the height of each figure. If the child wished to depict someone holding something, usually the torso would remain upright while the rest of the body changed position. When body parts such as ears are depicted they never come into contact with the limbs; when drawing an animal, a child would draw a humanoid figure and then draw ears on the top of their head.

== In popular media ==
- Roman graffiti was parodied in the 1979 film Monty Python's Life of Brian in a particular scene where the character Brian is forced to write in Latin "Romans go home".

== See also ==
- Kalos inscription
- Lupanar (Pompeii)
- Alexamenos graffito (a.k.a. the "blasphemous graffito", or the "Jesus donkey")
