= The Pythons (film) =

BBC documentary film about the Monty Python team

- Title card
- Genre: Documentary
- Starring: Graham Chapman; John Cleese; Terry Gilliam; Eric Idle; Terry Jones; Michael Palin
- Narrated by: Iain Johnstone
- Country of origin: United Kingdom
- Original language: English

Production
- Producer: Iain Johnstone
- Editor: Heather Small
- Camera setup: John Walker
- Running time: 50 minutes

Original release
- Network: BBC 1
- Release: 20 June 1979

The Pythons is a BBC documentary film about the Monty Python team which was shot in Tunisia in 1978 during the making of Monty Python's Life of Brian. As well as promoting their upcoming film, the documentary also serves as a tenth anniversary profile of the team, despite the original broadcast date of 20 June 1979 being some months ahead of both the tenth anniversary of their TV debut (in October) and the UK release of their new film (in November).

== Summary ==
The film begins with a recap of the Pythons' solo activities since the release of Monty Python and the Holy Grail in 1975. These include Eric Idle's Rutland Weekend Television, John Cleese's Fawlty Towers, Michael Palin and Terry Jones' Ripping Yarns, Terry Gilliam's Jabberwocky and Graham Chapman's The Odd Job. The origins of Monty Python's Flying Circus are briefly covered and the film also features separately filmed comments, notably from Graham Chapman and John Cleese, about their fellow team members. The atmosphere is relaxed throughout and, unsurprisingly, frequently humorous.

At one point the team are joined by Spike Milligan, who happened to be holidaying in Tunisia and ended up performing a cameo role in the film.

The Pythons was released as an extra on the 1999 Criterion Collection DVD of Monty Python's Life of Brian in the US. It was later released in the UK on the 2003 Region 2 DVD of the film. The 2007 DVD/Blu-ray "Immaculate Edition" release of the film did not include the documentary.

== Cast ==
- Graham Chapman
- John Cleese
- Terry Gilliam
- Eric Idle
- Terry Jones
- Michael Palin
- Carol Cleveland
- Charles McKeown
- Spike Milligan

== Credits ==
- Maureen Hammond - Research
- John Walker - Film Cameraman
- John Hills-Harrop - Sound
- Rod Guest - Dubbing Mixer
- Heather Small - Film Editor
- Iain Johnstone - Producer
