= Eric the Half-a-Bee =

Single by Monty Python

from the album Monty Python's Previous Record
- B-side: "Yangtse Song"
- Released: 17 November 1972
- Genre: Comedy
- Label: Charisma
- Songwriter(s): John Cleese; Eric Idle
- Producer(s): Andre Jacquemin; Michael Palin; Terry Jones; Alan Bailey

Monty Python singles chronology
"Spam Song" (1972)	"Eric the Half-a-Bee" (1972)	"Teach Yourself Heath" (1972)

"Eric the Half-a-Bee" is a song by the British comedy troupe Monty Python that was composed by Eric Idle with lyrics co-written with John Cleese. It first appeared as the A-side of the group's second 7" single, released in a mono mix on 17 November 1972, with a stereo mix appearing three weeks later on the group's third LP Monty Python's Previous Record. On this album, the song followed the routine called "Fish Licence" in which Mr Eric Praline, played by Cleese, tried to obtain a pet licence for an halibut and numerous other pets all named Eric, much to the chagrin of the licence office worker (Michael Palin). One such pet is half a bee. The song relates the tale of the half-a-bee, having been "bisected accidentally" by his owner one summer's afternoon.

The lyrics raise philosophical questions as to the existence or not of half a bee: "Half a bee, philosophically, must ipso facto half not be. But half the bee has got to be, vis-à-vis its entity – d'you see? But can a bee be said to be or not to be an entire bee when half the bee is not a bee, due to some ancient injury?"

The song ends with Cleese saying he loves his pet half-a-bee "semi-carnally", which Palin mishears as Cyril Connolly, a British writer and literary critic.

It is one of Cleese's personal favourite sketches. On more than one occasion, Cleese has expressed his regret in not having the song follow "Fish Licence" in the sketch's airing on Monty Python's Flying Circus (Episode 23, "Scott of the Antarctic" 1970) as he describes himself as "most unmusical."

More than half a century later, Cleese returned to the song, when he performed a version of it on his TV show The Dinosaur Hour.

== Personnel ==
- John Cleese – lead vocals
- Eric Idle – acoustic guitar, backing vocals
- Neil Innes – piano
- The Fred Tomlinson Singers – backing vocals
- Michael Palin – spoken word
