= What has the BBC ever... =

1986 and 2026 promotional films for the BBC

What has the BBC ever given us?, and What has the BBC ever done for me? are two promotional films produced by the British Broadcasting Corporation (BBC), released in 1986 and 2026 respectively. The 1986 version featured Monty Python member John Cleese asking a pub-barman "What has the BBC ever done for me?", in the style of his Life of Brian character asking "What have the Romans ever done for us?". The 2026 version is fronted by comedian Romesh Ranganathan. Each version showcases broadcasters, actors, journalists and performers answering the question, with each of the two main stars continually rejecting the responses. While the original is set completely in a pub, the 2026 version shows Ranganathan travelling through the EastEnders' Queen Vic pub before moving through different BBC production sets to highlight the breadth of the broadcaster's services. Only Fools and Horses star David Jason appears in both versions.

== Background ==
The BBC is the national public broadcaster in the United Kingdom. Its funding model is based on the TV licence. In order to promote compliance among licence fee payers, the corporation creates campaigns to showcase the work it does.

== 1986 campaign ==
=== Background ===
In 1985, Margaret Thatcher appointed the Peacock Committee, chaired by Alan Peacock to examine funding options for the BBC. The corporation took steps to highlight its importance and impact including with the production of this film.

=== Advertisement ===
The 1986 version featured Monty Python member John Cleese asking a pub-barman—portrayed by Michael Hordern—"What has the BBC ever done for me?", in the style of his Life of Brian character asking "What have the Romans ever done for us?". Other punters in the bar interject with responses about the genre of content they are responsible for (actors for drama, sports commentators for cricket, horse racing, athletics, tennis, newsreaders for news). Cleese begrudgingly accepts their cumulative points, before telling Terry Wogan (on the TV) to "shut up" when he reminds him about chat shows. The film stated that the licence fee was £58, equivalent to "16p a day".

== 2026 campaign ==
=== Background ===
The BBC Charter is due for renewal in December 2027. The BBC made the 2026 campaign as a defensive move to combat declining Television licence payers and protect its future funding ahead of crucial political negotiations over the BBC Charter, amid several immediate pressures facing the corporation.

=== Production ===
The film was directed by Dougal Wilson, Sets used include the Queen Vic pub from EastEnders; BBC News; and The Graham Norton Show.

=== Advertisement ===
The 2026 version shows Romesh Ranganathan travelling through the EastEnders' Queen Vic pub (with Coldplay's Chris Martin on piano), past Daleks, through the sets of Casualty and Strictly Come Dancing, among others, to highlight the breadth of the broadcaster's services. Only Fools and Horses star David Jason appears in both versions. The broadcaster chose to premiere the star-studded advert during the high-viewing halftime slot of the 2026 FIFA World Cup final.

== Reception ==
=== 1986 ===
In the 2020s, the 1986 trailer was brought back into public consciousness, with several public figures sharing links to the film. At the time, historian Tom Holland and actor Simon Day pointed out that many of the claims about the quality of the BBC's output were no longer accurate.

=== 2026 ===
Rachel McGrath of The Independent described the 2026 version as "dividing the nation". The Daily Telegraph's Michael Deacon described the ad as "smug".

== Appearances ==
=== 1986 ===
- John Cleese
- Michael Hordern
- David Attenborough
- Barry Norman
- Peter Alliss
- David Coleman
- Peter O'Sullevan
- Fred Perry
- Steve Davis
- Esther Rantzen
- John Humphrys
- Sue Lawley
- Moira Stuart
- David Dimbleby
- Peter Snow
- Alan Whicker
- Mike Read
- Peter Duncan
- Janet Ellis
- Simon Groom
- Goldie
- Patrick Moore
- David Jason
- Ronnie Corbett
- Ronnie Barker
- Ken Campbell
- Bob Geldof
- Terry Wogan

=== 2026 ===
- Romesh Ranganathan
- Pierre Counihan-Moullier
- Kitty Castledine
- Diane Parish
- Paul Merton
- Katie Thistleton
- Jane Slaughter
- Sue Perkins
- Greg James
- Gillian Taylforth
- Molly Rainford
- Tyler West
- Chris Martin
- Emma Barton
- Jason Mohammad
- Adam Woodyatt
- Sir David Jason
- Gloria Hunniford
- Claudia Winkleman
- Nick Grimshaw
- Trevor Nelson
- Dr Xand van Tulleken
- Lolly Adefope
- Rudolph Walker
- Pudsey Bear
- Anita Rani
- Aaron Thiara
- Jack Saunders
- Julia Somerville
- Louise Minchin
- David Attenborough - voice
- Stacey Solomon
- Shaquille Ali-Yebuah
- Don Gilet
- Shantol Jackson
- Catherine Garton
- Don Warrington
- Alan Carr
- Charley Marlowe
- George Webster
- Harrison Devine
- Katie Devine
- Julie Wilson Nimmo
- Shabaz Ali
- Shini Muthukrishnan
- Abby Cook
- DNLISH
- Ruth Jones
- Dalek
- Milo Clarke
- Charles Venn
- Elinor Lawless
- Olly Rix
- Mr Tumble
- Ashley Jensen
- Gbemisola Ikumelo
- Feathers McGraw
- Clive Myrie
- Sara Cox
- Chris McCausland
- Tomasz Schafernaker
- Graham Norton
- Cate Blanchett
- James Nesbitt
- Daisy Ridley
- Peter Capaldi
- Alex Gray
- Zack George
- Montell Douglas
- Sheli McCoy
- Tom Wilson
- Remi Burgz
- Vernon Kay
- Katie Derham
- Lauren Laverne
- Nikita Kanda
- Anna Foster
- Nick Robinson
- Clare Balding
- Andy Day
- Michaela Strachan
- Hey Duggee
- Helen George
- Jenny Agutter
- Louis Theroux
- Julian Caillon
- Katya Jones
- Nancy Xu
- Alexis Warr
- BBC Concert Orchestra
- Anton Du Beke

== See also ==
- Perfect Day (BBC promotion)
- Timeline of the BBC
