= Romani ite domum =

Latin phrase

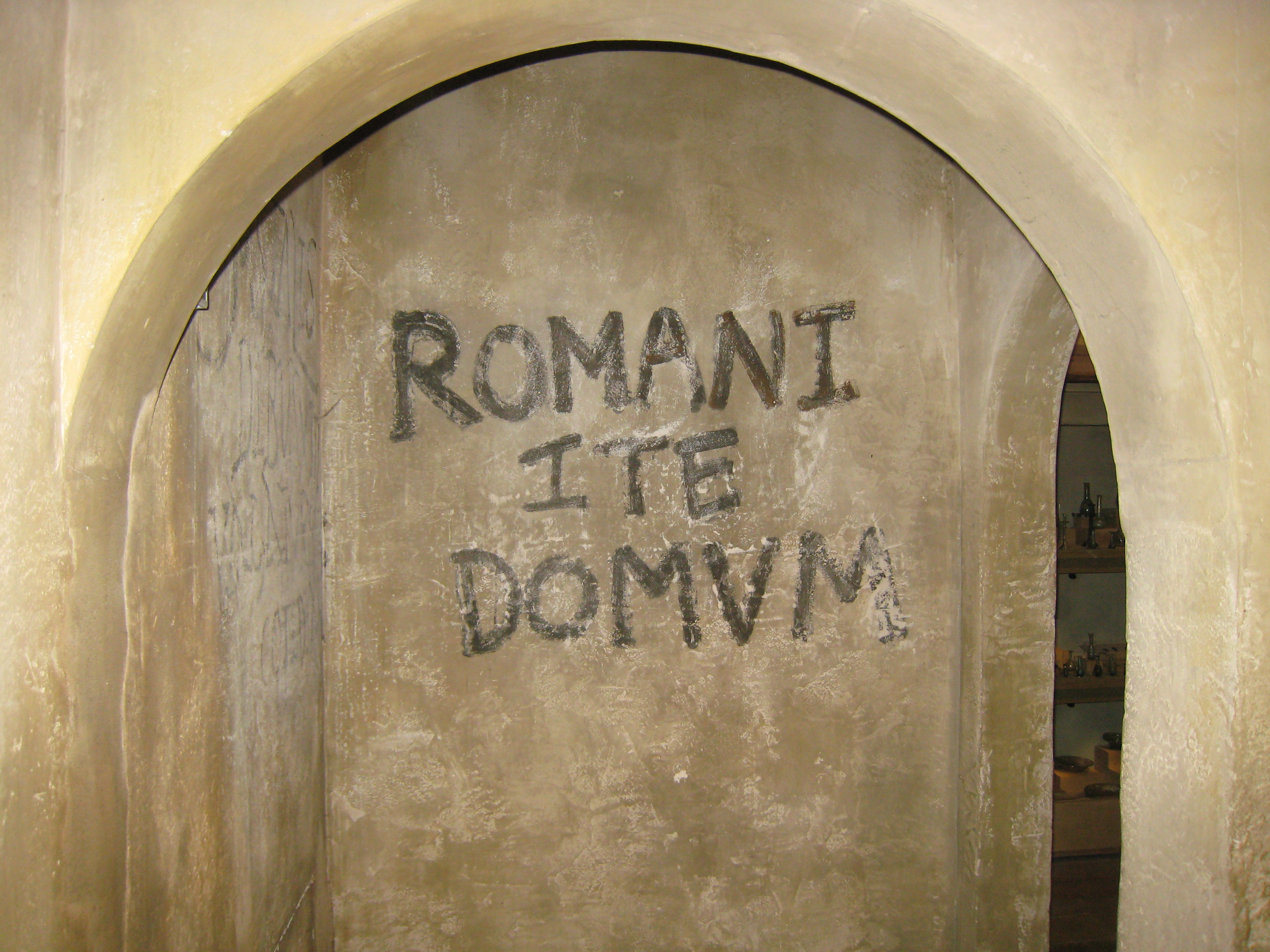
Romani ite domum on a reconstruction of a Roman settlement in Britain, in the Hull and East Riding Museum

"Romani ite domum" (English: Romans go home) is the corrected Latin phrase for the graffito "Romanes eunt domus" from a scene in the film Monty Python's Life of Brian.

== Life of Brian ==
The scene features John Cleese as a centurion and Graham Chapman as Brian, at that stage a would-be member of the revolutionary group the "People's Front of Judea". To prove himself worthy to be a member of the group, Brian has to daub the anti-Roman slogan "Romans go home" on the walls of Governor Pontius Pilate's palace in Jerusalem, under cover of darkness, written in Latin for the Romans to read.

He completes the phrase Romanes eunt domus when he is caught by a centurion. Brian is terrified and clearly expects to be killed on the spot. Instead, the centurion corrects Brian's grammatical mistakes in the manner of a traditional Latin teacher, as he has written "People called 'Romanes' they go the house". He forces Brian to use the proper imperative verb form and accusative case and write the correct phrase, Romani ite domum, one hundred times, threatening to "cut [his] balls off" if he has not done so by sunrise. Brian does so, covering nearly every surface of the plaza with the graffiti, while supervised by two guards. When he finishes the task the following morning, one soldier says "don't do it again" and leaves with his comrade. Just as they leave, three other soldiers come round the corner and see the graffiti. Brian realises his position and races off, chased by the soldiers. In subsequent scenes, various Roman soldiers can be seen erasing the seditious graffiti.

== Case of domus ==
The exchange on the case of domus concludes:

Centurion: " 'Domus'? Nominative? 'Go home'? This is motion towards. Isn't it, boy?"
Brian: "Dative, sir!"
[Centurion draws his sword and holds it to Brian's throat]
Brian: "Ahh! No, not dative! Not the dative, sir! Oh, the... accusative! Accusative! 'Domum', sir! 'Ad domum'!"
Centurion: "Except that 'domus' takes the...?"
Brian: "The locative, sir!"
Centurion: "Which is...?!"
Brian: " 'Domum'."

As a number of works on Latin note, the centurion was mistaken in accepting Brian's answer of the locative case, although the result was correct. The locative case indicates presence at or in a particular place, such as a city, town, or small island. The locative of domus, meaning a house or home, would be domi. But motion toward a place or thing was indicated using the accusative of motion towards, domum being the allative construction correctly used in the final formulation of the graffito. This confusion over the use of the locative case is an example of how even those well-educated in Latin occasionally err regarding grammatical details.

== Inspiration ==
The sketch draws on Cleese's time as a teacher, between school and university. During this time he taught Latin and other subjects at a preparatory school, St. Peter's in Weston-super-Mare, mostly to children around ten years old. He recounts a time that he personally wrote out a word he had as a teacher misspelt, onto his blackboard a set number of times to demonstrate even-handedness, as an inspiration for the sketch.

He has also expressed the view that the sketch must seem incomprehensible today, as its references to learning Latin grammar are no longer a common or normal experience, as they were for grammar school children of his generation.

== Cultural significance ==
From the perspective of realism, the scene has been noted as accurately reflecting the ancientness of the practice of writing graffiti on walls as a form of political protest.

As an example of humour derived from the use of language, the scene is discussed in Cognitive Linguistics and Humor Research as an instance where the expected actions of the characters—the Romans detecting a vandal in the act and immediately arresting or punishing him—are replaced by a satirical representation of classroom discourse. The centurion is concerned not with Brian's act of vandalism, but rather with his inept Latin grammar. He proceeds to walk Brian through the process of correcting his mistakes by making him analyse each word in the sentence, thereby determining the proper grammatical form. Once Brian has arrived at the correct answer, the centurion imposes a grammar-school punishment—writing lines—instead of a period-appropriate sanction for vandals or rebels. Rather than punishing Brian for writing the graffito, the centurion instructs him to repeat the act one hundred times using good grammar. The centurion then subverts the humorous substitution of a schoolmaster-pupil relationship for that of soldier and rebel by threatening Brian with castration should he fail to complete his punishment within a reasonable amount of time.

The film's satirical use of classroom discourse as a technical exercise to distract from the realities of Roman imperialism has also been compared with the contemporary political phenomenon of diverting attention from serious social issues by focusing attention on details, such as argument over the use of gender-neutral pronouns as a means of distracting attention from discriminatory practices, harassment, and legal disabilities affecting transgender persons.
