= Teach Yourself Heath =

Single by Monty Python
- Released: December 1972 (with ZigZag)
- Genre: Comedy
- Label: Python Productions

Monty Python singles chronology
"Eric The Half A Bee" (1972)	"Teach Yourself Heath" (1972)	"Monty Python's Tiny Black Round Thing" (1974)

"Teach Yourself Heath" is the name of a one-sided 33 rpm flexi-disc by Monty Python which was given away free with issue 27 of ZigZag magazine in December 1972 and also included inside initial copies of their third album Monty Python's Previous Record.

The track is billed as "Home Tutor Language Course, Number 14 – An invaluable introduction for Beginners to the Theory and Practice of Heath". Michael Palin reads the title and some introductory material, after which Eric Idle is heard teaching the listener how to mimic the speech patterns of the then British prime minister Edward Heath (which are presented as though "Heath" is a separate language or dialect). Real extracts of Heath's voice are used to demonstrate.

As Palin explained to Time Out: "Eric and I spent a day listening to Heath's speeches; at a certain point I went to sleep...I feel the record hasn't done justice to the boredom and inanity of those party political speeches. If it is funny, thank Mr Heath for that. It's all him..."

The track was released on CD in 2006, as part of the bonus tracks on the special edition release of Monty Python's Previous Record.

== Faux record titles ==
The single's back cover lists the following entries in the Home Tutor Language Course series:

- 015 Teach yourself Barber
- 016 Teach yourself Wilson
- 017 Teach yourself Maudling * (* Deleted)
- 018 Teach yourself Nabarro* (* Mono)
- 019 Teach yourself Thatcher
- 020 More Thatcher
- 021 Advanced Thatcher for Students* (* Not available in Wales)
- 022 Teach yourself Aggro
- 023 Teach yourself Chataway
