= Fish Licence =

1970 Monty Python sketch

The Fish Licence is a sketch from Series 2 Episode 10 (Scott of the Antarctic) of the popular British television series, Monty Python's Flying Circus. It first aired on 1 December 1970.

== Plot ==
Eric Praline (John Cleese) is a put-upon customer who seeks to obtain a licence for his pet halibut, Eric, although he has difficulty explaining to the clerk (Michael Palin) how all pets should be licensed. The clerk repeatedly calls Praline a "loony", to which Praline angrily replies by naming famous people who kept odd pets. Praline even produces "a dog licence with the word 'dog' crossed out and 'cat' written in crayon", and explains that the man in the "Ministry of Housinge" cat detector van (a parody of the TV detector van) didn't have the right form. All in all, the pets Praline mentions are:

- Eric the fish (an halibut)
- Eric the dog
- Eric the cat
- Eric the fruit bat
- Eric the half bee (in the version from Monty Python's Previous Record)

In response to the clerk's assurance that there is no such thing as (and no need for) a fish licence, Praline requests a statement to that fact signed by the Lord Mayor. The superhumanly tall Lord Mayor (Graham Chapman), with full regalia and city council entourage, enters the office and hands a thunderstuck Praline the signed statement. An announcer (also Cleese) reverently narrates the exchange, ending by saying that Praline has "gone spare". The sketch then segues to the Lord Mayor and city council members playing a rugby match against the New Zealand All Blacks.

In the version of the sketch on Monty Python's Previous Record, instead of asking for a statement from the Lord Mayor, Praline asks for a bee licence, which leads to the song "Eric the Half-a-Bee".

== Trivia ==
- The UK introduced mandatory dog licenses in 1867 (updated in 1959), but ended the licensing scheme in 1988 due to widespread non-compliance. A poster for dog licensing prominently appears in the background of the sketch.
- This is one of several appearances by Eric Praline. Some others are the Dead Parrot sketch and an appearance as a link the 5th episode of the second series, "Live from the Grill-o-Mat", where he announces he will appear later in the show. He then comes in a few minutes as Inspector Praline in the Crunchy Frog sketch.
- OpenBSD's 3.5 release contained a parody track of both the Fish Licence sketch and the song "Eric the Half a Bee", titled "CARP Licence and Redundancy Must Be Free".
