= Popular Revolutionary Front for the Liberation of Palestine =

Palestinian militant group

The Popular Revolutionary Front for the Liberation of Palestine (Arabic: الجبهة الشعبية الثورية لتحرير فلسطين Al-Jabhat ash-Sha'biyah at-Thawriyah li-Tahrir Filastin) (PRFLP) was a Palestinian militant group and part of the Rejectionist Front. It was formed in February 1972, following a split from the Popular Front for the Liberation of Palestine (PFLP), which had experienced internal political strife after the crackdowns on the Palestinian movements in Jordan after the conflict in Jordan known as Black September.

Other groups that split from the PFLP included the PFLP-General Command, Organization of Arab Palestine, and the Popular Democratic Front for the Liberation of Palestine.

== Background ==
The PRFLP had its beginnings in the wake of the Black September fighting between the Palestinian militants and the Jordanian Armed Forces during September 27, 1970 to July 1971. There was a mass exodus of Palestinian fighters traveling from Jordan to Lebanon as a result of an order by King Hussein, who expelled all Palestinian fighters regardless of group affiliation due to the thousands of casualties during the conflict, most of which were Palestinian. Members of the PFLP fought among themselves, as the left-wing and right-wing leaders each blamed the others for the defeat in Jordan, leading to the left-wing faction of the PFLP breaking away to form the PRFLP. Prior to this the left-wing faction was founded via a merge of the Movement of Arab Nationalists, the Palestinian Liberation Front, Heroes of the Return and The Revenge Youth Organisation.

After the split the group was led by Abu Shibab.

== Beliefs ==
The PRFLP believed in the one-state solution to the Israeli-Palestinian conflict and rejected any ideas of political compromise. They did not recognize the state of Israel, which they felt had to be destroyed.

Their charter espoused beliefs that they were engaged in a class war that was led by a revolutionary ideology and that the main focus of their struggle lay in Palestine.

== After splitting ==
After splintering off from the PFLP, the PRFLP sought to align itself with the mainstream Fatah. They also attempted to distance itself from any Palestinians who thought the group to be jihad, as the PRFLP wanted to separate the struggles of the Palestinian people from Islamic Jihad. The PRFLP did not conduct any known terrorist attacks following its split from the PFLP, and instead served as a left-wing Marxist-Leninist political group.
