= Monty Python's Previous Record =

Studio album by Monty Python
- Released: 8 December 1972 (UK); 1973 (US)
- Recorded: 12–13 October 1972
- Studio: Radio Luxembourg Studios, London
- Genre: Comedy
- Length: 45:23
- Label: Charisma (UK) / Charisma/Buddah (US)
- Producer: Andre Jacquemin; Michael Palin; Terry Jones; Alan Bailey

Monty Python chronology
Another Monty Python Record (1971)	Monty Python's Previous Record (1972)	The Monty Python Matching Tie and Handkerchief (1973)

Professional ratings
Review scores
Source	Rating
Allmusic	3/5 stars

Monty Python's Previous Record is the third album by Monty Python. Released in 1972, it marked the group's first collaborations with regular sound engineer Andre Jacquemin as well as musician Neil Innes, who had previously appeared with future members of the Python team on Do Not Adjust Your Set. The album contains many sketches from the third series of Flying Circus, one (Fish Licence) from the second as well as an abridged version of "The Tale of Happy Valley" from the second German show. The album was released midway through the broadcast of Series 3, whose sketches featured on the album were all from its first half, with the exception of "Dennis Moore" which aired a month later and therefore made its debut here. The oldest sketch on the album, Eric Idle's "Radio Quiz Game", dates back to I'm Sorry, I'll Read That Again, where it was performed by Graeme Garden – Idle having subsequently performed the sketch himself on two editions of Do Not Adjust Your Set. The rest of the material was specially written for the album.

Among the proposed ideas for the record were a 'B' side consisting of four concentric tracks, all starting at different places on the first groove, so that the listener could get any of one of four different versions of the 'B' side". When this proved impossible, a three-sided 'B' side was attempted. But as Jacquemin later explained, "That's why you hear 'and now a massage from the Swedish Prime Minister' three times on it. Each groove was going to start with that, but unfortunately, the three grooves ran into each other towards the centre of the record. In the end, we cut all the bits together for a standard, single-groove side." A year later, a less ambitious version of the same idea, with just two concentric tracks, would be used on the next Monty Python LP, The Monty Python Matching Tie and Handkerchief.

The cover design, by Terry Gilliam, pictured an elongated arm which wrapped around both sides of the sleeve. Its hand can be seen trying to catch a six-breasted woman with butterfly wings. The inner sleeve pictured the covers of sixteen fictional albums on one side, with the other containing the album credits and lyrics to the "Yangtse Song".

The original British vinyl release included a separate 33 rpm 7-inch flexi-disc entitled Teach Yourself Heath, housed in a sleeve featuring a picture of then prime minister Edward Heath.

The album was trailed three weeks earlier on 17 November 1972 by the 7-inch single Eric The Half-A-Bee/Yangtse Song (CB.200), credited to "Monty Python With Niel (sic) Innes". These were alternate mono mixes of two tracks which would appear in stereo on the album. The latter song had an added karaoke section with additional linking from Michael Palin.

"Summarize Proust Competition" was recorded but cut from the album, although a reference to the Proust Song remains on the album's inner sleeve. The track was released five years later on the Instant Record Collection compilation. Another cut sketch, "Bells", eventually found its way onto 1980's Contractual Obligation Album.

As with the previous record, initial UK pressings had a unique label. Both sides featured the "Mad Hatter" Charisma design, with the first side listed as "'A' side and half 'B' side" (in reference to the album's single release) and a list of contents by "a Harley Street Dentist". The second side was listed as "This side" and contained a series of teeth-cleaning instructions. Later pressings were issued with the standard Charisma label, omitting the dentally-themed text. The US version, released in 1973, had the "Harley Street Dentist" material from the UK A-side label switched to Side B, with the A side eschewing the teeth-cleaning instructions of the UK version in favour of a red label containing the actual track listing for both sides. This, too, was different from the UK version, removing the tracks "How To Do It" and "Radio Quiz Game" from Side 1 and placing them on Side 2.

The album reached No.39 in the UK album chart.

The track "Wonderful World of Sound" features the earliest known citation of the phrase "something for the weekend", a euphemistic reference to condoms used by barbers when offering them to their clientele. The bonus tracks on the 2006 CD reissue feature many previously unreleased out-takes from the album's sessions, with newly added music and sound effects, alongside outtakes from the 1980 Contractual Obligation Album sessions and 1971 promos for Monty Python's Big Red Book.

The 2014 vinyl reissue by Virgin Records Limited contains the UK version of the album and does not include any bonus tracks.

== UK Track listing ==
=== Side one ===
1. Introduction
2. Are You Embarrassed Easily?
3. A Book at Bedtime
4. Dennis Moore
5. Money Programme
6. Money Song
7. Dennis Moore (Part 2)
8. Dennis Moore Song
9. Australian Table Wine
10. Dennis Moore Song (Part 2)
11. Argument Clinic
12. How To Do It
13. Dennis Moore Song (Part 3)
14. Pepperpots
15. Personal Freedom
16. Dennis Moore Song (Part 4)
17. Fish Licence
18. Eric the Half-a-Bee
19. Radio Quiz Game
20. Travel Agent

=== Side two ===
1. Massage From The Swedish Prime Minister
2. Silly Noises
3. Anne Elk
4. Yangtse Sketch
5. Yangtse Song
6. Massage From The Swedish Prime Minister (Part 2)
7. A Minute Passed
8. Eclipse of the Sun
9. Alistair Cooke
10. Wonderful World of Sound
11. Funerals at Prestatyn
12. Massage From The Swedish Prime Minister (Part 3)
13. Happy Valley

== US Track listing ==
=== Side one ===
1. Introduction
2. Are You Embarrassed Easily?
3. A Book at Bedtime
4. Dennis Moore
5. Money Programme
6. Money Song
7. Dennis Moore (Part 2)
8. Dennis Moore Song
9. Australian Table Wine
10. Dennis Moore Song (Part 2)
11. Argument Clinic
12. Dennis Moore Song (Part 3)
13. Pepperpots
14. Personal Freedom
15. Dennis Moore Song (Part 4)
16. Fish Licence
17. Eric the Half-a-Bee
18. Travel Agent

=== Side two ===
1. Radio Quiz Game
2. Massage From The Swedish Prime Minister
3. Silly Noises
4. Anne Elk
5. Yangtse Sketch
6. Yangtse Song
7. How To Do It
8. Massage From The Swedish Prime Minister (Part 2)
9. A Minute Passed
10. Eclipse of the Sun
11. Alistair Cooke
12. Wonderful World of Sound
13. Funerals at Prestatyn
14. Massage From The Swedish Prime Minister (Part 3)
15. Happy Valley

=== 2006 Bonus tracks ===
1. Baxter's
2. Meteorology
3. Blood, Devastation, War & Horror
4. The Great Debate
5. Mortuary Visit
6. Flying Fox Of The Yard
7. Is There
8. Teach Yourself Heath
9. The Book Ad
10. Big Red Bowl
11. Pepperpots (Part 2)
12. Pellagra

== Personnel ==
- Graham Chapman
- John Cleese
- Terry Gilliam
- Eric Idle
- Terry Jones
- Michael Palin

=== Additional performers ===
- Carol Cleveland
- The Fred Tomlinson Singers
- Neil Innes (music)

== Music credits ==
The following is the list of musical works included on the album. They comprise a mixture of Studio G library music, self-penned Python songs and specially composed music by Neil Innes.

1. Fashion Parade (J. Pearson)
2. Alla Handel (H. Wild)
3. Sporting News (P. Lewis)
4. Money Song (Eric Idle & John Gould)
5. Dennis Moore (Robin Hood Theme) (Carl Sigman)
6. Happy Movement (J. Harpham)
7. Eric The Half A Bee (John Cleese & Eric Idle)
8. Holiday Time (J. Pearson)
9. Beethoven's Fifth (Arr. Cliff Johns)
10. Comic Giggles (J. Pearson)
11. Beachy Head (R. Cornford)
12. Yangtse Song (Michael Palin, Terry Jones & Neil Innes)
13. Medieval Fanfares (Cliff Johns)
14. Great Adventure Suite (Cliff Johns)
15. Fairytale Music (Neil Innes)
16. Ya De Bucketty (Terry Jones)
17. Television Tensions (P. Lewis)
