= Monty Python's Life of Brian =

1979 film by Terry Jones

- Theatrical release poster
- Directed by: Terry Jones
- Written by: Graham Chapman; John Cleese; Terry Gilliam; Eric Idle; Terry Jones; Michael Palin
- Produced by: John Goldstone
- Starring: Graham Chapman; John Cleese; Terry Gilliam; Eric Idle; Terry Jones; Michael Palin
- Cinematography: Peter Biziou
- Edited by: Julian Doyle
- Music by: Geoffrey Burgon
- Production companies: HandMade Films; Python (Monty) Pictures
- Distributed by: Cinema International Corporation
- Release dates: 17 August 1979 (United States); 8 November 1979 (United Kingdom)
- Running time: 94 minutes
- Country: United Kingdom
- Language: English
- Budget: $4 million
- Box office: $20.7 million

Monty Python's Life of Brian is a 1979 British black comedy film starring and written by the comedy group Monty Python (Graham Chapman, John Cleese, Terry Gilliam, Eric Idle, Terry Jones, and Michael Palin). Directed by Jones, the film incorporates surrealism and satire which parodies the biblical history of the birth and death of Jesus Christ. The film tells the story of Brian Cohen (played by Chapman), a young Judaean man who is born on the same day as—and next door to—Jesus, and is subsequently mistaken for the Messiah.

Following the withdrawal of funding by EMI Films just days before production was scheduled to begin, musician and former Beatle George Harrison and his business partner Denis O'Brien arranged financing for Life of Brian through the formation of their HandMade Films company.

The film's themes of religious satire were controversial at the time of its release, drawing accusations of blasphemy and protests from some religious groups. In the United Kingdom, the film was given an AA (14) rating by the British Board of Film Classification, though 11 local councils outright banned the film, while a further 28 raised the rating from AA to X across their jurisdictions. (This certificate would later be amended, from AA to 15 in 1988, and from 15 to 12A in 2019.) Some countries, including Ireland and Norway, banned its showing; and, in a few of these, such as Italy, bans lasted over a decade. The filmmakers used the notoriety to promote the film, with posters in Sweden reading, "So funny it was banned in Norway!"

The film was a box office success. It was the fourth highest-grossing film in the United Kingdom in 1979 and the highest-grossing of any British film in the United States that year. It has remained popular and has been named as the greatest comedy film of all time by several magazines and television networks. In a 2006 Channel 4 poll, Life of Brian was ranked first on their list of the 50 Greatest Comedy Films.

== Plot ==
Brian Cohen is born in a stable next door to Jesus, which initially confuses the three wise men who come to praise the future King of the Jews. He grows up into an idealistic young man who resents the continuing Roman occupation of Judea.

While listening to Jesus' Sermon on the Mount, Brian becomes infatuated with a young rebel named Judith Iscariot. His desire for her and hatred of the Romans, further exacerbated by his scolding mother, Mandy Cohen, revealing that Brian himself is half-Roman, inspire him to join the "People's Front of Judea" (PFJ). This is one of many fractious and bickering independence movements that spend more time fighting each other than the Romans.

PFJ leader Reg tasks Brian to paint slogans overnight on Roman governor Pontius Pilate's palace, but a Roman officer catches him in the act. However, the officer shows more concern with Brian's Latin grammar than the act itself, and after correcting the slogan to "Romani ite domum", orders him to write it on the wall one hundred times. Brian finishes after sunrise and is chased by guards before being rescued by Judith.

Reg gives a revolutionary speech to the PFJ, asking, "What have the Romans ever done for us?" At this point, the listeners outline all forms of positive aspects of the Roman occupation such as sanitation, medicine, education, wine, public order, irrigation, roads, a fresh water system, public health and peace. He then outlines plans to kidnap Pilate's wife.

However, inside Pilate's palace, the PFJ encounters another revolutionary group, the Campaign for a Free Galilee; an argument ensues over who came up with the plan first, and all except Brian kill each other, leading Brian to be captured by the palace guards. The guards bring Brian before Pilate, but his questioning is cut short when the guards laugh uncontrollably after Pilate mentions the name of his friend, Biggus Dickus, and his wife, Incontinentia Buttocks.

After escaping from the Romans, Brian is accidentally scooped up by a passing extraterrestrial spaceship that crash-lands back on Earth. He tries to blend in among prophets who are preaching in a busy plaza, repeating fragments of Jesus' sermons. He stops his sermon mid-sentence when some Roman soldiers depart, leaving his small but intrigued audience demanding to know more. Brian grows frantic when people chase him to the mountains, and there they declare him to be the Messiah.

After spending the night with Judith, Brian discovers an enormous crowd of followers assembled outside his mother's house. Her attempts at dispersing the crowd are rebuffed. Although Brian tells them they need to think for themselves and that they are all individuals, they ironically parrot his words as doctrine. The PFJ seeks to exploit Brian's celebrity status by having him minister to a thronging crowd of followers demanding miracle cures. Brian sneaks out the back, only to be captured by the Romans and sentenced to crucifixion.

In celebration of Passover, a crowd has assembled outside the palace of Pilate, who offers to pardon a prisoner of their choice as a show of friendship between the Romans and the people of Judea. However, the crowd shouts out names containing the letter "r" to mock Pilate's speech impediment, and are further amused by his friend Biggus's lisp, which causes them to laugh uncontrollably. Eventually, Judith appears in the crowd, who frantically calls for the release of Brian, which the crowd (assuming it is another joke) parrots. Realising that one of the prisoners is really named Brian, Pilate agrees to "welease Bwian".

The guards eventually catch up to Brian, who is already on the cross. But in a scene that parodies the climax of the film Spartacus, various crucified people all claim to be Brian, and the wrong man is freed. Brian is successively approached and then abandoned by the PFJ, who praise his martyrdom; the Judean People's Front, who commit mass suicide as a form of political protest; Judith; and his mother. As Brian sinks to despair, the convict beside him offers a cheerful song ("Always Look on the Bright Side of Life"), and Brian and the other convicts join in.

== Cast ==
- Graham Chapman as Brian Cohen (of Nazareth), Biggus Dickus, second wise man
- Sue Jones-Davies as Judith Iscariot
- John Cleese as Reg, High priest, Centurion of the Yard, Deadly Dirk, Arthur, first wise man
- Terry Gilliam as Another person further forward (at Mount – "Do you hear that? 'Blessed are the Greek'!"), Revolutionary, Blood and Thunder prophet, Geoffrey, Gaoler, Audience Member, Frank, Crucifee
- Eric Idle as Mr Cheeky, Stan/Loretta, Harry the Haggler, Culprit woman who casts first stone, Warris, Intensely dull youth, Otto, Gaoler's assistant, Mr Frisbee III
- Terry Jones as Mandy Cohen (Brian's mother), Colin, Simon the Holy Man, Bob Hoskins, Saintly passer-by, Alarmed Crucifixion Assistant
- Michael Palin as Mr Big-Nose, Francis, Mrs A, Culprit woman who casts second stone, Ex-leper, Announcer, Ben, Pontius Pilate, Boring Prophet, Eddie, Shoe Follower, Nisus Wettus, 3rd wise man
- Terence Bayler as Mr Gregory, second Centurion, Dennis
- Carol Cleveland as Mrs Gregory, Woman #1, Elsie
- Charles McKeown as False Prophet, Blind Man, Giggling Guard, Stig, Man #1
- Kenneth Colley as Jesus
- Neil Innes as A Weedy Samaritan
- John Young as Matthias
- Gwen Taylor as Mrs Big-Nose, Woman with ill donkey, Female heckler
- Chris Langham as Alfonso, Giggling Guard
- Andrew MacLachlan as Another Official Stoners Helper, Giggling Guard
- Bernard McKenna as Parvus, Official Stoners Helper, Giggling Guard, Sergeant
- George Harrison as Mr Papadopoulos
- Charles Knode as Passer-by (uncredited)

Several characters remained unnamed during the film but do have names that are used in the soundtrack album track listing and elsewhere. There is no mention in the film that Eric Idle's ever-cheerful joker is called "Mr Cheeky", or that the Roman guard played by Michael Palin is named "Nisus Wettus".

Spike Milligan appears as a prophet, ignored because his acolytes are chasing after Brian. By coincidence Milligan was visiting his old World War II battlefields in Tunisia where the film was being made. The Pythons were alerted to this and he was included in the scene being filmed that morning. He left in the afternoon before he could be included in any of the close-up or publicity shots for the film.

== Production ==
=== Pre-production ===
There are various stories about the origins of Life of Brian. Shortly after the release of Monty Python and the Holy Grail (1975), Eric Idle flippantly suggested that the title of the Pythons' forthcoming feature would be Jesus Christ: Lust for Glory (a play on the UK title for the 1970 American film Patton, Patton: Ordeal and Triumph). This was after he had become frustrated at repeatedly being asked what it would be called, despite the troupe not having given the matter of a third film any consideration. However, they shared a distrust of organised religion, and, after witnessing the critically acclaimed Holy Grail's enormous financial turnover, confirming an appetite among the fans for more cinematic endeavours, they began to seriously consider a film lampooning the New Testament era in the same way that Holy Grail had lampooned Arthurian legend. All they needed was an idea for a plot. Eric Idle and Terry Gilliam, while promoting Holy Grail in Amsterdam, had come up with a sketch in which Jesus' cross is falling apart because of the idiotic carpenters who built it and he angrily tells them how to do it correctly. However, after an early brainstorming stage, and despite being non-believers, they agreed that Jesus was "definitely a good guy" and found nothing to mock in his actual teachings: "He's not particularly funny, what he's saying isn't mockable, it's very decent stuff", said Idle later. After settling on the name Brian for their new protagonist, one idea considered was that of "the 13th disciple". The focus eventually shifted to a separate individual born at a similar time and location who would be mistaken for the Messiah, but had no desire to be followed as such.

The first draft of the screenplay, provisionally titled The Gospel According to St. Brian, was ready by Christmas 1976. The final pre-production draft was ready in January 1978, following "a concentrated two-week writing and water-skiing period in Barbados".

Finance originally came from EMI Films under Michael Deeley and Barry Spikings - EMI had distributed Holy Grail. However the head of EMI, Bernard Delfont, was scared off at the last minute by the subject matter and pulled finance. Python fan and former Beatle George Harrison set up HandMade Films along with Denis O'Brien to help fund the film at a cost of £3 million. Harrison put up the money for it as he "wanted to see the movie"—later described by Terry Jones as the "world's most expensive cinema ticket". The very last words in the film are: "I said to him, 'Bernie, they'll never make their money back on this one'", teasing Delfont for his lack of faith in the project. Terry Gilliam later said, "They pulled out on the Thursday. The crew was supposed to be leaving on the Saturday. Disastrous. It was because they read the script ... finally."

As a reward for his help, Harrison appears in a cameo appearance as Mr. Papadopoulos, "owner of the Mount", who briefly shakes hands with Brian in a crowd scene (at 1:08:50 in the film). His one word of dialogue (a cheery but out of place Scouse "'ullo") had to be dubbed in later by Michael Palin.

=== Filming ===
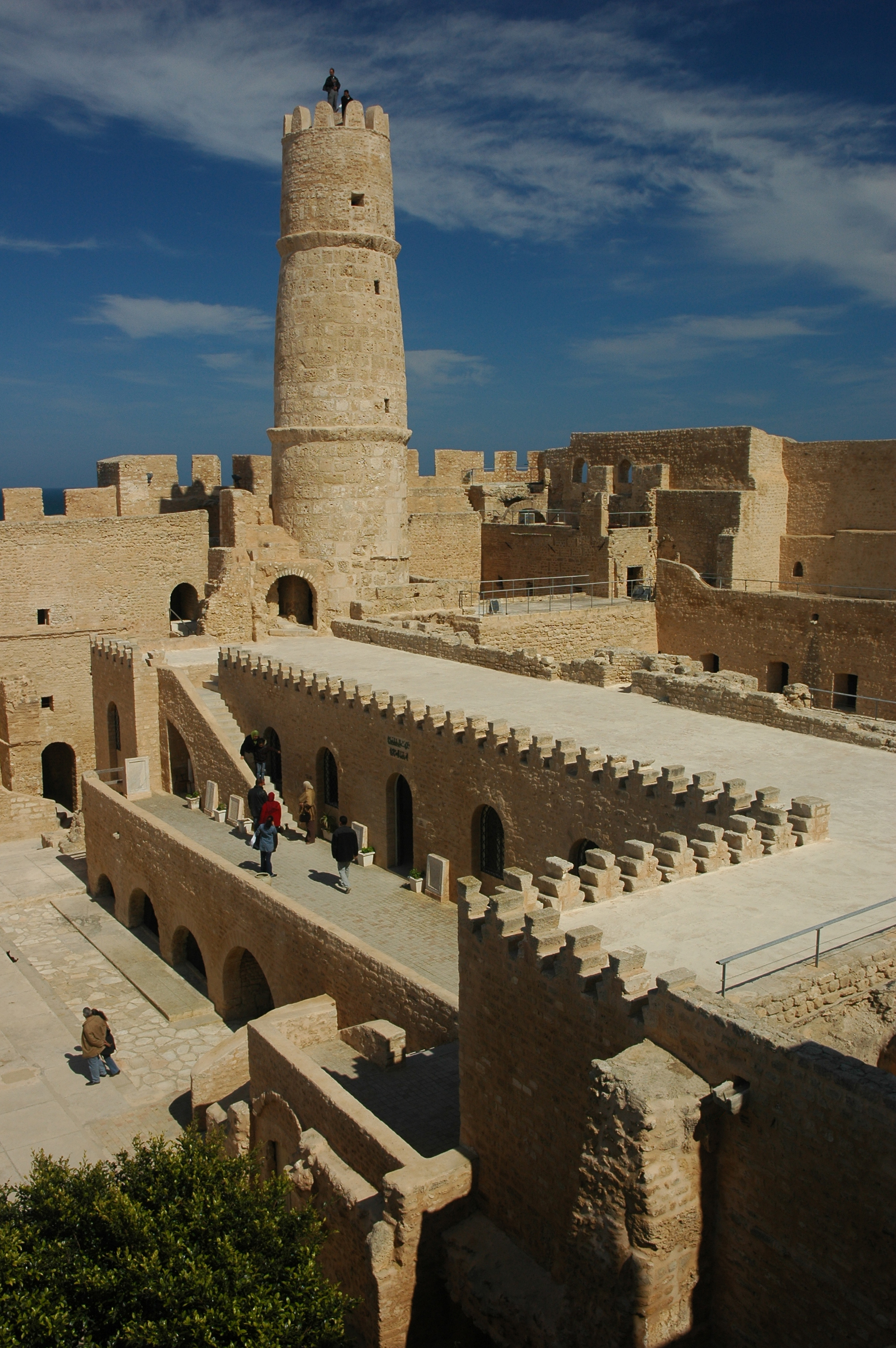
Ribat of Monastir, Tunisia. According to Michael Palin, the first scene filmed was the stoning scene along the outside wall.

Terry Jones was solely responsible for directing, having amicably agreed with Gilliam (who co-directed Holy Grail) to do so, with Gilliam concentrating on the look of the film. Holy Grail's production had often been stilted by their differences behind the camera. Gilliam again contributed two animated sequences (one being the opening credits) and took charge of set design. However, this did not put an absolute end to their feuding. On the DVD commentary, Gilliam expresses pride in one set in particular, the main hall of Pilate's fortress, which had been designed so that it looked like an ancient synagogue that the Romans had converted by dumping their structural artefacts (such as marble floors and columns) on top. He reveals his consternation at Jones for not paying enough attention to it in the cinematography. Gilliam also worked on the matte paintings, useful in particular for the very first shot of the three wise men against a star-scape and in giving the illusion of the whole of the outside of the fortress being covered in graffiti. Perhaps the most significant contribution from Gilliam was the scene in which Brian accidentally leaps off a high building and lands inside a starship about to engage in an interstellar war. This was done "in camera" using a hand-built model starship and miniature pyrotechnics. Gilliam recounted in an interview: "Well, we didn't know what to do with Brian. He got himself to the top of the tower and we had to rescue him somehow, so I said, 'OK, spaceship for that.' That was purely it. It was funny, because this was at the time when Star Wars had just come out."

The film was shot on location in Monastir, Tunisia, which allowed the production to reuse sets from Franco Zeffirelli's Jesus of Nazareth (1977). The Tunisian shoot was documented by Iain Johnstone for his BBC film The Pythons. Many locals were employed as extras on Life of Brian. Director Jones noted, "They were all very knowing because they'd all worked for Franco Zeffirelli on Jesus of Nazareth, so I had these elderly Tunisians telling me, 'Well, Mr Zeffirelli wouldn't have done it like that, you know.'" Further location shooting also took place in Tunisia, at Sousse (Jerusalem outer walls and gateway), Carthage (Roman theatre) and Matmata (Sermon on the Mount and Crucifixion).

Graham Chapman, suffering from alcoholism, was so determined to play the lead role—at one point coveted by Cleese—that he sobered up in time for filming, so much so that he also acted as the on-set doctor.

=== Rough cut and pre-screenings ===
Following shooting between 16 September and 12 November 1978, a two-hour rough cut of the film was put together for its first private showing in January 1979. Over the next few months Life of Brian was re-edited and re-screened a number of times for different preview audiences, losing a number of entire filmed sequences.

=== Editing ===
A number of scenes were cut during the editing process. Five deleted scenes, a total of 13 minutes, including the controversial "Otto", were first made available in 1997 on the Criterion Collection LaserDisc. An unknown amount of raw footage was destroyed in 1998 by the company that bought Handmade Films. However, a number of them (of varying quality) were shown the following year on the Paramount Comedy Channel in the UK. The scenes shown included three shepherds discussing sheep and completely missing the arrival of the angel heralding Jesus's birth, which would have been at the very start of the film; a segment showing the attempted kidnap of Pilate's wife (a large woman played by John Case) whose escape results in a fistfight; a scene introducing hardline Zionist Otto, leader of the Judean People's Front (played by Eric Idle), and his men who practise a suicide run in the courtyard; and a brief scene in which Judith releases some birds into the air in an attempt to summon help. The shepherds' scene has badly distorted sound, and the kidnap scene has poor colour quality. The same scenes that were on the Criterion LaserDisc can now be found on the Criterion Collection DVD.

The most controversial cuts were the scenes involving Otto, an extremist Zionist leader, initially a recurring character, who had a thin Adolf Hitler moustache and spoke with a German accent. Otto would shout accusations of "racial impurity" at Judeans who were conceived (as Brian was) when their mothers were raped by Roman centurions, as well as other Nazi phrases. The logo of the Judean People's Front, designed by Terry Gilliam, was a Star of David with a small line added to each point so it resembled a swastika, most familiar in the West as the symbol of the anti-Semitic Nazi movement. The rest of this faction also all had the same thin moustaches, and wore a spike on their helmets, similar to those on Imperial German helmets. The official reason for the cutting was that Otto's dialogue slowed down the narrative. However, Gilliam, writing in The Pythons Autobiography by The Pythons, said he thought it should have stayed, saying "Listen, we've alienated the Christians, let's get the Jews now." Idle himself was said to have been uncomfortable with the character; "It's essentially a pretty savage attack on rabid Zionism, suggesting it's rather akin to Nazism, which is a bit strong to take, but certainly a point of view." Michael Palin's personal journal entries from the period when various edits of Brian were being test-screened consistently reference the Pythons' and filmmakers' concerns that the Otto scenes were slowing the story down and thus were top of the list to be chopped from the final cut of the film. However, Oxford Brookes University historian David Nash says the removal of the scene represented "a form of self-censorship" and the Otto sequence "which involved a character representative of extreme forms of Zionism" was cut "in the interests of smoothing the way for the film's distribution in America."

The only scene with Otto that remains in the film is during the crucifixion sequence. Otto arrives with his "crack suicide squad", sending the Roman soldiers fleeing in terror. Instead of doing anything useful, the squad stab themselves to death as Brian watches. Terry Jones once mentioned that the only reason this excerpt was not cut too was due to continuity reasons, as their dead bodies were very prominently placed throughout the rest of the scene. He acknowledged that some of the humour of this sole remaining contribution was lost through the earlier edits, but felt they were necessary to the overall pacing.

Otto's scenes, and those with Pilate's wife, were cut from the film after the script had gone to the publishers, and so they can be found in the published version of the script. Also present is a scene where, after Brian has led the Fifth Legion to the headquarters of the People's Front of Judea, Reg (John Cleese) says "You cunt!! You stupid, bird-brained, flat-headed..." The profanity was overdubbed to "you klutz" before the film was released. Cleese approved of this editing as he felt the reaction to the profanity would "get in the way of the comedy."

An early listing of the sequence of sketches reprinted in Monty Python: The Case Against by Robert Hewison reveals that the film was to have begun with a set of sketches at an English public school. Much of this material was first printed in the Monty Python's The Life of Brian / Monty Python Scrapbook that accompanied the original script publication of The Life of Brian and then subsequently reused. The song "All Things Dull and Ugly" and the parody scripture reading "Martyrdom of St. Victor" were performed on Monty Python's Contractual Obligation Album (1980). The idea of a violent rugby match between school masters and small boys was filmed in Monty Python's The Meaning of Life (1983). A sketch about a boy who dies at school appeared on the unreleased The Hastily Cobbled Together for a Fast Buck Album (1981).

== Soundtrack ==
An album was also released by Monty Python in 1979 in conjunction with the film. In addition to the "Brian Song" and "Always Look on the Bright Side of Life", it contains scenes from the film with brief linking sections performed by Eric Idle and Graham Chapman. The album opens with a brief rendition of "Hava Nagila" on Scottish bagpipes. A CD version was released in 1997.

An album of the songs sung in Monty Python's Life of Brian was released on the Disky label. "Always Look on the Bright Side of Life" was later re-released with great success, after being sung by British football fans. Its popularity became truly evident in 1982 during the Falklands War when sailors aboard the destroyer HMS Sheffield, severely damaged in an Argentinean Exocet missile attack on 4 May, started singing it while awaiting rescue. Many people have come to see the song as a life-affirming ode to optimism. One of its more famous renditions was by the dignitaries of Manchester's bid to host the 2000 Olympic Games, just after they were awarded to Sydney. Idle later performed the song as part of the 2012 Summer Olympics closing ceremony. "Always Look on the Bright Side of Life" is also featured in Eric Idle's Spamalot, a Broadway musical based upon Monty Python and the Holy Grail, and was sung by the rest of the Monty Python group at Graham Chapman's memorial service and at the Monty Python Live at Aspen special. The song is a staple at Iron Maiden concerts, where the recording is played after the final encore.

== Release ==
For the original British and Australian releases, a spoof travelogue narrated by John Cleese, Away from It All, was shown before the film itself. It consisted mostly of stock travelogue footage and featured arch comments from Cleese. For instance, a shot of Bulgarian girls in ceremonial dresses was accompanied by the comment "Hard to believe, isn't it, that these simple happy folk are dedicated to the destruction of Western civilisation as we know it!", Communist Bulgaria being a member of the Warsaw Pact at the time. Not only was this a spoof of travelogues per se, it was a protest against the then common practice in Britain of showing cheaply made banal short features before a main feature.

Life of Brian opened on 17 August 1979 in five North American theatres and grossed US$140,034 ($28,007 per screen) in its opening weekend. Its total gross was $19,398,164. It was the highest grossing British film in North America that year.

Released on 8 November 1979 at the Plaza Theatre in London, the film became the fifth highest-grossing film in the United Kingdom in 1979. It opened at number one in London, grossing a house record £40,470 in its opening week, beating the record set by Jaws three years previously by almost £9,000. It remained number one in London for six weeks, grossing £216,355 at the Plaza and expanding to the Ritz in its sixth week, setting a house record £16,991 there, and giving it a higher gross in its sixth week (£46,329) than in its first.

On 30 April 2004, Life of Brian was re-released on five North American screens to "cash in" (as Terry Jones put it) on the box office success of Mel Gibson's The Passion of the Christ. It grossed $26,376 ($5,275 per screen) in its opening weekend. It ran until October 2004, playing at 28 screens at its widest point, eventually grossing $646,124 during its re-release. By comparison, a re-release of Monty Python and the Holy Grail had earned $1.8 million three years earlier. A DVD of the film was also released that year.

== Reception ==
Reviews from critics were mostly positive on the film's release. Movie historian Leonard Maltin reported that "This will probably offend every creed and denomination equally, but it shouldn't. The funniest and most sustained feature from Britain's bad boys." Vincent Canby of The New York Times called the film "the foulest-spoken biblical epic ever made, as well as the best-humored—a nonstop orgy of assaults, not on anyone's virtue, but on the funny bone. It makes no difference that some of the routines fall flat because there are always others coming along immediately after that succeed." Roger Ebert gave the film three stars out of four, writing, "What's endearing about the Pythons is their good cheer, their irreverence, their willingness to allow comic situations to develop through a gradual accumulation of small insanities." Gene Siskel of the Chicago Tribune gave the film three and a half stars, calling it "a gentle but very funny parody of the life of Jesus, as well as of biblical movies." Kevin Thomas of the Los Angeles Times declared, "Even those of us who find Monty Python too hit-and-miss and gory must admit that its latest effort has numerous moments of hilarity." Clyde Jeavons of The Monthly Film Bulletin wrote that the script was "occasionally over-raucous and crude", but found the second half of the film "cumulatively hilarious", with "a splendidly tasteless finale, which even Mel Brooks might envy." Richard Grenier, writing in the neoconservative magazine Commentary, said "Life of Brian contains appreciably more mocking of faddish radicalism and Third World 'national-liberation movements' than it does of religion," citing numerous examples in the film of satire at the expense of "left-wing ideas about imperialism, feminism, and terrorism," reflecting a satirical omnivorousness that Grenier associated with "the tradition of what might be called 'Tory wit,' reaching back to Congreve and Swift and all the way forward to Evelyn Waugh and Kingsley Amis." Gary Arnold of The Washington Post had a negative opinion of the film, writing that it was "a cruel fiction to foster the delusion that 'Brian' is bristling with blasphemous nifties and throbbing with impious wit. If only it were! One might find it easier to keep from nodding off."

"Despite the numerous Biblical references, the film is not about Christ, but a nearly-messiah named Brian whose misfortune sees him worshipped by three wise but lost men, accrue disciples, and ultimately crucified for his efforts at pursuing a simple life. Funded by ex-Beatle George Harrison, and fiercely lobbied against on its release, this film has secured a place in cinematic history."

— Channel 4 entry for Life of Brian which ranked first on their list of the 50 Greatest Comedy Films.

Over time, Life of Brian has regularly been cited as a significant contender for the title "greatest comedy film of all time", and has been named as such in polls conducted by Total Film magazine in 2000, the British TV network Channel 4 where it topped the poll in the 50 Greatest Comedy Films, and The Guardian in 2007. Rotten Tomatoes lists it as one of the best reviewed comedies, with a 96% approval rating from 73 published reviews, with an average rating of 8.6/10. Its critical consensus reads, "One of the more cutting-edge films of the 1970s, this religious farce from the classic comedy troupe is as poignant as it is funny and satirical." Metacritic, which uses a weighted average, assigned the film a score of 77 out of 100, based on 15 critics, indicating "generally favorable" reviews.

In 1999, the BFI declared Life of Brian to be the 28th best British film of all time. It was the seventh highest ranking comedy on this list (four of the better placed efforts were classic Ealing Films). Another Channel 4 poll in 2001 named it the 23rd greatest film of all time (the only comedy that came higher was Billy Wilder's Some Like It Hot, which was ranked 5th). A 2011 poll by Time Out magazine ranked it as the third greatest comedy film ever made, behind Airplane! and This is Spinal Tap. In 2016, Empire magazine ranked Life of Brian 2nd in their list of the 100 best British films, with only David Lean's Lawrence of Arabia ranking higher.

Various polls have voted the line, "He's not the Messiah, he's a very naughty boy!" (spoken by Brian's mother Mandy to the crowd assembled outside her house), to be the funniest in film history. Other famous lines from the film have featured in polls, such as, "What have the Romans ever done for us?" and "I'm Brian and so's my wife".

=== Controversies ===
==== Initial criticism and blasphemy accusations ====
Richard Webster comments in A Brief History of Blasphemy (1990) that "internalised censorship played a significant role in the handling" of Monty Python's Life of Brian. In his view, "As a satire on religion, this film might well be considered a rather slight production. As blasphemy it was, even in its original version, extremely mild. Yet the film was surrounded from its inception by intense anxiety, in some quarters of the Establishment, about the offence it might cause. As a result it gained a certificate for general release only after some cuts had been made. Perhaps more importantly still, the film was shunned by the BBC and ITV, who declined to show it for fear of offending Christians in the UK. Once again a blasphemy was restrained – or its circulation effectively curtailed – not by the force of law but by the internalisation of this law." On its initial release in the UK, the film was banned by several town councils – some of which had no cinemas within their boundaries, or had not even seen the film. A member of Harrogate council, one of those that banned the film, revealed during a television interview that the council had not seen the film, and had based their opinion on what they had been told by the Nationwide Festival of Light, a grouping with an evangelical Christian base, of which they knew nothing.

In New York (the film's release in the US preceded British distribution), screenings were picketed by both rabbis and nuns ("Nuns with banners!" observed Michael Palin). It was also banned for eight years in Ireland and for a year in Norway (it was marketed in Sweden as "The film that is so funny that it was banned in Norway"). During the film's theatrical run in Finland, a text explaining that the film was a parody of Hollywood historical epics was added to the opening credits.

In the UK, Mary Whitehouse, and other traditionalist Christians, pamphleteered and picketed locations where the local cinema was screening the film, a campaign that was felt to have boosted publicity. Leaflets arguing against the film's representation of the New Testament (for example, suggesting that the Wise Men would not have approached the wrong stable as they do in the opening of the film) were documented in Robert Hewison's book Monty Python: The Case Against.

==== Crucifixion issue ====
One of the most controversial scenes was the film's ending: Brian's crucifixion. Many Christian protesters said that it was mocking Jesus' suffering by turning it into a "Jolly Boys Outing" (such as when Mr Cheeky turns to Brian and says: "See, not so bad once you're up!"), capped by Brian's fellow sufferers suddenly bursting into song. This is reinforced by the fact that several characters throughout the film claim crucifixion is not as bad as it seems. For example, when Brian asks his cellmate in prison what will happen to him, he replies: "Oh, you'll probably get away with crucifixion". In another example, Matthias, an old man who works with the People's Front of Judea, dismisses crucifixion as "a doddle" and says being stabbed would be worse.

The director, Terry Jones, issued the following response to this criticism: "Any religion that makes a form of torture into an icon that they worship seems to me a pretty sick sort of religion quite honestly." The Pythons also pointed out that crucifixion was a standard form of execution in ancient times and not just one especially reserved for Jesus.

==== Responses from the cast ====
Shortly after the film was released, Cleese and Palin engaged in a debate on the BBC2 discussion programme Friday Night, Saturday Morning with Malcolm Muggeridge and Mervyn Stockwood, the Bishop of Southwark, who put forward arguments against the film. Muggeridge and Stockwood, it was later claimed, had arrived 15 minutes late to see a screening of the picture prior to the debate, missing the establishing scenes demonstrating that Brian and Jesus were two different characters, and hence contended that it was a send-up of Christ himself. Both Pythons later felt that there had been a strange role reversal in the manner of the debate, with two young upstart comedians attempting to make serious, well-researched points, while the Establishment figures engaged in cheap jibes and point scoring. They also expressed disappointment in Muggeridge, whom all in Python had previously respected as a satirist (he had recently converted to Christianity after meeting Mother Teresa and experiencing what he described as a miracle). Cleese stated that his reputation had "plummeted" in his eyes, while Palin commented, "He was just being Muggeridge, preferring to have a very strong contrary opinion as opposed to none at all." Muggeridge's verdict on the film was that it was "Such a tenth-rate film that it couldn't possibly destroy anyone's genuine faith." In a 2013 interview on BBC Radio 4, Cleese stated that having recently watched the discussion again he "was astonished, first of all, at how stupid [the two members of the Church] were, and how boring the debate became". He added: "I think the sad thing was that there was absolutely no attempt at a proper discussion – no attempt to find any common ground."

"We always stated Brian wasn't blasphemous, but heretical. It wasn't about what Christ was saying, but about the people who followed Him – the ones who for the next 2,000 years would torture and kill each other because they couldn't agree on what He was saying about peace and love."

— Terry Jones speaking in 2011.

The Pythons unanimously deny that they were ever out to destroy people's faith. On the DVD audio commentary, they contend that the film is heretical because it lampoons the practices of modern organised religion, but that it does not blasphemously lampoon the God that Christians and Jews worship. When Jesus does appear in the film (on the Mount, speaking the Beatitudes), he is played straight (by actor Kenneth Colley) and portrayed with respect. The music and lighting make it clear that there is a genuine aura around him. The comedy begins when members of the crowd mishear his statements of peace, love and tolerance ("I think he said, 'blessed are the cheese makers'"). Importantly, he is distinct from the character of Brian, which is also evident in the scene where an annoying and ungrateful ex-leper pesters Brian for money, while moaning that since Jesus cured him, he has lost his source of income in the begging trade (referring to Jesus as a "bloody do-gooder").

James Crossley, however, has argued that the film makes the distinction between Jesus and the character of Brian to make a contrast between the traditional Christ of both faith and cinema and the historical figure of Jesus in critical scholarship and how critical scholars have argued that ideas later got attributed to Jesus by his followers. Crossley points out that the film uses the character of Brian to address a number of potentially controversial scholarly theories about Jesus, such as the Messianic Secret, the Jewishness of Jesus, Jesus the revolutionary, and having a single mother.

In the DVD's audio commentary, Terry Gilliam says, "We were pilloried by religious groups on all sides from Jews to Catholics to Protestants. To me, what's important is that we managed to offend a lot of people. But as you notice, we were very cautious about offending any Muslims. We would say nothing negative about a Muslim, 'cause we'd get a fatwa after us. But your Jews, your Christians, they're easy to push around."

Not all the Pythons agree on the definition of the movie's tone. There was a brief exchange that occurred when the surviving members reunited in Aspen, Colorado, in 1998. In the section where Life of Brian is discussed, the following dialogue ensued:

Jones: "I think the film is heretical, but it's not blasphemous."
Idle: "It's a heresy."
Cleese: "I don't think it's a heresy. It's making fun of the way that people misunderstand the teaching."
Jones: "Of course it's a heresy, John! It's attacking the Church! And that has to be heretical."
Cleese: "No, it's not attacking the Church, necessarily. It's about people who cannot agree with each other."

In a later interview, Jones said the film "isn't blasphemous because it doesn't touch on belief at all. It is heretical, because it touches on dogma and the interpretation of belief, rather than belief itself."

==== 21st century ====
"Life of Brian is an extraordinary tribute to the life and work and teaching of Jesus – that they couldn't actually blaspheme or make a joke out of it. It is a wonderful satire on the way that Jesus's own teaching has been used to persecute others. They were satirising fundamentalism and persecution of others and at the same time saying the one person who rises above all this was Jesus."

— Theologian Richard Burridge.

The film continues to cause controversy; in February 2007, the Church of St Thomas the Martyr in Newcastle upon Tyne held a public screening in the church itself, with song-sheets, organ accompaniment, stewards in costume and false beards for female members of the audience (alluding to an early scene where a group of women disguise themselves as men so that they are able to take part in a stoning). Although the screening was a sell-out, some Christian groups, notably the conservative Christian Voice, were highly critical of the decision to allow the screening to go ahead. Stephen Green, the head of Christian Voice, insisted that "You don't promote Christ to the community by taking the mick out of him." The Reverend Jonathan Adams, one of the church's clergy, defended his taste in comedy, saying that it did not mock Jesus, and that it raised important issues about the hypocrisy and stupidity that can affect religion. Again on the film's DVD commentary, Cleese also spoke up for religious people who have come forward and congratulated him and his colleagues on the film's highlighting of double standards among purported followers of their own faith.

Some bans continued into the 21st century. In 2008, Torbay Council finally permitted the film to be shown after it won an online vote for the English Riviera International Comedy Film Festival. In 2009, it was announced that a thirty-year-old ban of the film in the Welsh town of Aberystwyth had finally been lifted, and the subsequent showing was attended by Terry Jones and Michael Palin alongside mayor Sue Jones-Davies (who portrayed Judith Iscariot in the film). However, before the showing, an Aberystwyth University student discovered that a ban had only been discussed by the council and in fact that it had been shown (or scheduled to be shown) at a cinema in the town in 1981. In 2013, a German official in the state of North Rhine-Westphalia considered the film to be possibly offensive to Christians and hence subject to a local regulation prohibiting its public screening on Good Friday, despite protests by local atheists.

== Political satire ==
The film pokes fun at revolutionary groups and 1970s British left-wing politics. According to Roger Wilmut, "What the film does do is place modern stereotypes in a historical setting, which enables it to indulge in a number of sharp digs, particularly at trade unionists and guerilla organisations". There are several groups in the film which oppose the Roman occupation of Judea, but fall into the familiar pattern of intense competition among factions that appears, to an outsider, to be over ideological distinctions so small as to be invisible, thus portraying the phenomenon of the narcissism of small differences. The comical naming similarities of the groups were also a satire of fractious divisions between contemporary Palestinian liberation groups, all containing the words "front" and "liberation" along with "Palestine": the Palestinian Popular Struggle Front (PPSF) (formed 1967) had broken off from the Popular Front for the Liberation of Palestine (PFLP), which had further divisions which led to the Popular Front for the Liberation of Palestine – General Command (PFLP-GC) (1968), the Democratic Front for the Liberation of Palestine (DFLP) (1969), and the Popular Revolutionary Front for the Liberation of Palestine (PFRLP) (1972).

Such disunity indeed fatally hampered real-life Judean resistance against Roman rule. Michael Palin says that the various separatist movements were modelled on "modern resistance groups, all with obscure acronyms which they can never remember and their conflicting agendas".

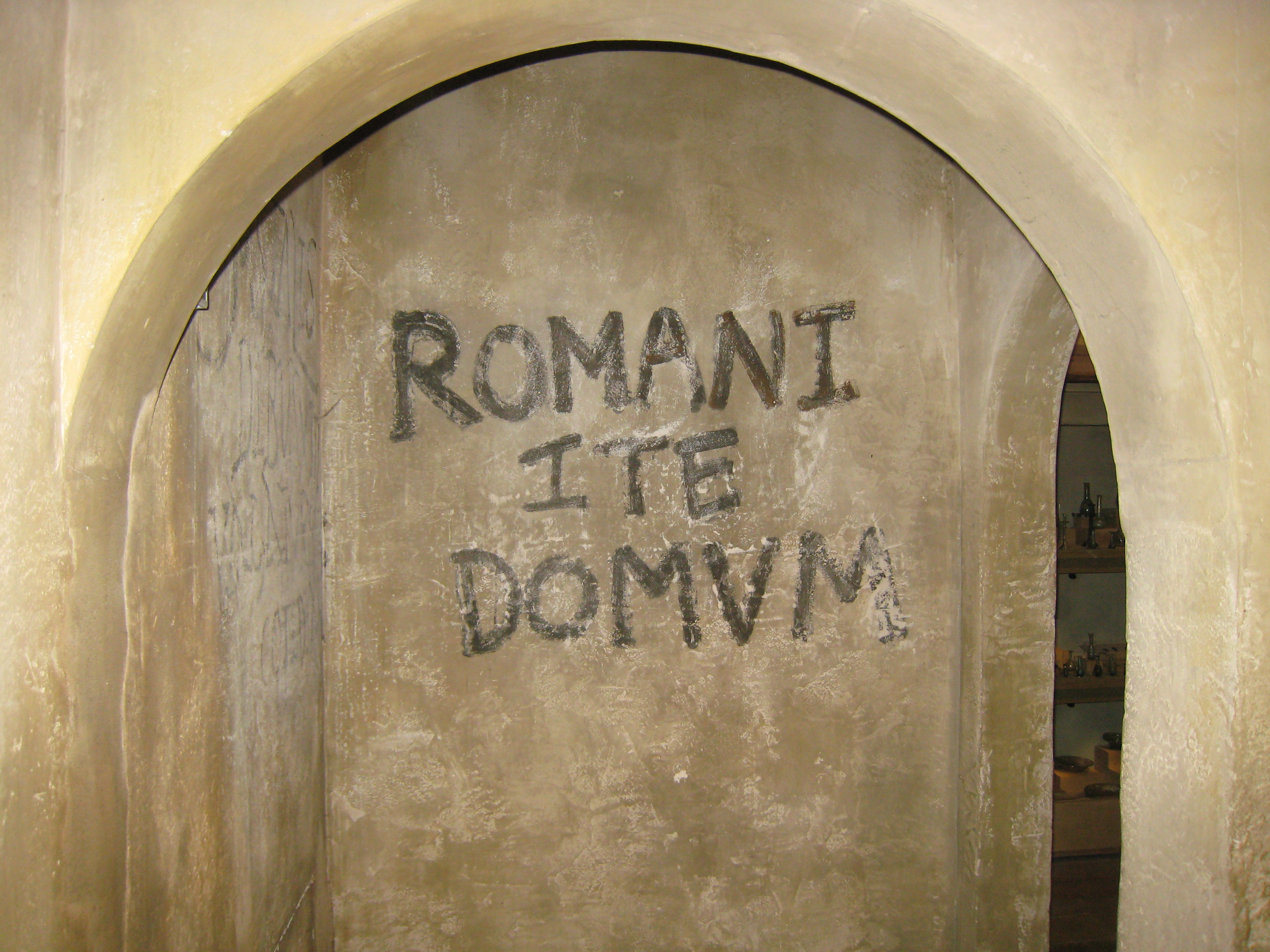
Romani ite domum ("Romans go home"); recreation of the anti-Roman slogan (in the Hull and East Riding Museum) that Brian writes on the walls of the Jerusalem Palace to prove himself worthy to be a member of the People's Front of Judea

The People's Front of Judea, composed of the Pythons' characters, harangue their "rivals" with cries of "splitters" and stand vehemently opposed to the Judean People's Front, the Judean People's Popular Front, the Campaign for a Free Galilee, and the Popular Front of Judea (the last composed of a single old man, mocking the size of real revolutionary Trotskyist factions). The infighting among revolutionary organisations is demonstrated most dramatically when the PFJ attempts to kidnap Pontius Pilate's wife, but encounters agents of the Campaign for a Free Galilee, and the two factions begin a violent brawl over which of them conceived of the plan first. When Brian exhorts them to cease their fighting to struggle "against the common enemy", the revolutionaries stop and cry in unison, "the Judean People's Front!" However, they soon resume their fighting and, with two Roman legionaries watching bemusedly, continue until Brian is left the only survivor, at which point he is captured.

Other scenes have the freedom fighters wasting time in debate, with one of the debated items being that they should not waste their time debating so much. The famous "what have the Romans ever done for us" scene has drawn significant attention, with Python biographer George Perry noting, "The People's Liberation Front of Judea conducts its meetings as though they have been convened by a group of shop stewards". This joke is the reverse of a similar conversation recorded in the Babylonian Talmud; some authors have even suggested the joke is based on the Talmudic text.

== Film analysis ==
=== Themes and motifs ===
==== Bible ====
The depictions of Jesus in two short scenes at the start of the film are strongly based on Christian iconography. The resistance fighters leave the Sermon on the Mount, which was a literal recital, angry because Jesus was too pacifistic for them. ("Well, blessed is just about everyone with a vested interest in the status quo…") In addition to the respectful depiction of Jesus, the film does not state that there is no God or that Jesus is not the son of God. The appearance of a leper, who says he was healed by Jesus, is in line with the Gospels and their reports about Jesus performing miracles.

Any direct reference to Jesus disappears after the introductory scenes, yet his life story partially acts as a framework and subtext for the story of Brian. Brian being a bastard of a Roman centurion could refer to the polemic legend that Jesus was the son of the Roman soldier Panthera. Disguised as a prophet, Brian talks about "the lilies on the field" and states more clearly, "Don't pass judgment on other people or else you might get judged yourself": Brian incoherently repeats statements he heard from Jesus.

Another significant figure in the film who is named in the Gospels is Pontius Pilate, the central antagonist. Although the humour largely involves Jews, there is no sinister Jew to compare with Judas or Caiaphas. An anti-Semitic interpretation of the story is therefore excluded, according to scholars. The crucifixion scene, a central part of Christian iconography, is viewed from a historical context within the narrative style of the film. It is a historically accurate enactment of a routinely done mass crucifixion.

==== Belief and dogmatism ====
The intended subject of the satire was not Jesus and his teachings but religious dogmatism, according to film theorists and statements from Monty Python. This is made clear in the beginning of the film during the Sermon on the Mount. Not only do the poor acoustics make it more difficult to hear what Jesus says, but the audience fails to interpret what was said correctly and sensibly. When Jesus said, "blessed are the peacemakers", the audience understands the phonetically similar word "Cheesemakers" and in turn interpret it as a metaphor and beatification of those who produce dairy products.

Life of Brian satirises, in the words of David Hume, the "strong propensity of mankind to [believe in] the extraordinary and the marvellous". When Brian cuts his sermon short and turns away from the crowd, they mistake his behaviour as not wanting to share the secret to eternal life and follow him everywhere. In their need to submit to an authority, the crowd declares him first a prophet and eventually a messiah. Even when Brian explicitly denies he is the Messiah, they still follow him, rationalizing that only the true Messiah would have the humility to deny his own divine status. The faithful gather beneath Brian's window en masse to receive God's blessing. This is when Brian utters the main message of the film "you don't need to follow anybody! You've got to think for yourselves!" Monty Python saw this central message of the satire confirmed with the protests of practising Christians after the film was released.

According to Terry Jones, Life of Brian "is not blasphemy but heresy", because Brian contested the authority of the Church whereas the belief in God remained untouched. He goes on to mention that "Christ [is] saying all of these wonderful things about people living together in peace and love, and then for the next two thousand years people are putting each other to death in His name because they can't agree on how He said it, or in what order He said it." The dispute among the followers about the correct interpretation of a sandal, which Brian lost, is in the words of Terry Jones the "history of the Church in three minutes". Kevin Shilbrack shares the view that you can enjoy the movie and still be religious. For the most part, lost in the religious controversy was the film's mockery of factional dogmatism among left-wing parties. According to John Cleese, an almost unmanageable number of left-wing organisations and parties was formed back then in the United Kingdom. He said that it had been so important to each of them to have one pure doctrine that they would rather fight each other than their political opponent. In the film, rather than presenting a common front as their organisational names should imply, the leader of the People's Front of Judea makes it clear that their hate for the Judean Peoples's Front is greater than their hate for the Romans. They are so caught up in constant debates that the "rather looney bunch of revolutionaries" indirectly accept the occupying forces as well as their execution methods as a fate they all have to endure. So, in the end, even though they have ample opportunity to rescue Brian, they instead leave Brian on the cross, thanking him for his sacrifice.

There is also a sideswipe at the women's movement, which started to draw a lot of attention in the 1970s. In accordance with the language of political activists, resistance fighter Stan wants to exercise "his right as a man" to be a woman. The group accepts him from that moment on as Loretta, because the right to give birth was not theirs to take. Also as a result of that, the term sibling replaces the terms brother or sister.

==== Individuality and meaninglessness ====
Brian: "Look, you've got it all wrong. You don't need to follow me. You don't need to follow anybody. You've got to think for yourselves. You're all individuals."
Crowd in unison: "YES. WE'RE ALL INDIVIDUALS."
Brian: "You're all different."
Crowd in unison: "YES. WE'RE ALL DIFFERENT."
Single person in crowd: "I'm not..."

One of the most commented-upon scenes in the film is when Brian tells his followers that they are all individuals and don't need to follow anybody. According to Edward Slowik, this is a rare moment in which Monty Python puts a philosophical concept into words so openly and directly. Life of Brian accurately depicts the existentialist view that everybody needs to give meaning to their own life.

Brian can thus be called an existentialist following the tradition of Friedrich Nietzsche and Jean-Paul Sartre. He is honest to himself and others and lives as authentic a life as he can. However, Brian is too naïve to be called a hero based on the ideas of Albert Camus. For Camus, the search for the meaning of one's own life takes place in a deeply meaningless and abstruse world. The "absurd hero" rebels against this meaninglessness and at the same time holds on to their goals, although they know their fight leaves no impact in the long run. Contrary to that, Brian isn't able to recognize the meaninglessness of his own situation and therefore can't triumph over it.

In Monty Python and Philosophy, Kevin Shilbrack states that the fundamental view of the film is that the world is absurd, and every life needs to be lived without a greater meaning. He points out that the second-last verse of the song the film finishes on, "Always Look on the Bright Side of Life", expresses this message clearly:

For life is quite absurd
And death's the final word
You must always face the curtain with a bow.
Forget about your sin – give the audience a grin
Enjoy it, it's your last chance anyhow.

Shilbrack concludes that the finale shows that the executions had no purpose since the deaths were meaningless and no better world was waiting for them. On this note, some people would claim that the film presents a nihilistic world view which contradicts any basis of religion. However, Life of Brian offers humour to counterbalance the nihilism, Shilbrack states in his text. He comments that "religion and humour are compatible with each other and you should laugh about the absurdity since you can't fight it."

== Legacy ==
=== Literature ===
Spin-offs include a script-book The Life of Brian of Nazareth, which was printed back-to-back with MONTYPYTHONSCRAPBOOK as a single book. The printing of this book also caused problems, due to rarely used laws in the United Kingdom against blasphemy, dictating what can and cannot be written about religion. The publisher refused to print both halves of the book, and original prints were by two companies.

Julian Doyle, the film's editor, wrote The Life of Brian/Jesus, a book which not only describes the filmmaking and editing process but argues that it is the most accurate Biblical film ever made. In October 2008, a memoir by Kim "Howard" Johnson titled Monty Python's Tunisian Holiday: My Life with Brian was released. Johnson became friendly with the Pythons during the filming of Life of Brian and the book is based on his notes and memories of the behind-the-scenes filming and make-up.

=== Music ===
With the success of Eric Idle's musical retelling of Monty Python and the Holy Grail, called Spamalot, Idle announced that he would be giving Life of Brian a similar treatment. The oratorio, called Not the Messiah (He's a Very Naughty Boy), was commissioned to be part of the festival called Luminato in Toronto in June 2007, and was written/scored by Idle and John Du Prez, who also worked with Idle on Spamalot. Not the Messiah is a spoof of Handel's Messiah. It runs approximately 50 minutes, and was conducted at its world premiere by Toronto Symphony Orchestra music director Peter Oundjian, who is Idle's cousin. Not the Messiah received its US premiere at the Caramoor International Music Festival in Katonah, New York. Oundjian and Idle joined forces once again for a double performance of the oratorio in July 2007.

=== Other media ===
In October 2011, BBC Four premiered the made-for-television comedy film Holy Flying Circus, written by Tony Roche and directed by Owen Harris. The "Pythonesque" film explores the events surrounding the 1979 television debate on talk show Friday Night, Saturday Morning between John Cleese and Michael Palin and Malcolm Muggeridge and Mervyn Stockwood, then Bishop of Southwark.

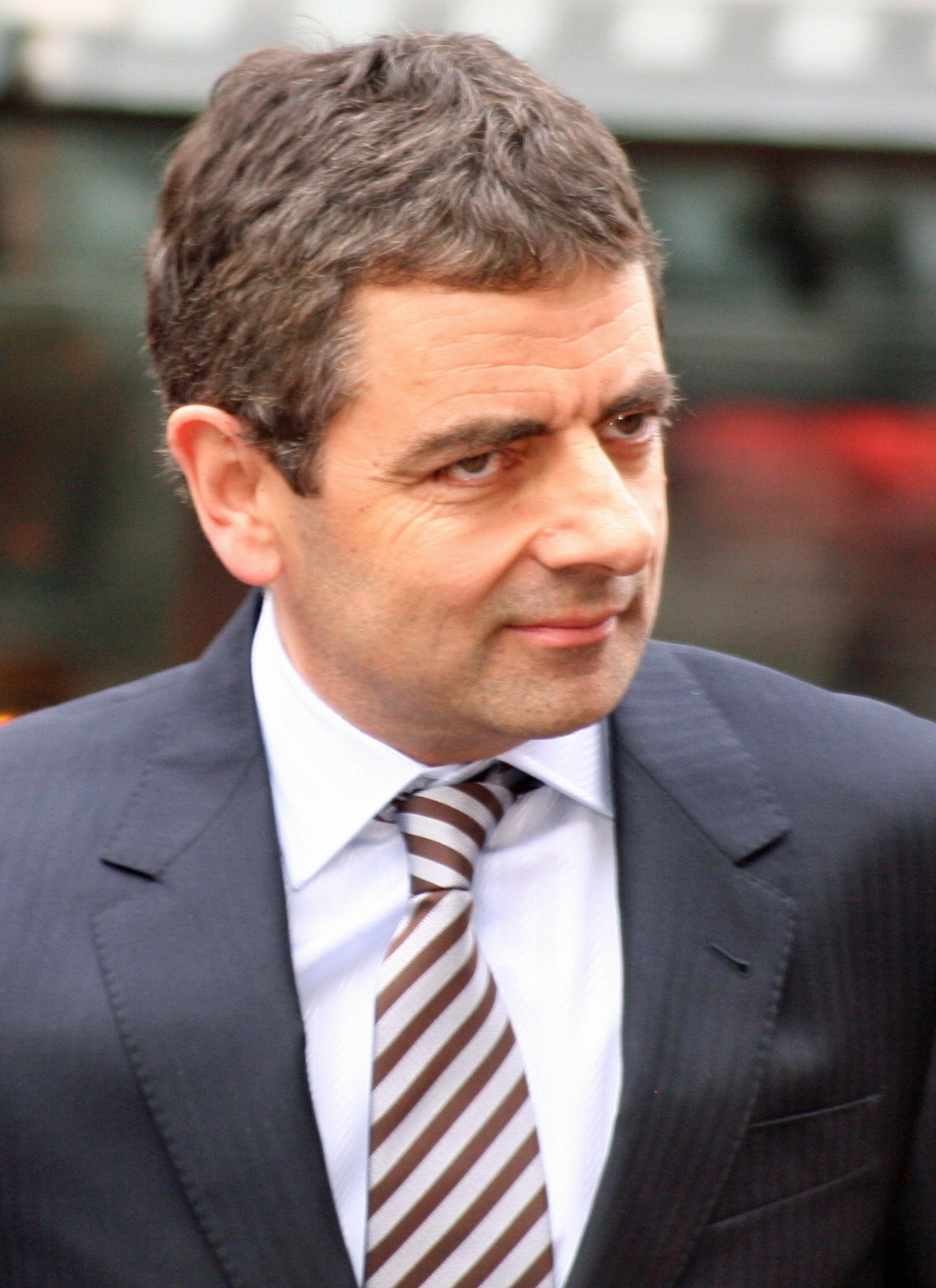
Rowan Atkinson lampooned the pompous behaviour from the bishop Mervyn Stockwood in the TV debate a week later in a sketch on Not the Nine O'Clock News.

In a Not the Nine O'Clock News sketch, a bishop who has directed a scandalous film called The Life of Christ is hauled over the coals by a representative of the "Church of Python", claiming that the film is an attack on "Our Lord, John Cleese" and on the members of Python, who, in the sketch, are the objects of Britain's true religious faith. This was a parody of the infamous Friday Night, Saturday Morning programme, broadcast a week previously. The bishop (played by Rowan Atkinson) claims that the reaction to the film has surprised him, as he "didn't expect the Spanish Inquisition."

Radio host John Williams of Chicago's WGN 720 AM has used "Always Look on the Bright Side of Life" in a segment of his Friday shows. The segment is used to highlight good events from the past week in listeners' lives and what has made them smile. In the 1997 film As Good as It Gets, the misanthropic character played by Jack Nicholson sings "Always Look on the Bright Side of Life" as evidence of the character's change in attitude.

A BBC history series What the Romans Did for Us, written and presented by Adam Hart-Davis and broadcast in 2000, takes its title from Cleese's rhetorical question "What have the Romans ever done for us?" in one of the film's scenes. (Cleese himself parodied this line in a 1986 BBC advert defending the Television Licence Fee: "What has the BBC ever given us?", and in 2026 an updated version was produced, this time fronted by Romesh Ranganathan).

Former British Prime Minister Tony Blair in his Prime Minister's Questions of 3 May 2006 made a shorthand reference to the types of political groups, "Judean People's Front" or "People's Front of Judea", lampooned in Life of Brian. This was in response to a question from the Labour MP David Clelland, asking "What has the Labour government ever done for us?" – itself a parody of John Cleese's "What have the Romans ever done for us?"

On New Year's Day 2007, and again on New Year's Eve, UK television station Channel 4 dedicated an entire evening to the Monty Python phenomenon, during which an hour-long documentary was broadcast called The Secret Life of Brian about the making of The Life of Brian and the controversy that was caused by its release. The Pythons featured in the documentary and reflected upon the events that surrounded the film. This was followed by a screening of the film itself. The documentary (in a slightly extended form) was one of the special features on the 2007 DVD re-release – the "Immaculate Edition", also the first Python release on Blu-ray.

In June 2014, King's College London hosted an academic conference on the film, in which internationally renowned Biblical scholars and historians discussed the film and its reception, looking both at how the Pythons had made use of scholarship and texts, and how the film can be used creatively within modern scholarship on the Historical Jesus. In a panel discussion, including Terry Jones and theologian Richard Burridge, John Cleese described the event as "the most interesting thing to come out of Monty Python". The papers from the conference have gone on to prompt the publication of a book, edited by Joan E. Taylor, the conference organiser, Jesus and Brian: Exploring the Historical Jesus and His Times via Monty Python's Life of Brian, published by Bloomsbury in 2015. Theological Studies Professor Matthew Robert Anderson has drawn on that research to outline the ways that the film is a "historically accurate" depiction of the time period and the historical Jesus.

In 2023, John Cleese said he was working on a stage version of the film. In 2024, he said he expected it to play in London's West End.

In 2025, writing for the New Statesman, George Eaton stated some were drawing comparisons between the recently founded left-wing Your Party with the People's Front of Judea/Judean People's Front dispute, due to the chaotic launch of the party and its ongoing internal conflicts.

In June 2026, during the swearing in of Andy Burnham as Labour MP for Makerfield, an opposition MP shouted "he's not the Messiah", to which Burnham responded "naughty boy", referencing a line in the film.

== See also ==
- BFI Top 100 British films
- List of cult films
- List of films considered the best
- Deux heures moins le quart avant Jésus-Christ
- The Book of Clarence
