= Edward Slowik =

American philosopher

Education
- Education: Ohio State University (PhD), University of Illinois at Chicago (BA)
- Thesis: Newton's ‘De Gravitatione’ Argument: Cartesian Relationalist Dynamics and the Structure of Space and Time (1994)
- Doctoral advisor: Mark Wilson
- Other advisors: Calvin Normore, Ronald Laymon

Philosophical work
- Era: 21st-century philosophy
- Region: Western philosophy
- Institutions: Winona State University

Edward Slowik is an American philosopher and professor of philosophy at the Winona State University. He is known for his work on early modern philosophy.

== Books ==
- The Deep Metaphysics of Space: An Alternative History and Ontology beyond Substantivalism and Relationism. Dordrecht: Springer, October 2016
- Cartesian Spacetime: Descartes' Physics and Relational Theory of Space and Motion. Dordrecht: Kluwer, February 2002
