= List of awards and nominations received by Samantha Morton =

Samantha Morton awards and nominations
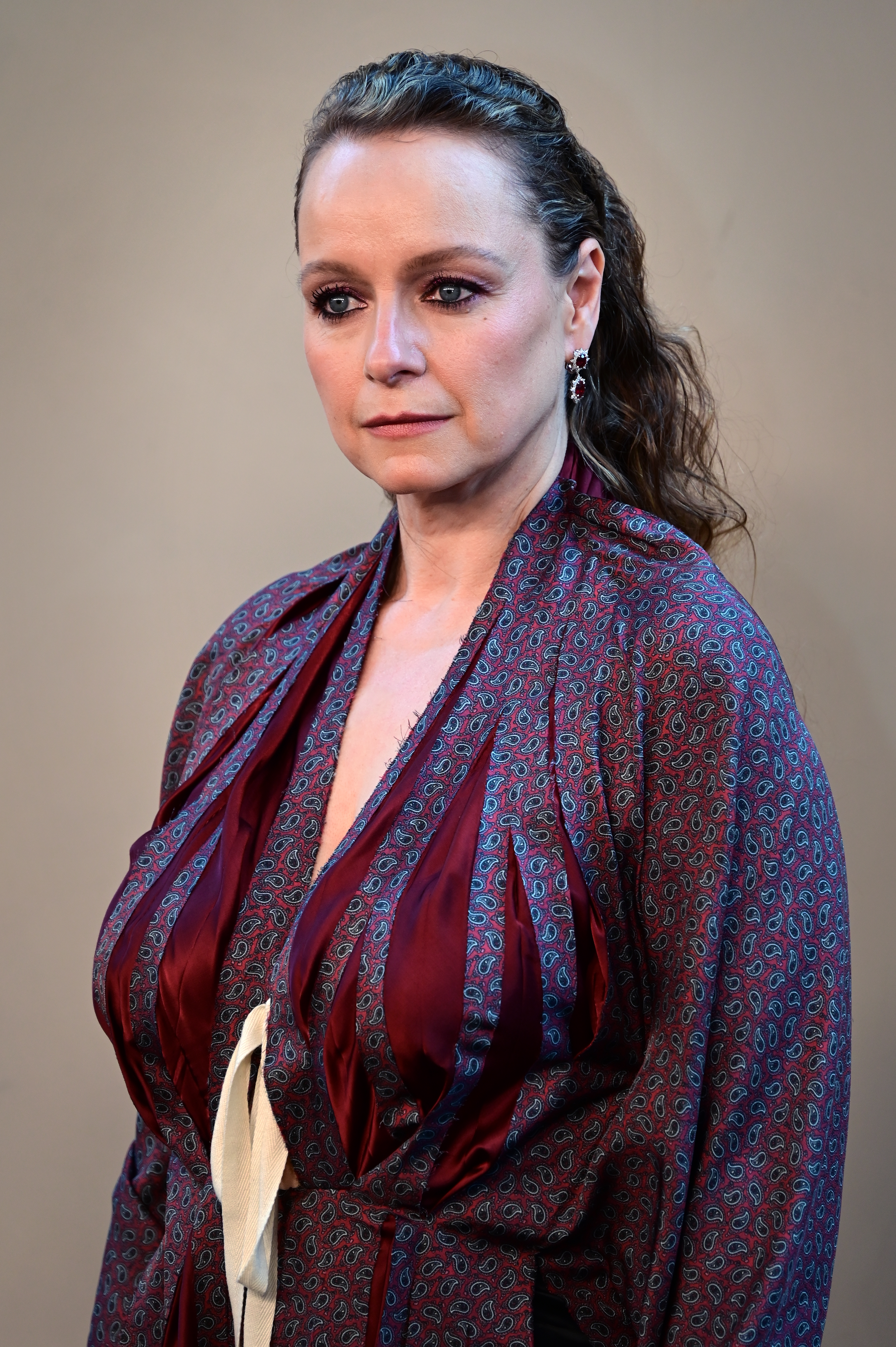
- Morton in 2026
Awards and nominations
Award	Wins	Nominations
Academy Awards	0	2
Actor Awards	0	1
BAFTA Awards	2	5
Critics' Choice Awards	0	3
Emmy Awards	0	1
European Film Awards	0	2
Golden Globe Awards	1	2

Totals (Note: Certain award groups do not simply award one winner. They acknowledge several different recipients, have runners-up, and have third place. Since this is a specific recognition and is different from losing an award, runner-up mentions are considered wins in this award tally. For simplification and to avoid errors, each award in this list has been presumed to have had a prior nomination.)
- Wins: 27
- Nominations: 70

The following is a list of awards and nominations received by English actress and musician Samantha Morton. Known for her work in independent films, her accolades include a Golden Globe Award and a BAFTA TV Award, in addition to a BAFTA Fellowship and nominations for two Academy Awards, an Actor Award, and a Primetime Emmy Award.

In 2000, Morton received a nomination for the Academy Award for Best Supporting Actress for her performance as a mute laundress in Woody Allen's comedy-drama mockumentary Sweet and Lowdown (1999). Four years later, she received a nomination for the Academy Award for Best Actress for her performance as the mother of a immigrant Irish family in In America (2002), as well as a nomination for the Actor Award for Outstanding Performance by a Cast in a Motion Picture along with the film's ensemble. Morton's performances as writer Deborah Curtis in Control (2007) and as a widow in The Messenger (2009) also earned praise, and earned her nominations for the BAFTA Award for Best Actress in a Supporting Role and the Critics' Choice Movie Award for Best Supporting Actress respectively.

For television, Morton won the Golden Globe Award for Best Supporting Actress – Series, Miniseries or Television Film and was nominated for the Primetime Emmy Award for Outstanding Supporting Actress in a Limited or Anthology Series or Movie and the BAFTA TV Award for Best Actress for her performance as Myra Hindley in Longford (2006). Morton made her directorial debut with the television film The Unloved (2009), for which she won the BAFTA TV Award for Best Single Drama. She was honored with the BAFTA Fellowship in 2024.

== Major associations ==
=== Academy Awards ===
Year	Category	Nominated work	Result	Ref.
2000	Best Supporting Actress	Sweet and Lowdown	Nominated	
2004	Best Actress	In America	Nominated	

=== Actor Awards ===
Year	Category	Nominated work	Result	Ref.
2004	Outstanding Cast in a Motion Picture	In America	Nominated (Note: Shared with the cast of In America)	

=== BAFTA Awards ===
Year	Category	Nominated work	Result	Ref.
British Academy Film Awards
2008	Best Actress in a Supporting Role	Control	Nominated	
2024	BAFTA Fellowship	—N/a	Honored	
British Academy Television Awards
2007	Best Actress	Longford	Nominated	
2010	Best Single Drama	The Unloved	Won (Note: Shared with Tony Grisoni, Kate Ogborn, & Andrew Eaton)	
2020	Best Actress	I Am Kirsty	Nominated	

=== Critics' Choice Awards ===
Year	Category	Nominated work	Result	Ref.
Critics' Choice Movie Awards
2004	Best Actress	In America	Nominated	
2010	Best Supporting Actress	The Messenger	Nominated	
Critics' Choice Super Awards
2021	Best Villain in a Series	The Walking Dead	Nominated	

=== Emmy Awards ===
Year	Category	Nominated work	Result	Ref.
Primetime Emmy Awards
2007	Outstanding Supporting Actress in a Limited or Anthology Series or Movie	Longford	Nominated	

=== European Film Awards ===
Year	Category	Nominated work	Result	Ref.
2002	European Actress	Morvern Callar	Nominated	
2004	People's Choice Award for Best Actress	Code 46	Nominated	

=== Golden Globe Awards ===
Year	Category	Nominated work	Result	Ref.
2000	Best Supporting Actress - Motion Picture	Sweet and Lowdown	Nominated	
2008	Best Supporting Actress – Series, Miniseries or Television Film	Longford	Won	

== Other awards ==
=== British Independent Film Awards ===
Year	Category	Nominated work	Result	Ref.
1998	Best Actress	Under the Skin	Nominated	
2001	Best Actress	Pandaemonium	Nominated	
2002	Best Actress	Morvern Callar	Won	
2003	Best Actress	In America	Nominated	
2004	Best Supporting Actor/Actress	Enduring Love	Nominated	
2007	Best Supporting Actor/Actress	Control	Nominated	
2008	Best Actress	The Daisy Chain	Nominated	
2009	Douglas Hickox Award	The Unloved	Nominated	
2022	Richard Harris Award	—N/a	Honored	

=== Gotham Awards ===
Year	Category	Nominated work	Result	Ref.
2008	Best Ensemble Cast	Synecdoche, New York	Won (Note: Shared with the cast of Synecdoche, New York) (Note: Tied with Vicky Cristina Barcelona)	

=== Independent Spirit Awards ===
Year	Category	Nominated work	Result	Ref.
2004	Best Female Lead	In America	Nominated	
2009	Robert Altman Award	Synecdoche, New York	Won	
2010	Best Supporting Female	The Messenger	Nominated	

=== Satellite Awards ===
Year	Category	Nominated work	Result	Ref.
2000	Best Actress in a Supporting Role - Musical or Comedy	Sweet and Lowdown	Nominated	
2001	Best Actress in a Supporting Role - Drama	Jesus' Son	Nominated	
2004	Best Actress in a Motion Picture - Drama	In America	Nominated	
2007	Best Actress – Miniseries or Television Film	Longford	Won	

=== Saturn Awards ===
Year	Category	Nominated work	Result	Ref.
2003	Best Supporting Actress	Minority Report	Won	

== Other associations ==
Award	Year	Category	Nominated work	Result	Ref.
Angers European First Film Festival	1998	Best Actress	Under the Skin	Won	
Boston Society of Film Critics	1998	Best Actress	Under the Skin	Won	
Chicago Film Critics Association	2000	Best Supporting Actress	Sweet and Lowdown	Nominated	
Chicago Film Critics Association	2000	Most Promising Actress	Sweet and Lowdown	Nominated	
Chlotrudis Awards	2001	Best Supporting Actress	Sweet and Lowdown	Nominated	
Chlotrudis Awards	2004	Best Actress	Morvern Callar	Nominated	
Empire Awards	2001	Best British Actress	Sweet and Lowdown	Nominated	
Empire Awards	2003	Best British Actress	Minority Report	Won	
Empire Awards	2005	Best British Actress	Enduring Love	Nominated	
Evening Standard British Film Awards	2000	Best Actress	Dreaming of Joseph Lees	Won	
Evening Standard British Film Awards	2008	Best Actress	Control	Nominated	
Evening Standard British Film Awards	2009	Best Actress	Mister Lonely	Nominated	
Evening Standard British Film Awards	2012	Best Actress	The Messenger	Nominated	
Houston Film Critics Society	2009	Best Supporting Actress	The Messenger	Nominated	
IndieWire Critics Poll	2008	Best Supporting Performance	Synecdoche, New York	3rd place	
International Cinephile Society	2008	Best Supporting Actress	Control	Won	
London Film Critics Circle	2001	British Supporting Actress of the Year	Sweet and Lowdown	Won	
London Film Critics Circle	2003	British Actress of the Year	Morvern Callar	Nominated	
London Film Critics Circle	2008	British Actress of the Year	Control	Nominated	
Los Angeles Film Critics Association	2000	Best Supporting Actress	Sweet and Lowdown	Runner-up	
MTV Movie & TV Awards	2004	Best Trans-Atlantic Breakthrough Performer	—N/a	Nominated	
National Society of Film Critics	2000	Best Supporting Actress	Sweet and Lowdown	3rd place	
National Society of Film Critics	2010	Best Supporting Actress	The Messenger	2nd place (Note: Tied with Anna Kendrick for Up in the Air)	
Online Film Critics Society	2003	Best Supporting Actress	Minority Report	Won	
Online Film & Television Association	2003	Best Supporting Actress	Minority Report	Nominated	
Phoenix Film Critics Society	2003	Best Actress in a Supporting Role	Minority Report	Nominated	
San Diego Film Critics Society	2009	Best Supporting Actress	The Messenger	Won	
Seattle International Film Festival	2013	Best Actress	Decoding Annie Parker	Won	
St. Louis Film Critics Association	2009	Best Supporting Actress	The Messenger	Nominated	
Toronto Film Critics Association	2003	Best Actress	Morvern Callar	Won	
Vancouver Film Critics Circle	2013	Best Supporting Actress in a Canadian Film	Cosmopolis	Nominated	
Village Voice Film Poll	2002	Best Performance	Morvern Callar	7th place	
Village Voice Film Poll	2007	Best Supporting Actress	Control	9th place	
Village Voice Film Poll	2009	Best Supporting Actress	The Messenger	4th place	
Washington DC Area Film Critics Association	2009	Best Supporting Actress	The Messenger	Nominated	
Women Film Critics Circle	2025	Best Supporting Actress	Anemone	Runner-up (Note: Shared with Andrea Riseborough for Goodbye June & Odessa A'zion for Marty Supreme)	
