= British Independent Film Awards 1998 =

British awards ceremony

1st British Independent Film Awards
- Awarded for: Best in British independent film
- Date: 29 October 1998
- Site: Café Royal, London
- Hosted by: Keith Allen
- Official website: www.bifa.film

Highlights
- Best Film: My Name is Joe
- Most awards: My Name is Joe (3); Nil by Mouth (3)
- Most nominations: Nil by Mouth (6)

The inaugural British Independent Film Awards (BIFA) were held on 29 October 1998 to recognise the best in British independent cinema and filmmaking talent from United Kingdom.

The awards were the brainchild of Elliot Grove and Suzanne Ballantyne of the Raindance Film Festival, with the aim of celebrating merit and achievement in independently funded British filmmaking, honouring new talent and promoting British films and filmmaking to a wider public audience.

To be eligible for consideration, films needed to have been produced, or majority co-produced by a British company, or in receipt of at least 51% of their budget from a British source. In addition they could not be solely funded by a single studio.

The awards ceremony was held at the Café Royal in London's West End and hosted by Keith Allen. Winners in ten categories were determined from shortlists and a further three were awarded entirely at the jury's discretion. The jury for 1998 included Bobby Allen, Grace Carley, Kay Mellor, Kirk Jones, Lora Fox Gamble, Mark Shivas, Martin Myers, Paul Webster, Steve Kenis, Tim Bevan and Wendy Palmer.

== Winners and nominees ==
Best British Independent Film	Best Director
My Name Is Joe – Ken Loach; Elizabeth – Shekhar Kapur; Lock, Stock and Two Smoking Barrels – Guy Ritchie; Nil by Mouth – Gary Oldman; Twenty Four Seven – Shane Meadows	Ken Loach – My Name Is Joe; Carine Adler – Under The Skin; Gillies MacKinnon – Regeneration; Gary Oldman – Nil by Mouth; Guy Ritchie – Lock, Stock and Two Smoking Barrels
Best Actor	Best Actress
Ray Winstone – Nil by Mouth as Raymond; John Hurt – Love and Death on Long Island as Giles De'Ath; Peter Mullan – My Name Is Joe as Joe Kavanagh; Jonathan Pryce – Regeneration as William Rivers; David Thewlis – Divorcing Jack as Dan Starkey	Kathy Burke – Nil by Mouth as Valerie; Louise Goodall – My Name Is Joe as Sarah Downie; Rachel Griffiths – My Son The Fanatic as Bettina / Sandra; Samantha Morton – Under The Skin as Iris Kelly; Emma Thompson – The Winter Guest as Frances
Most Promising Newcomer	Best Screenplay
Laila Morse – Nil by Mouth as Janet; James Breese – My Funny Valentine (director); Enda Hughes – Flying Saucer Rock 'n' Roll (director); Jim Pilkington – Pocket (director); Simon Rumley – Strong Language (director / writer)	Paul Laverty – My Name Is Joe; Hanif Kureishi – My Son The Fanatic; Peter Mullan – Orphans; Gary Oldman – Nil by Mouth; Guy Ritchie – Lock, Stock and Two Smoking Barrels
Best International Independent Film (English Language)	Best International Independent Film (Foreign Language)
Boogie Nights – Paul Thomas Anderson; Broken Vessels – Scott Ziehl; Chasing Amy – Kevin Smith; Left Luggage – Jeroen Krabbé; The Castle – Rob Sitch	The Apartment – Gilles Mimouni; Airbag – Juanma Bajo Ulloa; Live Flesh – Pedro Almodóvar; Marquise – Véra Belmont; Men with Guns – John Sayles
Douglas Hickox Award (Best Debut Director)	Best Achievement in Production
Shane Meadows – Twenty Four Seven; Genevieve Joliffe – Urban Ghost Story; Peter Mullan – Orphans; Andrew Piddington – The Fall; Guy Ritchie – Lock, Stock and Two Smoking Barrels	Matthew Vaughn – Lock, Stock and Two Smoking Barrels; Jake West and Robert Mercer – Razor Blade Smile; Allan Scott and Peter R. Simpson – Regeneration; Simon Rumley and Alex Tate – Strong Language; Chris Jones, Jagjit Singh Banwait, David Hardwick and Ian Hierons – Urban Ghost Story
Producer of the Year
Philippa Braithwaite for her work on Sliding Doors
Special Jury Prize	Lifetime Achievement Award
Nik Powell	Ken Loach

=== Films with multiple nominations ===
Nominations	Film
6	Nil by Mouth
5	My Name is Joe
5	Lock, Stock and Two Smoking Barrels
3	Regeneration
2	Twenty Four Seven
2	Under The Skin
2	My Son The Fanatic
2	Orphans
2	Strong Language
2	Urban Ghost Story
