= Boston Society of Film Critics Award for Best New Filmmaker =

The Boston Society of Film Critics has presented an annual Award for Best New Filmmaker since 1996; the recipients of the inaugural prize were Campbell Scott and Stanley Tucci, co-directors of Big Night.

== 1990s ==
Year	Winner(s)	Film
1996	Campbell Scott and Stanley Tucci	Big Night
1997	Paul Thomas Anderson	Hard Eight
1997	Paul Thomas Anderson	Boogie Nights
1998	Carine Adler	Under the Skin
1999	Kimberly Peirce	Boys Don't Cry

== 2000s ==
Year	Winner	Film
2000	Kenneth Lonergan	You Can Count on Me
2001	Michael Cuesta	L.I.E.
2002	Peter Care	The Dangerous Lives of Altar Boys
2003	Andrew Jarecki	Capturing the Friedmans
2004	Jonathan Caouette	Tarnation
2005	Joe Wright	Pride & Prejudice
2006	Ryan Fleck	Half Nelson
2007	Ben Affleck	Gone Baby Gone
2008	Martin McDonagh	In Bruges
2009	Neill Blomkamp	District 9

== 2010s ==
Year	Winner	Film
2010	Jeff Malmberg	Marwencol
2011	Sean Durkin	Martha Marcy May Marlene
2012	David France	How to Survive a Plague
2013	Ryan Coogler	Fruitvale Station
2014	Dan Gilroy	Nightcrawler
2015	Marielle Heller	The Diary of a Teenage Girl
2016	Robert Eggers	The Witch
2017	Jordan Peele	Get Out
2018	Bo Burnham	Eighth Grade
2019	Joe Talbot	The Last Black Man in San Francisco

== 2020s ==
Year	Winner	Film
2020	Florian Zeller	The Father
2021	Maggie Gyllenhaal	The Lost Daughter
2022	Charlotte Wells	Aftersun
2023	Celine Song	Past Lives
2024	Annie Baker	Janet Planet
