= Boston Society of Film Critics Awards 1998 =

Cinematographic award

19th BSFC Awards

December 13, 1998

Best Film:
Out of Sight

The 19th Boston Society of Film Critics Awards honored the best films of 1998. The awards were given on 13 December 1998.

== Winners ==
=== Best Film ===
1. Out of Sight
2. The General
3. Saving Private Ryan

=== Best Actor ===
1. Brendan Gleeson – The General and I Went Down
2. George Clooney – Out of Sight
3. John Hurt – Love and Death on Long Island

=== Best Actress ===
1. Samantha Morton – Under the Skin
2. Ally Sheedy – High Art
3. Cate Blanchett – Elizabeth
3. Jane Horrocks – Little Voice

=== Best Supporting Actor (tie) ===
1. William H. Macy – Pleasantville, A Civil Action and Psycho
1. Billy Bob Thornton – A Simple Plan
3. Robert De Niro – Great Expectations
3. Stephen Rea – The Butcher Boy

=== Best Supporting Actress ===
1. Joan Allen – Pleasantville
2. Patricia Clarkson – High Art
3. Bridget Fonda – A Simple Plan

=== Best Director ===
1. John Boorman – The General
2. Steven Soderbergh – Out of Sight
3. Roberto Benigni – Life Is Beautiful

=== Best Screenplay ===
1. Scott Frank – Out of Sight
2. Marc Norman and Tom Stoppard – Shakespeare in Love
3. Ed Decter, John J. Strauss, Peter Farrelly and Bobby Farrelly – There's Something About Mary

=== Best Cinematography ===
- Janusz Kamiński – Saving Private Ryan

=== Best Documentary ===
1. The Big One
2. Dear Jesse
3. Theme: Murder

=== Best Foreign-Language Film ===
1. Taste of Cherry (Ta'm e guilass) • Iran/France
2. The Celebration (Festen) • Denmark
3. Life Is Beautiful (La vita è bella) • Italy

=== Best New Filmmaker ===
- Carine Adler – Under the Skin
