= Tania Emery =

British actress

- Born: June 26, 1976 (age 50); Windsor, England, United Kingdom
- Children: 1

Tania Merle Emery (born June 26, 1976) is a British actress from Windsor, England, known for her television role as DC Kate Spears in the ITV police drama The Bill.

Before joining The Bill in 2000, she filmed a trilogy of films about London life all under the same director, Simon Rumley. These movies include; The Truth Game, Strong Language and Club Le Monde. Emery has appeared in various shorts such as Dolls and Makers where she played lead character Anne, and Commercial Hairdressing for director Andy Isaacs. And she also appeared in the Model Raj at Waterman's Arts Centre and played three different characters in BBC Radio 4's – The Actress, The Writer and The Censor.

Before joining the cast of The Bill as a regular, she appeared in an episode of The Bill, in an episode called “Bad Habits”, playing a beaten-up prostitute named Dawn South. She joined the regular cast in 2000 as DC Kate Spears ("On The Hook – Part 1"). The start of the make over of the show with the addition of young, good-looking police officers and a whole new CID team. Emery describes Spears as: "a feisty kick ass kind of girl". After two years, Emery was given the sack by the new executive producer who killed off Spears along with several other under-used characters in "The Sun Hill Fire" (008).

After The Bill, Emery made a guest appearance in an episode of the series Doctors and reprised her role as Kate Spears for a spoof skit show, Jon Culshaw. She had roles in the films LD 50 Lethal Dose and Den of Lions, and in 2004 appeared as Frida in a stage production of Luigi Pirandello's Henry IV at the Donmar Warehouse, London. Emery played a reporter in the 2005 mock documentary-style film Brothers of the Head about conjoined twins who become a rock phenomenon, with one of whom her character has a relationship.

On 26 September 2008, Emery appeared in Robson Green's Wire in the Blood as Dr Rachel White, who is murdered in her hotel room.
