= Samantha Morton =

British actress (born 1977)

Samantha Morton OBE
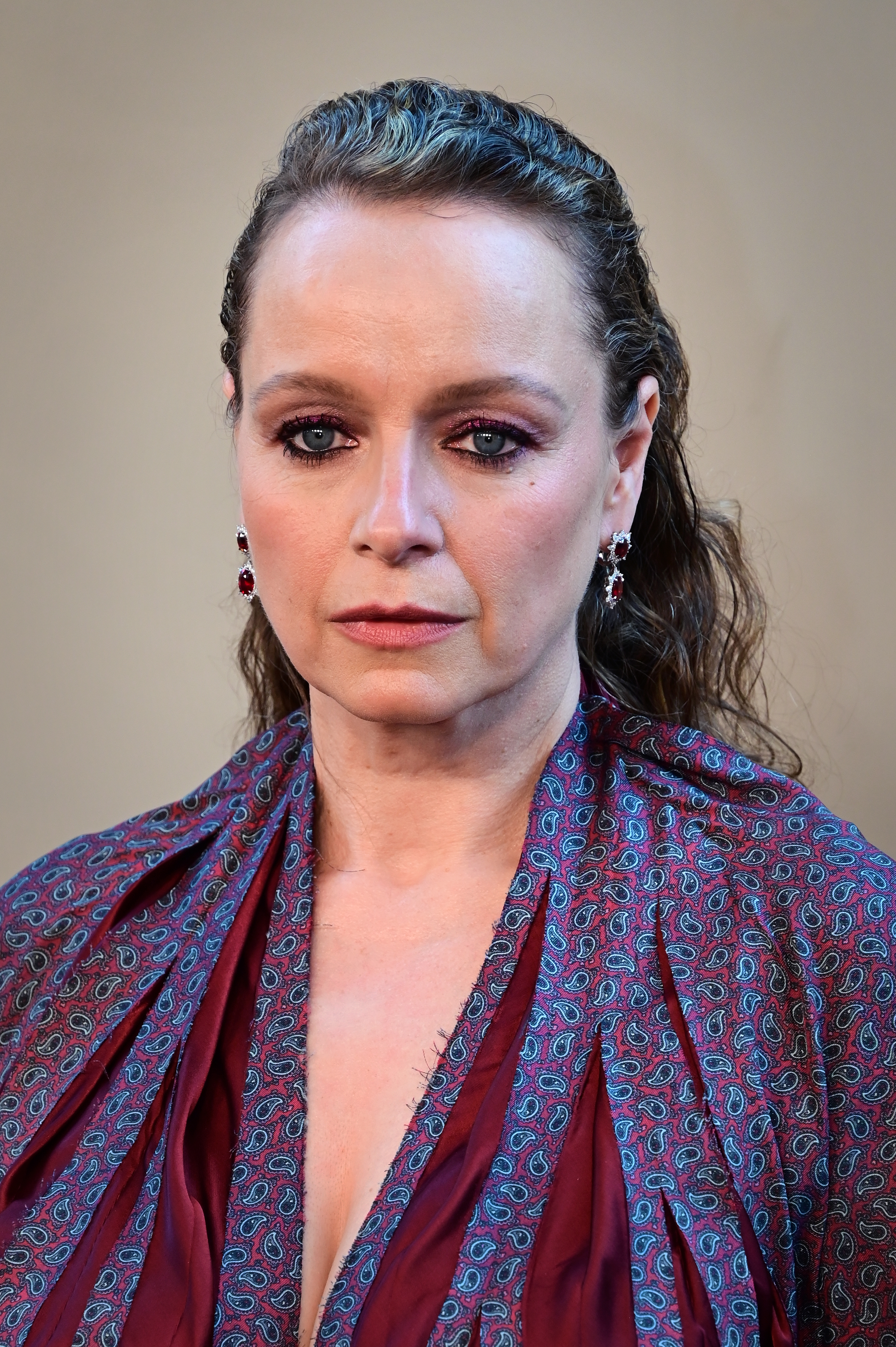
- Morton in 2026
- Born: Samantha Jane Morton; 13 May 1977 (age 49); Nottingham, England
- Occupations: Actress; musician
- Years active: 1991–present
- Partner: Harry Holm (2005–present)
- Children: 3, including Esmé Creed-Miles
- Awards: Full list

Samantha Jane Morton (born 13 May 1977) is an English actress and musician. Known for her work in independent films, particularly period dramas with dark and tragic themes, she has received various accolades including a British Academy Television Award and a Golden Globe Award, with nominations for two Academy Awards, a British Academy Film Award and a Primetime Emmy Award.

Morton made her film debut in 1996 before her breakthrough role in Under the Skin (1997). She would go on to receive two Academy Award nominations for Best Supporting Actress playing a young mute laundress in Woody Allen's romance Sweet and Lowdown (1999) and Best Actress for playing an Irish immigrant in Jim Sheridan's In America (2003). She has also acted in the films Jane Eyre (1997), Morvern Callar (2002), Minority Report (2002), Control (2007), Elizabeth: The Golden Age (2007), Synecdoche, New York (2008), The Messenger (2009), Cosmopolis (2012), Fantastic Beasts and Where to Find Them (2016), The Whale (2022), and The Odyssey (2026).

A member of the Central Junior Television Workshop, she gained recognition for acting in the ITV series Band of Gold (1995–96). She portrayed Myra Hindley in the BBC crime drama Longford (2007) which earned her the Golden Globe Award as well as a nominations for the BAFTA Award and Primetime Emmy Award. She has also acted in the children's series Max & Ruby (2002–2004), the Hulu period drama Harlots (2017–19), the AMC horror series The Walking Dead (2019–20) and the Starz historical drama series The Serpent Queen (2022–24).

Morton was honored with the BAFTA Fellowship in 2024 and was appointed Officer of the Order of the British Empire (OBE) in 2025 for services to drama and to charity.

Outside acting, Morton made her directorial debut with the television film The Unloved (2009), winning the BAFTA TV Award, and her musical debut with the collaborative album Daffodils & Dirt (2024).

== Early life and education ==
Morton was born in Nottingham, the third child of Pamela (née Mallek), a factory worker, and Peter Morton. She is of Polish/Irish descent. She has five siblings from her parents' relationships subsequent to their 1979 divorce. She was placed into foster care from birth, when she was made a ward of court because neither of her parents could care for her and her siblings. Her father was an abusive alcoholic who was in and out of prison, and her mother was involved in a violent relationship with her second husband.

The next 16 years were spent in and out of foster care and children's homes. During that time, she attended West Bridgford Comprehensive School and joined the Central Junior Television Workshop when she was 13, soon being offered small-screen roles in Soldier Soldier and Boon.

Under the effects of drugs, she threatened an older girl who had been bullying her. She was convicted of making threats to kill and served 18 weeks in an attendance centre.

== Career ==
=== 1991–1998: Career beginnings ===
After joining Central Junior Television Workshop at the age of 13, she was soon being offered small-screen roles such as Clare Anderson in the first series of Lucy Gannon's Soldier Soldier and also Mandy, in an episode of Boon— both were ITV Central productions. Moving to London at sixteen, Morton applied to numerous drama schools, including RADA, without success. In 1991, she attended Clarendon College of Performing Arts to gain a BTEC award but subsequently left for personal reasons. She made her stage début at the Royal Court Theatre, and continued her television career with appearances in Peak Practice and in an episode of Cracker. At the time, she had a regular role in the first two series of Kay Mellor's successful Band of Gold (1995–96).

Further television roles followed, including parts in period dramas such as Emma and Jane Eyre. Emma was a film adaptation of the novel of the same name published in 1815 about youthful hubris and the perils of misconstrued romance. The movie received largely positive reviews from critics and was broadcast in late 1996 on ITV, gaining an estimated 12 million viewers. In Jane Eyre, Morton starred as a Yorkshire orphan who becomes a governess to a young French girl and finds love with the brooding lord of the manor. Like her previous small-screen projects, the 1997 film originally aired on ITV.

She took on the leading role in the independent drama Under the Skin (1997), directed by Carine Adler, where she played Iris, a woman coping with the death of her mother. The movie garnered favorable reviews from writers, with The Guardian placing it at number 15 on its list of the Best British Films 1984–2009. Janet Maslin for The New York Times remarked that Morton "embodies the role with furious intensity and with a raw yet waifish presence" and James Berardinelli wrote that the actress "forces us to accept Iris as a living, breathing individual". She won the Best Actress accolade at the 1998 Boston Society of Film Critics Awards and was nominated for the BIFA for Best Female Performance in a British Independent Film.

=== 1999–2005: Critical recognition ===
IN 1999, impressed by her performance in Under the Skin, Woody Allen cast her in Sweet and Lowdown, a romantic comedy about a fictional jazz guitarist in the 1930s (played by Sean Penn) who regards himself as the second greatest guitarist in the world. Morton played Hattie, a mute laundress and the love interest of Penn's character. The film was released in September 1999, to wide critical acclaim and moderate success at the box office in the arthouse circuit. George Perry for BBC.com found her to be "extraordinary" as an "adoring mute who suffers [...] She uses her eyes to convey meaning, reviving techniques of silent cinema". Morton earned Academy Award and Golden Globe nominations for Best Supporting Actress for her role, which was especially notable, considering the fact that she does not utter a single word of dialogue in the film. During a 2007 interview with UK's The Guardian, she remarked that her Oscar nomination meant "incredible things for me in the [United States]. I'm grateful for that. It means that [...] I'm able to support the industry".

In 1999, Morton starred in the small scale drama Jesus' Son, which found a limited release, and praise from critics. She received a Satellite Award nomination for Best Supporting Actress – Motion Picture for her performance. Her other film in 1999 was the romantic drama Dreaming of Joseph Lees, an adaptation of a story written by Catherine Linstrum set in rural England in the late 1950s; for her part, she won the Evening Standard British Film Award for Best Actress. She appeared in the biographical drama Pandaemonium (2000), directed by Julien Temple, playing Sara Coleridge, the wife of the poet Samuel Taylor Coleridge. She was nominated for a British Independent Film Award in the category of Best Actress. Morton also played a mermaid opposite Larry Mullen in the Anton Corbijn-directed promotional video for U2's "Electrical Storm", and provided the voice of Ruby for the Canadian animated series Max & Ruby from 2002 to 2003.

In 2002, Morton found wider recognition and mainstream success when she took on the part of a senior precog in Steven Spielberg science fiction thriller Minority Report, opposite Tom Cruise. Although critics felt she was "slightly typecast" in her role of "feral, near-mute victim", Minority Report grossed US$358 million. She won the Saturn Award for Best Supporting Actress and the Empire Award for Best British Actress. In her next film, the drama Morvern Callar, she played a grieving young woman from Scotland who decides to escape to Spain after the suicide of her boyfriend. Writing for Rolling Stone, Peter Travers stated that Morton "fills this character study with poetic force and buoyant feeling", as part of a positive critical response, and she earned the Best Actress Award at the 5th British Independent Film Awards and the 7th Toronto Film Critics Association Awards.

In the independent drama In America (2003), directed by Jim Sheridan, Morton played the matriarch of an immigrant Irish family struggling to start a new life in New York. In America met widespread critical acclaim, with Terry Lawson of Detroit Free Press calling the film "an achingly intimate and beautifully observed account of the immigrant experience". Roger Ebert felt that Morton "reveals the power of her silences, her quiet [and] her presence", while A. O. Scott, of The New York Times, found the "blunt, inarticulate force of her feeling [...] at the center of the drama". Her performance earned her nominations for the Academy Award, the Independent Spirit Award, and the Broadcast Film Critics Association Award in the category of Best Actress.

In 2004, Morton starred as a love interest in the dystopian film Code 46, directed by Michael Winterbottom and alongside Tim Robbins, and played the wife of a man who witnessed a deadly accident in the drama Enduring Love, opposite Rhys Ifans and Daniel Craig. Critics were polarized for the latter film and suggested that Morton did not have enough time on screen. She earned a nomination for the Best Supporting Award at the 2004 British Independent Film Awards. In River Queen (2005), she took on the role of a young Irish woman finding herself on both sides of the wars between British and Maori during the British colonisation of New Zealand. The film was a box office success at the New Zealand box office, grossing around NZ$1 million in the country. For her role, she received a nomination for the New Zealand Screen Award for Best Leading Actress. She starred alongside Johnny Depp in the little-seen period drama The Libertine, and appeared in the drama Lassie, both of which were also released in 2005.

=== 2006–2009: Biopics and directorial debut ===
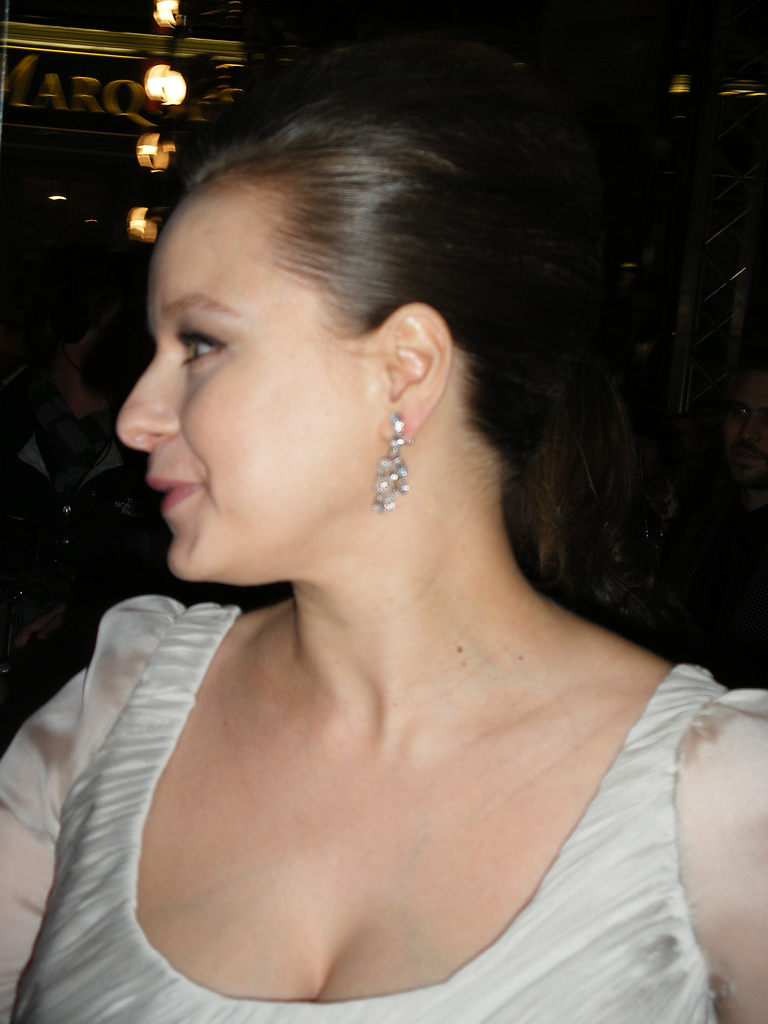
Morton at the 62nd British Academy Film Awards on 8 February 2008

In 2006, she played the Moors murderess Myra Hindley in the television film Longford. Set between 1967 and 1997, the film depicts the relationship between the child murderer and Lord Longford, the politician who spent years campaigning (ultimately unsuccessfully) for her release. Longford was a critical success and premiered with 1.7 million viewers. Morton was severely criticised by the relatives of the children who were killed by Hindley and Ian Brady, but she insisted, "It is my duty as a performer to raise issues [...] we're afraid to look at". She received a Best Supporting Actress nomination at the 59th Primetime Emmy Awards, and won at the 65th Golden Globe Awards.

In 2007, Morton acted in four feature films. She starred as a struggling police officer in the romantic drama Expired, and portrayed a Marilyn Monroe impersonator in the dramedy Mister Lonely alongside her daughter Esmé Creed-Miles who portrayed a Shirley Temple impersonator. Morton worked again with director Anton Corbijn in the biographical film Control, where she appeared as Deborah Curtis, wife of musician Ian Curtis from the band Joy Division, whose biography Touching from a Distance formed the basis of the film. The film was acclaimed by critics. Roger Ebert remarked that Morton was "absolutely convincing as a plucky teenage bride", and Variety magazine found her performance to be "astonishing" and "sympathetic". For Control, she was nominated for the BAFTA Award for Best Actress in a Supporting Role. Her last film of 2007 was another biopic, Elizabeth: The Golden Age, in which she played Mary, Queen of Scots.

In 2008, she was part of an ensemble cast in Charlie Kaufman's postmodern drama Synecdoche, New York (2008), alongside Philip Seymour Hoffman, Michelle Williams and Emily Watson. In the film, she portrayed Hazel, one of the women in the life of a theatre director (Hoffman) whose extreme commitment to a realistic stage production begins to blur the boundaries between fiction and reality. As her character ages from 30 to 64 over the course of the story, Morton used full-face prosthetic makeup. She discovered that she was pregnant during the filming, which had a schedule that took up to 20 hours a day.

The film was a box office bomb, but garnered praise from critics, appearing on many top ten lists of the year. Morton and her co-stars were eventually nominated for the Best Ensemble Performance award at the 18th Gotham Independent Film Awards. Also in 2008, she starred in The Daisy Chain, an Irish horror film about a couple who after the death of their daughter, take in an orphaned girl, only to become involved in a series of strange occurrences. It premiered at the 16th Raindance Film Festival (London; October 2008), and received a DVD release in 2010.

In 2009, in the directorial debut of Jesus' Son screenwriter Oren Moverman, the war drama The Messenger, Morton starred as Oliva Patterson, a widow whose husband was killed in Iraq. She was drawn to the "feminine" side of the story and found her part to be "one of the first characters [she has] played in a long time where [she has] felt so much in common", as her brother and stepfather both served as soldiers in the military forces. Critical reception towards The Messenger and Morton was unanimously favorable, with Claudia Puig of USA Today asserting that, Morton "as always, gives a subtle, excellent performance". She was nominated for Best Supporting Actress at the 14th Broadcast Film Critics Association Awards and the 25th Independent Spirit Awards.

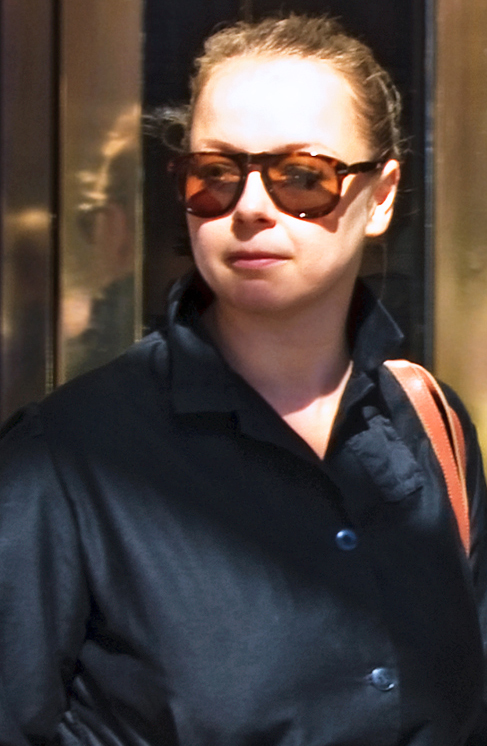
Morton at the 2009 Toronto International Film Festival

Morton's other project of 2009 was her directorial debut, the semi-autobiographical Channel 4 drama The Unloved, which follows an eleven-year-old girl (played by Molly Windsor) growing up in a children's home in the UK's care system, and shown through her perspective. Morton wrote the story in collaboration with Tony Grisoni, and The Unloved was first broadcast on 17 May 2009, drawing nearly 2 million viewers. It premiered at the Toronto International Film Festival in September 2009. Michael Deacon, for The Daily Telegraph, praised Morton on creating an "intense" and "vivid" dramatic film. Morton won a BAFTA for her direction in 2010.

=== 2010–2014: Hiatus and return to film ===
Following a three-year hiatus from the screen to focus on her personal life and family, Morton returned in 2012. She provided the voice of Sola in the science fiction film John Carter, based on A Princess of Mars, which received mixed reviews and flopped at the box office. She next played a chief of theory in the thriller Cosmopolis, directed by David Cronenberg. Her role, described as "misjudged" by The Guardian, earned her a nomination as Best Actress in a Canadian Film Award at the Vancouver Film Critics Circle. She also served as a jury member at the 69th Venice International Film Festival in 2012.

In 2013, Morton was the original voice of the artificially intelligent operating system in the romantic science fiction drama Her directed by Spike Jonze. In post-production she was replaced by Scarlett Johansson. She is, however, credited as an associate producer. Speaking about being replaced in 2026, Morton said: "I think my version of Samantha was very... she's English. It was just very, very different... It does hurt when you’re fired from something or before it. I don't know. What I’d have wished for was another chance in a booth to do an American accent."

Morton starred in the independent drama Decoding Annie Parker (2013) opposite Helen Hunt, playing a woman with breast cancer. The film was released in limited theaters, to mixed reviews from critics. Nevertheless, Betsey Sharkey of Los Angeles Times observed that the actress "gives Parker such a humility within a warm humanity that you feel an obligation to stick with her through the mounting horrors". She was awarded the Best Actress Golden Space Needle Award at the 2013 Seattle International Film Festival.

Morton starred opposite Michael Shannon in the independent thriller The Harvest (also 2013), as a controlling mother keeping her sick son in a secluded environment. Several critics such as Peter Debruge (Variety) and Nikola Grozdanovic (Indiewire) compared her role of Katherine to Kathy Bates' Annie Wilkes in Misery (1990). Her performance earned her a Best Actress Award nomination at the 2014 BloodGuts UK Horror Awards.

In Liv Ullmann's film adaptation Miss Julie (2014), alongside Colin Farrell and Jessica Chastain, Morton portrayed Kathleen, the fiancée of a valet (Farrell) who finds himself seduced by the daughter of an Anglo-Irish aristocracy (Chastain). The film screened at the Toronto International Film Festival and had a limited release in the UK, France and Spain. Miss Julie rated average with reviewers, but the cast received acclaim. Writing for The Hollywood Reporter, David Rooney thought Morton's Kathleen was "the most satisfyingly drawn character" of the film, which he considered a "ponderous, stately affair".

=== 2015–present: Roles in television ===
In 2015, Morton starred as a mother in the First World War context in Cider with Rosie, a made-for-television adaptation of the book of the same name by Laurie Lee, and took on the role of an insurance investigator charged with recovering stolen diamonds in the European limited television series The Last Panthers, inspired by the notorious Balkan jewel thieves the Pink Panthers. Morton found her character to be a "very truthful, [...] strong woman" and described her as a "female Bond". Genevieve Valentine, for The AV Club, wrote: "Morton might at first seem a tough sell as someone so hard-boiled, but the taciturn, untouchable edifice she presents is leaking just enough poison at the edges that we look forward to watching her strike—the sort of character a six-hour miniseries was made for".

Morton appeared in Fantastic Beasts and Where to Find Them (2016), a spin-off from the Harry Potter film series, with a screenplay by J. K. Rowling. In the film, she portrayed Mary Lou Barebone, the leader of an extremist group whose goals include exposing and killing wizards and witches. Fantastic Beasts grossed US$814 million at the international box office, becoming Morton's most successful and widely seen film to that date.

She filmed the three-part television crime drama Rillington Place (also 2016), based on the case of serial killer John Christie, who murdered several women in London during 1940s and early 1950s. Morton was cast opposite Tim Roth as Christie's wife, Ethel. Intrigued by their relationship, Morton felt the depiction of the "psychological aspect of love" in the story "really developed [her] acting chops" but considered as a challenge "to play someone so submissive" as Ethel. The miniseries premiered in BBC One and was favourably received by critics. The Guardian found Morton to be "strong" in her "difficult role", and The Independent remarked that she "gave a fine, nuanced performance" as "a woman trapped under her husband's spell".

Beginning in 2017, Morton has starred in the Hulu period drama series Harlots. She portrays Margaret Wells, the madam of a low-class brothel who seeks to improve her fortunes. The response from critics and audiences has been highly positive. The Telegraph found her to be the "standout performer", and The Atlantic noted: "While the role doesn't give Morton the same room to flex her acting muscles as, say, Woody Allen's Sweet and Lowdown, she gives depth and moral conflict to a character who could easily be a pantomime dame in the wrong hands".

In July 2018, it was announced that Morton had been cast in the role of Alpha in The Walking Dead, making her first appearance in February 2019. Alpha is the villainous leader of the Whisperers, a mysterious group of survivors of a zombie apocalypse who—as a method of self-concealment—wear skins taken from the undead.

In 2022, Morton began starring as Catherine de' Medici in the Starz television series The Serpent Queen. Also in 2022, Morton returned to the big screen in three different roles: in The Whale, she played the ex-wife of Brendan Fraser's reclusive and morbidly obese professor; in Save the Cinema, she starred as a hairdresser campaigning to save a local theater from closing; and in She Said, Morton played Zelda Perkins, who revealed to New York Times reporter Jodi Kantor the details of non-disclosure agreements by which sexual assault victims of Harvey Weinstein, co-founder and at that time co-chairman of Miramax Films, her former employer, were bound.

As a musician, Morton is a member of the duo Sam Morton, along with Richard Russell. The duo's debut studio album, Daffodils & Dirt, was released in 2024.

Morton portrays Circe, a goddess who bewitches Odysseus and his crew, in Christopher Nolan's 2026 film, The Odyssey. Her performance has received acclaim; Nolan and the film's crew reportedly applauded after one of her takes.

== Personal life ==
Morton dated actor Charlie Creed-Miles, whom she met on the set of the film The Last Yellow, in 1999. They broke up when Morton was 15 weeks pregnant with their daughter, actress Esmé Creed-Miles, born in February 2000.

Morton met filmmaker Harry Holm (son of actor Ian Holm) while filming a music video for the band The Vitamins. They had a daughter and a son, and as of 2012 lived in Monyash, Derbyshire.

In early 2008, Morton revealed that she had been "close to death" after suffering a debilitating stroke after being hit on the head by a piece of 17th-century plaster, damaging her vertebral artery, in 2006. She was in hospital for three weeks after the incident. She took an 18-month break from public life and acting to learn to walk again.

In 2011, Morton wrote an open letter to her stepfather, hoping they would get back in touch after being estranged for several years. However, it was soon revealed that her stepfather had died of prostate cancer four years previously.

On 20 July 2011, Morton received an honorary Doctor of Letters (DLitt) from Nottingham Trent University, "in recognition of her internationally successful acting career".

Morton is a Catholic and describes herself as 'quite religious.'

Morton was appointed Officer of the Order of the British Empire (OBE) in the 2025 Birthday Honours for services to drama and to charity.

=== Charity work ===
Having been raised in the foster care system, Morton has often been active in related causes. In March 2009, Morton returned to her hometown to show her support for its children's homes and protest against the threatened closure, by Nottingham City Council, of one of the four establishments with 24 social-care staff facing redundancy. In 2012, Morton showed her support for the Fostering Network's annual campaign Foster Care Fortnight, and in September 2014, triggered by the Rotherham child sexual exploitation scandal, she discussed in a video interview the sexual abuse she experienced while in the foster care system as a child in Nottingham and that the police took no action when she reported the abuse. Morton had discussed the abuse previously while promoting the semi-autobiographical drama The Unloved, in an article for The Guardian.

In 2008, she was part of the Vodafone Foundation's World of Difference campaign, which gives people the opportunity to work for a charity of their choice. Whilst attending a fundraiser for the charity Medical Aid for Palestinians (MAP) in January 2009, she vowed never to work for the BBC again after their refusal to broadcast an emergency charity appeal for the victims of Israel's attack on Gaza on 27 December 2008. She was later joined by Tam Dean Burn, Pauline Goldsmith, Peter Mullan, and Alison Peebles, who also threatened to boycott the corporation. In 2009, she also fronted a television advertising recruitment campaign for social workers in the UK.

== Acting credits ==
=== Film ===
Year	Title	Role	Notes
1996	Future Lasts a Long Time	May	Short film
1997	This Is the Sea	Hazel Stokes	
1997	Under the Skin	Iris Kelly	
1999	Sweet and Lowdown	Hattie	
1999	Jesus' Son	Michelle	
1999	Dreaming of Joseph Lees	Eva	
1999	The Last Yellow	Jackie	
2000	Pandaemonium	Sara Coleridge	
2001	Eden	Sam	
2002	Minority Report	Agatha	
2002	Morvern Callar	Morvern Callar	
2002	In America	Sarah	
2003	Code 46	Maria Gonzales	
2004	Enduring Love	Claire	
2005	River Queen	Sarah O'Brian	
2005	The Libertine	Elizabeth Barry	
2005	Lassie	Sarah Carraclough	
2006	Free Jimmy	Sonia (voice)	English dub
2007	Expired	Claire	
2007	Control	Deborah Curtis	
2007	Elizabeth: The Golden Age	Mary, Queen of Scots	
2007	Mister Lonely	Marilyn Monroe	
2008	Synecdoche, New York	Hazel	
2008	The Daisy Chain	Martha Conroy	
2009	The Messenger	Olivia Pitterson	
2012	John Carter	Sola	Motion capture
2012	Cosmopolis	Vija Kinsky	
2013	Decoding Annie Parker	Anne Parker	
2013	Her	—N/a	Associate producer
2013	The Harvest	Katherine	
2014	Miss Julie	Kathleen	
2015	Call Me Lucky	Herself	Documentary
2016	Fantastic Beasts and Where to Find Them	Mary Lou Barebone	
2018	Two for Joy	Aisha	
2022	Save the Cinema	Liz Evans	
2022	The Whale	Mary	
2022	She Said	Zelda Perkins	
2024	2073	Herself	Documentary film
2025	Anemone	Nessa	
2026	The Odyssey	Circe	
TBA	The Entertainment System Is Down †	TBA	Post-production
TBA	Love and War †	TBA	Pre-production

Key
†	Denotes films that have not yet been released

=== Television ===
Year	Title	Role	Notes
1991	Soldier Soldier	Clare Anderson	4 episodes
1991	Boon	Mandy	Episode: Cab Rank Cowboys
1993	The Token King	Vicky	Television film
1994	Cracker	Joanne Barnes	Serial: "The Big Crunch"
1994	Peak Practice	Abbey	Episode: "Abbey"
1995	The Vet	Amanda Mulholland	3 episodes
1995–1996	Band of Gold	Naomi "Tracy" Richardson	12 episodes
1996	Emma	Harriet Smith	Television film
1997	The History of Tom Jones, a Foundling	Sophia Western	Miniseries
1997	Jane Eyre	Jane Eyre	Television film
2002–2003	Max & Ruby	Ruby (voice)	26 episodes
2006	Longford	Myra Hindley	Television film
2009	The Unloved	—N/a	Director; Television film
2015	Cider with Rosie	Annie Lee	Television film
2015	The Last Panthers	Naomi	6 episodes
2016	Rillington Place	Ethel Christie	Miniseries
2017–2019	Harlots	Margaret Wells	20 episodes
2019	I Am Kirsty	Kirsty	Television film
2019–2020	The Walking Dead	Dee / Alpha	19 episodes
2022	Tales of the Walking Dead	Dee / Alpha	Episode: "Dee"
2022–2024	The Serpent Queen	Catherine de' Medici	16 episodes
2023	The Burning Girls	Reverend Brooks	Miniseries

=== Theater ===
Year	Title	Role	Playwright	Venue	Ref.
1994	Ashes and Sand	Anna	Judy Upton	Royal Court Theatre, West End	
1995	Star-Gazy Pie and Sauerkraut	Kathleen	James Stock	Royal Court Theatre, West End	

=== Video Games ===
Year	Title	Role
2016	Lego Dimensions	Mary Lou Barebone (voice)

== Discography ==
Studio albums

- Daffodils & Dirt (as Sam Morton, 2024)

== See also ==
- List of Academy Award winners and nominees from Great Britain
- List of actors with Academy Award nominations
- List of actors with more than one Academy Award nomination in the acting categories
