= Save the Cinema =

- Directed by: Sara Sugarman
- Written by: Piers Ashworth
- Story by: Lorraine King
- Produced by: Matt Williams; Julia Stuart
- Starring: Jonathan Pryce; Samantha Morton; Tom Felton; Adeel Akhtar; Susan Wokoma
- Production companies: Future Artists Entertainment; Head Gear Films; Kreo Films FZ; Metrol Technology
- Distributed by: Sky Cinema
- Release date: 14 January 2022 (Sky Cinema)
- Running time: 109 minutes
- Country: United Kingdom
- Language: English

Save the Cinema is a 2022 British drama film written by Piers Ashworth and directed by Sara Sugarman, based on the true story of Liz Evans, a hairdresser and leader of a youth theatre in Carmarthen, Wales, who began a campaign in 1993 to save the Lyric cinema from closure. The film features mostly British talent, with principal roles led by Jonathan Pryce, Samantha Morton, Tom Felton, Adeel Akhtar and Susan Wokoma.

Liz Evans was the mother of Huw Evans, a Barrister, and his two younger brothers Wynne Evans, a principal of the Welsh National Opera who, since 2009, has appeared as a fictional Italian tenor called Gio Compario in the advertising campaign for GoCompare; and Mark Llewellyn Evans, a member of the English National Opera and founder of ABC of Opera. Wynne and Mark both appear in the film in cameo roles.

== Plot ==
Liz Evans is a hairdresser and leader of a youth theatre in Carmarthen, Wales, who started a campaign in 1993 to save the Lyric cinema from closure. She and a local councillor enlist the help of Steven Spielberg, securing a special premiere for Jurassic Park.

== Cast ==
- Jonathan Pryce as Mr. Morgan, Liz's former school teacher
- Samantha Morton as Liz Evans
- Tom Felton as Richard Goodridge, the local postman and a councillor, later Mayor
- Adeel Akhtar as Tom, the Mayor
- Susan Wokoma as Dolly, an assistant in the hair salon
- Erin Richards as Susan, the Mayor's secretary
- Owain Yeoman as David Evans, husband of Liz
- Rhod Gilbert as Mr. Powell
- Dora Davis as Carol
- Leanne Holder as Mourner
- Joe Hurst as Huw Evans
- Thaer Al-Shayei as Mr. Hopkins
- Fflyn Edwards as Wynne Evans
- Harry Luke as Mark Llewellyn Evans
- Reegan Davies as Megan
- Huw Morgan as Police Officer
- Matthew Lee as Screening Member
- Mitchell Zhangazha as Judas
- Mathew Guerin as Bailiff/Screening Member
- Keith Allen as Superintendent Evans
- Melanie Walters as Mrs. Pritchett

== Production ==
Filming began in January 2021, under strict health protocols due to the COVID-19 pandemic. Filming took place around Carmarthenshire, Wales. Locations included the Lyric cinema, Ammanford town hall, and the towns Laugharne and Llandeilo.

== Release ==
Save the Cinema was released in the United Kingdom on 14 January 2022. The film earned a worldwide total of $78,391.

== Reception ==
Save the Cinema has received a mixed response since its release, with many critics, particularly those in Wales pointing out the lack of Welsh talent and the accents that felt inauthentic and more like parody than real Welsh accents. An Article by Nation.Cymru called for more Welsh representation in Welsh cinema, citing Save the Cinema as a particularly poor effort.
