= Charles De'Ath =

English actor (born 1968)

- Born: Charles Lawrence De'Ath; 24 May 1968 (age 58); Hampstead, London, England
- Occupation: Actor
- Years active: 1994–present

Charles Lawrence De'Ath (/diˈɑːt/; born 24 May 1968), also known as Charlie De'Ath, Charles De-Ath and Charles Death, is an English film and television actor.

== Early life ==
De'Ath is the son of Wilfred De'Ath and was educated at Woolverstone Hall School from 1979 to 1984. Woolverstone was a state-run (ILEA) boys' boarding school, near Ipswich in Suffolk.

== Selected filmography ==
Film
Year	Film	Role	Notes
1994	Fatherland	Fake Porter	
1995	Face to Face	Simon	
1995	ID	Nik	
1995	Feast of July	Billy Swaine	
1996	Different for Girls	Young Man at Gig	
1999	G:MT – Greenwich Mean Time	Chris	
2000	Command Approved	Ships Officer	
2000	Forgive and Forget	Alex	Credited as Charlie De'Ath
2000	Strong Language	Stuart	Credited as Charlie De'Ath
2000	Greenfingers	Julian	
2000	In His Life: The John Lennon Story	Peter Eckhorn	
2002	Revenger's Tragedy	Sordido	
2002	A Is for Acid	Sgt. Symes	
2003	Loving You	Prosecutor	
2005	Harold the Amazing Contortionist Pig	Vet	
2013	Walking with the Enemy	Lt. Krieger	
2018	Where Hands Touch	SS Kruger	Credited as Charlie De'Ath
Television
Year	Title	Role	Notes
1995	Wycliffe	Stephen Ling	One episode: "Four and Twenty Blackbirds"
1997	A Touch of Frost	D.C. Collier	Two episodes: "Penny for the Guy", "House Calls"
1997	Dangerfield	Gary Showcross	One episode: "Adam"
1998	The New Adventures of Robin Hood	Count Lucerne	One episode: "The Assassin"
1999	Sunburn	Mark	One episode
2000	City Central	Derek Reska	One episode: "Above and Beyond"
2000	Urban Gothic	Giles	One episode: "Vampirology"
2000	Emmerdale	Daniel Dean	Three episodes: two in 1999, one in 2000
2001	As If	Philip	One episode: "Jaime's POV"
2002	All About Me	Bank Manager	One episode
2003	Mile High	Prince Bertil	One episode
2003	The Royal	Simon Wake-Palmer	One episode: "The Unbreakable Chain"
2004	The Courtroom	Trevor Wyatt	One episode: "Gastos"
2005	Down to Earth	Richard Miller	One episode: "Ignorance is Bliss"
2007	Bonkers	Mr. Linton	One episode
2007	The Bill	Miscellaneous Roles: 1993–2007	Four episodes: "Gone For a Soldier", "Cold Calling" (credited as Charles Death), "197", "Getting Away with Murder"
2007	The Last Detective	DS Pimlott: 2003–2007	Seventeen episodes
2008	Casualty	Simon (2001) and Doug Stanley (2008)	Two episodes: "Girl Power", "Silent All These Years"
2008	Doctors	Richard Sutton (2001) and Charlie Driver (2008)	Two episodes: "Baby Be Mine" (credited as Charles De-Ath), "Everything Counts"
2009	Moving On	Sergeant Connelly	One episode: "The Butterfly Effect"
2009	Doctor Who	Adelaide's Father	One episode: Autumn 2009 Special "The Waters of Mars" (credited as Charlie De'Ath)
2013–2015	WPC 56	Sergeant Sidney Fenton	Three series
2014	Waterloo Road	Vincent Wark	One episode: "Bad Girl"
2014	That Day We Sang	Lionel	TV film
2014	Our Zoo	Land Agent	One episode: "The Idea"
2015	Hollyoaks	Mr. Booth	Two episodes: 9 September 2015 and 10 September 2015
2015	EastEnders	DS Craig Pike, aka "Mystery Man"	
2020	Vera	Tony Hinshaw	One episode: "The Escape Turn" (S10:E4)
