= Marlow (TV series) =

British television series

- Genre: Crime thriller
- Screenplay by: Tony Grisoni; Simon Maxwell
- Starring: Claire Foy
- Country of origin: United Kingdom
- Original language: English
- No. of episodes: 8

Production
- Production companies: Motive Pictures; Endeavor Content

Original release
- Network: BritBox
- Release: 2026

Marlow is an upcoming crime thriller television programme on BritBox starring Claire Foy. The eight-episode series was produced by Motive Pictures and Endeavor Content.

== Synopsis ==
The series follows two feuding families the Marlows and the Wyatts in the Thames Estuary.

== Development ==
The series was written by screenwriters Tony Grisoni and Simon Maxwell.
