= Stephen B. Grimes =

Production designer

- Born: 18 April 1927; Weybridge, Surrey, England
- Died: 12 September 1988 (aged 61); Positano, Italy
- Occupations: Production designer Art director
- Years active: 1944–1988
- Children: 5, including Oona Grimes

Stephen B. Grimes (18 April 1927 – 12 September 1988) was an English production designer and art director. He won an Oscar and was nominated for two more in the category Best Art Direction.

Starting work in the British film industry after the Second World War as a sketch-artist, from the mid-1950s to the late 1960s Grimes worked almost exclusively with John Huston, a collaboration that resulted in 14 films in over 30 years. Grimes also had a fruitful long-term working relationship with Sydney Pollack, making seven films with him, and he was also employed by directors such as David Lean, Peter Yates, Mark Rydell and Ulu Grosbard.

One of his great strengths as a production designer was his skill as an artist: in researching and preparing a film he would produce many beautiful, dramatic and atmospheric sketches. These would help the director, director of photography and other key personnel to create the visual style and look of a film. Grimes understood the importance of light, space and texture – he put more into his sketches than most art directors – and tended to make sketches as much as or more than take photographs. He was not lavish; he liked the challenge of getting a good visual look with essentials, combining observation and imagination. Grimes was conscientious with high standards, and poured himself into his work.

== Biography ==
Stephen B. Grimes was born in Weybridge, the second of seven children of Leslie and Nancy Grimes. Leslie was an artist and cartoonist. Three of his brothers, Michael, Bruce and Colin, also worked in the British film and TV industry as art directors or assistant art directors. Colin Grimes sometimes assisted Stephen.

Grimes grew up in Haslemere, Surrey, Peldon in Essex, and Lansdowne Road, Notting Hill Gate, London. He went to St Martin's School of Art in the late 1940s, where he met and then married Kathleen Grimes (née Sanders). They had five children, including Oona Grimes. Grimes was in the British Army at the tail-end of the Second World War.

After a forty-year career in film, Grimes died in Italy in September 1988 while supplying preparatory work for Axel Corti's film The King's Whore.

== Work as sketch artist or draughtsman ==
After leaving art school Grimes was told that they were employing sketch artists at Denham Studios. He went along with a portfolio of work and was taken on. Carmen Dillon took him 'under her wing' and he also worked alongside Oliver Messel, Vertchinsky, Paul Sheriff, Hein Heckroth, Ivor Beddoes, John Box and Ralph Brinton. From the mid-1940s to mid-1950s Grimes worked as a sketch artist or draughtsman on a variety of films made at Denham and Pinewood Studios, including:

- Henry V (1944); directed by Laurence Olivier. Grimes designed the posters for the film.
- Caesar and Cleopatra (1945); directed by Gabriel Pascal. Grimes was the sketch artist.
- Carnival (1946); directed by Stanley Haynes. Draughtsman.
- Temptation Harbour (1946); directed by Lance Comfort. Sketch artist.
- Vice Versa (1948); directed by Peter Ustinov. Draughtsman.
- Trottie True (1948); directed by Brian Desmond Hurst
- Cardboard Cavalier (1949); directed by Walter Forde. Draughtsman.
- The Rocking Horse Winner (1949); directed by Anthony Pelissier. Draughtsman.
- Give Us This Day (1949); directed by Edward Dmytryk
- The Story of Robin Hood (1952); directed by Ken Annakin. Sketch artist.
- Moulin Rouge (1952); directed by John Huston. Grimes copied Toulouse-Lautrec paintings and posters used in the film.
- Crimson Pirate (1952); directed by Robert Siodmak. Set-up/sketch artist. Travelled to Ischia on location.
- Rob Roy, the Highland Rogue (1953); directed by Harold French. Provided the set-up/continuity sketches.
- The Sword and the Rose (1953); directed by Ken Annakin. Provided the set-up/continuity sketches.
- The Million Pound Note (1954); directed by Ronald Neame. Sketch artist.
- The Black Knight (1954); directed by Tay Garnett. Sketch artist.
- Attila (1954); directed by Pietro Francisci. Supplied special effects and matte shots.
- Svengali (1954); directed by Noel Langley. Grimes copied the paintings of Hildegard Neff.
- The Bespoke Overcoat (1956, short); directed by Jack Clayton.
- The Iron Petticoat (1956); directed by Ralph Thomas.
- Moby Dick (1956); directed by John Huston. Grimes was the assistant art director – his first screen credit. The art director was Ralph Brinton

== Work as art director or production designer ==
- Heaven Knows, Mr Allison (1957); directed by John Huston. Locations in Tobago.
- The Roots of Heaven (1958); directed by John Huston. Location: Democratic Republic of Congo, Chad.
- The Unforgiven (1959); directed by John Huston. Locations: Durango, Mexico.
- The Boy and the Bridge (1959); directed by Kevin McClory. Grimes was not credited as art director, but was involved in the film. Locations: Tower Bridge, Bermondsey.
- The Misfits (1961); directed by John Huston. Labour unions in the United States required that the film have an American art director – so Grimes shared the credit with William Newberry. Locations: Nevada (near Reno and Dayton).
- Lawrence of Arabia (1962); directed by David Lean. Grimes made some contributions to the art direction but was not credited. John Box was the production designer.
- Freud (1962); directed by John Huston. Locations: Vienna, Munich, London.
- The List of Adrian Messenger (1963); directed by John Huston. Locations: Ireland, London.
- The Chalk Garden (1964); directed by Ronald Neame. Location: Sussex. Carmen Dillon was the art director, Grimes associate art director.
- The Night of the Iguana (1964); directed by John Huston. Locations: Puerto Vallarta, Mexico.
- The Bible (1966); directed by John Huston. Locations: Rome, Sicily, Sardinia and Egypt.
- This Property Is Condemned (1966); directed by Sydney Pollack.
- Reflections in a Golden Eye (1967); directed by John Huston. Grimes also undertook second unit direction. The prints were specially treated so that the colour appeared washed out and sepia toned. Location: Rome.
- Sinful Davey (1969); directed by John Huston. Location: Ireland.
- A Walk With Love and Death (1969); directed by John Huston. Locations: Austria and Italy.
- Ryan's Daughter (1970); directed by David Lean. Locations: Dingle Peninsula, Ireland.
- The Way We Were (1973); directed by Sydney Pollack.
- The Yakuza (1974); directed by Sydney Pollack. Location: Japan. Grimes also undertook second unit direction.
- Three Days of the Condor (1975); directed by Sydney Pollack. Locations: New York City, New Jersey, Washington D.C.
- Independence (1976); directed by John Huston. A 28-minute short made for the American Bicentennial Celebrations.
- Murder by Death (1976); directed by Robert Moore.
- Bobby Deerfield (1977); directed by Sydney Pollack. Grimes also did second unit direction. Locations: France, Italy, Switzerland.
- Straight Time (1978); directed by Ulu Grosbard.
- The Electric Horseman (1979); directed by Sydney Pollack. Locations: American West and Las Vegas.
- Urban Cowboy (1980); directed by James Bridges.
- True Confessions (1981); directed by Ulu Grosbard.
- On Golden Pond (1981); directed by Mark Rydell. Location: New Hampshire. Grimes also undertook second unit direction.
- Never Say Never Again (1983); directed by Irvin Kershner.
- Krull (1983); directed by Peter Yates. Locations: Italy, Pinewood Studios.
- The Dresser (1983); directed by Peter Yates.
- Out of Africa (1985); directed by Sydney Pollack. Location: Kenya.
- The Dead (1987); directed by John Huston. Locations: mostly shot in an industrial warehouse in Los Angeles. 2nd unit filming took place in Dublin.
- Haunted Summer (1988); directed by Ivan Passer. Location: Italy.

=== Unrealised or unfinished projects ===
- Typee (1955) - to have been directed by John Huston. Grimes did pre-production work and went on a trip to Tahiti with Huston to scout locations.
- The Man Who Would Be King (1956) – to have been directed by John Huston. Grimes went on a location trip with Huston to Afghanistan, making many preparatory sketches. In the early 1960s both men also collaborated on a revised script. This long-time cherished project of Huston's was originally to have starred Humphrey Bogart and Clark Gable, but only in 1975 did he finally make the film, with Sean Connery and Michael Caine in the lead roles. Alexandre Trauner was the production designer, as Grimes was not available by this time.
- A Farewell to Arms (1957); directed by Charles Vidor. Huston began directing this film but soon left. Grimes stayed on as associate art director but also didn’t complete it. David O. Selznick was the producer.
- Red, White and Zero (1967) – a portmanteau film which was shelved, with sections directed by Peter Brook, Lindsay Anderson and Tony Richardson.
- The Madwoman of Chaillot (1969); directed by Bryan Forbes. The film was begun by John Huston, but he eventually left the production and took Grimes with him.
- The Last Run (1971); directed by Richard Fleischer. The film was started by John Huston with Grimes as art director, but Huston walked off and Grimes left too. Locations: Spain, Portugal.
- The Bounty (1978). An unrealised project, to have been directed by David Lean. Grimes undertook preparatory work. The film was eventually made by Roger Donaldson in 1984.
- Rain Man (1988), directed by Barry Levinson. Grimes provided preliminary work for the film, which was originally to have been directed by Sydney Pollack. After Levinson took over Ida Random was hired as production designer.
- The King's Whore (1990), directed by Axel Corti. Grimes was working on the preliminary sketches for this film at the time of his death.

== Awards ==
Grimes won an Academy Award for Best Art Direction, and was nominated for two more:

Won

- Out of Africa (1985)

Nominated

- The Night of the Iguana (1964)
- The Way We Were (1973)

== See also ==
- Art Directors Guild Hall of Fame
