= Oona Grimes =

British artist and lecturer (born 1957)

Oona Grimes RA
- Born: 1957 (age 68–69); London, England
- Education: Norwich School of Art; Slade School of Fine Art
- Known for: Painting, drawing
- Spouse: Tony Grisoni
- Father: Stephen B. Grimes
- Relatives: Teresa Grimes (sister)
- Elected: Royal Academy of Arts (2023)

Oona Grimes RA (born 1957) is a British artist and visiting lecturer.

== Biography ==
Oona Grimes grew-up in Notting Hill Gate, West London, and attended Holland Park Comprehensive. She is the daughter of the production designer and art director Stephen B. Grimes. She studied at Norwich School of Art from 1982 to 1986 and the Slade School of Fine Art between 1986 and 1988. She lives in Hackney, London, with her partner Tony Grisoni. Grimes has been a visiting lecturer at the Slade, the Ruskin School of Art in Oxford and at the University of the Arts London.

Her sister, Teresa Grimes (born July 1954) is a filmmaker, writer and art gallery director, who co-founded Tintype Gallery (2010–20), Essex Road, in 2010, becoming its sole director in 2014.

In December 2023, Oona Grimes was elected to the Royal Academy of Arts in London.

== Artwork and exhibitions ==
Grimes draws, etches, paints and has made animations and films.

In 2018 Grimes was the recipient of a Bridget Riley fellowship.

Her themes have included Sigmund Freud and John Dee. She has worked with Iain Sinclair.

Exhibitions have included Uncanny Tales (2005), Hail the new Etruscan #2 (2018) and A Way of Seeing (2020).

Works by Grimes are held in the New Hall Art Collection, the British Museum and the New York Public Library.

== Bibliography ==
- Uncanny Tales (2005, catalogue)
