= Brothers of the Head =

- Brothers of the Head movie poster
- Directed by: Keith Fulton; Louis Pepe
- Written by: Brian Aldiss (novel); Tony Grisoni (screenplay)
- Produced by: Simon Channing Williams
- Starring: Harry Treadaway; Luke Treadaway
- Cinematography: Anthony Dod Mantle
- Edited by: Nicolas Gaster
- Music by: Clive Langer
- Production company: Film4
- Distributed by: Tartan Films
- Release dates: 10 September 2005 (Toronto International Film Festival); 6 October 2006 (United Kingdom)
- Running time: 93 minutes
- Country: United Kingdom
- Language: English
- Box office: $84,425

Brothers of the Head is a 2005 mockumentary featuring the story of Tom and Barry Howe (Harry and Luke Treadaway respectively), conjoined twins living in the United Kingdom. It was based on the 1977 novel of the same name by science fiction writer Brian Aldiss.

Tony Grisoni started working on the screenplay in 1984. He met the directors when they were filming Lost in La Mancha about the making of The Man Who Killed Don Quixote.

== Plot ==
In the early 1970s, the twins are essentially purchased by a sleazy talent manager with plans to turn them into rock stars. The brothers form a pub rock band called the Bang Bang. As the band's success grows, a music journalist, Laura (Tania Emery), follows the band writing an article. A romantic relationship develops between Laura and Tom, causing friction between the two brothers.

== Cast ==
- Luke Treadaway as Barry Howe
- Harry Treadaway as Tom Howe
- Sean Harris as Nick Sidney
- Bryan Dick as Paul Day
- Tania Emery as Laura Ashwood
- Jonathan Pryce as Henry Couling
- Jane Horrocks as Roberta Howe
- Howard Attfield as Zak Bedderwick
- Ken Russell as himself
- James Greene as Brian Aldiss
- Luke Wagner as Young Zak
