= Dreaming of Joseph Lees =

1999 British romantic drama film by Eric Styles

- Directed by: Eric Styles
- Written by: Catherine Linstrum
- Produced by: Christopher Milburn
- Starring: Samantha Morton; Lee Ross; Rupert Graves
- Cinematography: Jimmy Dibling
- Edited by: Caroline Limmer
- Music by: Zbigniew Preisner
- Distributed by: Fox Searchlight Pictures
- Release date: November 26, 1999
- Running time: 80 minutes (Slamdance Film Festival); 92 minutes (USA release)
- Language: English
- Box office: $12,044

Dreaming of Joseph Lees is a 1999 British romantic drama film directed by Eric Styles and starring Rupert Graves, Samantha Morton and Nicholas Woodeson. It is an adaptation of a story written by Catherine Linstrum set in rural England in the late 1950s. The film was distributed by the Fox Entertainment Group. Samantha Morton's performance in the film won the Evening Standard Award British Film Award for Best Actress.

== Synopsis ==
Set in rural England in the 1950s Eva (Samantha Morton) fantasises about her handsome, worldly cousin Joseph Lees (Rupert Graves), with whom she fell in love as a girl. However, stuck in a closed community she becomes the object of someone else's fantasy, Harry (Lee Ross). When Harry learns that Eva is planning to leave the village in order to live with and look after the injured Lees, he devises a gruesome scheme in order to force her to stay and look after him.

== Cast ==
- Rupert Graves as Joseph Lees
- Samantha Morton as Eva
- Nicholas Woodeson as Mr. Dian
- Lee Ross as Harry
- Felix Billson as Robert
- Lauren Richardson as Janie
- Frank Finlay as father
- Vernon Dobtcheff as Italian Doctor
- Miriam Margolyes as Signora Caldoni
- Holly Aird as Maria
- Freddy Douglas as Danny (as Freddie Douglas)
