= Tony Grisoni =

British screenwriter

- Born: London, England
- Occupation: Screenwriter
- Spouse: Oona Grimes
- Website: www.tonygrisoni.co.uk

Tony Grisoni is a British screenwriter. His first feature film, Queen of Hearts, directed by Jon Amiel, won the Grand Prix at the 1990 Festival du Film de Paris.

== Life and career ==
He has co-written several of director Terry Gilliam's films, including Fear and Loathing in Las Vegas and Tideland. Gilliam and Grisoni went to WGA arbitration to get credit for Fear and Loathing; initially only Tod Davies and Alex Cox (who had written a previous version of the screenplay) were credited, despite Gilliam and Grisoni rewriting the entire film from scratch. In the end, all four writers were credited. Later, Gilliam and Grisoni were involved in a similar dispute when original writer Ehren Kruger received sole credit for The Brothers Grimm; as an alternative to receiving a writing credit, Gilliam and Grisoni listed themselves as "dress pattern makers".

Grisoni also co-wrote the screenplay for Gilliam's The Man Who Killed Don Quixote, which was abandoned soon after starting filming. During the production, he met filmmakers Keith Fulton and Louis Pepe, who were shooting the making-of documentary that later became Lost in La Mancha. Fulton and Pepe went on to film Brian Aldiss's novella Brothers of the Head (2006), from a screenplay by Grisoni that he had started working on as far back as 1984.

In 2008, Grisoni directed his first short film, Kingsland #1: The Dreamer, for which he was nominated for a BAFTA.

Grisoni wrote Red Riding (2009), an adaptation of David Peace's quartet of novels based on the events surrounding the Yorkshire Ripper murders. For budgetary reasons, only three films were produced, with the second of the four novels (1977) left unmade. He also co-wrote the screenplay for Samantha Morton's directorial debut The Unloved (2009), which won the BAFTA TV Award for Best Single Drama.

The Man Who Killed Don Quixote was finally released in 2018, featuring a character named Toby Grisoni.

He teaches Screenwriting at the London Film School. His partner is artist Oona Grimes.

== Filmography ==
- Queen of Hearts (1989)
- The Island on Bird Street (1997)
- Fear and Loathing in Las Vegas (1998)
- In This World (2002)
- The Brothers Grimm (2005) (uncredited)
- Tideland (2005)
- Brothers of the Head (2005)
- Death Defying Acts (2007)
- Red Riding (2009)
- The Unloved (2009)
- Southcliffe (2013)
- How I Live Now (2013)
- The Young Pope (2016)
- Electric Dreams episode "Crazy Diamond" (2017)
- The City and the City (2018)
- The Man Who Killed Don Quixote (2018)
- Marlow (2024)
