= Strong Language (film) =

- Directed by: Simon Rumley
- Written by: Simon Rumley
- Produced by: Simon Rumley; Alex Tate
- Cinematography: Armando Smit
- Edited by: Sasha Austen; Rick Moore; Simon Rumley
- Music by: David Conway; Laurence Elliot-Potter
- Production company: Rumleyvision
- Release date: 28 January 2000
- Running time: 76 minutes
- Country: United Kingdom
- Language: English

Strong Language is a 2000 British mockumentary film directed by Simon Rumley. The film was Rumley's directorial debut.

== Cast ==
- Ricci Harnett as Nathan
- Kelly Marcel as Phillipa
- Tania Emery as Zoe
- Julie Rice as Tatty
- Thomas Dyton as Boy Racer Triton
- Robyn Lewis as Corrie
- Stuart Laing as Mark
- Shireen Abdel-Moneim as Hayley
- Al Nedjari as Peter
- Paul Tonkinson as Danny
- Ruth Purser as Jane
- Charles De'Ath as Stuart
- Elaine Britten as Jo
- Chris Pavlo as Tony
- Kate Allenby as Lydia
- Colin Warren as Colin
- David Groves as The Narrator

== Release ==
The film was released in the United Kingdom on 28 January 2000.

== Reception ==
Philip French of The Observer wrote that the film is "of considerable promise", and is "worth looking out for." Time Out called the film a "cheeky, amusing and intriguing faux vox-pop which very cleverly laces together some 16 interviews to camera from a varied range of London twenty-somethings." Derek Elley of Variety called the film a "clever idea that doesn’t overstay its welcome but is surprisingly conventional beneath the surface."

Peter Bradshaw of The Guardian wrote that while the performances are "variable to say the least", and "a lot of the self-admiring Cool Britannia stuff, like the earnest disquisitions on the subject of Damon from Blur, look excruciatingly naff and dated three years on", the film "has got pace, and an elegant and disturbing clinch at the end." William Thomas of Empire rated the film 3 stars out of 5, wrote that while the film "suffers slightly in its abundance of characters", the script is "observant and witty", the cast is "engaging and enthusiastic", and the direction is "highly promising".
