= 65th Golden Globe Awards =

Film award ceremony in 2008

- Date: January 14, 2008
- Site: Beverly Hilton Hotel; Beverly Hills, Los Angeles, California

Highlights
- Best Film: Drama: Atonement
- Best Film: Musical or Comedy: Sweeney Todd: The Demon Barber of Fleet Street
- Best Drama Series: Mad Men
- Best Musical or Comedy Series: Extras
- Best Miniseries or Television movie: Longford
- Most awards: (2) Atonement; No Country for Old Men; Sweeney Todd: The Demon Barber of Fleet Street; The Diving Bell and the Butterfly
- Most nominations: (7) Atonement

The 65th Golden Globe Awards, honoring the best in film and television of 2007, were presented by the Hollywood Foreign Press Association on January 14, 2008.

Due to threats of boycotts and picketing of the event due to the then-ongoing Writers Guild of America strike, the traditional awards ceremony did not take place; instead, the winners were announced during a press conference at The Beverly Hilton that was open to all media outlets. The ceremony's usual broadcaster NBC carried alternate programming hosted by Billy Bush and Nancy O'Dell of Access Hollywood, including an hour-long results special.

The nominees were announced on December 13, 2007. The television film Longford was the most-awarded, with three awards including Best Miniseries or Television Movie. The film Atonement entered the Golden Globes with the most nominations, and won the awards for best drama film and original score. It was tied for the most-awarded film with The Diving Bell and the Butterfly (best foreign language film, and best director for Julian Schnabel), No Country for Old Men (best screenplay, and best performance by a supporting actor for Javier Bardem), and Sweeney Todd (winner of best musical or comedy film, and best performance in a musical or comedy film for Johnny Depp) — which all received two.

== Ceremony cancellation ==
The Association attempted to reach an interim agreement with the Writers Guild to allow its members to write for the ceremonies. When a compromise fell through, striking writers threatened to picket the event; almost all of the celebrities planning to attend, including members of the Screen Actors Guild who pledged their support for the strike, promised to boycott the ceremony rather than cross the picket lines. On January 8, 2008, the HFPA chose to cancel the ceremony, and replace it with a press conference at the Beverly Hilton Hotel, held on January 13, 2008, at 6:00 p.m. PT.

NBC initially announced plans to be the exclusive broadcaster of the press conference, with its coverage hosted by Billy Bush and Nancy O'Dell of the NBC-syndicated entertainment news program Access Hollywood. However, the network balked after Dick Clark Productions—who normally produces the ceremony and telecast—reportedly demanded that the network pay an additional "license fee" between $1.5 and $2 million for the privilege. DCP defended the allegations, having stated that it was inappropriate for NBC to hold "an exclusive three-hour broadcast special disguised as a news conference that would bar all other media" without paying the HFPA and DCP a "nominal license fee". There were also reports that NBC came into conflicts with the HFPA over the presentation of the event, centering upon the involvement of Access Hollywood.

Due to the conflict, the HFPA took full control over the press conference, and announced that it would not impose any restrictions on who may televise it. E! and TV Guide Network—two cable channels known for their red carpet coverage during awards season—both carried the press conference, but also reduced the extent of their overall coverage due to the lack of ceremony. TV Guide Network aired a two-hour pre-show and a one-hour post-show, anchored by Chris Harrison and Maria Sansone from the network's studio, as opposed to its traditional red carpet coverage hosted by Lisa Rinna and Joey Fatone. E! did not broadcast Live from the Red Carpet at all, and scheduled a marathon of Keeping Up with the Kardashians with a break for live coverage of the press conference.

NBC did not air the official, 32-minute press conference, and instead presented the results over the course of an hour-long NBC News special hosted by Bush and O'Dell from the Access Hollywood studio. The results program was preceded by a two-hour Dateline special hosted by Matt Lauer, Going for Gold, which featured interviews with nominees, and guest predictions from comedian Kathy Griffin, and Tiki Barber, Jerome Bettis, and Cris Collinsworth of Football Night in America. The results show was followed by an Access Hollywood special, where Bush and O'Dell visited the venues of the cancelled after-parties.

Rob Owen of the Pittsburgh Post-Gazette felt that NBC's resulting programming was an "over-produced mess", and that one could have learned the results quicker by watching the roughly half-hour press conference on CNN, E!, or TV Guide Network instead (as opposed to NBC's hour-long program with commercial breaks, whose results were increasingly delayed from the actual announcements). He also noted that TV Guide Network's pre-show had a stronger focus on the impact of the WGA strike on the show and the entertainment industry. By contrast, Owen described the aforementioned Dateline special as "sort of a long, drawn-out 'Barbara Walters Special' without the soft-focus, tears or 'What kind of a tree would you be?' questions", and sarcastically acknowledged its inclusion of analysis from the "noted film critics" of the Football Night in America panel.

== Winners and nominees ==
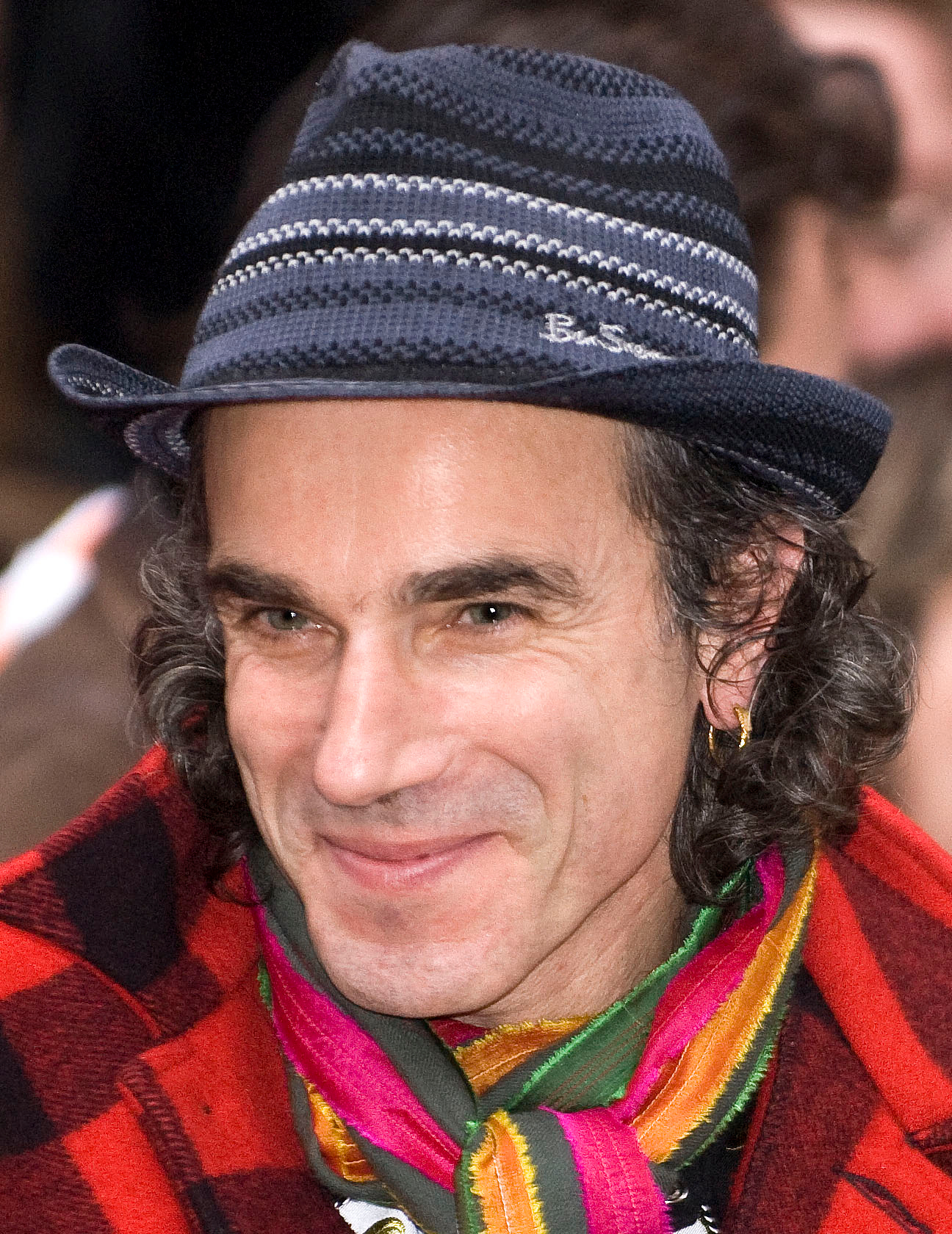
Daniel Day-Lewis, Best Actor in a Motion Picture – Drama winner

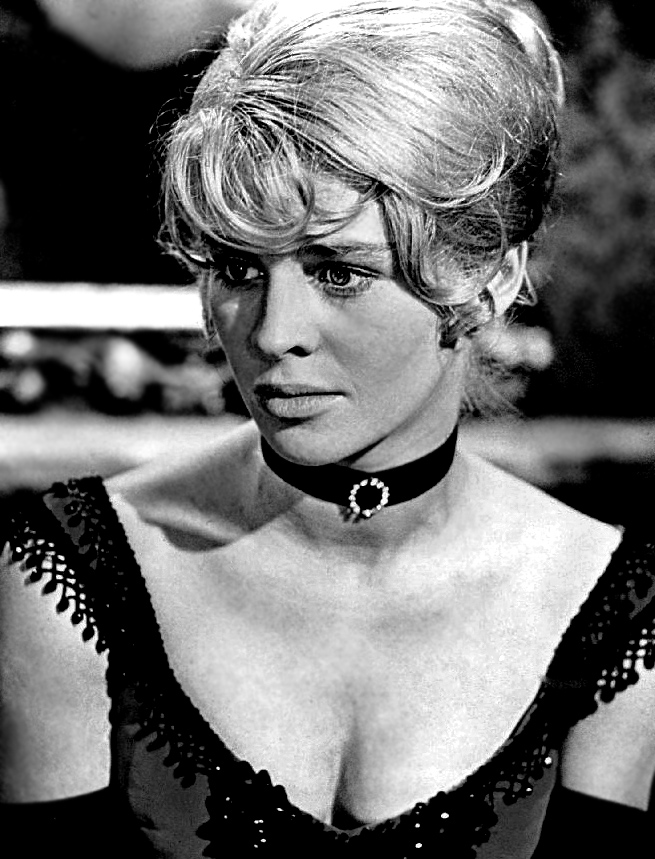
Julie Christie, Best Actress in a Motion Picture – Drama winner

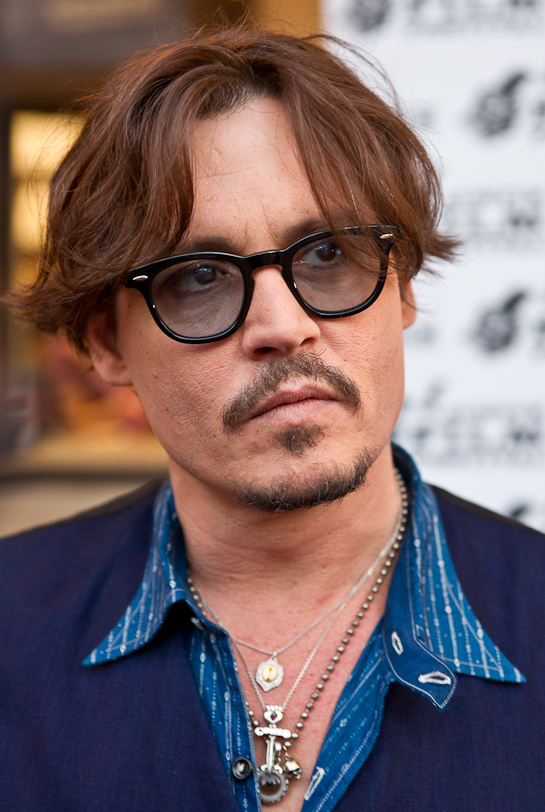
Johnny Depp, Best Actor in a Motion Picture – Musical or Comedy winner

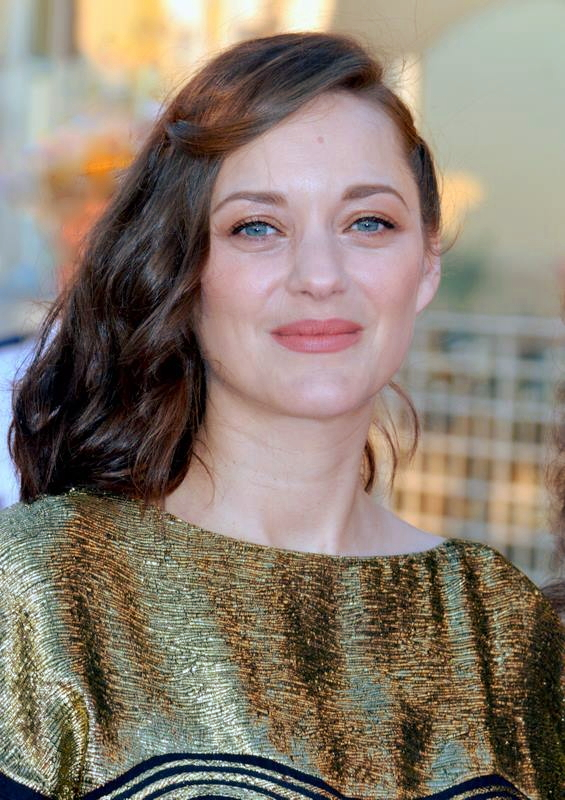
Marion Cotillard, Best Actress in a Motion Picture – Musical or Comedy winner

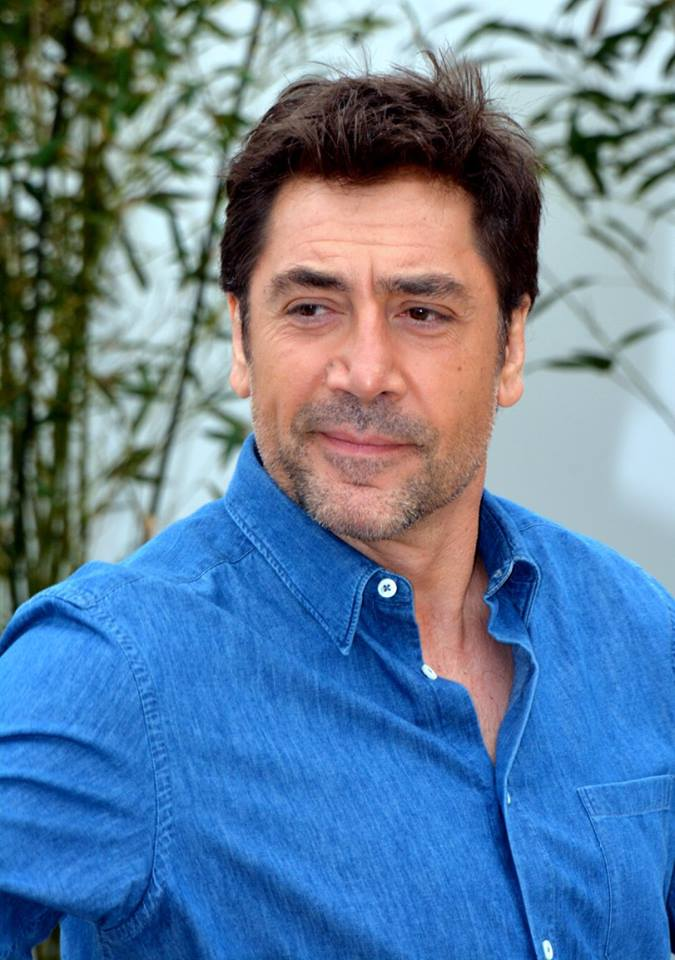
Javier Bardem, Best Supporting Actor winner

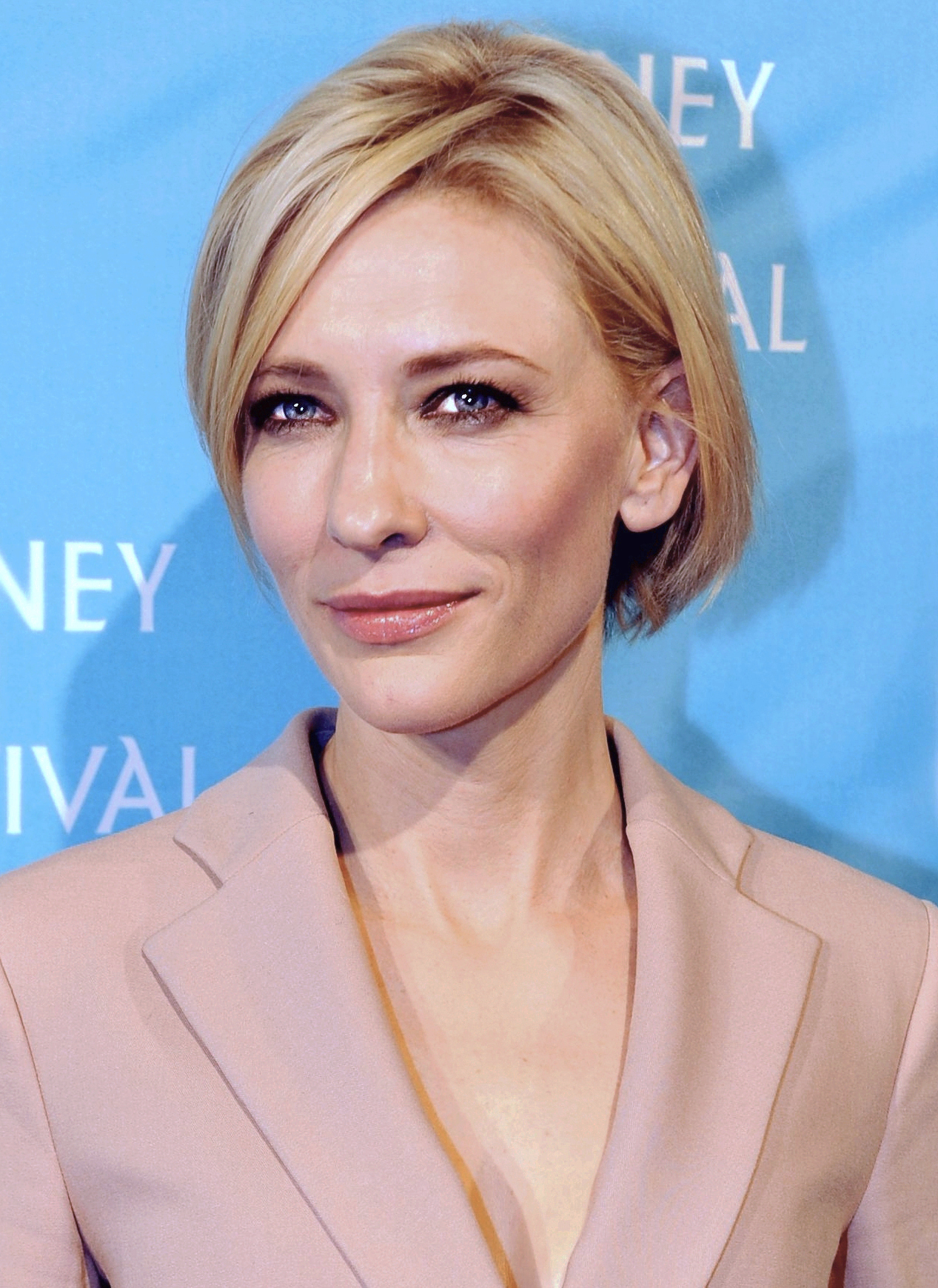
Cate Blanchett, Best Supporting Actress winner

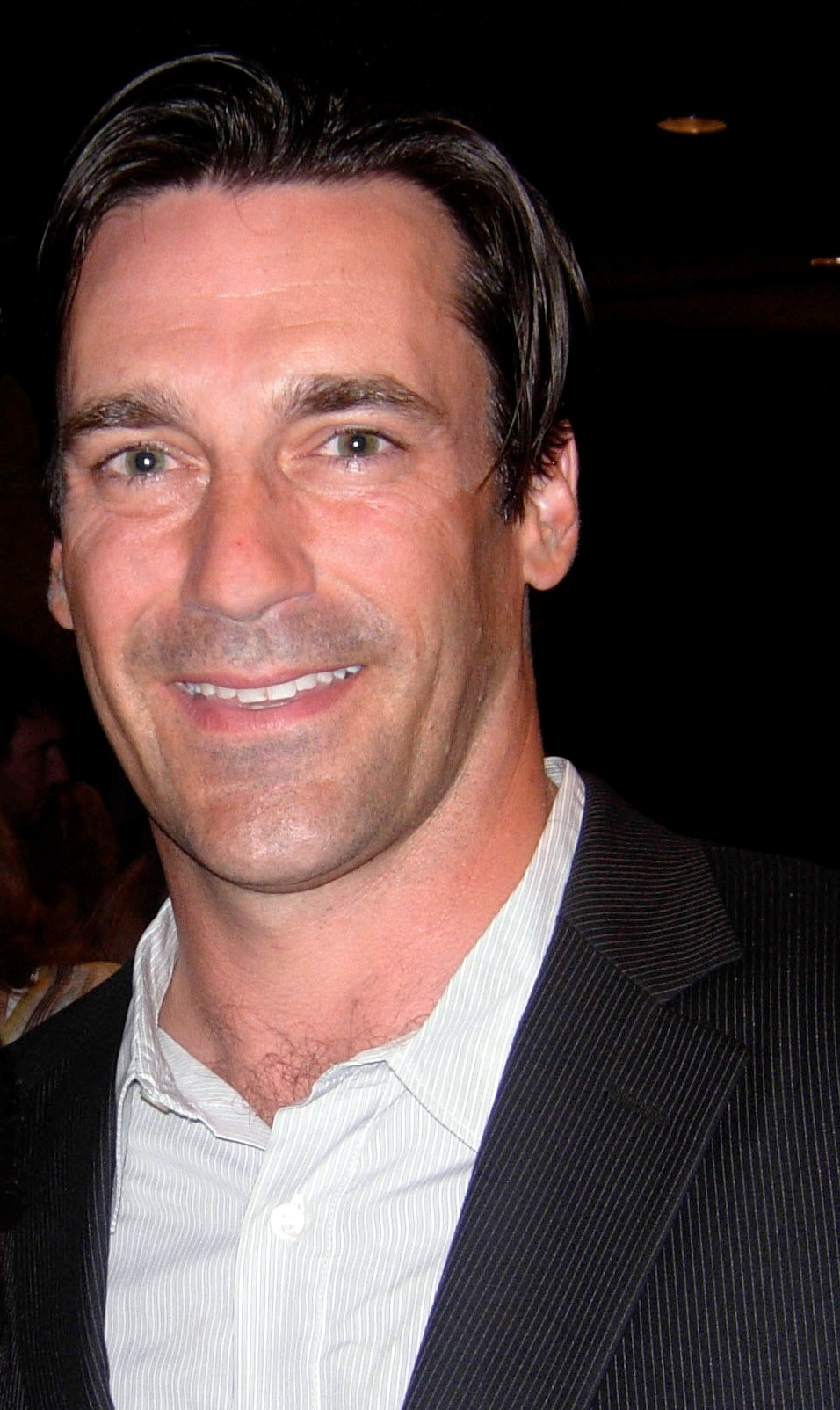
Jon Hamm, Best Actor in a Television Series – Drama winner

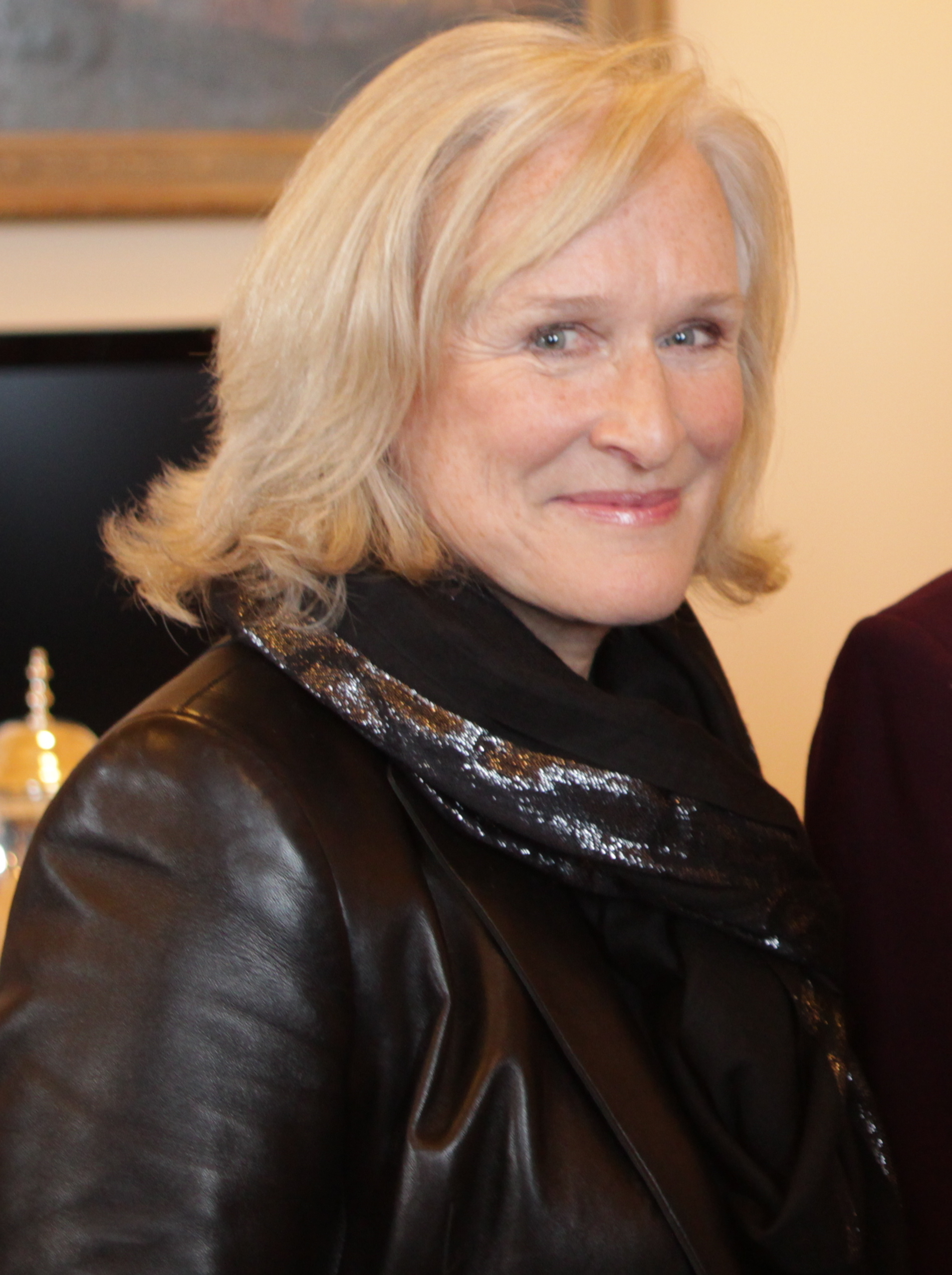
Glenn Close, Best Actress in a Television Series – Drama winner

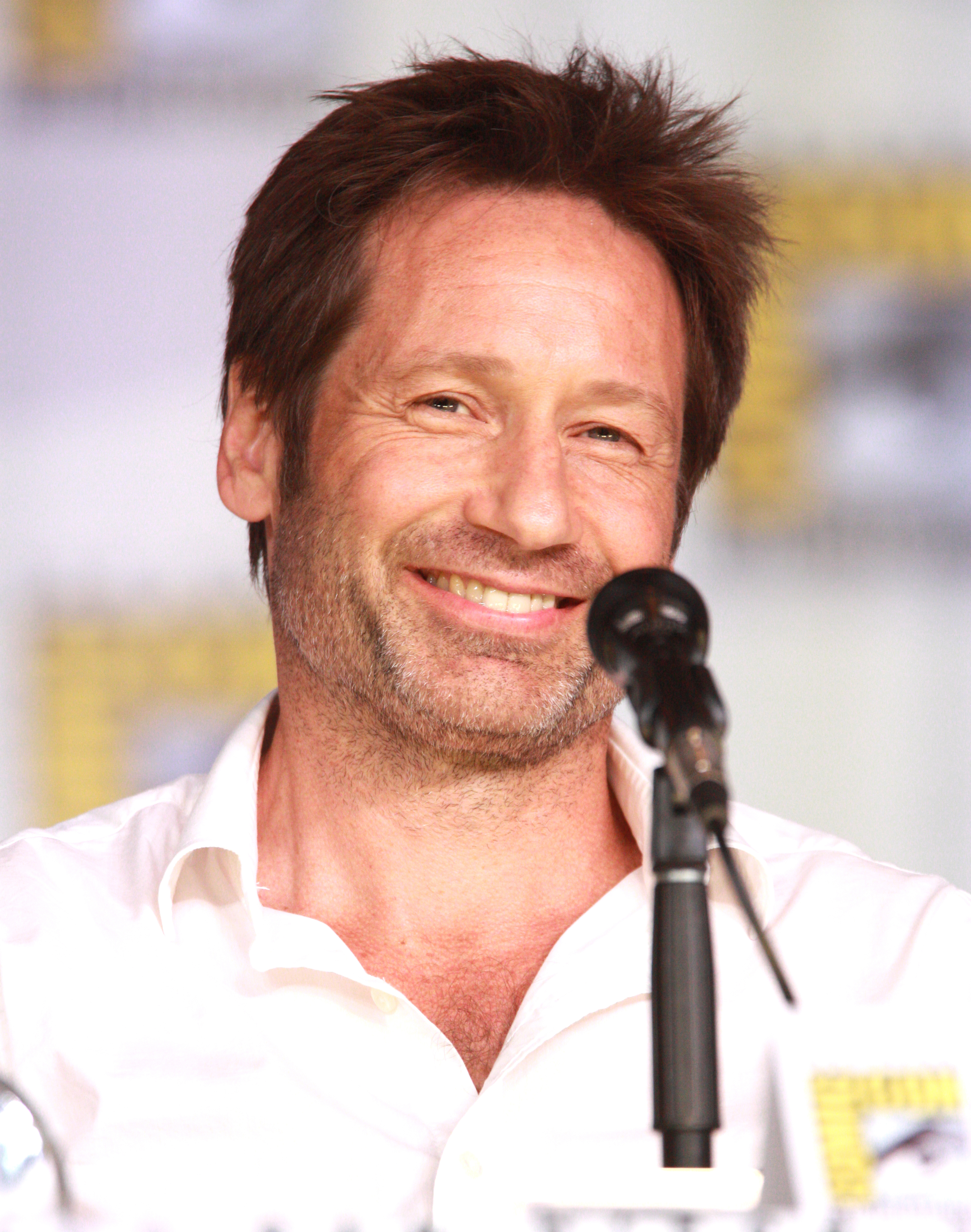
David Duchovny, Best Actor in a Television Series – Musical or Comedy winner

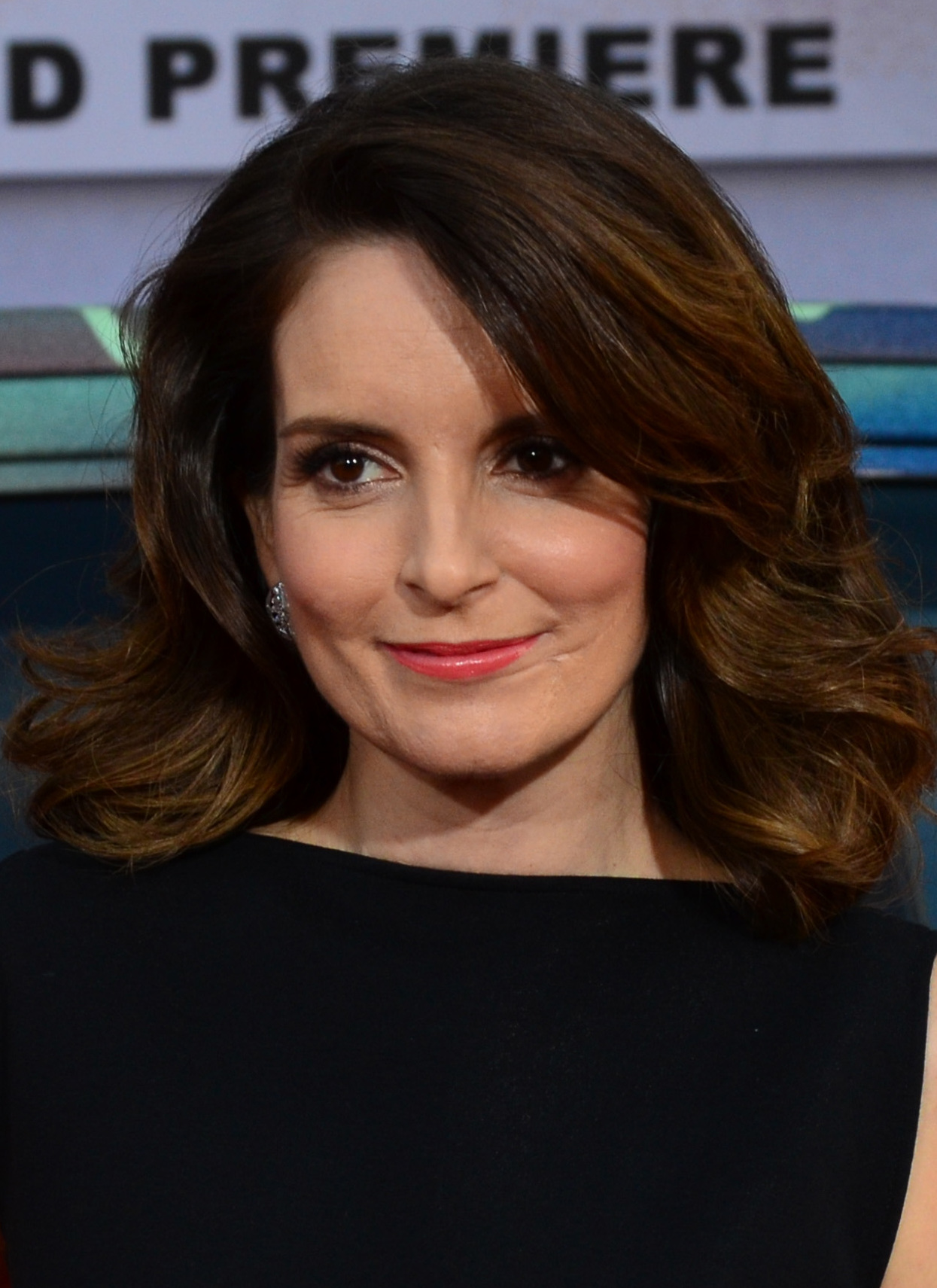
Tina Fey, Best Actress in a Television Series – Musical or Comedy winner

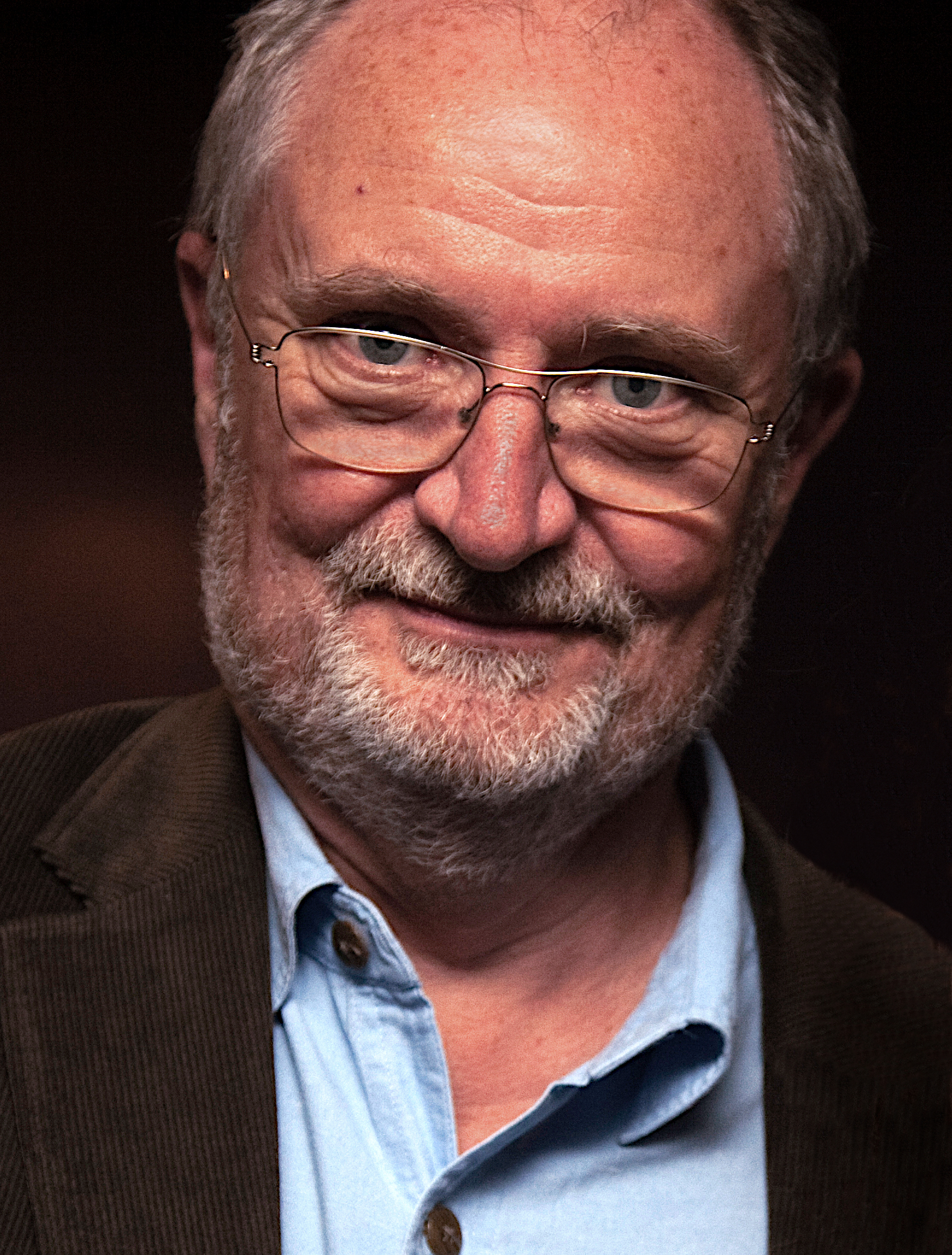
Jim Broadbent, Best Actor in a Miniseries or Television Film winner

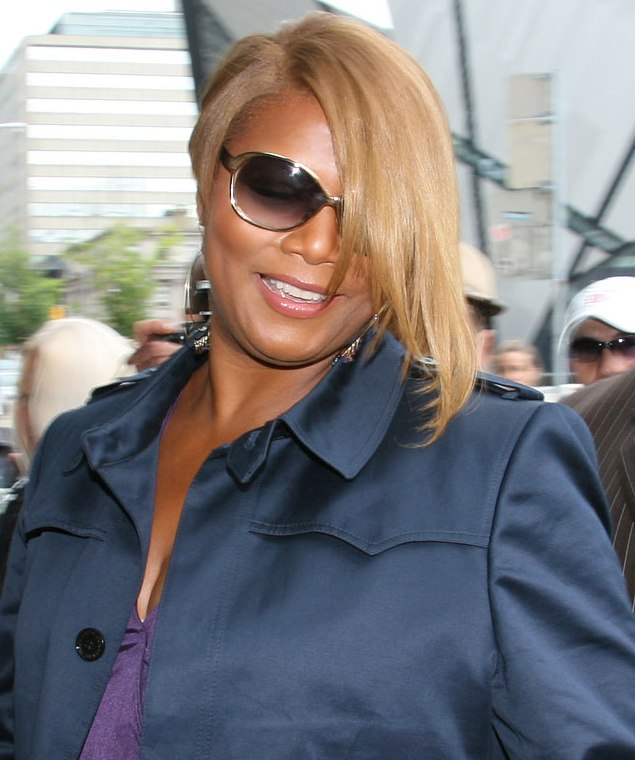
Queen Latifah, Best Actress in a Miniseries or Television Film winner

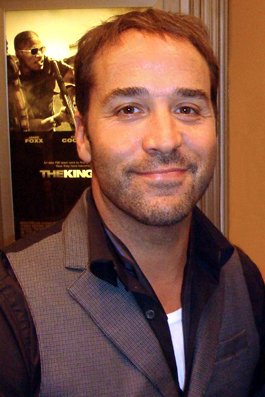
Jeremy Piven, Best Supporting Actor in a Series, Miniseries, or Television Film winner

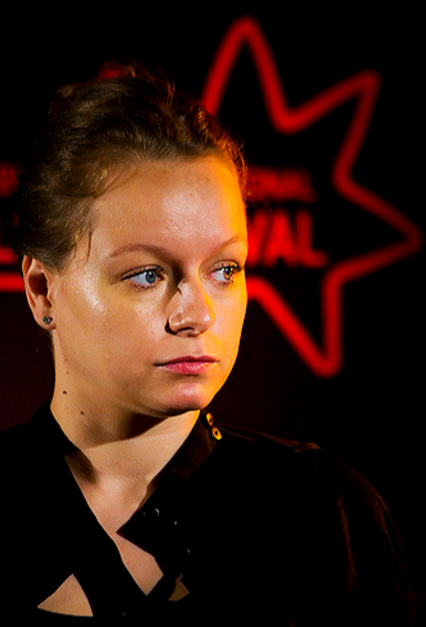
Samantha Morton, Best Supporting Actress in a Series, Miniseries, or Television Film winner

These are the nominees for the 65th Golden Globe Awards. Winners are listed at the top of each list.

=== Film ===
Best Motion Picture
Drama	Musical or Comedy
Atonement; American Gangster; Eastern Promises; The Great Debaters; Michael Clayton; No Country for Old Men; There Will Be Blood	Sweeney Todd: The Demon Barber of Fleet Street; Across the Universe; Charlie Wilson's War; Hairspray; Juno
Best Performance by an Actor in a Motion Picture – Drama	Best Performance by an Actress in a Motion Picture – Drama
Daniel Day-Lewis – There Will Be Blood as Daniel Plainview; George Clooney – Michael Clayton as Michael Clayton; James McAvoy – Atonement as Robbie Turner; Viggo Mortensen – Eastern Promises as Nikolai Luzhin; Denzel Washington – American Gangster as Frank Lucas	Julie Christie – Away from Her as Fiona Anderson; Cate Blanchett – Elizabeth: The Golden Age as Elizabeth I of England; Jodie Foster – The Brave One as Erica Bain; Angelina Jolie – A Mighty Heart as Mariane Pearl; Keira Knightley – Atonement as Cecilia Tallis
Best Performance by an Actor in a Motion Picture – Musical or Comedy	Best Performance by an Actress in a Motion Picture – Musical or Comedy
Johnny Depp – Sweeney Todd: The Demon Barber of Fleet Street as Benjamin Barker / Sweeney Todd; Ryan Gosling – Lars and the Real Girl as Lars Lindstrom; Tom Hanks – Charlie Wilson's War as Congressman Charlie Wilson; Philip Seymour Hoffman – The Savages as Jon Savage; John C. Reilly – Walk Hard: The Dewey Cox Story as Dewford "Dewey" Cox	Marion Cotillard – La Vie en Rose as Édith Piaf; Amy Adams – Enchanted as Giselle; Nikki Blonsky – Hairspray as Tracy Edna Turnblad; Helena Bonham Carter – Sweeney Todd: The Demon Barber of Fleet Street as Mrs. Nellie Lovett; Elliot Page – Juno as Juno MacGuff
Best Performance by an Actor in a Supporting Role in a Motion Picture	Best Performance by an Actress in a Supporting Role in a Motion Picture
Javier Bardem – No Country for Old Men as Anton Chigurh; Casey Affleck – The Assassination of Jesse James by the Coward Robert Ford as Robert Ford; Philip Seymour Hoffman – Charlie Wilson's War as Gust Avrakotos; John Travolta – Hairspray as Edna Turnblad; Tom Wilkinson – Michael Clayton as Arthur Edens	Cate Blanchett – I'm Not There as Jude Quinn; Julia Roberts – Charlie Wilson's War as Joanne Herring; Saoirse Ronan – Atonement as Briony Tallis; Amy Ryan – Gone Baby Gone as Helene McCready; Tilda Swinton – Michael Clayton as Karen Crowder
Best Director – Motion Picture	Best Screenplay – Motion Picture
Julian Schnabel, The Diving Bell and the Butterfly; Tim Burton, Sweeney Todd: The Demon Barber of Fleet Street; Joel Coen and Ethan Coen, No Country for Old Men; Ridley Scott, American Gangster; Joe Wright, Atonement	Joel Coen and Ethan Coen, No Country for Old Men; Diablo Cody, Juno; Christopher Hampton, Atonement; Ronald Harwood, The Diving Bell and the Butterfly; Aaron Sorkin, Charlie Wilson's War
Best Original Song – Motion Picture	Best Original Score – Motion Picture
"Guaranteed" (performed by Eddie Vedder) from Into the Wild; "Despedida" (performed by Shakira) from Love in the Time of Cholera; "Grace Is Gone" (performed by Jamie Cullum) from Grace Is Gone; "That's How You Know" (performed by Amy Adams) from Enchanted; "Walk Hard" (performed by John C. Reilly) from Walk Hard: The Dewey Cox Story	Dario Marianelli, Atonement; Michael Brook, Kaki King, Eddie Vedder, Into the Wild; Clint Eastwood, Grace Is Gone; Alberto Iglesias, The Kite Runner; Howard Shore, Eastern Promises
Best Foreign Language Film	Best Animated Feature Film
The Diving Bell and the Butterfly; France and U.S.; 4 Months, 3 Weeks and 2 Days; Romania; The Kite Runner; U.S.; Lust, Caution; Taiwan; Persepolis; France	Ratatouille; Bee Movie; The Simpsons Movie

=== Television ===
Best Television Series
Drama	Musical or Comedy
Mad Men (AMC); Big Love (HBO); Damages (FX); Grey's Anatomy (ABC); House (Fox); The Tudors (Showtime)	Extras (HBO); 30 Rock (NBC); Californication (Showtime); Entourage (HBO); Pushing Daisies (ABC)
Best Performance in a Television Series – Drama
Actor	Actress
Jon Hamm – Mad Men (AMC) as Don Draper; Michael C. Hall – Dexter (Showtime) as Dexter Morgan; Hugh Laurie – House (Fox) as Dr. Gregory House; Bill Paxton – Big Love (HBO) as Bill Henrickson; Jonathan Rhys Meyers – The Tudors (Showtime) as Henry VIII of England	Glenn Close – Damages (FX) as Patty Hewes; Patricia Arquette – Medium (NBC) as Allison DuBois; Minnie Driver – The Riches (FX) as Dahlia Malloy; Edie Falco – The Sopranos (HBO) as Carmela Soprano; Sally Field – Brothers & Sisters (ABC) as Nora Walker; Holly Hunter – Saving Grace (TNT) as Grace Hanadarko; Kyra Sedgwick – The Closer (TNT) as Brenda Leigh Johnson
Best Performance in a Television Series – Musical or Comedy
Actor	Actress
David Duchovny – Californication (Showtime) as Hank Moody; Alec Baldwin – 30 Rock (NBC) as Jack Donaghy; Steve Carell – The Office (NBC) as Michael Scott; Ricky Gervais – Extras (HBO) as Andy Millman; Lee Pace – Pushing Daisies (ABC) as Ned	Tina Fey – 30 Rock (NBC) as Liz Lemon; Christina Applegate – Samantha Who? (ABC) as Samantha "Sam" Newly; America Ferrera – Ugly Betty (ABC) as Betty Suarez; Anna Friel – Pushing Daisies (ABC) as Chuck Charles; Mary-Louise Parker – Weeds (Showtime) as Nancy Botwin
Best Performance in a Miniseries or Television Film
Actor	Actress
Jim Broadbent – Longford (HBO) as Lord Longford; Adam Beach – Bury My Heart at Wounded Knee (HBO) as Charles Eastman; Ernest Borgnine – A Grandpa for Christmas (Hallmark Channel) as Bert O'Riley; Jason Isaacs – The State Within (BBC America) as Sir Mark Brydon; James Nesbitt – Jekyll (BBC America) as Dr. Tom Jackman	Queen Latifah – Life Support (HBO) as Ana Wallace; Bryce Dallas Howard – As You Like It (HBO) as Rosalind; Debra Messing – The Starter Wife (USA Network) as Molly Kagan; Sissy Spacek – Pictures of Hollis Woods (CBS) as Josie Cahill; Ruth Wilson – Jane Eyre (PBS) as Jane Eyre
Best Supporting Performance in a Series, Miniseries or Television Film
Supporting Actor	Supporting Actress
Jeremy Piven – Entourage (HBO) as Ari Gold; Ted Danson – Damages (FX) as Arthur Frobisher; Kevin Dillon – Entourage (HBO) as Johnny "Drama" Chase; Andy Serkis – Longford (HBO) as Ian Brady; William Shatner – Boston Legal (ABC) as Denny Crane; Donald Sutherland – Dirty Sexy Money (ABC) as Patrick "Tripp" Darling III	Samantha Morton – Longford (HBO) as Myra Hindley; Rose Byrne – Damages (FX) as Ellen Parsons; Rachel Griffiths – Brothers & Sisters (ABC) as Sarah Walker; Katherine Heigl – Grey's Anatomy (ABC) as Dr. Izzie Stevens; Anna Paquin – Bury My Heart at Wounded Knee (HBO) as Elaine Goodale; Jaime Pressly – My Name Is Earl (NBC) as Joy Turner
Best Miniseries or Television Film
Longford (HBO); Bury My Heart at Wounded Knee (HBO); The Company (TNT); Five Days (HBO); The State Within (BBC America)

== Award breakdown ==
The following films and programs received multiple nominations:

=== Film ===
Nominations	Film
7	Atonement
5	Charlie Wilson's War
4	Michael Clayton
4	No Country for Old Men
4	Sweeney Todd: The Demon Barber of Fleet Street
3	American Gangster
3	Eastern Promises
3	Hairspray
3	Juno
3	The Diving Bell and the Butterfly
2	Grace Is Gone
2	Into the Wild
2	The Kite Runner
2	There Will Be Blood
2	Walk Hard: The Dewey Cox Story
2	Enchanted

=== Television ===
Nominations	Series
4	Damages
4	Longford
3	30 Rock
3	Bury My Heart a Wounded Knee
3	Entourage
3	Pushing Daises
2	Big Love
2	Brothers & Sisters
2	Californication
2	Extras
2	Grey's Anatomy
2	House
2	Mad Men
2	The State Within
2	The Tudors

The following films and programs received multiple wins:

=== Film ===
Wins	Film
2	Atonement
2	No Country for Old Men
2	Sweeney Todd: The Demon Barber of Fleet Street
2	The Diving Bell and the Butterfly

=== Television ===
Wins	Series
3	Longford
2	Mad Men

== See also ==
- 80th Academy Awards
- 28th Golden Raspberry Awards
- 14th Screen Actors Guild Awards
- 59th Primetime Emmy Awards
- 60th Primetime Emmy Awards
- 61st British Academy Film Awards
- 62nd Tony Awards
- 2007 in film
- 2007 in American television
