= Longford (film) =

2006 British television film

- Poster for United States release
- Genre: Biography; Crime drama
- Written by: Peter Morgan
- Directed by: Tom Hooper
- Starring: Jim Broadbent; Samantha Morton; Lindsay Duncan; Andy Serkis
- Music by: Rob Lane
- Country of origin: United Kingdom
- Original language: English

Production
- Executive producers: Andy Harries; Peter Morgan
- Producer: Helen Flint
- Cinematography: Danny Cohen
- Editor: Melanie Oliver
- Running time: 88 minutes
- Production company: Granada Productions

Original release
- Network: Channel 4
- Release: 26 October 2006

Longford is a 2006 British biographical crime drama television film directed by Tom Hooper and written by Peter Morgan. The film centres on Labour Party peer Lord Longford and his campaign for the parole of Moors Murderer Myra Hindley. It was produced by Granada Productions for Channel 4, in association with HBO, and stars Jim Broadbent and Samantha Morton. The film was first broadcast on Channel 4 on 26 October 2006 and was an Official Selection at the 2007 Sundance Film Festival. Broadbent won the British Academy Television Award and a Golden Globe for his role.

Longford and Hindley had both died by the time the film was made; Longford in August 2001 and Hindley in November 2002. Hindley's lover and accomplice, Ian Brady, played by Andy Serkis, was still living at the time of release.

== Plot ==
The film begins in 1987 when penal reform campaigner Lord Longford is invited by a radio host to discuss his new book Saints, with the radio host inviting listeners to call in and join in with the conversation about the new book. Instead, Longford finds himself being challenged by a man who berates him for campaigning for Myra Hindley's release from prison, particularly as she has recently confessed to another two killings which had remained unsolved for more than twenty years. Longford declines to talk about Hindley, as he had made it clear that he would not be discussing her on this particular programme. He gives the same response when another caller questions whether he regrets having supported Hindley for so long now that he knows she stayed silent for so long about the two additional murders, and other facts about the case which Hindley had only recently revealed.

The story itself begins during the late 1960s (during the first premiership of Harold Wilson) at the House of Lords, with Lord Longford, a regular prison visitor, presiding over a reception for a number of ex-convicts he had visited and corresponded with during their imprisonment, including one who is now a successful artist and another who has forged a career in motor engineering. He then receives a letter from one of the most notorious criminals in Britain, Myra Hindley, who has recently been sentenced to life imprisonment for her role in the widely reported Moors murders, which involved the murder of two children and a teenager.

When he visits her, she asks for books, but also for him to arrange for her to meet Ian Brady, her former partner who is equally serving a life sentence for having committed three murders. Longford is shocked and tells her that it would be in her own best interests to have no contact with Brady, as it might harm any future chances of parole. Hindley seems equally shocked at the idea that she would ever be considered for parole. Longford then begins his campaign for Hindley to be paroled, reminding her that the trial judge had felt that rehabilitation and the chance of eventual parole would be possible for Hindley once removed from the influence of Brady.

The question remains of whether Hindley is indeed reformed, for example, in her decision to convert to Longford's own Roman Catholic faith, or whether she is merely manipulating him and feigning her rehabilitation in an attempt to boost her chances of parole. Longford's friendship with Hindley is soon uncovered by the tabloid media, and Longford soon receives a letter from Brady, requesting a prison visit from him.

He visits Brady twice; on both occasions, Brady tells him that Hindley is manipulative and that he should turn his back on her, as she is only interested in winning release from prison and will do or say anything to boost her chances of gaining parole.

Longford, driven by his deep religious belief that all people are ultimately good and can be reformed if they have sinned, decides to continue on his course, despite heavy criticism from the public, tabloid media, politicians and even from his own family. His own wife advises him to find another cause to pursue for his family's good as well as his own, before eventually deciding to support his campaign for Hindley's parole.

In 1977, he appears on the very first episode of Brass Tacks, a current affairs programme, in which he takes part in a debate on the issue of whether Myra Hindley should be given parole. Longford argues that Hindley has repented and had merely acted as Brady's accomplice under duress but is faced with an argument against Hindley's parole from Ann West (the mother of Moors Murders victim Lesley Ann Downey), who feels that Hindley should never be given parole, and vows to kill her if she is ever released. Patrick Kilbride, the father of one of the other victims, John Kilbride appears on the program via telephone and also threatens to kill Hindley if she is ever released.

Ann West was at the centre of a campaign to ensure that Hindley was never released, and gave regular newspaper and television interviews to argue against any suggestion of parole for Hindley, and on many occasions vowed to kill her if she was ever set free. Ann died in February 1999, shortly after Hindley's unsuccessful second appeal against a Home Office ruling to keep her in prison for the rest of her life. Her media campaign to keep Hindley was also actively supported by John Kilbride’s parents and brother. Longford often condemned the media, particularly The Sun newspaper, for their "exploitation" of Ann West.

By 1986, Hindley is about to have her case for parole assessed by the Parole Board and appears to stand a good chance of parole in the near future, but Longford visits her in prison and she reveals that she and Brady were responsible for two further murders. She later helps police locate the body of one of the victims.

Even as Hindley's revelations spark yet more public hostility towards Longford, he remains loyal to Hindley in public and continues to back her campaign for release, even though Hindley herself had told him at an earlier meeting that the campaign he conducted on her behalf may have done her more harm than good, and that she would understand if he decided not to visit her again. He continues to defend Hindley and campaign for her release. He does so during a radio interview regarding a book he has had published in the late 1980s, during which a number of callers berate Longford for his support of Myra Hindley, and demand to know whether he regrets his campaigning now that new facts have emerged. He initially declines to talk about Hindley, but finally agrees to discuss her when the radio host questions him, but insists that he does not regret having supported Hindley and that his friendship with her has enriched his life.

Privately, he is depicted as being affected by doubts, particularly when he listens to the audio tape recording of Lesley Ann Downey being abused during the minutes leading up to her death.

He is last seen visiting Hindley in the grounds of her medium security prison in the late 1990s, by which time he is frail and aged over 90. Hindley is now in her late fifties and her own health is deteriorating, and it appears unlikely that she will live for longer than a few more years.

As the film ends and just before the credits start to roll, an on-screen message states that Longford died in August 2001, while Hindley died in November 2002, having never won parole.

== Cast ==
- Jim Broadbent as Lord Longford
- Samantha Morton as Myra Hindley
- Lindsay Duncan as Lady Elizabeth Longford
- Tam Dean Burn as Roy
- Robert Pugh as Harold Wilson
- Anton Rodgers as William Whitelaw
- Kate Miles as Rachel Pakenham
- Lee Boardman as Radio Talk Show Host
- Andy Serkis as Ian Brady
- Roy Barber as Father Kahle
- Alex Blake as Paddy Pakenham

== Awards and nominations ==
Year	Award	Category	Nominee(s)	Result	Ref.
2007	British Academy Television Awards	Best Single Drama	Peter Morgan, Tom Hooper, Helen Flint, and Andy Harries	Nominated	
2007	British Academy Television Awards	Best Actor	Jim Broadbent	Won	
2007	British Academy Television Awards	Best Actor	Andy Serkis	Nominated	
2007	British Academy Television Awards	Best Actress	Samantha Morton	Nominated	
2007	British Academy Television Craft Awards	Best Director	Tom Hooper	Nominated	
2007	British Academy Television Craft Awards	Best Writer	Peter Morgan	Won	
2007	British Academy Television Craft Awards	Best Editing – Fiction/Entertainment	Melanie Oliver	Won	
2007	British Academy Television Craft Awards	Best Photography and Lighting – Fiction	Danny Cohen	Nominated	
2007	British Academy Television Craft Awards	Best Production Design	Michael Pickwoad	Nominated	
2007	Broadcasting Press Guild Awards	Best Single Drama		Won	
2007	Broadcasting Press Guild Awards	Best Actor	Jim Broadbent	Won	
2007	Broadcasting Press Guild Awards	Best Actress	Samantha Morton	Nominated	
2007	Broadcasting Press Guild Awards	Writer's Award	Peter Morgan	Nominated	
2007	Golden Nymph Awards	Best Direction – Television Film	Tom Hooper	Won	
2007	Golden Nymph Awards	Best Script – Television Film	Peter Morgan	Won	
2007	Golden Nymph Awards	Outstanding Actor – Television Film	Jim Broadbent	Nominated	
2007	Golden Nymph Awards	Outstanding Actor – Television Film	Andy Serkis	Nominated	
2007	Golden Nymph Awards	Outstanding Actress – Television Film	Lindsay Duncan	Nominated	
2007	Golden Nymph Awards	Outstanding Actress – Television Film	Samantha Morton	Nominated	
2007	Humanitas Prize	90 Minute or Longer Network or Syndicated Television	Peter Morgan	Won	
2007	Online Film & Television Association Awards	Best Motion Picture		Nominated	
2007	Online Film & Television Association Awards	Best Actor in a Motion Picture or Miniseries	Jim Broadbent	Nominated	
2007	Online Film & Television Association Awards	Best Costume Design in a Motion Picture or Miniseries		Nominated	
2007	Online Film & Television Association Awards	Best Music in a Motion Picture or Miniseries		Nominated	
2007	Primetime Emmy Awards	Outstanding Made for Television Movie	Peter Morgan, Andy Harries, and Helen Flint	Nominated	
2007	Primetime Emmy Awards	Outstanding Lead Actor in a Miniseries or a Movie	Jim Broadbent	Nominated	
2007	Primetime Emmy Awards	Outstanding Supporting Actress in a Miniseries or a Movie	Samantha Morton	Nominated	
2007	Primetime Creative Arts Emmy Awards	Outstanding Costumes for a Miniseries, Movie or a Special	James Keast and Sarah Moore	Nominated	
2007	Primetime Creative Arts Emmy Awards	Outstanding Music Composition for a Miniseries, Movie or a Special (Original Dramatic Score)	Rob Lane	Nominated	
2007	Royal Television Society Awards	Best Single Drama		Nominated	
2007	Royal Television Society Awards	Best Actor (Male)	Jim Broadbent	Nominated	
2007	Royal Television Society Awards	Best Writer (Drama)	Peter Morgan	Won	
2007	Satellite Awards	Best Motion Picture Made for Television		Nominated	
2007	Satellite Awards	Best Actor in a Miniseries or Motion Picture Made for Television	Jim Broadbent	Nominated	
2007	Satellite Awards	Best Actress in a Miniseries or Motion Picture Made for Television	Samantha Morton	Won	
2007	Satellite Awards	Best Actor in a Supporting Role in a Series, Miniseries or Motion Picture Made for Television	Andy Serkis	Nominated	
2007	Writers' Guild of Great Britain Awards	Best Original TV Drama	Peter Morgan	Nominated	
2008	American Film Institute Awards	Top 10 Television Programs		Won	
2008	Golden Globe Awards	Best Miniseries or Television Film		Won	
2008	Golden Globe Awards	Best Actor – Miniseries or Television Film	Jim Broadbent	Won	
2008	Golden Globe Awards	Best Supporting Actor – Series, Miniseries or Television Film	Andy Serkis	Nominated	
2008	Golden Globe Awards	Best Supporting Actress – Series, Miniseries or Television Film	Samantha Morton	Won	
