= Pandaemonium (film) =

2000 film by Julien Temple

- Directed by: Julien Temple
- Written by: Frank Cottrell Boyce
- Produced by: Nick O'Hagan
- Starring: Linus Roache; John Hannah; Samantha Morton
- Cinematography: John Lynch
- Edited by: Niven Howie
- Music by: Dario Marianelli
- Distributed by: Optimum Releasing
- Release dates: 15 September 2000 (Toronto Film Festival); 14 September 2001 (United Kingdom)
- Running time: 125 minutes
- Country: United Kingdom
- Language: English
- Budget: $15 million
- Box office: $17,113

Pandaemonium is a 2000 film, directed by Julien Temple, screenplay by Frank Cottrell Boyce. It is based on the early lives of English poets Samuel Taylor Coleridge and William Wordsworth, in particular their collaboration on the Lyrical Ballads (1798), and Coleridge's writing of Kubla Khan (completed in 1797, published in 1816).

Much of the film was shot on location on and around the Quantock Hills in Somerset.

== Plot ==
The fictionalized friendship of two Romantic era poets, Samuel Taylor Coleridge and William Wordsworth.

== Cast ==
- Linus Roache as Samuel Taylor Coleridge
- John Hannah as William Wordsworth
- Samantha Morton as Sara Fricker Coleridge (Coleridge's wife)
- Emily Woof as Dorothy Wordsworth
- Samuel West as Robert Southey
- Andy Serkis as John Thelwall
- Andrea Lowe as Edith Southey
- Clive Merrison as Dr. Gillman

== Reception ==
=== Release dates ===
- 15 September 2000, Toronto International Film Festival (Premiere)
- 31 January 2001, Gothenburg Film Festival
- 14 September 2001, United Kingdom
- 23 October 2001, Bergen International Film Festival
- 14 July 2005, Australia

=== Accolades ===
| Award | Category | Recipients and nominees | Outcome |
|---|---|---|---|
| British Independent Film Award | Best Actress | Samantha Morton | Nominated |
| Emden International Film Festival | Emden Film Award | Julien Temple | Won |
| Evening Standard British Film Awards | Best Actor | Linus Roache | Won |

== Critical reception ==
The Guardian, "It's rattling good stuff. There's just one small objection. None of it ever happened. This is fantasy literary history.”

Variety, "Julien Temple's "Pandaemonium" labors hard to present the leading lights of late 18th-century English poetry as up-to-the-moment sexy bohos."
