= Toronto Film Critics Association Awards 2003 =

Annual Canadian film awards ceremony

7th TFCA Awards

December 17, 2003

Best Film:
Lost in Translation

The 7th Toronto Film Critics Association Awards, honoring the best in film for 2003, were held on 17 December 2003.

== Winners ==
- Best Actor:
  - Bill Murray – Lost in Translation
- Best Actress:
  - Samantha Morton – Morvern Callar
- Best Animated Film:
  - Finding Nemo
- Best Canadian Film:
  - Spider
- Best Director:
  - Peter Jackson – The Lord of the Rings: The Return of the King
- Best Documentary Film:
  - Capturing the Friedmans
- Best Film:
  - Lost in Translation
- Best First Feature:
  - American Splendor
- Best Foreign Language Film:
  - City of God • Brazil/France/United States
- Best Screenplay (tie):
  - The Barbarian Invasions – Denys Arcand
  - Lost in Translation – Sofia Coppola
- Best Supporting Actor:
  - Peter Sarsgaard – Shattered Glass
- Best Supporting Actress:
  - Miranda Richardson – Spider
- Special Citation:
  - Peter Jackson, for his work on the Lord of the Rings trilogy as a whole.
