= Catherine Linstrum =

Catherine Linstrum is a writer and film director who now lives in Wales.

California Dreamin' (Endless), a film which she co-wrote, won the Un Certain Regard Award at the 2007 Cannes Film Festival, and Nadger (2010) won a BAFTA Cymru award for best Short Film in 2011.

== Filmography ==
- Nuclear (2019) (writer/director)
- Things That Fall from the Sky (2016) (writer/director)
- Nadger (2010) (writer/director)
- California Dreamin' (Endless) (2007) (writer)
- Two Families (2007) (writer)
- The Counting House (2006) (writer)
- The Boy with Blue Eyes (2004) (writer/director)
- Dreaming of Joseph Lees (1999) (writer)
- The Black Dog (1999) (writer/director)

=== Television episodes ===
- Primeval (2009) - Episode 3.5 (writer)
