= Under the Skin (1997 film) =

- Theatrical release poster
- Directed by: Carine Adler
- Written by: Carine Adler
- Starring: Samantha Morton; Claire Rushbrook; Matthew Delamere; Rita Tushingham; Christine Tremarco; Stuart Townsend
- Cinematography: Barry Ackroyd
- Edited by: Ewa J. Lind
- Music by: Ilona Sekacz
- Distributed by: British Film Institute
- Release dates: 21 August 1997 (EIFF); 28 November 1997 (United Kingdom)
- Running time: 79 minutes
- Country: United Kingdom
- Language: English
- Budget: $1 million (estimated)
- Box office: $140,254

Under the Skin is a 1997 British drama film written and directed by Carine Adler and starring Samantha Morton and Claire Rushbrook. It tells the story of two sisters coping with the sudden death of their mother. While one sister, Rose, manages to get on with her life, younger sister Iris goes down a self-destructive path in which she loses herself in one-night-stands and anonymous sexual encounters.

Adler based her ideas for the script on forensic psychiatrist Estela V. Welldon's book Mother, Madonna, Whore, which argues that whereas men tend to externalize their grieving processes through anger, women internalize them via paths which can incorporate such extreme reactions as self-harm and promiscuity.

Morton was widely praised for her performance and the film won top critics’ prizes at various film festivals, including the award for Best British Film at the Edinburgh International Film Festival.

== Plot ==
Iris and her older sister Rose are left parentless when their mother dies from a brain tumor. Their father lives in Australia, which he left for ten years ago. 24-year-old Rose, who is married and pregnant, manages to cope with the situation, but 19-year-old Iris dumps her boyfriend Gary and spirals out of control, engaging in risky behaviors. Iris quits her job and moves out of the flat she shared with Gary and into a run-down apartment that she decorates with flowers. The tension is compounded by the siblings’ dynamics, as Iris has always thought Rose to be her mother's "favorite." Among Iris’ behaviors are picking up anonymous men for a string of sexual encounters.

== Cast ==
- Samantha Morton as Iris
- Claire Rushbrook as Rose
- Rita Tushingham as Mum
- Christine Tremarco as Vron
- Stuart Townsend as Tom
- Matthew Delamere as Gary
- Mark Womack as Frank
- Clara Francis as Elena
- Joe Tucker as Sam
- Daniel O’Meara as Max
- Crissy Rock as Compere

== Production ==
Adler's inspiration for the film was the book Mother, Madonna, Whore by psychiatrist Estella Welldon. Welldon also served as a script consultant on the film. Said Adler, "Her theory is that women act out their anger on themselves through various kinds of compulsive behaviour, including sex, while men direct their anger outwards through crime or abuse of women. Women are destructive to themselves and to their bodies, rather than to other people."

== Reception ==
Under the Skin received favorable reviews from critics. Rotten Tomatoes gives the film a score of 90% based on 29 reviews. The critics consensus reads, "Under the Skin brilliantly captures a young woman's emotional collapse -- and marks its star and director as fresh talents worth keeping an eye on."

Marjorie Baumgarten of The Austin Chronicle wrote, "Writer-director Adler handles this potential hothouse atmosphere with graceful restraint and evocatively expressionist touches", adding she "does a remarkable job of conveying the kind of anguished soul sickness that is at a loss for words or conventional expression. The movie only falters as it brings all this pained discontent to peaceful resolution…Under the Skin, however, well lives up to its name."

Critics roundly praised Morton's performance. Janet Maslin of The New York Times wrote, Morton "embodies the role with furious intensity and with a raw yet waifish presence", and Kevin Thomas of the Los Angeles Times said she gives a "scorching no-holds-barred, totally selfless portrayal."

Derek Elley of Variety wrote the film has "occasional stumbles", but is otherwise an "impressive, highly involving feature debut" with a "script that juggles complementary moods of anger, tough comedy, the surreal and sex-soaked metaphysics."

Ruthe Stein of The San Francisco Chronicle wrote, "Adler gets so much of the girl stuff right that it is tempting to say this film could only have been written by a woman. There's the frank way Iris and a girlfriend talk about the men they have slept with, adding up their conquests. The sibling rivalry between Iris and Rose accurately captures the sister relationship." Stein added "although Rushbrook has the less showy role, she is as powerful as Morton is, depicting a quieter but no less heartfelt response to grief. In her short time onscreen, Tushingham manages to convey the love this mother has for her daughters and why her death sets them into such a tailspin."

While some female viewers commended Adler for her depiction of female sexuality, others contended it was voyeuristic and bordered on being exploitative. Adler said in response, "I can't control people's reactions, of course. I felt that female sexuality was under-represented on screen and I wanted to explore some of the issues around that."

The Guardian placed the film at number 15 on its list of the Best British Films 1984–2009. It is ranked number 80 in Time Out's list of the 100 best British films.

== Awards ==
Under the Skin won the Michael Powell Award for Best British feature film at the 1997 Edinburgh International Film Festival and the FIPRESCI International Critics' Award at the 1997 Toronto International Film Festival. Carine Adler won the award for Best New Filmmaker at the 1998 Boston Society of Film Critics Awards and was nominated for a BIFA for Best British Director.

Samantha Morton won the award for Best Actress at the Boston Society of Film Critics Awards and was nominated for the BIFA for Best Female Performance in a British Independent Film.
