= Carine Adler =

Brazilian screenwriter and film director

The Right Honourable The Lady Reid of Cardowan
- Born: 1948 (age 77–78); Brazil
- Occupation: Film director
- Years active: 1994–present
- Known for: A female perspective on sexuality
- Notable work: Under the Skin

Carine Adler (born 1948) is a Brazilian screenwriter and film director.

== Career ==
Adler's break came when the British Film Institute asked her to develop her short film Touch and Go into a full-length feature. The result was Under the Skin, the screenplay for which took her two years to write. According to Richard Armstrong in The Rough Guide to Film, "What distinguishes her small oeuvre is the fusion of her protagonists' desire and their sense of inferiority."

== Personal life ==
Adler is the second wife of former British government minister Dr John Reid, Baron Reid, whom she married in 2002. She has a son, Hal, from a previous marriage, and two stepsons with Reid.

== Filmography ==
=== Feature films ===
- Under the Skin - 1997, writer/director. Received the Michael Powell Award for Best British feature film at the 1997 Edinburgh International Film Festival

=== Shorts ===
- Contrechamps - 1979, writer/director
- Pianists - 1980, writer/director
- Jamie - 1982, writer/director. A short film made at the National Film and Television School
- Touch and Go - 1993, writer/director
- Edward's Flying Boat (doc) - 1995, writer/director
- Fever - 1995, writer/director
