= Amy Gilliam =

British film producer (born 1978)

- Born: Amy Rainbow Gilliam; 1978 (age 47–48); London, England
- Citizenship: British
- Education: Central Saint Martins College of Art and Design
- Occupations: Film producer; Filmmaker
- Years active: 1998–present
- Known for: The Brothers Grimm; Tideland; Lost in La Mancha; The Man Who Killed Don Quixote; The Imaginarium of Doctor Parnassus
- Parents: Terry Gilliam; Maggie Weston

Amy Rainbow Gilliam (born 1978) is a British film producer and filmmaker. She is the daughter of filmmaker Terry Gilliam and make-up artist Maggie Weston. She has worked on several of her father's films, such as The Brothers Grimm and Tideland.

== Early life and education ==
Gilliam was born in London and grew up there. She studied graphic design at the Central Saint Martins College of Art and Design.

== Career ==
Gilliam began her career as a costume assistant on Fear and Loathing in Las Vegas (1998). She then worked as a camera trainee on films including The End of the Affair (1999), 102 Dalmatians (2000), Paul McGuigan’s Gangster No. 1 (2000), Chocolat (2000) and Iris (2001). She also served as clapper/loader on the 2000 shoot of The Man Who Killed Don Quixote, and was one of the producers of the documentary Lost in La Mancha (2002), which documented the production's initial failure.

She later joined the assistant director team on Lara Croft Tomb Raider: The Cradle of Life (2003), and worked in the AD department on Young Adam (2003), Harry Potter and the Prisoner of Azkaban (2004) and Sky Captain and the World of Tomorrow (2004). Gilliam also worked as director's assistant on The Brothers Grimm, Tideland (2005) and Blood and Chocolate (2007). She moved into producing with Push (2009), followed by The Imaginarium of Dr. Parnassus (2009), the Italian short fantasy film The Wholly Family (2011), The Zero Theorem (2013) and further attempts to bring The Man Who Killed Don Quixote to the screen.

Gilliam continued to be associated with The Man Who Killed Don Quixote after its earlier failed productions, having first worked in the production office during the abandoned 2000 shoot. She was among the small number of crew members involved in both the early and final versions of the film, and contributed to securing the financing for the completed 2018 production. She was also credited as one of the producers of the completed 2018 film. Amy was 11 years old when her father first began developing the project in the late 1980s. An interview also noted that she encouraged a brief awards‑season publicity effort in Los Angeles after the film's limited release.

In 2022, she served as an executive producer on the drama film Monica, directed by Andrea Pallaoro. Gilliam later was among the producers of the 2024 film Silver Star, directed by Ruben Amar and Lola Bessis. In 2025, she also worked as a producer on Terry Gilliam's biblical comedy Carnival: At the End of Days, which was being developed for the European Film Market in Berlin.

== Involvement with The Imaginarium of Dr. Parnassus ==
Per the Evening Standard, Gilliam became involved in The Imaginarium of Dr. Parnassus from its earliest stages, helping her father develop the project and working with producer William D. "Bill" Vince to secure financing, including arranging Canadian backing by attaching Christopher Plummer to the cast. She also worked on budgeting, scheduling, and on‑set logistics during the London shoot. Her role became central after the unexpected death of Heath Ledger in January 2008: she informed her father of the news, helped handle the immediate situation, joined discussions with financiers to keep the project from being shut down, and supported plans to complete Ledger's role by bringing in Johnny Depp, Jude Law and Colin Farrell. She also helped renegotiate production arrangements so filming could continue and stayed involved throughout the very tight shoot that followed.

A report in The Globe and Mail also described her early involvement, noting that she asked to help produce the film after reading the script and later encouraged the project to continue following Heath Ledger's death.

== Selected filmography ==
Year	Title	Role
2002	Lost in La Mancha	Producer
2005	The Brothers Grimm	Director's assistant
2005	Tideland	Director's assistant
2009	Push	Producer
2009	The Imaginarium of Doctor Parnassus	Producer
2011	The Wholly Family	Producer
2013	The Zero Theorem	Producer
2018	The Man Who Killed Don Quixote	Producer
2022	Monica	Executive producer
2024	Silver Star	Producer
2025	Carnival: At the End of Days	Producer

== Awards and recognition ==
Year	Film	Award / Festival	Result
2009	The Imaginarium of Doctor Parnassus	Academy Awards	Nominated
2009	The Imaginarium of Doctor Parnassus	BAFTA Awards	Nominated
2011	The Wholly Family	European Film Awards	Won (Best Short Film)
2013	The Zero Theorem	Venice Film Festival	Festival premiere
2019	The Man Who Killed Don Quixote	Cannes Film Festival	Closing film
2022	Monica	Venice Film Festival	Arca CinemaGiovani Award

== Personal life ==
In a 2006 interview with The Sunday Times, Terry Gilliam spoke about his daughter Amy's early life, including family travels to France and Egypt, and her later involvement in film. He recalled that she joined the costume department on Fear and Loathing in Las Vegas and subsequently worked as his assistant on The Brothers Grimm.

According to a 2009 interview with The Guardian, Gilliam was 31 when she worked for the first time as a producer on her father's film The Imaginarium of Doctor Parnassus. The article described her as playing a key supportive role during the troubled production, with Terry Gilliam saying that "it was like a mother instinct took over" as she helped the project move forward.
