= List of awards and nominations received by Terry Gilliam =

Terry Gilliam awards and nominations
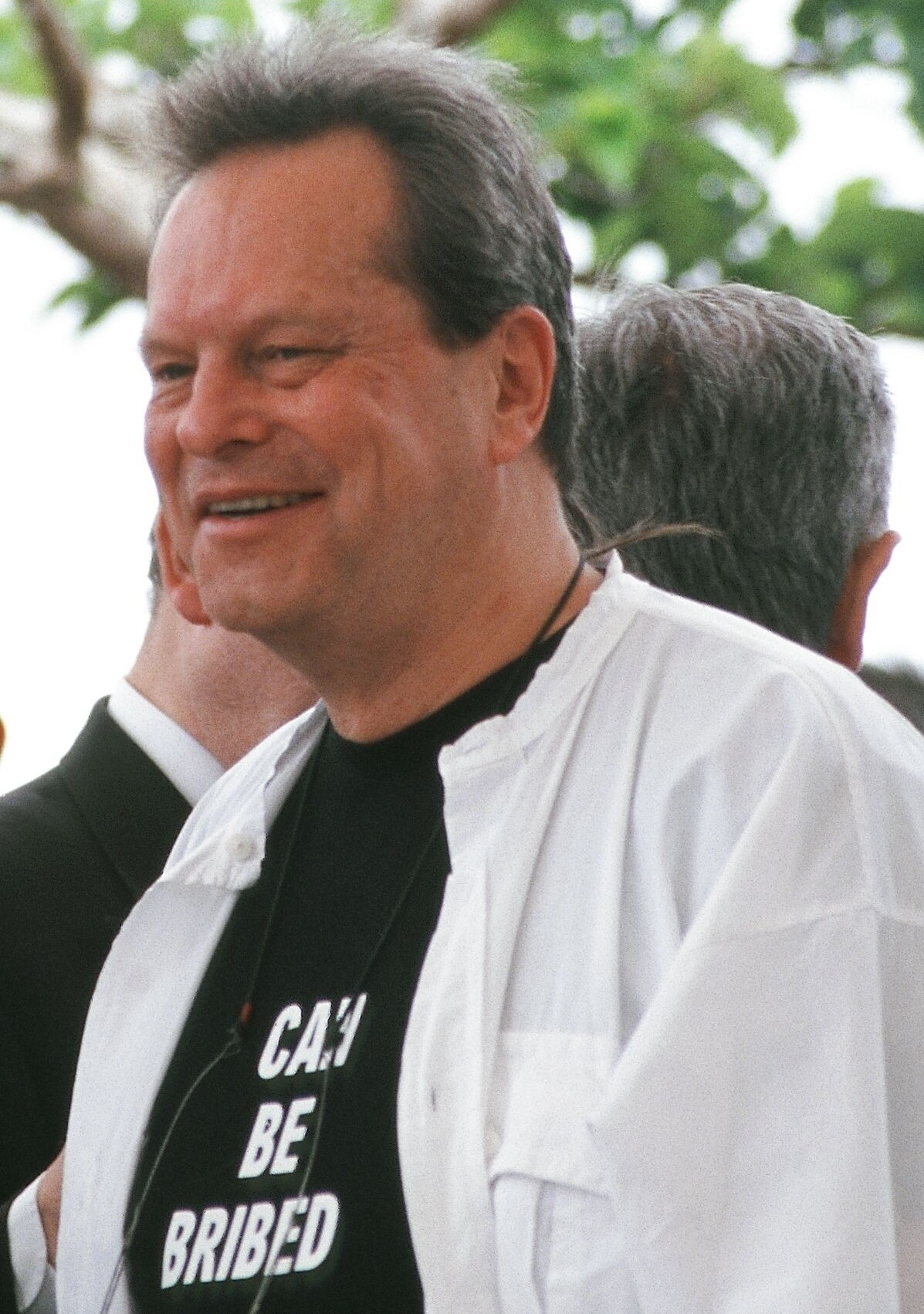
Awards and nominations
Award	Wins	Nominations
Golden Globe	0	1
Academy Awards	0	1
BAFTA Awards	0	1

Terry Gilliam is an American-born British filmmaker, comedian, animator, actor and former member of the Monty Python comedy troupe.

Gilliam has directed 14 feature films, including Time Bandits (1981), Brazil (1985), The Adventures of Baron Munchausen (1988), The Fisher King (1991), 12 Monkeys (1995), Fear and Loathing in Las Vegas (1998), The Imaginarium of Doctor Parnassus (2009), and The Man Who Killed Don Quixote (2018).

He has received nominations for an Academy Award and a Golden Globe Award. Gilliam received the BAFTA Award for Outstanding British Contribution to Cinema in 2009. In 2009, Gilliam received the BAFTA Fellowship for lifetime achievement.

== Major associations ==
=== Academy Awards ===
Year	Category	Nominated work	Result	Ref.
1985	Best Original Screenplay	Brazil	Nominated	

=== BAFTA Awards ===
Year	Category	Nominated work	Result	Ref.
British Academy Film Awards
1983	Best Short Film	The Crimson Permanent Assurance	Nominated	
1988	Outstanding Contribution to Cinema	Monty Python's Flying Circus	Won	
2009	BAFTA Fellowship		Received	

=== Golden Globe Awards ===
Year	Category	Nominated work	Result	Ref.
1991	Best Director	The Fisher King	Nominated	

== Festival awards ==
=== Cannes Film Festival ===
Year	Category	Nominated work	Result	Ref.
1998	Palme d'Or	Fear and Loathing in Las Vegas	Nominated	

=== Venice Film Festival ===
Year	Category	Nominated work	Result	Ref.
1991	Silver Lion	The Fisher King	Won	

== Miscellaneous awards ==
Year	Award	Category	Film	Result	Ref.
1981	Saturn Awards	Best International Film	Time Bandits	Nominated	
1981	Saturn Awards	Best Director	Time Bandits	Nominated	
1981	Saturn Awards	Best Writing	Time Bandits	Nominated	
1985	Los Angeles Film Critics Association	Best Film	Brazil	Won	
1985	Los Angeles Film Critics Association	Director	Brazil	Won	
1985	Los Angeles Film Critics Association	Screenplay	Brazil	Won	
1991	Los Angeles Film Critics Association	Best Picture	The Fisher King	Nominated	
1991	Los Angeles Film Critics Association	Best Director	The Fisher King	Nominated	
1991	Los Angeles Film Critics Association	Best Screenplay	The Fisher King	Nominated	
1991	Toronto International Film Festival	People's Choice Award	The Fisher King	Won	
1991	Saturn Awards	Best Director	The Fisher King	Nominated	
1995	Saturn Awards	Best Director	12 Monkeys	Nominated	
1995	Empire Award	Best Director	12 Monkeys	Won	
2005	San Sebastian Festival	FIPRESCI Prize	Tideland	Won	
2009	British Independent Film Awards	Best Achievement in Production	The Imaginarium of Doctor Parnassus	Nominated	
2018	Magritte Award	Best Foreign Film	The Man Who Killed Don Quixote	Nominated	
2024	The Aardman Slapstick Award for Visual Comedy.	Comedy		Won	

== Honours and special recognition ==
- An asteroid, 9619 Terrygilliam, is named in his honour.
- Terry Gilliam was awarded the Fellowship of the Kermodes, by film critic Mark Kermode.
- Gilliam was honoured with the Director with Unique Visual Sensitivity Award at the Camerimage film festival in Łódź, Poland in 2009.
- He was awarded the Career Achievement Award at the 2007 Imagine Film Festival in Amsterdam, Netherlands.
- Ordre des Arts et des Lettres
  - Knight (2013)
- Raindance Film Festival announced on 13 August 2018, that he would be the next recipient of its Auteur Award for his contribution to UK film.
- Inkpot Award (2009)
