= The Crimson Permanent Assurance =

1983 British film by Terry Gilliam

- Opening titles
- Directed by: Terry Gilliam
- Written by: Terry Gilliam
- Produced by: Terry Gilliam; John Goldstone
- Starring: Sydney Arnold; Guy Bertrand; Andrew Bicknell; John Scott Martin; Leslie Sarony
- Cinematography: Roger Pratt
- Edited by: Julian Doyle
- Music by: John Du Prez
- Production companies: Celandine Films; The Monty Python Partnership
- Distributed by: Universal Pictures
- Release dates: 31 March 1983 (United States); 23 June 1983 (United Kingdom)
- Running time: 16 minutes
- Country: United Kingdom
- Language: English

The Crimson Permanent Assurance is a 1983 British swashbuckling comedy short film directed by Terry Gilliam and starring Sydney Arnold and Guy Bertrand. It plays as the prelude to the film Monty Python's The Meaning of Life (1983).

The film includes actor Matt Frewer's debut performance.

== Plot ==
The elderly employees of the Permanent Assurance Company, a staid London firm which has recently been taken over by the Very Big Corporation of America (VBCA), rebel against their much younger corporate masters when one of them is wrongfully sacked. Having locked the surviving supervisors in the safe as hostages, and forced their boss to walk a makeshift plank out a window, they commandeer their Edwardian office building, which suddenly weighs anchor, uses its scaffolding and tarpaulins as masts, yards and sails, and the stone office building starts to move as if it were a pirate ship. Leaving the City of London, they sail to another financial centre and then attack the VBCA's skyscraper, using - among other things - wooden filing cabinets as carronades, cutlasses fashioned from ceiling fan blades, and stationery spindles as daggers. They swing on ropes into the board room and engage the executives of VBCA in hand-to-hand combat, eventually vanquishing them after a long and drawn out battle.

After their hard-won victory, the clerks celebrate while singing a heroic sea shanty as they once more "sail the wide accountan-sea" in search of further adventures. However, they unceremoniously sail off the edge of the world due to their belief about the shape of the world being "disastrously wrong".

Typical of the way the Pythons weave callback gags into their projects (such as "The Spanish Inquisition" in Flying Circus, or the repeated references to swallows in Holy Grail), The Crimson Permanent Assurance re-emerges in the middle of The Meaning of Life. After the donor scene, the film shifts to a modern boardroom in the VBCA headquarters, where the executives debate the meaning of life. The debate is halted when one executive asks "Has anyone noticed that building there before?", which turns out to be the Crimson Permanent Assurance. As the beginning of the battle between the clerks and the VBCA is repeated, the raid is suddenly halted by a falling skyscraper crushing the Permanent Assurance Company building, accompanied by a voice-over apologizing for the "unwarranted attack by the supporting feature".

== Cast ==
Pirates

- Sydney Arnold
- Myrtle Devenish
- Eric Francis
- Billy John
- Len Marten
- John Scott Martin
- Larry Noble
- Paddy Ryan
- Leslie Sarony
- Wally Thomas
- Douglas Cooper
- George Daly
- Chick Fowles
- Terry Grant
- Robin Hewlett
- Juba Kennerly
- Tony Lang
- Ronald Shilling
- Albert Welch

Very Big Corporation of America

- Guy Bertrand
- Andrew Bicknell
- Ross Davidson
- Matt Frewer
- Peter Mantle
- Peter Merrill
- Camerom Miller
- Gareth Milne
- Eric Stovell
- Jack Armstrong
- Robert Carrick
- Terry Jones
- Graham Chapman
- Eric Idle
- Michael Palin

== Production ==
Having originally conceived the story as a six-minute animated sequence in Monty Python's The Meaning of Life, intended for placement at the end of Part V, Terry Gilliam convinced the other members of Monty Python to allow him to produce and direct it as a live action piece instead. According to Gilliam, the film's rhythm, length, and style of cinematography made it a poor fit as a scene in the larger movie, so it was presented as a supplementary short ahead of the film.

It was a common practice in British cinemas to show an unrelated short feature before the main movie, a holdover from the older practice of showing a full-length B movie ahead of the main feature. By the mid-1970s the short features were of poorer quality (often Public Information Films) or travelogues. The Pythons had already produced one spoof travelogue narrated by John Cleese, Away from It All, which was shown before Life of Brian (1979) in Britain.

== In popular culture ==
The Crimson Permanent Assurance plays a prominent role in Charles Stross's 2013 novel Neptune's Brood, where the CPA is an interstellar insurance company that sponsors space pirates who double as cargo auditors. The CPA also features in the novel's twist ending.
