= Monty Python and the Holy Grail =

1975 British comedy film by Terry Gilliam and Terry Jones

- Theatrical release poster
- Directed by: Terry Gilliam; Terry Jones
- Written by: Graham Chapman; John Cleese; Eric Idle; Terry Gilliam; Terry Jones; Michael Palin
- Produced by: Mark Forstater; Michael White
- Starring: Graham Chapman; John Cleese; Terry Gilliam; Eric Idle; Terry Jones; Michael Palin
- Narrated by: Michael Palin
- Cinematography: Terry Bedford
- Edited by: John Hackney
- Music by: Neil Innes (songs); De Wolfe Music
- Production companies: Python (Monty) Pictures; Michael White Productions; National Film Trustee Company
- Distributed by: EMI Films
- Release date: 3 April 1975
- Running time: 92 minutes
- Country: United Kingdom
- Language: English
- Budget: £282,035
- Box office: £2,358,229 (1975 run) $5,507,090 (rereleases)

Monty Python and the Holy Grail is a 1975 British comedy film based on the Arthurian legend, written and performed by the Monty Python comedy group (Graham Chapman, John Cleese, Terry Gilliam, Eric Idle, Terry Jones, and Michael Palin) and directed by Terry Gilliam and Jones (known as a duo by their differing surnames) in their feature directorial debuts. It was conceived during the hiatus between the third and fourth series of their BBC Television series Monty Python's Flying Circus.

While the group's first film, And Now for Something Completely Different, was a compilation of sketches from the first two television series, Holy Grail is an original story that parodies the legend of King Arthur's quest for the Holy Grail. Thirty years later, Idle used the film as the basis for the 2005 Tony Award–winning musical Spamalot.

Monty Python and the Holy Grail grossed more than any other British film screened in the US in 1975, and has since been considered one of the greatest comedy films of all time. In the US, it was selected in 2011 as the second-best comedy of all time in the ABC special Best in Film: The Greatest Movies of Our Time behind Airplane!. In the UK, readers of Total Film magazine in 2000 ranked it the fifth-greatest comedy film of all time; a similar poll of Channel 4 viewers in 2006 placed it sixth.

== Plot ==
In AD 932, King Arthur and his squire Patsy, who bangs coconut shells together as Arthur mimes riding a horse, travel Britain searching for men to join the Knights of the Round Table. Along the way, Arthur debates whether coconuts could be found in a temperate climate, passes through a town infected with a plague, recounts receiving Excalibur from the Lady of the Lake to two anarcho-syndicalist peasants, and defeats the Black Knight. At an impromptu witch trial, he recruits Sir Bedevere the Wise, later joined by Sir Lancelot the Brave, Sir Galahad the Pure, Sir Robin the Not-Quite-So-Brave-as-Sir-Lancelot, and the aptly named Sir Not-Appearing-in-this-Film, along with their squires and Robin's minstrels. Arthur leads the knights to Camelot, but changes his mind after the knights in the castle perform a musical number, deeming it "a silly place". God then appears and orders Arthur to find the Holy Grail.

Arthur and his knights arrive at a castle occupied by French soldiers, who claim to have the Grail and taunt the Britons, driving them back with a barrage of barnyard animals. Bedevere concocts a plan to sneak in using a Trojan Rabbit, but forgets to tell the others to hide inside it; the Knights are forced to flee when it is flung back at them. Arthur decides the knights should go their separate ways to search for the Grail. Meanwhile, a modern-day historian filming a documentary on the Arthurian legends is killed by an unknown knight on horseback, triggering a police investigation.

Arthur and Bedevere are given directions by an old soothsayer and attempt to satisfy the strange requests of the dreaded Knights Who Say "Ni!". Robin avoids a fight with a Three-Headed Knight by running away while the heads are arguing amongst themselves. Galahad is led by a grail-shaped beacon to Castle Anthrax, which is occupied exclusively by nubile young women, all of whom attempt to woo him, but he is "rescued" against his will by Lancelot. Lancelot receives an arrow-shot note from the nearby Swamp Castle. Believing the author is a lady being forced to marry against her will, he storms the castle and slaughters several wedding party members, only to discover the author is an effeminate prince.

Arthur and his knights regroup and are joined by Brother Maynard, his monk brethren, and three new knights: Bors, Gawain and Ector. They meet Tim the Enchanter, a pyromancer who directs them to a cave where the location of the Grail is said to be written. The entrance to the cave is guarded by the Rabbit of Caerbannog. Underestimating it, the knights attack, but the Rabbit easily kills Bors, Gawain, and Ector. Arthur uses the "Holy Hand Grenade of Antioch", provided by Brother Maynard, to destroy the creature; the police officers investigating the historian's murder hear the explosion and begin pursuing them. Inside the cave, they find an inscription from Joseph of Arimathea, directing them to "the Castle of Arrrghhh". They are interrupted by an attack from the animated "Legendary Black Beast of Arrrghhh" that lives in the cave, which devours Brother Maynard and pursues the others. Arthur and the knights escape after the film's animator unexpectedly suffers a fatal heart attack, erasing the Black Beast.

The knights approach the Bridge of Death, where the bridgekeeper, the soothsayer Arthur and Bedevere met earlier, demands they each answer three questions to pass or else be cast into the Gorge of Eternal Peril. Lancelot easily answers simple questions and crosses. An overly cocky Robin is defeated by an unexpectedly difficult question, and an indecisive Galahad fails an easy one; both are magically flung into the gorge. When Arthur asks for clarification on a question regarding the airspeed velocity of an unladen swallow, the bridgekeeper cannot answer and is himself thrown into the gorge.

Arthur and Bedevere cannot find Lancelot, unaware that he has been arrested by police investigating the historian's death. They find Castle Arrrghhh occupied by the French soldiers from earlier in the film. After being repelled by showers of manure, they summon an army of knights and prepare to assault the castle. As the army charges, the police arrive, arrest Arthur and Bedevere on suspicion of the murder of the historian, and break the camera, abruptly ending the film.

== Cast ==
King Arthur (Graham Chapman, centre) with three of his knights: Sir Bedevere, Sir Lancelot and Sir Robin (Terry Jones, John Cleese and Eric Idle)

- Graham Chapman as:
  - Arthur, King of the Britons
  - The hiccuping guard
  - The middle head of the Three-Headed Giant
  - The voice of God
- John Cleese as:
  - Sir Lancelot the Brave
  - The Black Knight
  - French Taunter
  - Tim the Enchanter
  - And other roles
- Terry Gilliam as:
  - Patsy (Arthur's servant)
  - The Soothsayer / The Bridgekeeper
  - The Green Knight
  - Sir Bors
  - The Weak-Hearted Animator
  - And other roles
- Eric Idle as:
  - Sir Robin the-not-quite-so-brave-as-Sir-Lancelot
  - Lancelot's squire Concorde
  - The collector of the dead
  - Roger the Shrubber
  - Brother Maynard
  - And other roles
- Terry Jones as:
  - Sir Bedevere the Wise
  - Prince Herbert
  - Dennis' mother
  - The left head of the Three-Headed Giant
  - And other roles
- Michael Palin as:
  - Sir Galahad the Pure
  - Leader of the Knights Who Say Ni
  - Lord of Swamp Castle
  - Dennis
  - The right head of the Three-Headed Giant
  - The Narrator
  - And other roles
- Neil Innes as:
  - Leader of Robin's Minstrels
  - Head Monk
  - Knight of Camelot
  - Servant Crushed by Rabbit.
- Sandy Johnson as:
  - Knight Who Says Ni
  - Villager at Witch Burning
  - Musician at Wedding
  - Monk
  - Knight in Battle
- Connie Booth as Miss Islington (the Witch)
- Carol Cleveland as Zoot and Dingo, the identical twin sisters who run Castle Anthrax
- Bee Duffell as the Old Crone
- John Young as Frank the Historian
- Rita Davies as Frank's Wife
- Avril Stewart as Dr. Piglet
- Sally Kinghorn as Dr. Winston
- Julian Doyle as Police Sergeant (uncredited)
- Charles Knode as Camp Guard and Robin's Minstrel (uncredited)
- Roy Forge Smith as Inspector at End of Film (uncredited)
- Maggie Weston as Page Turner (uncredited)

== Production ==
=== Development ===
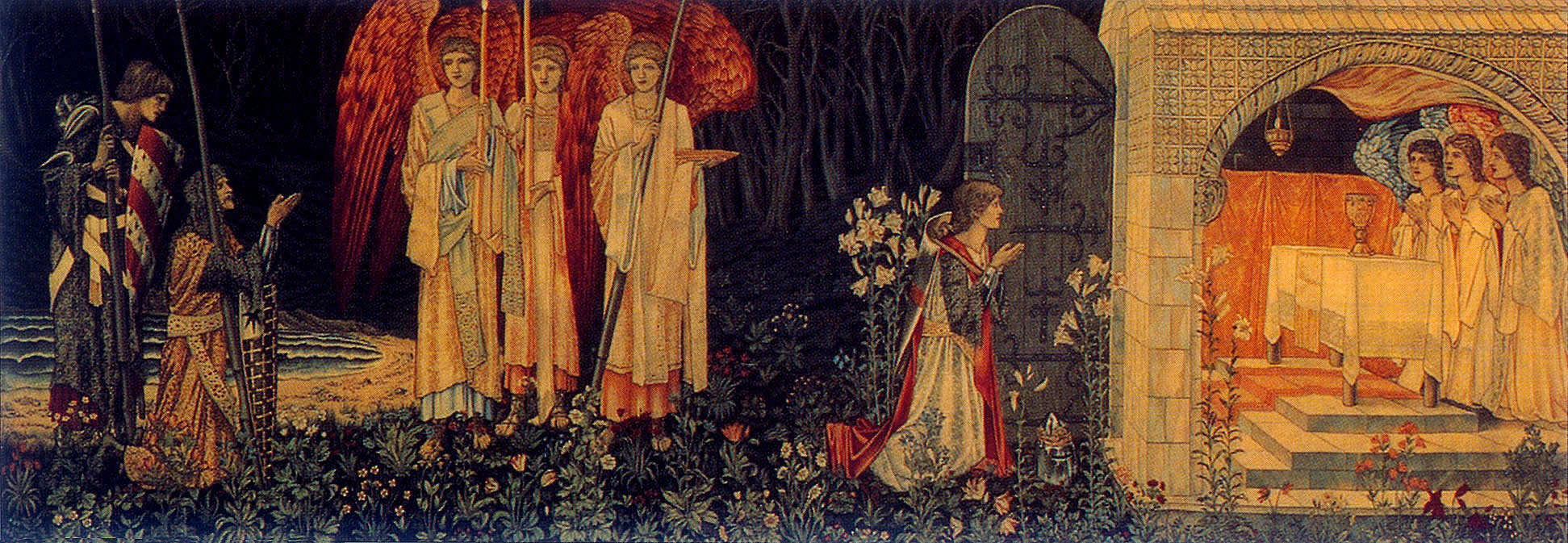
The legend of the Holy Grail (1895 tapestry depicted) provided a unifying motif for the film.

In January 1973, the Monty Python troupe wrote the first draft of the screenplay. Half of the material was set in the Middle Ages and half in the present day. The group decided to set the film during the Middle Ages and focus on the legend of the Holy Grail. By the fourth or fifth draft, the story was complete, and the cast joked that the fact that the Grail was never retrieved would be "a big let-down ... a great anti-climax". Graham Chapman said a challenge was incorporating scenes that did not fit the Holy Grail motif.

Neither Terry Gilliam nor Terry Jones had directed a film before, and described it as a learning experience in which they would learn to make a film by making an entire full-length film. The cast humorously described the novice directing style as employing the level of mutual disrespect always found in Monty Python's work.

=== Financing ===
According to Gilliam, the Pythons contacted rock bands like Pink Floyd and Led Zeppelin for financing because no studio would fund the film, and the rock stars saw it as "a good tax write-off" because the top rate of UK income tax was "as high as 90%" at the time. Producer Mark Forstater wrote in his book The 7th Python that funding came from himself, co-producer Michael White, Led Zeppelin, Pink Floyd, Ian Anderson from the band Jethro Tull, Gladiola Films, Tony Stratton Smith, and three record companies, Island Records, Chrysalis Records, and Charisma Records, the label that had released Python's early comedy albums. A 2021 tweet by Eric Idle revealed that the entire original budget of £175,350 (about $410,000 in 1974) was provided by eight investors: Led Zeppelin (£31,500), Pink Floyd (£21,000), Ian Anderson (£6,300), Michael White (£78,750), Heartaches (a cricket team founded by lyricist Tim Rice) (£5,250), and the record companies Island Records (£21,000), Chrysalis Records (£6,300), and Charisma Records (£5,250). The investors also received part of the proceeds from the 2005 musical Spamalot.

=== Filming ===
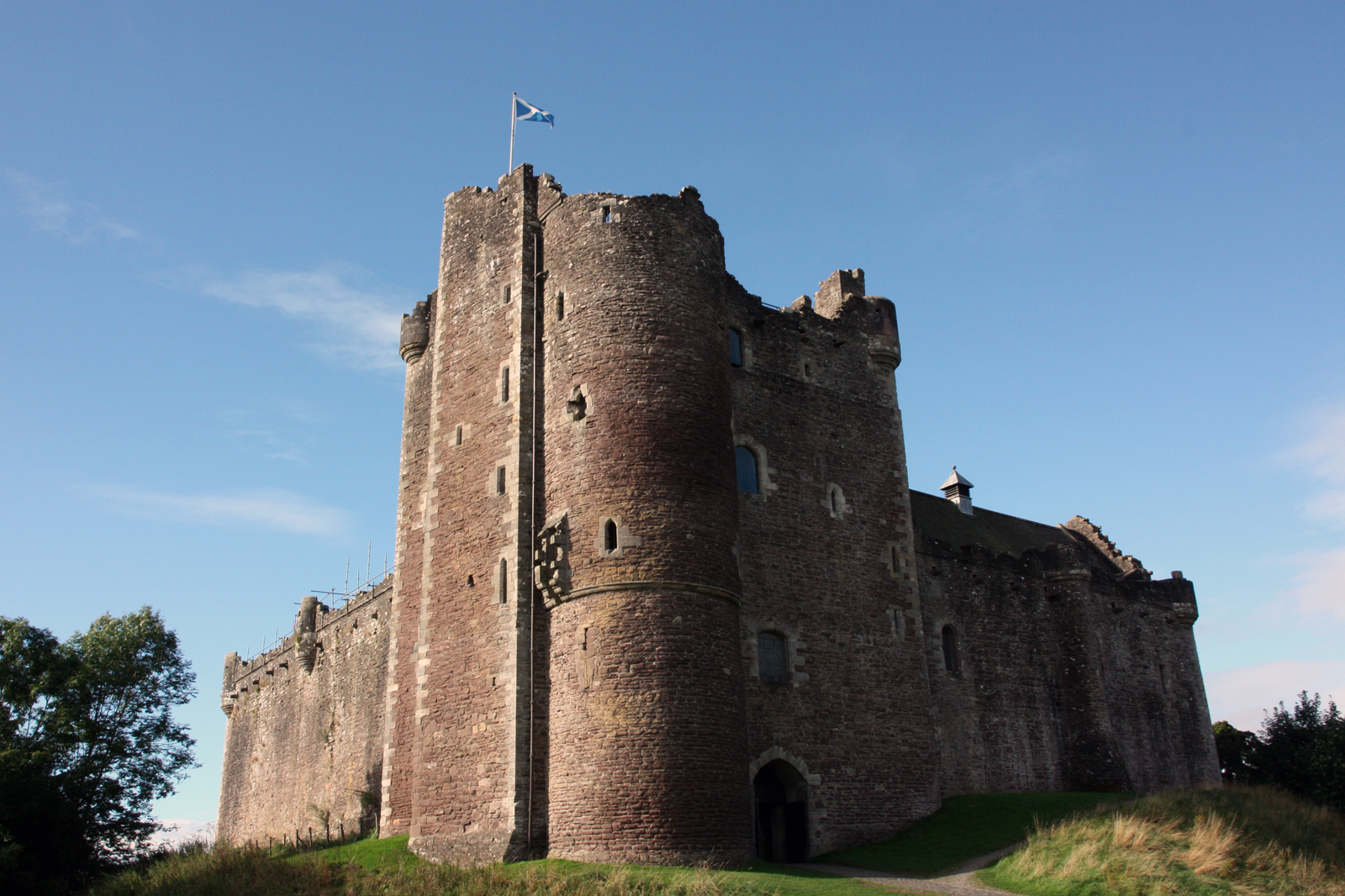
Doune Castle, used in several scenes

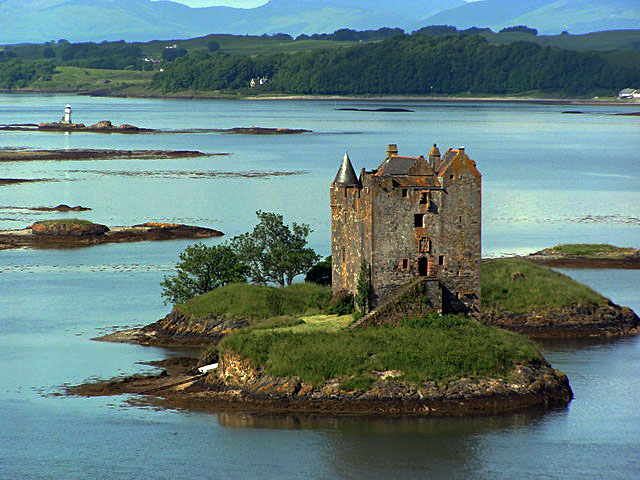
Castle Stalker, the location of the final scene

Monty Python and the Holy Grail was mostly shot on location in Scotland, particularly around Doune Castle, Glen Coe, and the privately owned Castle Stalker. The many castles seen throughout the film were mainly either Doune Castle shot from different angles or hanging miniatures. There are several exceptions to this: the first exterior shot of a castle at the beginning of the film is Kidwelly Castle in South Wales, and the single exterior shot of the Swamp Castle during "Tale of Sir Lancelot" is Bodiam Castle in East Sussex; all subsequent shots of the exterior and interior of those scenes were filmed at Doune Castle. Production designer Julian Doyle recounted that his crew constructed walls in the forest near Doune. Terry Jones later recalled the crew had selected more castles around Scotland for locations, but during the two weeks prior to principal photography, the Scottish Department of the Environment declined permission for use of the castles in its jurisdiction, for fear of damage.

At the start of "The Tale of Sir Robin", there is a slow camera zoom in on rocky scenery (that in the voice-over is described as "the dark forest of Ewing"). This is actually a still photograph of the gorge at Mount Buffalo National Park in Victoria, Australia. Doyle stated in 2000 during an interview with Hotdog magazine that it was a still image filmed with candles underneath the frame (to give a heat haze). This was a low-cost method of achieving a convincing location effect.

On the DVD audio commentary, Cleese described challenges shooting and editing Castle Anthrax in "The Tale of Sir Galahad", with what he felt the most comedic take being unused because an anachronistic coat was visible in it. Castle Anthrax was also shot in one part of Doune, where costume designer Hazel Pethig advised against nudity, dressing the girls in shifts.

The scene in which the knights fight the Rabbit of Caerbannog was filmed at Tomnadashan mine. A real white rabbit was used, switched with puppets for its killings. The bite effects were done with special puppetry by both Gilliam and SFX technician John Horton. According to Gilliam, the rabbit was covered with red liquid to simulate blood, though its owner did not want the animal dirty and was kept unaware. The liquid was difficult to remove from the fur. Gilliam also stated that he thought, in hindsight, the crew could have just purchased their own rabbit instead. Regardless, the rabbit itself was unharmed.

As chronicled in The Life of Python, The First 20 Years of Monty Python, and The Pythons' Autobiography, Chapman suffered from acrophobia, trembling and bouts of forgetfulness during filming due to his alcoholism, prompting him to refrain from drinking while the production continued in order to remain "on an even keel". Nearly three years later, in December 1977, Chapman achieved sobriety.

Originally the knight characters were going to ride real horses, but after it became clear that the film's small budget precluded real horses (except for a lone horse appearing in a couple of scenes), the Pythons decided their characters would mime horse-riding while their porters trotted behind them banging coconut shells together. The joke was derived from the old-fashioned sound effect used by radio shows to convey the sound of hooves clattering. This was later referred to in the German release of the film, which translated the title as Die Ritter der Kokosnuß (The Knights of the Coconut). Similarly, the Hungarian title Gyalog galopp translates to "Galloping on Foot".

== Soundtrack ==
In addition to several songs written by Python regular Neil Innes, several pieces of music were licensed from De Wolfe Music Library. These include:

- "Wide Horizon", composed by Pierre Arvay; used during the opening titles.
- "Ice Floe 9", composed by Pierre Arvay; used during the opening titles.
- "Countrywide", composed by Anthony Mawer; used during the beginning titles after the first titlers are "sacked".
- "Homeward Bound", composed by Jack Trombey; used as King Arthur's heroic theme.
- "Crossed Swords", composed by Dudley Matthew; played during King Arthur's battle with the Black Knight.
- "The Flying Messenger", composed by Oliver Armstrong; played during Sir Lancelot's misguided storming of Swamp Castle.
- "The Promised Land", composed by Stanley Black; used in the scene where Arthur approaches the castle on the island.
- "Starlet in the Starlight", composed by Kenneth Essex; briefly used for Prince Herbert's attempts to express himself in song.
- "Love Theme", composed by Peter Knight; also used briefly for Prince Herbert.
- "Revolt", composed by Eric Towren; used as the army charges on Castle Aaargh.

Innes was supposed to write the film's soundtrack in its entirety, but after the team watched the movie with Innes's soundtrack, they decided to go instead with "canned" music, music borrowed from existing stock recordings. One problem with Innes's music, apparently, was that they considered it too appropriate, so that, according to Python scholar Darl Larsen, it "undercut the Pythons' attempt at undercutting the medieval world they were trying to depict".

== Release ==
Advance publicity for Monty Python and the Holy Grail included a theatrical trailer incorporating scenes from the film, footage not included in the film (Arthur knighting a peasant only to stab him when the prop castle in the background falls over), and excerpts of Graeme Garden and Terry Jones in a parody of Ingmar Bergman's The Seventh Seal filmed for the 1967 sketch comedy series Twice a Fortnight. Narrated largely by British actor Burt Kwouk in Mandarin Chinese, the trailer concludes by advertising a Chinese restaurant ostensibly located four minutes from where the film is playing.

Monty Python and the Holy Grail had its theatrical debut in London on 3 April 1975, followed by a screening on 27 April 1975 at the Century Plaza Cinemas in Los Angeles. It opened to the public in the United States at Cinema II in New York City on 28 April.

The film had its television premiere 25 February 1977 on the CBS Late Movie. Reportedly, the Pythons were displeased to discover a number of edits were done by the network to reduce use of profanity and the showing of blood. The troupe pulled back the rights and thereafter had it broadcast in the United States only on PBS and later other channels such as Comedy Central and IFC, where it runs uncut.

The book Monty Python and the Holy Grail (Book) (titled Mønti Pythøn ik den Hølie Gräilen (Bøk) on the spine) was published by Methuen Publishing in 1977. The book includes two versions of the script - the 1973 first draft (titled Monty Python's Second Film) and the 1974 final draft - as well as various photographs and ancillary material such as the film's Statement of Financial Position and Cost of Production Statement.

The film has been periodically re-released. A "21st anniversary edition" was released on video in 1995 with 24 seconds of extra footage. This version with a new stereo soundtrack was released in theatres starting 15 June 2001 in the United States. It was re-released on 14 October 2015 in the United Kingdom. It was re-released together with a special "quote-along" version in early December 2023 to celebrate its "48th-and-a-half anniversary".

=== Box office ===
The film grossed $122,200 in its first three weeks in London. In its first week in New York it grossed $35,000.

According to records of the NFFC, as of 31 December 1978 the distributor earned receipts of £2,358,229 in the United Kingdom. It earned rentals in the US and Canada of $5.17 million.

=== Home media ===
In Region 1, The Criterion Collection released a LaserDisc version of the film featuring audio commentary from directors Jones and Gilliam.

In 2001, Columbia TriStar published a two-disc, special-edition DVD. Disc one includes the Jones and Gilliam commentary, a second commentary with Idle, Palin and Cleese, the film's screenplay on a subtitle track and "Subtitles for People Who Don't Like the Film"–consisting of lines taken from William Shakespeare's Henry IV, Part 2. Disc two includes Monty Python and the Holy Grail in Lego, a "brickfilm" version of the "Camelot Song" as sung by Lego minifigures. It was created by Spite Your Face Productions on commission from the Lego Group and Python Pictures. The project was conceived by the original film's respective producer and co-director, John Goldstone and Terry Gilliam. Disc two also includes two scenes from the film's Japanese dub, literally translated back into English through subtitles. "The Quest for the Holy Grail Locations", hosted by Palin and Jones, shows places in Scotland used for the setting titled as "England 932 A.D." (as well as the two Pythons purchasing a copy of their own script as a guide). Also included is a who's who page, advertising galleries and sing-alongs. A "Collector's Edition" DVD release additionally included a book of the screenplay, a limited-edition film cell/senitype, and limited-edition art cards.

On the special edition DVD, the studio logos, opening credits and a brief portion of the opening scene of 1961 British Film Dentist on the Job is added to the start of the film. The clip ends with a spluttering, unseen "projectionist" realising he has played the wrong film. A "slide" then appears urging the audience to wait one moment please while the operator changes reels.

A 35th-anniversary edition on Blu-ray was released in the US on 6 March 2012. Special features include "The Holy Book of Days," a second-screen experience that can be downloaded as an app on an iOS device and played with the Blu-ray to enhance its viewing, lost animation sequences with a new intro from animator Terry Gilliam, outtakes and extended scenes with Python member and the movie's co-director Terry Jones.

It was released on Blu-ray again for the film's 40th anniversary on 27 October 2015, including a new special feature consisting of a Q&A with the Pythons at the Tribeca Film Festival. Its physical release had a limited edition box set resembling a castle with a catapult and rubber animals to launch.

For the film's 50th anniversary, Sony Pictures Home Entertainment released Monty Python and the Holy Grail on Ultra HD Blu-ray on 26 August 2025.

== Reception and legacy ==
Contemporary reviews were mixed. Vincent Canby of The New York Times wrote in a favourable review that the film had "some low spots," but had gags which were "nonstop, occasionally inspired and should not be divulged, though it's not giving away too much to say that I particularly liked a sequence in which the knights, to gain access to an enemy castle, come up with the idea of building a Trojan rabbit." Charles Champlin of the Los Angeles Times was also positive, writing that the film, "like Mad comics, is not certain to please every taste. But its youthful exuberance and its rousing zaniness are hard not to like. As a matter of fact, the sense of fun is dangerously contagious." Penelope Gilliatt of The New Yorker called the film "often recklessly funny and sometimes a matter of comic genius."

Other reviews were less enthusiastic. Variety wrote that the storyline was "basically an excuse for set pieces, some amusing, others overdone." Gene Siskel of the Chicago Tribune gave the film two and a half stars, writing that he felt "it contained about 10 very funny moments and 70 minutes of silence. Too many jokes took too long to set up, a trait shared by both Blazing Saddles and Young Frankenstein. I guess I prefer Monty Python in chunks, in its original, television revue format." Gary Arnold of The Washington Post called the film "a fitfully amusing spoof of the Arthurian legends" but "rather poky" in tempo, citing the running gag of Swedish subtitles in the opening credits as an example of how the Pythons "don't know when to let go of any shtik". Geoff Brown of The Monthly Film Bulletin wrote in a mixed review that "the team's visual buffooneries and verbal rigamaroles (some good, some bad, but mostly indifferent) are piled on top of each other with no attention to judicious timing or structure, and a form which began as a jaunty assault on the well-made revue sketch and an ingenious misuse of television's fragmented style of presentation, threatens to become as unyielding and unfruitful as the conventions it originally attacked."

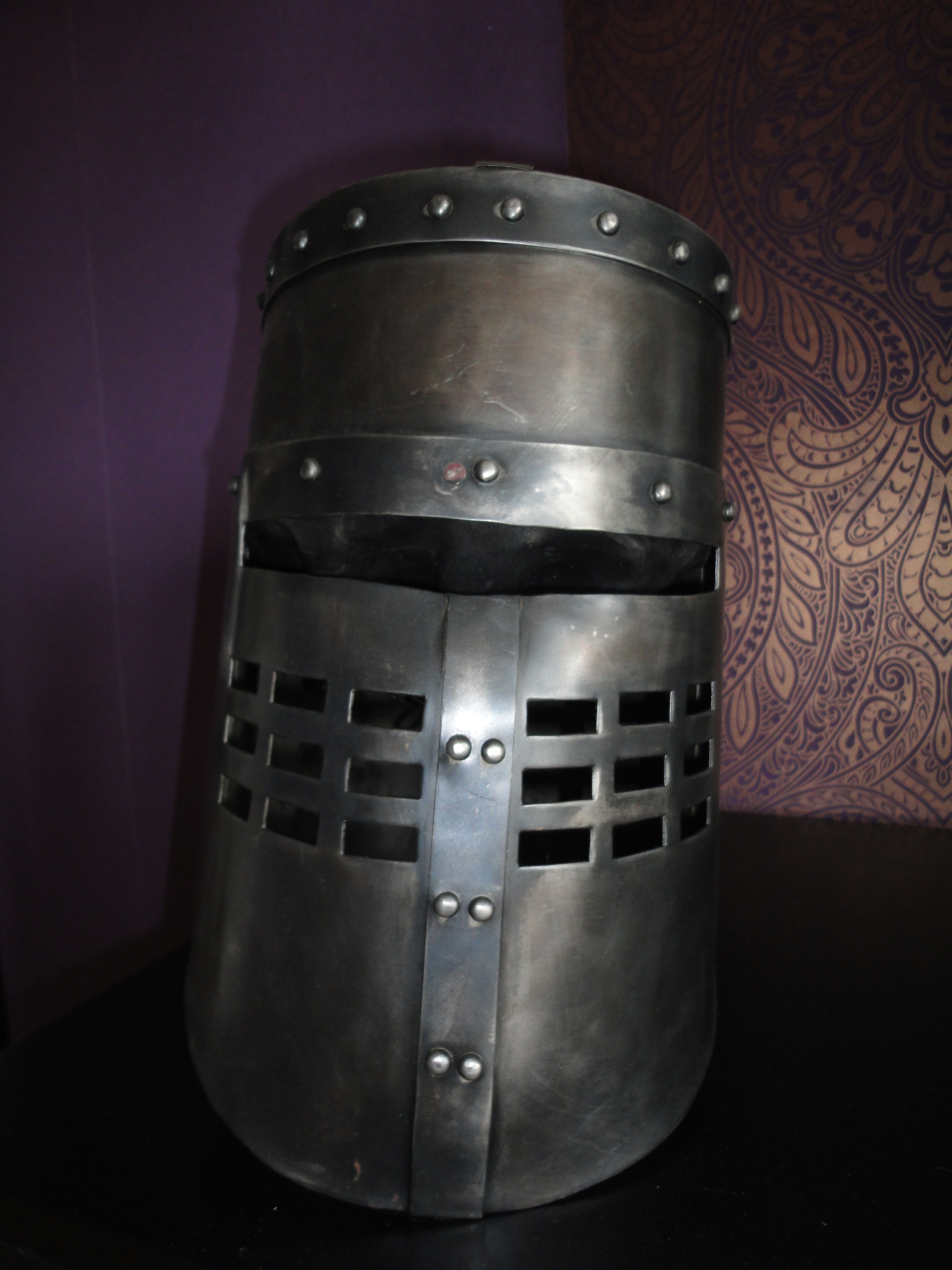
The Black Knight's helmet. His lines, "Tis but a scratch" and "It's just a flesh wound…" are often quoted.

The film's reputation grew over time. In 2000, readers of Total Film magazine voted Holy Grail the fifth-greatest comedy film of all time. The next Python film, Life of Brian, was ranked first. A 2006 poll of Channel 4 viewers on the 50 Greatest Comedy Films saw Holy Grail placed sixth (with Life of Brian again topping the list). In 2011, an ABC prime-time special, Best in Film: The Greatest Movies of Our Time, counted down the best films chosen by fans based on results of a poll conducted by ABC and People. Holy Grail was selected as the second best comedy after Airplane! In 2016, Empire magazine ranked Holy Grail 18th in their list of the 100 best British films (Life of Brian was ranked 2nd), their entry stating, "Elvis ordered a print of this comedy classic and watched it five times. If it's good enough for the King, it's good enough for you."

In a 2017 interview at Indiana University in Bloomington, John Cleese expressed disappointment with the film's conclusion. "'The ending annoys me the most...It ends the way it does because we couldn't think of any other way'". However, scripts for the film and notebooks that are among Michael Palin's private archive, which he donated to the British Library in 2017, do document at least one alternative ending that the troupe considered: "a battle between the knights of Camelot, the French, and the Killer Rabbit of Caerbannog". Due to the film's small production budget, that idea for a "much pricier option" was discarded by the Pythons in favour of the ending with "King Arthur getting arrested", which Palin deemed "cheaper" and "funnier".

Review aggregator Rotten Tomatoes offers a 92% approval rating from reviews of 131 critics. The consensus reads, "A cult classic as gut-bustingly hilarious as it is blithely ridiculous, Monty Python and the Holy Grail has lost none of its exceedingly silly charm." On Metacritic, the film has a score of 91 out of 100 based on 24 critics' reviews, indicating "universal acclaim".

=== Spamalot ===
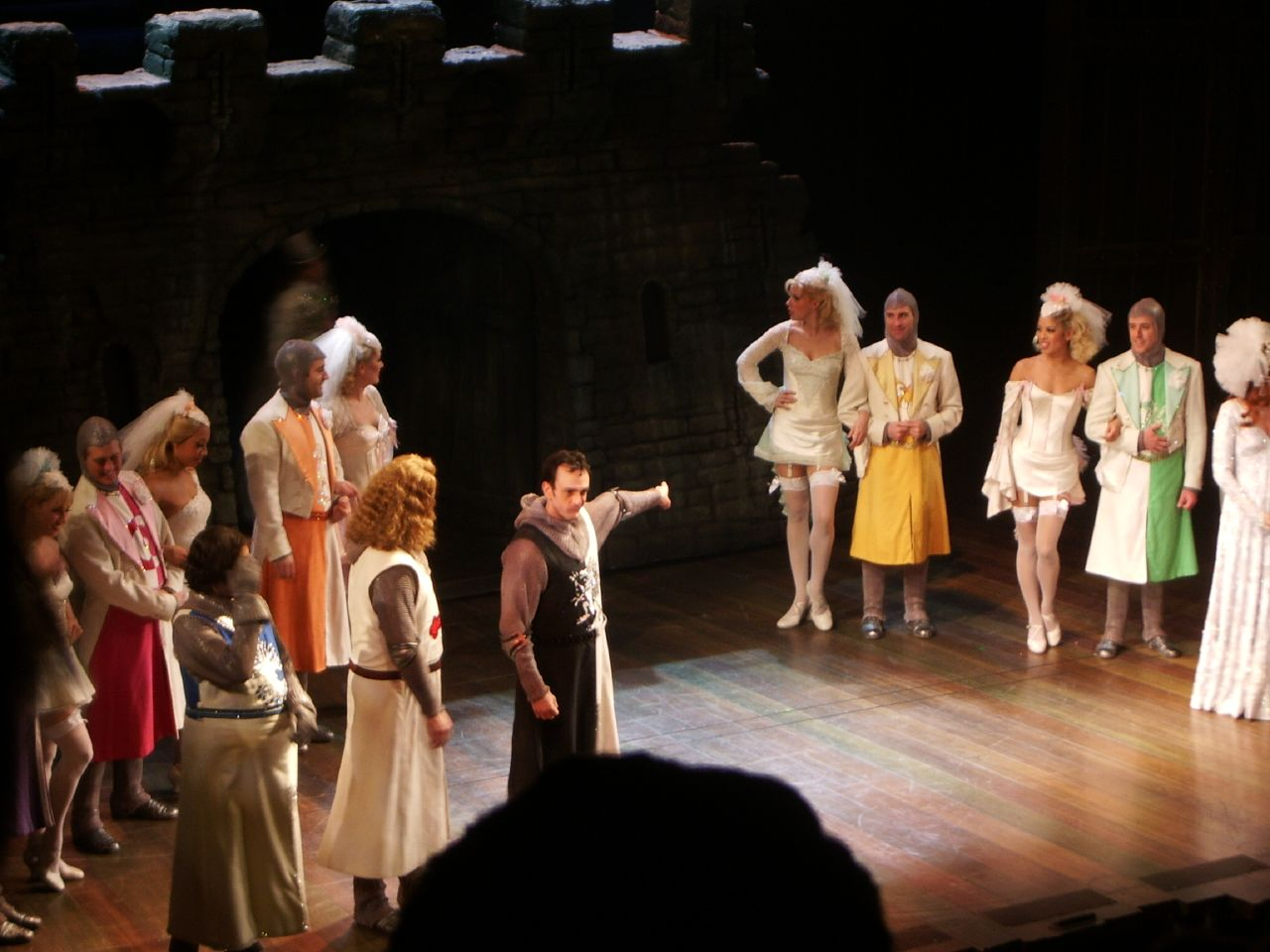
Hank Azaria in the original Broadway production of Spamalot

The film was adapted as the 2005 Tony Award-winning Broadway musical Spamalot. Written primarily by Idle, the stage show offers a revised plot, while retaining many jokes from the film.

In May 2018, 20th Century Fox green-lit a film adaptation of the musical. Idle would write the screenplay and stage director Casey Nicholaw would direct. Slated to begin filming in early 2019, production was delayed as a result of the acquisition of 20th Century Fox by The Walt Disney Company. The project announced a move to Paramount Pictures on January 6, 2020, with Idle and Nicholaw still attached as writer and director, and Dan Jinks joining as a producer. However, in 2021, Idle confirmed on his Twitter account that the film would not be made because two of his former colleagues opposed it.

A Broadway revival began previews on October 31, 2023, at the St. James Theatre, with an official opening night of November 16, 2023.

In 2013, the Pythons lost a legal case to Mark Forstater, the film's producer, owing a combined £800,000 in legal fees and back royalties to Forstater for the derivative work of Spamalot. To help cover the cost of these royalties and fees, the group arranged and performed in a stage show, Monty Python Live (Mostly), held at the O_{2} Arena in London in July 2014.

=== Games ===
In 1996, the film adapted into the computer game Monty Python & the Quest for the Holy Grail. In 2022, tabletop role-playing game company Exalted Funeral launched a Kickstarter for Monty Python's Cocurricular Mediaeval Reenactment Programme, an RPG mostly based on Holy Grail while taking elements from other Monty Python productions, such as Spam, the giant foot from Flying Circus, the Judean revolutionaries from Life of Brian, and the Grim Reaper from The Meaning of Life. The game was released in 2025, and won two Silver Awards at the ENNIE Awards.

== See also ==
- List of cult films
- List of films considered the best
- Surrealist cinema
- Postmodernist film
- Production music
