= Black Knight (Monty Python) =

Character from Monty Python and the Holy Grail

- Monty Python character
- The Black Knight, as portrayed by John Cleese in Monty Python and the Holy Grail (1975)
- First appearance: Monty Python and the Holy Grail; 3 April 1975
- Portrayed by: John Cleese

In-universe information
- Gender: Male
- Occupation: Guardian of the Bridge, Knight
- Weapon: Swordplay

The Black Knight is a fictional character who first appeared as a minor antagonist in the 1975 comedy film Monty Python and the Holy Grail by the Monty Python comedy troupe. A knight dressed in black who wears a helmet concealing his face, he is based on the Arthurian legend of the Black Knight. Like most of the characters in Holy Grail, he is played by a member of Monty Python, namely John Cleese, who primarily portrays Lancelot in the film.

The Black Knight appears in a scene of Holy Grail, in which he guards a tiny bridge over a small stream and fights King Arthur, who wants to pass it; although a brave and skilled swordfighter, he is defeated by Arthur, who is soon bewildered by the knight's staunch refusal to admit his obvious defeat. He also appears in the musical Spamalot, in which Christopher Sieber premiered the role in 2005.

== Overview ==
In the film, King Arthur (Graham Chapman), accompanied by his squire Patsy (Terry Gilliam), is travelling through a forest when he observes a fight taking place between the Black Knight (John Cleese) and a Green Knight (also played by Gilliam) by a bridge over a small stream. The Black Knight defeats the Green one by throwing his sword straight through the eye slit of the Green Knight's great helm. Arthur congratulates the Black Knight and offers him a place at his court at the Round Table, but the Black Knight makes no response until Arthur moves to cross the bridge (a small plank of wood). The Black Knight moves slightly to block Arthur and declares "None shall pass". King Arthur objects, and the Black Knight threatens Arthur with death.

Reluctantly, King Arthur fights the Black Knight and, after a short battle, the Knight's left arm is severed. The Knight refuses to stand aside, insisting "'Tis but a scratch", and fights on. Next, his right arm is cut off, but the Knight still does not concede. As the Knight is disarmed, Arthur assumes the fight is over and kneels to pray. The Black Knight interrupts Arthur's prayer by kicking him in the side of the head and accusing him of cowardice. Arthur cuts off the Black Knight's right leg. At this point, Arthur has lost all of his respect for the Knight, yet he still will not admit defeat, and attempts to ram his body into Arthur's. Arthur is annoyed and sarcastically asks the Black Knight if he is going to bleed on him to win. With an air of resignation, Arthur finally cuts off the left leg as well. With the Black Knight now reduced to a torso with a head, he declares the fight a draw. Arthur then summons Patsy and "rides" away, leaving the Black Knight's limbless torso screaming threats at him with a cracking voice.

== Behind the scenes ==
According to the DVD audio commentary by Cleese, Michael Palin and Eric Idle, the sequence originated in a story told to Cleese when he was attending an English class during his school days. Two Roman wrestlers were engaged in a particularly intense match and had been fighting for so long that the two combatants were doing little more than leaning into one another. It was only when one wrestler finally tapped out and pulled away from his opponent that he and the crowd realised the other man was, in fact, dead and had effectively won the match posthumously. The moral of the tale, according to Cleese's teacher, was "if you never give up, you can't possibly lose" – a statement that, Cleese reflected, always struck him as being "a very dodgy conclusion".

Cleese said that the scene would seem heartless and sadistic except for the fact that the Black Knight shows no pain and just keeps on fighting, or trying to, however badly he is wounded. Also, as the scene progresses and Arthur becomes increasingly annoyed, his dialogue lapses from archaic ("You are indeed brave, Sir Knight, but the fight is mine.") to modern ("Look, you stupid bastard, you've got no arms left!"), and finally to just plain sarcastic ("What are you gonna do, bleed on me?"), while the Black Knight remains just as defiant ("I'm invincible!" he yells with only one leg left, to which Arthur simply replies "You're a loony.").

This scene is one of the best-known of the entire film. A famous line of the scene, "'Tis but a scratch", is similar to a line the character Mercutio speaks in Shakespeare's Romeo and Juliet, wherein he demurs, saying "Ay, ay, a scratch, a scratch", referring to his mortal wound, and the former has since become an expression used to comment on someone who ignores a fatal flaw or problem. The phrase "'Tis but a flesh wound", following a character entering "with coconut shells tied to his feet", notably appeared in an early episode of The Goon Show titled "The Giant Bombardon", broadcast in 1954; the Monty Python group has acknowledged being influenced by the Goons. A humorous reference to a potentially mortal injury being a "flesh wound" also appeared in the 1940 screwball comedy His Girl Friday, in response to a maid being reported shot by a sheriff's deputy.

=== Stand in ===
The Knight was, in fact, played by two actors: John Cleese is in the Knight's armour until he is down to one leg. The Knight is then played by a real one-legged man, a local by the name of Richard Burton, a blacksmith who lived near the film shoot, because, according to the DVD commentary, Cleese could not balance well on one leg. After the Knight's remaining leg is cut off, the quadruple-amputee that remains is again Cleese. In the musical Spamalot, the scene with the Black Knight was the most difficult to play on stage, according to Eric Idle. Penn & Teller created the illusion for the musical.

== See also ==
- Pas d'armes, a late medieval custom of fighting passing knights for honor
- Arrhichion, a Greek sport-fighter who was judged victorious in death
