= Spite Your Face Productions =

British animation production company

Spite Your Face Productions, or SYF, is an animation production company based in London, England, consisting of animation directors Tony Mines and Tim Drage. They have created a variety of animated content for broadcast, web and DVD, but are best known for their series of stop-motion animated Lego shorts.

Since 2001, SYF have worked on five animated projects for the Lego company and their respective clients, including Sony, Marvel Entertainment, Lucasfilm and Python (Monty) Pictures. They have also produced Lego animations independently. SYF refer to these works as "Bricksploitation films" to distinguish them from those of the fan community. Some of their films have been distributed internationally on DVD.

== Selected filmography ==
Spider-Man: The Peril of Doc Ock
Released in support of Spider-Man 2, two alternate ending versions of this film exist.

Star Wars: The Han Solo Affair
The Empire Strikes Back spoof, produced in the run-up to Star Wars: Episode II – Attack of the Clones.

Monty Python & the Holy Grail in Lego
Version of the "Camelot" song and dance sequence. Produced as an extra for the Monty Python and the Holy Grail DVD.

ONE: A Space Odyssey
One minute Lego version of the Kubrick epic, 2001: A Space Odyssey.
