= Caroline Smith (set decorator) =

Caroline Smith is a set decorator. She was nominated for the Academy Award for Best Art Direction for her work on The Imaginarium of Doctor Parnassus, for which she also saw nominated for the BAFTA Award for Best Production Design.

Smith was the initial set decorator for Kenneth Branagh's Murder on the Orient Express, but had to exit due to personal reasons and was replaced with Rebecca Alleway.

== Select filmography ==
- Firelight (1997)
- Love Actually (2003)
- Stage Beauty (2004)
- Match Point (2005)
- Notes on a Scandal (2006)
- The Kite Runner (2007)
- Brideshead Revisited (2008)
- The Imaginarium of Doctor Parnassus (2009)
- The Devil's Double (2011)
- Johnny English Reborn (2011)
- Great Expectations (2012)
- Florence Foster Jenkins (2016)
- Murder on the Orient Express (2017)
- Christopher Robin (2018)
- Blackbird (2019)
- Blithe Spirit (2020)
