= The Imaginarium of Doctor Parnassus =

2009 film by Terry Gilliam

- British theatrical release poster
- Directed by: Terry Gilliam
- Written by: Terry Gilliam; Charles McKeown
- Produced by: William Vince; Amy Gilliam; Samuel Hadida; Terry Gilliam
- Starring: Heath Ledger; Christopher Plummer; Verne Troyer; Andrew Garfield; Lily Cole; Tom Waits; Johnny Depp; Colin Farrell; Jude Law
- Cinematography: Nicola Pecorini
- Edited by: Mick Audsley
- Music by: Mychael Danna; Jeff Danna
- Production companies: Davis Films; Infinity Features; Poo Poo Pictures; Telefilm Canada
- Distributed by: Lionsgate (United Kingdom); Metropolitan Filmexport (France); E1 Entertainment (Canada); Mandate International (International)
- Release dates: 22 May 2009 (Cannes); 16 October 2009 (United Kingdom); 11 November 2009 (France); 25 December 2009 (Canada)
- Running time: 123 minutes
- Countries: United Kingdom; Canada; France
- Language: English
- Budget: $30 million
- Box office: $64.4 million

The Imaginarium of Doctor Parnassus is a 2009 fantasy film directed by Terry Gilliam and written by Gilliam and Charles McKeown. The film follows a travelling theatre troupe whose leader, having made a bet with the Devil, takes audience members through a magical mirror to explore their imaginations and present them with a choice between self-fulfilling enlightenment or gratifying ignorance.

The film stars Heath Ledger, Christopher Plummer, Verne Troyer, Andrew Garfield, Lily Cole, Tom Waits, Johnny Depp, Colin Farrell, and Jude Law, though Ledger's death one-third of the way through filming caused production to be temporarily suspended. Ledger completed most of the movie's runtime, and then his role was recast with Depp, Law, and Farrell portraying transformations of his character as he travels through a dream world. The film is Ledger's final performance; it was dedicated to him and co-producer William Vince.

Its world premiere was during the 62nd Cannes Film Festival, out of competition. The film, which cost $30 million to make, grossed more than $60 million in its worldwide theatrical release. It received mostly positive reviews from critics.

It was nominated for two Academy Awards. The first was Best Art Direction with art directed by Dave Warren and Anastasia Masaro, and set decorated by Caroline Smith; it lost to Avatar. The second was Best Costume Design with costumes designed by Monique Prudhomme; it lost to The Young Victoria.

== Plot ==
Elderly sage Doctor Parnassus runs a travelling theatre troupe, which includes his teenage daughter Valentina, barker Anton, and dwarf Percy. The troupe's main attraction is a portal to a magical "Imaginarium", a surreal dream world that transforms according to its participants' desires, offering them a choice between difficult self-fulfillment or easy ignorance.

After a surly drunkard is swayed to the latter, Parnassus comments he has lost "another one" to Mr. Nick, a suave personification of the Devil, who often taunts Parnassus and gloats over his failures. He reminds Parnassus that in three days, upon Valentina's 16th birthday, her soul belongs to him. Hundreds of years ago, Mr. Nick tricked Parnassus into accepting immortality.

As the troupe crosses a bridge, Anton notices someone hanging beneath it. Rescuing the man, he spits out a golden pipe that allowed him to continue breathing while being hanged; the man claims to have amnesia. Mr. Nick visits Parnassus and reveals that the rescued man is disgraced philanthropist Tony Shepard, who was hanged by Russian gangsters for owing them money. Mr. Nick offers Parnassus a new wager: Valentina can stay with him past 16 if Parnassus wins five souls before Mr. Nick.

Tony joins the troupe as a barker and persuades them to remodel the show into a more modern act. He lures a posh, affluent woman into the Imaginarium and follows her; they enter a pastel-coloured dream world representing her imagination. Her imagination changes Tony's face as well. Tony dances with her, and they encounter a motel run by Mr. Nick, but he persuades the woman instead to take a gondola ride that wins the first soul for Parnassus.

Tony falls out of the Imaginarium, his face returning to normal. The woman exits shortly after and gives the troupe a vast sum of money as thanks for her experience. Three other women enter, each re-emerging elated. Mr. Nick claims the souls of four Russian gangsters hunting Tony down for his debts after they chase him into the Imaginarium and fall into a trap laid by Mr. Nick, with Tony's face changing again in the process.

Parnassus reveals to Valentina his past: after aging from normal mortality, he made a pact with Mr. Nick to be youthful again, in order to win the heart of a woman he loved. In exchange, any child he fathered would become Mr. Nick's property at the age of 16. Valentina is horrified by her father's revelation.

Having discovered that Tony stole organs from orphans in developing countries and sold them to wealthy westerners, Anton confronts him, but Tony fights him off, pushes Valentina into the Imaginarium, then joins her. Influenced by Valentina's desires, Tony's face changes to that of her dream lover, and they float along a river in a gondola, fulfilling their shared sexual feelings.

A child in rags disrupts their trip, transitioning the scene to one of Tony as a philanthropist, speaking at a fundraiser for impoverished children. Anton appears in the form of an outspoken child exposing him as a fraud. A mob of angry benefactors pursues Tony. As the landscape disintegrates, Anton confesses his love for Valentina before falling into a void. Distraught over her father's bargain, Valentina gives her soul over to Mr. Nick even as he tries dissuading her.

Disillusioned by the easy victory, Mr. Nick offers Parnassus another bargain: Valentina's soul for Tony's. As the mob approaches Tony to hang him, Parnassus presents Tony with his golden pipe that will allow him to survive the hanging, and also offers him a brittle replica. He then tricks Tony into choosing the replica, so he dies when the mob lynches him. Mr. Nick frees Valentina's soul but does not reveal her location to Parnassus, who is abandoned to wander in despair, trapped in the Imaginarium.

Years later, Parnassus finds himself a beggar back in London, when Valentina walks by. She is married to Anton, has a daughter with him, and lives an affluent life. Percy dissuades him from interrupting Valentina's new life. Parnassus and Percy team up again, selling toy theatres of the Imaginarium and the troupe on a street corner. As Mr. Nick appears and beckons him, Percy tells Parnassus to return to work.

== Cast ==
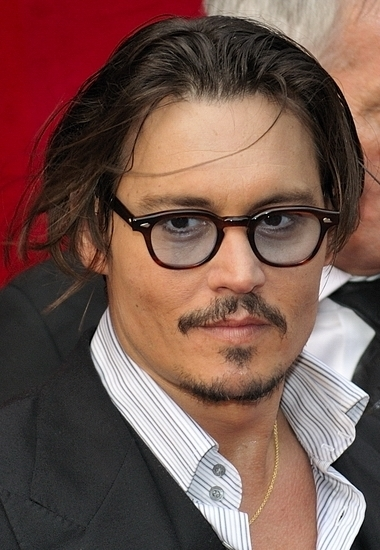
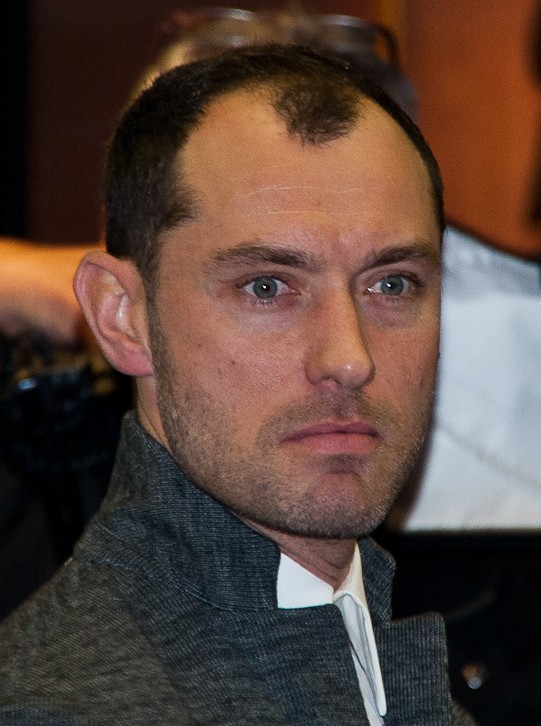
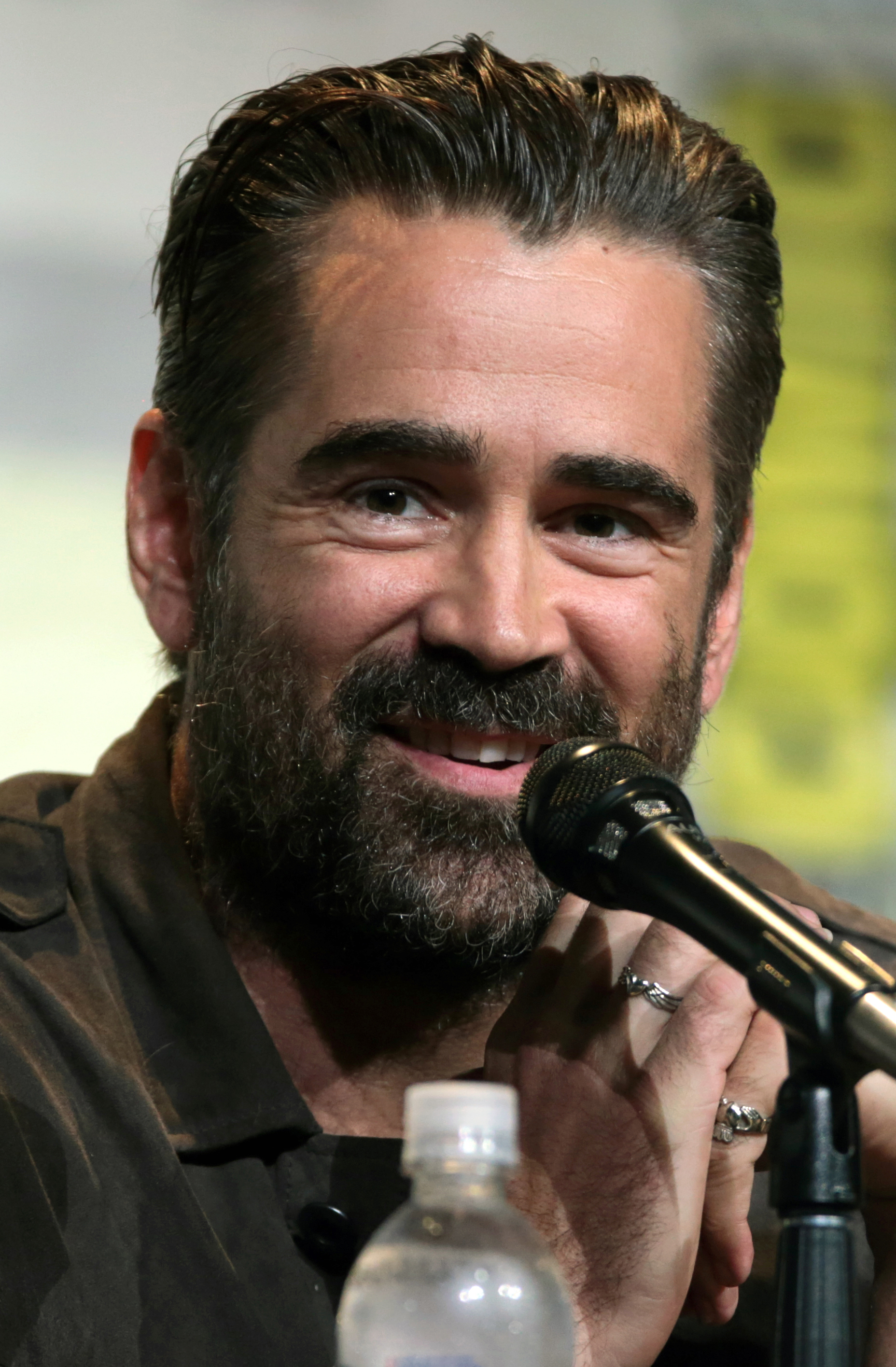
Johnny Depp, Jude Law, and Colin Farrell all helped complete the film after the death of Heath Ledger.
- Heath Ledger as Tony Shepard. When Ledger died during production, the latter duration of the role was recast for certain scenes to show "physically transformed versions" of the character within the Imaginarium:
  - Johnny Depp as Tony (first transformation)
  - Jude Law as Tony (second transformation)
  - Colin Farrell as Tony (third transformation)
- Christopher Plummer as Doctor Parnassus
- Andrew Garfield as Anton
- Verne Troyer as Percy
- Lily Cole as Valentina
- Tom Waits as Mr. Nick
- Paloma Faith as Sally
- Gwendoline Christie as Shopper
- Peter Stormare as The President
- Charles McKeown as Fairground Inspector
- Maggie Steed as Louis Vuitton Woman
- Mark Benton as Dad
- Simon Day as Uncle Bob
- Richard Riddell as Martin
- Montserrat Lombard as Sally's friend

== Production ==
=== Writing ===
Director Terry Gilliam and screenwriter Charles McKeown wrote the script, their first collaboration since The Adventures of Baron Munchausen (1988). When he was approached with the basic concept by Gilliam, McKeown thought of the central character of Parnassus "as a semi-eastern medicine man evolved", and in retrospect he further said about the script's sensibilities, "It is about the theme of imagination, and the importance of imagination, to how you live and how you think and so on. And that's very much a Terry theme. [...] I like the idea of storytelling being the thing that sustains the universe." Gilliam described the premise as a "fun and humorous story about the consequences of our personal choices in life", and explained his goal for the film: "It's autobiographical. I'm trying to bring a bit of fantasticality to London, an antidote to modern lives. I loved this idea of an ancient travelling show offering the kind of storytelling and wonder that we used to get, to people who are just into shoot-em-up action films." Gilliam and McKeown based the character of Tony on former British prime minister Tony Blair, who "would say the most insane things and probably he'd believe them himself".

Gilliam repeatedly said in interviews that the character of Parnassus was meant autobiographically, a tale of an aging man with a vivid imagination in a world that does not listen anymore. He was still caught in depression over the disruption of his last self-written project, The Man Who Killed Don Quixote, his constant struggle with the established studio system, and of becoming aware of his progressing age, worried that he was going nowhere with his latest projects and that he might not have much time left. He had already put several references to sudden, tragic, and premature death into his script before Ledger's death. He was compelled to emphasise that upon the film's release many things might be mistaken as references to Ledger's fate but that the script wasn't changed apart from re-casting Tony with Depp, Farrell, and Law.

=== Filming ===
The film received an initial budget of $25 million, but its final budget was about $30 million. Gilliam and his cinematographer Nicola Pecorini went wider than ever before on focal length with a new 8mm Zeiss lens, unusual even for Gilliam movies which are known for wide-angle imagery. The widest lens on a Gilliam film had been a 9.8mm Kinoptik. Production of the remaining computer generated imagery effects shots were done in Vancouver.

==== London filming ====
Production started in December 2007, beginning with various shots of the Imaginarium wagon moving about the London suburbs, such as Bounds Green, on the evening of 9 December. The carnival scenes were shot at Potters Field between 10 and 11 December; shooting then moved to the abandoned Battersea Power Station for three days, where the production had set up offices nearby. After a full day of set-up, the hanging scenes at Blackfriars Bridge were shot for three hours on the evening of 17 December.

At the same time that an intimate early scene between Andrew Garfield and Lily Cole was being shot on top of the travelling Imaginarium wagon, second unit work around London was also being done for several more nights, until 20 December; this change in schedule was to allow Heath Ledger a break to travel back to Australia to visit his family. After the entire cast returned from Christmas break, the production resumed shooting for 2008 back at Battersea for one full day; this was Tom Waits's first day on set, as he would mainly be required for the subsequent Vancouver shoot, not the London section. From 5 to 6 January, the production filmed scenes with the Imaginarium at Leadenhall Market; shooting on this sequence managed an average of 70 set-ups a day. The production had originally planned to shoot the Leadenhall scenes at Bond Street, but this was scrapped, due to security concerns.

==== Effects of Heath Ledger's death ====
Production was halted by the death of Heath Ledger in New York City on 22 January 2008. Ledger's involvement had been a "key factor" in the film's financing. Gilliam was presiding over concept art when he was informed by a phone call that Ledger had died. His initial thought about the production was: "The film's over, it's as simple as that." Although production was suspended indefinitely by 24 January, Gilliam initially wanted to "salvage" the film by using computer-generated imagery to make Ledger's character magically change his appearance, perhaps into another character. He also wanted to dedicate the film to Ledger. The imagery would have been similar to transformation techniques seen on Brad Pitt in The Curious Case of Benjamin Button and those employed on Roy Scheider's performance in his posthumous release Iron Cross.

Eventually, actors Johnny Depp, Colin Farrell, and Jude Law were cast into Ledger's character in certain scenes, portraying the new idea of transformed versions of the character travelling through magical realms. Ledger's footage would remain in the film as his character's "real-world" appearance. Gilliam told Entertainment Weekly, "Then we made the quantum leap: What if we get three actors to replace him? [...] Johnny was the first person I called. He said, 'Done. I'm there.' Same with Jude and Colin." Depp, a friend of Gilliam's who starred in Fear and Loathing in Las Vegas and the aborted 1998 production of The Man Who Killed Don Quixote, had been compared to Ledger by cinematographer Nicola Pecorini. Law was also a friend of Ledger's and had been considered for the role of Tony, and Farrell had also been friends with Ledger.

Initially, Tom Cruise expressed interest in being involved as another actor to replace Ledger, but Gilliam turned him down because Cruise had never been a close friend of Ledger. Gilliam stated, "I just wanted to keep this [in the] family—it's as simple as that [...] There were people even offering to come and help, they didn't know Heath. It had to be in the family somehow, I don't know why; it was my attitude."

One scene planned for the Vancouver shooting with the Tony character was scrapped; two others were altered to accommodate Ledger's absence, a third was added to plan for Colin Farrell's role in the film, and a fourth, already in the script, had a prop of Farrell in a magazine added. A fifth, with close-ups of Ledger already filmed, scrapped any major dialogue from Tony and used a body and voice double, as detailed below.

==== Vancouver filming ====
With the role recast, and the script restructured accordingly, filming resumed in Vancouver on 24 February 2008, a month later than originally planned; this push-back in filming also required another film produced by Samuel Hadida, an adaptation of the video game Onimusha, to be delayed indefinitely. Exteriors required for the film's ending, featuring Christopher Plummer and Verne Troyer, were shot during this time; the location work also required the presence of Tom Waits (on the first day) and Lily Cole (on the second). All of Plummer's scenes, including exterior flashbacks shown early on in the film, had to be filmed first in the Vancouver schedule, within three weeks, as he was due to leave to begin filming on The Last Station, which was to start production in Germany on 7 April.

After arriving in Vancouver on 26 February, Colin Farrell joined the cast and began practicing scenes with them for several weeks while Christopher Plummer's bluescreen and interior work was done, only beginning filming proper on 10 March. Farrell's work was the first of the Tonys to be done, as it was the only Imaginarium-based shooting that involved significant sets; the scenes at the charity ball were shot (at Vancouver's Orpheum Theatre), then the hanging scene, and finally the gondola sequence (rewritten from its original conception due to the now-compressed shooting schedule).

Johnny Depp's shooting on the film was the hardest to incorporate into any of the new actors' schedules, due to his contractual obligation on Michael Mann's Public Enemies at the time; in the end, Gilliam had access to Depp for one day and three hours. All of the shots involving him had to be completed in one take, to fit into Depp's compressed time schedule.

A few of the scenes featuring Zander Gladish, behind a mask, doubling for Ledger

Finally, Jude Law arrived at the very end of shooting, on 2 April, to film the Imaginarium ladders sequence, which now required more dialogue than originally planned; a key scene in the Imaginarium wagon between Tony and the rest of the cast had been reserved for the Vancouver interior shooting, and so all of the dialogue (and, thus, narrative role of that scene) had to be funnelled into a conversation between Law and Andrew Garfield's characters in the Imaginarium. This conversation proved to be the last sequence shot for the film, and involved a set completely improvised, on the day, to look like the ground at Battersea; they did not have the budget for anything better, but the production crew came away quite impressed at how well it worked.

For the first two Imaginarium sequences, a double for Ledger, Zander Gladish, was used to ease the audience into the other actors as Tony. Gladish also doubled for Ledger in wide shots and masked close-ups for another, non-Imaginarium scene, where his character tries out various costumes. Gladish wore the character's mask for his shots, and did not speak, but is still credited for his work on the film.

Depp, Farrell, and Law opted to redirect their wages for the role to Ledger's young daughter, Matilda, who had been left out of an old version of Ledger's will, and Gilliam altered the part of the credits saying "A Terry Gilliam film" to "A film from Heath Ledger and friends."

Gilliam said in retrospect about the first transition from Ledger to Depp in the film:

He's extraordinary. That's why I put Johnny in first position [of the three new Tonys], because number one, he was going to be the most difficult to get any time with, and number two, I just thought if it works with the transition to Johnny and if the audience goes for it, they'll follow the next two. And that's exactly how it works. ... That's what's funny, when Johnny appears so many people think it's Heath! And it's a trick: Johnny's not doing anything. He looks like Johnny. [During the initial shoot] Heath was on stage and the Russians are appearing, and he was behaving in a very funny way, he was moving around, and I said, 'Heath, I know what you're doing.' He said, 'What are you talking about?' 'You're doing Johnny Depp, aren't you?' And can you believe, that helps this transition [when Ledger enters the mirror and becomes Depp]. This was not intended!"

Depp said of the experience:

Maestro Gilliam has made a sublime film. Wonderfully enchanting and beautiful, The Imaginarium of Doctor Parnassus is a uniquely ingenious, captivating creation; by turns wild, thrilling and hilarious in all its crazed, dilapidated majesty. Pure Gilliam magic! It was an honor to represent Heath. He was the only player out there breathing heavy down the back of every established actor's neck with a thundering and ungovernable talent that came up on you quick, hissing rather mischievously with that cheeky grin, "hey ... get on out of my way, boys, I'm coming through ..." and does he ever!!! Heath is a marvel, Christopher Plummer beyond anything he's ever done, Waits as the Devil is a God, Lily Cole and Andrew Garfield, the very foundation, are spectacular, Verne Troyer simply kicks ass and as for my other cohorts, Colin Farrell and Jude Law, they most certainly did Master Ledger very proud, I salute them. Though the circumstances of my involvement are extremely heart-rending and unbelievably sad, I feel privileged to have been asked aboard to stand in on behalf of dear Heath."

Jude Law also commented on the film:

I have always loved Terry Gilliam's films. Their heart, their soul, their mind, always inventive, touching, funny and relevant. When I got the call, it was a double tug. I liked Heath very much as a man and admired him as an actor. To help finish his final piece of work was a tribute I felt compelled to make. To help Terry finish his film was an honour paid to a man I adore. I had a great time on the job. Though we were all there in remembrance, Heath's heart pushed us with great lightness to the finish.

Colin Farrell commented on the experience:

It's not hard for me to imagine that if I ever look back on the films I've been a part of, and the stories I've had a hand in telling, one will stand out as so unique an experience, as to be incomparable. This experience was the shooting of The Imaginarium of Doctor Parnassus. The reasons for its uniqueness, sadly, are probably obvious to anyone who reads this.

Three of us had been asked to complete a task that had been set in motion by a man we greatly liked and respected as both a person and an artist. Being part of this film was never about filling Heath's shoes as much as seeing them across the finish line. How I wish he had brought the film to its completion himself. Of course, the whole crew felt this way. And the cast that we joined felt it, too. It was this spirit of grieving the loss of Heath, that Johnny and Jude and I joined. But there was also a sense of dogged insistence. Insistence that Heath's last piece of work should not be kept in the shadow of the light of day.

More than anything, though – more than the sadness and shock, the vulnerability and un-suredness as to whether it was right to complete the film or not – was an incredible sense of love. A community of people, caterers and actors, electricians and makeup artists had been brought together in a recognized sense of love and obligation, for and to, one of cinema's finest actors and most generous of men. It will be this sense of love amidst the sadness I will remember most. Such a gift and an honor, from Heath, to be a part of the trail that he left behind.

RIP Heath Ledger x

=== Post-production ===
Principal photography in Vancouver wrapped, as planned, on 15 April, but the production was soon beset by further tragedy when producer William Vince died of cancer, just two days after model shooting back in London had wrapped. Fellow producer Amy Gilliam, Terry's daughter, remembered, "[Bill Vince] always said, 'If you get your film in the can, you'll be all right.' And I kind of believe that he stayed with us to know that happened." Eventually, while on post-production, Gilliam himself was hit by a car, resulting in a cracked vertebra. Gilliam recalled: "So I thought, it was third time lucky – they just didn't get me. They got the star, the producer, and they were going for the director, and the fuckers failed on the last one. Whoever they are ..." "They were going for the trinity ... That would have been a tidy end to the whole thing. But they didn't kill me. I'm stuck here to tell the tale."

Gilliam finished editing the film by November 2008, and then work began on creating 647 computer generated imagery effects shots. As usual with his films, Gilliam found inspiration in particular painters for each CGI-generated scene inside the titular Imaginarium. According to Designing the Imaginarium published by CBSnews.com, the scene with Doctor Parnassus's attempted suicide related to the style of Odd Nerdrum, the Ladder World with Jude Law featuring "rolling hills with simple trees" was inspired by the art of Grant Wood, the kitsch landscape from the beginning of the sequence with Colin Farrell took inspiration from Maxfield Parrish, and Jose Maria Sert's mural of the Crucifixion in Rockefeller Center inspired the scene including the final minutes of Farrell's appearance in the film.

According to the official ParnassusFilm Twitter account launched on 30 March 2009, post-production was finished on 31 March. After the production had finally come to a successful closure, Gilliam felt that "[I] didn't make this film. Forces from above and below made it. It made itself. I don't worry anymore. It's got its own relentless momentum. It just needed some human sacrifice." "It's made itself – I was just one pair of hands and there were many hands." "Don't get me into my mystical mode [...] but the film made itself and it was co-directed by Heath Ledger!" "The irony is that the choices that were forced upon us improved the movie, so it was as if Heath co-directed the movie, even co-wrote it." According to Gilliam, actor Colin Farrell also went on record for saying that he hadn't been simply playing the character of Tony, but that he was rather feeling like "channeling Heath".

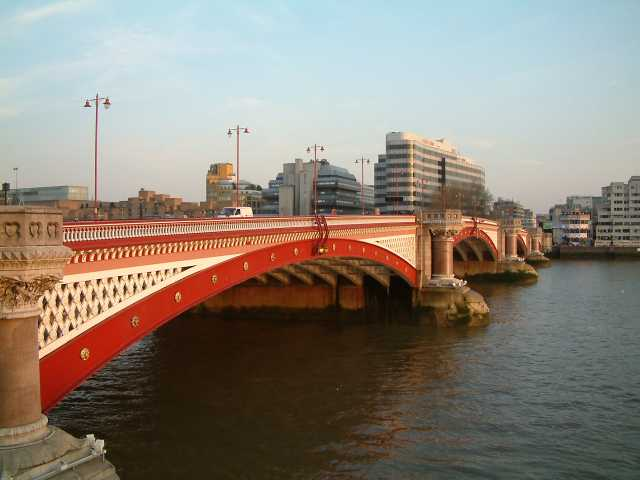
Tony is found hanging under Blackfriars Bridge.

Gilliam also positively recalled people's commitment to Ledger's memory: "Everyone in the cast and everyone in the crew was determined that this film would be finished and everybody worked longer, harder and somehow we got through. It was really [...] people's love for Heath that propelled this thing forward." "All the actors already in the film had to change their schedules, and there wasn't a moment's hesitation. [...] They all said, 'We'll do what's necessary.' It's really a love letter to Heath by everybody involved. He was beloved by so many."

== Locations ==
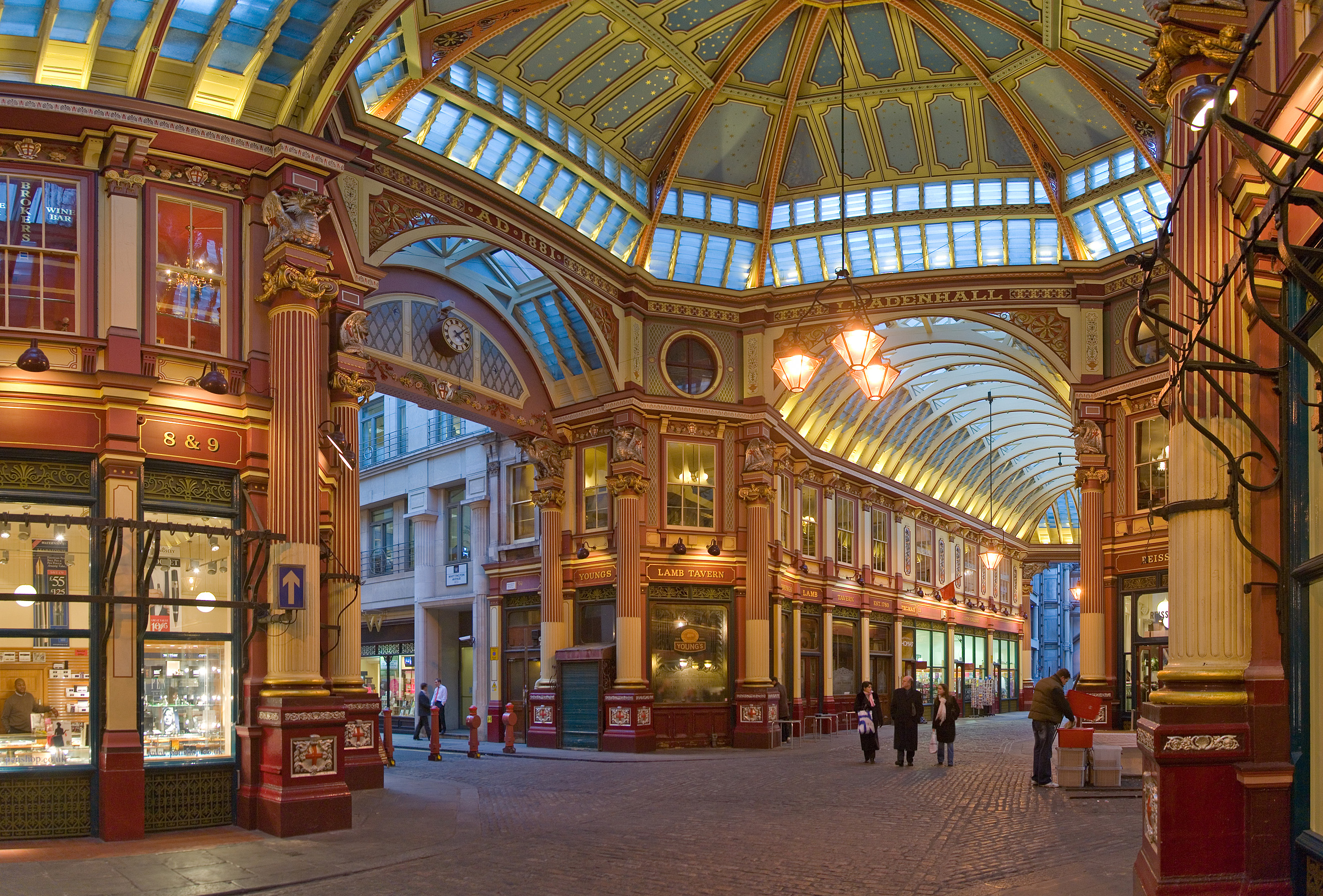
The restyled show debuts in Leadenhall Market.

The film opens with St Paul's Cathedral in the background (by the north bank of the Thames), and the first show is performed under the rail tracks at Green Dragon Court, directly next to Borough Market, with Southwark Cathedral in the background (in Borough, London, on the south bank of the Thames), where the drunken lout molests the performers and then enters the mirror. The next scene, with Tower Bridge in the background, is just east along the riverbank, by City Hall. Tony is found hanging under Blackfriars Bridge, and the very large disused building in which the following scene (and several later ones) occurs is the interior of Battersea power station, farther west along the south bank of the river.

The following scenes occur north of the Thames: the Homebase, DIY store at 3 Station Road, south of New Southgate railway station, in New Southgate, followed by the Horseshoe pub in Clerkenwell Close in Clerkenwell from which the wagon flees. The restyled show makes its debut in Leadenhall Market, where the stylish women gather to watch. Bray Studios near Windsor was used for model shooting and additional photography.

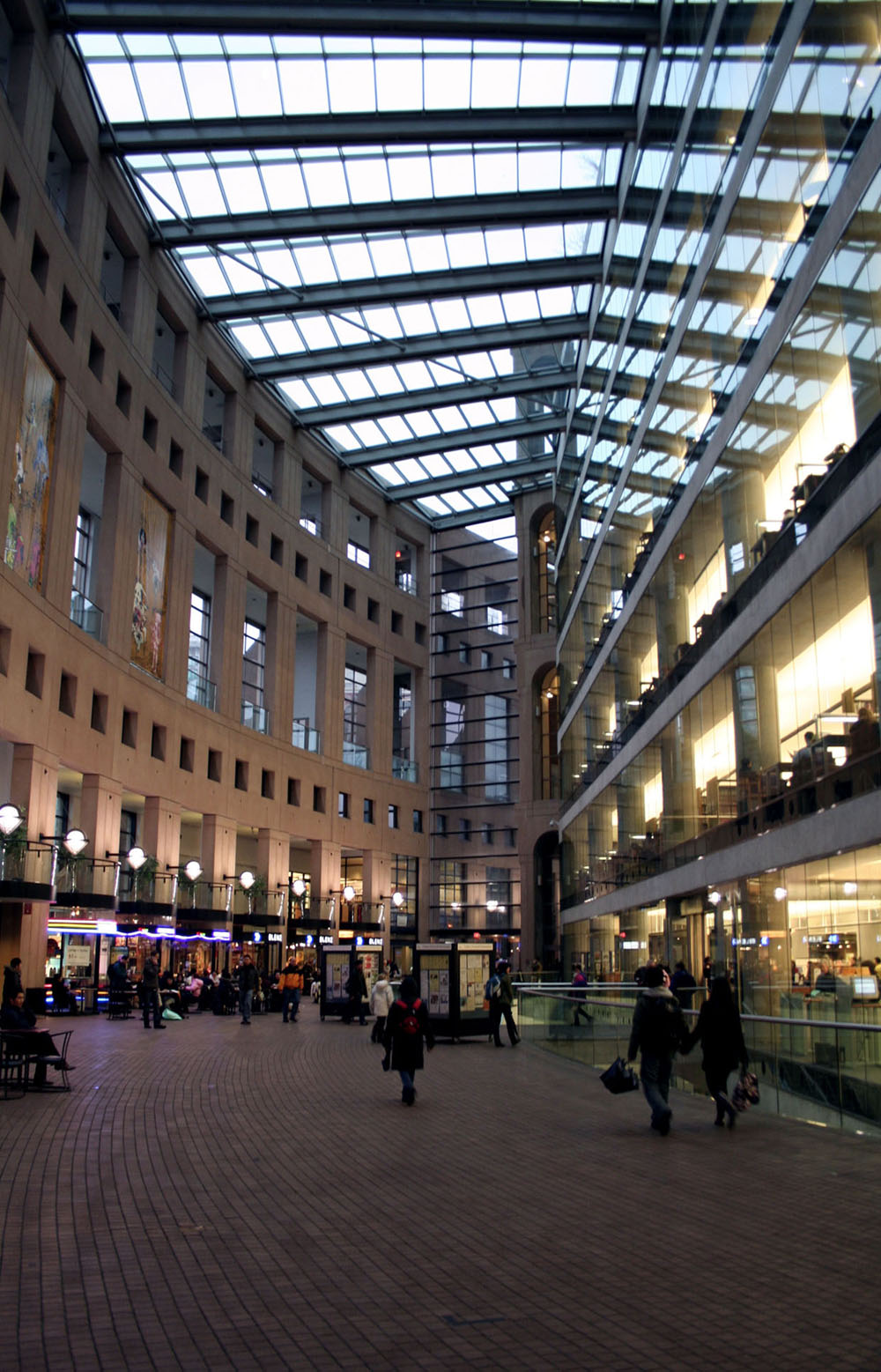
The "mall" is the foyer of the Central Branch of the Vancouver Public Library.

The remaining scenes were filmed in Vancouver. The fantasy scenes were filmed at Bridge Studios in Burnaby, while the charity gala occurs at the Orpheum Theatre, and the glass-walled "mall" is the Central Branch of the Vancouver Public Library, the curved arcade being the library's entrance foyer.

== Music ==
The original motion picture soundtrack of The Imaginarium of Doctor Parnassus was composed by Mychael Danna and Jeff Danna, who had previously worked on Gilliam's Tideland (2005). Gilliam wrote lyrics for the two songs "We Love Violence" and "We Are the Children of the World", the latter of which spoofed Michael Jackson's famous "We Are the World" and was nominated for a 2009 Satellite Award in the category "Best Original Song".

The song "We Love Violence", performed in the film by policemen in drag, was sung by Gilliam, Mick Audsley (who edited the film), the musician Ray Cooper, Ed Hall (who was also the Visual Effects Editor), and Andre Jacquemin (who was Supervising Sound & Design on the film).

== Release ==
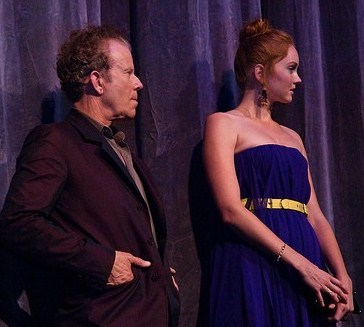
Tom Waits and Lily Cole promoted the film at the 2009 Toronto International Film Festival.

Before it was finished, the film had already received healthy interest from worldwide distributors and had sold out across the world. However, it received mild response from many distributors in the United States. Gilliam said that Fox Searchlight Pictures and other distributors had declined to release it in the US. Eventually, its American distribution rights were acquired by Sony Pictures Worldwide Acquisitions Group, which released it in the US through Sony Pictures Classics. The US was the last territory in which it was sold. Gilliam said that his team asked for $4 million for selling the American rights, but ultimately couldn't get it.

=== Box office ===
According to Reuters, the film debuted at No. 3 on its first weekend at the UK box office. The film debuted at No. 2 in both France and Italy, generating the year's third-best box office return on an opening weekend in Italy. Said Roberto Proia, distribution chief of the film's Italian distributor Moviemax, about its surprisingly warm reception, "Almost two years after his death, Ledger has a huge fanbase which, along with the rest of the stellar cast, certainly contributed hugely. [...] We also found out that teenagers massively love Gilliam, and we did not expect this. He really has rock star status." Eventually, the film had earned about $54,119,168 theatrically in the countries outside North America.

It earned $415,233 on its North American limited opening Christmas weekend (25–27 December 2009), being presented in 48 theatres with an average of $8,651. Its second weekend (1–3 January 2010) set an average of $7,684 with a gross of $368,836 which totaled $1,029,821 domestically. Releasing in 607 North American theatres, it took eleventh place on its opening wide release box office weekend (8–10 January 2010) with earnings of $1,762,637, an average of only $2,904 and a total of $2,989,290. Eventually, the film had earned $7,689,607 theatrically in North America.

According to executive producer David Valleau, the film had already made its budget back even before it opened in North America.

==== Home media ====
The film was released on DVD and Blu-ray in the United Kingdom (Region 2) on 29 March 2010, by Lionsgate Home Entertainment. Supplementary material includes an audio commentary and an introduction by Gilliam, deleted scenes, wardrobe test for Heath Ledger, visual FX feature, and three featurettes titled "Behind the Mirror", "Building the Temple", and "UK Premiere".

The DVD and Blu-ray were released in the US on 27 April 2010. The film went on to bigger success in US ancillary markets, with more than $11,657,192 in US Blu-ray and DVD sales alone.

== Reception ==
Review aggregator Rotten Tomatoes reports that 64% of 197 critics have given the film a positive review, with a rating average of 6/10. The website's critical consensus is that "Terry Gilliam remains as indulgent as ever, but The Imaginarium of Doctor Parnassus represents a return to the intoxicatingly imaginative, darkly beautiful power of his earlier work, with fine performances to match all the visual spectacle." Metacritic, which assigns a normalised rating out of 100 to reviews from film critics, has a rating score of 65 based on 30 reviews, indicating 'generally favourable reviews'.

Roger Ebert gave the film 3 stars out of 4:

The story in Gilliam's fevered film is all over the map, as usual, but this time there's a reason. His wild inventions in character, costumes and CGI effects are accounted for by a plot that requires revolving worlds.

== Awards and nominations ==
Award	Category	Recipient	Result
Academy Awards	Best Art Direction	Dave Warren, Anastasia Masaro and Caroline Smith	Nominated
Academy Awards	Best Costume Design	Monique Prudhomme	Nominated
BAFTA Awards	Best Production Design	Dave Warren, Anastasia Masaro and Caroline Smith	Nominated
BAFTA Awards	Best Make Up & Hair	Sarah Monzani	Nominated
British Independent Film Awards	Best Achievement in Production		Nominated
Costume Designers Guild	Excellence in Fantasy Film	Monique Prudhomme	Won
Empire Awards	Best British Film		Nominated
Empire Awards	Best Sci-Fi/Fantasy		Nominated
Satellite Award	Best Art Direction and Production Design	Anastasia Masaro, Dave Warren, Terry Gilliam	Nominated
Satellite Award	Best Costume Design	Monique Prudhomme	Won
Satellite Award	Best Original Song	Terry Gilliam; For the song "We Are the Children of the World"	Nominated
Satellite Award	Best Visual Effects		Nominated
Saturn Awards	Best International Film		Nominated
Saturn Awards	Best Make-Up	Sarah Monzani	Nominated
