= Terry Gilliam =

American-born British filmmaker (born 1940)

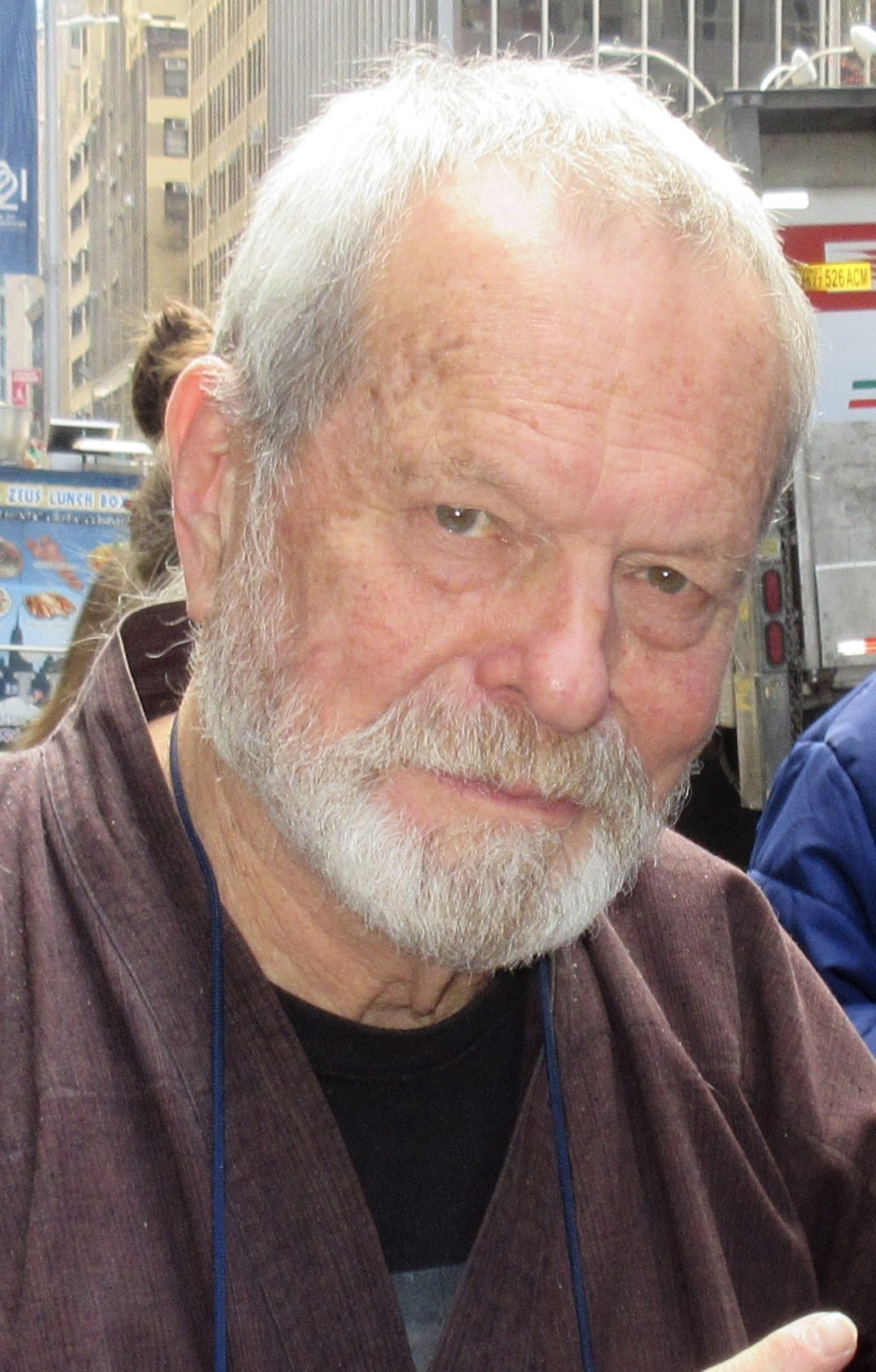
- Gilliam in 2019
- Born: Terrence Vance Gilliam; 22 November 1940 (age 85); Minneapolis, Minnesota, U.S.
- Citizenship: United States (1940–2006); United Kingdom (1968–present)
- Education: Occidental College (BA)
- Occupations: Screenwriter; director; comedian; animator; actor
- Years active: 1968–present
- Works: Filmography; unrealized projects
- Spouse: Maggie Weston (m. 1973)
- Children: 3
- Awards: Full list
- Terry Gilliam's voice from BBC's Desert Island Discs, 15 April 2011
- Website: terrygilliamweb.com

Terrence Vance Gilliam (/ˈɡɪliəm/ GIL-ee-əm; born 22 November 1940) is an American-born British filmmaker, comedian, collage animator, and actor. In a career spanning more than five decades, he has received various accolades including the BAFTA Fellowship for lifetime achievement in 2009, as well as nominations for an Academy Award, a Golden Globe Award, and a BAFTA Award.

Gilliam started his career as an animator and strip cartoonist. He joined Monty Python as the animator of their works, but eventually became a full member and was given acting roles, gaining stardom as a member of the comedy troupe alongside John Cleese, Eric Idle, Michael Palin, Terry Jones, and Graham Chapman. Together they collaborated on the sketch series Monty Python's Flying Circus (1969–1974) and the films Monty Python and the Holy Grail (1975, also co-directed), Life of Brian (1979), and The Meaning of Life (1983). They received the BAFTA Award in 1988 for Outstanding British Contribution to Cinema.

As Python started to take longer breaks between projects following Monty Python and the Holy Grail, Gilliam became a solo filmmaker; after directing The Crimson Permanent Assurance—to which he was nominated for the BAFTA Award for Best Short Film—Python effectively ceased working together, and Gilliam pursued his career as a filmmaker. He transitioned to directing serious films with themes exploring imagination and oppositions to bureaucracy and authoritarianism. His films are sometimes set in dystopian worlds and involve black comedy and tragicomedic elements. He has directed thirteen feature films, making his directorial debut with Monty Python and the Holy Grail and his solo directorial debut with Jabberwocky (1977).

Gilliam gained breakthrough with Time Bandits (1981) and has since directed ten more films, gaining further acclaim with the next two "Trilogy of Imagination" films—Brazil (1985) and The Adventures of Baron Munchausen (1988)—and The Fisher King (1991), the first and last of which earned him nominations for the Academy Award for Best Original Screenplay and the Golden Globe Award for Best Director respectively. He also directed 12 Monkeys (1995) and other directing credits include Fear and Loathing in Las Vegas (1998), The Brothers Grimm (2005), The Imaginarium of Doctor Parnassus (2009), and The Man Who Killed Don Quixote (2018). Gilliam is the only Monty Python member not born in Britain; he became a naturalised British citizen in 1968 and formally renounced his American citizenship in 2006.

== Early life and education ==
Terrence Vance Gilliam was born on 22 November 1940 in Minneapolis, Minnesota, the son of Beatrice (née Vance) and James Hall Gilliam. His father was a travelling salesman for Folgers before becoming a carpenter. Soon after, they moved to nearby Medicine Lake, Minnesota. In 1952, the family moved to the Los Angeles neighborhood of Panorama City. Gilliam attended Birmingham High School. During high school, he began to avidly read Mad magazine, then edited by Harvey Kurtzman, which would later influence Gilliam's work.

Gilliam graduated from Occidental College in 1962, where he was a member of the California Epsilon chapter of Sigma Alpha Epsilon, with a Bachelor of Arts in political science.

== Career ==
=== 1965–1969: Animation and move to England ===
Gilliam began his career as an animator and strip cartoonist. One of his early photographic strips for the US magazine Help! featured future Python cast member John Cleese. When Help! folded, Gilliam went to Europe. Moving to England, he animated sequences for the children's series Do Not Adjust Your Set which he worked on from 1968 to 1969, and which also featured Eric Idle, Terry Jones, and Michael Palin.

=== 1969–1974: Monty Python's Flying Circus ===
Gilliam was a member of Monty Python's Flying Circus from its outset, credited at first as an animator (his name was listed separately after the other five in the closing credits) and later as a full member. His cartoons linked the show's sketches together and defined the group's visual language in other media, such as LP and book covers and the title sequences of their films. His animations mix his own art, characterised by soft gradients and odd, bulbous shapes, with backgrounds and moving cutouts from antique photographs, mostly from the Victorian era.

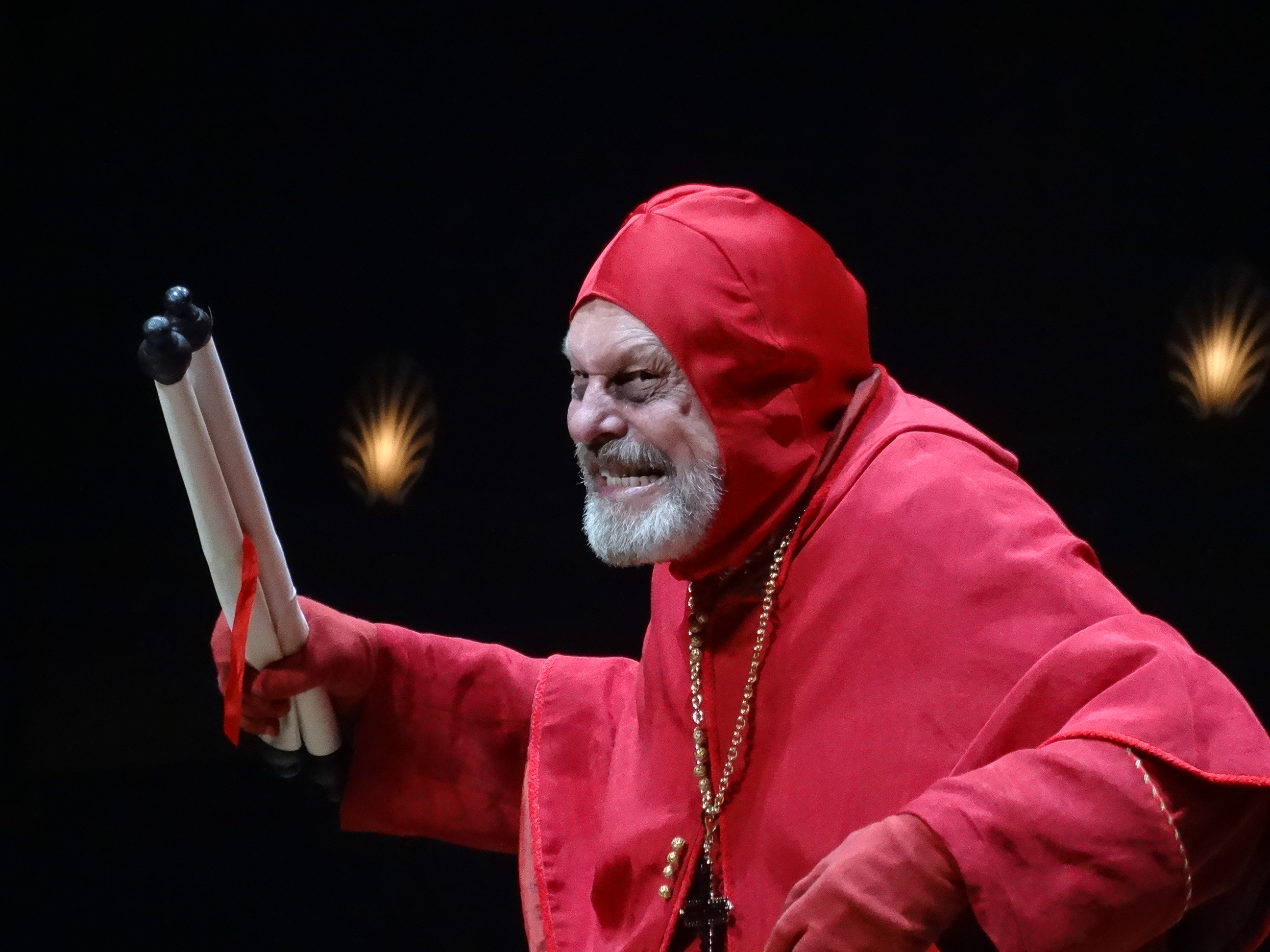
Gilliam as Cardinal Fang in "The Spanish Inquisition" sketch during the Python reunion, Monty Python Live (Mostly), in 2014

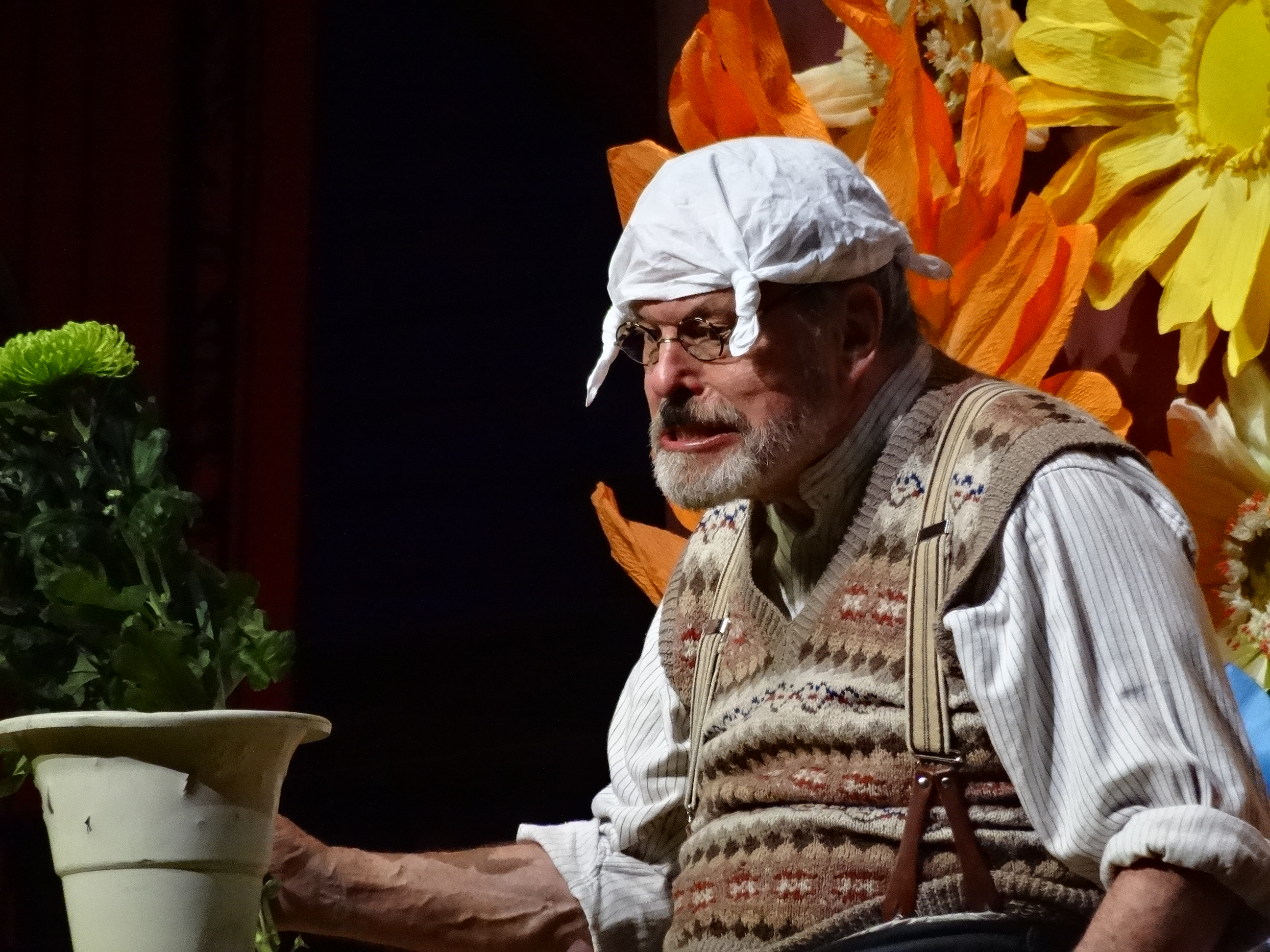
A character of limited intelligence and vocabulary, Gumby (played by Gilliam) flower arranging at the 2014 reunion. The Gumbys were part of the Pythons' satire on 1970s television condescendingly encouraging more involvement from the "man in the street".

He also appeared in several sketches, though he rarely had main roles and did considerably less acting in the sketches. Gilliam did, however, have some notable sketch roles, such as Cardinal Fang of the Spanish Inquisition; the bespectacled commenter who said, "I can't add anything to that!" in the sketch "Election Night Special"; Kevin Garibaldi, the brat on the couch shouting "I want more beans!" in the sketch "Most Awful Family in Britain 1974" (episode 45); the Screaming Queen in a cape and mask in "The Visitors"; and Percy Bysshe Shelley in "Ant Poetry Reading". More frequently, he played parts that no one else wanted to play, generally because they required a lot of makeup or uncomfortable costumes, such as a recurring knight in armour who ended sketches by walking on and hitting one of the other characters over the head with a plucked chicken. He also designed the covers of most of the Monty Python albums, including Another Monty Python Record, The Monty Python Matching Tie and Handkerchief, Monty Python Live at Drury Lane, and all of their later film soundtrack albums.

Reacting to a 2018 commentary of the controller of BBC comedy commissioning Shane Allen reflecting about the Monty Python troupe by saying "If you're going to assemble a team now it's not going to be six Oxbridge white blokes. It's going to be a diverse range of people who reflect the modern world", Gilliam told during a press conference at the Karlovy Vary festival that the statement "made [him] cry: the idea that no longer six white Oxbridge men can make a comedy show. Now we need one of this, one of that, everybody represented... This is bullshit. I no longer want to be a white male, I don't want to be blamed for everything wrong in the world: I tell the world now I'm a black lesbian... My name is Loretta and I'm a BLT, a black lesbian in transition.", the name "Loretta" referencing a character played by Eric Idle in Monty Python's Life of Brian.

=== 1975–1983: Transitional years ===
In 1975, Gilliam began his career as a director by co-directing Monty Python and the Holy Grail with Terry Jones. Gilliam was responsible for photography and also appeared as both Patsy and the Old Man from Scene 24, while Jones guided the actors' performances. It was the only Python film directed by Gilliam, though he continued to act in their subsequent projects.

As Python started to take longer breaks between projects following Monty Python and the Holy Grail, Gilliam became a solo filmmaker, building upon the experience he had acquired. In 1977, he directed his first film outside the group, Jabberwocky, also a comedy set in the Middle Ages. It featured Python member Michael Palin in the lead role, and was based on the poem of the same name. In 1978, he published Animations of Mortality, an illustrated, tongue-in-cheek, semi-autobiographical how-to guide to his animation techniques and the visual language in them.

Gilliam served as art director on Monty Python's Life of Brian, Terry Jones having taken on sole directing duties. Gilliam made Time Bandits in 1981. Following directing the short film The Crimson Permanent Assurance, which opened showings of Monty Python's The Meaning of Life, Python effectively ceased working together, and Gilliam pursued his career as a filmmaker.

=== 1984–1998: Trilogies and critical success ===
The "Trilogy of Imagination", written by Gilliam, about "the ages of man", consisted of Time Bandits (1981), Brazil (1985), and The Adventures of Baron Munchausen (1988). All are about the "craziness of our awkwardly ordered society and the desire to escape it through whatever means possible." All three films focus on these struggles and attempts to escape them through imagination: Time Bandits through the eyes of a child, Brazil through the eyes of a man in his thirties, and Munchausen through the eyes of an elderly man. In the summer of 1986, he cut ties with Arnon Milchan and 20th Century Fox and started directing Munchausen through his own new Prominent Films banner independently.

In the 1990s, Gilliam directed a trilogy of Americana: The Fisher King (1991), 12 Monkeys (1995), and Fear and Loathing in Las Vegas (1998), which took place on North American soil and, while still surreal, had fewer fantastical plots than his previous trilogy.

=== 1999–2009 ===
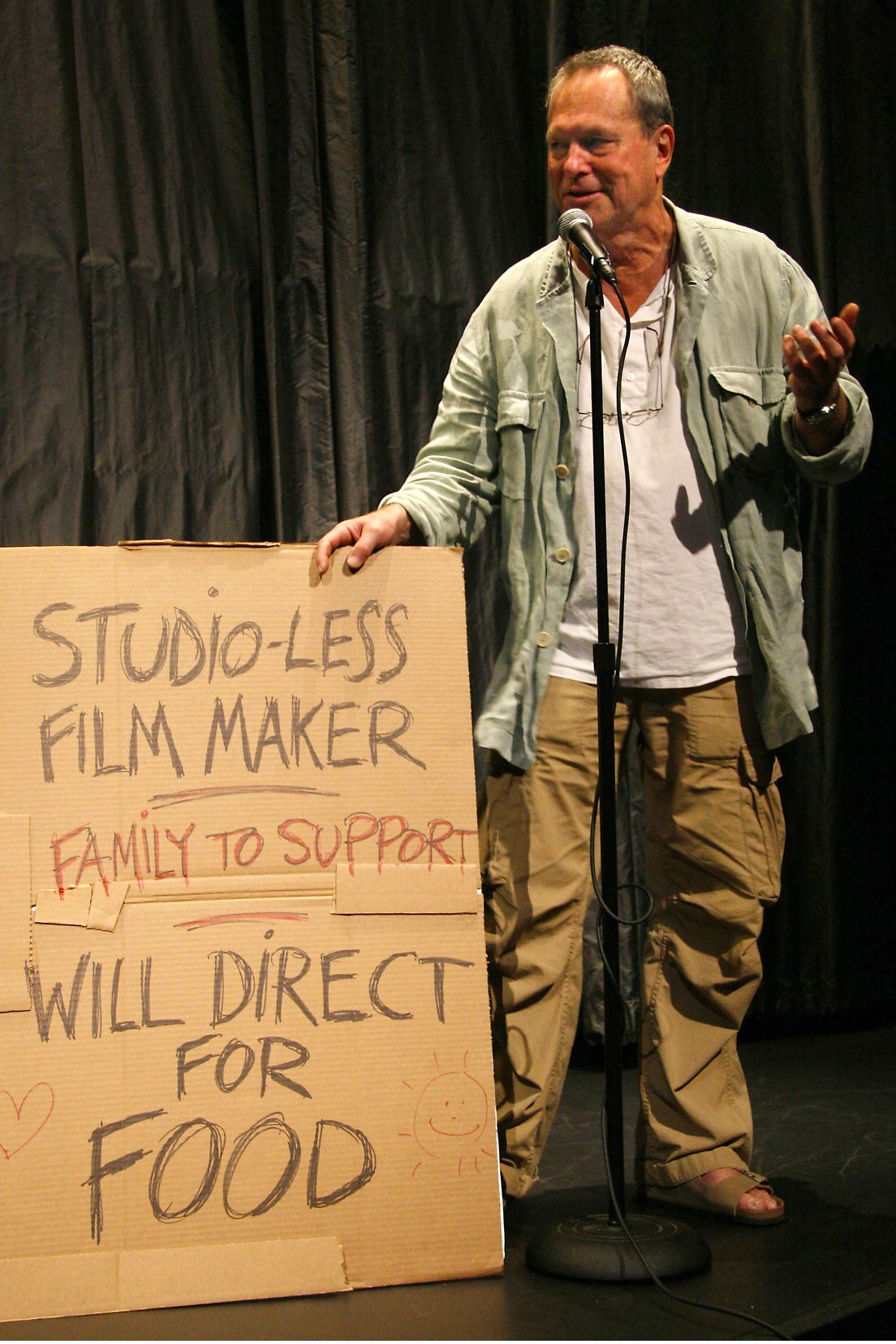
Gilliam at an IFC Center event on 4 October 2006

In 1999, Gilliam attempted to film The Man Who Killed Don Quixote, which was budgeted at US$32.1 million, making it among the highest-budgeted films to use only European financing; but in the first week of shooting, the actor playing Don Quixote (Jean Rochefort) suffered a herniated disc, and a flood severely damaged the set. The film was cancelled, resulting in an insurance claim of US$15 million. Despite the cancellation, the aborted project did yield the 2002 documentary Lost in La Mancha, produced from film from a second crew that had been hired by Gilliam to document the making of Quixote. After the cancellation, both Gilliam and the film's co-lead, Johnny Depp, wanted to revive the project. The insurance company involved in the failed first attempt withheld the rights to the screenplay for several years with the production on hold until 2008.

Following the failure of The Man Who Killed Don Quixote, J. K. Rowling, the author of the Harry Potter series and a fan of Gilliam's work, advocated for him to direct Harry Potter and the Philosopher's Stone in 2000, but Warner Bros. ultimately chose Chris Columbus for the job.

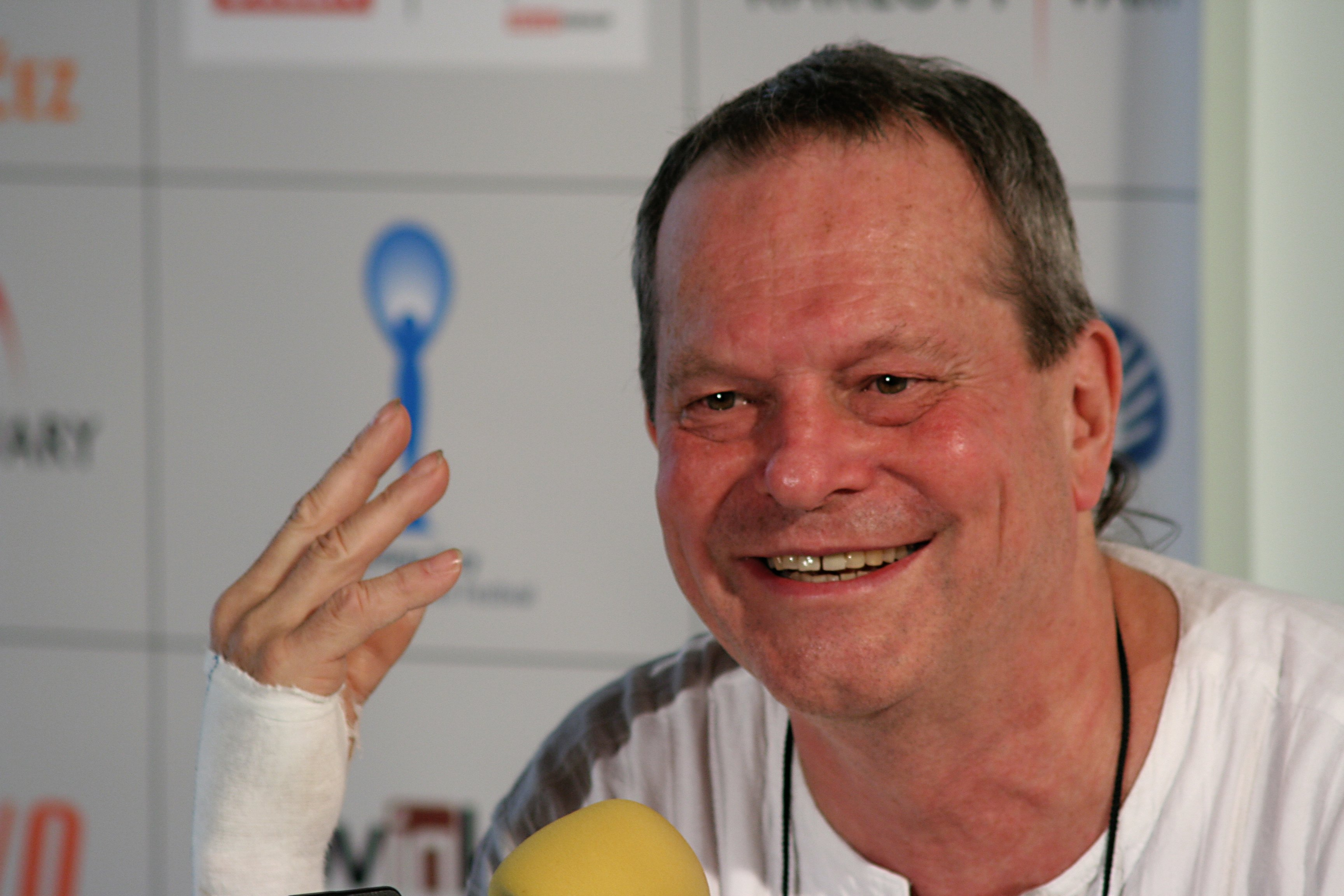
Gilliam at the 41st Karlovy Vary International Film Festival, April 2006

In 2002, Gilliam directed a series of television advertisements called "Secret Tournament". Part of Nike's 2002 FIFA World Cup campaign, the advertisements feature a secret three-on-three tournament between the world's best football players, including Ronaldo, Ronaldinho and Thierry Henry, who are inside a huge tanker ship. The advertisements are accompanied with a remixed version of the Elvis Presley song "A Little Less Conversation".

In 2005, Gilliam released The Brothers Grimm, followed later in the year by Tideland. In 2006, Gilliam made his debut as theatre director by directing the stage show Slava's Diabolo, created and staged by the Russian clown artist Slava Polunin. The show combined Polunin's clown style, characterised by deep nonverbal expression and interaction with the audience, with Gilliam's rich visuals and surrealistic imagery. The show premiered at the Noga Hall of the Gesher Theatre in Jaffa, Tel Aviv, Israel.

In January 2007, Gilliam announced that he had been working on a new project with his writing partner Charles McKeown. One day later, the fansite Dreams reported that the new project was titled The Imaginarium of Doctor Parnassus; the following October, Dreams confirmed that this would be Gilliam's next project and was slated to star Christopher Plummer and Tom Waits. Production began in December 2007 in London. On 22 January 2008, production of the film was disrupted following the death of Heath Ledger in New York City. Variety reported that Ledger's involvement had been a "key factor" in the film's financing. Production was suspended indefinitely by 24 January, but in February the actors Johnny Depp, Jude Law, and Colin Farrell signed on to continue Ledger's role, transforming into multiple incarnations of his character in the "magical" world of the film. Thanks to this arrangement the principal photography was completed on 15 April 2008, on schedule. During the filming, Gilliam was accidentally hit by a bus and suffered a broken back. The film had successful screenings including a premiere at the 62nd Cannes Film Festival. The UK release for the film was scheduled for 6 June 2009, but was pushed back to 16 October 2009. The USA release was on 25 December 2009. Eventually, this $30 million-budgeted film had grossed more than $60 million in worldwide theatrical release and received two Academy Award nominations. The film's end credit states that the film is dedicated to the memories of Ledger and William Vince. Depp, Farrell, and Law donated their proceeds from the film to Ledger's daughter.

=== 2010–2019 ===
Gilliam made his opera debut at London's English National Opera (ENO) in May 2011, directing The Damnation of Faust, by Hector Berlioz. On 16 September 2012, the production opened at the Vlaamse Opera in Ghent, Belgium, in the opera's original French-language version and received praise from critics and audiences alike. After a number of performances in Ghent, the production moved to the opera house in Antwerp for a sold-out run of performances.

In July 2012, Gilliam revealed plans for a film which would be shot in Bucharest, Romania. He denied that it would be Don Quixote but refused to give any further details. On 13 August 2012, this project was announced to be The Zero Theorem, set to start shooting in Bucharest on 22 October, produced by Dean Zanuck (son of the late Richard D. Zanuck, who was originally to produce the film in 2009), with worldwide sales handled by Voltage Pictures, Toronto, and starring the Academy Award–winner Christoph Waltz in the lead (replacing Billy Bob Thornton, who had been attached to the project in 2009). The Zero Theorem premiered at the 70th Venice International Film Festival on 2 September 2013.

In June 2014, Gilliam followed up on his success with Faust with a new ENO production of another opera by Berlioz, the rarely performed Benvenuto Cellini.

After regaining the rights to the screenplay of The Man Who Killed Don Quixote, Gilliam restarted preproduction in 2008, with Johnny Depp still attached to the project. The film was to be reshot completely, with Rochefort's role recast. Michael Palin reportedly entered into talks with Gilliam about stepping in for Rochefort and playing Don Quixote. However, Gilliam revealed on the Canadian talk show The Hour on 17 December 2009 that Robert Duvall had been cast to play Quixote, before the film was postponed once again. In January 2014, Gilliam wrote on Facebook that "Dreams of Don Quixote have begun again". At the Cannes Film Festival in 2016, it was confirmed that The Man Who Killed Don Quixote was going to be made, with Michael Palin and Adam Driver in starring roles. In March 2017, filming finally began, with Driver and Jonathan Pryce starring. On 4 June 2017, Gilliam announced that the shooting of the film was complete. The film premiered on 19 May 2018, as the closing film of the 2018 Cannes Film Festival (where it received a standing ovation), and was released in French theatres the same day.

=== 2020–present ===
His production of Into the Woods, which he co-directed with Leah Hausman, premiered at the Theatre Royal, Bath in August 2022 to positive reviews.

In 2021, his production of Into the Woods was set to play at The Old Vic, a prominent London theatre. The production was cancelled and moved to an unrelated theatre, the Theatre Royal. This was reportedly due to "staff unrest at ... Gilliam's involvement". Gilliam was reportedly asked to apologize for his #MeToo comments, but "further offended staff" with his online recommendation of Dave Chappelle's Netflix special. The Old Vic said in a statement "Ahead of any season announcement, senior management at the Old Vic would meet with the directors who are programmed to work in the season as a matter of course to discuss our culture and values. This happened with the co-directors of Into the Woods, Terry Gilliam and Leah Hausman."

Gilliam stated on Facebook "The Old Vic allowed itself to be intimidated into cancelling our production ... by a small group of closed-minded, humour-averse ideologues on their staff ... as if they are victims of some cruel injustice desperately fighting for their freedom! My unspeakable crime was recommending my Facebook followers to watch a Netflix special by a brilliant and provocative American comedian". Gilliam later specified that Chappelle was the comedian he recommended.

In June 2024, Gilliam announced the making of a new film called The Carnival at the End of Days. It was to star Depp, reuniting with Gilliam, along with Bridges, Driver, and Jason Momoa. Production was reported to begin in April 2025 according to Gilliam. Johnny Depp was to play Satan, and Jeff Bridges was to play God in the film. In an interview in July of 2025 Gilliam stated that if the film was ever to be made it would require an extensive rewrite, as it no longer fit with the current world. In an October 2025 interview at the 58th Sitges Film Festival, Gilliam announced that he has shifted his focus away from Carnival: At the End of Days to resurrect his long dormant project The Defective Detective, as he is "more interested in a script I wrote thirty years ago for Paramount. There are new people at the studio now, and I have a new agent in Hollywood, and I'm trying to move the project forward. I'd like to direct it before I die. It's called The Defective Detective and it should be my last film."

In June 2024, Gilliam has also been awarded an Honorary Cristal by the Annecy Film Festival, a lifetime achievement award for his contribution to cinema and animation in particular.

==== Other projects ====
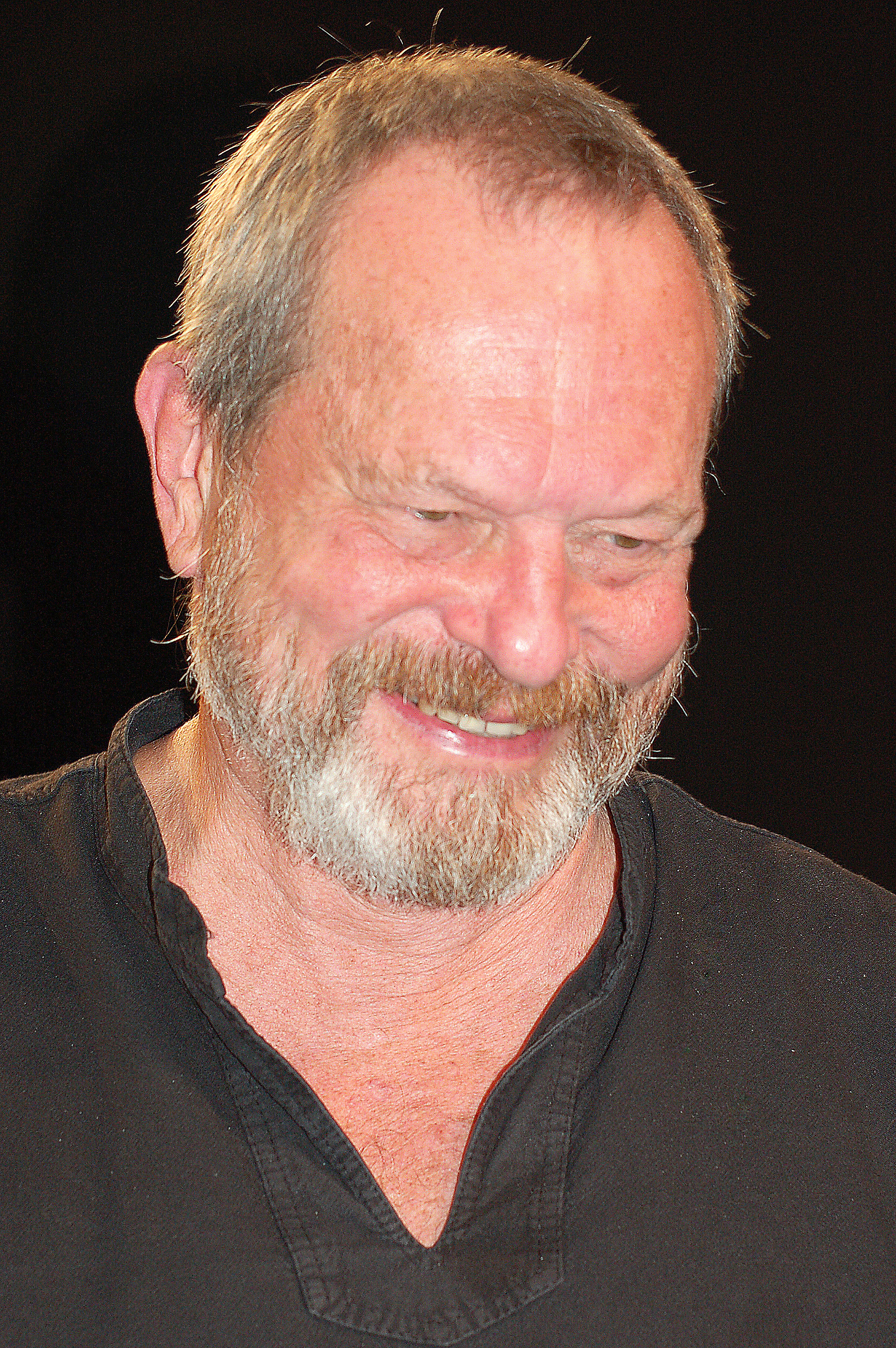
Gilliam at the 36th Deauville American Films Festival in 2010

In addition to film projects as director, Gilliam has been involved with developing projects for other artists and mediums. On 16 December 2010, Variety reported that Gilliam was to "godfather" a film called 1884, described as an animated steampunk parody of George Orwell's Nineteen Eighty-Four, with several former Pythons lending their voices to the project; Gilliam was to be credited as "creative advisor". On 15 May 2013, Gilliam was signed on to executive produce The White Circus, a "dark fairy tale" adventure-romance that was to star Chloë Grace Moretz, Asa Butterfield, Andrea Riseborough and Christian Friedel.

Fifteen years after the publication of Gilliam's Animations of Mortality, between the release of the CD-ROM game Monty Python's Complete Waste of Time in 1994, which used many of Gilliam's animation templates, and the making of Gilliam's film Fear and Loathing in Las Vegas (1998), Gilliam was in negotiations with Enteractive, a software company, to tentatively release in the autumn of 1996 a CD-ROM under the same title as his 1978 book, containing all of his thousands of 1970s animation templates as licence-free clip arts for people to create their own flash animations, but the project hovered in limbo for years, probably because Enteractive was about to downsize greatly in mid-1996 and changed its focus from CD-ROM multimedia presentations to internet business solutions and web hosting in 1997 (in the introduction to their 2004 book Terry Gilliam: Interviews, David Sterrit and Lucille Rhodes claimed that the internet had overwhelmed the "computer-communications market" and gave this as the reason that the Animations of Mortality CD-ROM never materialised). Around the time of Gilliam's film The Imaginarium of Doctor Parnassus (2009), the project had changed into the idea of releasing his 1970s animation templates as a licence-free download of Adobe After Effects or similar files.

== Personal life ==
Gilliam has been married to British makeup artist Maggie Weston since 1973. She worked on Monty Python's Flying Circus, many of the Python films, and Gilliam's films up to The Adventures of Baron Munchausen. They have three children: Amy Rainbow (born 1978), Holly Dubois (born October 1980), and Harry Thunder (born 3 April 1988), all of whom have also appeared in or worked on several of his films. Since 2013, Holly Gilliam is the manager of Monty Python through her management company HDG Projects.

In 1968, Gilliam obtained British citizenship. He held dual American and British citizenship for the next 38 years, until he renounced his American citizenship in January 2006. In an interview with Der Tagesspiegel, he described the action as a protest against then-President George W. Bush, and in an earlier interview with The A.V. Club, he also indicated that it was related to concerns about future tax liability for his wife and children. As a result of renouncing his citizenship, Gilliam was permitted to spend 30 days each year in the United States over the next ten years, "less than any European". Holly followed suit, renouncing her American citizenship in 2017.

He maintains a residence in Italy near the Umbria–Tuscany border. He has been instrumental in establishing the annual Umbria Film Festival, held in the nearby town of Montone. Gilliam also resides in Highgate, London.

=== Comments and controversies ===
As some of Terry Gilliam's opinions have been met with criticism, the director clarifies that his comments are to be taken as jokes, saying "when I do interviews I'm playing around, talking, joking. I'm not on a soapbox, I'm not trying to proclaim a truth, just throwing out ideas. You say something and it's a headline and then... boom! How do we bring back context and nuance into the discussion?"

Gilliam called #MeToo a "witch hunt", saying " I really feel there were a lot of people, decent people, or mildly irritating people, who were getting hammered. That's wrong. I don't like mob mentality.". He also said, "There are many victims in Harvey [Weinstein]'s life, and I feel sympathy for them, but then, Hollywood is full of very ambitious people who are adults and they make choices." He related the movement to "mob rule", taking as example the way it handled Matt Damon: "I feel sorry for someone like Matt Damon, who is a decent human being (...) He came out and said all men are not rapists, and he got beaten to death. Come on, this is crazy!". Gilliam did, however, call Weinstein "a monster".

Terry Gilliam explains his defiance of activists as such: "Activists, I'm not a great fan of, because they're all fighting crusades that probably don't need fighting, because the people they're fighting for are getting on with their lives. I refer to most of them as neo-Calvinists – a very narrow point of view, and they're very self-righteous, and if you don't agree with them, you're then a transphobe, a homophobe... No! I'm a phobe-phobe! I hate hate!"

=== Charitable activities ===
Gilliam has been involved with a number of charitable and humanitarian causes. In 2009, he became a board member of Videre Est Credere (Latin for "to see is to believe"), a UK human rights charity. Videre describes itself as giving "local activists the equipment, training and support needed to safely capture compelling video evidence of human rights violations. This captured footage is verified, analysed and then distributed to those who can create change." He participates alongside movie producer Uri Fruchtmann, music producer Brian Eno and former executive director of Greenpeace UK John Sauven.

He contributed as a cartoonist to "The Great British Colouring Book", a coloring book given to refugee children coming into Great Britain and created by the Professional Cartoonists Organisation as a response to Immigration Minister Robert Jenrick ordering to paint over cartoon murals at Dover's Kent asylum intake unit, a reception centre for unaccompanied child asylum seekers.

== Filmography ==
As director:

Year	Title	Distributor
1975	Monty Python and the Holy Grail (Note: directing credit shared with Terry Jones)	EMI Films / Cinema 5
1977	Jabberwocky	Columbia Pictures / Warner Bros.
1981	Time Bandits	Embassy Pictures
1985	Brazil	Universal Pictures / 20th Century Fox
1988	The Adventures of Baron Munchausen	Columbia Pictures
1991	The Fisher King	TriStar Pictures
1995	12 Monkeys	Universal Pictures
1998	Fear and Loathing in Las Vegas	Universal Pictures
2005	The Brothers Grimm	Dimension Films
2005	Tideland	Revolver Entertainment / ThinkFilm
2009	The Imaginarium of Doctor Parnassus	Lionsgate UK
2013	The Zero Theorem	Stage 6 Films
2018	The Man Who Killed Don Quixote	Sparky Pictures

== Accolades ==
Awards and nominations received by films directed by Gilliam
Year	Title	Academy Awards		BAFTA Awards		Golden Globe Awards	
Year	Title	Nominations	Wins	Nominations	Wins	Nominations	Wins
1983	Monty Python's The Meaning of Life			1			
1985	Brazil	2		2	2		
1988	The Adventures of Baron Munchausen	4		4	3		
1991	The Fisher King	5	1	2		5	2
1995	12 Monkeys	2				1	1
2009	The Imaginarium of Doctor Parnassus	2		2			
Total		15	1	11	5	6	3

Directed Academy Award performances
Under Gilliam's direction, these actors have received Academy Award nominations (and one win) for their performances in their respective roles.

Year	Performer	Film	Result
Academy Award for Best Actor
1991	Robin Williams	The Fisher King	Nominated
Academy Award for Best Supporting Actor
1995	Brad Pitt	12 Monkeys	Nominated
Academy Award for Best Supporting Actress
1991	Mercedes Ruehl	The Fisher King	Won

== Bibliography ==
- Gilliam, Terry; Thompson, Ben (2015). Gilliamesque. Harper Design. ISBN 978-0-06-238074-6.
- Gilliam, Terry; Sterritt, David; Rhodes, Lucille (April 2004). Terry Gilliam: interviews. Univ. Press of Mississippi. ISBN 978-1-57806-624-7.
- Gilliam, Terry; Christie, Ian (1999). Gilliam on Gilliam. Faber and Faber. ISBN 978-0-571-20280-5.
- McCabe, Bob; Gilliam, Terry (30 September 1999). Dark Knights And Holy Fools: The Art And Films of Terry Gilliam. Diane Pub Co. ISBN 978-0-7567-9080-6.
- Wilmut, Roger (1980). From fringe to flying circus: celebrating a unique generation of comedy, 1960–1980. Eyre Methuen. ISBN 978-0-413-46950-2.
