= Python (Monty) Pictures =

British entertainment company

Python (Monty) Pictures Limited is composed of the four surviving members of the main Monty Python team, who now serve as the directors. Python (Monty) Pictures was incorporated in 1973 and now manages ongoing activities resulting from their previous work together. In the accounts return, the company describes its activities as the 'exploitation of television and cinematographic productions'. In the last financial year for which accounts are available (to March 2004), the company's turnover was £4.9 million.

When Monty Python's Flying Circus was shown in the U.S. by ABC in their Wide World of Entertainment slot in 1975, the episodes were re-edited to allow time for commercials, thus losing the continuity and flow intended in the originals. When ABC refused to stop screening the series in this form, the Pythons took them to court. Initially the court ruled that their artistic rights had indeed been violated, but refused to stop the ABC broadcasts as this would cause "financial damage" to ABC. However, on appeal, the team gained control over all subsequent U.S. broadcasts of its programmes. The case also led to them gaining the foreign rights to all Python shows from the BBC, once their original contracts ended at the end of 1980 (a unique arrangement at the time).

As revealed in The Madness and Misadventures of Munchausen (included on the bonus DVD of the 20th Anniversary Edition of Python member Terry Gilliam's 1988 film The Adventures of Baron Munchausen), Python Pictures was to originally bring in part of the funding for Munchausen but eventually the deal didn't come to fruition.
