= Maggie Weston (make-up artist) =

British makeup artist

- Born: Margaret Diane Weston; January 1948 (age 78)
- Occupation: Make-up artist
- Years active: 1974–1988
- Spouse: Terry Gilliam (m. 1973)
- Children: 3

Margaret Diane "Maggie" Weston (born January 1948) is a British former makeup artist. She is married to Terry Gilliam.

She was nominated for an Academy Award in the category Best Makeup and Hairstyling for the film The Adventures of Baron Munchausen. She also won the BAFTA Film Award for Best Makeup in 1990 at the 43rd British Academy Film Awards.

== Selected filmography ==
- The Adventures of Baron Munchausen (1988)
