= Terry Gilliam filmography =

American-born British actor and filmmaker Terry Gilliam, known for his work with the Monty Python comedy troupe, has directed 13 feature films and five short films, and written for several additional films and television series. He received the 1988 BAFTA Award along with other Monty Python members for Outstanding British Contribution to Cinema, and in 2009 received the BAFTA Fellowship for lifetime achievement.

== Filmography ==
Year	Title				
Year	Title	Director	Writer	Producer	Notes
1975	Monty Python and the Holy Grail	Yes	Yes	No	Co-directed with Terry Jones
1977	Jabberwocky	Yes	Yes	No	
1981	Time Bandits	Yes	Yes	Yes	
1985	Brazil	Yes	Yes	No	
1988	The Adventures of Baron Munchausen	Yes	Yes	No	
1991	The Fisher King	Yes	No	No	
1995	12 Monkeys	Yes	No	No	
1998	Fear and Loathing in Las Vegas	Yes	Yes	No	
2005	The Brothers Grimm	Yes	Uncredited	No	
2005	Tideland	Yes	Yes	No	
2009	The Imaginarium of Doctor Parnassus	Yes	Yes	Yes	
2013	The Zero Theorem	Yes	No	No	
2018	The Man Who Killed Don Quixote	Yes	Yes	No	

=== Writer or producer only ===
Year	Title			
Year	Title	Writer	Producer	Notes
1971	And Now for Something Completely Different	Yes	No	Also director of the animated segments
1979	Monty Python's Life of Brian	Yes	No	
1982	Monty Python Live at the Hollywood Bowl	Yes	No	Concert film
1983	Monty Python's The Meaning of Life	Yes	No	Also director of the animation sequence
2005	The Piano Tuner of Earthquakes	No	Yes	

=== Short film ===
Year	Title	Director	Writer	Producer	Ref(s)
1974	Miracle of Flight	Yes	Yes	Yes	
1979	Story Time	Yes	Yes	No	
1983	The Crimson Permanent Assurance	Yes	Yes	No	
2010	The Legend of Hallowdega	Yes	No	No	
2011	The Wholly Family	Yes	Yes	No	
2022	Amok	No	No	Executive	

== Television ==
Year	Title	Writer	Producer	Notes
1968	Do Not Adjust Your Set	Yes	No	Additional writing material
1968	Marty	Yes	No	
1968	Broaden Your Mind	Yes	No	
1969–1974	Monty Python's Flying Circus	Yes	No	Also animator
2015–2018	12 Monkeys	No	No	Based on his film of the same name.
2024	Time Bandits	No	Executive	Based on his film of the same name.

=== Advertisements ===
- MTV "Boogeyman" (1987)
- Secret Tournament (2002)
- The Rematch (2002)

== Acting roles ==
Year	Title		
Year	Title	Role	Notes
1969–1974	Monty Python's Flying Circus	Various roles	44 episodes
1971	And Now for Something Completely Different	Various roles	
1972	Monty Python's Fliegender Zirkus	Various roles	Television film
1975	Monty Python and the Holy Grail	Various roles	
1977	Jabberwocky	Man with Rock	Cameo
1979	Monty Python's Life of Brian	Various roles	
1979	Story Time	Narrator (voice)	
1982	Monty Python Live at the Hollywood Bowl	Various roles	Concert film
1983	Monty Python's The Meaning of Life	Various roles	
1983	The Crimson Permanent Assurance	Workman	Uncredited cameo
1985	Brazil	Smoking Man at Shangri-La Towers	Uncredited cameo
1985	Spies Like Us	Dr. Imhaus	
1988	The Adventures of Baron Munchausen	Irritating Singer Inside Fish	Uncredited cameo
1996	Monty Python & the Quest for the Holy Grail	Various roles (voice)	Video game
1997	Monty Python's The Meaning of Life	Various roles (voice)	Video game
2006	Locked Out	Fake Baby	Cameo
2010	Not the Messiah (He's a Very Naughty Boy)	Not an Individual/Mexican/Mountie	Concert film
2010	The Legend of Hallowdega	Senior citizen in photo	Uncredited cameo
2011	The Monster of Nix	The Ranger (voice)	Short film
2012	I Rec U	Dr. Therieux	
2012	A Liar's Autobiography: The Untrue Story of Monty Python's Graham Chapman	Various roles (voice)	
2012	The Unfinished Swan	The King (voice)	Video game
2013	9 Month Stretch	Charles Meatson	Cameo
2014	Monty Python Live (Mostly)	Various roles	Concert film
2015	Jupiter Ascending	Seal and Signet Minister	Cameo
2015	Absolutely Anything	Nasty Alien (voice)	
2018	The Man Who Killed Don Quixote	Giant 2 (voice)	Cameo
2020	Bye Bye Morons	The Hunter	Cameo

== See also ==
- Terry Gilliam's unrealized projects
