= The Carnival at the End of Days =

Unproduced film project by Terry Gilliam

- Directed by: Terry Gilliam
- Screenplay by: Terry Gilliam; Christopher Brett Bailey
- Produced by: Terry Gilliam; Amy Gilliam; Andrea Iervolino; Guglielmo Marchetti; Elijah Wood; Daniel Noah; Lisa Whalen
- Starring: Johnny Depp; Jeff Bridges; Asa Butterfield; Emma Laird; Adam Driver; Jason Momoa; Tom Waits
- Cinematography: Nicola Pecorini
- Production companies: The Andrea Iervolino Company; Notorious Pictures
- Distributed by: Notorious Pictures (Italy)
- Countries: United Kingdom; United States; Italy
- Languages: English; Italian
- Budget: $30–40 million

The Carnival at the End of Days (also known as The Apocalypse Fair: Fun for All of Those Who Enjoy Being Offended, Carnival: At the End of Days or simply Carnival) is an unfinished live-action/animated hybrid independent apocalyptic fantasy black comedy film that was to have been directed by Terry Gilliam, from a screenplay co-written with Christopher Brett Bailey. It was to star Johnny Depp as Satan as he tries to save humanity from the Last Judgment of God (to be portrayed by Jeff Bridges) by presenting the new Adam and Eve (portrayed by Asa Butterfield and Emma Laird, respectively). The cast also included Adam Driver, Jason Momoa and Tom Waits.

Positioned as Gilliam's directorial swan song, the film was developed in reaction to the COVID-19 pandemic, but ultimately abandoned due to its subject matter; with the humor deemed unfashionable by Gilliam, who then suggested he would rewrite the script to be more relevant. Additionally, the project had struggled to gather financing until early 2025, when Italian producer and entrepreneur Andrea Iervolino and Notorious Pictures president Guglielmo Marchetti boarded the production. Despite their initial commitments, both parties would depart mid-way through that same year.

== Premise ==
After God decides to end the human race for desecrating the garden he created, Satan tries to salvage his job of sending people to Hell. To accomplish this, Satan attempts to convince God to spare humanity by presenting the new Adam and Eve. The film was to also feature the Four Horsemen of the Apocalypse and the Rapture.

== Cast ==
- Johnny Depp as Satan
- Jeff Bridges as God
- Asa Butterfield as Adam
- Emma Laird as Eve
- Adam Driver
- Jason Momoa
- Tom Waits

== Production ==
=== Development ===
In July 2021, during the 12th Odesa International Film Festival in Odesa, Ukraine, Terry Gilliam revealed that he was working on a new script for a film in which "God finally decides to destroy humanity – for desecrating the beautiful garden he created." In February 2022, he stated that he conceived the overall idea while in self-isolation in Italy, during the COVID-19 pandemic. He had previously developed a similar black comedy screenplay in 1996 about God destroying humanity for a sequel to Time Bandits (1981) before the project was shelved for various reasons. In March 2022, at the 25th British Screen Festival in Nîmes, France, Gilliam estimated that the budget for this new film would be roughly around $30 million. In December 2022, at the 27th Capri Hollywood International Film Festival, Gilliam teased that he had the "perfect actor in mind" to play Satan.

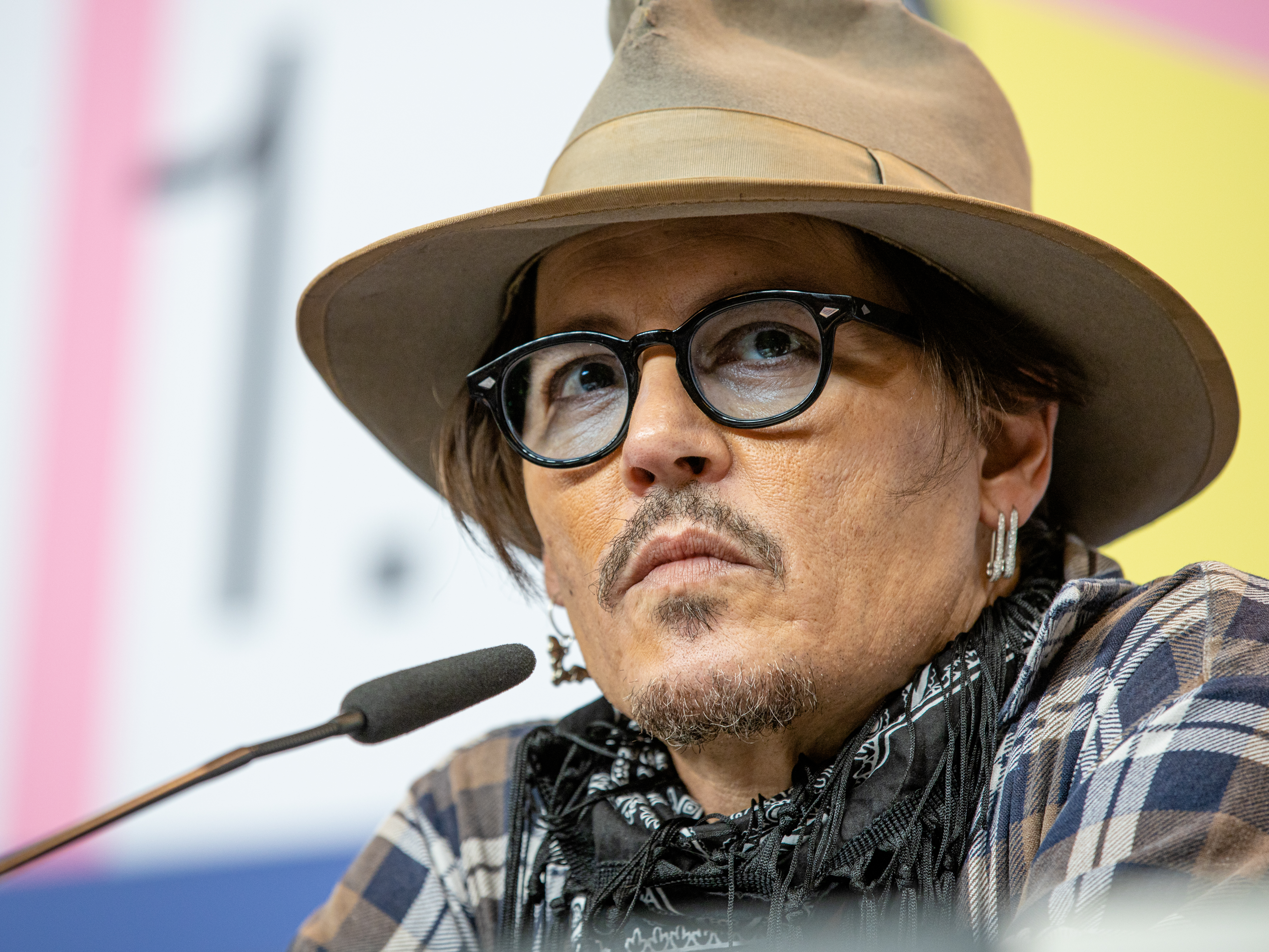
Depp was to portray the main protagonist; Satan

In a February 2023 interview with BBC Radio, Gilliam revealed he co-wrote the screenplay with Christopher Brett Bailey, who previously scripted the independent film Dream Agency (2022). In April 2023, Gilliam revealed that the film was titled The Carnival at the End of Days, and would feature the Four Horsemen of the Apocalypse. In June 2023 however, while at the Ora! Fest in Monopoli, Italy, Gilliam referred to the film as The Apocalypse Fair, with the subtitle Fun for All of Those Who Enjoy Being Offended. He added, "The story is an opportunity to mock everything I can't stand, so much so that those who read the script told me: 'If Hollywood reads it, you'll never make a movie again.' But I am an old man now, an old white man, and if this world sucks, it is the fault of my kind. At this point in my life, I don't give a damn about the consequences." In October 2023, at the 15th Lumière Festival, Gilliam expressed his difficulties with securing financing for the project, jokingly requesting the phone number of multi-billionaire Elon Musk. In December 2023, Johnny Depp was reportedly in negotiations to star in the film as Satan, having previously worked with Gilliam on Fear and Loathing in Las Vegas (1998) and The Imaginarium of Doctor Parnassus (2009).

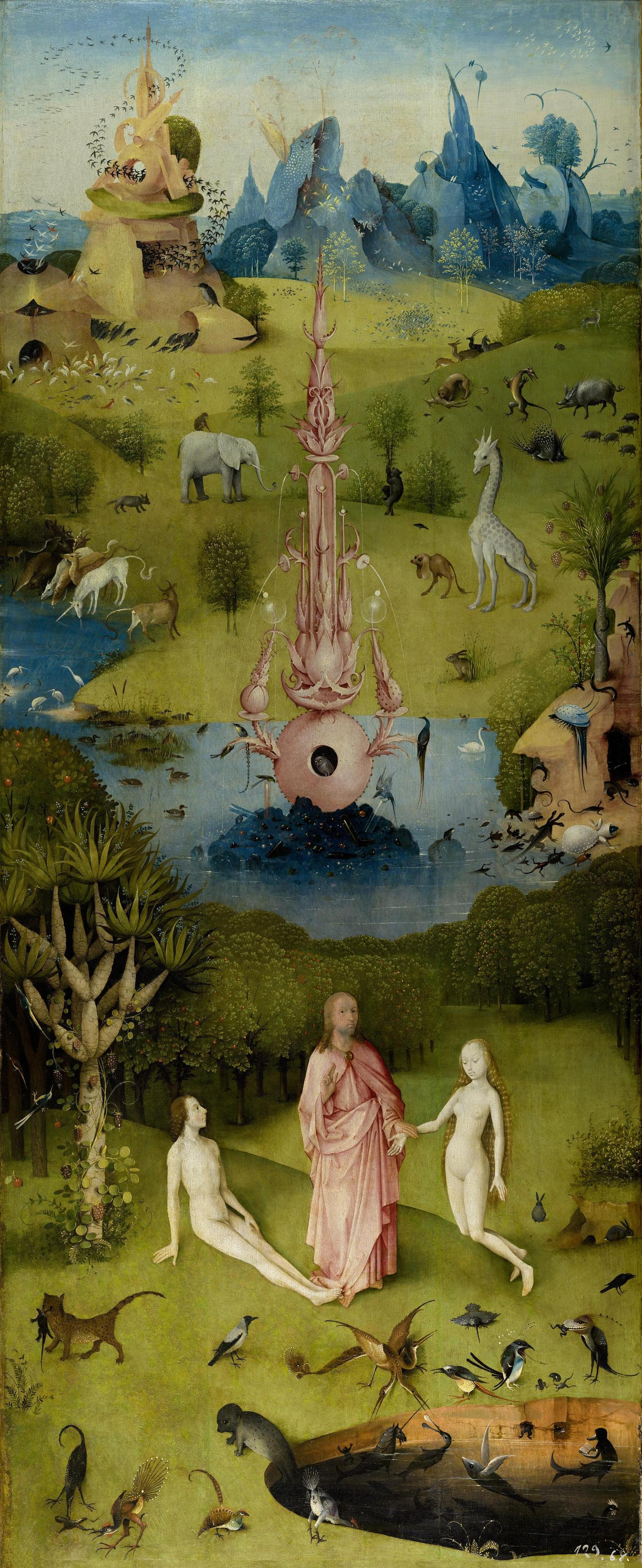
Left panel of The Garden of Earthly Delights (c. 1490–1510) by Hieronymus Bosch

In April 2024, Gilliam reunited with Depp for the United Kingdom premiere of Depp's film Jeanne du Barry (2023), further hinting at their collaboration on The Carnival at the End of Days. By June 2024, Depp was officially cast as Satan, while other previous Gilliam collaborators Jeff Bridges—who starred in The Fisher King (1991) and Tideland (2005)—and Adam Driver, who starred in The Man Who Killed Don Quixote (2018), joined the cast as God and in an undisclosed role, respectively, alongside Jason Momoa in an undisclosed role. It was indicated that the film would incorporate stop motion and CG animated sequences, primarily to depict God "as nature that can talk", alongside "fifteen animals". During the 64th Annecy Film Festival held the same month, Gilliam confirmed that the cast was finalized, that he was in the process of storyboarding, and that he believed the film would be his "swan song" as a director. In July 2024, at the 28th Umbria Film Festival in Montone, Italy, Gilliam announced that Asa Butterfield was cast as Adam. In September 2024, Gilliam once again stated that he was struggling to obtain the necessary funds, forcing him to compromise his vision. "I'm angry with myself for not being able to do it. Which is not always a bad thing. When I get angry, some interesting ideas come out [...] Maybe I'll start shooting it soon, albeit with a smaller budget," he suggested. Gilliam went on to add that he was "negotiating with the Saudis" to bankroll the project, and would be willing to shoot in Saudi Arabia if they covered the entirety of the cost.

By early February 2025, it was reported that Emma Laird was cast as Eve in the film, retitled Carnival: At the End of Days, while Guglielmo Marchetti of Notorious Pictures, Amy Gilliam and Andrea Iervolino would serve as producers, with the latter saying it is "one of the most expensive independent projects ever undertaken in cinematic history". Iervolino previously worked with Depp on Waiting for the Barbarians (2019), the Puffins franchise (2020–24) and Modì, Three Days on the Wing of Madness (2024), and with Driver on Ferrari (2023). After being shopped around at the European Film Market in Berlin, by the end of February 2025, the film was given an alternate title of Carnival, with a reported budget of $30–40 million. Marchetti announced that the interiors would be shot on Cinecittà soundstages, and that over 3,000 people in Italy would be employed in the production, with its original cast still intact.

However, by June 2025, Gilliam revealed during the 71st Taormina Film Fest in Sicily, Italy that the film was stuck in development limbo, saying, "I want to make an apocalyptic film, but everyone is very busy in Israel, in Iran... that's the problem". In a July 2025 interview with The Hollywood Reporter, he explained that the re-election of Donald Trump "fucked up the latest film I was working on. Because it was a satire about the last several years when things were going as they were. He's turned it upside down. So he's killed my movie. I had a subtitle that said: Great fun for all of those who enjoy taking offense. That was how I approached it. I think Trump has destroyed satire. I mean, how can you be satirical about what's going on in the way he's doing the world? I think I've got to rewrite a lot of it. I'm still trying to decide how to approach that". In the same interview, it was revealed that Tom Waits was cast in an undisclosed role, having previously worked with Gilliam on The Fisher King and The Imaginarium of Doctor Parnassus. In another interview with the British Film Institute that same month, Gilliam indicated the film lost its chief financiers, Iervolino and Marchetti, saying, "the film is free: I have signed no legal documents. If anybody wants to come on board, we're willing and waiting. Somebody give me the money".

=== Filming and release plans ===
Gilliam and Pecorini were to unite for their fifth feature together

Principal photography was variously set to commence in January 2025, in April 2025 at Cinecittà Studios in Rome, Italy, and on 7 April 2025, in Albuquerque, New Mexico. In March 2025, Gilliam's frequent cinematographer Nicola Pecorini was expected to serve as the film's director of photography.

The film was planned to be theatrically released in Italy by Notorious Pictures.

== Aftermath ==
In an October 2025 interview with John Morrish at the 7th Cheltenham International Film Festival, Gilliam revealed that the project was dead, saying, "I think that one is not gonna happen. This is probably the first time I publicly said that. So I'm a little worried about saying it — it probably will kill it". In a separate October 2025 interview at the 58th Sitges Film Festival, Gilliam announced that he had shifted his focus away from The Carnival at the End of Days to resurrect his long dormant project The Defective Detective, which he said "should be [his] last film."

== See also ==
- Terry Gilliam's unrealized projects
