= The Girl in the Spider's Web (soundtrack) =

2018 film soundtrack album

The Girl in the Spider's Web (Original Motion Picture Soundtrack)

Film score by Roque Baños
- Released: November 9, 2018
- Recorded: 2018
- Studio: Synchron Stage, Vienna, Austria
- Genre: Film score
- Length: 87:22
- Label: Sony Classical
- Producer: Roque Baños

Roque Baños chronology
The Man Who Killed Don Quixote (2018)	The Girl in the Spider's Web (2018)	Come Play (2020)

The Girl in the Spider's Web (Original Motion Picture Soundtrack) is the film score to the 2018 film The Girl in the Spider's Web directed by Fede Álvarez. It is the a soft reboot and sequel to the David Fincher-directorial The Girl with the Dragon Tattoo (2011) starring Claire Foy as Lisbeth Salander. The film score is composed by Roque Baños and was recorded at the Vienna Synchron Stage. It was released through Sony Classical Records day-and-date with the film on November 9, 2018.

== Background ==
Roque Baños who previously composed for Álvarez's Evil Dead (2013) and Don't Breathe (2016), scored The Girl in the Spider's Web. Álvarez asked not to watch the previous films in the series despite having watched The Girl in the Dragon Tattoo, but had read the source material. But after finishing the film, he then watched the rest of the film's in the series liking the protagonists' character as well as the scores' which often connected with the spirit of Lisbeth which helped him to engage with. Baños approached the film's music from scratch providing a new sound to the younger Lisbeth and did not think about continuity with the new scores.

Musically, Baños wanted a badass theme to reflect Lisbeth's character but also needed a theme to show her weakest part, a reminder of her past and wanted to get across the idea which can always that can hunt her and make her weak. Owing to his working relationship with Álvarez in the previous films, Baños experimented with the score by utilizing the glitchy sound of data transferring which was never used in a film score before. He further discussed with Álvarez to differentiate the sound from the previous films, which resulted in the use of orchestral and symphonic sounds. Initially, he and Álvarez felt more attracted to acoustic sounds over electronics, but then proceeded to start from electronic and industrial music like the previous instalments and as the composition process went on they decided to combine the orchestra and electronics; the former being the dominant thing in the score which he called "Hitchcock and the Machine".

For the villanious organization, Baños wanted to use a simple low and dark theme consisting of a movement of a minor 3rd, but he had composed a villainous theme for Lisbeth's past in the serial dodecaphonic technique where all notes from a chromatic scale forming a melody, a technique invented in the 20th century by Arnold Schoenberg, Anton Webern and Béla Bartók. This technique provided a frightening musical piece that detected Lisbeth's fear. For Lisbeth's hacking skills, Baños used a self-built library of sounds which were the glitchy sounds of data transferring such as the fax machine or the telephonic line that connects to the internet, which he considered that to be Lisbeth's language. Baños further created a specific emotional theme for her sister, which depicts their relationship and differs from Lisbeth's theme which was very "bad-ass" music, while Camilia being one of the villains led the score playing the antagonist part of her, thus the character becoming the past that Lisbeth do not want to confront. The tragic quality heard in the very beginning of the film with its main title music providing the spirit for the entire film. The score was then recorded at the newly inaugurated Vienna Synchron Stage in Austra, which was one of the first few films to be recorded there.

== Release ==
The soundtrack was released through Sony Classical Records on November 9, 2018.

== Track listing ==
No.	Title	Length
1.	"Prologue – Lisbeth's Childhood"	5:08
2.	"Main Title – The Birth of a Dragon"	1:36
3.	"Lisbeth's Lair"	1:52
4.	"You Have a Sister"	3:11
5.	"NSA Attack"	3:16
6.	"Lisbeth Tries Firefall"	1:22
7.	"Nightmare / Home Invasion"	3:08
8.	"Motorcycle Chase"	3:09
9.	"Elevators Meeting"	2:56
10.	"Balder's Apartment"	3:10
11.	"Tattoo Looking Glass"	3:35
12.	"Balder Shot"	3:34
13.	"Chasing August"	2:17
14.	"Drawbridge Encounter"	4:04
15.	"Firefall Answer"	2:23
16.	"Airport Needham Free"	5:55
17.	"Lisbeth Goes In"	2:07
18.	"Invading Family Home"	2:59
19.	"Masks Fight"	3:23
20.	"Vacuum Bag"	3:03
21.	"Remote Fire"	5:09
22.	"You Can't Blame Me"	4:33
23.	"Burning the Past"	2:06
24.	"Lisbeth's Theme" (Fede Alvarez Plays)	1:49
25.	"Camilla's Theme" (Roque Baños Plays)	1:59
26.	"Wounded Tattoo" (Bonus Track)	3:01
27.	"Lisbeth Drugged" (Bonus Track)	2:05
28.	"August & Lisbeth Plays Chess" (Bonus Track)	2:34
29.	"Family Home" (Bonus Track)	1:58
Total length:		87:22

== Reception ==
Jonathan Broxton of Movie Music UK wrote:

Looking at the bigger picture in terms of the entirety of 2018, The Girl in the Spider's Web caps off a spectacular year for Baños where he has distinguished himself writing excellent music across a variety of genres – sporting drama in The Miracle Season, comedy in Yucatán, fantasy drama in The Man Who Killed Don Quixote, and another action thriller in The Commuter, which was his first score of the year. With this array of music, I have been strongly reminded why I fell in love with Roque Baños's scores in the first place, and why I'm so happy that the outstanding talent he showed back home in Spain is finally being used to its fullest potential by Hollywood.

Joe Morgenstern of The Wall Street Journal wrote: "The score, by Roque Baños, is the musical equivalent of assault and battery." Kurt Loder of Reason wrote: "Also familiar is the insistently thrillery score by Roque Baños, which in no way recalls the lustrous work of Trent Reznor and Atticus Ross in the Fincher film." Philip Kemp of GamesRadar+ wrote: "The sole annoying factor is Roque Baños's relentless score, thundering away almost non-stop at full volume to remind us that this is tense, dangerous stuff. Cheers, Roque, but we had already sussed that."

Jack Pooley of WhatCulture wrote: "Baños ditches their electronic-infused stylings and tends towards a more classically operatic style which, while perhaps a bit jarring at first, is entertainingly bombastic for the majority. From the smaller, quieter moments to the big, absurd ones, Baños' score remains an easy stylistic highlight, if like most other good things in the film, it was clearly deserving of a stronger accompanying movie." Paul Klein of No Majesty wrote: "Roque Banos' score will leave you wishing it was used in a more haunting film".

== Personnel ==
Credits adapted from liner notes:

- Music composer, producer and conductor – Roque Baños
- Additional music – Vanessa Garde
- Orchestrators – Ginés Carrión, Roque Baños
- Concertmaster – Maria Dimitrova
- Contractor – Marton Barka
- Bass flute – Alejandro Villar
- Synth programming – Ben Cherney, Juan Carlos Enriquez
- Viola – Alvaro Gallego
- Recording – Bernd Mazagg
- Mixing – Stephen Lipson
- Technical manager – Roland Tscherne
- Technical assistance – Josefine Riedel
- Music consultant – Elisa Rice, Iran Garcia
- Pro-tools operator – Martin Pauser, Martin Weismayr, Tristan Linton
- Booklet editor and design – WLP Ltd.
