= The Wholly Family =

- Directed by: Terry Gilliam
- Written by: Terry Gilliam
- Produced by: Gabriele Oricchio; Amy Gilliam
- Starring: Cristiana Capotondi; Douglas Dean; Nicolas Connolly; Sergio Solli
- Cinematography: Nicola Pecorini
- Edited by: Mick Audsley
- Music by: Daniele Sepe
- Production companies: Blue Door Soc. Coop; Pastificio Garofalo
- Distributed by: Distrify
- Release dates: March 2011 (Bradford International Film Festival); 25 May 2011 (Distrify)
- Running time: 20 minutes
- Country: Italy
- Languages: English; Italian

The Wholly Family is a 2011 Italian short fantasy film written and directed by Terry Gilliam. The film was funded by the Garofalo Pasta Company and shot in the Naples area.

== Plot ==
Jake, a ten-year-old boy, is on holiday with his bickering parents in Naples. Jake asks them to buy him a Pulcinella figure from a street stall, but they refuse. Jake's father tells him a piece of local Naples lore: buying a figure for oneself will bring bad luck – good luck can be found only by stealing one. While his parents continue to argue over trivial affairs, Jake sneaks away and attempts to steal the figure. The stall holder catches Jake in the act, and directs him instead towards a series of glass bell jars containing models of the idealised Holy Family. Before Jake can make a purchase, his mother arrives, furious at her son's disappearance. After another argument with Jake's father, the family leave to return to their hotel. The stall holder, noticing that Jake has stolen one of the figures, smiles.

Jake's parents send him to bed without dinner as punishment for sneaking away. While they argue next door, Jake produces the Pulcinella figure and places it on his bedside table. Later, a hungry Jake lies in bed, and remarks that the figure has failed to bring him good luck. Suddenly the miniature Pulcinella comes to life and hides behind Jake's lamp. A full-sized Pulcinella appears on Jake's bed and offers him a plate of spaghetti. Jake backs away and bumps into a fat Pulcinella, who shoves Jake head-first into his own stomach and sits down on the bed to enjoy some spaghetti.

Jake finds himself wandering through a dark cavern with high walls. When he discovers a dinner table, an entire troupe of Pulcinella arrive. They offer him several meals, but remove them as soon as he attempts to take a bite, telling him to save his appetite for the main course. The Pulcinella then serve Jake his parents' heads on platters. Jake is disgusted and refuses to eat. The Pulcinella ask Jake if this is not what he wanted, and wonder aloud if they have misunderstood him. Deciding to give Jake a "history lesson", the Pulcinella seize him and carry him through a misty doorway and across a bridge over a body of water. The Pulcinella force Jake to look through the glass door of a building, where he sees his parents dancing happily in their wedding attire. Jake calls out but they do not hear him. The Pulcinella begin to dance in a tight circle, squashing Jake, who suddenly finds himself lying in a bed. Jake discovers that he is in a surreal maternity ward, staffed by Pulcinella, where women lay gigantic eggs which hatch into babies. At the end of the ward, Jake finds his own parents playing with a newborn dressed in Pulcinella garb. Again Jake attempts to call out to them, but a Pulcinella stops him. Jake's parents begin to bicker over how to handle the baby. Jake's mother removes the baby's mask, revealing Jake's face. As the argument escalates, she throws the baby to the floor and begins to cry, turning to her husband for comfort. The dismayed Pulcinella stoops to retrieve the baby Jake, now revealed as a broken robotic doll. The Pulcinella takes the Jake doll to a dollmaker who, despite their pleas, refuses to fix him. The Pulcinella regretfully dumps the broken doll in a burn barrel.

As Jake desperately promises to be good from now on, he awakens in his bed at the hotel and concludes that his adventures were just a dream. Finding his parents sleeping peacefully in the next room, Jake orders breakfast and serves it to them in bed. Having dressing himself as a Pulcinella, Jake tries (and fails) to balance an egg on his nose for their amusement. As the family laugh together, it is revealed that they are models inside a bell jar on the street stall seen earlier. The stallholder, describing the bell jar and its contents as a "masterpiece", asks another young boy and his parents how much they would be willing to pay for it.

== Cast ==
- Cristiana Capotondi as Mother
- Douglas Dean as Father
- Nicolas Connolly as Jake
- Sergio Solli as Stall Holder
- Renato De Maria as Little Pulcinella
- Giuseppe Gavazzi as Pulcinella On Bed
- Massimo De Luca as Fat Pulcinella & Maitre D'
- Antonino Iuorio as Pulcinella 1
- Pietro Botte as Pulcinella 2
- Fanny La Monica as Pulcinella 3
- Guido Primicile Carafa as Pulcinella 4
- Oscarino Di Maio as Pulcinella 5
- Rosalba Di Girolamo as Pulcinella 6
- Franco Gargia as Pulcinella 7
- Salvator Spagnuolo as Pulcinella 8
- Nico Cirasola as Doll Repairman
- Tiziana Grassi as Live Doll
- Nunzio Rotta as Short Barbone
- Mario Salemme as Tall Barbone
- Gabriele Oricchio as Father 2
- Annalisa Falanga as Mother 2
- Rosario Muscerino as Son 2
- Lino di Nuzzo as Father Double
- Lorenzo Avagliano as Jake Double

== Production ==
The film was funded entirely by the Garofalo Pasta Company. Gilliam defended this arrangement, stating "It wasn't selling out. The only stipulations were the film had to be made in Naples and nobody gets killed in it. I did exactly what I wanted to do." He also commented on the ease with which the film was financed: "Making a short is a lot easier than doing feature-length movies, where most of your time is spent raising the money. This took no time to raise the money. All the time was spent making the movie." The Wholly Family was one of five short films financed by Garofalo.

== Release ==
The film's premiere took place in March 2011, at the Bradford International Film Festival, where it was shown as part of a retrospective of Gilliam's life, along with Storytime and Miracle of Flight. Another film festival rejected The Wholly Family, deeming it to be an advertisement – a decision Gilliam considered "crazy". The film was later distributed online directly via Distrify.

The pasta company that funded the film also posted it to YouTube.
