= Miracle Flight =

Miracle Flight may refer to:

- "Miracle Flight", the Australian title of the episode "Gimli Glider" from the Mayday TV series
- Miracle Flight (ミラクル☆フライト), a track from Nana Mizuki's Alive & Kicking
- A form of queue-jumping or cutting in line at airports

== See also ==
- Miracle of Flight, a 1974 British animated short film
- Miracle of Flight (1935 film), a German drama film
