= Terry Gilliam's unrealized projects =

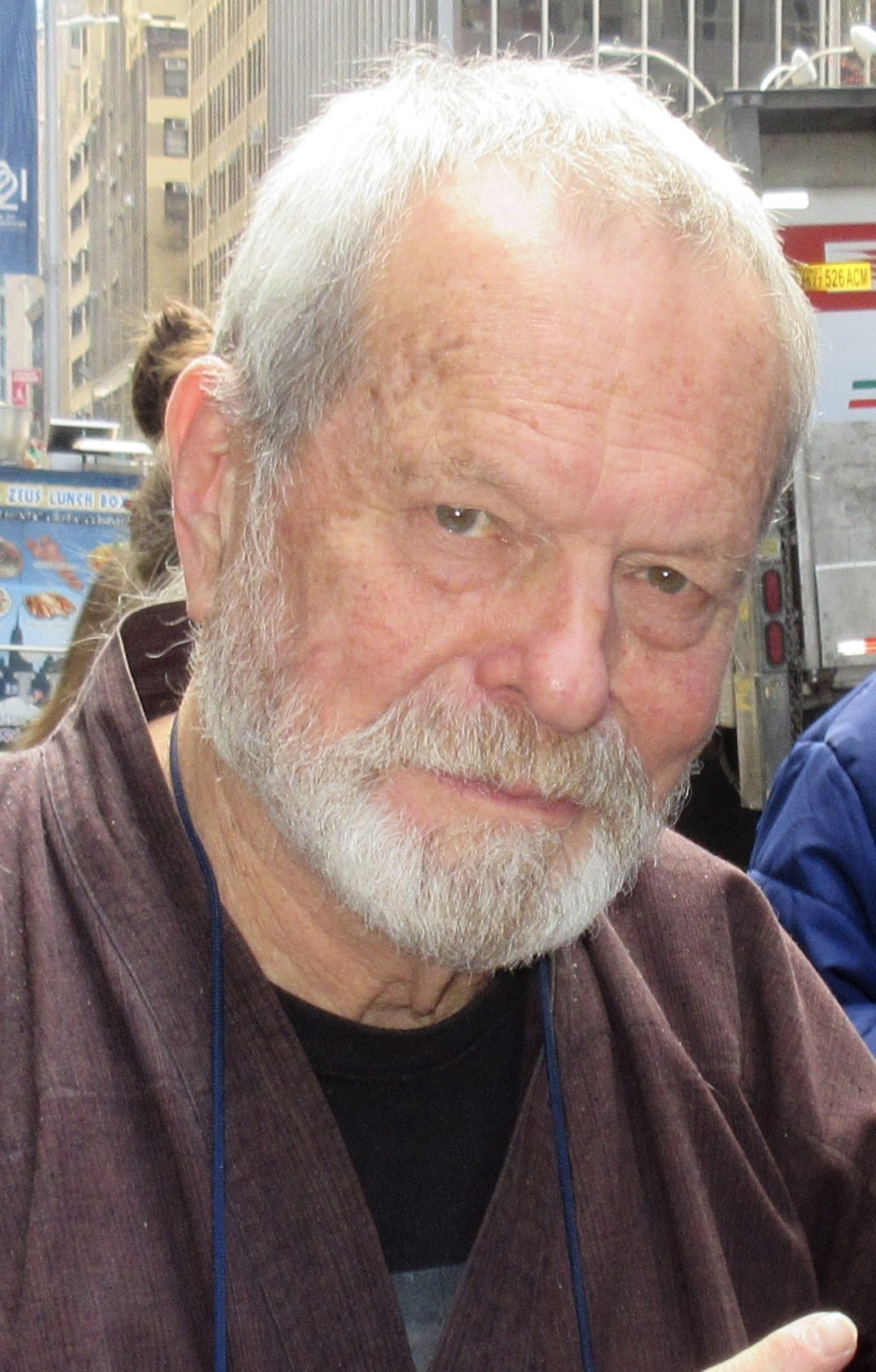
Gilliam in 2019

Over the course of his extensive career, American-born British film director Terry Gilliam has been involved in numerous projects that failed to advance beyond the pre-production phase under his direction. Several of these ventures became stalled in development hell or were cancelled. The following is a list of projects in roughly chronological order.

== 20th century ==
=== Theseus and the Minotaur ===
Right after he finished Jabberwocky (1977), Gilliam's next film project would be Theseus and the Minotaur, based on Greek mythology. The film was shelved when Gilliam chose to make Time Bandits (1981) instead, though he later pursued it again following the release of 12 Monkeys (1995). In 1997, when he returned to the project, he enlisted the help of screenwriter Tony Grisoni whose script The Lives of the Saints had impressed him a few years earlier.

=== Gormenghast ===
After directing The Life of Brian, Gilliam considered making a film adaption of Mervyn Peakes' fantasy novel Gormenghast. The owner of the rights wanted Peter Sellers to play the character Doctor Prunesquallor. Gilliam ultimately decided to not make the film because he had spent too much time thinking about it, did not have enough money to make it, and had already reused some of his ideas for it in his film Jabberwocky.

=== Monty Python's World War III ===
Before the Pythons came up with the idea for Monty Python's The Meaning of Life, they had begun writing a new movie called Monty Python's World War III.

=== Fungus the Bogeyman ===
Terry Gilliam was at one point interested in making a film adaption of the children's picture book Fungus the Bogeyman, before a television adaption was released by BBC in 2004.

=== Watchmen ===
In 1989, Gilliam and film producer Joel Silver unsuccessfully attempted to make a film adaptation of Alan Moore's Watchmen. Gilliam was, reportedly, Moore's first choice to direct the film. Gilliam tried to make the film again in 1996 but was unsuccessful.

=== A Scanner Darkly ===
In the early 1990s, Gilliam attempted to make a film adaptation of Philip K. Dick’s A Scanner Darkly.

=== Into the Woods ===
In the 1990s, Gilliam met with Stephen Sondheim for a film adaptation of the latter's musical Into the Woods that Paramount Pictures was supposed to produce, with Robin Williams and Emma Thompson as the Baker and Baker's Wife, but Gilliam refused to do it because he thought the script was less good than the original. In 2022, Gilliam would return to the property to direct a revival of the broadway show.

=== The Defective Detective ===
In April 1992, it was reported that Gilliam was going to make The Defective Detective next after The Fisher King (1991), only to abandon it in favor of making a Don Quixote film. Then, Gilliam worked on the film again, only to reject it in favor of directing 12 Monkeys (1995) instead. Then, the Los Angeles Times reported in 1996 that Gilliam was working on the script with Richard LaGravenese. According to the L.A. Times, the story was "about a middle-aged New York cop who's having a nervous breakdown and ends up in a fantasy world." The film was to have been produced by Scott Rudin and Margie Simkin and distributed by Paramount Pictures. Nicolas Cage was to star in the film. In addition to Cage, Bruce Willis, Cameron Diaz, and Nick Nolte were attached to the project. Danny DeVito was also attached to the project. Gilliam claims that Sean Connery was also involved. In February 1997, Paramount put the film in turnaround. In June 2015, Gilliam hinted that The Defective Detective could possibly be made into a miniseries on Amazon Prime Video. Variety reported in November that same year that Gilliam and LaGravenese regained the rights to the script from Paramount and "reworked it as a six-hour miniseries." In 2025, Gilliam showed optimism of the script being revived in the wake of new management changes at Paramount. Later that year, in October, he was said to be pushing for Paramount to greenlight The Defective Detective. "I'd like to direct it before I die. [...] it should be my last film," Gilliam said.

=== Cartooned ===
In October 1992, it was reported in Variety that Gilliam was signed to direct a film called Cartooned for producer Laura Ziskin. The big-budget project was in "fast-track development" at TriStar Pictures.

=== A Connecticut Yankee in King Arthur's Court ===
It was reported in 1993 that Gilliam was going to direct a film adaptation of Mark Twain's A Connecticut Yankee in King Arthur's Court for Warner Bros. and producer Jerry Weintraub, with the script written by Robert Mark Kamen. The film got cancelled when financing fell through.

=== A Tale of Two Cities ===
In 1994, Gilliam attempted to make a film adaptation of Charles Dickens A Tale of Two Cities with Mel Gibson starring. However, Gibson dropped out of the project in favor of directing and starring in Braveheart (1995). After Gibson left the project, Gilliam replaced him with Liam Neeson and attempted to make the film for half the initial budget, but to no avail. Madeleine Stowe was also attached to the project. The film was ultimately shelved due to budget and casting reasons. Gilliam then made 12 Monkeys (1995) instead. When asked in 2009 if he still expressed interest in making the film, Gilliam replied, "Nah. That's dead. That's over." However, in 2014 he stated, "Tale of Two Cities, I think, is dead... unless Johnny Depp wants to do it. He's always been a possibility for that."

=== Loony Tunes ===
Also in 1994, Gilliam was involved as director of a script called Loony Tunes, which revolved around a normal guy who continually morphs into a cartoon character. Gilliam worked for months on the idea, "but it went nowhere." A similarly plotted film, The Mask (1994), was made instead.

=== The Crowded Room ===
In 1995, Gilliam was linked to The Crowded Room, a starring vehicle for Brad Pitt that had been touted as a possible reunion for the two following their work on 12 Monkeys. However, neither party stayed with the project and both would move on to other ventures.

=== The Hunchback of Notre Dame ===
Also in 1995, Gilliam was planning a new version of The Hunchback of Notre-Dame, from a script by Rupert Walters. Gérard Depardieu was to star, but Gilliam left the project by February 1996 upon seeing the trailer for the Disney animated version. "I'd been seeing scripts for years and this one was the first one which had them all dying at the end which is the only ending you can have," said Gilliam. "It was really good. Then I saw the animated one and it has all the shots I wanted to do."

=== Time Bandits II ===
In 1996, Gilliam and Charles McKeown wrote two drafts of an unproduced script titled Time Bandits II, which would have been the sequel to Time Bandits (1981). Gilliam was to have produced the sequel and not direct it. In 2001, Gilliam and McKeown attempted to make Time Bandits II as a television miniseries for the Hallmark Channel.

=== Harry Potter and the Philosopher's Stone ===
Gilliam was reportedly J.K. Rowling's first choice to direct Harry Potter and the Philosopher's Stone (2001), the first film of the Harry Potter movies. In a 2013 interview with Entertainment Weekly, Gilliam stated, "J.K. Rowling and the producer wanted me. Then wiser people — studio heads — prevailed. I was the clear choice. At one point they approached Alan Parker and he said, 'Why are you talking to me? Gilliam is the guy who should be doing this!' But I knew I was never going to get the job." Gilliam was ultimately rejected by Warner Bros. Instead, the studio replaced Gilliam with Chris Columbus. Gilliam reportedly criticized the studio's decision to pick Columbus over him and stated, "I was the perfect guy to do Harry Potter. I remember leaving the meeting, getting in my car, and driving for about two hours along Mulholland Drive just so angry. I mean, Chris Columbus' versions are terrible. Just dull. Pedestrian." In 2011, Gilliam expressed his regret at ever entering into talks to direct the first Harry Potter film.

=== Good Omens ===
In December 1999, Gilliam announced a film of Terry Pratchett and Neil Gaiman's Good Omens that both he and Tony Grisoni were to adapt. Almost immediately, the work halted due to problems sourcing a firm deal on the prospective film only to be restarted in August when a deal with Renaissance Films for the script development was sealed. However, any subsequent plans faltered in the wake of the September 11 attacks, when Johnny Depp and Robin Williams were to have appeared as the demon Crowley and the angel Aziraphale, respectively. Gaiman wrote in his blog in 2002 that the film simply needed a studio to financially commit to making it, but no one had done so yet. In a 2005 interview, Gilliam named Good Omens as the unrealized project he worked on the most: "We managed to raise $45 million around the world, got Robin Williams and Johnny Depp to come onboard the project and just needed another $15 million from the U.S., and we couldn't get it. With those two stars and most of the budget secure, we simply couldn't get it. That's how crazy it is in this business! Now that Pirates of the Caribbean has happened and moved Johnny up a few notches as a star, Good Omens might therefore still be possible. We have made all the preparations: designs, found locations... it's ready to go into production." The following year, he stressed the dependency on "A-list actors" in order for the project to be able to move forward, saying "we are much more dependent on other people, whereas if we were working with a smaller budget it's usually easier. Yet Stephen Evans, the producer of Good Omens, says it's sometimes easier to raise 80 million dollars than it is raising 8 million dollars." Two years later, Gilliam would express optimism to Empire about the film getting a second chance due to the then-recent successes of Gaiman's Stardust and Beowulf (both 2007). In 2014, when asked by The Playlist if the resurgence of The Man Who Killed Don Quixote (2018) might allow other completed screenplays to surface, he singled out Good Omens, saying how he was considering executing their material for it as a six-part TV series instead of a film. Ironically, the story was eventually adapted in 2019 as a six-episode series, but without using Gilliam and Grisoni's script. It starring Michael Sheen and David Tennant in the main roles.

== 21st century ==
=== The Master and Margarita ===
In his introduction to Black Snow by Mikhail Bulgakov, Gilliam revealed that he was—on several occasions—in contention to direct a film version of Bulgakov's The Master and Margarita. However, he cited his reluctance to adapt the author's material as the reason why he evaded the various attempts throughout the 2000s.

=== Geek Love ===
Recurring star-collaborator Johnny Depp supposedly wanted to play Arturo the Aqua Boy—an eccentric character from Katherine Dunn's novel Geek Love—so much that he urged Gilliam to direct a film version. However, Tim Burton would end up buying the rights. The book was resonant enough for Gilliam that, by 2010, he was still trying to adapt it, albeit in the form of a West End stage play. When asked in a 2020 interview if he was still interested in making a film of Geek Love, Gilliam answered that he would love to, and said how it would be easier to visualize the work with new technology, but was skeptical about finding financiers. He also remained open to the possibility of it being produced as a streaming series rather than a feature.

=== Scaramouche ===
In 2002, The Hollywood Reporter announced that Gilliam had entered talks to direct a new version of Scaramouche, the classic swashbuckling adventure novel by Rafael Sabatini. A month later, Hotdog magazine reported that Scaramouche "looks set to take Gilliam's unique directorial eye back a couple of centuries with Johnny Depp's clown-disguised hero clashing swords with a moustache-twirlingly villainous Jeff Bridges."

=== Dan Leno and the Limehouse Golem ===
In 2003, it was reported that Gilliam and co-writer Tony Grisoni were poised to sign a deal to adapt Dan Leno and the Limehouse Golem by Peter Ackroyd. The project was developed with financing from the UK Film Council. By 2006, Gilliam said Dan Leno was "pretty dead" but added that, at the time it was developed, he was in a depressed state and the idea of a directing a film about a serial killer had seemed exciting to him. The novel was later adapted into a 2016 film by Jane Goldman.

=== Lemony Snicket's A Series of Unfortunate Events ===
In 2004, author Daniel Handler revealed in an interview that Gilliam had been interested in directing the film adaptation of his A Series of Unfortunate Events novel series.

=== The Man Who Robbed the Pierre ===
In 2005, during the Lund International Fantastic Film Festival in Sweden, Gilliam named a script he had been offered that fell by the wayside; based on Ira Berkow's The Man Who Robbed the Pierre, the true story of the infamous 1972 Pierre Hotel robbery, with John Cusack and Dustin Hoffman as the attached stars. Cusack further pursued the project, with director Steve Pink.

=== Anything for Billy ===
In February 2006, it was reported that Gilliam would co-write, with acclaimed western novelist Larry McMurtry, a new feature inspired by wild west anti-hero Billy the Kid based on McMurtry's Anything for Billy. In summer that year, Gilliam updating that: "There were a group of Italians who were offering some finance. I don't know what's going on [now]".

=== Journey to the West ===
It was rumored that Gilliam may direct or be involved in the production of the animated Gorillaz movie. In a September 2006 interview with Uncut, Damon Albarn was reported to have said, "we're making a film. We've got Terry Gilliam involved." However, in a more recent interview with Gorillaz-Unofficial, Jamie Hewlett, the co-creator of the band, stated that since the time of the previous interview, Damon's and his own interest in the film had lessened. In an August 2008 Observer interview, Gorillaz band members Albarn and Hewlett revealed the nature and title of the project, Journey to the West, a film adaptation of the opera of the same name, based on a 16th-century Chinese adventure story also known as Monkey. In January 2008, while on set of The Imaginarium of Doctor Parnassus, Gilliam stated that he was looking forward to the project, but "still waiting to see a script!"

=== The Sandman ===
In 2007, Neil Gaiman expressed interest in having Gilliam direct a film adaptation of The Sandman, but the director was too preoccupied with Good Omens at the moment.

=== The World Jones Made ===
In 2009, it was announced that Gilliam was going to adapt Philip K. Dick's The World Jones Made into a feature film.

=== Mr. Vertigo ===
During the second half of 2011, Gilliam and Paul Auster wrote a screenplay for a film adaptation of Auster's novel Mr. Vertigo. In June 2018, Gilliam announced at the Brussels International Film Festival that he was working again on Mr. Vertigo, that it might be his next film, and that he had Ralph Fiennes attached to star in it.

=== Untitled stop-motion film ===
In 2014, Gilliam was in talks to make his first animated feature film with Laika, the studio behind Coraline and ParaNorman.

=== The Vorrh TV series ===
In 2018, author Brian Catling revealed to The Guardian that his popular trilogy of novels, The Vorrh, was in the process of being developed to film by Gilliam. "The problem is, film producers want you to sum it up in one page," Catling commented. "They haven't got patience to read the thing. They say, 'What is it? What does it do?' Those questions are a blank wall to me." In 2021, there was speculation that Gilliam was adapting The Vorrh as a four-part series for television. The following year, when asked if his fans would have to wait much longer for another Gilliam film, the director responded: "I'm not inclined to compromise, I'm looking for producers for the latest script. There's always the idea of a series based on the book The Vorrh by Brian Catling, one of the most beautiful books I've ever read."

=== Lunatic at Large ===
In 2020, Gilliam was attached to direct a film based on an unproduced Stanley Kubrick project titled Lunatic at Large. A September shoot was scheduled, but these plans were scrapped as result of the COVID-19 pandemic. "There was a script and I had a cast, but the lockdown has ruined everything," Gilliam said. The film would have starred Benicio Del Toro, Matthias Schoenaerts and Lily-Rose Depp.

=== Carnival: At the End of Days ===
As early as 2021, Gilliam revealed that he was working on a new script for a film in which "God finally decides to destroy humanity - for desecrating the beautiful garden he created." In 2022, he stated that he conceived the overall idea while in self-isolation in Italy, during the COVID-19 pandemic. In an interview Gilliam gave to BBC Radio in February 2023, it was confirmed that he had enlisted the duties of Christopher Brett Bailey in helping him to co-write the project. In April that year, reports emerged that the film would be titled The Carnival at the End of Days and would feature the Four Horsemen of the Apocalypse. In 2024, Gilliam announced to Première that production was expected to begin in January 2025. The film was to star Johnny Depp as Satan and Jeff Bridges as God, along with Adam Driver and Jason Momoa. In July 2024, during the Umbria Film Festival in Montone, Gilliam confirmed that Asa Butterfield was cast as Adam. However, by late September, Gilliam stated to Czech media that he did not have enough money that was required to make the film. In February the following year, Italian producer and entrepreneur Andrea Iervolino boarded the project, retitled Carnival: At the End of Days, helping to raise financing at the European Film Market in Berlin for a proposed shoot that April. In July, Gilliam revealed the project was back in development limbo.

== Offers ==
=== 13 Ways to Kill a Poet segment ===
According to Martin Scorsese, in the early 1980s he reached out to Gilliam with the proposition of directing a segment of an omnibus film he was planning with Michael Powell called 13 Ways to Kill a Poet. It was to be composed of thirteen shorts films each centered on a different poet, with directors Francis Ford Coppola, Wim Wenders and David Bowie attached, among others.

=== Enemy Mine ===
Gilliam turned down an offer to direct Enemy Mine (1985).

=== Who Framed Roger Rabbit ===
Gilliam also turned down an offer to direct Who Framed Roger Rabbit (1988). According to Gilliam, "I passed on that one, but that didn't matter because it was just at a stage when it was still just the book and I didn't want to get into animation. I just read the book and said, 'This is too much work.' Pure laziness on my part." The film wound up being directed by Robert Zemeckis.

=== The Addams Family ===
According to Barry Sonnenfeld, Gilliam turned down the offer to direct The Addams Family (1991).

=== Alien sequel ===
Gilliam confirmed in 2018 that he turned down an offer to direct one of the sequels to Alien (1979). It is presumed he turned down Alien 3 (1992), even though Gilliam did not specify which of the sequels he was referring to.

=== Bayswater ===
On June 10, 1993, while working on The Defective Detective, Gilliam recorded a diary of his day for the British Film Institute: "[After lunch] I turn my attention to a script called Bayswater that has been sent to me with the hope that I might direct it in the autumn. Although it's nicely written, it doesn't manage to excite me, so I call the producer, Brian Eastman, and talk myself out of another chance to make a film."

=== Forrest Gump ===
Gilliam turned down the offer to direct Forrest Gump (1994).

=== Braveheart ===
Gilliam turned down the offer to direct Braveheart (1995).

=== Son of Strangelove ===
In 1995, Stanley Kubrick hired Terry Southern to write the script that would have been the sequel to Kubrick's 1964 film Dr. Strangelove. The film was to have been titled Son of Strangelove, and Kubrick wanted Gilliam to direct it. The script was never completed. Gilliam said in 2013, "I was told after Kubrick died—by someone who had been dealing with him—that he had been interested in trying to do another Strangelove with me directing. I never knew about that until after he died but I would have loved to."

=== The Truman Show ===
Gilliam was among the filmmakers considered to direct The Truman Show (1998) before Peter Weir assumed the position.

=== Troy ===
Gilliam turned down the offer to direct Troy (2004), as he "did not understand how you can make a film based on the poem the Iliad without the participation of the Greek gods".

=== Harry Potter and the Half-Blood Prince ===
Gilliam turned down the offer to direct Harry Potter and the Half-Blood Prince (2009), the sixth film of the series. When asked if he was interested in directing any of the Harry Potter movies, Gilliam replied, "Warner Bros. had their chance the first time around, and they blew it. It's a factory job, that's what it is, and I know the way it's done. I've had too many friends work on those movies. I know the way it works, and that's not the way I work."

== See also ==
- Terry Gilliam filmography
