= Aaron Bergeron =

American comedy writer

Aaron Bergeron is an American television writer and producer.

== Career ==
He was a writer for The Daily Show with Jon Stewart and D.L. Hughley Breaks the News, a producer for My Next Guest Needs No Introduction with David Letterman, and screenwriter for Terry Gilliam's The Legend of Hallowdega. He was also a special consultant for Jurassic World Dominion.

He has twice been nominated for an Emmy, in 2002 as a writer for The Daily Show and in 2018 as series producer for My Next Guest Needs No Introduction.
