= The Man Who Killed Don Quixote (soundtrack) =

2018 film soundtrack album

Film score by Roque Baños
- Released: 11 June 2018
- Genre: Film score
- Length: 64:23
- Label: Melliam Music

Roque Baños chronology
The Miracle Season (2018)	The Man Who Killed Don Quixote (2018)	The Girl in the Spider's Web (2018)

The Man Who Killed Don Quixote (Original Motion Picture Soundtrack) is the soundtrack accompanying the 2018 film of the same name directed by Terry Gilliam. The film's musical score is composed by Roque Baños who scored the film during his involvement in the post-production. Melliam Music released the album on 11 June 2018, ten days after the film's theatrical release in Spain.

== Background ==
Roque Baños was involved in the post-production of the film, where he saw the climax scene and recalled him that Gilliam wanted a blend of orchestra and choir music in the moment to signify the stature of the titular character. He felt that "Doing that recording and looking at the picture was heaven for me". Eventually, Gilliam also praised his contribution to the film as it elevated its status to another level.

== Reception ==
Rafael Motamayor of IGN wrote "Roque Baños' score, which combines a traditional orchestra with Spanish guitars and sounds, making you feel transported to the era of chivalry." David Morgan of CBS News called the score as "top-notch". David Rooney of The Hollywood Reporter and Peter Debruge of Variety described the score as "epic" and "grand". Shaun Munro of Flickering Myth wrote that Baños' music lends "a classically melodramatic sweep to the dusty vistas".

== Track listing ==
The Man Who Killed Don Quixote (Original Motion Picture Soundtrack) track listing
No.	Title	Length
1.	"I Am Don Quixote"	2:59
2.	"The Shoe Maker"	2:47
3.	"The Boss's Wife"	2:04
4.	"Return to Los Sueños"	3:22
5.	"Quixote Vive!"	4:35
6.	"Release the Prisioners"	3:28
7.	"A Marvellous Day for Adventures"	3:08
8.	"Spanish Gold"	2:35
9.	"The Lost Kingdom of the Moors"	3:36
10.	"The Knight of the Mirrors"	4:10
11.	"Who Wrote This Ending!"	4:33
12.	"Angelica's Love"	3:49
13.	"Waltz at the Castle"	2:55
14.	"The Ride to the Moon"	3:34
15.	"A Slap Dance and Kiss"	3:08
16.	"Escaping from the Castle"	3:56
17.	"The Ritual"	2:12
18.	"He Will Never Die (nor Will Giants)"	5:23
19.	"A New Beginning"	2:09
Total length:		64:23
