= Nicola Pecorini =

Italian cinematographer (born 1957)

- Born: 10 August 1957 (age 68); Milan, Lombardy, Italy
- Years active: 1983–present
- Spouse: Caroline Goodall (m. 1994)
- Children: 2

Nicola Pecorini (born 10 August 1957) is an Italian cinematographer.

== Life and career ==
Pecorini was born in Milan, Lombardy, Italy. He founded, with Garrett Brown, inventor of the steadicam, the Steadicam Operators Association, Inc. (SOA), in 1988.

Pecorini moved to the United States in 1993, and since 1997, he has frequently collaborated with director Terry Gilliam (together they have made Fear and Loathing in Las Vegas, The Brothers Grimm, Tideland, The Imaginarium of Doctor Parnassus, The Zero Theorem and The Man Who Killed Don Quixote).

In 2000, he won Best Cinematography at the San Sebastian International Film Festival for Harrison's Flowers.

He is married to British-Australian actress Caroline Goodall and has two children, Gemma and Leone. He is blind in one eye.

== Filmography ==
Film

Year	Title	Director	Notes
1997	Rhinoceros Hunting in Budapest	Michael Haussman	
1998	Fear and Loathing in Las Vegas	Terry Gilliam	
2000	Rules of Engagement	William Friedkin	With William A. Fraker
2000	Harrison's Flowers	Élie Chouraqui	
2003	The Order	Brian Helgeland	
2005	Tideland	Terry Gilliam	
2008	Your Whole Life Ahead of You	Paolo Virzì	
2009	The Imaginarium of Doctor Parnassus	Terry Gilliam	
2010	The First Beautiful Thing	Paolo Virzì	
2011	Ra.One	Anubhav Sinha	With V. Manikandan and Ewan Mulligan
2013	The Zero Theorem	Terry Gilliam	
2014	Misunderstood	Asia Argento	
2018	The Man Who Killed Don Quixote	Terry Gilliam	
2018	The Legend of the Christmas Witch	Michele Soavi	
2020	Agony	Michele Civetta	
2024	Modì, Three Days on the Wing of Madness	Johnny Depp	With Dariusz Wolski

Short film

Year	Title	Director	Notes
2001	Ode an die Freude	Ralf Schmerberg	Segment of Poem
2002	Secret Tournament	Terry Gilliam	
2006	Postmortem Bliss	Floria Sigismondi	
2010	Problema	Ralf Schmerberg	
2011	The Wholly Family	Terry Gilliam	
TBA	Hallucinaut	Daniel Auber	

Television

Year	Title	Director	Notes
1996	Tracey Takes On...	Simon Curtis	Episodes "Death" and "Law"; Also directed episode "Health"
2013	Doubt	Thomas Schlamme	TV movie
2019	Kingdoms of Fire	Peter Webber; Alejandro Toledo	14 episodes

Music videos

- "Oh Sailor", Fiona Apple (2005)
- "Pourtant", Vanessa Paradis (2000)
- "Riding With The King", B.B. King & Eric Clapton (2000)
- "Dark Moon", Chris Isaak (1994) (director)
