= Lost in La Mancha =

2002 film by Keith Fulton and Louis Pepe

- Theatrical release poster
- Directed by: Keith Fulton; Louis Pepe
- Written by: Keith Fulton; Louis Pepe
- Produced by: Lucy Darwin
- Starring: Terry Gilliam; Johnny Depp; Jean Rochefort
- Narrated by: Jeff Bridges
- Music by: Miriam Cutler
- Distributed by: IFC Films
- Release date: 30 August 2002
- Running time: 93 minutes
- Language: English/French

Lost in La Mancha is a 2002 documentary film about Terry Gilliam's first attempt to make The Man Who Killed Don Quixote, a film adaptation of the 1605/1615 novel Don Quixote by Miguel de Cervantes. The documentary was shot in 2000 during pre-production and filming and it was intended as a "making-of" documentary for the film. However, Gilliam's failure to complete his film resulted in the documentary filmmakers retitling their work as Lost in la Mancha and releasing it independently.

Written and directed by Keith Fulton and Louis Pepe, Lost in La Mancha presents Gilliam's effort to make Don Quixote as a parallel to Quixote's quest to become a hero. It co-stars Johnny Depp, Jean Rochefort, and Vanessa Paradis, who were cast as stars for The Man Who Killed Don Quixote. It is narrated by Jeff Bridges.

Gilliam ultimately succeeded in making The Man Who Killed Don Quixote, which was released in 2018. Fulton and Pepe have made a follow-up documentary, titled He Dreams of Giants, which covers Gilliam's entire scope of work on the Quixote project.

== Background ==
Finding the source material written by Miguel de Cervantes too vast, Gilliam and his co-writer decided to create their own version of the Quixote story. They made a major change inspired by Mark Twain's 1889 novel A Connecticut Yankee in King Arthur's Court. They planned to have the character of Sancho Panza appear only early in the film. He was to be replaced by character Toby Grisoni, a 21st-century marketing executive thrown back through time, whom Don Quixote mistakes for Panza.

Gilliam was excited about the film, as he felt that the story of Don Quixote embodies many of his own themes (such as the individual versus society, the concept of sanity, etc.). He intended to film it entirely in Spain and other nations in Europe. Jean Rochefort was cast to play Don Quixote, in preparation for which he spent seven months learning English. Toby was to be played by Johnny Depp and Vanessa Paradis would have been his love interest.

Fulton and Pepe had previously filmed a making-of documentary about Giliam's earlier film 12 Monkeys.

== Production ==
Lost in La Mancha explores how the film's production issues soon overran schedule and budget. Gilliam tells his crew not to be afraid to tell him that something is too complicated or expensive to be done, because he needs to be restrained sometimes. In another interview, he says he wants his films to be seen and enjoyed by the widest audience possible. But natural forces were more important than his excesses.

On the first day of shooting, the crew discovered that their outdoor filming location, in the area known as Bardenas Reales, was plagued by nearly constant noise from a nearby NATO aircraft target practice area. Gilliam decided to continue shooting footage, knowing that he could replace the audio in post-production. But during the second day of shooting, hail and a flash flood damaged equipment. In addition, it permanently changed the appearance of the location, where some shots had not yet been completed. The entire sequence would have to be reshot.

More significantly, days later it became apparent that Rochefort was injured. Within a week Gilliam learned that Rochefort had a herniated disc and would be unable to continue filming. This ended production completely, resulting in a record $15 million insurance claim. The insurance company owned the rights to the screenplay for several years, until they were transferred back to Gilliam. He restarted production of The Man Who Killed Don Quixote in 2008.

Keith Fulton and Louis Pepe had previously made a documentary about the making of Gilliam's film 12 Monkeys titled The Hamster Factor and Other Tales of Twelve Monkeys. They were strongly supported by Gilliam throughout their filming on the Don Quixote project. Gilliam reportedly often has people documenting the making of films so that should something go wrong, he has a record of the events from his perspective.

== Reception ==
Released in 2002, Lost in La Mancha received positive reception from critics. Review aggregate Rotten Tomatoes reports that 94% of critics have given Lost in La Mancha a positive review based on 103 reviews, with an average rating of 7.60/10. It also holds a "Top Critics" score of 89%. The website's critical consensus is "A remarkable behind-the-scenes look at a movie that wasn't, Lost in La Mancha is an incisive, entertaining document of the difficulties inherent in the moviemaking process." On Metacritic, the film has a weighted average score of 74 out of 100, based on 35 critics.

Critic Leonard Maltin has described Lost in La Mancha as one of the best films about the process of filmmaking.

It was nominated for various awards, including a BAFTA Award and a Satellite Award for Best Documentary Film. It won a Satellite Award for Best Documentary DVD.

== Sequel ==
In May 2018, a few days before the premiere of The Man Who Killed Don Quixote, Fulton and Pepe said they would release a follow-up documentary, to be titled He Dreams of Giants. It would cover the entire history of the film's making, with particular focus on what happened after the events depicted in Lost in La Mancha.

Pepe said that the film would be "more introspective" than Lost in La Mancha, saying,

"This is more a film about an internal struggle in an artist’s mind. What is it like for an artist to be standing on the brink of actually finishing this project finally? [...] Even on the set we would say the conflicts raging around Terry right now of making the movie are not nearly as interesting as what’s going on inside his head."

The film premiered at DOC NYC on 10 November 2019. The filmmakers have not said whether it will be a bonus feature on The Man Who Killed Don Quixote's home media release, or will be released independently, as was Lost in La Mancha.
