= He Dreams of Giants =

2019 documentary by Keith Fulton & Louis Pepe

- Poster
- Directed by: Keith Fulton; Louis Pepe
- Written by: Keith Fulton; Louis Pepe
- Starring: Terry Gilliam; Adam Driver; Jonathan Pryce
- Distributed by: Blue Finch Film Releasing
- Release date: November 10, 2019 (Doc NYC)
- Running time: 83 minutes
- Country: United Kingdom
- Languages: English; French; Spanish

He Dreams of Giants is a 2019 British follow-up documentary film to 2002's Lost in La Mancha. The film follows director Terry Gilliam's making of The Man Who Killed Don Quixote, a long-gestating project that had suffered multiple delays and cast changes, which was finally released in 2018.

== Synopsis ==
The film, much like the first, follows Gilliam's making of The Man Who Killed Don Quixote in Spain in 2017, finally securing the finance necessary (albeit half of the 2000 version's budget) and reuniting several of the original crew, such as cinematographer Nicola Pecorini. Interspersed with the behind-the-scenes of the production is Gilliam meditating on film-making, aging and his fraught relationship with the film's long development.

== Production ==
In May 2018, a few days before the premiere of The Man Who Killed Don Quixote, Fulton and Pepe said they would release a new documentary. It would cover the entire history of the film's making, with particular focus on what happened after the events depicted in Lost in La Mancha.

Pepe said that the film would be "more introspective" than Lost in La Mancha, saying,

"This is more a film about an internal struggle in an artist’s mind. What is it like for an artist to be standing on the brink of actually finishing this project finally? [...] Even on the set we would say the conflicts raging around Terry right now of making the movie are not nearly as interesting as what’s going on inside his head."

== Reception ==
On the review aggregator website Rotten Tomatoes, 90% of 20 critics' reviews are positive, with an average rating of 6.9/10.
