= The Legend of Hallowdega =

- Directed by: Terry Gilliam
- Written by: Aaron Bergeron
- Produced by: Samantha Storr; Justin Wilkes
- Starring: David Arquette; Justin Kirk; Dale Earnhardt Jr. Darrell Waltrip; Buddy Baker; Buz McKim
- Cinematography: Luke McCoubrey
- Edited by: Alex Horwitz
- Music by: Human; Bill Sherman
- Production company: RadicalMedia
- Release date: 31 October 2010
- Running time: 18 minutes
- Country: United States
- Language: English

The Legend of Hallowdega is a 2010 black comedy fantasy mockumentary short film, directed by Terry Gilliam from a screenplay by Aaron Bergeron. The film stars David Arquette and Justin Kirk, and features appearances by Dale Earnhardt Jr. and Darrell Waltrip. The Legend of Hallowdega was produced by RadicalMedia as branded content film for AMP Energy Juice, and was shot on location in Charlotte, NC and at Talladega Superspeedway, Alabama.

== Plot ==
The host of an investigative news show joins forces with a techno-geek paranormal expert to dodge close-calls and chase crazy leads to get to the bottom of the mysteries around Talladega Superspeedway.

== Cast ==
- David Arquette as Kiyash Monsef
- Justin Kirk as Host
- Dale Earnhardt Jr. as himself
- Darrell Waltrip as himself
- Buddy Baker as himself
- Buz McKim as himself
