= The Brothers Grimm (film) =

2005 American film by Terry Gilliam

- Theatrical release poster
- Directed by: Terry Gilliam
- Written by: Ehren Kruger
- Produced by: Charles Roven; Daniel Bobker
- Starring: Matt Damon; Heath Ledger; Peter Stormare; Lena Headey; Jonathan Pryce; Monica Bellucci
- Cinematography: Newton Thomas Sigel
- Edited by: Lesley Walker
- Music by: Dario Marianelli
- Production companies: Mosaic Media Group; Daniel Bobker Productions; Metro-Goldwyn-Mayer Pictures; Atlas Entertainment
- Distributed by: Dimension Films (through Miramax Films)
- Release dates: 26 August 2005 (United States); 4 November 2005 (United Kingdom); 11 November 2005 (Czech Republic)
- Running time: 118 minutes
- Countries: United Kingdom; Czech Republic
- Languages: English; French; Deutsch; Italian
- Budget: $80–88 million
- Box office: $105.3 million

The Brothers Grimm is a 2005 fantasy adventure film directed by Terry Gilliam. The film stars Matt Damon, Heath Ledger and Lena Headey in a heavily fictional reimagining of the Brothers Grimm as traveling con artists in Napoleonic French-occupied Germany, during the early 19th century. The brothers eventually encounter a genuine fairy-tale curse which requires courage instead of their usual bogus exorcisms. Supporting characters are played by Peter Stormare, Jonathan Pryce and Monica Bellucci. The film was a British–Czech international co-production, with the film being shot in the Czech Republic.

In February 2001, Ehren Kruger sold his spec script to Metro-Goldwyn-Mayer (MGM). With Gilliam's hiring as director, the script was rewritten by Gilliam and Tony Grisoni but the Writers Guild of America refused to credit them for their work. MGM eventually dropped out as distributor but decided to co-finance The Brothers Grimm with Dimension Films and Summit Entertainment, while Dimension took over distribution duties. Gilliam often had feuds with brothers Bob and Harvey Weinstein, which caused the original theatrical release date to be delayed nearly ten months.

The Brothers Grimm was finally released on 26 August 2005 to mixed reviews and grossed $105.3 million at the worldwide box office.

== Plot ==
In 1811, Will and Jake Grimm are traveling con artists who use Jake's extensive knowledge of folklore to fool people into believing they exorcise the supernatural, along with their sidekicks Hidlick and Bunst, in French-occupied Germany. Italian torturer Mercurio Cavaldi captures them and takes them to French General Vavarin Delatombe. In exchange for amnesty, Delatombe charges the brothers with investigating the disappearances of several young girls from the village of Marbaden, on the assumption that it is the work of con artists like themselves.

At the village, the brothers enlist the help of fur trapper Angelika, whose younger sisters were the first to vanish. Angelika takes them to a tower in the nearby forest, which was built centuries prior by a vain Thuringian Queen in a failed attempt to escape the plague. That night, one of the brothers' horses, enchanted by a mysterious huntsman, abducts another girl Elsie from the village by swallowing her whole and fleeing into the forest. Angelika, the brothers, and Cavaldi give chase, but are unable to catch it. Angelika encounters a wolf which hesitates to attack her.

Cavaldi takes the brothers and Angelika back to Delatombe; but they are allowed to return to Marbaden when they convince the general that the forest's magic is actually caused by German rebels in hiding. In the forest, Jake successfully scales the tower, discovering it is encircled by twelve crypts. Inside, Jake discovers the Queen, extremely aged and decrepit but still alive, and is nearly seduced by a youthful vision of her reflected in her magic mirror. Meanwhile, in the village, a girl Sasha is attacked by a mud monster; it absorbs her before turning into a gingerbread man and disappearing into the well, despite Angelika and Cavaldi's efforts to save her. Sasha reappears in a pond near the tower; the wolf transforms into the huntsman and places her in one of the crypts. The brothers rescue Sasha and narrowly escape, taking the huntsman's magic axe. The brothers return to the village but Sasha remains unconscious. Jake concludes the abducted girls are part of a magic ritual in conjunction with an upcoming lunar eclipse meant for the Queen to regain her youth and beauty.

Delatombe suddenly arrives, having beheaded Hidlick and Bunst; he arrests the brothers, decries them as frauds, and orders the forest burned down with them in it. Angelika rescues them and recognizes the axe as her father's. The huntsman is revealed to be Angelika's father, under the Queen's spell. Angelika falls into a nearby pond and vanishes, becoming the Queen's twelfth and final sacrifice. The Queen conjures a powerful wind, extinguishing the fire and scattering the French troops. Delatombe shoots Cavaldi when he refuses to kill the brothers; but he survives, having donned their faux-magic armor. Will fights against Delatombe and eventually impales him.

In the tower, the Queen seduces Will, removing her control over the huntsman and placing it on him. Jake uses the huntsman's axe to smash the mirror. Angelika's father comes to his senses and destroys the rest of the mirror by jumping out of the window with it, killing the Queen. Jake awakens Angelika with a kiss, which in turn revives the others. The children are joyfully reunited with their families and the village celebrates. Will suggests a career change to Jake. A raven flies away carrying a shard of the mirror with a piece of the Queen's reflection.

== Cast ==
- Matt Damon as Will Grimm. Will is the older, more serious brother, interested in making money and meeting women. Will is often hard on Jake and blames him for the death of their sister, but at the same time is very protective of him.
- Heath Ledger as Jake Grimm. Jake is the younger and more sensitive of the brothers and is interested in fairy tales and adventures. Jake feels that Will does not care about or believe in him.
- Peter Stormare as Mercurio Cavaldi: Delatombe's Italian associate. Cavaldi originally has a grudge against the brothers, but eventually has a change of heart.
- Lena Headey as Angelika: Her father is a woodsman transformed into a werewolf huntsman by the Queen's curse.
- Jonathan Pryce as General Vavarin Delatombe: A cruel French military commander. Delatombe attempts to burn down the forest and kill the brothers.
- Tomáš Hanák as the Huntsman
- Julian Bleach as Letorc, Delatombe's manservant
- Monica Bellucci as the Mirror Queen
- Mackenzie Crook and Richard Ridings as Hidlick and Bunst: Duo sidekicks for the Grimms. They are eventually beheaded by French soldiers.
- Roger Ashton-Griffiths as The Mayor
- Anna Rust as Sister Grimm

== Production ==
=== Development ===
Ehren Kruger's screenplay was written as a spec script; in February 2001, Metro-Goldwyn-Mayer (MGM) purchased the script, with Summit Entertainment to co-finance the film. In October 2002, Terry Gilliam entered negotiations to direct, and rewrote Kruger's script alongside frequent collaborator Tony Grisoni. The Writers Guild of America refused to credit Gilliam and Grisoni for their rewrite work, and Kruger received sole credit.

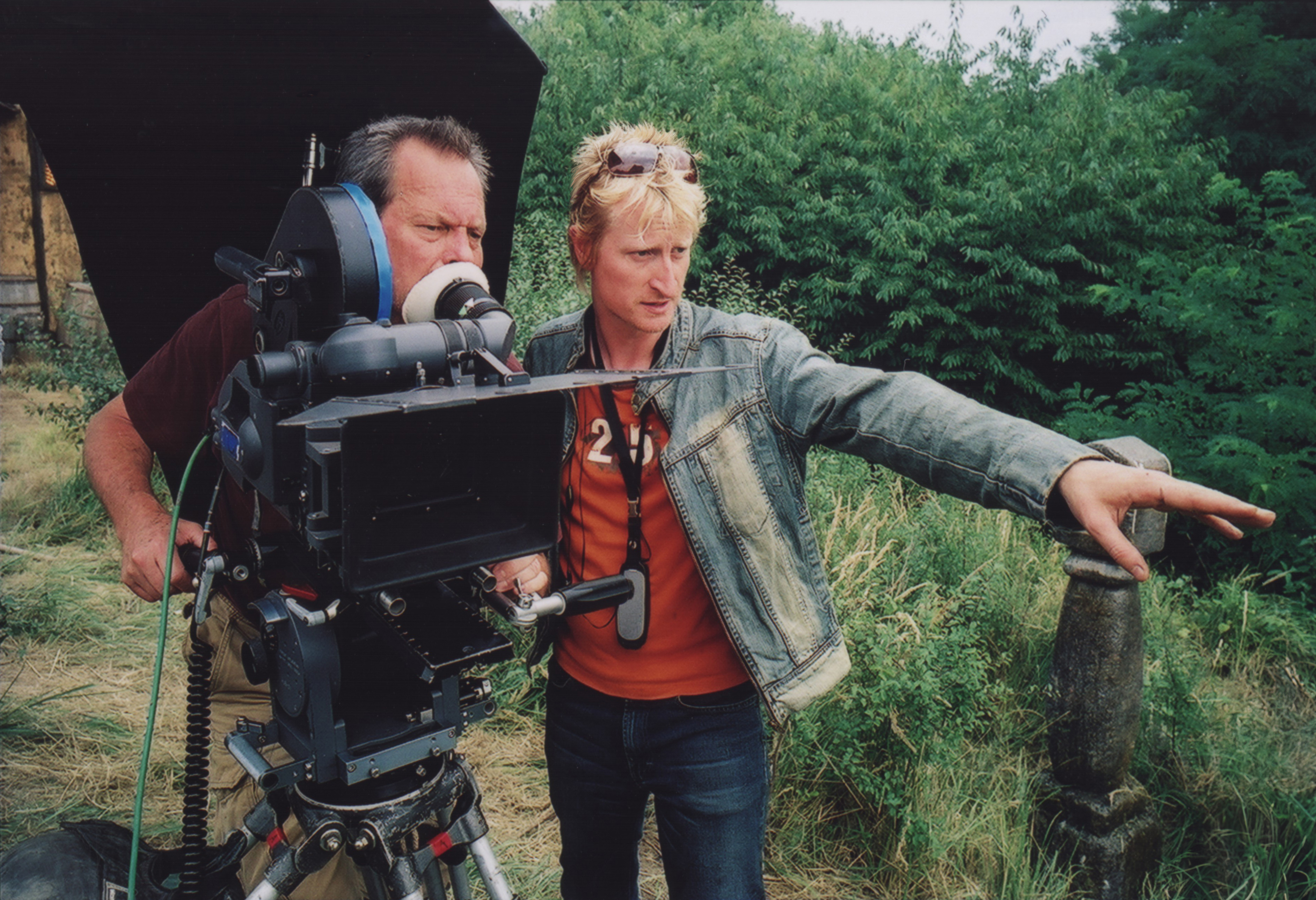
Director Terry Gilliam and production designer Guy Hendrix Dyas on set during filming in Prague, Czech Republic

After Gilliam's hiring, production was put on fast track for a target November 2004 theatrical release date. MGM had trouble financing the film, and dropped out as main distributor. Weeks later, Bob Weinstein, under his Dimension Films production company, made a deal with MGM and Summit to co-finance The Brothers Grimm, and become the lead distributor. Projected at $75 million, this was to be Dimension Films' most expensive film ever.

=== Casting ===
Johnny Depp was Gilliam's first choice for Will Grimm. Matt Damon joked that Weinstein "was kicking himself because halfway through production, Pirates of the Caribbean came out and Depp was all of a sudden a big sensation". Heath Ledger met Gilliam in November 2002 when Nicola Pecorini recommended the actor to the director, comparing him to Depp. Gilliam intended to cast Ledger opposite Depp. Damon and Ledger were originally cast in opposite roles before they asked to have their characters switched.

Damon had wanted to work with Gilliam for years. Damon "grew up loving [Gilliam's] Time Bandits, the way that movie created this weird but totally convincing world". Gilliam elected to have Damon wear a prosthetic nose, but Weinstein said "it would have distracted audiences from Damon's star-studded good looks". Gilliam later reasoned that "it would have been the most expensive nose job ever".

Gilliam wanted Samantha Morton for the female lead but was overruled by The Weinsteins who wanted a more conventionally beautiful actress. Robin Williams was originally cast in the role of Cavaldi before dropping out and was replaced by Peter Stormare. Nicole Kidman turned down the role of the Mirror Queen due to scheduling conflicts.

=== Filming ===
The original start date was April 2003, but filming did not begin until 30 June. It was decided to shoot The Brothers Grimm entirely in the Czech Republic over budget constraints. Damon said "this is an $80 million movie, which would probably cost $120–140 million in America". The majority of filming required sound stages and backlots from Barrandov Studios in Prague. Filming at Barrandov ended on 23 October. Location filming began afterwards, which included the Křivoklát Castle.

Along with Alien vs. Predator and Van Helsing, The Brothers Grimm provided work for hundreds of local jobs and contributed over $300 million into the Czech Republic's economy. Gilliam hired Guy Hendrix Dyas as production designer after he was impressed with Dyas' work on X2.

Damon cameoed in the 2004 teen comedy film EuroTrip while he was in Prague filming The Brothers Grimm, where he play the punk singer, given he could shave his head for the wig he wore in Grimm.. EuroTrip writers Alec Berg, David Mandel, and Jeff Schaffer, were Damon's old Harvard college friends.

=== Disputes between Terry Gilliam, Bob Weinstein, and Harvey Weinstein ===
Gilliam often disputed with executive producers Bob and Harvey Weinstein during production. The Weinstein Brothers fired cinematographer and regular Gilliam collaborator Nicola Pecorini after six weeks. Pecorini was then replaced by Newton Thomas Sigel.

"I'm used to riding roughshod over studio executives," Gilliam explained, "but the Weinsteins rode roughshod over me." Gilliam got so upset that filming was shut down for nearly two weeks. Matt Damon reflected on the situation: "I've never been in a situation like that. Terry was spitting rage at the system, at the Weinsteins. You can't try and impose big compromises on a visionary director like him. If you try to force him to do what you want creatively, he'll go nuclear."

The feud between Gilliam and the Weinsteins was eventually settled, although Bob Weinstein blamed the entire situation on yellow journalism. Filming was scheduled to end in October, but due to various problems during filming, principal photography did not end until the following 27 November.

Due to the tensions between Gilliam and the Weinsteins during production, Gilliam said in retrospect about the film, "[I]t's not the film they wanted and it's not quite the film I wanted. It's the film that is a result of [...] two groups of people, who aren't working well together." Regarding the Weinsteins also producing Martin Scorsese's film Gangs of New York (2002), Gilliam stated: "Marty [Scorsese] said almost the exact same quote I said, without us knowing it: 'They took the joy out of filmmaking.'"

=== Visual effects ===
Post-production was severely delayed when Gilliam disagreed with the Weinsteins over the final cut privilege. In the meantime, the conflict lasted so long that Gilliam had enough time to shoot another feature film, Tideland. To create the visual effects, Gilliam awarded the shots to Peerless Camera, the London-based effects studio he founded in the late 1970s with visual effects supervisor Kent Houston. However, two months into filming, Houston said that Peerless "ran into a number of major issues with The Brothers Grimm and with the Weinstein Brothers". He continued that "the main problem was the fact that the number of effects shots had dramatically increased, mainly because of issues that arose during shooting with the physical effects."

Meanwhile, the Queen's chamber inside the tower was actually built by the Art Department as 2 sets. One set was resplendent and new while the other was old and decrepit. The sets were joined to each other by the central mirror, a piece of transparent glass giving the illusion that a single set was reflected and used to create the effect.

There were originally to be about 500 effect shots, but it increased to 800. The post-production conflict between Gilliam and the Weinsteins also gave enough time for Peerless to work on another film, The Legend of Zorro. Four different creatures were required for computer animation: a Wolfman, a mud creature, the Mirror Queen, and a living tree. John Paul Docherty, who headed the digital visual effects unit, studied the animation of the computer-generated Morlocks in The Time Machine for the Wolfman. Docherty depicted the Morlocks "as a nice mix between human and animal behaviors".

The death of The Mirror Queen was the most complex effect of the film. In the sequence, the Queen turns into hundreds of shards of glass and shatters. With computerized rendering, this could not happen, as the 3D volume of the body suddenly turns into 2D pieces of glass. The problem was eventually solved due to sudden advances that occurred with Softimage XSI software.

== Release ==
The original theatrical release date was due in November 2004 before being changed many times; the dates had been moved to February 2005, 29 July, 23 November, and finally 26 August. Executive producer Bob Weinstein blamed the pushed-back release dates on budgetary concerns. To help promote The Brothers Grimm, a three-minute film trailer was shown at the 2004 Cannes Film Festival, while twenty minutes of footage was shown at the 2005 event. Miramax spent around $30 million promoting the film.

=== Box office ===
The Brothers Grimm was released in the United States in 3,087 theaters, earning $15.1 million in its opening weekend in second place behind The 40-Year-Old Virgin. The film eventually grossed $37,916,267 in the United States and $67.4 million internationally, coming to a worldwide total of $105,316,267. The Brothers Grimm was shown at the 62nd Venice International Film Festival on 4 September 2005, while in competition for the Golden Lion, but lost to Brokeback Mountain, also starring Ledger.

=== Critical reception ===
The Brothers Grimm was released to mixed reviews from critics. On Rotten Tomatoes the film has an approval rating of 38% based on reviews from 182 critics, with an average score of 5.18/10. The site's consensus states: "The Brothers Grimm is full of beautiful imagery, but the story is labored and less than enchanting." On Metacritic the film has a weighted average score of 51 out of 100 based on 36 reviews, indicating "mixed or average reviews". Audiences surveyed by CinemaScore gave the film a grade "C" on a scale of A to F.

Roger Ebert called the film "an invention without pattern, chasing itself around the screen without finding a plot. The movie seems like a style in search of a purpose, with a story we might not care about."

Stephen Hunter of The Washington Post wrote that "The Brothers Grimm looks terrific, yet it remains essentially inert. You keep waiting for something to happen and after a while, your mind wanders from the hollow frenzy up there with all its filigrees and fretwork."

Mick LaSalle from the San Francisco Chronicle felt "despite an appealing actor in each role, the entire cast comes across as repellent. Will and Jake Grimm are two guys in the woods, surrounded by computerized animals, putting audiences to sleep all over America."

Peter Travers, writing in Rolling Stone magazine, largely enjoyed The Brothers Grimm. He explained that "if you're a Gilliam junkie, as I am, you go with it, even when the script loses its shaky hold on coherence." Travers added, "Even when Gilliam flies off the rails, his images stick with you."

Gene Seymour of Newsday called the film "a great compound of rip-snorting Gothic fantasy and Python-esque dark comedy".

=== Home media ===
Miramax owns the home video rights, while Metro-Goldwyn-Mayer holds the television rights. The DVD release of The Brothers Grimm released 20 December 2005 includes audio commentary by Gilliam, two "making-of" featurettes, and deleted scenes. The film was released on Blu-ray Disc format in October 2006. Both the DVD and Blu-ray were released by Lionsgate Home Entertainment, under license from Miramax.

== Legacy ==
The film served as inspiration for the manga series Blue Exorcist.
