= Story Time (film) =

- Directed by: Terry Gilliam
- Narrated by: Terry Gilliam
- Release date: 1979
- Running time: 9 minutes
- Country: United Kingdom
- Language: English

Story Time is a 1979 short animated comedy compilation film written, directed and animated by Terry Gilliam. It is compiled from several of Gilliam's works from the late 1960s and early 1970s, and stylistically resembles the distinctive animations which Gilliam produced in that period for Monty Python's Flying Circus.

Story Time is composed of three loosely connected animated segments. The first two, "Don the Cockroach" and "The Albert Einstein Story", were originally broadcast within the television series The Marty Feldman Comedy Machine (1971–72), while the third, "The Christmas Card", was created for the 1968 Christmas Special of Do Not Adjust Your Set. It was also shown as an accompaniment to some British theatrical releases of Monty Python's Life of Brian.

== Plot ==
The film begins with an animated version of director Terry Gilliam reading from a children's storybook. The story, "Don the Cockroach", opens with a palace high atop a mountain. Inside the wall of one of its rooms lives a cheerful cockroach named Don, who is shown frolicking and generally enjoying his life as a cockroach. One day, as Don scurries across a kitchen floor, he is suddenly crushed by a foot. The narrator Gilliam remarks that this does not matter, as cockroaches are not very interesting. The story then shifts to the man who crushed Don, then to his brother, then to the brother's friend, then to the friend's employer, and so forth. Eventually the chain of interconnected people reaches a cleaning lady who is involved in a search-and-destroy mission against a colony of cockroaches, one of whom is named Don. The film then loops back to Don, replaying some of the earlier events until a gruff voice interrupts the narrator with "You already said that!" and the sound of a punch. An intertitle appears, announcing that the animator responsible for the previous cartoon has been sacked, and promising that the next one will be better.

The next segment, entitled "The Albert Einstein Story", revolves around an English man who happens to share the name of the famous physicist, and is "quite interesting in his own right". The new narrator says that Einstein is very good with his hands, and that his hands are very good to him. However, they once stayed out late at night, carousing, misbehaving, and even cheating on their owner by shaking other hands. One of the hands was once seen out with a foot, causing a scandal in the upper-class society of hands, who were prejudiced against feet. The film then cuts to a musical extravaganza starring "Fred & Frank Feet & Their Dancing Body". The curtains draw to a close with the sound of a jeering audience, and the words "The End – Yours truly, Terry Gilliam" appear.

Next the film cuts to a segment entitled "The Christmas Card", set on Christmas Day in 1968 London. A lonely old man receives a Christmas card in the post. A series of Christmas cards are then shown coming to life in bizarre ways, connected only by the Three Wise Men, who follow the Star of Bethlehem from one card to another. Suddenly the postman returns and takes the card back, apologising for delivering it to the wrong address.
