= Secret Tournament =

Nike ad campaign

"Secret Tournament" (also known as "Scorpion KO" or "The Cage") was a Nike global advertising campaign coinciding with the 2002 FIFA World Cup. With a marketing budget estimated at US$100 million, the advert featured 24 top contemporary football players and former player Eric Cantona as the tournament "referee". It was directed by film director and Monty Python member Terry Gilliam.

== Synopsis ==
The concept of the advertising campaign was a fictional futsal tournament involving eight teams of three of football's top players in a first-goal-wins elimination. The matches were staged in an enclosed pitch located in a cage on a cargo ship in with retired footballer Eric Cantona acting in the role of referee. The final match ended with the gag of the losers being thrown overboard.

=== Rematch ===
Following the run of the original advert, it was quickly followed up by a "Rematch" advert, featuring the two teams from the original final; in the ad, Cantona brings the two teams to the bilge of a ship, announcing that "the rematch doesn't need a cage" as he paints a crude goal to the side of the ship. The match then proceeds, but ends when after a constant barrage of shots at the ship's hull, Luis Figo's final goal loosens the rivets causing a breach and sinking the ship, forcing the teams to swim ashore.

== Soundtrack ==
The song in the advertisement was a new remix of Elvis Presley's "A Little Less Conversation", remixed by Junkie XL (JXL). Following its appearance, the remix was released as the single "A Little Less Conversation" by "Elvis vs. JXL". The single cover featured both the logo for Scorpion KO and Nike's Swoosh logo. The song went on to become a Number 1 hit in over 20 countries. In the UK, it was one of two songs to reach number 1 off the success of an advert in the 2000s, followed by Room 5's "Make Luv" the following year. The remix later became the sole single from Presley's multi-million-selling hits album ELV1S: 30 No. 1 Hits.

== Campaign instalments ==
The campaign started in March 2002 with the "tease" phase of the campaign, featuring only a shot of football boots and a scorpion. The early ads led viewers to a website where they could learn more about the Secret Tournament and play interactive games.

April saw the start of the "Excite" phase, with the teams facing off against each other, then moved into the "Involve" phase (see Impact).

Besides the TV advertising campaign, the marketing strategy involved the execution of local tournaments in several major capital cities of the world, being held in schools, sport venues and stadiums. The concept was the same: teams of three players had to be registered and one-goal matches were played in successive knock-out rounds up to the final matches in cages like the ones in the TV ads.

=== Edits ===
There are several different edits of the "Scorpion KO" commercials. There are four separate commercials for each match as well as an overall compilation of the matches and a condensed version of the compilation.

== Players ==
Triple Espresso	(France) Thierry Henry	(Italy) Francesco Totti	(Japan) Hidetoshi Nakata
The Onetouchables	(France) Patrick Vieira	(Netherlands) Ruud van Nistelrooy	(England) Paul Scholes
Toros Locos	(Sweden) Freddie Ljungberg	(Argentina) Javier Saviola	(Spain) Luis Enrique
Cerberus	(Netherlands) Edgar Davids	(France) Lilian Thuram	(France) Sylvain Wiltord
Os Tornados	(Portugal) Luís Figo	(Brazil) Roberto Carlos	(Brazil) Ronaldo
Funk Seoul Brothers	(Brazil) Denílson	(Brazil) Ronaldinho	(South Korea) Seol Ki-hyeon
Tutto Bene	(Italy) Fabio Cannavaro	(Czech Republic) Tomáš Rosický	(England) Rio Ferdinand
Equipo Del Fuego	(Argentina) Claudio López	(Spain) Gaizka Mendieta	(Argentina) Hernán Crespo

== Bracket ==
Quarter-finals
Triple Espresso	1
The Onetouchables	0
Toros Locos	0
Cerberus	1
Os Tornados	1
Funk Seoul Brothers	0
Tutto Bene	0
Equipo Del Fuego	1

Semi-finals
Triple Espresso	1
Cerberus	0
Os Tornados	1
Equipo Del Fuego	0

Final
Triple Espresso	1
Os Tornados	0

== Impact ==
Following the airing of the commercials, in June 2002 an estimated 1–2 million children under the age of 16 competed in matches following the Scorpion KO rules in several major cities worldwide, including London (in the Millennium Dome), Beijing, Mexico City (in the then existent Toreo de Cuatro Caminos dome), Buenos Aires, Montevideo, Los Angeles, Madrid, Paris, Marseille, Rotterdam, Santiago, São Paulo, Seoul, Tokyo, Berlin and Rome.

Nike considered the campaign a success, with Nike president Mark Parker commenting, "This spring's integrated football marketing initiative was the most comprehensive and successful global campaign ever executed by Nike."
