= The Man Who Killed Don Quixote =

2018 film by Terry Gilliam

- Theatrical release poster
- Directed by: Terry Gilliam
- Screenplay by: Terry Gilliam; Tony Grisoni
- Based on: Don Quixote by Miguel de Cervantes
- Produced by: Mariela Besuievsky; Gerardo Herrero; Amy Gilliam; Grégoire Melin; Sébastien Delloye
- Starring: Adam Driver; Jonathan Pryce; Stellan Skarsgård; Olga Kurylenko; Jason Watkins; Joana Ribeiro
- Cinematography: Nicola Pecorini
- Edited by: Lesley Walker; Teresa Font
- Music by: Roque Baños
- Production companies: Alacran Pictures; Tornasol Films; Kinology; Entre Chien et Loup; Ukbar Filmes; El Hombre Que Mato a Don Quijote AIE; Carisco Producciones AIE; Recorded Picture Company (Note: Alacran Pictures, Tornasol Films, Kinology, Entre Chien et Loup, Ukbar Filmes, El Hombre Que Mato a Don Quijote AIE, Carisco Producciones AIE, Recorded Picture Company, RTVE, Movistar+, Wallimage, Proximus TV, Shelter Prod, Taxshelter.be, ING, the Portuguese Film Production Tax Incentive, Instituto de la Cinematografía y de las Artes Audiovisuales, Instituto do Cinema e Audiovisual, Eurimages and Televisión Española are all credited as production companies.)
- Distributed by: Sparky Pictures (UK); The Searchers (Benelux); Océan Films (France); Lusomundo (Portugal); Warner Bros. Pictures (Spain)
- Release dates: 19 May 2018 (France); 1 June 2018 (Spain); 25 July 2018 (Belgium); 27 December 2018 (Portugal); 31 January 2020 (UK)
- Running time: 132 minutes
- Countries: UK; Belgium; France; Portugal; Spain
- Language: English
- Budget: €16 million (approx. $18.6 million)
- Box office: $2.5 million

The Man Who Killed Don Quixote is a 2018 adventure–comedy film directed by Terry Gilliam and written by Gilliam and Tony Grisoni, loosely based on the 1605/1615 novel Don Quixote by Miguel de Cervantes. Gilliam tried to make the film many times over 29 years, which made it an infamous example of development hell.

Gilliam started work on the film in 1989 but was unable to secure funding until 1998 when it entered full pre-production with a budget of $32.1 million without American financing, with Jean Rochefort as Quixote, Johnny Depp as Toby Grummett – a 21st-century marketing executive thrown back through time – and Vanessa Paradis as the female lead. Shooting began in 2000 in Navarre, but difficulties such as sets and equipment being destroyed by flooding, the departure of Rochefort due to illness, problems obtaining insurance for the production and other financial difficulties led to a sudden suspension of the production and its subsequent cancellation. The original production was the subject of the documentary film Lost in La Mancha, which was intended to be a making-of but was released on its own in 2002.

Gilliam’s repeated attempts to relaunch production between 2003 and 2016 included Depp, Ewan McGregor and Jack O'Connell as Toby; and Robert Duvall, Michael Palin and John Hurt as Quixote. All were cancelled for various reasons, such as failing to secure funds, Depp's busy schedule and eventual loss of interest in the project, and Hurt being diagnosed with cancer that eventually led to his death. After yet another failed attempt, it was reported in March 2017 that filming had finally started, with Adam Driver, who was confirmed as Toby in 2016 and helped secure funding, and Jonathan Pryce, who had been part of the original 2000 production in a different role, as Quixote.

On 4 June 2017, Gilliam announced that the shooting of the film was complete, 17 years after it originally started. The final version of the film is set in modern-day rural Spain and features Toby as a director, shooting commercials; and "Quixote" as an insane shoemaker convinced that he is the character from Cervantes' novel. The film premiered on 19 May 2018, simultaneously acting as the closing film at the 2018 Cannes Film Festival and being released in French theaters.

Gilliam faced difficulties in the process of releasing the film worldwide, partially due to a lengthy legal dispute with former producer Paulo Branco. Subsequently, the film was only released in a few other countries in 2018; it was released in the US and Canada on 10 April 2019 and in the UK and Ireland on 31 January 2020. It received mostly positive reviews from critics, who praised its creativity and Driver and Pryce's performances but found it "messy". It was a commercial failure, earning $2.5 million against a budget of €16 million (about $18.5 million), plus its original budget of $32 million from 2000. The documentary He Dreams of Giants, a follow-up to Lost in La Mancha, follows the making of the final version of The Man Who Killed Don Quixote. It was released in 2019.

== Plot ==
Toby Grummett, a director, is in rural Spain, struggling with the production of a commercial featuring Don Quixote and Sancho Panza. After an unsuccessful day of shooting, Toby's superior, the Boss, introduces him to a Romani street merchant who sells him an old DVD of The Man Who Killed Don Quixote, a film he wrote and directed ten years earlier as a student. Toby watches the film while in bed with the Boss's wife, Jacqui. When the Boss returns to the hotel room, Toby barely escapes without being recognized.

A flashback shows student Toby casting elderly cobbler Javier Sanchez as Don Quixote. Javier initially falters in his characterization, but upon rushing to defend teenage waitress Angelica when a member of Toby's crew plays a prank on her, succeeds in embodying that "I am Don Quixote".

Toby realizes that his current shoot is near the shooting location of The Man Who Killed Don Quixote. Taking a motorbike to Los Sueños, he learns that Angelica has moved away from her father Raul. Toby meets Javier, now working as a tourist attraction. He discovers that Javier has become convinced that he is the real Don Quixote, and that Toby is his squire, Sancho Panza. Quixote accidentally causes a fire that spreads through the town, as Toby escapes on the motorbike.

On the set, police are investigating the "break in" of Jacqui's room. The police notice that Toby's bike was the one spotted in Los Sueños and take him in for questioning. En route, they encounter Don Quixote on his horse Rocinante, who demands that the officers release Toby. When they dismiss him, Quixote attacks, culminating in one of the officers being shot and the Romani man stealing the police car. Quixote supplies Toby with a donkey and clothes from the set, and they set off for adventures.

Quixote notices a windmill and believes it is a giant attacking a woman. Receiving a head wound after being knocked by one of the windmill's blades, Quixote and Toby are led by the woman to a decrepit ruin occupied by impoverished people. The leader, Barbero, welcomes them warmly but locks them in an attic. That night, Toby comes to suspect that they are secretly terrorists, but soon finds that the ruin has transformed into a 17th-century village and its inhabitants are Moriscos hiding their Muslim faith from the Spanish Inquisition. Toby manages to evade the inquisitors, then awakens the next morning, the night's events having seemingly been a dream, and learns that the residents are not terrorists but fearful undocumented immigrants. Quixote, having experienced Toby's "dream", is regaling them with a tale of it.

Moving on with Quixote, Toby finds a bag of old Spanish gold and attempts to hide it, but accidentally falls down a ravine into a cave. There he re-encounters Angelica, who tells him that she works as an escort. She mounts a horse and rides off, with Toby chasing her.

Quixote finds Toby, and joins him on a quest to find Angelica, but soon enters a jousting match with the "Knight of Mirrors", revealed to be Raul. He and several Los Sueños townspeople had been disguising themselves in an attempt to get Javier to come home. After Quixote rides off, Raul punches Toby for indirectly causing his daughter to become an escort.

Waking up, Toby finds Quixote whipping himself with thorns to prove his love to Dulcinea del Toboso. Healing his wounds by a river, Toby is found by Jacqui on horseback, dressed for a costume party thrown by Alexei Miiskin, a Russian vodka company owner entering a business deal with the Boss. Arriving at Miiskin's castle, Toby learns that Angelica is Miiskin's "property" and sees him behave cruelly towards Angelica and Quixote. Toby tries to convince both of them to leave but Quixote refuses and Angelica is captured. Toby rescues Angelica, but finds it is Jacqui wearing a mask, who reveals that Angelica is being burned alive by Miiskin as part of his entertainment. Toby accidentally knocks Quixote out of a window; dying on the ground, Quixote regains his sanity, asserting he is shoemaker Javier Sanchez and gives Toby his sword, telling him that he never truly saw him as lowly. Angelica's burning is shown to be a special effect and Quixote dies while Toby recalls Quixote's claim of immortality.

The next morning, Toby and Angelica are returning Javier's body to his village for burial. Toby, now Quixote, attacks three windmills, believing them to be giants, with Angelica at his side. The two agree to call her Sancho Panza and they ride into the sunset.

== Cast ==
- Adam Driver as Toby Grummett, a director who comes back to the village where he filmed his student film ten years ago, and whom Quixote mistakes for his trusted squire Sancho Panza. Robin Williams, Johnny Depp, Ewan McGregor, and Jack O'Connell were all previously cast in the role.
- Jonathan Pryce as Javier Sanchez / "Don Quixote", an old Spanish shoemaker who played the part of Quixote in Toby's old student film, but has since become convinced he is actually the famous literary character. John Cleese, Jean Rochefort, Michael Palin, Robert Duvall, and John Hurt were all previously cast in the role; Pryce was also a part of the original 2000 production, in a different role.
- Stellan Skarsgård as The Boss, Toby's superior.
- Olga Kurylenko as Jacqui, the Boss' wife.
- Joana Ribeiro as Angélica Fernández, a young woman who played a supporting role in Toby's film ten years earlier.
- Óscar Jaenada as the Gypsy, a mysterious character who keeps crossing paths with Toby.
- Jason Watkins as Rupert, Toby's ambitious agent.
- Sergi López as the Farmer.
- Rossy de Palma as The Farmer's Wife.
- Hovik Keuchkerian as Raul, Angélica's father.
- Jordi Mollà as Alexei Miiskin, a cruel oligarch.

== Production ==
=== Origins (1989–1997) ===
Terry Gilliam first read the novel in 1989, and started conceptualizing an adaptation right away. He saw a personal project in adapting Don Quixote, as it embodies many of the themes that run through his own work—such as the individual versus society, and the concept of sanity. Instead of a literal adaptation, Gilliam's film was about "an old, retired, and slightly kooky nobleman named Alonso Quixano [who] reads too many chivalric romances. Taking leave of his senses, he sets out to fix the world and revive chivalry, clad in makeshift armor and accompanied by a donkey-owning farmer named Sancho Panza, who serves as his squire".

Gilliam signed a deal with Phoenix Pictures as the studio to make the film in 1990 under the name Don Quixote. Sean Connery was in talks to star as Quixote, but Gilliam disliked the idea because "Quixote is air and Sean is earth". Nigel Hawthorne and Danny DeVito were also in talks to star as Quixote and Panza respectively. However, Gilliam ultimately decided that the budget the studio offered him was too low and dropped from the project to focus on The Defective Detective, another film he ultimately failed to make. Phoenix Pictures chose Fred Schepisi to replace Gilliam, with John Cleese as Quixote and Robin Williams as Panza, and Steven Haft, Quincy Jones and David Salzman as producers. This version would have been based on an old screenplay by Waldo Salt. However, it was officially cancelled in 1997.

In 1997, Gilliam stated, "The years I wasted on this one! I was so frustrated with Hollywood, I went after European money, needing $20 million. And they said, 'You're on.' But I found out I needed more money. [...] That really hurts, that I let a project I'm convinced I'm the best director on the planet to do, slip by."

=== Original aborted production (1998–2000) ===
==== Writing ====
After Schepisi's project collapsed, Gilliam resumed working on the film with co-writer Tony Grisoni, giving it the new name The Man Who Killed Don Quixote. Instead of featuring a man named Alonso Quixano and Sancho Panza, this new version would instead feature Toby (in early versions "Toby Grisoni", as a joke between Gilliam and co-writer Tony Grisoni), a 21st-century marketing executive thrown back through time and who meets Don Quixote. Their version would also have borrowed elements from Mark Twain's 1889 novel A Connecticut Yankee in King Arthur's Court, including its time travel elements; after having failed Don Quixote's original attempt, Gilliam had unsuccessfully tried to adapt A Connecticut Yankee in King Arthur's Court into a film.

==== Development ====
Gilliam announced Don Quixote to be his next project at the UK premiere of Fear and Loathing in Las Vegas in 1998, with pre-production starting the same year. Gilliam, tired with Hollywood wanting creative control on his films, had decided to make the film in Europe instead, which according to him was "one big monstrous problem". It was set to have been one of the biggest continental European films ever made, with a budget of $32.1 million that had been scaled back from an original $40 million, and would have been filmed in Spain and throughout Europe. It was to have been one of Gilliam's most ambitious films, produced without any American financing; according to Gilliam, this budget was "half the money we need". René Cleitman was one of the film's producers. At the time, Gilliam stated, "I hope it's going to be fun. It's been such a long slog to get to this point today." Working Title Films was offered the project, but turned it down because of the needed budget.

==== Casting ====
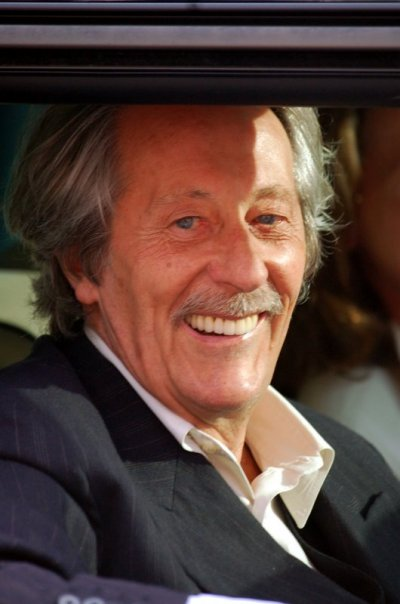
French actor Jean Rochefort, found as "the perfect Quixote" by Gilliam, and hired for the first attempt of the project

Jean Rochefort was picked to play Don Quixote, in preparation for which he spent seven months learning English. Toby was to be played by Johnny Depp, who had starred in Fear and Loathing in Las Vegas, and Vanessa Paradis would have been his love interest. Other actors who were to appear in the film included Miranda Richardson, Christopher Eccleston, Rossy de Palma, Jonathan Pryce, and Sally Phillips.

==== Filming and cancellation ====
Filming started in September 2000, with Nicola Pecorini as cinematographer. The first location shoot was at Bardenas Reales, a scenic, barren area in Navarre, Spain, near a NATO military base. Shortly before filming, the crew unexpectedly found out that several actors had conflicting schedules that would not match each other, making it unsure how and when to film scenes that would feature those same actors at the same time. On the very first day of shooting, F-16 fighter aircraft flew overhead repeatedly, ruining the audio recording and mandating a later re-dubbing in post-production. A flash flood then followed on the second day of filming, washing away and destroying significant portions of equipment and changing the colour of the barren cliffs, making previously filmed material unusable due to continuity issues. The crew spent the next days trying to recover the equipment or obtain new supplies, but it eventually turned out that the film's insurance did not cover the damage caused by the flood. Several actors also did not show up on set for filming.

On the fifth day, filming resumed, but when Rochefort, an able horseman, attempted to ride and act, he was visibly wincing in pain, and required assistance dismounting and walking; he notably suffered from prostate issues, which proved very problematic when riding a horse. This made the newly filmed footage unusable, as Rochefort's pain was obvious on camera, and production was suspended while Rochefort flew hurriedly to his doctor in Paris, where he was additionally diagnosed with a double herniated disc. For several days the crew attempted to shoot scenes that did not involve Rochefort – including a scene with Depp at Monasterio de Piedra – but as time passed, it became unclear whether Rochefort would be able to return or not. Pecorini stated at the time "Never in 22 years of being in this business have I seen such a sum of bad luck." Gilliam was very disappointed by this, as he had spent two years trying to cast the perfect actor for Quixote. Despite his continued efforts, production was finally cancelled in November 2000.

=== Later attempts (2003–16) ===
After the production had been cancelled, an insurance claim was filed on behalf of the film's investors. US$15 million were reportedly paid, and the rights to the screenplay passed on to the insurance companies. From 2003 on, Gilliam kept on trying to make the film, but to no avail. His first new attempt, six months after the release of Lost in La Mancha, was quickly turned down. In 2005, Gilliam voiced his interest in re-casting the role of Don Quixote with Gérard Depardieu. The film quickly gained the reputation of being cursed, notably after the release of Lost in La Mancha, making it even harder for Gilliam to find financial support.

The film had become a legend, and I think financiers don't want to deal with legends, they want to deal with solid things. There was talk of a curse, the curse of Quixote. It's absolute nonsense – but it made financiers very nervous.

— Terry Gilliam on the film's reputation of being cursed.

In the meantime, Gilliam made other films, stating, "Every film I've done since then has been because I couldn't get Quixote made." Those other productions mostly collapsed, like the Nicolas Cage-led The Defective Detective or an adaptation of Terry Pratchett and Neil Gaiman's novel Good Omens (which was cancelled after the September 11 attacks due to the content being judged too dark), or were also met with significant issues: he notably clashed with producers Bob and Harvey Weinstein on the making of The Brothers Grimm, leading to them firing his cinematographer Nicola Pecorini, and had to replace The Imaginarium of Doctor Parnassus's lead actor Heath Ledger after his death halfway through filming.

In July 2006, after nearly six years of legalities between the French producers and German insurers, the issue over the rights was settled. Terry Gilliam announced this at the Munich International Documentary Film Festival, saying that the production company was willing to give Gilliam the rights, and that Jeremy Thomas was still interested in producing. In August 2006, Gilliam indicated at a post-screening Q&A for Tideland that the complex legal case concerning the film's collapse was finally being wrapped up, and that the rights to the script would hopefully be given back to Gilliam and co-writer Grisoni in the near future. He stated his intention to completely reshoot the film.

Johnny Depp was at times still connected to the project, but it remained unclear if Depp's filming schedule would have allowed for his participation and if he wanted to join the production at all. During a press junket in 2009 for his film Public Enemies, Depp stated:

[Gilliam and I] have talked about it. But to be honest, the thing about Terry... I love Terry, and I'd do anything the guy wants to do. But with Quixote... my dance card is pretty nutty for the next couple of years. So I'd hate to put him in a position—or ask to be in a position—where he'd have to wait for me. That would be wrong. But also, I feel like we went there and tried something, and whatever it was—the elements and all the things that got up underneath us—were there and happened and were documented well in that film Lost in La Mancha. So I don't know if it's right for me to go back there. I don't know if it's right for Terry too, but if he wants to...

In 2008, Gilliam restarted preliminary work on a new version of the film. The film would be reshot completely, and Rochefort's role had been recast. In 2008, Michael Palin reportedly entered talks with Gilliam to step in for Rochefort and play Don Quixote. In November 2009, Gilliam said he had finished re-casting the role, but he refused to disclose the actor's identity. In a December 2009 interview with Collider, Robert Duvall claimed on-camera to be Gilliam's new choice for Don Quixote; this was later confirmed by Gilliam, with Depp still attached to co-star as Toby. Since Depp was signed for two Disney films, further production delays were suspected, but commencement of shooting was scheduled for early 2010. Whether the production timetable would have been maintained is unknown, because Depp stated that he would not make room in his tight schedule for Gilliam's film. Depp even noted that he was not sure if he wanted to revisit the revived film project at all. The film was to be produced by Jeremy Thomas for Recorded Picture Company. International sales would have been handled by HanWay Films. On 17 May 2010, it was announced Ewan McGregor had been cast in the film.

Gilliam entered main pre-production once again in 2009. After finally retrieving the rights to the screenplay, Gilliam and Grisoni started to rewrite the plot in January 2009 and hoped to be finished within a month. In 2010, Gilliam stated that primary casting was finalised, with Duvall and McGregor still attached; however on 5 September of the same year, he revealed that funding had collapsed a month and half earlier and as a result shooting was delayed. By 2012, Duvall was still potentially attached to the film, but not McGregor, with Tony Grisoni commenting the same year "Us survivors of Don Q are a strange kind of dysfunctional family. Every year since we have rewritten the screenplay. And we've got quite good at it. You will be pleased to hear the Don is back up and in the saddle and ready to ride under new colours." In November 2013 during the promotion of The Zero Theorem at the Venice Film Festival, Gilliam told Variety "I'm going to try to do it again, [...] We'll see if it happens. I just want to make it and get rid of it. Get it out of my life."

In January 2014, Gilliam published on his Facebook page that "Dreams of Don Quixote have begun again. [...] Will we get the old bastard back on his horse this year?" In an interview with Empire's website, Gilliam stated that production would start up again 29 September 2014 in the Canary Islands. Spanish producer Adrián Guerra was on board to fund the project. Gilliam said of Guerra, "He's really smart, loves movies. He's young enough to still love movies, but we've still got to cast it and get the money but other than that, that's the deal." New concept art by Gilliam collaborator Dave Warren was also released. In August 2014, in an interview with TheWrap, Gilliam revealed that he had received funding, and that the plot of the film has changed: "Our main character actually made a Don Quixote movie a lot earlier in his history, and the effect it had on many people wasn't very nice. Some people go mad, some people turn to drink, some people become whores." In September 2014, actor John Hurt confirmed he had become attached to the film in the titular role of Quixote, replacing Robert Duvall.

In a September 2014 interview with Rolling Stone, Gilliam said that making Don Quixote next "[...] is my plan, but plans have nothing to do with reality. We shall see what happens. I really can't say anything at the moment, because there's been a little hiccup — once again. The Sisyphean rock that keeps rolling back. Just as we almost get to the top of the mountain... We'll see what happens. I'm not a happy camper at the moment." When asked why he continues to attempt making the film, Gilliam said, "Oh, I don't know, pigheadedness, stupid – I really don't know anymore. I'm beginning to actually think, 'If it doesn't work this time, I'm gonna dump it.' I've wasted far too much of my life doing it. If you're going to do Quixote, you have to become as mad as Quixote. [...] I've wasted how many years? Fifteen? Yeah, there's a certain point. It's kind of the determination to be crazy and unreasonable. Every intelligent person around me says, 'Walk away from it.' But those are reasonable people." In November 2014, Jack O'Connell was cast as Toby. Commenting on the changes on the script compared to the original version, Gilliam stated, "It all takes place now, it's contemporary. It's more about how movies can damage people."

On 9 June 2015, Gilliam obtained a deal with Amazon Studios to release the film theatrically, followed by a streaming Amazon debut. Gilliam said of the deal: "I'm intrigued by their way of doing it. They go into the cinemas first and then a month or two afterwards they go into streaming. And I think that's good because you get a chance to see it on the big screen, and yet I know that more people have seen my films on DVD than they have in the cinemas and that's the reality of life now." In September 2015, the film's production was suspended once again, due to Hurt being diagnosed with pancreatic cancer shortly before filming. He eventually died from his cancer on 25 January 2017. Gilliam paid homage to him on Facebook, stating, "Sadly, the earthly marvel that was John Hurt has departed us. Two years ago, he and I were off to make The Man Who Killed Don Quixote when he was diagnosed with a particularly evil brand of cancer. Despite the terrible prognosis he was determined to carry on working. And he did. Right to the final curtain. In the end, cancer was the windmill that he couldn't defeat. John was not just a phenomenal actor, but a wickedly wonderful human being. I felt honoured to be a friend." That same year, original Quixote portrayer Jean Rochefort also died. Gilliam also paid homage to him: "When I saw him a couple of years ago he seemed to be growing younger, not older. I imagined that, like Quixote, he was capable of living forever. That he should be gone is unbelievably sad. Farewell, Jean."

=== With Paulo Branco as producer (2016) ===
I was supposed to start to be shooting it starting next Monday. [...] [Paulo Branco] claimed he'd get all the money together in time. And a few weeks ago, he proved that he didn't have the money. So we are still marching forward. It is not dead. I will be dead before the film is. [...] It's one of those dream nightmares that never leave you until you finish the thing. I want to get this film out of my life so that I can get on with the rest of my life.

— Terry Gilliam in 2016, reacting to yet another failed attempt at making the movie.

At the 66th Berlin International Film Festival in February 2016, Gilliam, in need of a minimum 16 million euros for the budget in order to make the film, was introduced to Portuguese producer Paulo Branco, who promised that he would obtain the needed budget by September, a few weeks before they would start the eleven weeks-long shoot.

With the film having entered pre-production once again, Gilliam cast Palin as Quixote, Adam Driver as Toby, and Olga Kurylenko as the female lead. Reportedly, Driver would have been paid 610,000 euros for the film, with Palin being paid 285,000 euros. Both of them took equitation lessons for the film shortly after being hired. Gilliam hired his daughter Amy Gilliam as unit production manager. The new version would be set in modern day, with Toby as a director shooting a commercial and coming across a copy of his old student film, a re-telling of the famous Don Quixote story, which leads him back to the little Spanish village where he shot it back in the days, only to get embroiled in a series of adventures and catastrophes.

Tensions soon arose, with Branco wanting creative control over the project; however, and despite having been warned against working with Branco, Gilliam believed that he had no other choice than to collaborate with him if he wanted Don Quixote to be filmed in the year, encouraged by Branco's successful financing of David Cronenberg's 2012 film Cosmopolis. Similarly, Branco felt that Gilliam had "a deep hate towards producers". Shortly before the 2016 Cannes Film Festival, Amazon withdrew from the project because of Branco's reputation as producer, with Amazon representative Matthew Heintz sending a mail stating that "in regard of the interactions we had with [Branco], we do not wish to pursue further negotiations with him". Nevertheless, Gilliam stated during the Cannes Film Festival that the film would start shooting in October 2016.

Conflict escalated further when Branco tried to reduce the budget down from the promised 16 million. He also cut Palin's pay from 285,000 euros to 100,000 euros, which deeply angered Palin; when Gilliam wrote to Branco to complain that Palin's unexpected salary cut felt like a "slap on the face", Branco answered that the film needed "a true producer", referring to himself as the "captain" of the project. On 29 April 2016, Gilliam signed a deal where in exchange for producing the film, Branco would earn, in addition to his own salary, the salary of 750,000 euros Gilliam would have been paid for writing and directing the film. In addition to severing ties with several other production companies interested in the project, Branco soon tried to reduce the salaries of other crew members, including the hair stylist, the assistant director, and Amy Gilliam. He also tried to push Palin away from the project, considering him too old, to have his own sister hired as costume designer, to have filming moved forward by several months, and to have the film shot in digital instead of the 35 mm Gilliam wanted. Some of the film's other producers and its distributor stated that Branco told Gilliam "Either you make this film my way, or you irremediably compromise the feasibility of the project and your film is condemned. It will never see the light of day."

Ultimately, Branco did not provide the promised funds for the film. When Gilliam complained, Branco answered that he "would not accept this kind of spoiled kid behavior." On 6 August, Branco sent a mail to Gilliam urging him to accept his conditions, including a reduced budget, and to give Branco full creative control over the project, threatening to cancel the project altogether and fire the entire crew and cast otherwise. Terry Gilliam answered that those demands were unacceptable, and "incompatible with the contract I have signed", while Amy Gilliam called Branco's actions "the behavior of a tyrant and a bully". In response, Branco officially suspended production on 2 October. Gilliam kept on working, however, with new producers, stating, "We should be here [at the Cannes Film Festival] next year with the finished film, and then you can ask me why I made such a mess of it or why I made such a wonderful film."

=== Final production (2016–2018) ===
==== Writing ====
Over the years, Gilliam and Grisoni kept on re-writing The Man Who Killed Don Quixote as they kept on trying to make the film. The most notable change was the removal of the time travelling element central to the original 2000 production; instead of the character of Toby being thrown back through time, the film would instead take place in modern times, with the "period elements" being characters having a party dressed like in the ancient times. Toby would be revisiting a Spanish village he had once filmed a student film in and discover that the shoemaker he had cast in the title role all those years ago has been living as Quixote ever since.

Gilliam stated, "I'm incorporating the idea of the damage that films do to people, so it's become a bit more autobiographical." Jonathan Pryce, who was a part of both the original and final productions, stated, "from what I can remember of the original script, this is an altogether better version. It's a clearer story. Terry's done a lot of rewrites – and he's had a lot of time to do rewrites."

==== Casting ====
After Gilliam found new producers, he started production once again. Driver and Kurylenko were still attached as Toby and the female lead, with Pryce cast as Don Quixote. Pryce had previously starred in Gilliam's films Brazil (1985), The Adventures of Baron Munchausen (1988), and The Brothers Grimm (2005), and was also cast in the original 2000 production of The Man Who Killed Don Quixote in a different role. Gilliam stated, "Jonathan has been wanting to [play Quixote] for 15 years – he's been making my life a misery. And now he's here and he's just extraordinary. The editor, who is Spanish, says that she can never imagine another Quixote. So it's as if the time was right: everything seemed to be ready to make this thing."

Gilliam stated that Driver was the perfect cast choice for Toby, calling him "the guy I've been looking for all these years." Cast members later announced included Joana Ribeiro, Óscar Jaenada, Jason Watkins, Rossy de Palma, and Jordi Mollà.

==== Filming ====
Having found new producers who obtained the needed budget, Gilliam unexpectedly announced in March 2017 that filming had started for the first time since the original 2000 attempt; the announcements of Pryce's role, and Driver and Kurylenko still being attached to their roles, soon followed.

During filming in May, Gilliam stated, "In the end, we're doing this for much less money than we honestly need. But everyone involved, from the cast to the crew, are all working their asses off for a fraction of what they would normally be paid, because they just want to see this thing done. It's odd how being obsessive and not giving up can inspire other people to get involved. Fools that they are!" He also stated, "It was terrifying starting shooting this film finally after, well it originally started in 1989. That's a long time ago! To be thinking, dreaming it, writing and rewriting it, it was a horrible feeling... Yet what's interesting about a film – at a certain point it starts making itself. So it's not actually the film I set out to make. This is a slightly different film. It's doing its own work, and I'm just holding on for dear life!" Driver stated that "Terry couldn't control his enthusiasm, nor how deeply ingrained this movie was within his body. It seemed like an exorcism, every day we were making it." During filming, Gilliam commented on how well they were doing: "I still worry. We've had too much luck, so it could go wrong at any moment. Today, the clouds are building. They'll probably block out the light and we'll have to go home."

On 4 June 2017, Gilliam announced that filming had finally been completed, 17 years after it originally started.

Only a few crew members constantly worked on the film between 2000 and the final product, including Gilliam, his daughter Amy (who co-produced the film), co-writer Tony Grisoni, cinematographer Nicola Pecorini, and production designer Benjamin Fernandez.

==== Post-production ====
In November 2017, Gilliam stated that editing was nearly complete: "We're just fiddling now, figuring out a few things here and there so it's pretty much what it is. We've got still months of work to do on visual effects, sound, music. But as far as the tale, it's pretty tight now and it's surprisingly wonderful". On 23 December, he stated, "The year is almost finished... and so is The Man Who Killed Don Quixote."

In May 2018, at the same time Amazon Studios dropped from the project, Gilliam suffered a minor medical complication that was erroneously reported as a stroke.

==== Convent of Christ controversy ====
During filming in Portugal, Gilliam's team was accused of damaging public properties, as well as the Convent of Christ, a notable convent in Tomar and a UNESCO World Heritage Site. The accusation came from a report by Portuguese news channel RTP1, which stated that the crew had "left behind chipped masonry, broken roof tiles and uprooted trees at the 12th-century Convent of Christ in Tomar, central Portugal." Gilliam denied the accusations, stating, "I think the Convent of Christ is one of the most glorious buildings I have ever seen. Everything we did there was to protect the building from harm... and we succeeded. Trees were not cut down, stones were not broken. [...] There was not an iota of disrespect involved. People should begin by getting the facts before howling hysterically." An investigation by the Portuguese government took place during the following weeks to determine if the news report was accurate, with the presence of "some damage" being acknowledged, which was catalogued by the convent officials who monitored the filming. The destruction of the trees was determined to have occurred during the production of an earlier, unrelated film. On 4 July 2017, Portuguese authorities ruled that Gilliam's crew was only responsible for "insignificant damage", adding that the accusations "lacked rigor and revealed a lack of scientific knowledge".

==== Legal dispute with Paulo Branco ====
Paulo Branco, a former producer of the film, stated in June 2017 that this new version was "illegal" and that he, not Gilliam, owned the rights to the film, and that as such, any content shot for the film was the property of Alfama Films, one of the film's former production companies. Branco was a producer on the film during Gilliam's previous attempt at making it in 2016, and was supposed to find funds for the film; in exchange, Gilliam would give his salary as writer-director to Branco. Eventually, Branco did not provide the funds promised and suspended production only a few weeks before filming, leading Gilliam to find other producers with whom he was able to make the film. However, Branco claimed that he still owned the rights and was still owed Gilliam's salary despite not providing financial backing for the film as planned: according to Gilliam and the film's producers, he asked to be paid a total of 3.5 million euros, with 2 million before the release and 1.5 million afterwards.

Considering that Branco's failure to secure funds nullified their deal, Gilliam tried to have the legal contract invalidated in court twice in early 2017, once in Paris and once in London, so he could use the money from his salary to make the film; however, the court ruled in Branco's favor both times. In spring 2017, Gilliam attempted once again to nullify the contract, but the court of first instance ruled against it. Branco also accused Gilliam of having obtained the new funds for the film illegally, which Gilliam denied, claiming that HM Revenue and Customs was well-aware of the nature of said funds.

The film's current producers answered that Branco's claims were "preposterous" and that he had "no rights whatsoever to Don Quixote". Recorded Picture Company CEO Peter Watson stated, "Senhor Branco's interpretation of the law borders on the picaresque. If he really wants to kill the venerable don, I suggest he takes up jousting." Gilliam himself stated that Branco "wallows in his dark twisted madness dreaming megalomanic triumphs while spreading lies and threats", while Branco stated that Gilliam was "mad and mythomaniac".

As of April 2018, Branco still claimed that the film could not be released without his permission, leading to the issue being debated in court; as a result, the premiere of the film at the 2018 Cannes Film Festival was cancelled. Both Gilliam's lawyer and Océan Films, the French distributor of the film, stated that Branco was actively trying to prevent the film from being included in festivals to pressure the producers into paying him so the issue could be settled in time for festivals, with Océan Films stating that Branco "was never, is not and never will be the producer of Terry Gilliam's Don Quixote", adding that the producers and distributors "would not yield to this attempt at intimidation". They also stated that Branco had previously attempted to have filming cancelled, but that his claim had been rejected by the court on 19 May 2017.

The verdict was originally expected to be delivered on 15 May 2018, but was later delayed to 18 May, one day only before the possible release, where it was ultimately ruled that the film would be authorized to premiere in French cinemas. Branco immediately stated that he would keep on pursuing legal action against Gilliam and the film's release.

Additionally, Branco was also trying to prevent the film from premiering at the Cannes Film Festival, with a hearing taking place on 7 May to decide whether or not the film would be authorized to air at the festival. On 9 May, it was announced that the film would be allowed to premiere at Cannes.

The festival's organizers answered Branco's claims by stating, "The Festival de Cannes' mission is to choose works purely on artistic grounds and the selection must, above all, be with the agreement of the film's director. This is the case here. Past experience had made us aware of possible legal action and of the risks we were running, but as it happens, when we took our decision, there was no opposition to the screening of the film at the festival." They added, "Our entire profession knows that 'forcing matters' has always been Mr. Branco's favorite method, and we should recall that he organized a press conference a few years ago where he denounced the Festival de Cannes because it had not kept a 'promise to select' one of his films. This was an accusation which didn't go anywhere, because the festival does not make promises to select films."

In June 2018, the Paris Court of Appeal ruled in favor of Branco owning all rights to the film; Branco explained that he would seek damages from not only Gilliam (who the Court demanded pay €10,000 ($11,600) to Branco's production company), but to all parties involved in the making, completion, promotion, and screenings of the film. "The ruling means that the rights to the film belong to Alfama. Any exploitation of the film up until now has been completely illegal and without the authorisation of Alfama," said Branco. "We're holding everyone responsible. [...] the film's producers, [Paris-based sales company and producer] Kinology, all the others who supported the film, including those who distributed the film in France [Ocean Films] and the Cannes Film Festival, everyone." Branco said he found it "astounding" that all these parties had continued with the production and exploitation of the film without holding the rights. "The film belongs in its entirety to Alfama. The film was made illegally. It's the first time, I've ever seen so many people embark on a mission to produce and exploit a film, without holding the rights. It's a unique case."

Later that month, it was reported that although the Court ruled in favor of Branco, producer Mariela Busuievsky clarified that Gilliam in fact still retains the rights to the film, saying that Branco overstated his victory in the ruling. Gilliam never shot a frame of the film under the deal with Branco, and as such, the former producer does not own any rights. However, since Gilliam did a poor job of terminating his contract with Branco, there will be a financial settlement that will have to be made between the two parties and the ex-producer has been using this to claim a right to the finished film. Busuievsky went on to say that the latest ruling does say that Gilliam owes €10,000 and there will probably be more money required to settle. However, these financial issues don't affect the film's release. According to the producer, they chose to remain quiet about the actual major details because it didn't feel necessary, but when Branco went public with his victory and claimed rights to the film, they felt they had to step forward and air all the "dirty laundry". The producer said in 2018 that they were making plans for European territories, with US distribution to follow shortly. She said that "there are many options" in regards to US distributors.

== Promotion ==
The first image of the film, showing Don Quixote and Toby riding horses, was released on 21 February 2018. The first trailer was released for the French market on 5 April, featuring French text and subtitles, followed by an English-language trailer the following day.

== Release ==
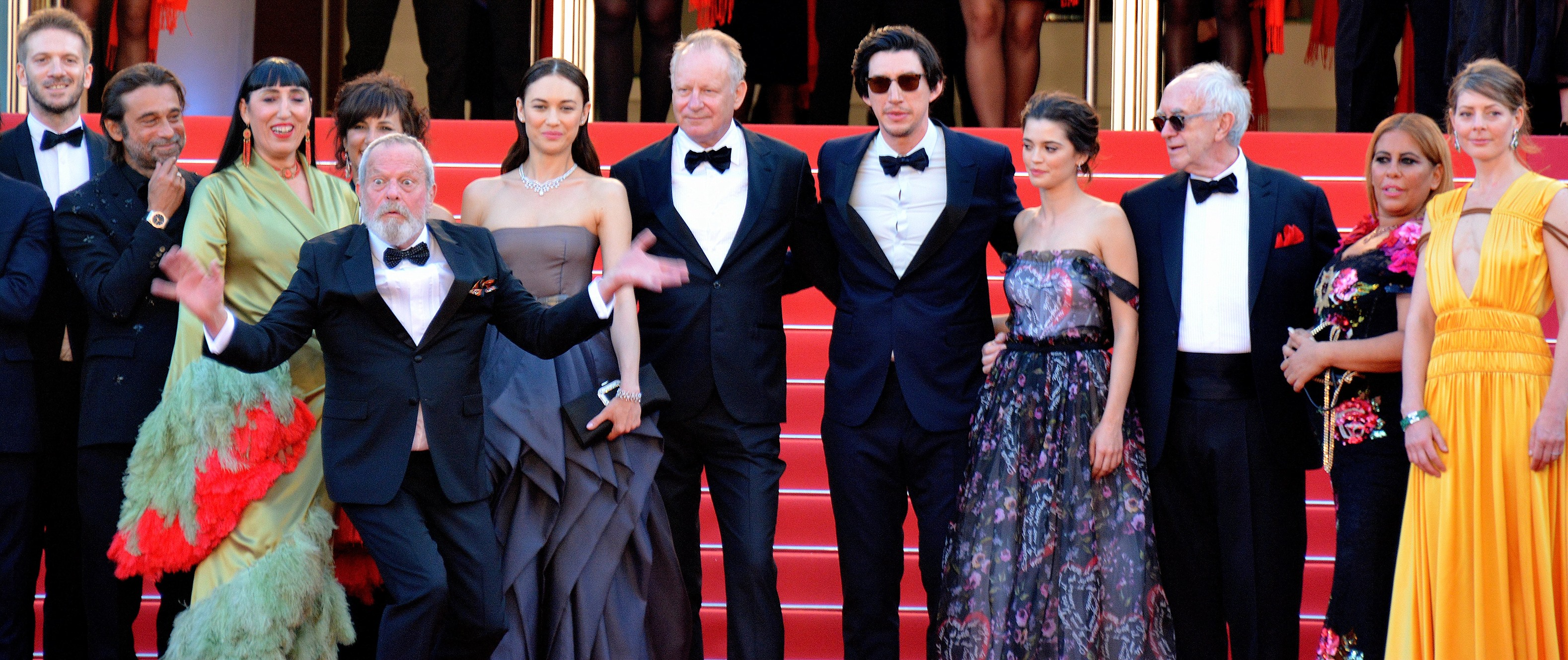
Cast and director at the 2018 Cannes Film Festival

The film premiered on 19 May 2018 as the closing film of the 2018 Cannes Film Festival (where it received a standing ovation), and was released in French theaters the same day.

Paulo Branco, whose legal dispute with Gilliam prevented the film from competing for the Palme d'Or at the Cannes Film Festival, attempted to prevent the film from both being released in France and from being shown at Cannes. A hearing took place on 7 May to debate if the film could be shown at the festival, with the decision expected two days later. On 9 May, the court ruled in favor of the film being shown at Cannes. On May 18, court ruled in Gilliam's favor once again and authorized the film to be released in French theaters the following day; it would have a limited release, and would be shown in 255 theaters across the country. Critics at the Cannes Film Festival received an early screening the day before the release.

On 8 May 2018, despite contributing significant funding to the production, Amazon Studios confirmed that they would no longer distribute the film in the United States. It was released in Spain on 1 June 2018.

The film premiered in Belgium on 20 June at the Brussels international Film Festival, before being released nationwide on 25 June. It was released in China via the Turbo Film production company. On 17 September, Gilliam announced that the film would premiere in the United States on 20 September at Fantastic Fest. On 17 December, Screen Media Films acquired the North American rights to the film and set a March 2019 release. The film was released in the US and Canada on April 10, 2019 as a one night only showing in select theaters through Fathom Events.

As of April 2021, the 132-minute cut of the film is available in the United States on Hulu.

== Reception ==
=== Critical response ===
On the review aggregator website Rotten Tomatoes, 66% of 128 critics' reviews are positive, with an average rating of 6.0/10. The website's consensus reads: "The Man Who Killed Don Quixote may not live up to long-gestating expectations, but it bears enough of director Terry Gilliam's signature creative stamp to satisfy fans." Metacritic, which uses a weighted average, assigned the film a score of 58 out of 100, based on 25 critics, indicating "mixed or average" reviews.

Peter Debruge with Variety called the film "a loud, belligerent, barely coherent mess", stating "the result feels like evidence of someone [Gilliam] who spent too long obsessing over Don Quixote, losing sight somewhere along the way of whatever attracted him in the first place." Gregory Ellwood at Collider felt that the film "simply doesn't live up to its storied legacy in the annals of Hollywood film development", giving it a C rating.

Ben Croll writing for TheWrap called The Man Who Killed Don Quixote "an awful lot of fun. Of course, the fun can be far from perfect. The film is also messy and hysterical in places, and by running an exhausting 132 minutes, it rather insistently overstays its welcome [...] We're so thrilled by the film's improbable existence that we're willing to go wherever Gilliam wants to take us, but respond with an extra degree of disappointment whenever he stumbles along the way." He summarized by saying, "It's too much, it's out of step with today and it's oddly endearing."

Robbie Collin for The Daily Telegraph felt that:

Even when the film feels like a circuitous, effortful mess, it's often an intentional one – and for everything in the film that doesn't quite connect, that element of self-portraiture, with the artist as sap, strikes a wistful chord. [...] Driver and Pryce fling themselves at everything with beady resolve, just as Gilliam gives it everything he has. Around 50 percent of it sticks....But after everything Quixote has been through, 50 percent feels like enough.

Peter Bradshaw at The Guardian stated: "It may not be Gilliam's masterpiece, but it is a movie with sprightliness, innocence and charm and it is a morale boost to anyone who cares about creativity that Gilliam has got the film made at all. His own intelligence and joy in his work shine out of every frame, and his individuality is a delight when so much of mainstream cinema seems to have been created by algorithm."

=== Accolades ===
Award	Date	Category	Recipient(s)	Result	Ref(s)
Goya Awards	2 February 2019	Best Art Direction	Benjamín Fernández	Nominated	
Goya Awards	2 February 2019	Best Production Supervision	Yousaf Bokhari	Won	
Goya Awards	2 February 2019	Best Costume Design	Lena Mossum	Nominated	
Goya Awards	2 February 2019	Best Makeup and Hairstyles	Sylvie Imbert, Amparo Sánchez and Pablo Perona	Won	
Goya Awards	2 February 2019	Best Original Song	"Tarde azul de abril", Roque Baños and Tessy Díez Martín	Nominated	
Location Managers Guild Awards	21 September 2019	Outstanding Locations in Contemporary Film	Ana Ibañez	Nominated	
Magritte Awards	2 February 2019	Best Foreign Film in Coproduction	The Man Who Killed Don Quixote	Won	
Munich International Film Festival	7 July 2018	Best International Film	The Man Who Killed Don Quixote	Nominated	

== Legacy ==
=== Development hell ===
In the years that followed its original cancellation, The Man Who Killed Don Quixote became widely recognized as one of the most infamous examples of development hell in film history, and as one of the most famous films never made, even gaining the reputation of being cursed. IndieWire called the film "one of the most troubled productions in the history of cinema", while /Film believed they "could write a book about the movie's problems", stating, "Heaven and hell seemed to unite in defiance of Terry Gilliam's The Man Who Killed Don Quixote."

Commenting on the making of the film, The Guardian commented on "Mr. Gilliam's visionary project disintegrating like a slow-motion car crash. The double hernia and slipped disc that zonked his lead actor, Jean Rochefort, the flash floods that swept away his camera equipment, the overhead NATO jets which wrecked his soundtrack, the actors who didn't show up, and finally, the implacable money-men who declared that the star's indisposition was not covered by insurance as it was an Act of God. The Act of a furious Old Testament God with a serious grudge against Terry Gilliam". Geeks of Doom called the film's failure a "legendary collapse", while the BBC stated that the film is "synonymous with sustained and calamitous misfortune".

When the final film encountered legal issues due to the dispute with Paulo Branco in 2018, several journalists commented on the issue by stating that regarding the infamously complicated history of the film, its current legal issues were relatively inconsequential, with The Guardian stating, "It's another bump in the long road for this most troubled of productions, though given the director has waited nearly two decades to see his magnum opus on screen, he can stand to hold on for a few more months." The BBC stated before the film's release "It is almost unbelievable that The Man Who Killed Don Quixote is still being wounded by the slings and arrows of outrageous fortune" while Vox stated, "It remains to be seen whether the film is any good. But at this point, it almost doesn't matter. It will be a long time before The Man Who Killed Don Quixote can be seen just as a movie, separate from its long saga of dreams and woes and catastrophes—which may actually be beneficial in the case of a movie about a knight with a foolish dream. The behind-the-scenes saga is part of the film's mystique and history, and whether it's great, terrible, or somewhere in between, that story is what historians, critics, and crowds will remember, long after the movie leaves theaters."

Gilliam himself admitted in May 2017, that the film's legendary reputation added more pressure on him: "The problem is that people have very high expectations. And a lot of people say I'm a fool to make the film, and that it would have been better to let people imagine how great it would have been, rather than making it a reality and disappointing them. People love Roman ruins because they're not complete and you can imagine them. So I may be making a great mistake. Maybe the film would be better as a fantasy."

=== Lost in La Mancha ===
After his 1988 film The Adventures of Baron Munchausen was almost abandoned, Gilliam decided to document the making of all his films in case one of them was canceled. For The Man Who Killed Don Quixote, he asked Keith Fulton and Louis Pepe, who had been in charge of the making-of of his film 12 Monkeys, to film what should have ultimately been its making-of; however, after Don Quixote was canceled, Lost in La Mancha was released in 2002 as a stand-alone documentary film about Gilliam's failed attempt at making the film.

The documentary received critical praise for its relevance on the difficulties inherent to filmmaking, and for its depiction of Gilliam as an artist. BBC called the film "painful to watch: an astonishing 'un-making of' documentary which defines the phrase 'catalogue of disasters'". Olga Kurylenko, who starred in the eventual 2018 film, stated about Lost in La Mancha, "You watch and you think, poor Terry. Why does this have to happen to this wonderful man? He doesn't deserve this. It's just crazy. But it wasn't meant to be, I guess. It wasn't the moment."

=== He Dreams of Giants ===
Keith Fulton and Louis Pepe, the writers and directors of Lost in La Mancha, released a follow-up film, He Dreams of Giants. It covers the entire history of making The Man Who Killed Don Quixote, with particular focus on what happened after the events depicted in Lost in La Mancha. He Dreams of Giants was released on November 10, 2019. Pepe considered the film "more introspective" than Lost in La Mancha, stating:

This is more a film about an internal struggle in an artist's mind. What is it like for an artist to be standing on the brink of actually finishing this project finally? [...] Even on the set we would say the conflicts raging around Terry right now of making the movie are not nearly as interesting as what's going on inside his head.

== See also ==
- List of films featuring fictional films
- The Man Who Killed Don Quixote (soundtrack)

== See also ==
- List of films featuring fictional films
