= Miracle of Flight =

- Directed by: Terry Gilliam
- Written by: Terry Gilliam
- Produced by: Terry Gilliam
- Release date: 1974
- Running time: 5 minutes
- Country: United Kingdom
- Language: English

Miracle of Flight is a 1974 British animated short comedy film written and directed by Terry Gilliam.

== Synopsis ==
"Ever since man first observed the smooth, graceful soaring of a Boeing 707, he has had an unquenchable desire to fly." - Narrator

After a short montage of various birds (and a Boeing 707) in flight, we see several attempts of people attempting to fly themselves. A shepherd attempts flying by flapping his wings, only to land on top of his sheep. Another man constructs a suit shaped like a bird to fly, only to crash upon leaping off a cliff.

Other early attempts includes a man dons bird talon shoes and meets the same fate as the first man. Two more try and also fall off the cliff (one has himself covered in tar and bird feathers, and another flattens his arms, so he can merely glide).

The scene then switch to a "certain country" where a "certain king" gathers his finest scientists at a research center on a high cliff to try and break the flight barrier, but all the king does is kick the scientists off a high cliff all the while loudly commanding "FLY!". But on July 27, 1643, it initially appears that one scientist was successful in being able to fly, but he ends up hitting the ground (the camera was merely turned on its side as he was falling to appear as though he were flying and rotates back to normal after the scientist's impact). "Nope, that's still not right", the king comments. "Next."

A man tried an assisted flight by using seagulls to lift him up into the air. From below, people watch in astonishment, while one elderly woman throws bread crumbs on the pavement, muttering, "Nice little birdies." This ends the man's flight, as the gulls dive bomb to the ground.

Three hundred years later, a man living in Krakatau, East of Miami, invents the airline ticket. Soon everything else fell into place as other people invent various items essential to air travel, such as in-flight movies, sickness bag, stewardesses, the "please fasten your safety belt" sign, and the air terminal.

The final scene depicts a man goes through the airport check-in. He walk down the terminal and checks the flight schedule which announces that Flight 507 for Krakatoa East of Düsseldorf is now boarding at Gate 3. He went to gate where he handed his boarding pass to a stewardess. He walked through that gate just as the pilot wished him a very pleasant flight. Outside the gate, he waits for his flight...which is only getting kicked off the same high cliff where the king kicked off all his scientists several years ago. The short ends with the line his the king saying, "Nope, still not got it."
