= Michael Seresin =

New Zealand cinematographer and film director

Michael Seresin ONZM BSC
- Born: 17 July 1942 (age 84); Wellington, New Zealand
- Years active: 1964–2019
- Relatives: Ben Seresin (brother)

Michael Stephen Seresin (born 17 July 1942) is a New Zealand cinematographer and film director.

== Life and career ==
He is the son of Harry Seresin (1919–1994), who was a key figure in the hospitality and café scene in Wellington, and brother of Ben Seresin, who is also a cinematographer.

In addition to his work in film, Seresin is a winemaker, having founded Seresin Estate in the Marlborough wine region in 1992.

In the 2009 New Year Honours, Seresin was appointed an Officer of the New Zealand Order of Merit, for services to the film and wine industries.

His home in Queen Charlotte Sound, New Zealand was featured on the BBC's The World's Most Extraordinary Homes.

On the evening of 7 April 2026, his grandson Finbar Sullivan was stabbed to death in London.

== Filmography ==
Short film

Year	Title	Director	Notes
1973	The Table	Adrian Lyne	
2006	Parc Monceau	Alfonso Cuarón	Segment of Paris, je t'aime
2010	The Man Who Married Himself	Garrick Hamm	
2012	The Cab-Ride	Vanya Peirani-Vignes	
2014	Retrospective	Garrick Hamm	

Feature film

Year	Title	Director	Notes
1972	The Ragman's Daughter	Harold Becker	
1976	Attention les yeux !	Gérard Pirès	
1976	L'Ordinateur des pompes funèbres	Gérard Pirès	
1976	Bugsy Malone	Alan Parker	With Peter Biziou
1976	No Hard Feelings	Alan Parker	TV movie
1977	Sleeping Dogs	Roger Donaldson	
1978	Midnight Express	Alan Parker	
1980	Foxes (Note: Also credited as associate producer)	Adrian Lyne	With Leon Bijou
1980	Fame	Alan Parker	
1982	Shoot the Moon	Alan Parker	
1984	Birdy	Alan Parker	
1987	Angel Heart	Alan Parker	
1988	Rambo III	Peter MacDonald	Uncredited
1990	Come See the Paradise	Alan Parker	
1996	City Hall	Harold Becker	
1998	Mercury Rising	Harold Becker	
1999	Angela's Ashes	Alan Parker	
2001	Domestic Disturbance	Harold Becker	
2003	The Life of David Gale	Alan Parker	
2004	Harry Potter and the Prisoner of Azkaban	Alfonso Cuarón	
2006	Step Up	Anne Fletcher	Role: Custodian
2010	All Good Things	Andrew Jarecki	
2010	Hippie Hippie Shake	Beeban Kidron	Unreleased
2014	Dawn of the Planet of the Apes	Matt Reeves	
2017	War for the Planet of the Apes	Matt Reeves	
2018	Mowgli: Legend of the Jungle	Andy Serkis	
2021	Gunpowder Milkshake	Navot Papushado	

Director

- Homeboy (1988)

== Awards and nominations ==
Year	Award	Category	Title	Result	Ref.
2000	BAFTA Awards	Best Cinematography	Angela's Ashes	Nominated	
2007	Camerimage	Duo Award: Cinematographer–Director (shared with Alan Parker)		Won	

== See also ==
- List of celebrities who own wineries and vineyards
