= Adrian Lyne =

English film director (born 1941)

- Born: 4 March 1941 (age 85); Peterborough, England
- Education: Highgate School
- Occupations: Film director; film producer; screenwriter
- Years active: 1976–present
- Spouse: Samantha Lyne (m. 1974)
- Children: 4
- Relatives: Oliver Lyne (brother)

Adrian Lyne (born 4 March 1941) is an English film director. His films are known for sexually charged narratives that explore conflicting passions, the power of seduction, moral ambiguity, betrayal, and the indelibility of infidelity.

In the mid 1970s, he directed television commercials for DIM Lingerie (France), before switching to feature-length films in 1980 with Foxes. He would later direct Flashdance, 9½ Weeks, Fatal Attraction, Jacob's Ladder, Indecent Proposal, Lolita, and Unfaithful. Lyne received a nomination for the Academy Award for Best Director for Fatal Attraction.

Along with Hugh Hudson, Alan Parker, Ridley Scott, and Tony Scott, Lyne was part of the "Adland Five" of British directors operating in the late 1970s and early 1980s, who first established themselves in the advertising world, before going on to Hollywood success. The group's influence has been cited by the likes of Christopher Nolan and Christopher Frayling.

== Early life ==
Lyne was born in Peterborough, Northamptonshire (now Cambridgeshire), and raised in London. He was educated at Highgate School in North London, together with his younger brother, Oliver Lyne (1944–2005), a classical scholar and academic at the University of Oxford. Their father was a teacher at the school.

== Career ==
An avid moviegoer during his school days at Highgate, he was inspired to make his own films by the work of French New Wave directors like Jean Luc Godard, François Truffaut and Claude Chabrol. Lyne was among a generation of British directors in the 1970s, including Ridley Scott, Alan Parker, Tony Scott and Hugh Hudson, who would begin their career making television commercials before going on to have major success in films. Their techniques in making commercials were admired and copied by major names in the film industry, with Lyne stating: "I remember making this advertisement up in Yorkshire when I got a message that Stanley Kubrick had called. He'd seen an ad I'd made for milk in which I'd used a particular type of graduated filter. He wanted to know exactly which filter I'd used." Two of Lyne's early short films, The Table (1973) and Mr Smith (1976), were entries in the London Film Festival. He had a successful commercials company with Terry Bedford and Gower Frost.

Lyne made his feature filmmaking debut in 1980 with Foxes, a look at the friendship of four teenage girls growing up in the San Fernando Valley, starring Jodie Foster.

His next film, 1983's Flashdance, was an innovative blend of rock 'n' roll, new dance styles, and visual imagery. Lyne's visuals (reminiscent of his 1970s UK commercials for Brutus Jeans), wedded to Giorgio Moroder's score, propelled the story of an aspiring ballerina (Jennifer Beals, in her film debut) who works in a factory by day and dances in a club at night. The film generated over $200 million worldwide and was the third highest-grossing film of 1983. The film was also nominated for four Academy Awards, with the theme song, "What a Feeling", winning the Oscar for Best Song. In 1986, Lyne attracted controversy with 9½ Weeks. Based on a novel by Elizabeth McNeill, the tale of a sexually abusive relationship starred Mickey Rourke and Kim Basinger. Although considered too explicit by its American distributor, and cut for U.S. release, it became a huge hit abroad in its unedited version.

Lyne's fourth film was Fatal Attraction, which generated over $320 million worldwide, making it the highest-grossing film of 1987. Based on James Dearden's British erotic thriller Diversion, the story of a happily married lawyer (Michael Douglas) who tries to break off an affair with an attractive single woman (Glenn Close), only to have her become obsessed with him and endanger his family, the film struck a chord with audiences. Deemed "the zeitgeist hit of the decade" by Time magazine, Fatal Attraction earned six Academy Award nominations including Best Picture, Best Director, Best Actress (Glenn Close), Best Supporting Actress (Anne Archer), Best Screenplay and Best Editing.

In 1990, Lyne directed Jacob's Ladder. Written by Academy Award-winner Bruce Joel Rubin (Ghost) and starring Tim Robbins, Elizabeth Peña and Danny Aiello, the film takes audiences on a journey through Vietnam veteran Jacob Singer's (Robbins) post-war life where apparent reality is interleaved with nightmarish hallucinations, leading to a twist ending. With Indecent Proposal, Lyne examined how the sexes look at relationships and money. Starring Robert Redford, Woody Harrelson and Demi Moore, Indecent Proposal became a worldwide box office hit.

Lyne's version of Lolita, based on the novel by Vladimir Nabokov and starring Jeremy Irons, was filmed for theatrical release in 1997, but American distributors shied away from it due to its controversial subject matter. The film premiered on Showtime and was so well-received that national theatrical distribution soon followed. His next film, Unfaithful, was loosely based on Claude Chabrol's La Femme Infidèle. The movie stars Richard Gere and Diane Lane in a story of a marriage threatened by infidelity and murder. Lane received much praise for her performance, and was nominated for a Golden Globe Award and an Academy Award for Best Actress.

=== Twenty-year gap ===
After Unfaithful, Lyne did not direct another film for twenty years.

In 2005, Lyne was reportedly linked to Warner Bros.' biopic of Johnny Stompanato, with Keanu Reeves portraying him and Catherine Zeta-Jones set to star as Lana Turner. In 2006, Lyne was committed to directing Two Minutes to Midnight, a Sheldon Turner–scripted thriller for 20th Century Fox. In 2007, he was circling to direct Prince of Thieves, which later became The Town. In 2012, Lyne was in talks to direct a film adaptation of the John Grisham novel The Associate. In 2015, there was talk of him directing Nicole Kidman in an adaptation of the 2013 A.S.A. Harrison novel Silent Wife. The next year, Michael Douglas and Halle Berry were connected to another Lyne project called Silence. As of 2022, none of these projects have come to fruition.

=== Return to directing ===
He most recently directed the erotic thriller Deep Water, based on a novel by Patricia Highsmith. Disney's 20th Century Studios released the film on Hulu in the United States and on Amazon Prime Video in other countries. It is Lyne's first directorial effort in 20 years, and the first erotic film released by Disney since Color of Night in 1994.

== Filmography ==
Year	Title	Director	Writer	Notes
1973	The Table	Yes	Yes	Short films
1976	Mr. Smith	Yes	Yes	Short films
1980	Foxes	Yes	No	
1983	Flashdance	Yes	No	
1986	9½ Weeks	Yes	No	
1987	Fatal Attraction	Yes	No	
1990	Jacob's Ladder	Yes	No	
1993	Indecent Proposal	Yes	No	
1997	Lolita	Yes	No	
2002	Unfaithful	Yes	No	Also producer
2018	Back Roads	No	Yes	Initially attached to direct
2022	Deep Water	Yes	No	
