= Cherie Lunghi =

English actress (born 1952)

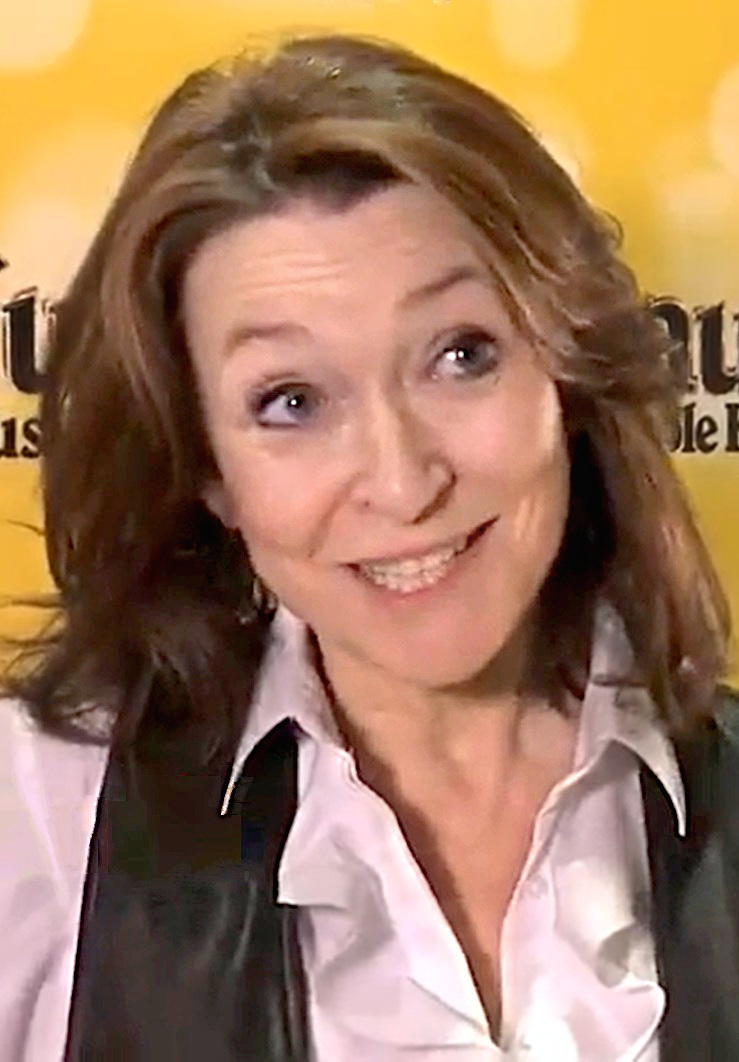
- Lunghi in 2015
- Born: Cherie Mary Lunghi; 4 April 1952 (age 74); Nottingham, England
- Education: Royal Central School of Speech and Drama
- Occupations: Actress; voice-over artist
- Years active: 1975–present
- Known for: Excalibur; The Buccaneers
- Spouse: Ralph Lawson (m. 1975; div. 1976)
- Children: Nathalie Lunghi

Cherie Mary Lunghi (born 4 April 1952) is an English film, television, theatre actress and voice-over artist. She is known for her roles in many British dramas. Her international fame stems from her role as Guenevere in the 1981 film Excalibur. Lunghi's long list of screen, stage and TV credits includes football manager Gabriella Benson in the 1990s television series The Manageress and a series of advertisements for Kenco coffee. She also competed in the 2008 series of Strictly Come Dancing. She is the mother of the actress Nathalie Lunghi.

== Early life ==
Lunghi was born in Nottingham. Her father, Alessandro Lunghi, was Italian. She was raised by her mother, aunt and grandmother, seeing her father only occasionally. Lunghi has described herself as feeling "different" as she did not have a mother and father like other children.

== Career ==
Educated at London's Arts Educational School, Lunghi played Hedvig in The Wild Duck and Alice in Alice in Wonderland on BBC radio while still at school. After graduating from Homerton College, Cambridge and London's Central School of Speech and Drama, she joined the Royal Shakespeare Company in the late 1970s, taking leading roles such as Perdita, Celia, and Viola. She had a starring role in the 1979 British short film Diversion (the prototype for the 1987 U.S. film Fatal Attraction). In 1981, she landed the role of Guenevere in the film Excalibur.

She starred in the 1982 television serial Praying Mantis, based on the book (Les Mantes Religieuses) by Hubert Monteilhet. The thriller co-starred Pinkas Braun, Carmen du Sautoy, and Jonathan Pryce. In 1985 Lunghi played Michal in King David alongside Edward Woodward and Richard Gere. She also appeared alongside Robert De Niro in The Mission. Lunghi told author Paul Stenning: "It was wonderful working with him, it was extraordinary actually. He transforms right in front of you. You are aware when watching him on screen that he has transformed – he is not Robert De Niro – he is somebody else. I don't think you can learn how to do that; it's just the power of your imagination."

In the mid-1980s, she relocated to Los Angeles for eight years, but returned to England to care for her mother. After the birth of her daughter, she took various short-term parts, including playing the band members' mutual love interest in the music video for Level 42's song "Something About You". Lunghi has described how she had been working during pregnancy and was working again three months after giving birth, saying: "it was working mother guilt. I was juggling and balancing, trying to be fair to my career and to my child. Nathalie would come everywhere with me."

Lunghi took on the lead role in football drama The Manageress (1989–90), and participated in the BBC adaptation of Edith Wharton's posthumously published novel, The Buccaneers (1995), as Laura Testvalley. In addition to film and television work, she appeared in a long-running advertising campaign on British television for Kenco coffee from the late 1990s onwards.

In 2006, Lunghi appeared on television in Casualty 1906, playing Matron Eva Luckes, and had a recurring guest role in the regular Casualty series as Professor Camille Windsor. In 2013, she narrated some episodes of the BBC genealogy series Who Do You Think You Are?.

=== Strictly Come Dancing ===
In 2008, she competed in the sixth series of BBC television's Strictly Come Dancing (14-week run), partnered by James Jordan. After her first dance, the Foxtrot on the Ladies Night in week two, she scored the highest points of the first two weeks (33). She beat this score with another series-best score of 35/40 for the rumba to finish week four atop the remaining 12 contestants with an average score of 34/40. The score for her third dance, the American Smooth, was an impressive 34 to maintain her average, though she slipped to 31/40 for the Paso Doble, and further to 26/40 on her fifth outing, in the Salsa. She returned to form the following week with a Waltz, scoring 36/40, and was joint first on the leaderboard.

She was voted off the competition on 16 November 2008 (week nine), losing by three votes to one in the dance-off against model Lisa Snowdon after performing a Cha-Cha-Cha. In the January–February 2009 Strictly Tour, she danced an American Smooth and a rumba with James Jordan.

== Personal life ==
Lunghi was briefly married to South African student Ralph Lawson after the pair met while studying at London's Central School of Speech and Drama. The 1975 marriage was one of convenience so that Lawson could remain in the UK. The couple never lived together as husband and wife, instead staying in separate homes in Newcastle. Lawson moved back to South Africa two years later to take a new job. She has a daughter, Nathalie Lunghi, with the director Roland Joffé.

== Filmography ==
Year	Title	Role
1980	Diversion	Erica
1981	Excalibur	Guenevere
1985	King David	Michal
1985	Parker	Jenny Parker
1986	Harem	Usta
1986	The Mission	Carlotta
1986	Letters to an Unknown Lover	Helene
1987	Coast to Coast	Susan
1988	Intrigue	Adriana
1988	To Kill a Priest	Halina
1990	Ransom	Claire Stein
1993	Silent Cries	Audrey
1994	Mary Shelley's Frankenstein	Baroness Frankenstein (Victor's mother)
1995	Jack and Sarah	Anna
1997	An Alan Smithee Film: Burn Hollywood Burn	Myrna Smithee
2001	Back to the Secret Garden	Lady Mary Craven
2004	Viper in the Fist	Miss Chilton
2011	Love's Kitchen	Margaret
2018	Patrick	Rosemary

== Television ==
Year	Title	Role	Notes
1964	The Valiant Varneys		Episode: "The Incredible Adventures of James Rupert Varney"
1967	A Pretty Row of Pretty Ribbons	The young girl	
1968	Sherlock Holmes	Emily	Episode: "The Second Stain"
1969	Dr. Finlay's Casebook	Kirstie (Antonio)	Episode: "The Visitation"
1973	The Brontës of Haworth	Student	Episode: "Home and Abroad"
1976	Peter and the Princess	Princess	
1976	Bill Brand	Alex Ferguson	
1978	Edward and Mrs. Simpson	Lady Thelma Furness	
1978	The Comedy of Errors	Ephesus Townsperson	
1978	Play of the Month	Anna Danby	Episode: "Kean"
1979	Prince Regent	Princess Charlotte	Episode: "Milk and Honey"
1980	Festival	Celimene	Episode: The Misanthrope
1980	Armchair Thriller	Stephanie	Episode: "Dead Man's Kit"
1980	'Tis Pity She's a Whore	Annabella	
1981	Tales of the Unexpected	Karen Masterson	Episode: "Death in the Morning"
1981	The Agatha Christie Hour	Lady Noreen Elliot	"The Manhood of Edward Robinson"
1981	If Winter Comes	Csöppi/Ilóna	
1982	Playhouse	Emily	Episode: "Preview"
1982	Oliver Twist	Nancy	
1982	Praying Mantis	Beatrice Manceau	
1982	Jackanory	Storyteller	Episodes: "Puss in Boots", "Jack and the Beanstalk" and "Cinderella"
1983	Play of the Month	Celimene	Episode: "The Misanthrope"
1983	The Sign of Four	Mary Morstan	
1984	Play for Today	Sue	Episode: "Desert of Lies"
1984	Strangers and Brothers	Margaret Davidson/Eliot	
1984	Master of the Game	Margaret Van der Merwe	
1984	Ellis Island	Una Marbury	
1984	BBC Television Shakespeare	Beatrice	Episode: Much Ado About Nothing
1984	Bones	Jenny Parker	
1985	Vicious Circle	Estelle	
1985	"Something About You" by Level 42	Love interest	Music video
1985	The Daughter-in-Law	Minnie	
1986	Harem	Usta	
1986	The Monocled Mutineer	Dorothy	
1987	Screen Two	Susan	Episode: "Coast to Coast"
1987	Coast to Coast	Susan	
1987	The Lady's Not for Burning	Jennet Jourdemayne	
1988	The Man Who Lived at the Ritz	Lili	
1989	The Manageress	Gabriella Benson	
1990	The Ruth Rendell Mysteries	Natalie Arno	Episode: "Put on by Cunning"
1991	The Strauss Dynasty	Jetti	
1992	Covington Cross / Charing Cross	Lady Elizabeth	
1993	A Question of Guilt	Helen West	
1995	The Buccaneers	Laura Testvalley	
1996	Strangers	Joan	Episode 1 of Canadian TV series
1996	The Canterville Ghost	Lucille Otis	
1996	Moloney	Sarah Bateman	
1998	Little White Lies	Julia	
1999	Hornblower	Duchess of Wharfedale/Kitty Cobham	Episode: "The Duchess and the Devil"
1999	David Copperfield	Mrs Steerforth	
2000	A Likeness in Stone	Merie Kirschman	
2001	EastEnders	Jan Sherwood	
2002	The Inspector Lynley Mysteries	Sarah Gordon	Episode: "For the Sake of Elena"
2002	Waking The Dead	Leah Gold	Episode: "Thin Air"
2002	The Seasons Alter	Titania	
2003	Cutting It	Zinnia Raggitt	
2003	Midsomer Murders	Lillian Webster	Episode: "The Green Man"
2003	New Tricks	Diane Loveless	Episode: "Good Work Rewarded"
2004	The Brief	Cleo Steyn	
2005	Agatha Christie's Marple	Sadie Swettenham	Episode: "A Murder is Announced"
2006	Dalziel & Pascoe	Kay Miclean	Episode: "Houdini's Ghost"
2006	Casualty 1906	Matron Eva Luckes	
2007	Hotel Babylon	Mrs Poldark	
2007–2011	Secret Diary of a Call Girl	Stephanie	Series regular
2007–2008	Casualty	Camille Windsor	2 episodes
2008	Casualty 1907	Matron Eva Luckes	
2008	A Touch of Frost	Detective Sergeant Annie Marsh	Episode: "Dead End"
2008	Apparitions	Woman	Episode 6
2008	Strictly Come Dancing	Herself	
2009	Casualty 1909	Eva Luckes	
2011	Lewis	Grace Orde	Episode: "The Gift of Promise"
2013	Who Do You Think You Are?	Narrator	
2013	Pat & Cabbage	Cabbage (Jean)	
2013	Death in Paradise	Jayne Smythe	Episode: "Death in the Clinic"
2014	Holby City	Kathy David	Episode: "Self Control"
2014	Wizards vs Aliens	Eva Starling	Episode: "The Quantum Effect"
2016	Midsomer Murders	Alexandra Monkford	Episode: "A Dying Art"
2022	Strike	Gloria Conti	Episode: "Troubled Blood"

== Radio ==
Date	Title	Role	Director	Station
12 Mar 1965	The Raft of the Medusa	Second girl	Archie Campbell	Network Three
21 Apr 1965	The Long Childhood	Marilyn	Hugh Stewart	BBC Home Service Afternoon Theatre
1 Jul 1965	A Day Like Sunday	Alison	Charles Lefeaux	Network Three
27 Sep 1965	The Wild Duck	Hedvig	Charles Lefeaux	BBC Home Service
26 Jan 1966	Quiet Wedding	Miranda Bute	David H. Godfrey	Light Programme Midweek Theatre
28 Feb 1966	The Turn of the Screw	Flora	John Tydeman	BBC Home Service
13 Apr 1966	The Monument	Fanny's children	Douglas Cleverdon	Network Three
23 May 1966	International Couriers: The Kidnappers	Judith Carroway	David H Godfrey	Light Programme
26 Jul 1966 – 13 Sep 1966	The Dark Rising	Mary Durban	David H Godfrey	Light Programme
20 Feb 1967	Ye Daughters of Jerusalem	Debbie Hudson	Charles Lefeaux	BBC Home Service
29 Apr 1967	When Sam was King	Gail Fleming	Brian Miller	BBC Home Service Saturday-Night Theatre
30 Jan 1969	Kittens Are Brave	Barbara Shiplake	Charles Lefeaux	BBC Radio 3
25 Dec 1969	Alice's Adventures in Wonderland	Alice	Charles Lefeaux	BBC Radio 4
6 Jun 1972	Golden Ring on my Finger	Clara	Richard Keen	BBC Radio 4
31 May 1975	Blood Sport	Lynnie Keeble	David H. Godfrey	BBC Radio 4 Saturday-Night Theatre
7 Oct 1975	Lost Yer Tongue?	Janet	Tony Cliff	BBC Radio 3 Drama Now
4 Apr 1986 – 11 Apr 1986	Joyous Days in the Desert	Janet Ross	Brian Miller	BBC Radio 4
21 Sep 1986	Six Characters in Search of an Author	the Step-daughter	Walter Acosta	BBC Radio 4 & BBC World Service
30 Jul 1988	Peter Ibbetson	Mary Duchess of Towers	Brian Miller	BBC Radio 4 Saturday-Night Theatre

== Theatre ==
Her stage credits include:

Date	Title	Role	Director	Company / theatre
25 October 1972 – 27 October 1972	The Country Wife	Alithea	David Terence	Royal Central School of Speech and Drama / Embassy Theatre, London
26 December 1974 – 1975	Canterbury Tales	Nun	Roger Chapman	Nottingham Playhouse Company / Nottingham Playhouse
30 January 1975 –	She Stoops to Conquer	Miss Kate Hardcastle	Robert Knights	Nottingham Playhouse Company / Nottingham Playhouse
20 March 1975 –	Major Barbara	Sarah	Prunella Scales	Nottingham Playhouse Company / Nottingham Playhouse
1975	Teeth 'n' Smiles	Laura		English Stage Company / Royal Court Theatre, London
5 April 1976 – 1977	Much Ado About Nothing	Hero	John Barton	Royal Shakespeare Company / Royal Shakespeare Theatre, Stratford-on-Avon
10 March 1977 – 7 April 1977	Much Ado About Nothing	Hero	John Barton	Royal Shakespeare Company / Theatre Royal, Newcastle upon Tyne
29 June 1977 –	Much Ado About Nothing	Hero	John Barton	Royal Shakespeare Company / Aldwych Theatre, London
28 September 1976 –	Destiny	Liz and Carol	Ron Daniels	Royal Shakespeare Company / The Other Place, Stratford-on-Avon
29 March 1977 – 9 April 1977	Destiny	Liz and Carol	Ron Daniels	Royal Shakespeare Company / Gulbenkian Studio, Newcastle-upon-Tyne
10 May 1977 –	Destiny	Liz and Carol	Ron Daniels	Royal Shakespeare Company / Aldwych Theatre, London
17 January 1977 –	The Boy Friend	Maisie	Gillian Lynne	Royal Shakespeare Company / Royal Shakespeare Theatre, Stratford-on-Avon
25 March 1977 – 2 April 1977	The Phoenix and the Turtle	Roberta	Peter Stevenson	Gulbenkian Studio, Newcastle-upon-Tyne
1 June 1976 –	The Winter's Tale	Perdita	John Barton	Royal Shakespeare Company / Royal Shakespeare Theatre, Stratford-on-Avon
1 November 1977 –	The Days of the Commune	Genevieve	Howard Davies	Royal Shakespeare Company / Aldwych Theatre
26 July 1977 – 1977	That Good Between Us	Rhoda	Barry Kyle	Royal Shakespeare Company / Warehouse Theatre, London
3 August 1977 –	Bandits	Madeline and Pat	Howard Davies	Royal Shakespeare Company / Warehouse Theatre
2 May 1977 –	King Lear	Cordelia	Trevor Nunn	Royal Shakespeare Company / Aldwych Theatre
15 September 1978 – 1978	As You Like It	Celia	John Caird; Trevor Nunn	Royal Shakespeare Company / Aldwych Theatre
21 December 1978 – 1979	Saratoga	Lucy Carter	Ronald Eyre	Royal Shakespeare Company / Aldwych Theatre
12 June 1979 – 1980	Twelfth Night	Viola	Terry Hands	Royal Shakespeare Company / Royal Shakespeare Theatre
11 March 1980 –	Twelfth Night	Viola	Terry Hands	Royal Shakespeare Company / Theatre Royal, Newcastle upon Tyne
11 April 1980 –	Twelfth Night	Viola	Terry Hands	Royal Shakespeare Company / Aldwych Theatre
7 May 1982 –	Uncle Vanya	Yelena Andreyevna	Michael Bogdanov	National Theatre Company / Lyttelton Theatre, London
14 January 1987 –	Holiday	Julia Seton	Lindsay Anderson	Old Vic, London
3 January 1990 – 1991	The Homecoming	Ruth	Peter Hall	Comedy Theatre, London
21 June 2000 – 9 September 2000	Passion Play	Eleanor	Michael Grandage	Comedy Theatre, London
