= Nathalie Lunghi =

English actress (born 1986)

- Born: Nathalie-Kathleen Mary Lunghi-Joffé; 26 August 1986 (age 39); London, England
- Occupation: Actress
- Parent(s): Cherie Lunghi; Roland Joffé
- Relatives: Rowan Joffé (half-brother)

Nathalie-Kathleen Mary Lunghi-Joffé (born 26 August 1986) is an English actress.

The daughter of actress Cherie Lunghi and director Roland Joffé, and half-sister of Rowan Joffé, she had roles as Geri West in the BBC Three teen drama The Things I Haven't Told You and Princess Isabelle in the ITV1 comedy drama The Palace.

== Filmography ==
=== Film ===
Year	Title	Role	Notes
2004	Layer Cake	Charlie	
2008	The Things I Haven't Told You	Geri West	

=== Television ===
Year	Title	Role	Notes
2005	Jericho	Anne Wellesley	TV series
2008	The Palace	Princess Isabelle	TV series
