= Fatal Attraction (play) =

Play

- 2014 production poster
- Written by: James Dearden
- Genre: Thriller

Premiere
- Date premiered: 25 March 2014
- Place premiered: Theatre Royal Haymarket

Fatal Attraction is a 2014 play adapted from his original screenplay by James Dearden. It is based on the 1987 film Fatal Attraction, and it opened in London's West End at the Theatre Royal Haymarket on 25 March 2014, following previews from 8 March.

== Production history ==
Fatal Attraction is a thriller written by James Dearden adapted from his original screenplay of the 1987 film Fatal Attraction. The production is directed by Sir Trevor Nunn and produced by Robert Fox and Patrick Ryecart. Officially confirmed on 19 September 2013, with tickets going on sale the following day the play began previews on 8 March 2014, before making its world premiere at the Theatre Royal Haymarket on 25 March, for a fifteen-week run booking until 21 June 2014. Rehearsals for the show began on 29 January, with title casting including Mark Bazeley as Dan Gallagher, Kristin Davis as Beth Gallagher and Natascha McElhone playing Alex Forrest.

== Principal roles and original cast ==
Character	Original West End performer
Alex Forrest	Natascha McElhone
Dan Gallagher	Mark Bazeley
Beth Gallagher	Kristin Davis
Joan Rogerson	Jane How
Jimmy	Alex Lowe
Ellen Gallagher	Holly J Barrett, Amelia Crouch, Lois Ellington & Sophia Pettit
