= James Dearden =

British screenwriter and director

- Born: 14 September 1949 (age 76); London, England
- Occupations: Screenwriter, director
- Years active: 1967–present
- Spouses: Jenny Dearden (m. 1974–1991) Annabel Brooks: (m. 199?)
- Parent(s): Basil Dearden; Melissa Stribling

James Dearden (born 14 September 1949) is a British screenwriter and film director, the son of actress Melissa Stribling and director Basil Dearden. He directed eight films between 1977 and 2018. His film Pascali's Island was entered into the 1988 Cannes Film Festival.

For writing the screenplay for Fatal Attraction (1987), Dearden received a nomination for the Academy Award for Best Adapted Screenplay.

Dearden is married to British actress Annabel Brooks.

== Filmography as writer and director ==
- The Contraption (1977)
- Panic (1978)
- Diversion (1980)
- The Cold Room (1984)
- Pascali's Island (1988)
- A Kiss Before Dying (1991)
- Rogue Trader (1999)
- Surviving Christmas with the Relatives (2018)

== Filmography as writer only ==
- Moviemakers (1971, uncredited)
- Fatal Attraction (1987) (screenplay, based on Diversion; directed by Adrian Lyne)
- Belle du Seigneur (2012) (co-writer of screenplay)
- Fatal Attraction (2023) (TV series, based on Fatal Attraction; co-writer of episodes 1–2, 5)

== Stage ==
- Fatal Attraction (2014)
