= The Palace =

UK television series

- Genre: Drama
- Created by: Tom Grieves
- Directed by: Metin Hüseyin; Maurice Phillips
- Starring: Rupert Evans; Jane Asher; Zoe Telford; Roy Marsden; Lorcan Cranitch; Sophie Winkleman; David Harewood; Sebastian Armesto
- Composers: Richard Chester; Joby Talbot
- Country of origin: United Kingdom
- Original language: English
- No. of series: 1
- No. of episodes: 8

Production
- Executive producers: George Faber; Charles Pattinson; Tom Grieves
- Producer: Gina Cronk
- Editors: Annie Kocur; Beverley Mills
- Running time: 45 minutes
- Production company: Company Pictures

Original release
- Network: ITV
- Release: 14 January – 3 March 2008

The Palace is a British drama television series that aired on ITV in 2008. Produced by Company Pictures for the ITV network, it was created by Tom Grieves and follows a fictional British royal family in the aftermath of the death of King James III and the succession of his 24-year-old son, King Richard IV, played by Rupert Evans. It also stars Jane Asher and Zoe Telford. The series was filmed in Lithuania in 2007 and broadcast from 14 January to 3 March 2008. Low viewing figures cancelled it after one series.

== Plot ==
On the sudden death of King James III, his 24-year-old elder son inherits the throne and becomes Richard IV. Princess Eleanor (Sophie Winkleman), his older sister, wants the throne for herself and resents that it goes to Richard. Her Private Secretary, Major Simon Brooks (David Harewood), helps her try to discredit the new king. Richard's younger brother, Prince George (Sebastian Armesto), is a party-animal, and the youngest sister, Princess Isabelle (Nathalie Lunghi), is an A-Level student. Their mother is the now-widowed Queen Charlotte (Jane Asher).

Abigail Thomas (Zoe Telford) is Richard's secretary who plans to write a tell-all book about her life in the Palace. Richard's Private Secretary is Sir Iain Ratalick (Roy Marsden). Other staff featured in the series are Abigail's personal assistant Lucy Bedford (Fiona Button) and the Press Secretary Jonty Roberts (Lorcan Cranitch).

== Cast ==
- Rupert Evans as King Richard IV
- Jane Asher as Queen Charlotte
- Sophie Winkleman as Princess Eleanor
- Sebastian Armesto as Prince George
- Nathalie Lunghi as Princess Isabelle
- Roy Marsden as Sir Iain Ratalick
- Zoe Telford as Abigail Thomas
- David Harewood as Major Simon Brooks
- Lorcan Cranitch as Jonty Roberts
- Hugh Ross as Jeremy Robinson
- John Ramm as Chief Superintendent Peter Bayfield
- Fiona Button as Lucy Bedford
- Shelley Conn as Miranda Hill
- John Shrapnel as PM Edward Shaw
- Christine Bottomley as Natalie
- Clemency Burton-Hill as The Hon. Alice Templeton
- Anton Lesser as Archbishop of Canterbury
- John Benfield as Ray Mellor
- Laura Haddock as Lady Arabella Worthesley Wolsey
- Dominic Jephcott as Dr Philip Hooper
- Frank Mills as Jack 'Dobbsy' Dobbs
- James Thornton as Milton Bishop
- Harriet Walter as Joanna Woodward
- Huw Rhys as David Waverley
- Owain Arthur as Jimmy Clacy
- Kate O'Flynn as Ruby Riley
- Russell Bright as Neil Haslam
- Heather Tobias as Anne Featherstone
- Amit Shah as Kulvinder 'Vinny' Ganatra
- Valentinas Klimas as King James III

== Episodes ==
The Palace aired on Mondays at 9 p.m. Each episode is about 45 minutes long and originally aired in a 60-minute slot with adverts. The broadcasts were sponsored by Warner Leisure Hotels, both on television and on itv.com. International broadcast sales were handled by All3Media, Company Pictures' parent company.

No.	Title	Directed by	Written by	Original release date	U.K. viewers (millions)
1	"Episode 1"	Metin Hüseyin	Tom Grieves	14 January 2008	4.59
Richard, Prince of Wales and Prince George are out clubbing when their father, King James III, dies suddenly while at the opera. Richard then succeeds to the throne as Richard IV, and within hours has met the Prime Minister Edward Shaw (John Shrapnel). Richard's older sister, Princess Eleanor, is immediately jealous of his new position as she believes she should be Queen, and she and her private secretary, Major Simon Brooks, start plotting to discredit Richard. Abi speaks to a publisher about doing a tell-all book. Meanwhile, footman Jimmy sees the King kissing a woman in the Throne Room, and The Sun threatens to break the story after James III's funeral. Before this happens, the King does a live television interview with Joanna Woodward (Harriet Walter), speaking candidly about his feelings of inadequacy and his love for his country.
2	"Episode 2"	Metin Hüseyin	Chris Lang	21 January 2008	^{[a]}
The King is having an affair with Miranda Hill (Shelley Conn), the Prime Minister's married press officer. Their relationship soon ends when her office leaks old drunken photos of him after the King argues with the Prime Minister over defense cuts. Richard enrages him by appearing to criticize the cuts and invites a recent war-widow to tea. Meanwhile, Prince George admits to the Palace's Chief Superintendent Peter Bayfield (John Ramm) that he hit a man while driving at night and did not stop to see if the man was all right. The Palace then tries to cover this up with only a handful of people knowing, but Princess Eleanor manages to find out from the security officer who was with Prince George at the time. Eleanor then tells Richard and encourages him to cover it up so she can leak it later to make them both look bad.
3	"Episode 3"	Metin Hüseyin	Tom Grieves	28 January 2008	^{[a]}
The King's relationship with Miranda Hill continues despite (at first) Miranda's reluctance to do so. The relationship between Abigail and Simon begins to flourish, although Abigail has no idea that his motive lies in the fact that Princess Eleanor is determined to find out her brother's mystery lover. After some persuasion, the King forces Prince George to confess to the accident and visit the victim; after the hospital visit, it is evident that the brothers' bond is broken. On discovering the identity of the mystery lover, Abigail hints to King Richard that she knows, so he visits her in her flat and she assures him she will tell no-one, but as he leaves the building he's photographed by the press.
4	"Episode 4"	Metin Hüseyin	Tom Grieves	4 February 2008	^{[a]}
Abigail is now the centre of attention with her picture splashed all over the newspapers after cameras caught the King leaving her apartment. Sir Iain grows even more suspicious of her by asking himself why was the King there in the first place. However, Princess Eleanor's aide, Simon, figures the real identity of the King's lover, Miranda, and goes straight to inform the Princess who in turn informs the Sunday papers. The Prime Minister and Sir Iain rush to the King's assistance and come up with a cover story: They will tell the world that Abigail is the real lover and keep Miranda's identity a secret. However, the King rejects this plan and ends his relationship with Miranda.
5	"Episode 5"	Maurice Phillips	Charlotte Jones	11 February 2008	3.31
To cause trouble, Princess Eleanor encourages her mother to wear a sentimental diamond necklace that was taken by the British in the days of the Raj. The Indian government now want it back; when Charlotte wears it during the Indian President's state visit, a diplomatic incident occurs. Richard wants to give it back, but worries about taking it away from his mother due to its sentimental value. Eventually, the Queen gives the necklace to the Indians herself. Meanwhile, she invites the Honourable Alice Templeton (Clemency Burton-Hill), Richard's childhood friend, to the Palace, hoping they will fall in love and marry, but he ends up kissing Abi while the two are talking. Also, the new head chef proves unpopular with the rest of the staff.
6	"Episode 6"	Maurice Phillips	Tom Grieves	18 February 2008	3.20
After an intruder breaks into Princess Eleanor's bedroom, she and her office move from Clarence House to Buckingham Palace. Simon then moves into Abi's office and discovers that she is the palace servant writing a "tell all" book. While putting on a brave front, Eleanor secretly is deeply disturbed by the intruder, especially after he kills himself because she didn't return his love for her. Meanwhile, Abi offers her resignation to the King after their kiss; he refuses it and says they should continue as before. Alice tells Abi that she loves Richard and the public reaction to her friendship with the King is very positive. At the gay wedding of one of the Palace servants, Alice kisses Richard, who says he does not love her, and Alice believes that Richard and Abi love each other.
7	"Episode 7"	Maurice Phillips	Chris Lang	25 February 2008	^{[a]}
Richard tells Abi that he loves her, but they're interrupted as they start to kiss. At her 18th birthday party, Princess Isabelle gives a speech damning the Monarchy and calling for a republic; filmed by a friend, the speech ends up on the Internet. Isabelle then disappears and after a few days the Palace questions her mental health. She responds by doing an interview with the News of the World. Soon after the Palace track her down and the family doctor diagnoses Acute Anxiety Syndrome (AAS). After being persuaded by Richard, Isabelle agrees to get treatment at a hospital. Meanwhile, Simon shows Princess Eleanor Abi's manuscript, and Eleanor tells Abi that she will show it to the King unless she tells her all of Richard’s secrets.
8	"Episode 8"	Maurice Phillips	Tom Grieves	3 March 2008	3.46
Princess Eleanor tells the Archbishop of Canterbury, who will be crowning the King, that Queen Charlotte had an affair 25 years ago, which might question Richard’s paternity. The priest then informs Sir Iain, and soon the entire Palace knows. Charlotte confesses to Richard that she did have an affair, but knows that he is legitimate. Meanwhile, Abi continues to be threatened by Eleanor and Simon, so confesses to Richard about the book and tells him about Eleanor’s plans to become Queen. He then has an argument with Eleanor, and when a DNA test proves that he is the rightful king, he says that after his Coronation he will send her to a remote island for six months to "recover" from her illness. Eleanor then sacks Major Brooks. After the Coronation, Richard and Abi, who has given back the advance for the book, tell each other they still love each other and she persuades him to give their relationship a go.

== Production ==
Tom Grieves' initial pitch centred on "a woman operating within the shadow of power". Ideas for the "power" included the Prime Minister, Sir Mick Jagger, and Rupert Murdoch before he settled on a fictional royal family. The relationship between the woman and the royal family was modelled on that seen in The West Wing between Jed Bartlet and his staff; Grieves desired to mimic The West Wing's "talky, aspirational, sophisticated" style in his own series. The earliest summaries of the plot placed the focus of the series on a woman who is working undercover at Buckingham Palace with the intent of writing an exposé of the King's life. The woman (later named "Abigail") "goes native" and cancels her book because she falls for the King.

The series was written by Grieves, Chris Lang, Charlotte Jones, and Toby Whitehouse. Grieves was influenced in his writing by Hamlet; he explored how Richard deals with the "ancient, ritualistic institution" that he inherits after James dies. The writers deliberately avoided making comparisons to the real royal family, despite the links made by media between Richard and George to Princes William and Harry. Patrick Jephson, the former private secretary to Diana, Princess of Wales, was consulted extensively during production, working with the writing team for over a year. The series was greenlit by ITV in January 2007.

Sets were designed by Taff Batley. Batley scouted production locations in Hungary, due to the expense a production the size of The Palace would have if filmed in the UK. A site was eventually found near the dock in Vilnius, Lithuania. Exterior sets of Buckingham Palace were scaled down from their true counterparts because of the length of time full-sized replicas would take to create; the scale sets alone took ten weeks to build. Red gravel for the palace courtyard was mimicked using clay that was bound for a new tennis court under construction nearby. Interior sets were built in an ice skating rink on the other side of the city. They used plasterboard instead of the lighter, cheaper plywood that would have been used on a British-based set. Batley referred to documentary footage to find a basis for his designs of bedrooms and other private areas of the palace that would otherwise not be available for public viewing. The first block of four episodes was directed by Metin Hüseyin and the second by Maurice Phillips.

== Reception ==
Prior to the broadcast of the series the pressure group Mediawatch UK called it "tawdry and offensive", suggesting that viewers would confuse the scripted television characters with the real British royal family. Lord St John of Fawsley called it "very near to the bone" and Penny Junor, the biographer of Charles, Prince of Wales, suggested ITV is exploiting the royal family by presenting fiction as fact. The Guardian previewed it as one of the top 50 shows (including film, theatre and television) to watch over the Christmas period.

After the first episode aired, Nancy Banks-Smith said in The Guardian that The Palace "is the TV equivalent of balloon modelling. It feels like being shot to death with popcorn." She also said that "I never fail to be amazed when decent actors - Walter, Marsden, Cranitch, Shrapnel - bob up in tosh like this." Andrew Billen said in The Times "I am delighted that, as with The Palace, the channel is setting before us something other than a grim regional detective or a comedy drama about suburban adultery. The Palace inhabits an incredible world all of its own. In that respect it is believable: the real palace undoubtedly does, too." James Walton for The Daily Telegraph wrote that for "sheer weirdness" there "was no match at all for The Palace". Keith Watson wrote in the Metro said that The Palace "pitched itself just right, its tongue-in-cheek study of a faction-riven upstairs clan contrasting with the bitching and backbiting of the downstairs footmen." He concluded his review by saying "Much of The Palace may be playing for laughs but it promises a sting in its blue-blooded tale".

The day after the series ended, Watson wrote "I know I'm in a minority here, but I shall miss the Dynasty-style antics of King Rich and his nemesis Princess Eleanor, with Rupert Evans and Sophie Winkleman top hole as scheming royal siblings." Rupert Evans played a very convincing, young King, with all the right flares. Watson called the series a victim of "ITV1’s ratings-crazy drama cull", referring to its impending cancellation.

In April 2008, ITV announced that The Palace would not be renewed for a second series, due to low viewing figures. The last episode had been watched by 3.1 million people.

== DVD release ==
The Palace was released on DVD in the UK (Region 2) on 17 March 2008.

== Notes ==
Ratings for these episodes fell below the Top 30 most-viewed programmes; BARB does not publicly release these figures.
