= Mr. Smith (film) =

1976 film by Adrian Lyne

- Directed by: Adrian Lyne
- Written by: Adrian Lyne
- Produced by: Gower Frost
- Cinematography: Terry Bedford
- Edited by: David Garland
- Production companies: Jennie & Co.
- Release date: 1976
- Running time: 38 minutes
- Country: United Kingdom
- Language: English

Mr. Smith is a 1976 short film written and directed by Adrian Lyne and starring Peter Barkworth. It was often shown as a 'filler' in London's West End cinemas along with horror or soft porn films such as Emmanuelle. It was Lyne's second short film, following The Table (1973), and was well received at the London Film Festival.

== Story ==
The film traces a day in the life of middle-aged Mr. Smith (Barkworth), which ends with his suicide.

== Cast ==
- Peter Barkworth
- Annette Crosbie
- Victoria Burgoyne
- Graham Ashley
- Myrtle Devenish
- Ingrid Hafner
- Carole Hayman
- Steve James
- Alan Lawrance
- Gerald McAllister
- Stella Tanner
