= The Table (1973 film) =

1973 film by Adrian Lyne

- Directed by: Adrian Lyne
- Written by: Adrian Lyne; Michael Hayes
- Produced by: Michael Hayes
- Starring: Derek O'Conor; Kate Williams
- Cinematography: Michael Seresin
- Edited by: Stephen Tobin
- Production company: Harpoon Pictures.
- Release date: 1973
- Running time: 10 minutes
- Country: United Kingdom
- Language: English

The Table is a 1973 short film directed by Adrian Lyne from a screenplay he co-wrote with Michael Hayes, the film's producer. It stars Derek O'Conor and Kate Williams. It was Lyne's first short film and was an official entry at the London Film Festival. The film also featured the director's son Louis Lyne as a small boy. The film was broadcast on British television in 1972 as part of Aquarius, and again in 1987.

== Premise ==
A couple argue at the breakfast table, as seen from the table's point-of-view.

== Cast ==
- Derek O'Conor
- Kate Williams
- Louis Lyne

== Reception ==
The "10-minute short, was less noticeable for its subject matter—an argument between a man and a woman at breakfast—than for its striking visuals: Lyne shot the film in extreme close-ups, so 'you never saw the people, just their eyes and mouths and their hands stirring coffee'", recalled The Washington Post in 1993.
