= Myrtle Devenish =

Film actor (1913–2007)

- Born: Myrtle Williams; 29 July 1912; Ebbw Vale, Wales
- Died: 21 January 2007 (aged 94); Paignton, Devon, England, UK
- Occupation: Actress

Myrtle Devenish (29 July 1912 – 21 January 2007) was a British film actress. She appeared in Worzel Gummidge, the 1980's drama Together, Terry Gilliam's cult films Time Bandits and Brazil, and in a 1988 episode of Crimewatch.

Devenish was born in Ebbw Vale, Wales.

== Filmography ==
Year	Title	Role	Ref
1976	Mr Smith	Anon	
1978	The Professionals	Old lady	
1981	Time Bandits	Beryl	
1983	The Crimson Permanent Assurance	Tea Lady	
1983	Runners	The Hotel - Lady on Telephone	
1984	Ever Decreasing Circles	Old Lady	
1985	Brazil	Typist in Jack's Office	
1986	L'étincelle	Grany	
1988	The Hound of the Baskervilles	Postmistress	
