= Jabberwocky (1977 film) =

1977 British film by Terry Gilliam

- Theatrical re-release poster
- Directed by: Terry Gilliam
- Screenplay by: Charles Alverson; Terry Gilliam
- Based on: "Jabberwocky" by Lewis Carroll
- Produced by: Sandy Lieberson
- Starring: Michael Palin; Harry H. Corbett; John Le Mesurier; Warren Mitchell; Max Wall; Rodney Bewes; John Bird; Bernard Bresslaw; Terry Gilliam; Neil Innes; Terry Jones
- Cinematography: Terry Bedford
- Edited by: Michael Bradsell
- Music by: Modest Mussorgsky; Hector Berlioz; Nikolai Rimsky-Korsakov; Jacques Ibert
- Production companies: Python Films; Umbrella Films
- Distributed by: Columbia-Warner Distributors
- Release dates: 28 March 1977 (Premiere); 31 March 1977 (London)
- Running time: 106 minutes
- Country: United Kingdom
- Language: English
- Budget: £587,668
- Box office: £479,219

Jabberwocky is a 1977 British fantasy comedy film directed by Terry Gilliam. Jabberwocky stars Michael Palin as Dennis, a cooper's apprentice, who is forced through clumsy, often slapstick misfortunes to hunt a terrible dragon after the death of his father. The film's title is taken from the nonsense poem "Jabberwocky" from Lewis Carroll's Through the Looking-Glass (1871).

Gilliam's solo directorial debut, following co-directing Monty Python and the Holy Grail with Terry Jones in 1975, the film received a mixed response from critics and audiences.

== Plot summary ==
In the depths of the Dark Ages, a carnivorous monster ravages the domains of King Bruno the Questionable. Life carries on as normal in isolated villages; in one of which, very innocent young Dennis Cooper pursues a career as a cooper in his ailing father's workshop. Mr. Cooper, senior, despises his son for valuing profit over craftsmanship, and when his illness becomes terminal, he publicly disinherits Dennis in an abuse-ridden deathbed speech. Dennis decides to travel to the kingdom's capital city, establish a new career, and then return to marry his love, a local woman named Griselda Fishfinger who doesn't reciprocate his affection. While trying to say goodbye to an inattentive Griselda, she throws away a rotten potato which Dennis catches and keeps as a cherished memento.

King Bruno's city is full of terrified refugees from villages destroyed by the monster. The only people pleased with the situation are a cabal of rich merchants selling overpriced goods to the refugees. None of the overburdened local craftsmen will listen to Dennis' suggestions for "improving efficiency", and he struggles to find work or food. Meanwhile, the king has decided to send a knight against the monster, and organizes a jousting tournament to find the best warrior for the job. If successful, the knight will be promoted to prince and married to the Princess, who lives in a tower, wishing a true prince will arrive and marry her.

A man named Ethel, squire to the Knight of the Red Herring, befriends Dennis and gives him a meal. Misunderstandings ensue and Dennis finds himself fleeing from a tavern keeper whose wife Ethel seduced. He seeks refuge in the tower, where the Princess, in a great feat of wishful thinking, takes him for an adventuring prince disguised as a peasant, and takes the potato, thinking he has brought it as a love token for her. Dennis is too bewildered to explain the truth, but he does convey that he already has a lover and the Princess sorrowfully lets him go. She lends him a nun's habit to use as a disguise, which leads to a run-in with a group of religious fanatics who believe he is Satan in the guise of a nun (or possibly a nun in the guise of Satan).

The joust grows increasingly bloody, and Passelewe, King Bruno's chamberlain, worries that all the knights will end up killed or incapacitated. He convinces the king to call off the fighting and instead pick a champion based on the outcome of a game of hide and seek. Red Herring emerges victorious. Ethel wants to stay in the city and pursue his affair with the tavern keeper's wife, so he bullies Dennis into taking his place as squire. The huge and dimwitted knight appears never to notice.

In order to continue profiting from the crisis the city merchants hire another warrior, the Black Knight, who rides to the monster's lair and assassinates Red Herring. He is about to kill Dennis as well, but the monster appears—a horrific, dragon-like biped—and the Black Knight is compelled to fight for his own life. After a titanic struggle, he appears to slay the monster, but it revives and knocks him off a cliff. Dennis accidentally slays it when it impales itself on a sword he was holding while cowering, and then cuts off the monster's head, brings it to the king, and is credited for the exploit. Griselda is more interested in Dennis now that he is a hero, but he never gets the chance to marry her. King Bruno the Questionable keeps his word, and Dennis is given half the kingdom, married to the Princess, and swept off to his honeymoon and an uncertain fate.

== Cast ==
- Michael Palin as Dennis Cooper
- Harry H. Corbett as The Squire (Ethel)
- John Le Mesurier as Passelewe
- Warren Mitchell as Mr. Fishfinger
- Annette Badland as Griselda Fishfinger
- Max Wall as King Bruno the Questionable / Voice of Red Herring
- Deborah Fallender as The Princess
- Jerold Wells as Wat Dabney
- Bernard Bresslaw as The Landlord
- Rodney Bewes as The Other Squire
- John Bird as 1st Herald
- Neil Innes as 2nd Herald
- Peter Cellier as 1st Merchant
- Frank Williams as 2nd Merchant
- Terry Jones as Poacher
- Brian Glover as Armourer
- Graham Crowden as Fanatics' Leader
- Bryan Pringle as Guard at the Gate
- Harold Goodwin as 1st Peasant
- John Gorman as 2nd Peasant
- Kenneth Colley as 1st Fanatic
- Gorden Kaye as Sister Jessica
- Derrick O'Connor as Flying Hogfish Peasant
- Terry Gilliam as Man with Rock
- David Prowse as Red Herring and Black Knights
- Reg Lye as Hawker

== Production ==
The film is close in setting and comic style to Monty Python and the Holy Grail, which Gilliam had co-directed. In addition to Palin, Python Terry Jones and Python contributor Neil Innes appear in Jabberwocky, giving it a Python-esque feel, with many scenes (such as the "hide and seek" jousting tournament) reminiscent of Holy Grail. The film was released as Monty Python's Jabberwocky in North America, despite protests from Gilliam.

=== Filming locations ===
The film was shot at Shepperton Studios, and on location at Pembroke Castle, Chepstow Castle, and Bosherston Quarry, all in Wales.

=== Monster ===
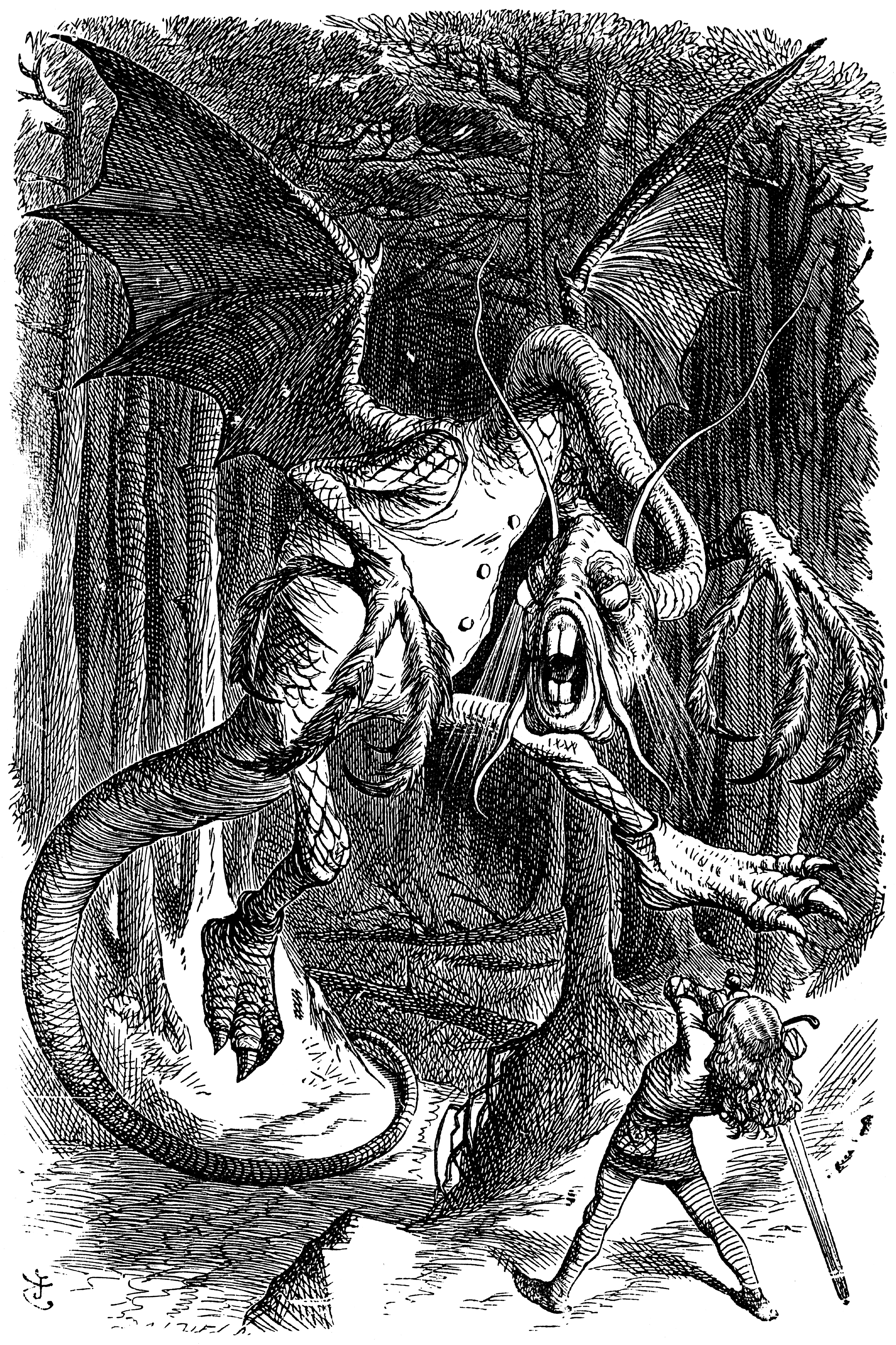
The Jabberwock, as illustrated by John Tenniel for Lewis Carroll's Through the Looking-Glass, which includes the poem "Jabberwocky".

The Jabberwock is a man in costume similar to the classic Japanese Godzilla film effects. To recreate the illustrated monster of the 19th century storybook, the costume is designed to be worn by a man walking backwards. Hip and knee joints are reversed giving it a bird-like gait. The actor's head is hidden within the monster's torso – the large marionette head on a serpentine neck is controlled by an offscreen pole and lines, which are visible on the print. Long bird-like claws extend out of his shoe heels and his arms become the Jabberwock's wings. Film speed is altered in some scenes to slow the monster's movements and camera angles manipulate perspective in scenes with live actors to depict the monster's immense size. Director Terry Gilliam, during the DVD commentary, stated that the Jabberwock's 'Death Fall' came about accidentally when the actor tripped during filming but because the fall was so natural it was used in the final print.

== Release ==
The film was previewed on 28 March 1977 in London followed by an event at the London Dungeon. It opened to the public on 31 March at the Columbia on Shaftesbury Avenue and the Odeon Kensington in London.

== Themes ==
=== Commerce ===
One of the most noticeable themes in the film is that of commerce. Dennis Cooper is unable to continue his work as a cooper after being gleefully disowned by his dying father. Despite Cooper having good ideas about raising productivity, the merchants and businessmen he meets are unwilling to listen to him. He moves from his village to the enclosed town in search of business opportunity. Dennis discovers that the craft guilds and merchants control business and that outsiders are struggling to survive. While in the city he discovers Wat Dabney, a legendary cooper and inventor of the "inverted firkin". Despite his skill, Wat is excluded by the guilds and has cut his foot off in an attempt to become a beggar – an act so successful that he ends up cutting off his other foot by the film's end.

The top merchants in the town profit handsomely from fear of the Jabberwock and are reluctant to help the King end the crisis. The Bishop is happy that fear has led to increased donations to the church and increased attendances at mass and confession ("piety ain't never been higher!"). The Bishop is so unimpressed by the King's choice of a champion to slay the monster that he blesses the champion by simply flicking holy water at him with his index finger. The merchants conspire to send the "black knight" (portrayed by David Prowse ) to kill the king's champion (also played by David Prowse) and are aghast when Dennis comes back with the monster's head.

=== "Creaking bureaucracy" ===
King Bruno and Passelewe are rulers in a castle that is falling apart. Darkness, dust, cobwebs and fallen plaster lie everywhere. It is so dark that the town outside is refreshing in comparison. So entrenched are these two in their misrule that the only way the King can find an answer to the Jabberwock is to emulate the deeds of his great-great-great-great-great-grandfather (Max the Vainglorious) and hold a tournament to select a champion; a decision which works because Dennis manages to accompany the champion (Dennis chances to slay the Jabberwock after the champion is killed by the Black Knight).

The "creaking bureaucracy" also includes the inept behaviour of his herald, who is far more concerned with heralding than in the message he is communicating, a process which eventually prevents the King from speaking and ends with the herald losing his head.

=== Accidental and unconventional happiness ===
An important theme that Gilliam cited on the film's audio commentary is happiness. By the end of the film Dennis gets everything a fairy tale hero would want (recognition for killing the beast, the princess' hand in marriage and half of the kingdom) by accident. All Dennis wanted was to live a humdrum life, with an overweight peasant girl who didn't even like him.

== Reception ==
=== Critical response ===
Jabberwocky received a mixed response from critics. On Rotten Tomatoes, it holds a rating of 45%, based on 22 reviews, with an average rating of 5.8/10.

Vincent Canby of The New York Times wrote the film a positive review, describing it as "the most marvelously demented British comedy to come along since Monty Python and The Holy Grail, to which Jabberwocky is a sort of stepson." Variety gave the film a mixed review, praising the monster as "inspired dark imagination," but ultimately describing the film as "long on jabber but short on yocks." Gene Siskel of the Chicago Tribune gave the film a one-star negative review, calling it "a film suitable for those who like unfunny comedies" and added that "to link it to Lewis Carroll or to his poem is to insult both." He further commented, "Jabberwocky is being billed as made by the Monty Python comedy crew, with artwork that suggests it's a sequel to Monty Python and the Holy Grail. That's misleading on both counts. Only a couple of the Python gang (seen regularly on WTTW-Ch. 11) contributed to the script, and the result is a crude and totally unfunny picture. [...] When in doubt, the script resorts to jokes about urination, defecation, or dismemberment."
