= Fatal Attraction (2023 TV series) =

American thriller television series

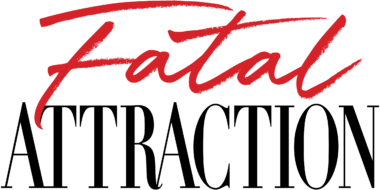
- Genre: Erotic thriller; Psychological thriller
- Based on: Fatal Attraction by James Dearden
- Developed by: Alexandra Cunningham; Kevin J. Hynes
- Starring: Joshua Jackson; Lizzy Caplan; Amanda Peet; Toby Huss; Brian Goodman; Alyssa Jirrels; Reno Wilson
- Composer: Craig DeLeon
- Country of origin: United States
- Original language: English
- No. of seasons: 1
- No. of episodes: 8

Production
- Executive producers: Alexandra Cunningham; Kevin J. Hynes; Silver Tree; Justin Falvey; Darryl Frank
- Producer: Jonathan Talbert
- Running time: 53–62 minutes
- Production companies: Nutmegger; Amblin Television; Paramount Television Studios

Original release
- Network: Paramount+
- Release: April 30 – May 28, 2023

Related
- Fatal Attraction

Fatal Attraction is an American erotic psychological thriller television series developed by Alexandra Cunningham and Kevin J. Hynes. It is based on the 1987 film of the same name written by James Dearden. The series aired on Paramount+ from April 30 to May 28, 2023. In October 2023, the series was cancelled after one season.

== Premise ==
A passionate affair takes a volatile and dangerous turn when a woman refuses to allow her married lover to put an end to it.

== Cast and characters ==
=== Main ===
- Joshua Jackson as Dan Gallagher, a Los Angeles deputy district attorney who serves as the head of the Major Crimes Bureau
- Lizzy Caplan as Alex Forrest, a newly hired member of the Victim Services Bureau
- Amanda Peet as Beth Gallagher, Dan's wife and Ellen's mother
- Toby Huss as Mike Gerard, the DA office's chief of investigations and Dan's close friend
- Brian Goodman as Arthur Tomlinson, Beth's best friend and business partner
- Alyssa Jirrels as Ellen Gallagher, Dan and Beth's daughter and a psychology student
  - Vivien Lyra Blair as young Ellen
- Reno Wilson as Detective Earl Booker, an LAPD officer

=== Recurring ===
- John Getz as Warren, Beth's father
- Jessica Harper as Sophie, Beth's mother
- Toks Olagundoye as Conchita Lewis, the head of the Victim Services Bureau, Alex's boss, and Dan's close friend
- Wanda De Jesus as Marcella Levya, a respected attorney and Dan's boss
- David Meunier as Richard Macksey, Ellen's psychology professor and thesis advisor
- Walter Perez as Jorge Perez, a deputy district attorney
- Tiago Roberts as Gabriel Ibarra, a courthouse bailiff
- David Sullivan as Frank Gallardo, Dan's Major Crimes co-worker
- Isabella Briggs as Stella, a student who befriends Ellen and is having a secret affair with Richard
- Holley Fain as Julia Tomlinson, Arthur's wife

=== Guest ===
- Terri Hoyos as Beatrice, a criminal defense attorney
- Christina Kirk as Angela, Ellen's therapist
- Dee Wallace as Emma Rauch, Alex's neighbor
- Cliff Chamberlain as Stanley Forrest, Alex's father
- Will Ropp as Elijah Acosta, a former delivery man who now works at a cannabis store
- Michelle Twarowska as Olena Kuzma, a woman in an abusive relationship whom Alex helps as part of Victim Services
- Josh Zuckerman as Paul, Alex's neighbor
- Vanessa Martinez as Jeannette Ruiz, an attorney in the Crimes Against Women Bureau
- Gary Perez as Rolando Cabral
- Michael Cassidy as Clay Bishop, a legal aid attorney who has a brief relationship with Alex
- Brynn Thayer as Ruth Gurian
- Lena Georgas as Patricia Forrest, Alex's mother
- Ivy George as young Alex
- Rondi Reed as Judge Webb
- Jessika Van as Michelle

== Episodes ==
No.	Title	Directed by	Teleplay by	Original release date
1	"Pilot"	Silver Tree	Alexandra Cunningham and James Dearden	April 30, 2023
2	"The Movie in Your Mind"	Silver Tree	Alexandra Cunningham and James Dearden	April 30, 2023
3	"The Watchful Heart"	Silver Tree	Stacy A. Littlejohn	April 30, 2023
4	"Beautiful Mosaics"	Alexandra Cunningham	Katherine B. McKenna	May 7, 2023
5	"Medial Woman"	Alexandra Cunningham	Kevin J. Hynes & Tandace Khorrami and James Dearden	May 14, 2023
6	"The Dillingers"	Silver Tree	Luke Groneman & Michael Cruz	May 21, 2023
7	"Best Friends"	Pete Chatmon	Kevin J. Hynes	May 28, 2023
8	"Caregiving"	Silver Tree	Alexandra Cunningham	May 28, 2023

== Production ==
A television series reboot of the film was first announced in February 2021, when Paramount Pictures had announced they would be producing television versions of their films, naming Fatal Attraction, Flashdance, The Italian Job, Love Story, and The Parallax View as in development for Paramount+.

In November, the series was officially given a series order, and Lizzy Caplan was cast to star as Alex, portrayed by Glenn Close in the film. In January 2022, Joshua Jackson was cast as Dan, portrayed by Michael Douglas in the film. In May, Silver Tree joined as a director and executive producer, with Amanda Peet, Alyssa Jirrels, Toby Huss, Reno Wilson, and Brian Goodman joining the cast in June. Wanda De Jesus would be added in a recurring role in July. Doreen Calderon, Jessica Harper, John Getz, Toks Olagundoye, David Sullivan, and Isabella Briggs would join the following month. In October, Walter Perez, David Meunier and Dee Wallace were cast in recurring roles.

Filming began in mid–2022.

On October 26, 2023, Paramount+ cancelled the series after one season.

== Release ==
Fatal Attraction aired on Paramount+ from April 30 to May 28, 2023. The series had its international premiere at the 2023 Canneseries on April 18.

== Reception ==
The review aggregator website Rotten Tomatoes reported a 37% approval rating with an average rating of 5.1/10, based on 51 critic reviews. The website's critics consensus reads, "While Fatal Attraction avoids being a mere copy by transposing the lurid classic into a modern era of sexual politics, clumsy execution ultimately dulls this story's edge." Metacritic, which uses a weighted average, assigned a score of 47 out of 100 based on 25 critics, indicating "mixed or average reviews".

The A.V. Club's Manuel Betancourt gave the series a C+ grade, writing, "Here's Fatal Attraction (1987) filtered through an at times painfully... self-reflective lens—as if the series were aware that its central setup (a murdered mistress) couldn't possibly be uncritically presented lest it be misread as the stuff of puerile thrillers." James Jackson of The Times gave it 2/5 stars, saying it "finds new things to say about these damaged lives yet is so immersed in their problems it's more a case of Fatal Protraction."

John Anderson of The Wall Street Journal called the series a "first-rate reimagining" an added that it was "far more complex, engrossing and adult than the 1987 original. And it shows that there was much more to be mined out of James Dearden's Oscar-nominated screenplay than Mr. Lyne probably ever imagined." TheWrap's Gwen Ihnat said the series was "Captivating, binge-worthy viewing, despite the fact the pacing can get clunky, stretched across eight episodes that probably could have been six".
