= Diversion (film) =

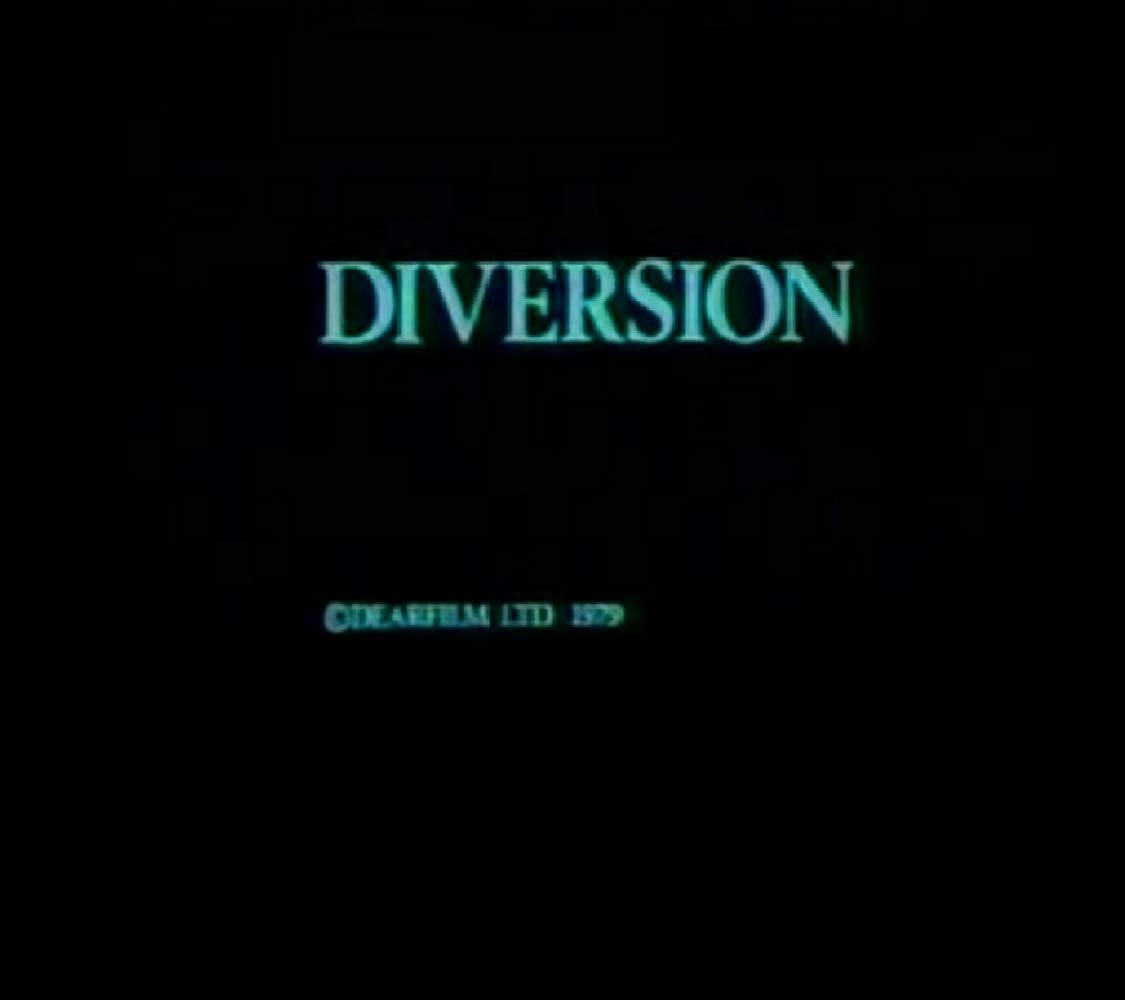
- Directed by: James Dearden
- Written by: James Dearden
- Produced by: Laurence Myers
- Starring: Stephen Moore; Cherie Lunghi; Morag Hood
- Edited by: Chris Wyatt
- Production company: Dearfilm
- Distributed by: GTO Films
- Release date: October 1980
- Running time: 47 minutes
- Country: United Kingdom
- Language: English

Diversion is a 1980 British film written and directed by James Dearden, who later adapted its screenplay into that of the American film Fatal Attraction (1987). It follows a married man (Stephen Moore) who has a one-night stand with a woman (Cherie Lunghi) while his wife (Morag Hood) is away, only for the woman to begin stalking him.

== Plot ==
A journalist named Guy asks a woman named Erica to dinner after meeting her at a party, during which time his wife Annie and son Charlie are away visiting Annie's family. Guy and Erica begin an affair and sleep with each other the same night, before Guy returns home the next morning. However, Erica begins to stalk him. He reluctantly spends the following day with her, and she cuts her wrists when he tries to leave. He helps her recover and leaves in the morning.

Annie and Charlie return home later that day, with Annie unaware of Guy's affair. While writing a report, Guy is called by Erica, who demands to see him. The two argue over the phone as Guy refuses to resume the affair, attracting Annie's attention. Guy lies about who was on the phone, and claims it is a wrong number when it rings again. The phone continues to ring and Annie curiously picks it up, with Guy nervously watching before the screen cuts to black.

== Cast ==
- Stephen Moore as Guy
- Cherie Lunghi as Erica
- Morag Hood as Annie
- Ned Vukovic as Waiter
- Dickon Horsey as Charlie
- Alice as Dog
