= Terry Bedford =

British cinematographer and film director

Terry Bedford (b 1943) was a British film director and cinematographer. He worked extensively as a cinematographer on British television commercials for directors such as Adrian Lyne (with whom he formed a company, Jennie and Co.) He was cameraman for Monty Python and the Holy Grail. His first feature as director was Slayground (1983).

== Select credits ==
- Monty Python and the Holy Grail (1975) - lighting camera
- Mr. Smith (1976) - cinematographer
- Jabberwocky (1977) - photographer
- Freedom of the Dig (1978) - director
- Slayground (1983) - director
- An American Story (1990) - director
