= Fatal Attraction =

1987 film by Adrian Lyne

- Theatrical release poster
- Directed by: Adrian Lyne
- Screenplay by: James Dearden
- Based on: Diversion by James Dearden
- Produced by: Stanley R. Jaffe; Sherry Lansing
- Starring: Michael Douglas; Glenn Close; Anne Archer
- Cinematography: Howard Atherton
- Edited by: Michael Kahn; Peter E. Berger
- Music by: Maurice Jarre
- Production company: Jaffe/Lansing Productions
- Distributed by: Paramount Pictures
- Release date: September 18, 1987 (United States)
- Running time: 119 minutes
- Country: United States
- Language: English
- Budget: $14 million
- Box office: $320–344 million

Fatal Attraction is a 1987 American erotic psychological thriller film directed by Adrian Lyne and written by James Dearden, based on his 1980 short film Diversion. It follows Dan Gallagher (Michael Douglas), a publishing attorney who cheats on his wife Beth (Anne Archer) with a colleague, Alex Forrest (Glenn Close). When Dan ends the affair, Alex begins stalking him and his family.

Fatal Attraction was released in the United States on September 18, 1987 by Paramount Pictures. It grossed between $320 million and $344 million worldwide on a $14 million production budget, and was the second highest-grossing film of the year in the United States. It received acclaim, with particular praise for its direction, editing, screenplay, and performances. It received six nominations at the 60th Academy Awards, including Best Picture, Best Director for Lyne, Best Adapted Screenplay for Dearden, Best Actress for Close, and Best Supporting Actress for Archer. Considered a pop culture phenomenon in the years since its release, the film is also credited for triggering the erotic thriller boom of the late 1980s to the mid-1990s.

A play based on the film opened in London's West End at the Theatre Royal Haymarket in 2014. In 2023, a television adaptation was broadcast on Paramount+.

== Plot ==
Dan Gallagher is a publishing attorney from Manhattan. While his wife, Beth, and daughter, Ellen, are away visiting Beth's family, he has an affair with Alex Forrest, an associate editor for a client who begins to cling to him. Dan reluctantly spends the following day with Alex, but when he ends their affair, she cuts her wrists. Dan helps her and leaves in the morning.

Alex comes to Dan's office to apologize, but he declines her invitation to a performance of Madame Butterfly, her favorite opera. She continues to call him at his office until he informs his secretary that he will no longer take her calls. Alex insists that Dan meet her and tells him she is pregnant, arguing that he must take responsibility. After Dan changes their phone number, Alex meets Beth, pretending to be interested in buying their apartment. That night, Dan goes to Alex's apartment to confront her and they get into a scuffle.

After the Gallaghers move to Bedford, New York, Alex sends a tape recording of herself delivered to him, which is full of verbal abuse. She stalks him, pours acid onto his car and follows him home that evening. The sight of his happy family through their window makes her vomit. Dan approaches the police to file a restraining order, claiming it is for a client. The lieutenant informs him that he cannot violate Alex's rights without probable cause, and that the client must own up to his adultery.

When the Gallaghers return home, they discover Alex has boiled Ellen's pet rabbit on their stove. Dan confesses the affair and Alex's pregnancy to Beth. Enraged, Beth orders him to leave. Dan calls Alex to say Beth knows about the affair. Beth takes the phone and tells Alex that she will kill her if Alex comes near their family again. Alex picks Ellen up from her school and kidnaps her, taking her to an amusement park. Beth drives around frantically looking for her and gets into an accident, requiring hospitalization. Alex returns Ellen home unharmed.

After visiting Beth in the hospital, Dan forcibly enters Alex's apartment and attempts to strangle her, but stops short of killing her. She grabs a kitchen knife and lunges at him, but he disarms her and leaves. The police search for Alex after Dan reports the kidnapping. Beth forgives Dan, and they return home after Beth is discharged from the hospital. While Beth prepares to take a bath, Alex emerges and attacks her with a knife. Dan rushes upstairs, subdues Alex and appears to drown her in the bathtub, but she emerges swinging the knife. Beth shoots her dead. Dan completes his statement to the police and joins Beth in the living room.

== Cast ==
- Michael Douglas as Dan Gallagher
- Glenn Close as Alex Forrest
- Anne Archer as Beth Rogerson Gallagher
- Ellen Hamilton Latzen as Ellen Gallagher
- Stuart Pankin as Jimmy
- Ellen Foley as Hildy
- Fred Gwynne as Arthur Hurst, Dan's boss
- Meg Mundy as Joan Rogerson
- Tom Brennan as Howard Rogerson
- Lois Smith as Martha, Dan's secretary
- Mike Nussbaum as Bob Drimmer
- J. J. Johnston as O'Rourke
- Michael Arkin as Lieutenant
- Jane Krakowski as Christine, the babysitter

== Production ==
=== Writing ===
The film was adapted by James Dearden (with assistance from Nicholas Meyer) from Dearden's 1980 short film Diversion. In Meyer's book The View from the Bridge: Memories of Star Trek and a Life in Hollywood, he explains that in late 1986 producer Stanley R. Jaffe asked him to look at the script developed by Dearden, and he wrote a four-page memo making suggestions, including a new ending. John Carpenter was approached to direct the film, but turned it down as he felt it was too similar to Play Misty for Me (1971). A few weeks later Meyer met with the director Adrian Lyne and gave him some additional suggestions. Meyer was asked to redraft the script to create the shooting script.

=== Casting ===
Producers Sherry Lansing and Stanley R. Jaffe both had serious doubts about casting Glenn Close because they did not think she could be sexual enough. Instead, they had many other actresses in mind. Barbara Hershey was originally considered; she wanted the role but she was unavailable. Several actresses auditioned for the part, but they were almost all turned down. Lyne had French actress Isabelle Adjani in mind for the role. Tracey Ullman was approached for the role, but she declined due to a scene in the script where the character boils a bunny, as did Olivia Hussey. Miranda Richardson also turned it down as she found it "hideous." Ellen Barkin, Debra Winger, Susan Sarandon, Jessica Lange, Judy Davis, Melanie Griffith and Michelle Pfeiffer were also considered for the role. Kirstie Alley auditioned for the role. Close was persistent, and after meeting with Jaffe several times in New York, she was asked to fly out to Los Angeles to read with Michael Douglas in front of Adrian Lyne and Lansing. Before the audition, she let her naturally frizzy hair "go wild" because she was impatient at putting it up, and she wore a slimming black dress she thought made her look "fabulous" to the audition. This impressed Lansing, because Close "came in looking completely different... right away she was into the part." Close and Douglas performed a scene from early in the script, where Alex flirts with Dan in a café, and Close came away "convinced my career was over, that I was finished, I had completely blown my chances". Lansing and Lyne were both convinced she was right for the role; Lyne stated that "an extraordinary erotic transformation took place. She was this tragic, bewildering mix of sexuality and rage—I watched Alex come to life."

To prepare for her role, Close consulted several psychologists, hoping to understand Alex's psyche and motivations. She was uncomfortable with the bunny boiling scene, which she thought was too extreme, but she was assured on consulting the psychologists that such an action was entirely possible and that Alex's behavior corresponded to someone who had experienced incestual sexual abuse as a child. While filming her death scene, Close suffered a concussion and was hospitalized. She later found out that she was pregnant during filming.

=== Alternate ending ===
Alex was originally scripted slashing her throat at the film's end with the knife Dan had left on the counter, so as to make it appear that Dan had murdered her. After seeing her husband being taken away by police, Beth finds a revealing cassette tape that Alex sent Dan in which she threatens to kill herself. Beth takes the tape to the police, who clear Dan of the murder. The last scene shows, in flashback, Alex taking her own life by slashing her throat while listening to Madame Butterfly.

When the film was test-screened for audiences, the ending was poorly received as audiences disliked the idea of Alex triumphing in the end. Joseph Farrell, who handled the test screenings, suggested that Paramount shoot a new ending. While Douglas approved of changing the ending as he believed it was "best for the film", most of the cast and crew disliked the idea. Archer was "appalled" by the change and burst into tears when she heard the news. Close had doubts, believing Alex would "self-destruct and commit suicide". Lyne initially refused to change the ending until Lansing offered him an additional $1.5 million salary, while Dearden reluctantly agreed to write the new ending believing the film would be a bigger hit if changed.

Close fought against the change for two weeks before eventually giving in on her concerns and filming the new sequence after William Hurt convinced her to do it. Though the ending was not the one she preferred, she acknowledged that the film would not have been as successful without it, because it gave the audience "a sense of catharsis, a hope, that somehow the family unit would survive the nightmare".

While Lyne has stood by the revised ending believing it was a "good idea", Dearden and Close have continued to express their displeasure. In 2010, during a cast reunion interview, Close shared that she "never thought of [her character] as a villain" and said: "I wasn't playing a generality. I wasn't playing a cliché. I was playing a very specific, deeply disturbed, fragile human being, whom I had grown to love." Close also stated that she doesn't think the film would have been a hit without the "new" ending. In 2014, Dearden penned a piece for The Guardian stating that while he does not regret writing the story, he does express his regret for the theatrical ending believing it to be sexist and the way Alex was portrayed in it stating that he didn't want to make her a monster but rather "a sad, tragic, lonely woman, holding down a tough job in an unforgiving city." When adapting his script to the stage, he opted to lean away from making her a villain and made her a more tragic figure.

== Release ==
Fatal Attraction was released in the United States on September 18, 1987 by Paramount Pictures.

On September 24, 1988, it was the first film to be directly distributed by a US company in South Korea (by United International Pictures). The film was sold on a royalty basis. Korean film directors, producers and distributors protested this change as they were concerned that UIP wanted to remit all the ticket sale revenue to the US which would have a negative impact on the manufacture and promotion of Korean motion pictures. Protesters threatened to release snakes in the theatres, setting fire in the theatres, and tearing off the screens.

The version with the alternate, original, ending was released in three theaters in Tokyo, Japan in October 1988, eight months after the release of the earlier version. The alternate ending version was two minutes shorter.

=== Home media ===
A special edition VHS and LaserDisc released by Paramount in 1992 featured the alternate, original, ending.

A Special Collector's Edition of the film was released on DVD in 2002, also with the original ending. Paramount released Fatal Attraction on Blu-ray Disc on June 9, 2009. The Blu-ray contained several bonus features from the 2002 DVD, including commentary by director Adrian Lyne, cast and crew interviews, a look at the film's cultural phenomenon, a behind-the-scenes look, rehearsal footage, the alternative ending, and the original theatrical trailer. In April 2020 a remastered Blu-ray Disc was released by Paramount Home Entertainment under their Paramount Presents series. Included was a new interview with the director titled Filmmaker Focus, previous rehearsal footage but excluding some of the extra features from previous releases. Paramount released the film on 4K Ultra HD Blu-ray in the U.S. on September 13, 2022.

== Reception ==
=== Box office ===
Fatal Attraction grossed $156.6 million in the United States and Canada, and $163.5–187.3 million in other territories, for a worldwide total of $320–344 million.

The film spent eight weeks at number one in the United States, where it was the second-highest-grossing film of 1987, behind Three Men and a Baby. In the United Kingdom, it grossed a record £2,048,421 in its opening week and spent ten weeks at number one. In Australia, it was the first non-Australian film to gross A$2 million in its opening week, second to Crocodile Dundee. Fatal Attraction eventually became the highest-grossing film worldwide in 1987.

=== Nominations ===
Fatal Attraction received 6 nominations at the 60th Academy Awards, including Best Picture, Best Director (for Lyne), Best Actress (Close) and Best Supporting Actress (Archer), but failed to win any. At the 42nd British Academy Film Awards, the film won Best Editing, while earning nominations for Best Actor in a Leading Role (Douglas) and Best Actress in a Supporting Role (Archer). It also received four nominations at the 45th Golden Globe Awards, including Best Motion Picture – Drama, Best Director (Lyne), Best Actress in a Motion Picture – Drama (Close) and Best Supporting Actress – Motion Picture (Archer).

=== Critical response ===
On the review aggregator website Rotten Tomatoes, 74% of 61 critics' reviews are positive, with an average rating of 6.8/10. The website's consensus reads: "A potboiler in the finest sense, Fatal Attraction is a sultry, juicy thriller that's hard to look away from once it gets going." Metacritic, which uses a weighted average, assigned the film a score of 67 out of 100, based on 16 critics, indicating "generally favorable" reviews. Audiences polled by CinemaScore gave the film an average grade of "A" on an F to A+ scale.

Janet Maslin of The New York Times lauded Lyne's direction, writing that he "takes a brilliantly manipulative approach to what might have been a humdrum subject and shapes a soap opera of exceptional power. Most of that power comes directly from visual imagery, for Mr. Lyne is well versed in making anything – a person, a room, a pile of dishes in a kitchen sink – seem tactile, rich and sexy." Richard Schickel of Time stated that Close and Douglas "gives the film some of its fatal attractiveness. So do James Dearden's plausible, nicely observant script, Adrian Lyne's elegantly unforced direction, and Close's beautifully calibrated descent into lunacy. Together they bring horror home to a place where the grownup moviegoer actually lives."

Author Susan Faludi discussed the film in Backlash: The Undeclared War Against American Women, arguing that major changes had been made to the original plot in order to make Alex wholly negative, while Dan's carelessness and the lack of compassion and responsibility raised no discussion, except for a small number of men's groups who said that Dan was eventually forced to own up to his irresponsibility in that "everyone pays the piper". Close was quoted in 2008 as saying, "Men still come up to me and say, 'You scared the shit out of me.' Sometimes they say, 'You saved my marriage.'" Critic Barry Norman expressed sympathy for feminists who were frustrated by the film, criticized its "over-the-top" ending and called it inferior to Clint Eastwood's Play Misty for Me, which has a similar plot. Nonetheless, he declared it "strong and very well made, excellently played by the three main characters and neatly written." Fatal Attraction has been described as a neo-noir film by some authors.

Psychiatrists and film experts have analyzed the character of Alex Forrest and used her as an illustration of borderline personality disorder. She exhibits impulsive behavior, emotional instability, a fear of abandonment, frequent episodes of intense anger, self-harming, and shifting between idealization and devaluation of others, all of which are characteristic of the disorder. The degree to which she displays these traits is not necessarily typical, and aggression in people with borderline personality disorder is often directed toward themselves rather than others. Slant Magazine named her role one of the "15 Famous Movie Psychopaths", and WhatCulture included it in top "10 Most Convincing Movie Psychopath Performances"

As referenced in Orit Kamir's Every Breath You Take: Stalking Narratives and the Law, "Glenn Close's character Alex is quite deliberately made to be an erotomaniac." Gelder reports that Close "consulted three separate shrinks for an inner profile of her character, who is meant to be suffering from a form of an obsessive condition known as de Clérambault's syndrome" (Gelder 1990, 93–94). The term "bunny boiler" is used to describe an obsessive, spurned woman, deriving from the scene where it is discovered that Alex has boiled the family's pet rabbit. The sensational 2013 murder trial of Jodi Arias for the grisly killing of her ex-boyfriend in Mesa, Arizona, was widely dubbed a real-life "Fatal Attraction" due to the crime’s graphic nature and hypersexual, obsessive themes.

=== Accolades and honors ===
| Award | Category | Nominee(s) | Result | Ref. |
|---|---|---|---|---|
| Academy Awards | Best Picture | Stanley R. Jaffe and Sherry Lansing | Nominated | |
| Academy Awards | Best Director | Adrian Lyne | Nominated | |
| Academy Awards | Best Actress | Glenn Close | Nominated | |
| Academy Awards | Best Supporting Actress | Anne Archer | Nominated | |
| Academy Awards | Best Screenplay – Based on Material from Another Medium | James Dearden | Nominated | |
| Academy Awards | Best Film Editing | Michael Kahn and Peter E. Berger | Nominated | |
| American Cinema Editors Awards | Best Edited Feature Film | Michael Kahn and Peter E. Berger | Nominated | |
| Artios Awards | Outstanding Achievement in Feature Film Casting – Drama | Risa Bramon Garcia and Billy Hopkins | Nominated | |
| ASCAP Film and Television Music Awards | Top Box Office Films | Maurice Jarre | Won | |
| British Academy Film Awards | Best Actor in a Leading Role | Michael Douglas | Nominated | |
| British Academy Film Awards | Best Actress in a Supporting Role | Anne Archer | Nominated | |
| British Academy Film Awards | Best Editing | Michael Kahn and Peter E. Berger | Won | |
| David di Donatello Awards | Best Foreign Actor | Michael Douglas | Nominated | |
| David di Donatello Awards | Best Foreign Actress | Glenn Close | Nominated | |
| Directors Guild of America Awards | Outstanding Directorial Achievement in Motion Pictures | Adrian Lyne | Nominated | |
| DVD Exclusive Awards | Original Retrospective Documentary, Library Release | Jon Barbour | Nominated | |
| Golden Globe Awards | Best Motion Picture – Drama | | Nominated | |
| Golden Globe Awards | Best Actress in a Motion Picture – Drama | Glenn Close | Nominated | |
| Golden Globe Awards | Best Supporting Actress – Motion Picture | Anne Archer | Nominated | |
| Golden Globe Awards | Best Director – Motion Picture | Adrian Lyne | Nominated | |
| Goldene Kamera | Golden Screen | | Won | |
| Goldene Kamera | Best International Actor | Michael Douglas | Won | |
| Goldene Kamera | Best International Actress | Glenn Close | Won | |
| Grammy Awards | Best Album of Original Instrumental Background Score Written for a Motion Picture or Television | Maurice Jarre | Nominated | |
| Japan Academy Film Prize | Outstanding Foreign Language Film | | Nominated | |
| National Board of Review Awards | Top Ten Films | | | |
| People's Choice Awards | Favorite Dramatic Motion Picture | | Won | |
| Saturn Awards | Best Writing | James Dearden | Nominated | |
| Writers Guild of America Awards | Best Screenplay – Based on Material from Another Medium | James Dearden | Nominated | |

American Film Institute recognition

- AFI's 100 Years...100 Thrills—#28
- AFI's 100 Years...100 Heroes & Villains: Alex Forrest—Villain—#7

== Adaptations ==
A play based on the film opened in London's West End at the Theatre Royal Haymarket in March 2014. It was adapted by the film's original screenwriter James Dearden.

On July 2, 2015, Fox announced that a TV series based on the film was being developed by Mad Men writers Maria and Andre Jacquemetton. On January 13, 2017, it was announced that the project was canceled. On February 24, 2021, it was announced that Paramount+ planned to reboot the film as a series for their platform. It was by Alexandra Cunningham and Kevin J. Hynes and produced by Cunningham, Hynes, Justin Falvey and Darryl Frank of Amblin Entertainment, Stanley Jaffe, and Sherry Lansing. On November 11, Lizzy Caplan was announced to play Alex Forrest in the new series and Joshua Jackson joined in January 2022 as Dan Gallagher.

== See also ==
- Carolyn Warmus
- List of films featuring home invasions
- List of films featuring psychopaths and sociopaths
- Mental illness in film
- Basic Instinct, a 1992 film which also stars Douglas exploring similar themes
- Fatal Instinct, a 1993 film parody
