= Travel documentary =

Documentary film, television program or online series that describes travel

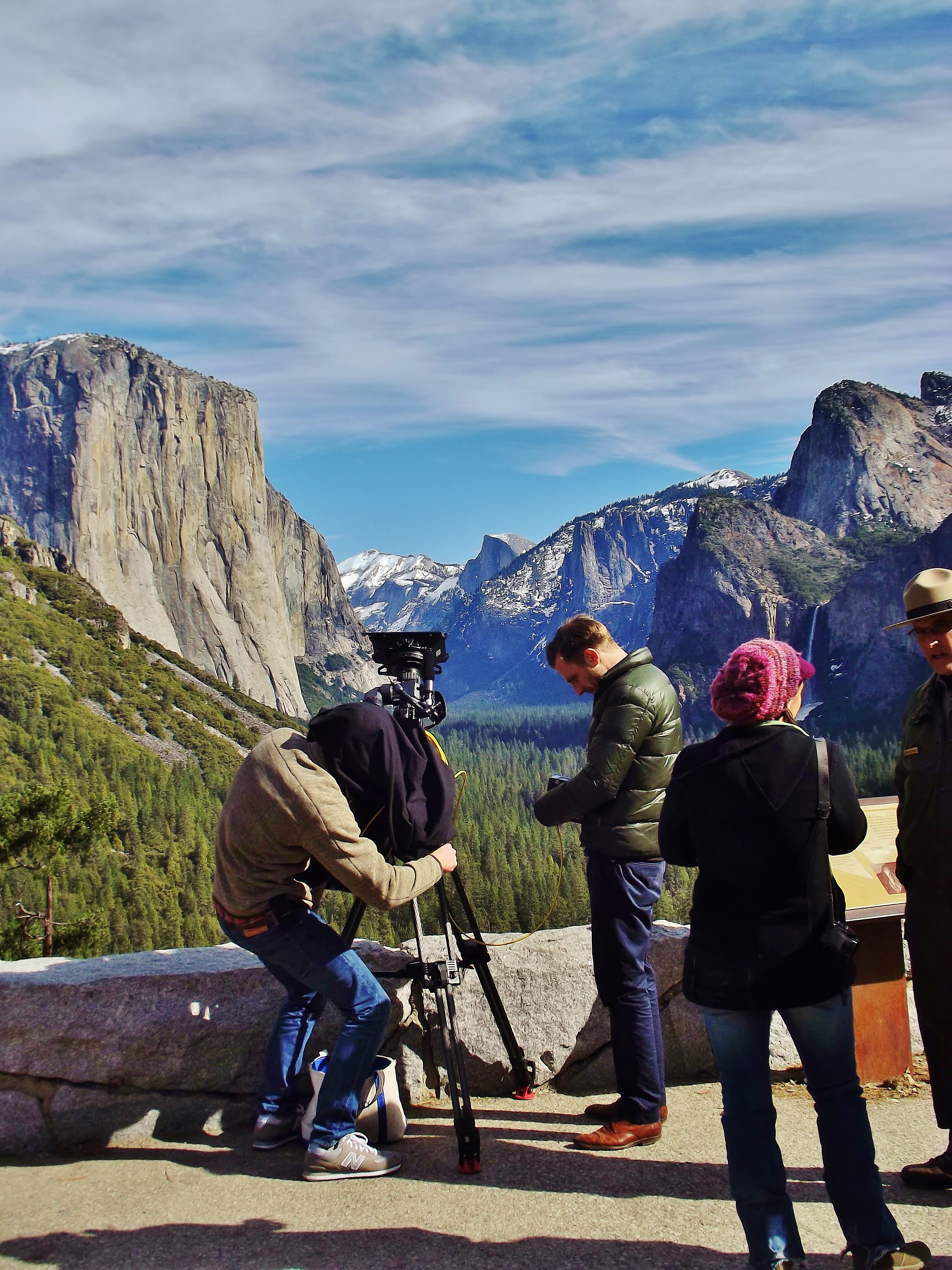
A travel channel filming the Yosemite Valley

A travel documentary is a documentary film, television program, or online series that describes travel or tourist attractions without endorsing specific commercial package deals or tour operators. A travelogue is an early iteration of this genre, often serving as an exploratory ethnographic film.

The genre has been represented by television shows such as Across the Seven Seas, which showcased travelogues produced by third parties, and by occasional itinerant presentations of travelogues in theaters and other venues.

The British comedian and actor Michael Palin has made several series in this genre beginning with Around the World in 80 Days (1989). PBS has several travel shows including those hosted by Rick Steves and Burt Wolf.

== History ==
=== Travelogues ===
Travelogues were used to provide the general public with a means of observing different countries and cultures since the late 19th century. Travelogues are considered to be a form of virtual tourism or travel documentary and were often presented as lectures narrating accompanying films and photos. A travelogue is based on the personal experience of someone travelling through a new landscape and in contexts of ethnographic films where it exists a protagonist which took the whole story along. Travelogues are defined as nonfiction films that use a place as their primary subject. They often display the cinematic apparatus and have an open narration. The ideal travel film carries the appealing landscapes that brought the audience toward an emotional attachment with the help of storytelling and characters.

Travelogues were usually about eighty minutes in length, consisting of two 1000-foot reels of 16mm film, with an intermission in-between to change reels. The travelogue film speaker, often but not always the filmmaker, would usually introduce each reel, ask for the lights to be dimmed, and then narrate the film live from an onstage lectern. Travelogue series were usually offered during the winter months and were often sold on subscription basis in small and medium-sized towns. Patrons could then meet the speaker in-person after the show.

As cinema progress, the standard film program provided by the most theaters consisted of a feature-length film accompanied by a newsreel and at least one additional short subject, which might take the form of a travelogue, a comedy, a cartoon, or a film about a topical novelty subject matter. Travelogues further developed to incorporate movie rides which were coordinated sounds, motion pictures and mechanical movement to simulate virtual travel. Cinéorama, which simulates a ride in a hot air balloon and Mareorama, which simulates voyages of the sea, became major attractions at world fairs and expositions.

Today's travelogues may be shown with either live or recorded voice-over narration, often with an in-sync audio soundtrack featuring music and location sound. The shows are often performed in school gymnasiums, civic auditoriums, senior center multi-purpose rooms, private clubs, and theatrical venues. Travelogues have been a popular source of fundraising for local, non-profit community-service organizations, such as Kiwanis, Lions Clubs, and Rotary Clubs, among others, with many such clubs hosting travelogue series for decades.

Travelogues stem from the work of American writer and lecturer, John Lawson Stoddard who began traveling around the world in 1874. He went on to publish books about his adventures and gave lectures across North America. The original lectures were accompanied by black and white lantern slides printed from his photographs. In 1892, John Lawson Stoddard recruited Burton Holmes as his junior associate. When Stoddard was ready to retire in 1897, he arranged for Holmes to take over the rest of his speaking arrangements. Holmes went on to become the premier travel lecturer of his day and coined the term, "travelogues," in 1904 when he introduced film clips to lecture series making them wildly popular. After World War II, Lowell Thomas created popular Movietone News Reel travelogues shown in movie theaters across the U.S.

During the 1950s and 1960s, more independent film producers created travelogues, which were shown in towns and schools across the U.S. and Canada. In the 1970s and 1980s, the popularity of traditional travelogues declined but the advent of cable television channels and the availability of small, high quality, digital video equipment has renewed the popularity of travel films. Though travelogues have enjoyed much popularity historically, these films have been criticized for culturally insensitive representations since the films were not made by anthropologists. A famous example is the film about a family in the Canadian Arctic, Nanook of the North, where much of the scenes were staged.

=== Modern ===
Travelogues are credited with helping cultivating the interest in the travel industry at the same time transportation infrastructure was being developed to make it possible. As railways and steamships became more accessible, more people became willing and eager to travel to distant places because of what was displayed in the popular travelogues of the day. Today, travelogues are most often seen in IMAX theaters and play a role in fiction film cinematography. IMAX was invented more than 40 years ago by Graeme Ferguson, Roman Kroiter, and Robert Kerr who pioneered the technology and debuted it at the EXPO 67 in Montreal, Canada and later again at EXPO 70 in Osaka, Japan. Since then, IMAX and travelogues have latched onto each other. In the 1970s and 1980s, the popularity of traditional travelogues declined. But the advent of cable television channels, such as the Discovery Channel and the Travel Channel and the availability of small, high quality, digital video equipment has renewed the popularity of travel films. Amateur films of an individual's travels can be considered travelogues as well. The Flavor of Kolkata (2015), a short travel documentary shot in the Indian city Kolkata, was India's first 3D short travel documentary.

== Key figures ==
- Burton Holmes was an American traveler, photographer and filmmaker, who coined the term "travelogue". Each summer for over fifty years Holmes would travel the world and then tour American auditoriums in the winter; during the 1945-46 season alone he gave 157 two-hour lectures. By the end of his life, Holmes's had given over 8,000 travelogue lectures which were known to draw large audiences in cities like New York, Boston, and Philadelphia. (Travel Film Archive).
- Santhosh George Kulangara is a professional traveller and media personality who has travelled across more than 130 countries and has documented it through his TV show Sancharam. He owns Safari TV, a television channel that explores travel and history.
- André de la Varre bought a motion picture camera and went to Europe at the age of 17. In 1924, he became Burton Holmes' cameraman. Starting in the 1930s, De La Varre became an independent film maker making shorts for major Hollywood Studios. He traveled and filmed constantly for the next 40 years. (Travel Film Archive).
- James A. Fitzpatrick has made 225 travelogues and traveled around the world 25 times in the process. In 1923, he formed Fitzpatrick Pictures and provided a stock set of images about the world at a time when hardly any international films were available to American audiences.
- Carl Dudley made 300 travel adventure films. It all started in 1935 when he traveled to Tahiti, Australia, and India working on film crews. In 1944, he started Dubley Pictures Corp. He is best known for Cinerama's South Seas Adventure. (Travel Film Archive).
- Robert Flaherty was an American film maker who directed and produced the first commercial successful feature documentary, Nanook of the North, in 1922.
- Eugene Castle was not a travel filmmaker but his company Castle Films was the largest distributor of films for the home and a contributing factor to the raise of popularity of travelogues. Castle went on to sell his company to Universal for $3 million in 1947. (Travel Film Archive).
- Bill Burrud produced the 1958 Treasure TV series and The Open Road. He coined the phrase "traventure."
- Edward M. Newman produced many travelogues for Warner Brothers studio in the 1930s.
- Sky Gaven is an American entrepreneur who in 2015 created and produced one of the most prolific digital travel series, "Shaycation" starring actress Shay Mitchell. The series changed the way YouTube formats were crafted and cemented itself as a pioneer in the travel genre.

== Notable examples ==
- The Amazing Race
- An Idiot Abroad - presented by Karl Pilkington
- Anthony Bourdain: No Reservations - travel and food documentary
- Around the World in 80 Treasures - with Dan Cruickshank. First broadcast by the BBC in 2005.
- Big Crazy Family Adventure
- Brazil with Michael Palin
- Bump!
- By Any Means
- The Coolest Places on Earth
- Departures
- Developing Destinations
- Don't Tell My Mother - presented by Diego Buñuel.
- Extreme Treks
- Extreme Vacations
- Full Circle with Michael Palin
- Getaway
- Getaway to Paradise
- Get Outta Town
- Globe Trekker
- Glutton for Punishment
- The Great Outdoors
- Holiday
- Himalaya with Michael Palin
- Intrepid Journeys
- Lonely Planet: Roads Less Travelled
- Lonely Planet Six Degrees
- Long Way Down
- Long Way Round
- Long Way Up
- Madventures
- Around the World in 80 Days with Michael Palin
- Michael Palin's Hemingway Adventure
- Michael Palin's New Europe
- MyDestination.TV
- The Moaning of Life - also presented by Karl Pilkington
- On Hannibal's Trail first broadcast by BBC in 2010
- Passport to Europe
- Pole to Pole
- Pinoy Abroad represents the Overseas Filipino Workers Around The World
- Race Across the World
- The Reluctant Traveler
- Rick Steves' Europe
- Ride with Norman Reedus
- Sahara with Michael Palin
- Sancharam (Santosh George Kulangara)
- Scam City
- Shaycation
- The Story of God with Morgan Freeman
- Tomohiro's Railway Tour of China
- Traceroute
- Up Up and Away
- Whicker's World
- World on Wheels
- World's Most Dangerous Roads - BBC series in which two celebrities journey by 4x4 on roads considered among the world's most dangerous.
- Word Travels - presented by Robin Esrock and Julia Dimon. First broadcast by OLN in 2008.
- Xtreme Tourist
- Xtreme Travel
- Vague Direction

== Broadcast stations ==
The following are TV stations that air primarily travel based content:

- Discover Barbados TV
- Évasion
- Russian Travel Guide
- Travel Channel
- Travel Channel (International)
- Travel + Escape
- Travelxp
- Voyages Television

== See also ==
- Digital storytelling
- Docudrama
- Ethnofiction
- Ethnographic film
- IMAX
- Mondo film
- Nature documentary
- Newsreel
- Reality film
- Realism (arts)
- Semidocumentary
- Travel Channel
- Travel literature
- Visual sociology
- Visual anthropology
