= British Academy Television Craft Award for Best Sound: Factual =

Award for technical achievements in TV

British Academy Television Craft Award
- Country: United Kingdom
- Presented by: British Academy of Film and Television Arts
- First award: 1992
- Currently held by: The Celebrity Traitors (2026)
- Website: http://www.bafta.org/

The British Academy Television Craft Award for Best Sound: Factual is one of the categories presented by the British Academy of Film and Television Arts (BAFTA) within the British Academy Television Craft Awards, the craft awards were established in 2000 with their own, separate ceremony as a way to spotlight technical achievements, without being overshadowed by the main production categories.

Before splitting into two categories for sound in 1992, Best Sound: Factual and Best Sound: Fiction, two categories were presented to recognize sound in television programming:

- From 1978 to 1991 Best Sound Supervisor was presented.
- From 1978 to 1991 Best Film Sound was presented.

== Winners and nominees ==
=== 1990s ===
Year	Title	Recipient(s)
1992	A Royal Gala: The Prince of Wales's Symphony for The Spire	Robert Edwards
1992	Live from The Proms	Paul Cunliffe
1992	The South Bank Show: Kiri Te Kanawa (Special)	Mike Fairman, Colin Martin, Team
1992	Mahler’s 8th Symphony	Graham Haines
1993	Elizabeth R	Peter Edwards, Colin Martin, Gary Franchi
1993	The Royal Variety Performance	John Caulfield, Tim Davies
1993	Nomads: Siberia	Lindsay Dodd, Finn Arden, Bob Jackson
1993	Celebration: Simply Red	Mike Hayes
1994	Inside Story: Traffic Jam	Stuart Bruce, Bob Jackson, Kathy Heaton
1994	Hookers, Hustlers, Pimps and Their Johns	Stuart Deutsch, Brooks Williams
1994	As It Happened The Killing of Kennedy	Peter Edwards, Colin Martin
1994	Secret Nature: Isles of Scilly	John Hale, Justin Smith
1995	Torvill and Dean: Facing the Music	David Welch, Paul Hardy, Keith Marriner
1995	Beyond the Clouds	Michael Danks, Anna Gregory, Geraldine Phillips, Colin Martin, Matt Skilton
1995	Blues and Twos	Bob Jackson, Colin Hobson, Team
1995	The Nick	Keith Rodgerson, Richard Hannan, John Wood
1996	The Beatles Anthology	Howie Nicol, Richard King, Andy Matthews, Danny Longhurst
1996	HMS Brilliant	Adrian Bell, Tony Anscombe, Trish Stephenson, Gary McIntyre
1996	True Stories: The Betrayed	Patrick Bolland, Michael Narduzzo
1996	The Private Life of Plants	Trevor Gosling, Lucy Rutherford, Martin Harries, Peter Hicks
1997	Blues and Twos	Bob Jackson, Chris Pancott, Steve Blincoe
1997	True Stories: Crime of the Wolf	Leonid Gavrichenko, Alexander Grusdev
1997	Great Railway Journeys	
1997	Soho Stories	Chris Terrill, Keith Wilkinson, George Foulgham
1998	Airport	John Rodda, Paul Roberts
1998	Full Circle with Michael Palin	Fraser Barber, Victoria Trow, Kathy Rodwell, Michael Narduzzo
1998	Hotel	Adrian Bell, Tim Watts, Paul Roberts
1998	Great Composers	
1999	The Life of Birds	
1999	Omnibus: Andre Previn	Bob Blauvelt, Bill Chesneau, Steve Jankowski, Peter Davies
1999	Lockerbie: A Night Remembered	David Lindsay, Matt Skilton
1999	The Human Body	

=== 2000s ===
Year	Title	Episode	Recipient(s)	Broadcaster
2000	Michael Palin's Hemingway Adventure		John Pritchard, Bob Jackson	BBC One
2000	Eye of the Storm		Ian Hills, Dion Stuart, Samantha Handy	ITV
2000	Paddington Green		John Rodda, Dudley Houlden, Paul Roberts	BBC One
2000	Shanghai Vice			Channel 4
2001	The South Bank Show	"Simon Rattle on Judith Weir"	Paul Vigars, Alex Thompson	ITV
2001	Britain at War in Colour		Brian Aherne	ITV
2001	Volcano		Victor Chainey, Chris Phinikas	Channel 4
2001	Omnibus	"Dudley Moore – After the Laughter"	Michael Lax	BBC One
2002	Hell in the Pacific		Peter Eason, Craig Butters, Cliff Jones	Channel 4
2002	Walking with Beasts		Kenny Clark, Jovan Ajder, Chris Burdon	BBC One
2002	The Blue Planet			BBC One
2002	Walk on By: The Story of Popular Song		Peter Davies, Paul Cowgill, Ravi Gurnam, Jane Barnett	BBC Two
2003	The Queen's Golden Jubilee			BBC One
2003	Wild Weather		Jovan Ajder, Simon Pinkerton, Dan Gable	BBC Two
2003	Sahara with Michael Palin		John Pritchard, George Foulgham	BBC One
2003	The Queen Mother’s Funeral			BBC One
2004	Operatunity		Trevor Hotz, Paul Parsons, Graham Haines	BBC Four
2004	Elephants – Spy in the Herd		Peter Davies, Paul Cowgill, Paul Cooper	BBC One
2004	Ancient Egyptians	"The Battle of Megiddo"	Paul Hamblin, Tim Owens, Max Bygrave	Channel 4
2004	Living with Michael Jackson		Samantha Handy, Zubin Sarosh, Dion Stuart	ITV
2005	The Genius of Mozart		Andy Rose, Tony Meering, Ben Baird	BBC One
2005	The Boy Whose Skin Fell Off		Bob Jackson	Channel 4
2005	Big Cat Week		Andy Hawley, Andy Milk, Andrew Wilson, Ian Bown	BBC One
2005	Himalaya with Michael Palin		John Pritchard, George Foulgham	BBC One
2006	Tsunami: 7 Hours on Boxing Day		Ben Baird, Gregor Lyon, Brian Howell	BBC One
2006	Holocaust: A Music Memorial Film from Auschwitz		Ben Baird, Mike Hatch	BBC Two
2006	The Genius of Beethoven		Ben Baird, Andy Rose, Tony Meering	BBC One
2006	Life in the Undergrowth			BBC One
2007	9/11: The Twin Towers		Peter Baldock, Tim White, Cliff Jones	BBC One
2007	Breaking Up with the Joneses		Ben Baird, Ursula MacFarlane, Saskia Wilson	Channel 4
2007	The Somme: From Defeat to Victory		Danny Finn	BBC One
2007	Planet Earth		Andrew Wilson, Kate Hopkins, Tim Owens, Graham Wild	BBC One
2008	War Oratorio		Paul Paragon, Mike Hatch, Ben Baird	Channel 4
2008	Michael Palin's New Europe		George Foulgham, John Pritchard	BBC One
2008	Trawlermen	"Pick of the Catch"	George Foulgham, Lisa McMahon	BBC One
2008	Seven Ages of Rock			BBC Two
2009	Ross Kemp in Afghanistan		James Snowden, Nick Fry	Sky One
2009	Louis Theroux: Behind Bars		Bob Jackson, James Baker	BBC Two
2009	The Family			Channel 4
2009	Wimbledon 2008 Men's Final			BBC Sport

=== 2010s ===
Year	Title	Episode	Recipient(s)	Broadcaster
2010	Trawlermen		George Foulgham, Lisa Marie McStay, Kiff McManus, Dafydd Baines	BBC One
2010	9/11: Phone Calls from the Towers		Ben Baird, Adam Wilks, Ben Lester, Merce Williams	Channel 4
2010	Nature's Great Events	"The Great Feast"	Paul Cowgill, Kate Hopkins, Andrew Wilson, Graham Wild	BBC One
2010	Life	"Insects"	Chris Domaille, Graham Wild, Tim Owens, Kate Hopkins	BBC One
2011	Elgar: The Man Behind the Mask		Paul Paragon, Jez Spencer, Mike Hatch	BBC Four
2011	Human Planet	"Oceans"	Martyn Harries, Kate Hopkins	BBC One
2011	Human Planet	"Jungles"	Willow Murton, Kate Hopkins, Mark Ferda, Rachael Kinley	BBC One
2011	Top Gear: Middle East Special			BBC Two
2012	Frozen Planet	"To the Ends of the Earth"	Kate Hopkins, Tim Owens, Graham Wild	BBC One
2012	The Choir: Military Wives		Daniel Jones, Sam Mathewson	BBC Two
2012	The Royal Wedding: Service in Westminster Abbey			BBC One
2012	Rostropovich: The Genius of the Cello		Tom O'Pray, Paul Paragon, Sam Santana	BBC Four
2013	The London 2012 Olympics: Super Saturday		Peter Bridges	BBC One
2013	Top Gear		Chris Lebert, Robert Entwistle, Russell Edwards, Kiff McManus	BBC Two
2013	Brazil with Michael Palin		George Foulgham, Sebastian Dunn	BBC One
2013	The Plane Crash		Grant Covacic, Pete Lee, Karl Mainzer, Michael Wood	Channel 4
2014	David Bowie – Five Years		Rowan Jennings, Karl Mainzer, Adam Scourfield	BBC Two
2014	Africa	"Kalahari"	Kate Hopkins, Tim Owens, Graham Wild	BBC One
2014	Britten's Endgame		Patrick Boland, Mike Hatch, Rowan Jennings, Paul Paragon	BBC Four
2014	David Attenborough’s Natural History Museum Alive 3D		Freddie Claire, Graham Kirkman, John Rogerson, Richard Addis	Sky 3D
2014	Hebrides – Islands on the Edge		Ben Peace, Kate Hopkins, Tim Owens	BBC Two
2015	Messiah at the Foundling Hospital		Mike Hatch, Kuz Randhawa, Matt Skilton	BBC Two
2015	Hidden Kingdoms	"Under Open Skies"	Max Bygrave, Tim Owens, Kate Hopkins, Ben Peace	BBC One
2015	The Choir: New Military Wives		Daniel Jones, Paul Taylor, Sarah Hunt, Pete Lee	BBC Two
2015	That Musical We Made		Roger Lucas, Oliver Rotchell, Stuart Hilliker, Alex Ellerington	BBC Two
2016	VE Day 70: The Nation Remembers		Andy James, Andy Payne, Andy Groves, Julian Pasqua	BBC One
2016	The Naked Choir with Gareth Malone		Daniel Jones, Gareth Malone, Conrad Fletcher, Mat Wood	BBC Two
2016	La Traviata: Love, Death and Divas		Matt Skilton, Mike Hatch, Tony Burke	BBC Two
2016	Great Barrier Reef with David Attenborough		John Rogerson, Richard Addis, Ryan Twyman, Freddie Claire	BBC One
2017	Planet Earth II	"Cities"	Graham Wild, Kate Hopkins, Tim Owens	BBC One
2017	Forces of Nature with Brian Cox		John Rogerson, Jay Price, Laurie Goode, Andy Paddon	BBC One
2017	Planet Earth II	"Jungles"	Kate Hopkins, Graham Wild	BBC One
2017	Olympic Opening Ceremony 2016			BBC One
2018	Blue Planet II	"Coral Reefs"	Graham Wild, Tim Owens, Kate Hopkins	BBC One
2018	Mountain: Life at the Extreme	"Himalaya"	Graham Wild, George Fry, James Burchill	BBC Two
2018	World War One Remembered: Passchendaele		Andy Deacon, Kevin Duff, Andy James, Mark McLoughlin	BBC One
2018	David Bowie: The Last Five Years		Karl Mainzer, Rowan Jennings, Adam Scourfield, Sean O'Neil	BBC One
2018	The Grand Tour		Russell Edwards, Tristan Powell, Robert Entwistle, Marc Wojtanowski	Amazon Prime Video
2019	Later Live with Jools Holland			BBC Two
2019	Michael Palin in North Korea		Doug Dreger, Rowan Jennings	Channel 5
2019	Amy Winehouse: Back to Black (Classic Albums)		Kate Davis, Steve Onopa	BBC Four
2019	Dynasties	"Chimpanzees"	Tim Owens, Graham Wild, Katie Hopkins	BBC One

=== 2020s ===
Year	Title	Episode	Recipient(s)	Broadcaster
2020	Battle of the Brass Bands			Sky Arts
2020	Our Planet	"One Planet"	Tim Owens	Netflix
2020	Formula 1: Drive to Survive		Nick Fry, Steve Speed, James Evans, Nick Adams	Netflix
2020	Seven Worlds, One Planet		Graham Wild, Kate Hopkins	BBC One
2021	Formula 1: Drive to Survive		Nick Fry, Steve Speed, James Evans, Hugh Dwan	Netflix
2021	Earth At Night In Color		Kate Hopkins, Tim Owens, Graham Wild, Paul Ackerman, Tom Mercer	Apple TV+
2021	Hitsville: The Making of Motown		Richard Kondal, Alex Outhwaite, Adrian Sandu	Sky Documentaries
2021	Springwatch 2020			BBC Two
2022	1971: The Year That Music Changed Everything		Stephen Griffiths, Andy Shelley, Nas Parkash, Dan Johnson, Tae Hak Kin, Claire Ellis	Apple TV+
2022	The Funeral of HRH The Prince Philip, Duke of Edinburgh		Conrad Fletcher, Julian Gough, Andy James, Andy Payne	BBC One
2022	Formula 1: Drive to Survive		Doug Dreger, Andrew Yarme, Nick Fry, Steve Speed, Hugh Dwan, James Evans	Netflix
2022	Earth At Night In Color		Kate Hopkins, Jonny Crew, Paul Ackerman, Graham Wild	Apple TV+
2023	The State Funeral of HM Queen Elizabeth II		Peter Bridges, Matthew Charles, Conrad Fletcher, Julian Gough, Andy James, Andy Payne	BBC One
2023	Formula 1: Drive to Survive		Doug Dreger, Andrew Yarme, Nick Fry, Steve Speed, James Evans, Hugh Dwan	Netflix
2023	Frozen Planet II	"Frozen Worlds"	Kate Hopkins, Tim Owens, Graham Wild	BBC One
2023	Later... with Jools Holland		Tudor Davies	BBC Two
2024	The Coronation of TM The King and Queen Camilla			BBC One
2024	The Enfield Poltergeist		Nick Ryan, Ben Baird, Kirstie Howell, Jack Wensley, Jamie McPhee, Alexej Mungersdorff	Apple TV+
2024	If These Walls Could Sing		George Foulgham, Philip Moroz, Alex Gibson, Tom Verstappen, Adam Prescod	Disney+
2024	Formula 1: Drive to Survive			Netflix
2025	Secret World of Sound with David Attenborough		Brian Moseley, Angela Groves, Paul Fisher, Chris Watson, Ioannis Spanos	Sky Nature
2025	Backstage with the London Philharmonic Orchestra		Kurt Howard, Calum Thomson, Edwin Matthews	Sky Arts
2025	Earthsounds			Apple TV+
2025	Apollo 13: Survival		Paul Darling, Greg Gettens, Glen Gathard, Rebecca Heathcote	Netflix
2026	The Celebrity Traitors			BBC One
2026	Formula 1: Drive to Survive			Netflix
2026	The Last Musician of Auschwitz		Tristan Powell, Will Chapman	BBC Two
2026	The Lost Music of Auschwitz		Andy Deacon, Kevin Duff, Will Thomas, Jonathan Gibson	Sky Arts

- Note: The series that don't have recipients on the tables had Sound team credited as recipients for the award or nomination.

== See also ==
- Primetime Emmy Award for Outstanding Sound Editing for a Nonfiction or Reality Program (Single or Multi-Camera)
- Primetime Emmy Award for Outstanding Sound Mixing for a Nonfiction or Reality Program (Single or Multi-Camera)
