= Around the World in 80 Days with Michael Palin =

1989 British television travel documentary series

- Title sequence of the series featuring passport-style markings.
- Based on: Around the World in Eighty Days by Jules Verne
- Written by: Michael Palin
- Directed by: Roger Mills
- Presented by: Michael Palin
- Composer: Paddy Kingsland
- Country of origin: United Kingdom
- Original language: English
- No. of series: 1
- No. of episodes: 7

Production
- Producer: Clem Vallance
- Editor: David Thomas
- Running time: 52 minutes

Original release
- Network: BBC1
- Release: 11 October – 22 November 1989

Around the World in 80 Days with Michael Palin is a 7-part BBC television travel series first broadcast on BBC1 from 11 October to 22 November 1989, and presented by comedian and actor Michael Palin. Inspired by Jules Verne's 1872 novel Around the World in Eighty Days, in which Phileas Fogg accepts a wager to circumnavigate the globe in eighty days or less, Palin takes on the same task, prohibited from using aircraft in order to use a combination of trains, boats and other forms of transport, to take him across several countries around his circumnavigation of the world, including Italy, India, Egypt, China, Japan, and the United States.

The programme was a critical and commercial success, gaining strong ratings in the UK and selling well abroad. It was also released on video tape and later on DVD. Following the trip Michael Palin wrote a book about the experience. The book contains much more detail, along with photographs, than could be presented in the TV programme, and Palin's personal views are also more evident.

The series later spawned two further globe-crossing series featuring Palin – Pole to Pole with Michael Palin (travelling from the North Pole to the South Pole), an 8-part series first broadcast on BBC One in 1992; and Full Circle with Michael Palin (the circumnavigation of the Pacific Rim), a 10-part series first broadcast on BBC One in 1997 – as well as addition travel series in later years – Hemingway Adventure (following in the footsteps of Ernest Hemingway) first broadcast in 1999, Sahara (travelling around and through the Sahara Desert) first broadcast in 2002, Himalaya (travelling around the Himalayas) first broadcast in 2004, New Europe (travelling around Eastern Europe) first broadcast in 2007, Brazil first broadcast in 2012, Michael Palin in North Korea broadcast in 2018, and Michael Palin: Into Iraq aired in 2022.

== Synopsis ==
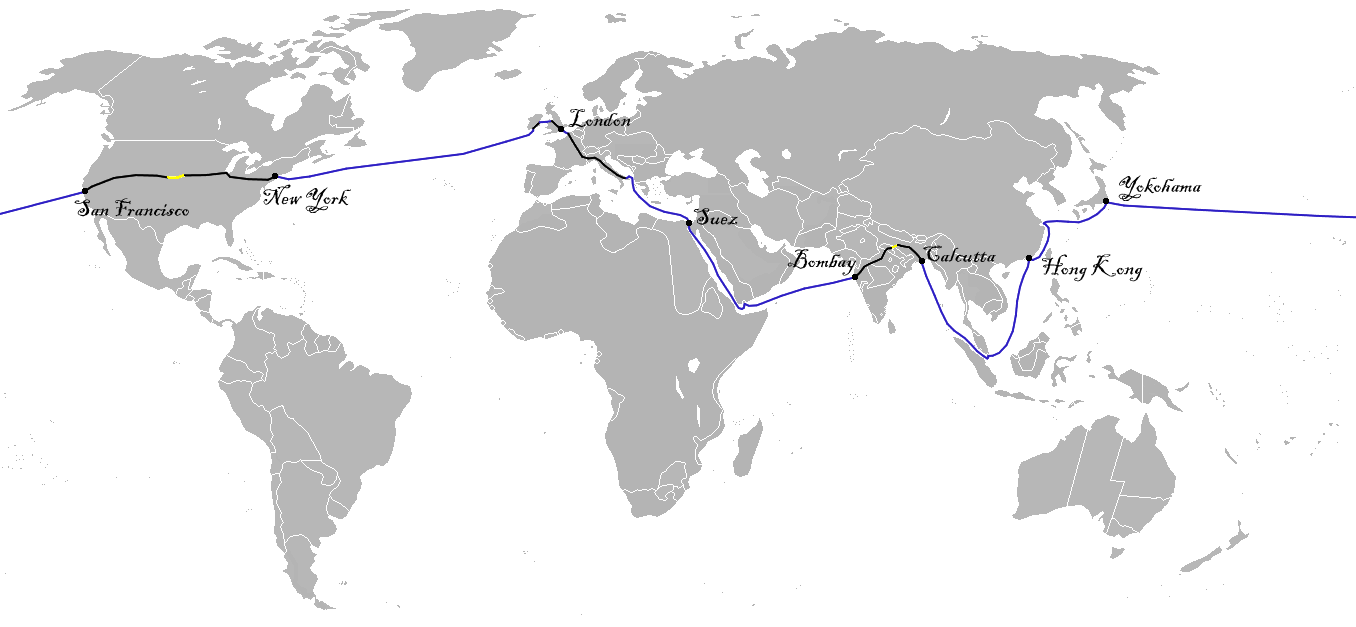
Phileas Fogg's fictional journey

Palin's journey

In 1988, the BBC offers Michael Palin a challenge to undertake for them – to circumnavigate the world in 80 days, much like Jules Verne's fictional character Phileas Fogg undertook in Verne's 1873 novel Around the World in Eighty Days. With the start and finish line being the Reform Club in London, Palin would be required to not use aircraft, which would not have been around in the late 19th century, instead relying on various modes of transportation, mostly consisting of passenger trains and commercial ships. In agreement to this, Palin was also given the task of acquiring a series of souvenirs along the journey for three 'referees' - Robert Hewison, and fellow Pythons Terry Jones and Terry Gilliam. Accompanying Palin would be a small five-man film crew, who the comedian collectively names after Passepartout, Phileas Fogg's manservant.

Each episode of the series focuses on a specific leg of the journey, and the sights and people Palin encounters. In addition, the show also features the various problems and obstacles encountered on the journey that impeded progress, and Palin and his team's efforts to overcome them by negotiations and finding alternative arrangements to keep on track of completing the circumnavigation within the eighty day limit.

== Episodes ==
Countries visited during Around the World in 80 Days.

No.	Title	Original release date
1	"The Challenge"	11 October 1989
Michael Palin agrees to a challenge offered by the BBC – to travel around the world in 80 days, much like Jules Verne's character Phileas Fogg. Following preparation for the journey, including arrangements for money, meeting seasoned TV traveller Alan Whicker, and being given a list of items to collect on his travels, Palin sets off from the Reform Club in London, heading for Alexandria Egypt. Along the way, he mingles with passengers on the Venice-Simplon Orient Express, rides with garbage men on their gondola in Venice, sees the world-renowned Evzones while travelling through Greece, and has cream tea with British soldiers stationed on the island of Crete.
2	"Arabian Frights"	18 October 1989
Palin makes for Cairo, where he spends some time to watch a local football match, make a cameo in an Egyptian film, and visit the Pyramids in Giza. Heading for the Red Sea, a cancelled ferry passage to Saudi Arabia delays his travel to Jeddah, making him miss an important connection. With little choice, he takes a moment to jog around some interesting art pieces in the city, before the authorities grant him passage to cross the country towards the city of Dubai in the United Arab Emirates, though under conditions that force most of Palin's team to make alternative arrangements.
3	"Ancient Mariners"	25 October 1989
At Dubai, Palin and his team, having suffered delays, seek to find passage to India. The group find salvation with the crew of a dhow called the Al-Sharma, which can take them across the Arabian Sea to Bombay. Preparing for the journey, Palin soon finds that despite the sleeping arrangements and basic facilities, he can do little but enjoy the journey, where he soon learns how the crew, who he learns are family, live their life on the Dhow. Notes: This episode was not originally planned for the series, but the producers received special permission to create it due to the amount of footage obtained from the dhow journey. Palin would later track down the crew from this episode in a BBC television documentary, Around the World in 20 Years, to reunite with them.
4	"A Close Shave"	1 November 1989
In Bombay, Palin, waiting for his train connection to Madras, spends a day experiecing a shave from a blind barber, watching a snake charmer's performance, and meeting astrologer Jagjit Uppal for one of the required items on his list. After journeying aboard the "Southern Express", making a brief stop at Pune, he and his team soon face problems securing passage to Singapore, until negotiations allow Palin and one of his crew to secure space on a Yugoslavian freighter, but with clear concerns about making their next connection on time. Notes: Palin would later be reunited with the captain of the freighter during filming of his New Europe series; the meeting features as part of the deleted scenes on the DVDs for that series.
5	"Oriental Express"	8 November 1989
At Singapore, Palin finds his connection to China has just left, but miraculously it is only a few miles off shore, allowing him to catch up to it with a fast motorboat. The ship brings him to the busy port city of Hong Kong, where he takes the opportunity to enjoy life in the metropolis, betting on a horse race, checking out Kowloon, and attending a party in his honour for reaching the halfway point in his journey. Heading afterwards to mainland China, accompanied by his photographer friend Basil Pao, he proceeds by train to reach the city of Shanghai, along the way experiencing a meal where the main ingredient is snake, and securing another of the items on his list during a stop at a station.
6	"Far East and Farther East"	15 November 1989
In Shanghai, Palin secures herbal remedies for his journey, and spends his final day with Basil Pao to watch a Chinese jazz band. Travelling to Japan by ferry, he heads for Tokyo aboard the world-famous shinkansen train, where he explores the city with British journalist David Powers, sampling life in a sushi bar and karaoke bar, and spending a night in a capsule hotel. Eventually, he gains passage aboard a container ship that will take eleven days to cross the Pacific Ocean to the United States, where on the journey the ship's crew entertain them with a party for one the production team, before inviting Palin to partake in an unusual ceremony to commemorate crossing the International Date Line.
7	"Dateline to Deadline"	22 November 1989
Arriving in Long Beach, California, Palin explores the beachside attractions while booked for a few nights within the permanently berthed Queen Mary. Boarding an Amtrak train eastwards, he makes a stopover in Colorado to experience a hot-air balloon ride and a dog sled trip, before making a hurried journey to New York City after a nervous moment in Chicago. Finally, he secures passage on a container ship for the UK, where the final leg of his journey sees him making train connections from Felixstowe to London. Palin reaches the finish line within 80 days, before meeting his friends to present them with the souvenirs they requested from him.

== Production ==
The journey around the world lasted from 25 September to 12 December 1988. Palin travelled through the following countries by foot, train, ship, balloon, and husky dog, amongst other methods of transport (except for aircraft): United Kingdom, France, Switzerland, Austria, Italy, Greece, Egypt, Saudi Arabia, Qatar, United Arab Emirates, India, Singapore, Hong Kong, China, Japan, and the United States.

Only four members of Palin's film crew completed the circumnavigation: Clem Vallance and Roger Mills (the directors), and Angela Elbourne and Ann Holland (the production assistants). The three others who started with him left when they got to Hong Kong, and were replaced by others. Strictly speaking, it was only Palin who obeyed the rules of the journey, as the production team was not allowed on the road trip across Saudi Arabia and Qatar (Palin and Clem Vallance did this stretch) or on the Croatian ship (Palin and Nigel Meakin did this stretch). The remainder of the team flew on these stretches. During the Jeddah to Dubai episode, Palin managed to snap a few pictures, which are seen in the documentary.

While preparing for the journey, Palin had a chat with documentarist Alan Whicker. In the book and an interview on the DVD, Palin mentions that Whicker had been the BBC's first choice of presenter, but he and two others (Miles Kington and Noel Edmonds) had declined; Palin was fourth on the BBC's list.

== Around the World in 20 Years ==
On 30 December 2008, the BBC aired a special one-hour documentary entitled Around the World in 20 Years. In it, Palin goes in search of the crew of the Al Shama, the dhow which carried him from Dubai to Bombay (now Mumbai) some 20 years ago. After an extensive search involving the shipping company that owned Al Shama, Palin tracks them to the city of Mandvi in Gujarat. There, Palin finds the captain of Al Shama himself, along with five other members of the crew. Two of the original crew members had died in the intervening years, one of them being the older man whom Palin had let listen to Bruce Springsteen on his Walkman. Palin also discovers that the Al Shama had sunk in the Indian Ocean while being towed for repairs years before. The production crew are the same people as on 80 Days.
