= Full Circle (Palin book) =

1997 book by Michael Palin

- Hardcover first edition, 1997, BBC Books
- Author: Michael Palin
- Language: English
- Series: Michael Palin's Trips
- Genre: Travel literature
- Publisher: BBC Books
- Publication date: 1997
- Publication place: United Kingdom
- Media type: Print (Hardback & Paperback)
- Pages: 320
- ISBN: 0-563-37121-8
- OCLC: 37851763
- Preceded by: Pole to Pole
- Followed by: Hemingway Adventure

Full Circle is a travel book by writer and television presenter Michael Palin. Full Circle is a written accompaniment for Palin's 1997 BBC travel documentary Full Circle with Michael Palin. The book recounts the journey of Palin and the BBC film crew to countries and regions around the rim of the Pacific Ocean in 1996 and 1997. Full Circle consists of text by Palin and photographs by Basil Pao, who accompanied the crew on the trip. Basil Pao also produced a book, Full Circle - The Photographs, containing many more of his pictures.

Palin visits various locations in the Russia, United States, Japan, South Korea, China, Vietnam, Philippines, Malaysia, Indonesia, Australia, New Zealand, Chile, Bolivia, Peru, Colombia, Mexico and Canada, with each region appearing as a separate chapter. Each chapter features a day-by-day recount, similar to a diary, with headings such as "Day 43 - Huis Ten Bosch". There are occasional breaks in this format, however, where particular days are not mentioned.

The trip described in the book covered 50,000 miles (80,000 km) through 17 countries over a period of ten months, the longest of Palin's trips.

== Audio edition ==
This book is available as an audiobook, read by Michael Palin. There are two versions available. The abridged version lasts 6 hours and the unabridged version 11 hours, 53 minutes.
