= Himalaya (book) =

2004 book by Michael Palin

- Hardcover first edition, 2004, Weidenfeld & Nicolson
- Author: Michael Palin
- Language: English
- Series: Michael Palin's Trips
- Genre: Travel literature
- Publisher: Weidenfeld & Nicolson
- Publication date: 2004
- Publication place: United Kingdom
- Media type: Print (Hardback & Paperback)
- Pages: 288
- ISBN: 0-297-84371-0
- OCLC: 56627103
- Preceded by: Sahara
- Followed by: New Europe

Himalaya is the book that Michael Palin wrote to accompany the BBC television documentary series Himalaya with Michael Palin.

This book, like the other books that Michael Palin wrote following each of his seven trips for the BBC, consists both of his text and of many photographs to illustrate the trip. All of the pictures in this book were taken by Basil Pao, the stills photographer who was part of the team who did the trip (Pao also produced a book, Inside Himalaya, containing many more of his pictures).

The book contains eight chapters: Pakistan, India, Nepal, Tibet, Yunnan (China), Nagaland and Assam(India), Bhutan, and Bangladesh. The book is presented in a diary format; Palin starts each section of the book with a heading such as "Day Forty One: Srinagar". Not all days are mentioned, a result of the trip as a whole being broken up into shorter trips (a fact that is not mentioned in the series).

Palin makes several treks up into the mountains, including one trek up to Everest Base Camp at 17,500 feet (5,300 meters). Other encounters and experiences that are related by Michael Palin include finding out that the Dalai Lama not only knew who he was, but was a fan of Palin's TV programmes.

== Audio edition ==
This book is available as an audiobook, read by Michael Palin. There are two versions available. The abridged version lasts 6 hours and the unabridged version 11 hours, 30 minutes.
