= Trawlerman =

Trawlerman can refer to:

- Trawlerman, a sea-fisherman who works on a fishing trawler
- Trawlermen, a series which ran from 2006 to 2009 on BBC TV, about the lives of some North Sea trawlermen
