= Around the World in 80 Days (Palin book) =

Kniha je kniha ale je ještě i komiks který se dává do čtyřlístku

- Hardcover first edition, 1989, BCA
- Author: Michael Palin
- Language: English
- Series: Michael Palin's Trips
- Genre: Travel literature
- Publisher: BCA
- Publication date: 1989
- Publication place: United Kingdom
- Media type: Print (Hardback and Paperback)
- Pages: 256
- Followed by: Pole to Pole with Michael Palin

Around the World in 80 Days is the 1989 book that Michael Palin wrote to accompany the BBC TV programme Around the World in 80 Days with Michael Palin.

This trip was intended to follow in the footsteps of the (fictitious) Phileas Fogg in the 1873 Jules Verne book Around the World in Eighty Days. The use of aeroplanes was not allowed, a self-imposed restriction. Steam liners don't exist any more, so all of the long sea journeys had to be on container ships or freighters. The one exception was the trip from Dubai to Mumbai (Bombay) on a dhow, a high point of the trip.

This book, like the other books that Michael Palin wrote following each of his seven trips for the BBC, consists both of his text and of many photographs to illustrate the trip. Unlike the following books, in which the pictures were taken (almost) exclusively by Basil Pao, the pictures in this book are from many sources. (Basil Pao did provide the pictures for the Hong Kong to Shanghai stretch.)

To some extent the book reads like a diary, as Michael Palin starts each section of the book with a heading like "Day 42 - Hong Kong". This reflects the fact that the whole trip was a kind of "race against time" effort, and being aware of how many days have passed and how many days are left before the magic number 80 arrives adds extra excitement.

An interesting aspect of this trip is that almost 3/4 of the time (59 days) was spent getting around the first half of the globe (Europe, Middle East, Asia, Pacific to the International Date Line) and only 1/4 of the time (21 days) for the last half of the trip (rest of the Pacific, U.S.A., Atlantic). This is also reflected in the number of pages in this book: 180 for the first half of the trip, 60 for the last half.

There are a couple of reasons for this discrepancy. Traveling across the Pacific and the Atlantic was done on fast modern container ships. The trip across the U.S.A. was done by train, which was fairly fast, and this stretch was presumably considered to be less interesting for Western TV viewers (the intended audience) than the more exotic parts in the Middle East and Asia.

One major difference between this trip and the following Michael Palin trips for the BBC was the desire to follow a preordained route that involved a lot of time traveling at sea. Consequently, several segments spent long periods at sea with limited ground footage. For example, Michael Palin arrives in Singapore harbor on one ship at midnight, rushes through immigration and departure processing, and embarks on the next ship at 2:45 a.m. Neither Palin nor the viewers get to see a single view of Singapore.

The text of this book is available free to read online on Michael Palin's official web site.

== Audio edition ==
This book is available as an unabridged audiobook, read by Michael Palin and lasts 7 hours 35 minutes.
