= Sahara (Palin book) =

Book written by Michael Palin

- Hardcover first edition
- Author: Michael Palin
- Language: English
- Series: Michael Palin's Trips
- Genre: Travel literature
- Publisher: Weidenfeld & Nicolson
- Publication date: 2002
- Publication place: United Kingdom
- Media type: Print (Hardback & Paperback)
- Pages: 288
- ISBN: 0-297-84303-6
- OCLC: 50054723
- Preceded by: Hemingway Adventure
- Followed by: Himalaya

Sahara is the book that Michael Palin wrote to accompany the BBC television documentary series Sahara with Michael Palin.

This book, like the other books that Palin wrote following each of his seven trips for the BBC, consists both of his text and of many photographs to illustrate the trip. All of the pictures in this book were taken by Basil Pao, the stills photographer who was part of the team who did the trip (Basil Pao also produced a book, Inside Sahara, containing many more of his pictures).

This trip involved traveling all around and through the Sahara Desert, starting and ending at Gibraltar. The book contains 13 chapters: Gibraltar, Morocco, Algeria, Western Sahara, Mauritania, Senegal, Mali, Niger, Algeria, Libya, Tunisia, Algeria, and Gibraltar. The reason Algeria is featured three times is that the trip first cut through part of western Algeria, then later up through south, central and eastern Algeria, and finally on the return trip followed the Mediterranean coast of northern Algeria. Some of these countries are huge; for example, Algeria is four times the size of France or three times the size of Texas. The Sahara Desert is roughly the same size as the United States, and the trip covered 10,000 miles (16,000 km.) and took three months.

The book is presented in a diary format; Palin starts each section of the book with a heading like "Day Forty-Two: Djenne". However, not all days are mentioned, a result of this trip being broken up into shorter trips, a fact that is not mentioned in the TV programme.

== Audio edition ==
This book is available as an audiobook, read by Michael Palin. There are two versions available. The abridged version lasts 6 hours and the unabridged version 9 hours, 52 minutes.
