= New Europe (book) =

Book by Michael Palin

- First edition
- Author: Michael Palin
- Language: English
- Series: Michael Palin's Trips
- Genre: Travel literature
- Publisher: Weidenfeld & Nicolson
- Publication date: 2007
- Publication place: United Kingdom
- Media type: Print (Hardback
- Pages: 288
- ISBN: 978-0-297-84449-5
- OCLC: 141379962
- Preceded by: Himalaya
- Followed by: Brazil

New Europe is a travelogue written by Michael Palin as an accompaniment for the BBC television documentary series Michael Palin's New Europe.

This book, like the other books that Michael Palin wrote following each of his seven trips for the BBC, consists both of his text and of many photographs to illustrate the trip. All of the pictures in this book were taken by Basil Pao, the stills photographer who was part of the team who did the trip.

The book contains 21 chapters: Slovenia, Croatia, Bosnia & Herzegovina, Albania, Macedonia, Bulgaria, Turkey, Moldova, Romania, Serbia, Hungary, Ukraine, Estonia, Latvia, Lithuania, Kaliningrad/Russia, Poland, Slovakia, Czech Republic, and Germany. The book is presented in a diary format; Palin starts each section of the book with a heading such as "Day Forty One: Selçuk". Not all days are mentioned, in part a result of the trip as a whole being broken up into several shorter trips.

Recurring themes in the book include the question of how the citizens of these countries compare the current situation with the Communist years and the expectations these people have of the future and the enlarged European Union.

Palin occasionally commits glaring errors in the book. Most strikingly, he refers to the Estonian language as being made up of thousands of "characters", when it is in fact written in the Latin script.

== Audio edition ==
This book is available as an audiobook, read by Michael Palin. There are two versions available. The abridged version lasts 7 hours, 30 minutes and the unabridged version 11 hours, 32 minutes.
