= Full Circle with Michael Palin =

1997 British television travel documentary series

- DVD cover
- Written by: Michael Palin
- Directed by: Roger Mills
- Presented by: Michael Palin
- Theme music composer: Peter Howell
- Composer: Elizabeth Parker
- Country of origin: United Kingdom
- Original language: English
- No. of series: 1
- No. of episodes: 10

Production
- Executive producers: Anne James (Prominent Television); Edward Mirzoeff (BBC)
- Producers: Roger Mills; Clem Vallance (Series Producer)
- Cinematography: Nigel Meakin; Stephen Robinson
- Editor: Alex Richardson
- Running time: 50 minutes
- Production companies: Prominent Television; BBC; BBC Worldwide Americas; Passepartout Productions

Original release
- Network: BBC One
- Release: 31 August – 9 November 1997

Related
- Pole to Pole with Michael Palin; Michael Palin's Hemingway Adventure

Full Circle with Michael Palin is a 10-part 1997 documentary television series, first broadcast on BBC One from 31 August to 9 November 1997. Presented by Michael Palin, Full Circle was the third of a series of programmes in which Palin made and documented lengthy journeys. The first was Around the World in 80 Days with Michael Palin, a 7-part series first broadcast in 1989, and the second was Pole to Pole with Michael Palin, an 8-part series first broadcast in 1992.

The series documented a 245-day, 50,000-mile (80,000 km) trip taken by Palin and a film crew around the rim of the Pacific Ocean in 1995 and 1996, beginning on the Diomede Islands between Alaska and Russia in the Bering Strait. The intent was to make the full anti-clockwise trip around the Pacific Rim and end up back on the Diomede Islands, but due to rough weather, he was unable to actually set foot back on the Islands again at the end of his journey, bringing him within two miles of completing the full circle. Palin travelled through Russia, Japan, South Korea (they were not allowed to pass through North Korea), China, Vietnam, Philippines, Malaysia, Indonesia, Australia, New Zealand, Chile, Bolivia, Peru, Colombia, Mexico, United States, and Canada.

Palin also authored a companion book based upon the series, which was published concurrently with its first broadcast. This book contained both Palin's text and many pictures by Basil Pao, the stills photographer on the team. Pao also produced a separate book of the photographs he took during the journey, Full Circle – The Photographs, a large coffee-table style book printed on glossy paper.

== Episodes ==
The programme consists of 10 episodes, each 50 minutes long. Unlike the first two Michael Palin journeys, the episodes were not given names, and are just presented as "Episode One", etc.

=== Episode One: Alaska and Russia ===
Palin begins his trek around the Pacific Rim at Little Diomede Island, Alaska, in hopes of returning there in a year's time. Arriving at Nome, he visits with a goldpanner on the "Golden Sands of Nome". Next, he journeys to Kodiak Island, but gets stuck for a couple of extra days due to fog and misses the flight he had planned with the US Coast Guard to the western island of Attu. However, he does catch a glimpse of the Kodiak brown bear. Palin and his crew find an alternative: they catch the last Alaska Airlines flight of the year from Anchorage to Petropavlovsk in Russia. Arriving on the Kamchatka Peninsula, he meets his guide Igor Nosov and his assistants. They board a helicopter and observe the Kronotsky Nature Reserve, which contains some active volcanoes, as well as some reindeer. Moving on to the city of Magadan, he visits an old Gulag camp with a survivor. In Vladivostok, he observes the once-powerful Pacific Fleet and is given an opportunity to sing Polyushko-polye with the Pacific Fleet Ensemble.

=== Episode Two: Japan and Korea ===
Palin begins his time in Japan at Sado Island, where he meets the Kodō drummers. He participates in a morning run with drummer hopefuls and then takes his shot at the largest drum. Then it is on to Tokyo, where he meets up with Mayumi Nobetsu, a Japanese Monty Python fan. They tour the Asakusa neighbourhood where they decide to bet on a horse race. Palin and Nobetsu strike gold with a horse named Super License. The two also eat at a restaurant where the speciality is loaches who have been fed sake. Afterwards, they catch a punk rock concert in Yoyogi Park. Catching the shinkansen to Fukuyama, he takes in a Zen Buddhist meditation session at Buttsuji Temple. During the meditation session in the Zendo, he is struck by a keisaku, which is used to keep meditators from lulling off to sleep. In Nagasaki, he visits Huis ten Bosch, a Dutch-themed park set to symbolise old trading ties with the Dutch.

After catching a ferry to Busan in South Korea, he meets up with Shin-Na, a journalist in the capital of Seoul. Shin-Na explains to him that there still exists animosity between Koreans and the Japanese, none more evident than in the fact that most Japanese cultural items are still banned in Korea. The two then witness a rally protesting generals' immunity from prosecution in a bloody massacre in Gwangju in the early 1980s. (About 3 months after Palin left Seoul, the generals were prosecuted and imprisoned.) At the South Seoul Marriage Hall, Palin and Shin-Na attend a wedding ceremony. Palin notices that the number of traditional Korean marriages are dwindling. Not too long after, Palin encounters his first roadblock of the journey: North Korea. He can only go with a group of foreign tourists (no Koreans are allowed) led by one of the Americans stationed at the DMZ. He then "crosses" the border in the Joint Security Area at Panmunjeom into the North; however, he cannot venture much further than that without risking being shot or arrested. He looks out into North Korea and states that North and South Korea are not really two separate nations, that it is one nation divided against itself. Twenty-three years later, he would have the chance to tour North Korea in Michael Palin in North Korea.

=== Episode Three: China ===
Arriving in China at the port city of Qingdao, Palin checks into the Welcome Guest House, where Mao Zedong once spent a month right before the Great Leap Forward. Palin gets a massage on the streets of Qingdao and then visits a winery in the Laoshan Mountains, where he samples Chinese chardonnay. He then climbs Taishan Mountain, one of the Five Sacred Mountains of Taoism. Catching a train to Shanghai, he notices how much more modern Chinese trains have become since Around the World in 80 Days in 1988. Arriving in Shanghai, he discovers a Harvey Nichols store. Palin also takes time out to dance with one of the locals. He also finds out that the Bund, the longtime economic heart of the city (even when he last visited), has been usurped by the Pudong area. Taking an inland route via the Yangtze River, he views the construction for the Three Gorges Dam and notes how a lot of areas will be submerged after its completion in 2009. In the large town of Chongqing, he chats with a university graduate over lunch about modern Chinese society. From there, Palin heads south into Guiyang and then the land of the Miao people, a Chinese minority. Some people in a Miao village note that Palin is the first Westerner they had ever seen, as well as the fact he has a big nose. From there, he catches a bus to Pingxiang and Friendship Pass, on the Vietnamese border.

=== Episode Four: Vietnam and the Philippines ===
Palin arrives in Vietnam at a time when it is reintroducing itself to the global stage, via a process called Đổi mới ("new thinking"). He also observes a local cricket match in the capital of Hanoi, although the BBC is not allowed to film because, due to the fact it took place on land owned by the Vietnamese military, it was deemed a security risk. In a series of still photographs shown in the absence of film, it is revealed that the camera is an Eclair XTR. Palin also observes the Hanoi Hilton, a prison for Americans during the Vietnam War. Catching a train going south to Saigon, he makes a stop in Huế and the Forbidden Purple City, an old imperial palace. In Da Nang, Palin relaxes at China Beach and meets up with a 16-year-old who shows him what is known as the Gateway to Heaven. In Saigon, he tours the Củ Chi tunnels which the Vietnamese military used during all the conflicts within their borders. In nearby Tay Ninh, he visits a Caodaist cathedral. Then he takes a ferry down to the end of the Mekong River.

In the Philippines, Palin notices how congested traffic is in the capital of Manila. He then chats with some women who are going abroad to work in order to support their families. Palin then takes the opportunity to observe the Banaue Rice Terraces. However, when he gets there, a dense fog prevents him from seeing the terraces, causing frustrated and disbelieving laughter. In Baguio, he witnesses two unique procedures (assisting in one of them) known as "psychic surgery". In the southern part of the country, Palin gets some scuba diving lessons and has a meal underwater. In Zamboanga, he attends a cockfight and also judges the Miss La Bella Pacifica beauty pageant. Afterwards, he drives a jeepney down the streets of the city, waiting for a ferry to take him to Borneo.

=== Episode Five: Borneo and Java ===
Palin catches a ferry across the Sulu Sea to the northern tip of Borneo. There, he visits an orangutan rehabilitation centre. From there, he ventures south to Kuching in Sarawak, once ruled by what were known as the White Rajahs. Then he travels inward to a longhouse where members of the Iban people reside. He chats with former headhunters and takes part in a special feast honouring the highest-ranking Iban in the Malaysian government.

Afterwards, he ventures south to the island of Java in Indonesia. From the capital Jakarta, he journeys east with his guide to a tea plantation where he samples tea and helps harvest tea leaves. They then observe a wayang kulit puppet show. In the cultural hub of Yogyakarta, they sample some durian, a pungent fruit. They then tour the Buddhist temple at Borobudur and climb Mount Bromo. In Surabaya on the east coast of Java, they encounter their first major transportation issues since Alaska. Being unable to find a boat to take him across the sea to Darwin, Australia, they settle for one that will take them east on Java, but no further.

In the DVD interview, Palin states that while in Kuching, he learned that his wife, Helen, needed surgery to remove a brain tumor. He flew back to London from Indonesia, spent a few days with her, and then flew to Australia to continue his Pacific trek

=== Episode Six: Australia and New Zealand ===
Palin begins in Darwin, where he catches a truck down to Katherine. There, he visits a crocodile farm and helps hatch a few eggs. (Palin wanted the camera to focus on the fact he held a baby crocodile in his hands for five seconds.) Nearby, he checks out an animal rehabilitation centre. Down to King's Creek, he participates in an exciting camel hunt which results in Palin actually getting one. Down to Alice Springs, he catches the Ghan train down to Adelaide, where he participates in the Desperate and Dateless Ball. Then he takes part in a cow race, where he finishes second. In Sydney, he makes a cameo appearance in the soap opera Home and Away.

On to Auckland, New Zealand, he catches a train down to the town of Kaikōura. There he participates in a Māori acceptance ceremony where he spoke and sang a song he learned at Shrewsbury. Palin then travels to Aoraki / Mount Cook and Queenstown for lessons in mountaineering and rafting. He then watches bungee jumping and chats with A. J. Hackett, who developed the sport. Palin then ventures south to the University of Otago in Dunedin, where he is caught in the middle of orientation-week activities. Palin has now reached the halfway point—at least on land—around the Pacific.

=== Episode Seven: Chile and Bolivia ===
Starting the second half of his journey at Cape Horn, Palin views the end of the continent of South America. He travels through the southern islands of Chile to the town of Punta Arenas. He renews acquaintances with his guide from Pole to Pole and the statue of Ferdinand Magellan with the Indian whose toe he kissed to ensure a safe journey. Venturing through the islands, he views the Torres del Paine National Park and the grave of an English explorer who committed suicide in the area. At Chiloe Island, he chats with an American transplant who discusses the possible existence of witches on the island. Then he attends a local barbecue that included dancing and Palin attempting to play the horse's jawbone. North to Santiago, he observes a memorial to victims of the 1973 coup d'état. He flies to the remote Juan Fernández Islands, which were the inspiration behind the Robinson Crusoe novel. Driving through the Atacama Desert, Palin reaches the highest elevation of his life thus far. At the world's largest copper mine in Chuquicamata, Palin does the honours of counting down to the detonation of a mining blast. In the northern town of Arica, he catches a one-car train to La Paz in Bolivia. Things go smoothly until, as they are within striking distance of La Paz, the train has a freakish derailment. After several attempts to get the train back on line, they are successful and eventually reach the Bolivian capital in the black of night.

=== Episode Eight: Bolivia and Peru ===
At the town of Copacabana, Palin visits with reed boat makers on the shores of Lake Titicaca. Crossing the border into Peru, he chats with a lady who hopes to get the Yavari, a century-old ship, sailing again. On to Cuzco, he arrives in the middle of the Feast of Corpus Christi. He then journeys to the Inca Empire's lost city of Machu Picchu, and visits a nearby village of Inca descendants. He then catches a train to Quillabamba, and then moves on to Kiteni, where he meets a local pub owner who agrees to go up the Urubamba River with him. After a day or two consisting of sailing and birdwatching, they reach the canyon of Pongo de Mainique. Soon thereafter, they stop and set up camp for the night. Palin later states that Pongo de Mainique was his favourite place to travel in the world.

=== Episode Nine: Peru and Colombia ===
Palin and his guide approach a Machiguenga village where the feast of St. John the Baptist is going on. Palin observes men's and women's intervillage football matches. Then he samples a drink made from the yucca plant. Back on the Urubamba, Palin eventually makes it to the northern town of Iquitos. Here, there is a barrio that contains many shops. Palin visits one where a lady is making cigarettes. He then takes his first puff of a cigarette in a long while. After a little wait, Palin realises a dream by catching a boat on to the Amazon River.

Bogotá, Colombia, is described by Palin as "trading one jungle for another." With a guide, he discovers why the Colombian capital is one of the most dangerous places on earth. He learns that most of the trouble stems from the drug trafficking in the country. He then travels down Bullet Street, arguably the most violent street in the city. Here, rocks are thrown at the car Palin and his guide are travelling in. He then offers to take him to lunch; however, his guide declines, stating that the restaurant he is going to is owned by the father of a drug trafficker. Palin, however, continues, and is granted an interview (in Spanish) with horse breeder and close friend of Pablo Escobar, Don Fabio Ochoa, who at one point was the father of 3 men on the FBI's 10 most wanted list. Continuing north, he visits an emerald mine and some of the workers there. Then, it is on to Cartagena, where he hops on a party bus, celebrating the end of his nine weeks on the South American continent.

=== Episode Ten: Mexico, Western USA, Canada and Alaska ===
In Mexico City, Palin attends a lucha libre match and listens to a lively mariachi band. The next day, he observes the darker side of the city, as a graffiti protest is being led by a lucha libre wrestler named Superbarrio. On to a small village outside of Querétaro, he helps a lady make tortillas. He then catches a bus to the town of Tijuana, where after observing a house in the shape of a woman, he walks to the United States–Mexico border, known as the "Tortilla Curtain". Here he observes illegal immigrants "Pollos" attempting to enter the United States and evade the Border Patrol. Afterward, Palin crosses the border legally into San Diego and gets a glimpse of the border from the American perspective.

Venturing north to Los Angeles, he gets a bird's-eye view of the city from a local news helicopter reporter. He then becomes involved in a breaking story of a plane approaching Van Nuys Airport landing on the freeway. Driving along the California coast, he reaches San Francisco and the Golden Gate Bridge. He then takes a tour of Alcatraz prison and chats with two former inmates. Then he visits The Castro, known for its homosexual population. Palin's guide introduces him to a local gay policeman and then shows him the place where The NAMES Project originated in 1987. From San Francisco, he flies to Seattle, where he tests a flight simulator at Boeing headquarters.

In Canada, Palin manages to flag down a train near Vancouver, British Columbia. In the nearby town of Squamish, he is the guest of honour at a loggers sports festival, where he takes part in one of the races. Taking a train north through to Prince George, he realises that the closer he gets to completing the circle, his transportation options dwindle. On Day 245 of the journey, he reaches Wales Beach, the westernmost point on the North American mainland. However, Little Diomede is still 25 miles away. Then the Coast Guard comes to pick him up and put him on a boat that will attempt to get him there. The weather does not co-operate, and the Coast Guard abandons the attempt. Even though Palin came up two miles short, he believes, in a way, he did close the circle.

In the DVD interview, Palin said that it was somewhat fitting the circle was not closed, referencing his inability to enter the Reform Club at the end of Around the World in 80 Days and not making it aboard the Agulhas ship to sail to Antarctica in Pole to Pole.

== Broadcast history ==
The first episode of Full Circle was scheduled for 31 August 1997 at 8:00 pm on BBC1. However, due to the death of Diana, Princess of Wales in the early hours of the morning, it was moved to BBC2 at the same time, to allow rolling news coverage to continue on BBC1. The week after, instead of showing the second episode as originally scheduled, BBC1 repeated the first episode for viewers who may have missed it, with all subsequent episodes delayed a week from their intended broadcast date.

== Reception ==
DVD Talk gave a highly positive review. The A.V. Club recommended that viewers read the companion book to get the full picture.
