= Tomohiro's Railway Tour of China =

- Presented by: Tomohiro Sekiguchi
- Opening theme: "Something with Light", by Yurika Ōyama
- Country of origin: Japan

Production
- Production location: Various cities throughout Mainland China
- Running time: 10 minutes

Original release
- Network: NHK

Tomohiro's Railway Tour of China (関口知宏の中国鉄道大紀行) was a travel documentary series, produced by Japanese public broadcaster NHK and broadcast on television, both nationally and internationally by NHK's networks. A live relay from China aired every Sunday at 12:00pm, followed by a 10-minute digest edition - a new edition airing Monday through Friday at 12:00pm. The host of the program was Tomohiro Sekiguchi, an actor by profession.

== Concept ==
Sekiguchi takes on the challenge of traveling 36,000 kilometers (about 22,369 miles) by railway throughout China. The route was designed using computer software, such that the route is an unbroken line, and not a single part of the route crosses another part of the same route.

The trip is broken into two editions: Spring and Fall. In the Spring edition, Sekiguchi's trip begins by flying from Japan to Lhasa in Tibet, and ends in Xi'an - with a distance of 17,000 km. The Fall edition continues the journey, and ends with a combined 36,000 km traveled.
