= Full Circle: The Photographs =

1997 book by Basil Pao

Full Circle - The Photographs
- Hardcover first edition, 1997, BBC Books
- Author: Basil Pao
- Language: English
- Genre: Travel photography
- Publisher: BBC Books
- Publication date: 1997
- Publication place: United Kingdom
- Media type: Print (Hardback)
- Pages: 192
- ISBN: 0-563-37168-4
- OCLC: 37970929

Full Circle – The Photographs is a large coffee-table style book containing pictures taken by Basil Pao, who was the stills photographer on the team that made the Full Circle with Michael Palin TV programme for the BBC.

Michael Palin's name is prominently displayed on the cover, and he has contributed a two-page Introduction.

The rest of the book consists of Basil Pao's photographs, each with a short text indicating what the picture is about and where it was taken. Some of the pictures are displayed as impressive two-page spreads.

Unlike the other three photography books made by Basil Pao in connection with the Michael Palin trips, this one does not present the pictures in chronological order. Instead, there is a 40-page section simply called "Land", and a 130-page section simply called "People". Within each section it appears that Basil Pao choose pictures with similar or contrasting subjects to place together.
