= Blues and Twos (TV series) =

British television documentary (1993–98)

- Genre: Documentary
- Narrated by: Laurie Mayer
- Theme music composer: Mark Dyson and Michael Groth
- Country of origin: United Kingdom
- Original language: English
- No. of series: 4
- No. of episodes: 32 (1 pilot)

Production
- Executive producer: Ivan Rendall
- Producer: John Pettman
- Running time: 30 minutes
- Production companies: Zenith North; Carlton Television

Original release
- Network: ITV
- Release: 22 November 1993 – 5 March 1998

Blues and Twos is a documentary series following the work of Britain's emergency services. It aired on ITV between 22 November 1993 and 5 March 1998 and was produced by Carlton Television and Zenith North.

== Production ==
Executive producer Ivan Rendall explains the idea behind the series:

Above all, the idea was to show the reality of people whose working lives are spent in dangerous circumstances, and to do so without sanitising what they actually do (…) by making it real, the audience could see them for the very special kind of people they are.

A pilot episode was created in 1993, featuring the team from the London Helicopter Emergency Medical Service (HEMS) as they responded to casualties in the aftermath of the Bishopsgate bombing.

To capture the action up close, a solo cameraman accompanied the rescue teams. Cameras were also mounted on and inside vehicles, and workers wore body-mounted cameras, marking a first for this type of documentary.

Originally the programme had been commissioned by Carlton for transmission in the London area but the ITV network decided to air it nationally. The opening episode gained 12.25 million viewers, higher than anticipated. From there the first series of seven episodes was commissioned, covering the work of a variety of emergency services across the country.

== Series overview ==
Series	Episodes	Originally released	
Series	Episodes	First released	Last released
Pilot		22 November 1993	
1	7	8 September 1994	27 October 1994
2	7	11 January 1996	29 February 1996
3	7	13 January 1997	24 February 1997
4	10	1 January 1998	5 March 1998

== Episodes ==
=== Pilot (1993) ===
Title	Original release date
"Medevac"	22 November 1993
London's HEMS team Doctor Karen Heath with paramedics Alan Norman and Lester Bernard are busy tackling a series of 999 calls when the Bishopsgate bomb blast rocks their control room in the city centre.

=== Series 1 (1994) ===
Episodes aired on ITV on Thursdays at 20:30.

No. overall	No. in season	Title	Original release date
1	1	"Stay on the Line"	8 September 1994
Paramedics Brenda Blood and Maurice Foster of Derbyshire Ambulance Service speed to the scene of an explosion in a terraced house, and treat a woman who had fallen from a window.
2	2	"Green Watch"	15 September 1994
Firefighters from Manchester's Thompson Street fire station respond to a fire in a block of flats, a derelict building fire and a suspected arson attack.
3	3	"Tango 476"	22 September 1994
On the streets of Wearside, Northumbria Police traffic cops Brian English and Simon Pawsey respond to a drugs bust before attempting to comfort a potential suicide victim, unaware he may be armed.
4	4	"On Scene"	6 October 1994
Paramedics Derek Young and Steve Watkins respond to 999 medical emergency calls throughout Edinburgh with a calm presence and a touch of humour.
5	5	"D Day"	13 October 1994
Gosport and Fareharms inshore rescue service deal with drama in the waters of the Solent.
6	6	"Solo One"	20 October 1994
London Ambulance Service motorcycle paramedics deal with an attempted suicide under a Tube train.
7	7	"India Juliet"	27 October 1994
The Coastguard helicopter teams at Lee-on-Solent respond to the crew of a Chinese container ship who need to be winched to safety as their vessel sinks after a collision.

=== Series 2 (1996) ===
Episodes aired on ITV on Thursdays at 20:30.

No. overall	No. in season	Title	Original release date
8	1	"Around Midnight"	11 January 1996
It's New Year's Eve in Edinburgh and the Scottish Ambulance Service along with the staff of the Royal Infirmary deal with the aftermath of the new year festivities.
9	2	"Make Pumps Five"	18 January 1996
Ronnie Booth and his team of firefighters from Gerrards Cross in Buckinghamshire break into a house after neighbours see smoke, and rescue a driver from an overturned lorry.
10	3	"Taking Bricks"	25 January 1996
Inspector Adam Briggs and the special rapid response community project team tackle incidents in Chapletown, one of the worst drug related crime areas in West Yorkshire.
11	4	"East-AM 123"	1 February 1996
Belfast ambulance crews respond on one of the busiest days in the city – 12 July, the day of the Orange Parades. Among the cases is a pensioner who collapses but the drama begins when his heart stops.
12	5	"Hotel 900"	8 February 1996
Sussex police air operations unit deal with incidents over a busy bank holiday weekend, including a road traffic accident and searching for an elderly man that's gone missing.
13	6	"On Scene"	22 February 1996
Two officers from Thames Valley Police rapid response unit respond to a variety of emergency calls.
14	7	"Ace of Clubs"	29 February 1996
The helicopter search and rescue team from Squadron 771 at Culdrose race against time to aid a seaman in distress and search for a missing two-year-old girl.

=== Series 3 (1997) ===
Episodes aired on ITV on Mondays at 20:30.

No. overall	No. in season	Title	Original release date
15	1	"196 Emergency Message"	13 January 1997
Mersey Regional Ambulance Service paramedics Dave Sullivan and Leigh Thompson deal with a 5-year-old boy who fell off a table trying to catch a glimpse of the Liverpool FC returning heroes parade.
16	2	"Helimed 181"	20 January 1997
Cornwall Air Ambulance paramedics John Pollard and Dave Pascoe help people during the busy holiday season, including a broken leg, a collapse and breathing difficulties.
17	3	"Level Two"	27 January 1997
Armed response officers from Merseyside Police are seen tackling the rise in gun related crime in the region.
18	4	"Lifebikes"	3 February 1997
Derbyshire ambulance motorbike paramedic Dave Skinner helps a distressed elderly couple who have found their 86-year-old neighbour collapsed, and treats a young mother with a possible spinal cord injury.
19	5	"Dawn Raiders"	10 February 1997
Cameras follow Northumbria Police on dawn raids aimed at curbing the activities of criminals in the run up to Christmas.
20	6	"November 232"	17 February 1997
Leicestershire Fire and Rescue Service tackle an office block blaze, a possible disaster in a backstreet garage and a busy tour of duty during the school holidays.
21	7	"The Night D"	24 February 1997
Midlands CID officer Kirk Dawes is showcased as he works the night shift dealing with multiple cases.

=== Series 4 (1998) ===
Episodes aired on ITV on Thursdays at 20:30.

No. overall	No. in season	Title	Original release date
22	1	"Mike 6-4"	1 January 1998
Kent Air Ambulance paramedics Kelvin Dixon and Shane Williams deal with a man with a crushed hand, a football injury and a motorist buried under a 40-tonne truck.
23	2	"One Under"	8 January 1998
London Ambulance service motorbike paramedic Guy Dunk literally has to put his life on the line to rescue a man trapped under a Tube train – a callout known as a "one under".
24	3	"T.W.O.C."	15 January 1998
Humberside Vehicle Crime unit officers Sean Dixon and Dave Hardacre are constantly on the lookout for vehicles taken without their owners consent in their specially modified Escort Cosworth.
25	4	"Celtic One Three"	22 January 1998
Paramedics Linda Mann and Neil Upritchard rely on the help of police motorcyclists to get an injured girl to hospital.
26	5	"The Men in the Middle"	29 January 1998
The men of the Northern Ireland Fire Service have to tell a worried mother her son has been injured in an accident where raging fires have once again the men in the middle of unfolding danger.
27	6	"Carriageway Chaos"	5 February 1998
Berkshire rapid response paramedic Mark Gatfield starts his day dealing with a bus and truck collision on the M4 while his colleague Ian Teague helps an 87-year-old man.
28	7	"Rescue 122"	12 February 1998
The RAF rescue helicopter of 22 Squadron respond to a girl in trouble on the slopes of Snowdonia, and a father and son whose day out in a boat turns to disaster.
29	8	"Echo Bravo 1-1"	19 February 1998
It's Halloween and for police officers Julie Edmunds and Sue Harrison of Barry in South Wales, the pranks and false call-outs are beyond a joke as well as dealing with troublesome teens.
30	9	"BASICS"	26 February 1998
This episode looks at the work of BASICS, the British Association of Immediate Care Schemes, in East Anglia where GPs respond in their own cars to medical emergencies.
31	10	"Uniform Bravo"	5 March 1998
The last in the documentary series on the work of the emergency services follows the West Midlands Police Operational Support Unit, which operates day or night on the outskirts of Birmingham.

== Awards and nominations ==
The British Academy Television Awards are presented in an annual award show hosted by the BAFTA. They have been awarded annually since 1955.

Year	Category	Nominee	Result	Ref.
1995	Best Sound Factual	Bob Jackson; Colin Hobson	Nominated	
1997	Best Sound Factual	Bob Jackson; Chris Pancott; Steve Blincoe	Won	

== Bibliography ==
- Rendall, Ivan (1995). Blues & Twos. Little, Brown & Company. ISBN 0-316-87672-0.
