= Travel + Leisure =

Travel magazine based in New York City

- Cover of the April 2013 issue
- Editor-in-Chief: Jacqui Gifford
- Frequency: Monthly
- Total circulation: 955,897 (2024)
- First issue: 1937
- Company: People Inc.
- Country: United States
- Based in: New York City
- Language: English
- Website: travelandleisure.com
- ISSN: 0041-2007

Travel + Leisure is an American travel magazine based in New York City. Published 12 times a year, it has 4.8 million readers, according to its corporate media kit. It is published by People Inc., a subsidiary of IAC, with trademark rights belonging to Travel + Leisure Co., a timeshare company that licenses its trademark to IAC.

== History ==
Initially published in 1937 as U.S. Camera and Travel, the magazine later assumed the name Travel + Leisure in 1971. The predecessor titles focused on travel photography. Still, the name change signaled a shift toward travel coverage in general.

The magazine specializes in leisure travel and often features articles written by novelists, poets, artists, designers, and non-travel journalists. It is known for its travel photography and covers featuring models lounging in upscale environments.

Its World's Best Awards, an annual reader survey rating airports, cities, cruise ships, hotels, and islands, have been announced every August since 1995. Votes added by the magazine's readers are taken into consideration to recognize and give out the awards. Other annual features include the T+L 500, a list of the world's top 500 hotels, and America's Favorite Cities, where readers rank U.S. cities in different categories.

Travel + Leisure magazine was purchased from American Express Publishing by Time Inc. (which would later be acquired by Meredith Corporation) on October 1, 2013.

In 2021, Wyndham Destinations acquired Travel + Leisure from Meredith Corporation. The Travel + Leisure magazine is published independently by People Inc. under a long-term license agreement.

== International editions ==
Current and defunct international editions:

- Travel + Leisure Australia (launched 1986, ceased 1987 and then launched October 2005 and ceased December 2009)
- Travel + Leisure China (launched October 2005)
- Travel + Leisure Mexico (launched October 2002)
- Travel + Leisure Russia (launched September 2003, defunct as of late 2007)
- Travel + Leisure Turkey (launched April 2005, defunct as of March 2016)
- Travel + Leisure Southeast Asia (launched December 2007)
- Travel + Leisure South Asia (launched September 2006)
- Travel + Leisure India (launched January 2008)
