= Around the World in 20 Years =

2008 British television travel documentary programme

- Starring: Michael Palin
- Country of origin: United Kingdom
- No. of episodes: 1

Production
- Running time: 60 min

Original release
- Network: BBC One
- Release: 30 December 2008

Around the World in 20 Years (Also known as Around the World in 80 Days – 20 Years On) is a BBC television travel documentary first broadcast in December 2008, presented by Michael Palin. It follows him as he retraces the Dubai – Mumbai leg of his journey Around the World in 80 Days with Michael Palin. Also featured is his reunion with the captain and crew of the al-Shama dhow, in which he had undertaken the journey 20 years ago. Palin finds the captain of the al-Shama in Gujarat and is heartily welcomed. He also reunites with several of the surviving crew members and discovers several of them have since died, including the old man whom he'd let listen to Bruce Springsteen on his Walkman during the voyage. The captain also reveals that the al-Shama was lost at sea in the Indian Ocean a few months before when it was being towed for repairs. Several of the other crew members arrive after Palin and they all gather round Palin's portable DVD player to watch some of the original broadcast. The captain reveals that he had seen the miniseries when it was shown on BBC. The documentary ends with a shot of Palin and the crew members happily sharing a hammam.

A Special 20th Anniversary Edition of the Around the World... book was also published, titled Around the World in 80 days – Revisited, which incorporated pictures from, as well as an account of, this journey.
