= Inside Himalaya =

2004 book by Basil Pao

- Hardcover first edition, 2004, Weidenfeld & Nicolson
- Author: Basil Pao
- Language: English
- Genre: Travel photography
- Publisher: Weidenfeld & Nicolson
- Publication date: 2004
- Publication place: United Kingdom
- Media type: Print (Hardback)
- Pages: 200
- ISBN: 0-297-84370-2
- OCLC: 62263918

Inside Himalaya is a large coffee-table style book containing pictures taken by Basil Pao, who was the stills photographer on the team that made the Himalaya with Michael Palin TV programme for the BBC.

Michael Palin's name is prominently displayed on the cover, and he has contributed a two-page foreword.

The rest of the book consists of Basil Pao's photographs, each with a short text indicating what the picture is about and where it was taken. Some of the pictures are displayed as impressive two-page spreads. A majority of the pictures show the local people, some as informal portraits, some showing people engaged in various activities. The rest of the pictures are beautiful landscapes, many showing the majestic mountainous scenery.

There are pictures from the following countries: Pakistan, India, Nepal, Tibet, China, Bhutan and Bangladesh.

At the end of the book, there are four pages showing 42 very small pictures that provide some insights into how the BBC film crew did their work. There is also a three-page Postscript by Basil Pao describing his very personal experiences during the Himalaya trip.
