= Inside Sahara =

2002 book by Basil Pao

- Hardcover first edition, 2002, Weidenfeld & Nicolson
- Author: Basil Pao
- Language: English
- Genre: Travel photography
- Publisher: Weidenfeld & Nicolson
- Publication date: 2002
- Publication place: United Kingdom
- Media type: Print (Hardback)
- Pages: 200
- ISBN: 0-297-84304-4
- OCLC: 50100793
- Dewey Decimal: 916.6/0022/2 22
- LC Class: DT333 .P33 2001

Inside Sahara is a large coffee-table style book containing pictures taken by Basil Pao, who was the stills photographer on the team that made the Sahara with Michael Palin TV programme for the BBC.

Michael Palin's name is prominently displayed on the cover, and he has contributed a two-page Introduction.

The rest of the book consists of Basil Pao's photographs, each with a short text indicating what the picture is about and where it was taken. Some of the pictures are displayed as impressive two-page spreads. A majority of the pictures show the local people, some as informal portraits, some showing people engaged in various activities. The rest of the pictures are beautiful landscapes, many depicting the harsh yet fascinating desert.

The book is divided into the following 11 sections: Morocco, Algeria (West), Western Sahara, Mauritania, Senegal, Mali, Niger, Algeria (Centre), Libya, Tunisia and Algeria (North).

There is also a two-page foreword by Basil Pao, and there are 12 pages that contain 78 very small pictures that provide some insights into how the BBC film crew did their work.
