= Sam Wood (archaeologist) =

British archaeologist and TV presenter

Sam Wood is an archaeologist TV Presenter who presented the BBC documentary 'On Hannibal's Trail'.

== Works ==
Sam Wood presented his first documentary for the BBC in 2010. On Hannibal's Trail is a history and travel BBC television series in which three Australian brothers - Danny, Ben and Sam Wood - set out cycling on the trail of Hannibal, the Carthaginian general who marched from Spain to Rome at the head of an invading army accompanied by elephants.

The series was first shown on BBC Four in July 2010, and later repeated on BBC HD and BBC Two. In 2012 it was sold to the National Geographic Channel and ViaSat is now being shown worldwide.
