= Hemingway Adventure (book) =

1999 book by Michael Palin

Michael Palin's Hemingway Adventure
- Hardcover first edition
- Author: Michael Palin
- Language: English
- Series: Michael Palin's Trips
- Genre: Travel literature
- Publisher: Weidenfeld & Nicolson
- Publication date: 1999
- Publication place: United Kingdom
- Media type: Print (Hardback & Paperback)
- Pages: 256
- ISBN: 0-297-82528-3
- OCLC: 43188514
- Preceded by: Full Circle
- Followed by: Sahara

Michael Palin's Hemingway Adventure is the book that Michael Palin wrote to accompany the BBC TV programme Michael Palin's Hemingway Adventure.

This book, like the other books that Michael Palin wrote following each of his seven trips for the BBC, consists both of his text and of many photographs to illustrate the trip. All of the pictures in this book were taken by Basil Pao, the stills photographer who was part of the team who made the trip.

The idea behind this trip was to visit all of the places where Ernest Hemingway had lived and traveled and visited. Michael Palin tried also to meet some people who had known Hemingway, and to do some of the things Hemingway had done.

The book contains eight chapters: Chicago/Michigan, Italy, Paris, Spain, Key West, Africa, Cuba, and American West. The material follows Ernest Hemingway's life in chronological order, except that some chapters, for example Africa, cover several visits to the same place at different times in Hemingway's life. (This is somewhat different from the associated TV program, which makes almost no attempt to follow Hemingway's life chronologically.)

The book also contains a three-page Introduction, a two-page world map showing the far-flung locations associated with Hemingway, and a two-page tabular summary of Hemingway's life.

Michael Palin starts the book by telling of his own introduction to Hemingway's writing, reading A Farewell to Arms, For Whom the Bell Tolls, and The Old Man and the Sea when he was only 13 years old. But a fascination with Hemingway's authorship is not necessary to appreciate this trip, as it can be simply considered to be an exciting trip following in the footsteps of an exciting person.

The trip was done in 1999, 100 years after Hemingway's birth in 1899.

The text of this book is available free to read online on Michael Palin's official web site.

== Audio edition ==
This book is available as an unabridged audiobook, read by Michael Palin and lasts 6 hours 15 minutes.
