= Robin Esrock =

South African-born Canadian travel writer

Robin Esrock (/ˈɛzrɒk/ EZ-rok; born 1974 in Johannesburg, South Africa) is a travel writer, bestselling author and international television personality. Based in Vancouver, British Columbia, Esrock has written articles for major international publications, including the Chicago Tribune, The Guardian, Gulf News, South China Morning Post, Cape Town Argus, Sydney Morning Herald, Vancouver Sun, Dallas Morning News and the Toronto Star.

Esrock was a regular columnist for the Globe & Mail, MSN, the Vancouver Sun and Outpost Magazine. Other publication credits include Canadian Geographic, Mental Floss, Red Bull's The Red Bulletin and National Geographic.

Esrock is co-host of the 40-part TV series Word Travels. Filmed in 36 countries, Word Travels follows the lives of two working travel writers. Word Travels is broadcast on Travel Channel International, National Geographic Adventure in Asia, Oceania, the Middle East and Europe, OutsideTV and HalogenTV in the US, and on OLN, F/X and City in Canada. It also aired on streaming service Amazon Prime Video and Tubi. Esrock met his co-host and fellow travel writer Julia Dimon while backpacking in Köyceğiz, Turkey. Esrock is also the co-creator, co-developer, associate producer and co-writer of Word Travels. In 2012, production commenced on the OLN TV series Get Stuffed, based on an original idea by Esrock.

Prior to his career as a travel writer, Esrock worked in the music industry for SL Feldman & Associates. His career shift was the result of a bike accident that left him with a broken kneecap and a $20,000 insurance settlement. Using this money, he backpacked around the world, writing a column for the Vancouver Sun and maintaining his website.

Esrock has reportedly travelled to over 110 countries on seven continents. He is also a public speaker, has hosted various online magazine shows and appeared as a regular travel expert on Vancouver's Breakfast Television. Esrock has also been featured as a travel expert in Forbes Travel, Travel + Leisure, and interviewed in several Canadian and Australian media outlets. In 2013, he won the Destination Canada award for Best Online Video at the Go Media Marketplace Awards in Winnipeg.

In March 2012, Esrock was master of ceremonies at the 108th Annual Explorer's Club Dinner at the Waldorf-Astoria Hotel in New York. Esrock presented awards to Explorer's Club members including palaeontologist Philip J. Currie, marine toxicologist Susan Shaw, and biologist Richard Ellis. Esrock also spoke about the lessons of travel at TEDx Vancouver, selected by Yahoo as one of TED's top travel talks.

In 2013, Esrock released his book The Great Canadian Bucket List: One-of-a-Kind Travel Experiences, published by Dundurn Press. The book became the number one selling Canadian travel and Canadian history title on Amazon.ca. In 2015, he published five follow-up books in the Bucket List series. Esrock has cited Hunter S. Thompson and Gonzo journalism as major influences in his writing, and sports the gonzo fist tattoo on left leg.

In 2015, Esrock was named one of Gear Junkie's Outdoor Ambassadors, a list of adventurers, inventors and athletes from the past 110 years who made a difference. The list also includes Ernest Shackleton, Eddie Bauer, Robert Baden-Powell, GoPro inventor Nick Woodman and Steve Irwin.

In 2016, HarperCollins published Esrock's The Great Global Bucket List in North America, and Affirm Press published it in Australia. The book follows Esrock's adventures to 75 countries in search of extraordinary experiences. With positive reviews, Travel+Leisure called Esrock the King of the Bucket List. It entered the Toronto Star Non-Fiction Bestseller List at Number 9.

In 2017, Dundurn Press published a second edition of The Great Canadian Bucket List, which entered the Toronto Star Canadian non-fiction book chart at number 5. Esrock also became a Fellow of The Royal Canadian Geographic Society. As a brand ambassador, Robin has worked with Ford, Intercontinental Hotels Group, Jetstar, and Great Canadian Trails. Esrock frequently appears on CBC Radio as a travel expert.

In 2018, Esrock travelled across Australia to write The Great Australian Bucket List, which was published by Affirm Press. Esrock was profiled on ABC Morning News, 9News and wrote about his adventures for the Melbourne Herald Sun, and other publications. The Great Australian Bucket List was long-listed for the Australian Indie Book Awards.

In 2019, Affirm Press published Esrock's book about family travel in Australia, 75 Places to Take the Kids (Before They Don't Want to Go). The book received positive coverage in Australian media. Returning to Canada, he continued to write for various publications and be profiled in major media.

In 2021, Esrock began writing a bi-weekly column for Canadian Geographic. He also became a Royal Canadian Geographic Travel Ambassador.

In 2023, Esrock was nominated by the Tourism Industry Association of Canada as its Travel Media Professional of the Year. Esrock also won a First Place Award from the Society of American Travel Writers.

He lives in Vancouver, British Columbia.
