= Word Travels =

Television series

- Created by: Robin Esrock, Julia Dimon, Heather Hawthorn-Doyle
- Starring: Robin Esrock; Julia Dimon
- Country of origin: Canada
- No. of seasons: 3
- No. of episodes: 40

Production
- Executive producers: Heather Hawthorn-Doyle, Brian Hamilton
- Producers: Leah Kimura, Caroline Manuel
- Running time: 24 minutes

Original release
- Network: OLN; National Geographic Adventure
- Release: January 30, 2008 – present

Word Travels (tagline The Truth Behind the Byline) is an adventure travel television documentary series. An original Canadian production, the show debuted on OLN on January 30, 2008 and originally aired in Canada on OLN and Citytv, and worldwide on National Geographic Adventure. The show was co-hosted by Robin Esrock and Julia Dimon, produced by Omni Film Limited, and primarily filmed by Sean Cable.

The first season of Word Travels aired on OLN in Canada and began airing internationally on the National Geographic Adventure channel worldwide in October 2008. The second season began airing on OLN on January 18, 2009, and aired on National Geographic Adventure in September 2009. Season 3 was filmed between April and October 2009, and debuted in Canada on OLN on March 7, 2010. It airs on Travel Channel (UK) in 21 languages around the world.

== Overview ==
Word Travels follows the lives of two young professional travel writers, South African Robin Esrock and Toronto-based Julia Dimon, as they travel to random places in search of stories to write about and file for their editors. It is the first TV show about modern travel writing. Robin Esrock was a regular columnist for The Globe and Mail and freelances for newspapers and magazines worldwide. Julia Dimon was a weekly columnist for the Metro International's Canadian edition. Esrock's coverage focuses on physical stories, while Dimon places more focus on cultural stories. Each episode has the characters investigating a story.
