= Michael Palin's New Europe =

2007 British television travel documentary series

- Written by: Michael Palin
- Presented by: Michael Palin
- Theme music composer: Andre Jacquemin; Dave Howman
- Composers: Molly Nyman; Harry Escott
- Country of origin: United Kingdom
- Original language: English
- No. of series: 1
- No. of episodes: 7

Production
- Running time: 55–60 minutes
- Production company: Prominent Television production

Original release
- Network: BBC One
- Release: 16 September – 28 October 2007

Related
- Himalaya with Michael Palin; Brazil with Michael Palin

Michael Palin's New Europe is a travel documentary presented by Michael Palin and first aired in the UK on the BBC on 16 September 2007 and in the US on the Travel Channel on 28 January 2008. Palin visits 20 countries in Central and Eastern and Southeast Europe – the programme was filmed in the wake of the 2004 enlargement of the European Union (and shortly before the 2007 enlargement), which included many of the countries visited by Palin and significantly reshaped east–west relations on the continent. The filming was done in 2006 and early 2007 using HD (high definition) equipment. The result was made into seven one-hour programmes for BBC One and simulcast on BBC HD. A book, New Europe, was also written describing the trip, and illustrated with photographs by Basil Pao.

== Episodes ==
The series consists of seven one-hour episodes:

Number	UK title	US title	Countries visited
1	War and Peace	Across the Iron Curtain	Slovenia (briefly), Croatia, Bosnia and Herzegovina, Serbia and Albania
2	Eastern Delight	From the Rila Mountains to Cappodocia	Republic of Macedonia (briefly), Bulgaria and Turkey
3	Wild East	From the Dniestr to the Danube	Transnistria (briefly), Moldova and Romania; Palin celebrated Transnistrian National Day, met a Moldovan self-sufficient old woman, worked with Romanian lumberjacks, interviewed Romanian tennis player Ilie Năstase and visited Transylvania and Bucharest with its Palace of the Parliament.
4	Danube to Dnieper	Hungary to Yalta	Hungary and Ukraine
5	Baltic Summer	The Baltic States	Estonia, Latvia, Lithuania and Russia (Kaliningrad Oblast); Palin joined in the festivities with some Neopagans.
6	From Pole to Pole	Poland	Poland
7	Journey's End	The End of the Line	Slovakia (briefly), Czech Republic and Germany (former East Germany)

== BBC complaint ==
The first episode of the series received a complaint due to alleged bias about the Bosnian War. The complainant criticised Palin's statement that the destruction of Mostar's Stari Most bridge had no reason, as well as a suggestion that Serbia was "unfairly blamed" for the war. In August 2008, the BBC Trust's editorial standards committee upheld the complaint, saying that the show attempted to show context to its statement about Serbia, but had oversimplified a controversial topic. It also said that the bridge comment was inaccurate as the destruction of the bridge was in order to isolate Bosniaks. The committee rejected part of the complaint, an accusation that the show was impartial because it did not mention the Srebrenica massacre.

In September 2009, Palin told the Royal Television Society that the complainant was allegedly a "serial complainer", adding "The complaint was upheld. That, I believe, brings the BBC into disrepute. I think it was a stupid decision. I felt very, very angry and very let down". When Palin left the BBC for Channel 5 in 2012, he mentioned the upheld complaint as a cause of friction.
