= Superbarrio Gómez =

Mexican "real-life superhero", satirist and organizer

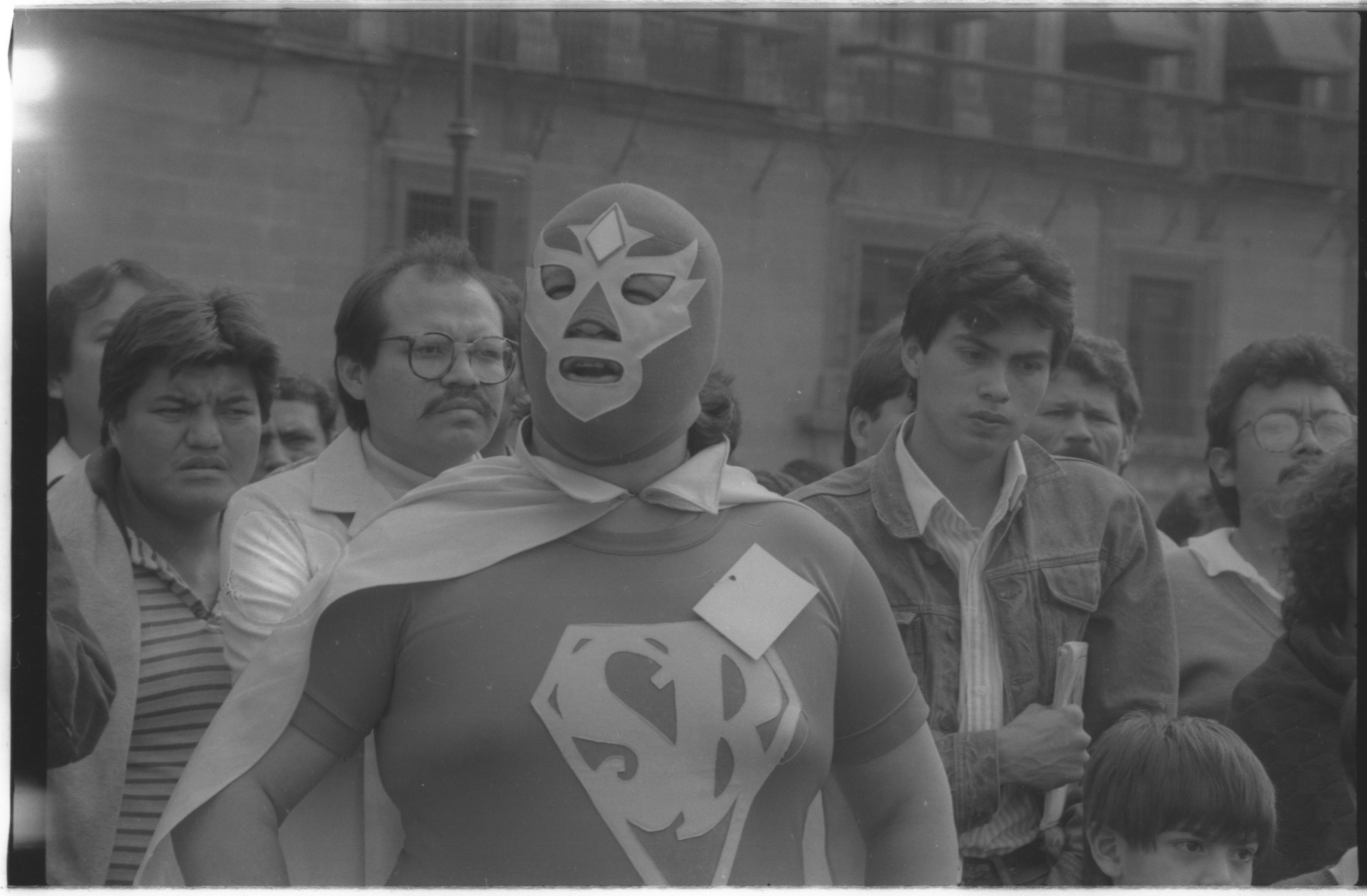
- Gómez in the 1980s
- Occupations: Crimefighter, satirist, political activist
- Honors: Appeared in Crisis #7 and #8

Superbarrio Gómez is a Mexican "real-life superhero", satirist and organizer. Inspired by the Luchador wrestler El Santo, and his social-justice superhero persona in comics and movies, Superbarrio wears red tights and a red and yellow wrestler's mask. Rather than fight crime and corruption with violence, he uses his image to organize labor rallies and protests, and file petitions. Although he has been claimed to be Marco Rascón Córdova, the authorized biography Todos Somos Superbarrio states that although Rascón Córdova, a long-time social activist, did create the character, Marco was never Superbarrio, but it was rather a lesser-known political organizer, who was in turn substituted for a wrestler in the few times he actually fought on the ring.

The character was created in 1987 by Asamblea de Barrios, an organization fighting for affordable housing after the 1985 Mexico City earthquake, which left thousands of homeless. He began with stopping the evictions of families who paid rent. In 1988, he was informally declared candidate for the Mexican 1988 presidential election. He declined in favor of Cuauhtémoc Cárdenas and his Party of the Democratic Revolution which he supported in the following years.

In 1996, Superbarrio declared himself a candidate for the 1996 United States Presidential Election and held mock campaign rallies in the United States and Mexico.

== Appearances ==
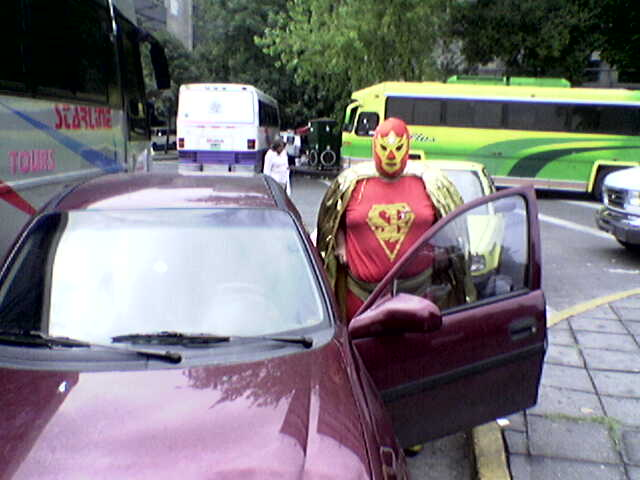
Superbarrio, Mexico City, July 30, 2006

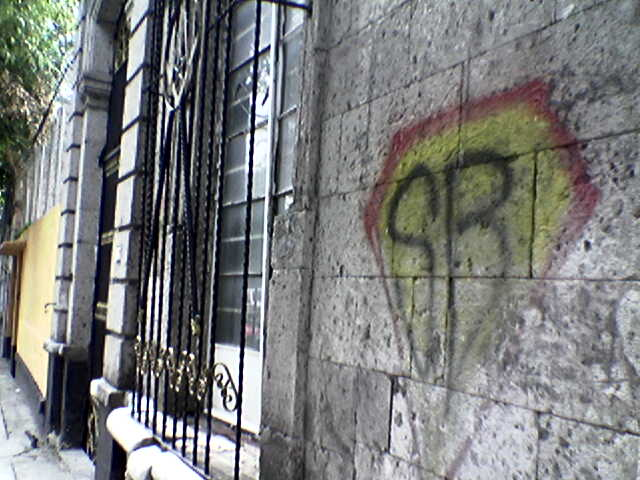
The logo of Superbarrio seen in Mexico City

=== Print ===
Three books have been written about Superbarrio: Todos Somos Superbarrio (We are all Superbarrio) by Mauricio-José Schwarz, De Superman a Superbarrios (From Superman to Superbarrio) by Hans Röeder, and La Ciudad, La Otra by Raúl Batista González.

Superbarrio has appeared in the British comic book series (2000 AD Presents) Crisis #7 and #8. Superbarrio appeared as an activist trying to prevent multi-national corporations from taking advantage of Latin American Third World nations in the Third World War storyline by Pat Mills and Carlos Ezquerra.

=== Film ===
Superbarrio Gómez has appeared in numerous documentaries including Megacities by Michael Glawogger, where he talked about living in Mexico City, and Super Amigos, where Superbarrio and other Mexican luchadores and real life super heroes battle corruption, homophobia, animal exploitation, pollution and poverty in Mexico City.

There is an animated short film called The Return of Super Barrio credited to Plaid and Bob Jaroc; although entirely animated and fictional, it stars Superbarrio as himself.

=== Theatre ===
In 2016, the French theatre company Théâtre13 produced a play in Paris about the eponymous hero, Superbarrio. The play centered around his origin story after he emerged from the Mexico City earthquakes of 1985.
