= On Hannibal's Trail =

Television series

- Genre: History, travel
- Presented by: Danny Wood; Sam Wood; Ben Wood
- Country of origin: United Kingdom
- Original language: English
- No. of series: 1
- No. of episodes: 6

Production
- Executive producer: Chris Granlund
- Producers: Robin Dashwood; Fiona Cushley; Andrea Illescas
- Production locations: Spain; France; Italy; Tunisia
- Cinematography: John Bretherton
- Editors: Mike Duly; Moira Knowles
- Running time: 30 minutes
- Production company: BBC

Original release
- Network: BBC Four
- Release: 19 July – 23 August 2010

On Hannibal's Trail is a history and travel BBC television series in which three Australian brothers – Danny, Ben and Sam Wood – set out cycling on the trail of Hannibal, the Carthaginian general who marched from Spain to Rome at the head of an invading army accompanied by elephants.

The series was first shown on BBC Four in July 2010, and later repeated on BBC HD and BBC Two. In 2012, it was sold to the National Geographic Channel and is now being shown worldwide.

== Episodes ==
1. "Hitting the Road" – 19 July 2010

The brothers hit the road, cycling up the east coast of Spain, passing through the palms of Elche, the beaches of Benidorm and Valencia's zoo before arriving at Sagunto, where Hannibal's war against the Romans truly began. On the way, they meet Australian cycling champion Matthew Lloyd and they talk to the elephants – and their keepers.

1. "Barca! Barca! Barca!" – 26 July 2010
2. "Crossing the Rhone" – 2 August 2010
3. "Over the Alps" – 9 August 2010
4. "Hannibal the Great" – 16 August 2010
5. "Hannibal at the Gates" – 23 August 2010
