= Sahara with Michael Palin =

- DVD cover
- Written by: Michael Palin
- Presented by: Michael Palin
- Country of origin: United Kingdom
- Original language: English
- No. of series: 1
- No. of episodes: 4

Production
- Running time: 50 minutes

Original release
- Network: BBC One
- Release: 13 October – 3 November 2002

Related
- Michael Palin's Hemingway Adventure; Himalaya with Michael Palin

Sahara with Michael Palin is a four-part BBC television series presented by British comedian and travel presenter Michael Palin, and first broadcast on BBC One from 13 October to 3 November 2002. In it, Palin travelled around the Sahara in Northern and Western Africa, meeting people and visiting places. The journey route included the following countries and territories: Gibraltar, Morocco, Western Sahara, Mauritania, Senegal, Mali, Niger, Libya, Tunisia, Algeria and Ceuta, Spain.

These countries/territories and the entire Sahara area are vast. For example, Algeria is four times the size of France or three times the size of Texas. The Sahara is roughly the same size as the United States, and the trip covered 10,000 miles (16,000 kilometres) and lasted three months.

A book by the same name written by Palin was published to accompany the series. This book contained both Palin's text and many pictures by Basil Pao, the stills photographer on the team. Basil Pao also produced a separate book of the photographs he took during the journey, Inside Sahara, a large coffee-table style book printed on glossy paper.

== Episode guide ==
The series consists of four 60-minute episodes, as follows:

=== A Line in the Sand ===
The programme starts in Gibraltar, shown to be a bit of the United Kingdom only a few miles from Africa. In Tangier, Morocco, Palin rides a camel on the beach, and then plays football with some youths and hurts himself. He's somewhat revived by visiting a hammam, a public bath house. He attends a church service at St. Andrew's Anglican Church together with some Nigerians who are trying to gain access to Europe. He also visits Jonathan Dawson, an expatriate Englishman, and his pet cockerel Birdie.

To get to the Sahara it is necessary to travel over the Atlas Mountains. Along the way Palin visits Fez and sees the old-fashioned way to dye leather. Then in Marrakesh, he visits the souk (market). In the mountains near Marrakesh Palin visits a Berber village, experiencing a "courtship dance". Before leaving the mountains he passes through Ait Benhaddou, an old town used as the location for many movies.

Finally having reached the Sahara, in Algeria, Palin visits the Smara refugee camp for people who fled from Western Sahara. A member of the Polisario Front shows him around and he sees their equipment, mainly old Russian tanks. After several days travel, Palin makes it to Mauritania, to the town of Zouerat. From there he takes the iron ore train south to Choûm, then by road on to Atar, where he encounters the Paris – Dakar rally and talks to Dave Hammond, the only remaining British entrant at that point. In the closing credits, Palin says that Hammond had moved up to twelfth position before suffering an injury, from which he slowly recovered.

=== Destination Timbuktu ===
The episode starts with Palin crossing the Sénégal River, leaving Mauritania and entering the town of Saint-Louis in Senegal. He has left Arab Africa and entered Black Africa, and the French influence, from the colonial past, is strongly felt here. He interviews the artist Jacob Yakouba and his soap-opera-star wife Marie-Madeleine, talking to them about polygamy, which is prevalent here. Palin also visits Gorée Island, the main departure point for black slaves sold to America.

Palin moves on to Dakar and watches (and takes part in) a late-night wrestling match, and then talks to the owner of a jazz café. Then he takes the Bamako Express train to Bamako in Mali, talking to a native woman about polygamy along the way. In Bamako he talks to the musician Toumani Diabate.

Palin visits the town of Tirelli on the Bandiagara Escarpment where the Dogon people live. The Dogons are a tribe of people who kept themselves isolated from the rest of the world until fairly recently, and have a culture unlike any other. While with the Dogons, Palin experiences getting gunpowder blown into his face from the Dogon hunter's old blunderbuss, eats a meal in a sweltering 56 degree (134 °F) location, witnesses a funeral dance, and is introduced to the blacksmith, whose secondary job is to circumcise the boys (his wife performs female genital cutting on the girls).

Countries visited during Sahara.

In Djenne, Palin talks to a local man whose nickname is Pigmy and experiences the Muslim Tabaski ritual of slaughtering a sheep, first at the huge mosque and later at Pigmy's house. At the town of Mopti Palin tries to get ferry passage up the Niger River, but the low water level makes this impossible. Taking a smaller and very primitive boat instead, Palin meets Kristin, a Norwegian Christian missionary who has lived in Mali for six years, and they talk about female genital cutting and Kristin's attempts to convert Muslims to Christianity. Then the boat runs aground, and it is unsure if and when Palin will arrive in Timbuktu.

=== Absolute Desert ===
Michael Palin did make it to the mysterious Timbuktu, and this episode opens with views of the famous mosque built of mud. Palin talks to the imam, who shows Palin documents indicating that Muslim scholars had discovered that the Earth circled the Sun at least 100 years before Europeans figured it out.

After this, Palin joins a tribe of Wodaabe nomads on their way to Ingal (in Niger) to participate in the Cure Salée festival. He talks to a young Wodaabe man named Doulla and to Céline, a young French woman who is also following along with the group. The subject of polygamy is again raised, and we see the unusual courting rituals of the Wodaabe. Here the young girls choose the man they would like to try out, while the young men stand in a line dancing and rolling their eyes and looking very feminine (by Western standards) with much makeup.

At Tabelot, Palin visits an oasis, where a camel is used to raise water from a deep well using a long rope and a goatskin bucket. Palin visits the home of Omar and his four wives and 15 children. That evening there is a party before the departure of the camel caravan the next day.

The rest of the episode follows Palin as he follows the camel caravan on its way across the Tenere Desert, which the French had called "absolute desert". There is nothing here but sand, sand, and more sand. Finding a tree is cause for celebration. Palin shares conditions with the camel drivers, walking with them and eating their food. He tries to talk to them, but they speak no English or French, and they end up attempting to teach each other their native languages. "Bottoms up" is a favourite expression. After five days, Palin leaves the camel caravan, to return in the next episode.

=== Dire Straits ===
This episode starts with Palin crossing the border from Niger to Algeria, a desolate border with nothing but sand. A bit north of here are the Hoggar Mountains. At Assekrem he gets up early to view the sunrise from 9,000 ft (2,700 m).

Next, he boards an Algerian passenger plane and flies north to Hassi-Messaoud, an oil extraction and refining town; a man-made luxury oasis in the middle of the desert. From here the trip jumps to Libya, normally closed to western TV crews. To gain entry, Michael Palin and his team have joined up with a British veterans' tour, and he mingles with the 80-year-old former "Desert Rats" who reminisce about the Battle of Tobruk. He also visits Benghazi and the ruins of Apollonia, once a Greek port, and the ruins of Leptis Magna, once a Roman city.

Leaving Libya, Palin arrives in Tunisia. He joins an octopus fishing crew on a small boat at Djerba, visits a family who live in caves at El Haddej (the scene of his crucifixion in Life of Brian) and tries smoking a shisha (a large water pipe) in a café in Sousse. Then it's back to Algeria, travelling along the northern coast. Here the security is so tight (Palin is always accompanied by armed police) that there's not much chance for spontaneity.

The last two days are spent in Ceuta visiting an EU-operated detention facility for Africans trying to reach Europe, and talking to a woman on a Spanish beach about the illegal immigrants who die trying to make it across the "dire straits" to the "promised land". A final shot shows Palin back in Gibraltar, philosophising about the Gibraltar situation (Spain vs. Britain) and the impoverished Third World vs. the rich West.
