= Himalaya with Michael Palin =

2004 British television travel documentary series

- DVD cover
- Genre: Adventure travel Mountaineering
- Starring: Michael Palin
- Country of origin: United Kingdom
- Original language: English
- No. of series: 1
- No. of episodes: 6

Production
- Running time: 300 minutes

Original release
- Network: BBC One
- Release: 3 October – 7 November 2004

Related
- Sahara with Michael Palin; Michael Palin's New Europe

Himalaya with Michael Palin is a 2004 BBC television series presented by comedian and travel presenter Michael Palin. It records his six-month trip around the Himalaya mountain range area. The trip covered only 4,800 km (3,000 miles) horizontally, but involved a lot of vertical travelling, including several treks into the mountains. The highest point attained by Palin was Everest Base Camp at 5,300 metres (17,500 feet).

A book by the same name written by Palin was published to accompany the series. This book contained both Palin's text and many pictures by Basil Pao, the stills photographer on the team. Basil Pao also produced a separate book of the photographs he took during the journey, Inside Himalaya, a large coffee-table style book printed on glossy paper.

== Episode guide ==
The series is divided up into six one-hour episodes

No.	Title	Countries visited	Original release date
1	"North by Northwest"	Pakistan	19 September 2004
Features Khyber Pass, Peshawar, Gilgit, Chitral and K2. Starts from Khyber Pass, riding the Khyber Pass Railway, visiting Darra Adam Khel, touring their cottage firearms workshops meeting in the "Dental Alley", playing cricket in a comic style, meeting one of the last land barons. Riding to Chitral, meeting a madrasah owner, watching polo from its birthplace, a polo game, meets up some Kalash people, watching a polo game and ascending to Concordia, a place near K2.
2	"A Passage to India"	Pakistan and India	26 September 2004
Features Lahore, Amritsar, Shimla, Dharamsala and Srinagar, with a special meeting with the Dalai Lama. Starts from Lahore, watching the closing of the border ceremony, visiting a Sikh town Amritsar, entering the Golden Temple, partaking in a communal meal, staying overnight in a hotel near the temple. Riding a train, visiting Shimla, watching an Indian Army drama, ascending in Srinagar, visiting seemingly declining floating inns, a reminder of the effects of a continuing warfare. Going Dharamshala, meeting with some Tibetan exiles, watching a musical, getting his life cycle, meeting the Dalai Lama and heading the stupas of Ladakh.
3	"Annapurna to Everest"	Nepal and China (Tibet Autonomous Region)	3 October 2004
Features Kathmandu, Pokhara, Annapurna Mountain and the Everest base camp (northern, Chinese side). Includes Palin's meeting with King Gyanendra of Nepal and a scare involving the Maoist rebels. From following a Gurkha recruiting drive, instructors getting kidnapped by Maoists, getting acclimatisation in some stopovers and arriving Annapurna Sanctuary. Descending to Kathmandu, he met King Gyanendra, his close circle, gambling, meeting with Sadhus and watching a death ceremony, along with strolling with a journalist while looking scenes from Kama Sutra. Leaving Nepal, bidding farewell on the guides on the border, travelling to Mount Everest, staying the night with Buddhist nuns and monks, travelling with Yaks and some Tibetans to Mount Everest and reaching the base camp.
4	"The Roof of the World"	China (Tibet Autonomous Region and Qinghai Province)	10 October 2004
Features Lhasa and Yushu. From travelling vast Tibetan plateau, stopping in Shigatse, going to Tashilhunpo monastery, a brief story of the area under British invasion, Gyantse, visiting Lhasa, Potala Palace, visiting a modern Chinese nightclub in Lhasa, a brief history of Chinese invasion of Tibet, helping a reconstruction of the temple, swimming in a hot springs resort and travelling to Namtso Lake. Experiencing a Yak herder firsthand, churning butter tea. Going to Yushu, experiencing a week-long festival, meeting some Tibetans and buying caterpillar fungus, interview with an English speaking Tibetans and traversing the Yangtze river.
5	"Leaping Tigers, Naked Nagas"	China (Yunnan Province) and India (Nagaland State and Assam State)	17 October 2004
Features Kunming, Lijiang, Lugu Lake, the Naga village of Longwa on the Indian-Burmese border and Kaziranga National Park. Includes a trek along Tiger Leaping Gorge. From a trek along Tiger Leaping Gorge, visiting Lugu Lake, meeting Yang Erche Namu and meeting some Mosuo, meeting a Chinese traditional medicine man and going to Lijiang, heading to Naga village in Longwa, Nagaland, meeting some former headhunters and cross-border antics, heading to Assam, meeting with miners and riding trains, in Kaziranga National Park, meets up and experienced a Hindu dance musical, meeting up a former Marxist idealist, taking part in elephant games.
6	"Bhutan to the Bay of Bengal"	Bhutan and Bangladesh	24 October 2004
Features Thimphu, Sylhet, Dhaka and Chittagong. Ends on the Bay of Bengal. This episode was one of the few instances where the media gave attention to the Grameen Bank and Muhammed Yunus's efforts, in the micro-economic scale in Bangladesh before he was awarded the Nobel Prize for it. From Bhutan, hikes the country's National Parks, meeting some nobility and interviewing them, going to a royal bird sanctuary. In Bangladesh, he meet some stone quarry workers, meeting Muhammad Yunus (economist), taking a boat ride to the Dhaka's river delta and ends up having a cruise along the river to the Bay of Bengal. Palin also visits the famous Chittagong Ship Breaking Yard, the largest seagoing vessel dismantling station in the world.

== Reviews ==
In The Guardian, Sam Wollaston praised Palin's quiet presenting and gentle mocking presenting style.
