= Trawlermen (TV series) =

- Genre: Factual
- Directed by: Matt Bennett and Matt Gyves (series 1)
- Narrated by: Ken Stott; Peter Capaldi
- Theme music composer: Carl harms
- Country of origin: United Kingdom
- Original language: English
- No. of series: 4
- No. of episodes: 20

Production
- Executive producer: Jane Merkin (series 1)
- Cinematography: Matt Bennett and Matt Gyves (series 1)
- Editor: Christine Pancott
- Running time: 30–60 minutes

Original release
- Network: BBC One
- Release: 31 July 2006 – 21 July 2010

Trawlermen is a BBC television documentary programme focusing on the work of a number of trawler crews based in Peterhead and Fraserburgh. The programme is narrated by the actors Ken Stott and Peter Capaldi. Four series and a special have been broadcast, totalling 20 episodes. The first series of 5 episodes was first broadcast in 2006 and was stripped across 7.00pm on weekdays. A further 5 episodes were first aired in 2007, 6 in 2008 and a fourth series of 3 episodes in 2009. A special was broadcast in 2010.

The TV stations Blighty, Dave and Watch all repeat some episodes from the programme.

== Boats ==
- Amity 2 – PD 177 – Skipper: Jimmy Buchan
- Ocean Venture 2 – PD 340 – Skippers: John Buchan Snr & John Buchan Jnr
- Arcane – N907 – Skipper: Charlie McBride
- Fruitful Harvest – PD 247 – Skipper: Sandy Watt
- Fruitful Bough – PD 109 – Skipper: James West
- New Dawn – FR 470 – Skippers: Charles "Chaz" Bruce & Martin Bruce
- Ryanwood – FR 307 – Skipper: Kevin West
- Renown – FR 246 – Skipper: James Buchan
- Genesis – BF 505 – Skipper: Alan Watt
- Chloe May – FR 983 – Skipper: John Alexander
- Boy John – INS 110 – Skipper: Andrew McLeman
- Rosebloom – INS 353 – Skipper: Sandy McLeman
- Chris Andra – FR 228 – Skippers: Wilie Tait & Peter Tait
- Viking Monarch – K 58 – Skipper: John Musgrave
- Sunrise – FR 359 – Skipper: John Steven
- Ocean Dawn – FR 347 – Skipper: Ian Ritchie
- Radiant Star – LK 71 – Skipper: Victor Lawrenson
- Heather K – K 77 – Skipper: Heddle Costie
- Starlight – PD 786 – Skipper: James Watt
- Starlight Rays – PD 230 – Skipper: Alec Baird

== Episodes ==
=== Series 1 ===
Episode 1 The Great Prawn Hunt

Prawn trawler Amity is in a storm, 100 miles from shore, and the nets are caught on the seabed.

Episode 2 The Storm

Skipper Jimmy Buchan must decide whether to run to port through a storm or try and ride it out.

Episode 3 The Edge

Ocean Venture has headed north and is fishing at The Edge, only 150 miles south of the Arctic Circle. Having failed to catch enough fish, skipper John Buchan is taking a huge risk in the deep and treacherous waters of the North Atlantic in a bid to find the perfect catch. With the previous night's storm over, Amity gets back to the business of trying to catch prawns.

Episode 4 Starting Out

The program follows 17-year-old Ryan on his inaugural commercial fishing voyage aboard a British pair trawler operating in the Norwegian Sea for cod and haddock under skipper Kevin West.

Episode 5 Coming Home

Jimmy, skipper of the prawn boat Amity, is 100 miles offshore fishing in one of the most hazardous areas of the North Sea – the Devil's Hole. The engines which bring in his nets are on the brink of failing – if they stop he'll have to cut loose his nets and return to port with no prawns and no pay. 80 miles away, 17-year-old new boy Ryan is desperate to impress skipper of the Ryanwood Kevin West, but time is running out for him to show he's tough enough.

=== Series 4 ===
The series begins with the aftermath of the death of 29-year-old New Dawn deckhand Reynaldo Benitez from the Philippines, who was lost at sea in August 2008, between the filming of the third and fourth series.

== Reception ==
Ahead of the second series, Mark Wright for The Stage described the programme as an "excellent human-interest documentary series", and said that "one has to admire the calm manner of the crews as they work gruelling shifts in horrible, horrible conditions." Sam Wollaston for The Guardian said: "I love Trawlermen [...] But, hell, it's miserable." The Independent's Thomas Sutcliffe closed his review by saying: "If you've been grumbling about the weather recently or worrying about the credit crunch, this series should restore a little perspective."

Matthew Gyves and Matthew Bennett won the Guild of Television Camera Professionals (GTC) Award for Excellence (Factual) for their cinematography on Series 1.

In January 2007 John Buchan, skipper of the Ocean Venture, won an award from Seafood Scotland in recognition for supplying UK fish and chip shops with top quality, responsibly caught fish. The award was part of the Fish and Chip Shop of the Year awards which Seafood Scotland sponsors. The award was presented to his son John Junior who skippers his vessel on alternate trips.

In 2010, the series won the BAFTA Television Craft award for sound in a factual programme. The series was nominated for the same award in 2008.

There was some controversy when the BBC screened several episodes in the first series of Trawlermen with subtitles because of the broad Doric and Broch dialects of the Scots Language spoken by many of the fishing crew.

== Subsequent events ==
On 27 April 2009, Kevin West, one of the trawlermen featured in the series, was believed to have fallen overboard. A mayday was then broadcast and 17 other boats in the area responded to the message and joined the search. A major air and sea search was launched in the area but there was no trace of Mr West. His body was never found.
