= Pole to Pole (book) =

Book by Michael Palin

- First edition
- Author: Michael Palin
- Language: English
- Genre: Non-fiction
- Publisher: BBC Books
- Publication date: 1992
- Publication place: United Kingdom

Pole to Pole is a book written by Michael Palin to accompany his BBC television series Pole to Pole.

== Book contents ==
The book follows the journey he undertook for the BBC series. It consists of text by Palin and many photographs, most of them taken by Basil Pao, the stills photographer who was part of the expedition team.

The book chronicles the journey in five chapters:

- The North Pole to Tallinn – The Arctic, Greenland, Norway, Finland, USSR
- Tallinn to Port Said – USSR, Turkey, Rhodes, Cyprus, Egypt
- Port Said to Nairobi – Egypt, Sudan, Ethiopia, Kenya
- Nairobi to Cape Town – Kenya, Tanzania, Zambia, Zimbabwe, South Africa
- Cape Town to the South Pole – South Africa, Chile, Antarctica

The demonstration of the Coriolis effect in Kenya was, apparently, a clever hoax.

== Audio edition ==
This book is available as an audiobook, read by Michael Palin. There are two versions available. The abridged version lasts 5 hours, 40 minutes and the unabridged version 10 hours, 15 minutes.

== Photograph book ==
Basil Pao produced an accompaniment called Pole to Pole – The Photographs.
