= Pole to Pole with Michael Palin =

1992 British television travel documentary series

- DVD cover
- Written by: Michael Palin
- Directed by: Roger Mills; Clem Vallence
- Presented by: Michael Palin
- Composer: Paddy Kingsland
- Country of origin: United Kingdom
- Original language: English
- No. of series: 1
- No. of episodes: 8

Production
- Producer: Clem Vallence
- Editor: David Thomas
- Running time: 50 minutes
- Production companies: Prominent Television; Passepartout Productions; BBC; A&E

Original release
- Network: BBC1
- Release: 21 October – 9 December 1992

Related
- Around the World in 80 Days with Michael Palin; Full Circle with Michael Palin

Pole to Pole with Michael Palin is an eight-part television BBC documentary travel series, first broadcast on BBC 1 from 21 October to 9 December 1992, and presented by comedian and actor Michael Palin. The programme is the sequel to Around the World in 80 Days with Michael Palin, and was the second of Palin's major journeys, the series focusing on a journey along the 30-degree east line of longitude from the North Pole to the South Pole, sticking to using mainly cars, buses, trains and ships to make the five-month journey, while travelling through northern and eastern Europe (including through the territory of the Soviet Union before its collapse), and Africa; a last-minute change of plans led to the journey diverting through South America, in order to reach Antarctica.

The series' broadcast rights were later sold on to various countries around the world, and later released onto VHS tapes and DVD. A book recounting the trip, Pole to Pole, was later released by the BBC, containing many pictures captured on the trip, as well as Palin's insights on every aspect of the journey he experienced. The series was later followed by Full Circle with Michael Palin in 1997.

== Synopsis ==
Countries visited during Pole to Pole.

In 1991, Michael Palin decided to conduct a new journey that would take him from the North Pole to the South Pole, with the decision being that the journey would stick as close as it could to the line of 30th degree meridian. The planned route involved passing through countries in northern and eastern Europe, Turkey, and then across Africa along the eastern half of the continent, in order to reach a supply ship that made a yearly trip to Antarctica .

Much of the journey mainly used trains, buses and ferries to move between locations and countries, with hire cars, private travel companies and supply ships used for stretches where other arrangements could not be made; a plane ride was also needed to get between the North Pole and the Norwegian island of Spitsbergen. However, plans had to be changed once the journey reached Africa - a detour was required to avoid war-torn regions of southern Sudan affected by the Second Sudanese Civil War at the time of filming, whilst Palin and his film crew had to travel from South Africa to South America to use an aviation travel company to get to the South Pole, after their production office was unable to secure them berths on the supply ship Agulhas prior to its yearly voyage.

As with Palin's previous travel series, each episode covers a particular leg of the journey, and the various sights and people he encountered on his journey, as well the complications and problems he faced on each stage in various parts.

== Episode list ==
No.	Title	Original release date
1	"Cold Start"	21 October 1992
Michael Palin engages in a new journey from the North Pole to the South Pole. From journey's start, he visits the remotely inhabited island of Spitsbergen, as he heads for Tromsø, the "Paris of the North". Moving onwards to Finland, he visits Santa Claus, and enjoys a Finnish sauna near Helsinki. Finally, he moves on to Estonia and the city of Tallinn, understanding its culture and desires for the future, before heading onwards to Russia. Notes: The initial scene of the episode could not be filmed in May 1991, due to unfavourable weather conditions; as such, filming of the series began from Spitsbergen. The opening scene was filmed in May 1992, after Palin had reached the South Pole.
2	"Russian Steps"	28 October 1992
Arriving in Leningrad, Palin encounters a local Vladimir Lenin impersonator, witnesses a Russian Orthodox baptism ceremony, and visits the resting place of Russian composers. Heading southwards to Novgorod, Palin befriends a local Russian film director, and partakes in a ceremony on behalf of the British city of Watford. Reaching Ukraine, Palin visits Chernobyl following the 1986 nuclear disaster, explores the capital of Kyiv, and receives an unusual mud bath treatment in Odesa, before catching a ferry to Turkey. Notes: Filming of the Odessa stage and the departure for Turkey took place a few days before the Soviet coup attempt of 1991, which signalled the collapse of the Soviet Union later that year; the event would be referenced again in the next episode.
3	"Mediterranean Maze"	4 November 1992
Palin reaches Istanbul, where he experiences a Turkish hamam, explores the local bazaar, and admires a procession of Janissary soldiers. Heading south to Rhodes to understands its history, he then moves on to Cyprus to enjoy cream tea refreshments with British soldiers and attend a huge wedding celebration. After making for Egypt, Palin heads southwards on the Nile River, exploring ancient Egyptian ruins and tombs, before catching a ferry in Aswan for Sudan, bracing himself for travel in Central Africa.
4	"Shifting Sands"	11 November 1992
At Wadi Halfa, Palin travels by train to the Sudanese capital of Khartoum, where he visits a British sports club for food and a game, and witnesses a Muslim Sufi ceremony. Forced to circumnavigate the south of the country due to ongoing fighting, Palin and his crew head for Ethiopia with an Eritrean company, dealing with poor road conditions, and entering border territory made unsafe by the conclusion of the Ethiopian Civil War, in order to reach the town of Gedaref.
5	"Crossing the Line"	18 November 1992
Entering Ethiopia, Palin travels with some security as he heads for the country's former capital of Gondar to explore its history, and then presses on to the current capital of Addis Ababa, witnessing the downfall of communist symbols as its people move on to a new political system. Hitchhiking to Kenya, Palin travels southwards for a special visit to the village of Lerata, an interesting lecture at the equator, and to prepare for in Nairobi for a safari.
6	"Plains and Boats and Trains"	25 November 1992
Still in Kenya, Palin continues to study wildlife, and takes a hot-air balloon ride over the country, before heading to Tanzania to fulfil a lifelong dream of visiting the Ngorongoro Crater. At the capital of Dodoma, he takes a train to Kigoma, where he learns of the risks associated to malaria, and visits Ujiji where David Livingstone and Henry Stanley met nearby. Palin then rides on the oldest ferry in the world down Lake Tanganyika, learning of its importance for the locals in the region, as he makes for Zambia.
7	"Evil Shadow"	2 December 1992
In Zambia, Palin encounters a witch doctor and jubliant citizens, before spending a day at the Shiwa Ngandu estate. Travelling to the Victoria Falls, he tries whitewater rafting on the Zambezi River, before heading to Zimbabwe, visiting the grave of Cecil Rhodes, meet members of a bowlers club, and enjoy a local nightclub. Eventually, Palin reaches South Africa, exploring the gold mining industry of Johannesburg, before pressing on for Cape Town aboard the Blue Train, where bad news awaits his arrival.
8	"Bitter End"	9 December 1992
Unable to board the S. A. Agulhas in South Africa, Palin detours to Chile for an alternate route, taking the opportunity to explore Santiago. Heading for Punta Arenas, he braces himself for the flight that will bring him to Antarctica, accompanying others seeking to visit the continent with their own goals in mind. Arriving at Patriot Hills, Palin spends time surveying the landscape, before one more flight brings him to the Amundsen–Scott South Pole Station, and to his final destination - the South Pole.
