= Basil Pao =

Hong Kong photographer

- Occupation: Photographer
- Known for: Stills photographer for Around the World in Eighty Days and Pole to Pole
- Website: https://www.basilpao.com/

Basil Pao Ho-Yun (鲍皓昕) is a Hong Kong–based photographer. He has been the stills photographer on the BBC filming teams that made Michael Palin's television travel programmes.

== Early career ==
Pao was born in Hong Kong, but started his career as an art director and graphic designer in New York and Los Angeles. His work during that time included making numerous record covers and posters for Atlantic Records, PolyGram and Warner Bros. Records.

During this time, Pao also met Michael Palin, when they worked together on the book for the Monty Python film Life of Brian in 1979. The following year, Pao designed the LP cover for Monty Python's Contractual Obligation Album.

In 1980, Pao returned to Hong Kong and took up photography as his new career.

== Michael Palin trips ==
When Michael Palin was doing his first trip for the BBC in 1988, Around the World in Eighty Days, he asked Basil Pao to show him around Hong Kong when he arrived there. After a couple of days in Hong Kong, Palin asked Pao to accompany the BBC team on the stretch from Hong Kong to Shanghai to act as guide and interpreter, and Pao agreed. Many of the photographs between Hong Kong and Shanghai used in the book that Palin later wrote about this trip, Around the World in 80 Days, were taken by Pao.

In 1992, when Palin and the BBC were planning to make a new travel programme, Pole to Pole, they decided that it would be a good idea to have a full-time stills photographer on the team, and that Pao was a top candidate for the job. Pao accepted, and, except for the very first few days and the very last few days (he missed out on the two poles due to lack of space in the small aircraft used at both ends of the trip) it was exclusively his pictures that were used in the follow-on book that Palin wrote, Pole to Pole with Michael Palin.

Pao took 30,000 pictures on the Pole to Pole trip, and together with BBC Books released a large-format book with some of these pictures, Pole to Pole – The Photographs. Palin wrote some introductory text and lent his name to the cover, but the book was almost completely dedicated to Pao's pictures, some of them displayed in two-page spreads.

The success of the collaboration on Pole to Pole marked the start of a long tradition. Each of the following Michael Palin trips for the BBC included Basil Pao on the team as the stills photographer, and it was almost exclusively Pao's pictures that were used in the follow-up book that Palin wrote about each trip. These books are Full Circle, Hemingway Adventure, Sahara, Himalaya and New Europe.

As well as providing pictures for the Michael Palin books, Basil Pao made three additional photography books: Full Circle – The Photographs, Inside Sahara, and Inside Himalaya. Palin's name is featured on each of these books and he provided some introductory text, but these books are otherwise exclusively about Pao's pictures. There are no Basil Pao photography books related to Hemingway Adventure or New Europe, although he was on the team for those trips too.

== Other activities ==
Basil Pao's photographs have been used in books and magazines all over the world. He took photographs for Bernardo Bertolucci's The Last Emperor and Il piccolo Buddha (Little Buddha), and held the photographic exhibitions Glimpses of Silence and The Last Emperor Collection across Asia and Europe. He has also produced several other photography books, including China Revealed (publisher Weidenfeld & Nicolson) and limited edition books Aman and Bhutan for publisher Amanresorts. He also released a book called Hands containing only pictures of people's hands from all over the world.

Pao also performed as an actor in the role of Zaifeng, Prince Chun in The Last Emperor.

In 2023, he published Carnival of Dreams, a retrospective of his 50-year career.
