= Michael Palin's Hemingway Adventure =

1999 British television travel documentary series

- DVD cover
- Written by: Michael Palin
- Presented by: Michael Palin
- Country of origin: United Kingdom
- Original language: English
- No. of series: 1
- No. of episodes: 4

Production
- Running time: 50 minutes

Original release
- Network: BBC One
- Release: 17 October – 7 November 1999

Related
- Full Circle with Michael Palin; Sahara with Michael Palin

Michael Palin's Hemingway Adventure is a 1999 BBC television documentary presented by Michael Palin. It records Palin's travels as he visited many sites where Ernest Hemingway had been. The sites include Spain, Chicago, Paris, Italy, Africa, Key West, Cuba, and Idaho.

After the trip was over Michael Palin wrote a book about the journey and his experiences. This book contains both Palin's text and many pictures by Basil Pao, the stills photographer who was on the team.

== The journey ==
The series consists of four 50-minute episodes, as follows:

=== Episode 1 ===
The programme starts out with Palin sitting on a beach reading a novel of Hemingway. After being chased by a fake bull he ends up in Pamplona, Spain, the setting for Hemingway's novel The Sun Also Rises. There he watches the famous bull run and then goes to interview a professional matador, Vicente Barrera. Hemingway loved the bull run, and Palin confides that it must be an age thing – he can't stand watching it. Palin travels to Valencia to witness another fiesta, 'fallas'.

Travelling to Africa where Hemingway went on many safaris, Palin goes to a local Maasai circumcision where the teenage boys are dressed up in finery. "Which of you is the most beautiful here?" he asked. "We are all beautiful," replies the boy, "except you!" Afterwards, he catches a view of Mount Kilimanjaro, Africa's highest point.

=== Episode 2 ===
In Chicago, Palin spends a bit of time exploring the city before going to Hemingway's birthplace, Oak Park. After strolling through Hemingway's first home and singing some of his childhood songs, he goes back to Chicago and enters a local shooting range, hoping to be like Hemingway. Mostly, Palin just jumps at the recoil.

On to Michigan, where Palin visits the area where Hemingway first learned to fish, and attempts to catch a few himself. He catches none and ends up hooking the cameraman's ear. Going to the local grocer, Palin asks for things that might have been on Hemingway's shopping list to see if the modern grocer would still carry it. In the process of asking for canned meat, ("We have Spam," the grocer says,) he ends up singing the Spam song from the famous Monty Python sketch. Then it's off to Italy.

In Italy, Palin goes to the area where Hemingway was wounded during World War I and supposedly buried a ten-pound note in the ground. After a fruitless search, Palin buries his book in the ground. After attempting to drive an Italian ambulance and become a Red Cross nurse, he travels on to France.

Paris, France was "...the city I love most in all the world," according to Hemingway. Now Palin goes through the City of Lights and reenacts perhaps the strangest part of Hemingway's life in 1928 – when the writer was reaching for the cord for the lavatory, he ended up pulling the skylight cord, and the pane of glass crashed on top of his head.

Countries visited during Hemingway Adventure.

=== Episode 3 ===
In a random twist of events, Palin pops up in the Florida Keys and sees a Hemingway look-alike contest at the local restaurant in Key West. He also goes to visit a man who had boxed with Hemingway.

Going to Uganda, Palin looks at the site where Hemingway's plane crashed, after which the newspaper headlines incorrectly declared that the famous author and his wife were dead. Palin soon flies on to Venice, Italy, to keep following Hemingway's always moving footsteps.

In Venice, Palin walks in the midst of an ancient festival that had been forgotten for 200 years and was revived only in 1975. The people wear masks and cloaks, so Palin decides to get into the spirit and dresses up as a Gumby from the Monty Python television series. After this, Palin goes to a dinner before participating in a duck hunt, and interviews the Italian people at the meal. Putting on a warm jacket and gloves, Palin and the Barone, his duck-hunting partner, wait in vain for three and a half hours for a duck to come.

=== Episode 4 ===
Palin flies to Cuba where he finds many Hemingway leads and visits his former home and a hotel room he often stayed in. Many failed attempts to interview President Castro are made, and Palin, after waiting a few extra days to have an interview, jets off towards the American West.

Following the last stretch of Hemingway's life, Palin becomes a cowboy at a dude ranch in Montana and succeeds in roping the camera operator. After rounding up a few cows, Palin goes to Ketchum, Idaho to visit Hemingway's grave. He professes that "I'm still looking for some sort of approval from him... some sort of nod of acknowledgment from Hemingway." The grave obligingly replies, "Bullshit."

== DVD edition ==
The programme has been released on DVD in the UK, on a single disc. Unlike the DVD editions of all of the other Michael Palin trips there is no extra material on this DVD. It was released on DVD in Region 1 (North America) in 2008.
