= Travel photography =

Photography genre

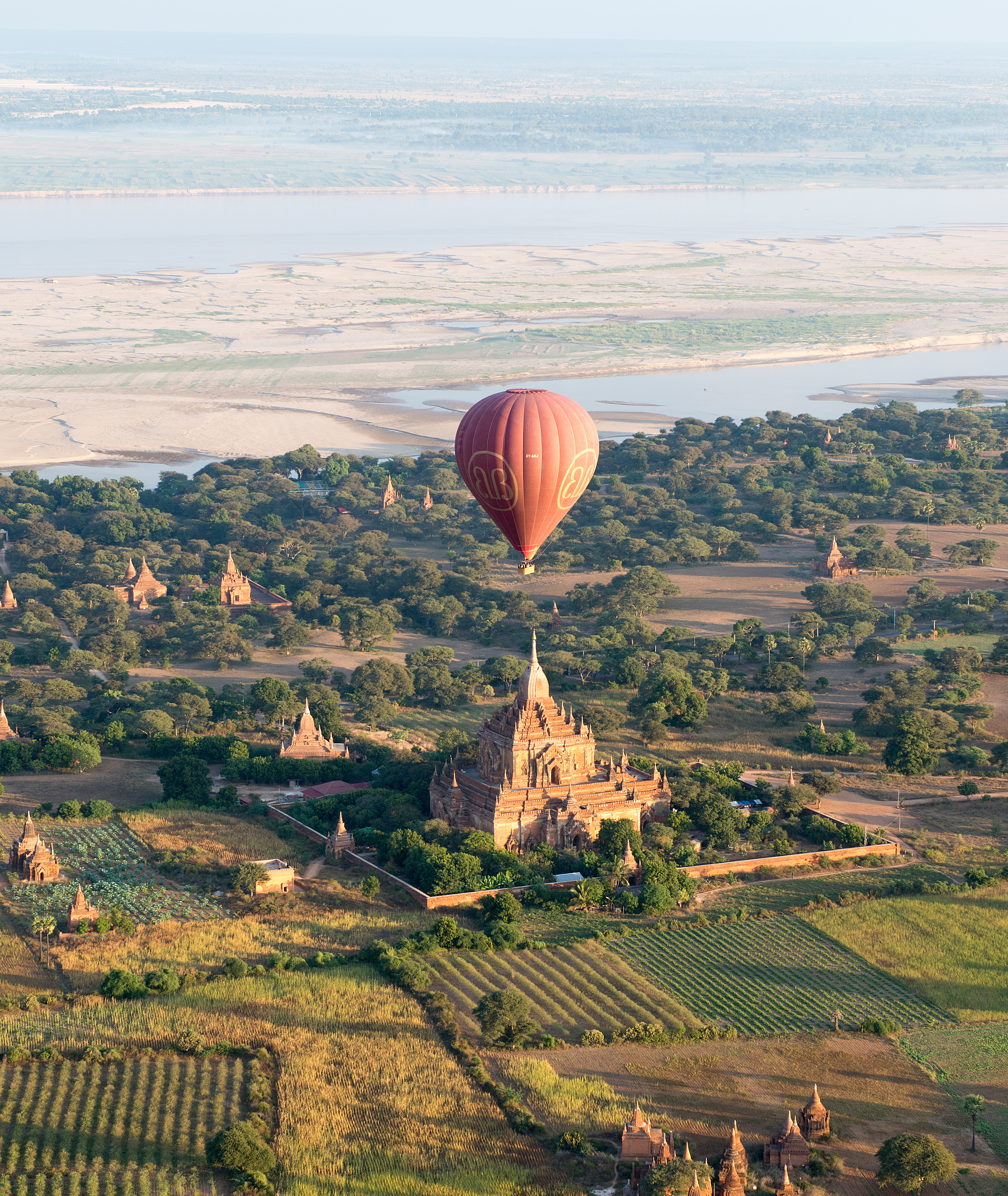
A hot-air balloon flying over a pagoda in Bagan, Myanmar. The photograph taken by Christopher Michel.

Travel photography is a genre of photography that may involve the documentation of an area's landscape, people, cultures, customs, and history. The Photographic Society of America defines a travel photo as an image that expresses the feeling of a time and place, portrays a land, its people, or a culture in its natural state, and has no geographical limitations.

Travel photography as a genre is one of the most open in terms of the subjects it covers. Many travel photographers specialize in a particular aspect of photography such as travel portraits, landscape or documentary photography as well as shooting all aspects of travel. Much of today's travel photography style is derived from early work in Magazines such as National Geographic magazine from photographers such as Steve McCurry. This genre of photography entails shooting a wide variety of subjects under varied available conditions, e.g. low light photography indoors, available ambient light photography for exteriors of buildings and monuments, shooting on the streets where sometimes conditions may be hostile, capturing moments which rarely recur, capturing the magic of light while shooting landscapes, etc.

As travel has become more accessible, more and more, the genre is opening up to amateurs and professionals alike. Amateur travel photography is often shared through sites like Flickr, 500px and 1x. Travel photography, unlike other genres like fashion, product, or food photography, is still an underestimated and relatively less monetized genre, though the challenges faced by travel photographers are a lot greater than some of the genres where the light and other shooting conditions may be controllable. Traditionally travel photographers earned money through Stock photography, magazine assignments, and commercial projects. In recent years, the stock photography market has collapsed and more and more photographers are using alternative methods of earning a living such as through blogging, public speaking, commercial projects, and teaching.

== Consumers of travel photography ==
Besides the travel publications like National Geographic Traveler, Conde Nast Traveler, etc., the demand for this genre exists in industries like Travel, Photo Education, etc. Many travel photographers today are leading photo-tours through companies, utilizing their knowledge of unique travel locations, experience of working as professional photographers and using this to help travel enthusiasts take great travel images during their trips. Many others are doubling up as educators in the field of ambient light photography. Some of them are doing assignments which intrinsically use their strengths, e.g. shooting exteriors or interiors of buildings for architects and interior designers. Photographers like Steve McCurry are often commissioned to shoot commercial advertising work using their skills from travel and documentary photography.

== History ==
Early practitioners include Francis Bedford, George Bridges, Maxime Du Camp, Solomon Nunes Carvalho, Francis Frith and James Ricalton.

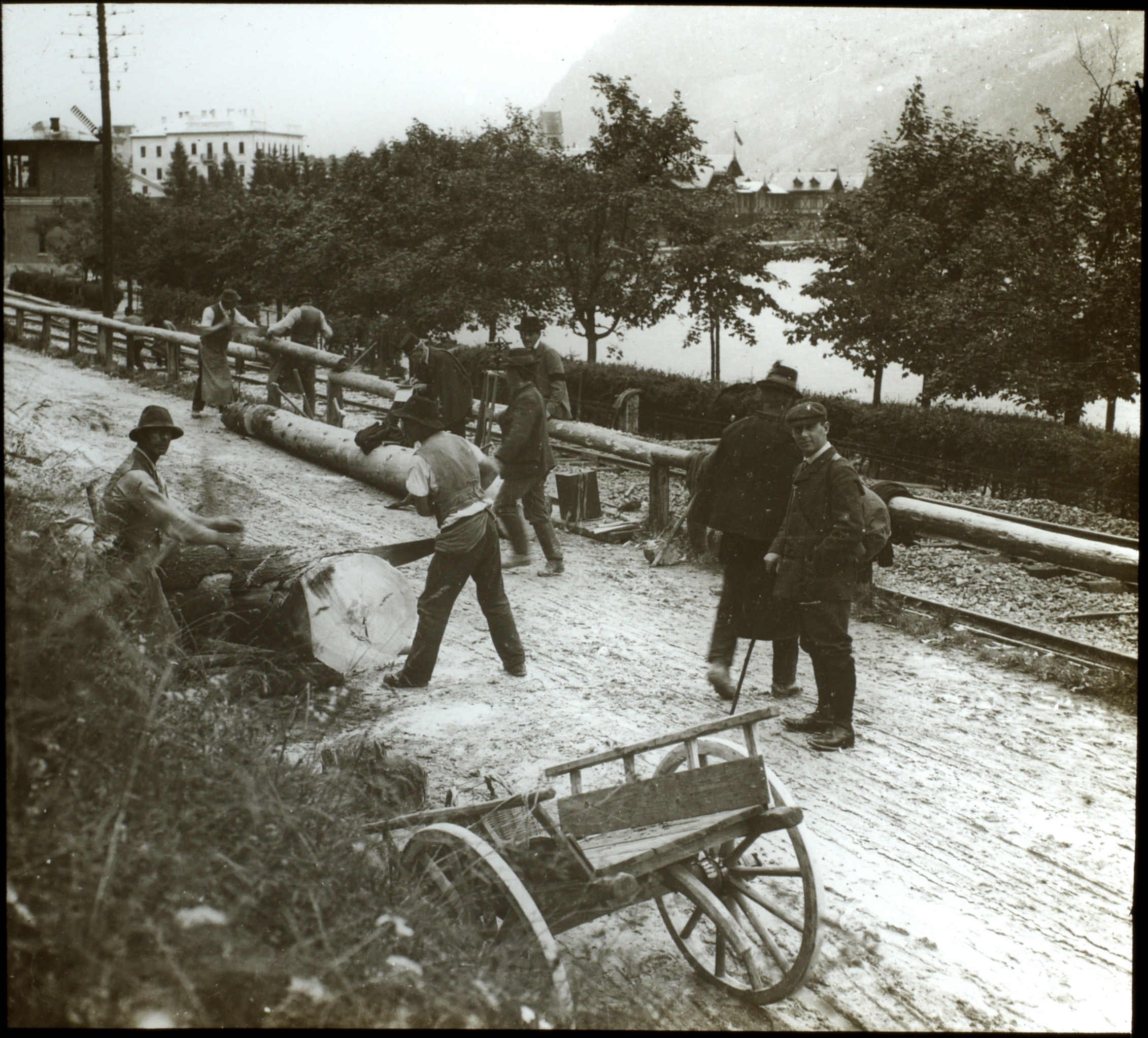
July 1903 - Zell am See - Alexander Eric Hasse
