= Around the World in Eighty Days =

1872 novel written by Jules Verne

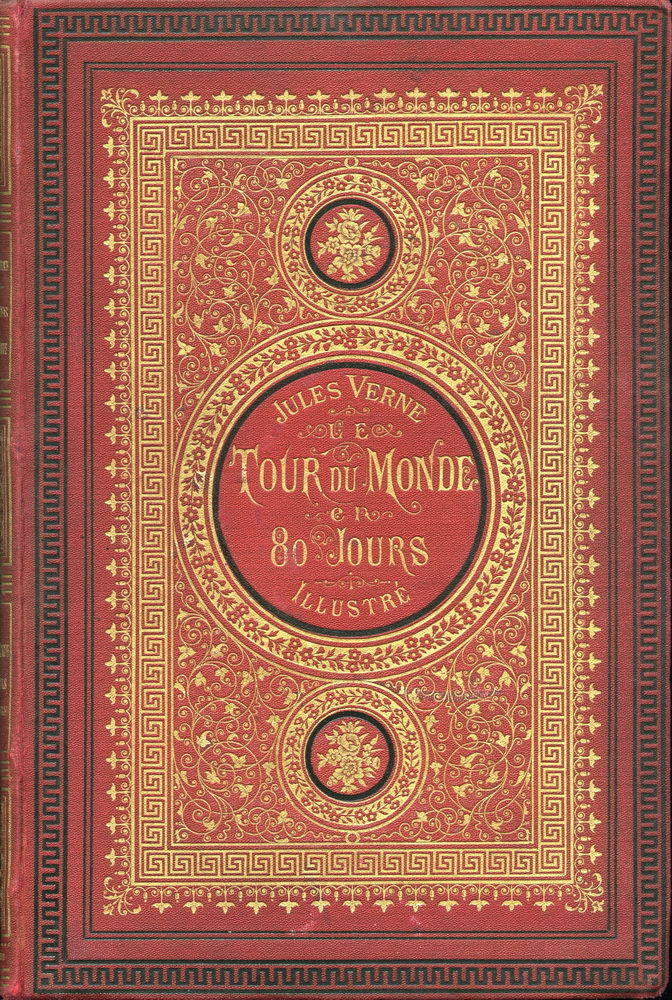
- Cover of French first edition 1873
- Author: Jules Verne
- Original title: Le Tour du monde en quatre-vingts jours
- Illustrator: Alphonse-Marie-Adolphe de Neuville and Léon Benett
- Language: French
- Series: The Extraordinary Voyages #11
- Genre: Adventure novel
- Publisher: Le Temps (as serial); Pierre-Jules Hetzel (book form)
- Publication date: 1872 (as serial); 30 January 1873
- Publication place: France
- English publication date: 1873
- Preceded by: The Fur Country
- Followed by: The Mysterious Island
- Text: Around the World in Eighty Days at Wikisource

Around the World in Eighty Days (French: Le Tour du monde en quatre-vingts jours) is an adventure novel by the French writer Jules Verne, first published in French in 1872. In the story, Phileas Fogg of London and his newly employed French valet Jean Passepartout attempt to circumnavigate the world in 80 days on a wager of £20,000 (equivalent to £2.5 million in 2024) set by his friends at the Reform Club. It is one of Verne's most acclaimed works.

== Plot ==
Phileas Fogg is a rich British gentleman with mathematically precise habits. He lives a solitary and modest life in London, where he is a member of the Reform Club. On 2 October 1872, after dismissing his valet for serving shaving water at the wrong temperature, Fogg hires Frenchman Jean Passepartout as a replacement. That night at the Club, Fogg gets into an argument over a newspaper article stating that, with a new railway section in India, it is now possible to circumnavigate the world in 80 days. Fogg wagers £20,000, half of his fortune, that he can achieve the feat, departing London that night and returning to the Club by 8:45 p.m. on 21 December. Accompanied by Passepartout and carrying the remaining £20,000 to cover expenses, he sets off by train.

The itinerary (as originally planned)
London to Suez, Egypt	Rail to Brindisi, Italy, via Turin and steamer (the Mongolia) across the Mediterranean Sea	7 days
Suez to Bombay, India with a stopover in Aden	Steamer (the Mongolia) across the Red Sea and the Indian Ocean	13 days
Bombay to Calcutta, India	Rail	3 days
Calcutta to Victoria, Hong Kong with a stopover in Singapore	Steamer (the Rangoon) across the South China Sea	13 days
Hong Kong to Yokohama, Japan	Steamer (the Carnatic) across the South China Sea, East China Sea, and the Pacific Ocean	6 days
Yokohama to San Francisco, USA	Steamer (the General Grant) across the Pacific Ocean	22 days
San Francisco to New York City, USA	Rail	7 days
New York to London, England (UK)	Steamer (the China) across the Atlantic Ocean to Liverpool and rail	9 days
Total		80 days
Map of the trip Map of the trip.

Fogg and Passepartout reach Suez on time, where Scotland Yard Detective Fix, hunting a bank robber who vaguely matches Fogg's appearance as described, begins watching him. Fix joins them aboard the steamer Mongolia to Bombay, befriending Passepartout without revealing his purpose. Fogg bribes the crew to arrive in Bombay two days early. However, the railway line to Calcutta is incomplete. Fogg purchases an elephant, hires a guide and starts toward Allahabad. The travellers witness a sati ritual in which a young Indian widow, Aouda, is to be burned alive on her husband's funeral pyre while drugged, and they decide to rescue her. Passepartout disguises himself as the dead husband and rises from the pyre to scare off the priests and carry Aouda away. The two days gained earlier are lost, but Fogg shows no regret. The group boards a train at Allahabad with Aouda and continues to Calcutta. Fix, having arrived ahead in Calcutta, has Fogg and Passepartout arrested for a crime Passepartout committed in Bombay. They jump bail and board the steamer Rangoon to Hong Kong, with Fix boarding as well.

In Hong Kong, learning Aouda's relative has moved to Holland, they decide to take her along to Europe. Fix, desperate to arrest Fogg on British soil, confides in Passepartout, who dismisses him as a spy for the Reform Club. To sabotage the group's departure on the Carnatic, Fix drugs Passepartout in an opium den. Passepartout still manages to board, but cannot inform Fogg that the steamer is leaving the evening before its scheduled departure date. Fogg, having missed the Carnatic, boards the pilot boat Tankadere with Aouda and Fix to Shanghai, where they catch a steamer to Yokohama. There, they reunite with Passepartout, who has been working in a circus to earn the fare for his homeward journey. The group sails across the Pacific on the General Grant to San Francisco. Fix, now beyond British jurisdiction, promises Passepartout he will support Fogg's return to Britain, where he can arrest him.

America's transcontinental train faces a crossing herd of bison, a failing suspension bridge, and a Sioux ambush. Passepartout is kidnapped, but Fogg rescues him with help from American soldiers. They continue via wind-powered sled to Omaha and catch a train to New York City, but miss their intended steamer. On board the Henrietta destined for Bordeaux, Fogg stages a mutiny to redirect to Liverpool. When the boat's coal runs out during a hurricane, Fogg buys the boat and has the crew burn the wooden parts for fuel. They reach Queenstown, Ireland, then travel by train and ferry to Liverpool.

On English soil, Fix arrests Fogg, but the actual robber's capture three days earlier is revealed. Though Fogg's name is cleared, he misses his London train as a result of the delay. He orders a special train and arrives apparently five minutes late, certain he has lost the wager. The next day, Fogg apologises to Aouda for his impending poverty, but she nevertheless confesses her love and proposes to him. While arranging the wedding, Passepartout discovers the date is actually 21 December, not 22 December. Travelling eastward, the party gained a day by crossing longitudes, experiencing 80 sunrises while London only saw 79. Fogg rushes to the Club and arrives on time to win the wager. Having spent almost £19,000 during the journey, he divides the remainder between Passepartout and Fix, and marries Aouda.

== Background and analysis ==
Around the World in Eighty Days was written during difficult times, both for France and Verne. It was during the Franco-Prussian War (1870–1871) in which Verne was conscripted as a coastguard; he was having financial difficulties (his previous works were not paid royalties); his father had died recently; and he had witnessed a public execution, which disturbed him.

The technological innovations of the 19th century had opened the possibility of rapid circumnavigation, and the prospect fascinated Verne and his readership. In particular, three technological breakthroughs occurred in 1869–1870 that made a tourist-like around-the-world journey possible for the first time: the completion of the first transcontinental railroad in America (1869), the opening of the Suez Canal (1869), and the linking of the Indian railways across the sub-continent (1870). It was another notable mark at the end of an age of exploration and the start of an age of fully global tourism that could be enjoyed in relative comfort and safety. It sparked the imagination that anyone could sit down, draw up a schedule, buy tickets and travel around the world, a feat previously reserved for only the most heroic and hardy of adventurers.

The story began serialization in Le Temps on 6 November 1872. The story was published in instalments over the next 45 days, with its ending timed to synchronize Fogg's 21 December deadline with the real world. Chapter XXXV appeared on 20 December; 21 December, the date upon which Fogg was due to appear back in London, did not include an installment of the story; on 22 December, the final two chapters announced Fogg's success. As it was being published serially for the first time, some readers believed that the journey was actually taking place – bets were placed, and some railway companies and ship liner companies lobbied Verne to appear in the book. It is unknown if Verne submitted to their requests, but the descriptions of some rail and shipping lines leave some suspicion that he was influenced.

Concerning the final coup de théâtre, Fogg had thought it was one day later than it actually was because he had forgotten that during his journey, he had added a full day to his clock, at the rate of an hour per 15° of longitude crossed. A recurring criticism of the book is that Fogg should have known and planned for this phenomenon due to his "exact" nature, despite him being shown to make similar errors elsewhere. At the time of publication and until 1884, a de jure International Date Line did not exist. If it did, he would likely have been made aware of the change in date once he reached this line. Thus, the day he added to his clock throughout his journey would be removed upon crossing it. However, Fogg's mistake would not have been likely to occur in the real world because a de facto date line did exist. The UK, India, and the US had the same calendar despite different local times. When he arrived in San Francisco, he would have noticed that the local date was one day earlier than shown in his travel diary. Consequently, it is unlikely he would fail to notice that the departure dates of the transcontinental train in San Francisco and of the China steamer in New York were one day earlier than his travel diary. He would also somehow have to avoid looking at any newspapers. Additionally, in Who Betrays Elizabeth Bennet?, John Sutherland points out that Fogg and company would have to be "deaf, dumb and blind" not to notice how busy the streets were on an apparent "Sunday", with the Sunday Observance Act 1780 still in effect.

== Real-life imitations ==
Following publication in 1873, various people attempted to follow Fogg's fictional circumnavigation, often within self-imposed constraints:

- In 1889, Nellie Bly undertook to travel around the world in 80 days for her newspaper, the New York World. She managed to do the journey within 72 days, meeting Verne in Amiens. Her book Around the World in Seventy-Two Days became a bestseller.
- In 1889, Elizabeth Bisland, working for the Cosmopolitan became a rival to Bly, racing her across the world to try to achieve the global crossing first. She completed the trip in 76 1/2 days, well ahead of Fogg's fictional record but slower than Bly's.
- In 1894, George Griffith carried out a publicity stunt on behalf of C. Arthur Pearson by circumnavigating the world in 65 days, from 12 March to 16 May. The tale of his journey was told in Pearson's Weekly in 14 parts between 2 June and 1 September 1894, bearing the title "How I Broke the Record Round the World". It was later published in book form in 2008 under the title Around the World in 65 Days.
- In 1903, James Willis Sayre, an American theatre critic and arts promoter, set a world record for circling the earth using public transport: 54 days, 9 hours and 42 minutes.
- In 1908, Harry Bensley, on a wager, set out to circumnavigate the world on foot wearing an iron mask. The journey was abandoned, incomplete, at the outbreak of World War I in 1914.
- In 1924, three British airmen attempted to fly around the world with various stops along the way. They faced many and varied perils along the way, but finally gave up at the Bering Sea.
- In 1924, an American team of four planes succeeded in flying around the world, but it took much more than 80 days. Departing on 6 April, they arrived in Seattle on 28 September, 175 days later. However, measured in flight time, it only took 66 days. The additional ground time was attributed to repairs and waiting for clear weather.
- In 1928, 15-year-old Danish Boy Scout Palle Huld travelled around the world by train and ship in the opposite direction to the one in the book. His trip was sponsored by a Danish newspaper and made on the occasion of the 100th birthday of Jules Verne. The trip was described in the book A Boy Scout Around the World. It took 44 days. He took the Trans-Siberian Railway and did not go by India.
- In 1984, Nicholas Coleridge emulated Fogg's trip, taking 78 days; he wrote a book titled Around the World in 78 Days.
- In 1988, Monty Python member Michael Palin took on a similar challenge without using aircraft, as a part of a television travelogue, called Around the World in 80 Days with Michael Palin. He completed the journey in 79 days and 7 hours.
- Since 1993, the Jules Verne Trophy has been given to the boat that sails around the world without stopping and with no outside assistance in the shortest time.
- In 2009, twelve celebrities performed a relay version of the journey for the BBC Children in Need charity appeal.
- In 2011, Brazilian businessman and TV host Álvaro Garnero and journalist José Antonio Ramalho made a bet with a pub owner in London to travel around the world in 80 days. The Record (TV network) TV series "50 by 1 - Around the World in 80 Days" followed their journey. Both Brazilians crossed the Atlantic and Pacific, the USA, Canada, Alaska, Japan, South Korea, China, Mongolia, Russia, Ukraine, Belarus, the Baltic nations, Scandinavia, Germany, the Netherlands, Belgium and France to end again at the pub in 81 days (they arrived in London in 80 days but the pub was closed at night).
- In 2017, Mark Beaumont, a British cyclist inspired by Verne, set out to cycle across the world in 80 days. He completed the trip in 78 days, 14 hours and 40 minutes, after departing from Paris on 2 July 2017. Beaumont beat the previous world record of 123 days, set by Andrew Nicholson, by cycling 29,000 km (18,000 mi) across the globe, visiting Russia, Mongolia, China, Australia, New Zealand, Canada, the US and a number of countries in Europe.

== Origins ==
The idea of a trip around the world within a set period had clear external origins. It was popular before Verne published his book in 1873. Even the title Around the World in Eighty Days is not original. Several sources have been hypothesized as the origins of the story.

Another early reference comes from the Italian traveller Giovanni Francesco Gemelli Careri. He wrote a book in 1699 that was translated into French: Voyage around the World or Voyage du Tour du Monde (1719, Paris).

Around the World by Steam, via Pacific Railway, was published in 1871 by the Union Pacific Railroad Company, and Around the World in A Hundred and Twenty Days by Edmond Planchut. In early 1870, the Erie Railway Company published a statement of routes, times, and distances detailing a trip around the globe of 38,204 km (23,739 mi) in 77 days and 21 hours.

American William Perry Fogg travelled the world, describing his tour in a series of letters to The Cleveland Leader newspaper, entitled Round the World: Letters from Japan, China, India, and Egypt (1872).

In 1872, Thomas Cook organised the first around-the-world tourist trip, leaving on 20 September 1872 and returning seven months later. The journey was described in a series of letters published in 1873 as Letter from the Sea and from Foreign Lands, Descriptive of a tour Round the World. Scholars have pointed out similarities between Verne's account and Cook's letters. However, some argue that Cook's trip happened too late to influence Verne. According to a second-hand 1898 account, Verne refers to a Cook advertisement as a source for the idea of his book. In interviews in 1894 and 1904, Verne says the source was "through reading one day in a Paris cafe" and "due merely to a tourist advertisement seen by chance in the columns of a newspaper." Around the World itself says the origins were a newspaper article. All of these point to Cook's advert as being a probable spark for the idea of the book.

The periodical Le Tour du monde (3 October 1869) contained a short piece titled "Around the World in Eighty Days", which refers to 230 km (140 mi) of the railway not yet completed between Allahabad and Bombay, a central point in Verne's work. But even the Le Tour de monde article was not entirely original; it cites in its bibliography the Nouvelles Annales des Voyages, de la Géographie, de l'Histoire et de l'Archéologie (August 1869), which also contains the title Around the World in Eighty Days in its contents page. The Nouvelles Annales were written by Conrad Malte-Brun (1775–1826) and his son Victor Adolphe Malte-Brun (1816–1889). Scholars believe that Verne was aware of the Le Tour de monde article, the Nouvelles Annales, or both and that he consulted it or them, noting that the Le Tour du monde even included a trip schedule very similar to Verne's final version.

A possible inspiration was the traveller George Francis Train, who made four trips around the world, including one in 80 days in 1870. Similarities include the hiring of a private train and being imprisoned. Train later claimed, "Verne stole my thunder. I'm Phileas Fogg."

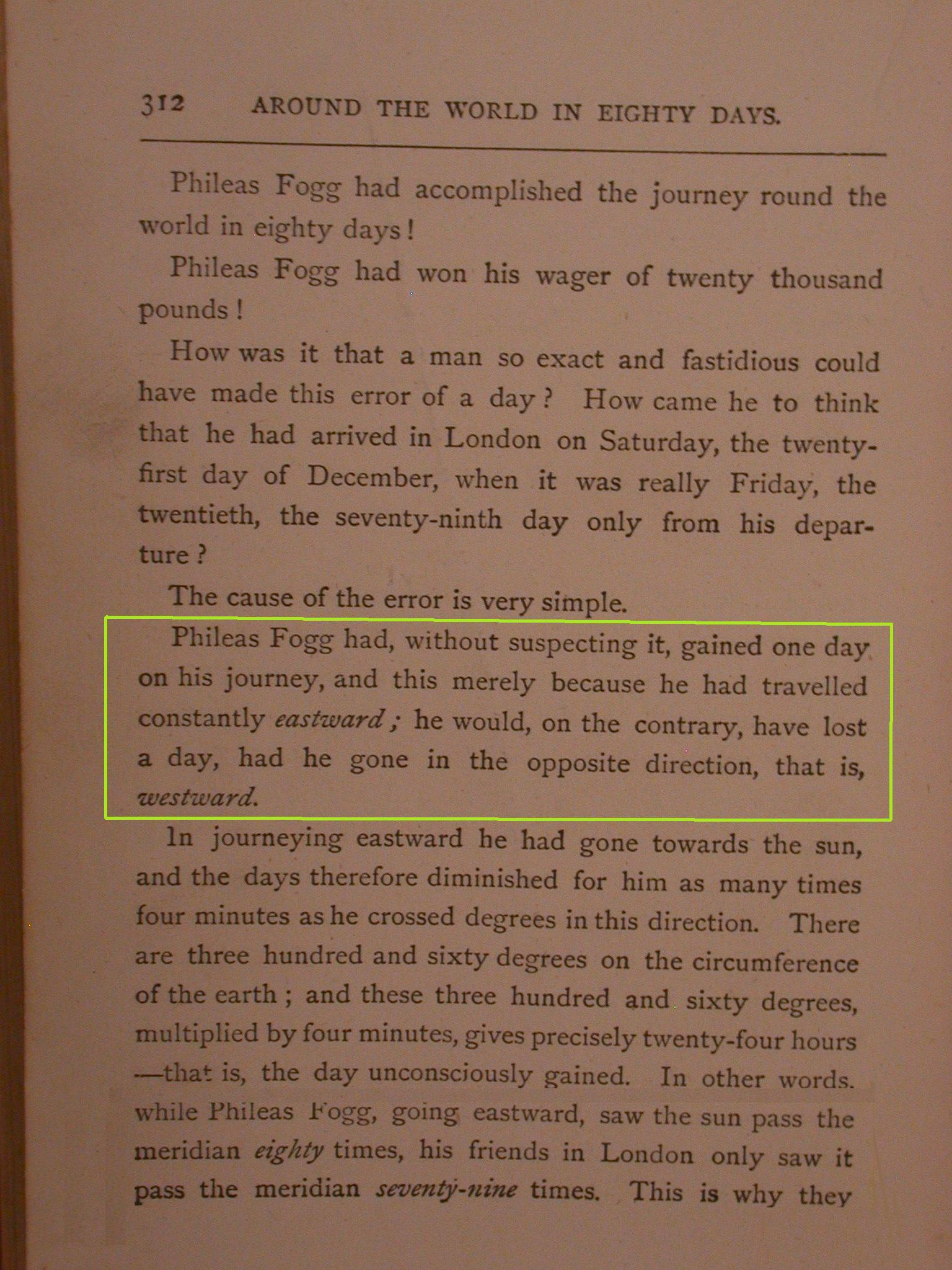
The book page containing the famous dénouement (page 312 in the Philadelphia – Porter & Coates, 1873 edition)

Regarding the idea of gaining a day, Verne said of its origin: "I have a great number of scientific odds and ends in my head. It was thus that, when, one day in a Paris café, I read in the Siècle that a man could travel around the world in 80 days, it immediately struck me that I could profit by a difference of meridian and make my traveller gain or lose a day in his journey. There was a dénouement ready found. The story was not written until long after. I carry ideas about in my head for years – ten, or 15 years, sometimes – before giving them form." In his April 1873 lecture, "The Meridians and the Calendar", Verne responded to a question about where the change of day occurred since the International Date Line only became current in 1880 and the Greenwich prime meridian was not adopted internationally until 1884. Verne cited an 1872 article in Nature, and Edgar Allan Poe's short story "Three Sundays in a Week" (1841), which was also based on going around the world and the difference in a day linked to a marriage at the end. Verne even analysed Poe's story in his Edgar Poe and His Works (1864).

== Adaptations and influences ==
The book has been adapted or reimagined many times in different forms.

=== Literature ===
- The novel Around the world in 100 days by Gary Blackwood (2010) serves as a sequel to the events in 80 days. The book follows Phileas's son as he travels around the world by car instead of train, hence the longer time limit.
- The novel The Other Log of Phileas Fogg by Philip Jose Farmer (1973) tells the secret history of Phileas Fogg's unprecedented trip, in which two alien races contend for Earth's mastery.

=== Theatre ===
- The novel was converted into a play by Verne and Adolphe d'Ennery for production in Paris in 1874. The play was translated into English and brought to the United States by The Kiralfy Brothers.
- Orson Welles produced a musical version with Cole Porter in 1946 called Around the World.
- Another musical version, 80 Days, with songs by Ray Davies of the Kinks and a book by playwright Snoo Wilson, directed by Des McAnuff, ran at the Mandell Weiss Theatre in San Diego from 23 August to 9 October 1988, receiving mixed responses from the critics. Davies's multi-faceted music, McAnuff's directing, and the acting were well received, with the show winning the "Best Musical" award from the San Diego Theatre Critics Circle.
- Mark Brown adapted the book for a five-actor stage production in 2001. It has been performed in New York, Canada, England, South Africa, and Bangladesh.
- Toby Hulse created an adaptation for three actors, which was first produced at The Egg at The Theatre Royal, Bath in 2010. It was revived at the Arcola Theatre in London in 2013 and The Theatre Chipping Norton in 2014.

=== Radio ===
- The novel was adapted twice by Orson Welles for his Mercury Theatre broadcasts, 23 October 1938 (60 minutes) and 7 June 1946 (30 minutes).
- Jules Verne – Around the World in Eighty Days, a 4-part drama adaptation in 2010 by Terry James and directed by Janet Whittaker for BBC Radio 7 (now BBC Radio 4 Extra), starred Leslie Phillips as Phileas Fogg, Yves Aubert as Passepartout and Jim Broadbent as Sergeant Fix.

=== Film ===
Around the World in Eighty Days (1919)

- In 1919, a silent film was released. Produced in Germany and starring Conrad Veidt as Phileas Fogg, the film's original German title was Die Reise um die Erde in 80 Tagen. Its original 2-hour and 11-minute running time was later cut by seven minutes. The film was considered lost as of 2002.
- In 1923, a silent serial based on the book was released. Titled Around the World in 18 days, the serial told the story of Fogg's descendant, Phileas Fogg III, and his attempt to recreate his grandfather's journey.
- In 1938, a French/English co-production entitled An Indian Fantasy Story featured the wager at the Reform Club and the rescue of the Indian Princess. However, the production was never completed.
- In 1956, Michael Anderson directed a film adaptation starring David Niven and Cantinflas. The film won five Oscars, including Academy Award for Best Picture.
- In 1963, a comedy film The Three Stooges Go Around the World in a Daze starring The Three Stooges in the Passepartout role was released to exploit the popularity of the 1956 film and the Stooges' resurgence in popularity that began in 1959.
- In 1910, Serbian writer Branislav Nušić, inspired by the works of Jules Verne, wrote the comedy Travel Around the World (Put oko sveta). This play was later adapted into a film of the same name in 1964, directed by Soja Jovanović, one of the first female directors in the former Yugoslavia. The film was produced by Avala Film.
- In 2000, Warner Home Video released Tweety's High-Flying Adventure in which Tweety flies around the world in 80 days collecting cat paw prints in order to raise money for a children's park. The film was also adapted into a game for the Game Boy Color that same year.
- In 2004, a film was made, loosely based on the book, starring Steve Coogan and Jackie Chan in the roles of Fogg and Passepartout respectively. The adaptation bears less resemblance to the book. The film was a disappointment at the box office, received mixed reviews from critics, and was nominated for two Razzie Awards.

=== Television ===
- Around the World in Eighty Days, a 1972 Australian animated television adaptation.
- The Wonderful World of Puss 'n Boots, a 1969 Japanese cel-animated film.
- Wielka Podróż Bolka i Lolka, a 1978 Polish 15-episode miniseries in the Bolek and Lolek cartoon franchise, where Bolek and Lolek must compete with Fogg's descendant in a bet to repeat his fabled journey.
- Around the World with Willy Fog, a 1984 Spanish animated television adaptation.
- Pierce Brosnan starred as Phileas Fogg in the 1989 mini series with Julia Nickson, Peter Ustinov, and Eric Idle.
- Sir Michael Palin partially attempted to recreate the journey for a documentary series: Around the World in 80 Days with Michael Palin.
- Mickey Mouse Works "MouseTales" segment and House of Mouse episode "Mickey and Minnie's Big Vacation", with Mickey Mouse in the role of Phileas Fogg, Goofy as Jean Passepartout, Scrooge McDuck as Lord Abermarle, and Minnie Mouse as Princess Aouda.
- Around the World in 80 Days, a 2021 international co-produced series starring David Tennant as Phileas Fogg.

=== Games ===
- There have been several board games based, often loosely, upon the story.
- The 2004 mobile video game Around the World in 80 Days is based on the 2004 film.
- The 2005 PC video game 80 Days (2005 video game), developed by Frogwares, is based on the novel.
- The 2014 game of the same name, 80 Days (2014 video game), developed by Inkle, is loosely based on the novel while introducing various science fiction elements.
- The 2020 mobile video game Sherlock: Hidden Match-3 Cases, developed by G5 Entertainment, is partly based on the novel.

=== Internet ===
- Flightfox created a trip, "Around the World in 80 Hours", to see if flight experts could find cheap flights following the same path as described in the book. The online travel company published a fiction eBook based on the results of the contest.

=== Other ===
- Worlds of Fun, an amusement park in Kansas City, Missouri, was conceived using the novel as its theme.
- Starting in the second half of the 20th century, and continuing up to the present day (2022), a number of airlines had "Around the World in 80 Days" fares, in which one could take as many flights in one direction as one wanted within the requisite time frame.

== Sources ==
- William Butcher, ed. and trans., Around the World in Eighty Days, Oxford World's Classics (1995, 1999).
