= Around the World in 80 Days (miniseries) =

- DVD sleeve artwork
- Based on: Around the World in 80 Days by Jules Verne
- Written by: John Gay
- Directed by: Buzz Kulik
- Starring: Pierce Brosnan; Eric Idle; Julia Nickson; Peter Ustinov
- Theme music composer: Billy Goldenberg
- Countries of origin: United States; Italy; Yugoslavia; Germany
- No. of episodes: 3

Production
- Executive producer: Renée Valente
- Producer: Paul Baerwald
- Cinematography: Nicholas D. Knowland
- Editors: David Beatty; Les Green; Peter Parasheles
- Running time: 266 minutes
- Production companies: Avala Film; Harmony Gold

Original release
- Network: NBC
- Release: April 16 – April 18, 1989

Around the World in 80 Days is a three-part television miniseries originally broadcast on NBC from April 16 to 18, 1989. The production garnered three nominations for Emmy awards that year. The teleplay by John Gay is based on the 1873 Jules Verne novel of the same title.

== Plot ==
The plot centres on Phileas Fogg (Pierce Brosnan) making a £30,000 wager with three members of the Reform Club that he can circumnavigate the world in 80 days. He takes with him his newly employed French valet Passepartout (Eric Idle), and is pursued by Detective Wilbur Fix (Peter Ustinov) who mistakenly thinks Fogg robbed the Bank of England and is using the wager as a cover to escape capture.

== Cast ==
- Pierce Brosnan as Phileas Fogg
- Eric Idle as Jean Passepartout
- Julia Nickson as Princess Aouda
- Peter Ustinov as Detective Wilbur Fix
- Jack Klugman as Capt. Bunsby
- Roddy McDowall as McBaines
- Darren McGavin as Benjamin Mudge
- Robert Morley as Wentworth
- Stephen Nichols as Jesse James
- Lee Remick as Sarah Bernhardt
- Jill St. John as Woman mistaken for Princess Aouda
- Robert Wagner as Alfred Bennett
- Arielle Dombasle as Lucette
- Gabriele Ferzetti as Italian Chief of Police
- Henry Gibson as Train Conductor
- John Hillerman as Sir Francis Commarty
- Rick Jason as Cornelius Vanderbilt
- Christopher Lee as Stuart
- Patrick Macnee as Ralph Gautier
- John Mills as Faversham
- Pernell Roberts as Captain Speedy
- Cassie Stuart as Madelaine
- James Sikking as Jenks
- Simon Ward as Flannigan
- John Abineri as Father Gruber
- Yves Aubert as Gravier
- Bill Bailey as Captain Phillips
- Peter Birrel as Brindisi Terminal Clerk
- John Carlin as Forster
- Jean-Pierre Castaldi as Lenoir
- Lane Cooper as Kyaukese
- Julian Curry as Wilson
- Ellis Dale as Bank Clerk
- Bruce Troy Davis as Captain Lacey
- Edward Dentith as Faversham's Aide
- Hugo De Vernier as Louis Pasteur
- Gérard Dimiglio as Bonheur First Officer
- Roy Evans as 'Shirley Rose' Engineer
- Don Ferguson as Bombay Director of Police
- Henry Fong as Tung Chih
- Michael Gable as Frank James
- Maurice Gardette as French Consul
- Arne Gordon as Bank Guard
- Olivier Hémon as Georges
- Colin Higgins as Reporter
- Mark Holmes as Major Bryce
- George Ip as Tailor
- Subhash Joshi as Indian Gentleman
- Abraham Lee as Carnatic Steamship Clerk
- Michael Lee as Sinji Servant
- Lily Leung as Empress
- Joseph Long as Italian Squad Leader
- Victor Maddern as Liverpool Ticket Agent
- Anna Massey as Queen Victoria
- Ian McNeice as Batcular
- Ajay Mehta as Calcutta Harbor Clerk
- Christopher Muncke as Vanderbilt First Officer
- Pierre Olaf as Captain Rondicherry
- Sai-Kit Yung as Bayfront Hotel Clerk
- Arun Pathela as Kiru
- John Rapley as Reverend Samuel Smythe
- Terrence Scammell as Grimes
- Peter Sharman as English Consul Clerk
- Eve Schickle as The Harlot
- Tommy Tam as Chinese Dockworker
- Theodore Thomas as Police Chief
- Violetta as Mildred
- Ed Wiley as Ffolkestone
- Tariq Yunus as Prince Bayinnaung
- Victor Langley as Minister (uncredited)

== Development ==
Starring Pierce Brosnan as Phileas Fogg, Eric Idle as Passepartout, Julia Nickson as Princess Aouda, and Peter Ustinov as Detective Fix, the miniseries featured multiple cameo appearances, including Patrick Macnee, Simon Ward, and Christopher Lee as members of the Reform Club, and Robert Morley, who had a cameo in the 1956 film adaptation, and Roddy McDowall appear as officials of the Bank of England. Other familiar faces, credited as guest stars and in more substantial roles, include John Mills (who also appeared in the 1956 film version), Jack Klugman, Darren McGavin, John Hillerman and Henry Gibson.

The heroes travel a slightly different route than in the book, and the script makes several contemporary celebrities part of the story who were not mentioned in the book, such as Sarah Bernhardt, Louis Pasteur, Jesse James, Cornelius Vanderbilt, Empress Dowager Cixi, and Queen Victoria.

The miniseries was filmed on location in England, Macau, Hong Kong, Thailand and Yugoslavia.

== Viewership ==
Television ratings for Around the World in 80 Days
No.	Title	Air date	Timeslot (ET)	Rating/share (households)	Viewers (millions)	Ref(s)
1	"Part 1"	April 16, 1989	Sunday 9:00 p.m.	15.5/24	24.4	
2	"Part 2"	April 17, 1989	Monday 9:00 p.m.	13.2/21	19.4	
3	"Part 3"	April 18, 1989	Tuesday 9:00 p.m.	13.0/21	19.3	
