= Around the World in 80 Days (video game) =

2004 video game

- North American cover art depicting the characters Passepartout, Phileas Fogg and Monique La Roche riding the flying machine. The Taj Mahal and the Eiffel Tower are seen in the background.
- Developers: Pick Up & Play (Mobile); Saffire (GBA)
- Publishers: Thumbworks (Mobile); Hip Games, Disney Interactive (GBA)
- Designers: Jeremy Throckmorton; Alex Rushton; Brandon Harmon
- Programmers: Hal Rushton; Deon McClung; Karren Willard
- Platforms: Mobile phone, Game Boy Advance
- Release: Mobile: WW: June 7, 2004; Game Boy Advance: NA: June 22, 2004; EU: October 15, 2004
- Genre: Action-adventure
- Mode: Single-player

Around the World in 80 Days is a platform video game developed by Pick Up & Play for Mobile phones, and Published by Saffire & Disney Interactive for Game Boy Advance, It is based on Walt Disney Pictures and Walden Media's 2004 film of the same name starring Jackie Chan. The game features pre-rendered characters and graphics, and a password feature for returning to specific levels.

Like the film, the game set in the 19th century, and the player assumes the role of Passepartout (portrayed by Jackie Chan), a Chinese valet hired by an eccentric inventor Phileas Fogg (Steve Coogan) in efforts to circumnavigate the world in 80 days.

== Gameplay ==
A screenshot of the train level. The upper left corner shows the player's health. From the bottom of the screen, the number of lives remaining and golden coins, as well as the collection of blue symbols, are shown.

Around the World in 80 Days is a side-scrolling action-adventure game. Set in the 19th century, it features pre-rendered sprites, and follows almost the film's storyline and most of its locations. In the game, the player controls Passepartout, a Chinese valet hired by an inventor Phileas Fogg in attempts to circumnavigate the world in 80 days. During gameplay, the player encounters various enemies along the way, including warriors sent by General Fang. There are four blue symbols scattered throughout each level; the player must collect all four of these symbols in order to advance to the next level. Collecting them also increases the length of the health bar. The health bar depletes when being attacked by enemies or traps; when emptied, one of the remaining lives—dubbed as "vials" in-game—is used automatically. An extra vial is granted if the player collects 80 golden coins scattered throughout the game.

The Game Boy Advance's R, A and B buttons are used for kicking, punching and jumping, respectively. Pressing the Select button at any point will display the controls. Passepartout can perform various actions, such as sliding, jumping from wall to wall, and grabbing ledges. The player can also attack while jumping or crouching. The game uses a password function, which allows the player to return to a specific level in the game.

== Development and release ==
A video game based on the film Around the World in 80 Days starring Jackie Chan was developed for the Game Boy Advance by Saffire, a game studio based in American Fork, Utah. It was designed by Jeremy Throckmorton, Alex Rushton and Brandon Harmon; and programmed by Hal Rushton, Deon McClung and Karren Willard. Saffire utilized a technique to render digitized sprites, as done on their video game adaptation of the 2004 film, Van Helsing. The game was announced by its publisher Hip Games in May 2004, stating that it would ship with the film's release in North America on June 22, 2004. The European version was released on October 15, 2004.

== Reception ==
Reception

Aggregate scores
Aggregator	Score	
Aggregator	GBA	mobile
GameRankings	38%	45%
Metacritic	40/100	N/A

Review scores
Publication	Score	
Publication	GBA	mobile
GameSpot	N/A	3.6/10
GameZone	7/10	N/A
IGN	3.5/10	6.5/10
Nintendo Power	2.4/5	N/A

According to the review aggregation website Metacritic, the Game Boy Advance version received "generally unfavorable reviews". Marc Nix of IGN described the gameplay as "a slobberknocker" and stated that fighting with boss characters are "just slugfests, some of which may prove too difficult to brawl through for young gamers even though the rest of the game is a cakewalk." However, Levi Buchanan of the same site said that the mobile version "isn't even close to being the worse movie game on cellphones, but it's a far shot from the best. Average to the core, and likely not worth your download dollars." Tim Ceradsky of GameZone wrote a positive review. He noted that the GBA version is "easy enough that kids will enjoy playing it", and praised its graphics, which "looks very good for the GBA".
