= Around the World in 80 Days (2021 TV series) =

TV series

- Genre: Drama; Adventure
- Created by: Ashley Pharoah; Caleb Ranson
- Based on: Around the World in Eighty Days by Jules Verne
- Written by: Ashley Pharoah, Caleb Ranson, Claire Downes, Stephen Greenhorn, lan Jarvis, Stuart Lane, Peter McKenna, Debbie O'Malley, Jessica Ruston
- Starring: David Tennant; Ibrahim Koma; Leonie Benesch
- Composers: Hans Zimmer; Christian Lundberg
- Countries of origin: France; Germany; Italy; United Kingdom; South Africa
- Original languages: English; French; Italian
- No. of series: 1
- No. of episodes: 8

Production
- Executive producers: Simon Crawford-Collins; Lionel Uzan; Pascal Breton; Winnie Serite; Ashley Pharoah; Steve Barron; David Tennant; Caleb Ranson
- Producer: Peter McAleese
- Running time: 48 minutes
- Production companies: Slim Film + Television; Federation Studios; Peu Communications

Original release
- Network: PBS; BBC One; France 2; ZDF; RAI
- Release: 26 December 2021 – 30 January 2022

Around the World in 80 Days is a historical drama adventure television series based on the 1872 Jules Verne novel of the same name, in which, for a bet, Phileas Fogg travels the world in 80 days by various means both traditional and new. The series first premiered on La Une in Belgium, on 5 December 2021, and later on BBC One in the United Kingdom on 26 December 2021.

In November 2021, ahead of the premiere, it was announced the programme had been renewed for a second season. However, in October 2024, it was reported that there were no current plans for further seasons beyond the first.

== Premise ==
The story is about Phileas Fogg making a £20,000 (equivalent to £1,579,052 in 2021) wager with his boyhood friend and fellow member of the prestigious Reform Club that he can circumnavigate the world in 80 days, joined by his new valet Passepartout and journalist Abigail Fix. Although the story is fictional, real-life people such as Adolphe Thiers, Jane Digby and Bass Reeves are portrayed interacting with the fictional characters.

== Cast and characters ==
=== Main ===
- David Tennant as Phileas Fogg
- Ibrahim Koma as Jean Passepartout
- Leonie Benesch as Abigail Fix Fortescue

=== Recurring ===
- Jason Watkins as Bernard Fortescue, Abigail's father and Fogg's friend
- Peter Sullivan as Nyle Bellamy, Fogg's rival
- Richard Wilson as Grayson, Fogg's butler
- Leon Clingman as Roberts, maitre d'hôtel at Reform Club
- Anthony Flanagan as Thomas Kneedling, Bellamy's henchman
- Jeff Rawle as Hughes, Bank manager in London
- David Sherwood as Samuel Fallentin, a Reform Club member

=== Guest ===
- André Penvern as Monsieur Lome, inventor of a balloon
- Alain Guillo as Adolphe Thiers, President of France
- Geo Dobre as Chief of Police in Paris
- Masali Baduza as Edith, employee at the Reform club
- Giovanni Scifoni as Niccolò Moretti, an Italian industrialist
- Simone Coppo as Marco, conductor of the train Turin - Brindisi
- Alexandru Bindea as train driver
- Ilinca Hărnuț as an Italian mother travelling in 3rd class
- Lindsay Duncan as Jane Digby, an Englishwoman
- Faical Elkihel as Sheik Medjuel El Mezjuel Mezrab, Jane's husband
- Shivaani Ghai as Aouda, an Indian woman
- Patrick Kennedy as Sir Henry Rowbotham, British Governor in Hong Kong
- Victoria Smurfit as Lady Clemency Rowbotham, Sir Henry's wife
- Thomas Chaanhing as Jiang Liei, Passepartout's former boss in Hong Kong
- Susan Danford as Mrs. Hildreth, Lady Clemency's friend
- Sean Cameron Michael as chief bank manager
- Gary Beadle as Bass Reeves, US Deputy Marshal
- John Light as Ambrose Abernathy, former confederate colonel and Ku Klux Klan member
- Elena Saurel as Sally, the stagecoach's driver
- Bogdan Farcaș as barman in Battle Mountain
- Dolly Wells as Estella, Fogg's former love
- Dominic Carter as the customs officer in Liverpool
- Ty Tennant as the gang leader in New York
- Ionuț Grama as officer in the ship New York - Liverpool
- James Dutton as Henry, the arrogant man on the ship

== Episodes ==
No.	Episode	Directed by	Written by	Original UK air date	UK viewers (millions)
1	Episode 1	Steve Barron	Ashley Pharoah and Caleb Ranson	26 December 2021	5.89
Phileas Fogg is a man of routine, spending every day at the Reform Club reading his newspaper and eating the same meal. On 5 October 1872 he finds himself engrossed in an article by Abigail Fix about a new railroad in India that now allows one to travel round the world in 80 days, and recalls a postcard he has received that carried a single word, "coward". His friend Nyle Bellamy goads him into declaring that he will undertake this journey, and they bet 20,000 pounds that Fogg will return by Christmas Eve. Together with a new French servant Jean Passepartout, he sails to France. Abigail follows them to report on his travels for her father's newspaper. In Paris, prevented from boarding the train to Turin, Fogg inadvertently foils an assassination attempt by the rebels of the Paris Commune (led by Passepartout's brother) on Adolphe Thiers, the President of France. The three companions are forced to flee in a hot air balloon.
2	Episode 2	Steve Barron	Ashley Pharoah; Story by : Caleb Ranson	26 December 2021	5.41
Having crossed the Alps by balloon, Fogg and his party crash-land near Florence and hail a train going to Brindisi in order to catch a boat to Egypt. During the journey, Fogg meets industrialist Niccolò Moretti and befriends his son Alberto, with whom he shares an interest in scientific inventions. When the train emergency brakes at a damaged bridge, Alberto is critically injured. Brindisi, two hours away, is the closest place they can get help, and Fogg convinces Moretti that it is possible for the engine and one carriage to go over the rails still in place above the gap. The train successfully crosses the bridge and, using the carriage's wooden components as fuel, they arrive in Brindisi in time to save the child. Fogg and his companions continue to Aden via the Suez Canal.
3	Episode 3	Steve Barron	Ashley Pharoah	2 January 2022	5.21
Forced to stop in Al Hudaydah, Fogg is tricked by a local who claims he could safely lead them across the Empty Quarter to Aden. Believing the desert too dangerous for women, Fogg and Passepartout leave Abigail behind. When their guide robs and strands them, they are rescued by Jane Digby and her husband, a sheik, who Abigail has persuaded to assist. Initially reluctant to take Fogg to Aden, the couple agrees after the travellers help them fend off some raiders, with Passepartout shooting dead the one trying to abduct Abigail. In Aden, Mr. Kneedling, a man hired by Bellamy, bribes Passepartout to slow Fogg down by giving him a substance he claims would make Fogg sleep for a few days.
4	Episode 4	Steve Barron	Ashley Pharoah, Claire Downes, Ian Jarvis and Stuart Lane	2 January 2022	4.69
Stuck in an Indian village after the railroad Abigail wrote about turned out to be still incomplete, Fogg is forced to stay the night because of a wedding. When the groom is arrested for deserting the British Indian Army, the bride's mother, Aouda, tells Fogg she will only provide a guide if he saves Arjan. He invites the groom's young lieutenant to tea, but Passepartout has already spiked Fogg's drink with an excessive dose of the drugs from Aden. Fogg gets delirious, and the meeting is a disaster. Later, mistaking Abigail for his lost love Estella, he bares his heart to her, which Abigail includes in her new article. Everyone works together to save Fogg's life. In the morning, Fogg recovers and speaks for Arjan at the court martial, making a speech about the power of love and managing to convince the lieutenant to dishonourably discharge him instead of deporting him to Malacca.
5	Episode 5	Brian Kelly	Ashley Pharoah and Jessica Ruston; Story by : Debbie O'Malley	9 January 2022	5.09
In the British colony of Hong Kong, Kneedling tells the bank that Fogg is a wanted criminal and convinces them to withhold his money. The governor's wife has read Abigail's reports in the paper and throws a party in Fogg and his companions' honour. Fogg tries to exploit the occasion and persuade the governor to lend him the money needed to travel to Japan. Meanwhile, also looking for funds, Passepartout visits an old acquaintance who contracts him to steal a priceless white jade heirloom from the governor's house. Fogg escapes the party after discovering that Abigail has written about his private life without asking. Passepartout takes the artifact. Hearing that Fogg might be a criminal, the governor orders Fogg's arrest for the theft, and the money Passepartout was paid is found under his bed. Fogg protests his innocence, but gets sentenced to be flogged without trial. Abigail and Passepartout manage to secure a pardon, but only reach the prison as Fogg receives the first lash.
6	Episode 6	Steve Barron	Peter McKenna	16 January 2022	5.36
Frustrated so far, Kneedling confronts Fogg on the ship to Yokohama and puts the three companions in a lifeboat. After a stormy night at sea, they find themselves marooned on an uninhabited island. Abigail organises them to start looking for food, water and shelter. Fogg confesses to Abigail that he and Estella were supposed to travel the world together, but he panicked at the last minute and turned back, while she carried on alone. He has regretted it ever since. After it is revealed what Passepartout did in both India and Hong Kong, Fogg orders him away. Repenting, Passepartout finishes the raft Fogg has been building and ends up sick after working in the rain. Fogg and Abigail tend to him, using the raft for firewood to keep him warm. They are rescued by a passing British steamer on its way to the United States.
7	Episode 7	Charles Beeson	Stephen Greenhorn	23 January 2022	5.57
Travelling from San Francisco to the next station to catch their train east, the group's stage coach is commandeered by US Deputy Marshall Bass Reeves, escorting a Southern war criminal and Klan member to stand trial in Louisiana. At Battle Mountain, their destination, the captive's friends stage a rescue. Abigail saves her companions by riding a horse into a saloon, and Fogg stops the criminal. Meanwhile in England, Bellamy hears about Fogg's death at sea and, facing bankruptcy, pressures the grieving Fortescue into releasing Fogg's money as the executor of his will, but Abigail's telegram arrives saying that they are still alive and heading to New York City.
8	Episode 8	Steve Barron	Ashley Pharoah	30 January 2022	6.07
In New York, Fogg is met by press as a celebrity. He realizes that the "coward" postcard depicts the Grand Central Depot, and that Estella must have sent it. He boards a ship to England, but then hurries back to the station. Estella appears as he is about to leave, and they share their life stories. She encourages him to complete his journey. On his way to the harbour, Fogg is caught by Kneedling, but they get attacked by a street gang. The dying Kneedling hands Fogg proof that Bellamy was trying to sabotage his trip. Landing in England, Fogg is detained because the arrest warrant from Hong Kong had not been rescinded. He spends the night in a cell, convinced he has lost the bet, and returns home dejected, only for his butler to inform him that it is Christmas Eve, not Christmas, since they saved a whole day by going east. Fogg dashes to the Reform Club and arrives at the last second to win the bet. He stands up to Bellamy who leaves in disgrace while the team celebrates their victory. Though happy to be back home in London, they are enticed by another adventure as they read a newspaper's story about a mysterious sea monster attacking ships.

== Production ==
It was commissioned by the European Alliance, a co-production alliance of France Télévisions, ZDF of Germany, and RAI of Italy, with additional co-production partners of Masterpiece (US) and Be-Films/RTBF (Belgium). It was produced in the UK, France and South Africa, with filming also taking place in Romania.

Filming locations included South Africa and Romania. Filming was suspended in March 2020 due to the COVID-19 pandemic, but resumed on 1 October that year. In November 2021, ahead of the premiere, it was announced the series had been renewed for a second series. The main title score is by Hans Zimmer and Christian Lundberg. In October 2024, TVLine reported that a spokesperson from Masterpiece could not "confirm any further seasons" beyond the first.

== Release ==
Around the World in 80 Days first premiered in Belgium on 5 December 2021. ZDF released the complete series online in Germany on 11 December 2021, with an on-air telecast from 21 December to 23 December. The series premiered on France 2 in France on 20 December 2021, and in Norway on NRKs streaming website on 25 December 2021, with linear broadcasting the following days during Boxing Week. In the United Kingdom the series premiered on BBC One on 26 December 2021, and on Masterpiece for PBS in the United States on 2 January 2022. The series premiered on Rai 2 in Italy in January 2024 and simultaneously was streaming on Raiplay. In Greece the show aired on ERT3 in August 2024 at 8:00pm.

== Reception ==
The review aggregator website Rotten Tomatoes reported a 82% approval rating with an average rating of 6.4/10, based on 17 reviews. The website's critical consensus reads, "Around the World in 80 Days sometimes stumbles when it tries to add modern resonance to Jules Verne's globetrotting epic, but the core cast make for terrific travel companions." Metacritic gave the series a weighted average score of 61 out of 100 based on reviews from 16 critics, indicating "generally favorable reviews".

Rebecca Nicholson of The Guardian gave the first episode four out five stars, praising its cast, production values and escapism, but found the episode slow in its setup. The Telegraph gave it three out of five stars. Daniel Fienberg of The Hollywood Reporter felt the plot did not justify eight episodes, but praised Tennant's performance.

Ed Cumming of The Independent gave it two stars, feeling the budget did not do the epic scope of the novel justice. James Delingpole in The Spectator also gave a negative review of the series, complaining about its attempts to speak to contemporary political issues. He criticized the updated characteristics of Fix and Passepartout, as well as inconsistencies such as Passepartout's lack of upset at the death of his brother.
