= Jean Passepartout =

Fictional character created by Jules Verne

- Around the World in Eighty Days character
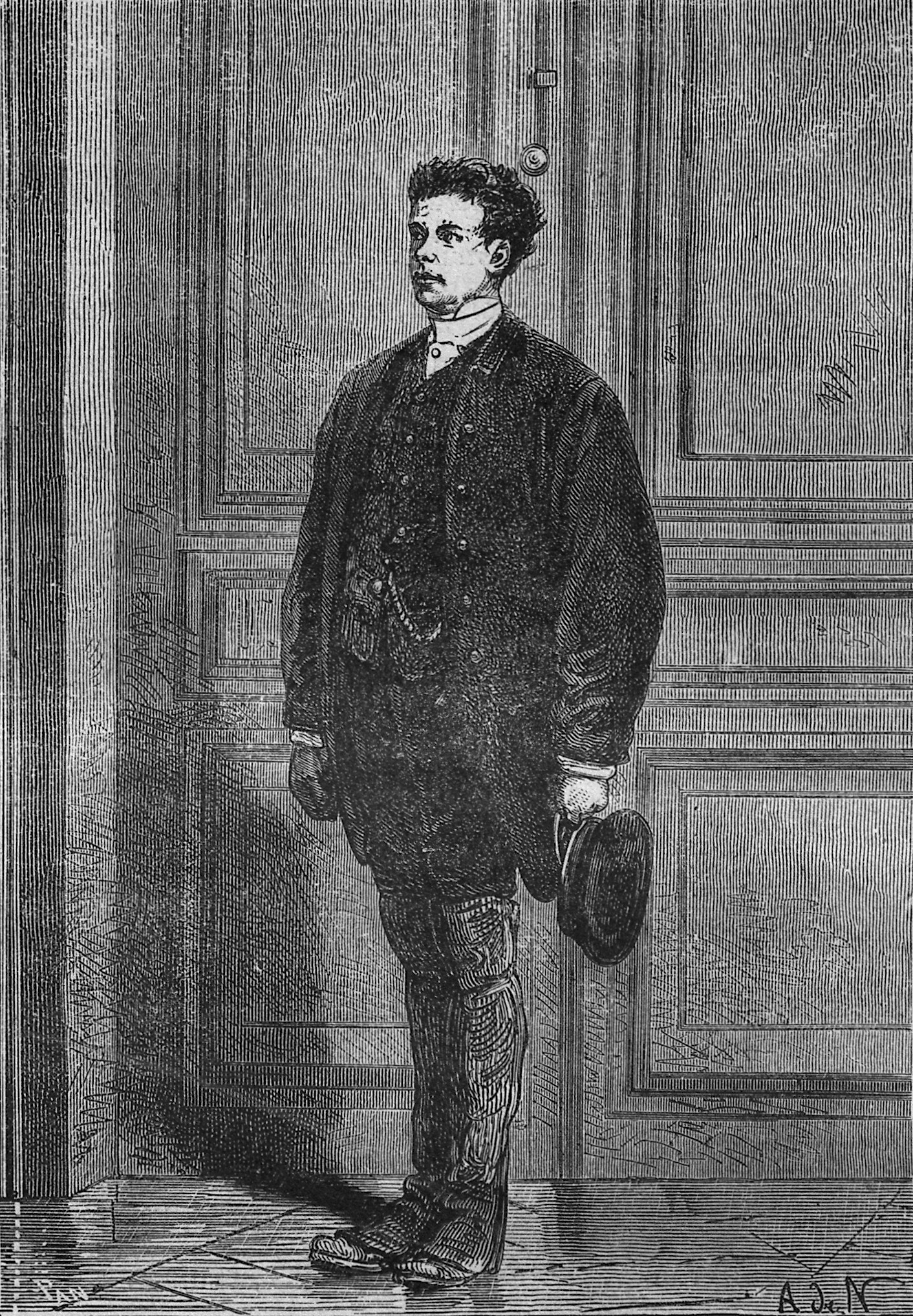
- Jean Passepartout by Alphonse de Neuville & Léon Benett (1873)
- First appearance: Around the World in Eighty Days
- Created by: Jules Verne

In-universe information
- Gender: Male
- Occupation: Valet
- Nationality: French

Jean Passepartout (French: [ʒɑ̃ paspaʁtu]) is a fictional character in Jules Verne's novel Around the World in Eighty Days, published in 1873. He is the French valet of the novel's English main character, Phileas Fogg. His surname translates literally to "goes everywhere", but "passepartout" is also an idiom meaning "skeleton key" in French. It can also be understood as a play on the English word passport—or its French equivalent passeport.

== Fictional biography ==
At the beginning of the novel, Passepartout has just been hired by Phileas Fogg after Fogg's previous valet failed to meet his exacting standards on 2 October 1872 at twenty eight minutes past eight. Passepartout, who has lived an irregular and well-travelled life, is looking forward to a restful employment, as Fogg is known for his regular habits which never take him farther afield than the Reform Club.

On Passepartout's first day at work, Fogg makes a bet with his friends at the Club that he can circumnavigate the world within 80 days and Passepartout is obliged to accompany him. In addition to the wager, the valet has an additional incentive to complete the journey quickly: he left a gaslight burning in his room and the resulting expense of wasted gas will be docked from his salary.

During the journey, Passepartout plays a needed role in Fogg's adventures, such as rescuing a young woman named Aouda from a forced sati and becoming a friend of Fix, a police detective who suspects Fogg of robbing a bank. Passepartout learns of Fix's suspicions, but keeps them to himself as he believes Fogg already has enough to worry about concerning his wager, and comes to suspect Fogg may possibly have committed the crime considering the extraordinary spending his master does through the trip's more desperate moments. Due to his silence, however, Fogg and Fix never had a chance to discuss the case in neutral territory, and Fix arrests Fogg as soon as they return to England. This critically delays Fogg before he is exonerated and the company arrives in London, seemingly too late and leaving Passepartout in almost suicidal despair at his foolishness.

The next day home, Aouda proposes to Fogg to help him in his hard life ahead. While searching for a minister to marry the couple, Passepartout discovers that the date is one day earlier than he thought, due to the party having traveled east across the International Date Line. Once Fogg learns of the error, he dashes to the Reform Club and arrives just in time to win the bet.

Fogg marries Aouda, with Passepartout giving away the bride, and divides the net proceeds from the journey between Passepartout and Fix - but not without deducting the cost of the gaslight use from Passepartout's share.

The character Passepartout serves several purposes in the narrative - as a point-of-view character for Verne's French readers and as comic relief, both in his reactions to the strange places and events he encounters, and in a tendency to get trapped, abducted, or, on at least one occasion, left behind.

== Other appearances ==
- In Philip José Farmer's 1973 novel The Other Log of Phileas Fogg, Passepartout is merely a code-name. Like Phileas Fogg, Passepartout is actually an agent of the Eridanians, a race of aliens hiding on Earth and opposed to the Capellans, whose servants include Captain Nemo and Professor Moriarty.
- In Kevin J. Anderson's 2002 novel Captain Nemo: The Fantastic History of a Dark Genius, he is one of the officials captured by Robur during the Crimean War, along with Captain Nemo and Cyrus Smith.

== In other media ==
=== Film ===
- In the 1919 film version, Around the World in Eighty Days, Passepartout was played by Eugen Rex.
- In the 1956 film version, Around the World in 80 Days, Passepartout was played by the actor Cantinflas.
- In the more loosely adapted 2004 film version, Around the World in 80 Days, Passepartout was a Chinese fugitive whose real name is Lau Xing, who took the name to avoid custody by British authorities. He was played by Jackie Chan.

=== Television ===
- In the 1972 animated series, he was voiced by Ross Higgins. This version had a pet monkey named Toto.
- In the 1984 animated adaptation, Around the World with Willy Fog, which depicts the cast as anthropomorphic animals, Passepartout is a cat renamed Rigodon (although he is named Passepartout in some translations), and emphasis is placed on his background as a former circus performer, hence, his desire to get away from a lifestyle that involves much travel. This adaptation also graces Rigodon with a companion in the form of Tico, his circus partner, offering the character someone he can interact with on his own level. Rigodon is voiced by Manuel Peiró in the original Spanish version and Cam Clarke in the dubbed English version of the series. Both Rigodon and Tico also appear in the sequel series Willy Fog 2.
- In the 1989 television mini-series, Around the World in 80 Days, the role is played by Eric Idle.
- In The Secret Adventures of Jules Verne he is played by Michel Courtemanche.
- In the 2008 Rocket! Take Us to the Moon. New From the Earth to the Moon animated series. Jean Passepartout was subtly implied to have a son, whom he put under the care of Phileas and Aouda Fogg. His son is the lead character of the series, with the future Japanese girl Matogawa Eri as both his co-star and love interest. Jean Passepartout was voiced by Watanabe Kazushige (渡辺一茂), while his son was voiced by Sakai Chika (酒井智加).
- In the 2021 television series, from PBS's Masterpiece Theatre, he is played by Ibrahim Koma.

=== Video games ===
- In the 2014 80 Days game based on the book, Passepartout is the player character, accompanying Phileas Fogg around the world in a text based world, designed around a branching plot format.
- In the VR game "Walkabout Mini Golf", a DLC level is based on the book, where in the hard version of the level, the player plays as Passepartout collecting various items for Phileas Fogg.

== See also ==
- Phileas Fogg
