= Around the World in Eighty Days (1919 film) =

1919 silent film by Richard Oswald

- Theatrical release poster by Josef Fenneker
- Directed by: Richard Oswald
- Screenplay by: Richard Oswald
- Based on: Around the World in Eighty Days; 1873 novel by Jules Verne
- Produced by: Richard Oswald
- Starring: Conrad Veidt; Anita Berber; Reinhold Schünzel
- Cinematography: Max Fassbender
- Production company: Richard-Oswald-Produktion
- Release date: 20 March 1919 (Germany)
- Running time: 121 minutes
- Country: Germany
- Language: Silent

Around the World in Eighty Days (German: Die Reise um die Erde in 80 Tagen) is a 1919 German adventure comedy silent film directed and produced by Richard Oswald, based on Jules Verne's 1873 novel of the same name. It stars Conrad Veidt, Anita Berber, and Reinhold Schünzel. It premiered at the Marmorhaus in Berlin on 20 March 1919.

The film was considered lost until 2021 when a print was found at the EYE film Institute in the Netherlands, and was subsequently restored.

== Plot ==
In order to win a bet, British gentleman Phileas Fogg attempts to circle the globe in eighty days, along with his French servant, Passepartout. Fogg is wrongly suspected of having robbed the Bank of England and faces the risk of arrest throughout his journey.

== Cast ==
- Conrad Veidt - Phileas Fogg
- Anita Berber - Aouda
- Reinhold Schünzel - Archibald Corsican
- Eugen Rex - Passepartout
- Max Gülstorff - Detektiv Fix
- Käte Oswald - Nemea
- Paul Morgan - John Forster
