= J. Willis Sayre =

American theatre critic

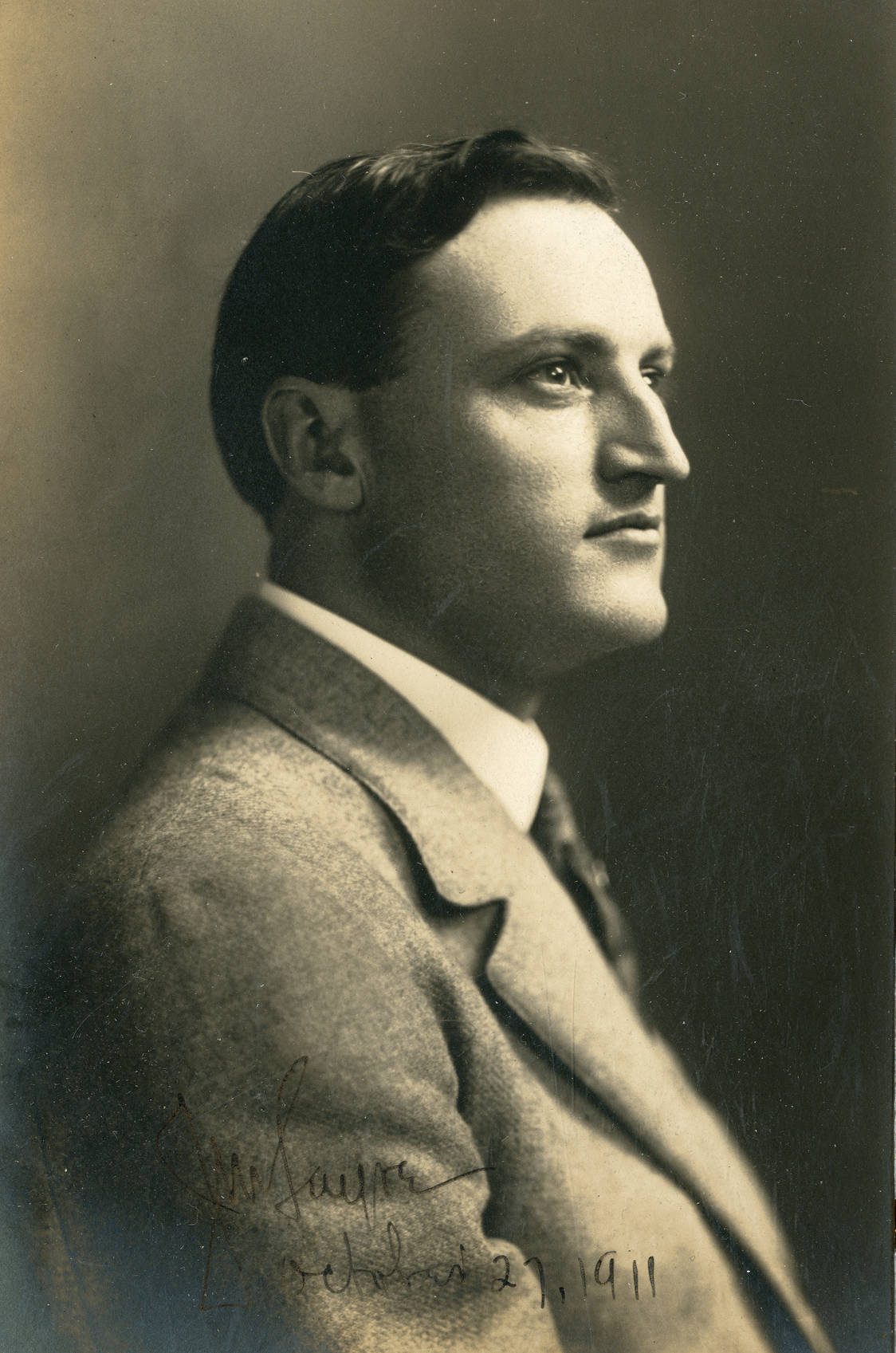
Sayre in 1911

James Willis Sayre (December 31, 1877 – January 11, 1963) was an American theatre critic, journalist, arts promoter, and historian. A longtime resident of Seattle, Washington, Sayre was an influential figure in writing and conserving the history of theatre in the city.

== Personal life ==
James Willis Sayre was born in Washington, D.C. His father, James Mathew Sayre, served in the Union Army during the American Civil War. His mother, Maria Burrows Sayre, was a field nurse for the Confederacy. The Sayre family relocated to the Pacific Northwest sometime around 1890.

At the turn of the century, Sayre left Seattle to fight in the Spanish–American War in the Philippines. After his return, he lobbied local officials to rename City Park, located on Capitol Hill, to Volunteer Park to honor the volunteers of the Spanish–American War. A 1901 ordinance changed the name.

Emulating Jules Verne's Phileas Fogg, in 1903 he set the world record for circling the earth using public transportation exclusively, completing his trip in 54 days 9 hours and 42 minutes.

Sayre married Pearl Myrtle Shakelford Sayre (January 4, 1884 – May 23, 1978) in 1904. They had one child, Elinore Pearl Sayre (January 21, 1906 – September 12, 1992), who was born in Seattle, King County. Sayre lived in Seattle until 1959, when he moved to Santa Cruz, California due to failing health. He died at the age of 86.

== Professional career ==
Sayre's involvement with the theatre began around 1891 when he took a job at the Seattle Opera House folding programs. In 1899, Sayre began working as an advertising director for theater manager John Cort and soon opened Seattle's first theatrical advertising agency. In late 1907, he began his career as a theatrical critic with one of Seattle’s weekly papers, The Argus. He worked briefly for the Seattle Star in 1909, then returned to the Seattle Daily Times, where he edited the paper’s theatrical department and wrote reviews. He worked as the manager of the Seattle Symphony from 1908 to 1909. From 1924 to 1936 he worked as an independent promoter of theatre productions and films and wrote several books on the history of Seattle. One of these books, This City of Ours, was a standard history text in Seattle public schools for many years.

In 1936, he joined the staff of the Seattle Post-Intelligencer, where he eventually managed the theatrical department. He retired from this position in 1954 after suffering a small stroke.

Over the course of his career, Sayre worked as a theatrical critic and editor for several of the local newspapers and magazines and is known to have handled publicity and advertising for a variety of Seattle theaters including the Grand Opera House, Seattle Theatre, Lyceum, Palm Garden, Second Avenue Orpheum, Star, Alhambra, Majestic, Mission, Liberty, 5th Avenue Theatre, Coliseum, Rex, Strand, Pantages, Blue Mouse, and Music Box Theatres. On several occasions, Sayre’s role as an arts promoter and theatrical critic became blurred. For example, while he was the manager of the Seattle Symphony he was also writing for various Seattle newspapers and reviewing Symphony performances. This apparent conflict of interest was not controversial at the time.

Sayre compiled a vast collection of publicity photographs from theatrical performers, dramatic companies, musicians, and traveling shows that played in Seattle as well as theater and musical programs. This collection is housed at the University of Washington Libraries Special Collection Division.

== Notable accomplishments ==
Early in Sayre's journalistic career, he set out to recreate the journey of Jules Verne's Phileas Fogg. Willis Sayre accomplished the feat of circumnavigating the globe in 54 days, 9 hours and 42 minutes, which was a record-breaking journey particularly considering his self-imposed limitation of using only public transport. Fortunately, he did have the benefit of the newly opened Trans-Siberian Railway. His objective was to travel as any citizen would, without special or chartered transportation. In fact, he turned down an opportunity to ride a chartered train funded by friends and local supporters in St. Paul, Minnesota that would have taken him directly to Seattle and instead traveled the Northern Pacific route out of Chicago, which cost him several hours. He was known to be openly critical of other travelers who broke his record but who made the trip without this limitation. Sayre wrote in the Post-Intelligencer, "It seemed obvious to me that . . . a trip around the world became merely a question of who had the most money to spend on it."

His return to Seattle was met with a hero's welcome, and he reflected on his experience and the mistakes he made while traveling in the evening news.

== Works ==
- Sayre, J. Willis, The Romance of Second Avenue, Seattle: J. Willis Sayre, 1933.
- Sayre, J. Willis, This City of Ours, Seattle: Seattle School District No.1, 1936.
- Sayre, J. Willis, Some Historical Spots in Western Washington, Seattle: J. Willis Sayre, 1936.
- Sayre, J. Willis, The Early Waterfront of Seattle, Seattle: J. Willis Sayre, 1937.
