= Terrence Scammell (British actor) =

British stage and television actor (born 1937)

- Born: 1 March 1937 (age 89); London, England, United Kingdom
- Other names: Terry Scammell, Terence Scammell
- Occupations: Actor, artistic director

Terrence Scammell (born 1 March 1937) is a British stage and television actor. In his early career, he performed extensively at the renowned American Shakespeare Festival in Stratford, Connecticut, including a starring role as Romeo in Shakespeare's Romeo and Juliet. He was also a founder and artistic director of the Los Angeles Free Shakespeare Festival.

He has also worked in television and film, with credits on mini-series such as Around the World in 80 Days and Kidnapped, and films such as The Mephisto Waltz and The Lindbergh Kidnapping Case.

== Stage ==
- Artistic Director/Founder, Los Angeles Free Shakespeare Festival, Los Angeles (1975-?)
- A Comedy of Errors, 1968
- King Lear—1st Volscian Lieutenant (American Shakespeare Theater, Stratford, Connecticut, 1965)
- Romeo and Juliet (1965)—Romeo (American Shakespeare Theater, Stratford, Connecticut, 1965)
- Review from A Shakespeare Encyclopedia
- "Shakespearean Prep School"—pictorial feature in The Free-Lance Star (Fredericksburg, VA), March 15, 1966

== Film and television ==
- Around the World in 80 Days (1989)—Grimes (3 episodes)
- Dallas (1985)—Brad English (1 episode)
- Kidnapped (1978)—Duncansby (2 episodes)
- The Lindbergh Kidnapping Case (1976)—Pound
- The Mephisto Waltz (1971)—Richard
- Murder, She Wrote (1985)—Director (1 episode)
- Police Story
- Yesterday's Child (1977)—Noel Talbot
- The Young Rebels (1970)—Captain Smythe
