= James W. Sullivan =

Art director

- Born: July 17, 1909; Missouri
- Died: October 10, 1974 (aged 65); Los Angeles, California
- Occupation: Art director
- Years active: 1944-1973

James W. Sullivan (July 17, 1909 – October 10, 1974) was an American art director. He was nominated for an Academy Award in the category Best Art Direction for the film Around the World in 80 Days.

== Selected filmography ==
- Around the World in 80 Days (1956)
