= Around the World in 80 Days (2004 film) =

2004 film by Frank Coraci

- American theatrical release poster
- Directed by: Frank Coraci
- Screenplay by: David Titcher; David Benullo; David Goldstein
- Based on: Around the World in Eighty Days; 1873 novel by Jules Verne
- Produced by: Bill Badalato; Hal Lieberman
- Starring: Jackie Chan; Steve Coogan; Cécile de France; Jim Broadbent
- Cinematography: Phil Méheux
- Edited by: Tom Lewis
- Music by: Trevor Jones
- Production companies: Walden Media; Spanknyce Films; Mostow/Lieberman Productions
- Distributed by: Buena Vista Pictures Distribution (Note: Released under the Walt Disney Pictures banner.) (North America); Entertainment Film Distributors (United Kingdom); Universum Film and Buena Vista International (Germany); Summit Entertainment (International)
- Release dates: 13 June 2004 (El Capitan Theatre); 16 June 2004 (United States); 9 July 2004 (United Kingdom and Ireland); 23 December 2004 (Germany)
- Running time: 120 minutes
- Countries: United States; United Kingdom; Germany; Ireland
- Languages: English; Cantonese; French; German; Hindi; Turkish
- Budget: $110 million
- Box office: $72.6 million

Around the World in 80 Days is a 2004 action adventure comedy film directed by Frank Coraci from a script by David Titcher, David Benullo and David Goldstein. It is loosely based on Jules Verne's 1873 novel of the same name, and for comedic reasons, intentionally deviates wildly from the novel and includes a number of anachronistic elements. An international co-production of the United States, United Kingdom, Germany and Ireland, it stars Jackie Chan, Steve Coogan, Cécile de France and Jim Broadbent, with Ewen Bremner, Ian McNeice, Karen Joy Morris, Roger Hammond and David Ryall in supporting roles.

Around the World in 80 Days premiered at the El Capitan Theatre on 13 June 2004 and was released theatrically in the United States on 16 June 2004, the United Kingdom and Ireland on 9 July and Germany on 23 December. The film received mixed reviews from critics and earned $72.6 million worldwide on a $110 million budget.

== Plot ==
Chinese thief Lau Xing robs a Jade Buddha from the Bank of England belonging to Lord Kelvin, head of the Royal Academy of Science, given to him by extremist group the Black Scorpions in exchange for providing military assistance to their cause. Lau Xing seeks refuge with inventor Phileas Fogg, giving his name as "Passepartout", he is hired as Fogg's valet and assists testing his inventions. Fogg's eccentric ways are mocked by members of the Royal Academy and, when he calculates it is possible to circumnavigate the world in eighty days, Kelvin—who stands on tradition over ambition and innovation—offers to vacate his position in favour of Fogg if he is able to do so, but if he can not Fogg must cease scientific pursuits.

Fogg accepts and is joined by Passepartout, who sees the endeavor as a way of returning home. The two journey to Paris, where Fogg encounters impressionist painter Monique La Roche and Passepartout finds he is being pursued by General Fang, who Kelvin has ordered to retrieve the Jade Buddha. Monique flees with the two men in a hot-air balloon, and they continue the journey by train. Monique learns Passepartout's true intentions—that he is travelling with Fogg in order to return the Jade Buddha, which was stolen from his village—and promises to keep his secret if he allows her to continue travelling with them.

Arriving in Istanbul, they are thrown a banquet by Prince Hapi, who seeks to make Monique his seventh wife. Fogg and Passepartout get him to release Monique by threatening to destroy his statue of The Thinker; Hapi agrees but the statue is still broken, and the trio flee for their lives. Kelvin learns that Passepartout is the bank thief and orders colonial authorities in India to arrest him and Fogg. The trio avoid capture by the Black Scorpions and escape to China where Fogg learns the truth about Lau Xing after arriving in his village of Lanzhou. The village is seized by the Black Scorpions and Lau Xing challenges their leader, defeating him with the help of his fellow Ten Tigers of Canton, and the Jade Buddha is returned to the village temple.

Feeling his trust in his companions has been betrayed, Fogg continues on alone and reaches San Francisco, where he has all his money stolen, and days later is found destitute by Lau Xing and Monique, who have followed him. Reunited, the trio cross America, encountering the Wright Brothers testing their prototype flying machine on their way to New York Harbor, where they are ambushed by General Fang. Lau Xing offers to hold her off so Fogg and Monique can board the boat that will get them to London on time; however, they decide to assist him in defeating Fang, but in doing so miss the boat.

The trio board a smaller boat which runs out of coal en route to London, prompting Fogg to construct a flying machine based on the Wright Brothers' plans. The flying machine is catapulted to London, crash-landing outside the Royal Academy. The clock strikes noon and Kelvin proclaims himself the victor, but when his crimes and his attempts to interfere with Fogg are discovered, Queen Victoria has him arrested. Fogg is despondent about having lost the wager until he realizes he did not factor in crossing the International Date Line, realizing while they experienced 80 days, 79 days only passed in London, meaning they arrived back with a day to spare. The Queen appoints Fogg her new Minister of Science, and the rest of London joyously celebrate the trio's success.

== Cast ==
- Jackie Chan as Lau Xing "Passepartout"
- Steve Coogan as Phileas Fogg
- Cécile de France as Monique La Roche
- Jim Broadbent as Lord Kelvin
- Ewen Bremner as Inspector Fix
- Ian McNeice as Colonel Kitchener
- Karen Joy Morris as General Fang
- Roger Hammond as Lord Rhodes
- David Ryall as Lord Salisbury
- Mark Addy as Steamer Captain
- Richard Branson as Balloon Man
- John Cleese as Grizzled Sergeant
- Will Forte as Young Bobby
- Macy Gray as Sleeping French Woman
- Sammo Hung as Wong Fei Hung
- Rob Schneider as San Francisco Hobo
- Luke Wilson as Orville Wright
- Owen Wilson as Wilbur Wright
- Daniel Wu as Bak Mei
- Kathy Bates as Queen Victoria
- Arnold Schwarzenegger as Prince Hapi
- Robert Fyfe as Jean Michel
- Adam Godley as Mr. Sutton
- Kit West as Academy Member #3
- Patrick Paroux as French Ticket Clerk
- Perry Blake as Vincent van Gogh
- Michaël Youn as Art Gallery Manager
- Maggie Q as Female Agent
- Natalie Denise Sperl as Stunning Woman
- Frank Coraci as Angry Dapper Pedestrian
- Phil Meheux as London Hobo

== Production ==
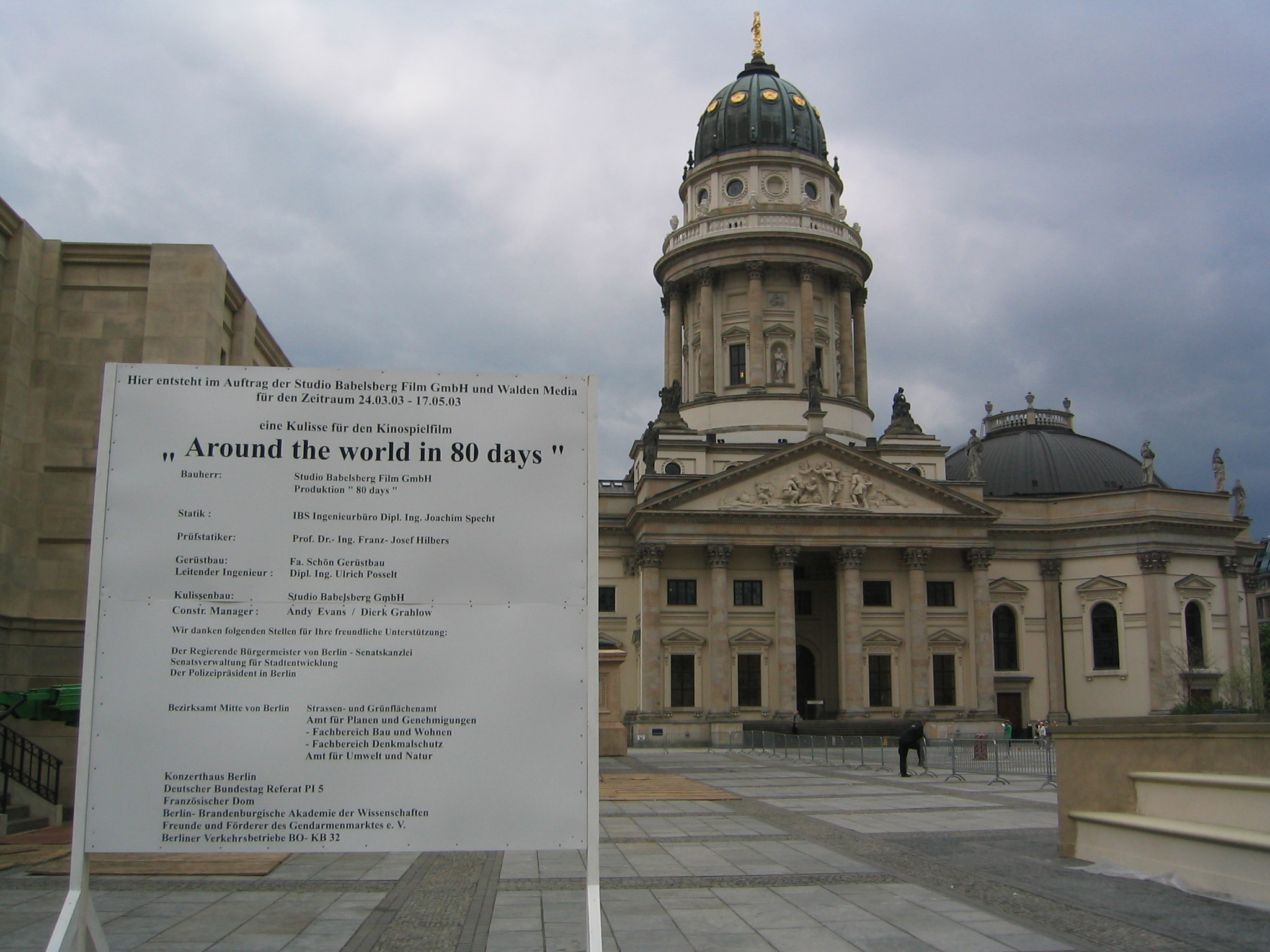
Film set at Berlin's Gendarmenmarkt in April 2003. The building doubles as a background outside the fictional Royal Academy of Science.

Warner Bros., which owned the rights to the 1956 adaptation, planned its own remake with Stephen Sommers directing and Brendan Fraser starring, after the success of The Mummy. Stan Chervin wrote the script for this utilization of the film. Around the same time, 20th Century Fox and Good Machine were developing their own version with Mark Rosenthal and Lawrence Konner writing the screenplay. Ang Lee and Stephen Herek were considered to direct.

When Frank Coraci got involved, he went back to read the original novel and watch the 1956 film, where he realized that the story did not really have a driving lead character. So he decided to rework the plot considerably, which involved giving Phileas Fogg an arc. Coraci's first choice for Fogg was Johnny Depp, but studio executives at the time did not think Depp in a family movie would ever work. Jackie Chan was announced to play Passepartout in June 2002. He was paid about $18 million for the role. After Chan was cast, the filmmakers settled on lesser known character actor Steve Coogan for Fogg. Walden Media was in charge of investing the film while Summit Entertainment handled foreign sales. Paramount Pictures acquired domestic distribution rights, and set a release date for 21 November 2003. However, the studio stepped out at the start of the year, with concerns over the high budget and bankability of the cast.

Principal photography began on 13 March 2003 in Thailand, followed by a three-month shoot at Babelsberg Studio in Berlin. Before Disney had picked up the film for North American distribution, it was one of the highest-budget films produced without a distributor attached.

== Release ==
Around the World in 80 Days premiered at the El Capitan Theatre in Hollywood, California on 13 June 2004, and was released in the United States on 16 June 2004, by Walt Disney Pictures. Summit Entertainment handled international sales of the film. In the United Kingdom and Ireland, Entertainment Film Distributors released the film on 9 July. On 23 December, Universum Film and Buena Vista International released it in Germany.

=== Home media ===
The film was released on DVD and VHS in the United States on 2 November 2004 by Walt Disney Home Entertainment.

== Reception ==
The film received mixed reviews from critics. Rotten Tomatoes gives the film a 32% approval rating, based on 128 reviews, with an average score of 4.79/10, with the site's consensus stating: "Hit-and-miss family fare that bears only the slightest resemblance to Verne's novel." Metacritic gives the film a weighted score of 49 out of 100, based on reviews from 33 critics, indicating "mixed or average" reviews. Audiences polled by CinemaScore gave the film an average grade of "B+" on an A+ to F scale.

The Guardian critic Rob Mackie criticized it for having little to no resemblance to the novel it is based on. Roger Ebert praised it for its visual style and for being "goofy fun". Todd McCarthy of Variety wrote: "Takes plenty of liberties with the material and never generates much genuine excitement, but provides an agreeable ride without overloading it with contemporary filmmaking mannerisms."

In 2014, the Los Angeles Times listed the film as one of the most expensive box office flops of all time.

=== Accolades ===
The film was nominated for two Razzie Awards - Worst Remake or Sequel and Worst Supporting Actor (Arnold Schwarzenegger).

Award	Category	Nominee	Result
Razzie Award	Worst Supporting Actor	Arnold Schwarzenegger	Nominated
Razzie Award	Worst Remake or Sequel	Around the World in 80 Days	Nominated
Stinker Award	Worst Supporting Actor	Arnold Schwarzenegger	Won
Stinker Award	Most Unwelcome Remake	Around the World in 80 Days	Won
