= Aouda =

Fictional character created by Jules Verne

- Around the World in Eighty Days character
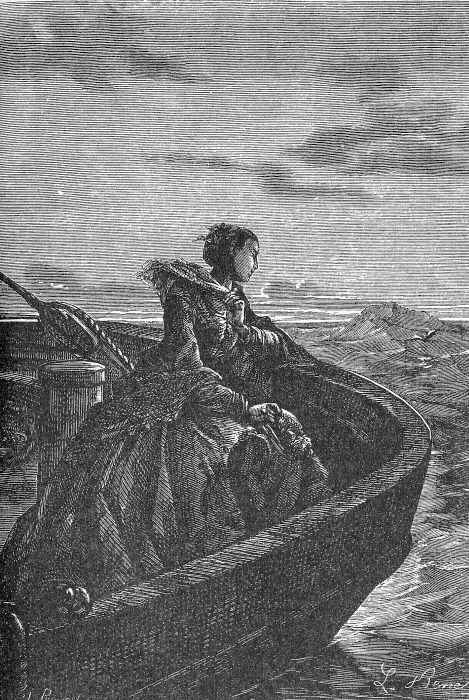
- Aouda by Alphonse de Neuville & Léon Benett (1873)
- First appearance: Around the World in Eighty Days (1872)
- Created by: Jules Verne

In-universe information
- Gender: Female
- Title: Princess
- Spouses: Old Rajah of Bundelkhand (deceased); Phileas Fogg
- Nationality: Indian; British

Aouda (औद / Auda), a character in Around the World in Eighty Days by Jules Verne, is an Indian princess accompanied by Phileas Fogg and Passepartout. The daughter of a Bombay Parsi merchant, she was married against her will to the old raja of Bundelkhand. At the death of her husband, she is about to be sacrificed by her husband's relatives and other people of their society as a sati on her husband's funeral pyre. Upon learning the circumstances of the sati and how this is all against Aouda's will, Fogg and company intervene and rescue her.

At first, Fogg attempts simply to deliver her to relatives along the way on his trip. However, when that proves impossible, she is their permanent companion who becomes more and more attracted to the intriguing and noble Fogg as she shares in the adventures. When they finally reach Britain and appear to have arrived too late to meet the deadline, Aouda fears that she ruined Fogg by causing him delays in his journey, although he firmly denies she was a problem. Now in love with the gentleman and also wishing to help him in his impoverishment, Aouda proposes to Fogg, and he joyously accepts.

As it turns out, this gesture by Aouda saves the day for them all for it prompts Passepartout to discover that by traveling east, they inadvertently arrived in London a day early and now have just enough time to sprint to the Reform Club to win the wager. The company set off for the club and arrive just in time.

Afterward, Aouda offers to end the engagement since the original motivation has been removed. However, Fogg, deeply in love and grateful for all Aouda is and has done for him, will not hear of it and they are happily married with Passepartout having the honor of giving her away at the wedding.

== Adaptations ==
In the novel, Aouda changes out of her traditional sari for a typical European dress provided by Fogg. However, to emphasise the concept of the character as an Indian princess, most adaptations have her keeping her sari at least until the company completes the challenge. In addition, modern adaptations establish that she accompanies Fogg and Passepartout in the final sprint to the Reform Club when it is discovered there is still time to win the wager.

The 1984 animated adaptation, Around the World with Willy Fog, compromises on this detail by having Fog invite Aouda, here an anthropomorphic panther named "Romy", to change out of the dark-coloured funeral sari she was forced to wear for her sati and into a lighter-coloured one which she wears for remainder of the voyage. In the sequel series, Willy Fog 2, Romy eventually dons a European dress that mirrors her old dress' color-scheme although she keeps her Tilaka mark.

== Casting ==
Aouda was played by:

- Shirley MacLaine in the 1956 film adaptation of Around the World in Eighty Days
- Arlene McQuade in the "Have Gun, Will Travel" episode "Fogg Bound"
- Julia Nickson in the 1989 three-part TV mini-series.
- Shivaani Ghai in the 2021 series.
- In the 2004 Disney live action film, Aouda is replaced by Monique La Roche, a French would-be impressionist (played by Cécile de France).
