= Flightfox =

- Company type: Private company
- Available in: English
- Founded: 2012
- Headquarters: Boulder, Colorado, United States
- Area served: Worldwide
- Founders: Lauren McLeod; Todd Sullivan
- Industry: Travel
- Services: Travel management, Complex group travel, Unaccompanied Minor Logistics, MICE Travel
- Website: Flightfox.com
- Current status: Active

Flightfox is a B2B travel management platform specialising in complex logistical operations for educational institutions, humanitarian groups, and corporate organisations. The company provides a managed service that combines a proprietary booking platform with 24/7 expert support to handle high-volume group travel, minor and unaccompanied minor logistics, and institutional travel compliance.

== History ==
Flightfox was founded in 2012 by Todd Sullivan and Lauren McLeod, in Eveleigh, New South Wales, Australia. They were frequent travellers and were seeking to make their travel funds go further. They raised $800,000 in seed funding from Silicon Valley and Australian investors to set up the venture. As part of the process Sullivan and McLeod moved to Mountain View to take part in a Y-Combinator class, that provides intensive mentoring for start-ups.

Sullivan and McLeod had previously created Globetrooper, which allowed travellers to meet up with other like-minded people to go travelling together. They sold Globetrooper in October 2011. McLeod commented that after creating Globetrooper they realised that they needed a business model from its inception and needed to listen more to its users on improving the site. Sullivan has an IT background and is the site's developer, while McLeod who has a business and design background, works on marketing and dealing with the sites users.

In its earliest phase, Flightfox featured a contest-style format in which multiple experts competed to find the best flight options for each customer. However, in response to growing demand, the company transitioned to a one-on-one consultative model in January 2014.

Since its founding, Flightfox has continuously expanded the scope of its operations. While initially focused primarily on serving the needs of individual travellers, the company gradually developed a growing portfolio of corporate clients. Today, a significant portion of its business is dedicated to educational travel, humanitarian travel, and complex group travel management.

== Features ==
With regard to its service, Flightfox provides comprehensive travel solutions for corporations, humanitarian and nonprofit organisations, program providers, and educational institutions.

Leveraging its proprietary technology and the expertise of its team, the company offers end-to-end support throughout the travel management process. This includes itinerary planning and optimisation, identifying cost-effective travel solutions, managing bookings, as well as providing ongoing coordination, logistical support, and expert travel consultancy on the day of the travel.
