= Around the World in 80 Days (1956 film) =

1956 film by Michael Anderson

- Theatrical release poster
- Directed by: Michael Anderson
- Screenplay by: James Poe; John Farrow; S.J. Perelman
- Based on: Around the World in Eighty Days; 1873 novel by Jules Verne
- Produced by: Michael Todd
- Starring: David Niven; Cantinflas; Robert Newton; Shirley MacLaine
- Cinematography: Lionel Lindon
- Edited by: Gene Ruggiero; Howard Epstein
- Music by: Victor Young
- Production company: Michael Todd Company
- Distributed by: United Artists
- Release dates: October 17, 1956 (New York City); December 22, 1956 (Los Angeles)
- Running time: 182 minutes
- Country: United States
- Language: English
- Budget: $6 million
- Box office: $42 million

Around the World in 80 Days (sometimes spelled as Around the World in Eighty Days) is a 1956 American epic adventure-comedy film starring David Niven, Cantinflas, Robert Newton, and Shirley MacLaine, produced by the Michael Todd Company and released by United Artists.

The picture was directed by Michael Anderson and produced by Mike Todd, with Kevin McClory and William Cameron Menzies as associate producers. The screenplay, based on the classic 1873 novel of the same name by Jules Verne, was written by James Poe, John Farrow and S.J. Perelman. The music score was composed by Victor Young and the Todd-AO 70 mm cinematography (processed by Technicolor) was by Lionel Lindon. The film's six-minute-long animated title sequence, shown at the end of the film, was created by award-winning designer Saul Bass.

The film won five Academy Awards, including Best Picture.

== Plot ==
Broadcast journalist Edward R. Murrow presents an onscreen prologue, featuring footage from A Trip to the Moon (1902) film made by Georges Méliès, explaining that it is based loosely on the book From the Earth to the Moon by Jules Verne. Also included is the launching of an unmanned rocket and footage of the earth receding.

In 1872, an English gentleman Phileas Fogg claims he can circumnavigate the world in eighty days. Met with scepticism, he makes a £20,000 wager (worth about £2 million today) with four fellow members of the Reform Club (each contributing £5,000 to the bet) that he can make the journey and arrive back at the club eighty days from exactly 8:45 pm that evening.

Together with his resourceful French valet, Passepartout, Fogg goes hopscotching around the globe generously spending money to encourage others to help him get to his destinations faster so he can accommodate tight steamship schedules. Having reached Paris they hear that a tunnel under the Alps is blocked. The Thomas Cook agent who assists them offers to hire or sell them his gas-filled balloon. Fogg buys it and they fly over the Alps drinking champagne.

Blown off-course, the two accidentally end up in Spain, where we see a table-top flamenco sequence performed in a bar. Later, Passepartout engages in a comic bullfight. Next, they go to Brindisi in Italy. Meanwhile, back in London, suspicion grows that Fogg has stolen £55,000 (around £5.4 million today) from the Bank of England so Police Inspector Fix is sent out by Scotland Yard to trail him (starting in Suez) but must keep waiting for a warrant to arrive so he can arrest Fogg in the British-controlled ports they visit.

In India, Fogg and Passepartout rescue a beautiful young widow Aouda from being forced into a funeral pyre with her late husband. The three then travel to Hong Kong, Yokohama, San Francisco, and the Wild West (including the Sioux Nation, one was peaceful and the other are fearsome). Reaching New York by their man-made sailing railcar, they arrange their passage on a cargo steamship travelling to Venezuela – Fogg bribes the captain to go to England. Alas, they run out of coal mid-ocean and the ship stops. Fogg buys the ship and then instructs the crew to take everything that burns, including lifeboats, to provide fuel.

They arrive in Liverpool, where, still with just enough time left to travel to London and win his wager, Fogg is promptly arrested by the diligent yet misguided Inspector Fix.

Detaining Fogg at the police station, the embarrassed Fix discovers that the real culprit has already been apprehended by police in Brighton. Although Fogg is exculpated and free to go, he now has insufficient time to reach London before his deadline, and so has lost everything but the enduring love of the winsome Aouda. Upon returning to London, Fogg asks Passepartout to arrange a church wedding for the next day, Monday. Salvation comes when Passepartout is shocked to be informed that the next day is actually Sunday. Fogg then realizes that by traveling east towards the rising sun and crossing the International Date Line, he has gained a day. Thus, there is still just enough time to reach the Reform Club and win the bet. Fogg rushes to the club, arriving just before the 8:45 pm chime. Passepartout and Aouda then arrive behind him, inadvertently shocking everyone, as no woman has ever entered the Reform Club before.

== Cast ==
- David Niven as Phileas Fogg
- Cantinflas as Passepartout
- Shirley MacLaine as Princess Aouda
- Robert Newton as Inspector Fix

=== Cameo appearances ===
- Edward R. Murrow as the prologue narrator
- Finlay Currie as Andrew Stuart, Reform Club member
- Robert Morley as Gauthier Ralph, Reform Club member and Bank of England Governor
- Ronald Squire as a Reform Club member
- Basil Sydney as a Reform Club member
- Noël Coward as Roland Hesketh-Baggott, London employment agency manager
- Sir John Gielgud as Foster, Fogg's former valet
- Trevor Howard as Denis Fallentin, Reform Club member
- Harcourt Williams as Hinshaw, a Reform Club steward
- Martine Carol as a girl in the Paris railway station
- Fernandel as a Paris coachman
- Charles Boyer as Monsieur Gasse, balloonist
- Evelyn Keyes as a Paris flirt
- Jose Greco & Troupe as a flamenco dancer
- Luis Dominguin as a bullfighter
- Gilbert Roland as Achmed Abdullah
- Cesar Romero as Abdullah's henchman
- Alan Mowbray as the British Consul at Suez
- Sir Cedric Hardwicke as Sir Francis Cromarty
- Melville Cooper as Mr. Talley, steward on the RMS Rangoon
- Reginald Denny as a Bombay police inspector
- Ronald Colman as a Great Indian Peninsular Railway official
- Robert Cabal as an elephant driver-guide
- Charles Coburn as a Hong Kong steamship company clerk
- Peter Lorre as a steward on the SS Carnatic
- George Raft as the bouncer of the Barbary Coast Saloon
- Red Skelton as a drunk at the saloon
- Marlene Dietrich as the saloon hostess
- John Carradine as Col. Stamp Proctor of San Francisco
- Frank Sinatra as the saloon pianist
- Buster Keaton as a train conductor (San Francisco to Fort Kearney)
- Col. Tim McCoy as a US Cavalry Colonel
- Joe E. Brown as the Fort Kearney stationmaster
- Andy Devine as the first mate of the SS Henrietta
- Edmund Lowe as the engineer of the SS Henrietta
- Victor McLaglen as the helmsman of the SS Henrietta
- Jack Oakie as the Captain of the SS Henrietta
- Beatrice Lillie as a London revivalist leader
- John Mills as a London carriage driver
- Glynis Johns as a Sporting Lady
- Hermione Gingold as a Sporting Lady
- A. E. Matthews as a Reform Club member
- Ronald Adam as a Reform Club steward
- Walter Fitzgerald as a Reform Club member
- Frank Royde as a clergyman
- Frederick Leister as a Reform Club member (uncredited)
- Mike Mazurki as a Hong Kong drunk (uncredited)
- Richard Wattis as Inspector Hunter of Scotland Yard (uncredited)
- Keye Luke as an old man at Yokohama travel office (uncredited)
- Felix Felton as a Reform Club member (uncredited)
- Philip Ahn as Hong Kong citizen (uncredited)
- Marion Ross (uncredited)
- James Dime

== Production ==
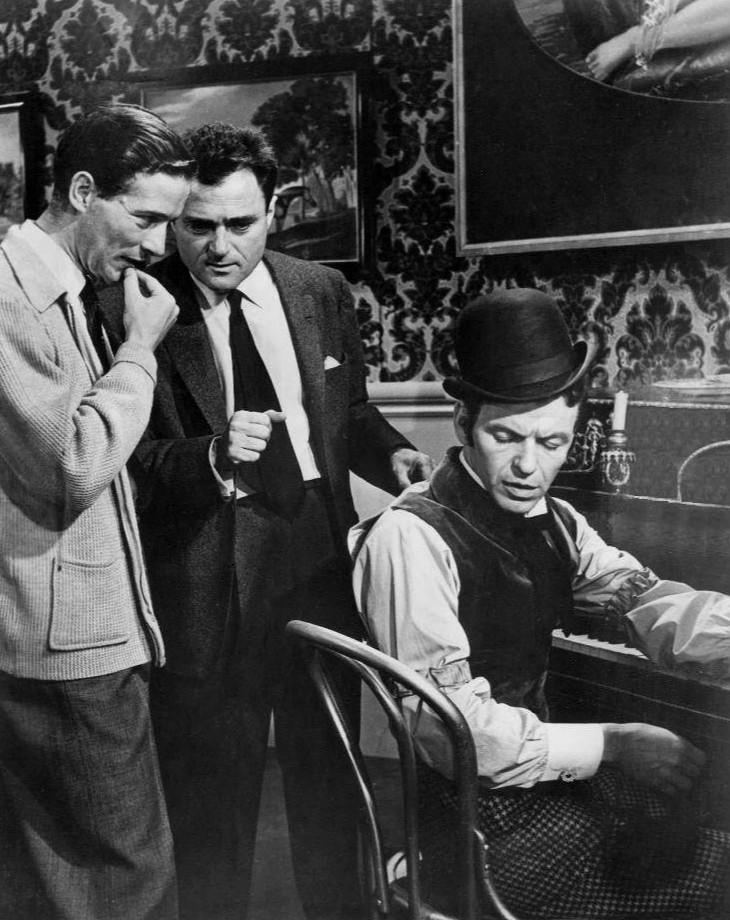
Michael Anderson, Michael Todd and Frank Sinatra on set

Around the World in 80 Days was produced by Broadway showman Michael Todd, based on a musical by Orson Welles and Jules Verne's adventure novel. Todd had never before produced a film. The director he hired, Michael Anderson, had directed the highly acclaimed British World War II feature The Dam Busters (1955), George Orwell's Nineteen Eighty-Four feature (1956), and other classic films. Todd sold his interest in the Todd-AO format to help finance the film.

Because Todd-AO ran at 30 frames per second, which was incompatible with the 35mm standard of 24 fps, Around the World in 80 Days was filmed twice, like the first feature in Todd-AO, Oklahoma!. Unlike Oklahoma!, however, which was filmed additionally in 35mm CinemaScope, Around the World in 80 Days was filmed simultaneously in Todd-AO at 24 frames per second so that from this negative, 35mm reduction prints could be produced for general release. After these two films, the specification for Todd-AO was altered after the third film in the format, South Pacific, to 24 fps running, making it unnecessary to film subsequent productions twice.

In his 1971 autobiographical book The Moon's a Balloon, actor David Niven discussed his meeting with Todd and the subsequent events that led to the film being produced. According to Niven, when Todd asked him if he would appear as Fogg, Niven enthusiastically replied, 'I'd do it for nothing!' He later admitted to being grateful that Todd did not hold him to his claim. He also described the first meeting between Todd and Robert Newton (who had drinking problems) when the latter was offered the role of the detective, Fix; Niven alleged that Newton was offered the part on condition that he did not drink any alcohol during the filming, and that his celebration following the completion of his role led to his untimely demise (he did not live to see the film released).

Filming took place in late 1955, from August 9 to December 20. The crew worked fast (75 actual days of filming), producing 680,000 feet (210,000 m) of film, which was edited down to 25,734 feet (7,844 m) of finished film. The picture cost just under $6 million to make, employing 112 locations in 13 countries and 140 sets. Todd said he and the crew visited every country portrayed in the picture, including England, France, Spain, India, East Pakistan (now Bangladesh), Thailand, Japan, and the United States. According to Time magazine's review of the film, the cast, including extras, totaled 68,894 people; it also featured 7,959 animals, "including four ostriches, six skunks, 15 elephants, 17 fighting bulls, 512 rhesus monkeys, 800 horses, 950 burros, 2,448 American bison, 3,800 Rocky Mountain sheep and a sacred cow that eats flowers on cue". There is also a cat at the Reform Club. The wardrobe department spent $410,000 to provide 74,685 costumes and 36,092 trinkets. This is allegedly the most costumes ever required for a Hollywood production.

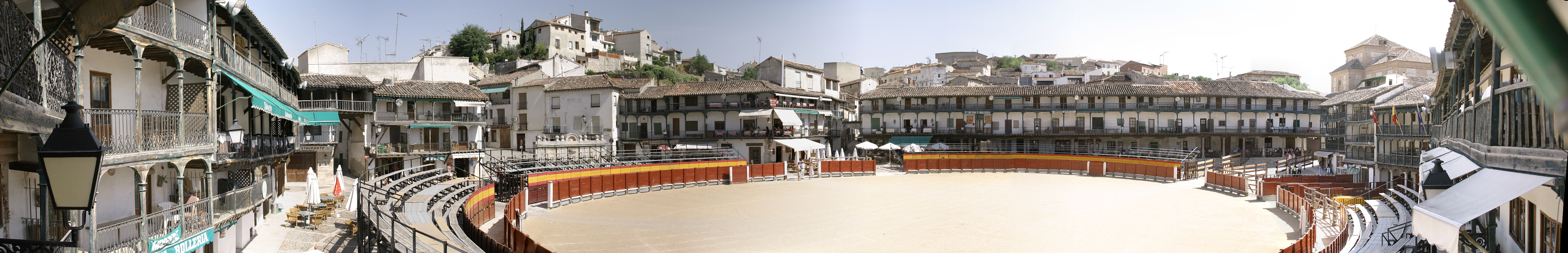
The main square of Chinchón arranged as a bullring

Some 10,000 extras were used in filming the bullfight scene in Spain, with Cantinflas as the matador; Cantinflas had previously done some bullfighting. They used all 6,500 residents of a small Spanish town called Chinchón, 45 kilometres (28 mi) from Madrid, but Todd decided there were not enough spectators, so he found 3,500 more from nearby towns. He used 650 Native Americans for a fight on a train in the West. Many were indeed Native American, but some were Hollywood extras. All 650 had their skin color altered with dye. Todd used about 50 US gallons (190 L; 42 imp gal) of orange-coloured dye for those extras.

Todd sometimes used models of boats, ships, and trains in the film, but he often decided that they did not look realistic so he switched to the real thing where he could. The scene of a collapsing train bridge is partly without models. The overhead shot of a train crossing a bridge was full scale, but the bridge collapse was a large-scale miniature, verifiable by observing the slightly jerky motion of the rear passenger car as the train pulls away, as well as the slowed-down water droplets which are out of scale in the splashing river below. All the steamships shown in the first half are miniatures shot in an outdoor studio tank. The exception is the American ship shown at the intermission point, which is real. The "American" ship is the Japanese training barque Kaiwo Maru. A tunnel was built for a train sequence out of paper mache. After the train filming was complete, the "tunnel" was pushed over into the gorge. Many of the special effects are described and pictured in a 1956 Popular Mechanics article.

The scenes of the crossing of the Atlantic Ocean by steamship took place off San Francisco and were shot on a specially built prop steamer, a converted barge mocked up to resemble a small ocean-going steamship, with mock paddles driven by the electric motor from an old streetcar. In his memoirs, Niven described the whole thing as being dangerously unstable (though stability improved as it was dismantled as though to feed it into its own furnaces as the plot required).

One of the most famous sequences in the film, the flight by hydrogen balloon, is not in the original Jules Verne novel. Because the film was made in Todd-AO, the sequence was expressly created to show off the locations seen on the flight, as projected on the giant curved screen used for the process. A similar balloon flight can be found in an earlier Jules Verne novel, Five Weeks in a Balloon, in which the protagonists explore Africa from a hydrogen balloon.

Many of the balloon scenes with Niven and Cantinflas were filmed using a 160-foot (49 m) crane. Even that height bothered Niven, who was afraid of heights. Tom Burges, who was shorter than Niven, was used as a stand-in for scenes where the balloon is seen from a distance. Many of the lots used in the film are now on the land occupied by Century City, an office complex in the Los Angeles area.

In his memoirs, Niven related that Todd completed filming while in considerable debt. The post-production work on the film was an exercise in holding off Todd's creditors long enough to produce a saleable film, and the footage was worked upon under the supervision of Todd's creditors and returned to a secure vault each night, as if it were in escrow.

The film's release and subsequent success vindicated Todd's considerable efforts.

== Release ==
The film premiered on October 17, 1956, at the Rivoli Theater in New York City and played to full houses for 15 months. It ran for 102 weeks at the theatre, with 1,564 performances, 2,173,238 patrons and a gross of $4,872,326.

It topped Variety's monthly box office chart for seven months during 1957. By the time of Todd's death in a private plane crash, 18 months after the film had opened, it had grossed $33 million.

By November 1958, the film had earned worldwide rentals of $22 million including $4.6 million from overseas from just 280 engagements. None of the overseas engagements at that date had been in Todd-AO.

In the Spanish and Latin American posters and programs for the movie, Cantinflas is billed above the other players because he was very popular in Spanish-speaking countries. There were two souvenir programmes sold in theatres. For Roadshow screenings Todd-AO is mentioned, though for general release those pages are not contained in the book. The programme was created by Todd's publicist, Art Cohn, who died in the plane crash with him. His biography, The Nine Lives of Michael Todd, was published after their deaths which put a macabre spin on the title.

== Reception ==
=== Critical response ===
Bosley Crowther called the film a "sprawling conglomeration of refined English comedy, giant-screen travel panoramics and slam-bang Keystone burlesque" and wrote that Todd and the film's crew "commandeered the giant screen and stereophonic sound as though they were Olsen and Johnson turned loose in a cosmic cutting-room, with a pipe organ in one corner and all the movies ever made to toss around".

Time magazine called it "brassy, extravagant, long-winded and funny" and the "Polyphemus of productions", writing "as a travelogue, Around the World is at least as spectacular as anything Cinerama has slapped together". Time highlighted the performance of "the famous Mexican comic, Cantinflas [who in] his first U.S. movie ... gives delightful evidence that he may well be, as Charles Chaplin once said he was, 'the world's greatest clown'."

Rotten Tomatoes retrospectively collected 43 reviews and gave the film an aggregate score of 72%, with an average rating of 6/10, with the site's consensus stating: "It's undeniably shallow, but its cheerful lack of pretense -- as well as its grand scale and star-stuffed cast -- help make Around the World in 80 Days charmingly light-hearted entertainment."

The development of the film and the personal life of actor Mario Moreno during that time were dramatized later in the 2014 film Cantinflas.

=== Accolades ===
The film was nominated for eight Academy Awards, winning five (including Best Picture), beating out critically and publicly praised films: Friendly Persuasion, Giant, The King and I and The Ten Commandments. It is also one of the few Best Picture winners not to be nominated in any acting category. It was also the last film to win Best Picture without winning Best Director until In the Heat of the Night in 1967 and the last to do so without winning Best Director or any for acting until Chariots of Fire in 1981.

Although not nominated for Best Original Song, the film's theme song "Around the World" (music by Victor Young; later lyricised by Harold Adamson), became very popular. It was a hit for Bing Crosby in 1957, and was a staple of the easy-listening genre for many years: "Around the world, I searched for you / I traveled on when hope was gone to keep a rendezvous ... No more will I go all around the world / For I have found my world in you."

The film was screened at the 1957 Cannes Film Festival, but was not entered into the main competition.

Award	Category	Nominee(s)	Result	Ref.
Academy Awards	Best Motion Picture	Mike Todd	Won	
Academy Awards	Best Director	Michael Anderson	Nominated	
Academy Awards	Best Screenplay – Adapted	James Poe, John Farrow and S.J. Perelman	Won	
Academy Awards	Best Art Direction – Color	Art Direction: James W. Sullivan and Ken Adam; Set Decoration: Ross Dowd	Nominated	
Academy Awards	Best Cinematography – Color	Lionel Lindon	Won	
Academy Awards	Best Costume Design – Color	Miles White	Nominated	
Academy Awards	Best Film Editing	Gene Ruggiero and Paul Weatherwax	Won	
Academy Awards	Best Music Score of a Dramatic or Comedy Picture	Victor Young (Note: Posthumous award.)	Won	
Directors Guild of America Awards	Outstanding Directorial Achievement in Motion Pictures	Michael Anderson	Nominated	
Golden Globe Awards	Best Motion Picture – Drama		Won	
Golden Globe Awards	Best Actor in a Motion Picture – Musical or Comedy	Cantinflas	Won	
Golden Globe Awards	Best Director – Motion Picture	Michael Anderson	Nominated	
National Board of Review Awards	Best Film		Won	
National Board of Review Awards	Top Ten Films		Won	
New York Film Critics Circle Awards	Best Film		Nominated	
New York Film Critics Circle Awards	Best Screenplay	S.J. Perelman	Nominated	
Photoplay Awards	Special Award	Mike Todd	Won	
Writers Guild of America Awards	Best Written American Comedy	James Poe, John Farrow and S.J. Perelman	Won	

=== Anniversary celebration ===
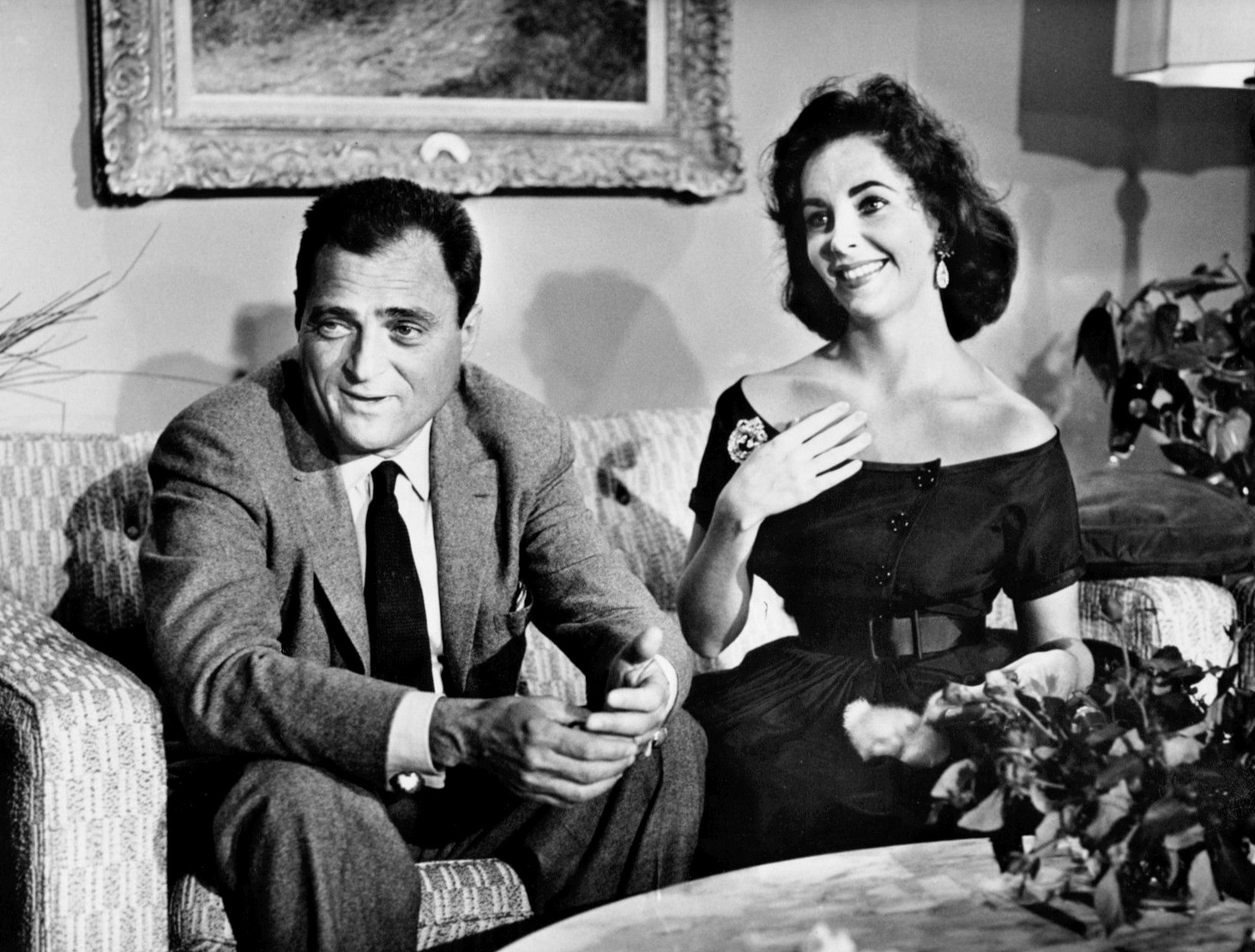
CBS paid Mike Todd for the rights to cover the anniversary celebration as a television special. Todd and his wife Elizabeth Taylor are seen here at home in a film clip which was used for the television special.

On the first anniversary of the film's release, Todd threw a party at the Madison Square Garden attended by 18,000 people; Time magazine called the party a "spectacular flop" though Todd shrugged off the remark, saying, "You can't say it was a little bust." The event, featured on a 90-minute CBS telecast, could boast of "a colossal hodgepodge of bagpipers, folk dancers, Philadelphia Mummers, Russian wolfhounds, oxen, Siamese cats, elephants, clowns, a fire engine, and a symphony orchestra."

== Distribution and ownership ==
The film was originally distributed by United Artists in two Todd-AO 70 mm versions, one for Todd-AO 70 mm release at 30 frames per second, and an alternative 70 mm version at 24 frames per second reduced to 35 mm for general release.

The original Todd-AO 70mm running time without the extra music was 179 minutes. However, after the Chicago showing Todd cut four minutes out of the Western sequence where Cantinflas is pursued by Indians. The 70mm print shown at The Rivoli theatre in NYC was 175 minutes. However, the original 35mm Technicolor/anamorphic magnetic stereo and mono optical prints ran the complete 179 minutes with the chase scene intact. Although the leaders on the optical sound prints were labelled for Perspecta directional encoding, the prints do not contain the signal and were standard mono.

In 1968, additional cuts were made including removing most of the prologue with the changing aspect ratios. Only a brief few shots with Edward R. Murrow remained and the entire "Trip to the Moon" clips were cut. Since the opening shot of Murrow was 1.33 window boxed in the wide frame, they had to crop and blow up that shot for the 2.35 ratio which made it very grainy. The intermission was also cut for the 1968 re-release which included the freeze frame of the ship and fade into the second half. The reels just jump cut with an awkward sound gap between the first and second half. The chase scene was missing from this version too which reduced the running time to 167 minutes. However, some uncut 179-minute 35mm Technicolor prints were struck too which meant at least some theatres played the Roadshow version even though the vast majority showed the shorter cut. 35mm IB/Scope copies of both versions exist from 1968. The 24 frames per second 70mm prints were also the 167-minute version in that year too. As a publicity stunt, Todd Jr. called the press when he removed a 70mm copy from a bank vault claiming it had been stored there since 1956 for safe keeping and was being shown at a theatre again. The copy they exhibited was the cut re-issue 167-minute version.

Around 1976, after its last network television broadcast on CBS, United Artists lost control of the film to Elizabeth Taylor, who was the widow of producer Michael Todd and had inherited a portion of Todd's estate. In 1983, Warner Bros. acquired the rights to the film from Taylor, and reissued the film theatrically in a re-edited 143-minute version (this version would subsequently air only once on Turner Classic Movies, this was before any restoration on the movie was announced). In the years that followed, a pan-and-scan transfer of the alternative 24 frame/s version (presented at its full 183-minute length) was shown on cable television.

In 2004, Warner Bros. issued a digitally restored version of the 24 frame/s incarnation on DVD, also at its full 183-minute length, but also including the original intermission, Entr'acte, and exit music segments that were a part of the original 1956 theatrical release, and for the first time on home video at its original 2.2:1 aspect widescreen ratio.

This restored version was reconstructed from the best available elements of the 24 frame/s edition Warner Bros. could find, and was subsequently shown on Turner Classic Movies. The original elements from the 30 frame/s/70 mm Todd-AO version (as well as the original prints derived from these elements) still exist, albeit in faded condition due to the passage of time, but remain to be formally restored by Warner Bros. There is some missing footage in the India train ride where the image artificially fades in and out to compensate for the missing shots.

Warner Bros. retained Andy Pratt Film Labs who in conjunction with Eastman Kodak developed a method to remove the cracked and faded-to-brown, clear lacquer from the original 65 mm Technicolor negative. Warners did nothing further to restore the negative. Due to costs of making a 70 mm release print even without magnetic striping, using DTS disk for audio, there are no immediate plans for any new prints. The 65 mm roadshow print negative was used for the DVD release. Had any 35 mm Anamorphic elements been used the aspect ratio would have been 2.35:1. Mike Todd had limited 35 mm anamorphic prints made with a non-standard compression ratio to provide a 2.21:1 viewing experience. These special 35 mm prints are called Cinestage, the same name of Mike Todd's showcase theatre in Chicago.

Best available prints of the 30 frame/s/70 mm version have recently been exhibited in revival movie houses worldwide. As of the present time, Warner Bros. remains the film's rights holder.

== Soundtrack and home media ==
The soundtrack was commercially released on vinyl and audio tape. Two CD versions were released as well, including a digital remastering of the original Decca album on MCA in the 1980s and an expanded version with extra tracks on the Hit Parade Records label in Canada in 2007. There was also a model kit from Adams of the balloon, a board game, and a Dell Comics adaptation. A Cantinflas puppet was released separately, dressed in an outfit similar to the Passepartout costume.

The DVDs for Around the World in 80 Days include four hours of supplemental material, in addition to the restored three-hour wide-screen presentation. Included on one of the disks is a documentary film, about 50 minutes long, about Michael Todd.

== Theme parks ==
Alton Towers theme park in England had a dark boat ride based on the film operating between 1981 and 1993.

Worlds of Fun theme park in Kansas City, Missouri was inspired by the book and film. "Worlds of Fun was designed to take visitors on a global adventure, featuring themed areas representing different parts of the world, such as Scandinavia, Africa, Europa, East Asia, and Americana." A model of the steamboat Henrietta was built and operated as the entrance to the park during its first twenty years.

== See also ==
- List of American films of 1956
