= Around the World in Eighty Days (1972 TV series) =

1972 animated series

Around the World in Eighty Days is an animated television series that lasted one season of 16 episodes, broadcast during the 1972–1973 season by NBC. It was the first Australian-produced cartoon to be shown on American network television. Leif Gram directed all 16 episodes, and the stories were loosely adapted by Chester "Chet" Stover from the 1873 novel by Jules Verne.

== Plot ==
More comedic in tone than Verne's novel, the motives of Phileas Fogg (Alastair Duncan) differ from those of his literary forerunner. In this story, Fogg is passionately in love with Belinda Maze (Janet Waldo), whose uncle, Lord Maze (Owen Weingott), sternly disapproves of the commoner Fogg marrying his niece. Fogg proposes a wager: if he can travel around the world in eighty days, then Lord Maze will give him Belinda's hand in marriage; if Fogg fails, he will abandon her. The two men also make a side bet of £20,000.

Fogg is accompanied by his valet, Jean Passepartout (Ross Higgins), and Passepartout's pet monkey, Toto. They employ all the methods of transportation available in the late 19th century—balloons, trains, elephants, and steamships—in the course of their journey. Fogg and Passepartout dispense geographical knowledge to the audience at each of their stops.

Lord Maze hires a saboteur, Mr. Fix (Max Osbiston), to interfere with Fogg and Passepartout's journey. Unlike his counterpart in Verne's novel, Fix is not a Scotland Yard detective attempting to arrest Fogg on suspicion of bank robbery.

Fogg manages to complete his journey by the end of the programme's single-season run, winning Belinda's hand with little time to spare.

== Episode structure ==
Each episode has the same structure:

- Fogg describes their destination to Passepartout.
- Fogg asks Passepartout to pack the bag with a seemingly random collection of items.
- Fogg teaches a proverb.
- Fix describes aloud about his plan to stop Fogg.
- Fogg and Passepartout follow their itinerary, while Fix tries to stop them.
- During the journey, Fogg finds the time to explain the history and geography of the locations they visit.
- Eventually, all the items Fogg and Passepartout took with them prove to be essential.
- The proverb Fogg introduced at the beginning of the episode also proves to be essential for their success.
- The episode ends with Fogg saying "Good show, Passepartout!"

=== Places and proverbs in each episode ===
Number of chapter	Place	Proverb
1	London, Buckingham Palace	The motto of the wise is, be prepared for surprises.
2	Paris	Don't jump to conclusions, or conclusions may jump on you.
3	Switzerland and the Alps	There is always a way to save the day.
4	Rome	Don't put the cart before the horse.
5	Naples, Pompei	Don't make a mountain out of a molehill.
6	Mediterranean Sea, Greek islands	Doubting your chances before you're done, may cost you the race you might have won. On the other hand: If you're over confident, you might miss the boat.
7	Greece, Athens	There is a time and a place for everything.
8	Egypt and the pyramids	Always think a problem through, before deciding what to do.
9	Sinai and Petra	The cure to most fear is knowledge.
10	Gaza, Damascus and Palmyra	The little things in life are like links in a chain: they never seem important by themselves.
11	Persia, Isfahan	To win life's game without a fall, keep your eyes open and on the ball.
12	India, Udaipur	We always help ourselves whenever we help others.
13	China sea, China	Honesty is the best policy.
14	Japan, Tokyo, Mount Fuji	Our rewards will be sweet, if we keep our world neat.
15	United States, California, San Francisco	Don't let your thoughts get in a rut; the knife which spreads may also cut.
16	United States, Louisiana, New Orleans; boat to England.	Learn to use what you have got, and you won't need what you have not.

== Production history ==
The series was produced through Australian Air Programs International, one of whose staff producers, Walter J. Hucker, served as the showrunner. NBC transmitted the sixteen episodes in the United States on its Saturday morning schedule during the 1972–1973 season.

== Music ==
John Sangster composed the theme music, set to a variation on the tune of "Mademoiselle from Armentières". The lyrics were written, specifically for the show, by an uncredited writer.

== Home video release ==
Around the World in Eighty Days was released on Region 1 DVD in the United States in a two disc set by Visual Entertainment on September 27, 2011.
