= Phileas Fogg =

Fictional character created by Jules Verne

- Around the World in Eighty Days character
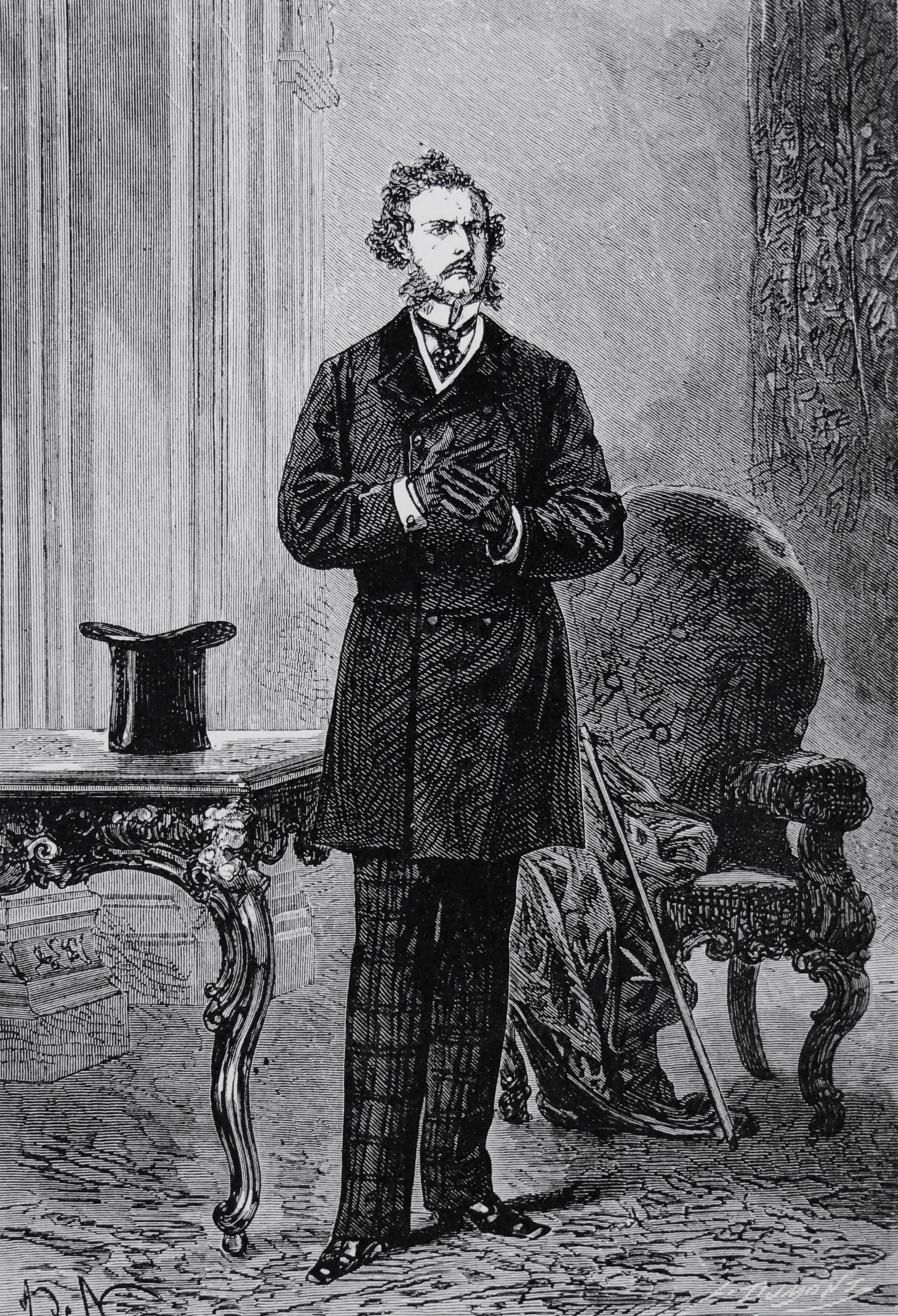
- Phileas Fogg, illustration by Alphonse de Neuville and/or Léon Benett (1873)
- Created by: Jules Verne

In-universe information
- Gender: Male
- Occupation: Gambler
- Spouse: Aouda
- Nationality: British

Phileas Fogg (/ˈfɪliəs ˈfɒɡ/ FIL-ee-əs FOG) is the protagonist in the 1872 Jules Verne novel Around the World in Eighty Days. Inspirations for the character were the American entrepreneur George Francis Train and American writer and adventurer William Perry Fogg.

== Fictional biography ==
Fogg is a man of independent means and is a gentleman who is "exact", as in he has a perfect routine and life right down to the number of steps he walks to the temperature of his shaving water. Having fired a servant for providing him with shaving water at a slightly incorrect temperature, he hires Jean Passepartout as a valet. Fogg makes a wager of £20,000 (£2.3 million in 2023) with members of London's Reform Club that he can circumnavigate the world in 80 days or fewer. He sets out with his French servant Jean Passepartout to win the wager, unaware that he is being followed by a detective named Fix, who suspects Fogg of having robbed the Bank of England. Fix spends the first half of the book trying to delay Fogg's journey to keep him in British territory while the arrest warrant is being sent out. However, after Fogg reaches America, Fix helps Fogg complete his bet to get him back to the United Kingdom, where he will be under British jurisdiction and Fix can arrest him (while still suspicious that Fogg will run off and go into hiding somewhere on the journey).

While in India, Fogg saves a widowed princess, Aouda, from sati during her husband's funeral and she accompanies Fogg for the rest of his journey after initial plans to take her to an uncle failed as the uncle had moved. Together, the trio have numerous exciting adventures which come to an abrupt end when he is arrested by Fix immediately upon their arrival back in Britain. Although Fogg is quickly exonerated of the crime, the delay caused by his false arrest appears to have cost him the wager. However, he learns from Passepartout that he has gained one calendar day during his travels, allowing him to reach the Reform Club just in time to meet his deadline and collect his winnings. He marries Aouda and divides the remainder of his travel money between Fix and Passepartout.

== Other appearances ==
In Albert Robida's Voyages très extraordinaires de Saturnin Farandoul (1879), Fogg appears in the narrative having gone on an attempt to travel the world again, this time in 77 days. He is portrayed as a serial saviour of ladies, having over three hundred rescued women accompanying him on his travels, which have lasted well over three years by the time he is introduced.

In Philip José Farmer's The Other Log of Phileas Fogg (1973), he is said to be Eridanean, an Earth-born member of the more benevolent of two extraterrestrial factions attempting to control the Earth; Fogg is a member of Farmer's Wold Newton family. Fogg's adventures continue in Phileas Fogg and the War of Shadows and Phileas Fogg and the Heart of Orsra, both by Josh Reynolds, and in "Being an Account of the Delay at Green River, Wyoming, of Phileas Fogg, World Traveler, or, The Masked Man Meets an English Gentleman" by Win Scott Eckert.

== In other media ==
=== Film ===
- Fogg was played by Conrad Veidt in the 1919 film adaptation of the book.
- A fictional grandson, Phin(l)eas Fogg III, was played by William Desmond in a 1922 12-part serial.
- Fogg was played by David Niven in the 1956 film adaptation of the book.
- In the 1963 movie The Three Stooges Go Around the World in a Daze, Moe, Larry, and Curly Joe circle the globe with Phileas Fogg III.
- Fogg was voiced by Simon Callow in the 1999 animated film adaptation of the book.
- Fogg was referenced by Allan Quatermain in the 2003 film adaptation of The League of Extraordinary Gentlemen.
- Fogg was played by Steve Coogan in the 2004 live action film adaptation by The Walt Disney Company.

=== Television ===
- In the 1957 episode of Mr. Adams and Eve "Taming of the Shrew," David Niven portrays himself as he promotes a movie version of Around the World in 80 Days in which he plays Phileas Fogg, and at one point his balloon disrupts auditions Eve Drake (Ida Lupino) and Howard Adams (Howard Duff) are holding for their movie version of The Taming of the Shrew.
- In an episode of Have Gun, Will Travel starring Richard Boone, Fogg was used in the episode "Fogg Bound" that first aired on 3 December 1960.
- In the 1969 animated series "Around the World in 79 Days," Phileas Fogg's great-grandson Phineas Fogg must beat his ancestor's record by circumnavigating the globe in 79 days in a balloon to inherit the family fortune, all the while pursued by a sinister butler named Crumden, who stands to inherit the fortune in the event that Phineas fails.
- In the 1972 animated series, Fogg was voiced by Alastair Duncan. This version of Fogg took the bet to travel the world in eighty days in order to win the hand of Lord Maze's niece, Belinda.
- On the TV show Voyagers!, Fogg is said to have been named after the main character Phineas Bogg, when the latter met Jules Verne in Montmartre.
- A 1980s cartoon series, Around the World with Willy Fog was based on, and expanded on, the original story. The characters are anthropomorphisms of various animals, with Fog as a lion and sharing the first name of Phileas' inspiration, William Perry Fogg. Furthermore, this character appears in the sequel series, Willy Fog 2, where he and his companions undertake adventures based on Verne's major science fiction novels, Journey to the Center of the Earth and Twenty Thousand Leagues under the Seas.
- Fogg was played by Pierce Brosnan in the 1989 television adaptation.
- Fogg was played by Michael Praed in The Secret Adventures of Jules Verne.
- Fogg is played by David Tennant in the 2021 series.
- The Count Duckula episode "Around the World in a Total Daze" features a spoof of the character called Sibellious Smogg.
- Alexei Sayle did a parody of Fogg in one of his comedy sketches where Fogg has to reach the front of a Post Office queue in 80 days.

=== Video games ===
- The 2014 video game 80 Days by Inkle Ltd., based on the novel by Verne, also featured an eccentric Mr. Fogg who was accompanied by his valet Passepartout.

== Homages ==
- The creators of Disney's Phineas and Ferb named Phineas Flynn after Phileas Fogg, whose first name is changed to Phineas in some adaptations.
- Podcast von der Firma.Maritim: Oscar Wilde und Mycroft Holmes – Sondermittler der Krone
- Around the World in 80 Days with Michael Palin was a BBC television travel series first broadcast in 1989. It was presented by comedian and actor Michael Palin, who followed Fogg's journey and modes of transport as closely as possible, and achieved the feat in 79 days and 7 hours.
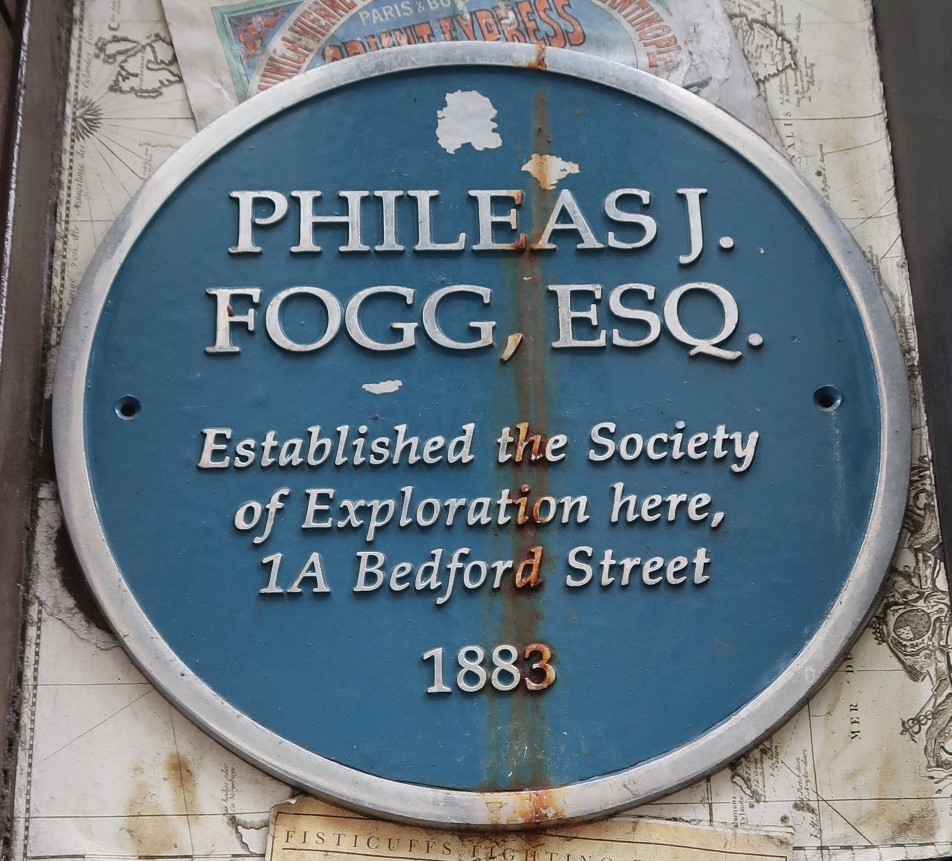
- Phileas J Fogg, Esq Established the Society of Exploration here, 1A Bedford Street (London) 1883
  Mr Fogg's is a collection of London based cocktail bars specialising in international drinks and exotic cocktails. The bars are referred to in print as places where Phileas/Phileas J. Fogg, Esq. lives or visits.
- Phileas Fogg snacks is a brand of British crisps founded in 1982. The aim was to create a snack aimed at adults and branded with a recognisable character. The range included different flavours "from around the world" such as miniature garlic breads and tortilla chips.
