= Reform Club =

Private members' club in London, England

- Founded: 1836
- Headquarters: 107 Pall Mall
- Location: London, England
- Website: reformclub.com

The Reform Club is a private members' club, owned and controlled by its members, on the south side of Pall Mall in central London, England. As with all of London's original gentlemen's clubs, it had an all-male membership for decades, but it was one of the first all-male clubs to change its rules to include the admission of women on equal terms in 1981. Since its foundation in 1836, the Reform Club has been the traditional home for those committed to progressive political ideas, with its membership initially consisting of Radicals and Whigs. However, it is no longer associated with any particular political party, and it now serves a purely social function.

The Reform Club offers reciprocal memberships with similar clubs around the world. It attracts a significant number of foreign members, such as diplomats accredited to the Court of St James's. Of the current membership of around 2,700, some 500 are "overseas members", and over 400 are women.

== History ==
=== 19th century ===
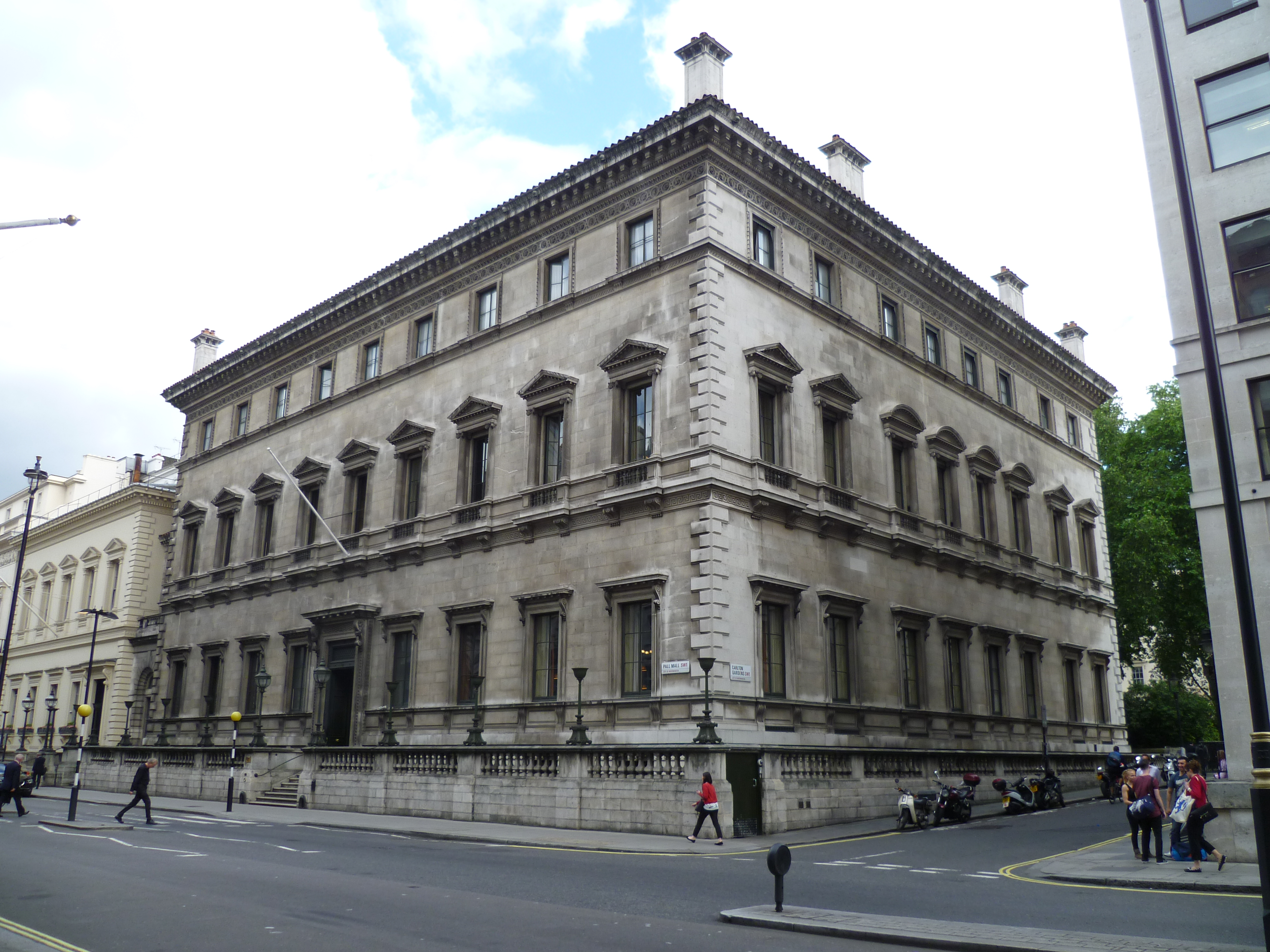
The 1841 clubhouse at 104 Pall Mall, designed by Sir Charles Barry

The club was founded by Edward Ellice, Member of Parliament (MP) for Coventry and Whig Whip, whose riches came from the Hudson's Bay Company, but whose zeal was chiefly devoted to securing the passage of the Reform Act 1832. The club held its first meeting at No. 104 Pall Mall on 5 May 1836.

This new club, for members of both Houses of Parliament, was intended to be a forum for the radical ideas which the First Reform Bill represented: its purpose was to promote "the social intercourse of the reformer of the United Kingdom".

The Reform Club's building was designed by renowned architect Sir Charles Barry and contracted to builders Grissell & Peto. The new club was built on palatial lines, the design being based on the Palazzo Farnese in Rome, and its Saloon in particular is regarded as the finest of all London's clubs. It was officially opened on 1 March 1841. Facilities provided included a library which, following extensive donations from members, grew to contain over 85,000 books.

=== 20th century ===
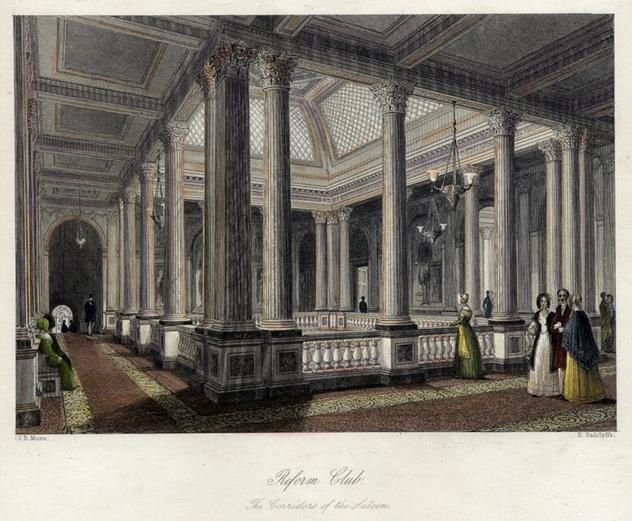
An 1840s drawing of the Gallery above the club's Saloon, on the first floor.

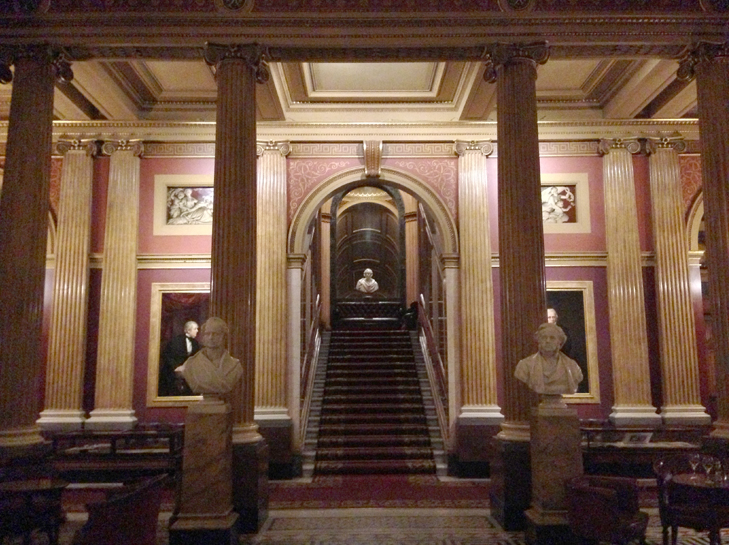
The Reform Club's italianate Saloon, with stairs leading to the Gallery

After the Second World War and with the old Liberal Party's further decline, the club increasingly drew its membership from civil servants. The club continued to attract a comprehensive list of guest speakers including Government Ministers Nick Clegg and Theresa May (2011), Archbishop John Sentamu (2012), and Ambassador Liu Xiaoming (2013).

== Literary associations ==
Besides having had many distinguished members from the literary world, including William Makepeace Thackeray and Arnold Bennett, the Reform played a role in some significant events, such as the feud between Oscar Wilde's friend and literary executor Robbie Ross and Wilde's ex-lover Lord Alfred Douglas. In 1913, after discovering that Lord Alfred had taken lodgings in the same house as himself with a view to stealing his papers, Ross sought refuge at the club, from where he wrote to Edmund Gosse, saying that he felt obliged to return to his rooms "with firearms".

Harold Owen, the brother of Wilfred Owen, called on Siegfried Sassoon at the Reform after Wilfred's death. Sassoon wrote a poem entitled "Lines Written at the Reform Club", which was printed for members at Christmas 1920.

== Appearances in popular culture and literature ==
=== Books ===
The Reform Club appears in Anthony Trollope's 1867 novel Phineas Finn. This eponymous main character becomes a member of the club and there acquaints Liberal members of the House of Commons, who arrange to get him elected to an Irish parliamentary borough. The book is one of the political novels in the Palliser series. The political events it describes are a fictionalized account of the build-up to the Second Reform Act, passed in 1867, which effectively extended the franchise to the working classes.

The club appears in Jules Verne's Around the World in Eighty Days, published in 1872, as a novel in 1873. The protagonist, Phileas Fogg, is a member of the Reform Club. He sets out to circumnavigate the world on a bet from his fellow members, beginning and ending at the club.

The Reform Club was used as a meeting place for MI6 operatives in Part 3, Chapter 1, p. 83ff of Graham Greene's spy novel The Human Factor (1978, Avon Books, ISBN 0-380-41491-0).

The Reform Club and its Victorian era celebrity chef Alexis Soyer play pivotal roles in MJ Carter's mystery novel The Devil's Feast (2016, Fig Tree, ISBN 978-0-241-14636-1).

The club features in the fourth chapter of Robert Galbraith’s seventh Cormoran Strike novel, The Running Grave.

The Filipino novel Revolution: 80 Days (2022) also featured the Reform Club as the affiliation of its protagonist, the British gentleman Richard Haze.

=== Films and television ===
Comedian and travel writer Michael Palin began and ended his televised 1989 journey around the world in 80 days at the Reform Club, following his fictional predecessor. Palin was not permitted to enter the building to complete his journey, as had been his intention, so his trip ended on the steps outside. Palin later explained that he had been refused entry not because he was not wearing a tie but because the club claimed it would 'disturb the members'.

Victorian publisher Norman Warne is depicted visiting the Reform Club in the 2006 film Miss Potter. The club has been used as a location in a number of other films, including the fencing scene in the 2002 James Bond movie Die Another Day, The Quiller Memorandum (1966), The Man Who Haunted Himself (1970), Lindsay Anderson's O Lucky Man! (1973), The Avengers (1998), Nicholas Nickleby (2002), 1408 (2007), Quantum of Solace (2008), Sherlock Holmes (2009), Paddington (2014), and Christopher Nolan's Tenet (2020).

The club was used in Chris Van Dusen's television series Bridgerton as a filming location.

=== Photoshoot ===
The Reform Club was the location of a photo shoot featuring Paula Yates for the 1979 summer issue of Penthouse.

=== Podcasts ===
In The Magnus Archives, the Reform Club was the possible location of Jurgen Leitner's library, and had secret underground tunnels.

== Notable members ==
- Anne Abel Smith
- John Hamilton-Gordon, 1st Marquess of Aberdeen and Temair
- Dr Donald Adamson
- H. H. Asquith
- Sir David Attenborough
- Sir Henry Campbell-Bannerman
- William Lygon, 7th Earl Beauchamp
- Hilaire Belloc
- Arnold Bennett
- William, Baron Beveridge
- Stewart Binns
- Rt Hon. Charles Booth
- Dame Margaret Booth
- Baroness Boothroyd
- Mihir Bose
- John Bright
- Henry, Baron Brougham and Vaux
- Michael Brown, former Conservative MP
- Guy Burgess
- Donald Cameron of Lochiel, MP
- Sir Menzies Campbell
- Samuel Carter
- Rt Hon. Joseph Chamberlain
- Andrew Carnegie
- Henri Cartier-Bresson
- Sir John Cassels
- Sir Winston Churchill, who resigned in 1913 in protest at the blackballing of a friend, Baron de Forest
- Richard Cobden
- Albert Cohen
- Professor Martin Daunton
- Sir Arthur Conan Doyle
- Queen Camilla
- Baroness Dean of Thornton-le-Fylde
- Sir Charles Dilke
- John Lambton, 1st Earl of Durham
- Edward Ellice
- Charles, Baron Falconer
- Dr Garret FitzGerald
- Edward Morgan Forster
- William Ewart Gladstone
- Sally, Baroness Greengross
- Sir William Harcourt
- Roy, Baron Hattersley
- Friedrich Hayek Nobel Laureate (Economics)
- Nick Hewer
- Barbara Hosking
- Sir Michael Howard
- Sir Bernard Ingham
- Sir Henry Irving
- Henry James
- Sir John Jardine
- Roy Jenkins
- William, Earl Jowitt
- Sir Alan Lascelles
- Ruth, Baroness Lea
- Roger Liddle
- David Lloyd George, who resigned with Churchill over Baron de Forest's blackballing
- Professor Sir Ravinder Maini
- Dame Mary Marsh
- Professor Javier Martín-Torres
- Dr José Guilherme Merquior
- James Moir
- James Montgomrey, a founding member
- Kenneth, Baron Morgan
- Sir Derek Morris
- Emma, Baroness Nicholson
- Noel, Baron Noel-Buxton
- William Compton, 5th Marquess of Northampton
- Daniel O'Connell
- Barry Edward O'Meara
- Sir David Omand
- Viscount Palmerston
- Dame Stella Rimington
- Bertram Fletcher Robinson
- Sir John Richard Robinson
- Oliver Robinson, 2nd Marquess of Ripon
- Curtis Roosevelt
- Brian Roper
- Archibald Primrose, 5th Earl of Rosebery
- Viscount Runciman
- Lord John Russell
- Siegfried Sassoon
- Paul Scofield
- Viscount Simon
- George Smith
- Sir Martin Sorrell
- Very Revd Dr Victor Stock
- Sir Edward Sullivan
- Prince Augustus Frederick, Duke of Sussex
- Professor Alan M. Taylor
- Dame Kiri Te Kanawa
- William Makepeace Thackeray
- Caroline, Lady Liddle
- William Thomson, 1st Baron Kelvin
- Jeremy Thorpe
- Sir David Walker
- Chaim Weizmann
- H. G. Wells
- Richard Grosvenor, 2nd Marquess of Westminster
- Professor Yorick Wilks
- Dame Jo Williams
- Tony Wright, former Labour MP

== See also ==
- List of London's gentlemen's clubs
- Pera House in Istanbul, said to have been inspired by the Reform Club
