= The Prince of Denmark =

The Prince of Denmark can refer to:-

- Hamlet (character), a character in Shakespeare
- The Prince of Denmark (TV series), 1974 TV series, sequel to Now Look Here
