= Diaries =

Diaries may refer to:

- the plural of diary
- Diaries: 1971-1976, a 1981 documentary by Ed Pincus
- Diaries 1969–1979: The Python Years, a 2006 book by Michael Palin
- Di4ries, a 2022 Italian teen drama television series
- OFW Diaries, a public affairs television show in the Philippines
