= No – That's Me Over Here! =

British TV sitcom (1967–1970)

- Genre: Sitcom
- Created by: Barry Cryer; Graham Chapman; Eric Idle
- Directed by: Mark Stuart; Ronald Fouracre
- Starring: Ronnie Corbett; Rosemary Leach; Henry McGee; Ivor Dean; Jill Mai Meredith
- Country of origin: United Kingdom
- Original language: English
- No. of series: 3
- No. of episodes: 25 (11 missing)

Production
- Executive producer: David Frost
- Producers: Marty Feldman; Bill Hitchcock
- Running time: 30 minutes
- Production companies: Rediffusion (series 1–2); London Weekend Television (series 3)

Original release
- Network: ITV
- Release: 14 November 1967 – 5 December 1970

No – That's Me Over Here! is a British sitcom that aired for three series from 14 November 1967 to 5 December 1970.

It was created by Barry Cryer, Graham Chapman and Eric Idle, and it featured Ronnie Corbett's first acting starring role, alongside Rosemary Leach, Henry McGee (who was at the time also playing the straight man in The Benny Hill Show), Ivor Dean and Jill Mai Meredith.

It was originally produced by Rediffusion for the ITV network, with its production being continued by London Weekend Television for the third and final series.

== Plot ==
Ronnie Corbett played Ronnie, a man short in stature but big in ideas, and a quintessential suburban commuter who works in an insurance company with his snooty neighbour Cyril (played by McGee). Ronnie and Cyril not only work in the same department, but they also go to work every morning in the same train in the same compartment, which means that their business lives are rather linked to each other. Ronnie is aspiring and ambitious, always coming up with plans to improve his profile at work and win favour with his (and Cyril's) boss Mr. Robinson (played by Dean), and not stopping at anything to make sure his plans progress. The comedy hence arises from Ronnie's big plans and how they meet with Cyril's and others' secret opposition, and their constant attempts to back-stab Ronnie – Cyril being a quintessential practitioner of 'office politics'. The other main character in the series is Mr. Robinson's secretary (played by Meredith).

== Episodes ==
=== Series 1 (1967) ===
- 1.1. Series 1, Episode 1 (14 November 1967)
- 1.2. Series 1, Episode 2 (21 November 1967)
- 1.3. Series 1, Episode 3 (28 November 1967)
- 1.4. Series 1, Episode 4 (5 December 1967)
- 1.5. Series 1, Episode 5 (12 December 1967)
- 1.6. Series 1, Episode 6 (19 December 1967)

=== Series 2 (1968) ===
- 2.1. Series 2, Episode 1 (15 May 1968)
- 2.2. Series 2, Episode 2 (22 May 1968)
- 2.3. Series 2, Episode 3 (29 May 1968)
- 2.4. Series 2, Episode 4 (5 June 1968)
- 2.5. Series 2, Episode 5 (12 June 1968)
- 2.6. Series 2, Episode 6 (19 June 1968)

=== Series 3 (1970) ===
- 3.1. "Old Age" (12 September 1970)
- 3.2. "Registration" (19 September 1970)
- 3.3. "Mother" (26 September 1970)
- 3.4. "Social" (3 October 1970)
- 3.5. "Drink" (10 October 1970)
- 3.6. "Neighbours" (17 October 1970)
- 3.7. "The Girl" (24 October 1970)
- 3.8. "Fancy Dress" (31 October 1970)
- 3.9. "Brothers In Law" (7 November 1970)
- 3.10. "Money" (14 November 1970)
- 3.11. "Religion" (21 November 1970)
- 3.12. "Politics" (28 November 1970)
- 3.13. "Wedding" (5 December 1970)

== Production details ==
Cryer, Chapman and Idle worked as a team for the first series, all three writing each of the six episodes. Idle then dropped out. Seasons two and three were written by Cryer and Chapman, working as a duo.

The first two series were produced by Rediffusion. During his tenure as presenter and producer at Rediffusion, David Frost brought the writing team and cast together, all of them having been involved with him shortly before in The Frost Report. He used the same process in The Ronnie Barker Playhouse, which was the first sitcom anthology series to star the other Ronnie, Ronnie Barker.

When Frost moved from Rediffusion to LWT in 1968, the future Pythons and two Ronnies followed him and continued to work for him there, as well as becoming involved in other LWT productions. Hence, in 1970, Frost had LWT revive No – That's Me Over Here! for another series, over which he once again presided, this time in colour (it had been produced in black and white in its Rediffusion incarnation).

== Archive status and availability ==
The entirety of the first two series (made by Rediffusion) are missing from the archives, although one 1967 episode appears to exist in private hands. However, the final series (made by LWT in colour) exists in its entirety. All 13 episodes of the third series were released by Network in the UK (Region 2 DVD) on 13 July 2015.
