= Michael Palin in Nigeria =

2024 British television travel documentary series

- Written by: Michael Palin
- Presented by: Michael Palin
- Theme music composer: Miguel d'Oliveira
- Country of origin: United Kingdom
- Original language: English
- No. of series: 1
- No. of episodes: 3

Production
- Production location: Nigeria
- Production company: ITN Productions

Original release
- Network: Channel 5
- Release: 16 April – 30 April 2024

Related
- Michael Palin: Into Iraq

Michael Palin in Nigeria is a television travel documentary presented by Michael Palin and first aired in the UK in three parts on Channel 5 on 16, 23 and 30 April 2024. In the series, Palin takes a 1,300-mile (2,100 km) journey across Nigeria.
