= Michael Palin =

English actor (born 1943)

Sir Michael Palin KCMG CBE FRGS FRSGS FRSL
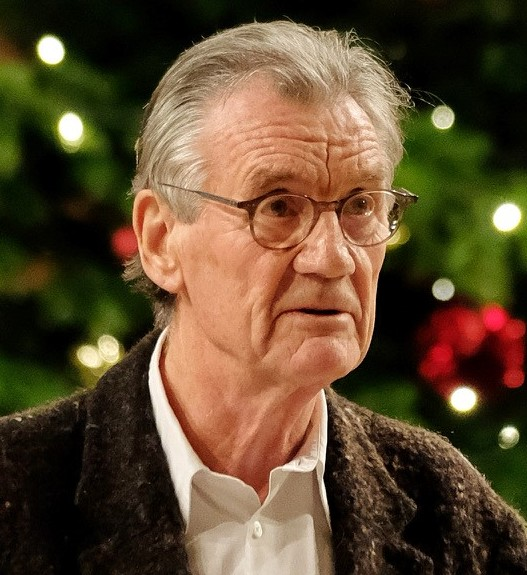
- Palin in 2018
- Born: Michael Edward Palin; 5 May 1943 (age 83); Sheffield, South Yorkshire, England
- Education: University of Oxford (BA)
- Occupations: Actor; comedian; writer; television presenter
- Years active: 1965–present
- Known for: Monty Python; Travel documentary
- Spouse: Helen Gibbins (m. 1966; died 2023)
- Children: 3
- Website: themichaelpalin.com

Sir Michael Edward Palin (/ˈpeɪlɪn/ PAY-lin; born 5 May 1943) is an English actor, writer and television presenter. He was a member of the Monty Python comedy group. He received the BAFTA Fellowship in 2013 and was knighted by Queen Elizabeth II in 2019.

Palin started in television working on programmes including the Ken Dodd Show, The Frost Report and Do Not Adjust Your Set. He joined Monty Python's Flying Circus (1969–1974) alongside John Cleese, Eric Idle, Terry Gilliam, Terry Jones and Graham Chapman. He acted in some of the most famous Python sketches, including "Argument Clinic", "Dead Parrot sketch", "The Lumberjack Song", "The Spanish Inquisition", "Bicycle Repair Man" and "The Fish-Slapping Dance". Palin continued to work with Jones away from Python, co-writing Ripping Yarns.

Palin co-wrote and starred in Monty Python and the Holy Grail (1975), Life of Brian (1979) and The Meaning of Life (1983). For his performance in A Fish Called Wanda (1988) he received the BAFTA Award for Best Actor in a Supporting Role. Other notable films include Jabberwocky (1977), Time Bandits (1981), The Missionary (1982), A Private Function (1984), Brazil (1985), Fierce Creatures (1997) and The Death of Stalin (2017).

Since 1980, Palin has made numerous television travel documentaries and is a widely recognised writer and presenter. He has been a travel writer and travel documentarian in programmes broadcast on the BBC. His journeys have taken him across the world, including the North and South Poles, the Sahara, the Himalayas, Eastern Europe and Brazil; in 2018, he visited North Korea, documenting his visit to the isolated country in a series broadcast on Channel 5. Palin visited Nigeria in 2023 to make a travel documentary that was aired in 2024. From 2009 to 2012 he was president of the Royal Geographical Society.

== Early life and education ==
Palin was born in 1943, in Ranmoor, Sheffield, the second child and only son of Edward Moreton Palin and Mary Rachel Lockhart. His father was a Shrewsbury and Cambridge-educated engineer working for a steel firm. His maternal grandfather, Lieutenant-Colonel Richard Lockhart Ovey, DSO, was High Sheriff of Oxfordshire in 1927.

Palin was educated at Birkdale School in Sheffield and later (like his father) at Shrewsbury School. His sister Angela was nine years his senior; despite the age gap, the two had a close relationship until her suicide in 1987. The Palin family has ancestral roots in Letterkenny, County Donegal. His great-grandmother fled to America from the Irish Famine and was adopted by a wealthy American family.

When he was five years old, Palin had his first acting experience at Birkdale, playing Martha Cratchit in a school performance of A Christmas Carol. At the age of 10, still interested in acting, he made a comedy monologue and read a Shakespeare play to his mother while playing all the parts.

After leaving Shrewsbury School in 1962, Palin went on to read modern history at Brasenose College, Oxford. With fellow student Robert Hewison he performed and wrote, for the first time, comedy material at a university Christmas party. Terry Jones, also a student at Oxford, saw that performance and began writing with Hewison and Palin. That year Palin joined the Brightside and Carbrook Co-operative Society Players and first gained fame when he won an acting award at a Co-op drama festival. He also performed and wrote in the Oxford Revue (called the Et ceteras) with Jones.

== Career ==
=== Early career ===
After finishing university in 1965, Palin became a presenter on a comedy pop show called Now! for the television contractor Television Wales and the West. At the same time, Palin was contacted by Jones, who had left university a year earlier, to help with writing a theatrical documentary about sex through the ages. Although this project was eventually abandoned, it brought Palin and Jones together as a writing duo and led them to write comedy for various BBC programmes, such as The Ken Dodd Show, The Billy Cotton Bandshow, and The Illustrated Weekly Hudd. They collaborated in writing lyrics for an album by Barry Booth called Diversions. They were also in the team of writers working for The Frost Report, whose other members included Frank Muir, Barry Cryer, Marty Feldman, Ronnie Barker, Ronnie Corbett, Dick Vosburgh and future Monty Python members Graham Chapman, John Cleese and Eric Idle.

Although the members of Monty Python had already encountered each other over the years, The Frost Report was the first time all the British members of Monty Python (its sixth member, Terry Gilliam, was at that time an American citizen) worked together. During the run of The Frost Report the Palin/Jones team contributed material to two shows starring John Bird: The Late Show and A Series of Birds. For A Series of Birds the Palin/Jones team had their first experience of writing narrative instead of the short sketches they were accustomed to conceiving.

Following The Frost Report the Palin/Jones team worked both as actors and writers on the show Twice a Fortnight with Graeme Garden, Bill Oddie and Jonathan Lynn, and the successful children's comedy show Do Not Adjust Your Set with Idle and David Jason. The show also featured musical numbers by the Bonzo Dog Doo-Dah Band, including future Monty Python musical collaborator Neil Innes. The animations for Do Not Adjust Your Set were made by Terry Gilliam. Eager to work with Palin sans Jones, Cleese later asked him to perform in How to Irritate People together with Chapman and Tim Brooke-Taylor. The Palin/Jones team were reunited for The Complete and Utter History of Britain.

=== Monty Python ===
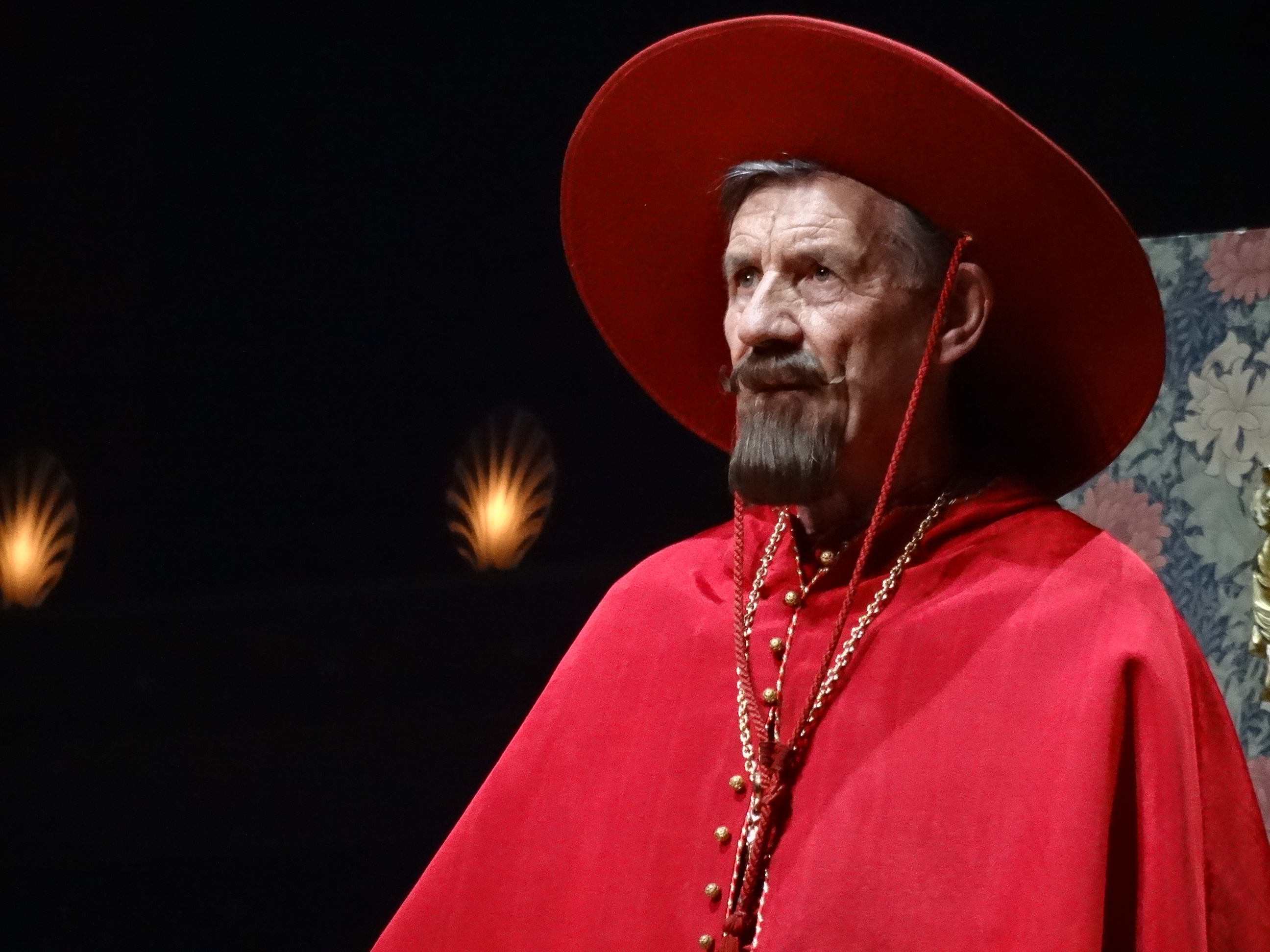
Palin in "The Spanish Inquisition" sketch at the 2014 reunion, Monty Python Live (Mostly)

On the strength of their work on The Frost Report and other programmes, Cleese and Chapman had been offered a show by the BBC, but Cleese was reluctant to do a two-man show for various reasons, among them Chapman's reputedly difficult personality. During this period Cleese contacted Palin about doing the show that ultimately became Monty Python's Flying Circus. At the same time the success of Do Not Adjust Your Set had led Palin, Jones, Idle and Gilliam to be offered their own series and, while it was still in production, Palin agreed to Cleese's proposal and brought along Idle, Jones and Gilliam. Thus the formation of the Monty Python troupe has been referred to as a result of Cleese's desire to work with Palin and the chance circumstances that brought the other four members into the fold.

Palin played various roles in Monty Python, which ranged from manic enthusiasm (such as the lumberjack of "The Lumberjack Song", or Herbert Anchovy, host of the game show "Blackmail") to unflappable calmness (such as the dead parrot seller or cheese shop proprietor). As a straight man he was often a foil to the rising ire of characters portrayed by Cleese. He also played timid, socially inept characters such as Arthur Putey, the man who sits quietly as a marriage counsellor (Eric Idle) has sex with his wife (Carol Cleveland), and Mr Anchovy, a chartered accountant who wants to become a lion tamer. He appeared as the "It's" man (a Robinson Crusoe-type castaway with torn clothes and a long, unkempt beard) at the beginning of most episodes. He also frequently played a Gumby, a character Palin said "had these moronic views that were expressed with extraordinary force".

Palin frequently co-wrote sketches with Terry Jones, including the "Spanish Inquisition sketch", which featured the catchphrase "Nobody expects the Spanish Inquisition!". He also composed songs with Jones including "The Lumberjack Song", "Every Sperm Is Sacred" and "Spam". His solo musical compositions included "Decomposing Composers" and "Finland".

=== 1974–1996: Ripping Yarns and film roles ===
In 1971, he co-wrote, with Hugh Leonard and Terence Feely, the film Percy, which depicts a penis transplant.

After the Monty Python television series ended in 1974, the Palin/Jones team worked on Ripping Yarns, an intermittent television comedy series broadcast over three years from 1976. They had earlier collaborated on the play Secrets from the BBC series Black and Blue in 1973. He played the lead role of the peasant Dennis in Terry Gilliam's 1977 film Jabberwocky. (He had earlier played the cameo role of "Dennis the Peasant" in Monty Python and the Holy Grail, also directed by Gilliam.) Palin also appeared in All You Need Is Cash (1978) as Eric Manchester (based on Derek Taylor), the press agent for the Rutles. In 1980, Palin co-wrote Time Bandits with Terry Gilliam. He also acted in the film.

In 1982, Palin wrote and starred in The Missionary, co-starring Maggie Smith. In it, he plays the Reverend Charles Fortescue, who is recalled from Africa to aid prostitutes. He co-starred with Maggie Smith again in the 1984 comedy film A Private Function. In 1984, he reunited with Terry Gilliam to appear in Brazil. He appeared in the comedy film A Fish Called Wanda, which co-starred and was co-written by John Cleese, for which he won the BAFTA Award for Best Actor in a Supporting Role. Cleese reunited the main cast almost a decade later to make Fierce Creatures. After filming for Fierce Creatures finished, Palin went on a travel journey for a BBC documentary and, returning a year later, found that the end of Fierce Creatures had failed at test screenings and had to be reshot.

=== 1996–present ===
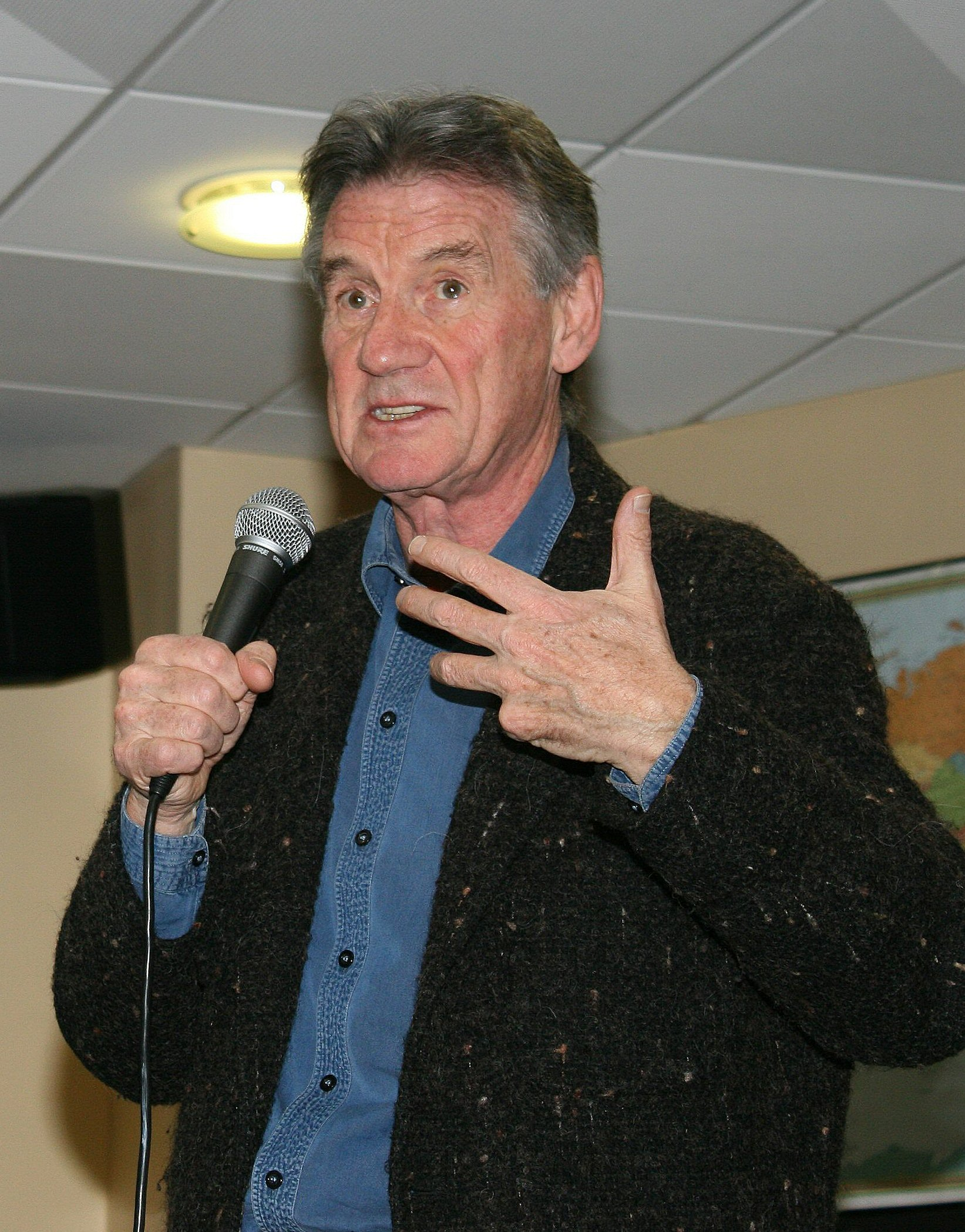
Palin at Nightingale House, in Clapham, November 2010

After Fierce Creatures and a small part in The Wind in the Willows, a film directed by and starring Terry Jones, it was twenty years until Palin's next film role, as Soviet politician Vyacheslav Molotov in the 2017 satirical black comedy The Death of Stalin. Palin also appeared with John Cleese in his documentary The Human Face. Palin was cast in a supporting role in the Tom Hanks and Meg Ryan romantic comedy You've Got Mail, but his role was eventually cut entirely.

Palin has also appeared in serious drama. In 1991 he appeared in the film American Friends, which he wrote based upon a real event in the life of his great-grandfather, a fellow at St John's College, Oxford. In that same year he also played the part of a headmaster in Alan Bleasdale's Channel 4 drama series GBH. In 1994, Palin narrated the English language audiobook version of Esio Trot by children's author Roald Dahl.

In 1997, Palin had a small cameo role in the Australian soap opera Home and Away. He played an English surfer with a fear of sharks, who interrupts a conversation between two main characters to ask whether there were any sharks in the sea. This was filmed while he was in Australia for the Full Circle series, with a segment about the filming of the role featuring in the series. In November 2005, he appeared in the John Peel's Record Box documentary.

In 2013, Palin appeared in a First World War drama titled The Wipers Times written by Ian Hislop and Nick Newman. At the Cannes Film Festival in 2016, it was announced that Palin was set to star alongside Adam Driver in Terry Gilliam's The Man Who Killed Don Quixote. Palin, however, dropped out of the film after it ran into a financial problem.

While speaking at the Edinburgh International Film Festival, Palin announced that he was presenting the two-part documentary Michael Palin in North Korea to be broadcast on the British television network Channel 5. The documentary was broadcast in September 2018, in two one-hour segments on Channel 5 in the UK and in a single two-hour programme on National Geographic in the United States. It was broadcast again by Channel 5, in a single two-hour programme in December 2018.

In July 2019, Palin performed a one-man stage show at the Torch Theatre, Milford Haven, Wales, about the loss of HMS Erebus during the third Franklin expedition, which is recounted in his book Erebus: The Story of a Ship.

== Television documentaries ==
=== Travel ===
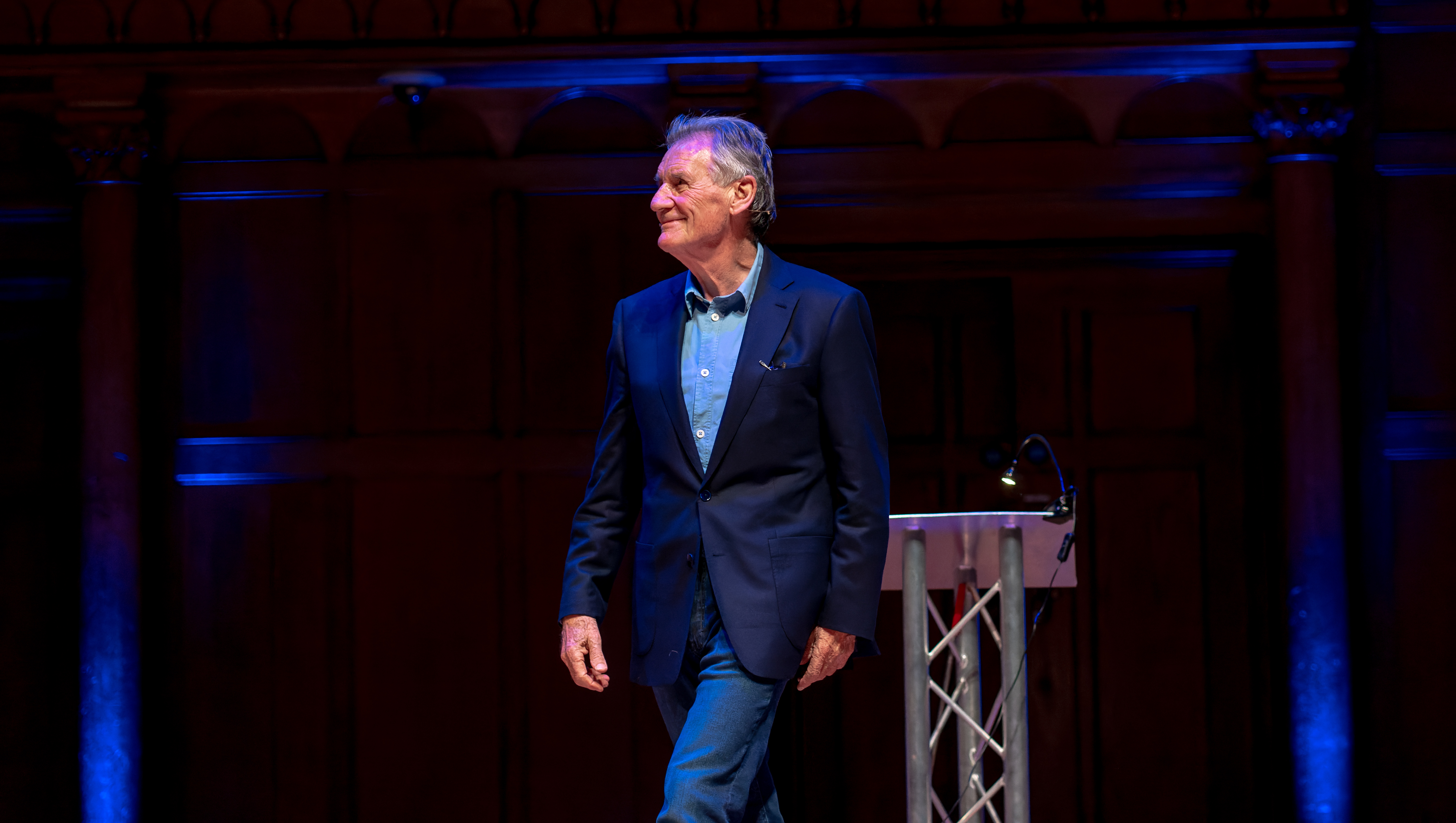
Palin at Cadogan Hall in 2022

Palin's first travel documentary was episode 4 of the 1980 BBC Television series Great Railway Journeys of the World, titled "Confessions of a Trainspotter". Throughout the hour-long show, Palin humorously reminisces about his childhood hobby of train spotting while he travels throughout the UK by train from London to Kyle of Lochalsh, via Manchester, York, Newcastle upon Tyne, Edinburgh and Inverness. He rides vintage railway lines and trains including the Flying Scotsman. At Kyle of Lochalsh, Palin bought the station's long metal platform sign and is seen lugging it back to London with him.

In 1994, Palin travelled through Ireland for another episode of the same series, titled "Derry to Kerry". In a quest for family roots, he attempted to trace his great-grandmother – Brita Gallagher – who had set sail from Ireland 150 years earlier during the Great Famine (1845–1849), bound for a new life in Burlington, New Jersey.

Between 1989 and 2012, Palin appeared as a presenter in a series of travel programmes made for the BBC. It was after the veteran TV globetrotter Alan Whicker and journalist Miles Kington turned down presenting the first of these, Around the World in 80 Days with Michael Palin, that gave Palin the opportunity to present his first and subsequent travel shows. In 2018, he was hired by ITN Productions to present travel documentaries commissioned by Channel 5, with journeys to North Korea and Iraq completed by 2022.

- Around the World in 80 Days with Michael Palin (travel 1988; programme release 1989): travelling as closely as possible the path described in the Jules Verne story without using aircraft.
- Pole to Pole with Michael Palin (travel 1991; programme release 1992): travelling from the North Pole to the South Pole, following as closely as possible the 30-degree east line of longitude, over as much land as possible, i.e., through Europe and Africa.
- Full Circle with Michael Palin (travel 1995/96; programme release 1997): in which he circumnavigated the lands around the Pacific Ocean anti-clockwise; a journey of almost 50,000 miles (80,000 km) starting on Little Diomede Island in the Bering Strait and taking him through Asia, Oceania and the Americas.
- Michael Palin's Hemingway Adventure (1999): retracing the footsteps of Ernest Hemingway through the United States, Europe, Africa and the Caribbean.
- Sahara with Michael Palin (travel 2001/02; programme release 2002): in which he trekked around and through the world's largest desert.
- Himalaya with Michael Palin (travel 2003/04; programme release 2004): in which he travels through the Himalaya region.
- Michael Palin's New Europe (travel 2006/07; programme release 2007): in which he travels through Central and Eastern Europe.
- Brazil with Michael Palin (2012) in which he travels through Brazil.
- Michael Palin in North Korea on Channel 5 (2018, this ITN production was released in the US as North Korea from the Inside with Michael Palin) in which he visits North Korea at the time of the April 2018 inter-Korean summit.
- Michael Palin: Into Iraq on Channel 5 (2022).
- Michael Palin in Nigeria on Channel 5 (2024).
- Michael Palin in Venezuela on Channel 5 (2025).
- Michael Palin in the Philippines on Channel 5 (2026).

Following each trip, Palin wrote a book about his travels, providing information and insights not included in the TV programme. Each book is illustrated with photographs by Basil Pao, the stills photographer who was on the team. (Exception: the first book, Around the World in 80 Days, contains some pictures by Pao but most are by other photographers.) All of these books were also made available as audiobooks, and all of them are read by Palin himself. Around the World in 80 Days and Hemingway Adventure are unabridged, while the other four books were made in both abridged and unabridged versions.

For four of the trips, a photography book was made by Pao, each with an introduction written by Palin. These are large coffee-table-style books with pictures printed on glossy paper. The majority of the pictures are of various people encountered on the trip, as informal portraits or showing them engaged in some interesting activity. Some of the landscape photos are displayed as two-page spreads.

Palin's travel programmes are responsible for a phenomenon called the "Palin effect", referring to areas of the world that he has visited suddenly become popular tourist attractions – for example, the significant increase in the number of tourists interested in Peru after Palin visited Machu Picchu. In a 2006 survey of "15 of the world's top travel writers" by The Observer, Palin named Peru's Pongo de Mainique (canyon below the Machu Picchu) his "favourite place in the world".

Palin notes in his book of Around the World in 80 Days that the final leg of his journey could originally have taken him and his crew on one of the trains involved in the Clapham Junction rail crash, but they arrived ahead of schedule and caught an earlier train.

=== Art and history ===
Palin has also written and presented occasional documentary programmes about artists who interest him. The first, on Scottish painter Anne Redpath, was Palin on Redpath in 1997. In The Bright Side of Life (2000), Palin continued on a Scottish theme, looking at the work of the Scottish Colourists. Two further programmes followed on European painters; Michael Palin and the Ladies Who Loved Matisse (2004) and Michael Palin and the Mystery of Hammershøi (2005), about the French artist Henri Matisse and Danish artist Vilhelm Hammershøi respectively. The DVD Michael Palin on Art contains all these documentaries except for the Matisse programme. In 2013, he travelled to the United States and filmed in both Maine and Pennsylvania, to write and present "Michael Palin in Wyeth World", which is about the American painter Andrew Wyeth and the people who inspired his paintings.

In November 2008, Palin presented a First World War documentary about Armistice Day, 11 November 1918, when thousands of soldiers lost their lives in battle after the war had officially ended. Palin filmed on the battlefields of Northern France and Belgium for the programme, called the Last Day of World War One, produced for the BBC's Timewatch series.

The BBC announced on 2nd September 2026 that Palin would narrate a documentary about the Bayeux Tapestry on its return to Britain for the first time in 950 years.The programme will be available on BBC iplayer from 10th September, 2026.

== Personal life ==
In 1966, Palin married Helen Gibbins (born October 1942), whom he first met in 1959 on holiday in Southwold in Suffolk. This meeting was later fictionalised in Palin's teleplay for the 1987 BBC television drama East of Ipswich. Their marriage lasted for 57 years, until Helen's death from kidney failure on 2 May 2023.

Palin has three adult children: Thomas (born 1969), William (born 1970), and Rachel (born 1975); he also has four grandchildren. Rachel is a BBC TV director, whose work includes MasterChef: The Professionals. William is Director of Conservation at the Old Royal Naval College, Greenwich, London, and oversaw the 2018–19 restoration of the Painted Hall. A photograph of William as a baby briefly appeared in Monty Python and the Holy Grail as "Sir Not-appearing-in-this-film". Theatre designer Jeremy Herbert is a nephew.

Palin describes his religious belief as "agnostic with doubts". He has lived in Gospel Oak, London, since the 1960s.

Palin is a supporter of both Sheffield United and Sheffield Wednesday, holding aloft a trophy whilst shouting the club's name while in Venice shooting Around the World in 80 Days. He has also followed the fortunes of Stenhousemuir F.C.

On turning 80, Palin said

Eighty is a weird land to be in. People say to you "you're a very young 70". No one ever says "you're a very young 80".

In October 2026, Palin fractured three ribs and his pelvis in a fall in his bathroom. He cancelled his promotional tour for the book of Michael Palin in the Philippines and any other planned events.

== Activism and charity ==
Palin assisted Campaign for Better Transport and others with campaigns on sustainable transport, particularly those relating to urban areas, and has been president of the campaign since 1986.

Palin has been a long-time supporter of the urban tree charity, Trees for Cities, and helped plant their one millionth tree outside St Thomas' Hospital in London. He also launched the charity's 'Edible Playground' at Carlton Primary School in 2015 after helping to raise funds for the project, which greens inner city school playgrounds and provides children with food growing opportunities.

On 2 January 2011, he became the first person to sign the UK-based Campaign for Better Transport's Fair Fares Now campaign. In July 2015, he signed an open letter and gave an interview to support "a strong BBC at the centre of British life" at a time when the government was reviewing the corporation's size and activities.

In July 2010, Palin sent a message of support for the Dongria Kondh tribe of India, who were resisting mining on their land by the company Vedanta Resources. Palin said, "I've been to the Nyamgiri Hills in Orissa and seen the forces of money and power that Vedanta Resources have arrayed against a people who have occupied their land for thousands of years, who husband the forest sustainably and make no great demands on the state or the government. The tribe I visited simply want to carry on living in the villages that they and their ancestors have always lived in."

Palin is a longstanding Vice President of the National Churches Trust.

Palin is a co-founder of The Michael Palin Centre for Stammering. When it opened in 1993 Palin became Vice President of Action for Stammering Children. Palin's awareness and understanding of stammering stemmed from his father’s experience as a person who stammers. Over the years Palin has provided support and connection to young people and families of people who stammer.

== Filmography ==
=== Film ===
Year	Title	Role	Notes
1971	And Now for Something Completely Different	Various roles	Also writer
1975	Monty Python and the Holy Grail	Sir Galahad the Pure; Leader of the Knights Who Say "Ni!"; Various roles	Also writer
1977	Jabberwocky	Dennis Cooper	
1978	All You Need Is Cash	Eric Manchester/Lawyer	
1979	Monty Python's Life of Brian	Pontius Pilate/Various roles	Also writer
1981	Time Bandits	Vincent	Also writer
1982	Monty Python Live at the Hollywood Bowl	Various roles	Also writer
1982	The Missionary	The Reverend Charles Fortescue	Also writer and producer
1983	Monty Python's The Meaning of Life	Various roles	Also writer
1983	The Crimson Permanent Assurance	Workman	Short film
1984	A Private Function	Gilbert Chilvers	
1985	Brazil	Jack Lint	
1987	The Grand Knockout Tournament	Himself	Television special
1988	A Fish Called Wanda	Ken Pile	
1991	American Friends	Reverend Francis Ashby	Also writer
1995	The Wind in the Willows	The Sun	
1997	Fierce Creatures	Adrian 'Bugsy' Malone	
2010	Not the Messiah	Mrs Betty Palin/Pontius Pilate/Bevis	
2011	Arthur Christmas	Ernie Clicker	Voice only
2012	A Liar's Autobiography: The Untrue Story of Monty Python's Graham Chapman	Various roles	Voice only
2014	Monty Python Live	Various roles	Also writer
2015	Absolutely Anything	Kindly Alien	Voice only
2017	The Death of Stalin	Vyacheslav Molotov	
2026	The Magic Faraway Tree	Know-All	

=== Television ===
Year	Title	Role	Notes
1965–1966	Now!	Himself (host)	
1966–1967	The Frost Report		Writer
1966–1967	The Late Show		Writer
1967	A Series of Bird's		Also writer
1967	Twice a Fortnight	Various	Also writer
1967–1969	Do Not Adjust Your Set	Various	Also writer
1968	Broaden Your Mind	Various	Also writer
1968	How to Irritate People	Various	
1968	Marty	Various	Also writer
1969	The Complete and Utter History of Britain	Various	Also writer
1969–1974	Monty Python's Flying Circus	Various	Also writer
1975	Three Men in a Boat	Harris	TV movie
1976–1979	Ripping Yarns	Various	Also writer
1978–1984	Saturday Night Live	Himself (host)	4 episodes
1980	Great Railway Journeys of the World	Himself	Episode: "Confessions of a Trainspotter"; also writer
1987	East of Ipswich		Writer
1989	Around the World in 80 Days with Michael Palin	Himself (host)	Also writer
1989	Number 27		TV movie, writer
1991	G.B.H.	Jim Nelson	
1992	Pole to Pole with Michael Palin	Himself (host)	Also writer
1993	Tracey Ullman: A Class Act	Various	TV movie
1994	Great Railway Journeys	Himself (host)	Episode: "Derry to Kerry"; also writer
1994	Palin's Column	Himself (host)	
1995	The Wind in the Willows	Rat (voice)	TV movie
1996	The Willows in Winter	Rat (voice)	TV movie
1997	Full Circle with Michael Palin	Himself (host)	Also writer
1997	Palin on Redpath	Himself (host)	
1998	Monty Python Live at Aspen	Himself / various	
1999	Michael Palin's Hemingway Adventure	Himself (host)	Also writer
2000	Michael Palin On... The Colourists	Himself (host)	Also writer
2002	Sahara with Michael Palin	Himself (host)	Also writer
2002	Life on Air	Himself (host)	
2004	Himalaya with Michael Palin	Himself (host)	Also writer
2004	Michael Palin and the Ladies Who Loved Matisse	Himself (host)	
2005	Michael Palin and the Mystery of Hammershøi	Himself (host)	
2007	Michael Palin's New Europe	Himself (host)	Also writer
2007	Robbie the Reindeer	Gariiiiiii/Gary (voice)	Episode: "Close Encounters of the Herd Kind"
2008	The Last Day of World War One	Himself (host)	Also writer
2008	Around the World in 20 Years	Himself (host)	Also writer
2012	Brazil with Michael Palin	Himself (host)	Also writer
2013	The Wipers Times	General Mitford	TV movie
2013	Michael Palin in Wyeth's World	Himself (host)	Also writer
2014	Remember Me	Tom Parfitt	
2015	Michael Palin's Quest for Artemisia	Himself (host)	
2015–2020	Clangers	Narrator	
2016	Michael Palin meets Jan Morris		
2018	Vanity Fair	William Makepeace Thackeray	
2018	Michael Palin in North Korea	Himself (host)	
2019	Worzel Gummidge	The Green Man	
2020	The Simpsons	Museum Curator (voice)	Episode: "I, Carumbus"
2020	Michael Palin: Travels of a Lifetime	Himself (host)	
2020	Michael Palin’s Himalaya: Journey of a Lifetime	Himself (host)	
2021	Staged	Himself	
2022	Michael Palin: Into Iraq	Himself (host)	
2024	Michael Palin in Nigeria	Himself (host)	
2025	The Secret Life of Trees	Narrator	Three-part series
2025	Michael Palin in Venezuela	Himself (host)	
2026	Small Prophets	Brian	
2026	Michael Palin in the Philippines	Himself (host)	Travelogue series

Key
†	Denotes television productions that have not yet been released

=== Radio ===
- The Weekend (2017, adapted from his 1994 stage play)
- John Finnemore's Double Acts – "The Wroxton Box" (Series 2, Episode 6; 2017)
- Torchwood: Tropical Beach Sounds and Other Relaxing Seascapes #4 (April 2020)

== Bibliography ==
=== Travel books ===
- Around the World in 80 Days (1989) ISBN 0-563-20826-0
- Pole to Pole (1992) ISBN 0-563-37065-3
- Full Circle (1997) ISBN 0-563-37121-8
- Michael Palin's Hemingway Adventure (1999) ISBN 0-297-82528-3
- Sahara (2002) ISBN 0-297-84303-6
- Himalaya (2004) ISBN 0-297-84371-0
- New Europe (2007) ISBN 0-297-84449-0
- Brazil (2012) ISBN 0-297-86626-5
- North Korea Journal (2019) ISBN 978-1786331908
- Into Iraq (2022) ISBN 978-1529153118
- Michael Palin in Venezuela (2025) ISBN 978-1529154726
- Michael Palin in the Philippines (2026) ISBN 978-1529995923

All but the latest three of his travel books can be read with no charge, complete and unabridged, on Palin's Travels website.

=== Autobiography (contributor) ===
- The Pythons Autobiography by The Pythons (2003) ISBN 0-7528-5293-0

=== Diaries ===
- Diaries 1969–1979: The Python Years. 2006. ISBN 978-0-297-84436-5
- Diaries 1980–1988: Halfway to Hollywood – The Film Years. London, Weidenfeld & Nicolson. 2009. ISBN 978-0-297-84440-2
- Diaries 1988–1998: Travelling to Work. London, Weidenfeld & Nicolson. 2014. ISBN 978-0-297-84441-9
- Diaries 1999–2009: There and Back. London, Weidenfeld & Nicolson. 2024. ISBN 978-1-474-61275-3

=== Fiction ===
- Bert Fegg's Nasty Book for Boys and Girls with Terry Jones, illus Martin Honeysett, Frank Bellamy et al. (1974) ISBN 0-413-32740-X
- Dr Fegg's Encyclopaedia of All World Knowledge (1984) (expanded reprint of the above, with Terry Jones and Martin Honeysett) ISBN 0-87226-005-4
- Hemingway's Chair (1995) ISBN 0-7493-1930-5
- The Truth (2012) ISBN 978-0297860211

=== Non-fiction ===
- Erebus: The Story of a Ship (2018, UK) ISBN 978-1847948120
- Erebus: One Ship, Two Epic Voyages, and the Greatest Naval Mystery of All Time (2018, US/Canada) ISBN 978-1771644419
- Great-Uncle Harry: A Tale of War and Empire (2023) ISBN 978-1039001985

=== Children's books ===
- Small Harry and the Toothache Pills (1982) ISBN 0-416-23690-1
- Limerics or The Limerick Book (1985) ISBN 0-09-161540-2
- Cyril and the House of Commons (1986) ISBN 1-85145-078-5
- Cyril and the Dinner Party (1986) ISBN 1-85145-069-6
- The Mirrorstone with Alan Lee and Richard Seymour (1986) ISBN 0-224-02408-6

=== Plays ===
- The Weekend (1994) ISBN 0-413-68940-9

== Awards, honours and legacy ==
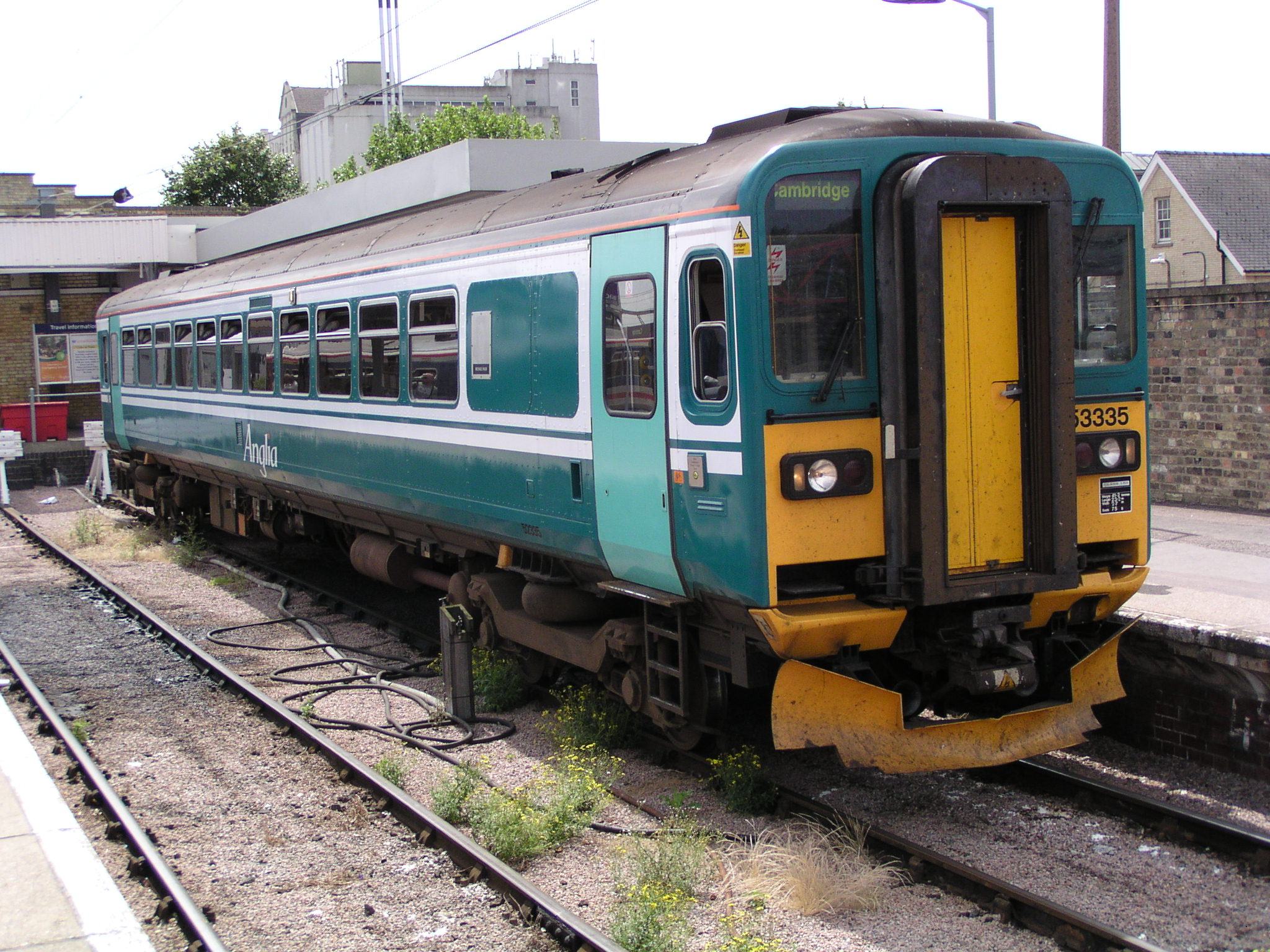
Class 153, no. 153335 Michael Palin at Cambridge in July 2003

Palin was instrumental in setting up the Michael Palin Centre for Stammering Children in 1993. Also in 1993, each member of Monty Python had an asteroid named after them. Palin's is Asteroid 9621 Michaelpalin. In 2003, inside the Globe Theatre a commemorative stone was placed – Palin has his own stone, to mark donors to the theatre, but it is misspelt as "Michael Pallin". The story goes that John Cleese paid for the stone, and mischievously insisted on misspelling his name.

In honour of his achievements as a traveller, especially rail travel, Palin had two British trains named after him. In 2002, Virgin Trains' new £5 million high-speed Super Voyager train number 221130 was named Michael Palin – it carried his name externally and a plaque was located adjacent to the onboard shop with information on Palin and his many journeys. Also, Anglia Railways named a British Rail Class 153 (unit number 153335) after him. (He is a model railway enthusiast.)

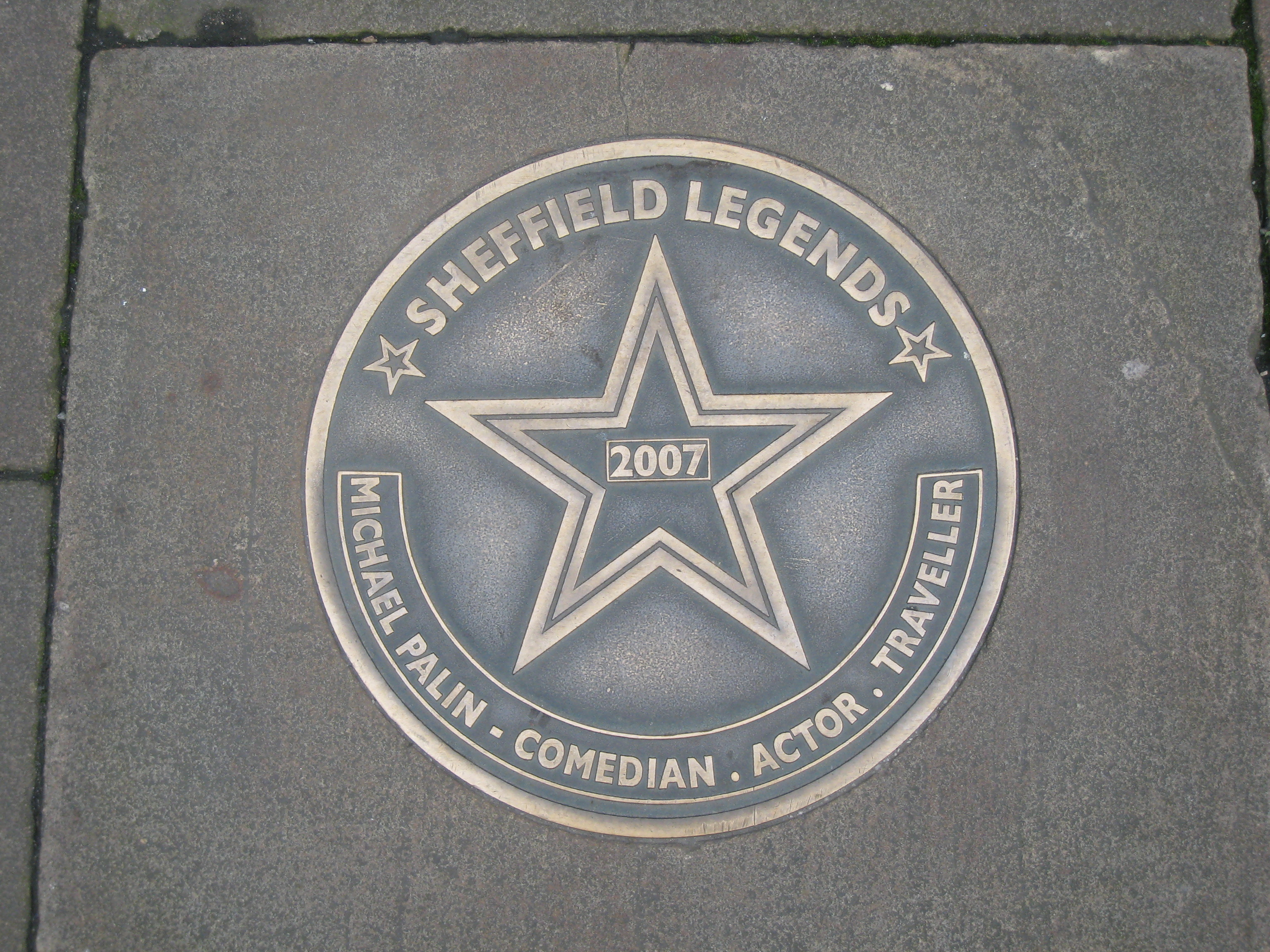
Sheffield Legends plaque in Palin's home city of Sheffield, England

In 2008, he received the James Joyce Award of the Literary and Historical Society in Dublin. In recognition of his services to the promotion of geography, Palin was awarded the Livingstone Medal of the Royal Scottish Geographical Society in March 2009, along with a Fellowship of this Society (FRGS).

In June 2013, he was similarly honoured in Canada with a gold medal for achievements in geography by the Royal Canadian Geographical Society. In June 2009, Palin was elected for a three-year term as President of the Royal Geographical Society. Because of his self-described "amenable, conciliatory character" Michael Palin has been referred to as unofficially "Britain's Nicest Man". In a 2018 poll for Yorkshire Day he was named the greatest Yorkshireman ever, ahead of Sean Bean and Patrick Stewart.

In September 2013, Moorlands School, Leeds, named one of their school houses "Palin" after him. The University of St Andrews awarded Palin an honorary Doctor of Science degree during their June 2017 graduation ceremonies, with the degree recognising his contribution to the public's understanding of contemporary geography. He joins his fellow Pythons John Cleese and Terry Jones in receiving an honorary degree from the Fife institution. In October 2018, the Royal Canadian Geographical Society awarded Palin the first Louie Kamookak Medal for advances in geography, for his book on the history of the polar exploration vessel HMS Erebus.

Palin was appointed a Commander of the Order of the British Empire (CBE) in the 2000 New Year Honours for "services to television drama and travel documentaries". He then was appointed a Knight Commander of the Order of St Michael and St George (KCMG) in the 2019 New Year Honours for "services to travel, culture and geography". Palin is the only member of the Monty Python team to receive a knighthood.

He was elected a Fellow of the Royal Society of Literature in 2020.

In 2017, the British Library acquired Palin's archive consisting of project files relating to his work, notebooks, and personal diaries. The papers in the archive (Add MS 89284) relate to his work with Monty Python, his later TV work, and his children's and humorous books.

BAFTA Awards

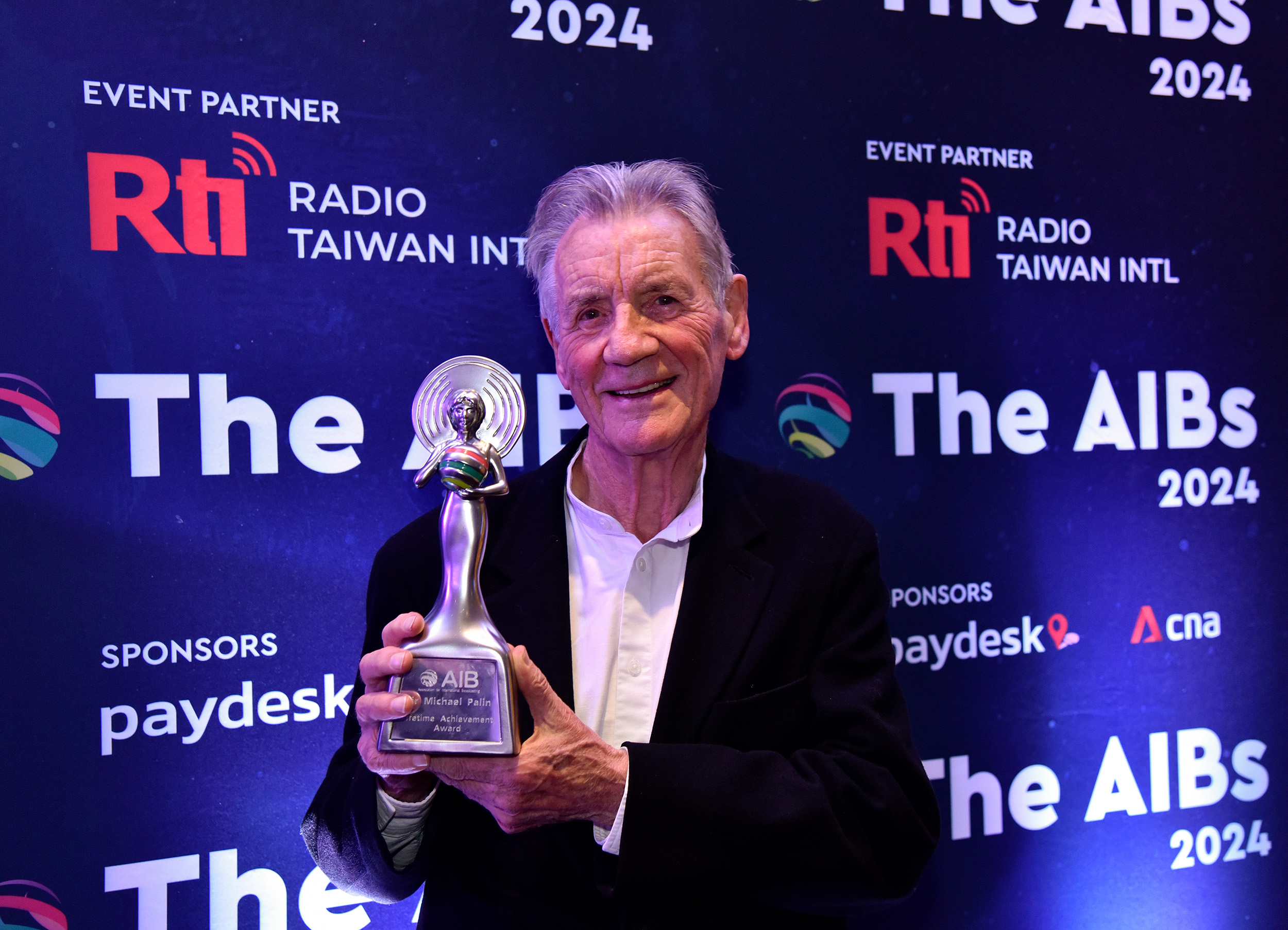
Sir Michael Palin with the AIB Lifetime Achievement Award November 2024

- 1984 Nominated – BAFTA Award for "Best Original Song" (the award was discontinued after the 1985 ceremonies) for Every Sperm is Sacred from The Meaning of Life (shared with André Jacquemin, Dave Howman and Terry Jones)
- 1989 Won – BAFTA Award for Best Actor in a Supporting Role for A Fish Called Wanda (as Ken Pile)
- 1992 Nominated – British Academy Television Award for Best Actor for GBH
- 2005 Won – BAFTA Special Award
- 2009 Won – BAFTA Special Award as part of the Monty Python team for outstanding contribution to film and television
- 2013 Won – BAFTA Academy Fellowship Award

Other awards

- 2011 Awarded the Aardman Slapstick Visual Comedy Legend award for "significant contributions made to the world of comedy".
- 2020 National Television Awards Special Recognition Award
- 2024 Association for International Broadcasting Lifetime Achievement Award
