= The Nearly Complete and Utter History of Everything =

British series of television comedy sketches

- Written by: Mark Burton; Kim Fuller
- Directed by: Dewi Humphreys
- Starring: Clive Anderson; Matthew Ashforde; Patrick Barlow; Ronnie Barker; Helena Bonham Carter; Robert Bathurst; Adam Blackwood; Brian Blessed; Julia Sawalha
- Narrated by: Angus Deayton
- Music by: Philip Pope
- Country of origin: United Kingdom
- Original language: English

Production
- Producers: Jon Plowman; Patricia McGowan; Ali Bryer Carron
- Cinematography: Francis De Groote
- Editor: Steve Punt
- Running time: 65 minutes

Original release
- Network: BBC
- Release: 2 January – 4 January 2000

The Nearly Complete and Utter History of Everything is a collection of television comedy sketches, produced in 1999, broadcast in two parts on 2 and 4 January 2000 on BBC One. Based on well-known historical events, it took its title and concept from the 1969 London Weekend Television series The Complete and Utter History of Britain.

== Cast ==
=== The Ages of Man ===
A version of the class sketch which had previously been broadcast as part of the BBC Millennium programme on 31 December 1999.

- Ronnie Barker – Renaissance Man
- Ronnie Corbett – Medieval Man
- Stephen Fry – Modern Man

=== 1066 ===
The Battle of Hastings staged and described in the style of a modern football match, a version of a sketch from The Complete and Utter History of Britain.

- Clive Anderson – Archbishop of Canterbury
- Ray Clemence – Ray Clemence the Younger
- George Cohen – Master George Cohen
- James Fleet – William of Normandy
- Archie Gemmill – Archie Gemmill, currently in exile
- David Gower – Lord Gower
- Ricky Grover – Aberforth
- Alan Hansen – Lord Alan Hansen
- Geoff Hurst – Sir Geoffrey of Hurst
- Gary Lineker – Lord Gary Lineker
- Rory McGrath – King Harold II
- Peter Osgood – Squire Peter Osgoode
- Martin Peters – Lord Martin Peters
- Steve Punt – French soldier
- Peter Shilton – Peter of Shilton
- Rupert Vansittart – Bishop of Cardiff

=== Geordie of the Antarctic ===
A parody of Scott of the Antarctic.

- Amanda Holden – Geordie's girlfriend
- Bob Mortimer – Geordie
- Vic Reeves – Captain Scott

=== The First Spin Doctor ===
- Martin Clunes – King Henry V
- Angus Deayton – Peter Mandelson
- Martin Trenaman

=== Treaty of Westphalia ===
- Patrick Barlow – Advisor
- Robert Bathurst – English Ambassador
- James Dreyfus – Swedish Ambassador
- Stephen Fry – Ambassador
- Hugh Laurie – French Ambassador

=== Marriage Guidance ===
- Brian Blessed – King Henry VIII
- Jack Dee – Marriage guidance counsellor
- Julia Sawalha – Catherine Parr

=== The Nice-But-Dim Family ===
- Adam Blackwood – Norman
- Richard Briers – Highway robbery victim
- Tim Brooke-Taylor – Earl of Sandwich
- Peter Davison – Duke of Wellington
- Harry Enfield – Tim Norse-But-Dim / Sir Timothy Nice-Butte D'imme / Sir Timothy the Lionbrain / Dim Turpin / Major-General Sir Timothy Nice-But-Dim / Midshipman Nice-But-Dim
- Jessica Stevenson – Woman with Black Death Victim
- Natasha Little – Lady Lionbrain
- Spike Milligan – Admiral Lord Nelson
- Nigel Planer – Lord Cardigan
- Steve Punt – Lord Tampax
- Barbara Windsor – Highway robbery victim

=== Philosophy of a Hairdresser ===
- Thora Hird – Ida
- Victoria Wood – Moira

=== Body Zone ===
- Joan Bakewell – Herself
- Dawn French – Egg
- Jennifer Saunders – Egg

=== A Victorian Evening ===
- James Fleet – Mr Parsons
- Geraldine McNulty – Mrs Richards
- Trevor Peacock – Colonel
- Caroline Quentin – Lady Butterworth

=== Explorers Explorers Explorers ===
- Robert Bathurst – Francis Drake
- Peter Davison – Ferdinand Magellan
- Angus Deayton – Sir Walter Raleigh

=== Holby Village Hospital ===
- Jack Dee – Dr Barber
- Gary Olsen – Mr Baker

=== Early British Comedy ===
- Matthew Ashforde – Reginald
- Helena Bonham Carter – Lily
- Neil Morrissey – Director
- Caroline Quentin – Marcia Bournemouth
- Richard Wilson – Monty DeLauncy

=== When Columbo discovered America ===
- Gareth Hale – Christopher Columbo
- Norman Pace – King Ferdinand

=== Looking Forwards ===
- Lenny Henry – Deakus
- Clive Mantle – Dr Mike Barrat

== See also ==
- The Complete and Utter History of Britain
