= Brazil (Palin book) =

2012 book by Michael Palin

- Author: Michael Palin
- Publisher: Weidenfeld & Nicolson
- Publication date: 11 October 2012

Brazil is a 2012 book by Michael Palin published on 11 October 2012. The book accompanies the TV series Brazil with Michael Palin.

== Audio edition ==
This book is available as an unabridged audiobook, read by Michael Palin and lasting 10 hours, 10 minutes.
