= Last Day of World War One =

2008 episode of the TV series Timewatch

The Last Day of World War One is an episode in the 2008 season of the Television series Timewatch. The programme was a co-production between the Open University and the BBC and aired in November 2008 on BBC 2. The material is presented by Michael Palin who reveals that soldiers continued to be killed in battle for many hours after the Armistice had been signed. Palin recounts the personal stories of the last soldiers to die in the final days, hours and minutes of World War I.

The programme commences with a brief mention of Major General William M. Wright of the United States 89th Division who, according to Palin, sacrificed lives storming the town of Stenay simply so his troops could have a bath; "... that lunatic decision cost something like 300 casualties" according to American historical author Joseph E. Persico.

The German 1918 Spring Offensive was Germany's last attempt to force the British and French to capitulate before the expected arrival of overwhelming American forces. The gamble almost succeeded but the Allies first held and then, in July at the River Marne, pushed back the Germans. On 8 August, "The Black Day of the German Army", the British launched their counter-attack at Amiens. The Germans were forced back and would never recover. They had suffered extremely high casualties in their offensives; the Allied naval blockade was threatening starvation; revolution at home meant troops were fighting both the enemy and their own countrymen; and now American troops were arriving at the front at a rate of 300,000 each month.

Faced with disaster, the German government dispatched a civilian peace delegation under Matthias Erzberger. On 7 November, French soldiers on the front line near La Capelle witnessed the approach of several German cars bearing white flags. The delegation was escorted through the devastated French landscape via Guise and onto Homblières from where they were placed on a train. The train was routed through Tergnier to a gun siding by Rethondes in the forest of Compiègne and the personal train carriage of Marshal Ferdinand Foch, supreme commander of the Allied armies.

Foch was in no mood to compromise and greeted the delegation, "What do you want from me?". The Germans stated that they were there to negotiate an armistice. Foch replied that as far as he was concerned, there would be no negotiation – they were there to receive his terms. A meeting was arranged for the next day from whence the Germans would have 72 hours, from the 8th to 11th, to agree to Foch's terms; Erzberger suggested an immediate ceasefire but this was refused by Foch.

Foch conceded virtually nothing during the ensuing talks. Erzberger was required to telegraph the terms back to the Supreme Command and was told to accept any terms as the situation was so grave; the messages were uncoded and were read by the Allies. At 5:10 am on 11 November 1918, the two sides signed and the news was sent around the world that hostilities would cease at 11:00 am.
