= Class sketch =

Comedy sketch first broadcast in 1966

- Cleese, Barker, and Corbett in the sketch as broadcast in April 1966
- Original language: British English
- Written by: Marty Feldman; John Law
- Series: The Frost Report
- Subject: Social class
- Genre: Observational comedy

Premiere
- Date: April 7, 1966
- Directed by: James Gilbert

The Class sketch is a comedy sketch first broadcast in an episode of David Frost's satirical comedy programme The Frost Report on 7 April 1966. It has been described as a "genuinely timeless sketch, ingeniously satirising the British class system" and in 2005 was voted number 40 in Channel Four's "Britain's 50 Greatest Comedy Sketches". It was written by Marty Feldman and John Law, directed by Jame Gilbert and features John Cleese, Ronnie Barker, and Ronnie Corbett.

== Synopsis ==
Cleese, tall and patrician in appearance and demeanor, represents the upper class; Barker, of average height, the middle class, and Corbett, short in stature, the working class. Their dress also shows class distinction: Cleese in a slim-cut suit and bowler hat, Barker in loose-cut suit and homburg hat, and Corbett in a workman's jacket, scarf, and flat cap. Each in turn describes their social advantages and disadvantages, and contrasts them with their neighbours, an effect emphasised by the actors' relative heights as they look downwards or upwards to each other:

Barker: "I look up to him [Cleese] because he is upper class, but I look down on him [Corbett] because he is lower class." Corbett: "I know my place."

It is this situation that gives Corbett the pay-off line; as the others describe their advantages in the form of "I get ... (e.g. a sense of superiority)", his character finally looks up at the others and says "I get a pain in the back of my neck."

== Reception and influence ==
The British Film Institute commented, "Its twinning of height and social position, combined with a minimal script, created a classic TV moment." The sketch's influence has persisted to the present day, having been referred to in 21st-century discussions of politics, sociology, and even football.

== Spinoffs ==
Ronnie Barker wrote scripts for three further "Three Classes" sketches featuring the same characters, comparing their family life, their leisure activities, and their work.

A spinoff sketch was broadcast on the BBC Millennium programme, satirising three eras of English history. Stephen Fry represents Modern Man, Barker a miller from the Renaissance, and Corbett a weaver serf from the Middle Ages. The basic premise of the sketch is no different from the original. The sketch was incorporated into The Nearly Complete and Utter History of Everything.

Cleese revisited the concept as well with two new partners in 2017 (as a Wealthy Man, a Newspaper Editor and an Average Joe) for a political PSA.
