= Brazil with Michael Palin =

2012 British television travel documentary series

- Written by: Michael Palin
- Presented by: Michael Palin
- Opening theme: David Hartley
- Country of origin: United Kingdom
- Original language: English
- No. of series: 1
- No. of episodes: 4

Production
- Executive producers: Steve Abbott; Roger Mills; Charlotte Moore
- Producer: John-Paul Davidson
- Running time: 55-60 minutes
- Production company: Prominent Television for the BBC

Original release
- Network: BBC One
- Release: 24 October – 14 November 2012

Related
- Michael Palin's New Europe; Michael Palin in North Korea

Brazil with Michael Palin is a travel documentary series by Michael Palin consisting of four episodes, which was first broadcast on BBC One from 24 October to 14 November 2012. Palin had never been to Brazil which, in the 21st century, has become a global player with a booming economy bringing massive social changes to this once-sleeping giant which, as the fifth largest country, is as big as some continents.

The series should not be confused with the 1985 Terry Gilliam film Brazil, which starred Michael Palin.

== Episode one: Out of Africa ==
Palin begins his journey in the northeast, where modern Brazil was born. It was here the Portuguese explorers first landed and encountered the native Brazilians and where hundreds of thousands of African slaves, more than to the United States and Caribbean, were brought to work on sugar and tobacco plantations. The northeast was where this mix of races and cultures produced what we now think of as Brazil. Music, food, dance and religion all bear the imprint of this mix.

Palin visits the city of São Luís during the celebration of its own very northeastern festival of Bumba Meu Boi ("Jump My Bull") before travelling down the coast to Recife and Salvador. On his way, he drops in on the vaqueiros, Brazilian cowboys, who work the massive cattle ranches of the caatinga. His travels also take him to the stunning coastal lagoons of the Lençóis Maranhenses National Park.

In Salvador, Palin learns to drum with the famous Olodum school, experiences the trance and dance of Candomblé, the Afro-Brazilian religion, finds out how to cook Bahian-style and discovers what lies behind the beguiling moves of capoeira dancers.

- UK viewing figures: 5.74 million

== Episode two: Into Amazonia ==
Palin continues his first visit to Brazil by travelling by river and plane from the northern border with Venezuela to the capital of Brasília. Along the way he visits the indigenous tribe Yanomami, accessible only by air, learning about the threat to their hunter-gatherer way of life. He moves on to the city of Manaus, population two million, watching a rehearsal by the Amazon Philharmonic Orchestra in the Manaus Opera House and then taking two ferries on the fourteen-hour journey to the remains of Henry Ford's unsuccessful attempt to build a vast rubber plantation at Fordlândia in the middle of the rainforest. In Belém music producer Priscilla explains why Amazonian women are such a powerful force in the country.

Palin moves southwards travelling to the upper reaches of the Xingu River; he is welcomed to the Wauja tribe, one of the most colourful of all the Brazilian indigenous peoples. Anthropologist Emi Ireland helps explain their rich and complex rituals and the threats to their land and way of life from dam building, deemed necessary for the increasing exploitation of Brazil's abundant natural resources.

In Brasília, constructed in only five years, he meets rock star and political activist Dinho Ouro Preto, who believes that, despite its social and environmental problems, the country is on the brink of becoming a superpower.

- UK viewing figures:

== Episode three: The Road to Rio ==
Palin starts this leg of the journey in the mineral-rich state of Minas Gerais which as the sugar plantations of the north declined provided the new wealth of the country. He visits an old gold mine once owned by the British, before going to see a vast opencast iron ore mine that is fuelling Brazil's economic miracle. He also visits the state capital Belo Horizonte, Brazil's sixth largest city.

From Minas Palin goes down to Rio de Janeiro, population six and half million and capital for 125 years, host to the next 2014 World Cup and the 2016 Olympics. Rio has always had a reputation as a party town but also has suffered from terrible violence, with heavily armed drug gangs controlling the notorious shanty towns or favelas that make up a large part of the city. The authorities have decided to spend some of Brazil's new money on healing the rift between the favelas and the rest of the city. The policy of "pacification" aims to drive the drug gangs out and fund new infrastructure, such as cable cars, and social programmes to make the favelas truly part of the city. Palin visits the BOPE (Special Operations Battalion) used to combat what was (according to what is said in the show) some of the most violent places on Earth and to see how lives have been transformed by pacification.

Palin also finds time to visit some of Rio's best-known locations, learns how to celebrate a goal like a Brazilian radio commentator, and books a room in one of the city's infamous "love hotels".

- UK viewing figures: 4.20 million

== Episode four: The Deep South ==
Palin finds many surprises as he encounters the rich diversity of the more European and Asian cultures that have created a new melting pot in the deep south of Brazil. In the town of Paraty he meets up with Prince João de Bragança (heir to the defunct throne of Brazil when the Portuguese court fled from Napoleon's occupation), who did much to establish the institutions that have enabled Brazil's economy to flourish. Palin visits Embraer, one of the recent high-tech success stories and now the world's third-largest commercial aircraft manufacturer. He takes part in the handover of a jet to the Dutch air carrier KLM.

Palin next moves to the largest city in the southern hemisphere, São Paulo, which is the helicopter capital of the world with over 400 helicopters avoiding the massive traffic jams below. He visits the studios of Brazil's popular soap operas that not rarely last more than eight months. He visits Japanese residents who comprise 1.5 million of the population, with their own newspaper. Palin is then taken to the home of rap star, philosopher and poet Criolo in the slums of São Paulo, who thinks the notion of social equality is a distant dream for most Brazilians. This view is countered by a visit to ex-president Fernando Henrique Cardoso, who gives a more optimistic vision.

Travelling south to Blumenau and Pomerode, Palin finds German speakers stubbornly sticking to their German roots in their buildings and customs.

In the vast wetlands of the Pantanal Palin catches a piranha, which is instantly turned into sashimi by his guide. He helps the cowboys treat a calf attacked by a jaguar, and sees the diversity of the wildlife. Palin's journey ends at the Iguazu Falls, where he concludes that Brazil has much to offer the world as it takes its place as a new superpower.

- UK viewing figures: 3.53 million

== Book ==
Brazil, a book to accompany the series, was published on 11 October 2012.
