= Sadie, It's Cold Outside =

1975 British TV sitcom

- Genre: Sitcom
- Written by: Jack Rosenthal
- Directed by: Mike Vardy
- Starring: Rosemary Leach; Bernard Hepton
- Composer: Carl Davis
- Country of origin: United Kingdom
- Original language: English
- No. of series: 1
- No. of episodes: 7

Production
- Producer: Mike Vardy
- Running time: 30 minutes
- Production company: Thames Television

Original release
- Network: ITV
- Release: 21 April – 26 May 1975

Sadie, It's Cold Outside is a British comedy television series that originally aired as a pilot on ITV in 1974 before a full series of six episodes was broadcast the following year. Created and written by Jack Rosenthal it starred Rosemary Leach as a housewife bored by her dull routine. The title references the song "Baby, It's Cold Outside".

== Cast ==
- Rosemary Leach as Sadie Potter
- Bernard Hepton as Norman Potter
- Patrick Newell as Shop keeper
- Lesley Joseph as Cashier
- Janet Davies as Receptionist
- Donald Sumpter as Plumber
- John Ringham as Mr Callaghan
- Robert Gillespie as Doctor

== Bibliography ==
- Perry, Christopher . The British Television Pilot Episodes Research Guide 1936-2015. 2015.
- Vice, Sue. Jack Rosenthal. Manchester University Press, 2013.
