= Michael Palin in North Korea =

2018 British television travel documentary series

- Written by: Michael Palin
- Presented by: Michael Palin
- Country of origin: United Kingdom
- Original language: English
- No. of series: 1
- No. of episodes: 2

Production
- Production company: Channel 5

Original release
- Network: Channel 5
- Release: 20 September – 27 September 2018

Related
- Brazil with Michael Palin; Michael Palin: Into Iraq

Michael Palin in North Korea (also known as North Korea: Michael Palin's Journey and North Korea From the Inside With Michael Palin) is a travel documentary presented by Michael Palin and first aired in the UK in 2 parts on Channel 5 on 20 September and 27 September 2018.

== Programme history ==
The programme was made by ITN Productions, who had proposed a North Korean documentary to various channels under the title Let's All Go to North Korea. Channel 5's Director of Programmes, Ben Frow, was not interested in the project at first, but after Michael Palin was hired to front the programme, he changed his mind and decided to commission it for the channel.

Michael Palin in North Korea recorded viewing figures of 4.5 million, and was nominated for two BAFTAs, while a "special edition" featuring the first two parts and previously unseen footage was aired on Channel 5 on 27 December 2018.

Palin also wrote a companion book for the series, North Korea Journal.

In 2022, Channel 5 commissioned a follow-up from ITN Productions called Michael Palin: Into Iraq, which saw Palin crossing the country following the route of the Tigris river from its source at Lake Hazar in Turkey to the Persian Gulf. Similar to his previous trips, a companion book was also released.

== International airings ==
The documentary aired on 30 September 2018 in North America on National Geographic with the title North Korea from the Inside with Michael Palin.

== Episodes ==
In the first episode, Palin arrives in North Korea on a train from China. He is greeted by his guides, a woman named Li Soo-young and a man named Li Kyung-chul. Palin's guides bring him to sites across Pyongyang, including statues of the first leader of North Korea, Kim Il-Sung, and his son and the DPRK's second leader, Kim Jong-il.

In the second episode, Palin celebrates his 75th birthday in North Korea, and travels to the Demilitarized Zone that divides North and South Korea, the ancient Korean capital at Kaesong, Mount Kumgang, and the coastal city of Wonsan. Palin then flies from Wonsan to Mount Paektu on the border with China before returning to Pyongyang, where he visits members of the North Korean national taekwondo team.
