= When the Dog Dies =

BBC radio sitcom

When the Dog Dies is a BBC Radio 4 sitcom starring Ronnie Corbett as Sandy Hopper, a retired man whose family want him to leave his house, and Liza Tarbuck as his lodger Dolores. Like the 1980s sitcom Sorry!, the show is written by Ian Davidson and Peter Vincent.

== Plot ==
The stories revolve around Sandy's children's attempts to get him to "downsize" or move into a retirement home (so they can sell his house and get the money) and the various relationships between his family members, Dolores, and the men in her life. Sandy refuses to go till his dog, Henry, dies.

== Cast ==
- Ronnie Corbett as Sandy Hopper
- Liza Tarbuck as his lodger Dolores
- Tilly Vosburgh as his daughter Ellie
- Jonathan Aris (series 1–3) and Dave Lamb (series 4) as Ellie's husband Blake
- Daniel Bridle as their son Tyson
- Philip Bird as Sandy's son Lance
- Grace Vance as his granddaughter Calais
- Sally Grace as Mrs Pompom (a dog walker Sandy meets, named after her dog Pom Pom)

== Production ==
The series is written by Ian Davidson and Peter Vincent, and produced by CPL Productions for the BBC. Four series have been broadcast, from 2010 to 2014, with repeats on BBC Radio 4 Extra. The fourth series is to be the last.

== Episodes ==
Series 1

1. The Same Hymn Sheet
2. Spying is Believing
3. The Rival Granddad
4. Portrait of the Artist as an Old Man
5. Squeaky Shoes
6. Desperately Seeking Dolores

Series 2

1. Catchment If You Can
2. Knock Down Ginger.
3. Temptation
4. The Never Ending Story
5. Tangled Web
6. It was A Dark and Stormy Night

Series 3

1. Where There's A Will
2. Auntie's Ashes
3. The Secret of Youth
4. Full Fathom Five
5. It's That Song Again
6. Mammon and Other Demons

Series 4

1. Gone in a Flash
2. The Call of the Wild
3. Ships That Pass
4. The Hills Are Alive
5. One Dog and his Man
6. Twilight of the Gods
