= John Law (writer) =

John Law (11 November 1929 – 5 January 1970) was a British comedy writer for television, who created the Class sketch for The Frost Report.

== Life ==
Law was born 11 November 1929, in Paisley, Renfrewshire, Scotland. He married Beryl Kaye (1919–2010) a dancer and choreographer, and died 5 January 1970, aged 40.

== Work ==
He wrote for many TV comedy series, including It's a Square World and The Frost Report, working with Michael Bentine and Marty Feldman. He also worked on the screenplay for the James Bond spoof film Casino Royale, having been recruited for this project by Peter Sellers.
