= Ronnie Corbett's Supper Club =

2011 British TV pilot

- Genre: Cookery talk-show
- Presented by: Ronnie Corbett
- Country of origin: United Kingdom
- Original language: English
- No. of episodes: 1 (Pilot)

Production
- Running time: 45 Minutes approx
- Production company: Talkback Thames

Original release
- Network: Good Food HD
- Release: 31 August 2011

Ronnie Corbett's Supper Club is a television pilot that was broadcast on the UKTV channel Good Food on 31 August 2010. It was hosted by Scottish comedian Ronnie Corbett, who cooked his guest's chosen meal as if it were to be their last. Corbett's guests in the Pilot were Welsh comedian Rob Brydon and actor Steve Speirs.
