= Palin's Column =

- Starring: Michael Palin
- Country of origin: United Kingdom
- Original language: English
- No. of series: 1
- No. of episodes: 4

Original release
- Network: ITV Meridian
- Release: 6 June – 27 June 1994

Palin's Column is a 1994 ITV Meridian television series presented by comedian and travel presenter Michael Palin. It records his time spent in the role of a journalist on the Isle of Wight.

== Episodes ==
The series is divided up into four episodes.

No.	Title	Original release date
1	"Black and Wight Magic"	6 June 1994
2	"A Gap in the Market"	13 June 1994
3	"Old Haunts"	20 June 1994
4	"I Came, I Saw, I Conkered"	27 June 1994
