= Rosemary Leach =

British actress (1935–2017)

- Leach in 1981
- Born: Rosemary Anne Leach; 18 December 1935; Much Wenlock, Shropshire, England
- Died: 21 October 2017 (aged 81); London, England
- Occupation: Actress
- Years active: 1960–2017
- Spouse: Colin Starkey (m. 1981)

Rosemary Anne Leach (18 December 1935 – 21 October 2017) was a British stage, television and film actress. She won the 1982 Olivier Award for Best Actress in a New Play for 84, Charing Cross Road and was nominated for the BAFTA Award for Best Actress in a Supporting Role for her roles in the films That'll Be the Day (1973) and A Room with a View (1985).

She appeared in several TV mini-series, including Germinal (1970), The Jewel in the Crown (1984), The Charmer (1987), The Buccaneers (1995) and Berkeley Square (1998), and had a recurring role on the sitcom My Family (2003–2007).

== Early life ==
Leach was born at Much Wenlock, Shropshire. Her parents were teachers, related to the social anthropologist Edmund Leach; she attended Oswestry Girls High School in Shropshire. before studying acting at Royal Academy of Dramatic Art (RADA), graduating in 1955 with an Acting (RADA Diploma).

== Career ==
After appearing in repertory theatres and the Old Vic, she became well known to UK TV viewers between 1965 and 1969 for playing Susan Wheldon, the mistress of building tycoon John Wilder (Patrick Wymark) in the TV boardroom drama The Power Game.

In 1970, she played the part of Marcelle in the BBC's The Roads to Freedom, their adaptation of the trilogy of novels with the same name by Jean-Paul Sartre. In 1971, she appeared as Laurie Lee's mother in a BBC adaptation of Cider with Rosie.

In 1973, she played Aldonza/Dulcinea in the BBC production of Don Quixote (retitled The Adventures of Don Quixote), starring Rex Harrison and Frank Finlay. In 1978, she played Queen Victoria in the four-part TV edition of Disraeli. In 1981, she played Emilia opposite Bob Hoskins's Iago in the BBC Shakespeare production of Othello.

In 1982, she played Aunt Fenny in The Jewel in the Crown and 1986 in a Jack Rosenthal British television Christmas play Day To Remember. She played a leading role as smitten Joan Plumleigh-Bruce in the six-part ITV 1987 production of The Charmer which starred Nigel Havers.

Her film roles included David Essex's mother in That'll Be the Day (1973), Ghost in the Noonday Sun (1973), the TV remake of Brief Encounter (1974), S.O.S. Titanic (1979), and a voice role in the animated film of The Plague Dogs (1982).

In 1987, she was nominated for BAFTA's Best Supporting Actress for A Room with a View (1985). In 1992, Leach starred in An Ungentlemanly Act, a BBC television film about the first days of the invasion of the Falkland Islands in 1982, portraying the real-life Lady Mavis Hunt, wife of the islands' then governor, Sir Rex Hunt. In 1995, Leach participated in the popular BBC miniseries The Buccaneers a five-part television adaptation of Edith Wharton's unfinished novel. Leach appeared as Selina Marable, Marchioness of Brightlingsea.

Leach played the part of Anna in BBC Radio 4's No Commitments, and Susan Harper's mother Grace in My Family. She made a guest appearance as 'Bessie' on Waterloo Road (the TV series), in Series 3 Spring Term. From 1994, she made occasional appearances in The Archers as Ellen Rogers, the ex-pat aunt of Nigel Pargetter. She portrayed Miss Twitterton in the Radio 4 adaptation of the Lord Peter Wimsey story Busman's Honeymoon, first broadcast in 1983.

In 2001, she played a leading role in Destroying Angel, an episode of Midsomer Murders. She played Queen Elizabeth II three times: in the 2002 television movie Prince William; in a 2006 updated edition of The Afternoon Play entitled Tea with Betty; and in 2009's Margaret. She played "Miss Plum" in an episode of Heartbeat called "Every dog his day" in 2004.

== Death ==
Leach died at Charing Cross Hospital, in London, aged 81, in 2017 following a short illness.

== Filmography ==
=== Film ===
Year	Title	Role	Notes
1973	That'll Be the Day	Mrs. MacLaine	
1974	Ghost in the Noonday Sun	Kate	
1975	When Day Is Done		
1979	A Question of Faith	Anna Petrovna	
1981	Turtle Diary	Mrs. Charlie Inchcliff	
1982	The Plague Dogs	Vera	Voice
1985	A Room with a View	Mrs. Honeychurch	
1985	Ha-Kala	Esther	Also known as The 17th Bride
1990	The Children	Miss Scope	
1993	The Mystery of Edwin Drood	Mrs. Tope	
1993	The Hawk	Mrs. Marsh	
1998	Bloodlines: Legacy of a Lord	Lady Osborne	
1999	Whatever Happened to Harold Smith?	Harold's Mother	
2000	Breathtaking	Mrs. Henshaw	
2002	The Baroness and the Pig	Margaret	
2010	Mission London	Miss Cunningham	
2011	The Great Ghost Rescue	The Queen	
2012	May I Kill U?	Mags	

=== Television ===
Year	Title	Role	Notes
1960	Police Surgeon	WPC	Episode: "Smash But No Grab"
1962–63	Z-Cars	Mrs Outram/Ann Brown	2 episodes
1963-68	Armchair Theatre	Various	5 episodes
1964	Edgar Wallace Mysteries	Mary Bell	Episode: "Face of a Stranger"
1964	Gideon's Way	Marion Grove	Episode: "The Lady-Killer"
1965	Public Eye	Judy Manning	Episode: "They Go Off in the End, Like Fruit"
1965	Sherlock Holmes	Kitty Winter	Episode: "The Illustrious Client"
1965–66	The Power Game	Susan Weldon	21 episodes
1967–70	No – That's Me Over Here!	Rosemary	25 episodes
1967–70	The Wednesday Play	Various	4 episodes
1968-75	Jackanory	Storyteller	35 episodes
1969	Strange Report	Mary Hanson	Episode: "REPORT 2475 Revenge 'When a man hates'"
1970	The Roads to Freedom	Marcelle	8 episodes
1971-3	Now Look Here	Laura	10 episodes
1971-1982	Play of the Month	Various	3 episodes
1972	Cider with Rosie	Mother	TV film
1974	The Prince of Denmark	Laura	6 episodes
1974	Brief Encounter	Mrs Gaines	TV film
1975	Sadie, It's Cold Outside	Sadie	6 episodes
1976	Play for Today	Rita	Episode: Tiptoe Through the Tulips
1978	Rumpole of the Bailey	Mrs. Ida Tempest	Episode: Rumpole and the Man of God
1978–80	Life Begins at Forty	Katy Bunting	ITV sitcom, 2 series 14 episodes
1984	The Jewel in the Crown	Aunt Fenny	TV mini-series, 7 episodes
1984	Swallows and Amazons Forever!	Mrs Barrable	8-part (or two movie-length episodes) BBC adaptation of Coot Club and The Big Six
1987	The Charmer	Joan Plumleigh-Bruce	TV mini-series, 6 episodes
1989	Boon	Marigold Sampson	Episode: "Banbury Blue"
1989	Theatre Night	Violet	Episode: The Winslow Boy
1989	Summer's Lease	Nancy Leadbetter	4 episodes
1992	An Ungentlemanly Act	Mavis Hunt	BBC Film
1995	The Buccaneers	Lady Brightlingsea	5 episodes
1995	The Tomorrow People	Gladys Toms	Serial: "The Living Stones"
1993	The World of Peter Rabbit and Friends	Tabitha Twitchit (voice)	2 episodes
1995	Chiller	Mrs. Leslie	Episode: "Toby"
1996	Spywatch	Amy Hobbs	10 episodes
1996-2000	Brambly Hedge	Lady Daisy Woodmouse, Mrs Ivy Eyebright (voices)	8 episodes
1997	An Unsuitable Job For A Woman	Miss Markland	1 episode
1998	Berkeley Square	Nanny Collins	10 episodes
2000–05	Doctors	Josephine Barker/Meg Carpenter	2 episodes
2000–2005	Down to Earth	Irene	5 episodes
2001	Midsomer Murders	Evelyn Pope	Episode: "Destroying Angel"
2003–07	My Family	Grace Riggs	6 episodes
2004	Holby City	Barbara Rush	Episode: One More Chance
2004–05	Heartbeat	Dorothy Plum	2 episodes
2006	The Afternoon Play	HM the Queen	Episode: Tea with Betty
2007	Casualty	Miranda Watts	Episode: Strangers When We Meet
2008	Waterloo Road	Bessie	1 episode
2009	Margaret	Queen Elizabeth II	TV film

== Radio plays ==
- Shirley Gee: Moonshine (1977)
- Penny in "Love's Executioner" in the series True Encounters with Henry Goodman and Ben Daniels directed by John Taylor, a Fiction Factory production for BBC Radio 4. (1996)

== Awards and nominations ==
Year	Award	Category	Work	Result	Ref
1971	BAFTA TV Award	Best Actress	Germinal / The Roads to Freedom	Nominated	
1972	BAFTA TV Award	Best Actress	ITV Playhouse / Cider with Rosie	Nominated	
1974	BAFTA TV Award	Best Actress	The Adventures of Don Quixote	Nominated	
1974	BAFTA Film Award	Best Supporting Actress	That'll Be the Day	Nominated	
1977	Olivier Award	Best Actress in a New Play	Just Between Ourselves	Nominated	
1982	Olivier Award	Best Actress in a New Play	84 Charing Cross Road	Won	
1987	BAFTA Film Award	Best Supporting Actress	A Room with a View	Nominated	
1994	Olivier Award	Best Actress in a Supporting Role	Separate Tables	Nominated	
