= The Complete and Utter History of Britain =

British LWT comedy sketch show, 1969

- Created by: Terry Jones; Michael Palin
- Starring: Wallas Eaton; Colin Gordon; Terry Jones; Roddy Maude-Roxby; Melinda May; Michael Palin; Diana Quick
- Opening theme: Barry Booth
- Ending theme: Barry Booth
- Country of origin: United Kingdom
- Original language: English
- No. of episodes: 6

Production
- Executive producer: Humphrey Barclay
- Running time: 25 minutes

Original release
- Network: London Weekend Television
- Release: 12 January – 16 February 1969

Related
- The Nearly Complete and Utter History of Everything (2000)

The Complete and Utter History of Britain is a 1969 television comedy sketch show. It was created and written by Michael Palin and Terry Jones between the two series of Do Not Adjust Your Set. It was produced for and broadcast by London Weekend Television but was not shown in all of the other ITV regions.

== Concept ==
The idea (inspired by a sketch in an earlier show, Twice a Fortnight) was to replay history as if television had been around at the time. Sketches included interviews with the vital characters in the dressing-room after the Battle of Hastings, Samuel Pepys presenting a television chat-show and an estate agent trying to sell Stonehenge to a young couple looking for their first home ("It's got character, charm and a slab in the middle").

Seven programmes were written and produced, but LWT amalgamated the first two episodes into a single episode (all still for a half-hour slot), so that it was shown on TV as a six-part series. Episode One (as broadcast) used some of the material that was originally planned for the first two episodes, but it also contained new linking and a new sketch (about the Domesday Book).

For many years, the entire series was believed to have been wiped. However, copies of the first two episodes (as broadcast) were eventually found, along with the complete first two episodes 'as produced'. The latter were in the form of poor quality video recordings, in CV-2000 format, with visible line structure and numerous instances of dropout. These were taken from the personal collection of the director, Maurice Murphy.

Terry Jones expressed dissatisfaction with the series, complaining (after a showing of surviving episodes) that the pacing was off and the soundtrack all wrong.

It was doing The Complete and Utter History of Britain that got me really convinced that you have to control everything. You not only act in the things - you've got to actually start directing the thing as well.

Michael Palin recalled that the failure of the show helped bring about the formation of Monty Python later the same year, saying:

John Cleese called me when it went out and said, "I’ve just seen this series of yours. You won’t be making any more of those, will you? So why don’t we do something together?".

In 2023 the remaining four, hitherto missing, episodes were found in the ITV archive, having been mis-catalogued for years. After being correctly identified, the 16-mm tele-recordings were restored, making them available for the first time since the original broadcasts.

== Cast ==
=== Main ===
- Michael Palin
- Terry Jones
- Wallas Eaton
- Melinda May
- Diana Quick

=== With ===
- Ted Carson
- Colin Cunningham
- Gay Hamilton
- Joy Harrison
- John Hughman
- Rosemary Lord
- Johnny Vyvyan
- Roddy Maude-Roxby

=== Narrated by ===
- Colin Gordon

== Episodes ==
- 1st unaired episode ---- From the Dawn of History to the first Christians
- 2nd unaired episode ---- From the Age of Kings to the Norman Conquest
- Episode 1 -- 12 January 1969 ---- From the Dawn of History to the Norman Conquest
- Episode 2 -- 19 January 1969 ---- Richard the Lionheart to Robin the Hood
- Episode 3 -- 26 January 1969 ---- Edward the First to Richard the Last
- Episode 4 -- 2 February 1969 ---- Perkin Warbeck to Bloody Mary
- Episode 5 -- 9 February 1969 ---- The Great and Glorious Age of Elizabeth
- Episode 6 -- 16 February 1969 -- James the McFirst to Oliver Cromwell

== Home media ==
On 7 April 2014, Network Distributing released all known extant material on a Blu-ray/DVD set in the UK. This release included the first two episodes as broadcast, the first two episodes as recorded, which included the material removed from the TV broadcasts, and all available film inserts. New linking material for film inserts was recorded by Jones and Palin especially for this release, and included as a 50-minute programme entitled The New Incomplete Complete and Utter History of Britain.

Following the discovery of the remaining episodes, the entire series became available to stream in the UK on Britbox and ITVX in September 2023. However, the two untransmitted episodes (as seen on the box set mentioned above) were not included.

== See also ==
- The Nearly Complete and Utter History of Everything
- History Bites
- Horrible Histories
