= Michael Palin in Venezuela =

2025 British television travel documentary series

- Written by: Michael Palin
- Presented by: Michael Palin
- Theme music composer: Miguel d'Oliveira
- Country of origin: United Kingdom
- Original language: English
- No. of series: 1
- No. of episodes: 3

Production
- Production location: Venezuela
- Running time: 45
- Production company: ITN Productions

Original release
- Network: Channel 5
- Release: 16 September – 30 September 2025

Michael Palin in Venezuela is a television travel documentary presented by Michael Palin and first aired on 5 in the UK in three parts on 16, 23 and 30 September 2025. The series takes Palin to Venezuela, "an often-troubled, little explored country of extremes".

Palin released a book to accompany the series.
