= Now Look Here =

British TV sitcom (1971–1973)

- DVD cover
- Genre: Sitcom
- Created by: Barry Cryer
- Starring: Ronnie Corbett; Rosemary Leach; Linda Hayden; Madge Ryan; Donald Hewlett; Richard O'Sullivan
- Country of origin: United Kingdom
- No. of series: 2
- No. of episodes: 14

Production
- Running time: 30 minutes

Original release
- Network: BBC1
- Release: 5 November 1971 – 7 March 1973

Related
- The Prince of Denmark

Now Look Here is a BBC sitcom that ran for two series of seven episodes each during 1971 to 1973. It was written by Barry Cryer and Graham Chapman.

It starred Ronnie Corbett, who played a character of the same name. He was cast in a similar role to his character in the later, longer-running and better-known sitcom, Sorry!, as an overgrown mother's boy who was trying to break away from his mother (played by Madge Ryan) but having some difficulty doing so. However, it differs from the later series in that he does leave home after a few episodes, although his new home is only a few doors away, his father is deceased and he does not have any siblings. In the second series, he was married, his wife is played by Rosemary Leach. His boss was played by Donald Hewlett.

All episodes still exist, although one of these survived in the American NTSC standard, from which it has been converted.

== See also ==
- The Prince of Denmark – 1974 sequel with Corbett and Leach.
