= Michael Palin: Into Iraq =

2022 British television travel documentary series

- Written by: Michael Palin
- Presented by: Michael Palin
- Theme music composer: Miguel d'Oliveira
- Country of origin: United Kingdom
- Original language: English
- No. of series: 1
- No. of episodes: 3

Production
- Production location: Iraq
- Production company: ITN Productions

Original release
- Network: Channel 5
- Release: 20 September – 4 October 2022

Related
- Michael Palin in North Korea

Michael Palin: Into Iraq is a travel documentary presented by Michael Palin and first aired in the UK in three parts on Channel 5 on 20 September, 27 September and 4 October 2022. In the series, Palin takes a 1,000-mile (1,600 km) journey, following the course of the Tigris river from its source in eastern Turkey, through Iraq to the Persian Gulf.

Palin released a book Into Iraq to accompany the TV series.
