= Diaries 1969–1979: The Python Years =

2006 book by Michael Palin

Diaries 1969-1979: The Python Years
- First edition
- Author: Michael Palin
- Language: English
- Publisher: Weidenfeld & Nicolson
- Publication date: 3 October 2006
- ISBN: 978-0-297-84436-5

Diaries 1969–1979: The Python Years, dedicated by Michael Palin to his mother and father, has reduced "mountains to molehills", according to his own words, to take the reader inside the period of the author's life that corresponds to the Monty Python era. In the introduction Palin states that he began keeping this specific diary (there was an aborted attempt at age 11) in April 1969, at 25 years of age, one month before the Python experience began in earnest. The diary started as a means to keep away from smoking, after fellow Python Terry Gilliam accused him of being addicted to cigarettes. Palin has continued the diary, written on Ryman's reporter's notepads, for 37 years (up to January 2006). The first entry on the book-diary corresponds to 17 April 1969, and there is a four-month gap after 11 August 1971, owed, according to the Palin's family folklore, to William's (his second son) stage of "putting things inside other things"; in this case the reporter's pad in the rubbish bin. The diary resumes December, 1971, and the last entry corresponds to 31 December 1979.

The book mainly takes the reader through the everyday life of the author, who manages to keep his feet on the ground through the stresses of fame and fortune, and someone whose happy family make his achievements as an entertainer less enviable than his home life.

Palin mentions his work as actor, writer (Monty Python's Flying Circus, Monty Python and the Holy Grail, Monty Python's Life of Brian, Jabberwocky, Ripping Yarns), his growing family (his son Thomas was six months old when the diary begins, and then William and Rachel joined the family), his father's illness and death, his hatred for U.S. president Richard Nixon, and his self search for something else, as if what he had going on was not enough, at least intellectually.
