= The Prince of Denmark (TV series) =

1974 British TV comedy series

- Genre: Comedy
- Written by: Graham Chapman; Barry Cryer
- Starring: Ronnie Corbett; Rosemary Leach
- Country of origin: United Kingdom
- Original language: English
- No. of series: 1
- No. of episodes: 6

Production
- Producer: Douglas Argent
- Running time: 30 minutes
- Production company: BBC

Original release
- Network: BBC 1
- Release: 10 April – 15 May 1974

The Prince of Denmark is a British comedy television series which first aired on BBC 1 in 1974. It was made as a sequel to Now Look Here.

== Main cast ==
- Ronnie Corbett as Ronnie
- Rosemary Leach as Laura
- David Warwick as Steve
- Michael Nightingale as Crossword man
- Tim Barrett as Blackburn
- Declan Mulholland as Danny
- Penny Irving as Polly

== Bibliography ==
- Stephen Wagg. Because I Tell a Joke or Two: Comedy, Politics and Social Difference. Routledge, 2004.
