= The Frost Report =

British TV comedy series, 1966–1967

- Opening title from series one
- Genre: Comedy
- Written by: Graham Chapman; Marty Feldman; John Law
- Presented by: David Frost
- Starring: Ronnie Corbett; Ronnie Barker; John Cleese; Sheila Steafel; Nicky Henson; Julie Felix; Tom Lehrer
- Country of origin: United Kingdom
- Original language: English
- No. of series: 2
- No. of episodes: 26 (plus 2 specials)

Production
- Producer: James Gilbert
- Running time: 30 minutes

Original release
- Network: BBC1
- Release: 10 March 1966 – 26 December 1967

The Frost Report is a satirical television show hosted by David Frost. It introduced John Cleese, Ronnie Barker, and Ronnie Corbett to television and launched the careers of other writers and performers. It premiered on BBC1 on 10 March 1966 and ended on 12 December 1967, with a total of 26 regular episodes over the course of two series and two specials, as well.

== Cast and writers ==
Cleese, Barker, and Corbett in the Class sketch broadcast in April 1966

The main cast were Frost, Corbett, Cleese, Barker, Sheila Steafel, and Nicky Henson. Musical interludes were provided by Julie Felix, while Tom Lehrer also performed songs in a few episodes.

Writers and performers on The Frost Report later worked on many other television shows. They included Bill Oddie and Tim Brooke-Taylor (of the Goodies), Barry Cryer, Ronnie Barker, Ronnie Corbett, Dick Vosburgh, Spike Mullins (who would write Corbett's Two Ronnies monologues), Antony Jay (Yes Minister and Yes Prime Minister), and future Monty Python members Graham Chapman, John Cleese, Eric Idle, Terry Jones, and Michael Palin. It was while working on The Frost Report that the future Pythons developed their writing style. The established comedy writer Marty Feldman, as well as the Frank Muir and Denis Norden partnership, were also contributors to the programme.

A special compilation from series 1, titled "Frost over England" (featuring the classic Cleese/Barker/Corbett class sketch, which parodied the British class system) won the Rose d'Or at the 1967 Montreux festival. A special one-off reunion was broadcast on Easter Monday (24 March) 2008. It ran for 90 minutes and was followed by "Frost over England".

== Archive status ==
The entire second series, with the exceptions of "The Frost Report on Women" and the "Frost Over Christmas" special, are missing from the BBC archives and are considered lost. Home-recorded audio tapes are known to exist for all of these.

== Episodes ==
=== Series overview ===
Series	Episodes	Originally released	
Series	Episodes	First released	Last released
1	13	10 March 1966	9 June 1966
Special		26 March 1967	
2	13	6 April 1967	29 June 1967
Special		26 December 1967	

=== Series 1 (1966) ===
No. overall	No. in series	Title	Original release date
1	1	"The Frost Report on Authority"	10 March 1966
2	2	"The Frost Report on Holidays"	17 March 1966
3	3	"The Frost Report on Sin"	24 March 1966
4	4	"The Frost Report on Elections"	31 March 1966
5	5	"The Frost Report on Class"	7 April 1966
6	6	"The Frost Report on the News"	14 April 1966
7	7	"The Frost Report on Education"	21 April 1966
8	8	"The Frost Report on Love"	28 April 1966
9	9	"The Frost Report on Law"	12 May 1966
10	10	"The Frost Report on Leisure"	19 May 1966
11	11	"The Frost Report on Medicine"	26 May 1966
12	12	"The Frost Report on Food and Drink"	2 June 1966
13	13	"The Frost Report on Trends"	9 June 1966

=== Special (1967) ===
Title	Original release date
"Frost Over England"	26 March 1967

=== Series 2 (1967) ===
No. overall	No. in series	Title	Original release date
14	1	"The Frost Report on Money"	6 April 1967
15	2	"The Frost Report on Women"	13 April 1967
16	3	"The Frost Report on the Forces"	20 April 1967
17	4	"The Frost Report on Advertising"	27 April 1967
18	5	"The Frost Report on Parliament"	4 May 1967
19	6	"The Frost Report on the Countryside"	11 May 1967
20	7	"The Frost Report on Industry"	18 May 1967
21	8	"The Frost Report on Culture"	25 May 1967
22	9	"The Frost Report on Transport"	1 June 1967
23	10	"The Frost Report on Crime"	8 June 1967
24	11	"The Frost Report on Europe"	15 June 1967
25	12	"The Frost Report on Youth"	22 June 1967
26	13	"The Frost Report on Showbusiness"	29 June 1967

=== Christmas special (1967) ===
Title	Original release date
"Frost Over Christmas"	26 December 1967

== Similar shows ==
David Frost hosted related comedy shows with similar casts. These included Frost on Sunday in 1968 with the two Ronnies, Josephine Tewson, and Sam Costa. The same year, he presented Frost on Saturday. There was a reunion show, The Frost Report is Back, broadcast in 2008.

== "Lord Privy Seal" ==
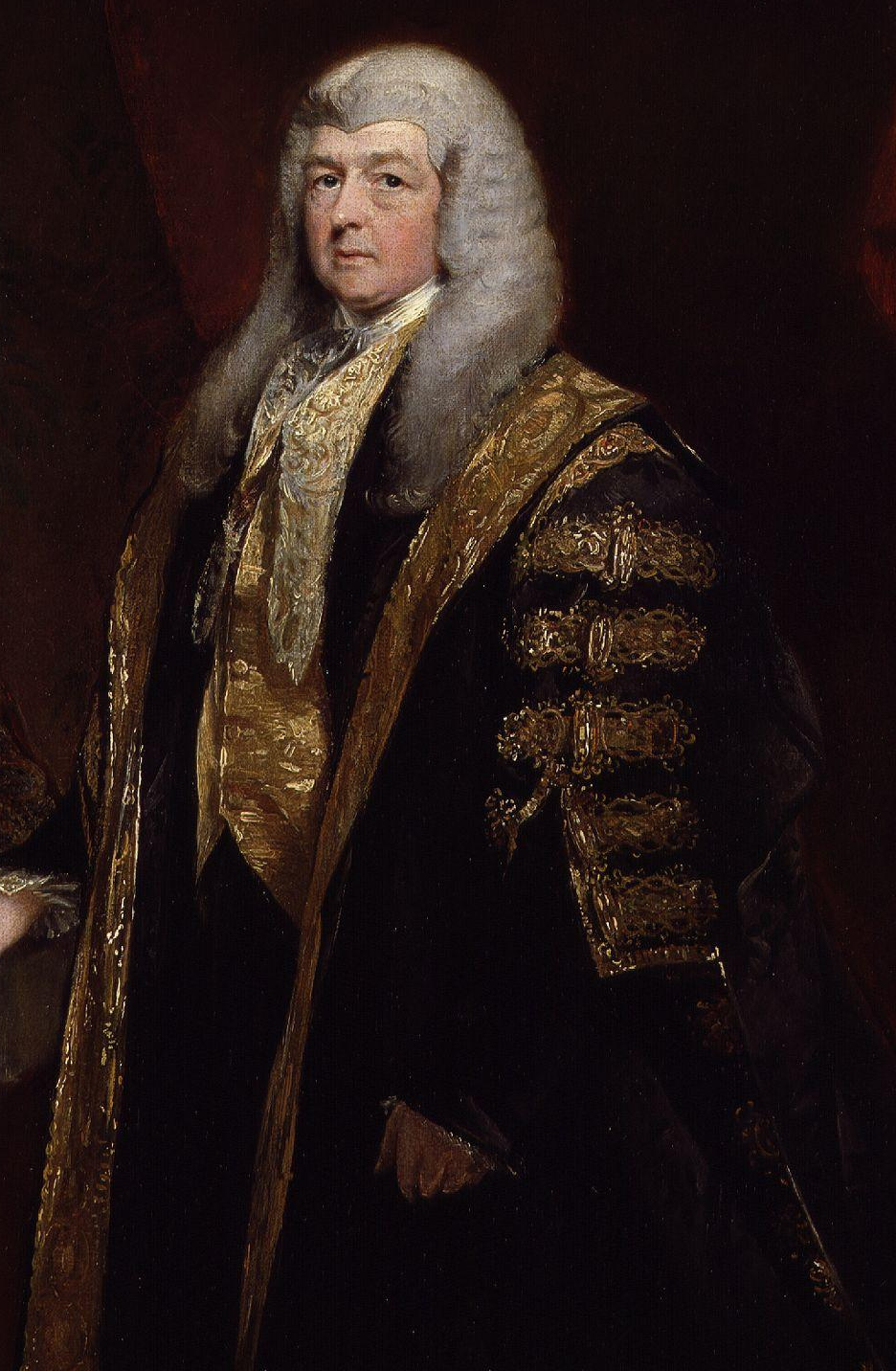
Lord

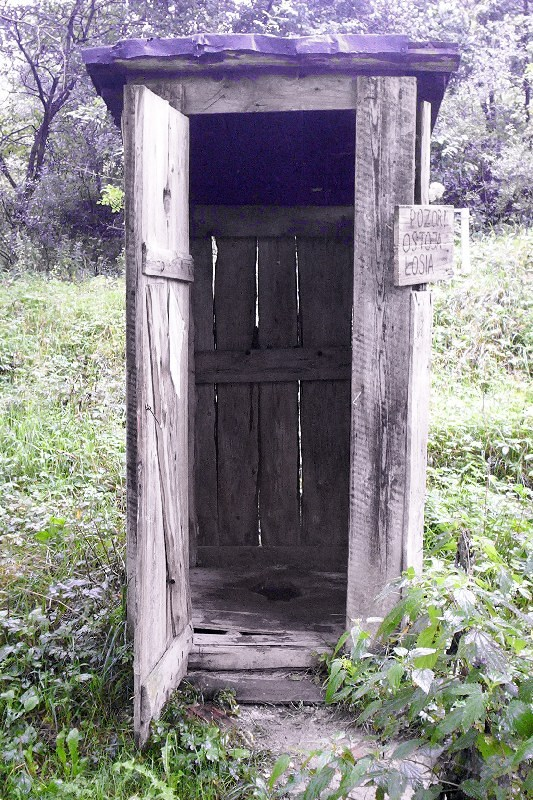
Privy

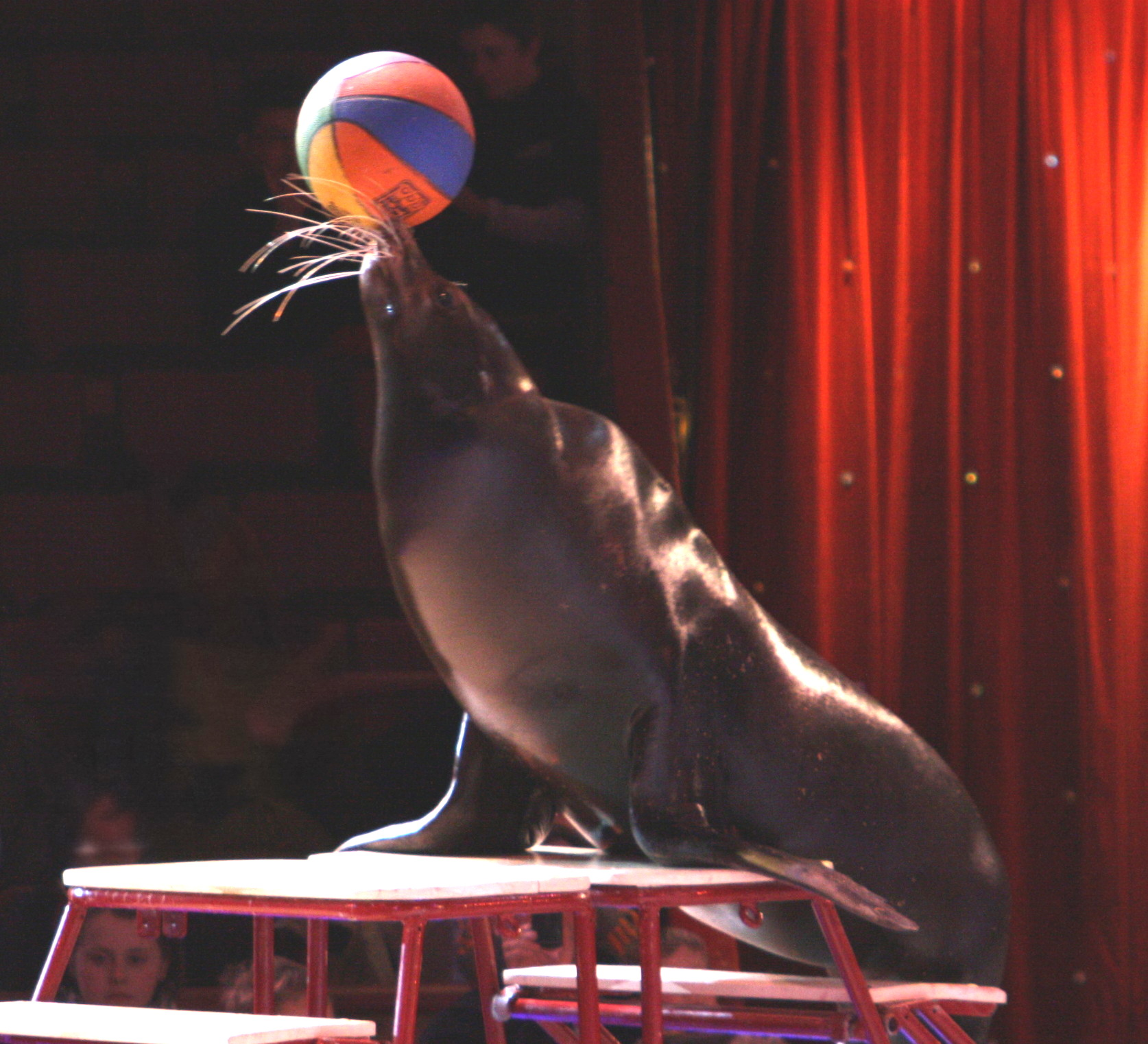
Seal

A sketch in The Frost Report is responsible for the term "Lord Privy Seal" in the British television industry, meaning the practice of matching too literal imagery with every element of the accompanying spoken script. In the sketch, the practice was taken to an extreme by backing a "news report" about the Lord Privy Seal (a senior Cabinet official) with images, in quick succession, of a lord, a privy, and a seal balancing a ball on its nose.
