= Ronnie Corbett =

Scottish comedian and actor (1930–2016)

Ronnie Corbett CBE
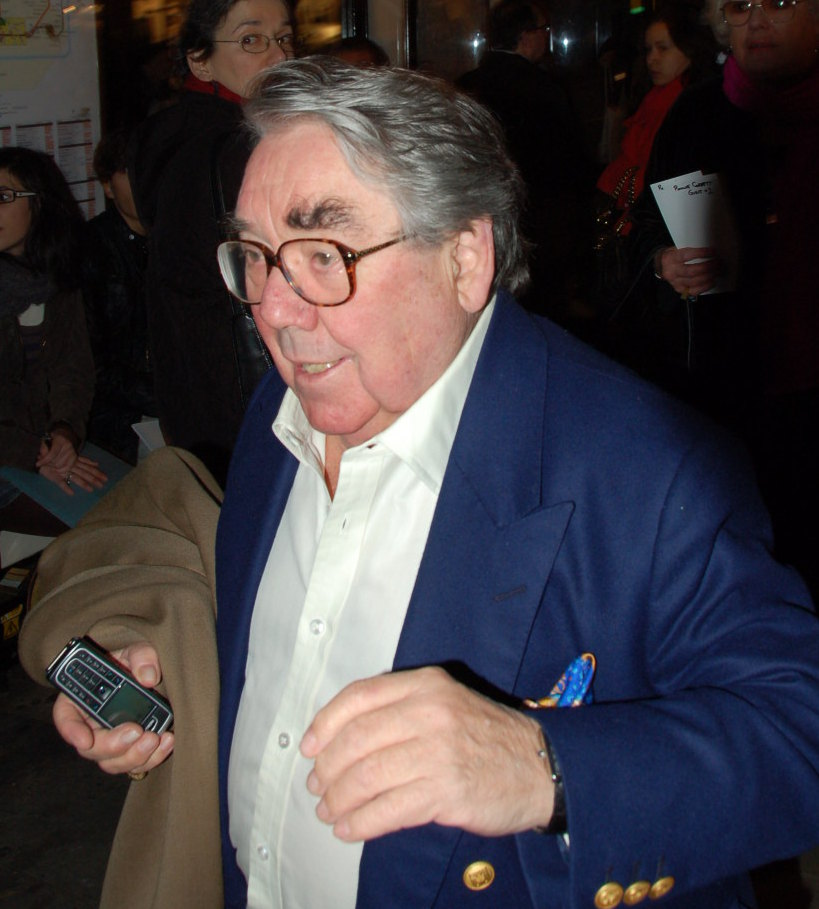
- Corbett in 2010
- Born: Ronald Balfour Corbett; 4 December 1930; Edinburgh, Scotland
- Died: 31 March 2016 (aged 85); Shirley, London, England
- Resting place: Croydon Cemetery, Croydon, London, England
- Occupations: Comedian; actor
- Years active: 1952–2014
- Height: 5 ft 1 in (155 cm)
- Spouse: Anne Hart (m. 1966)
- Children: 3
- Military career
- Branch: Royal Air Force
- Service years: 1950–1953
- Rank: Flying officer
- Unit: Film Unit

Ronald Balfour Corbett (4 December 1930 – 31 March 2016) was a Scottish comedian and actor. He had a long association with Ronnie Barker in the BBC Television comedy sketch show The Two Ronnies (1971–87), becoming known for his meandering chair monologues, and starred in sitcoms such as No – That's Me Over Here! (1967–70), Now Look Here (1971–73), and Sorry! (1981–88).

Corbett began his acting career after moving from Edinburgh to London; he had early roles in the TV series Crackerjack and The Saint. He achieved prominence and began performing with Ronnie Barker in David Frost's satirical comedy programme The Frost Report (1966–67), and appeared in the films You're Only Young Twice (1952), Rockets Galore! (1958), Casino Royale (1967), Some Will, Some Won't (1970), and No Sex Please, We're British (1973).

== Early life ==
Corbett was born on 4 December 1930 at The Royal Maternity Hospital in Edinburgh, Scotland, the son of William Balfour Corbett (1898–1974), a master baker, and his London-born wife, Annie Elizabeth Corbett (née Main; 1900–1991). He had a brother about six years younger, Allan, and a sister about ten years younger, Margaret. Corbett's grandfather was principal organist at St Andrew’s Church of Scotland in the early 20th century and features in church histories of the time.

Corbett was educated at James Gillespie's Boys School and the Royal High School in the city. After leaving school he decided he wanted to be an actor while performing in amateur theatricals at a church youth club. His first job, however, was with the Ministry of Agriculture.

Corbett did his national service with the Royal Air Force, during which he was the shortest commissioned officer in the British Forces. Having enlisted as aircraftman 2nd class Service No 2446942, he received a commission into the secretarial branch of the RAF as a pilot officer (national service) on 25 May 1950. He transferred to the RAF Reserve (National Service List) on 28 October 1951, thereby ending his period of active service. He was promoted to flying officer on 6 September 1952.

== Career ==
Following national service, Corbett moved to London to start his acting career. At 5 ft 1 in (1.55 m) tall, Corbett was suited to playing roles younger than his years. References to his height frequently cropped up in his self-deprecating humour. In one of his earliest stage appearances, he was billed as "Ronald Corbett" at Cromer in Take it Easy in 1956, with Graham Stark. He appeared in Crackerjack as a regular in its early days, one episode with Winifred Atwell. He had a walk-on in an early episode of the 1960s series The Saint (as "Ronald Corbett") and appeared in films including You're Only Young Twice (1952), Rockets Galore! (1957), Casino Royale (1967), Some Will, Some Won't (1970) and the film version of the farce No Sex Please, We're British (1973).

Corbett starred in the first London production of the musical The Boys from Syracuse (as Dromio of Syracuse) in 1963 at the Theatre Royal, Drury Lane, alongside Bob Monkhouse. In 1965 he was in cabaret at Winston's, Danny La Rue's Mayfair nightclub. David Frost saw him and asked him to appear in The Frost Report. Corbett was in the West End, playing Will Scarlett in Lionel Bart's Robin Hood musical Twang!!. It failed, leaving Corbett free to accept. It was while working at Danny La Rue's nightclub that Corbett met Anne Hart, whom he was to marry that year. The marriage lasted 49 years, until his death.

=== Appearing in pantomime in Glasgow ===
In 1966, Corbett appeared in "Cinderella" as one of the "Ugly sisters"; the other being played by Stanley Baxter. Also in the pantomime was Lonnie Donegan, who played "Buttons". According to "The Stage", this was Corbett's first lead role on the Scottish stage.

=== With David Frost ===
Corbett first worked with Ronnie Barker in The Frost Report (1966–67). The writers and cast were mostly Oxbridge graduates from the Footlights tradition. Corbett said he and Barker were drawn together as two grammar school or state secondary school boys, who had not gone to university. The show was a mixture of satirical monologues, sketches and music. Corbett and Barker were beginning to be thought of as a pair.

They appeared with John Cleese in one of the most repeated comedy sketches in British television: the Class sketch. Corbett's height provided a key cue for both the visual humour and satirical value of the sketch, as he "looked up" to both Cleese and Barker's characters, and he got the pay-off line: "I get a pain in the back of my neck."

Continuing under Frost, Corbett starred in No – That's Me Over Here!, a sitcom written by Frost Report writers Barry Cryer, Graham Chapman and Eric Idle (ITV 1967–70). Cryer and Chapman wrote two follow-ups: Now Look Here (BBC 1971–73) and The Prince of Denmark (BBC 1974). Corbett also appeared in Frost on Sunday (ITV 1968) and hosted The Corbett Follies (ITV 1969). Frost was also the promoter of Corbett's 1970 novelty single "It's All Going Up Up Up", a satire on inflation. In 1974 Corbett released another single Fanny, written by Roger Cook and Herbie Flowers on the Decca label. He performed the song on an edition of Top of the Pops broadcast November 14, but it failed to reach the UK singles chart.

Corbett was a subject of the television programme This Is Your Life in April 1970 when he was surprised by Eamonn Andrews while appearing on the Frost on Sunday programme.

=== The Two Ronnies ===
Corbett's BBC television comedy show with Ronnie Barker, The Two Ronnies, ran from 1971 to 1987. Barker and Corbett performed sketches and musical numbers. Corbett presented a monologue. Sitting in a large easy chair (emphasising his small size), and usually wearing a Lyle & Scott golfing V-neck sweater, he would stretch telling a simple joke over several minutes, often allowing himself to appear to lose his train of thought.

=== Later work ===
Corbett's best-known role away from The Two Ronnies was as the 40-something Timothy Lumsden, dominated by his mother, in the sitcom Sorry! (1981–88). In 1996, he appeared on the première of the short-lived BBC game show Full Swing, hosted by Jimmy Tarbuck. Corbett played Reggie Sea Lions in the film Fierce Creatures (1997), written by his former Frost Report colleague John Cleese.

Corbett hosted the game show Small Talk and played minor parts occasionally since its end – such as Griselda in a television production of Cinderella in 2000, and reviving his armchair monologue routines for a weekly appearance in a stand-up show hosted by Ben Elton. In 2003, he appeared in advertisements for the Sky+ digital television service alongside Alice Cooper. The premise was a running gag about their being happy housemates. In December 2004, Corbett appeared on the BBC news quiz Have I Got News for You.

In 2005, Corbett teamed up again with Ronnie Barker for The Two Ronnies Sketchbook, comedy sketches from their original series with newly recorded linking material. Also in March 2005, Corbett appeared with comedian Peter Kay in the music video for the number one single "Is This the Way to Amarillo?" to raise money for Comic Relief. Corbett is remembered for accidentally falling on the treadmill that was out of shot in the green screen video; however, he found the fall funny when played back, and it was kept in the final version. He performed in Children's Party at the Palace as Mr Tibbs, the Queen's butler.

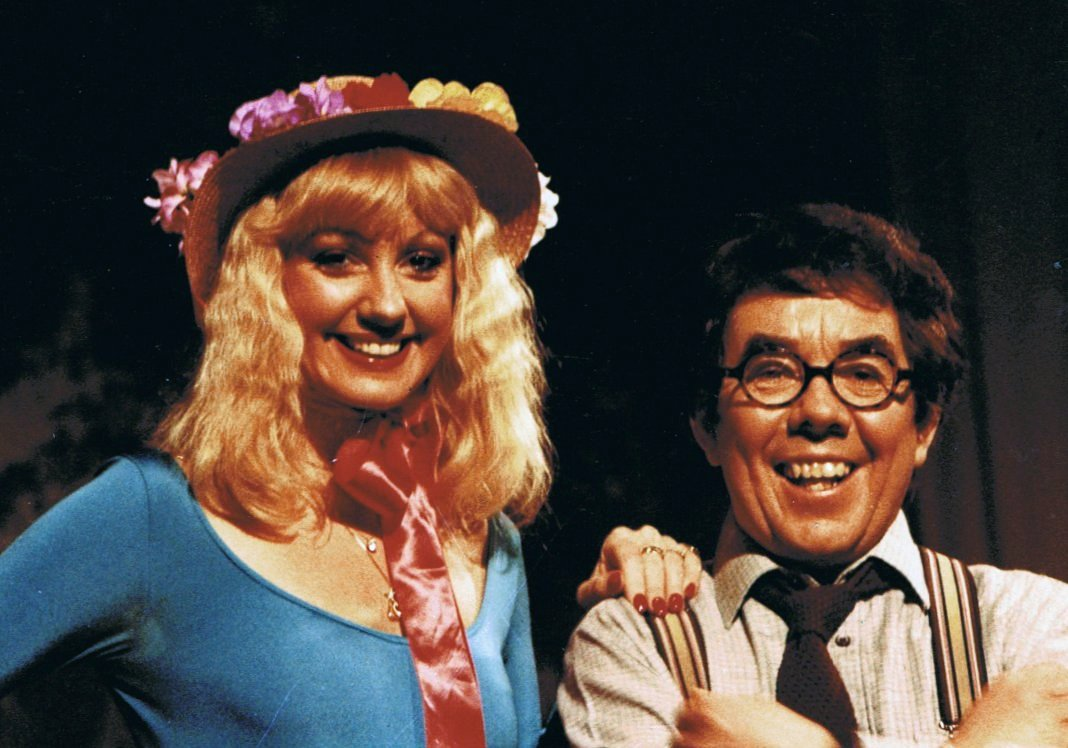
Corbett and Susie Silvey on the set of Sorry!, 1980s

In 2006, Corbett played a hyper-realised version of himself in Extras, caught taking drugs at the BAFTA Awards. He also starred as himself in Little Britain Abroad, in which Bubbles DeVere tried successfully to seduce him. He opened the centre in Cromer, Norfolk, named after Henry Blogg. Corbett was the castaway in the BBC Radio 4 show Desert Island Discs on 21 October 2007. In 2007, he appeared in an episode of Gordon Ramsay's The F Word. He featured as a Slitheen in a Sarah Jane Adventures episode for Red Nose Day 2009. He had a television interview about his life on 7 November 2009 for Piers Morgan's Life Stories.

In February 2010, Corbett was in the John Landis thriller comedy Burke & Hare. In August 2010 he was a panellist in the BBC 1 comedy show Would I Lie to You?. In the same month, he was the star of the Good Food HD programme Ronnie Corbett's Supper Club with Rob Brydon and Steve Speirs. The show's premise was that the main guest of the programme must choose a meal as if it were their last, and Corbett would cook it for him/her and his other guest, while they chatted about the guest's past and their current/future projects. In December of the same year he starred in a one-off special, The One Ronnie.

From 2010, Corbett starred in the BBC Radio 4 sitcom When The Dog Dies. The series reunited him with Ian Davidson and Peter Vincent, the writers of Sorry! The series returned to BBC Radio Four for another three series.

== Award and honours ==
Already an Officer of the Order of the British Empire (OBE), Corbett was promoted to Commander of the Order of the British Empire (CBE) in the 2012 New Year Honours for services to entertainment and charity. In 2002 the Queen Margaret University College in Edinburgh awarded him an honorary degree.

== Personal life ==
On 30 May 1966, Corbett married Anne Hart, an actress and dancer; they had two daughters, both of whom became actresses. Their first child, a son, had a heart defect and died when he was 6 weeks old at St Thomas' Hospital, in London. Corbett lived in Addington, London from 1970 to 2003. He also had a Scottish home in Gullane, East Lothian, and often spoke of wanting to become a beekeeper but never got round to it. Corbett's daughter Emma went into stand-up comedy in the 2020s, appearing first in "Fringe by the Sea" and then in the Edinburgh Fringe Festival. Corbett was a golfer and appeared in celebrity and pro–am events; in 2009 he made a documentary with Colin Montgomerie in which they played at Gleneagles. A keen cricket fan, Corbett was also a president of the cricketing charity the Lord's Taverners (1982 and 1987). He supported his local football club, Crystal Palace FC, as well as his home club, Heart of Midlothian FC. In mid-2014 Corbett attended a party at 10 Downing Street hosted by the Conservative Prime Minister, David Cameron. In August 2014 Corbett was one of 200 public figures who were signatories to a letter to The Guardian expressing their hope that Scotland would vote to remain part of the United Kingdom in September's referendum.

== Death ==
On 31 March 2016 Corbett died, aged 85, at Shirley Oaks Hospital in Shirley, London, surrounded by his family. He had been diagnosed with motor neurone disease in March 2015. John Cleese said that Corbett had "the best timing" he had ever watched. Bruce Forsyth said Corbett's death marked "one of the saddest days of my life".Corbett's funeral service, for family and friends, was held on 18 April 2016 at the St John the Evangelist Church near his home in Shirley. In tribute to one of his classic Two Ronnies comedy sketches, four candles were displayed at the back of the altar. His body was cremated following a private service at Croydon Crematorium. Mourners included Michael Parkinson, Rob Brydon and Jimmy Tarbuck. Barry Cryer, who worked with and had first met Corbett 50 years before, said, "I can't think of him without smiling... I'm here and tipping my hat to him." A memorial service for Corbett was held in Westminster Abbey on 7 June 2017. His widow, Anne Hart, died on 5 November 2023 in Scotland, aged 90.

== Filmography ==
=== Film ===
Year	Title	Role	Notes
1952	You're Only Young Twice	Student	
1953	Top of the Form	Student	Uncredited
1954	The Million Pound Note	Photographer	Uncredited
1956	Fun at St. Fanny's	Chumleigh	
1957	After the Ball	Stage Entertainer	Uncredited
1957	Rockets Galore!	Drooby	
1962	Operation Snatch	Soldier	Uncredited
1967	Casino Royale	Polo	
1967	Monsieur Lecoq		
1970	Some Will, Some Won't	Herbert Russell	
1970	The Rise and Rise of Michael Rimmer	Interviewer	
1973	No Sex Please, We're British	Brian Runnicles	
1997	Fierce Creatures	Reggie Sea Lions	
1999	The Comedy Trail: A Shaggy Dog Story	Himself	
2010	Burke and Hare	Captain Tam McLintoch	

=== Television ===
Year	Title	Role	Channel	Notes	
1953	Douglas Fairbanks Presents	Young Hooligan	NBC	Episode: "A Pricecless Pocket"	
1955	The Vise	Chap	ABC	Episode: "The Final Column"	
1957	Sheep's Clothing	Valet	BBC Television Service	7 episodes	
1957–1960	Crackerjack!	Himself	BBC Television Service	40 episodes	
1963	The Saint	Call Boy "Nicki"	ITV	Episode: "The King of the Beggars"	
1966–1967	The Frost Report	Various roles	BBC One	28 episodes	
1967–1970	No – That's Me Over Here!	Ronnie	ITV	25 episodes	
1967	At Last the 1948 Show	Saudi Wrestling Stagehand	ITV	1 episode	
1969	Hark at Barker	Announcer/Lord Rustless/Others	ITV	15 episodes	
1970	Frost on Sunday	Himself	ITV	10 episodes	
1970	Jackanory	Storyteller	BBC One	Story: "Hullabaloo"	
1970–1994	This Is Your Life	Himself	ITV	3 episodes	
1971–1973	Now Look Here	Ronnie	BBC One	14 episodes	
1971–1987	The Two Ronnies	Himself & various characters	BBC One	93 episodes	
1971–1994	Christmas Night with the Stars	Host	BBC One	3 episodes	
1974	The Prince of Denmark	Ronnie	BBC One	6 episodes	
1975–1977	Seaside Special	Himself	BBC One	2 episodes	
1981–1988	Sorry!	Timothy Lumsden	BBC One	42 episodes	
1991–1998	Noel's House Party	Timothy Lumsden	BBC One	The Butler	17 episodes
1994–1996	Small Talk	Host	BBC One	52 episodes	
1998–2000	Timbuctoo	Narrator & all characters except Giant Squeak	BBC One	CITV	26 episodes
1998	The Ben Elton Show	Himself	BBC One	8 episodes	
2000	Cinderella ITV Panto	Griselda (one of the Ugly Sisters)	ITV	TV special	
2004	The Keith Barret Show	Himself with his wife	BBC Two	1 episode	
2004	Monkey Trousers	Various roles	ITV	TV movie	
2005	The Scottish Golf Show	Himself	STV	1 episode	
2005	The Two Ronnies Sketchbook	Himself	BBC One	7 episodes	
2006	Extras	Himself	BBC Two	Episode: "Chris Martin"	
2006	Little Britain Abroad	Himself	BBC One	2 episodes	
2006–2009	The New Paul O'Grady Show	Guest	Channel 4	4 episodes	
2007	Franny's Feet	Additional Voices	Family Channel	64 episodes	
2008	Love Soup	Gordon Baxter	BBC One	Episode: "Kiss of Death"	
2008–2010	The One Show	Guest	BBC One	2 episodes	
2009	The Sarah Jane Adventures	Ambassador "Rani" Ranius/Slitheen	CBBC	Children in Need Special: "From Raxacoricofallapatorius with Love"	
2009	Strictly Come Dancing	Co-host	BBC One	1 episode	
2009–2012	Piers Morgan's Life Stories	Himself	ITV	3 episodes	
2009–2014	The Graham Norton Show	Guest	BBC One	3 episodes	
2010	Ant & Dec's Push the Button	Himself	ITV	6 episodes	
2010	Something for the Weekend	Timothy	BBC Two	1 episode	
2010	The One Ronnie	Himself	BBC One	One-off programme	
2010	Would I Lie to You?	Guest	BBC One	1 episode	
2010	Ronnie Corbett's Supper Club	Presenter	Good Food	1 episode	
2010	The Rob Brydon Show	Guest	BBC Two	1 episode	
2010	Loose Women	Guest	ITV	1 episode	
2011	Ronnie Corbett's Comedy Britain	Himself	ITV	Documentary	
2013	Ronnie's Animal Crackers	Presenter	BBC One	6 episodes	
