= Who Let the Dogs Out (disambiguation) =

"Who Let the Dogs Out" is a song released by Baha Men in 2000.

Who Let the Dogs Out may also refer to:

- Who Let the Dogs Out (Baha Men album), Baha Men album with the titular song
- Who Let the Dogs Out (Lambrini Girls album), 2025 album
- Who Let the Dogs Out? (TV series), a British children's show
