= Rik Carey =

Bahamian music producer and musician

- Born: Patrick Andre Carey Jr. The Bahamas
- Origin: Nassau, The Bahamas
- Genres: Bahamian music, pop
- Occupations: Musician, songwriter, producer
- Years active: 1999–present
- Member of: Baha Men

Patrick "Rik" Carey is a Bahamian music producer, singer, musician and the lead vocalist for the junkanoo band Baha Men, with the hit song "Who Let the Dogs Out".

== Awards and nominations ==
- Grammy Award as lead vocalist of Baha Men for the album Who Let the Dogs Out for Best Dance Recording
- Billboard Awards for World Music Album of the Year
- Billboard Awards for World Music Song of the Year
- Nickelodeon Kids' Choice Awards for Favorite Band

== Discography ==
- 2000 – Baha Men – Who Let the Dogs Out

== See also ==
- Baha Men

== Sources ==
- http://www.myspace.com/rikcareybahamen
