= Who Let the Dogs Out (Lambrini Girls album) =

Studio album by Lambrini Girls
- Released: 10 January 2025
- Recorded: April 2024
- Studio: Echo Zoo (Eastbourne)
- Genres: Punk rock; post-punk
- Length: 29:25
- Label: City Slang
- Producers: Daniel Fox; Lambrini Girls

Lambrini Girls chronology
You're Welcome (2023)	Who Let the Dogs Out (2025)	No Refunds (2027)

Singles from Who Let the Dogs Out
- 1. "Company Culture" Released: September 2024; 2. "Big Dick Energy" Released: October 2024; 3. "Love" Released: November 2024

Who Let the Dogs Out is the debut studio album by British punk rock band Lambrini Girls, released on 10 January 2025 by City Slang Records. The album was written and recorded in April 2024 during breaks in their tour and was preceded by the singles "Company Culture", "Big Dick Energy", and "Love". Who Let the Dogs Out comprised ten tracks about social issues and then "Cuntology 101", for which a video was released. The album received widespread acclaim from critics and charted at No. 16 on the UK Albums Chart.

== Background and recording ==
Having released their EP You're Welcome in 2023, Lambrini Girls became known for abrasive punk songs about social issues such as misogyny, transphobia, and homophobia. They had a reputation for actioning their beliefs, having threatened to "scrap any TERFs any day, in person, with my fists" in 2023 and having pulled out of The Great Escape Festival in 2024 over the band's pro-Palestine stance. They had also had to contend with the departure of the band's vocalist Flora Kimberly, bassist Fox Foxington Fox, and drummer Catt Jack, leaving them with just Phoebe Lunny and Selin Macieira-Boşgelmez (then known as Lilly).

Lambrini Girls wrote their debut album, Who Let the Dogs Out, in Oxford in April 2024 during two bursts over ten days during breaks in their tour. The first half of their sessions followed a strict structure of waking up, going for a run, making breakfast, and then writing from about midday to around 7 or 8pm, but they found this too regimented, so for the second half, they ordered in massive amounts of alcohol and took breaks at will. The album was then recorded with Daniel Fox of Gilla Band, who the band had previously supported on tour and who had produced their single "God's Country", and mixed by Seth Manchester, who had produced works by Mdou Moctar, Battles, and Model/Actriz.

== Promotion and release ==
In September 2024, they released "Company Culture", a sarcastic track written about toxic workplace environments. By the following month, they had signed to City Slang; that month, they announced Who Let the Dogs Out and released "Big Dick Energy", a track about toxic masculinity accompanied by a lyric video containing the Urban Dictionary definition of the phrase "big dick energy", messages they had received on Hinge, and shots of the band performing. In the album announcement of Who Let the Dogs Out, the band mooted the idea of dedicating the album to "all the booze we bought at Tesco". The month after that, they released "Love", a track about toxic relationships.

They released Who Let the Dogs Out on 10 January 2025; the album took its name from an inside joke involving the song of that name by Baha Men. The album includes many diatribes about social issues; "Bad Apple" and "Nothing Tastes As Good As It Feels" rail against police brutality and diet culture, while "You're Not from Around Here", "No Homo", and "Filthy Rich Nepo Baby" address gentrification, homophobia, and nepotism and "Special Different" is about neurodiversity. The album contains one interlude, "Scarcity is Fake (Communist Propaganda)", which comprises a speech by Stokely Carmichael. In an interview with the Official Charts Company shortly after release, the band described the album as "a party for pissed off, gay, angry sluts".

They promoted the album with a music video for closing track "Cuntology 101" posted shortly after the album's release. The song contained 40 uses of "cunt", a word described by Emily Reily of Treble as "a historically toxic label aimed at women", including a "C-U-N-T" cheerleading chant. The song also describes many things as "cunty" such as "learning how to let go", "sensing boundaries", "respecting others", "having cum on my shirt", "having an autistic meltdown", "shagging behind some bins", "doing a poo at your friend’s house", and "stealing shit from chain stores". Lunny wrote the song as a palate cleanser, as she wanted to write something celebrating herself, and as an exercise in relating as many trivial matters to self-love as she could. The song's title took its name from a phrase she found amusing: "Yeah, that's "Cuntology 101", bitch!". For the song's recording, Macieira attempted to teach herself FL Studio, but found learning the program in a day overambitious and ended up writing using the studio's Behringer Model Ds.

The band released a video for "No Homo" in February and a Peaches remix of "Cuntology 101" in September. In November, the band released a limited edition vinyl edition of the album titled Slutcore Version For Kids Who Can't Read Good, a reference to Zoolander. The version had a cover designed by David Shrigley and ran for 3,000 copies.

== Reception ==
Professional ratings
Aggregate scores
Source	Rating
Metacritic	83/100
Review scores
Source	Rating
AllMusic	4/5 stars
Clash	9/10
DIY	4.5 stars
The Guardian	4/5 stars
Kerrang!	4/5
NME	5/5 stars
Pitchfork	7.3/10
Rolling Stone	4/5 stars
The Skinny	4/5 stars
Sputnikmusic	2.5/5

Who Let the Dogs Out received widespread acclaim from critics. According to review aggregator Metacritic, the album holds a score of 83 out of 100 based on 17 critic reviews, indicating "universal acclaim". The album received positive reviews from Alexis Petridis, Robert Christgau, the Financial Times, When the Horn Blows, Pitchfork, The Soundboard Reviews, Beats Per Minute, DIY, The Arts Desk, Kerrang!, Clash, Rolling Stone, Dork, NME, AllMusic, Narc, Classic Rock, Louder, The Skinny, KFJC, and MusicOMH, though Sputnikmusic gave it a negative review. Initially forecast to chart at No. 3 on the UK Albums Chart, the album instead made that week's listing at No. 16, and made No. 2 in the Independent Albums Chart and No. 1 in the Rock & Metal Chart. The album subsequently appeared at No. 15 on Rough Trade's Albums of the Year list and won the HERcury Prize.

== Track listing ==
All tracks are written by Phoebe Lunny, Lilly Macieira-Bosgelmez and Jack Looker, except "Big Dick Energy", written by Phoebe Lunny and Catt Jack.

No.	Title	Length
1.	"Bad Apple"	2:32
2.	"Company Culture"	3:02
3.	"Big Dick Energy"	4:16
4.	"No Homo"	2:27
5.	"Nothing Tastes As Good As It Feels"	2:56
6.	"You're Not from Around Here"	2:23
7.	"Scarcity is Fake (Communist Propaganda)"	0:17
8.	"Filthy Rich Nepo Baby"	2:34
9.	"Special Different"	2:55
10.	"Love"	3:40
11.	"Cuntology 101"	2:18
Total length:		29:25

== Personnel ==
Credits adapted from the album's liner notes and Tidal.

=== Lambrini Girls ===
- Phoebe Lunny – lead vocals, guitar, production
- Lilly Macieira-Bosgelmez – bass, backing vocals, production

=== Additional contributors ===
- Jack Looker – drums
- Daniel Fox – production, recording
- Seth Manchester – mixing
- Joe LaPorta – mastering
- Derek Perlman – photography
- John Gottfried – photography
- Doreen Becker – layout

== Charts ==
Chart performance for Who Let the Dogs Out
Chart (2025)	Peak position
Belgian Albums (Ultratop Flanders)	175
French Physical Albums (SNEP)	69
French Rock & Metal Albums (SNEP)	16
Scottish Albums (Official Charts)	3
UK Albums (Official Charts)	16
UK Independent Albums (Official Charts)	2
UK Rock & Metal Albums (Official Charts)	1
