= Anslem Douglas =

Trinidad and Tobago musician

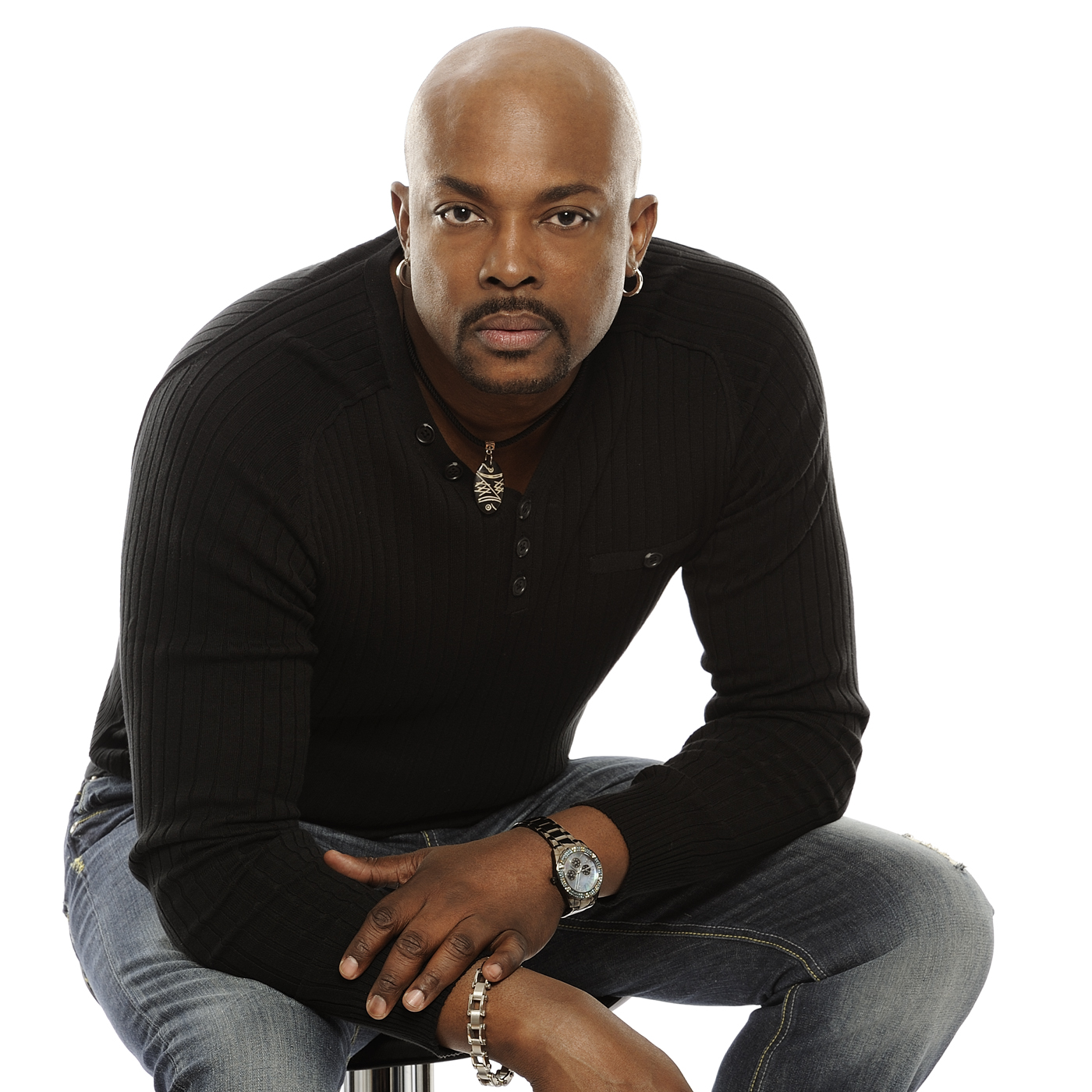
- Douglas in 2010
- Born: 23 July 1964 (age 62); La Romaine, Trinidad
- Occupations: Musician, composer
- Years active: 1980–present
- Notable work: "Doggie" (which was later covered by the Baha Men as "Who Let the Dogs Out")

Anslem Douglas (born 23 July 1964) is a Trinidadian musician and composer. He is best known for the hit single "Doggie", which was later covered by the Bahamian junkanoo band Baha Men as "Who Let the Dogs Out".

== Biography ==
Douglas was born and raised in the village of La Romaine in the southern part of Trinidad. Douglas started singing at his local Pentecostal Church and, at age 16, along with a few of his friends in the church, formed a band called Exodus. In 1984, Douglas enlisted in the Trinidad and Tobago Coast Guard where he served for a period of six years. During this time, he performed with the Coast Guard band.

Douglas later, after he was introduced to Trinidad's native genre, soca, performed with some local bands out of Trinidad such as Fire Flight (with whom he recorded his first song in 1988) and Atlantik. During this time he composed Ragga Poom Poom, Good Music To Dance, and the hit single Who Let the Dogs Out? which went on to win a Grammy in 2001, although the most well-known version of the song outside the Caribbean is the cover version of the song sung by the Baha Men. Douglas also wrote Friend on the Soul Island album and Ooh Ahh, the smooth jazz hit produced by Eddie Bullen and written by Douglas on the same record, to the social outrage of Abuse featured on his Sir Anslem Douglas album released in 2000.

In 2001 Douglas was sued with regards to full authorship of the song Who Let the Dogs Out? The chorus was originally composed in 1995 by Patrick Stephenson and Leroy Williams of Just Platinum Recording Studios/Action House Studios in Toronto, Ontario, Canada for a radio jingle. The lawsuit showed that Douglas was a client of the studio during that time, and that he used the chorus to compose the song. The lawsuit was settled for an undisclosed sum.

Douglas recorded a ten track Neo soul/Pop album entitled Project A.D. with most of the songs self-written, which were produced by Eddie Bullen and his son Quincy Bullen. It was released in the spring of 2012. In 2013 he released a single called Do You Think He Will Understand, a power Soca called Bacchanal, and a neo-Calypso single, Dancing With You. Anslem also recorded a Classic 60s riddim with Lil Bitts called I Want To Know. For Carnival 2014 Anslem released the power Soca singles Boom and Broughtupcy, followed by a smooth Reggae track, It Wasn't You at the end of April. Douglas won Best Caribbean Style Artist at the 2014 Black Canadian Awards.

== Selected discography ==
- Soul Island (3 January 2012)
- Project A.D. (December 2012)
- Bacchanal (single – 1 January 2013)
- Dancing With You (single – 14 March 2013)
- When You Wine (single – 16 May 2013)
- Boom Boom (single – 21 December 2013)
- Broughtupcy (single – 13 January 2014)
- It Wasn't You (single – 30 April 2014)
