= Big dick energy =

Slang phrase

Big dick energy (BDE) is a slang phrase that originated in 2018, denoting an easy confidence.

== Meaning ==
The phrase big dick energy denotes an easy confidence or a sense of assurance and purpose. In general, having big dick energy is unrelated to whether or not someone actually has a large penis or any penis at all. The term can be used for any gender.

== History ==
There are conflicting accounts of how the term originated, although both put the origin within a two-week timeframe in 2018.

The term first entered popular culture after being used in 2018 on Twitter to describe Pete Davidson, then in a relationship with Ariana Grande. Replying to Grande, a Twitter user tweeted that "Pete Davidson is 6'3 [1.91 m] with dark circles, exudes big dick energy, looks evil but apparently is an angel, and loves his girl publicly." The phrase was immediately picked up by the community.

Following the popularization of the term relating to Davidson, another Twitter user took credit for coining the phrase, pointing to a comment they had made two weeks beforehand mourning the death of Anthony Bourdain.

In 2021, the rapper Latto released her single "Big Energy", which referenced the meme. Latto told Billboard that in the lyrics she took the "masculine, trendy 'big dick energy' quote" from social media and made it a concept that all genders can have and take it deeper than just a sexual aspect." Latto added, "I wanted it to be empowering. It's an aura that you carry and a confidence. It's just an overall vibe and when you walk in the room, you have 'big energy' and no one can tell you otherwise." Her A&R representatives first played her the beat during a studio session in Los Angeles, which she felt keen on but perceived it as musically different and "out of [her] comfort zone". Latto described the writing process as a dynamic collaborative effort, collecting different opinions with "people in the room [to] bounce ideas off of each other... talking out loud, playing the beat out loud. It wasn't a sit-down-and-write type of thing... and I was asking the girls in the room, 'What does big energy mean to you?'"

In 2025, Lambrini Girls released the song "Big Dick Energy" on their debut album Who Let the Dogs Out.

=== Small dick energy ===
Avatar of Greta Thunberg

Greta Thunberg
Twitter
@GretaThunberg

yes, please do enlighten me. email me at smalldickenergy@getalife.com

December 28, 2022

Avatar of Andrew Tate

Andrew Tate
Twitter
@Cobratate

Hello @GretaThunberg

I have 33 cars.

My Bugatti has a w16 8.0L quad turbo.

My TWO Ferrari 812 competizione have 6.5L v12s.

This is just the start.

Please provide your email address so I can send a complete list of my car collection and their respective enormous emissions.

December 27, 2022

In December 2022, Andrew Tate addressed the environmentalist Greta Thunberg in a tweet extolling his carbon-emitting automobiles and asked for her email address to give her more information. Thunberg replied with the fake, satirical email address "smalldickenergy@getalife.com". The exchange received substantial attention on Twitter, with Thunberg's retort quickly becoming one of the most-liked tweets ever.
