= Move It Like This (song) =

Single by Baha Men

from the album Move It Like This
- B-side: "Remixes"
- Released: 17 February 2002
- Genre: Dance-pop, reggae, junkanoo
- Length: 3:24
- Label: S-Curve; Capitol; EMI
- Songwriters: Anthony Monks Flowers, Brooke Morrow, Colyn Grant, David Schommer, Herschel Small, Jeffrey Chea, Marvin Prosper, Rick Carey, Sam Hollander, Steve Greenberg

Baha Men singles chronology
"Best Years of Our Lives" (2001)	"Move It Like This" (2002)	"We Rubbin'" (2002)

"Move It Like This" is a song recorded by the Bahamian pop group Baha Men. It was released on 17 February 2002 as the second and title single from the seventh album of the same name. The song reached number 13 on the New Zealand RIANZ list, number 13 on the Canadian Singles Chart and number 65 on the Swiss Music Charts.

== Composition ==
"Move It Like This" is a junkanoo and dance-pop song with reggae influences. According to the sheet music published by Sony/ATV on Musicnotes.com, the song is set in the key of E Major in common time with a moderate tempo of 130 beats per minute. The song follows a chord sequence of E-A-B-A for most of the song.The vocals range from B_{2}-B♭_{5}.

== Critical reception ==
The song received generally mixed reviews. musicOMH said of it, "Try to remember this song and you'll remember...nothing original." Conversely, Scott Tady of the Beaver County Times called the song "jubilant" and Rebecca Mahoney of the Lakeland Ledger referred to it as "energetic".

== Music video ==
Directed by Bryan Barber, the video starts with the Baha Men's tour bus arriving at a college fraternity house filled with high-class students. The Baha Men tell them that they're here for 'the party' with the students protesting no party until the band forces themselves in to set up with a bunch of people coming up behind them hearing about the party. The party escalates from being a house party to going outside during the night with the police coming in to stop the party only for them to get sucked in by the music. Throughout the video, the partygoers perform dance moves that the Baha Men mention in the song from the twist, the electric slide and the robot.

== Popular culture ==
The song was in the soundtrack of the 2002 comedy film Big Fat Liar, starring Frankie Muniz, Amanda Bynes and Paul Giamatti. It was also featured in the 2003 video game Dead or Alive Xtreme Beach Volleyball as well as in an NBA commercial. It was used in a promo for Nick Jr. that aired during the world premiere of the Blue's Clues special, "Meet Joe". It had kids and animated characters from Maggie and the Ferocious Beast, Dora the Explorer, Bob the Builder, Franklin, Little Bear, Little Bill, and Oswald dancing to the song. The song was played at KidZania Manila for the Birthday of Urbano on April 23, 2016 and at the Jansen Household on January 6, 2018. It was also used at the 2002 Kids' Choice Awards.

== Charts ==
=== Weekly charts ===
Weekly chart performance for "Move It Like This"
Chart (2002)	Peak position
Australia (ARIA)	76
Belgium (Ultratip Bubbling Under Flanders)	9
Canada (Nielsen SoundScan)	13
Germany (GfK)	76
Ireland (IRMA)	47
New Zealand (Recorded Music NZ)	11
Scotland (OCC)	17
Switzerland (Schweizer Hitparade)	65
UK Singles (OCC)	16

=== Year-end charts ===
2002 year-end chart performance for "Move It Like This"
Chart	Position
Canada (Nielsen SoundScan)	161
