= Independent Albums =

Billboard record chart

The Independent Albums chart (previously titled Top Independent Albums) ranks the highest-selling independent music albums and extended plays (EPs) in the United States, as compiled by Nielsen SoundScan and published weekly by Billboard magazine. It is used to list artists who are not signed to major labels. Rankings are compiled by point-of-purchase sales obtained by Nielsen, and from legal music downloads from a variety of online music stores. The chart began in the week of February 5, 2000.

The top 25 positions are published through the Billboard website, with further chart positions available through a paid subscription to Billboard.biz. As with all Billboard charts, albums appearing on the Independent chart may also concurrently appear on the Billboard 200, the main chart published based solely on sales, as well as any of the other Billboard charts. In addition, exclusive album titles which are only sold through individual retail sites may also be included in the chart, following a revised chart policy announced on November 7, 2007.

The chart's first number one was Who Let the Dogs Out by Baha Men, which went on to top the year-end chart for 2001.

== Best-selling top independent albums by year ==
Since 2002, Billboard.biz has annually published an end-of-year list of the top 50 best selling independent albums. Billboard also independently announced the highest selling album for 2001. Jason Aldean has topped this chart five times since its inception, twice with his 2009 album Wide Open.

- 2001 (see 2001 in music): Baha Men - Who Let the Dogs Out
- 2002 (see 2002 in music): Mannheim Steamroller - Christmas Extraordinaire
- 2003 (see 2003 in music): Lil Jon & the East Side Boyz - Kings of Crunk
- 2004 (see 2004 in music): Lil Jon & the East Side Boyz - Kings of Crunk
- 2005 (see 2005 in music): Lil Jon & the East Side Boyz - Crunk Juice
- 2006 (see 2006 in music): Little Big Town - The Road to Here
- 2007 (see 2007 in music): Various Artists - Hairspray
- 2008 (see 2008 in music): The Eagles - Long Road out of Eden
- 2009 (see 2009 in music): Jason Aldean - Wide Open
- 2010 (see 2010 in music): Jason Aldean - Wide Open
- 2011 (see 2011 in music): Jason Aldean - My Kinda Party
- 2012 (see 2012 in music): Mumford & Sons - Babel
- 2013 (see 2013 in music): Mumford & Sons - Babel
- 2014 (see 2014 in music): Garth Brooks - Blame It All on My Roots: Five Decades of Influences
- 2015 (see 2015 in music): Jason Aldean - Old Boots, New Dirt
- 2016 (see 2016 in music): Radiohead - A Moon Shaped Pool
- 2017 (see 2017 in music): Metallica - Hardwired... to Self-Destruct
- 2018 (see 2018 in music): Jason Aldean - Rearview Town
- 2019 (see 2019 in music): BTS - Map of the Soul: Persona
- 2020 (see 2020 in music): Bad Bunny – YHLQMDLG
- 2021 (see 2021 in music): Bad Bunny – El Último Tour Del Mundo
- 2022 (see 2022 in music): Bad Bunny – Un Verano Sin Ti
- 2023 (see 2023 in music): Bad Bunny – Un Verano Sin Ti
- 2024 (see 2024 in music): Bad Bunny – Nadie Sabe Lo Que Va a Pasar Mañana
- 2025 (see 2025 in music): Bad Bunny – Debí Tirar Más Fotos
