= Lambrini Girls =

UK music group from Brighton

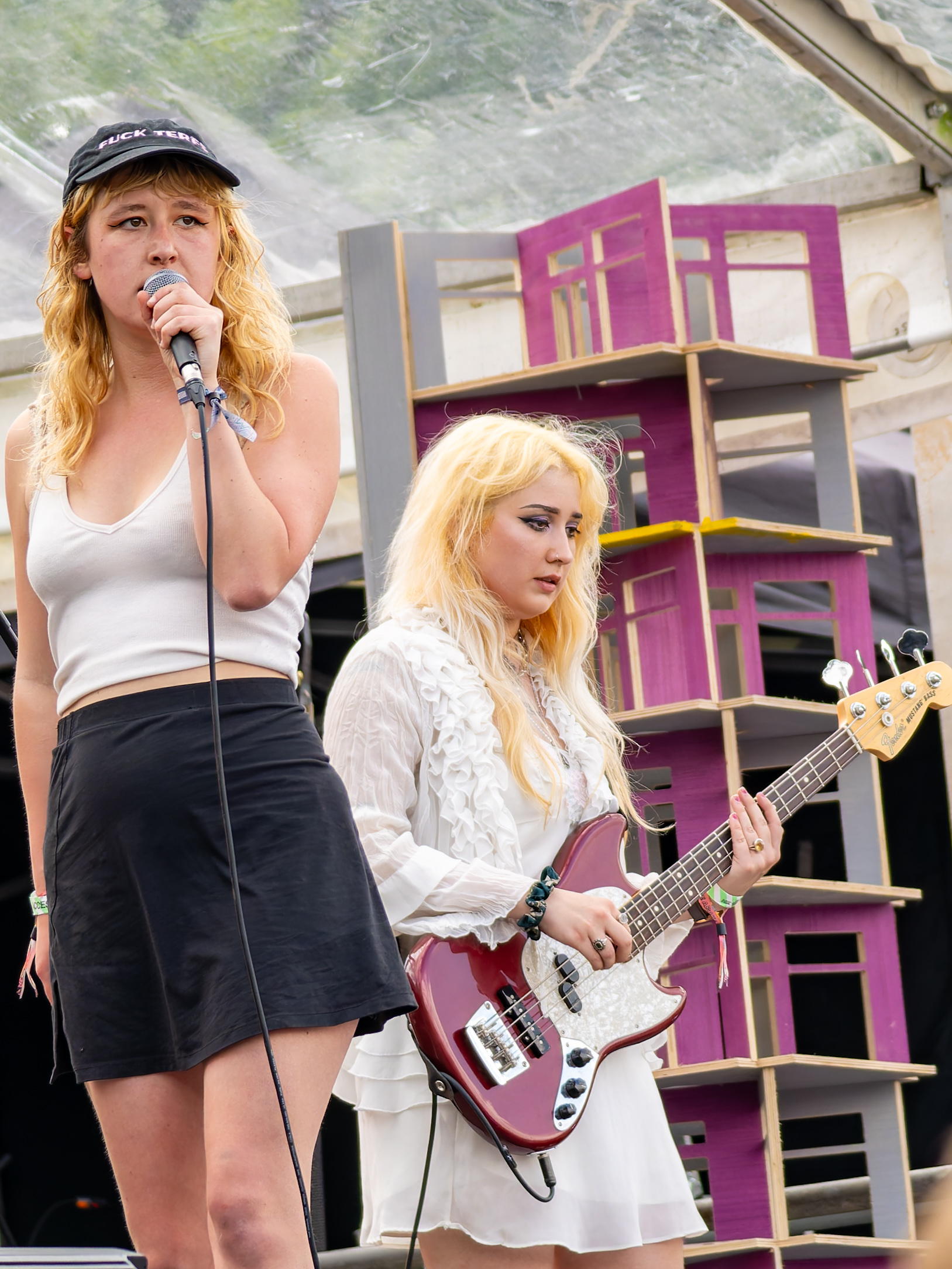
- Performing at Brockwell Park in 2024

Background information
- Origin: Brighton, East Sussex, England
- Genres: Punk rock; noise rock; garage punk; riot grrrl
- Years active: 2019–present
- Labels: Big Scary Monsters; City Slang
- Members: Phoebe Lunny; Selin Macieira-Boşgelmez
- Past members: Flora Kimberly; Fox O'Reilly; Catt Jack
- Website: lambrinigirlsband.co.uk

Lambrini Girls are an English punk rock group. Formed in Brighton, the band currently consists of Phoebe Lunny and Selin Macieira-Boşgelmez. After releasing their debut single in 2021 and signing to Big Scary Monsters by November 2022, in May 2023 they released the EP You're Welcome, which received positive critical reception from music publications. They subsequently drew attention for defending themselves against anti-transgender campaigners. Their 2025 debut album, Who Let the Dogs Out, charted at No. 16 on the UK Albums Chart and received positive reception from multiple outlets.

== History ==
Lambrini Girls were initially formed in Brighton by vocalist Flora Kimberly, guitarist and backing vocalist Phoebe Lunny, bassist and backing vocalist Fox O'Reilly, and drummer Catt Jack. The band performed its first show in May 2019 and took their name from Lambrini, a brand of perry described by Ludovic Hunter-Tilney of the Financial Times as "aimed at the undiscriminating female drinker" and by Lunny as "toilet wine for sluts". By October 2020, Kimberly had left the band and Lunny began handling lead vocal duties. Selin Macieira-Boşgelmez joined to replace Fox when the original bassist was unable to make a show. Lunny and Macieira-Boşgelmez originally met in 2018 while Macieira-Boşgelmez was working behind a bar in Brighton; they later worked at the same bar. They had also previously been members of Wife Swap USA. By 2021, they had released their debut single, "Homewrecker". They signed to Big Scary Monsters after being spotted at The Great Escape Festival in Brighton in 2022, having been asked to fill in for a band who had dropped out last minute.

In November 2022, the band released "Help Me I'm Gay", a track written about queer trivialisation. Louder Than War's Jazz Hodge wrote that the song "replicated the messy sounds" of Warmduscher's "Tainted Lunch" and The Strokes "Juicebox". In May 2023, Emma Wilkes of Rolling Stone wrote that the band would preface performances of the song by asking "gay legends" to put their hand up, and that "usually about half the crowd" would do so. In January 2023, the band appeared on that year's NME 100. The month after, they released "White Van", a track about catcalling, followed by a music video the next month. In April, they released "Lads Lads Lads", a track about lad culture. All three singles appeared on their May 2023 EP You're Welcome, which used a picture of a flaming pile of faeces as its cover art and was part-funded by a £6,000 lump sum Macieira-Boşgelmez had received following the death of her father. By the time of release, Catt Jack had left the band; for the EP's launch at Resident Records in Brighton, The Wytches's Demelza Mather deputised. The vinyl version of the EP included two live tracks. The EP received positive reviews from The Soundboard Reviews, When the Horn Blows, and DIY and charted at No. 29 on the Official Record Store Chart.

In July 2023, following a performance at Iggy Pop's Dog Day Afternoon at Crystal Palace, the anti-transgender campaigner Graham Linehan criticized the band members' support for gender-affirming care for transgender youth, prompting the band to highlight the rate of suicide among transgender youth and accuse Linehan of contributing to it. That September, a May 2023 Kerrang! interview in which Lunny stated that she would "scrap any TERF, any day, in person, with my fists" led the anti-transgender campaigner Louise Distras to accuse the band of inciting violence against women, prompting the pair to reassert their pro-trans stance. In October, Lunny described Matty Healy as "a sexist, misogynistic, racist, piece of shit" and accused fans of The 1975 of condoning his behaviour before releasing a video for the You're Welcome track "Boys in the Band" and releasing a limited edition long sleeve t-shirt with profits going to Refuge, Safeline, and Rape Crisis. Pop later recorded a version of Depeche Mode's "Personal Jesus" with the band for a covers album by Trevor Horn.

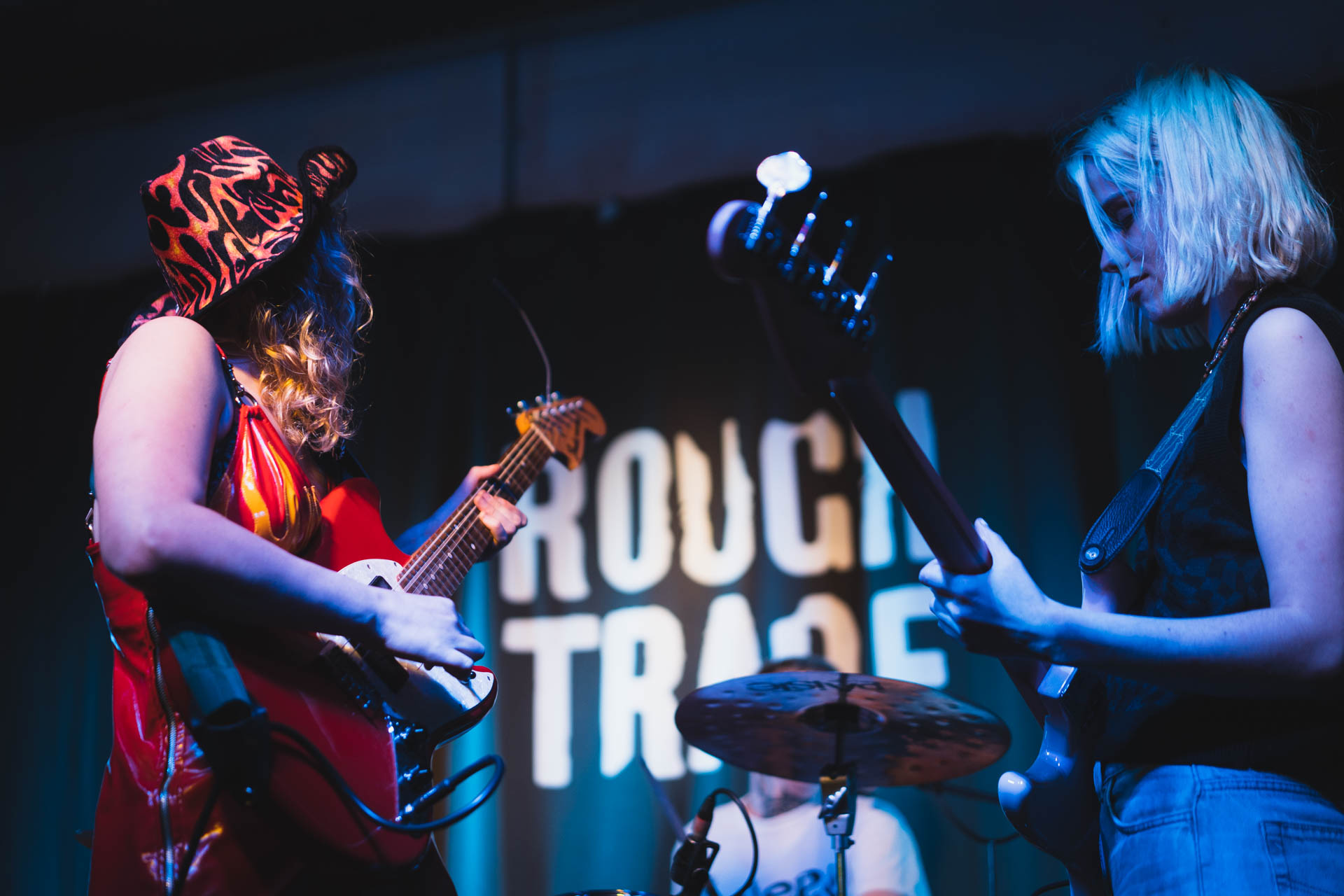
Performing at Rough Trade in 2022

In February 2024, the band released "God's Country", a diatribe against far-right politics, the government of the United Kingdom, the UK politicians Rishi Sunak, Keir Starmer, Dominic Cummings, and David Cameron, and the word "Great" in Great Britain; the track charted at No. 9 on the Official Vinyl Singles Chart. They subsequently dropped out of SXSW and The Great Escape Festival in protest of their sponsors supporting Israel in the Israel-Palestine War. In April 2024, the band released "Body of Mine", a track about gender dysphoria. In September 2024, they released "Company Culture", a sarcastic track written about toxic workplace environments. The following month, they released "Big Dick Energy", a track about toxic masculinity accompanied by a lyric video, and announced the album Who Let the Dogs Out, which took its name from an inside joke involving the song of that name by Baha Men. The month after that, they released "Love", a track about toxic relationships.

Who Let the Dogs Out was released in January 2025 and contained "Company Culture", "Big Dick Energy", and "Love". The album and received positive reviews from the Financial Times, The Guardian, When the Horn Blows, Pitchfork, The Soundboard Reviews, Beats per Minute, DIY, The Arts Desk, Kerrang!, Clash, Rolling Stone, Dork, NME, AllMusic, Narc, Classic Rock, Louder, The Skinny, and MusicOMH. Initially forecast to chart at No. 3 on the UK Albums Chart, the album instead made that week's listing at No. 16, and made No. 2 in the Independent Albums Chart and No. 1 in the Rock & Metal Chart. They promoted the album with music videos for album tracks "Cuntology 101" and "No Homo".

In March 2025, the Lambrini Girls and 57 other artists were awarded funding from that year's Music Export Growth Scheme, with Lisa Nandy - the then-Secretary of State for Culture, Media and Sport - describing the 58 as the "best of British culture". The band received just under £15,000, which funded their driver, tour manager, sound engineer and technician for a European tour. The fact that the band's "God's Country" implied that Britain was full of "racist uncles" and "flag-shaggers" and that Lunny had opined in a February 2024 DIY interview that it was embarrassing to be from England due to its racism and xenophobia led commentators in numerous newspapers to ask why the band were being funded by British tax. In response, Lunny said that it was hypocritical for the far right to be preaching free speech but object to theirs, while Macieira-Boşgelmez opined that only funding bands useful for propaganda would constitute fascism. They released "Cult of Celebrity" and announced a tour in March 2026, but cancelled much of the latter after Lunny broke her neck.

== Personal life and artistry ==
Macieira-Boşgelmez is of German, Turkish, and Portuguese descent and changed her name from Lilly in June 2025, while Lunny is the granddaughter of Irish folk musician Dónal Lunny. They are both neurodivergent and both use she/they pronouns; Macieira-Boşgelmez is bisexual and is bipolar and autistic, while Lunny is a lesbian and has ADHD. By September 2025, Macieira-Boşgelmez had developed tics, prompting Kaitlin Pelkey of Big Girl to cover. The band were inspired by the likes of Le Tigre, Bikini Kill, and Spice Girls and have expressed admiration for contemporaries such as CLT DRP, Snayx, and Currls. Lunny was initially a fan of The Runaways and Huggy Bear and draws on Stevie Nicks, Courtney Love, and No Doubt-era Gwen Stefani in her performance style.

== Band members ==
Current members

- Phoebe Lunny – guitar (2019–present), lead vocals (2020–present), backing vocals (2019–2020)
- Selin Macieira-Boşgelmez – bass guitar, backing vocals (2022–present)

Current touring musicians

- Misha Phillips – drums (2023–present)

Former members

- Flora Kimberly – lead vocals (2019–2020)
- Fox O'Reilly – bass guitar (2019–2022)
- Catt Jack – drums, backing vocals (2019–2023)

Former touring musicians

- Kaitlin Pelkey – bass (2025–2026; substitute for Selin Macieira-Boşgelmez)

Timeline

== Discography ==
=== Albums ===
- Who Let the Dogs Out (2025)
- No Refunds (2027)

=== EPs ===
- You're Welcome (2023)

=== Singles ===
- "Homewrecker" (2020)
- "Help Me I'm Gay" (2022)
- "White Van" (2023)
- "Lads Lads Lads" (2023)
- "God's Country" / "Body Of Mine" (2024)
- "Company Culture" (2024)
- "Big Dick Energy" (2024)
- "Love" (2024)
- "Cult of Celebrity" (2026)
- "Bang Bang Bang" (2026)
- "The Basement" (2026)
