= Move It Like This =

Studio album by Baha Men
- Released: March 26, 2002
- Genre: Junkanoo, hip hop, reggae
- Length: 53:18
- Label: S-Curve; Capitol
- Producer: Mike Mangini; Steve Greenberg; Pop Rox; Kendal Stubbs; The Triangle; Mr. G; Mark Hudson; Danny Browne

Baha Men chronology
| Who Let the Dogs Out (2000) | Move It Like This (2002) | Greatest Movie Hits (2002) |

Singles from Move It Like This
- 1. "Best Years of Our Lives" Released: June 11, 2001; 2. "Move It Like This" Released: February 17, 2002; 3. "We Rubbin'" Released: 2002

Professional ratings
Review scores
| Source | Rating |
|---|---|
| Allmusic | 3/5 stars |
| Entertainment Weekly | B− |

Move It Like This is the seventh studio album released by Bahamas-based group Baha Men. It was released in 2002 under the S-Curve label. The album includes a cover of Harry Nilsson's "Coconut". None of the songs rose to success, including the album's title single "Move It Like This," but the album did chart at number 57 on the Billboard 200. Two of the songs were used in feature films including "Move It Like This" (Big Fat Liar) and "Best Years of Our Lives" (Shrek). One of the VEE's Shows used this song in "Barney Live in Concert".

== Track listing ==
1. "Move It Like This" – 3:24
2. "Coconut" – 4:00
3. "Normal" – 3:17
4. "I Thank Heaven" – 4:05
5. "Best Years of Our Lives" – 2:57
6. "Break Away" – 3:13
7. "Rich in Love" (with guest vocals by Daphne Rubin-Vega) – 4:42
8. "Giddyup" – 4:09
9. "Blow Your Mind" – 3:49
10. "We Rubbin'" – 3:05
11. "I Just Want to Fool Around" – 3:32
12. "Wave" – 4:01
13. "Move It Like This (Shake It Like That Mix)" – 3:31

== Charts ==
| Chart (2002) | Peak position |
|---|---|
| U.S. Billboard 200 | 57 |

== Certifications and sales ==
| Region | Certification | Certified units/sales |
|---|---|---|
| United States | — | 279,000 |
