= John Canoe =

18th-century Gold Coast merchant and Ahanta chief

- chief of the Ahanta, 1708–1724
- Reign: 1708–1724
- Born: unknown
- Died: circa 1725, Fort Fredericksburg?

John Canoe, also known as January Conny (died circa 1725), was the European name given to an Akan warrior from Axim, Ghana. He was a chief of the Ahanta people in the early 18th century, who established a stronghold in the defunct Fort Fredericksburg (present-day Princes Town) and fought multiple wars with European traders for twenty years. The stronghold finally fell in 1725, though Canoe's fate is unknown. He is commemorated in the Junkanoo festival held in the Caribbean each December.

== History ==
=== Origin of John Canoe ===
January Conny (also named John Kenu, Johann Kuny, John Conrad, Johann Cuny, Jean Cunny, January Konny or John Conni by German, Dutch, British or French-language designation) was a powerful African merchant of the Gold Coast in the late 17th and early 18th centuries. Conny had a private army and was an ally of Brandenburg-Prussia at the time of the Brandenburger Gold Coast colony (1683–1720) in Axim on the coast of present-day Ghana in West Africa. Between 25 December 1708 to 1724, he controlled the abandoned Brandenburger fortress of Fort Fredericksburg and defended it against several massive conquest attempts by the Dutch.

In the 19th century, followers of a German colonial commitment distorted the history of the defence of the fortress for their own propaganda purposes. The tale of January Conny has today spread to different parts of the Caribbean. Ghana's Fancy Dress Festival was probably also based on the story of January Conny.

The names listed above are European corruptions of a still unknown African name. It is widely believed that "Kenu" was a part of it, as this is a typical Akan name.

Jon Conny, chief of the Ahanta people, was often referred to as "the King of Prinze Terre". He was Prussia's African broker and so effective in directing trade to the fort that revenues dwindled at the Dutch forts at Axim, Butre and Sekondi. More than 95 ships are recorded as having traded with Fort Fredericksburg between 1711 and 1713. In 1717, the Brandenburgers departed from the Gold Coast, selling their possessions to the Dutch, without notifying John Conny.

Despite this internal conflict, Conny remained a middleman of the Brandenburgers and, with their support, led a two-year conflict against neighbouring Dutch and British bases. In the course of this war, he attacked the neighbouring British trading post Fort Metal Cross at Dixcove, which was seriously damaged. During these events he was able not only to provide support for his private army (warriors of the Ashanti (Asante) and Wassa), but also provided support to his local population of Ahanta people and brokers against the Dixcove traders and the Dutch base Butre recourse.

January Conny had a large number of muskets and cannons, with which he repelled several attacks by the Dutch. He commanded at that time an army of around 20,000 men.

In 1724, after seven years of control of the fortress, he gave up and withdrew from the Brandenburger Gold Coast. Later he was defeated by the Fante troops led by an Asafo. After the capture of Prince's Town, John Kenu vanished into obscurity, possibly escaping to Kumasi, the capital of his Asante allies.

Jan Conny was considered one of the three or four major African traders of the 18th century in Ghana. Jan Conny, John Kabes Thomas Ewusi, ^{9}and a fourth unknown man commanded large private armies and became national wholesalers of a significant part of trade (and hence also of the slave trade) with the Europeans on the Gold Coast.

=== Creation of the John Canoe Festival ===
John Canoe/Junkanoo festival
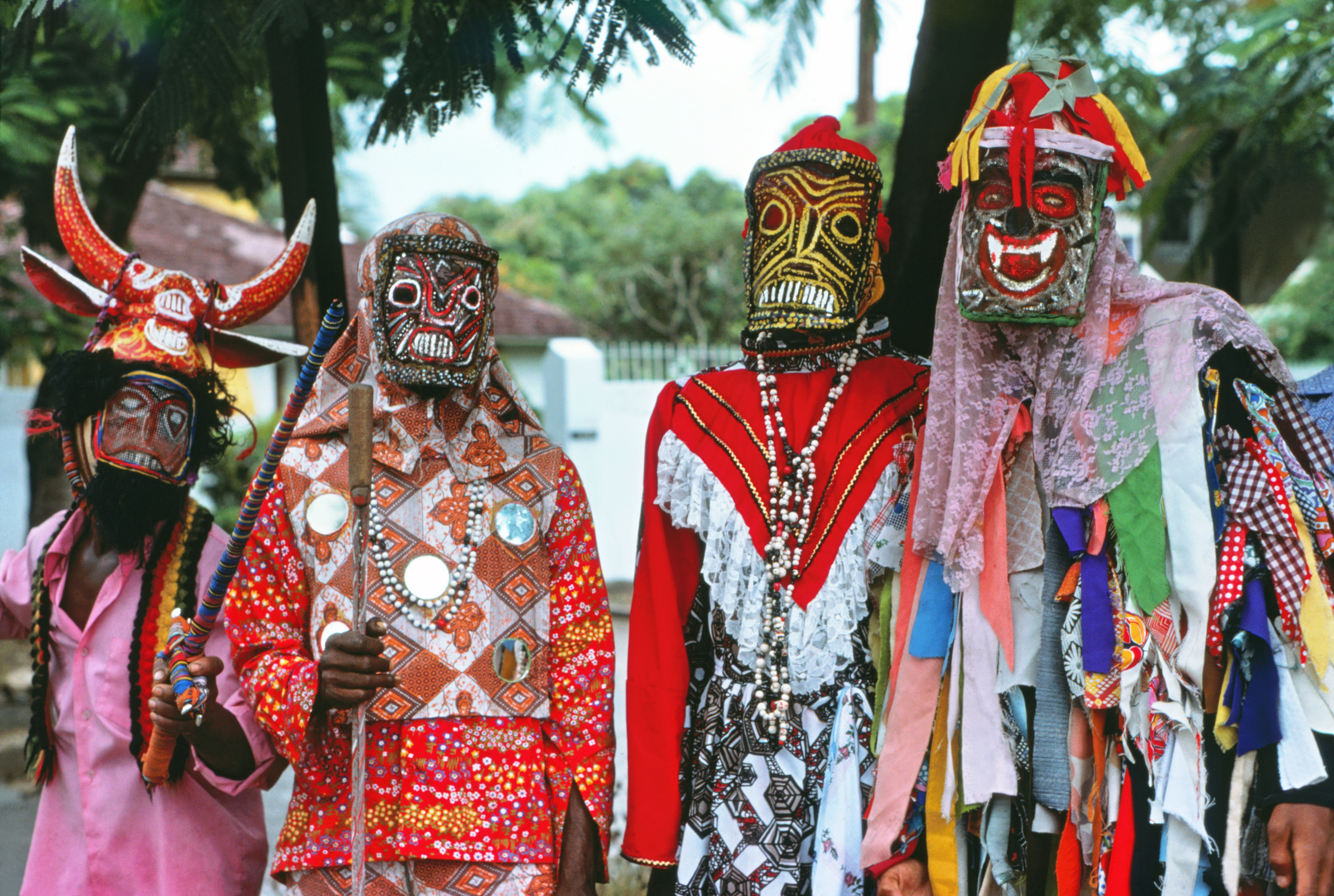
- John Canoe celebrants (Kingston, Jamaica, Christmas 1975)
- Status: Active
- Genre: Folk festival, street festival, parade
- Country: The Bahamas, Belize, Jamaica, United States (Florida, North Carolina)

According to Edward Long, an 18th-century Jamaican slaveholder and historian, the John Canoe festival was created in the Caribbean by those Akan who had fought for John Canoe at Fort Fredericksburg, been enslaved after their defeat there, and shipped to colonial Jamaica. The festival featured motifs from battles typical of Akan fashion. For instance, the Ashanti swordsman became the "horned headed man"; the Ashanti commander became "Pitchy patchy", who wears a battledress with what would resemble charms, referred to as a "Batakari".

== See also ==
- Junkanoo, the Bahamian and Turks and Caicos Islands spelling.
- Afro-Jamaican
- Coromantee, an archaic or out-dated term to mean Akan
- Fancy Dress Festival, also known as Kakamotobi
- Kundum Festival, an Ahanta masquerade dedicated to exorcism of "devils".
