= Who Let the Dogs Out (Baha Men album) =

Album by Baha Men

- Original cover

Studio album by Baha Men
- Released: 26 July 2000
- Studio: Circle House; Gentlemen's Club, Miami Beach, Florida; Mojo Music, New York
- Genre: Junkanoo; dance; hip hop
- Length: 47:35
- Label: S-Curve; Artemis
- Producer: Pete Amato; Jeffrey Chea; Skoti-Alain Elliot; Anthony Flowers; Steve Greenberg; Herschel Small; Desmond Child; Mark Hudson; Michael Mangini

Baha Men chronology
2 Zero 0-0 (1999)	Who Let the Dogs Out (2000)	Move It Like This (2002)

Singles from Who Let the Dogs Out
- 1. "Who Let the Dogs Out" Released: July 26, 2000; 2. "You All Dat" Released: February 10, 2001

Professional ratings
Review scores
Source	Rating
AllMusic	4/5 stars

Who Let the Dogs Out is the sixth studio album by Bahamas-based musical group Baha Men. It was released by S-Curve Records and Edel Music in 2000.

== Track listing ==
Who Let the Dogs Out track listing
No.	Title	Writer(s)	Length
1.	"Who Let the Dogs Out"	Anslem Douglas	3:16
2.	"You All Dat" (feat. Imani Coppola)	Nehemiah Heild; Steven Greenberg; Mark Hudson; Herschel Small; Michael Mangini; Solomon Linda	3:24
3.	"Get Ya Party On"	Michael Mangini; Cedric Poitier; Anthony Flowers; Herschell Small; Marvin Prosper; Patrick Carey; Colyn Grant; Jeffrey Chea	3:17
4.	"Getting Hotter"	Herschel Small; Patrick Carey; Marvin Prosper	3:48
5.	"Summer of Love"	Mark Hudson; Dennis Scott; Kenneth Scott; Steve Dudas	4:13
6.	"You Can Get It"	Desmond Child; Herschell Small	4:13
7.	"It's All in the Mind"	Anthony Flowers; Marvin Prosper; Skoti-Alain Elliot; Herschell Small; Patrick Carey	3:36
8.	"Where Did I Go Wrong"	Jeffrey Chea; Harlem Curly Wilson; Herschell Small; Anthony Curtis; Marvin Prosper	4:00
9.	"You're Mine"	Colyn Grant; Herschell Small	3:46
10.	"What's Up, Come On"	Anthony Flowers; Herschell Small; Jeffrey Chea	3:02
11.	"Shake It Mamma"	Anthony Flowers; Cedric Poitier	4:04
12.	"Who Let the Dogs Out" (Barking Mad Mix)	Anslem Douglas	3:09
Total length:			47:35

Bonus tracks
No.	Title	Writer(s)	Length
13.	"You All That" (Dance Remix)	Nehemiah Heild; Steven Greenberg; Mark Hudson; Herschel Small; Michael Mangini; Solomon Linda	3:47
14.	"Burn the Noo Junk"
15.	"Bahama Baha"
16.	"Who Let the Dogs Out" (remix, featuring Diane Turner & Andy Brown)

== Charts ==
=== Weekly charts ===
Weekly chart performance for Who Let the Dogs Out
Chart (2000–2001)	Peak position
Australian Albums (ARIA)	16
Australian Dance Albums (ARIA)	7
New Zealand Albums (RMNZ)	12
Swiss Albums (Schweizer Hitparade)	31
UK Albums (OCC)	100
UK Independent Albums (OCC)	27
UK R&B Albums (OCC)	35
US Billboard 200	5
US Independent Albums (Billboard)	1

=== Year-end charts ===
Year-end chart performance for Who Let the Dogs Out
Chart (2000)	Position
Canadian Albums (Nielsen SoundScan)	111
US Billboard 200	70
Chart (2001)	Position
US Billboard 200	38

== Certifications and sales ==
Certifications and sales for Who Let the Dogs Out
Region	Certification	Certified units/sales
Australia (ARIA)	Gold	35,000^{^}
New Zealand (RMNZ)	Platinum	15,000^{^}
United States (RIAA)	3× Platinum	3,018,000
^{^} Shipments figures based on certification alone.
