= You All Dat =

2001 single by Baha Men

"You All Dat" is a song recorded by the Bahamian group, Baha Men featuring uncredited guest vocals from American vocalist Imani Coppola. Originally on 2 Zero 0-0, a re-recorded version was released in January 2001 as the second and final single from their album, Who Let the Dogs Out following the departure of original lead singer Nehemiah Hield. It reached the top 10 in Australia and reached the top 20 in the United Kingdom.

== Content ==
The song, which samples "The Lion Sleeps Tonight", is about a man trying to seduce a woman at a party.

A "clean" edit changes the line "You gotta have balls or you ain't gonna get none" to "You gotta be bold or you ain't gonna get none."

"You All Dat"

Single by Baha Men

from the album 2 Zero 0-0 and Who Let the Dogs Out
- B-side: "You're Mine"
- Released: 22 January 2001
- Genre: Ragga, big beat
- Length: 3:27
- Label: Island Def Jam Music Group/Mercury
- Songwriters: Nehemiah Heild; Michael Mangini/Steven Greenberg; Mark Hudson; Herschel Small; Solomon Linda
- Producer: Steve Greenberg (record producer) Michael Mangini

Baha Men singles chronology
"Who Let the Dogs Out" (2000)	"You All Dat" (2001)	"Best Years of Our Lives" (2001)

== Track listings ==
CD maxi – Europe

1. "You All Dat" (Radio Edit) – 3:32
2. "You All Dat" (Berman Brother Radio Edit) – 3:51
3. "You All Dat" (Berman Brothers Remix Instrumental) – 3:49
4. "You're Mine" – 3:46

== Charts and sales ==
=== Weekly charts ===
Weekly chart performance for "You All Dat"
Chart (2001)	Peak position
Australia (ARIA)	8
Austria (Ö3 Austria Top 40)	59
Germany (GfK)	62
Ireland (IRMA)	26
New Zealand (Recorded Music NZ)	21
Scotland Singles (Official Charts)	18
Sweden (Sverigetopplistan)	49
Switzerland (Schweizer Hitparade)	86
UK Singles (Official Charts)	14
UK Hip Hop/R&B (Official Charts)	7
UK Indie (Official Charts)	3
US Billboard Hot 100	94

=== Year-end charts ===
Year-end chart performance for "You All Dat"
Chart (2001)	Position
Australia (ARIA)	46

== In popular media ==
The song was featured in season 2, episode 15 ("The Grandparents") of Malcolm in the Middle. It was also included on the show's soundtrack, Music from Malcolm in the Middle, released in 2000.
