= Pitchy Patchy =

Figure from Jamaican carnival

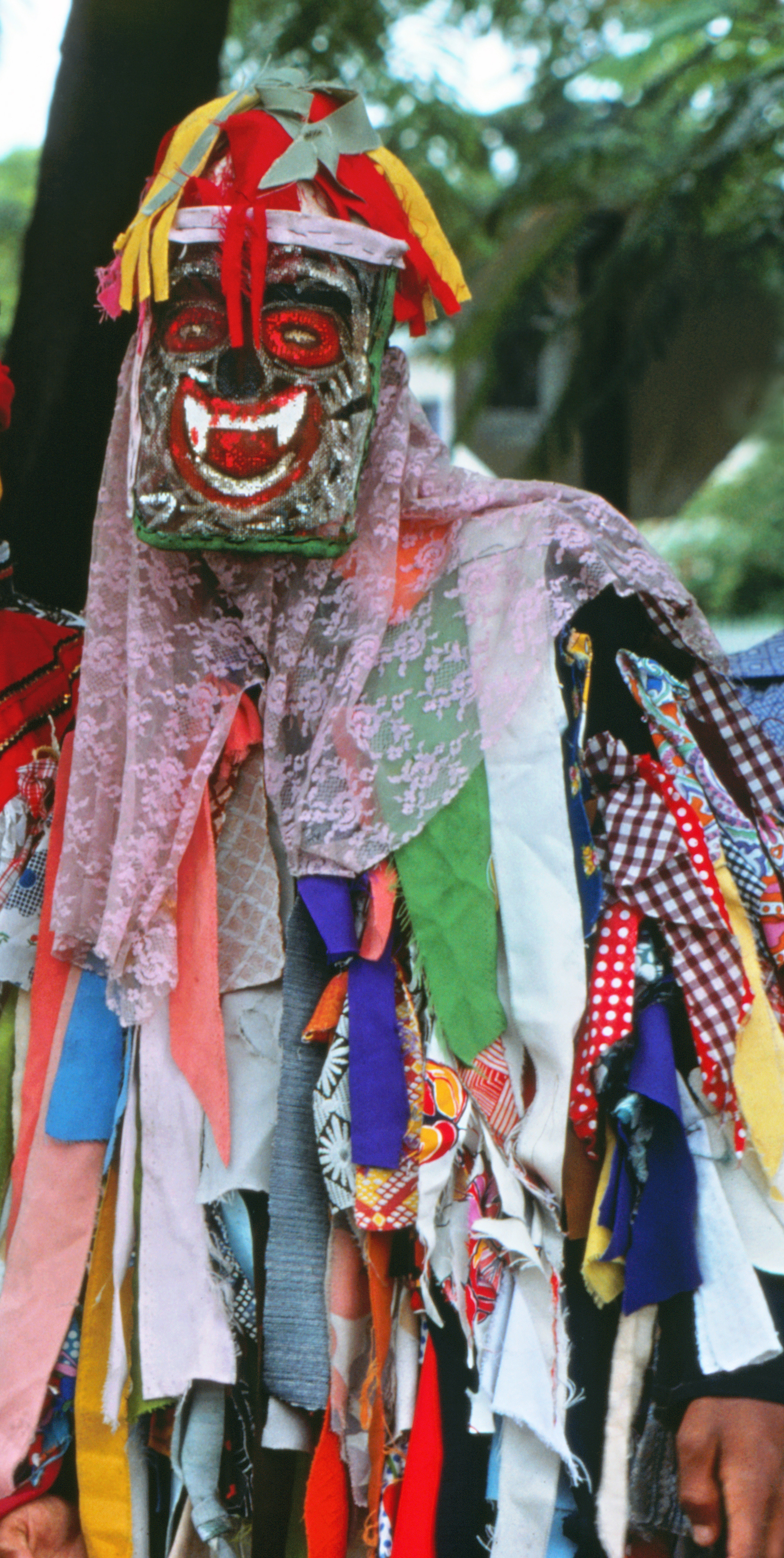
Junkanoo in Kingston, 1975

Pitchy Patchy is a costumed character in Jamaican Jankunu festivals. Other characters include: King and Queen, Cow Head, Horse Head, Red Indians and Belly Woman.

One of the original figures of Jamaican Jankunu character, Pitchy Patchy is usually represented by a suit made of tattered, colorful pieces of cloth. Pitchy Patchy's role in the carnival is to keep masqueraders and the surrounding crowd in order by cracking a cattle whip. According to Edward Long, the character originated from Akan festivals in celebration of John Canoe; the Ashanti commander became Pitchy Patchy, wearing battledress with what would resemble charms, referred to as a "Batakari".
