= Fancy Dress Festival =

Masquerade festival in Winneba, Ghana

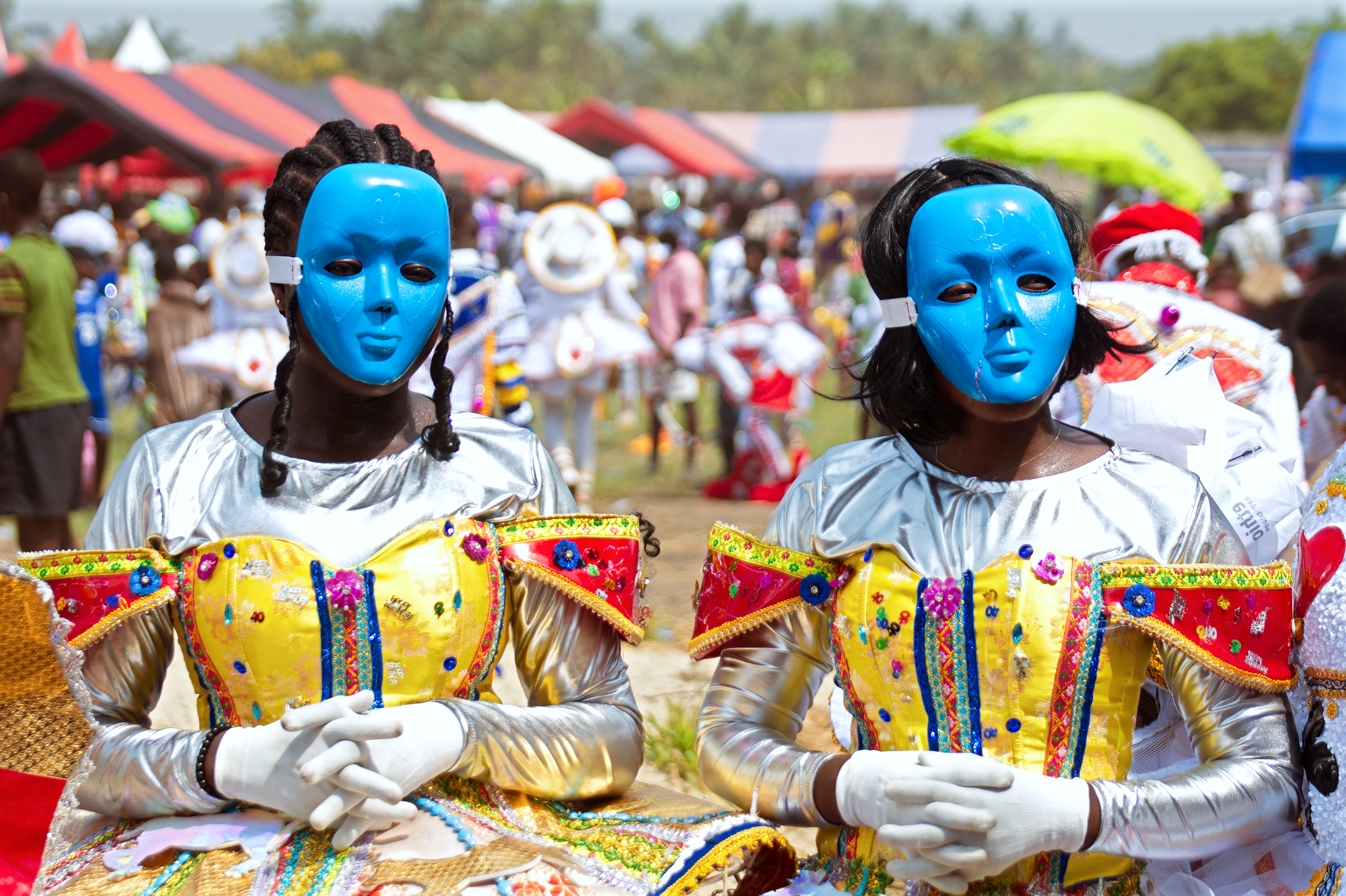
Winneba masquerade festival

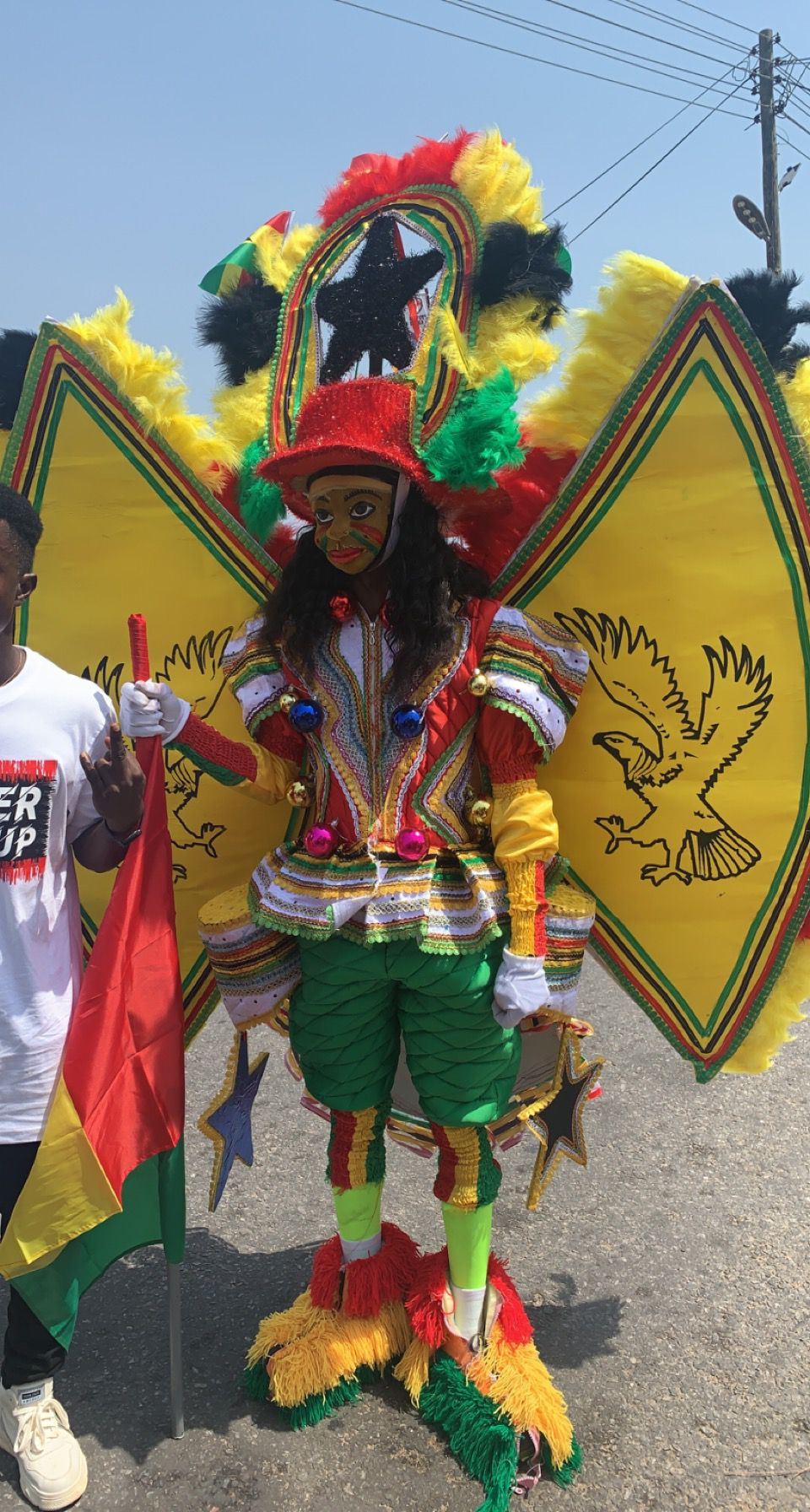
Winneba masquerade festival

The Fancy Dress Festival (known locally as Kakamotobi) is a masquerade festival held on Christmas to the first day of January every year by the people of Winneba in the Central Region of Ghana. It is a colourful festival that features brass band music.

== History ==
Dutch and British traders at the Winneba seaport began the tradition of the festival in the 18th century. Wearing assorted masks, they danced and drank in white-owned bars celebrating Christmas. Janka Abraham, who hailed from Saltpond, also in the Central Region, and worked as a bar attendant at one of these bars, thought of incorporating the masquerade tradition and festival into local custom. He founded the troop known as Nobles with his friend, pharmacist A. K. Yamoah, in the Alata Kokwado neighborhood around 1923 or 1924. People who belonged to A. K. Yamoah's football club and indoor games groups joined. Membership required the ability to speak the English language.

=== Early days ===
The members of the Nobles would gather before dawn on Christmas Day, dressed up in costumes, such as garb of doctors, nurses, teachers, ministers, pastors, farmers, fishermen, prostitutes, pastors, drivers, cowboys, sailors, angels, or even the white colonial masters. The idea was to imitate the various town professions and parody the Europeans. The troop would then parade through the streets of Winneba, backed by adaha music, and would continue all day into the evening.

=== Name change ===
The name "Fancy Dress" was used because the Egyaa group, which was made up of fishermen who spoke no English, had a hard time pronouncing the word "masquerade". Instead, they used the term "Fancy Dress", which they pronounced "fanti dress".

== Growth of groups ==
After some years, membership in the Nobles was opened to all residents of Winneba. This led to an increase in membership. Based on the activities of the Nobles, in 1926 the paramount chief of Winneba, Nana Kow Sackey (Ayirebi Acquah III), and his friends formed Egyaa, a second group, at Aboadze, a fishing community. The town folks referred to the Nobles as "Number One" and Egyaa as "Number Two".

=== Formation of Number Three ===
In 1930, members of the Gyateh royal family, who did not approve of Kow Sackey's support for the Egyaa group, formed another group in the Gyateh area of Donkoyemu. Called Tumbo rusu (pronounced tumus)—which translates as the sound of the blacksmith's anvil—the group was led by Gyateh family members Arkoful, a blacksmith, Kweku Akom, and Inkabi. It drew its membership from Catholic youths with little education from local fishing communities, and members of the nearby Winneba Catholic Church. The European priests paid for new costumes each year and for European masks, funding the group so well that it became the most highly esteemed Fancy Dress Company. One of the group's members was enamored of the character of Robin Hood, but accidentally shot the nephew of a priest in the eye with a stray arrow on Christmas Day in 1930. The tragic mishap led the groups to ban portrayal of that character in the Fancy Dress celebrations by anyone over the age of seven.

=== Formation of Number Four ===
One of A. K. Yamoah's brothers, A. W. Yamoah, moved to Abasraba, a suburb of Winneba, in 1933. A merchant by trade, he imported masks and brass instruments and founded a Fancy Dress group called Red Cross or Number Four. This group was composed mainly of the town elite, including high school and college youth; prospective members had to pass entrance exams on English language and Ghanaian cultural studies. Adult members of means paid monthly dues, which funded the importing of costumes and Halloween masks from abroad at year's end. Children below eight years of age and poor families did not pay, although they had to accept the attire that paying members chose for them.

== Brass band music ==
In its early years, the music for all groups in the festival was traditional adaha music. Brass band music had been introduced to the region in 1880s by European missionaries and military groups. In 1934, Catholic priests introduced brass band music to the festival by bringing in a band that had received training from Presbyterian missionaries in the nearby town of Swedru Bibianiha. The band was not skilled and it knew only one song ("Abaawa Begye Wo Letter Kema Woewuraba"; in English "Maidservant, This is a Letter for Your Madam"), which it played throughout the day. In reaction to the annoyance of hearing one song played continuously, A. W. Yamoah arranged to provide training in brass instruments for some of his family members. The resulting new band was more skilled than the one from Swedru Bibiani. The Nobles group also formed a brass band. However, because most members of these bands preferred masquerading over playing in a band, for festival days bands typically are recruited from outside the local groups.

== Structure ==
All groups have a common hierarchy: in charge is the group father, previously often a noble but now most likely to be a well-educated male, who manages the finances and venues as well as the welfare of members in general. Under him are the band leader, who organises rehearsals and teaches the music, the Fancy Dress leader, who looks after choreography and interviews potential new members, and the group mother, who looks after food and settles disputes. She is also treated as a biological mother by group members. Cowboys are fit and strong members who are answerable to the Fancy Dress leader and look after general members. Then there are scouts, stilt walkers, and general members under the cowboys' control. Scouts move ahead and solicit money from onlookers for the group.

== Gallery ==
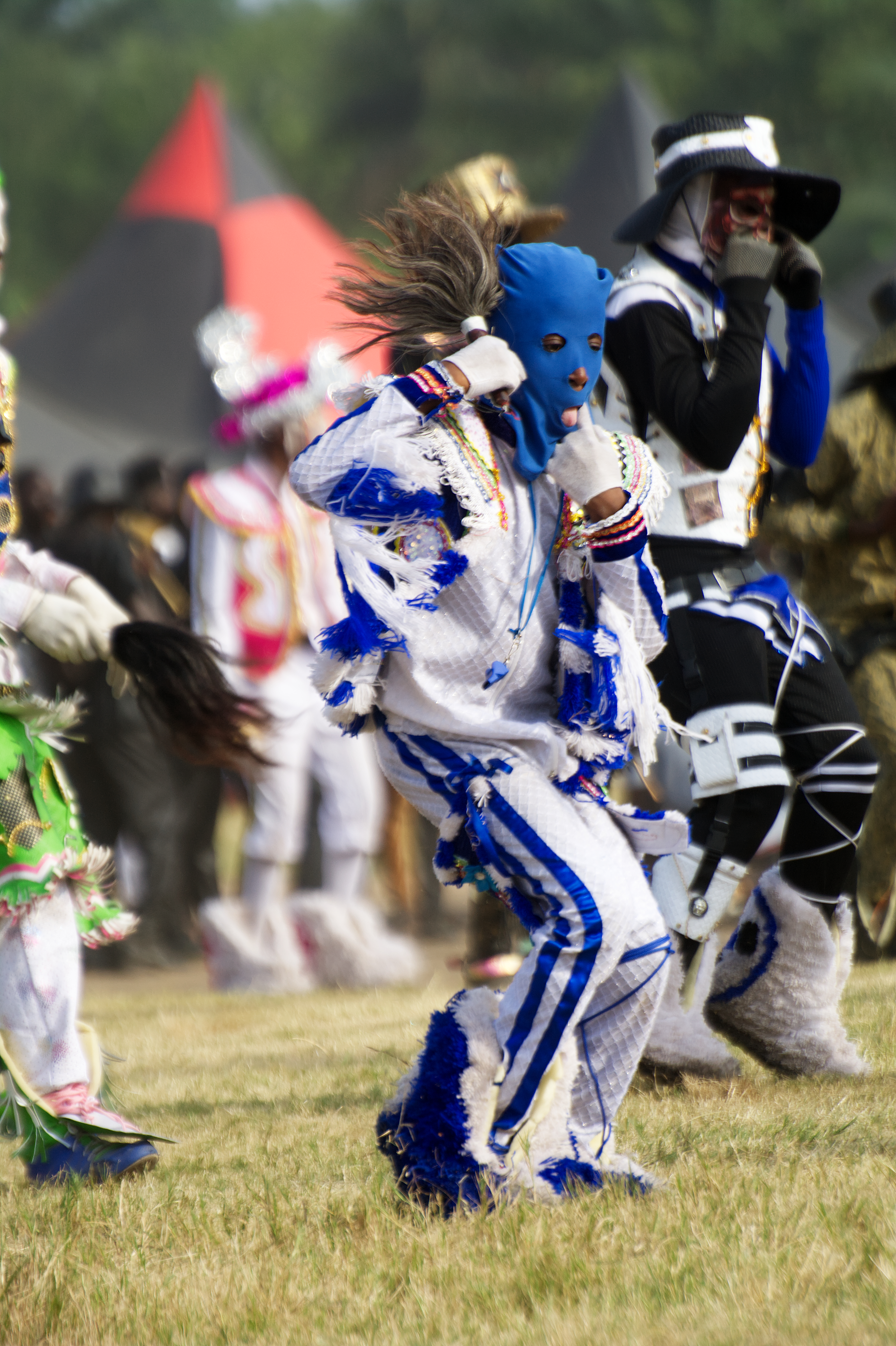
A masquerader in a fancy dress

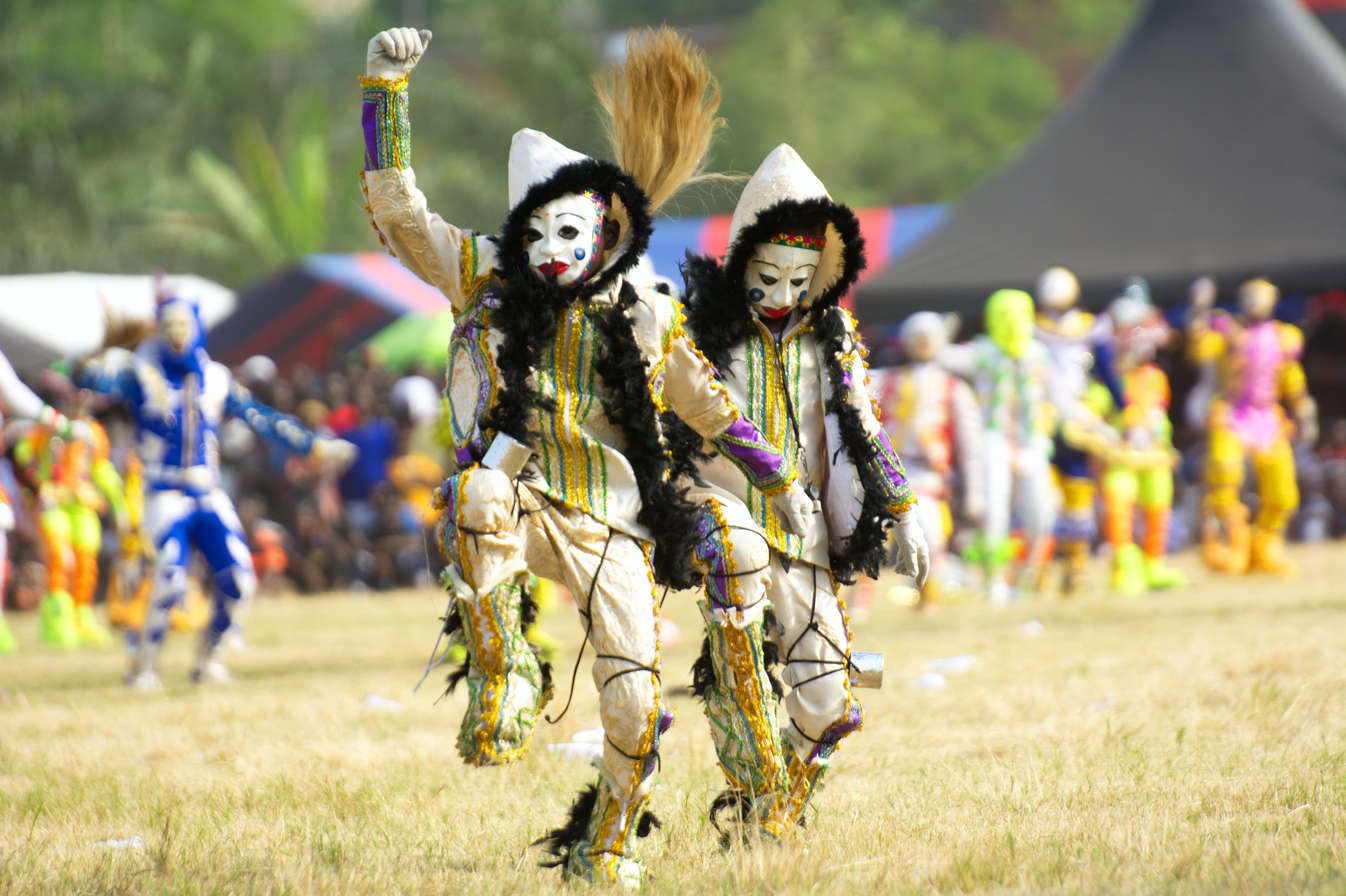
Masqueraders

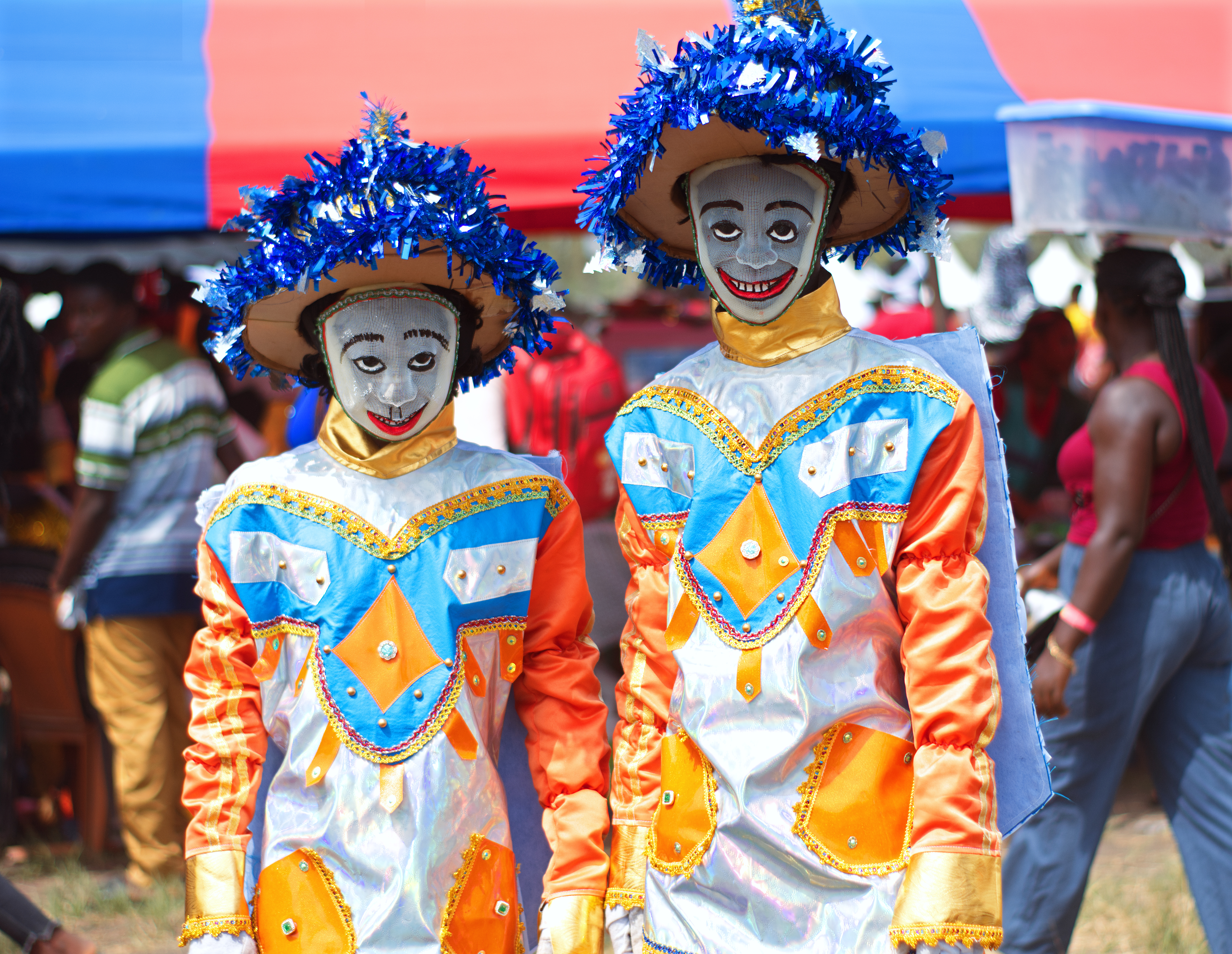

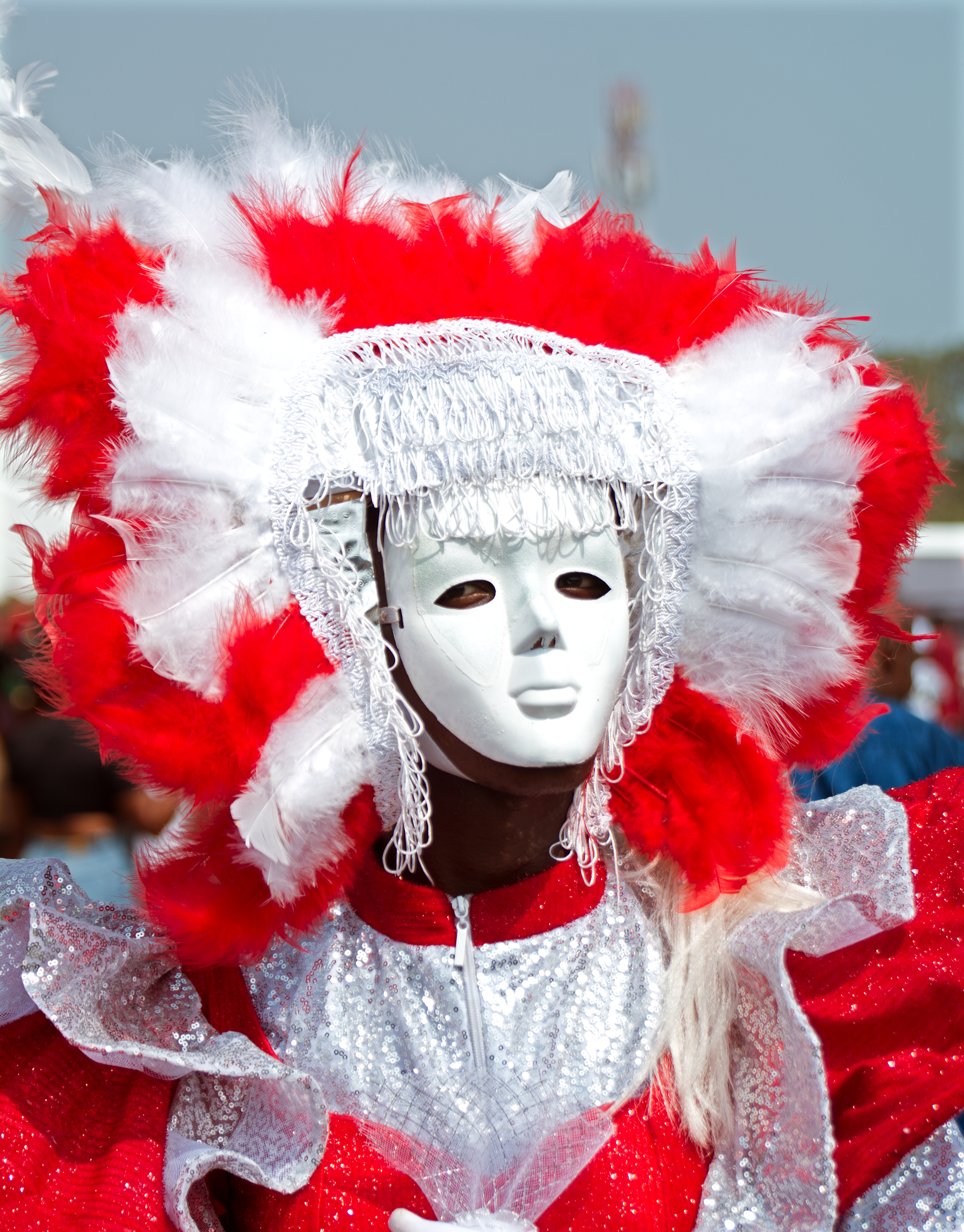

== See also ==
- John Canoe – a Caribbean festival that has the same cultural derivative.
