= Lil Bitts =

Lil Bitts (born Shivonne Liesl-Anne Churche, 31 October 1984) is a soca musician from Trinidad and Tobago. She is best known for her hits "Bump", "Crush" and "Hold Meh".

== Biography ==
Lil Bitts, together with Mel (Shivorne Melissa Mitchell), Miki (Tamika Ward-Lewis) and CutieRae (Elena Rachel Rawlins), launched the Making Music to Benefit Charities (M2BC) Foundation in 2009. The Foundation organises fund raisers and hosts various events throughout Trinidad to raise money to purchase instruments for numerous homes and orphanages in Trinidad.

In 2010, Lil Bitts established an entertainment services company, Go 4wd Entertainment. The company aims to serve new and rising young artistes, providing development as well as booking services.

Lil Bitts has performed in Antigua, The Bahamas, Barbados, Canada, Grenada, Guyana, Jamaica, St. Vincent and the United States whilst regularly appearing on stage in Trinidad. She is actively supported by her fan club, known as the Bitts Army.

International Soca Monarch and Groovy Soca Monarch Competitions

- 2011 - Semi finalist Power Soca and Groovy Soca categories.
- 2012 - Semi finalist Groovy Soca category
- 2013 - Finalist Power Soca category. Finals held on 8 February 2013.

== Discography ==
=== Solo ===
- Spin Yuh Towel (2002)
- Groove Mih (2002)
- Doh Leh Go (2003)
- Bump (2005)
- Esta Fiesta (2005)
- Ah Little Bit (2007)
- Hold Meh (2009)
- Careful (2010)
- Everywhere (2010)
- Go Down Low (2011)
- Sweetness (2011)
- We Own The Night (2011)
- Parade of De Bandz (2011)
- Mischief (2011)
- Ketchin It (2011)
- Stormin (2012)
- Horner Woman (Free Up Riddim) (2012)
- Juk (PM1 Riddim) (2012)
- Panorama (2012)
- Raise De Dust (2012)
- Instruction (2013)

=== Collaborations ===
- In My Country (featuring Bunji Garlin) (2004)
- Somebody (featuring Piers Baron) (2006)
- Crush (featuring Sean Caruth) (2006)
- Juicy Bitts (featuring Juicy Jahbami) (2007)
- Luv U For Eva (featuring Bunji Garlin) (2007)
- Dis Year (featuring Olatunji Yearwood) (2009)
- Careful (remix featuring Skinny Fabulous) (2010)
