= Who Let the Dogs Out =

2000 single by Baha Men

"Who Let the Dogs Out" (originally titled "Doggie") is a song written by the Trinidadian musician Anslem Douglas and then recorded by the Bahamian Junkanoo band Baha Men. Originally released by Douglas as "Doggie" in 1998, it was covered by the English producer Jonathan King who sang it under the name Fat Jakk and his Pack of Pets. King brought the song to the attention of his friend Steve Greenberg, who then had the Baha Men cover the song.

The Baha Men version, released in 2000, became the band's sole hit in the United States, and it gained popularity after appearing in the film Rugrats in Paris: The Movie. It peaked at No. 2 on the UK singles chart, as well as topping the charts in Australia and New Zealand, and reached the Top 40 in the United States. In Britain, it was championed by DJ John Peel and went on to be the fourth-biggest-selling single of 2000 and one of the highest-selling singles of the decade not to reach No. 1. The track went on to win the Grammy for Best Dance Recording at the 2001 Grammy Awards.

According to Douglas, the original song was a feminist anthem critical of men who catcall women. "Who Let the Dogs Out" became a prominent feature of Bahamian popular culture and was the subject of a major lawsuit over copyright ownership that was settled in the decades since its release. In 2019, an eponymous-titled documentary about the creation of the song was the surprise hit of the SXSW music festival in Austin, Texas.

== Origin ==
The song was originally released in 1998 as "Doggie" (or "Dogie") by Trinidadian calypso/soca/Junkanoo artist Anslem Douglas. Douglas himself has said that the song has nothing to do with dogs and actually has a feminist theme critical of men who catcall women. In an interview that was published on his website, he said:

It's a man-bashing song. I'll tell you why. The lyric of the song says, "The party was nice, the party was pumpin'." When I said the word "party" I was being metaphorical. It really means things were going great. The "Yippie-Yi-Yo," that's everybody's happy, right? "And everybody was having a ball." Life was going great. "Until the men start the name-callin' / And then the girls respond to the call." So the men started calling the women "skank" and "skettel," every dirty word you can think of. The men started the name-calling and then the girls respond to the call. And then a woman shouts out, "Who let the dogs out?" And we start calling men dogs. It was really a man-bashing song.

Douglas has stated that he did not come up with the song's namesake phrase himself. The origins of the phrase have been disputed. Variations of the "Who let the dogs out?” chant are evident in regional high school sports, the oldest surviving footage of which is 1986 footage from a game at Reagan High School in Austin, Texas. In 1992, Brett Hammock and Joe Gonzalez also recorded a song called "Who Let the Dogs Out?” as rap duo Miami Boom Productions out of Jacksonville, Florida. In 1995, 20 Fingers and Gillette released "You're a Dog" with a similar chorus. Following the success of the Baha Men version of the song, producers Patrick Stephenson and Leroy Williams said that they had previously written a radio promo for WBLK in Buffalo, New York, containing the "Who Let The Dogs Out" phrase.

== Baha Men version ==
"Who Let the Dogs Out"

Single by Baha Men

from the album Who Let the Dogs Out and Rugrats in Paris: The Movie: Music From the Motion Picture
- Released: 26 July 2000
- Genre: Miami bass; soca; breakbeat; calypso; junkanoo
- Length: 3:18
- Label: S-Curve
- Songwriter: Anslem Douglas
- Producers: Steve Greenberg; Michael Mangini

Baha Men singles chronology
"That's the Way I Get Down" (1997)	"Who Let the Dogs Out" (2000)	"You All Dat" (2001)

Audio sample
- file; help

Music video
- "Who Let the Dogs Out" on YouTube

Baha Men member Dyson Knight explained to Vice how the band came to record the song:

The manager of the Baha Men at that time heard a version of the song from Europe. He called [Knight's bandmate] Isaiah [Taylor] and told him it was an absolute must that Baha Men record that song, because they had the vibe to make it a huge hit. Isaiah heard the song and said there was "no way in hell we're recording that song". ... Management had the vision, and the Baha Men were reluctant, but the group went in and recorded it anyway.

== Critical reception ==
Daily Record commented, "If your kids have been out barking on the streets late at night, this Bahamian band are to blame with this silly Notting Hill Carnival anthem." In a 2007 poll conducted by Rolling Stone to identify the 20 most annoying songs, "Who Let the Dogs Out" ranked third. It was also ranked first on Spinner's 2008 list of "Top 20 Worst Songs Ever". Rolling Stone also ranked it at number 8 on a "worst songs of the 1990s" poll, despite the fact that the Baha Men single was released in 2000.

== Use in sporting events ==
The first use of the song at an American sporting event was at Mississippi State University. The university's mascot is the Bulldog, and the university school first played the song during football games in the fall of 1998 using the version sung by Chuck Smooth. It was accompanied by the crowd singing along and the team performing a dance on the field called "The Dawg Pound Rock" just before a kickoff. Later the Southeastern Conference ruled that they could not perform the dance on the field, so the team moved it to the sidelines. Several other teams followed suit, and the song quickly became a national phenomenon.

In June 2000, Gregg Greene, then Director of Promotions for the Seattle Mariners, was the first to play the Baha Men's version of "Who Let the Dogs Out" at a Major League Baseball game. He debuted the tune as a joke for the team's backup catcher, Joe Oliver. Two days later, shortstop Alex Rodriguez requested the song be used as his walk-up music, and it quickly became the Mariners team anthem. The Baha Men performed the song at Safeco Field during a Mariners game in September 2000. The New York Mets, however, have claimed that they were the first MLB team to adopt the song, to which ESPN humorously commented "This is a little like scientists arguing over who discovered a deadly virus". The Baha Men recorded a version of the song that changed the chorus to "Who let the Mets out?" and all the lyrics to reflect the team and its players, which was played at Shea Stadium throughout the Mets' 2000 postseason run, including a live performance on the Shea Stadium field before Game 4 of the 2000 World Series against the cross-town rival New York Yankees. The song was written by David Brody of Z100 New York and recorded by the Baha Men initially for Z100. Brody then gave the song to the Mets to play at Shea.

In the United Kingdom, the song was quickly appropriated by Liverpool supporters under then-manager Gérard Houllier. Regular chants of 'Hou led the reds out' by Liverpool fans (a reference to Liverpool's cup treble in 2001) were followed soon after by opposition fans' chants of 'Hou had a heart attack' (a reference to Houllier's illness in October 2001).

When the New York Knicks ended their 53-year championship drought by winning the 2026 NBA Finals, head coach Mike Brown celebrated by chanting the song's chorus during the trophy presentation. Later that year, NFL quarterback Jameis Winston used it as part of a hard count during a game between the New York Giants and Washington Commanders.

== Charts ==
=== Weekly charts ===
Chart (2000–2001)	Peak position
Australia (ARIA)	1
Austria (Ö3 Austria Top 40)	26
Belgium (Ultratop 50 Flanders)	7
Belgium (Ultratop 50 Wallonia)	27
Canada Top Singles (RPM)	14
Canada Adult Contemporary (RPM)	36
Canada Dance/Urban (RPM)	21 (Note: "Who Let the Dogs Out" reached number 21 when RPM ceased publication in November 2000.)
Denmark (Tracklisten)	6
Europe (Eurochart Hot 100)	4
Finland (Suomen virallinen lista)	18
France (SNEP)	60
Germany (GfK)	6
Ireland (IRMA)	2
Netherlands (Dutch Top 40)	3
Netherlands (Single Top 100)	4
New Zealand (Recorded Music NZ)	1
Norway (VG-lista)	3
Scottish Singles Sales (Official Charts)	2
Sweden (Sverigetopplistan)	3
Switzerland (Schweizer Hitparade)	6
UK Singles (Official Charts)	2
UK Dance (Official Charts)	16
UK Indie (Official Charts)	1
US Billboard Hot 100	40
US Mainstream Top 40 (Billboard)	18
US Rhythmic Top 40 (Billboard)	22
US Top 40 Tracks (Billboard)	21

=== Year-end charts ===
Chart (2000)	Position
Australia (ARIA)	22
Denmark (IFPI)	38
Europe (Eurochart Hot 100)	83
Ireland (IRMA)	19
Netherlands (Dutch Top 40)	39
Netherlands (Single Top 100)	30
Sweden (Hitlistan)	37
UK Singles (OCC)	4
US Rhythmic Top 40 (Billboard)	72

Chart (2001)	Position
Brazil (Crowley)	84
Europe (Eurochart Hot 100)	33
Germany (Media Control)	53
Sweden (Hitlistan)	44
Switzerland (Schweizer Hitparade)	48
UK Singles (OCC)	148
US Maxi-Singles Sales (Billboard)	24

== Certifications ==
Region	Certification	Certified units/sales
Australia (ARIA)	Platinum	70,000^{^}
Belgium (BRMA)	Gold	25,000^{*}
Denmark	—	4,284
Germany (BVMI)	Gold	250,000^{^}
Netherlands (NVPI)	Gold	40,000^{^}
New Zealand (RMNZ)	Platinum	30,000^{‡}
Sweden (GLF)	Platinum	30,000^{^}
United Kingdom (BPI)	Platinum	715,000
^{*} Sales figures based on certification alone.^{^} Shipments figures based on certification alone.^{‡} Sales+streaming figures based on certification alone.
