= Baha Men =

Bahamian junkanoo band

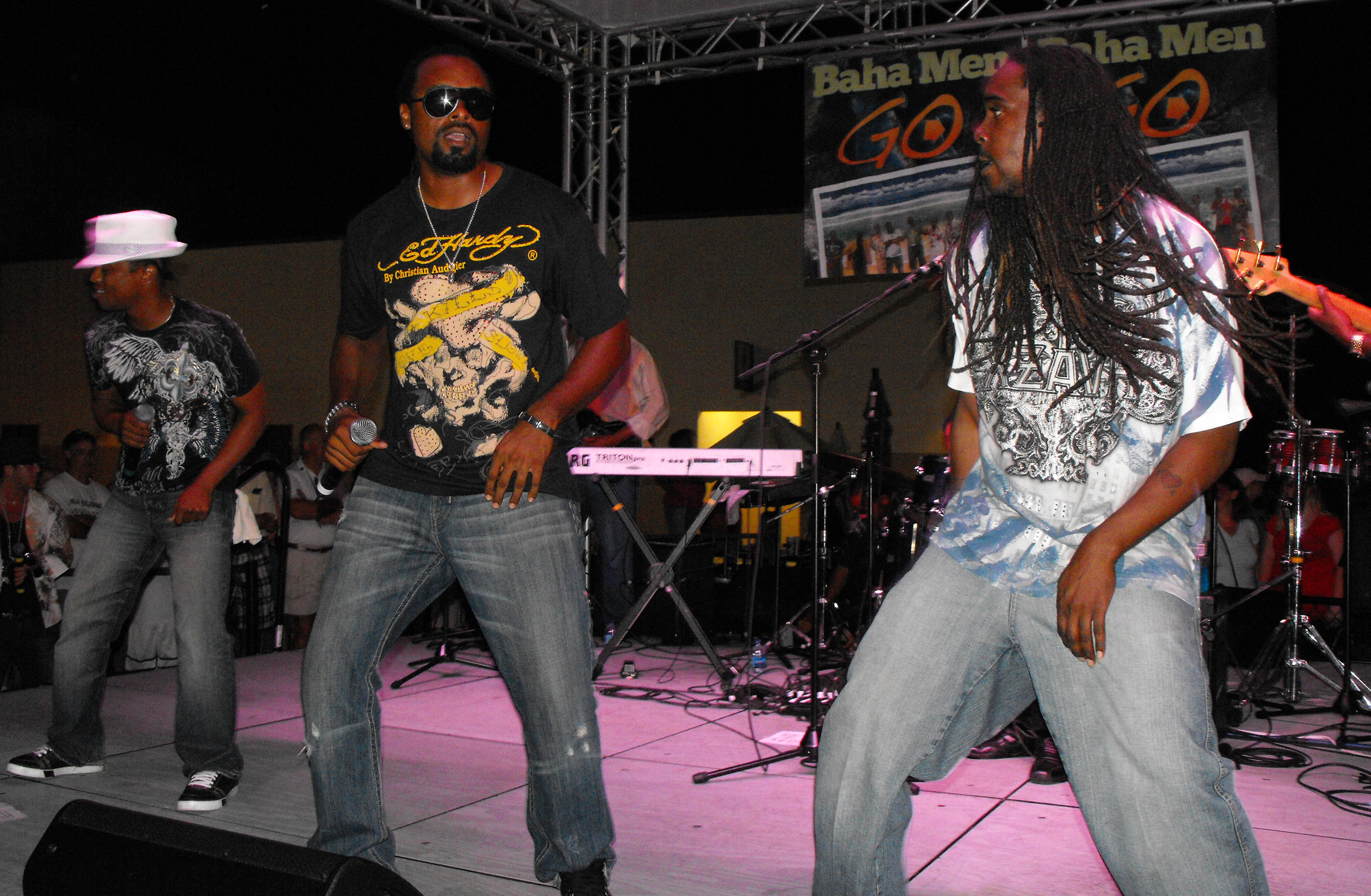
- Baha Men performing in June 2010

Background information
- Also known as: High Voltage; The Baha Boys
- Origin: New Providence, the Bahamas
- Genres: Junkanoo; dance; pop; reggae fusion; hip-hop
- Years active: 1977–present
- Labels: EMI; S-Curve; Capitol Records; Sony Music Entertainment/Latin America; Rough Trade Records
- Members: Pat Carey; Rik Carey; Jeffrey Chea; Anthony Flowers; Colyn Grant; Nehemiah Hield; Omerit Hield; Dyson Knight; Marvin Prosper; Herschel Small; Isaiah Taylor; James Tyler

Baha Men are a Bahamian junkanoo band formed in New Providence, Bahamas, in 1977. They are best known for their Grammy Award–winning hit song "Who Let the Dogs Out".

== History ==
=== Early years ===
Baha Men formed in 1977 as High Voltage, initially playing disco and funk. They performed regularly in nightclubs and hotels in the Bahamas and self-released several albums.

In 1991, one of their tapes found its way to Atlantic Records A&R man Steve Greenberg, who signed the band to the Big Beat subsidiary, at the same time getting the band to change their name to the Baha Men.

=== Early success ===
The following year, Baha Men released their first album, Junkanoo, which included the local hit "Back to the Island". Kalik followed in 1994, including the international hit "Dancing in the Moonlight". The band moved with Greenberg to Polygram for the 1997 album I Like What I Like and Doong Spank, released the following year. The latter sold only 700 copies in the US and the band was dropped by the label.

Greenberg then started his own label, S-Curve, and signed the band. Original vocalist Nehemiah Hield left in 1999, and was replaced by his nephew Omerit. The band was most popular in the 1990s in Japan, and their 1999 album 2 Zero 0-0 was initially released only in that country.

=== "Who Let the Dogs Out" ===
They achieved great, but short-lived, popularity with a 2000s remake of "Who Let the Dogs Out" (originally composed by Anslem Douglas), produced by Greenberg and Michael Mangini. The song was a chart success in many countries and also became a popular song at US sporting events. "Who Let the Dogs Out" also earned the band several awards: a Grammy Award in 2001 for Best Dance Recording; Billboard Music Awards for World Music Artist of the Year and World Music Album of the Year; and a Nickelodeon Kids Choice Award for Favorite Song. In 2002, they won another Kids' Choice Award for Favorite Band.

In June 2008, "Who Let the Dogs Out" was discussed on I Love the New Millennium. The Baha Men's most recent album was Ride With Me, released in 2015.

=== Recent years ===
After releasing Night & Day in the summer of 2014 for the FIFA World Cup that year in Brazil and was featured in the soundtrack: One Love, One Rhythm – The 2014 FIFA World Cup Official Album in the Carnival Mix, the Baha Men released a Christmas Medley mixing "The Little Drummer Boy" with "Silver Bells". Their single "Off the Leash" was released digitally on 1 July 2015. On 25 October 2015, the band performed the halftime show for the New York Giants/Dallas Cowboys football game at MetLife Stadium.

In 2018, the group joined Our Last Night for a metal cover of their hit song "Who Let the Dogs Out" and, in April 2019, released a new single, "Let's Go", dedicated to the teams playing in the Final Four.

== TV and film appearances ==
Baha Men appeared in a special scene from Between the Lions where Leona and Theo meet them while reading some books inside the library.

They performed the theme song of the Playhouse Disney series Stanley, titled "My Man Stanley".

Their track "Rat Race" appeared in the opening scene of the 2001 film Rat Race.

Their track "Coconut" appeared in an episode of the Nickelodeon series ChalkZone, which also featured a parodied version of the band.

They performed onstage for a Season 14 episode of The Bachelorette, which took place in the Bahamas.

Their track "Who Let The Dogs Out" appeared in the 2000 film Rugrats in Paris: The Movie during the scene where Spike escapes the hotel room.

Their track "Holla!" appeared in the opening and closing credits of Garfield: The Movie, and during one scene in the 2005 film Kicking & Screaming.

Their track "Best Years of Our Lives" appeared in the rolling credits of Shrek.

Their track "Crocodile Rock" appeared in the rolling credits of The Crocodile Hunter: Collision Course.

Their track "Scooby D" appeared in Scooby-Doo.

The band made an appearance on the big screen, when they starred as themselves in the 1994 romantic comedy My Father the Hero, starring Gérard Depardieu and Katherine Heigl.

The Baha Men and their song "Who Let the Dogs Out" was used heavily by Zach Zucker during his solo stand-up comedy show, Jack Tucker: Comedy Standup Hour. The bit, which has repeatedly gone viral on TikTok, references the number of members in the Baha Men and how that number as well as the names of individual members is not common knowledge. Dyson Knight, a member of the Baha Men, made a cameo in the official special, Jack Tucker: Comedy Standup Hour, on the Stamptown YouTube channel.

== Members ==
- Pat Carey - guitar
- Rik Carey - drums
- Jeffrey Chea - keyboards
- Anthony Flowers - percussion
- Colyn Grant - drums
- Nehemiah Hield
- Omerit Hield
- Dyson Knight - vocals
- Marvin Prosper - vocals
- Herschel Small - guitar
- Isaiah Taylor - percussion

== Discography ==
=== Studio albums ===
List of albums, with selected chart positions
Title	Album details	Peak chart positions		Certifications
Title	Album details	AUS	US	Certifications
Electrifying (as High Voltage)	Released: 1985; Label: Self-released; Format: CD, cassette	—	—	
High Voltage (as High Voltage)	Released: 1987; Label: Self-released; Format: CD, cassette	—	—	
Junkanoo	Released: 29 September 1992; Label: Big Beat; Format: CD, cassette	—	—	
Kalik	Released: 6 September 1994; Label: Atlantic; Format: CD, cassette	—	—	
I Like What I Like	Released: 10 June 1997; Label: Mercury; Format: CD, cassette	—	—	
Doong Spank	Released: 16 June 1998; Label: Mercury; Format: CD, cassette	—	—	
2 Zero 0-0	Released: 25 May 1999; Label: Mercury (Japan); Format: CD, digital download	—	—	
Who Let the Dogs Out	Released: 25 July 2000; Label: S-Curve; Format: CD, cassette, digital download	16	5	RIAA: 3× Platinum; ARIA: Gold
Move It Like This	Released: 26 March 2002; Label: S-Curve; Format: CD, digital download	—	57	
Holla!	Released: 1 June 2004; Label: S-Curve; Format: CD, digital download	—	—	
Ride with Me	Released: 9 October 2015; Label: Sony Music Latin; Format: Digital download	—	—	

=== Compilation albums ===
List of albums, with selected chart positions
Title	Album details	Peak chart positions
Title	Album details	US World
Greatest Movie Hits	Released: 5 November 2002; Label: Capitol; Format: CD, digital download	1
10 Great Songs: Who Let the Dogs Out	Released: 10 September 2010; Label: Capitol; Format: CD, digital download	4

=== Singles ===
Year	Single	Peak chart positions									Certifications (sales threshold)	Album
Year	Single	AUS	AUT	CAN	GER	NZ	SWI	SWE	UK	US	Certifications (sales threshold)	Album
1994	"Dancing in the Moonlight"	—	—	42	—	18	—	—	—	—		Kalik
1995	"(Just a) Sunny Day"	—	—	—	—	38	—	—	—	—		Kalik
1997	"That's the Way I Get Down"	—	—	—	—	—	—	—	—	—		I Like What I Like
2000	"Who Let the Dogs Out"	1	26	14	6	1	6	3	2	40	ARIA: Platinum; BPI: Platinum	Who Let the Dogs Out
2001	"You All Dat"	8	59	—	62	21	86	49	14	94	ARIA: Platinum	Who Let the Dogs Out
2001	"Best Years of Our Lives"	49	66	—	—	—	70	—	—	—		Move It Like This
2002	"Move It Like This"	76	—	13	76	11	65	—	16	—		Move It Like This
2002	"We Rubbin'"	—	—	—	—	—	—	—	—	—		Move It Like This
2011	"Go!"	—	—	—	—	—	—	—	—	—		Non-album single
"—" denotes releases that did not chart or were not released to that country
