= Junkanoo =

Festive season that occurs on Boxing Day and New Year's Day

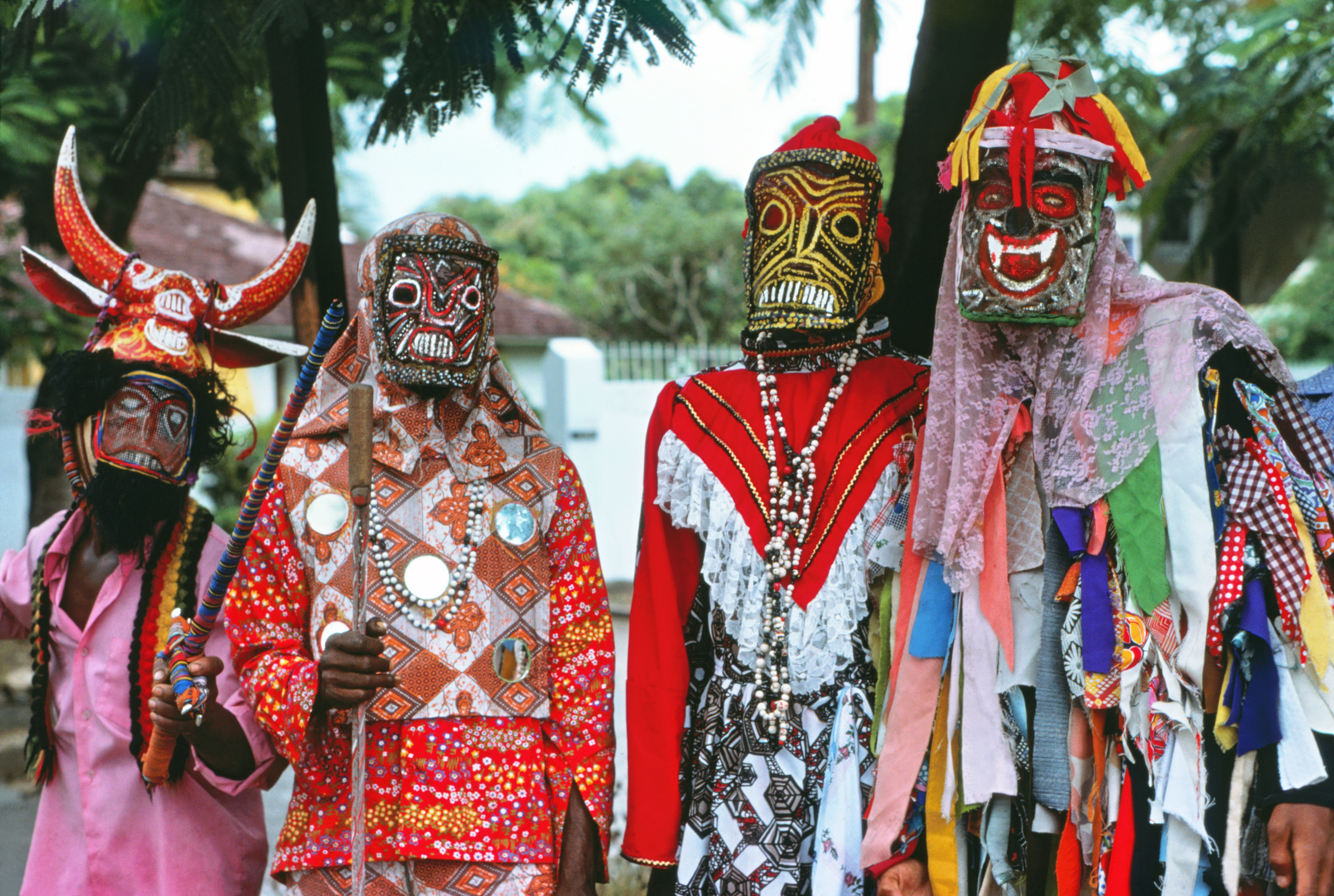
- Junkanoo (or "John Canoe") celebrants (Kingston, Jamaica, Christmas 1975)
- Status: Active
- Genre: Folk festival, street festival, parade
- Country: Caribbean

Junkanoo
- UNESCO Intangible Cultural Heritage
- Country: The Bahamas
- Reference: 01988
- Region: Latin America and the Caribbean

Inscription history
- Inscription: 2023 (18th session)
- List: Representative

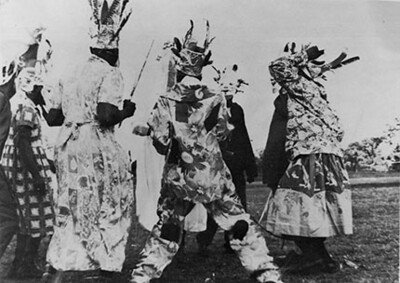
Jonkunnu in Jamaica

Junkanoo (also Jonkonnu, John Canoe) is a festival that originated during the period of African chattel slavery in British American colonies. It is practiced most notably today in The Bahamas, Jamaica and Belize, and historically in North Carolina and Miami, where there have been significant settlements of West Indian people during the post-emancipation era. In the present day, there are considerable variations in performance and spelling of the festival, but the shared elements of masquerade (or masking), drumming, dance, and parading continue.

In many territories, Junkanoo is observed around the week of Christmas. These Christmas-time parades are predominantly showcased in Jamaica. In The Bahamas, it was initially called Junkanoo and is said to date back to the 1700s. There it is celebrated year round. In Belize, where the music is mainstreamed, competition results are hotly contested. In the state of Florida, Junkanoo parades take place in Miami in June and in Key West in October, locales that have black populations including those with roots in the Caribbean.

== Origins ==
The festival is believed to have begun in The Bahamas; however, evidence shows that Junkanoo's origins point strongly to Jamaica and that it later spread throughout the Caribbean as early as the 18th century. Though stemming from the same origin, celebrations have been localized by different countries and, over time, evolved to be somewhat different.

This tradition is one of the oldest dance celebrations in Jamaica. In addition to being a cultural dance of the Garifuna people of Belize and various islands, this type of dancing is also performed in The Bahamas on their independence day and other historical holidays.

Historically, Junkanoo parades took place among black people in southeastern North Carolina and can be traced back to Jamaican roots. The custom had included disguised mocking of slave holders, and it became less popular after slavery was abolished. The last known Junkanoo celebration in the Southern United States was in Wilmington, North Carolina, in the late 1880s.

Dances are choreographed to the beat of goatskin drums and cowbells.

== Etymology ==
The origin of the word "junkanoo" is disputed. Theories include that it is named after a folk hero named John Canoe, or that it is derived from the French term gens inconnus (unknown people), as the revellers wear masks. Variations include jonkonnu, jankunu or jonkunnu.

== History ==
The festival may have originated several centuries ago when enslaved Africans or their descendants, on the plantations in Jamaica, celebrated holidays granted around Christmastime. This was done with dance, music (drumming), and costumes. The costumes and drumming used in celebration in Jamaica show strong similarities to West African mask dances, blended with European culture.

Evidence suggests that the origin of this Jamaican tradition is likely to be Akan. Similarities can possibly be found in three other "groups" of West African festival traditions. These are:

- the annual New Yam Festival of the Mmo secret society of the Igbo peoples
- the Egungun masquerades of the Yoruba people, and
- the Homowo yam festival of the Ga people

The tradition continued in countries like Jamaica after emancipation. Junkanoo evolved far from simple origins to a formal, organized parade with intricate costumes, themed music and official prizes within various categories in The Bahamas.

Douglas Chambers, professor of African studies at the University of Southern Mississippi, suggests a possible Igbo origin from the Igbo yam deity Njoku Ji, referencing festivities in time for the New Yam Festival. Chambers also suggests a link with the Igbo okonko masking tradition of southern Igboland, which features horned maskers and other masked characters, similar to junkanoo masks.

Similarities with the Yoruba Egungun festivals have also been identified. However, an Akan origin is more likely because the celebration of the Fancy Dress Festivals/Masquerades are during the same time (Christmas week, 25 December – 1 January) in the Central and Western Regions of Ghana. In addition, John Canoe was an existing Ahanta chief and an Akan warrior hero that ruled Axim, Ghana before 1720, the same year the John Canoe festival was created in the Caribbean. Jeroen Dewulf pointed out, the term may have had a religious dimension, relating to the Akan deity Nyankompong (in today's spelling), who was known in eighteenth-century English sources as John Company.

According to Edward Long, an 18th-century Jamaican enslaver/historian, the John Canoe festival was created in Jamaica and the Caribbean by enslaved Akan who backed the man known as John Canoe. Canoe was an ally soldier for the Germans until he turned his back on them for his Ahanta people, siding with the Asante, Nzema, Wassa and others in an alliance called Kotoko (another name for the Asante state), to take the area from the Germans and other Europeans. The news of his victory reached Jamaica, and he has been celebrated ever since the Christmas of 1708 when he first defeated Prussian forces for Axim. Twenty years later, his stronghold was broken by neighbouring Fante forces, aided by the military might of the British.

Ahanta and other Asante Kotoko captives were taken to Jamaica as prisoners of war. The festival itself includes motifs from battles typical of Akan fashion. The many war masks and dance formations of the Ahanta people became part of this celebration worldwide, especially in the Caribbean. The elaborate masks and attire resemble Akan battledress with charms, referred to as a Batakari

== Description ==
Junkanoo has been prominent and celebrated in colonies such as Jamaica (as Jankunu, Jonkonnu or Jonkunnu), The Bahamas (as Junkanoo), and North Carolina.

Historian Stephen Nissenbaum described the festival as it was performed in 19th-century North Carolina:

Essentially, it involved a band of black men—generally young—who dressed themselves in ornate and often bizarre costumes. Each band was led by a man who was variously dressed in animal horns, elaborate rags, female disguise, whiteface (and wearing a gentleman's wig!), or simply his "Sunday-go-to-meeting-suit." Accompanied by music, the band marched along the roads from plantation to plantation and town to town, accosting whites and sometimes even entering their houses. In the process, the men performed elaborate and (to white observers) grotesque dances that were probably of African origin. In return for this performance, they always demanded money (the leader generally carried "a small bowl or tin cup" for this purpose), though whiskey was an acceptable substitute.

== Characters ==
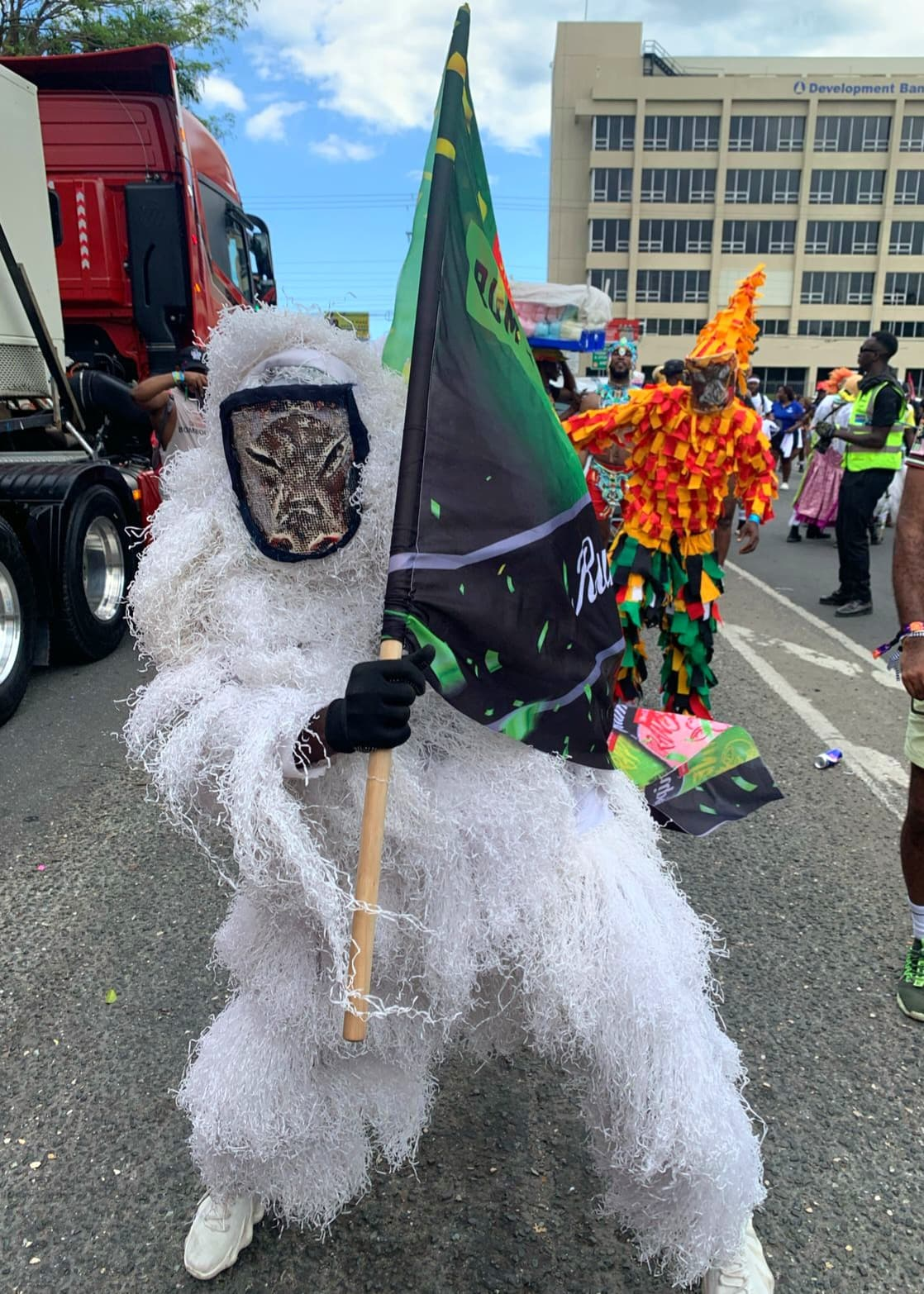
A few Jonkunnu characters at Jamaica Carnival, in Kingston.

Traditionally, Junkanoo entails a band of masqueraders with the following characters:

- The King and Queen— prominent characters representing European royalty. They usually wear elaborate costumes with shiny materials and crowns.
- Pitchy Patchy— a main character in Jamaican Jonkonnu, whose role is to keep masqueraders and the surrounding crowd of spectators in order, by cracking a cattle whip. Pitchy Patchy is often depicted in a suit made of colourful, tattered pieces of cloth.
- Belly Woman— a humorous character with a large belly, representing fertility and abundance. Belly Woman is usually a male performer who plays the role of a pregnant lady.
- Horse Head— a character often seen with a horse head/skull costume.
- Cow Head— a character often seen with a cow head costume including long horns, and is sometimes seen on stilts.
- The Red Indians / Wild Apache Indians— common characters that depict Native Americans or Amerindians. They often wear beads, mirrors and feathers.
- The Devil— a prominent character that represents evil in the world, whose appearance is scary and mischievous. The Devil's costume includes a pitchfork and tail.
- The Red-Set Girls— backup dancers to the rest of the characters, who wear flamboyant dresses.
- House Head— a character often depicted as a house/building, carried on the head by a performer, which symbolizes the hope for a better future.
- The Bride and Groom— characters dressed like a typical bride and groom.
- Jack in the Green— a man covered with green foliage.
- Policeman— a character dressed in a police costume.
- Warrior— a character dressed like a warrior, sometimes seen with a wooden sword painted silver.

== Popular culture ==
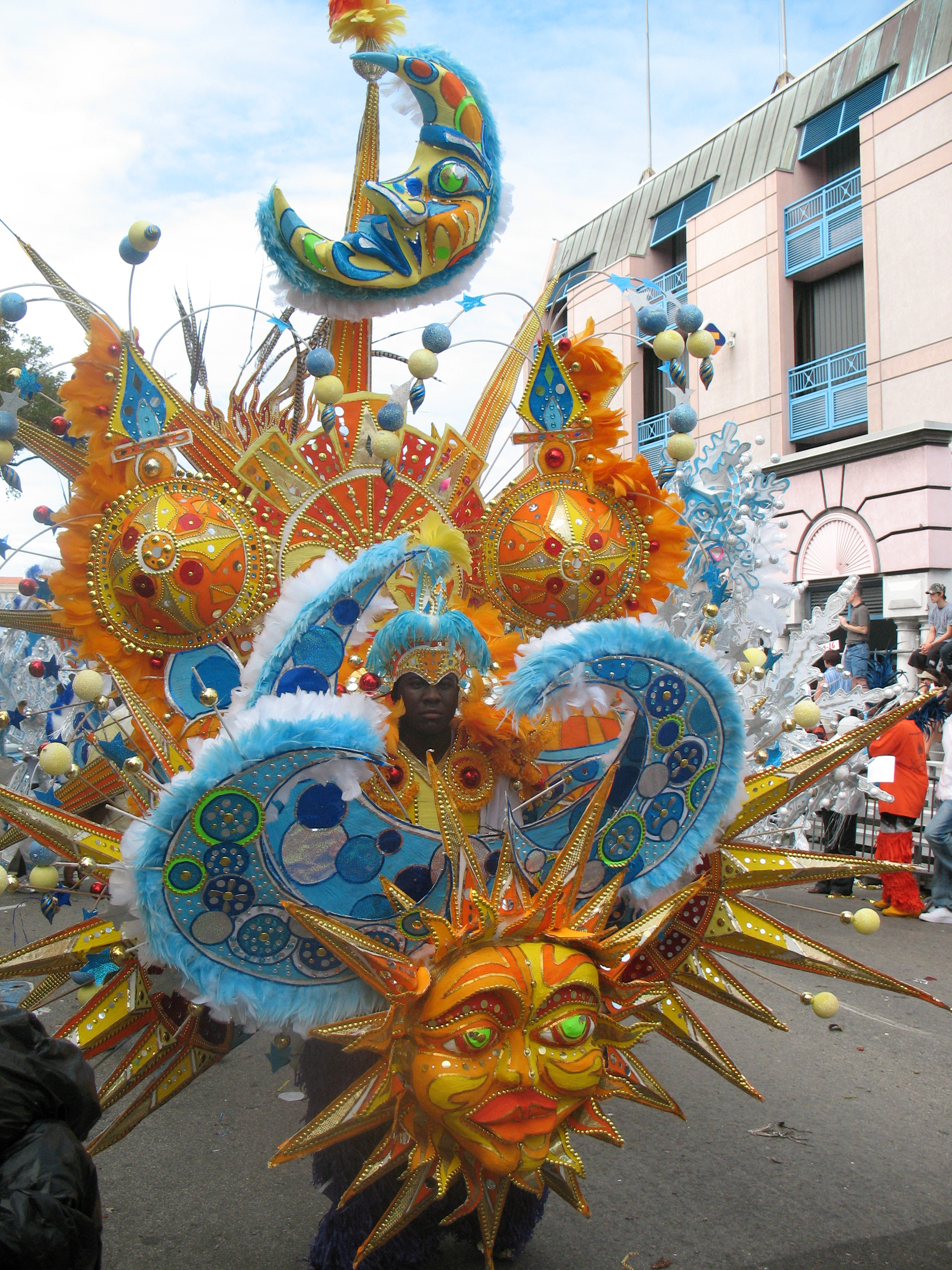
Example of Junkanoo costume December 2007

The Junkanoo parade has been featured in movies, such as the James Bond film Thunderball (erroneously described as a local Mardi Gras-type festival), After the Sunset, and Jaws The Revenge. It was also in the season one episode, Calderone's Return (Part II), of the 1984 television series Miami Vice, taking place on the fictitious island of St. Andrews.

A song titled "Junkanoo Holiday (Fallin'-Flyin')" was written by Kenny Loggins and is featured on his 1979 album Keep The Fire. This song immediately follows the hit song, "This Is It," on the album. "This Is It" has a fade ending that segues into "Junkanoo Holiday (Fallin'-Flyin')", omitting a complete break between the two songs.

In the thirteenth episode of the television show Top Chef: All-Stars, "Fit for a King", the contestants danced at a Junkanoo parade, learned about its history, and competed to make the best dish for the Junkanoo King.

The post-Covid return to Junkanoo was briefly discussed across the two-part episodes 189 and 190 of Nicole Byer and Sasheer Zamata's podcast, Best Friends, documenting their trip to The Bahamas.

== Gallery ==
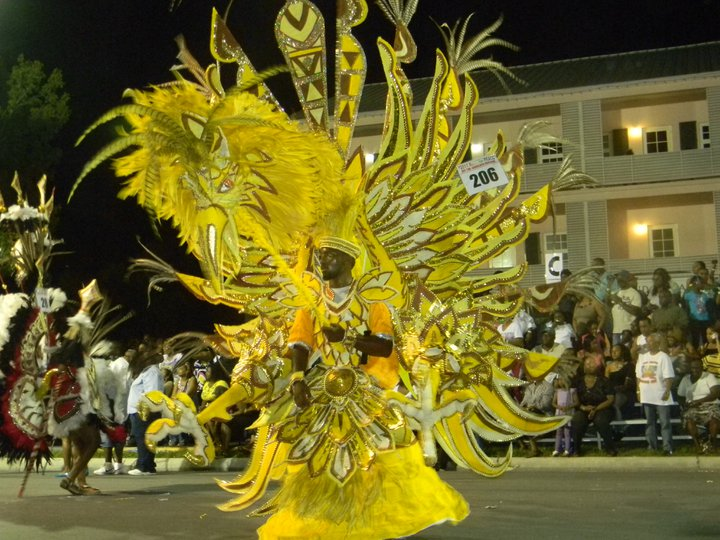
Rush for Peace (Freeport, Bahamas, 2011)

Costume sans participant after the parade

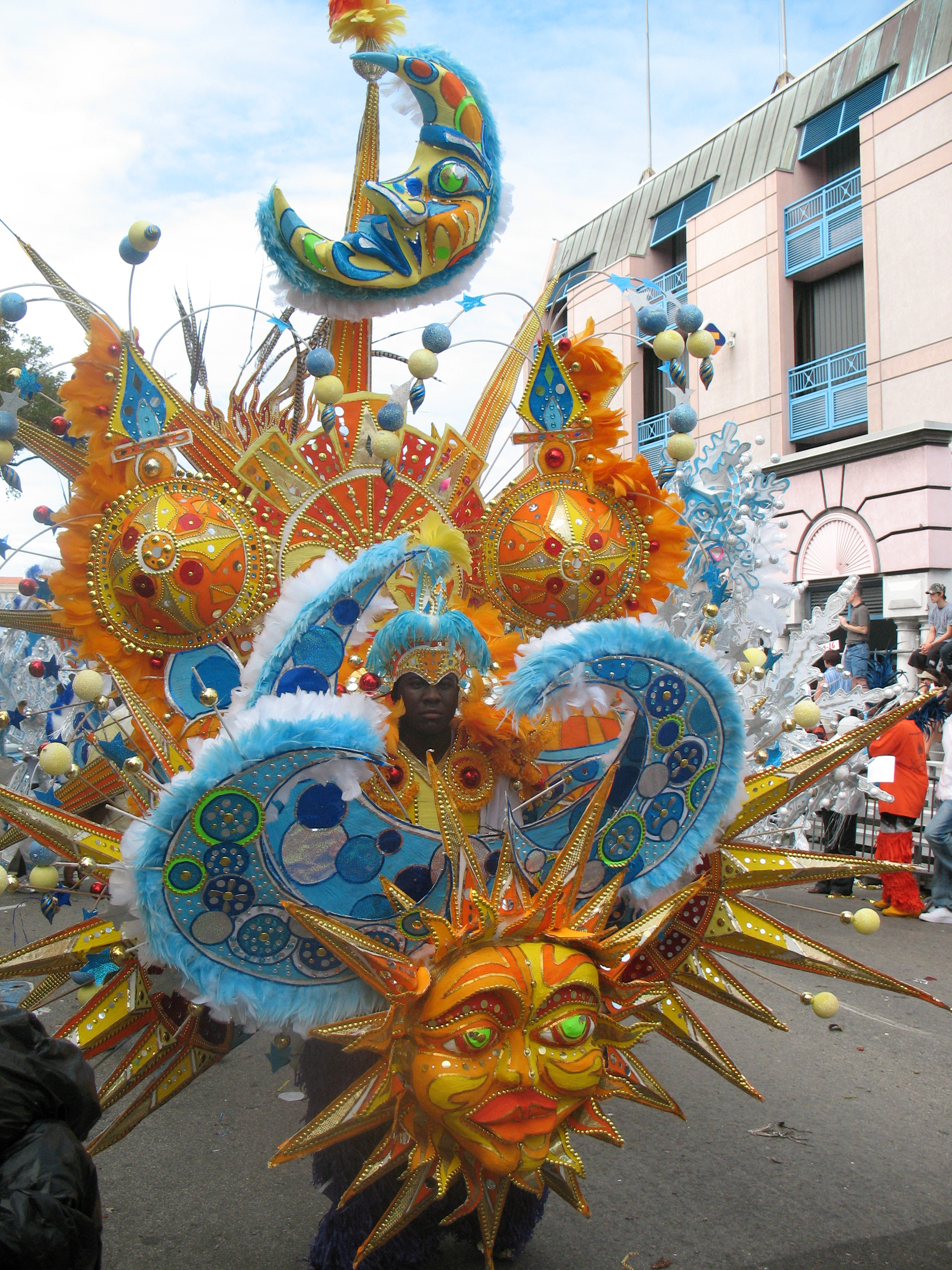
Junkanoo costume

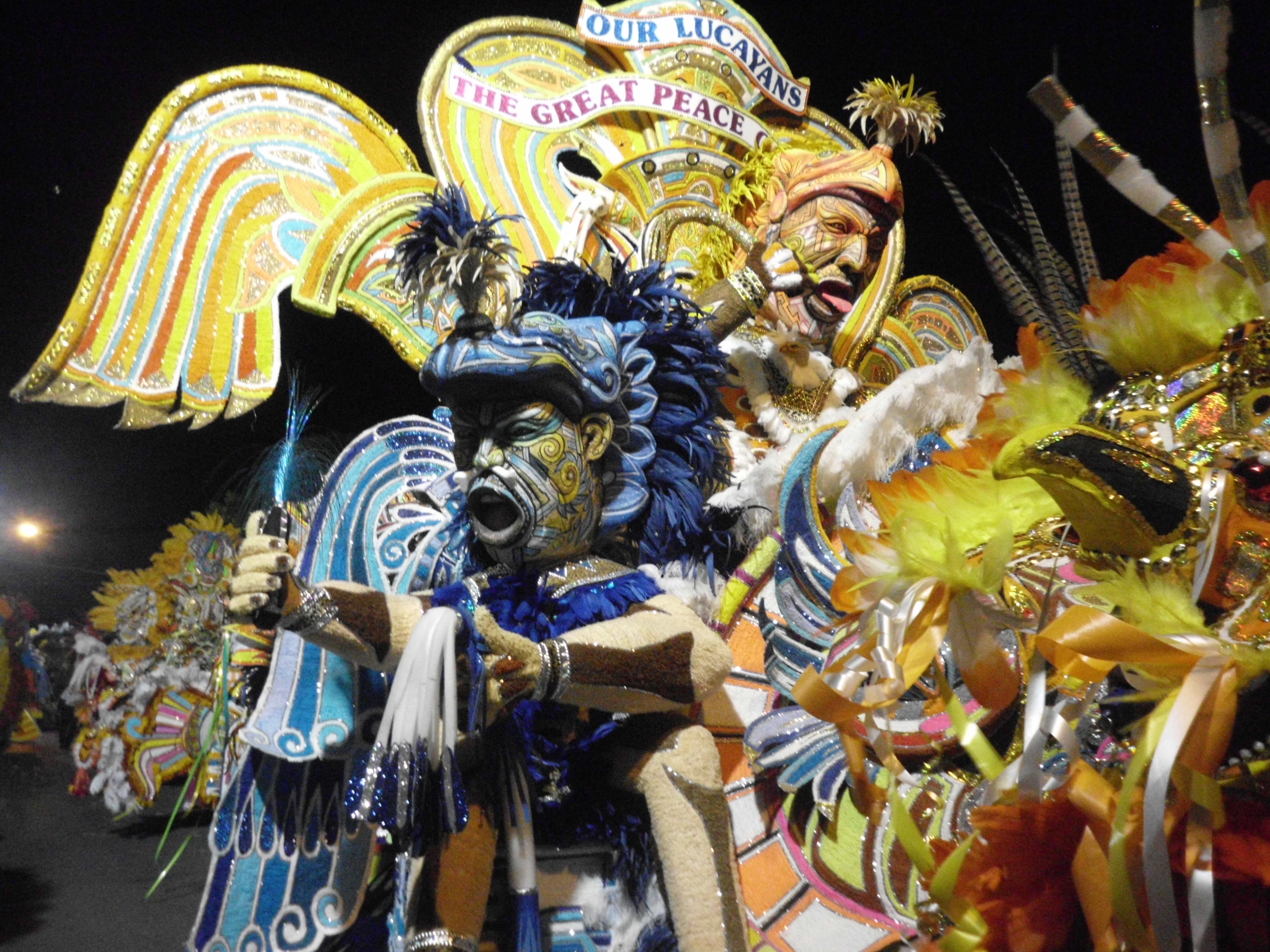
Junkanoo costume

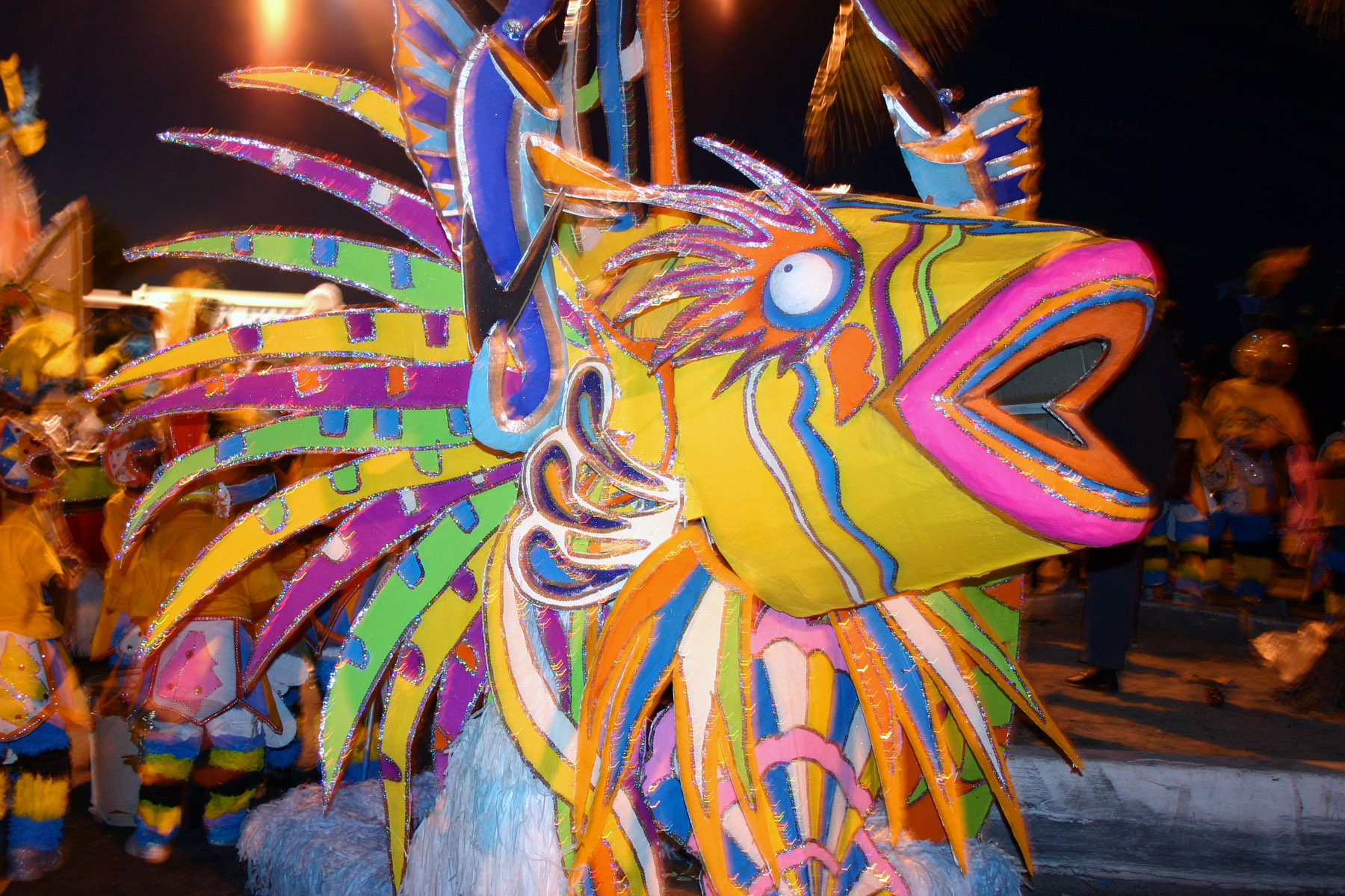
Junkanoo Festival, Nassau 2005

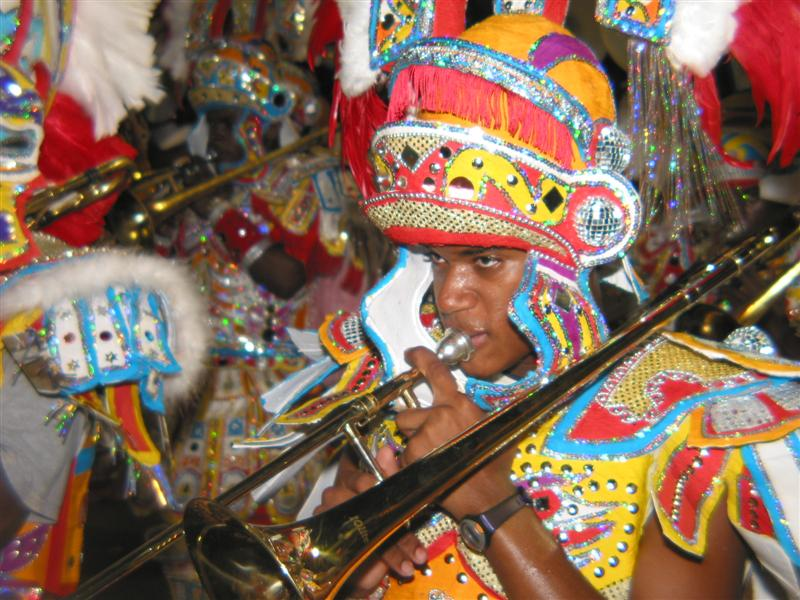
Junkanoo musician 2005

== See also ==
- Pitchy patchy
- John Canoe, the 1708 king of Axim, after whom the practice may have been named
