= David Jaymes =

- Born: 28 November 1954 (age 71); Woodford, Essex, England
- Origin: England
- Genres: Pop, salsa, dance, R&B, mambo, electronic, Afro-Cuban, blues, soul, disco, punk rock, new wave
- Occupations: Vocalist, composer, musician, music management
- Instruments: Bass guitar, vocals
- Years active: 1976–present
- Labels: Small Wonder Records, Chrysalis Records, WEA, Ronco Records, RCA Records, President Records
- Formerly of: Leyton Buzzards; Modern Romance

David Jaymes (born 28 December 1954) is an English musician and songwriter best known as the founder member of the Leyton Buzzards (1976–1980) and the multi-hit salsa band Modern Romance (1980–1985). He now works in music management and consultancy.

== The Leyton Buzzards (1976–1980) ==
Jaymes formed the punk rock/new wave band, the Leyton Buzzards, in 1976. He was the band's bass player and also provided vocals. Other members included Geoff Deane (lead vocals), Vernon Austin (guitar and vocals), Kevin Steptoe (drums), and later, Tony Gainsborough (drums). Milton Reame-James – formerly of Steve Harley & Cockney Rebel played keyboards. In 1979 they won the Battle of the Bands competition organised by BBC Radio 1 and The Sun newspaper. This led to a record deal with Chrysalis Records and an appearance on Top of the Pops. Their first single with Chrysalis was a minor hit titled "Saturday Night (Beneath the Plastic Palm Trees)". The single "We Make A Noise" was produced by Chas Chandler, and the vinyl cover artwork designed by Terry Gilliam. Jaymes recorded four sessions with the band for BBC Radio One's John Peel between July 1978 and January 1980. After a run of singles – including a cover version of "Can't Get Used to Losing You" – and the album, Jellied Eels to Record Deals, the Buzzards disbanded.

== Modern Romance (1980–1985) ==
Jaymes formed the band Modern Romance with Geoff Deane (lead vocals) and Tony Gainsborough (drums) of The Leyton Buzzards, his brother Robbie Jaymes (keyboards), and Paul Gendler (guitars). Later members included Michael J. Mullins (lead vocals), Andy Kyriacou (drums) and John Du Prez (trumpets). Modern Romance were predominantly known for their Latin American music and salsa music sound; they produced a string of hits, including "Everybody Salsa" (1981), "Ay Ay Ay Ay Moosey" (1981), "Queen of the Rapping Scene (Nothing Ever Goes the Way You Plan)" (1982), a cover version of "Cherry Pink and Apple Blossom White" (1982), "Best Years of Our Lives" (1982), "High Life" (1983), "Don't Stop That Crazy Rhythm" (1983), and "Walking in the Rain" (1983). Two successful albums in the UK – Trick of the Light and Party Tonight – and a host of TV and magazine appearances, made 1983 the band's watershed year.

== Music manager and consultant ==
Jaymes has since moved into the management and consultancy side of the business. Over the years he has managed artists such as Sinéad O'Connor, Justin Adams, Miles Hunt aka The Wonder Stuff, Republica, and Drum Club. He has acted as consultant for the likes of Harry Nilsson, Jimmy Webb, George Fenton, and Chuck Mangione. He worked with a host of musicians on the Haiti earthquake disaster single, a cover version of "I Put a Spell on You" (2010); artists included Shane MacGowan, Nick Cave, Chrissie Hynde, and Johnny Depp. He has contributed as songwriter to the movie Shrek (2001) and as music supervisor on the film, Fascination (2004).

== Haiti earthquake disaster single (2010) ==
In 2010, Shane MacGowan and his wife, Victoria Clarke, rounded up a number of rock musicians to record a cover version of the Screamin' Jay Hawkins song, "I Put a Spell on You", the proceeds going to the 2010 earthquake disaster fund. However, at the last minute, the record label pulled out and that was when Jaymes and Tom Haxell of IRL Records jumped in. They immediately offered their studio in London and hooked up Johnny Depp – who was filming in Los Angeles at the time – to record his guitar solo and music video footage.

The musicians:

- Vocals:
  Shane MacGowan
  Nick Cave
  Bobby Gillespie
  Glen Matlock
  Chrissie Hynde
  Paloma Faith
  Eliza Doolittle
  Laura White
- Guitar:
  James Walbourne
  Mick Jones
  Johnny Depp
- Bass:
  Cait O'Riordan
- Hammond organ/piano:
  Carwyn Ellis
- Drums:
  Rob Walbourne
- Fire Hydrant:
  Mick Jones

== Discography ==
=== Singles ===
- "19 and Mad" (1978) Small Wonder
- "Saturday Night (Beneath the Plastic Palm Trees)" (1979) Chrysalis (UK number 53)
- "I'm Hanging Around" (1979) Chrysalis b/w "No Dry Ice" or "Flying Pigs"
- "We Make a Noise" (1979) Chrysalis (as The Buzzards)
- "Can't Get Used to Losing You" (1980) WEA

=== Albums ===
- Jellied Eels to Record Deals (1979) Chrysalis (as The Buzzards)
- The Punk Collection: Leyton Buzzards (2003) Captain Oi! Ahoy (as Leyton Buzzards)

=== Singles (Jaymes / Deane era) ===
- "Modern Romance" b/w "I Believe in Me" (1980)
- "Tonight" b/w "Fever" (1981)
- "Everybody Salsa" b/w "Salsa Rappsody" (1981) (UK number 12)
- "Ay Ay Ay Ay Moosey" b/w "Moose on the Loose" (1981) (UK number 10)
- "Can You Move" b/w "Queen of the Rapping Scene" (1981) (US Dance Chart number 2)
- "Queen of the Rapping Scene (Nothing Ever Goes the Way You Plan)" b/w "Can You Move" [American Mix] (1981) (UK number 37)
- "By the Way... (I'm Still in Love with You)" b/w "By the Way" (Trumpet Voluntary) (1982)
- "Cherry Pink and Apple Blossom White" b/w "Who is John Du Prez?" (1982) (UK number 15)

=== Singles (Jaymes / Mullins era) ===
- "Best Years of Our Lives" b/w "We've Got Them Running (The Counting Song)" (1982) – (UK number 4)
- "Band of Gold" b/w "The Man Who Sold The World" (By Midge Ure) (1982) (From the Party Party Soundtrack)
- "High Life" b/w "You Just Can't Kill the Beat" (1983) (UK number 8)
- "Don't Stop That Crazy Rhythm" b/w "I Can't Help Myself" (1983) (UK number 14)
- "Walking in the Rain" b/w "Walking in the Rain (Blues)" (1983) (UK number 7) (Thailand number 1)
- "Good Friday" b/w "Good Feelings" [re-mix] (1983) (UK number 96)
- "Juanita" b/w "Cherry Pink and Apple Blossom White" [New Version] [Japan] (1983)
- "Just My Imagination" b/w "Stranger Days" (1984)
- "Burn It!" b/w "Burn It!" [Instrumental] (1984)
- "Move On" b/w "That's Entertainment" (1984)
- "That's What Friends Are For" b/w "(Blame My) Jealousy" (1984)
- "Tarzan Boy" b/w "Sail Away" (1985)
- "Best Mix of Our Lives" b/w "Best Year of Our Lives" [remix] (1985) (UK number 81)

=== Albums ===
- Adventures in Clubland (1981)

† Adventures in Clubland (Venezuela number 1) [Certified Gold]

- Modern Romance (1982) (Germany)
- Trick of the Light (1983) UK number 53
- Party Tonight (1983) UK number 45
- Juanita (1983) Japan
- Burn It! (1985)
- Back on Track (2002) Credited as Songwriter
- Moves 2 Fast (2002) Credited as Songwriter
- Modern Romance: The Platinum Collection' (2006)

=== Solo singles ===
- "Everybody Salsa" / "Can You Move" b/w "Best Years of Our Lives Parts 1 & 2" (1988 Remix)

† (as David Jaymes) President Records

=== Peel sessions ===
- 26 July 1978 (with Leyton Buzzards)
- 18 December 1978 (with Leyton Buzzards)
- 6 June 1979 (with Leyton Buzzards)
- 14 January 1980 (with Leyton Buzzards)

=== Soundtracks ===
- Shrek (2001) writer "Best Years of Our Lives"

== Filmography ==
- Shrek (2001) writer Best Years of Our Lives
- Fascination (2004) music supervisor: Spirit Music and Media

=== Videos ===
- "Ay Ay Ay Ay Moosey" – Official Video (1981)
- "Ay Ay Ay Ay Moosey" – Top of the Pops (1981)
- "Best Years of Our Lives" – Top of the Pops (1982)
- "Cherry Pink and Apple Blossom White" – Top of the Pops (1982)
- "Don't Stop That Crazy Rhythm" – Official Video (1983)
- "Don't Stop That Crazy Rhythm" – Top of the Pops (1983)
- "Everybody Salsa" – Top of the Pops (1981)
- "Good Friday" – Supersonic Christmas Special (1983)
- "High Life" – Unknown Venue (1983)
- "Queen of the Rapping Scene" – Top of the Pops (1982)
- "Walking in the Rain" – Top of the Pops (1983)
- "Walking in the Rain" – Official Video (1983)
- "Walking in the Rain" – Top of the Pops (1983)
- David Jaymes (of Modern Romance) – Tiswas (1982)
- "I Put A Spell on You" – IRL Records (Studio), London (2010)
