= Michael J. Mullins =

- Also known as: Mick Mullins
- Born: 9 November 1953 (age 72)
- Origin: England
- Genres: Pop, salsa
- Occupations: Singer, songwriter
- Instrument: Vocals
- Years active: 1982–present
- Labels: RCA Records, Ronco, WEA, Jive Records

Michael J. Mullins (born Michael John Mullins on 9 November 1953) is an English vocalist and songwriter, best known as the lead singer of salsa band Modern Romance (1982–85). Modern Romance achieved eight top 40 singles and two hit albums. After the band called it quits in 1985, Mullins continued working within the music industry, most notably as a backing singer for Cliff Richard. He can be seen singing with Cliff Richard live on Top of the Pops and on the Christmas number one single "Mistletoe and Wine" (1988). Mullins has since performed with Alan Parsons as part of The Alan Parsons Project.

== Early music (1981–82) ==
Mullins began his music career as a backing vocalist and musician for Modern Romance. He is thanked for providing the vocals and guitar of their debut album, Adventures in Clubland (1981). During this time he also appeared with the band on episodes of Top of the Pops, and provided further vocals on their single "By the Way (I'm Still in Love with You)" (1982). The lead singer for Modern Romance was, at the time, Geoff Deane, who had formed the band with David Jaymes, two remnants of punk rock band The Leighton Buzzards. Modern Romance had reached No. 1 in Venezuela with Adventures in Clubland – which also earned them a Gold Disc there – and had scored four UK hits, Mullins often lending his vocals and talents as a musician to their live TV appearances and studio work. However, in 1982, Deane would leave the band to pursue a solo career.

== Modern Romance (1982–85) ==
Following the departure of Geoff Deane in late 1982, the Jaymes/Deane era came to an end, and Mullins took over as lead vocalist for Modern Romance. Their first single – in what would become known as the Jaymes/Mullins era – climbed the UK charts, reaching the top five. "Best Years of our Lives" – which peaked at No. 4 in the UK – would be the band's highest-charting single. They quickly followed with the similar-sounding single "High Life", which climbed to the No. 8 position. Modern Romance were holding their own with bands such as Duran Duran and Spandau Ballet, and myriad TV and magazine appearances followed. They were regulars on Top of the Pops and made an appearance at the Royal Variety Performance.

Modern Romance subsequently released their second studio album, titled Trick of the Light (1983). It reached No. 53 on the UK Album Chart, and one significant change was the re-recording of the single "Cherry Pink and Apple Blossom White" [New Version] (the new recording of this version was included on both Trick of the Light and Party Tonight) with Mullins lending the song his softer vocals. The album itself has since made it into the Taschen book 1000 Record Covers, which showcases the most interesting and original vinyl cover art from the 1960s to the 1990s (Mullins and David Jaymes grace the front cover of the album). The third single to be taken from Trick of the Light – "Don't Stop That Crazy Rhythm" (1983) – made the Top 20, eventually rising to No. 14. The final single – a ballad titled "Walking in the Rain" (1983) – settled at No. 7. Mullins toured with Modern Romance extensively, across Europe and the Far East; they picked up silver and gold discs along the way, released the album Juanita (1983) in Japan, and reached the No. 1 spot in Thailand with "Walking in the Rain" (1983).

Despite Modern Romance being an established name in pop music, it seemed David Jaymes and Mullins would remain generally at the forefront, their faces appearing on the majority of the record and magazine covers. Vinyl Picture discs of the singles "High Life" (1983) and "Don't Stop That Crazy Rhythm" (1983) indeed featured the faces and signatures of both Jaymes and Mullins (one on each side), as did the posters included with these singles. The pair also appeared in an article for the Tucker's Luck TV annual titled Best 1980s Artifact; Mullins (and Jaymes) appeared alongside Nick Heyward of Haircut One Hundred, Boy George of Culture Club, Simon Le Bon of Duran Duran, and Steve Norman of Spandau Ballet. By now, Mullins was prominent enough in the industry to make personal appearances on shows like Mike Read's Pop Quiz, whilst the band as a whole enjoyed live performances on TV shows hosted by Kenny Everett, Russell Harty and The Krankies.

By Christmas 1983 they were ready to release the album Party Tonight, a compilation containing all the band's hits from both the Jaymes/Deane era and the Jaymes/Mullins era, as well as a handful of cover versions and B-sidess. Party Tonight (1983) – produced by Tony Visconti and released in the UK on the Ronco label – reached No 45 in the UK Albums Chart. Mullins' vocals could also be heard – along with the rest of the band – across the radio waves, as jingles for the Radio 1 evening show were adapted from various Modern Romance hits. The single "Good Friday" / "Good Feelings" [re-mix] was released simultaneously and reached the UK No. 96 position. Both Party Tonight and Good Friday shared the same cover art, a photo still captured from the band's 1983 ITV advert for Party Tonight. It was around this time that band member John Du Prez went his own way and, taking stock of the poor success of the single Good Friday, Modern Romance decided it was time for a change in both image and music style.

The mid-1980s, however, were not as kind to the band. Modern Romance began with a new look, Mullins and the band now sporting long hair and leather jackets. The first single released alongside the band's new image was a cover version of the song "Just My Imagination (Running Away with Me)" (1984): the single failed to chart, as did their third studio album, Burn It! (1984), and its subsequent singles: "Burn It!" (1984), "That's What Friends Are For" (1984) and "Move On" (1984). The album was produced by Tony Visconti and featured additional percussion by Luis Jardim. They released a cover version of "Tarzan Boy" and finally the anthology single, "Best Mix of Our Lives" (1985), which contained the hit singles "Everybody Salsa", "Ay Ay Ay Ay Moosey", "High Life", "Don't Stop That Crazy Rhythm", and "Best Years of Our Lives". "Best Mix of Our Lives" reached No. 81 on the UK chart.

== Post-Modern Romance (1985–present) ==
Since leaving Modern Romance in 1985, Mullins has worked with Samantha Fox, Lulu, Cliff Richard, Michael Bolton, Donny Osmond, Joni Mitchell, George Harrison, Christopher Cross, James Ingram, Bonnie Tyler, Tom Jones, Alan Parsons and The Alan Parsons Project, The Celtic Tenors, Robbie Williams, Kylie Minogue, Mike Moran, Ronan Browne, Gavyn Wright, Patrick Kernan, Keith Murrell, Chris Thompson, and Peter Howarth of The Hollies among others.

He performed a duet with Joni Mitchell – "Good Friends" – on Wogan (1985) and in 1986 penned the song "It's Only Love" which was used as a b-side for the singles "My Boy Lollipop" (Lulu) and "Hold on Tight" (Fox). He further penned the b-sides for Fox's singles "Do Ya Do Ya (Wanna Please Me)" and "Touch Me (I Want Your Body)"; the songs were titled "Drop Me A Line" and "Never Fall in Love Again" respectively.

Mullins provided backing vocals for Cliff Richard on his No. 1 hit "Mistletoe and Wine" (1988); he also appeared on the live recording, which aired on Top of the Pops that same year (December). He has since provided backing vocals for Richard on a number of projects, including the tracks "The Best of Me" and "Joanna" on the album Stronger; and in television appearances and live concerts including Des O'Connor Tonight, Knebworth Festival (1990), and the Live and Kicking tour at The Royal Albert Hall (2004).

Along with Joe Brown, Vicki Brown, Steve Gould, Jeff Lynne, Keith Murrell, and Steve Winwood, Mullins provided backing vocals for George Harrison on the album Best of Dark Horse 1976-1989 (1989). Ringo Starr provided drums.

Michael J. Mullins, Peter Howarth and Keith Murrell provided backing vocals for Cliff Richard and the Shadows on the tracks "On The Beach" and "Do You Want to Dance". The songs are featured on the compilation LP Knebworth: The Album (1990).

In 1993, Mullins, Lance Ellington, Mae McKenna, Mike Stock and Miriam Stockley provided backing vocals on the Erik song "The Devil and the Deep Blue Sea". He also – along with Lance Ellington, Mae McKenna, Mike Stock and Miriam Stockley – provided backing vocals on the Sybil (singer) single "Stronger Together". The same year – with Lance Ellington, Mae McKenna and Miriam Stockley – Mullins provided backing vocals for Suzette Charles on her debut single Free To Love Again.

1995 saw Mullins and Chris Thompson headlining the World Liberty Concert as part of The Alan Parsons Project. and in 1996 – with Carl Wayne and Tim Whitnall – provided backing vocals on the album Passing Open Windows – A Symphonic Tribute to Queen by David Palmer.

In 1998, Mullins provided backing vocals for Donny Osmond track "When Children Rule the World" on the Whistle Down the Wind (1996) and compilation album (1998). and backing vocals for Everly Brothers – track, "Cold" – on the Whistle Down the Wind (1996) and compilation album (1998).

In 2000, Mullins provided male-choir backing vocals on the Kylie Minogue tracks "Your Disco Needs You" and "Loveboat". Other backing vocals on the tracks were provided by Peter Howarth, Robbie Williams and Tracy Ackerman. The songs are from the album Light Years.

In 2002 Mullins, Ellington, McKenna and Stockley provided backing vocals on the single "The World Is Mine" and album tracks "Day After Day" and "Nirvana Blue" by Belgian band Hooverphonic. All three tracks are from the concept album Hooverphonic Presents Jackie Cane. The album reached No. 1 in Belgium.

In 2003, Mullins provided vocals on two songs for The Celtic Tenors: "Mull of Kintyre" and "(Something Inside) So Strong". The album, So Strong, also featured guest musicians Browne, Howarth, Kernan, Moran, Murrell, and Wright.

Most recently, he has been part of a project with Peter Howarth and Keith Murrell called 'MHM'. He penned "Last Goodbye" with Howarth (2012); they wrote, recorded, and produced the song together, both providing vocals.

== Discography ==
=== Albums (Modern Romance) ===
- Adventures in Clubland (1981) (Backing vocals, Guitar, Thanked on Sleeve) Venezuela No. 1 [Certified Gold]
- Trick of the Light (1983) [compilation] UK No. 45
- Party Tonight (1983) UK No. 53
- Juanita [Japan] [compilation] (1983)
- Burn It! (1985)
- Modern Romance: The Platinum Collection [compilation] (2006)

=== Singles (Modern Romance) ===
- "By the Way (I'm Still in Love With You)" (backing vocals) (1982)
- "Best Years of Our Lives" (1982) UK No. 4
- "High Life" (1983) UK No. 8
- "Don't Stop That Crazy Rhythm" (1983) UK No. 14
- "Walking in the Rain" (1983) UK No. 7 Thailand No. 1
- "Good Friday" / "Good Feelings" [re-mix] (1983) UK No. 96
- "Just My Imagination (Running Away with Me)" (1984)
- "Burn It!" (1984)
- "Move On" (1984)
- "That's What Friends Are For" (1984)
- "Tarzan Boy (1985)" (1985)
- "Best Mix of Our Lives" (1985) UK No. 81

=== Notes ===
The compilation album, Modern Romance: The Platinum Collection was released on CD in 2006, and contains a wide variety of the band's songs from the Jaymes/Mullins era. Adventures in Clubland has also been released on CD. Trick of the Light can be found on CD import from Japan, and his highly sought after by audiophiles. Each album – up until Burn It! – is available on vinyl and cassette tape, although long out-of-print.

== Songwriting credits (Modern Romance) ==
- "Walking in the Rain" / "Walking in the Rain" (Blues) – Single (1983) UK No. 7 Thailand No. 1
- "Good Friday" – Single (1983) UK No. 96
- "After All This Time" – Album Track – Trick of the Light (1983)
- "Leave Me on My Own" – Album Track – Trick of the Light (1983)
- "Burn It!" – Single (1984)
- "Move On" – Single (1984)
- "That's What Friends Are For" – Single (1984)
- "That's Entertainment" – Album Track – Burn It! (1984)
- "I'll Always Remember You" – Album Track – Burn It! (1984)
- "Keep A Candle Burning" – Album Track – Burn It! (1984)
- "Take Another Look" – Album Track – Burn It! (1984)
- "Wasting Away" – Album Track – Burn It! (1984)
- "Burn It!" [reprise] – Album Track – Burn It! (1984).

== Other credits (post-Modern Romance) ==
- Straight to the Heart for Straight Eight (Harmony Vocals), Album (1981).
- "It's Only Love" for Lulu: the b-side to "My Boy Lollipop", songwriter (1986)
- "It's Only Love" for Samantha Fox: the b-side to "Hold on Tight", songwriter (1986)
- "Drop Me A Line" for Samantha Fox: the b-side to the 12" Single "Do Ya Do Ya", songwriter (1986)
- "Never Gonna Fall in Love Again" for Samantha Fox: the b-side to "Touch Me", songwriter (1986)
- "Joanna" and "The Best of Me", Cliff Richard, Stronger, (Backing Vocals) (1989)
- George Harrison album Best of Dark Horse 1976-1989 (Backing Vocals) (1989)
- Cliff Richard and the Shadows tracks "Do You Want to Dance" and On The Beach, album Knebworth: The Album (1990) (Backing Vocals)
- Suzette Charles, "Free to Love Again" (1993) (Backing Vocals)
- Sybil, "Stronger Together" (1993) (Backing Vocals)
- "The Devil and the Deep Blue Sea", Erik (1993) (Backing Vocals)
- Keep Passing the Open Windows – A Symphonic Tribute to Queen, David Palmer (Backing Vocals) (1996)
- "When Children Rule the World", Donny Osmond, album Songs from Whistle Down the Wind (Backing Vocals) (1998)
- "Cold", Everly Brothers, album Songs from Whistle Down the Wind (Backing Vocals) (1998)
- Kylie Minogue, tracks "Loveboat" and "Your Disco Needs You", album Light Years (2000) (Choir Backing Vocals)
- Hooverphonic, singles "Day After Day", "Nirvana Blue" and "The World Is Mine", album Hooverphonic Presents Jackie Cane (Backing Vocals) (2002)
- "Mull of Kintyre" with The Celtic Tenors (Vocals), Album So Strong (2003)
- "(Something Inside) So Strong" with The Celtic Tenors (Vocals), Album So Strong (2003)
- "Last Goodbye" Duet with Peter Howarth, songwriter, vocals, guitar (2012)

== Films ==
- Beyond the Sea – Backing Vocals (2004)
- Planet 51 – performer on "Mr. Sandman", "Greased Lightnin", and "Gonna Be a Star" (2009)

== Television ==
=== Self ===
- The Keith Harris Show episode #1.4 with Modern Romance (1982)
- The Krankies Klub episode #1.0 with Modern Romance (1982)
- Top of the Pops [2 December] with Modern Romance Best Years ... (1982)
- The Krankies Klub episode #1.1 with Modern Romance (1983)
- The Krankies Klub episode #1.4 with Modern Romance (1983)
- Crackerjack [unknown episodes] with Modern Romance (1983)
- The Kenny Everett Television Show [unknown episodes] with Modern Romance and Cleo Rocos (1983)
- Rod and Emu's Saturday Special episode #1.2 with Modern Romance (1983)
- Christmas Supersonic TV Special with Modern Romance performing Good Friday (1983)
- Top of the Pops [unknown episodes] (1982–83)
- Pop Quiz 25 September – Team David Gilmour, Maggie (Swans Way), Mullins (1984)

== Music videos ==
- "Don't Stop That Crazy Rhythm" with Modern Romance (1983)
- "Walking in the Rain" with Modern Romance (1983)
- "Burn It" with Modern Romance (1984)
- "Mistletoe and Wine" with Cliff Richard – Live on Top of the Pops (1988)

== Live appearances ==
- Knebworth Festival with Cliff Richard [backing vocals] 30 June 1990 [as Mick Mullins]
- Live and Kicking Tour with Cliff Richard [backing vocals] April/May 2004 [as Mick Mullins]
- World Liberty Concert with The Alan Parsons Project January 2009 [as Mick Mullins]

== Magazine and newspaper appearances ==
- Look-in (Magazine) TV Annual, article Best 1980s Artifact with David Jaymes: (1983)
- Look-in (Magazine) TV Annual, comic strip story When They Were Young 1 (1983)†
- Look-in (Magazine) with Modern Romance: 5 February, #6 (1983)
- Jackie (Magazine) with Modern Romance: 19 February #996 (1983)
- Look-in (Magazine) with Modern Romance: 12 March, #11 (1983)
- Record Mirror (Music Newspaper) with Modern Romance: 12 March (1983)
- Look-in (Magazine) with Modern Romance: 19 March, #12 (1983)
- Smash Hits (Magazine) with Modern Romance: 12 May (1983)
- Jackie (Magazine) with David Jaymes: 14 May, #1010
- Jackie (Magazine) with David Jaymes: 23 July #1020 (1983)
- Oh Boy & Photo-Love (Magazine) with Modern Romance: 6 August, #339 (1983)
- Smash Hits (Magazine) with Modern Romance: 9 September (1983)
- Jackie (Magazine) with Modern Romance: 15 October, #1032 (1983)
- Number One (Magazine) with Modern Romance: 12 November (1983)
- Patches (Magazine) with Modern Romance: 19 November, #246 (1983)
- Look-in (Magazine) with Modern Romance: 24 December, #11 (1983)
- Look-in (Magazine) with Modern Romance: 12 May, #20 (1984)
- Number One (Magazine) with Modern Romance: 12 May, (1984)

† Mullins artwork sketched by Mike Noble

== Videos featuring Mullins ==
- "Best Years of Our Lives" – Top of the Pops (1982)
- "Best Years of Our Lives" – Top of the Pops (1982)
- "Best Years of Our Lives" – Top of the Pops 2 (1982)
- "Cherry Pink and Apple Blossom White" – Top of the Pops – Mullins on guitar (1982)
- "Walking in the Rain" – Top of the Pops (1983)
- "Walking in the Rain" – Top of the Pops (1983)
- "Walking in the Rain" – Official video (1983)
- "Don't Stop That Crazy Rhythm" – Official video (1983)
- "Don't Stop That Crazy Rhythm" – Top of the Pops (1983)
- "High Life" – [unknown venue] – 'Trick of the Light' suits (1983)
- "High Life" – Top of the Pops (1983)
- "Good Friday" – Christmas Supersonic (1983)
- "Tarzan Boy" – Special 12" Dance Mix (1985)
- Cliff Richard – "Mistletoe & Wine" – Top of the Pops – Mullins as backing vocalist (1988)
- "Last Goodbye" – Duet with Peter Howarth (2012)
- The Alan Parsons Project – Sirius/Eye in the Sky – as Mick Mullins [lead vocals]
- The Alan Parsons Project – Old and Wise – as Mick Mullins [lead vocalist]
- Cliff Richard – "Carrie" / "Devil Woman" – Mullins as backing vocalist
- Cliff Richard – Various performances with Cliff Richard on Des O'Connor Tonight – Mullins as backing vocalist

== See also ==
- David Jaymes of Modern Romance
- John Du Prez of Modern Romance
- Geoff Deane of Modern Romance
- Modern Romance
