= Party Tonight =

Compilation album by Modern Romance
- Released: 1983
- Label: Ronco
- Producer: Tony Visconti

Modern Romance chronology
Trick of the Light (1983)	Party Tonight (1983)	Burn It! (1985)

Party Tonight is the third album by English band Modern Romance. It is a compilation album released in 1983 on LP and Cassette tape by Ronco. A Japanese reissue on LP was released, titled Juanita, but is long out of print.

== Track listing ==
1. Best Years of Our Lives – (David Jaymes, John Du Prez)
2. Ay Ay Ay Ay Moosey – (D. Jaymes, Geoff Deane)
3. Everybody Salsa – (D. Jaymes, Geoff Deane)
4. Don't Stop That Crazy Rhythm – (D. Jaymes, John Du Prez)
5. High Life – (D. Jaymes, John Du Prez)
6. Band of Gold – (R. Dunbar, E. Wayne)
7. Queen of the Rapping Scene / Nothing Ever Goes the Way You Plan – (D. Jaymes, Geoff Deane)
8. Good Friday – (Michael J. Mullins)
9. Salsa Rappsody – (D. Jaymes, Geoff Deane)
10. Cherry Pink and Apple Blossom White [New Version] – (Louis Guglielmi, Mack David)
11. Moose on the Loose – (D. Jaymes, Geoff Deane)
12. Just My Imagination (Running Away with Me) – (N. Whitfield, B. Strong)
13. Love Letters – (V. Young, E. Heyman)
14. Walking in the Rain – 4:41 (D. Jaymes, Michael John Mullins)

== Chart position ==
- UK (1983) # 45

== Personnel ==
- Michael J. Mullins – vocals
- Geoff Deane – Vocals
- Paul Gendler – guitar
- David Jaymes – bass guitar
- Robbie Jaymes – synthesizer
- Andy Kyriacou – drums
- Tony Gainsborough – drums
- John Du Prez – trumpet

== Singles ==
- Everybody Salsa (1981) UK No. 12
- Ay Ay Ay Ay, Moosey (1981) UK No. 10
- Queen of the Rapping Scene/Nothing Ever Goes The Way You Plan UK No. 37
- Cherry Pink and Apple Blossom White (1982) UK No. 15
- Best Years of Our Lives (1982) UK No. 4
- High Life (1983) UK No. 8
- Don't Stop That Crazy Rhythm (1983) UK No. 14
- Walking in the Rain (1983) UK No. 7 Thailand No. 1
- Good Friday (1983) UK No. 96
- Just My Imagination (Running Away with Me) (1984)

== History ==
Party Tonight is a compilation album released by multi-hit Salsa and pop music group Modern Romance on the Ronco label. It was out in shops—on vinyl and cassette tape—ready for Christmas 1983 and showcased their biggest hits. It further offered some album tracks and cover versions. Party Tonight reached No. 45 on the UK Albums Chart, wrapping up what had been the band's watershed year; it is their highest charting album in the UK to date. The album was produced by Tony Visconti and featured tracks from their two previous studio albums—Adventures in Clubland (1982) and Trick of the Light (1983)—and featured its sister single, "Good Friday", released simultaneously. Party Tonight and Good Friday share the same cover photo.

The album features both lead vocalists—Geoff Deane (1980–82) and Michael J. Mullins (1982–1985)—and was released in Germany by WEA and in Japan (under the title Juanita). The signature trumpets and horns by band member and conductor-composer John Du Prez are evident throughout.

== Promotion ==
The album was advertised on UK television and selected tracks were used as jingles on BBC Radio 1. Further adverts were placed in national newspapers.
