= Good Friday (song) =

Single by Modern Romance

from the album Party Tonight
- Released: 11 November 1983
- Genre: Pop music
- Label: WEA
- Songwriter: Michael J. Mullins
- Producer: Tony Visconti

Modern Romance singles chronology
"Walking in the Rain" (1983)	"Good Friday" (1983)	"Just My Imagination (Running Away with Me)" (1984)

"Good Friday" (a.k.a. Good Friday / Good Feelings [re-mix]) is a 1983 song by Modern Romance. It was taken from their album Party Tonight.

== Formats ==
7-inch single

- "Good Friday"
- "Good Feelings" [re-mix]

12-inch single

- "Good Friday"
- "Good Feelings" [re-mix]
- "Love Letters" [cover version]

== Chart position ==
- UK Singles Chart No. 96

== History ==
Good Friday had started to lose the party-Latin style, giving way to more experimental pop tunes like the mambo-esque "Don't Stop That Crazy Rhythm" and the bluesy "Walking in the Rain". Both of these tunes made the Top 20 on the UK Chart. However, "Good Friday" seemed like a return to hits such as "Best Year of Our Lives" and "High Life" – and to further punctuate this, their Trick of the Light party track, "Good Feelings", was included as a double A-side, albeit re-mixed. The song underperformed, climbing to only No. 96. It was released simultaneously with the compilation album Party Tonight which fared well. Party Tonight was the highest-charting album for Modern Romance. "Good Friday" shared exactly the same cover as Party Tonight; it was released in two formats: a 7-inch single and 12-inch single by WEA. Tony Visconti served as producer. The reverse side of the 12-inch vinyl featured another album track and cover version from Party Tonight, "Love Letters".

== Albums (featured on) ==
- Party Tonight compilation album (1983)
- Modern Romance: The Platinum Collection compilation album (2006)

== Genre ==
"Good Friday" – and its B-side Good Feelings – are a mix of pop music and party music with a hint of their signature traditional salsa music style. It was the final single to feature John Du Prez.

== Personnel ==
- Michael J. Mullins – vocals
- David Jaymes – bass guitar
- Robbie Jaymes – synthesizer
- Paul Gendler – guitar
- John Du Prez – trumpet
- Andy Kyriacou – drums
- Tony Visconti – producer (music)
