= Can You Move =

Single by Modern Romance

from the album Adventures in Clubland
- Released: 1981
- Genre: Pop music, salsa music, dance music
- Label: Atlantic, WEA
- Songwriter(s): Geoffrey Deane, David Wilkerson

Modern Romance singles chronology
"Everybody Salsa" (1981)	"Can You Move" (1981)	"Ay Ay Ay Ay Moosey" (1981)

"Can You Move" is a single by UK band Modern Romance. It was released in the United States in 1982 as a 12-inch single by Atlantic Records, and in Japan as a 7-inch single through WEA.

== History ==
"Can You Move" is related to "Can You Dance", which was released in the United States, where it reached #2 on the Billboard Dance Chart. It was released in Japan in 1982. The single lso backs their UK hit, "Queen of the Rapping Scene (Nothing Ever Goes the Way You Plan)" (1982), which peaked at #37 on the UK chart. "Can You Move" was re-released as "Can You Move '88" by band member, David Jaymes.

== Formats ==
=== 7-inch single (Japan) ===
- Can You Move It
- Queen of the Rapping Scene

=== 12-inch single (America) ===
- Can You Move [Vocal Midnight Mix]
- Can You Move [Instrumental Midnight Mix]

=== 12-inch promo (America) ===
- Can You Move [Vocal Midnight Mix]
- Can You Move [Instrumental Midnight Mix]

== Chart performance ==
Chart (1981)	Peak position
US Dance Club Songs (Billboard)	2

== Personnel ==
- Geoff Deane – vocals
- David Jaymes – bass guitar
- Robbie Jaymes – synthesizer
- Paul Gendler – guitar
- Andy Kyriacou – drums
- Richie Rivera – Mixer dance
