= Shrek (soundtrack) =

2001 film soundtrack album

Shrek (Music from the Original Motion Picture)

Soundtrack album by various artists
- Released: May 15, 2001
- Genres: Alternative rock; pop; pop rock
- Length: 39:49
- Label: DreamWorks
- Producers: Ron Aniello, Joe Barresi, Jon Brion, Jimmy Harry, Oliver Leiber, Patrick Leonard, Michael Mangini, Eric Valentine, Pete Wingfield, Gavin Greenaway, Harry Gregson-Williams, John Powell, Steve Greenberg

Singles from Shrek: Music from the Original Motion Picture
- 1. "Like Wow!" Released: January 2001; 2. "Best Years of Our Lives" Released: June 2001; 3. "I'm a Believer" Released: August 2001; 4. "Stay Home" Released: January 2002

Shrek (Music from the Original Motion Picture) is the soundtrack album to the 2001 DreamWorks Animation film Shrek, released by DreamWorks Records on May 15, 2001. The album consisted of licensed contemporary songs ranging from the pop, pop rock and alternative rock genres. Shrek was one of the first mainstream animated films to use licensed songs instead of having pre-written musical material which was common in animated films during the Disney Renaissance era.

The idea of utilizing pop songs had been considered through the discussions from directors Andrew Adamson and Vicky Jenson, DreamWorks' CEO Jeffrey Katzenberg, and music supervisor Marylata Elton Jacob, as they wanted the film's music to differ from the traditional animated films. Since Adamson and Jenson were not much privy to animated films, they approached Shrek as an independent film where the use of contemporary songs would provide depth and emotions to the characters, despite the film's medieval setting.

Shrek's soundtrack was a commercial success topping the Billboard Soundtracks chart and entering the top-50 of several others upon release. It was certified double platinum by the Recording Industry Association of America (RIAA) for selling more than 2 million copies in the United States. Its success inspired the use of licensed songs in subsequent animated films. The soundtrack was nominated at the BAFTA Award for Best Film Music and for the Grammy Award for Best Compilation Soundtrack for Visual Media but lost the respective awards to Moulin Rouge! and O Brother, Where Art Thou?. Since its release, the soundtrack has been considered a major cultural phenomenon.

== Background and development ==
Shrek was the first instance of an American animated film using pre-existing songs as opposed to most traditional animated films which had original songs written specifically for them. This was partly because of the Disney Renaissance era where most of that studio's output had original sing-along songs and every animated film outside Disney followed suit. DreamWorks' chief executive officer Jeffrey Katzenberg, who was a former Disney executive, had also envisioned on utilizing a signature for their company. Antz, Chicken Run mostly relied on original scores, and The Prince of Egypt and The Road to El Dorado had an original soundtrack.

Marylata Elton Jacob joined as a music supervisor for DreamWorks in 1995; her goal was not to incorporate the same vintage formula that Disney used for their animation ventures, instead opting for the use of popular songs, a then-novel concept. Andrew Adamson and Vicky Jenson, the directors of the film, has spearheaded the idea of utilizing pop and contemporary music, as both of them had not been "immersed in the world of animation so much, or in animated films" and took an independent film approach to Shrek. Jenson said that the use of contemporary songs in independent films had highlighted the emotional quotient of character and believed it could also achieve success in animated films. Adamson said that Pulp Fiction and the use of contemporary music in the film and its soundtrack largely inspired the idea to use needle drops effectively.

To demonstrate the potential needle-drop idea, the editor Sim Evan-Jones brought a CD of Donovan's "Season of the Witch" for use in the early sequences. It was said to have worked "sonically and thematically", prompting the creative team to utilize licensed songs based on the personal and instinctual tastes. Even though the licensing of music, was costly and not a familiar formula for animated films, Katzenberg had liked the idea which led the team to proceed with. Elton stated that most of the team had great music sensibilities and considered it to be a true team effort on selecting songs that would work musically, lyrically, thematically and emotionally, and avoiding on-the-nose tracks that would ruin the mood of the film. Jenson felt the use of modern-day music in a medieval setting suited the reinvention of the story and characters.

== Curation ==
While Shrek was characterized by the sense of humor, each song represents a genuine emotion within the character. The use of Leonard Cohen's "Hallelujah" was to capture Shrek's heartbreak, as "[he] angry and bitter and didn’t realize how much he was longing for friendship", according to Jenson, who felt that John Cale had "seemed to capture the crusty skin that Shrek wore around protectively". The soundtrack version was however performed by Rufus Wainwright, due to him being a featured artist of the DreamWorks label. The Proclaimers' "I'm on My Way" was used as a placeholder for Willie Nelson's "On the Road Again" which was sung by Donkey in the sequence where he and Shrek began their journey to rescue Princess Fiona; the former was used to highlight Shrek's character development with the line, "I'm on my way from misery to happiness today".

The opening scene was soundtrack by "All Star" from Smash Mouth as a temporary placeholder for the animators to use it. Though DreamWorks hired Matt Mahaffey to create a song based on the scene, audiences in the test screening preferred "All Star", leading the team to approach Smash Mouth, who were recording their third album under their eponymous title, to use their song as well as also recording the final track, a remake of The Monkees' "I'm a Believer". This song was chosen as Jeffrey Katzenberg wanted to redo the film's ending, in order to "go out with a big laugh"; the film previously had a storybook ending of Shrek and Fiona holding hands and walking over the sunset.

Smash Mouth bassist Paul De Lisle admitted that the band made a right choice, albeit few of the band members being hesitant on spreading thin with a film soundtrack. He recalled that most of the people in their forthcoming concerts after Shrek's release, had concertgoers dressing up as Shrek, holding a Shrek sign, with people believing that singer Steve Harwell was also Shrek as the vocals had matched with the character seamlessly.

== Track listing ==
| No. | Title | Writer(s) | Producer(s) | Length |
|---|---|---|---|---|
| 1. | "Stay Home" (performed by Self) | Matt Mahaffey | | 3:32 |
| 2. | "I'm a Believer" (performed by Smash Mouth) | Neil Diamond | Eric Valentine | 3:10 |
| 3. | "Like Wow!" (performed by Leslie Carter) | Jimmy Harry, Sandra St. Victor | Oliver Leiber, David Gamson | 3:35 |
| 4. | "It Is You (I Have Loved)" (performed by Dana Glover) | Harry Gregson-Williams, John Powell, Gavin Greenaway, Dana Glover | Gavin Greenaway, Harry Gregson-Williams | 3:59 |
| 5. | "Best Years of Our Lives" (performed by Baha Men) | David Jaymes, Geoffrey Deane, Marvin Prosper | Michael Mangini, Steve Greenberg | 2:57 |
| 6. | "Bad Reputation" (performed by Halfcocked (Note: Joan Jett and the Blackhearts' original recording was used in the film.)) | Joan Jett, Kenny Laguna, Ritchie Cordell, Marty Kupersmith | Joe Barresi | 2:21 |
| 7. | "My Beloved Monster" (performed by Eels) | E | Jon Brion, E | 2:12 |
| 8. | "You Belong to Me" (performed by Jason Wade) | Pee Wee King, Redd Stewart, Chilton Price | Ron Aniello | 2:42 |
| 9. | "All Star" (performed by Smash Mouth) | Greg Camp | Eric Valentine | 3:21 |
| 10. | "Hallelujah" (performed by Rufus Wainwright (Note: Although the song was performed by John Cale in the film, Wainwright's recording of the song was chosen for usage in the soundtrack album due to him being a featured artist at the label.)) | Leonard Cohen | Patrick Leonard | 4:09 |
| 11. | "I'm on My Way" (performed by The Proclaimers) | Charlie Reid, Craig Reid | Pete Wingfield | 3:40 |
| 12. | "I'm a Believer (Reprise)" (performed by Eddie Murphy) | Neil Diamond | N/A | 1:14 |
| 13. | "True Love's First Kiss" (Film score) | Harry Gregson-Williams, John Powell | Harry Gregson-Williams, John Powell | 3:11 |

== Reception and legacy ==
Professional ratings
Review scores
| Source | Rating |
|---|---|
| AllMusic | 3/5 stars |

The Shrek soundtrack has been regarded as an integral pop culture phenomenon amongst the millennials, largely owing to its use of contemporary needle-drops and being different from the animated films from the Disney Renaissance era. The use of pop music immediately connected with the audiences across the younger and older demographic, attributing to the situational and contextual themes. Several critics viewed the film's soundtrack as one of the period's finest and considered it to be a multi-layered phenomenon. They attributed it to its perceived difference from the animated film soundtracks and praised it for its uniqueness and variety.

Within two months of the film's release, the soundtrack peaked at number 28 in the Billboard 200 charts. In the United States, the soundtrack sold around 2.5 million copies; it was also successful in the United Kingdom. In Australia, the soundtrack had 133 million streams according to Spotify. The international success of the album prompted Universal Music Group to re-release it in the vinyl LP format after its popularity was renewed in the 2010s. The LP record published by Interscope Records (a subsidiary of UMG) was released in August 2, 2019.

== Charts ==
=== Weekly charts ===
| Chart (2001–2002) | Peak position |
|---|---|
| Argentine Albums (CAPIF) | 17 |
| Australian Albums (ARIA) | 2 |
| Austrian Albums (Ö3 Austria) | 9 |
| Canadian Albums (Billboard) | 11 |
| Danish Albums (Hitlisten) | 19 |
| French Albums (SNEP) | 42 |
| German Albums (Offizielle Top 100) | 21 |
| Swiss Albums (Schweizer Hitparade) | 48 |
| US Billboard 200 | 28 |
| US Soundtracks (Billboard) | 1 |

| Chart (2026) | Peak position |
|---|---|
| Belgian Albums (Ultratop Flanders) | 183 |

=== Year-end charts ===
2001 year-end chart performance for Shrek
| Chart (2001) | Position |
|---|---|
| Canadian Albums (Nielsen SoundScan) | 47 |

2002 year-end chart performance for Shrek
| Chart (2002) | Position |
|---|---|
| Canadian Albums (Nielsen SoundScan) | 28 |

== Certifications ==
| Region | Certification | Certified units/sales |
|---|---|---|
| Australia (ARIA) | 4× Platinum | 280,000^{^} |
| Canada (Music Canada) | Gold | 50,000^{^} |
| New Zealand (RMNZ) | Platinum | 15,000^{‡} |
| Poland (ZPAV) | Platinum | 40,000^{*} |
| United Kingdom (BPI) | Gold | 100,000^{*} |
| United States (RIAA) | 2× Platinum | 2,000,000^{^} |
^{*} Sales figures based on certification alone.^{^} Shipments figures based on certification alone.^{‡} Sales+streaming figures based on certification alone.

== Accolades ==
| Awards | Date of ceremony | Category | Recipient(s) | Result | Ref. |
|---|---|---|---|---|---|
| Grammy Awards | February 27, 2002 | Best Compilation Soundtrack Album for Motion Pictures, Television or Other Visual Media | Shrek (Music from the Original Motion Picture) | Nominated | |
