= Walking in the Rain =

Walking in the Rain may refer to:

- "Walking in the Rain" (Flash and the Pan song), 1978, covered by Grace Jones
- "Walking in the Rain" (The Ronettes song), 1964
- "Walking in the Rain" (Modern Romance song), 1983
- "Walking in the Rain", a single by Chancellor and Younha, 2020

== See also ==
- "The Rain" (Oran "Juice" Jones song)
- Just Walkin' in the Rain, Johnnie Ray song
