= Good Friday (disambiguation) =

Good Friday is a Christian holiday remembering the crucifixion of Jesus Christ and his death at Calvary.

Good Friday may also refer to:

- Good Friday, a play in verse by English poet John Masefield
- Good Friday (album), a 1967 album by The Easybeats
- "Good Friday" (song), a 1983 song by Modern Romance
- "Good Friday", a 1996 song by The Black Crowes on their album Three Snakes and One Charm
- GOOD Fridays, 2010 and 2016 giveaway of songs by Kanye West

== See also ==
Good Friday Agreement, a major political development in the Northern Ireland peace process of the 1990s
