= High Life (song) =

Single by Modern Romance

from the album Trick of the Light, Party Tonight, The Platinum Collection
- Released: 1983
- Genre: Pop music
- Label: WEA
- Songwriters: John Du Prez, David Wilkerson
- Producer: Tony Visconti

Modern Romance singles chronology
"Best Years of Our Lives" (1982)	"High Life" (1983)	"Don't Stop That Crazy Rhythm" (1983)

"High Life" is a Top 10 single from UK band Modern Romance. It was released in 1983 by WEA as a 7-inch picture disc and a 12-inch single. A Japanese and German edition was also released.

== Formats ==
=== 7-inch single ===
- High Life
- You Just Can't Kill The Beat

=== 12-inch single ===
- High Life
- You Just Can't Kill The Beat
- Band of Gold [cover]

=== 7-inch picture disc ===
- High Life (Michael J. Mullins photo)
- You Just Can't Kill The Beat (David Jaymes Photo)

== Chart position ==
- UK Singles Chart No. 8

== History ==
High Life (1982) was the third Top 10 single for Modern Romance (band). It was the second single to feature Michael J. Mullins as lead vocalist and peaked at No. 8 on the UK chart in 1983. The single can be found on Modern Romance's two hit albums, Trick of the Light (1983) and Party Tonight (1983). It also made an appearance on their farewell single, Best Mix of Our Lives (1985) with four other singles: Best Years of Our Lives, Don't Stop That Crazy Rhythm, Everybody Salsa, and Ay Ay Ay Ay Moosey. The 12-inch vinyl came with a special fold-out poster of Michael J. Mullins and David Jaymes.

The 12-inch B-side, Band of Gold, is a cover version, which also features on the Modern Romance compilation albums Party Tonight (1983) and Modern Romance: The Platinum Collection (2006). High Life was written by Modern Romance founder member, David Jaymes. It can also be found on the Japanese compilation, Juanita (1983).

== Personnel ==
- Michael J. Mullins – vocals
- David Jaymes – bass guitar
- Robbie Jaymes – synthesizer
- Paul Gendler – guitar
- John Du Prez – trumpet
- Andy Kyriacou – drums
- Tony Visconti – producer (music)
