= Burn It =

Burn It may refer to:

- Burn It (TV series), a 2003 British television series
- Burn It (song), a 2020 song by Agust D
- Burn It, a song by Fever 333, from the album Strength in Numb333rs

== See also ==
- Burn It!, a 1985 album by Modern Romance
- Burn It! (song), a 1984 single by Modern Romance
