= Best Years of Our Lives (song) =

1982 single by Modern Romance

Single by Modern Romance

from the album Trick of the Light, Party Tonight, The Platinum Collection
- Released: October 1982
- Genre: Pop, salsa, new wave
- Length: 2:35
- Label: WEA
- Songwriters: Geoffrey Deane, David Jaymes
- Producer: Tony Visconti

Modern Romance singles chronology
"Cherry Pink and Apple Blossom White" (1982)	"Best Years of Our Lives" (1982)	"High Life" (1983)

"Best Years of Our Lives" is a song recorded by English band Modern Romance. It was released in October 1982 as a 7-inch single and 12-inch single by WEA. A Japanese and German edition was also released.

== Formats ==
=== 7-inch single ===
The 7-inch single was available in two versions:

- Best Years of Our Lives
- We've Got Them Running (The Counting Song)

A limited edition "Xmas Party Mix" remix of the song became available as a 7-inch single over Christmas 1982, which received substantial radio airplay in place of the original version over Christmas 1982.

=== 12-inch single ===
- Best Years of Our Lives (Parts 1&2) Midnight Mix
- Best Years of Our Lives (Parts 1&2) Extended Mix
- We've Got Them Running (The Counting Song)

== Chart position ==
Chart (1982–1983)	Peak position
Australia (Kent Music Report)	89
Ireland (IRMA)	6
Sweden (Sverigetopplistan)	11
UK Singles (OCC)	4

== History ==
"Best Years of Our Lives" was the biggest-selling single for Modern Romance. It was the first single to feature Michael J. Mullins as lead vocalist and peaked at number 4 on the UK Singles Chart in late 1982. The single can be found on Modern Romance's hit albums Trick of the Light (1983) and Party Tonight (1983). It also made an appearance on their farewell single "Best Mix of Our Lives" (1985) in a medley with four other singles: "High Life", "Don't Stop That Crazy Rhythm", "Everybody Salsa", and "Ay Ay Ay Ay Moosey". It served as a 7-inch single [re-mix] on the B-side of "Best Mix of Our Lives" and as a 12-inch single [re-mix] on the B-side of the 12-inch version of "Best Mix...".

The original B-side, "We've Got Them Running (The Counting Song)", was taken from the Modern Romance debut studio album Adventures in Clubland and features the lead vocals of Geoff Deane. It was written by Modern Romance founder member David Jaymes. The latest appearance of "Best Years..." is on the compilation CD Modern Romance: The Platinum Collection (2006).

As part of a long string of cover version songs, Black Lace released their re-creation in 1989.

The name of the song was inspired by the 1975 song of the same name by Steve Harley & Cockney Rebel.

== Personnel ==
- Michael J. Mullins – vocals
- David Jaymes – bass guitar
- Robbie Jaymes – synthesizer
- Paul Gendler – guitar
- John Du Prez – trumpet
- Andy Kyriacou – drums
- Tony Visconti – producer (music)
- Geoff Deane – vocals (on We've Got Them Running (The Counting Song))

== Baha Men cover ==
"Best Years of Our Lives"

Single by Baha Men

from the album Shrek: Music from the Original Motion Picture and Move It Like This
- Released: 11 June 2001
- Genre: Reggae fusion, pop-rap
- Length: 2:58
- Label: S-Curve
- Songwriters: Rick Carey, Geoffrey Deane, David Jaymes, Marvin Prosper

Baha Men singles chronology
"You All Dat" (2001)	"Best Years of Our Lives" (2001)	"Move It Like This" (2002)

In 2001, the song regained popularity after it was covered by the Bahamian Junkanoo group Baha Men and featured in the 2001 DreamWorks' animated fairy tale comedy film Shrek.

It was the Baha Men's sixth single and reached number 49 on the Australian ARIA Charts and number 70 on the Swiss Music Charts. It also appeared on their album Move It Like This.

=== Critical reception ===
The Baha Men cover received generally positive reviews. According to the Baltimore Afro-American, the song was "shaping up to be a worthy follow-up to Who Let the Dogs Out?," while Terry vanHorn of MTV.com called it a "playful dance song." Eric Schumacher-Rasmussen, also of MTV.com, referred to the song as upbeat.

=== Charts ===
Chart (2001)	Peak position
Australia (ARIA)	49
Austria (Ö3 Austria Top 40)	66
Switzerland (Schweizer Hitparade)	70
