= Trick of the Light (album) =

Studio album by Modern Romance
- Released: 8 April 1983
- Length: 38:04
- Label: WEA
- Producer: Tony Visconti

Modern Romance chronology
Adventures in Clubland (1981)	Trick of the Light (1983)	Burn It! (1985)

Singles from Trick of the Light
- 1. "Best Years of Our Lives" Released: November 1982; 2. "High Life" Released: February 1983; 3. "Don't Stop That Crazy Rhythm" Released: May 1983; 4. "Walking in the Rain" Released: July 1983

Professional ratings
Review scores
Source	Rating
AllMusic	2/5 stars

Trick of the Light is the second album by English band Modern Romance. It was released in 1983 on LP and Cassette tape by WEA. A Japanese reissue on CD was released, but is long out of print. There was a European re-release in 2018 as a 24 bit remastered, expanded edition with 4 extra tracks.

== Track listing ==
1. "High Life" (David Jaymes, John Du Prez) - 3:28
2. "Don't Stop That Crazy Rhythm" (David Jaymes, John Du Prez) - 3:36
3. "Best Years of Our Lives" [Album Version] (David Jaymes, Geoff Deane) - 3:45
4. "Good Feelings" (David Jaymes, Robbie Jaymes) - 3:36
5. "Walking in the Rain" (David Jaymes, Michael John Mullins) - 4:41
6. "Let's Go" (David Jaymes) - 3:43
7. "Cherry Pink and Apple Blossom White" [New Version] (Louis Guglielmi, Mack David) - 3:44
8. "After All This Time" (David Jaymes, Michael John Mullins, Paul Gendler, Andy Kyriacou) - 3:50
9. "She's So Fine" (David Jaymes, John Du Prez) - 3:32
10. "Leave Me On My Own" (David Jaymes, Michael John Mullins) - 4:09

== Chart position ==
- UK (1983) # 53

== Personnel ==
- Michael J. Mullins – vocals
- Paul Gendler – guitar
- David Jaymes – bass guitar
- Robbie Jaymes – synthesizer
- Andy Kyriacou – drums
- John Du Prez – trumpet

== Singles ==
- "Cherry Pink and Apple Blossom White" (1982) #15
- "Best Years of Our Lives" (1982) #4
- "High Life" (1983) #8
- "Don't Stop That Crazy Rhythm" (1983) #14
- "Walking in the Rain (1983 song)" (1983) (1983) #7
- "Good Feelings" [remix] / Good Friday (1983 song) [Double A-Side] (1983) #96

== History ==
The album is featured in the Taschen book 1000 Covers, which showcases the most interesting vinyl covers from the 1960s to the 1990s (their single, "Don't Stop That Crazy Rhythm", shares a similar sleeve). It is the first Modern Romance album to feature lead vocalist Michael J. Mullins, who replaced Geoff Deane in 1982. The [New Version] of "Cherry Pink and Apple Blossom White" (1983) features the voice of Mullins, whereas Deane provided vocals on the 7-inch vinyl (1982) version. "Cherry Pink ..." is known for the trumpet solo by band member and composer / conductor, John Du Prez. The track, "Good Feelings"', was released at Christmas (1983) as a double A-Side [remixed] along with "Good Friday", the latter being taken from the hit compilation Christmas album, Party Tonight; both single and album featured identical covers. Trick of the Light contains no less than six hit singles, five of them top-twenty, three of these top-ten, making 1983 in music Modern Romance's watershed year. Two of the album tracks – "Best Years of Our Lives" and "High Life" – featured as part of the band's farewell single, "Best Mix of Our Lives", which charted at #81 in 1985.

== See also ==
- John Du Prez
- Modern Romance (band)
- Modern Romance (band)
- John Du Prez
- Trick of the Light discography at Discogs
- Modern Romance (band) – Official Charts Company
