= Don't Stop That Crazy Rhythm =

Single by Modern Romance

from the album Trick of the Light
- Released: 1983
- Genre: Pop music
- Label: WEA
- Songwriter(s): D. Jaymes, Du Prez
- Producer(s): Tony Visconti

Modern Romance singles chronology
"High Life" (1983)	"Don't Stop That Crazy Rhythm" (1983)	"Walking in the Rain" (1983)

"Don't Stop That Crazy Rhythm" is a Top 20 single from UK band Modern Romance. It was released in 1983 as a 7-inch single, 7-inch picture disc, and 12-inch single by WEA. German and Spanish versions were also released.

== Formats ==
=== 7-inch single ===
- "Don't Stop That Crazy Rhythm"
- "I Can't Help Myself"

=== 12-inch single ===
- "Don't Stop That Crazy Rhythm"
- "I Can't Help Myself"
- "Just My Imagination (Running Away with Me)" [cover]

=== 7-inch picture disc ===
- "Don't Stop That Crazy Rhythm" (Michael J. Mullins photo)
- "I Can't Help" (David Jaymes photo)

== Chart position ==
- UK Singles Chart No. 14

== History ==
"Don't Stop That Crazy Rhythm" was a Top 20 single for Modern Romance. It was the released during the David Jaymes / Michael J. Mullins era. It reached No. 14 on the UK chart in 1983 and can be found on Modern Romance's two hit albums, Trick of the Light (1983) and Party Tonight (1983). "Don't Stop That Crazy Rhythm" also made an appearance on their farewell single, "Best Mix of Our Lives" (1985) with four other singles: "Best Years of Our Lives", "High Life", "Everybody Salsa", and "Ay Ay Ay Ay Moosey". The 12-inch vinyl came with a special fold-out poster of Michael J. Mullins and David Jaymes.

The 12-inch B-side, "Just My Imagination (Running Away with Me)", is a cover version, which can also be found on the Modern Romance compilation albums Party Tonight (1983) and Modern Romance: The Platinum Collection (2006). "Don't Stop That Crazy Rhythm" was written by Modern Romance founder member, David Jaymes. It can also be found on the Japanese compilation, Juanita (1983).

== Genre ==
"Don't Stop That Crazy Rhythm" is a pop music single with elements of Afro-Cuban and mambo, which presented a marked change from the traditional salsa music style of Modern Romance. The song features the distinctive trumpet and horn sounds of John Du Prez.

== Personnel ==
- Michael J. Mullins – vocals
- David Jaymes – bass guitar
- Robbie Jaymes – synthesizer
- Paul Gendler – guitar
- John Du Prez – trumpet
- Andy Kyriacou – drums
- Tony Visconti – producer
