= Let's Rock (festival) =

British music festival

- Genre: Pop; new wave; synth-pop; rock
- Locations: England: Cookham; Essex; Shrewsbury; Southampton; Exeter; Leeds; Sunderland; Norwich; Liverpool; Elsewhere: Scotland; Belfast, Northern Ireland; Wales
- Years active: 2009–present
- Website: www.letsrock80s.com

Let's Rock is an annual family-friendly, 1980s-oriented music festival held throughout the United Kingdom. Since the first festival in 2009, it has grown every year to become the UK's largest festival for 1980s music, expanding to 14 locations.

== Let's Rock the Moor! 2009 ==
The first Let's Rock the Moor! festival was held in Cookham Moor on 4 May 2009 and featured Nick Heyward. It closed the Cookham Festival and was attended by 1,200 guests. Other acts on the bill were Soul'd Out, Temposhark, and the Plants and Burdock. Nick Beggs from Kajagoogoo played bass guitar.

== Let's Rock the Moor! 2010 ==
The second Let's Rock the Moor! festival was held on 22 May 2010 and was attended by about 2,000 festival goers. The headlined acts were Howard Jones and Haircut 100.

Haircut 100 reunited for this performance. Other bands on the bill were High School Musical, Girls Alouder, Soul'd Out, the Quotes, the Mean Red Spiders, Burdock, RedRoots and Distant Origins.

£7,600 was raised for local charities along with £6,000 for the Wooden Spoon charity.

== Let's Rock the Moor! 2011 ==
The third Let's Rock the Moor! festival was held on 21 May 2011. The capacity of the event increased to 4,500 and was a sell-out. Headlined acts for the festival were Rick Astley, T'Pau, the Real Thing and Curiosity Killed the Cat.

Other bands on the bill were the Mean Red Spiders, the Quotes, Who Are You?, the Stereosonics, Sintax, Izzi Stone and Hustle & Cuss.

== Let's Rock the Moor! 2012 ==
The fourth Let's Rock the Moor! festival moved to a new larger site on Marsh Meadow to accommodate an increased capacity of 6,500 and was also a sell-out. The festival was held on 13 May 2012. The headlined acts were Billy Ocean, Go West, Heaven 17, Boney M, Toyah, China Crisis, Nick Heyward and Modern Romance.

Other bands on the bill were the Fortunate, Paul Child Band and the Mean Red Spiders.

The new larger site saw an increase in the amount of entertainment on offer for children which included a circus and indoor cinema, as well as rides such as bumper boats, bubbles of fun, chair-o-planes, banana boat, the big slide and dodgems. Dave Benson Phillips (CBBC/CITV/Disney Channel) performed his Guitar Music Set on the main stage. Pat Sharp introduced the evening headline acts. Up to £20,000 was expected to be raised for the festival's nominated charities, Wooden Spoon and The Link Foundation.

The festival was listed at number 3 in The Telegraph's guide to the Top 100 Music Festivals of April–September 2012.

== Let's Rock 2013 ==
The fifth Let's Rock the Moor! festival in Cookham took place on 18 May 2013. The line-up included Tony Hadley, Bananarama, Howard Jones, Midge Ure, Five Star, Rozalla, Imagination, Altered Images and Brother Beyond. An additional second stage called The Paddock Stage featured local bands.

A new Bristol portion was added which took place on 8 June. This venue had Billy Ocean, Altered Images, Howard Jones, ABC, Nick Heyward, Go West, the Real Thing, Modern Romance, Brother Beyond, and Owen Paul.

== Let's Rock 2014 ==
Due to the Cookham and Bristol concerts being sell-outs in the previous year, the 2014 year of the Let's Rock festival added two more locations: Leeds and Southampton. The Bristol portion also moved to a larger venue–Ashton Court Estate–and increased to a three-day event.

Leeds

The Leeds portion took place in Temple Newsam on 21 June. The line-up was Bananarama, Kim Wilde, Howard Jones, ABC, Alexander O'Neal, Nick Heyward, the Real Thing, Nik Kershaw, Altered Images, Brother Beyond, Jaki Graham, and Then Jerico.

Southampton

In Southampton Common on 12 July, the line-up was Billy Ocean, Bananarama, Howard Jones, ABC, Go West, Nick Heyward, the Real Thing, Heaven 17, Altered Images, Brother Beyond, Jaki Graham, and Then Jerico.

Bristol

Friday	Saturday	Sunday
Then Jerico; Brother Beyond	Bananarama; Tony Hadley; Belinda Carlisle; Alexander O'Neal; Go West; Boney M; Midge Ure; Heaven 17; Jaki Graham; Doctor and the Medics; Sonia; T'Pau	Level 42; Rick Astley; ABC; China Crisis; Kim Wilde; Imagination; Soul II Soul; Blow Monkeys; Johnny Hates Jazz; Nik Kershaw; Captain Sensible; Toyah

Cookham

The line-up included Big Country, Alexander O'Neal, Then Jerico, Doctor and the Medics, T'Pau, Sonia, Nik Kershaw and ABC before Kim Wilde performed as the headline act.

== Let's Rock 2015 ==
The seventh Let's Rock festival introduced concerts in Exeter and London.

Exeter

This festival took place in Powderham Castle on 4 July. The line-up consisted of Tom Bailey, Billy Ocean, Bananarama, ABC, Howard Jones, Midge Ure, Go West, Five Star, Nick Heyward, Nik Kershaw, the Real Thing, Altered Images, Brother Beyond, and Jive Bunny and the Mastermixers.

London

The first Let's Rock London! was at the Queen Elizabeth Olympic Park on 27 June. Performers included Bananarama, Rick Astley, Kim Wilde, Howard Jones, Go West, Nick Heyward, Five Star, Sinitta, Sonia, Brother Beyond, and China Crisis.

Cookham

Capacity for 2015 increased from 6,500 to 9,999 but the organisers withdrew an application to make it a two-day event.

The line-up included Samantha Fox, Bucks Fizz, the Christians, the Blow Monkeys, the Selecter, Odyssey, Betty Boo, Hot Chocolate, Roland Gift and Rick Astley before Level 42 performed as the headline act.

Bristol

Friday	Saturday	Sunday
Go West; Doctor and the Medics; Brother Beyond; Jive Bunny and the Mastermixers	Thompson Twins’ Tom Bailey; Rick Astley; Sister Sledge; Jimmy Somerville; ABC; Big Country; Five Star; The Beat; Betty Boo; Chas & Dave; Odyssey; Samantha Fox; Owen Paul	Boomtown Rats; Howard Jones; Roland Gift's Fine Young Cannibals; Nick Heyward; The Real Thing; Hot Chocolate; From The Jam; The South; China Crisis; Aswad; Modern Romance; Black Box

Elsewhere

Other events took place in Leeds and Southampton.

== Let's Rock 2016 ==
The eighth Let's Rock festival announced a new venue, Birmingham.

Birmingham

On 11 June at Sandwell Valley Country Park, the line-up was Holly Johnson, Kim Wilde, Jimmy Somerville, Tiffany, ABC, Go West, Midge Ure, Nik Kershaw, Five Star, Fuzzbox Altered Images, Doctor and the Medics, and Brother Beyond.

Bristol

This was once again a three-day event from Friday to Sunday.

Saturday	Sunday
Holly Johnson; Shalamar; Jason Donovan; Midge Ure; Snap!; Sinitta; Blancmange; Chesney Hawkes; The Selecter; Katrina Leskanich; Hazel O'Connor; Ex-Simple Minds	UB40; Earth Wind & Fire Experience feat Al McKay; Soul II Soul; Paul Young; Jimmy Somerville; Kid Creole And The Coconuts; Hue And Cry; Ex King; Living In A Box; Limahl; Cutting Crew; Wang Chung

Elsewhere

Other festivals took place in Cookham, Leeds, Exeter, Southampton, and London. The line-up included acts such as those above and Johnny Hates Jazz, Black Box, Aswad, Belinda Carlisle, and the Human League.

== Let's Rock 2017 ==
The ninth Let's Rock festival year added two new locations: Shrewsbury and Norwich.

Shrewsbury

Taking place in Quarry Park on 27 May 2017, the event hosted Billy Ocean, ABC, Tony Hadley, Heaven 17, Nick Heyward, Nik Kershaw, T'Pau, the Real Thing, Clare Grogan of Altered Images, Brother Beyond, and Jaki Graham.

Norwich

On 1 July, Earlham Park in Norwich welcomed Chesney Hawkes, Boney M, Bananarama, Howard Jones, Captain Sensible, Jaki Graham, Belinda Carlisle, Nik Kershaw, Go West, Midge Ure, and Kim Wilde.

Cookham

Let's Rock the Moor 2017 took place in Marsh Meadow on 20 May. The event sold out of its 10,000 tickets available. The line-up included A Flock of Seagulls, Howard Jones, Living in a Box, From the Jam, the Beat, the Blockheads, Go West, and Sister Sledge before OMD performed as the headline act. A portion of the proceeds went to the Link Foundation, Child Bereavement UK, and Wooden Spoon charities.

Bristol

This event at Ashton Court Estate was a three-day event from 2–4 June. This was the first time a line-up included a day of only 1990s-oriented music. The line-up was as listed:

Friday	Saturday	Sunday
Midge Ure; Modern Romance	Gloria Gaynor; Village People; Howard Jones; Kim Wilde; Tiffany; Nick Heyward; Heaven 17; Nik Kershaw; T'Pau; Technotronic; A Flock Of Seagulls; Captain Sensible; Black Lace	Happy Mondays; Lightning Seeds; Cast; Stereo MC's; Toploader; Atomic Kitten; EMF; Bewitched; Space; Damage; Republica; Shola Ama; Baby D; Sl2 Live PA

Leeds

Temple Newsam, on 17 June, hosted the Human League, ABC, Kid Creole and the Coconuts, Technotronic, Hue and Cry, Hazel O'Connor, Imagination, Doctor and the Medics, From the Jam, Roland Gift, Howard Jones, Tony Hadley, and A Flock of Seagulls.

Exeter

Powderham Castle featured Big Country, Toyah, Jaki Graham, Tony Hadley, Howard Jones, Belinda Carlisle, Jason Donovan, Chesney Hawkes, Imagination, From the Jam, Hazel O'Connor, Katrina Leskanich (of Katrina and the Waves), and Level 42.

Southampton

This location had the Human League, Living in a Box, Katrina, Tony Hadley, Howard Jones, Hue and Cry, Hazel O'Connor, Imagination, Belinda Carlisle, Nick Heyward, Chesney Hawkes, and Kid Creole and the Coconuts.

London

The final date was in Clapham Common on 15 July. Performances were by the Human League, Chesney Hawkes, Boney M, Sister Sledge, Howard Jones, T'Pau, Roland Gift, Matt Bianco, Hazel O'Connor, Katrina, Jaki Graham, Toyah, and Heaven 17.

== Let's Rock 2018 ==
The tenth Let's Rock festival introduced two new venues: Sunderland and Scotland.

Sunderland

This event took place in Herrington Park on 9 June. The line-up included Tony Hadley, Kim Wilde, ABC, Heaven 17, Midge Ure, Go West, Nick Heyward, Five Star, Nik Kershaw, the Real Thing, Altered Images, and Modern Romance.

Scotland

In Dalkeith Country Park on 23 June, performers included Billy Ocean, Marc Almond, Tony Hadley, ABC, Nick Heyward, Heaven 17, Midge Ure, Go West, Nik Kershaw, Katrina, Altered Images, ABC, Annabella Lwin, Fuzzbox, Go West, Hazell Dean, Katrina, Nick Heyward, Peter Coyle, Black Lace, Brother Beyond, and Modern Romance.

Elsewhere

Other performances took place in Cookham, London, Leeds, Southampton, Exeter, Bristol, Shrewsbury, and Norwich. Along with those listed above, performers also included Wendy James, Clare Grogan, Heather Small, Kim Appleby, Tom Bailey, and Adam Ant.

== Let's Rock 2019 ==
For the 10th anniversary, the Let's Rock festival introduced four new locations: Liverpool, Wales, Essex, and Belfast.

Liverpool

The event took place at Croxteth Hall on 27 July. The line-up consisted of the Human League, Tony Hadley, Marc Almond, Midge Ure, Go West, Nick Heyward, Five Star, Nik Kershaw, Roland Gift, T’Pau, the Real Thing, China Crisis, Altered Images, Belouis Some and Sonia.

Wales

In Tredegar Park, the line-up was Billy Ocean, Tony Hadley, Go West, Midge Ure, Jason Donovan, Nik Kershaw, Nick Heyward, Toyah, From the Jam, Heaven 17, Altered Images, the Real Thing, Brother Beyond, Belouis Some, Owen Paul, Jennie "Belle Star" Matthias, Musical Youth, Westworld, and Black Lace. It took place on 1 June.

Essex

On 7 September, Hylands Estate hosted Status Quo, Jimmy Somerville, Tony Hadley, Go West, Midge Ure, Nick Heyward, Nik Kershaw, Heaven 17, the Real Thing, Betty Boo, China Crisis, Sonia, Brother Beyond, Belouis Some, Jennie "Belle Star" Matthias, Owen Paul, Westworld, Black Lace and Musical Youth.

Belfast

Located at the Boucher Playing Fields on 3 August, the performers held were Billy Ocean, Tony Hadley, Marc Almond, Tom Bailey, Midge Ure, Go West, Nick Heyward, Nik Kershaw, Heaven 17, Cutting Crew, Altered Images, Sonia, Brother Beyond, Owen Paul, Belouis Some, Jennie "Belle Star" Matthias, Owen Paul, Westworld, Black Lace and Musical Youth.

Elsewhere

Other events will take place in Cookham, Norwich, Sunderland, Scotland, Leeds, Exeter, Southampton, and Shrewsbury. Acts included those listed above with Shalamar, Belinda Carlisle, Hot Chocolate, Snap!, Chesney Hawkes, Kim Wilde, Kim Appleby, Thomas Dolby, Limahl, Hugh Cornwell, Jaki Graham, Captain Sensible, and Johnny Hates Jazz.
