= Peter Howarth =

English musician (born 1960)

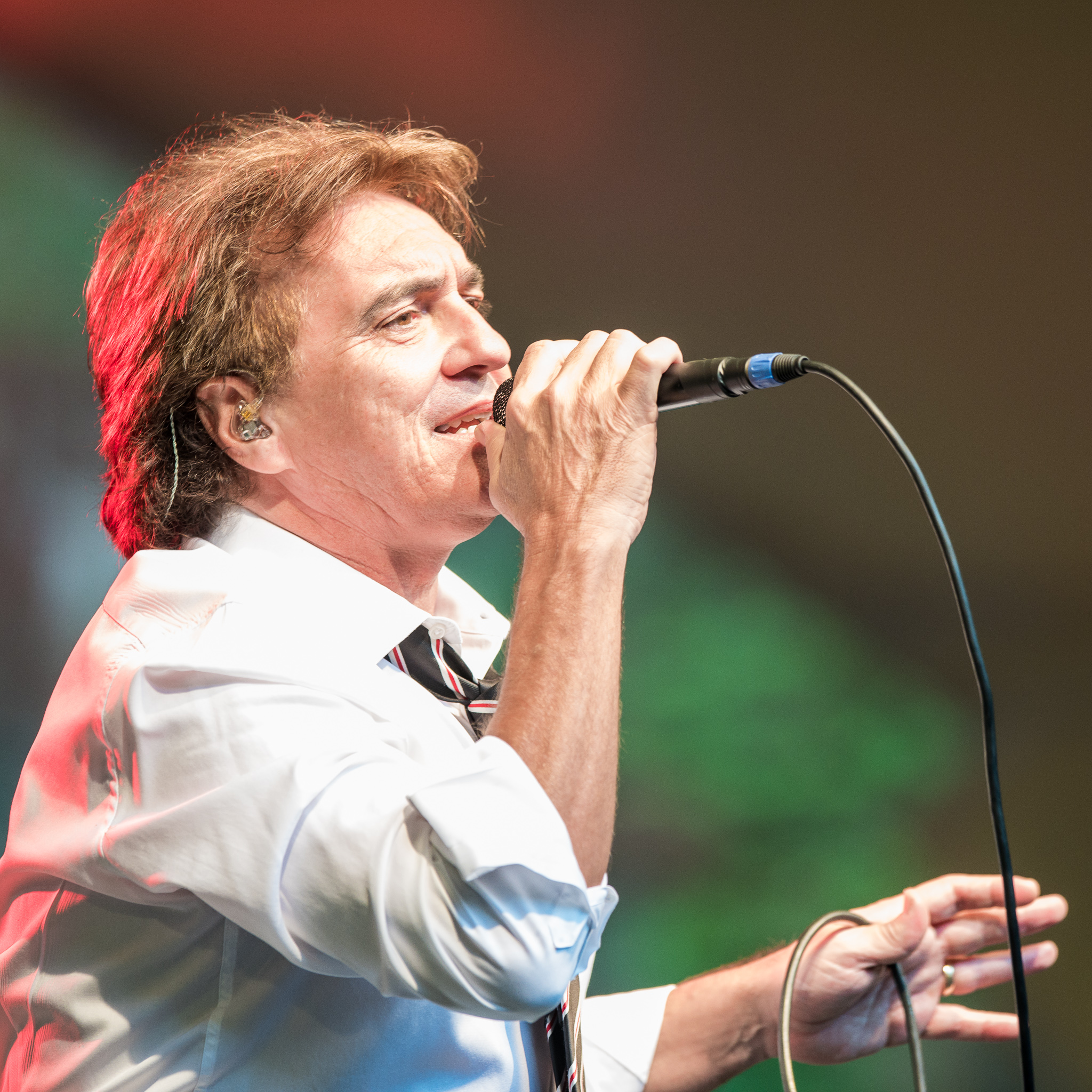
- Howarth performing with The Hollies in 2017

Background information
- Born: 3 May 1960 (age 65); Blackpool, England
- Genres: Rock; pop
- Occupations: Singer; musician
- Instruments: Vocals; guitar
- Years active: 1980–present
- Member of: The Hollies
- Website: www.peterhowarth.com

Peter Howarth (born 3 May 1960) is an English musician, who is the current lead singer of the English band The Hollies. He also has a career as solo artist and used to be a backing singer. In 2014 he released the CD album Evermore featuring his acoustic version of "He Ain't Heavy - He's My Brother".

== Performing career ==
Howarth has worked with many artists, including Cliff Richard and The Who, as a touring and session musician.

Howarth played Roy Orbison in the musical Only The Lonely at London's Piccadilly and Whitehall Theatre's to critical acclaim.

He later co-operated with a band called "Reflections of a Rock and Roll Tour" formed by Moody Blues drummer Gordy Marshall and Moody Blues/Hollies keyboard player Paul Bliss.

In 2005, he replaced Carl Wayne as a vocalist in The Hollies. In 1999, Carl Wayne had stepped in when the band's original singer Allan Clarke retired. In addition to providing main vocals on the Hollies' classic hits in live shows, Howarth is well known for his solo acoustic versions of "Here I Go Again", the Bruce Springsteen song "Sandy", and "I Can't Tell the Bottom From the Top". In 2014 he performed "He Ain't Heavy - He's My Brother" at Goodison Park to mark 25 years since the football disaster in Hillsborough.

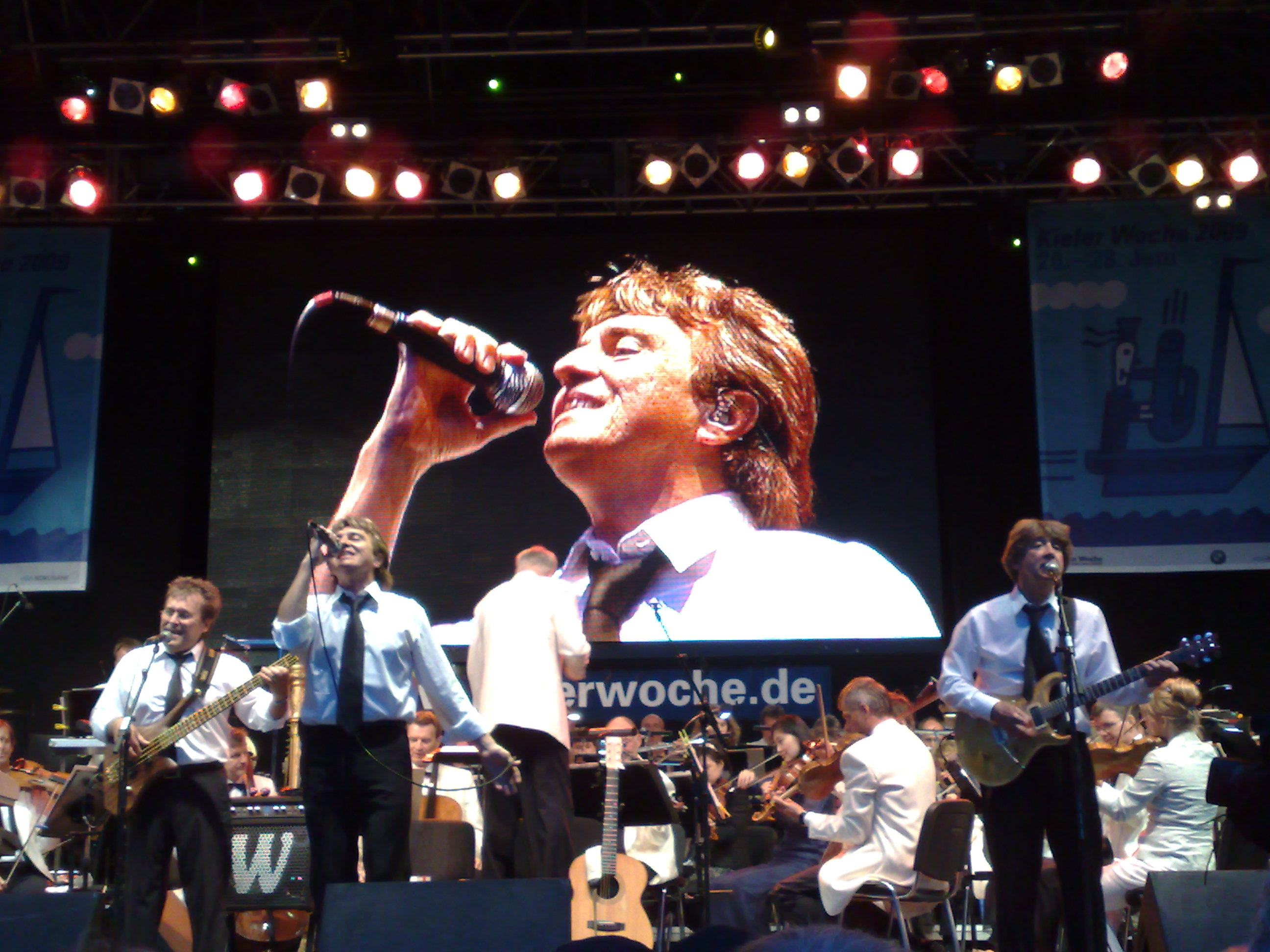
Peter Howarth performing with The Hollies and Kiel Philharmonic Orchestra in 2009

In 2015 Howarth joined forces with Mick Wilson (ex-10cc) and Pete Lincoln (then with The Sweet) and together they became FRONTM3N. They tour showcasing songs of The Hollies, 10cc, The Sweet, Cliff Richard and Roy Orbison, as well as their own original material. Their album, All For One, was released on CD and vinyl in 2019.

== Composing and recording career ==
Peter Howarth co-wrote the West End musical, Robin, Prince of Sherwood, with 10cc guitarist Rick Fenn, which was commissioned and produced by Bill Kenwright. He also wrote songs with Fenn under the name 'Circle of 4'. They published a CD album called and still I fly... featuring 12 original songs and was released in 2020. He sang backing vocals on the AOR album by Giant: Last of the Runaways, released in 1989. The single "I'll see you in my dreams" reached 20 on the US Hot 100. In 2012, Howarth recorded "Last Goodbye" with Michael J. Mullins, with whom he had worked backing Cliff Richard.

Howarth provides lead vocals on The Hollies' two most-recent studio albums, Staying Power (2006), and Then, Now, Always (2009/2010) and the live album We Got The Tunes in 2013. Howarth was featured with live recorded versions of the Hollies' hit "The Baby" and the 2009 song "I Would Fly", and the studio version of the song "Then, Now, Always" on the Top 30 charting album, Midas Touch, in 2010. In 2014 he was featured with three songs on the Hollies' 3-CD box 50 at Fifty. One of these was a new song, "Skylarks", which he composed with Hollies drummer Bobby Elliott and Steve Lee Vickers.

Howarth fronted The Hollies on their concert DVD, Special Live Edition, featuring live clips from the Sports Palais, Antwerp and the Café de Paris, London. Three studio films from Shepperton Studios were also included. (Modern English, 2007) "I Would Fly", "She'd Kill for Me", "The Air That I Breathe" and "He Ain't Heavy - He's My Brother" were filmed for QVC TV in 2010.

He also wrote and/or arranged eight tracks on his 2014 CD album, Evermore. Some of them have been performed on Christian TV programs.

In 2014, he wrote and performed a duet alongside actress Jenny Seagrove called The Main Chance, as part of a cause for the Mane Chance Sanctuary which Seagrove founded.
