= Leslie Carter =

American pop singer (1986–2012)

- Carter in 2004
- Born: Leslie Barbara Carter; June 6, 1986; Tampa, Florida, U.S.
- Died: January 31, 2012 (aged 25); Westfield, New York, U.S.
- Resting place: Chautauqua Cemetery, Chautauqua, New York, U.S.
- Other name: Leslie Barbara Ashton
- Occupation: Singer
- Years active: 1999–2012
- Spouse: Mike Ashton (m. 2008)
- Children: 1
- Relatives: Nick Carter (brother); Aaron Carter (brother)
- Musical career
- Genre: Pop
- Label: DreamWorks
- Formerly of: The Other Half

Leslie Barbara Ashton (née Carter; June 6, 1986 – January 31, 2012) was an American pop singer. In 2001, she debuted through DreamWorks Records with the single "Like Wow!". Originally set to release her debut studio album through the label, it was later canceled. From 2006 to 2009, Carter was a member of the band she founded, the Other Half.

== Career ==
=== Early recordings ===
Carter signed a record deal with DreamWorks Records in 1999 and began recording her debut album. This album was set for release in June 2000, but it was delayed because DreamWorks wanted to test Carter's fan base before releasing the album in order to ensure its success. Her single "Like Wow!" appeared on the Shrek soundtrack and received minor radio airplay, peaking at No. 99 on the Billboard Hot 100. Her debut album Like Wow! was set for release on April 10, 2001. However, DreamWorks later canceled the release. The cancellation followed a number of reported problems from the set of her debut music video. Promo copies later became available online, and "Metal Mike" Saunders of The Village Voice described it as "the best bubblegum album of the entire '97–Y2K era." The album also included a cover of "They Don't Know" by Kirsty MacColl.

=== The Other Half ===
Carter started a small club tour in Canada in December 2005, and had a showcase in New York City on January 19, 2006, with hopes it would lead to a new record deal. The songs performed on this tour had her abandoning her bubblegum pop roots for a more mature, pop rock-oriented sound. Carter co-wrote her material with High Holy Days guitarist Dave Thompson. In late 2006, Carter founded the band The Other Half, which included her backup musicians Mike Ashton, DJ Porter, Jose Batista, Casey Clowater, Paul Davidson, Daniel Resanovic and Dave Thompson. The final line-up consisted of Carter (vocals), Ashton (drums), Jason Eldon (electric guitar), and Sean Smit (bass guitar and back-up vocals). In September 2009, the band mutually decided to split up.

Carter was seen writing music and performing her own songs for her siblings on the family's reality show House of Carters.

== Personal life and family ==
Leslie Carter was born in Tampa, Florida, the third of five children of Jane Eleonora Schneck (1959–) (née Spaulding, previously Carter) and Robert Carter (1952–2017). She was born at the Garden Villa Retirement Home, where the Carter family were living and working at the time. She was the older sister of singer Aaron Carter (1987–2022) and his twin sister Angel Conrad (née Carter) and the younger sister of Bobbie Jean Carter (1982–2023) and Nick Carter (born 1980). She also had an older half-sister named Ginger (1972–2023) and a younger half-brother named Kaden (born 2005). On September 12, 2008, Leslie Carter married her boyfriend Mike Ashton and moved to Toronto, Ontario, where she gave birth to a daughter in 2011.

Leslie Carter experienced depression and mental illness. Prior to her death Leslie was planning to go to rehab for her addiction with help from Aaron. In 2019, her widower, Mike Ashton, was granted a restraining order against her brother Aaron. Later, Aaron claimed his sister raped him repeatedly over a period of three years, from the ages of 10 to 13.

=== Death ===
On January 31, 2012, at age 25, Carter, who had complained of feeling ill after falling in the shower, was found unresponsive at the home of Robert and her stepmother Ginger Elrod Carter, in Mayville, New York, while she was visiting them. Leslie had fallen asleep after she fell in the shower and did not wake up. Leslie Carter was pronounced dead on arrival at Westfield Memorial Hospital in Westfield, New York.

While not attributing a cause of death, a Chautauqua County, New York, police incident report and supplemental "Overdose Follow Up" report said Carter had an overdose and was taking the prescription medications olanzapine (Zyprexa), cyclobenzaprine (a muscle relaxant) and alprazolam (Xanax). 10 years later, Leslie's younger brother Aaron also died of a multiple drug overdose involving Xanax. Leslie's daughter was 10 months old at the time of her mother's death. Her funeral took place at Freay Funeral Home in Mayville, New York. Nick Carter did not attend the funeral; according to Nick, he stayed away because his family blamed him for Leslie's death and wanted him to be absent from the funeral. Leslie Carter is buried in Chautauqua Cemetery in Chautauqua, New York.

== Discography ==
=== Albums ===
- Like Wow! – unreleased (2001)

=== Singles ===
- "I Need to Hear It from You" – promotional single
- "Like Wow!" – No. 99 US Billboard Hot 100

== Filmography ==
- House of Carters (2006) (TV)
