= Leyton Buzzards =

English rock band

The Leyton Buzzards a.k.a. The Buzzards were an English rock band, active between 1976 and 1980, best known for their minor hit single, "Saturday Night (Beneath the Plastic Palm Trees)".

== Career ==
The band took their name from their home town of Leyton, an area of East London, punning upon the name of the Bedfordshire town Leighton Buzzard. They were initially a pub rock band, but soon adapted to punk rock/new wave. Their debut single, "19 and Mad", was released in 1977 by Small Wonder Records. They won a high-profile "battle of the bands" competition organized by BBC Radio 1 and The Sun, resulting in a major-label deal with Chrysalis Records. The first fruits of this deal, "Saturday Night (Beneath the Plastic Palm Trees)", reached Number 53 in the UK Singles Chart in March 1979, spending five weeks in the chart, and led to an appearance on Top of the Pops.

The band shortened their name to The Buzzards for the 1979 single "We Make a Noise" and the album Jellied Eels to Record Deals, before reverting to The Leyton Buzzards for their final single, "Can't Get used to Losing You".

They recorded four sessions for BBC Radio One's John Peel between July 1978 and January 1980.

The band changed direction in 1980, with all four members (Deane, Jaymes, Austin and Gainsbrough) renaming the act Modern Romance. This "new" group had a much more electronic sound than the Buzzards, but their first two singles flopped, missing the charts completely. At that point, Modern Romance was retooled, with Austin leaving and Deane and Jaymes adopting a salsa-tinged pop style that was again a total change of direction. Modern Romance went on to have a number of UK chart hits, though Gainsborough and later Deane both left the group during its period of greatest popularity.

== Line-up ==
- Kevin Steptoe (a.k.a. Gray Mare) (drums) - later Tony Gainsborough
- Vernon Austin (a.k.a. Chip Monk) (guitar, vocals)
- David Jaymes (a.k.a. Dave Deprave) (bass, vocals)
- Geoff Deane (a.k.a. Nick Nayme) (lead vocals)
- Milton Reame-James (keyboards) – previously of Cockney Rebel

== Discography ==
=== Albums ===
- Jellied Eels to Record Deals (1979), Chrysalis (as The Buzzards)

=== Singles ===
- "19 and Mad" (1978), Small Wonder
- "Saturday Night (Beneath the Plastic Palm Trees)" (1979), Chrysalis - UK No. 53
- "I'm Hanging Around" (1979), Chrysalis b/w B1. "I Don't Want to Go to Art School", B2. "No Dry Ice or Flying Pigs"
- "We Make a Noise" (1979), Chrysalis (as The Buzzards)
- "Can't Get Used to Losing You" (1980), WEA

== See also ==
- Modern Romance
