= Everybody Salsa =

Single by Modern Romance

from the album Adventures in Clubland
- Released: 1981
- Genre: Salsa, pop, tropical
- Label: WEA
- Songwriter(s): Geoff Deane, David Jaymes
- Producer(s): Geoff Deane, David Jaymes, Norman Mighell

Modern Romance singles chronology
"Tonight" (1981)	"Everybody Salsa" (1981)	"Ay Ay Ay Ay Moosey" (1981)

"Everybody Salsa" is a song by British band Modern Romance, released as a 7-inch and 12-inch single by WEA in 1981. It was also released in the United States, Benelux, Germany, France, Italy and Mexico. The song was produced by David Jaymes, Geoff Deane and Norman Mighell. It was their first entry into the charts, reaching No. 12 on the UK Singles Chart and No. 19 on the Irish Singles Chart.

== Formats ==
7-inch single

- Everybody Salsa
- Salsa Rappsody

12-inch single

- Everybody Salsa/Salsa Rappsody [Discomix]
- Salsa Rappsody [Dub Discomix]

12-inch single

- Everybody Salsa/Salsa Rappsody [Extended Discomix]
- Salsa Rappsody [Dub Discomix]

12-inch promo single (U.S.)

- Everybody Salsa
- Bring on the Funkateers

12-inch single (Mexico)

- Everybody Salsa [Todo Mundo Salsa]
- Salsa Rappsody [Rapsodia En Salsa]

12-inch single (Benelux)

- Everybody Salsa/Salsa Rappsody [Extended Discomix]
- Salsa Rappsody [Dub Discomix]

7-inch single (Germany)

- Everybody Salsa
- Salsa Rappsody

7-inch single (Benelux)

- Everybody Salsa
- Salsa Rappsody

7-inch single (Italy)

- Everybody Salsa
- Salsa Rappsody

7-inch single

- Everybody Salsa
- Salsa Rappsody

== History ==
"Everybody Salsa" was originally a UK hit for Modern Romance in 1981 and was included on their debut album, Adventures in Clubland (1981) as part of the Clubland Mix along with "Ay Ay Ay Ay Moosey", "Salsa Rappsody", and "Moose on the Loose". It was one of the few Modern Romance records to feature drummer, Tony Gainsborough. The single also made its way onto the compilation albums Party Tonight (1983) and Modern Romance: The Platinum Collection (2006). It was also a part of their farewell single, Best Mix of Our Lives (1985), an anthology single of the band's biggest hits.

== Other versions ==
- "O Superman"/"Everybody Salsa" – Laurie Anderson / Modern Romance [Italy; Spain] (1982)
- "Everybody Salsa" b/w "Can You Move" '88 – David Jaymes (1988)

== Personnel ==
- Geoff Deane – vocals
- David Jaymes – bass guitar
- Robbie Jaymes – synthesizer
- Paul Gendler – guitar
- Tony Gainsborough – drums
- David Jaymes, Geoff Deane, Norman Mighell – Producer (music)
