= Modern Romance (band) =

British pop band

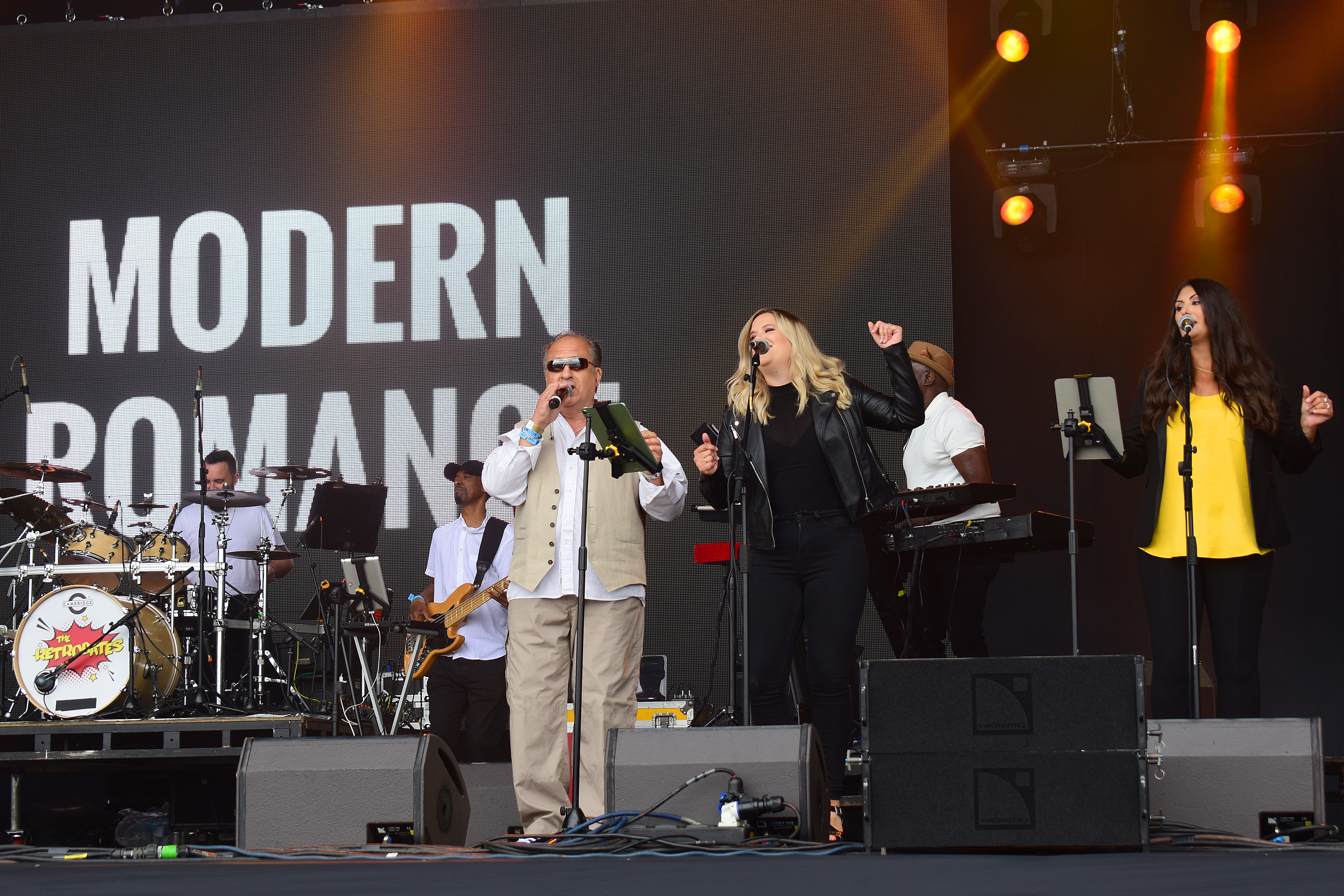
- Andy Kyriacou of Modern Romance performing at Let's Rock Liverpool, 31 July 2021. Photograph by Andrew D. Hurley

Background information
- Origin: London, England
- Genres: Pop, new wave
- Years active: 1980–1985, 1999–present
- Labels: WEA, RCA, Ronco, Wounded Bird Records, Nub
- Members: Andy Kyriacou; Matt Earnshaw; Natalie Kyriacou; Steve Etherington; Oli Silk
- Past members: Geoff Deane; David Jaymes; Robbie Jaymes; Paul Gendler; John Du Prez; Michael J. Mullins; Kevin Sutherland; Peter J Pinto
- Website: www.modernromance.uk

Modern Romance is a British pop music band that found popularity in the early 1980s. Formed in 1980 by previous members of an earlier group, the Leyton Buzzards, the band achieved a string of UK chart hits before the original group broke up in 1985. Andy Kyriacou reformed the band in 1999 who continue to perform the group's music.

== Band history ==
Geoffrey Deane and David Jaymes formed Modern Romance in 1980, having previously been the mainstays of the punk parody band the Leyton Buzzards which they formed in 1977.

The band split up in 1980 though Deane and Jaymes continued working together, embracing the burgeoning electronic style of dance music that was becoming popular in London clubs at the time. They found a new manager and created a limited company called Business Art Productions, and signed to WEA. In 1980, their first release, eponymously titled "Modern Romance", was unsuccessful. After a second unsuccessful single, "Tonight", the band then opted to lessen the predominantly electronic sound in favour of a Latin-American dance style with emphasis on bass, percussion and brass. They recruited trumpet player John Du Prez into their new line-up. The band released a new single, "Everybody Salsa" in summer 1981, which reached the UK Top 20. However, prior to the release, they recruited a new drummer, Andy Kyriacou, who began promoting the single with the band, and set up their first personal appearance in a club.

They followed this later in the year with similarly themed "Ay Ay Ay Ay Moosey", which reached the UK Top 10. In the US they scored a number 2 hit on the Billboard Dance chart with "Can You Move", a mostly rap variation of "Everybody Salsa". After further UK Top 40 hits with "Queen of the Rapping Scene" and a cover of the 1955 hit "Cherry Pink And Apple Blossom White", Deane departed the band in 1982 to pursue solo projects.

Michael J. Mullins took over the mantle of lead vocalist, and their next release saw the band reach their highest UK chart position with "Best Years of Our Lives" in late 1982. Further hits followed in 1983: "High Life" (UK No. 8), "Don't Stop That Crazy Rhythm" (UK No. 14), and the ballad "Walking in the Rain" (UK No. 7). Both "Best Years of Our Lives" and "Walking in the Rain" earned Silver discs. Despite being regularly featured in teen pin-up magazines, the band's commercial hot streak waned and further singles were less successful. The band released a compilation album for the Christmas 1983 market entitled Party Tonight. Though it only peaked at No. 45 in the UK, it became their most successful album and was certified gold for sales in excess of 100,000 copies within six weeks of release.

John Du Prez then left the band, and after disagreements with their record company, WEA, the band signed with RCA in 1984. This brought about a change of image – from bright coloured suits and wedge hairstyles to long hair and leather jackets. The band released a new single, a cover of The Temptations' 1971 hit "Just My Imagination (Running Away With Me)", but the single was not a success. Modern Romance released a final album, Burn It!, in 1985. The album was received poorly and the band called it quits after releasing the stand-alone single "Tarzan Boy" – a cover of the Baltimora hit from earlier that year – and an anthology mix of their biggest selling songs titled "Best Mix of Our Lives" (also 1985).

== Post career ==
After leaving Modern Romance, former lead vocalist Geoff Deane reappeared in 1983 as 'Geoff Deane & The Valley Girls' to release the single "Navy Lark", then again for the solo "What About Romance", and he also wrote "You Think You're A Man" for Divine. Deane later became a scriptwriter and television producer, scripting for television programmes such as Birds of a Feather, Babes in the Wood, Friday Night with Jonathan Ross, Chef!, Last Man Standing, and A Many-Splintered Thing. In 2005, he wrote the film Kinky Boots starring Chiwetel Ejiofor, and a year later It's a Boy Girl Thing for Elton John's Rocket Pictures.

David Jaymes has since moved into the management and consultancy side of the music industry. He worked as the music supervisor on the film Fascination (2004) starring Jacqueline Bisset and James Naughton. He has also worked again with John Du Prez, composing music for commercials and feature films. Jaymes has managed artists such as Sinéad O'Connor, Justin Adams, Miles Hunt of The Wonder Stuff, Republica and Drum Club. He has also worked as consultant for Harry Nilsson, Jimmy Webb, George Fenton, and Chuck Mangione. In 2010, he worked with a host of musicians on the Haiti earthquake disaster single (a cover version of "I Put a Spell on You"), including Shane MacGowan, Nick Cave, Chrissie Hynde and Johnny Depp.

In 1999, Andy Kyriacou reformed Modern Romance with a new line-up, joining the burgeoning British 1980s revival scene. The new line-up features no original band members (Kyriacou himself had first appeared on the Modern Romance single, "Ay Ay Ay Ay Moosey", although he had remained their drummer until the band split in 1985). In 2002, the new line-up released the album Back on Track, which consisted mostly of re-recorded Modern Romance hits. Back on Track was also released as Moves 2 Fast, with a slightly different track listing. Kyriacou's Modern Romance continues to play the 1980s festival circuit and appeared as the opening act at the 2010 Rewind Festival in Henley-on-Thames, which also included Boy George, Rick Astley, Level 42, T'Pau, Kajagoogoo and Heaven 17.

2012 saw the band play Let's Rock the Moor!, a boutique festival in Cookham, Berkshire, with other 1980s acts including Go West, Toyah, Nick Heyward and Billy Ocean. During their set they aired one of their new songs, "Rhythm Is My Lover", from the forthcoming album The 7th Day (penned by Kyriacou and guitarist Peter J Pinto).

In 2019, Kyriacou successfully defeated an attempt by Geoff Deane to appropriate the band's name by trademarking it, despite his absence from the band for 36 years. The Intellectual Property Office ruled that Deane's involvement with the band ended in 1982 and with it any claim to the name.

== Band members ==
=== 1980s members ===
- Geoff Deane (born 10 December 1954, London) - vocals
- David Jaymes (born 28 November 1954, London) - bass
- Robbie Jaymes (born 3 October 1961, London) - keyboards
- Paul Gendler (born 11 August 1960, London) - guitar
- Tony Gainsbrough (1980 - 1981) - drums (played on "Modern Romance", "Tonight" and Everybody Salsa")
- Andy Kyriacou (born 18 April 1958, London) (1981 - 1985) - drums (played on all recordings except "Modern Romance", "Tonight" and "Everybody Salsa")
- John Du Prez (born Trevor Jones, 14 December 1946, Sheffield) – trumpet (featured from "Everybody Salsa" and subsequent recordings)
- Michael J. Mullins (born 9 November 1953) – vocals (after departure of Deane)

=== Current members ===
- Andy Kyriacou – vocals
- Natalie Kyriacou – backing vocals
- Matt Earnshaw – drums
- Oli Silk – keyboards
- Steve Etherington - keyboards

== Discography ==
=== Albums ===
Year	Album	UK	Certifications
1981	Adventures in Clubland	5	
1983	Trick of the Light	53	
1983	Party Tonight	45	BPI: Gold
1983	Juanita (Japan only)	—	
1985	Burn It!	—	
2002	Back on Track	—	
2002	Moves 2 Fast	—	
2006	Modern Romance: The Platinum Collection	—	
"—" denotes releases that did not chart.

=== Singles ===
Year	Single	Peak chart positions							Certifications
Year	Single	AUS	FIN	IRE	NL	SWE	UK	US Dance	Certifications
1980	"Modern Romance"	—	—	—	—	—	—	—	
1981	"Tonight"	—	—	—	—	—	—	—	
1981	"Everybody Salsa"	—	—	19	—	—	12	—	
1981	"Ay Ay Ay Ay Moosey"	—	27	15	—	—	10	—	
1981	"Can You Move" (US-only release)	—	—	—	—	—	—	2	
1982	"Queen of the Rapping Scene (Nothing Ever Goes the Way You Plan)"	—	—	—	36	—	37	—	
1982	"By the Way... (I'm Still in Love with You)"	—	—	—	—	—	—	—	
1982	"Cherry Pink and Apple Blossom White" (featuring John Du Prez)	—	—	8	—	—	15	—	
1982	"Best Years of Our Lives"	89	—	6	—	11	4	—	BPI: Silver
1982	"Band of Gold" (B-side to "The Man Who Sold the World" by Midge Ure; from the Party Party soundtrack)	—	—	—	—	—	—	—	
1983	"High Life"	—	—	5	—	—	8	—	
1983	"Don't Stop That Crazy Rhythm"	—	—	10	—	—	14	—	
1983	"Walking in the Rain"	—	—	7	—	—	7	—	BPI: Silver
1983	"Juanita" (Japan-only release)	—	—	—	—	—	—	—	
1983	"Good Friday"	—	—	—	—	—	96	—	
1984	"Just My Imagination (Running Away with Me)"	—	—	—	—	—	102	—	
1984	"That's What Friends Are For"	—	—	—	—	—	120	—	
1984	"Move On"	—	—	—	—	—	133	—	
1985	"Burn It!"	—	—	—	—	—	152	—	
1985	"Tarzan Boy"	—	—	—	—	—	—	—	
1985	"Best Mix of Our Lives"	—	—	—	—	—	81	—	
2019	"Rhythm Is My Lover"	—	—	—	—	—	—	—	
"—" denotes releases that did not chart or were not released

==== Related singles ====
- "Tri Tra Trullala" c/w "Best Years of Our Lives" – Joachim Witt/Modern Romance (1982)
- "Everybody Salsa" b/w "Can You Move '88" – David Jaymes (1988)
