= Queen of the Rapping Scene (Nothing Ever Goes the Way You Plan) =

Single by Modern Romance
- Released: 1982
- Recorded: 1982
- Genre: Funk, soul
- Label: Warner Music Group
- Songwriter(s): David Jaymes/Geoffrey Deane
- Producer(s): David Jaymes/Geoffrey Deane/Norman Mighell

Music video
- "Queen Of The Rapping Scene (Nothing Ever Goes The Way You Plan)" on YouTube

"Queen of the Rapping Scene (Nothing Ever Goes the Way You Plan)" is a song by English band Modern Romance.

It features female vocals by Techno Twins vocalist Bev Sage.

It was released as a single in 1982 and reached #37 on the UK Singles Chart, earning them a slot on Top of the Pops.

In the Netherlands it was their only chart hit, making it to number 25 in the top 40.
