= Like Wow! =

Single by Leslie Carter

from the album Shrek: Music from the Original Motion Picture
- B-side: "True"
- Released: January 13, 2001 (US); June 12, 2001 (Australia)
- Recorded: 2000
- Genre: Pop
- Label: DreamWorks
- Songwriters: Jimmy Harry and Sandra St. Victor

International cover

"Like Wow!" is the debut single by American recording artist Leslie Carter. Her debut album of the same name was shelved, making the single her only official release.

The song was officially released on January 13, 2001, and appears on the Shrek: Music from the Original Motion Picture Soundtrack. It is also played in the film's end credits. The song was later featured in the GameCube game Donkey Konga.

== Track listing ==
US Promo CD

1. "Like Wow!" (Radio Edit)

US CD single

1. "Like Wow!" (Radio Edit)
2. "True"

Australia CD single

1. "Like Wow!"
2. "Shy Guy"
3. "Too Much Too Soon"
4. "I Wanna Be Your Girl"

== Release history ==
Country	Date	Format
United States	January 13, 2001	
Australia	June 12, 2001	CD single

== Music video ==
The music video was rarely seen, although it was shown on both the Disney Channel and Nickelodeon, and was not featured on any release. It shows Carter and her boyfriend throughout the video, in an animated scene with bright colors. It was directed by Gregory Dark.

In November 2006, according to Stylus, Carter never wanted to record her first album, but was pressured by her mother. Stylus reports that the video cost $350,000 to make.

== Chart performance ==
Chart (2001)	Peak position
Canada (Nielsen SoundScan)	39
US Billboard Hot 100	99

=== Year-end charts ===
Chart (2001)	Position
Canada (Nielsen SoundScan)	164
