= Ay Ay Ay Ay Moosey =

Single by Modern Romance

from the album Adventures in Clubland
- Released: 1981
- Genre: Salsa, pop
- Label: WEA
- Songwriters: Deane, D. Jaymes
- Producers: Geoff Deane, David Jaymes, Norman Mighell

Modern Romance singles chronology
"Everybody Salsa" (1981)	"Ay Ay Ay Ay Moosey" (1981)	"Queen of the Rapping Scene (Nothing Ever Goes the Way You Plan)" (1981)

"Ay Ay Ay Ay Moosey" is a single by UK band Modern Romance. It was their second UK chart entry in 1981, reaching No. 10. It was released as a 7-inch single and 12-inch single by WEA. It was also released in Germany, Japan and the Netherlands and was produced by David Jaymes Geoff Deane, and Norman Mighell.

== Formats ==
7-inch single

- Ay Ay Ay Ay Moosey
- Tear the Roof Off the Moose

12-inch single

- Ay Ay Ay Ay Moosey
- Moose on the Loose [Disco Mix]
- Tear the Roof Off the Moose [Dub Discomix]

7-inch single (Germany)

- Ay Ay Ay Ay Moosey
- Moose on the Loose

12-inch single (Germany)

- Ay Ay Ay Ay Moosey
- Everybody Salsa

7-inch single (Japan)

- Ay Ay Ay Ay Moosey
- Everybody Salsa

7-inch single (Netherlands)

- Ay Ay Ay Ay Moosey
- Moose on the Loose

== History ==
"Ay Ay Ay Ay Moosey" was originally a UK hit for Modern Romance in 1981 and was included on their debut album, Adventures in Clubland (1981) as part of the Clubland Mix along with "Everybody Salsa", "Salsa Rappsody", and "Moose on the Loose". It was the single that introduced Modern Romance's new drummer, Andy Kyriacou. The single also made its way onto the compilation albums Party Tonight (1983) and Modern Romance: The Platinum Collection (2006). It was also a part of their farewell single, "Best Mix of Our Lives" (1985), an anthology single of the band's biggest hits. The lyrics were written by Deane in order to settle a £10 bet with a Turkish taxi driver, named Moosey, that he couldn't write a hit record with his name in the title,

In 2005 the track was rerecorded with new lyrics as 'I I I Love Barnet' to celebrate Barnet FC's promotion to the Football League.

== Chart position ==
- UK Chart No. 10

== Personnel ==
- Geoff Deane – vocals
- David Jaymes – bass guitar
- Robbie Jaymes – synthesizer
- Paul Gendler – guitar
- Andy Kyriacou – drums
- David Jaymes, Geoff Deane, Norman Mighell – producers
