= Burn It! =

Studio album by Modern Romance
- Released: 1985
- Length: 38:47
- Label: RCA
- Producer: Tony Visconti, Bryan Evans, Modern Romance

Modern Romance chronology
Trick of the Light (1983)	Burn It! (1985)	Back on Track (2002)

Singles from Burn It!
- 1. "Burn It!" Released: 1984; 2. "Move On" Released: 1984; 3. "Thats What Friends Are For" Released: 1984

Burn It! is the third studio album by English band Modern Romance. It was released in 1985 on LP and Cassette tape by RCA and has not since been reissued. Although the record sleeve states the LP was released in 1985, the label on the actual LP is dated 1984. Furthermore, the label states the LP title as Move On.

== Track listing ==
1. "Burn It!" (David Jaymes, Michael John Mullins, Luís Jardim, Andy Kyriacou) - 6:42
2. "That's What Friends Are For" (David Jaymes, Michael John Mullins) - 3:35
3. "Keep a Candle Burning" (David Jaymes, Michael John Mullins, Alexander James Legg) - 3:34
4. "That's Entertainment" (David Jaymes, Michael John Mullins) - 4:07
5. "I'll Always Remember You" (David Jaymes, Michael John Mullins) - 3:48
6. "Move On" (David Jaymes, Michael John Mullins, Tony Visconti) - 3:36
7. "Wasting Away" (Robbie Jaymes, Michael John Mullins, David Jaymes) - 3:41
8. "(Blame My) Jealousy" (Andy Kyriacou) - 3:51
9. "Take Another Look" (David Jaymes, Michael John Mullins, Luís Jardim) - 5:00
10. "Burn It! (Reprise)" (David Jaymes, Michael John Mullins, Luís Jardim, Andy Kyriacou) - 0:53

An expanded digital edition containing alternate mixes and B-sides was released in 2011.

== Personnel ==
Modern Romance

- Michael J. Mullins - vocals
- Paul Gendler - guitar
- David Jaymes - bass guitar
- Robbie Jaymes - synthesizer
- Andy Kyriacou - drums
- Luís Jardim - percussion [Credited on Sleeve]

Technical

- Bryan Evans - engineer
- Steve Rapport - photography

== Singles ==
- "Move On" (1984)
- "That's What Friends Are For" (1984)
- "Burn It! (1985)
