= Walking in the Rain (Modern Romance song) =

Single by Modern Romance

from the album Trick of the Light
- Released: 1983
- Genre: Pop music
- Label: WEA
- Songwriter(s): D. Jaymes, Michael John Mullins
- Producer(s): Tony Visconti

Modern Romance singles chronology
"Don't Stop That Crazy Rhythm" (1983)	"Walking in the Rain" (1983)	"Good Friday" (1983)

"Walking in the Rain" is a Top 10 single and an uncharacteristic ballad from UK salsa music band Modern Romance. It was released in 1983 as a 7-inch single and 12-inch single by WEA. A Japanese version was also released.

== Formats ==
=== 7-inch single ===
- Walking in the Rain
- Walking in the Rain (Blues)

=== 12-inch single ===
- Walking in the Rain
- Walking in the Rain (Blues)

== Chart position ==
- UK Singles Chart #7

== History ==
"Walking in the Rain" was a Top 10 single for Modern Romance and was their last Top 40 hit, released in 1983, during the David Jaymes / Michael J. Mullins era. It reached No. 7 on the UK chart – No. 1 in Thailand – and can be found on Modern Romance's two hit albums, Trick of the Light (1983) and Party Tonight (1983), and on the 2006 CD compilation album, Modern Romance: The Platinum Collection (2006). Walking in the Rain was written by David Jaymes [Modern Romance Bassist and founder member David Jaymes, and lead vocalist, Michael J. Mullins. It can also be found on the Japanese compilation, Juanita (1983).

== Genre ==
"Walking in the Rain" is a soulful – and bluesy – wistful ballad in-keeping with the band's change from the traditional Salsa music style, something they were trying to shake. The song features the distinctive trumpet-driven sounds of John Du Prez.

== Personnel ==
- Michael J. Mullins – vocals
- David Jaymes – bass guitar
- Robbie Jaymes – synthesizer
- Paul Gendler – guitar
- John Du Prez – trumpet
- Andy Kyriacou – drums
- Tony Visconti – producer (music)
