= The Celtic Tenors =

Musical group

- Origin: Dublin, Ireland
- Genres: Classical crossover, opera, Irish traditional, pop
- Years active: 1999–present
- Labels: EMI Classics, Dara Records, Universal Music, Telarc
- Members: Matthew Gilsenan (1999–present); James Nelson (1999–present); Daryl Simpson (2006–present)
- Past members: Niall Morris (1999–2006)
- Website: Official website

The Celtic Tenors is an Irish trio of tenor singers. The trio comprises Matthew “Gilly” Gilsenan, James Nelson, and Daryl Simpson. Known for their signature harmony-rich style, they blend opera, classical, Irish traditional, and pop influences. The group was formed in 1999 by Matthew Gilsenan, James Nelson, and Niall Morris. Niall left the group in 2006 and was replaced by Daryl Simpson.

Initially signed to EMI Classics in 1999, they released their debut album, The Celtic Tenors, in 2000, which topped the classical music charts in the UK. Over the years, they have released three albums with EMI Classics.

== Discography ==
The Celtic Tenors have released several successful recordings:

- The Celtic Tenors (2000) – No. 1 in Ireland and No. 2 in the UK.
- So Strong (2002) – Winner of the Echo Award in Germany.
- The Irish Album (2003), featuring The Dubliners.
- We Are Not Islands (2005).
- Remember Me (2006).
- Hard Times (2008).
- Feels Like Home (2011).
- Christmas (2013).
- Timeless (2015).
- An Irish Songbook (2019).

== Origins and precursor group ==
The Celtic Tenors trace their roots back to The Three Irish Tenors, a precursor group that featured James Nelson, Niall Morris, and Paul Hennessey. This earlier ensemble made its debut on RTÉ’s Theatre Nights program in October 1995. However, The Celtic Tenors, as a reimagined trio, officially launched in 1999 and established their distinct identity.

== Symbolism and harmony ==
Representing three of Ireland's four provinces—Matthew Gilsenan (Leinster), Daryl Simpson (Ulster), and James Nelson (Connacht)—the group emphasizes unity and harmony. Their collaboration symbolizes overcoming historical divisions in Ireland, particularly the North-South divide, with their performances often including harmony-rich a cappella arrangements.

=== Notable performances ===
The Celtic Tenors have performed for several distinguished figures, including:

- President Bill Clinton at Dublin Castle.
- A private performance for Kofi Annan and his wife Nane's birthday at Farmleigh in Dublin.
