= Best Mix of Our Lives =

Single by Modern Romance
- Released: 1985
- Genre: Pop
- Label: WEA
- Producer(s): Les Adams

Modern Romance singles chronology
"Tarzan Boy" (1985)	"Best Mix of Our Lives" (1985)	"Rhythm Is My Lover" (2019)

"Best Mix of Our Lives" is a song by English band Modern Romance. It was released in 1985 as a 7-inch and 12-inch single by WEA. The track is a mix of their biggest hits, and was the last single before the band split. It reached No. 81 on the UK Singles Chart.

== Track listings ==
7-inch single

- "Best Mix of Our Lives" ("Everybody Salsa" / "Ay Ay Ay Ay Moosey" / "High Life" / "Don't Stop That Crazy Rhythm" / "Best Years of Our Lives")
- "Best Years of Our Lives" [re-mix]

12-inch single

- "Best Mix of Our Lives" ("Everybody Salsa" / "Ay Ay Ay Ay Moosey" / "High Life" / "Don't Stop That Crazy Rhythm" / "Best Years of Our Lives" / "Salsa Rappsody" / "Moose on the Loose")
- "Best Years of Our Lives" [extended re-mix]

== Content ==
"Best Mix of Our Lives" and "Tarzan Boy" were the band's last-ditch attempts to revive their flagging career. "Best Mix of Our Lives" is a farewell anthology of sorts, a mix of their five biggest hits: "Everybody Salsa", "Ay Ay Ay Ay Moosey", "High Life", "Don't Stop That Crazy Rhythm" and "Best Years of Our Lives". The 12-inch version featured the B-side to "Everybody Salsa" ("Salsa Rappsody") and the B-side to "Ay Ay Ay Ay Moosey" ("Moose on the Loose").

"Don't Stop That Crazy Rhythm" is a pop song with elements of Afro-Cuban and mambo. "Everybody Salsa" and "Ay Ay Ay Ay Moosey" are Latin American salsa tunes. "Best Year of Our Lives" and "High Life" are pop songs with elements of salsa and R&B.

== Personnel ==
- Michael J. Mullins – vocals on "Best Years of Our Lives", "High Life", "Don't Stop That Crazy Rhythm"
- Geoff Deane – vocals on "Everybody Salsa", "Ay Ay Ay Ay Moosey", "Salsa Rappsody", "Moose on the Loose"
- David Jaymes – bass guitar and backing vocals
- Robbie Jaymes – synthesizer
- Paul Gendler – guitar
- John Du Prez – trumpet
- Andy Kyriacou – drums
