= Cherry Pink (and Apple Blossom White) =

Song composed by Louis Guglielmi

"Cerisiers Roses et Pommiers Blancs"

Song
- Language: French, English
- English title: "Cherry Pink and Apple Blossom White"
- Written: 1950
- Composer: Louiguy
- Lyricists: Jacques Larue (French), Mack David (English)

"Cherry Pink and Apple Blossom White" or "Cerezo Rosa" or "Ciliegi Rosa" or "Gummy Mambo", is the English version of "Cerisiers Roses et Pommiers Blancs", a popular song with music by Louiguy written in 1950. French lyrics by Jacques Larue and English lyrics by Mack David both exist, and recordings of both have been quite popular.

== Pérez Prado version ==
"Cherry Pink and Apple Blossom White"

Single by Pérez Prado
- B-side: "Rhythm Sticks"
- Released: December 1954
- Recorded: August 23, 1954
- Genre: Latin; mambo; cha-cha-cha
- Length: 2:59
- Label: RCA Victor
- Composer: Louiguy
- Lyricists: Jacques Larue, Mack David

Pérez Prado singles chronology
"Marilyn Monroe Mambo" (1954)	"Cherry Pink and Apple Blossom White" (1954)	"Maria Elena" (1955)

Audio sample
- file; help

Pérez Prado's recording of the song as an instrumental with his orchestra featuring trumpeter Billy Regis, whose trumpet slides down and up before the melody would resume, was the most popular version. It was first recorded and released in Mexico in 1953 under the full title "Cerezo Rosa (Cherry Pink And Apple Blossom White)", becoming one of the biggest hits of that year in Mexico. It was then released in the United States in 1954, becoming a hit there in 1955, reaching number one for 10 weeks on the Billboard chart. It became a gold record, and it was featured on the movie Underwater! (1955), where Jane Russell can be seen dancing to the song. Prado recorded "Cherry Pink" several times, the best known version being the original hit recording from 1953 and the 1960 recording in stereo.

Billboard ranked the former version as the number one song of 1955. The most popular vocal version in the U.S. was by Alan Dale, which was number fourteen on the chart in 1955.

== Other significant versions ==
In the United Kingdom, two versions went to number one in 1955. The first was the rendition by Prado, which reached number one for two weeks. Less than a month later, the take by the British trumpeter Eddie Calvert reached number one for four weeks.

Al Hirt included it on his 1965 album, They're Playing Our Song.

In 1982, the British pop group Modern Romance (featuring John Du Prez) had a UK Top 20 hit with a vocal of the song.

== See also ==
- List of UK Singles Chart number ones of the 1950s
- List of top-ten songs for the 1950s in Mexico#1953
