= Adventures in Clubland =

Studio album by Modern Romance
- Released: 1981
- Recorded: Basing Street Studios in London, England
- Length: 43:48
- Label: WEA
- Producer: Norman Mighell, Geoff Deane, David Jaymes

Modern Romance chronology
Adventures in Clubland (1981)	Trick of the Light (1983)

Singles from Adventures in Clubland
- 1. "Everybody Salsa" Released: August 1981; 2. "Ay Ay Ay Ay Moosey" Released: November 1981; 3. "Queen of the Rapping Scene (Nothing Ever Goes the Way You Plan)" Released: January 1982

Professional ratings
Review scores
Source	Rating
AllMusic	3.5/5 stars

Adventures in Clubland is the debut album by English band Modern Romance. It was released in 1981 on LP and cassette tape by WEA, and in 2008 a CD reissue was released by Wounded Bird Records. In Canada, it was released under the name Geoffrey Deane and David Jaymes

== Track listing ==
All tracks written by Geoff Deane and David Jaymes, except where stated.

1. "Bring on the Funkateers" – 4:09 (Geoff Deane, David Jaymes, Paul Gendler)
2. "Nothing Ever Goes the Way You Plan/Queen of the Rapping Scene" – 5:47
3. Clubland Mix – 11:36 (Geoff Deane, David Jaymes, Paul Gendler)
  - "Everybody Salsa" (Geoff Deane, David Jaymes)
  - "Moose on the Loose"
  - "Salsa Rapp-Sody"
  - "Ay Ay Ay Ay Moosey" (Geoff Deane, David Jaymes)
4. "We've Got Them Running (The Counting Song)" – 3:41
5. "Can You Move" – 8:28
6. "I Can't Get Enough" – 4:20
7. "Stand Up" – 5:52

== Chart position ==
- Venezuela - #1 [certified gold]

== Personnel ==
- Geoff Deane – vocals
- Paul Gendler – guitar
- David Jaymes – bass guitar
- Robbie Jaymes – synthesizer
- Andy Kyriacou – drums
- John Du Prez – trumpet
- Michael J. Mullins – backing vocalist, guitar [Credited on Sleeve]

== Singles ==
- Everybody Salsa (1981) UK #12
- Ay Ay Ay Ay Moosey (1981) UK #10
- Queen of the Rapping Scene / Nothing Ever Goes the Way You Plan (1982) UK #37
