= John Du Prez =

British composer (born 1946)

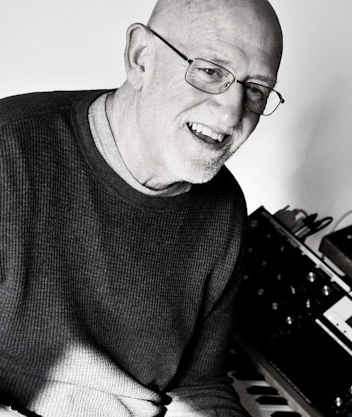

Background information
- Born: 14 December 1946 (age 79); Sheffield, England
- Genres: Film; Classical; Music theatre
- Occupations: Composer; Musician; Conductor
- Instruments: French Horn; Trumpet; Keyboards
- Formerly of: Modern Romance
- Awards: 48th Grammy Award for Best Musical Cast Album; 59th Tony Award's – Best Musical with Tony Nomination for the score
- Website: www.johnduprez.com

John Du Prez (born Trevor Jones, 14 December 1946) is a Grammy Award-winning British musician, conductor and composer who has scored over 20 feature films including A Fish Called Wanda, Teenage Mutant Ninja Turtles I-III, and the cult classic UHF.

A Trevelyan Scholar at Christ Church, Oxford (Oriental Studies) 1966-70, he spent a year abroad on Chinese language study leave and became Principal Horn of the Hong Kong Philharmonic Orchestra. From 1976 he worked as a Music Lecturer at London University until 1979, when he entered the film industry composing additional music for Monty Python's Life of Brian. Working frequently with the Pythons and scoring movies for George Harrion's Handmade Films, he also played trumpet on many UK Top 40 hits with the UK Salsa band Modern Romance. The international success of A Fish Called Wanda took him to America, where he scored Weird Al' Yankovic's UHF and the first three Teenage Mutant Ninja Turtles. The original Teenage Mutant Ninja Turtles soundtrack album went platinum.

In October 2026, John is scheduled to conduct UHF Live-to-Screen at the Greek Theatre in Los Angeles, including a new specially composed Overture.

In 2001 he co-wrote Monty Python's Spamalot with Eric Idle, which won 2005 Tony Award for Best Musical and is currently enjoying a major US tour. His score for Spamalot was also Tony nominated. In 2011 he conducted Not the Messiah with the BBC Symphony Orchestra at Royal Albert Hall for Monty Python's 40th Anniversary and was Music Director for Python's 2014 O2 Arena concerts. He recently scored the BAFTA Award-winning TV animation series The Clangers and now lives on the south coast of England. At age 79 he is still very active and has 3 new stage musicals, 2 feature films, and a choral requiem in development.

He is also known for his extensive collaborations with Monty Python, having worked on several films and shows by members of the troupe, including composing, conducting, and arranging for Monty Python’s Life of Brian (1979), Time Bandits (1981), Monty Python Live at the Hollywood Bowl (1982), Monty Python's The Meaning of Life (1983), A Private Function (1984), Personal Services (1987), A Fish Called Wanda, Number 27 (both 1988), The Wind in the Willows (1996), Spamalot (2004), Not the Messiah (He's a Very Naughty Boy) (2010), and Monty Python Live (Mostly) (2014). For his work on Spamalot, which ran 1,575 performances on Broadway, he was nominated for the Tony Award for Best Original Score.

== Early life and education ==
Du Prez was born in Sheffield, England. He received his MA (Oxon), B.Mus., ARCM, and was a Trevelyan Scholar at Christ Church, Oxford. In 1976 he joined the staff of the University of London's music department before becoming a full-time composer. He would then begin a 30-year working relationship with Eric Idle.

He adopted the name John Du Prez in 1980 to avoid confusion with the South African film composer of the same name Trevor Jones.

== Career ==
Du Prez has often worked with Monty Python, most notably the score for Monty Python's The Meaning of Life as well as with John Cleese on A Fish Called Wanda. He contributed several cues to the Terry Jones film Monty Python's Life of Brian (1979) and on the Terry Gilliam film Time Bandits (1981). He arranged the strings and played all the brass & piano on the Life of Brian title music.

John Du Prez has scored many other films including the Rob Lowe vehicle Oxford Blues (1984), A Private Function (1984), the Jim Carrey comedy Once Bitten (1985), and the Teenage Mutant Ninja Turtles movies. He contributed to the soundtrack of the animated film The Wild (2006).

== Discography ==
=== Albums (with Modern Romance) ===
- Adventures in Clubland (album) (1982) Venezuela #1 [Gold]
- Trick of the Light (1983) UK #53
- Party Tonight (1983) UK #45
- Juanita aka Party Tonight (1983) Japan

=== Singles (with Modern Romance) ===
- "Everybody Salsa" (1981) UK #10
- "Ay Ay Ay Ay Moosey" (1981) UK #12
- "Queen of the Rapping Scene (Nothing Ever Goes the Way You Plan)" (1982) UK #37
- "Cherry Pink and Apple Blossom White" (1982) UK #15
- "Best Years of Our Lives" (1983) UK #4
- "High Life" (1983) UK #8
- "Don't Stop That Crazy Rhythm" (1983) UK #14
- "Walking in the Rain" (1983) UK #7 & Thailand #1
- "Good Friday" (1983) UK #96
- "Best Mix of Our Lives" (1985) UK #81

=== Singles (as solo artist) ===
- "Oh My Papa" (1983)

== Composer (scores) ==
- Nursery Rhymes (1982)
- The Pantomime Dame [documentary] (1982)
- The Meaning of Life (1983)
- The Crimson Permanent Assurance [short] (1983)
- Bullshot (1983)
- Oxford Blues (1984)
- A Private Function (1984)
- She'll Be Wearing Pink Pyjamas (1985)
- Once Bitten (1985)
- Love with the Perfect Stranger [TV Movie] (1986)
- Personal Services (1987)
- Sunday Premiere TV Series, episode "Claws" (1987)
- Number 27 (1988)
- A Fish Called Wanda (1988)
- A Chorus of Disapproval (1989)
- UHF (1989)
- Teenage Mutant Ninja Turtles (1990)
- Screen Two TV Series [3 episodes] (1988-1990)
- Bullseye! (1990)
- Teenage Mutant Ninja Turtles II: The Secret of the Ooze (1991)
- Mystery Date (1991)
- Thatcher: The Final Days (1991)
- Thacker (1992)
- Carry On Columbus (1992)
- Teenage Mutant Ninja Turtles III (1993)
- A Good Man in Africa (1994)
- The Wind in the Willows (1996)
- Captain Star TV Series [4 episodes] (1997)
- Dog and Duck (2000)
- Fascination (2004)
- The Large Family TV Series (2006)
- Not the Messiah (He's a Very Naughty Boy) (2010)
- Clangers (2015–present)

== Writer (soundtracks) ==
- Monty Python: Almost the Truth – The Lawyers Cut TV Series – Fuck Christmas & The Galaxy Song (2009)
- BCN aixeca el telo TV Series – The Song That Goes Like This (2008)
- The Wild – Really Nice Day & Really Nice Day Finale (2006)
- Splitting Heirs – Somebody Stole My Baby (1993)
- Teenage Mutant Ninja Turtles II: The Secret of the Ooze – That's Your Consciousness (1991)
- Shanghai Surprise – Hottest Gong in Town & Zig-Zag (1986)
- The Crimson Permanent Assurance – Short Film – Accountancy Shanty (1983)
- Monty Python's The Meaning of Life – The Meaning of Life, Oh Lord Please Don't Burn Us, Galaxy Song & Accountancy Shanty (1983)
- Time Bandits – Me and My Shadow (arrangement) (1981)
- Monty Python's Life of Brian – Brian Song (1979)

== Conductor ==
- Monty Python Live at the Hollywood Bowl (1982)
- A Private Function (1984)
- A Fish Called Wanda (1988)
- A Good Man in Africa (1994)
- Not the Messiah (He's a Very Naughty Boy) (2010)
- Monty Python Live (Mostly) (2014)

== Music producer ==
- A Good Man in Africa (1994)
- Not the Messiah (He's a Very Naughty Boy) (2010)

== Music arranger ==
- One Foot in the Grave TV Series [41 episodes] + Signature Tune (1990–2000)
- Captain Star TV Series [4 episodes] (1997)

== Actor ==
- Bullshot (1983) as Ginger Johnson
- One Foot in the Grave TV Series, episode The Beast in the Cage (1992) as The voice of (voice)

== Screenwriter ==
- Not the Messiah (He's a Very Naughty Boy) with Eric Idle (2010)

== Self ==
- Not the Messiah (He's a Very Naughty Boy) (as the conductor) (2010)
- Monty Python: Almost the Truth – The Lawyers Cut [3 episodes] TV Series (2009)
- The South Bank Show TV series documentary [1 episode] (2006)
- The 59th Annual Tony Awards TV Special (2005)
- Rod and Emu's Saturday Special [1 episode] with Modern Romance (1983)
- Good Friday with Modern Romance Music Video (1983)
- Walking in the Rain with Modern Romance Music Video (1983)
- Don't Stop That Crazy Rhythm with Modern Romance Music Video (1983)
- High Life with Modern Romance Music Video (1983)
- The Russell Harty Television Show with Modern Romance [unknown episodes] (1983)
- The Krankies Club TV Series [3 episodes] with Modern Romance (1982–83)
- Top of the Pops with Modern Romance [unknown episodes] (1982–83)
- Best Years of Our Lives with Modern Romance Music Video (1982)
- Get It Together TV Series [episodes unknown] (1982)
- The Keith Harris (ventriloquist) Show TV Series [1 episode] with Modern Romance (1982)

== Awards and accolades ==
- 48th Grammy Awards – Grammy Award for Best Musical Show Album – Winner with Eric Idle – Monty Python's Spamalot (2005).
- 59th Tony Award's – Best Original Score (Music and/or Lyrics) Written for the Theatre (John Du Prez and Eric Idle (Music); Eric Idle (Lyrics)) Nominee – Monty Python's Spamalot (2005).
