= List of Christopher Eccleston performances =

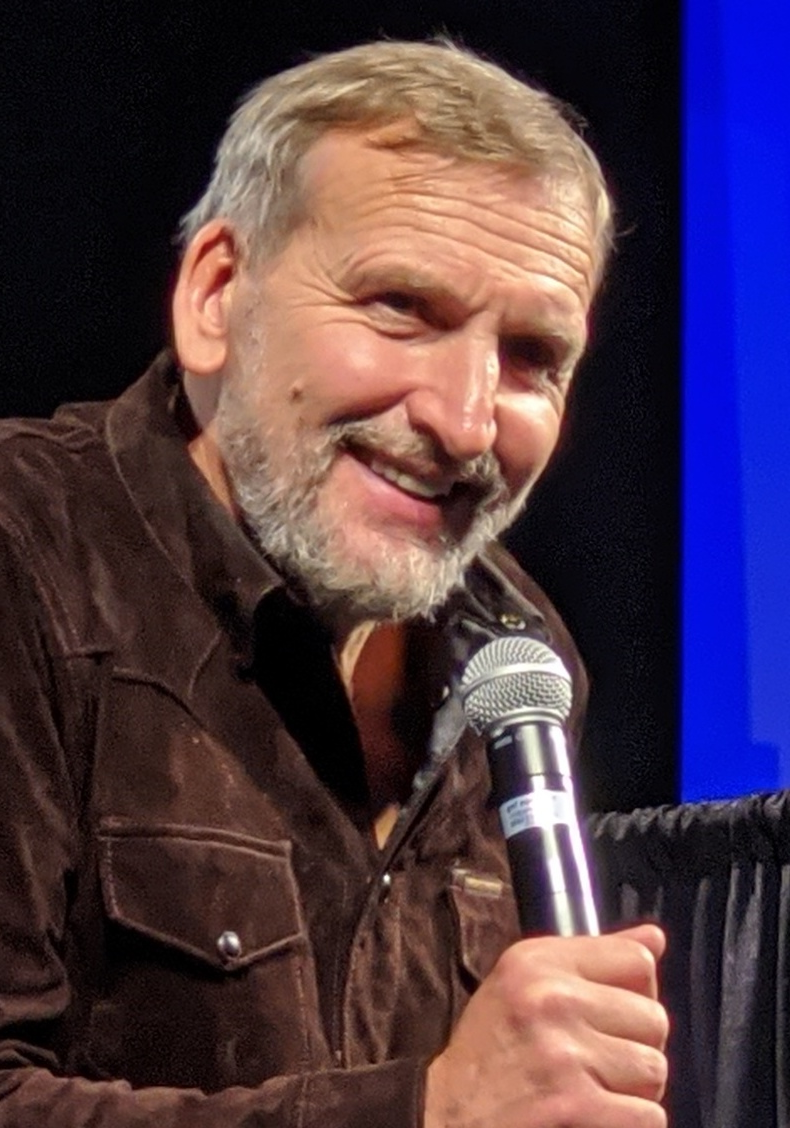
Eccleston at GalaxyCon Louisville in 2019

Christopher Eccleston is an English actor whose work has encompassed Hollywood blockbusters and arthouse films, television dramas, Shakespearean stage performances and science fiction.

Eccleston's professional stage debut was as Pablo Gonzalez in the Bristol Old Vic's April-May 1989 production of A Streetcar Named Desire. His first on-screen role was in the 1990 BBC thriller Blood Rights. Eccleston's film debut, playing Derek Bentley in Let Him Have It (1991), was his breakout role. A regular part as DCI Bilborough in the crime drama Cracker (1993–94) brought him widespread recognition in the UK. Following a role in Danny Boyle's film Shallow Grave (1994), he was nominated for the BAFTA TV Award for Best Actor for playing Nicky Hutchinson in the BBC Two television drama Our Friends in the North (1996). He also starred in Jimmy McGovern's television film Hillsborough (1996).

Eccleston subsequently appeared in a wide variety of British and American films, such as Michael Winterbottom's Jude (1996) and 24 Hour Party People (2002), Boyle's 28 Days Later (2002), Gone in 60 Seconds (2000) and Revengers Tragedy (2002). Eccleston played the lead role in Hamlet at the West Yorkshire Playhouse in 2002. He received a second BAFTA nomination for playing Stephen Baxter, a Mancunian everyman who learns he is the son of God, in the ITV television drama serial The Second Coming (2003).

Eccleston found international popularity with his lead role as the ninth incarnation of the Doctor in the BBC science fiction series Doctor Who (2005). He was nominated for a Broadcasting Press Guild Award and a BAFTA Cymru Award for Best Actor, and was voted Most Popular Actor at the National Television Awards. He left the role after one series, and since 2021 has reprised the role in a series of licensed audio dramas for Big Finish Productions. Eccleston won an International Emmy Award for starring in a 2010 episode of McGovern's anthology drama Accused. He played villainous roles in the action film G.I. Joe: The Rise of Cobra (2009) and the Marvel Cinematic Universe superhero film Thor: The Dark World (2013).

He starred as Matt Jamison on the HBO drama series The Leftovers (2014–2017), earning two consecutive nominations for Best Supporting Actor in a Drama Series at the Critics' Choice Television Awards. He was nominated for an International Emmy Award for Best Actor for his role in the television miniseries Come Home (2018). Eccleston played the title role in the Royal Shakespeare Company's production of Macbeth in 2018. From 2016 to 2020, he played Maurice Scott in the drama series The A Word. Since 2022, he played Fagin in the BBC family comedy drama series Dodger.

== Film ==
Year	Title	Role	Refs.
1991	Let Him Have It	Derek Bentley	
1993	Anchoress	Priest	
1994	Shallow Grave	David Stevens	
1996	Jude	Jude Fawley	
1998	A Price Above Rubies	Sender Horowitz	
1998	Elizabeth	Duke of Norfolk	
1999	Heart	Gary Ellis	
1999	Existenz	Seminar Leader	
1999	With or Without You	Vincent Boyd	
2000	Gone in 60 Seconds	Raymond Calitri	
2001	The Others	Charles Stewart	
2001	The Invisible Circus	Wolf	
2002	24 Hour Party People	Boethius	
2002	I Am Dina	Leo Zhukovsky	
2002	Revengers Tragedy	Vindici	
2002	28 Days Later	Major Henry West	
2007	The Seeker	The Rider	
2008	New Orleans, Mon Amour	Henry	
2009	G.I. Joe: The Rise of Cobra	James McCullen / Destro	
2009	Amelia	Fred Noonan	
2012	Song for Marion	James Harris	
2013	Thor: The Dark World	Malekith	
2015	Legend	Leonard "Nipper" Read	
2018	Dead in a Week or Your Money Back	Harvey	
2018	Where Hands Touch	Heinz	
2024	Young Woman and the Sea	Jabez Wolffe	
TBA	Chasing Millions †	Crayford	

Key
†	Denotes films that have not yet been released

=== Documentary films ===
Year	Title	Role	Refs.
2002	The Importance of Being Morrissey	Narrator	
2003	Cromwell – Warts and All	Narrator	
2005	Working Class Movement Library	Narrator	
2016	1599: A True Story of the Elizabethan Court	Narrator	

== Television ==
Year	Title	Role	Notes	Refs.
1990	Blood Rights	Dick	Television serial	
1990	Casualty	Stephen Hills	Episode: " A Reasonable Man"	
1991	Inspector Morse	Terrence Mitchell	Episode: "Second Time Around"	
1991	Chancer	Radio	Episode: "Jo"	
1991	Boon	Mark	Episode: "Cover Up"	
1992	Rachel's Dream	Man in Dream	Channel 4's Video Fantasies series	
1992	Poirot	Frank Carter	Episode: "One, Two, Buckle My Shoe"	
1992	Friday on my Mind	Sean Maddox	3 episodes	
1992	Business with Friends	Angel Morris	Television film	
1992	Performance	Frankie Bryant	Episode: "Roots"	
1993–1994	Cracker	DCI David Bilborough	10 episodes	
1995	Hearts and Minds	Drew Mackenzie	4 episodes	
1996	Our Friends in the North	Nicky Hutchinson	9 episodes	
1996	Hillsborough	Trevor Hicks	Television film	
2000	Wilderness Men	Alexander von Humboldt		
2000	Clocking Off	Jim Calvert	2 episodes	
2001	Strumpet	Strayman	Television film	
2001	Linda Green	Tom Sherry / Neil Sherry	Episode: "Twins"	
2001	Othello	Ben Jago	Television film	
2002	The League of Gentlemen	Dougal Siepp	Episode: "How the Elephant Got Its Trunk"	
2002	Flesh and Blood	Joe Broughton	Television film	
2002	The King and Us	Anthony	Waiting for the Whistle series	
2002	Sunday	General Ford	Television film	
2003	The Second Coming	Stephen Baxter	2 episodes	
2005	Doctor Who	Ninth Doctor	Series 1; 13 episodes	
2005	Blue Peter	Ninth Doctor	In-character appearance on 4 April	
2005	Dubai Dreams	Narrator	Documentary series	
2005	Einstein's Big Idea	Narrator	Television docudrama film	
2005	Wanted: New Mum and Dad	Narrator	Television documentary film	
2005	Born to Be Different	Narrator	Documentary series	
2005–2006	The Dark Side of Porn	Narrator	Episode: "Porn Shutdown"; Documentary series	
2006	Perfect Parents	Stuart	Television film	
2006	The 1970s: That Was The Decade That Was	Narrator		
2007	Heroes	Claude Rains	5 episodes	
2008	The Sarah Silverman Program	Dr. Lazer Rage	Episode: "I Thought My Dad Was Dead, But It Turns Out He's Not"	
2009	Wounded	Narrator	Documentary series; 2 episodes	
2010	Lennon Naked	John Lennon	Television film	
2010	Accused	Willy Houlihan	Episode: "Willy's Story"	
2011	The Shadow Line	Joseph Bede	All 7 episodes	
2011	The Borrowers	Pod Clock	Television film	
2011	The Bomb Squad	Narrator	Documentary series; 2 episodes	
2012	Blackout	Daniel Demoys	3 episodes	
2012	Timeshift	Narrator	Documentary series; Episode: "When Wrestling was Golden: Grapples, Grunts and Grannies"	
2013	Lucan	John Aspinall	2 episodes	
2014–2017	The Leftovers	Matt Jamison	Main role	
2015	Fortitude	Charlie Stoddart		
2015	Safe House	Robert	Season 1; Main role	
2015	Brian Pern Indie Special	Luke Dunmore		
2016	Brian Pern: 45 Years of Prog and Roll	Luke Dunmore		
2016	The Last Miners	Narrator	Documentary series; 2 episodes	
2016–2020	The A Word	Maurice Scott	Main role	
2017	Brian Pern: A Tribute	Luke Dunmore	Television film	
2017	Manchester: 100 Days After the Attack	Narrator	Television documentary film	
2017–present	Ambulance	Narrator	Since season 2	
2018	Come Home	Greg	All 3 episodes	
2018	King Lear	Oswald	Television film	
2018	Danger Mouse	J. Woolington Sham	Voice role; Episode: "No More Mr Ice Guy"	
2018	The Flu That Killed 50 Million	Narrator	Television docudrama film	
2020	2019: A Year in the Life of a Year	Various roles	Television film	
2020	The Kemps: All True	John McVicar	Television film	
2021	Close to Me	Rob Harding	All 6 episodes	
2022	My Name is Leon	Devlin	Television film	
2022–2023	Dodger	Fagin	Main role	
2023	The Kemps: All Gold	Luke Dunmore	Television film	
2023	The Read	Narrator	Episode: "A Kestrel for a Knave"	
2024	True Detective	Captain Ted Connelly	Season 4	
2024	The Guilty Innocent	Presenter	2 episodes	
2026	Unchosen	Mr Phillips	Main Cast	

Key
†	Denotes films that have not yet been released

== Stage ==
Year	Title	Role	Venue	Notes	Refs.
1989	A Streetcar Named Desire	Pablo Gonzalez	Bristol Old Vic		
1989	Doña Rosita the Spinster		Bristol Old Vic		
1989	The Nephew		Bristol Old Vic		
1990	Frank		Soho Poly Theatre/Royal National Theatre		
1990	Abingdon Square		Soho Poly Theatre/Royal National Theatre		
1990	Bent	Lieutenant; Kapo	Royal National Theatre		
1990	Aide-Memoire		Royal Court Theatre		
1993	Waiting at the Water's Edge	Will Couth	Bush Theatre		
2000	Miss Julie	Jean	Theatre Royal, Windsor		
2000	Miss Julie	Jean	Haymarket Theatre		
2002	Hamlet	Hamlet	West Yorkshire Playhouse		
2004	Electricity	Jakey	West Yorkshire Playhouse		
2005	Night Sky		The Old Vic	One-night play; 30 October	
2009	A Doll's House	Neil Kelman	Donmar Warehouse		
2012	Antigone	Creon	Royal National Theatre		
2018	Macbeth	Macbeth	Royal Shakespeare Theatre		
2018	Macbeth	Macbeth	Barbican Theatre, London		
2023	NASSIM		Traverse Theatre	Single performance; 22 August	
2023–2024	A Christmas Carol	Ebenezer Scrooge	The Old Vic		
2026	The Name Of That Song		Live Theatre Company	Monologue, 20/21 June	
2026	A Public Reading of an Unproduced Screenplay About the Death of Walt Disney	Walt Disney	Live Theatre Company	Single performance; 13 November	

=== Performances with unknown dates ===
- Woyzeck – Birmingham Repertory Theatre
- The Wonder – Gate Theatre
- Encounters – National Theatre Studio

=== Filmed plays ===
Year	Title	Role	Refs.
2012	National Theatre Live: Antigone	Creon	
2018	Royal Shakespeare Company: Macbeth	Macbeth	

== Short films ==
Year	Artist	Role	Notes	Refs.
1992	Death and the Compass	Alonso Zunz		
2000	The Tyre	Salesman		
2001	This Little Piggy	Cabbie		
2010	The Happiness Salesman	Salesman		
2013	Emily	James		
2020	Endless			
2024	An Angel on Oxford Street	Saul	Voice role	
2025	Whispers of Freedom	Herbert Köfer	Voice role	
TBA	Ashes Again! †	Dad		

Key
†	Denotes films that have not yet been released

== Music videos ==
Year	Artist	Title	Refs.
2004	I Am Kloot	"Proof"	
2010	I Am Kloot	"Northern Skies"	

== Audio ==
Year	Title	Role	Publisher	Notes	Refs.
1998	Room of Leaves	Frank	BBC Radio 4		
1998	Pig Paradise	Jack Plum	BBC Radio 4		
2001	Some Fantastic Place	Presenter	BBC Radio 2	Tribute to Chris Difford and Glenn Tilbrook	
2001	Bayeux Tapestry	Harold	BBC Radio 4		
2002	Iliad	Achilles	BBC Radio 4		
2004	Life Half Spent	Roger	BBC Radio 4		
2005	Sacred Nation	Narrator	BBC Radio 2		
2005	Crossing the Dark Sea	Alec	BBC Radio 4		
2005	A Day in the Death of Joe Egg	Brian	BBC Radio 3		
2006	This Sceptred Isle	Various Characters	BBC Radio 4		
2008	The Devil's Christmas	Presenter	BBC Radio 2	4 episodes	
2013	Nineteen Eighty-Four	Winston Smith	BBC Radio 4	2 episodes	
2019	Cold Bath Street	Narrator	University of Central Lancashire		
2019	I Love the Bones of You: My Father And The Making Of Me	Audiobook Narrator	Simon & Schuster Audio		
2019	The Whisper Man	Audiobook Narrator	Macmillan Audio		
2021–present	Doctor Who: The Ninth Doctor Adventures	Ninth Doctor	Big Finish Productions	Series 1–4; 37 episodes	
2023	Doctor Who: Once and Future	Ninth Doctor	Big Finish Productions	Episode: "Time Lord Immemorial"	
2024	Scuttled	Thomas Ashworth	Museum of London Archaeology		
2024	Breaking the Rules	President Zhivkov	BBC Radio 4		
