= Bellamy's People =

- Bellamy's People title card
- Also known as: Bellamy's People of the United Kingdom of Great Britain and Northern Ireland
- Genre: Sitcom
- Directed by: Charlie Higson; Paul Whitehouse
- Starring: Rhys Thomas; Charlie Higson; Paul Whitehouse; Simon Day; Felix Dexter; Amelia Bullmore; Lucy Montgomery; Adil Ray; Rosie Cavaliero; Robert Popper; Daniel Kaluuya
- Country of origin: United Kingdom
- Original language: English
- No. of series: 1
- No. of episodes: 8

Production
- Producers: Charlie Higson; Paul Whitehouse; Ali Bryer Carron
- Running time: 30 minutes
- Production companies: BBC; Down the Line Productions

Original release
- Network: BBC Two
- Release: 21 January – 11 March 2010

Bellamy's People, also known as Bellamy's People of the United Kingdom of Great Britain and Northern Ireland, is a British comedy show first broadcast on BBC Two as an eight-episode series. The show is a spin-off from the BBC Radio 4 show Down the Line. The show stars Rhys Thomas as the eponymous Gary Bellamy and the supporting cast features Charlie Higson, Paul Whitehouse, Simon Day, Felix Dexter, Amelia Bullmore, Lucy Montgomery, Adil Ray, Daniel Kaluuya, Mark McIntyre and Robert Popper.

== Production ==
Down the Line is a spoof radio chat show broadcast on BBC Radio 4 between 2006 and 2013 which satirises populist radio phone in shows. Following its success, writers Higson and Whitehouse looked to transfer the format to television; however, it was apparent that the phone-in format would not work, so they decided instead to satirise the celebrity travelogue such as David Dimbleby's How We Built Britain and Alan Titchmarsh's British Isles – A Natural History. In the television programme, radio talk show host Gary Bellamy travels around Britain in his Triumph Stag 'personality vehicle' meeting the people of Britain and trying to find out what makes them tick. The show's working title was Bellamy's Kingdom.

The show was Higson and Whitehouse's first television appearance together since Swiss Toni in 2004. Whitehouse's characters included 23-stone Graham Downes who rarely left his bed.

On 13 May 2010, the BBC announced that they would not be commissioning a second series of Bellamy's People.

== Reception ==
The first and second episodes gained 1.2 million viewers, a 6% and 5% audience share respectively.

== Spin-offs ==
In April 2010, ahead of the UK General Election, the self-styled community leader Mr Khan (Adil Ray) began broadcasting his own comedy videos commenting on the election, the main political parties, and UK politics in general. Khan was subsequently given his own comedy sitcom, Citizen Khan, which was broadcast first in August 2012.
