= Lucy Montgomery (actress) =

British actress

- Education: Jesus College, Cambridge; Royal Central School of Speech and Drama
- Occupations: Actress; comedian; writer
- Years active: 2000–present
- Spouse: Rhys Thomas
- Children: 2

Lucy Montgomery is a British actress, comedian and writer.

== Career ==
While at Jesus College, Cambridge, Montgomery was a member of the Footlights, its amateur theatrical club. Subsequently, she studied at the Central School of Speech and Drama. Montgomery built her career as one third of Comedy Theatre Company Population 3, along with James Bachman and Barunka O'Shaughnessy, and she appeared as a roving reporter for the comic television programme The Friday Night Project. Other television work has included Bo' Selecta!, The Mighty Boosh, and The IT Crowd.

Montgomery has been heard in several Radio 4 programmes, including the radio phone-in spoof Down the Line, Robin and Wendy's Wet Weekends, The Way We Live Right Now, The Museum of Everything, The Department, Another Case of Milton Jones, The Party Line, Harry Hill's Ghost of a Christmas Present, The Pits, the Torchwood story "Lost Souls" and Lucy Montgomery's Variety Pack. She produced a pilot for her own sketch show pilot for the BBC called The Full Montgomery which went on to run on Radio 4 for two series.

In 2005, Montgomery began writing for and performing in the comedy sketch show Tittybangbang on BBC Three. The sketch comedy series also stars Debbie Chazen and has had three series, from 2005 to late 2007. She was in The Armstrong and Miller Show on BBC One, and Bellamy's People on BBC Two. She has also been on The Law of the Playground and The Wall on BBC Three. She provided the voice of Destiny in Mongrels. Montgomery had various roles in The Life of Rock with Brian Pern and Harry and Paul's Story of the Twos. She was also the voice of Jeanine and other female characters in the Animated Puppetoon children's television series A Town Called Panic.

She voiced for the series Badly Dubbed Porn on Comedy Central.

She has appeared in many stage productions, including leads in record-breaking and critically acclaimed Jerusalem with Mark Rylance at the Royal Court in 2009, the 2011–12 revival of Stephen Sondheim's Company at the Sheffield Crucible and Canvas at the Chichester Festival in 2012.

Montgomery appeared in the musical Viva Forever!, based on the music of the Spice Girls.

== Personal life ==
Montgomery is married to fellow comedian Rhys Thomas. They and their two daughters, born in 2008 and 2010, live in East London.

== Filmography ==
=== Film ===
Year	Title	Role	Notes
2006	Phobias	The Pogonophobe	Short film
2011	The Itch of the Golden Nit	Stressed Alice	Voice roles
2011	Isle of Spagg	Fred / Herring	Voice roles
2012	Phone Home	Astronaut's Wife	Short film
2013	A Christmas Panic!		Short film. Voice role (English version)
2016	Circles	Martine	Short film
2017	Bob the Builder: Mega Machines	Mayor Madison	Voice role
2017	Thomas & Friends: Journey Beyond Sodor	Lexi / Troublesome Trucks	Voice roles (UK/US)
2018	Thomas & Friends: Big World! Big Adventures! The Movie	Carly / Cowgirls	Voice roles (UK/US)
2019	Horrible Histories: The Movie – Rotten Romans	Birte (Third New Recruit)	
2020	Jungle Beat: The Movie	Mama Ostrich / The Eggs	Voice role / Vocal effects

=== Television ===
Year	Title	Role	Notes
1997, 2007–2009	The Armstrong & Miller Show	Various characters	14 episodes
2002	A Town Called Panic	Jeanine / Additional voices	Voice roles (English version)
2004	AD/BC: A Rock Opera	Wise Man	TV film
2005	Badly Dubbed Porn	Various characters	Voice roles
2005	The Robinsons	Amanda	Episode: "#1.1"
2005	Planet Sketch	Various	Voice roles
2005	The Mighty Boosh	Townswoman	Episode: "The Priest and the Beast"
2005	Don't Watch That, Watch This		13 episodes
2005–2007	Tittybangbang	Various characters	21 episodes, also writer
2006–2007	Strutter	Elkie Zpittvar	10 episodes
2008	10 Days to War	Natalie Fay	Episode: "A Simple Private Matter"
2008	Headcases	Amy Winehouse / Various	Voice roles, 2 episodes
2008	The IT Crowd	April	Episode: "The Speech"
2008	The Wall	Charles Irons / Various	
2008	The Way We Live Right Now	Georgina Longstaff	
2009	Winging It	Narrator	
2010	Bellamy's People	Various roles	8 episodes
2010	The Stephen K. Amos Show	Candi Karmel	Episode: "#1.1"
2010	Mid Morning Matters with Alan Partridge	Anthea Turner	Voice role, 2 episodes
2010–2011	Mongrels	Destiny	Voice role, 17 episodes
2011	Quiff and Boot	Quiff / Grock	TV film
2011	Absolutely Fabulous	Baron	Episode: "Identity"
2012	The Increasingly Poor Decisions of Todd Margaret	Lesley	1 episode
2012	The Approximate History of Maths	Praxis / Various	TV film. Voice roles
2012	Ruddy Hell! It's Harry and Paul	Various characters	Episode: "#4.3"
2012	Full English		2 episodes
2014	Harry & Paul's Story of the 2s	Anne Robinson / Various	TV film
2014	The Fast Show	Various roles	Episode: "The Fast Show Special: Part Two"
2014	Crackanory	Denise	Episode: "The Untangler & Murder He Wrote"
2014–2017	The Life of Rock with Brian Pern	Pepita Sanchez / Xanadu Bramble / Kathy Lette / Lyndsie Symon / Carly Swan	10 episodes
2014–2021	Hey Duggee	Hennie / Chew Chew / Various	Voice roles, 20 episodes
2015	Big Field	Various	
2015–2018	Bob the Builder	Mayor Madison / Jenny Dobbs / Shifter	Voice roles, 69 episodes
2016	The Windsors	Elizabeth I / Samantha	2 episodes
2016	2016: A Life in the Year of a Life	Various	TV film
2016–2018	Tracey Ullman's Show	Krystyna / Various	14 episodes, also writer
2016–2019	Digby Dragon	Grizel / Spellbook	Voice roles, 30 episodes
2017	Brian Pern: A Tribute	Pepita Sanchez	TV film
2017	You're the Worst	Katherine	2 episodes
2017	2017: A Life in the Year of a Life	Various	TV film
2017–2021	Thomas & Friends	Hannah / Carly / Marion / Lexi / The Troublesome Trucks / Cowgirls	Voice roles, 9 episodes (UK/US)
2018	Tracey Breaks the News		2 episodes, also writer
2018	2018: A Life in the Year of a Life	Various	TV film
2018–2023	Disenchantment	Bunty / Becky the Enchantress / Orphan / Fairy	Voice roles, 38 episodes
2019	Worzel Gummidge	Jackie Pudding	Episode: "The Green Man"
2020	2019: A Life in the Year of a Life	Various	TV film
2020	Bumps	Fallon	TV film, also writer
2020	Hapless	Naomi Isaacs	6 episodes
2020	The Kemps: All True	Various characters	TV film
2020–2021	Thomas & Friends Storytime	Carly / Marion / Hannah	Voice roles, 4 episodes
2020–2023	Hilda	Gerda Gustav / Additional voices	Voice roles, 13 episodes
2021	Hilda and the Mountain King	Gerda Gustav / Additional voices	TV film. Voice roles
2022	Big Tree City	Kit	Voice role, 6 episodes
2022–2023	Dodger	Minnie Bilge	14 episodes, also writer and executive producer
2023	Boat Story	Other Janet	Mini-series, 4 episodes
2023	The Kemps: All Gold	PC Gibbs	TV Special
2024	Breathtaking	Clare Boxall	Mini-series, 3 episodes
2025	Wonderblocks	Secret Agent Chicken	4 episodes
2026	Futurama	Bunty	Voice role; Episode: "A New New York Yankee in King Elfo's Court"

=== Video games ===
Year	Title	Role	Notes
2015	Dragon Quest Heroes: The World Tree's Woe and the Blight Below	Additional voices	Voice roles (English versions)
2015	Sword Coast Legends	Andra	Voice roles (English versions)
2016	Dragon Quest Heroes II	Desdemona	Voice roles (English versions)
2019	Arknights	Dobermann	Voice roles (English versions)
2020	Assassin's Creed: Valhalla		Voice roles (English versions)
2021	Bravely Default II	Folie	Voice roles (English versions)
2021	My Friend Peppa Pig	Miss Rabbit / Mummy Mole / Polly Parrot	Voice roles (English versions)
2022	Lego Star Wars: The Skywalker Saga		Voice roles (English versions)
2022	Steelrising	Anne-Josèphe Théroigne de Méricourt / Additional voices	Voice roles (English versions)
2023	Clash: Artifacts of Chaos	Gemini	Voice roles (English versions)
2023	Cyberpunk 2077: Phantom Liberty		Voice roles (English versions)
2023	Forza Motorsport	Female Track Announcer	Voice roles (English versions)
2023	The Talos Principle 2	Pandora	Voice roles (English versions)
2023	Dragon Quest Monsters: The Dark Prince	Ancient Elven Queen / Miriam / The Cane Custodian	Voice roles (English versions)
2026	Star Wars: Galactic Racer	Hibi	Voice roles (English versions)
