= Bumps (TV series) =

British sitcom

- Genre: Sitcom
- Created by: Lucy Montgomery and Rhys Thomas
- Directed by: Sandy Johnson
- Starring: Amanda Redman; Lisa McGrillis; Seb Cardinal; Philip Jackson; Louise Jameson
- Country of origin: United Kingdom
- Original language: English

Production
- Executive producer: Phil Temple
- Producer: Georgie Fallon
- Running time: 29 minutes

Original release
- Network: BBC One
- Release: 21 February 2020

Bumps is a one-off British sitcom created and written by Lucy Montgomery and Rhys Thomas for the BBC, which was broadcast on 21 February 2020. The sitcom follows a sixty-two year old woman who tries, and succeeds, in getting pregnant, and stars Amanda Redman, Lisa McGrillis, Seb Cardinal and Philip Jackson.

== Storyline ==
Set in Frinton-on-Sea, Bumps follows Anita (Amanda Redman), a divorced sixty-two year old mother of two. Despite having an amicable relationship with ex-husband Howard (Philip Jackson), she has a poor relationship with her social-climbing sister Barbara (Louise Jameson) and her lazy children (Lisa McGrillis and Seb Cardinal), she sets upon herself to have a third child after hearing the news of an Indian woman having children in her seventies and finding out her daughter cannot have children. She successfully becomes pregnant, only to find out her daughter has become pregnant as well.

== Cast ==
- Amanda Redman as Anita
- Lisa McGrillis as Joanna
- Seb Cardinal as Aiden
- Philip Jackson as Howard
- Louise Jameson as Barbara
- Lucy Montgomery as Fallon
- Rhys Thomas as Clay
- Freddie Davies as Roy
- Leila Hoffman as Nancy
- Clarke Peters as Charles

== Critical reception ==
Viewers of the sitcom reportedly "begged" the BBC to commission a series after finding it hilarious, according to Entertainment Daily. Michael Hogan of the Daily Telegraph said that it had an "intriguing enough premise" but just became a "nonsensical jumble". Despite saying that Redman's performance was "reliably excellent, whizzing about looking fabulous", he said Louise Jameson and Clarke Peters' characters were "underused".
