= Blunder (TV series) =

- Starring: Nina Conti; Simon Farnaby; Tom Meeten; David Mitchell; Rhys Thomas; Tony Way
- Opening theme: by Steven Burge
- Country of origin: United Kingdom
- No. of episodes: 6

Production
- Executive producer: Alan Marke
- Running time: 22 minutes

Original release
- Network: Channel 4
- Release: 2006

Blunder is a Channel 4 comedy sketch series from 2006 that originally aired on E4. One series of six episodes aired.

== Characters ==
Character		Played by
The Baron	A hyperactive puerile madman who claims to be the most evil man in the world. He notably tires out towards the end, and often finishes attempting to leave the stage in a strange fashion.	Tom
Karate Johnson	A martial arts expert who tells morality tales, ending with his catchphrase "This is karate" and following it up with a flurry of kicks which reveal too much seemingly accidentally at first, but it becomes more deliberate as the series goes on.	Tom
Franco Franco	A Euro-style crooner who sings inappropriate and nonsensical songs about his unfortunate family.	Tom
Colonel Rudd	A maverick wannabe vet who ill-advisedly uses his animal practices on humans.	David
Edgar Ford	A doddery old man, who's "unlikely to make it to Christmas".	David
Nigel Livid	A man who is constantly annoyed by today's poor TV shows. He storms the Channel 4 offices, only to realise he should stop watching them in the first place.	David
Mr. Pratt	The swimming teacher with the barnacle head.	Tony
Tollund Man	A 2,000-year-old peat bog man who has come back to life.	Rhys
Malibu Man	The Malibu man gets randy on Malibu rum and tries it on with a member of the audience. When they refuse his offers he turns to the camera and says "Oh, blow!".	Rhys
Frank	A man who wants to perform a bodily function, such as farting, but refuses to do it in a public place because it's "disrespectful", and says he'll be "back in da minute". He ends up carrying out his function inappropriately, and is frowned upon by a man in a bowler hat and moustache (David Mitchell).	Rhys
Mr Whippy	A domineering father who won't let his son (Rhys) get a word in. The sketch usually ends with Mr Whippy attacking his son.	Tony
Emperor Boswellox	He has conquered moons along with his followers, but his memory isn't quite so superhuman. He asks each member of his group if they would like a particular food item, such as a poppadom or a falafel, before moving on to the audience.	Tony
Trish	A woman who can only talk in a "comedy" language.	Nina
Pru the Bored Housewife	who does unspeakable things with household appliances.	Nina
Stuart Ogilvy	A frustrated middle-aged, middle-class golfer who literally gets steamed up about what's wrong with society. He makes several references about the "gowlf clerb".	Simon
Mighty Mouse	A racehorse who is unlucky in love.	Simon
Singing Cat	Taking place in a car, a singing cat puppet sings (meows) a tune from a TV soap such as Coronation Street, and the owner (Tony) utters obscenities at it. In later episodes, however, the cat would sing a popular tune ("Vienna" by Ultravox), and the owner would join in. This was shown at the credits of each episode.	Tony

== The Baron ==
The Baron was infamous for his use of obscene language. Channel 4 were criticised by Ofcom for allowing this to be aired. Channel 4 said in their defence that a lot of other more offensive bad language had been used in the same time slot. Channel 4 issued a spoof apology at the end of the second episode which was interrupted by a barrage of insults from the Baron.
