= Tittybangbang =

Female-led television sketch comedy show

- Cover of Second Series DVD
- Created by: Bob Mortimer and Jill Parker
- Directed by: Angela De Chastelai Smith (series 1 & 2), Bob Mortimer (series 3)
- Starring: Lucy Montgomery; Debbie Chazen; Tony Way; Shelley Longworth; Lorraine Cheshire; Velile Tshabalala; Di Botcher; Katy Brand; Esther Coles; Steve Oram; Stephen Burge; Rhys Thomas; Linda Regan
- Opening theme: One Horse Town by The Thrills (series 2 & 3)
- Country of origin: United Kingdom
- No. of series: 3
- No. of episodes: 21 (including pilot)

Production
- Executive producers: Bob Mortimer and Lisa Clark
- Camera setup: Multiple-camera
- Running time: 30 mins

Original release
- Network: BBC Three
- Release: 20 September 2005 – 26 December 2007

Tittybangbang is a female-led BBC television sketch comedy show, featuring Lucy Montgomery and Debbie Chazen. It ran between 2005 and 2007 on BBC Three. The show was largely written by Bob Mortimer and Jill Parker and produced by their company Pett Productions.

== History ==
Bob Mortimer and Lisa Clark conceived the idea of Tittybangbang and involved Jill Parker. Mortimer came up with the show's name, wanting "a really memorable title like Desperate Housewives", Clark said in an interview, "it's rude, but in a comedy way".

The pilot aired on BBC Three on 20 September 2005. The first series followed, heavily promoted by an advert in which the cast members danced and mimed to the Pussycat Dolls' hit single "Don't Cha." It ran from 10 January to 14 February 2006, and was a ratings success. After the series finished, BBC Three dedicated an evening to the show, airing each episode in succession.

The second series ran from 13 November to 25 December 2006. It had a new title sequence and theme tune, consisted of seven thirty-minute episodes (including a Christmas special) and matched the first series' success. Both the first and second series were shown on BBC Two in a series of 'Best of' specials.

In March 2007, Tittybangbang was nominated for a Golden Rose international television award. The third and final series followed, with another new title sequence, and ran from 11 November to 16 December 2007, followed by the Christmas special, on 26 December.

Filming for the series took place mostly in and around Kent.

== Critical reception ==
Both critics and the general public formed mixed opinions, and in the press pack for the show's first series, BBC Press Office said that the pilot had "polarised critical response." First impressions of the show were good, with Radio Times describing the show as 'Disturbingly funny,' The Sun calling it 'Laughs galore,' and The Observer describing it as 'Very funny, very horrid.' The show also received negative criticism from certain critics, with The Times describing it as 'Not very funny.'

In an interview with Lucy Montgomery, Digital Spy said that the first series had been labelled "horrid and filthy, but funny," and Montgomery mentioned the necrophiliac pathologists specifically, saying "the necrophilia character, that's gone [from the second series] because public opinion was that that wasn't a good idea."

The BBC Comedy review said "the sketches might not always work, but they're mostly short and to the point," and described it as "one of the best, and certainly the most varied of recent sketch formats," noting that whilst "not as huge as other formats," it had developed a "loyal and addicted following."

== Main characters ==
Below is a selection of some of the main characters in the series.

The Italian Lady is the trademark character of the series.

- The Italian Lady, an exhibitionist who does outlandish things for attention, whilst proclaiming "Don't look at me, I'm shy!". (Montgomery, series 1-3)
- Maxine Bendix, an Eastern-European topless model, and later pop star, who has had a grotesque amount of cheap plastic surgery, which is prone to "just a little bit of seepage". (Montgomery, series 1-3)
- Paula, Ann and Diane, goofy ladettes who play darts; however, Paula, plagued by severe twitching and anxiety, and her jealousy of club compere Tony's romantic interest in Ann, shouts "Right there!" and promptly misses the board. (Chazen, Montgomery, Cheshire and Way, series 1-3). Paula was Chazen's favourite character to perform.
- Don Peacock, a bald, Wearside man whose fantasy is to have a "waz", a "widdle" or "a little pee pee" (urolagnia) on women. (Montgomery, series 1-2)
- Ruth Baxter, an upper class old aged pensioner who likes to fight people, using ridiculously silly methods. (Montgomery, series 1-2)
- Duck and Chip Family, a dysfunctional family whose lives revolve around their love of "quack", or "donald", and chips. (Way, Botcher, Chazen and Montgomery, series 1-3)
- Carol Booth, a stay-at-home mum who, despite protests from her daughter and partner, and competition from neighbour Michelle, resorts to desperate measures to be on television, particularly running from people screaming "(S)he's got a kniiife!" (Chazen, Tshabalala, Way and Montgomery, series 1-3)
- Pete Wade, a spa salesman, and later estate agent, who hardly listens to anyone, interspersing their words with "yeah" and "uh huh", and tries to hit on female customers. (Montgomery, series 1-2)
- Colleen, Nathalie and Melanie, a trio of TV-addicted chavettes who, regardless of their homeland, all speak in thick Jamaican dialects, and get into lengthy, barely comprehensible conversations about the "likkle battams" of famous faces such as Bono or Simon Cowell. (Montgomery, Chazen and Tshabalala, series 1-3)
- Parker and Harris, necrophiliac pathologists who "can't resist a stiffy" and abandon investigatory work to sexually assault the deceased. Susan Parker was loosely based upon Helen Mirren's character in Prime Suspect. (Montgomery and Chazen, series 1)
- Jackie and Nikki, two Geordie friends, but Jackie exploits Nikki's naivete to trick her out of money in return for teaching her how to do completely nonsensical things, such as floating in mid-air. (Chazen and Montgomery, series 2-3)
- Magwash, a revered, wise man who tells tales to the regulars of a storm-blasted coastal pub in the Scottish Highlands, but forever slips, using the wrong (and inappropriate) words, and when interrupted, bellows a thunderclap-punctuated "SILENCE!" (Chazen, series 2)
- The Vampire Slayers, suburban housewives who hunt down people they suspect to be vampires, all the while shouting "Death to vampires!" and "Vampire, vampire, fookin' vampire!". (Montgomery, Chazen and Coles, series 2-3)
- Tom Cruise, whose tour of England and desperation to try out some traditionally English experiences is ruined by his arguing bodyguard's squabbles. (Montgomery, series 2-3)
- Veronica Cooper, an aristocratic, horse-like woman, who finds pleasure in spying on overweight, working class and somewhat dumb men with her equally posh, toothy friend Christina, who is apparently "not supposed to be here!". (Chazen and Montgomery, series 2-3)
- Raul, a camp, androgynous and childish hairdresser who never appears to pick up a pair of scissors, and complains endlessly about his "sore balls". (Montgomery, series 3)
- Irene, who appears in potentially controversial situations, and proceeds to let the subjects know just how much she approves of them ("good for you!"). (Chazen, series 3)
- Idi Amin, the ex-president of Uganda lives on a housing estate, refers to himself as "the king" and spends his time lying in bed watching television, shouting "Emergency, emergency!" to summon his downtrodden wife. (Way and Montgomery, series 3)

== DVD releases ==
Title	Release date	
Title	Region 1	Region 2
Complete first series	–	20 November 2006
Complete second series	–	31 March 2008
Complete third series	–	–
