= A Year in the Life of a Year =

- Genre: Comedy
- Created by: Rhys Thomas
- Written by: Rhys Thomas
- Directed by: Rhys Thomas
- Starring: Rhys Thomas; Lucy Montgomery; Tony Way; Simon Day; Derek Jacobi
- Country of origin: United Kingdom
- Original language: English
- No. of series: 1
- No. of episodes: 4

Production
- Executive producer: Richard Webb/Ben Caudell
- Producer: Rhys Thomas
- Cinematography: Ric Clark
- Editor: Christopher Bird
- Running time: 30 minutes
- Production company: BBC Comedy

Original release
- Network: BBC Four; BBC Four HD; BBC Two HD
- Release: 30 December 2016

A Year in the Life of a Year is a British comedy programme created by and starring Rhys Thomas and co-starring his frequent collaborators, Lucy Montgomery, Tony Way and Simon Day. It is broadcast on BBC Two. The programme is a spoof review of significant national and cultural moments from the year gone by and uses re-edited and dubbed television and film output. Famous parodies included Paddington meets A Very English Scandal.

The programme was first broadcast on 30 December 2016 with the title 2016: A Year in the Life of a Year. A second episode, reviewing 2017, was announced in May 2017. The second show aired on 30 December on BBC Four. A third episode aired on BBC Two on 27 December 2018 and was critically acclaimed. A fourth episode aired on BBC Two on 1 January 2020, reviewing 2019.
