= Swiss Toni =

British TV comedy character, series (2002–2003)

- Starring: Charlie Higson
- No. of series: 2
- No. of episodes: 16

Production
- Production company: Tiger Aspect

Original release
- Network: BBC Three
- Release: 10 February 2003 – 14 September 2004

Swiss Toni is a British television comedy character played by Charlie Higson. He is a 50-something car dealer, usually depicted wearing a double-breasted grey suit with a tie, a tie pin and a pocket square and with his hair styled in a platinum blond bouffant quiff; his accent is reported to be based on Higson's own poor impersonation of Sean Connery.

The character was created by Charlie Higson and Bob Mortimer, and first appeared in 1995 in a sketch in the second series of The Smell of Reeves and Mortimer, attempting to sell a car to the Bra Men. He became best known as a recurring character in another BBC comedy series, The Fast Show, debuting in the show's third series in 1997. He featured in sketches alongside Rhys Thomas as Paul, a junior employee, in which Swiss would typically compare some activity to "making love to a beautiful woman", with the use of comically exaggerated sexual innuendo.

Swiss later reappeared in a sitcom, also titled Swiss Toni, which developed both the character and his situation beyond the confines of the Fast Show sketches. The two series, produced by Tiger Aspect, ran on BBC Three in 2003 and 2004, the first three episodes of the first series also being repeated on BBC One. As well as playing the title character, Higson was the show's main writer and one of its producers. Swiss is again portrayed as the owner of a car dealership, now going through a midlife crisis, including the apparent break-up of his marriage.

Besides Higson as Swiss, other regular cast members included:

- Rhys Thomas as Paul (as in the original Fast Show sketches), a junior salesman at the dealership
- Simon Day (another Fast Show regular) as Geoff Fowler, a salesman who is more successful than Swiss, despite problems with alcoholism (many of whose lines Day improvised)
- Matilda Ziegler as Swiss's wife, Ruth, who breaks up with Swiss and begins a clandestine affair with Geoff
- Emma Rydal as Miranda, the dealership's young receptionist
- Elizabeth Spriggs as Swiss's overbearing and unsympathetic mother

== Sitcom episodes ==
Series 1 (February–March 2003)

1. "Cars Don't Make You Fat", featuring Tom Baker as Derek Asquith, an ageing film director hired to make a commercial for the dealership, Kenny Baker as Guyler and snooker player Steve Davis
2. "Taxed and Tested"
3. "Power Assisted Steering"
4. "Part Exchange"
5. "Left Hand Drive", with Mark Benton as Swiss's rival and bike dealer Crazy Alan
6. "One Previous Owner"

Series 2 (July–September 2004)

1. "Troubleshooter", featuring Olivia Colman as a consultant hired to turn the business around
2. "Speed Date"
3. "Depression"
4. "Gellward"
5. "Cable", featuring Stacey Roca as a cable television producer, and Phill Jupitus
6. "Pangolin"
7. "Mumble Jackets"
8. "Fothergill 2000", featuring Fast Show star Paul Whitehouse as a robot operator, and Mark Heap as a hostage-taker
9. "Listening"
10. "On Top of Old Smokey"
