= The Wall (2008 TV series) =

- Genre: Comedy
- Presented by: Alexa Chung; Rhys Thomas
- Starring: Lee Kern; Lucy Montgomery; We Are Klang; Simon Brodkin; Jamie Glassman
- Country of origin: United Kingdom
- Original language: English
- No. of series: 1
- No. of episodes: 8

Production
- Executive producers: Neil Webster; Peter Holmes; Ruth Phillips
- Producer: Zeppotron

Original release
- Network: BBC Three
- Release: 8 April – 27 May 2008

The Wall is a British comedy television programme presented by Alexa Chung and Rhys Thomas. The programme was produced by Zeppotron for BBC Three and premiered on the channel on 8 April 2008. The programme featured a regular cast of Lee Kern, Lucy Montgomery, We Are Klang, Simon Brodkin and Jamie Glassman who performed comedy sketches, interviews and music and were joined each week by celebrity guests. At the heart of the programme was a large video wall on which viewers could rate sketches and make suggestions. The show was named the "Worst British TV Panel Show/Satire of 2008" in The Comedy.co.uk Awards.
