= Simon Day =

English comedian, actor (born 1962)

- Born: Simon William Day; 7 June 1962 (age 64); Blackheath, London, England
- Occupations: Comedian; actor
- Years active: 1990–present
- Spouse: Ruth
- Children: 2

Simon William Day (born 7 June 1962) is an English comedian and actor known for his roles in the sketch show The Fast Show and the sitcom Grass.

== Career ==
Day was born in Blackheath, London, and rose to fame as a stand-up comic, winning the Time Out new act of the year in 1991 with his music hall character Tommy Cockles. He then appeared on the BBC One show Paramount City as a weekly guest. He continued working live all over England before joining up with Vic Reeves and Bob Mortimer for two tours and two series of Big Night Out. He continued to work with Vic Reeves throughout the 1990s.

In 1993, he was a cast regular in Saturday Zoo, Channel 4's Saturday night extravaganza, in which he appeared as groundbreaking white rapper Ice Pick. His other TV credits include Heartbeat, Jonathan Creek, Sensitive Skin, Love Soup, Driving School, and Skins. His film credits include Shakespeare in Love, as a ferryman on the Thames.

In 2006, he collaborated with ambient house band The Transit Kings on their song "The Last Lighthouse Keeper" which appears on their debut album Living in a Giant Candle Winking at God.

In 2008, Day embarked on his first solo UK stand-up tour, titled 'What a Fool Believes', which saw him play 36 dates during the period 30 October – 15 December, including Dundee, Edinburgh and Glasgow.

In 2009, Day collaborated again with Rhys Thomas and wrote and starred in a web series of six videos as the character Brian Pern for the BBC.

In 2010, Day appeared in the long-running BBC TV series Hustle, playing Luke Baincross, a wannabe playboy with a huge country mansion.

In May 2010, Day played a hospital porter in BBC TV series Holby City on his last day at work following his resignation having won the National Lottery. He had an altercation with a patient's relative and received a bang on the head, and he became increasingly lairy during the episode, at one point making a pass at Connie Beauchamp; some people assumed he was drunk, but it transpired that he had developed a Subdural hematoma as a result of the knock on the head.

Day has appeared as a pundit on the long-running BBC Radio 5 Live Sports Pundit Quiz Fighting Talk on a number of occasions, and is most notable for swearing during a live broadcast during a show in 2009. This was later edited out on the podcast version of the show.

Day appeared in an online-only version of The Fast Show sponsored by Lager brand Fosters on 10 November 2011 along with original cast save for Mark Williams.

In 2012, he published his autobiography, Comedy and Error: They Really Were Marvellous Times.

Day has presented his own series, The Simon Day Show on BBC Radio 4 in May to June 2012.

From 2014 to 2017, he co-wrote and starred in the spoof-documentary series Brian Pern, a BBC Four comedy which parodied the life and career of former Genesis singer Peter Gabriel.

In 2015 Day appeared as Charlie Beckett in the BBC TV series Death in Paradise episode 4.2. In 2019 he appeared as Sid Onslow, a pub landlord, in Pennyworth.

Day starred as Big Gary King, father of Tom Davis' titular character in the BBC One sitcom King Gary, appearing in the 2018 pilot episode and the full series broadcast in 2020.

Day reprised his Fast Show character 'Dave Angel, Eco Warrior' in 2023 in energy usage advertising.

== Personal life ==
Day was addicted to alcohol, drugs and gambling, and spent some time in borstal for theft during his teenage years. He continued to take illegal drugs including cocaine and crack cocaine into the 1990s at the height of his Fast Show fame.

After failing to pass his driving test for charity during the 2003 Comic Relief Programme, Day later went on to gain an automatic driving licence. He is married to Ruth, a former waitress, with whom he has two children, Lloyd and Evie.

== Filmography ==
=== Film ===
Year	Title	Role	Notes
1992	Sid the Sexist	Graham / Various Cockney Characters (voices)	
1998	Shakespeare in Love	First Boatman	
1998	The Fast Show Live	Various roles	Direct-to-video
2002	The Heart of Me	Hospital Doctor	
2007	Run Fatboy Run	Vincent	
2009	The Imaginarium of Doctor Parnassus	Uncle Bob	
2010	Huge	Noel Faulkner	
2012	Jon	Child Therapist	
2016	Ethel & Ernest	Alf (voice)	

=== Television ===
Year	Title	Role	Notes
1991	Vic Reeves Big Night Out	Various roles	5 episodes
1992	The Fat Slags	Baz (voice)	Miniseries
1992	Wilderness Edge	Ian Kaye	2 episodes
1992	A Bunch of Fives	Slow PC	Episode: "The Weekenders"
1992	Saturday Zoo	Bruce Urqhart	Episode #1.2
1992	The Smell of Reeves and Mortimer	Milkman	2 episodes
1994	The All New Alexei Sayle Show	Various characters	Episode #1.4
1994, 2006	The Bill	BJ Berry / Stephen Latham	2 episodes
1994–2014	The Fast Show	Various characters	24 episodes
1995	The Great Kandinsky	News Reporter	Television film
1996	Heartbeat	Fenwick	Episode: "Forget Me Not"
1997	Jonathan Creek	Jordan Strange	Episode: "The House of Monkeys"
1998	In Exile	Denzel	Episode #1.6
1998	Casualty	Cardiothoracic Surgeon	Episode: "New Year and All That"
1998	Ted and Ralph	Tall Tom / Cliff Carter / Friend of Dorothy	Television film
1998	Rex the Runt	Constable Funnyname / Taxi Driver (voices)	3 episodes
1999	You Ain't Seen All These, Right?	Various roles	Television film
2000	Peak Practice	Consultant	Episode: "A Test of Faith"
2000	Randall and Hopkirk (Deceased)	Swift	Episode: "Paranoia"
2001	Happiness	Miserable Dad / Angry Father	2 episodes
2001	Jumpers for Goalposts	Clive Graham	13 episodes
2001	We Know Where You Live	Billy Bleach	Television film
2002	Fun at the Funeral Parlour	Dirty Ernie	Episode: "A Pocket Full of Gravel"
2002	Bertie and Elizabeth	Robert Wood	Television film
2003	Grass	Billy	8 episodes
2003	The Fast Show Farewell Tour	Various roles	Television film
2003–2004	Swiss Toni	Geoff	16 episodes
2004	He Knew He Was Right	Club Member #2	Episode: "Part 1"
2004	Shane	Suicide Man	Episode #1.6
2004	EastEnders	Cabbie	Episode dated 25 December 2004
2005	Casanova	Argenti	Episode #1.1
2005	Space Race	Kammler	Episode: "Race for Rockets"
2005	ShakespeaRe-Told	Quince	Episode: "A Midsummer Night's Dream"
2006	Mr. Loveday's Little Outing	Doctor	Television film
2007	Sensitive Skin	Mike	Episode: "The Wilderness"
2007	Learners	Simon	Television film
2007–2012	Harry & Paul	Various character	12 episodes
2008	Love Soup	Wolf	Episode: "Lobotomy Bay"
2009, 2010	Skins	Leo Mclair	2 episodes
2010	Hustle	Luke Baincross	Episode: "Tiger Troubles"
2010	Bellamy's People	Various characters	10 episodes
2010	Holby City	Frank Chapman	Episode: "Brutally Frank"
2010	Pete & Dud: The Lost Sketches	Performer	Television film
2011	Midsomer Murders	Combover Guy	Episode: "The Oblong Murders"
2011	The Fast Show Faster	Dave Angel / Clive / Colonel Mumas	3 episodes
2011–2012	Pixelface	QM	26 episodes
2012	Comedy Showcase	Rhodesy	Episode: "The Function Room"
2012	New Tricks	Tony Symes	Episode: "Queen and Country"
2012	Mr Blue Sky	Mr. Bolt	3 episodes
2013	It's Kevin	Various / Screaming Pillows Pitchman	3 episodes
2013	Mount Pleasant	Gerry	5 episodes
2014	Moone Boy	Sean Murphington Esq.	Episode: "Handball Duel"
2014	The Incredible Adventures of Professor Branestawm	Colonel Dedshott	Television film
2014–2017	Brian Pern (Various titles)	Brian Pern	11 episodes
2015	Death in Paradise	Charlie Beckett	Episode: "Hidden Secrets"
2015	Drunk History: UK	Lord Carnarvon	Episode: "Tutankhamen/Dick Turpin/Byron's Pet Bear"
2015	Nurse	Tony Beckton	3 episodes
2015	SunTrap	Handlebar	Episode: "The Big Sleep"
2015	Cradle to Grave	Shaky	Episode #1.6
2015	Professor Branestawm Returns	Colonel Dedshott	Television film
2016	Boomers	Vaughan	Episode: "Naming Ceremony"
2016	The Amazing World of Gumball	Narrator	Episode: "The Love"
2016	Lost Sitcoms	Alf Garnett	Episode: "Till Death Us Do Part"
2017	Loaded	Jeff	3 episodes
2017	Zapped	Daggett	Episode: "Pear Fair"
2018	Dave Allen at Peace	Lew Grade	Television film
2018	A Year in the Life of a Year	Various	Episode: "2018"
2018–2020	King Gary	Big Gary King	8 episodes
2019–2020	Pennyworth	Sid Onslow	15 episodes
2020	The Windsors	Mike Middleton	Episode #3.2
2020	The Kemps: All True	Neighbour	Television film
2021	Elliott from Earth	Various voices	5 episodes
