= Transit Kings =

British electronica band

The Transit Kings
- Origin: London, England
- Genres: Electronica
- Years active: 2001–present
- Label: Malicious Damage
- Members: Alex Paterson; Guy Pratt; Dom Beken
- Past members: Jimmy Cauty

The Transit Kings are a British electronica band consisting of Alex Paterson, Guy Pratt, and Dom Beken. Jimmy Cauty, co-founder of the Orb with Paterson, was involved in initial recording sessions but does not take part in live sessions. He is currently on "extended leave". The band was named Custerd for a brief period.

== History ==
Ambient house pioneers Paterson (The Orb) and Cauty (The Orb, The KLF), joined with Pratt and Beken in London's Townhouse Studios in the summer of 2001, to begin work on a new project. Recording later continued in Cauty's Brighton studio. In 2003, the group released their first single, "Boom Bang Bombay", under the name Custerd.

On New Year's Day 2004, the Transit Kings appeared live in Tokyo. In 2005, they released the Token EP,< and performed live (without Cauty) at the Big Chill Festival. In 2006 they released a limited edition set of three colored vinyl 7" singles on Malicious Damage featuring the songs "America Is Unavailable" (Red), "Japanese Cars" (Amber), and "Butterflies and Boom" (Green). They released their first album Living in a Giant Candle Winking at God in August 2006. The "sample-tastic" house album featured guest appearances from The Smiths guitarist Johnny Marr and comedian Simon Day. The Times called it "Orb-lite" and proclaimed it to be "Deep Forest-style sludge".

Cauty left the band in 2004 to work on other projects; the official website has him listed as on "Co-Pilot (on extended leave): Graybeard". He is, however, listed as a composer on seven of the Transit Kings' debut album's twelve tracks.

== Discography ==
- "Token" EP (2005, Malicious Damage, Cat: MD602)
- "The Red Single" (2006, Malicious Damage, Limited Edition 7" Vinyl Single)
- "The Amber Single" (2006, Malicious Damage, Limited Edition 7" Vinyl Single)
- "The Green Single" (2006, Malicious Damage, Limited Edition 7" Vinyl Single)
- Living in a Giant Candle Winking at God (2006, Malicious Damage)
