= Dodger (TV series) =

2022 family television series

- Genre: Comedy drama
- Created by: Rhys Thomas
- Inspired by: Oliver Twist by Charles Dickens
- Written by: Lucy Montgomery; Rhys Thomas
- Directed by: Rhys Thomas
- Starring: Billy Jenkins; Christopher Eccleston; Aabay Ali; Saira Choudhry; Ellie-May Sheridan; Mila Lieu; Connor Curren; David Threlfall; Sam C. Wilson; Rhys Thomas; Javone Prince; Lucy Montgomery; Lenny Rush
- Country of origin: United Kingdom
- Original language: English
- No. of series: 1 + 4 specials
- No. of episodes: 14 in total

Production
- Executive producers: Mark Freeland; Amy Buscombe; Lucy Montgomery; Rhys Thomas
- Producers: Francis Gilson and Lauriel Martin
- Cinematography: Pete Rowe
- Editor: Christopher Bird
- Camera setup: Single-camera
- Running time: 45 / 55 minutes
- Production company: BBC Studios Kids & Family (2023) Universal International Studios

Original release
- Network: CBBC
- Release: 6 February 2022 – present

Dodger is a British family comedy drama series, inspired by the Artful Dodger from the novel Oliver Twist by Charles Dickens. The series serves as a prequel to the events of Oliver Twist. The first 10 episodes launched on 9 February 2022, on BBC iPlayer and were repeated on BBC One. Series One was followed by four specials, 'Train' in November 2022, 'Christmas' in December 2022, 'Bad Egg' on Easter Saturday 2023 and 'Coronation' in November 2023. The series cast was led by Christopher Eccleston as Fagin and Billy Jenkins as Dodger.

Following a BAFTA, RTS and Writer's Guild Award, a Christmas Special for 2023 was commissioned by the BBC.

== Premise ==
Set in 1830s Victorian London, the series revolves around Jack Dawkins, better known as the Artful Dodger, and his exploits as part of Fagin's gang, prior to his introduction in Oliver Twist.

== Cast ==
=== Main ===
- Billy Jenkins as Jack Dawkins/Dodger
- Christopher Eccleston as Fagin
- Aabay Ali as Charley Bates
- Ellie-May Sheridan as Polly Crackitt
- Mila Lieu as Tang
- Connor Curren as Tom Chitling
- David Threlfall as Chief of Police, Sir Charles Rowan
- Sam C. Wilson as Bill Sikes
- Rhys Thomas as PC Duff
- Javone Prince as PC Blathers
- Lucy Montgomery as Minnie Bilge, Fagin's landlady
- Saira Choudhry as Nancy
- Lenny Rush as Morgan (series 2; recurring series 1)

=== Recurring ===
- Aron von Andrian as Prince Albert
- Tanya Reynolds as Queen Victoria (series 1)
- Lorraine Bruce as Mrs Grundles
- Alex Kingston as Lucifer
- James Fleet as Judge Fang
- Tony Way as Jon The News

=== Guest stars ===
- Nicola Coughlan as Queen Victoria (series 2)
- Toby Stephens as Martin Van Buren
- Paul Whitehouse as Chief Yeoman
- Simon Callow as Archbishop of Canterbury
- Robert Lindsay as the Prime Minister
- Jane Horrocks as Countess Cowper
- John Thomson as Mr Grundles
- Julian Barratt as Mr Greenwood
- Danny John Jules as Mr Rossini
- Anita Dobson as Bertha the Toymaker
- Austin Haynes as George Minnow

== Production ==
In May 2021, it was announced in a press release that CBBC had commissioned a ten-part series, following the Artful Dodger's exploits, to be produced by NBCUniversal International Studios, a division of Universal Studio Group.

Principal photography for the first series took place in Manchester and various locations around North West England. Shooting for the fifth episode took place at Grand Theatre, Blackpool.

Production on three special episodes took place over the summer of 2022 and wrapped in Bristol in September. Filming took place at Bristol's The Bottle Yard Studios and on location in the city.

The Christmas Special was filmed at Luton Hoo doubling as Saffron Hill and St Alban's Cathedral as Westminster Abbey. In 2023 Another Christmas special was announced and BBC Studios Kids & Family joined in on production.

=== Music ===
The series features original music written by Joel Cadbury and Will Harper.

== Episodes ==
=== Series 1 (2022) ===
No. overall	No. in season	Title	Directed by	Written by	Original release date
1	1	"Runaways"	Rhys Thomas	Unknown	February 6, 2022
2	2	"Waxworks"	Rhys Thomas	Lucy Montgomery, Rhys Thomas	February 13, 2022
3	3	"Imposter"	Rhys Thomas	Lucy Montgomery	February 20, 2022
4	4	"Mudlarks"	Hildegard Ryan, Rhys Thomas	Lucy Montgomery, Rhys Thomas	February 27, 2022
5	5	"Phantom"	Rhys Thomas	Lucy Montgomery, Rhys Thomas	March 6, 2022
6	6	"Mummy"	Rhys Thomas	Lucy Montgomery, Rhys Thomas	March 13, 2022
7	7	"Nancy"	Rhys Thomas	Charlie Higson, Lucy Montgomery, Rhys Thomas	March 20, 2022
8	8	"Carnival"	Rhys Thomas	Lucy Montgomery, Rhys Thomas	March 27, 2022
9	9	"Dosh"	Rhys Thomas	Steven Burge, Lucy Montgomery, Rhys Thomas	April 3, 2022
10	10	"Revenge"	Rhys Thomas	Lucy Montgomery, Rhys Thomas	April 10, 2022

=== 2022 specials ===
No. overall	No. in season	Title	Directed by	Written by	Original release date
11	-	"Train"	Rhys Thomas	Lucy Montgomery, Rhys Thomas	November 27, 2022
12	-	"Christmas"	Rhys Thomas	Lucy Montgomery, Rhys Thomas	December 4, 2022

=== 2023 specials ===
No. overall	No. in season	Title	Directed by	Written by	Original release date
13	-	"Bad Egg"	Rhys Thomas	Lucy Montgomery, Rhys Thomas	April 7, 2023
14	-	"Christmas"	Rhys Thomas	Lucy Montgomery, Rhys Thomas	December 3, 2023

== Release ==
The first 5 episodes were made available on BBC iPlayer on 6 February 2022, after the first episode premiered on CBBC in the United Kingdom, with episodes airing weekly on the CBBC channel. Episodes 6–10 were later made available on BBC iPlayer on 13 March 2022, after the sixth episode aired on CBBC. The first series started airing weekly on the BBC's flagship channel, BBC One, from 13 March 2022.

The first two episodes in a series of three one-off specials premiered on the CBBC channel on 27 November and 4 December 2022. The third special premiered on the CBBC channel on 7 April 2023.

NBCUniversal Global Distribution is handling international sales for the show.

=== Reception ===
The first series was the most watched CBBC commissioned programme between September 2021 and September 2022.

== Awards and nominations ==
Year	Award	Category	Nominee(s)	Result
2022	British Academy Children's Awards	Director	Rhys Thomas	Nominated
2022	British Academy Children's Awards	Scripted	Dodger	Won
2022	British Academy Children's Awards	Writer	Lucy Montgomery, Rhys Thomas	Nominated

- Royal Television Society Best Children's Programme 2023
- Writer's Guild of Great Britain Awards Best Children/Youth Programme
- Rose d'Or Nominated 2022
