= Fun at the Funeral Parlour =

2001–2002 British TV series

- Genre: Comedy
- Written by: Rhys Thomas
- Directed by: Peter Boyd MacLean (1st); Christine Gernon (2nd)
- Starring: Rhys Thomas as Percy; William Thomas as Ivor; Alex Lowe as Arwell; Tony Way as Gwynne
- Country of origin: United Kingdom
- Original language: English / Welsh
- No. of series: 2
- No. of episodes: 13

Production
- Running time: 30 minutes

Original release
- Network: BBC Choice
- Release: 1 January 2001 – 12 March 2002

Fun at the Funeral Parlour is a comedy series broadcast on BBC Choice and BBC Three for two series in 2001 and 2002. It is set in a Welsh funeral directors called "Thomas, Thomas, Thomas and Thomas". It is set around the Swansea area of south Wales in the fictitious town of Trebanos in tribute to the writer's father who came from the real town in that area.

The series was written by Rhys Thomas with the script edited by Charlie Higson. Rhys also starred in the show alongside William Thomas, Alex Lowe and Tony Way. Thomas created the show at the age of 20, after contributing to The Fast Show becoming the youngest person ever to create, write, and star in their own TV sitcom. The second series featured a theme tune written and performed by Queen's guitarist, Brian May. He and the producer of the series, Simon Lupton, went on to work with Brian May and Queen on numerous DVDs and Queen documentaries.

== Characters ==
=== Main characters ===
Ivor Thomas

A single father, and head of the household and the company. In some ways, he is slightly backward; but in most ways, he is surprisingly sharp for a Welsh bumpkin. He has a phobia about dead bodies but manages quite well with the aid of his three sons to whom he is devoted. Because death means business, he is constantly hoping for people to die.

Arwell Thomas (33 years old)

Of the sons, it is Arwell who seems closest to Ivor—he often confides in his father about personal matters. He hopes to one day meet and marry someone with whom he can have children and build a life. But until he meets his wife-to-be, the main love in his life is his Fiat Panda.

Gwynne Thomas

Gwynne has a mental deficiency (on one occasion, he pulls one of his own teeth with a pair of pliers). Despite his subtle impairment, he receives no special treatment from Ivor and is expected to perform his duties regardless.

Percy Thomas

The most intelligent of them all and with a devious streak.

=== Recurring characters ===
Larry Nazareth

The cigar smoking Lord Mayor played by Mark Williams, makes an appearance in both series 1 and 2. A keen otter lover he has two of them as pets. His other interests include rating his "double deckers" in the toilet bowl and collecting dialysis machines.

A shrewd man he sees an opportunity of exploiting "Arwell the Elephant-man" and converting the parlour into a freak-show called "The Undertakers From Hell" (2.2). Perhaps seen as a personal friend to Ivor, who rings up (the unseen) Nazareth for legal help when rival undertakers move in on the Thomas' patch.

He is married to an unnamed woman but this does not stop him from being caught in the woods, his trousers down in an uncompromising position with a hunting decoy (1.2).

Rival funeral directors

The first set of rival funeral directors in the town are the Bennet brothers (played by James Duke and David Sibley), a set of once conjoined siamese twins who were "joined at the satchels". They are the joint father of their daughter, Sian played by Wendy Wason who becomes a love interest to both Arwell and Percy in the two shows that she appears in.

Although the family members do not appear in every episode in series one, there are referenced several times.

They are ruthless, training "Roger" their pet wolf to kill so that they can profit from the victims' burials. They also show a similar temperament when it comes to a suitable partner for Sian and if discovered they would cut off Arwell's balls before feeding him to the pigs. However, they appear to be less savvy with business and turned down $1m when a group of Yanks come into town wishing to a buy a business as part of a global franchise of Africa, Asia and Wales.

The Bennets are not mentioned in series 2 but the Thomas business is still seen as the second best in the town when a commemorative plaque placed on the walls of the Thomas' new establishment is unveiled by the mayor. It reads "Thomas, Thomas, Thomas and Thomas The Second most Scariest Funeral Directors"

Another group of directors finally make an appearance in 2.4. These being a pair of unscrupulous, chimney-loving Englishmen banned from operating in their own land due to the way they operate their fast funeral service. They are played by Phil Cornwell and sidekick.

Shaking Stephens

"Wales' Best Shakin' Stevens Impersonator" who first appears at a comeback concert down the local legion where 13 tickets have been sold. During this evening "Green Door" is sung continuously. He is a keen James Bond fan, always taking locker 007 when he goes for a swim and asks that his slush puppies are shaken not stirred.

In his second and final appearance is in the series 1 finale, he is killed off when he falls into a skip while at the swimming pool (again singing "Green Door"). He is managed by Isaac Hunt who insists on a sendoff in true show biz style. Hence, there is a rock band playing "Another One Bites the Dust" at his funeral with contract papers signed on top of his coffin.

Harrison Ford

Local newsagent, purveyor of "MAGS 'N' FAGS" as displayed above his shop in the font from "Raiders of the Lost Ark". The character charges extortionate prices for his goods and has an unhealthy habit of trying to sell inappropriate items from the top shelf to his younger customers, often through innuendo. The character (who also speaks a smattering of Welsh) only appears in 3 episodes of series one but the actor Paul Whitehouse who plays him makes a reappearance in series two as another unrelated character.

Billy

A schoolboy who appears 3 times in Ford's shop as a customer. He is often given "mucky" freebies by Ford, and is eventually extorted by him on his birthday when he mistakenly buys some "penny" chews marked up as "pound" sweets.

Gate Shutter

A shy, non-speaking feral boy with an obsession for closing iron gates, such as those at the front of the Thomas' drive and the churchyard. He often conducts his habit when no one is around.

When interviewed for the position of a trainee undertaker, Ivor asks what is his occupation. Unable to speak, he grunts and gestures for a pen and paper with which he draws a picture and Ivor works out he is a "Gate shutter".

In his 4 appearances in series 1 he is not credited but is believed to be played by the producer Simon Lupton.

Pablo

A fellow jailbird whom Percy met in the canteen on his first day whilst he was doing time. Due to his small stature he was hidden in a suitcase during Percy's second escape and his first through the sewers. His freedom and 2 appearances were short lived as he was killed by the jaws of doom in 1.2.

PC Hertz and PC Boone

The local police constables who have a warrant to search the parlour for Percy (E1.1) and also warn the Thomases that there is a beast running amok in the village (E1.2). PC Hertz (played by Kai Owen) does most of the talking whilst his sidekick Boone (Mark Fleischmann) is more interested in collecting the autographs of the dead, such as Mr Boubes. They become very unpopular when they cancel the parish "boot sale" as a fallout of the wolf attacks. Both actors make returns in later shows as a series of unrelated characters.

The vicar

For series 1 James Duke appears 3 times and plays a very cynical vicar who had an affair with Janet/Joan Jones the tragic victim of "the Heron incident" 1.3. The actor playing this role also plays one of the Bennet brothers.

Father Pertwee

In series 2 Paul Whitehouse's character Father Pertwee first appears in the first episode as a blond, long-haired vicar who uses innuendo during the funerals he performs. He is then "introduced" in the credits a further 2 times during the second run. He is partial to taking back-handers for the church roof fund, happily swapping the coffins in a "Dog Dango Afternoon" (2.6) thus allowing Percy to swindle his family out of the proceeds of a bank robbery. Although he is happy to use magic as part of his funerals he is not keen on clowns.

Paul Daniels

Visual references are made to the famous magician Paul Daniels in two episodes of series 2. A bottle of "Paul Daniels Magic Whisky" is poured during 2.3 and then in 2.6 we see a large inspirational poster of the man pinned up in the hotel room of failed magician Clifford Daxon.

Issac Hunt

Across both series Matt Lucas portrays "the most powerful and influential music agent in Wales". Through his company Mumbles Records, he represents a number of acts, which he refers as his "butties". These stars include tribute singer Shaking Stephens, and failed magician Cliff Daxon whom he has looked after for 12 years. He also represents the "World famous "Davy G" Music Maestro (as seen on TV in 1983)" and a newly signed up Queen tribute band, "The Thomas Brothers from Trebanos".

Hunt appears to be a frustrated gameshow host as (depending on the response) he likes to reply to the answers of his clients with expressions such as "Quack-quack-oops", "Ah-Er" and "Bing - The top answer".

He has an appetite for "hussies" which help him cope when someone dies, and has one waiting for him off screen in each of his 2 featured episodes.

Ivor tries to explain to Arwell that the manager's name is a rather unfortunate joke and a play on words that refers to sexual organs. Ironically Ivor overlooks the fact that he, himself is called "Ivor Thomas".

Fernando Thomas and her midget partner, Rocky

The boys' mother is first mentioned in show 1.1 where she is said to have run off with a movie star (well an Oompa-Loompa from the Willy Wonka and the chocolate factory film) some 25 years ago. References to her wearing oversized and unattractive blue pants are made when Ivor has a clear out in 1.2. She is again mentioned in 1.3 where she is described as Spaniard who ran off with a midget some 20 years ago. Ivor predicts that she is now short and bald, and with hanging tits. However, when he recognises the smell of "lobster, olive oil and sweat" in 2.6 what appears to be the reality is very different as Anita Dobson returns as his tall, attractive estranged wife. Accompanied by Rocky (Christopher Ryan) her orange skinned, green haired Oompa-Loompa sized partner, she has come home and now wants to get a divorce after nearly 25 years apart.

Wooing her to try and keep his boys and the family business, Ivor reveals some intimate facts about Fernando such as her hairy chest and armpits, along with a mole on her left shoulder that puts him off his Coco Pops.

The reality however is very different, as Fernando and Rocky are actually a pair of very well researched con artists called Chiquitita and O'Ryan, who want to make money for their sponge project that "exfoliates, conditions, and bumps at the same time".

=== Other notable characters (non-recurring) ===
Mrs Marion Boubes

Played by Joanna Scanlan, she appears in 1.1 and is the wife of the first person to die in the series, the aptly named Dai. Her grief does not appear to last that long as she has an enjoyable liaison with Ivor in the funeral parlour whilst on a visit to see her husband in the chapel of rest.

Father Titmus

The Irish priest of St Barney's Church who incorrectly predicts that the beast rampaging the village in 1.2 is the devil's child who is being looked after by the American ambassador. The reality is that he has been tailing a jello manufacturer from Ohio for days. The lighting scene from The Omen is then partially reenacted but sadly Father Titmus's predictions are wrong and he does not meet his destiny and die via the "Act of God" but rather falls victim to the first attack (seen during the show) of the hound that appears throughout the rest of this episode. The character is played by Matt Lucas.

Quimby

A wolf hunter all his life who for a bounty will not only catch but kill and gut an animal in 1.2. Experienced, he is keen to tell stories of his adventures through his scars, whether they are caused by his prey, self-inflicted or by his wife. His methods are more akin to catching a shark as his flatbed truck "WOLF 1" is full of ropes, fishing buoys and a shark cage. The latter appears to be a place where he drinks his beer and sings in a drunken manner. He expresses an interest in working alone but appears to have a sidekick with a weak heart called Dirk, who is killed off by Quimby's deadly breath. Requiring further help he employs the Thomas lads to be his cabin boys and discovers that like Percy, Quimby has an interest in dirty books and using of KY jelly. Played by Tom Baker, the character has a fashion for keeping a starfish in his trousers and is also obsessed with him and his crew wearing gloves. So much so that when Quimby becomes "Roger the wolf"'s last victim we find he has "died with his gloves on".

Ken Kennel

A carpenter who specialises in construction of the "ACME No. 8 Kennel", he believes in godly retribution when people such as Ivor do not offer him a cup of tea. Following people around until revenge has been meted out. Steve Furst plays him and several other characters in Series 1.

"Rodger" the dog and "Lisa"

Rodger is owned by the rival Bennets, it has been trained to kill so that they can profit from these deaths. The animal is known to be responsible for three deaths in episode 1.2. (Father Titmus, Pablo and Quimby). Perhaps there are more as the Bennets have a coffin filled full of money when the Thomases visit to challenge them.

With concern in the village, the Mayor puts up a bounty for its capture of £3000. Percy is as unscrupulous as his rivals and sets about trying to capture his own "Killing machine" with the help of Arwell and Quimby the wolf hunter.

To help in the capture of Rodger, Percy makes him a girlfriend called "Lisa" for £2.50 ("50 bob") out of bits of fur, wood, plastic feet and some old castors. A blender is hidden in her "Calcutta" to trap the randy Rodger, this addition works as first Ivor and then Larry become ensnared by Lisa. To make her more attractive she has makeup applied by Percy who also coiffeurs her fur.

Percy eventually bonds with Rodger and decides to set him free once he has taken a mocked-up picture of his capture to help claim the reward. Unfortunately, Rodger was mistakenly shot by Gwynne on Thursday 20 July 2000 (according to the reward cheque).

As with many of the show's endings there is a disclaimer saying, "The producers would like to give an assurance that no animals were harmed in the making of this programme." The animal that plays Rodger is trained to do tricks, and you can clearly see him move from his lying down position during the end credits. The dog itself is not listed but appears to be some sort of husky breed.

== Guest stars ==
Series 1 guests include:

- Charlie Higson, Paul Whitehouse, and Mark Williams (all from The Fast Show)
- David Mitchell and Robert Webb (Mitchell and Webb)
- Tom Baker (Doctor Who)
- Brian Blessed as himself
- Steve Furst and Matt Lucas (Little Britain)
- Bill Oddie as himself (The Goodies)
- Kai Owen (Rocket Man)
- Mark Fleischmann
- Joanna Scanlan (Getting On)
- Comedian Wendy Wason
- James Duke
- David Sibley

Series 2 guests include:

- Simon Day, Paul Whitehouse, and Mark Williams (all from The Fast Show)
- Vas Blackwood
- Christopher Cazenove,
- Keith Chegwin
- Anita Dobson
- Matt Lucas (Little Britain)
- Philip Madoc
- Kai Owen (Rocket Man)
- Tim Wylton
- Christopher Ryan
- Art Malik
- Phil Cornwell
- Nerys Hughes

== Episode guide ==
Series 1

No. Overall	No. in season	Episode Title	Written by	Directed by	Airdate in UK
1	1	"Death in the Valleys"	Rhys Thomas	Peter Boyd MacLean	02-01-2001
It's an important day for Thomas, Thomas, Thomas & Thomas Funeral Directors as Ivor unveils a new addition to the firm that will revolutionise their business - the telephone.
No. Overall	No. in season	Episode Title	Written by	Directed by	Airdate in UK
2	2	"The Jaws of Doom"	Rhys Thomas	Peter Boyd MacLean	08-01-2001
Ivor Thomas is a worried man, his business is doing badly, a wolf is discovered to be behind the mysterious deaths and Percy has escaped from prison.
No.Overall	No. in season	Episode Title	Written by	Directed by	Airdate in UK
3	3	"The Heron Incident"	Rhys Thomas	Peter Boyd MacLean	15-01-2001
Bill Oddie is trying to the woo the woman of his dreams when she is killed in a freak Heron accident. Another job for Thomas, Thomas, Thomas & Thomas.
No. Overall	No. in season	Episode Title	Written by	Directed by	Airdate in UK
4	4	"The Mountains of Doom"	Rhys Thomas	Peter Boyd MacLean	22-01-2001
When Mr Davies is killed in an OAP scooter rage attack, his wife has some specific requests for Ivor Thomas and his boys. She wants his ashes to be scattered on a secret lake.
No. Overall	No. in season	Episode Title	Written by	Directed by	Airdate in UK
5	5	"Blue Ice"	Rhys Thomas	Peter Boyd MacLean	29-01-2001
Farmer Raymond is killed by a block of ice dropped from a passing plane. The parlour is infiltrated by the undercover journalist Donal MulofKintyre.
No. Overall	No. in season	Episode Title	Written by	Directed by	Airdate in UK
6	6	"Dead Aid"	Rhys Thomas	Peter Boyd MacLean	05·02·2001
The services of Thomas, Thomas, Thomas & Thomas Funeral Directors are called upon when Shaking Stevens, a local impersonator, is found dead in a skip.

Series 2

No. Overall	No. in season	Episode Title	Written by	Directed by	Airdate in UK
7	1	"The Balls of Doom"	Rhys Thomas	Christine Gernon	22-01-2002
Arwell is feeling lonely and depressed. He sinks even further when he learns that Penelope, his childhood sweetheart, has been killed by a tennis ball serving machine
No. Overall	No. in season	Episode Title	Written by	Directed by	Airdate in UK
8	2	"Polterghoost"	Rhys Thomas	Christine Gernon	29-01-2002
There is a power cut and, without TV, the family are forced to play board games instead. When Percy discovers a Ouija Board, the Thomases unwittingly summon the evil spirit of John Merrick - the Elephant Man,
No.Overall	No. in season	Episode Title	Written by	Directed by	Airdate in UK
9	3	"A Pocket Full of Gravel"	Rhys Thomas	Christine Gernon	05-02-2002
The death of a local Lord promises huge financial and romantic rewards for Ivor, if only he could overcome his phobia of corpses.
No. Overall	No. in season	Episode Title	Written by	Directed by	Airdate in UK
10	4	"Gwynne's Marvelous Medicine"	Rhys Thomas	Christine Gernon	12-02-2002
A mysterious visitor sends Ivor, Percy, Arwell and Gwynne on the biggest adventure of their lives.
No. Overall	No. in season	Episode Title	Written by	Directed by	Airdate in UK
11	5	"Marooned"	Rhys Thomas	Christine Gernon	19-02-2002
The Thomases must travel to a remote island when a contestant on a reality TV show is killed by a helium balloon.
No. Overall	No. in season	Episode Title	Written by	Directed by	Airdate in UK
12	6	"Dog Dago Afternoon"	Rhys Thomas	Christine Gernon	26·02·2002
When the amazing magical Cliff Daxon loses control of his fake ostrich and falls out of a window, the impending funeral presents a new challenge for the Funeral Directors.
No. Overall	No. in season	Episode Title	Written by	Directed by	Airdate in UK
13	7	"Moira Stewart & The Clown Syndrome"	Rhys Thomas	Christine Gernon	05-03-2002
Final episode from the Welsh family funeral directors. A karaoke night at the local legion turns sour following the discovery of a dead clown.

== Locations ==
=== Series 1 ===
Quimby's storage locker for his hunting gear in "Jaws of Doom" is the Big Pit National Coal Museum in Blaenavon

The bulk of the interior filming was carried out at Lululaund Cottages in Melbourne Road, Bushey Heath not far from Bushey Studios.

The room where the coffins were filmed was an upstairs bedroom. In order to give the impression that the coffins were next to "The Parlour", with the characters apparently going next door to visit the coffins, a real door was fixed to a blank wall in the downstairs room.

=== Series 2 ===
Towards the end of "Balls of Doom" (while "Forever Autumn" is playing), we see Arwell riding his motorised scooter along the road. This was shot in Llansawel, heading southwest past the Swan Fach cottage, over the stone bridge, past the 1957 Neuadd Llansawel Community Hall, and the Black Lion Hotel, and on toward the B4337. This stretch of road features in most episodes – usually as part of the route of a funeral procession. The Community Hall also features in "Moira Stewart & The Clown Syndrome" and "'A Pocket Full of Gravel".

The church is St David's in Abergwili and features in most episodes of Series 2.

Burry Port Lighthouse (home to Dudley Sutton's character Bentley Nimmo) and the town's yacht club are unmistakable in "Marooned" the fourth show in series 2. The surrounding beach and dunes also feature in this episode.

== DVD release ==
The 2006 DVD Set

- Disc 1: Series 2 out of order, aspect ratio is 16:9
- Disc 2: Series 1 in correct order, aspect ratio is 4:3

One explanation for the reversal may be that Series 2 is arguably better than Series 1.

Series 2 was left open-ended with the supposedly dead character Marshall Jeepster JR III disappearing at the end, his sidekick Bilko uttering that "I can see this happening another 7 times". This could have promised viewers another series, however, with nothing forthcoming perhaps the producers of the DVD thought that the ending of Series 1 makes a better clean break. In the series 1 finale, Ivor sells up to the Americans and is "set up for life". He then gives his blessing to his sons'newly signed band with the promise of tours to Osaka and Centre Parcs. In the words of Issac Hunt "Here's to the first day of the rest of your lives"

This theory would be OK as most episodes are stand alone, however, this does not work out for the timeline of the boys' mother Fernando Thomas as her length of absence from the family is mentioned in both series. Therefore, watching the episodes in the order supplied in the DVD does allow things to flow correctly.

A more plausible explanation might be found on the back of the DVD

""Fun at the Funeral Parlour" is a sitcom without rules, where anything can and often does happen."

== Language used ==
Whilst the majority of the show is performed in English it is based in and around Swansea where there are Welsh speakers. Although English is used throughout so as to make the story flow, there are some basic Welsh phrases used throughout the two seasons.

The most commonly used expressions is "Iechyd da" (good health) and is used throughout the 2 series by the Thomas family when greeting each other. Other words are also used within the family for terms of endearment. A play on words of these expressions is made on more than one occasion when Ivor is greeted by his sons with "Iechyd da Da".

Harrison Ford also uses a little Welsh. He describes Billy as "Boi bach" (small boy) and describes Percy as "uch y fi" (horrible) when he asks for some porno mags.

One prominent building used for many of the scenes is NEUADD LLANSAWEL. This being the "Hall" in the village of LLANSAWEL with the words carved into the walls of the building

In episode 2.6 there is a small amount of Spanish used when Fernando Thomas turns up, most of this is translated by Rocky. However, a version of the ongoing joke about a character asking lots of questions at once and the other character not knowing which question to respond to is not translated. It is left for the sharp viewers to notice this.
