= Freddie Mercury: The Great Pretender =

- Promotional image
- Genre: Documentary
- Directed by: Rhys Thomas
- Starring: Freddie Mercury (archival footage)
- Country of origin: United Kingdom
- Original language: English

Production
- Producers: Rhys Thomas; Jim Beach; Joss Crowley
- Cinematography: Ric Clark
- Editor: Christopher Bird
- Running time: 65 minutes (UK TV edit); 1:25:05 (standard TV version); 1:47:00 (DVD director's cut version)
- Production companies: Eagle Rock; Mercury Songs Ltd

Original release
- Network: BBC One
- Release: 16 October 2012

Freddie Mercury: The Great Pretender is a 2012 British feature-length documentary film about Queen singer Freddie Mercury and his attempt to forge a solo career. The film is a venture co-produced by EMP and Mercury Songs for Eagle Rock Entertainment, with Eagle Rock serving as distributor.

Directed by Rhys Thomas and produced by Thomas, Jim Beach, and Joss Crowley, the documentary premiered on BBC One in edited form as part of the Imagine series, and later the director's cut was shown on BBC Four. It won an International Emmy Award and a Rose d'Or.

== Production ==
=== Development ===
The film was produced and directed by Rhys Thomas, a lifelong Queen fan and expert. Thomas focused on archive material of Mercury, going back to 1976 in search of footage to show the story of Mercury's life, his career, and his solo projects outside of Queen, including the Mr. Bad Guy album. The producer, editor and director of photography were also behind the 2011 BBC documentary Queen: Days of Our Lives.

== Release ==
The film was exclusively broadcast on the British channel BBC One on 16 October 2012 at 10:35pm in England and Scotland and 11:05pm in Wales and Northern Ireland with an edited version of 65 minutes. The documentary coincided with the release of the new Barcelona Special Edition album with Mercury and Caballé's original album re-recorded with a full 80-piece orchestra (a feature on the making of this album is included on both formats) and a new book, also entitled The Great Pretender, with matching artwork.

=== Marketing ===
On 6 September 2012 the official trailer was released on YouTube by Eagle Rock Entertainment.

=== Home media ===
The Great Pretender was released on DVD, Blu-ray and digital download through Eagle Vision Media on 24 September 2012. It was released in the United States on 25 September from Eagle Rock Entertainment. The length of the film on home media is approximately 1 hour 47 minutes. All formats include the extended version that was not aired on BBC One. The bonus features added on DVD and Blu-ray are "Freddie Mercury Goes Solo", a seven-minute interview, an extended seven-minute interview with Montserrat Caballé, and a five-minute documentary, Making Barcelona: Special Edition 2012.

The film debuted at #3 on the Official UK Music Video Chart on 30 September 2012, based on sales of DVDs and other physical formats.

=== Broadcasts ===
After the original BBC One broadcast in October, an extended director's cut aired on BBC Four on 29 and 30 December 2012 and then on BBC Four HD at 11:00pm on 5 January 2013. It gained 3.5 million viewers when aired on BBC One and a further 1.2 million when shown on BBC Four. The director's cut features 25 minutes of extra footage. It was also aired in Australia on ABC2 in December 2012 with it being aired again in 2018 on SBS due to the release of the biographical film Bohemian Rhapsody. The documentary was broadcast on British television channel Pick on 20 April 2019 to coincide with the 27th anniversary of The Freddie Mercury Tribute Concert.

== Reception ==
=== Critical response ===
Sarah Rainey for The Telegraph wrote "with so much of Mercury's career already explored, and legions of Queen fans attending sell-out We Will Rock You performances in the West End (now in its 10th year), it is difficult to tread new ground. But Yentob's affectionate tribute captured Mercury in a new light." Guardian critic Caroline Sullivan said, "In the BBC programme – its title taken from a 1987 solo single – Mercury emerges as anything but boring. Skittish, exasperating and endearing, yes, but never dull."

=== Awards and nominations ===
Award	Date of ceremony	Category	Recipient(s) and nominee(s)	Result	Ref(s)
British Academy Film Awards	10 February 2013	Breakthrough Talent	Rhys Thomas (Director)	Nominated	
Rose d'Or	30 May 2013	Arts	Freddie Mercury: The Great Pretender	Won	
International Emmy Award	25 November 2013	Arts Programming	Freddie Mercury: The Great Pretender	Won	

== Charts ==
Chart (2012)	Peak position	Ref(s)
Australian Top 40 DVDs Chart (ARIA)	6	
Austrian Music DVDs (Ö3 Austria)	5	
Belgian (Flanders) Music DVDs (Ultratop)	3	
Belgian (Wallonia) Music DVDs (Ultratop)	1	
Dutch Music DVD Chart (MegaCharts)	3	
Swiss Music DVD Chart (Hitparade)	7	
UK Official Music Video (OCC)	3	
US Music Video Sales (Billboard)	4	
