= Saturday Zoo =

British comedy series

- Starring: Jonathan Ross
- No. of episodes: 13

Release
- Original network: Channel 4
- Original release: 16 January – 10 April 1993

Saturday Zoo is a British alternative comedy and chat show series, featuring an eclectic mix of stand-up acts, interviews and music. Hosted by Jonathan Ross, it ran for 13 episodes, beginning in January 1993, on Channel 4.

== Production ==
The series was produced by host Jonathan Ross's own production company, Channel X, headed by Kenton Allen. Unlike previous shows, Ross specifically designed it to be "a show that I want to watch" without being particularly interested in viewing figures or popularity. The show was broadcast live, with no possibility of retakes or editing. Writers for the series included Kevin Day and Patrick Marber. The music director and keyboard player was Janette Mason, who also wrote the show's theme tune.

== Guests ==
The series had a number of high-profile guests, including supermodel Naomi Campbell who appeared on the first episode. Other guests included Kylie Minogue, Danny DeVito, Christopher Walken and Jean-Claude Van Damme. Penn & Teller also performed, making their first live appearance on a UK television programme. Musical guests included former Dexys Midnight Runners frontman Kevin Rowland, Del Amitri, Suzanne Vega, Stereo MCs and P.M. Dawn, and k.d. lang performed her recent hit single, "Constant Craving".

The show featured the first appearance on television of Steve Coogan's character Paul Calf, and helped launch the career of political comedian Mark Thomas. Rowland Rivron and Graham Fellows (performing in-character as John Shuttleworth) made regular appearances on the show. The Fast Show's Simon Day featured in several sketches.

== Critical reception ==
Saturday Zoo was not well received by critics, who focused on Ross's omnipresence on television at the time. A review in The Independent described Ross as "humour-resistant Teflon". It was subsequently viewed as stalling Ross's high-profile career.
