= Living in a Giant Candle Winking at God =

Studio album by Transit Kings
- Released: August 21, 2006
- Genre: Electronica, trip hop, downtempo, drum and bass
- Length: 65:07
- Label: Malicious Damage
- Producer: Alex Paterson, Jimmy Cauty, Guy Pratt, Dom Beken

Living in a Giant Candle Winking at God is the debut album by the Transit Kings. It featured guest appearances from The Smiths guitarist Johnny Marr and comedian Simon Day. The Times called it "Orb-lite" and proclaimed it to be "Deep Forest-style sludge".

Though Jimmy Cauty left the Transit Kings before the release of Living in a Giant Candle Winking at God, he received a credit as composer on seven of the album's tracks.

== Track listing ==
1. "The West End Of A Duck Going East" (6:12)
2. "Stop Over (Dance With Me)" (0:10)
3. "Concourse" (7:16)
  - Vocals - Juliet Russell
4. "Boom (Bombay)" (5:42)
  - Vocals - Missy MC
5. "Oh Shit" (4:02)
  - Strings" - Chi3
6. "Baby Don't" (5:17)
  - Trumpet, Flugel - Quentin Collins
7. "Japanese Cars (Album Mix)" (4:56)
8. "Free Free" (8:08)
  - Strings - Chi3
  - Vocals - Jonathan Kydd, Juliet Russell, William Butler Yeats
9. "Blooze Tracks" (5:19)
10. "America Is Unavailable" (Album Mix) (5:21)
  - Guitar - Johnny Marr
11. "Wagon Wheels" (6:06)
  - Trumpet, Flugel - Quentin Collins
12. "The Last Lighthouse Keeper" (6:38)
  - Vocals - Simon Day

Extra Tracks on the Japanese release:

1. "Butterflies" (4:31)
2. "America is Unavailable" [sss ding dong mix] (4:41)
