= Tony Way =

English actor

- Born: 7 October 1978 (age 47); Rochford, Essex, England
- Occupations: Actor, writer, comedian
- Years active: 1994–present

Tony Paul Way (born 7 October 1978) is an English actor, comedian, and writer. He is best known for playing characters in British comedy TV series including Extras, After Life, Black Books and Bang, Bang, It's Reeves and Mortimer, as well as comedy movies including Sightseers and Ali G Indahouse. He has since moved into serious drama, appearing as Plague in The Girl with the Dragon Tattoo, Dontos Hollard in HBO's Game of Thrones, and Thomas Nashe in Anonymous.

== Career ==
Way started his career in comedy and acting at the age of 17 when he, Rhys Thomas, Stephen Burge, and Glynne Wiley started making comedy videos as sketch group Stay Alive, Pepi while at college. The videos were noticed by Bob Mortimer and Charlie Higson, who gave Way his first television appearances in a sketch on The Fast Show and in several sketches in Bang, Bang, It's Reeves and Mortimer. Way went on to write for and perform in more comedy shows, including Blunder, Mongrels, Extras, Spaced, and Tittybangbang.

Way has also performed in television shows and films, including The Girl with the Dragon Tattoo, Anonymous, Tunnel of Love, Finding Neverland, Cheeky, Ali G Indahouse, Fairytales, Down Terrace and Sightseers. From 2012 to 2014, Way appeared as Ser Dontos Hollard on HBO's Game of Thrones. In 2014, he appeared in the sci-fi film Edge of Tomorrow, and made an appearance on Doctor Who. Since 2013 he has played Terry in BBC Radio 4 sitcom Seekers, written by his college friend and collaborator Stephen Burge. Way also still regularly works with Rhys Thomas on the Thomas and Way Podcast, which they have been recording irregularly since 2011.

== Personal life ==
Way was born in Rochford, Essex, grew up in nearby Wickford, and lives in the London Borough of Hackney.

== Filmography ==
=== Film ===
Year	Title	Role	Notes
2000	Cheeky	Rick	
2002	Ali G Indahouse	Dave	
2004	Finding Neverland	Set Mover	
2004	Tunnel of Love	Spiff	
2008	Trimming the Fat	James "Hendy" Henderson	
2009	Beyond the Pole	Landlord	
2009	Down Terrace	Garvey	Winner Fantastic Fest – Best Feature and Best Screenplay & Best British Film at London's Raindance Film Festival
2010	London Boulevard	Lone Pap	
2011	Anonymous	Thomas Nashe	
2011	The Girl with the Dragon Tattoo	Plague	
2012	Sightseers	Crich Tourist	
2013	Gus and His Dirty Dead Dad	Taxi Gavin	
2013	Convenience	Stoner 2	
2014	Legend of the Golden Fishcake	Gavin	
2014	The Riot Club	Mugger	
2014	Edge of Tomorrow	Kimmel	
2015	Brand New-U	Gun Dealer/Santa	
2015	Aaaaaaaah!	Sitcom Lee	
2015	High-Rise	Robert the Caretaker	
2015	Trespass Against Us	Norman	
2016	Mindhorn	Dad with Newspaper	
2019	For Love or Money	Tim	
2024	Here	Ted	
2025	Red Sonja	Dane the Blacksmith	

=== Television ===
Year	Title	Role	Notes
1994	The Fast Show	New Boy	
1998–2001	Eleven O'Clock Show		Writer
1999	Bang, Bang, It's Reeves and Mortimer	Various characters	
1999	Small Potatoes	Elwood	
1999	Spaced	Paper Boy	
2000–2001	Randall and Hopkirk	Hammer of God	
2000–2004	Black Books	Cinema Clerk/Burger Boy	
2000–2011	My Family	Himself	Guest cast
2001–2002	Fun at the Funeral Parlour	Gwynne Thomas	
2003–2004	Hardware	Cliff	
2004	EastEnders	Nick	
2005	Monkey Trousers	Various characters	
2005	Extras	Chef	
2005–2007	Tittybangbang		
2006	Blunder		Writer
2008	Fairy Tales	Rapunzel	
2008	No Heroics	Praying Mantis	
2008	The Wall	Various characters	Writer
2008	Torn Up Tales	Clint "The Beast" Beastwood	
2008–2009	Crash	Various characters	Writer
2009–2011	Shooting Stars	Various characters	Writer
2009–2011	The Impressions Show	Various characters	Writer
2009	2009 Unwrapped with Miranda Hart	Arthur	
2010	Money	Fat Paul	
2010	Mongrels	Gary	
2010	Above Their Stations	Techno Benson	
2011	Life's Too Short		
2012	Sherlock	Prison Warden	
2012; 2014	Game of Thrones	Ser Dontos Hollard	
2013	Fit	Various	
2014	Derek	Pete	
2014	Doctor Who	Alf	
2014	Not Going Out	Tony	
2014	The Life of Rock with Brian Pern	Ned/Captain Cupnutz/Rick Parfitt	
2015	Asylum	Alan	
2015	Pompidou	Merrick	
2015	Drunk History	Various characters	
2015	House of Fools	Punter/Butcher Brother	
2015	Inside No. 9	Michael	
2015	Murder in Successville	Harry Styles	
2015	SunTrap	Glenn	
2015	Jekyll and Hyde	Silas	
2016	Brian Pern: 45 Years of Prog and Roll	Ned	
2016–2017	Zapped	Chestnut	
2017	Philip K. Dick's Electric Dreams	Carmichael	
2017	Tracey Breaks the News	Various characters	
2018	Collateral	Conor	
2018	Silent Witness	Gordon Jarrow	
2019–2022	After Life	Lenny	
2019	Giri/Haji	Roy	
2020	Mandy	Sergei	
2020	Des	Dyno Rod Engineer	
2025	Midsomer Murders	Freddy Westcott	Episode: "Treasures of Darkness"
2026	Alley Cats	Drug dealer cat	Voice role
2026	Eastenders	Nick (Cab driver)	

=== Radio ===
- Seekers (BBC Radio 4) – Terry
- Thomas and Way Podcast
- The Don't Watch With Mother Sketchbook – Various characters, also writer

=== Stage ===
- Richard Sandlings Perfect Movie – Queen's Head, London
- Lenny Beige's Night of Legends – Pigalle Club, London
- Oram and Meeten's Club Fantastico – Lowdown, The Albany, London
- Stay Alive Pepi – Canal Cafe, London
- Stay Alive Pepi – Assembly Rooms, Edinburgh
- Stay Alive Pepi – De Hems, London
