= Brian Pern =

British TV comedy series (2014–2017)

- Also known as: Rock Ratatouille
- Genre: Comedy; Mockumentary
- Created by: Rhys Thomas
- Written by: Rhys Thomas; Simon Day
- Directed by: Rhys Thomas
- Starring: Simon Day; Michael Kitchen; Rhys Thomas; Paul Whitehouse; Lucy Montgomery; Nigel Havers
- Country of origin: United Kingdom
- Original language: English
- No. of series: 3
- No. of episodes: 11 (list of episodes)

Production
- Executive producer: Saurabh Kakkar/Richard Webb
- Producer: Rhys Thomas
- Running time: 30 minutes 40 minutes for "A Tribute"
- Production company: BBC Comedy

Original release
- Network: BBC Four
- Release: 10 February 2014 – 29 March 2017

The Brian Pern mockumentaries are a British comedy spoof-documentary series about a fictional ageing rock star, Brian Pern, the former frontman of the 1970s progressive rock group Thotch. The series is written by Rhys Thomas and Simon Day, and stars Day as Pern, with Michael Kitchen, Paul Whitehouse and Nigel Havers in supporting roles.

Brian Pern, described by Radio Times as "an affectionate parody of Peter Gabriel, with a dash of Brian Eno", originated as a character for a web series. Subsequently transferred to television, the first series, titled The Life of Rock with Brian Pern, was originally broadcast in three weekly parts on BBC Four from 10 February 2014. A second series of three episodes was promoted to BBC Two and broadcast from 9 December 2014, retitled Brian Pern: A Life in Rock. A third series of three episodes, Brian Pern: 45 Years of Prog and Roll, was broadcast on BBC Four from 14 January 2016. A spoof Christmas song ‘Wish I Was At Home With Me Missus' parodies Stop the Cavalry by Jona Lewie and Pipes of Peace by Paul McCartney.

== Cast ==
One of several lineups of Thotch. From left to right: Pat Quid (Paul Whitehouse), Mike Phillips (Philip Pope), Brian Pern (Simon Day), Tony Pebblé (Nigel Havers) and Mike Spelling (Dean Thomas)

=== Main cast ===
- Simon Day as Brian Pern
- Michael Kitchen as John Farrow
- Rhys Thomas as Rhys Thomas OBE (and other characters)
- Paul Whitehouse as Pat Quid (lead guitarist in the band)
- Nigel Havers as Tony Pebblé (keyboards in the band)
- Lucy Montgomery as Pepita Sanchez (and other characters)

=== Recurring cast ===
- Tony Way as Ned Pankhurst
- David Cummings as John
- Philip Pope as Mike Phillips
- Peter Gabriel as himself

=== Guest cast ===
- Vic Reeves as Dermot Mulligan
- Bob Mortimer as Dermot O'Hare
- Matt Lucas as Ray Thomas
- Anna Maxwell Martin as Jess Hunt
- Danny John-Jules as Nigel Rogers (based on Nile Rodgers)
- Kevin Eldon as Lennie Monkton
- Michael Smiley as Micky Murray
- Frances Barber as Wendy Mankiewicz
- Al Murray as Jon Westmore (Series 1) / Eddie Mount: Drummer (Series 2)
- Tom Davis as Russian Wembley Arena Security Guard
- Christopher Eccleston as Luke Dunmore
- Suranne Jones as Astrid Maddox Pern
- John Thomson as Perry Boothe
- Jane Asher as Cindy Pern
- Adam Longworth as Tallow Pern
- Shelley Longworth as Ripple Pern
- Denis Lawson as Barry Patmoor
- Alan Ford as 'Big' Basil Steel
- Simon Callow as Bennet St John
- Craig Christiaens as Brian's Drummer
- Peter Bowles as Mr. Pern
- Angela Thorne as Mrs. Susan Pern

In addition to Peter Gabriel's cameos, the series features a range of musicians playing themselves including Roger Taylor, Phil Collins, Jools Holland, Rick Wakeman, Rick Parfitt, Chrissie Hynde, Tim Rice, Billy Bragg, Roy Wood, Paul Young, Mark King, Noddy Holder, Martin Kemp, Melanie C, Chas Hodges, Dave Peacock and Mike Batt. Vic Reeves and Bob Mortimer reprised their characters of Mulligan and O'Hare from The Smell of Reeves and Mortimer.

The following actors and television or radio personalities have appeared as themselves in guest roles: Roger Moore, David Arnold, David Baddiel, Noel Edmonds, Miranda Sawyer, John Humphrys, Dan Cruickshank, Mike Read, Jack Whitehall, Martin Freeman, Kathy Burke, Alex Jones, Dan Snow, Matthew Wright, Alan Yentob, Paul Gambaccini, Tony Blackburn, Simon McCoy, Annie Nightingale, Dermot O'Leary, Kirsty Young and Ian Wright.

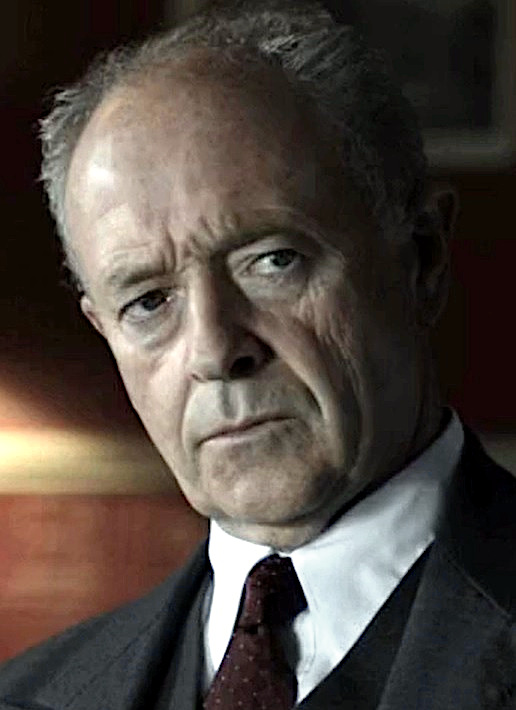
Michael Kitchen (2013)

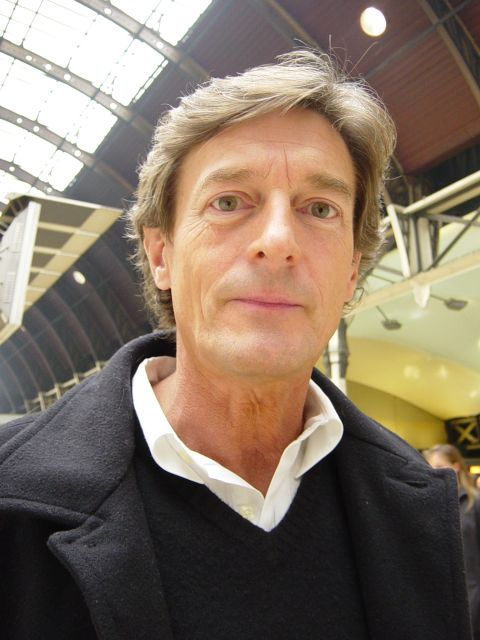
Nigel Havers (2004)

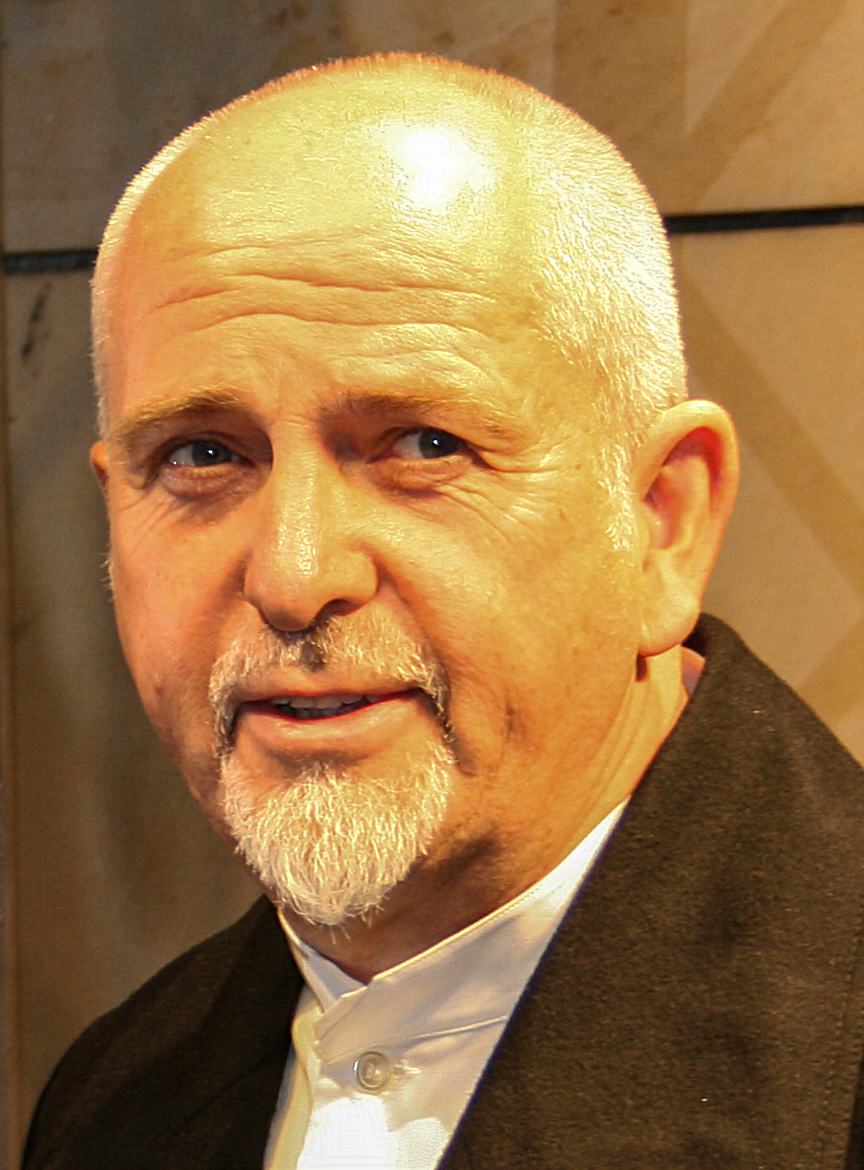
Peter Gabriel (2008)

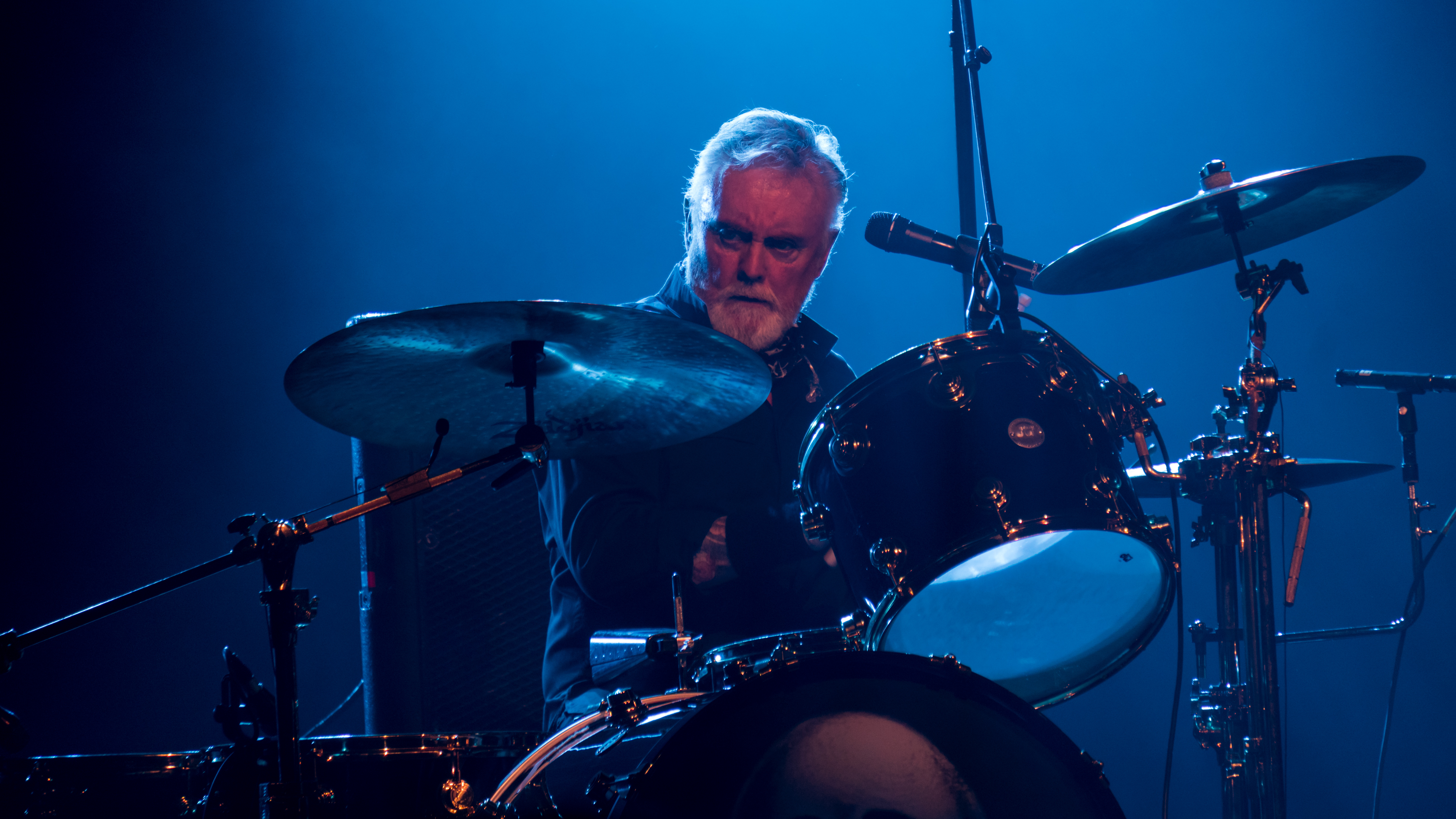
Roger Taylor (2017)

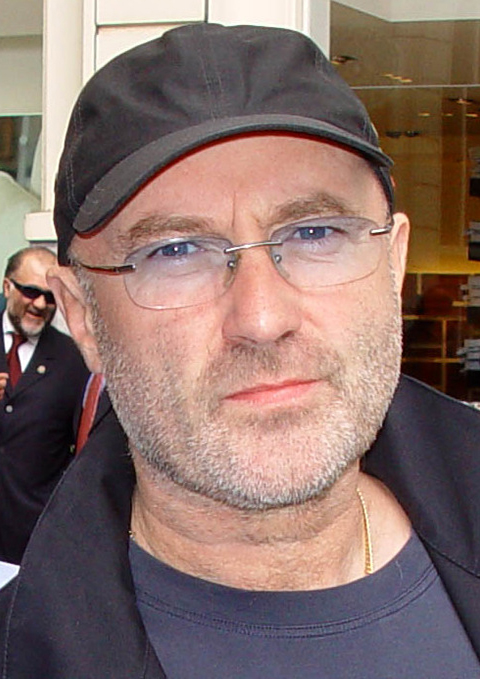
Phil Collins (2007)

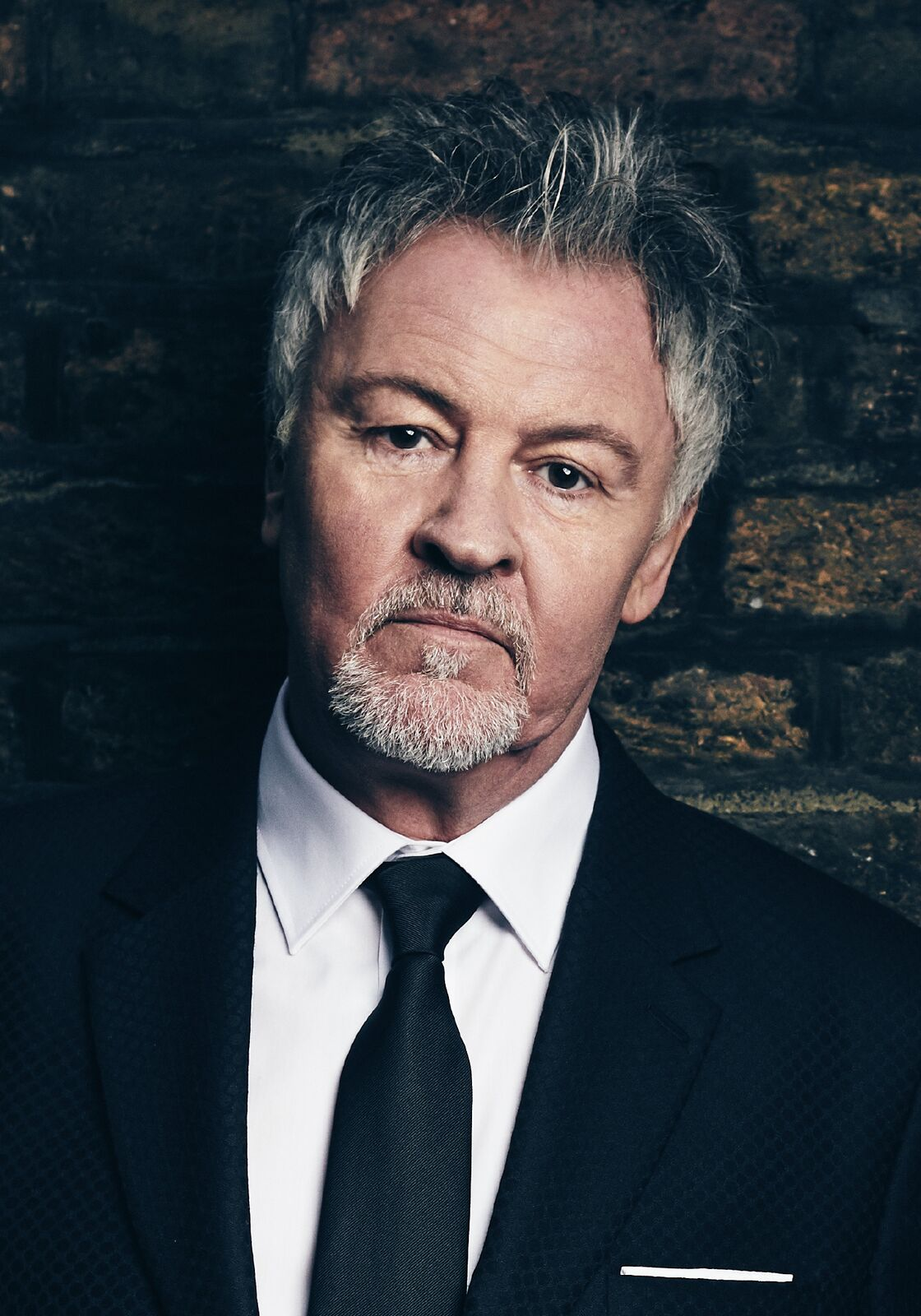
Paul Young (2017)

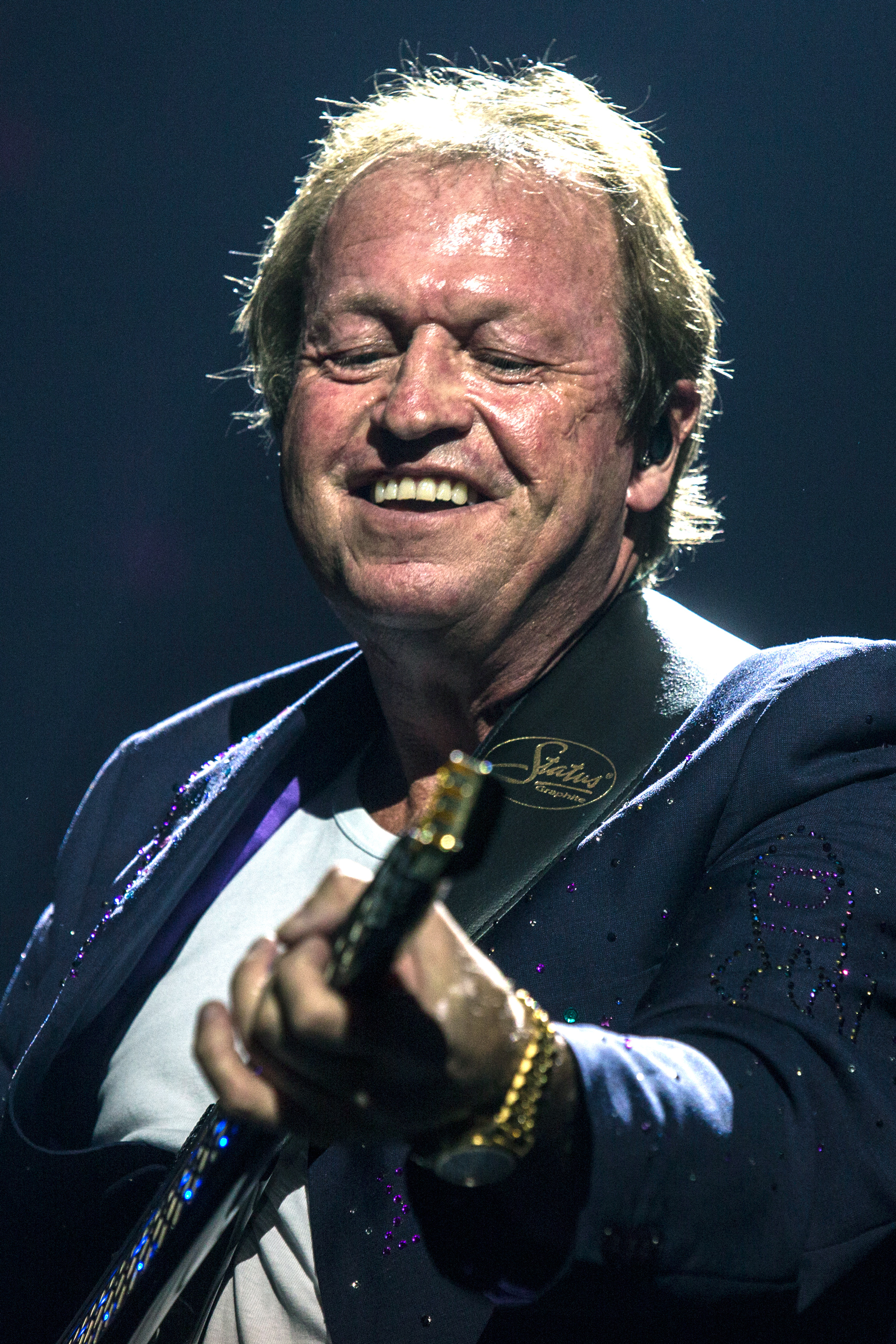
Mark King (2013)

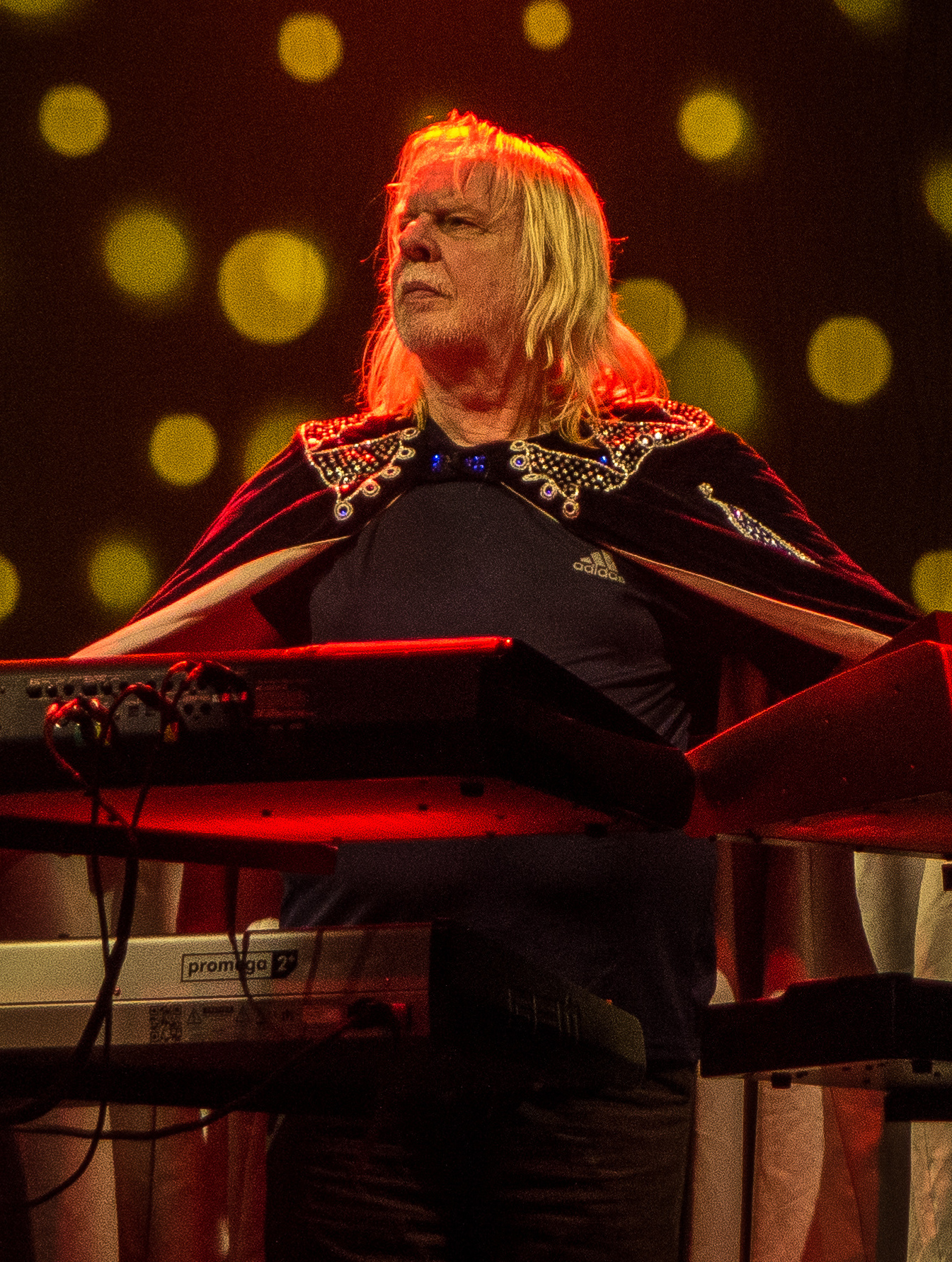
Rick Wakeman (2017)

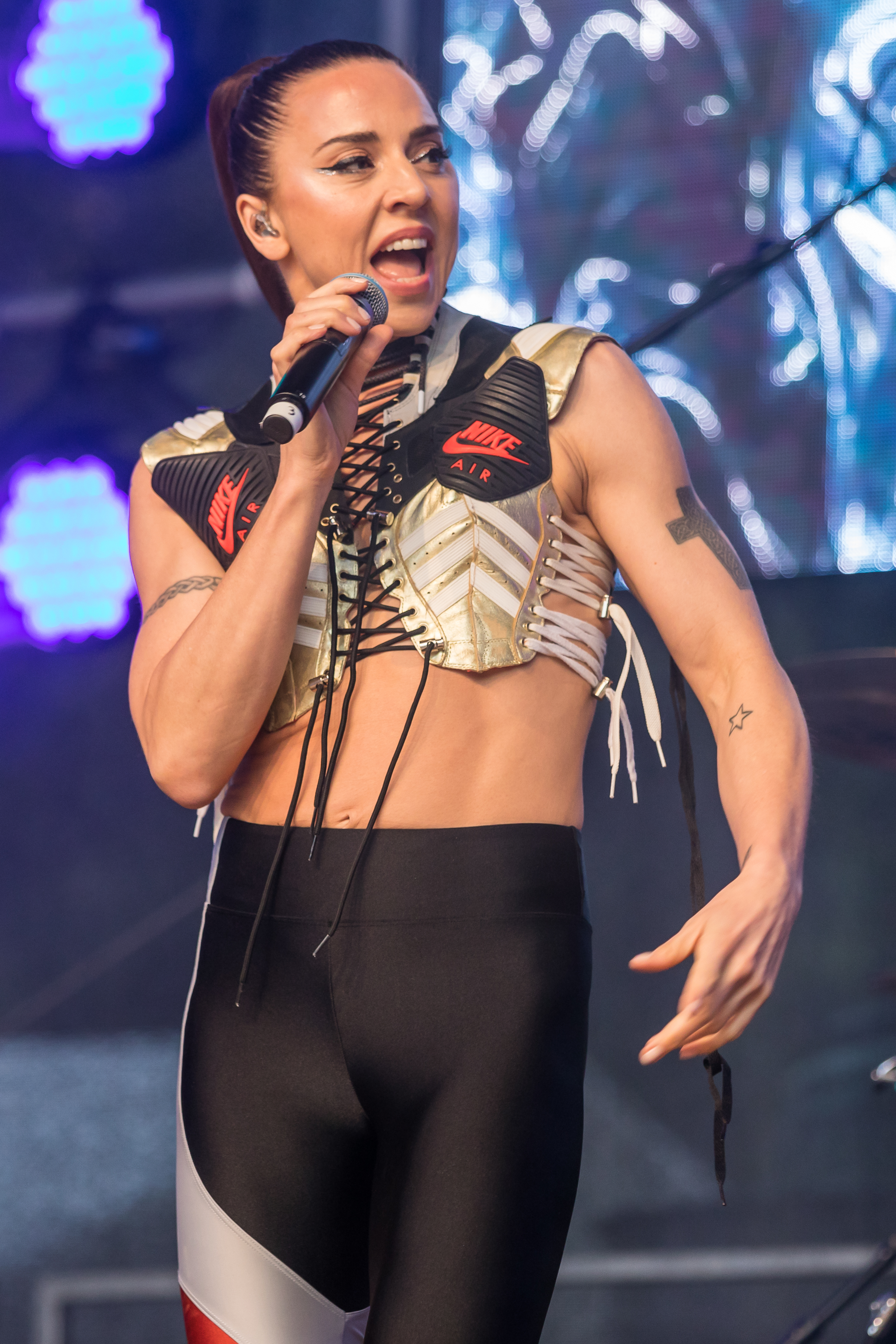
Mel C (2019)

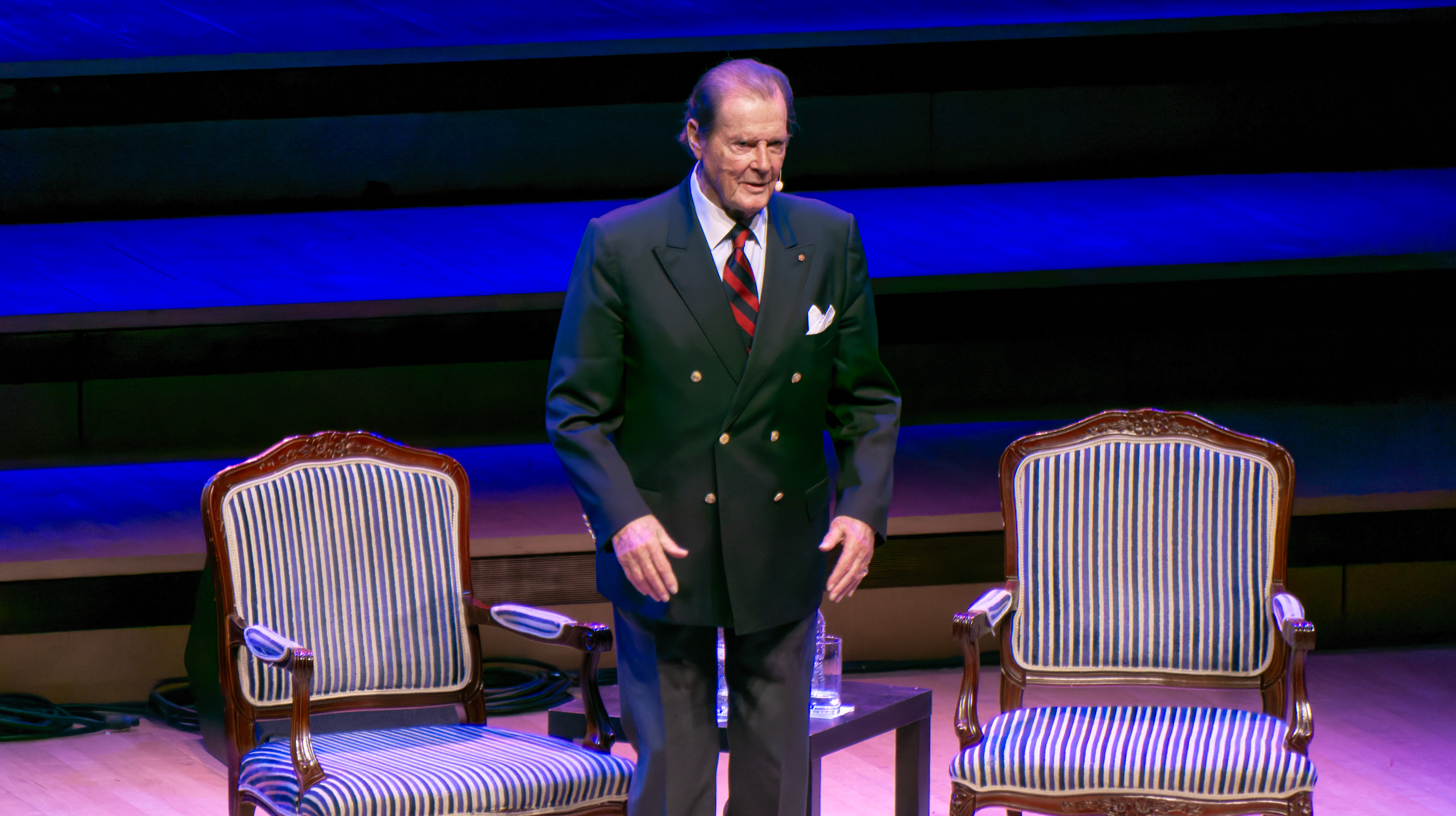
Roger Moore (2016)

== Production ==
The commissioning of the series was announced by Janice Hadlow on 22 August 2013 at the Edinburgh International Television Festival under the name of Rock Ratatouille.

== Origins ==
Comedian Rhys Thomas created the character of Brian Pern in 2008 when he was asked by BBC Comedy commissioner Simon Lupton to come up with an idea for the first batch of Online-Exclusive comedy sketches the BBC Comedy Website was developing. A fan of Peter Gabriel, Thomas was a frequent visitor to Gabriel's website where the singer would post a monthly video blog about his current projects. At this time other rock musicians from the same generation were doing the same, such as Brian May and Brian Eno. In the series, Pern states that he "invented world music" (a reference to WOMAD) and was "the first musician to use Plasticine in videos" (a reference to Gabriel's song "Sledgehammer"). "There is more than one influence in that character," Gabriel told Mark Blake of Q, "but I am definitely one of them. I'm flattered by it."

Once the idea was commissioned, Thomas approached his fellow Fast Show and Down the Line collaborator Simon Day to play Brian Pern. Day was also a fan of Gabriel. Following a successful run on BBC Online, a second batch of sketches were commissioned. With a small increase in budget, extra cast members were brought in: Lucy Montgomery as Majita (who would later become Pepita in the TV series) and Paul Whitehouse as guitarist Pat Quid (Thomas later cited he got the name from Stacy Keach's character in Roadgames). The relationship between Pat and Brian is based on that of David Gilmour and Roger Waters.

Thomas created the part of Brian's manager John Farrow for Michael Kitchen. Thomas had been developing a comedy drama for BBC One with Kitchen and offered him the part in the second series of online specials of Brian Pern. Thomas has stated in various interviews that John Farrow is an exaggerated version of Queen manager Jim Beach, whom Thomas had worked with for many years following his involvement with the band.

== Reception ==
Reviewing the second series, Brian Pern: A Life in Rock, Michael Hogan of The Daily Telegraph believed that "the observational material had bite but lost its cutting edge by forcing itself into a sitcom framework." Andrew Billen of The Times thought that "the first of this three-part returning comedy certainly had its very funny moments, but was it really necessary?" Ellen E. Jones of The Independent considered it to be a "very astute, very funny spoof of fêted rock'n'roll royalty, money grabbing 'creative' projects and BBC arts documentaries in general." Matt Baylis of the Daily Express commented "there's a sense of the BBC laughing at itself so other people don't have to. I'm not sure it should get off that lightly."

== Episode list ==
=== Series 1 - The Life of Rock with Brian Pern ===
No. in series	Title	Directed by	Written by	Original release date
1	"Birth of Rock"	Rhys Thomas	Rhys Thomas and Simon Day	10 February 2014
In this episode, we are introduced to Thotch frontman Brian Pern (Simon Day) as he takes a look at how the genre of rock music was born.
2	"Middle Age of Rock"	Rhys Thomas	Rhys Thomas and Simon Day	17 February 2014
Brian takes a look at protest songs and charity singles including his own, "Succulent Chinese Meal", the most famous charity single of all time, "Doctor in Distress", and the most obscure charity songs like "Snooker Loopy" by Chas & Dave, which isn't a charity single at all. Brian also looks back at 1985's Live Aid concert and reveals how Russia tried, but failed, to put an end to the so-called "Global Jukebox" by almost killing Phil Collins as he travelled to the US leg of the concert via Concorde.
3	"Death of Rock"	Rhys Thomas	Rhys Thomas and Simon Day	24 February 2014
Brian looks at how aging rock bands reform after not performing for many years.

=== Series 2 - Brian Pern: A Life in Rock ===
No. in series	Title	Directed by	Written by	Original release date
1	"Jukebox Musical"	Rhys Thomas	Rhys Thomas and Simon Day	9 December 2014
We join progressive rock band Thotch as they stage their own jukebox musical produced by Cameron Mackintosh and directed by comedienne Kathy Burke. Unfortunately things don't go to plan as Burke decides to drop all the songs as they were all too long and lead singer Brian Pern is wrongfully arrested under a police operation called Operation Bad Apples.
2	"The Day of the Triffids"	Rhys Thomas	Rhys Thomas and Simon Day	16 December 2014
Brian decides to perform his unreleased rock opera The Day of the Triffids, based on the book of the same name, at the peak of Mount Kilimanjaro with a warm-up show at Wembley Arena scheduled for Friday 6 June 2014 with former James Bond actor Sir Roger Moore as the narrator. Unfortunately, things take a snag when manager John Farrow (Michael Kitchen) informs Brian that Moore is stuck in New Zealand filming and cannot make it to the Wembley show but has agreed to fufil his role in his hotel room via Skype. After Brian appears on an episode of The Wright Stuff, he is accidentally racist about clothing store Blacks during a conversation with Farrow. He later effectively apologizes during a guest appearance on The One Show. At the show, during the drum solo on the song "Triffid Crackdown", Brian is busy running to the middle of the Wembley Arena floor when he is met by a Russian security guard (Tom Davis) who doesn't let him back in the auditorium until he shows him his bottom so 1980s stars Mark King and Paul Young go on stage instead.
3	"Bi-Polar Polar Bear Aid"	Rhys Thomas	Rhys Thomas and Simon Day	22 December 2014
Brian decides to release an album of Christmas songs to raise funds for bi-polar polar bears. Brian enlists the help of musicians such as Status Quo's Rick Parfitt and Melanie C. After the album is complete, Brian suffers a heart attack and is taken to hospital where in an interview with documentary maker Rhys Thomas OBE (Rhys Thomas), he announces his retirement from the music industry.

=== Series 3 - Brian Pern: 45 Years of Prog and Roll ===
No. in series	Title	Directed by	Written by	Original release date
1	"Festivals and Fans"	Rhys Thomas	Rhys Thomas and Simon Day	14 January 2016
We join Brian as he prepares to celebrate his 45th year in music by performing at the 2015 Isle of Wight Festival and at the 2015 V Festival in Manchester. But when Brian, new wife Astrid (Suranne Jones) and Thotch fan club president Perry Boothe (John Thomson) are making their way to the V Festival, the train suddenly stops as a herd of cows had strayed onto the track. Eventually, Brian does perform at the V Festival.
2	"Breaking America"	Rhys Thomas	Rhys Thomas and Simon Day	21 January 2016
We look back Thotch's unsuccessful attempt to break America: following lead singer Brian Pern's departure from the group in 1977, the band were forced to hire US singer and "cokehead" Lindsey Simon, whose bottom and nose famously fell out during two of the band's concerts. While this is going on, Brian is celebrating his induction into the Rock and Roll Hall of Fame. Brian decides not to attend the ceremony because of the backlash that his children, Tallow (Adam Longworth) and Ripple (Shelley Longworth), receive after their purely instrumental song is played on the radio by Zane Lowe: Brian sends Spandau Ballet bassist Martin Kemp to the ceremony in Los Angeles instead. We also see Brian influence 1990s indie music by releasing an album called "Get Real Quick" which included the songs "Maraca Man" and "Poundland Polly".
3	"The Thotch Reunion"	Rhys Thomas	Rhys Thomas and Simon Day	28 January 2016
We join Thotch as they announce they are going to reform for a Wembley Arena concert scheduled for Saturday, 10 December 2015. Brian only agrees to do the concert when manager John Farrow informs him that guitarist Pat Quid has been diagnosed with dementia. Brian then releases his autobiography and gets actor Martin Freeman to narrate the audio version of it just because he "sounds like Martin Freeman". We later learn that there was a sixth original Thotch member called Bennet St John (Simon Callow). The band eventually do the concert but during the performance of "Rock this Nation", St John appears on stage followed by a security guard and is yanked off.

=== A Tribute - At the BBC ===
No. in series	Title	Directed by	Written by	Original release date
1	"A Tribute"	Rhys Thomas	Rhys Thomas additional material Simon Day	29 March 2017
A hastily-assembled tribute following Brian Pern's death in a Segway mistake.
2	"At the BBC"	Rhys Thomas	Rhys Thomas additional material Simon Day	29 March 2017
A further tribute to Brian Pern featuring some of the musician's greatest Top of the Pops performances.
