= Rhys Thomas (comedian) =

British actor and comedian (born 1978)

- Born: 12 December 1978 (age 47); Basildon, Essex, England
- Occupations: Actor, comedian, director, producer
- Years active: 1996–present
- Spouse: Lucy Montgomery
- Children: 2

Rhys Thomas (born 12 December 1978) is a British director, producer, actor, comedian, and writer. Thomas created the CBBC series Dodger, a prequel to Oliver Twist. He has also appeared in Star Stories, The Fast Show, Sirens and Bellamy's People. Thomas produced and directed the feature-length documentary Freddie Mercury: The Great Pretender and subsequently won Best Arts Documentary in both the 2013 Rose D'Or and International Emmy Awards. He co-wrote, produced, directed and co-starred in the spoof music documentary series The Life of Rock with Brian Pern on BBC Four and BBC Two.

== Early life ==
Thomas, who has a Welsh father and English mother, grew up in Wickford, Essex. While in the sixth form at Beauchamps High School in Wickford, Thomas made comedy videos with friends, forming a comedy group called Stay Alive Pepi with Stephen Burge, Tony Way and Glynne Wiley. Thomas began his TV career when he phoned the production company for Shooting Stars to ask for studio audience tickets. When they told him that they did not have any he asked if he could be given work experience. They happened to need a runner and employed him, sometimes filling in for George Dawes on the drums during rehearsals for the show. His breakthrough came when he showed Charlie Higson and Bob Mortimer some of his comedy tapes and Higson recruited Thomas as a supporting cast member on The Fast Show, in which he made recurring appearances, notably as Paul, the young assistant to the Charlie Higson character, oily used-car-dealer "Swiss Toni". He became script editor on Shooting Stars in a later series.

== Career ==
In addition to his work on The Fast Show, in 1997 Thomas made a BBC Two pilot with Ulrika Jonsson called It's Ulrika written by Vic Reeves and Bob Mortimer. In 1998 he starred in Shooting Stars and The Fast Show Live at the Hammersmith Apollo, the sketch show Barking for Channel 4 alongside Mackenzie Crook, Catherine Tate, Peter Kay and David Walliams and appeared at the Edinburgh Fringe Festival with Stay Alive Pepi. He also appeared in Sir Bernard Chumley's Stately Homes and the pilot show Crazy Jonathan's with Matt Lucas and David Walliams. In 1999 he worked as a team writer on series one of The 11 O'Clock Show and was a radio presenter on the XFM breakfast show with Natasha Desborough.

At the age of 20, Thomas wrote a pilot script for Fun at the Funeral Parlour. The producer Simon Lupton was impressed, and submitted it to Stuart Murphy, the then controller of BBC Choice, and a series was filmed in summer 2000 and a second series 2001. Guest stars included Tom Baker, Paul Whitehouse, Charlie Higson, Bill Oddie, Christopher Cazenove, Phil Cornwell, Mitchell and Webb, Lucas and Walliams, Simon Day, Mark Williams, Anita Dobson, Art Malik and Dudley Sutton. Music was specially composed by Brian May of Queen.

Thomas has appeared in several other comedy series including Happiness, Monkey Trousers, Nathan Barley, the Channel 4 comedy Star Stories playing Jude Law, Andrew Ridgeley, Warren Beatty, Gary Glitter, Daniel Day-Lewis, Kiefer Sutherland and The Fonz amongst others. He wrote for and appears in the Channel 4 sketch show Blunder.

In 2002–2004, he co-wrote and starred in two series of Swiss Toni, writing four episodes and co-writing others. He also toured with The Fast Show for its farewell tour in 2002. He subsequently appeared on several panel shows and talking head programmes including Fanorama with David Mitchell (2001/2), Does Doug Know with Daisy Donovan on Channel 4 (2002), Law of the Playground (2006), Comedian's Comedian (2005), Nathan Barley (2005), 8 Out of 10 Cats (2006), FAQ U (2005), Charlie Brooker's Screenwipe (2006), Tittybangbang (2005) and Rob Brydon's Annually Retentive (2007).

From 2006 to 2013, Thomas played the host of BBC Radio 4's spoof late-night phone-in, Down the Line. The programme was the 2007 winner of the Broadcasting Press Guild Radio Programme of the Year Award and in 2008 it received the Sony Gold Award for Best Radio Comedy. In January 2010 Down the Line was adapted into a television format called Bellamy's People starring and co-written by Thomas as Gary Bellamy. It was launched and gained a positive critical reception with The Radio Times praising Thomas for his straight man role and the ability to make those around him seem even funnier.

In 2012, Thomas wrote a draft of the Freddie Mercury/Queen biopic which was due to star Sacha Baron Cohen as Freddie Mercury. When the project stalled, he turned his script and many elements into his Emmy AwardIn 2012, Thomas wrote a draft of the Freddie Mercury / Queen biopic which was due to star Sacha Baron Cohen as Freddie Mercury. When the project stalled, he turned his script and many elements into his Emmy Award-winning documentary The Great Pretender, released in September. On 31 December 2010, Thomas appeared on and won Celebrity Mastermind with a specialist subject record score of 21 points and a total 36 points. His specialist subject was Queen.

Thomas has worked closely with the rock band Queen, of whom he is a major fan, producing seven of their DVDs: Greatest Video Hits 1 (2002), Queen Live at Wembley (2003), Greatest Video Hits 2 (2003), Jewels (2004), Queen on Fire – Live at the Bowl (2004), Queen + Paul Rodgers: Return of the Champions and A Night at the Opera - 30th Anniversary, making documentaries and directing new videos, including I Was Born to Love You. In 2003, he wrote, starred and co-directed (with Simon Lupton) a commercial for Queen Greatest Video Hits 2 also starring Roger Taylor and Brian May. In July 2010, Thomas was asked by Jim Beach, manager of Queen to write the sleeve notes for all 15 studio albums by the band, due for re-release in 2011 to coincide with the band's 40th. He also produced the two-part Queen documentary Days of Our Lives, which was broadcast on BBC2 in May 2011.

In 2009, Thomas appeared in a mockumentary film Beyond the Pole starring with Stephen Mangan, Helen Baxendale and Mark Benton. The film was premiered at the Prince Charles Cinema as part of the London Film Festival on 5 December 2009, and was released nationwide in February 2010.

In April 2009, Thomas appeared in BBC switch's show, Winging It, playing the character of a music mogul, and wrote and starred in Above Their Stations, a sitcom pilot about Police Community Support Officers for BBC Three, also starring Simon Day, Dudley Sutton and Denis Lawson. He also created, co-wrote and co-produced Brian Pern, a series of online spoof blogs starring Simon Day as Brian Pern, an ageing progressive rock musician based on Peter Gabriel, Brian Eno and other intelligent, politically active rock artists of that ilk. In 2014, The Life of Rock with Brian Pern was broadcast on BBC Four, a series directed, produced and co-written by Thomas. A second series was broadcast on BBC Two, and a third series was broadcast on BBC Four in early 2016. A final one-off special aired in spring 2017. The series were memorable for the number of cameos and guest appearances by real life musicians, actors and personalities who appeared.

He was the lead in the Channel 4 comedy-drama Sirens, first broadcast in June 2011.

In November 2013, Thomas appeared in the one-off 50th anniversary comedy homage The Five(ish) Doctors Reboot.

From 2016 to 2020, Thomas wrote and directed an annual comedy review show on BBC Four A Year in the Life of a Year reviewing the happenings of the previous year.

In 2019 Thomas and Lucy Montgomery wrote and starred in the BBC One comedy special BUMPS with Amanda Redman, Clarke Peters and Lisa McGrillis. The show followed a 62 year old woman (Redman) who decides to have a baby with a donor. The series was indefinitely postponed due to COVID-19.

The TV series Dodger is a prequel to Oliver Twist and first aired on BBC One on 13 March 2022. Thomas directed all ten episodes, acted as showrunner and co wrote the series with his wife Lucy Montgomery. The programme won a BAFTA and RTS Award for Best Scripted Children's Programme in 2022.

Thomas wrote and directed the 2020 mockumentary The Kemps: All True, starring Martin and Gary Kemp as themselves, and the sequel,The Kemps: All Gold in December 2023.

== Personal life ==
Thomas is married to actress Lucy Montgomery. He is a member of the British show business charitable organisation the Grand Order of Water Rats.
