= Law of the Playground =

Media franchise

Law of the Playground is the name of a website, book and television series that features members of the public's memories about school life. It styles itself "The least coherent encyclopaedia of playground insults on the internet".

== Website ==
Set up in 1999, the site was founded by TVGoHome regular Jonathan Blyth, aka Log. Originally a part of www.disappointment.com, it grew until it warranted its own website. The website describes its inception thus;

"The Law of the Playground was inspired in 1983 by an educationally fucked child called Adam Mason, who ran around the playground claiming to be "Cha-Man". He used to say "chaaaaa", all playtime, every playtime. This boy has remained at the forefront of one classmate's mind ever since. In 1999, a totem to this monument of cheerful spackery was built. And then, it grew."

The site allows people to post schoolyard stories, insults and urban legends related to their time at school. Stories can be submitted by anyone, but have to be vetted by the website administrators. By their own admission, standards of judging submissions are ill-defined and random. The only criterion that seems to be followed regularly is that the entry must be funny, with a "spark of ingenuity, oddness, or darkness".

The site ceased to be updated in October 2008. In October 2011, the website relocated to lawoftheplayground.com; as of 2018 this domain name was dormant; however it has since relocated to www.lawoftheplayground.net, where it serves purely as a read-only archive site. An announcement in May 2015 that the site would return in a new format, and with an accompanying YouTube channel, has not to date come to fruitition.

== Book ==
In April 2004, a book was released which compiled many of the entries on the website. Rather than using the exact wording of the user-submitted entries however, most were edited by Jonathan Blyth.

== TV series ==
In July 2006, the website made the leap onto mainstream television with a show commissioned by Channel 4. A different format to the website was followed, with celebrities including Vic Reeves, David Mitchell, Alan Carr, Lee Mack, Justin Lee Collins and Josie D'Arby invited to share humorous stories about various aspects of their school lives.

A second series, comprising six 24-minute episodes, began broadcast on Channel 4 on 1 February 2008. It features a whole host of new famous faces reminiscing, as well as many from the first series.
