= Mortimer & Whitehouse: Gone Fishing =

British television show

- Genre: Factual entertainment
- Starring: Bob Mortimer; Paul Whitehouse; Ted (2021-2026)
- Opening theme: (Series 1 - 3) Mad Lad (Chuck Berry)
- Country of origin: United Kingdom
- Original language: English
- No. of series: 8 (+ 5 Specials)
- No. of episodes: 56

Production
- Executive producers: Lisa Clark; David Brindley (BBC)
- Producer: Nicky Waltam
- Running time: 30 minutes
- Production company: Owl Power TV

Original release
- Network: BBC Two
- Release: 20 June 2018 – present

Mortimer & Whitehouse: Gone Fishing is a factual entertainment television show featuring comedian friends Bob Mortimer and Paul Whitehouse. The show features Mortimer and Whitehouse reflecting on life after their shared major heart problems, while on fishing trips to various locations around Britain. The series was first broadcast on BBC Two on 20 June 2018 and has been recommissioned every year since. An hour-long Christmas special was added from 2020 onwards. Series 7 was expanded to 8 episodes. In season 3, Ted the Patterdale Terrier was introduced in the show, and has been featured in most episodes since. Ted died in April 2026, before his final appearance in series 9 was aired. Series 9 premiered on 25 October 2026.

== Background ==
In 2015, Mortimer underwent emergency triple heart bypass surgery. Whitehouse had also had heart problems that were only detected at the last minute. Whitehouse was talking to Mortimer's wife, Lisa about Mortimer's recovery from the operation; on learning that Mortimer was no longer going out much, Whitehouse invited him to go fishing. Mortimer enjoyed it, later saying "I've never felt anything like it." "There comes a moment when you realise that you've said nothing for an hour and a half. I haven't thought about anything else. I haven't worried about the past, or future." Mortimer did not know until much later that Whitehouse had spoken to his wife.

After the fishing trips led to Mortimer resuming normal social activities, Whitehouse had the idea for the show. He thought there might be the chance to make a humorous and informative programme that was beyond "two old blokes going fishing". Whitehouse described the pitch for the show as combining the real-life jeopardy of their medical conditions, two old friends who had had a reprieve, and the timeless wonder of the English countryside.

== Episodes ==
Series	Episodes	Originally released		Ave. UK viewers (millions)
Series	Episodes	First released	Last released	Ave. UK viewers (millions)
1	6	20 June 2018	25 July 2018	1.5
2	6	2 August 2019	6 September 2019	2.14
3	7	23 August 2020	13 December 2020	1.96
4	7	29 August 2021	26 December 2021	2.31
5	7	9 September 2022	24 December 2022	TBA
6	7	3 September 2023	29 December 2023	TBA
7	9	22 September 2024	24 December 2024	TBA
8	7	26 October 2025	24 December 2025	TBA
9	6	25 October 2026	29 November 2026	TBA

Note: Averages exclude Christmas episodes.

=== Series 1 (2018) ===
No.	Title	Fish / Location	Original release date	UK viewers (millions)
1	"Episode 1"	Tench / Norfolk Lakes	20 June 2018	2.14
2	"Episode 2"	Barbel / Middle Wye, Hay-on-Wye, Herefordshire	27 June 2018	1.34
3	"Episode 3"	Wild rainbow trout / Monsal Valley, Derbyshire Wye (Peak District)	4 July 2018	1.37
4	"Episode 4"	Roach / River Wensum, Norfolk	11 July 2018	1.32
5	"Episode 5"	Sea trout and sea bass/ Hampshire Avon, Christchurch, Dorset and The Needles, Isle of Wight	18 July 2018	1.38
6	"Episode 6"	Pike / River Test, Hampshire	25 July 2018	1.45

=== Series 2 (2019) ===
No.	Title	Fish / Location	Original release date	UK viewers (millions)
7	"Episode 1"	Wild brown trout / River Usk, South Wales	2 August 2019	2.09
8	"Episode 2"	Carp / Bentley Lake, Essex	9 August 2019	2.13
9	"Episode 3"	Salmon / River Tay, Scotland	16 August 2019	2.21
10	"Episode 4"	Perch, dogfish, sea bass / Upper Tamar Lake, Devon and Cornwall, and sea fishing	23 August 2019	2.14
11	"Episode 5"	Pike / Upper Lough Erne, County Fermanagh, Northern Ireland	30 August 2019	2.14
12	"Episode 6"	Grayling / River Ure, Yorkshire Dales	6 September 2019	2.13

Note: In Episode 6, Mortimer introduces Whitehouse to Dr. Christopher Young, the surgeon who performed Mortimer's life-saving heart surgery.

=== Series 3 (2020) ===
No.	Title	Fish / Location	Original release date	UK viewers (millions)
13	"Episode 1"	Salmon / River Tweed, Scotland	23 August 2020	2.17
14	"Episode 2"	Chub, dace / River Lea, Hertfordshire	30 August 2020	1.90
15	"Episode 3"	Pike / Broadland, Norfolk Lakes	6 September 2020	1.89
16	"Episode 4"	Brown trout / River Test, Hampshire	13 September 2020	1.93
17	"Episode 5"	Fishing for crucian carp, catching tench / Great Somerford Lakes, Wiltshire	20 September 2020	1.98
18	"Episode 6"	Chub, barbel / Middle Wye, Herefordshire	27 September 2020	1.86
Christmas
19	"Gone Christmas Fishing"	Sea trout, pouting, cod, trout, grayling / River Esk & River Tees, North Yorkshire, and North Sea	13 December 2020	3.20

Notes: Episode 3 was the debut of Ted the Patterdale Terrier dog. Ted is owned by the show's producer, Lisa Clark.

The Christmas episode had a one hour running time, instead of the usual 30 minutes. The pair were joined by musician Chris Rea.

=== Series 4 (2021) ===
No.	Title	Fish / Location	Original release date	UK viewers (millions) 7 day	UK viewers (millions) 28 day
20	"Episode 1"	Sea trout / North Uist island, Outer Hebrides, Scotland	29 August 2021	2.33	2.52
21	"Episode 2"	Fishing for bream, catching tench and pike / Burghley House, Cambridgeshire	5 September 2021	2.00	2.31
22	"Episode 3"	Perch, brown trout and pike / Derwent Water & Watendlath in the Lake District, Cumbria	12 September 2021	1.97	2.23
23	"Episode 4"	Rudd, bream, ruffe, rudd-bream hybrid / Norfolk Broads	19 September 2021	1.93	2.18
24	"Episode 5"	Wild carp, minnow / Powys, Mid Wales, including River Wye	26 September 2021	1.87	2.16
25	"Episode 6"	Zander, rudd / River Severn, Worcestershire	3 October 2021	2.21	2.47
Christmas
26	"Gone Christmas Fishing 2021"	English salmon, trout / Northern England: River Eden, Cumbria / Westmorland and River Tyne, Northumberland	26 December 2021	2.56	TBA

Note: The Christmas episode had a one hour running time, instead of the usual 30 minutes. The pair are joined by footballer Paul Gascoigne, and musical act Paul Heaton and Jacqui Abbott. Mortimer catches his first salmon.

=== Series 5 (2022) ===
No.	Title	Fish / Location	Original release date	UK viewers (millions)
27	"Episode 1"	Grilse, eel while shore fishing / River Exe, Devon & Bossington Beach, Somerset	9 September 2022	1.88
28	"Episode 2"	Grayling, dace / River Dee & Llangollen Canal, North Wales	16 September 2022	N/A
29	"Episode 3"	Fishing for ferox trout, catching wild brown trout / Loch Garry & River Garry, Perthshire, and Loch Ness, Scottish Highlands	23 September 2022	N/A
30	"Episode 4"	Perch / River Thames, Berkshire	30 September 2022	N/A
31	"Episode 5"	Carp and barbel / Reigate Hills, Surrey	7 October 2022	N/A
32	"Episode 6"	Brown trout, bream / Lough Corrib & Ballyquirke Lough, County Galway, Ireland	14 October 2022	N/A
Christmas
33	"Gone Christmas Fishing 2022"	Cod, halibut / Vesterålen & Lofoten islands, Norway	24 December 2022	>4.00

Note: The Christmas episode had a one hour running time, instead of the usual 30 minutes. It was also the first episode not filmed in the UK or Ireland

=== Series 6 (2023) ===
No.	Title	Fish / Location	Original release date	UK viewers (millions)
34	"Episode 1"	Chub, brown trout / River Wye, Wales	3 September 2023	N/A
35	"Episode 2"	Pike / Dumfries and Galloway, Scotland	10 September 2023	N/A
36	"Episode 3"	Dace, roach, river carp / Longford Estate, Hampshire Avon	17 September 2023	N/A
37	"Episode 4"	Crucian carp / Sutton Lake, Shropshire	24 September 2023	N/A
38	"Episode 5"	Wrasse / Burgh Island, Devon	1 October 2023	N/A
39	"Episode 6"	Chub, brown trout, rainbow trout / Haddon Hall; River Wye, Derbyshire, Derwent; Peak District	8 October 2023	N/A
New Year
40	"Gone Hogmanay Fishing"	Salmon / River Dee; grayling / River Tay; and salmon / River Ericht	29 December 2023	N/A

Note: Before filming of episode 5, Mortimer fell ill and missed the episode. Lee Mack deputised for him.

On the hour long Scottish New Year episode the pair were joined by actress Arabella Weir and singer Clare Grogan.

=== Series 7 (2024) ===
No.	Title	Fish / Location	Original release date	UK viewers (millions)
41	"Rocklands Mere, Norfolk – Tench"	Tench / Rocklands Mere, Norfolk	22 September 2024	N/A
42	"The North of Ireland – Salmon"	Salmon / The North of Ireland	29 September 2024	N/A
43	"Driffield Beck, East Yorkshire – Brown Trout"	Brown trout / Driffield Beck, East Riding of Yorkshire	6 October 2024	N/A
44	"River Trent, Nottinghamshire - Barbel"	Barbel / River Trent, Nottinghamshire	13 October 2024	N/A
45	"Blakeney Point - Bass and Sea Trout"	Bass and sea trout / Blakeney Point, Norfolk	20 October 2024	N/A
46	"River Ouse - Perch"	Perch / River Ouse, Bedfordshire	27 October 2024	N/A
47	"Thornwood Springs, Essex - Rudd"	Rudd / Thornwood Springs, Essex	3 November 2024	N/A
48	"River Frome, Dorset - Grayling"	Grayling / River Frome, Dorset	10 November 2024	N/A
Christmas
49	"Gone Christmas Fishing 2024"	Black bass, vandoise and grass carp / River Lot	24 December 2024	N/A

=== Series 8 (2025) ===
All episodes were released on iPlayer on the premiere date.

No.	Title	Fish / Location	Original release date	UK viewers (millions)
50	"River Itchen, Hampshire - Wild Brown Trout"	Wild brown trout / River Itchen, Hampshire	26 October 2025	N/A
51	"Rivers Towi and Cothi, Carmarthenshire - Sea Trout"	Sea trout / River Towi & River Cothi	2 November 2025	N/A
52	"Rochdale Canal, Manchester and River Dane, Cheshire"	Perch / Rochdale Canal & Grayling / River Dane	9 November 2025	N/A
53	"Birley Lake and River Wye, Herefordshire - Perch"	Perch / Birley Lake and perch / River Wye	16 November 2025	N/A
54	"Ceredigion - Carp and Tope"	Carp and tope / Ceredigion	23 November 2025	N/A
55	"River Findhorn, Scottish Highlands - Salmon"	Salmon / River Findhorn	30 November 2025	N/A
Christmas
56	"Gone Christmas Fishing 2025"	Greyling & Sea Trout / River Lyd and Brown trout / River Camel	24 December 2025	N/A
Mortimer & Whitehouse also go Mackerel fishing off the Cornish coast. Dawn French and Paul Ainsworth make guest appearances in this episode.

=== Series 9 (2026) ===
All episodes will be released on iPlayer on the premiere date.

No.	Title	Fish / Location	Original release date	UK viewers (millions)
57	"River Ribble, Lancashire - Barbel"	Barbel / River Ribble, Lancashire	25 October 2026	TBD
58	"Breckland Lakes, Norfolk - Bream"	Bream / Breckland Lakes & Norfolk	1 November 2026	TBD
59	"Shetland - Trout and Pollock"	Trout / Pollock / Shetland	8 November 2026	TBD
60	"River Tees, County Durham - Trout"	Trout / River Tees / County Durham	15 November 2026	TBD
61	"Baronscourt Estate, County Tyrone - Pike"	Pike / Baronscourt Estate / County Tyrone	22 November 2026	TBD
62	"Beaulieu River, Hampshire - Mullet"	Mullet / Beaulieu River / Hampshire	29 November 2026	TBD

Note: This is the last series to feature Ted, before the Patterdale Terrier's death in April 2026.

== Reception ==
The series has received widespread praise for its warmth, charm, gentle nature and poignancy. Sam Wollaston in The Guardian praised it for its genuine reality and described it as "lovely: warm and funny and human and healthy." In The Herald, Alison Rowat described it as "Soothing, funny and poignant", going on to say that it is essential viewing "in a 'break glass in case of emergency' kind of way". Guy Pewsy in the Evening Standard wrote that the show had a "sense of real affection and solidarity", partly down to Mortimer and Whitehouse's shared sense of humour and affectionate rapport. Summing up he called it "a warm and thoroughly pleasant half an hour". i reviewer Elisa Bray, praised the show's "natural" feel and said that it was "A breath of fresh air", calling it "one of the most therapeutic and relaxing on television."

In a five-star review of the second series in The Guardian, Jack Seale praised Mortimer and Whitehouse's comedic chemistry and the series' production values ("It’s just a couple of blokes dicking about but it's filmed in glistening, often airborne HD"), and concluded that "Gone Fishing is a reminder that there's nothing better to spend your money on than friends, memories and moments of throwaway pleasure."

In a review of the first episode of series three, The Independent's Ed Cumming commented on the show's continued and perhaps unexpected popularity, stating that "it’s hard to explain the curious alchemy of Gone Fishing, which is rarely laugh-out-loud funny but has a soothing, unforced pace that draws you in. The production helps, using plenty of drone shots to show the country’s rivers in stately majesty, but the programme relies on the performances of its leads, two of our most gifted comic performers".

A tie-in book for the series, Mortimer & Whitehouse: Gone Fishing: Life, Death and the Thrill of the Catch, was published by Bonnier Books in 2019. An audiobook version, read by Mortimer and Whitehouse, described by The Guardian as "one of the best audio books of 2019," followed.
