= Donna Ewin =

British model

- Born: Donna Clarissa Ground; 4 June 1970 (age 56); Poplar, London, England
- Other name: Nina Downe
- Occupations: Glamour model; actress
- Modeling information
- Height: 5 ft 9 in (1.75 m)
- Hair color: Dark brown
- Eye color: Brown

Donna Clarissa Ground (born 4 June 1970) known professionally as Donna Ewin, is an English former glamour model and actress.

== Career ==
Donna Clarissa Ground was born on 4 June 1970, in Poplar, East London, England. Ewin was her mother's maiden name. Upon leaving college she joined the Yvonne Paul Management agency and first appeared on Page 3 of British newspaper The Sun at the age of 17.

Ewin appeared in many adult magazines including Mayfair and Playboy (sometimes using the pseudonym Nina Downe – an anagram of Donna Ewin); and it was erroneously rumoured that she appeared as an extra in the orgy scene in Stanley Kubrick's last film, Eyes Wide Shut (1999). She did appear regularly on the BBC sketch comedy television show The Fast Show as well as the touring live stage version of the show, notably in the "Mr. and Mrs. Shag" sketch.

== Filmography ==
- The Fast Show (TV series, 1996–2000)
- The Best of British Babefest 2 (1997)
- The Fast Show Live (1998)
- Bedrooms and Hallways (1998)
- Norman Ormal: A Very Political Turtle (1998)
- Ted and Ralph (1998)
- Eyes Wide Shut (1999)
- Last Christmas (1999)
- Kevin & Perry Go Large (2000)
- The Curse of Page 3 (TV documentary, 2003)
- Family Business (TV series, 2004)
