= Stanleytown =

Stanleytown may refer to:

- Stanleytown, Rhondda Cynon Taf, village in Wales
- Stanleytown, Virginia, census-designated place in Henry County, United States
