= 2006 British Academy Television Awards =

UK television awards ceremony

- Date: 7 May 2006
- Site: Grosvenor House Hotel
- Hosted by: Davina McCall

Highlights
- Best Comedy Series: Help
- Best Drama: Doctor Who
- Best Actor: Mark Rylance; The Government Inspector
- Best Actress: Anna Maxwell Martin; Bleak House
- Best Comedy Performance: Chris Langham The Thick of It

Television coverage
- Channel: ITV
- Ratings: 4.16 million

The 2006 British Academy Television Awards were held on Sunday 7 May at the Grosvenor House Hotel in London. The ceremony was hosted by television presenter Davina McCall and broadcast on ITV the following day. The nominees for the audience-voted Pioneer Award were announced on Tuesday 14 March; other nominees were revealed on Monday 27 March.

== Winners ==
- Best Actor
  - Winner: Mark Rylance — The Government Inspector (Channel 4)
  - Nominees: Bernard Hill — A Very Social Secretary (More4); Denis Lawson — Bleak House (BBC One); Rufus Sewell — The Taming of the Shrew (BBC One)
- Best Actress
  - Winner: Anna Maxwell Martin — Bleak House (BBC One)
  - Nominees: Gillian Anderson — Bleak House (BBC One); Lucy Cohu — The Queen's Sister (Channel 4); Anne-Marie Duff — Shameless (Channel 4)
- Best Comedy (Programme or Series)
  - Winner: Help (BBC / BBC Two)
  - Nominees: The Catherine Tate Show (Tiger Aspect Productions / BBC Two); Creature Comforts (Aardman Animations / ITV); Little Britain (BBC / BBC One / BBC Three)
- Best Comedy Performance
  - Winner: Chris Langham — The Thick of It (BBC Four);
  - Nominees: Peter Capaldi — The Thick of It (BBC Four); Ashley Jensen — Extras (BBC Two); Catherine Tate — The Catherine Tate Show (BBC Two)
- Best Drama Serial
  - Winner: Bleak House (BBC /Deep Indigo Productions/WGBH / BBC One)
  - Nominees: Fingersmith (Sally Head Productions / BBC One); Funland (BBC / BBC Three); To the Ends of the Earth (BBC / Power Productions / Tightrope Pictures / BBC Two)
- Best Drama Series
  - Winner: Doctor Who (BBC Wales / BBC One)
  - Nominees: Bodies (Hat Trick Productions / BBC Three); Shameless (Company Pictures / Channel 4); Spooks (Kudos Film & Television / BBC One)
- Best Single Drama
  - Winner: The Government Inspector (Mentorn Television/Stonehenge Films / arte France Cinéma / Channel 4)
  - Nominees: Much Ado About Nothing (BBC Northern Ireland / BBC One); The Queen's Sister (Touchpaper Television / Channel 4); Red Dust (BBC / Distant Horizon / Videovision Entertainment/Industrial Development Corporation of South Africa / BBC Films / BBC Two)
- Best Continuing Drama
  - Winner: EastEnders (BBC / BBC One)
  - Nominees: Casualty (BBC / BBC One); Coronation Street (Granada Television / ITV); Holby City (BBC / BBC One)
- Best Current Affairs
  - Winner: Dispatches - Beslan (??? / Channel 4)
  - Nominees: Panorama Special - Undercover Nurse (BBC / BBC One); Dispatches - Iraq: The Reckoning (??? / Channel 4); Storyville - A Company of Soldiers (??? / BBC Four)
- Best Entertainment Performance
  - Winner: Jonathan Ross — Friday Night with Jonathan Ross (BBC One)
  - Nominees: Jeremy Clarkson — Top Gear (BBC Two); Jack Dee — Jack Dee Live at the Apollo (BBC One); Noel Edmonds — Deal or No Deal (Channel 4)
- Best Factual Series or Strand
  - Winner: Jamie's School Dinners (Fresh One Productions / Channel 4)
  - Nominees: 49 Up (Granada Television / ITV); Cocaine (??? / Channel 4); Coast (BBC Birmingham / BBC Two)
- Best Feature
  - Winner: The Apprentice (Talkback Thames / BBC Two)
  - Nominees: Dragons' Den (BBC / BBC Two); Ramsay's Kitchen Nightmares (??? / Channel 4); Top Gear (BBC / BBC Two)
- Flaherty Award for Single Documentary
  - Winner: Make Me Normal (Century Films / Channel 4)
  - Nominees: Children of Beslan (??? / BBC Two); The Real Sex Traffic (??? / Channel 4); Taxidermy: Stuff the World (Century Films / BBC Two)
- Huw Wheldon Award for Specialist Factual
  - Winner: Holocaust, a Memorial Film From Auschwitz (BBC / BBC Two)
  - Nominees: The Boy with the Incredible Brain (Focus Productions / Five); Life in the Undergrowth (BBC Natural History Unit / BBC One); No Direction Home (Spitfire Pictures / BBC Two)
- Lew Grade Entertainment Programme or Series
  - Winner: The X Factor (Talkback Thames / SYCOtv / ITV)
  - Nominees: Friday Night with Jonathan Ross (Open Mike Productions / BBC One); Have I Got News For You (Hat Trick Productions / BBC One); Strictly Come Dancing (BBC / BBC One)
- News Coverage
  - Winner: BBC Ten O'Clock News - 7 July 2005, London Bombs (BBC / BBC One)
  - Nominees: Channel 4 News - The Attorney General Story (ITN / Channel 4); ITV Evening News - The Shooting of Jean Charles de Menezes (ITN / ITV); Sky News - 7 July bombings (Sky News)
- Situation Comedy Award
  - Winner: The Thick of It (BBC / BBC Four)
  - Nominees: Extras (BBC / HBO / BBC Two); Peep Show (Objective Productions / Channel 4); The Worst Week of My Life (Hat Trick Productions / BBC One)
- Sport
  - Winner: The Ashes - England v Australia (Sunset + Vine / Channel 4)
  - Nominees: Champions League Final Live: AC Milan v Liverpool (Granada Sport / ITV); Formula One - United States Grand Prix (North One Television / Granada Sport / ITV); The Open Championship - Final Round of Jack Nicklaus (BBC / BBC Two)
- Interactivity
  - Winner: Coast (BBC/BBC Two)
  - Nominees: Channel 4 News - Breaking the News (Illumina Digital / ITN / Channel 4 / More 4); Not Forgotten / Lost Generation (Wall To Wall / Darlow Smithson Productions / Channel 4); Shakespeare's Stories (BBC Interactive Drama and Entertainment / BBC One)
- The Pioneer Award
  - Winner: Doctor Who (BBC One)
  - Nominees: The Apprentice (BBC Two); Bleak House (BBC One); The Catherine Tate Show (BBC Two); Desperate Housewives (Channel 4); Jamie's School Dinners (Channel 4); Strictly Come Dancing (BBC One); The X-Factor (ITV)
- The Dennis Potter Award
  - Russell T Davies
- The Alan Clarke Award
  - Adam Curtis
- The Richard Dimbleby Award
  - Jamie Oliver
- Fellowship
  - Ken Loach
