= The Fast Show =

British TV comedy sketch show (1994–2014)

- Title card for the Fosters Funny series of The Fast Show
- Created by: Paul Whitehouse; Charlie Higson
- Starring: Paul Whitehouse; Charlie Higson; Arabella Weir; John Thomson; Caroline Aherne (1994–1997, 2011–2014); Simon Day; Mark Williams (1994–2000)
- Country of origin: United Kingdom
- Original language: English
- No. of series: 4
- No. of episodes: 28

Production
- Running time: 30 minutes; 6–8 minutes (web series)

Original release
- Network: BBC Two (1994–1997, 2000, 2014); Fosters Funny (online) (2011)
- Release: 27 September 1994 – 26 May 2014

The Fast Show is a BBC comedy sketch show that ran on BBC 2 from 1994 to 1997, with specials in 2000 and 2014. The show's central performers were Paul Whitehouse, Charlie Higson, Simon Day, Mark Williams, John Thomson, Arabella Weir and Caroline Aherne. Other significant cast members included Felix Dexter, Paul Shearer, Rhys Thomas, Jeff Harding, Maria McErlane, Eryl Maynard, Colin McFarlane and Donna Ewin.

Like the earlier Australian series Fast Forward, on which its format was based, it was loosely structured and reliant on character sketches, running gags and many catchphrases, its fast-paced "blackout" style setting it apart from traditional sketch series because of the number and relative brevity of its sketches; a typical half-hour TV sketch comedy of the period might have consisted of nine or ten major items, with contrived situations and extended setups, whereas the premiere episode featured 27 sketches in 30 minutes, with some items lasting less than ten seconds and none running longer than three minutes. Its style and presentation influenced many later series such as Little Britain and The Catherine Tate Show.

The show was released on VHS, DVD and audio CD. Some of its characters, such as Ted and Ralph and Swiss Toni, have had their own spin-off programmes. It also produced two national tours, the first in 1998, with the cast of the BBC surrealist comedy quiz show Shooting Stars, and the second, their Farewell Tour, in 2002. Higson announced on 5 September 2011 that The Fast Show would return for a new, online-only series. The series was later shown as two 30-minute parts rather than the original eleven short episodes as part of a 50th birthday celebration for BBC2, the channel on which it originally aired.

The cast reunited for a 30th anniversary live tour in 2024 and embarked on another tour in 2025.

== Background ==
The Fast Show was the brainchild of Paul Whitehouse and friend and writing partner Charlie Higson; Higson had previously enjoyed some success in the UK as a musician in the band The Higsons. After meeting through a mutual friend, comedian Harry Enfield invited Whitehouse to write for him. Whitehouse in turn asked Higson to help him out.

In the early 1990s, Higson and Whitehouse worked extensively with Vic Reeves and Bob Mortimer, writing for and performing in the series The Smell of Reeves and Mortimer and Bang Bang, It's Reeves and Mortimer (both of which Higson produced). These series also featured numerous appearances by future Fast Show cast members Caroline Aherne, Simon Day, Mark Williams and Rhys Thomas. Higson made many appearances in minor roles, while Williams and Whitehouse had recurring roles (with Vic and Bob) in The Smell of Reeves and Mortimer, parodying the members of rock group Slade in the "Slade in Residence" and "Slade on Holiday" sketches.

Inspired by a press preview tape of Enfield's show, compiled by producer friend Geoffrey Perkins and consisting of fast-cut highlights of Enfield's sketches, the pair began stockpiling material and developing the idea of a rapid-fire 'MTV generation'-format based on quick cuts and soundbites/catchphrases. After unsuccessfully trying to sell the series to ITV through an independent production company, Higson and Whitehouse approached the new controller of BBC2, Michael Jackson. He was looking for new shows at the time to replace several high-profile series that had been recently lost to BBC1, and their show was picked up.

== Style and content ==
Whitehouse and Higson, as co-producers and main writers, assembled the original team of writers and performers, which included David Cummings, Williams, Aherne, Paul Shearer, Day, Arabella Weir, John Thomson, Graham Linehan and Arthur Mathews (of Father Ted fame), Dave Gorman, Reeves, Mortimer and Craig Cash (who went on to write and perform with Aherne in The Royle Family). Musical director Philip Pope was also an established comedy actor with extensive experience in TV and radio comedy, and had previously appeared in series such as Who Dares Wins and KYTV; he also enjoyed success as a comedy recording artist as part of the HeeBeeGeebees, the Bee Gees parody group. The Fast Show was a working title disliked by both Whitehouse and Higson but it went unchanged through production and eventually remained as the final title.

The first series introduced many signature characters and sketches including Ted and Ralph, Unlucky Alf, the Fat Sweaty Coppers, Ron Manager, Roy and Renée, Ken and Kenneth (The Suit You Tailors), Arthur Atkinson, Bob Fleming, Brilliant Kid, Insecure Woman, Janine Carr, Denzil Dexter, Carl Hooper, Ed Winchester, the Patagonians, and the parody "Chanel 9".

Many characters were never named, with their sketches being written to give their catchphrase as the punchline of each sketch. Examples include "Anyone fancy a pint?" (played by Whitehouse), "You ain't seen me, right!" (a mysterious gangster-like character played by Mark Williams), "I'll get me coat" (Williams), and "Ha!", a sarcastic elderly woman played by Weir.

Other long-standing running jokes in the programme included the fictitious snack food "Cheesy Peas" in various forms, shapes and flavours, in satirical adverts presented by a northern boy who claims, "They're great for your teas!" and has since become a reality thanks to UK TV chef Jamie Oliver. The earnestness of the born-again Christian was parodied in another group of sketches where various characters responded to any comment or question by extolling the virtues of "Our Lord Jesus" and ended the sketch with the exclamation "He died for all our sins, didn't he?" or something similar; and "We're from the Isle of Man", featuring a stereotype of odd townsfolk in a setting portrayed as an impoverished and desolate cultural wasteland. The odd townsfolk included a brother and sister (Williams and Aherne) who wouldn't live away from the island 'because of the deviants', and strange man (Thomson) inviting people to see his liver and bacon collection on the island, a man who is light sensitive because his eyes are covered by his overgrown afro haircut (Whitehouse), and a man telling people to 'come to the Isle of Man' standing on a windy desolate beach (Higson).

Some of the characters resembled parodies of well-known personalities: for example, Louis Balfour, host of "Jazz Club" was reminiscent of Bob Harris of The Old Grey Whistle Test and Ron Manager of football pundits Jimmy Hill, Trevor Brooking and Graham Taylor. Paul Whitehouse said that Ron Manager was based on ex-Queens Park Rangers, Luton Town and Fulham manager Alec Stock. Arthur Atkinson is a composite of Arthur Askey and Max Miller.

After three series and a Christmas special, the show ended in 2000, with a three-part "Last Ever" show, the first episode of which Fast Show fan Johnny Depp had a guest-starring role as a customer of The Suit You Tailors.

The theme tune was "Release Me", a song which had been a hit for pop singer Engelbert Humperdinck. In the first series it was performed over the opening credits by Whitehouse in the guise of abnormally transfiguring singer Kenny Valentine. In subsequent series, the tune only appeared in the closing credits, played on the saxophone.

== List of regular characters and sketches ==
The show featured many characters and sketches. Some of the more prominent recurring characters/sketches are:

"Unlucky" Alf

- "Unlucky" Alf (Paul Whitehouse), a lonely old pensioner living somewhere in Northern England for whom nothing ever goes right. He often predicts an unfortunate, but obvious, event, only to encounter a worse event as he tries to avoid the first problem. His catchphrase is his resigned "Oh bugger!" as something terrible happens. (all series)
- "Anyone fancy a pint?" (Whitehouse), a man who finds himself in boring or bizarre situations, such as a dinner party where a woman is talking about how she was abandoned as a child and crying about everyone letting her down. Whitehouse then interrupts at the most insensitive moment asking "Anyone fancy a pint?", before he and most of the men in the room leave. One early sketch featured Higson portraying an earnest claymation animator (a parody of Nick Park) who describes the animation process in excruciatingly tedious detail by moving each feature "just a tiny amount" until Whitehouse's character sneaks away, whispering the punch line. According to an audio commentary as part of the extras in The Ultimate Fast Show Collection, Park loved the sketch and sent copies of it to friends and family that year as a video Christmas card.
- Archie the pub bore (Whitehouse). An elderly teddy boy like character with bad teeth, who talks to random people in the pub, and when they mention their profession, no matter what it is and however unlikely, he always claims to have had the same profession ("I used to be a single mother myself"), saying that it is the "hardest game in the world. Thirty years, man and boy!" He has an obsession with Frank Sinatra, almost invariably steering the conversation towards the singer and weakly singing the title line of "High Hopes", after mentioning how he and his friend Stan fared on a recent fishing trip, with Stan apparently being utterly hopeless at the pastime. (Whitehouse, Series 3)
- Arthur Atkinson (Whitehouse), parody of 1940s music hall entertainers such as Max Miller and Arthur Askey, introduced by Tommy Cockles (Day), himself a parody of presenters of TV history. Atkinson delivers mostly nonsensical jokes, and repeats his two signature phrases "How queer!" and "Where's me washboard?" This never fails to make the audience laugh (indicated by stock footage of real 1940s comedy show audiences). The only exception was a huge scandal caused by Atkinson saying the word "shit" in public. Atkinson's long-suffering sidekick Chester Drawers (Thomson) also appears, usually to an empty theatre, only for it to fill again as soon as Atkinson returns to the stage. Off camera, Atkinson is portrayed as a lecherous bully and sketches in later series feature him struggling to fit into the changing styles of comedy in the 1960s and 1970s (all series)
- Billy Bleach (Simon Day), tousle-mopped, interfering pub know-it-all who gets it all wrong, usually ending up with others losing money. His catchphrases include "Hold the bells" and "Someone's sitting there, mate". This character starred in his own series, Grass which was shown on BBC Three, later on BBC Two. (all series)
- Bob Fleming (Charlie Higson), the ageing, incompetent Norfolk host of Country Matters, who has an extremely bad cough. His surname is a pun on phlegm-ing. Country matters may be a Shakespearean euphemism for cunnilingus, from Hamlet. In addition to Bob, two of his friends – Clive Tucker, who cannot stop shouting 'Arse!' (Whitehouse) and Jed Thomas, who cannot stop sneezing (Williams) – make regular appearances on his show. These two characters switched names from series 2 onwards. (all series)
- Brilliant Kid (Whitehouse). In the first draft of the script for the pilot, this character was called Eric and was described as "a young Yorkshire man" but in the series he is never named. He delivers an edited monologue listing everyday things, all of which he declares to be "brilliant!" or "fantastic!" as he walks through a series of random backgrounds (filmed in various locations ranging from the Tees Valley to Iceland) during which the quality and format of the images also randomly changes (e.g., from colour to black-and-white). In one episode he expresses doubt about whether everything really is 'brilliant' or not, and as he is walking through one background, an abandoned funfair, he debates with himself halfheartedly ("Everything is brilliant... right? I mean... it might not be... nah, it is!") (all series)
- Carl Hooper (Day), Australian presenter of That's Amazing, a spoof of pop-science shows, in particular the Australian show The Curiosity Show. Normally such a person would try to pass off an everyday animal or object as something magical. The one occasion where a guest had a truly amazing story to tell was not able to be broadcast due to the guest's inability to refrain from swearing excitedly while relating the tale (all series)
- Chanel 9 (Whitehouse, Paul Shearer, Day, Caroline Aherne), a low-budget television channel from a country known only as "Republicca", or full title "Republicca Democratia Militaria" ruled by "El Presidente" who resembles a stereotypical Latin American dictator. Spoken in a concocted language loosely based on Italian, Greek, Spanish and Portuguese, mashed together with nonsensical phrases (e.g., "sminky pinky") and incongruous English names and words (e.g. footballer Chris Waddle). Early segments featured the Chanel 9 Neus, read by anchormen Poutremos Poutra-Poutros - later Poutremos Poutra-Poutremos (Whitehouse) and Kolothos Apollonia (Shearer), followed by the weather forecast with meteorologist Poula Fisch (Aherne), invariably reporting a temperature for all locations of 45 °C (113 °F) while exclaiming "Scorchio!" with apparent surprise, although in one episode a cloud appears, causing widespread panic. Later series would feature other Channel 9 programs including a children's channel (featuring an animation in the style of Dušan Vukotić's Oscar-winning 1961 animated film Surogat), a variety show and, in the 1996 Christmas special, a rock opera titled 'Holy Sprog'.
- Chip Cobb (John Thomson), the deaf stuntman, a TV and film stuntman who, because of his hearing problems, always mishears his instructions and proceeds to carry them out incorrectly before anyone can stop him, much to the despair of the film crew. In the East Midlands of England, a "chip cob" is a sandwich of chips made with a bread roll (known locally as a "cob"). (Thomson, series 3)
- Chris the Crafty Cockney (Whitehouse), claims to be an incurable kleptomaniac ("I'll nick anything, me"). He is left alone with something valuable and invariably steals it. Because of how upfront he is about his thieving nature, most people tend to believe he is joking. In one sketch, he even alludes to being an actual clinical kleptomaniac and involuntarily steals from his friend Dan after Dan trusts him to watch his newspaper stall, after extensively warning him of the risks involved in doing so. (series 2–3)
- Colin Hunt (Higson), unfunny and irritating office joker. Very socially inept, he compensates with humour by repeating catchphrases or making other extraneous cultural references ad nauseam (“The bells, Esmerelda, the bells!”), as well as multi-coloured clothing, and never being able to answer a question without adding one nonsensical remark after another. (series 2–3)
- Competitive Dad (Day), (series 2–3) Overcritical and demanding of his kids, he always has to get one up on them. For instance; playing a game of squash with his young son as though he were playing another adult skilled at the game, "Come on Toby!" Day explained in an interview that he had based the idea for the character on a man he noticed in a public swimming pool who challenged his two young children to a race. Day thought he would let them win, but instead he took off and stood on the other end of the pool waiting for his toddler sons to struggle their way across the pool. Day thought of it as "sick".
- Professor Denzil Dexter (Thomson), bespectacled, long-haired, bearded and highly laid-back scientist at the University of Southern California who conducts bizarre scientific experiments, the results of which are often disappointing. (series 1–2, online series)
- Different With Boys (Arabella Weir), a woman who is assertive and assured (sometimes to the point of over-confidence or bullying) when in the company of other women, but becomes coy, giggly and childishly winsome whenever a man enters the room. The character debuted in series 1 during a small segment in the credits, but only became a recurring character later on. (series 2)
- The 13th Duke of Wybourne (Whitehouse), posh, rumpled dinner-jacketed, lecherous cigar smoker, reminisces about finding himself in wholly unsuitable places, generally involving women, considering his "reputation". His only line is his signature phrase, which is always in the same format, but details vary – such as "Me, the 13th Duke of Wybourne? Here, in a women's prison at 3 AM? With my reputation? What were they thinking?" (series 3)
- The Fat Sweaty Coppers, a squad of police officers who cannot do their job properly as they are extremely overweight due to their constant eating and drinking. Some of these sketches were preceded by a parody of the opening of ITV police procedural The Bill. Two sets of legs would be shown walking down a street, dropping sweet wrappers, disposable cups and fast food containers as they go. Another sketch parodies the 1994 movie Speed. (Thomson and Weir included, series 1-2)
- Girl Men Can't Hear (Weir), a woman who tries to put forward an idea to a group of men but is completely ignored, only for a man in that group to repeat what she has just said and receive congratulations from the others for having had such a good idea. This character was invented by Weir to parody similar experiences she had had with the men in the Fast Show team.
- "I'll Get Me Coat" (Mark Williams), a socially inept Brummie, who is unable to make any appropriate contribution to a conversation, and disgraces himself with a faux pas before using the punchline and leaving. However, in one sketch his accent disappears as the character tries to upstage his friends as to how middle-class he is. (all series)
- "I'm not Pissed", a family – mother (Maria McErlane), father (Williams) and son (Day) – who regularly point out that they are not drunk despite the fact they are taking regular sly swigs from gin bottles, beer cans, and the like hidden throughout the house. The family also includes a grandfather (Whitehouse), who can be found outside the house resolutely, but unconvincingly, singing the family mantra "I'm not pissed". (series 2)
- Indecisive Dave (Whitehouse), a man who tries to have opinions about the topic du jour whilst talking with his mates (Day and Williams) in the pub, but finds himself convinced by whoever last spoke. As a result he fails to come to a conclusion about anything and lives his life in a state of perpetual bewilderment. (all series)
- Insecure Woman (Weir), appears in a variety of different locations, usually exclaiming, "Does my bum look big in this?" (all series). Weir subsequently published a novel, Does My Bum Look Big in This?: the Diary of an Insecure Woman (1998).
- Jesse (Williams), a taciturn country bumpkin who exclaims his strange diets, fashion tastes and experiments, in a single sentence "This week, I 'ave been mostly..." - except for one sketch, where he says "This week, I 'aven't been 'ungry." (series 2–3)
- John Actor (Day), who plays Inspector Monkfish, the title character in a fictional BBC police drama. Monkfish is a "tough, uncompromising cop" who often exclaims to the nearest woman, "Put your knickers on and make me a cup of tea!" (series 2–3, online series). There were variations on the show's format, two examples being Monkfish as a "tough, uncompromising doctor" in Monkfish M.D. and Monkfish as a "tough, uncompromising vet" in All Monkfish Great and Small. One Monkfish sketch even crossed over onto Chanel 9 with a promo for a series named after him with his catchphrase spoken in the channel's comedic language. Sometime between the end of series 3 and the last episode, John Actor dies yet the series is apparently continuing in the manner of Taggart after the death of the lead actor.
- Johnny Nice Painter (Higson), an artist who revels in painting landscapes outdoors, alongside his wife. As he paints he describes the various colours. But whenever he or his wife Katie (Weir) mentions the colour "black", he becomes overtaken by depression and, despite his wife's best efforts, suffers a psychotic episode, shouting wildly about the despair of mankind ("Where are we sleeping tonight, mother? Father's grave?", "You lock me in a cellar and feed me pins!"). His appearance is allegedly based on bearded TV painter Alwyn Crawshaw. (series 3, online series)
- Ken and Kenneth (Whitehouse and Williams), two tailors in a men's formal wear shop, who bombard potential customers with sexually explicit innuendo about their private life, frequently interjecting the catchphrase "Ooh! Suit you, sir!," much to the discomfort of the customer. They become confused and even frightened in two episodes; one when they get a customer who is gay, and another with a customer (Day) who is as willing to talk about sexual proclivities as they are. Due to Williams's absence from the online series, his character Kenneth was written out and replaced by Kenton, played by Charlie Higson. (Ken and Kenneth: series 1,2,3; Ken and Kenton: online specials)
- Louis Balfour (Thomson), pretentious and ultra laid-back presenter of Jazz Club (a parody of The Old Grey Whistle Test), based on a blend of Bob Harris and Roger Moore. Seemingly having done his "research", he introduces his guests by comparing them to avant-garde jazz musicians or describing their style/technique by using complex musical phraseology. These guests usually turn out to be utterly talentless "experimentalists", generally to his bemusement. Although he also often appears to appreciate the music, on one occasion he follows his apparent appreciation with a look of disgust. His catchphrase "Nice!" is delivered after turning to a different camera for that word only; he later delivers other words in a similar manner. His jazz characters often have ridiculous names of real places, such as 'Theydon Bois' on drums and 'Stamford Brook' on bass (both stations on the London Underground), and 'Stepney Green', son of Soylent. Some guests appear to be obvious parodies of real musicians such as Jay Kay, Tony Bennett and Nigel Kennedy. In one episode Jazz Club is replaced by "Indie Club", presented by the abrasive Simon Rhodes (Day) as a parody of the music journalism of the time. His musical guests, Colon, are described as dangerous and uncompromising, only for the music to be twee jangly indie-pop.(series 2–3, online series)
- "No Offence" (Weir), also known as Pushy Saleswoman, a rude, orange-faced South African department store cosmetics saleswoman who has no qualms about informing women of their physical imperfections, seemingly oblivious to the fact that she herself is unattractive. (series 3)
- "Our" Janine Carr (Aherne), a teenage mum with a unique world outlook. She refuses to reveal who the father of her baby is because "it's not fair to grass on your headmaster". She often speaks about celebrities she loves and is sometimes sitting in her bedroom with several posters of a celebrity on the walls. Some of these are realistic, such as Lisa Stansfield and Brian Harvey, others less so (Cliff Richard and Queen Elizabeth The Queen Mother). (series 1–2, online series)
- The Patagonians a group of South American musicians who seem to never be able to get further than a few seconds into a song before it degenerates into a tuneless shambles. They play in bizarre locations, and notable instruments they use are pan pipes, an acoustic guitar and maracas.
- Patrick Nice (Williams), a man who tells far-fetched, sometimes odd stories, usually containing an element of extraordinary fortune or success, such as his son winning the Nobel Prize – followed by calmly saying his catchphrase, "Which was nice." (series 2–3)
- Ron Manager (Whitehouse), a football pundit who speaks in incoherent sentence fragments on randomly divergent trains of thought. He usually appears with presenter Clive Graham (Day) and fellow Scottish pundit Tommy Stein (Williams), and whenever a question is posed to Tommy, Ron Manager often begins one of his "stream of consciousness" monologues based on one of the words or names in the question, often finishing with youngsters playing with "jumpers for goalposts". Based on former football manager from the 1960s and 1970s Alec Stock. (all TV and online series)
- Rowley Birkin QC (Whitehouse), a retired barrister, tells mostly unintelligible stories at the fireside. Occasionally, his speech becomes coherent for a short while, containing strange phrases such as "The whole thing was made completely out of matchsticks" or "Snake! Snake!" Almost always ends his stories with a sly "I'm afraid I was very, very drunk". In the final episode of series 2, his rambling anecdote appeared to involve a woman for whom he had great affection and ended with a close-up of faint tears on his cheeks, while the usual "very drunk" line was delivered in an unexpectedly moving, sorrowful voice. The character is reprised as a working barrister in the spin-off feature Ted and Ralph. Whitehouse revealed on the UK chatshow Parkinson that the character was based on his friend Andrew Rollo whom he met on a fishing trip to Iceland; Rollo appeared in a Suit You, Sir! The Inside Leg of the Fast Show documentary in 1999, which revealed how closely Rowley's speech resembled that of his real-life inspiration. At the end of a Christmas episode the caption revealed that he has died. "Rowley Birkin QC 1918 – 2000"; however, despite this on-screen demise he appeared in the 2011 online specials. (TV series 2–3, and online series)
- Roy and Renée (Thomson and Aherne), a northern couple, with endless chattering from Renée and subdued nodding from her quiet, submissive husband Roy, whom she expects to agree meekly with everything she says. Roy always embarrasses her at the end of every sketch, after which he gets a stinging reprimand from his wife. She makes her last appearance in the show during the 1996 Christmas Special, when Roy's mother finally gives in to holding back her resentment towards Renée's smug attitude. (series 1–2). In the 2020 Gold documentary The Fast Show: Just A Load Of Blooming Catchphrases, made after the death of Aherne, Roy sits alone on the sofa in his house, sad and mute now that the evidently deceased Renée is no longer there to chastise him.
- Rubbish Dad (Thomson), the father and opposite of Brilliant Kid who proclaims everything to be "rubbish." He is usually only seen in an industrial scrapheap area. The only things he does like are Elvis, Hitler and Des Lynam. (all series)
- Simon and Lindsey (Higson and Whitehouse), two offroaders and extreme sport enthusiasts who, despite their unusually high confidence and self-esteem, are useless at their hobby ("It's gripped!," "It's sorted!"). (all series)
- Swiss Toni (Higson), a car salesman who, usually in the presence of his bemused trainee Paul (Rhys Thomas), compares everything to seducing and making love to a beautiful woman. The character later appeared in a spin-off sitcom, also titled Swiss Toni, set in his car dealership. Swiss is one of the few non-original characters in the show (another being Tommy Cockles), having previously appeared in the second series of The Smell of Reeves and Mortimer in 1995, which was produced by Higson and featured cameos from many members of The Fast Show. Charlie Higson stated that the voice was based on his own poor impersonation of Sean Connery. (TV series 3 and online)
- Ted and Ralph (Whitehouse and Higson) – repressed country squire Lord Ralph Mayhew attempts to strike up a relationship with his introverted Irish estate worker Ted, by way of subtle erotic subtexts in his conversations with him. Also the title of a one-off, hour-long spin-off feature, reprising the characters, with cameos from a few other characters. (all TV and online series)
- Two Builders, who are always shown on their lunch break with one (Simon Day) telling stories of his life experiences to his working mate (Williams). Catchphrase: "Did I f...", the punch-line of his story is cut off at the end of every sketch by television static noise.
- "You ain't seen me, right?" (Williams), an unknown traveller who says "You ain't seen me, right?" to some minor characters in the show and sometimes the viewer. He comes up in the show in various locations, always wearing a sheepskin coat, and is at one point on Chanel 9 News sitting in the sports reporter's seat. He is also seen in the background when the Brilliant Kid walks past. (all series)

=== Recurring characters and sketches ===
- Checkout Girl (Aherne), a simple and chatty young woman working behind the till at a supermarket who passes comment on every item the customer buys regardless of the personal or sensitive nature of the product: "K-Y Jelly... bit of vaginal dryness?" (series 3)
- Ed Winchester (Jeff Harding), an American reporter. He beams at the camera introduces himself, "Hi! I'm Ed Winchester!", in an upbeat voice. In one sketch, someone else (Colin McFarlane) introduced himself with "Hi! I'm Ed Winchester!" He later replied with "No I'm not. I don't know why I just said that." (series 1-2)
- "Even Better Than That!" (Williams), a slack-jawed, not too bright man who comes back from the shops with something ridiculously unnecessary instead of what his wife sent him out for. Written by Bob Mortimer. (series 3)
- Sir Geoffrey Norman MP (Higson), a politician who responds to all questions (however innocuous) as if he were performing on-air political damage limitation, refusing outright to answer the question, stonewalling or speaking in legal-ese to explain why he will not answer. (series 2)
- Gideon Soames (Day), white-haired, posh-talking architecture and history professor, possibly a cross between Simon Schama and Brian Sewell, with some elements of Bamber Gascoigne. Despite the serious tone of his speeches, their content becomes increasingly ridiculous, such as an executioner that lived in a hollowed out tree and a monastic order that never washed. (series 2–3)
- The Historian (Williams), a jubilant, but emotionally imbalanced man who patrols the corridors of an historic boys academy alone whilst telling tall tales about former traditions both cruel and unreasonable. (series 3)
- "Six Hours In Make-Up" (Thomson), an over-the-top thespian describes his character and mentions that he needs to spend six hours being made up when actually it takes a few seconds (series 3)
- Monster Monster (Whitehouse), a vampire who creeps up on a slumbering woman and gives her betting advice (series 3). The set-up is a parody of a scene from the 1922 German classic horror film Nosferatu, while the vampire's voice and catchphrase of "Monster, monster" are based on Eric Hall.
- Roger Nouveau: Football Fan (Thomson), a man who seems to talk a lot about football as if a true Arsenal supporter, but makes it glaringly obvious he knows nothing about the game. In one sketch he celebrates an opposing team's goal whilst eating from a picnic basket, a reference to the Prawn sandwich brigade (series 3)
- The Hurried Poor, a father (Williams), mother and two children only seen in extremely short sketches in which they are rushing from place to place in a panic for no apparent reason. The father is constantly shrieking at his family to "run" or "come on!"
- Shagging Couple (Higson and Donna Ewin), a childless couple who are seen in the midst of sexual intercourse, much to the discomfort of their neighbours, in, among other places, a tent in a sports shop, a tree in the park, and even on a bed being carried by removal men as they move into the neighbourhood. (series 2)
- Inept Zookeeper (Williams), a zookeeper who is frightened or disgusted by virtually every aspect of his job (cleaning up elephant dung, feeding the penguins, for example) and is thus rendered unable to perform his tasks properly. (series 3)
- Young at heart (Whitehouse and Thomson), a group of outwardly serious and professional executives who converse in often complex financial terminology until one is distracted by an excavator at a building site or a cute picture in the company calendar, when they start acting like little kids. (series 2)
- The Unpronouncables! (Day and Higson), a parody of the black and white Gangster film in which the cast have great difficulty with the 'lingo' and pronouncing their unusual nicknames. (series 1-2)
- Dave Angel, Eco-Warrior (Day), an unlikely-looking environmental activist. His well meaning monologues are always undermined by the actions of his bimbo wife. Introduced with theme song "Moonlight Shadow". (series 3)
- Andy (Day), a married man who is an office worker that assumes every woman that talks to him in the office is wanting to have an affair. In one sketch he even interrupts a male colleague asking for his advice with 'I don't mean to offend you, but basically i'm just not gay...' (series 1)
- Trudi (Weir), a female singer who makes several appearances on Chanel 9. (all series)
- Mikki Disco (Higson), a male singer who make several appearances on Chanel 9. (series 2–3)
- The Dog Trainer (Eryl Maynard), a female dog trainer who tells the viewers about her dog Quail's exercises, but when she repeatedly tells him to do it, every time Quail doesn't budge; until she sheepishly says "he's never done that before" to the viewers. The final time she was seen, she got really angry at Quail not moving an inch at an obstacle course. (series 3)

== Johnny Depp ==
In Pirates of the Caribbean: The Curse of the Black Pearl, Jack Sparrow (played by Johnny Depp) quotes the show, the Rowley Birkin line "... and then they made me their chief!". In a deleted scene of the movie, Sparrow also uses the Mark Williams catchphrase "I'll get me coat." Depp is a major fan of The Fast Show and an ardent admirer of Paul Whitehouse, whom he once described as "the greatest actor in the world". In 2000, Depp made a cameo appearance as the hapless customer in the 'Suit You, Sir' sketch in the Fast Show farewell special, and in a 2015 interview, he commented: "It was absolutely one of my proudest achievements. No question. It was one of my favourite things, to have been on the last Fast Show." Whitehouse also had voice acting roles in Depp's movies Finding Neverland, Corpse Bride, Alice in Wonderland, and its sequel Alice Through the Looking Glass. Depp's 2015 movie Mortdecai featured Whitehouse in a minor role, and has been noted for alluding to Fast Show characters.

== Filming locations ==
Much of The Fast Show was shot externally, unusually for a sketch show. Early on in the series much of this filming was done in and around the North East of England: County Durham, Tyne and Wear, Northumberland, Teesside and also North Yorkshire. Locations included:

- Alnwick
- Ashington, Northumberland – at least two scenes involving Unlucky Alf and one involving Brilliant Kid were filmed on Station Road there.
- Barnard Castle - Barnard Castle Boarding School was used.
- Darlington – the childhood home of Jim Moir (Vic Reeves) whose long-term comedy partner Bob Mortimer was one of the writers. "The Running Family" were shown around various locations in the town centre, including the Cornmill Centre The Cornmill and High Street were in scenes involving Brilliant Kid. Binns Department Store was also featured in sketches involving Arabella Weir.
- Durham – the marketplace was featured in scenes involving Brilliant Kid.
- Hartlepool – one Ron Manager scene had him sitting in the empty Rink End Stand of Hartlepool United's ground, Victoria Park. Also, one Ed Winchester scene was in front of the Mill House Stand. Some of the Brilliant Kid scenes were also filmed at nearby Seal Sands.
- Keld, North Yorkshire – the campsite was used in a Dave Angel scene.
- Langley Park – Railway Street was used in Unlucky Alf scenes.
- Middlesbrough – its docks were used in Chip Cobb's scenes, other scenes were shot on the Transporter Bridge (where the Two Builders supposedly sit) and the Riverside Stadium. frequently used in other scenes.
- Newcastle upon Tyne – including the "Shore Leave" sketch, the scene where Chris the Crafty Cockney steals the woman's suitcases (shot at Newcastle station), and some of the Sir Geoffrey Norman MP sketches, such as the one where he is pulled over by a policeman for speeding and the one where he refuses to pay the taxi driver after getting out of the car (which was shot outside the main entrance to Newcastle station). One Ed Winchester scene was near Monument station. One scene from the Brilliant Kid showed him in Exhibition Park. Many scenes involving Janine Carr, filmed in greyscale, used the backdrop of the concrete flyover and underpasses of the junction of the A167(M) and the B1318 of the Great North Road in Jesmond. A few scenes were filmed inside the Newcastle City Library (which has since been demolished and a new library building has replaced it).
- Ormesby Hall – background in early Ted and Ralph scenes.
- Redcar – scenes with Brilliant Kid walking along the beach. Also Mark Williams appears in a caravan park near South Gare, with the steelworks in the distance.
- Richmond – its marketplace was used in Ted and Ralph's trip to the shops.
- Scotch Corner – its garage used in Swiss Toni's early scenes.
- Seaton Carew – one "You ain't seen me, right?" scene had the main character sitting on a child's ride in one of the seafront amusement arcades.
- The Spanish City, Whitley Bay, Tyne and Wear – a number of scenes involving Brilliant Kid.
- Stockton On Tees – Swiss Toni scenes, filmed at a car showroom on Norton Road.
- Washington.

Also for the third series the production extended abroad to Iceland:

- Scenes with Brilliant Kid and Billy Bleach were shot with Iceland's volcanic landscapes, waterfalls and hot springs in the background.

== Transmissions ==
Series	Start date	End date	Episodes	Channel
1	27 September 1994	1 November 1994	6	BBC Two
2	16 February 1996	29 March 1996	7	BBC Two
Christmas special	27 December 1996			BBC Two
3	14 November 1997	29 December 1997	8	BBC Two
Suit You, Sir! The Inside Leg of the Fast Show	11 September 1999			BBC Two
You Ain't Seen All These, Right?	11 September 1999			BBC Two
4 (Last Fast Show Ever)	26 December 2000	28 December 2000	3	BBC Two
I Love the 100 Best Top Ten Lists of the Fast Show EVER!	1 January 2002			BBC Two
5	10 November 2011	3 April 2012	13 (original); 2 (BBC re-cut)	Fosters Funnies
5	23 May 2014	26 May 2014	13 (original); 2 (BBC re-cut)	BBC Two
The Fast Show: Just A Load Of Blooming Catchphrases	Saturday 29 August 2020	Sunday 30 August 2020	2	Gold

== Reception ==
The show won two Bafta awards in 1997.

== Related programming ==
At the conclusion of the third series, there was a one-off spinoff, Ted & Ralph, which aired on 27 December 1998 on BBC Two. They were the first characters to have their own spinoff show outside the sketches.

In 1999, The Fast Show did a number of adverts for Holsten Pils, featuring Ken and Kenneth, Chanel 9 news with Kolothos Apollonia and Poutremos Poutra-Poutros, a Mexican band, a Chanel 9 cooking segment with Mark Williams playing a chef, Jesse, Bob Fleming and The Unpronounceables.

In 2001, Ron Manager, Tommy and the interviewer fronted a comedy panel game show on Sky 1 called "Jumpers for Goalposts". The interviewer was the presenter while Ron Manager and Tommy were the resident team captains.

Swiss Toni featured the eponymous character in a stand-alone series broadcast on BBC Three in 2003 and 2004. The first three episodes of the first series were repeated on BBC One.

In 2006, Higson and Whitehouse produced and performed in Down the Line, a spoof talkback show for BBC Radio 4, hosted by Rhys Thomas, which featured many of the regular Fast Show cast, including Higson, Whitehouse, Simon Day, Arabella Weir and Felix Dexter. Further series were broadcast in 2007, 2008, 2011 and 2013. A follow-on TV series, Bellamy's People, was broadcast in 2010.

== Online series ==
Speaking on the BBC Two show Something for the Weekend on 9 September 2007, Higson mentioned the upcoming DVD boxed set release and that a reunion of some sort to help promote it was being considered. This took place at the Dominion Theatre in London on Sunday 4 November, and was a collection of some new sketches, videos of cast favourites and performances of classic sketches (including the return of Ed Winchester). Higson and Whitehouse stated they were working on a film script which would feature the Fast Show team, but would not have any of the characters from the show.

A new online-only series was commissioned in a sponsorship deal with Foster's Lager, and aired beginning 14 November 2011; the trailer was released on 9 November on Foster's YouTube Channel. New episodes featured the original cast with the exception of Mark Williams, who declined involvement in the project due to scheduling clashes.

== Home media releases ==
=== VHS Releases ===
VHS name	Region 2	Ep #	Additional information
The Fast Show	7th August 1995	1	A compilation of all the best bits from Series 1.
Series 2, Part One	7th April 1997	3	Contains Episodes 1-3. (Due to contractual obligations, certain cuts have been made to this video)
Series 2, Part Two	7th April 1997	4	Contains Episodes 4-7. (Due to contractual obligations, certain cuts have been made to this video)
The Christmas Special	10th November 1997	1	Contains an extended version of the 1996 Christmas Special with 10 minutes of previously unshown footage.
Series 3, Part One	1st March 1999	4	Contains Episodes 1-4.
Series 3, Part Two	1st March 1999	4	Contains Episodes 5-8. (Due to contractual obligations, certain cuts have been made to this video)
You Ain't Seen (All Of) These... Right?	15th November 1999	1	Contains an extended 50 minute version of the original 30 minute special.

=== DVD Releases ===
DVD name	Region 1	Region 2	Region 4	Ep #	Additional information
Series One	-	5 August 2002	-	6	Includes cast interviews with Paul Whitehouse and Charlie Higson, Simon Day, Arabella Weir and Mark Williams.
Series Two	-	18 August 2003	-	7	
Series Three	-	30 August 2004	-	9	Also includes the 1996 Christmas Special (Extended Version).
The Last Fast Show Ever, Part One	-	4 December 2000	-	1	Contains a condensed version of the 3-part special with exclusive additional and extended sketches not found in the original TV broadcast.
The Fast Show Live	-	18 November 2002	-	1	Recorded live at London's Hammersmith Apollo in 1998
The Fast Show Farewell Tour	-	24 November 2003	-	1	Recorded live at Cardiff International Arena, November 2002.
The Ultimate Fast Show Collection	-	5 November 2007	-	28	A 7-DVD box set which compiled nearly all their material from 1994-2000, except the two live DVD releases and their spin-off series/specials.

=== VHS/DVD Edits ===
Series 1, Episode 1

- The first Roy & Renée sketch is removed from the 2007 The Ultimate Fast Show Collection DVD boxset, and only included on the original Series 1 2002 DVD release.
- The band Level 42 performing their song "Forever Now" during the end credits (after the "Comedy Vicar" sketch) is included on the original Series 1 2002 DVD release, but was removed from The Ultimate Fast Show Collection DVD boxset.

Series 2, Episode 1

- On-screen captions and graphics for various sketches (such as those on "Jesse's Diets", "Return of the Unpronouncables", "Rowley Berkin Q.C.", etc.) for the entire Series 2 are removed from the 2007 The Ultimate Fast Show Collection DVD boxset. However, Episode 1 from the original Series 2 2003 DVD release retains all these. All VHS and DVD releases of Series 2 have added "Chanel 9"-style episode numbers over the first sketch of each episode.
- Ken and Kenneth sketch signature background music "Some Enchanted Evening" performed by The Mantovani Orchestra has been replaced with similar sounding music for both the 2003 Series 2 release and the 2007 The Ultimate Fast Show Collection DVD boxset and The Fast Show 2 Audio CD.
- "I'll Get Me Coat" sketch originally included Simply Red's song "Fairground" playing in the background, but has been replaced with similar-sounding instrumental music for the 2007 The Ultimate Fast Show Collection DVD boxset. The original Series 2 2003 DVD release retains the original song.

Series 2, Episode 3

- All sketches featuring Fred Halibut & His Little Banjolele (played by Mark Williams) have been removed due to music rights as the character (despite the 1940s Music hall setting) is singing songs by Prince. Songs sung are "Gett Off", "Cream", "Darling Nikki" and "Sexy MF".
- During "The Cute Disabled Man" sketch (a parody of Forrest Gump), Bruce Springsteen's "Born in the U.S.A." has been replaced by instrumental rock music.

Series 2, Episode 4

- The broadcast version has an extra Newlyweds sketch during the end credits, which was removed from home media releases.

Series 2, Episode 5

- The Chanel 9 A Question of Sport parody butchery sequence is extended by 7 seconds on DVD compared to the original broadcast version.

1996 Christmas Special

- The original broadcast version features George Michael's "Careless Whisper" played in the background during one of the Colin Hunt sketches which has been replaced by an alternative instrumental track on the Extended Version. Some broadcasts have since used either the alternative music or not used any music at all.

You Ain't Seen These, Right!

- The original broadcast version features Louis Armstrong's version of "What a Wonderful World" played at the end of the "I'm not Pissed" family sketch as they contemplate their New Year's resolution of "giving up the drink". This was replaced on home media releases with a cover of the song by another artist.

== "You Ain't Seen These, Right!" ==
"You Ain't Seen These, Right!" was a one-off programme, shown during BBC 2's Fast Show Night, featuring various sketches which were filmed, predominantly from the third series, that did not make it onto the final show. Some of these were:

- Mid-Life Crisis Man (Higson), a "henpecked", scruffy loser who leaves his wife and begins dating a beautiful young woman. The other members of his golf club are initially dismissive of him as a sad old man particularly when he begins wearing unsuitable clothes, getting tattoos and having his belly button pierced. They become much more interested however when his girlfriend invites one of her equally attractive friends to the lads' night out.
- Ranting Man (Williams), a chain-smoking car driver who rants about anything and everything through his wound-down window. He drives around Harlesden, London. A study in road rage.
- The King (Day), a medieval king who "loves being king" because he gets to boss everyone about.
- A middle-aged man (Thomson), who always finds an excuse to leave the room as soon as the conversation gets round to "women's things."
- Shagging Man (Whitehouse), who responds to almost every question, accusation and situation with the phrase "Sorry, but I was up all night, shagging."
- Dave Morris (Thomson), who spray-paints graffiti on a police station wall and inside an art gallery, but then claims it was done by someone else.
- Andy (Day), a married man who rejects the other ladies in the office and speaks to his wife, Ruth, to say that for the last time he is not having an affair, which was originally written for Series 1 until it got delayed for broadcast on this special.
- Brilliant Kid (Whitehouse), who gets told to 'shut it!' by a stroppy girl (Aherne) every time he tries talking about girls, which was originally written for either Series 1 or 2 until it got delayed for broadcast on this special.

An extended 50-minute version of the original 30-minute special was included in the UK edition of the VHS boxed-set of Series 3 and on the seven-disc Ultimate Fast Show DVD boxed-set.
