= Ted (dog) =

British dog

- Species: Canis familiaris
- Breed: Patterdale Terrier
- Sex: Male
- Born: 2012
- Died: April 2026 (aged 13–14)
- Known for: Mortimer & Whitehouse: Gone Fishing
- Owner: Lisa Clark

Instagram information
- Page: ted_gonefishing
- Years active: 2021–2026
- Followers: 284,000

Ted (c. late 2012–April 2026) was a British Patterdale Terrier mix dog, best known for his appearances on the BBC Two television series Mortimer & Whitehouse: Gone Fishing. He was owned by Gone Fishing executive producer Lisa Clark, who rescued him from a rescue centre (DBARC - Diana Brimblecombe Animal Rescue Centre) in Berkshire in 2013.

Ted made his television debut in the third episode of the third series, which aired on 6 September 2020. He went on to make regular appearances throughout the series, alongside Bob Mortimer and Paul Whitehouse. He was later awarded a 'lifetime achievement award' in the 2025 Christmas special. Ted also served as the "Ambassadog" for the Assistance Dog Assessment Association.

Ted published two books (written by Clark) with Ebury Spotlight, A Pawtobiography (2024) and Pup Fiction (2025), with both appearing on The Sunday Times Bestseller List. A third book is set to be released later in 2026. Ted also amassed over 282,000 followers on Instagram as of April 2026.

Ted's death at the age of 13 was announced on 30 April 2026. He appeared posthumously in the ninth series of Gone Fishing.

== Bibliography ==
- A Pawtobiography: My adventures on Gone Fishing. By Ted the Dog with Lisa Clark. London: Ebury Spotlight, 2024. ISBN 9781529965896.
- Pup Fiction: An epic journey with Gone Fishing. By Ted the Dog with Lisa Clark. London: Ebury Spotlight, 2025. ISBN 9781529992694.

== See also ==
- List of individual dogs
