= Chuck Steel: Night of the Trampires =

2018 British stop-motion action comedy horror film

- Directed by: Mike Mort
- Written by: Mike Mort
- Starring: Mike Mort; Jennifer Saunders; Paul Whitehouse; Dan Russel; Jonnie Fiori; Samantha Coughlan
- Cinematography: Laura Howie
- Production company: Animortal Studio
- Release dates: 12 June 2018; (Annecy International Animation Film Festival, France)
- Running time: 90 minutes
- Country: United Kingdom
- Language: English
- Budget: $20 million

Chuck Steel: Night of the Trampires is a 2018 British stop-motion animated action comedy horror film written and directed by Mike Mort, who also stars the titular lead role. The film follows Chuck Steel, a no-nonsense maverick renegade cop who is pitted against a horde of vampire-like beings who feast upon the blood of those who are drunk. The film parodies and pays homage to live action films of the 1980s. It had its premiere at the Annecy International Animation Film Festival in France on 12 June 2018.

== Plot ==
The movie opens in 1986 Los Angeles, with a drunken man and woman heading home after a night out. The man stumbles into a huge, hairy homeless guy—who turns out to be a monster—and gets bitten on the neck. The woman then runs into another equally terrifying homeless creature, gets bitten too, but escapes, only to be hit by a speeding police car.

In a flashback/dream sequence, renegade cop Chuck Steel relives the dramatic loss of his wife—kidnapped by the local Yakuza and sent plunging from a helicopter to her death. He snaps awake just before crashing into a circus billboard, gets ready, and catches a TV report about the Governor’s plans to reduce alcohol use and help the homeless. Irritated, he shoots the TV, heads to work, and meets his new partner, rookie cop Barney. Together they take down some gangsters with massive collateral damage, while Steel rants about hating partners and preferring to work alone. Summoned by his captain, Jack Schitt, Steel is chewed out for his extreme methods and told Barney shot himself after being traumatised. Determined to give Steel a partner, the captain offers a choice between a Swedish woman, a monkey, or a cheese plant. Steel picks the woman, only to be shocked when she turns out to be huge, clumsy, and awkwardly masculine.

The pair proceed to the hospital to question the woman from the opening scene, only to discover an elderly British man standing over her with a stake in hand. They arrest him, and during interrogation, he identifies himself as supernatural hunter Professor Abraham Van Rental. He claims he was about to stake her because she was transforming into a Trampire. Van Rental recounts that when vampires once ruled Transylvania, they were eventually driven out by the locals, leaving them destitute and scavenging like vagrants. Over time, they became despondent, turned to binge drinking, and their thirst for blood merged with their craving for alcohol. Now, they prey exclusively on individuals with high blood alcohol levels. Steel dismisses the account and has him locked up. Jack then reminds him of a scheduled anger management session with the department psychiatrist, Dr Alex Cular. Initially resistant, he eventually attends. During the session, Steel remains cautious and avoids discussing his wife, but he grows increasingly uneasy about how Cular has left the rest of the station barely stable and ineffective.

In a quick montage, the Trampires continue to attack and multiply over the next few days. Meanwhile, Van Rental breaks out of prison and heads to the hospital to stake the woman from earlier. However, Steel arrives just in time to stop him, now convinced of the danger. He yanks the drapes open, allowing sunlight to burn the Trampire, but not before she warns that the "Master" will make them pay. She then morphs into a bat and bites Chuck on the nose. In the ensuing scuffle, they manage to take down the bat; however, Chuck's partner falls out of the window to her death. Back at the station, Steel and Van Rental try to convince Jack of the danger, explaining that since Chuck was bitten, he’ll become a Trampire by midnight. The captain dismisses it as another one of Chuck’s wild conspiracy theories—like his claim that the governor is an Illuminati lizard man—but gives Steel until midnight to sort it out. Still, he assigns Giggles the monkey as Steel’s new partner.

Van Rental and Steel decide to get drunk to draw out the Trampires, during which Van Rental discloses that the Master is a Trampire destined to cause “The Lock-In,” a time when the sun will be blocked out and everyone on Earth will drink constantly, creating an endless food supply for the Trampires. However, a chosen one is also destined to defeat them. After several failed attempts to find Trampires, they disguise Chuck as a woman, knowing couples are more likely to be attacked, and manage to find one. They follow it back to its lair, only to discover the Master is actually Cular. She plans to render the LAPD ineffective so they can easily find the “Puritan,” a figure they must kill to trigger the Lock-In, whom Steel and Van Rental correctly guess is the Governor.

Van Rental and Steel are captured by Cular, who reveals that Chuck’s wife didn’t actually die; she left him for a clown. A truth that was kept hidden to protect his image. The two are tied up as Cular and her Trampires head to the circus, where the governor will be, to execute their plan. Giggles helps them escape but is killed by a Trampire pig, who then abducts Van Rental. Steel returns to his apartment to prepare for the showdown, only to discover that his landlord, Gussman, and his pet parrot are also Trampires. In the chaos, they accidentally trigger Chuck’s apartment’s self-destruct mechanism, blasting Chuck and his weapons into the street. He wakes up in a homeless camp, where he learns that the non-Trampire homeless of Los Angeles are aware of the monsters. Thanks to a crude drawing found by a man known as “The Wise One,” they believe Chuck is the chosen one destined to defeat the Master.

Chuck arrives at the circus with the homeless, accompanied by Van Rental for the final confrontation. A fierce battle ensues, decimating most of the Trampires, until Cular unveils her true form—a colossal, gargoyle-like creature with grotesque features and a massive womb that ensnares victims with a giant tentacle. She captures the Governor, who unexpectedly reveals himself as an Illuminati Lizard, leading to a clash between the two. Amid the turmoil, Chuck transforms into a Trampire, but manages to revert to human form using his ex-wife’s crucifix necklace. Together, he and Van Rental defeat the Master through a combination of wooden-tipped bullets, Holy Coffee, and forcing the crucifix down her throat, though her liver remains intact. As Chuck battles the Governor, Van Rental destroys the Master’s liver, killing them both. Later, Steel reunites with his ex-wife and discovers that the break-up letter was written by the clown she left him for. She still loves him, but cannot be with him because he isn't a clown.

Exiting the circus, Van Rental warns of other creatures still at large, prompting Chuck to ask, “Face or balls?” (In reference to his next punch.)

== Voice cast ==
- Mike Mort as Chuck Steel, Jack Schitt, Van Rental and Maloney
- Jennifer Saunders as Dr. Alex Cular
- Paul Whitehouse as Gussman and Barney
- Dan Russell as Governor, Stretch, Chosen One and Mr. Brownlow
- Samantha Coughlan as Lucy Steel and Mrs. Brownlow
- Jonnie Fiori as Dora

== Production ==
The film was Mike Mort's feature debut, having only previously made short films. He wrote the first early draft for the film in 2001. For the film, Animortal Studio created 425 puppets in order to represent hundreds of different characters and creatures, and dozens of giant scale-model sets. The stop-motion content was shot at 24 frames per second instead of the standard 12. The budget was purportedly $20 million.

== Release and reception ==
The film had its premiere at the Annecy International Animation Film Festival in France on 12 June 2018. It was also premiered at Screamfest in Los Angeles (USA) in October 2018 as well as Fantasia, Montreal (Canada) and at London Frightfest (UK), and other film festivals and competitions.

On review aggregator Rotten Tomatoes, the film holds an approval rating of 91% based on 11 reviews.

The film was nominated for Best Feature Length Film in the Anima't awards category at the Sitges Catalonian International Film Festival. Paul Whitehouse and Jennifer Saunders were nominated for Best Performance in an Animation Film at the UK National Film Awards. The film won the Guru Audience Award for Best Action Film at Fantasia Festival 2018.
