= The History of Rock with Chris Langham =

The History of Rock with Chris Langham is a BBC radio comedy broadcast in the United Kingdom in 1984. It was narrated by Chris Langham, and was broadcast as three half-hour episodes.

Across the three episodes the show documented the progression of rock music in a comedic manner, detailing fictional stories about famous musicians and the way rock music evolved through the twentieth century. Langham's narration let the story unfold, and there were frequent impersonations of rock stars and their songs, parodying the styles of artists such as Elvis Presley and The Beatles.

As well as Langham, the show was voiced by Mark Arden, Janice Kramer, Steve Frost and Philip Pope (the latter of whom collaborated with Steve Brown in writing and performing the musical material). It was written by Roger Planer with additional material from Mark Smith and Arnold Brown, and produced by Jamie Rix.
