= Ted and Ralph =

British TV characters, created 1994

Ted and Ralph are fictional characters created by Arthur Mathews and Graham Linehan, played by Paul Whitehouse and Charlie Higson in the BBC comedy sketch show The Fast Show. They featured in all three series of the show.

== Characters ==
Lord Ralph Mayhew (Higson) is an impoverished aristocrat in his early 30s who lives in his family mansion on an expansive country estate. He has never married or had children and is secretly in love with Ted. Ralph is painfully shy and reserved, occasionally hinted to have previously suffered from mental illness. The juxtaposition of Ralph's over-friendliness and Ted's embarrassed silence forms the basis for the humour in the sketches. Other characters, when seen, particularly Ted's fellow estate workers, seem aware of Ralph's sexuality and are uncomfortable in his presence, or make blatantly homophobic double-entendres, which Ralph always misses.

Ted (Whitehouse) is an Irish groundsman who had worked for Lord Mayhew's late mother and father before Ralph inherited the estate. Though generally very quiet, Ted is wiser than he seems and occasionally profound: Ralph sees through Ted's social status and takes his opinion very seriously. Ted's affection for Ralph, although usually well-hidden, is obvious. He never joins in making fun of him with his mates and on one occasion defends him when a friend makes a joke that refers to Ralph's feelings for him. Ted seems to want to protect Ralph's innocence, not letting his friends shoot Ralph's deer because he "likes to see them wandering about". Ted's wife Esther, often referred to as "Mrs. Ted", is unseen (except in the prequel special). Her unexpected death is the basis of an episode at the end of the third series. Ted's relationship with her seemed more familiar and comfortable than passionate, although he is affected badly by her death.

== Concept and creation ==
Ralph was inspired by a documentary about film director John Boorman where he struggled to converse with his Irish gamekeeper.

Linehan and Mathews pitched Ted and Ralph to Whitehouse in a pub by reading out the early sketch where Ralph invites Ted to a Tina Turner concert. Whitehouse responded by standing and performing Ted's part, adopting an Irish accent in imitation of Linehan (and despite the latter's protestations).

== Sketches ==
The sketches often follow a familiar pattern: Ted is working on the estate, Ralph approaches him nervously and tries to strike up a conversation, culminating in a request for Ted to spend time with him ("Are you interested in French cinema, at all, Ted?") and Ted gently turning him down usually citing a problem with "the drainage in the lower field".

Ralph is extremely nervous around Ted, with the two never making eye contact. Ralph often rambles on in monologues of unconnected topics. As the show progresses the two appear to develop a closer relationship, occasionally going fishing together and sharing more personal conversations. In one sketch Ralph steps in to defend Ted from the offensive slurs made by one of his upper-class friends.

While Ted and his friends are playing a pub drinking game in which each spoken word must be preceded by a vegetable, Ralph, pressured into following the rules of the game, has to deliver the news to Ted that his wife has died, by saying: "Tomato - Ted - aubergine - your - potato - wife's - turnip - dead." One of Higson's favourite sketches, it proved to be "a nightmare to film", and the script was so difficult to follow that the director eventually had to film the sketch one vegetable word at a time.

Ted's wife had requested that Always on My Mind be played at her funeral: as the cassette player fails, Ralph sings it. After the funeral, Ted tries to maintain his sober and collected attitude, but in a rare moment of raw emotion as they walk back to the estate, Ted stumbles and is supported by Ralph.

In the series three finale, Ralph, struggling to express his feelings with Ted while "having a fun drink" at the pub, eventually finds an expressive outlet through a drunken, impassioned karaoke performance of Burning Love, performed in front of Ted and his mates. The sketch ends with a dream sequence by Ralph in which they are joyously romping through a field.

== Prequel special ==
Ted and Ralph were the first characters to have their own spin-off show in the form of a made-for-television Christmas special in December 1998. Ralph discovers at the office of his lawyer, Rowley Birkin (Whitehouse), that he must marry before the age of 35 or lose the estate, and therefore seeks a wife. He falls for Wendy (Saskia Wickham) and proposes, but Ted discovers that Wendy's brother Cliff Carter (Simon Day) has set up the marriage to gain control of the estate, and tries to save Ralph from the marriage.

The film expands on Ralph's difficult childhood through flashbacks. With a strict father (Higson), a thoughtless mother (Arabella Weir), and the deranged, grotesque Aunt Cecilia (Higson), only Ted had time for young Ralph.

It is the first time, it appears, that we start to see Ted realising that he may be in love with Ralph. He is deeply hurt and jealous when Ralph starts to spend less time with him and obsessively observes Ralph's relationship with Wendy. Despite Ralph's rejection, however, Ted still passionately defends him, bitterly accusing Wendy: "You've beguiled a kind, gentle, innocent, albeit slightly foolish man. You've taken away his hopes, his dreams, his past. Not to mention the lower field." At the end of the film, however, Wendy redeems herself, leaving before signing the documents that would turn the estate over to her and her brother. It appears that she also has realised how Ted and Ralph feel about each other, saying to Ted, "This house belongs to him. And to you." and "I didn't know it would be like this. I didn't know he was ...", presumably hinting at Ralph's sexuality. Gripping Ted's hands, while looking meaningfully into his eyes, she says, "He doesn't know what he wants Ted, but it isn't me."

As this is a prequel, Ted's wife Esther (Kathy Burke), unseen and eventually deceased in the Fast Show timeline, also appears on screen for the first and only time.

Reviews were mixed.
