= Posh Nosh =

- Genre: Parody
- Written by: Jon Canter; Arabella Weir
- Directed by: Chris Langham
- Starring: Arabella Weir; Richard E. Grant
- Voices of: Joanna Lumley
- Opening theme: "The Raggle Taggle Gypsy"
- Ending theme: (same)
- Country of origin: United Kingdom
- Original language: English
- No. of seasons: 1
- No. of episodes: 8

Production
- Executive producer: Sophie Clarke-Jevoise
- Producer: Gareth Edwards
- Cinematography: Mike Radford
- Editor: Siencyn Langham
- Running time: 9 minutes (approx.)

Original release
- Network: BBC Two
- Release: 4 February – 22 April 2003

Posh Nosh is a British television programme that parodies television chefs; the title and outline are references to a cooking show pilot pitched by Neil and Christine Hamilton. Written by Jon Canter and Arabella Weir from an idea by Weir, and directed and script edited by Chris Langham, the programme stars Arabella Weir and Richard E. Grant as chefs the Hon. Simon and Minty Marchmont, owners of a very posh restaurant called the Quill & Tassel. Airing from February to April 2003, there were eight nine-minute episodes, in which the chefs carry out their mission to bring extraordinary food to ordinary people.

Simon and Minty prepare various dishes, offering snooty and frequently surreal commentary along the way. They often employ very specific emphasis on certain words in the titles of their dishes, ranging from architect's fish and chips to bread and butter pudding; they also frequently emphasize the provenance or purity of their ingredients, such as "organic unsalted organic butter". They employ words in odd ways in parody of specific culinary terminology, such as interrogate a lemon (rather than simply squeezing it); and their cooked vegetables are not peeled but embarrassed, after which they might be annoyed or disappointed instead of boiled or poached. They also frequently insist on ultra-specific, often prohibitively expensive or non-existent, ingredients, such as Greek currants that are only found in Greece.

At the same time, a thread of increasing domestic tension (and often hostility) runs beneath the surface of every exchange between Simon and Minty, like Simon frequently rolling his eyes at Minty's malapropisms or Simon sarcastically commenting on Minty's cooking skills, along with some not-so-subtle hints about Simon's repressed sexual orientation. The couple illustrate aspects of the British class divide, with Minty as a middle-class social climber who married Simon for his status. She constantly brags about her high station in life, while also seeming to run the Quill and Tassel's kitchens single-handed. A running joke in the series is Simon's crush on his tennis instructor José Luis (David Tennant). José Luis dies before episode eight, and Simon and Minty cook a meal to remember him in this episode. At the dinner, Simon is introduced to a new tennis coach, also played by David Tennant. Both Marchmonts are obsessed with their dog, Sam, going so far as to throw a birthday party (complete with other dog guests) for him. The birthday cake prepared for the party contains huge amounts of chocolate, which can make dogs extremely sick—a rather macabre joke.

The common use of websites in television programmes is often spoofed as well, with items such as www.sexmexavocado.com and www.arthurleggbourkersfarmnearbanbury.co.uk appearing as subtitles on screen.

Finally, each episode concludes with teaser for the next episode and a short faux promotional piece for a jar of something from the Posh Nosh range at your local purveyor of all foods fine and extraordinary. Each item on offer is progressively more ridiculous. For example, here is the close from the episode about architect's fish and chips (as distinct from builder's fish and chips):

- Minty: Join us next week on Posh Nosh, when I'll be disabling a partridge in its own jus.
- (closing theme as the credits slide by, right to left, very quickly)
- (pause at the end of the third line)
- Promo: From the Posh Nosh range, dried John Dory thins in basil aioli.
- (last line of closing theme)

The voiceover for these promotionals is performed by Joanna Lumley.

Episodes are available on YouTube in low quality.

== Theme song ==
The arty and refined opening and closing theme for Posh Nosh is taken from the traditional Scottish ballad "The Raggle Taggle Gypsies", in a 1956 recording by countertenor Alfred Deller to guitar accompaniment by Desmond Dupré. It uses the following verses from the ballad:

Opening theme:
What care I for my house and my land?
What care I for my treasure, O?
What care I for my new-wedded lord,
I'm off with the raggle taggle gipsies, O!

Closing theme:
What care I for a goose feather bed
With the sheet turned down so bravely, O?
For tonight I shall sleep in a cold open field,
[Faux promo for Posh Nosh range product inserted here]
Along with the raggle taggle gipsies, O!

== Episodes ==
1. "Architect's Fish and Chips"
2. "Birthday Parties"
3. "Paella"
4. "Beautiful Food"
5. "Bread and Butter Pudding"
6. "Leftovers"
7. "Sauces"
8. "Comfort Food"
