= Chris Langham =

English writer, actor and comedian (1949–2026)

- Born: Christopher Langham; 14 April 1949; London, England
- Died: 24 June 2026 (aged 77)
- Education: St Paul's School
- Occupations: Actor; comedian; writer
- Years active: 1973–2026
- Spouse(s): Sue Jones-Davies (divorced); Christine Cartwright
- Children: 5
- Parents: Michael Langham (father); Helen Burns (mother)

Christopher Langham (14 April 1949 – 24 June 2026) was an English writer, actor and comedian. He was known for playing the cabinet minister Hugh Abbot in the BBC sitcom The Thick of It, and as presenter Roy Mallard in People Like Us, first on BBC Radio 4 and later on its transfer to television on BBC Two, where Mallard is almost entirely an unseen character. He is also known for his roles in the television series Not the Nine O'Clock News, Help, and Kiss Me Kate, and as the gatehouse guard in Chelmsford 123. In 2006, he won BAFTA awards for The Thick of It and Help.

On 2 August 2007, Langham was found guilty of 15 charges of downloading and possessing level 5 child pornography. Langham was jailed for 10 months, which was later reduced to six months on appeal. He was made to sign the sex offenders' register and was banned from working with children for 10 years.

== Early life and education ==
Christopher Langham was born on 14 April 1949. He was the son of theatre director Michael Langham and actress Helen Burns. He was born in London and educated at St Paul's School, an independent school for boys, then located in Hammersmith in West London, followed by the University of Bristol, where he studied English and drama, dropping out after suffering a nervous breakdown when his parents split up.

== Early breakthrough and career ==
Langham began performing comedy and writing for Spike Milligan. At the suggestion of John Cleese, Jerry Juhl, the head writer of The Muppet Show, contacted Langham and asked if he would be interested in writing some sample segments for the show. Langham wrote three short segments—an "At The Dance" bit, a monologue for Fozzie Bear, and a backstage story for an episode. He further contributed to an episode featuring Petula Clark before he was hired a full-time member of the writing staff for the third and fourth seasons of The Muppet Show.

Langham also appeared as the "special guest star" in the 19th episode of the final season, when the scheduled guest, Richard Pryor, was unable to attend after he had incurred injuries during a freebasing binge. He was awarded a Primetime Emmy Award for Outstanding Writing for a Comedy Series for the Carol Burnett episode, along with Juhl and David Odell. Langham next co-wrote the script for the 1981 television special The Muppets Go to the Movies. He also made a brief appearance as a police driver in The Pink Panther Strikes Again in 1976, opposite Peter Sellers.

Also in 1976 was the inception, at the Science Fiction Theatre of Liverpool, of the nine-hour stage play Illuminatus, which Langham co-wrote with Ken Campbell. In 1977, the production transferred to the Cottesloe Theatre, London, where he took the part of George Dorn, giving a performance which Peter Hall found "extremely impressive".

He was part of the original cast for the pilot for Not the Nine O'Clock News in 1979, written by Richard Curtis. Even after the original pilot was pulled from the schedules, Langham was retained for the first full series, billed equally with the then-unknown Mel Smith, Pamela Stephenson and Rowan Atkinson. The first series did not rate as well as hoped, however, and Langham was felt to be "too independent a spirit".

Langham went on to appear on Smith and Jones's own programme, Alas Smith and Jones, playing an ineffectual host in a spoof of the then well known live TV discussion programme After Dark. This character apparently inspired John Morton to create the character of Roy Mallard, who was later to feature in his show People Like Us; Mallard was played both on radio and (off-screen) on television by Langham. Langham also played a fly-on-the-wall documentary interviewer very similar to Roy Mallard in Happy Families in 1985.

Also in 1979, Langham played Arthur Dent in the first professional stage version of The Hitchhiker's Guide to the Galaxy, directed by Ken Campbell and staged at the Institute of Contemporary Arts. He later returned to Hitchhiker's, appearing as Prak in Above The Title Productions' Tertiary Phase radio series in 2004.

Langham appeared in the 1979 film, Monty Python's Life of Brian, as one of the Roman soldiers unable to keep a straight face in the 'Biggus Dickus' scene. He appears in the cast list as "Alfonso, Giggling Guard".

He narrated the 1984 radio series The History of Rock with Chris Langham, in which Langham gave a comedic and somewhat fictitious account of the history of rock music. On 14 November 1985, Langham appeared as the narrator/reporter in "Roxanne", episode five of the BBC situation comedy Happy Families, written by Ben Elton. In 1992, he appeared in the film Carry On Columbus.

In addition to several one-man shows, Langham's stage credits includes Les Misérables, in which he played Thénardier in 1996; Crazy for You, for which he received an Olivier nomination; The Way of the World, The Nerd and The Pirates of Penzance. He created the comic role of the assassin in Blondel (co-starring Paul Nicholas; by Tim Rice and Stephen Oliver), and appears on the original cast album.

== Later career ==
Langham wrote the BBC One sitcom Kiss Me Kate, in which he appeared alongside Caroline Quentin and Amanda Holden. In 2002, he wrote and starred in Bradford in My Dreams, an adaptation of a short story by Lawrence Block for the BBC Three series Spine Chillers. On Radio 4, he narrated the series The Rapid Eye Movement, which starred Martin Freeman as Chester Beatty, in whose head the entire series took place. In 2003, he directed the BBC TV comedy series Posh Nosh.

In 2003 and 2005, respectively, Langham portrayed authors George Orwell and John Wyndham in the BBC docudrama George Orwell – A Life in Pictures and the BBC Four documentary John Wyndham: the Invisible Man of Science Fiction. He also appeared in the radio magazine satire The Sunday Format.

He was the narrator for the storypeople segments on the children's TV show Boohbah which aired on ITV from 2003 to 2006.

Langham starred alongside co-writer Paul Whitehouse in Help on BBC Two in 2005, where he also appeared in the Armando Iannucci comedy The Thick of It in the same year. Langham was named Best Comedy Actor in the 2005 British Comedy Awards and won the 2006 BAFTA Best Comedy Performance award for his role in The Thick of It. In November 2005, Langham wrote and starred in ITV pilot Seven Second Delay.

He was a frequent guest on The Heaven and Earth Show. He was part of the writing team for Bremner, Bird and Fortune, in which he occasionally appeared as a civil servant discussing things with Bremner's Tony Blair. Langham also appeared as a panellist on the Radio 4 show Armando Iannucci's Charm Offensive.

== Arrest and conviction ==
On 29 November 2005, Langham was arrested by Kent Police in connection with Operation Ore, a British police operation into credit-card customers paying to access indecent and abusive images of children on the internet. The arrest was first reported in the press on 16 December 2005, in response to which Langham's lawyer read a statement saying he was innocent and pointing out he had not been charged. On 11 May 2006, he was charged with 15 counts of downloading indecent images of children.

The trial took place at Maidstone Crown Court during July and August 2007. Part of Langham's defence to these charges in court was that they were research on a peeping tom character Pedro for a television comedy. Langham's former Help co-star/writer Paul Whitehouse confirmed the character was referred to as a "peeping Tom" prone to highly dubious sexual behaviour, but stated that the character was not intended to be a paedophile, nor was he aware of Langham obtaining such material for the development of the programme's script. The prosecutor, Richard Barraclough QC, asked Whitehouse, "Did Mr Langham ever discuss with you that he was undertaking any research for the shows?" "Not to my knowledge, no," Whitehouse replied. Langham also said in court he had been sexually abused as a child and this caused him to look for images; Barraclough called this "pseudo-psychobabble" and the judge dismissed its legality as a defence. Langham had paid with his credit card for access to a site entitled "European Lolita Sex" in 1999. On the evening that the public was made aware of the scope of Operation Ore, Langham had contacted police to report his "concern" about spam emails, with links to child pornography sites, which he said he was receiving. The prosecution said that he had contacted police because he had "panicked" and "wanted to give the impression of being a good citizen".

During his trial, he was also accused of having sex with an under-age girl in upmarket hotels, his West End dressing room, his car, and his home. The accuser claimed this had started when she was 14 years old. Langham denied the charges and claimed he had only had sex with her when she was 18. He was found not guilty of six counts of indecent assault and two counts of buggery between January 1996 and April 2000.

On 2 August 2007, Langham was convicted on charges of downloading child sexual abuse images and videos. He was sentenced to 10 months in prison and was placed on the sexual offenders register for 10 years. Before sentencing, the judge said that "some of the children viewed are clearly prepubescent... The worst video was 15 minutes long and it showed in quite graphic detail the sadistic brutalisation of an eight-year-old girl in the UK, with some serious sexual offences against her".

Langham was released on 14 November 2007, after his sentence was reduced to six months on appeal. Dame Heather Steel, who gave the decision, said that the court viewed Langham's explanation that he viewed the child sexual abuse images for research as "highly improbable", but could not reject it, although he was still guilty of encouraging "despicable acts" through downloading the images of child sexual abuse. On his release, Langham stated, "My life has been ruined, but my conscience is clear" and complained that the media "completely ignored" the court's "acceptance based upon all the evidence and expert opinion that I have no sexual interest in children". Despite this, after the trial, Detective Superintendent Paul Fotheringham of Kent Police continued to insist to journalists, "Langham doesn’t like the label, but I am satisfied that he is a paedophile".

== Career after release ==
A few days after his release from prison in 2008, Langham was interviewed by celebrity psychologist Pamela Connolly (née Stephenson), with whom he had worked on Not the Nine O'Clock News, for her UK television series Shrink Rap, where he revealed that he was sexually abused when he was eight years old, events which he said led to his trial and conviction. The interview was broadcast on More4 on 15 January 2008. Langham was also invited to make a speech in front of the Oxford Union on 29 May 2008, but the invitation was withdrawn.

Following his arrest, Langham said his life had "completely fallen apart": "Offers of work have almost entirely disappeared, at a time when I was looking forward to something of a golden year." In a later interview with The Guardian in September 2011, Langham stated that many people had suggested to him that he should work again, but no one wanted to employ him.

In 2011, in his first screen appearance after his release, he was cast as the lead in Black Pond, a low-budget British film directed by Tom Kingsley and Will Sharpe. The Kino Digital cinema in Hawkhurst had a screening of the film on 11 December 2011. Afterwards, Langham, who lived nearby, held a brief question-and-answer session to help promote the film.

In 2012, he appeared with Billy Murray, Leslie Grantham, and Crissy Rock in Richard John Taylor's drama film Acceptance. In 2020, the film was re-released as Vengeance.

Langham's The Muppet Show episode was not made available on Disney+ when the series was added to the streaming service in 2021. Disney stated that most missing episodes and segments were due to music-rights issues, but refused to comment on Langham in particular.

== Personal life and death ==
Langham's first marriage, to actress, singer and local politician Sue Jones-Davies, produced three children, but broke up, by his own admission, due to his alcoholism. Langham had two children by his second wife, director Christine Cartwright. As of 2011, Langham lived with his wife and two children in Cranbrook, Kent.

He sought counselling for alcohol and cocaine addiction, and was still undergoing therapy once a week as of 2006. He used his experiences to co-write the BBC Two series Help, in which he portrayed a psychotherapist, with friend Paul Whitehouse, and played a counsellor in the sitcom Kiss Me Kate.

Langham died from pancreatic cancer on 24 June 2026, aged 77; his death was announced on 3 September.
