= Down the Line (radio series) =

- Cover of audio recording of Down the Line
- Genre: Spoof phone-in show
- Running time: 30 minutes
- Country of origin: United Kingdom
- Language: English
- Home station: BBC Radio 4
- TV adaptations: Bellamy's People
- Hosted by: "Gary Bellamy" (Rhys Thomas)
- Starring: Amelia Bullmore; Simon Day; Felix Dexter; Charlie Higson; Lucy Montgomery; Paul Whitehouse; Rhys Thomas
- Written by: Charlie Higson, Paul Whitehouse
- Produced by: Charlie Higson, Paul Whitehouse
- Executive producers: Lucy Armitage – Series 1 & 2
- Edited by: Tom Jenkins
- Original release: 2 May 2006 – 23 June 2013
- No. of series: 5
- No. of episodes: 29 + 4 specials
- Website: Down the Line homepage

Down the Line is a British radio comedy broadcast on BBC Radio 4, which satirises popular radio phone-in shows. The show, hosted by "Gary Bellamy" (Rhys Thomas), is semi-improvised and is written and performed in a style of heightened realism.

== Overview ==
Down the Line was first broadcast in May 2006. The pre-show publicity did not indicate that the show was a pre-recorded comedy, describing it as a live phone-in featuring "award winning" DJ Gary Bellamy, and led to many complaints from listeners who apparently failed to spot it was a spoof, generating considerable publicity for the programme. It was subsequently revealed that the show is written and performed by several familiar figures in British comedy, including Paul Whitehouse and Charlie Higson.

Regular 'callers' include:

- Christopher Nibbs (Charlie Higson) from Pevensey Bay; a jokey character who refers to himself in the third person as 'Nibbsy' or 'The Nibbster'. Bellamy finds him amusing.
- Khalid, (Paul Whitehouse) who only repeats topics of the show followed by the phrase 'what is point?' and responds to any subsequent remarks by Gary with the same question. Bellamy's attitude changes towards him as the series progresses.
- The Pearly King, (Simon Day) a cheery cockney who talks about the 'pearly way'.
- Humphrey Milner, (Charlie Higson) an elderly gentleman who uses endless examples to illustrate his point.
- Graham Downs, (Paul Whitehouse) a morbidly obese man who has a sinus problem and is an archetypal loser. Often says he would "really like to get married".
- Chuck Perry, (Paul Whitehouse) who laughs continuously and maniacally at his own feeble jokes and most other things.
- The military man (Paul Whitehouse) (who gives the alias Clive Russetter in Series 1 Ep 5) responds to every topic stating that he is from a military background and that he would drive a van packed with explosives into the "issue" - be it education or global warming.
- Early D (Felix Dexter) begins his calls speaking with a very 'street' sounding "Jafaican" accent which gradually morphs into full-blown, barely decipherable Jamaican dialect. Bellamy never seems to notice.
- Colin Williamson, who confesses to be a computer expert and general technology buff, viewing most conventional ways of doing things as "antiquated" but whose technical knowledge usually turns out to be useless.
- Adam Frankel from Basingstoke, (Dave Cummings) who will phone in to comment on a subject to insist things were fine as they were and "Why must they keep mucking about with everything? (also called 'Dave from Crawley' in later series).

Recording for the third series commenced on Monday 12 November 2007 and transmission began on 10 January 2008.

A television spinoff on BBC Two was announced on 2 April 2009. in which Gary Bellamy goes to the streets of the UK to meet 'real' people and get their opinions on a wide range of topics. The series is entitled Bellamy's People and was inspired by "all the television series of 'famous people exploring Britain' that have been made over the last few years". The series features improvisation by the cast.

== Series 1 ==
No. in series	Subject	Original release date
1	"Freedom of speech"	2 May 2006
The episode discusses whether free speech is acceptable or not as it may offend. However, there are a large number of callers who discuss parking restrictions in their town instead.
2	"Religion and the decline in Anglican congregations"	9 May 2006
The episode discusses whether God is real or not and what is acceptable to say about religion. It also asks the listeners for the name of a new primary colour found by Koreans.
3	"Animals at war"	16 May 2006
4	"Crime"	23 May 2006
5	"Healthy eating"	30 May 2006
6	"Equality and why men won't go to the doctors"	6 June 2006

== Series 2 ==
A second series started on 16 January 2007 for another 6-week run until 20 February 2007. "Guests" this series includes characters played by: Paul Whitehouse, Charlie Higson, Simon Day, Lucy Montgomery, Amelia Bullmore, Matt Lucas, Felix Dexter, Mark Gatiss, Catherine Tate, Arabella Weir, Robert Popper, Louis Vause, Simon Godley, Phoebe Higson, Sam Ward, Dave Cummings, and Fiona Whitehouse.

No. in series	Subject	Original release date
1	"War and Chocolate"	16 January 2007
2	"Bullying and Property Sales"	23 January 2007
3	"Immigration and Love"	30 January 2007
4	"Plastic Surgery and Natural Disasters"	6 February 2007
5	"Global Warming"	13 February 2007
6	"Education and Ghosts"	20 February 2007

== Series 3 ==
Series 3 of Down The Line started its run on Thursday 10 January 2008, according to trailers broadcast in the preceding weeks. One trailer referred to the show as "DTL", spoofing BBC radio's tendency to call long-running programmes by their acronyms (as in 'FOOC' – From Our Own Correspondent, "WATO" – The World at One, etc.). "Guests" this series were played by Paul Whitehouse, Charlie Higson, Lucy Montgomery, Amelia Bullmore, Simon Day, Felix Dexter, Dave Cummings, Louis Vause, Matt Lucas, Lee Mack and Omid Djalili.

No. in series	Subject	Original release date
1	"Liberal Agenda of Media"	10 January 2008
2	"String Theory and Popular Science Fiction"	17 January 2008
3	"Communications and Technology"	24 January 2008
4	"The Elderly, Consumer Rights and The Countryside"	31 January 2008
5	"Olympics and Can We Trust the Media?"	7 February 2008
6	"Bad Manners and Modern Liberal Parenting"	14 February 2008

== Series 4 ==
Recording for a fourth series of Down The Line commenced in January 2011. "Guests" this series includes characters played by: Paul Whitehouse, Charlie Higson, Simon Day, Lucy Montgomery, Amelia Bullmore, Felix Dexter, Arabella Weir, Robert Popper, Adil Ray (who becomes a regular cast member from this series onwards), Rosie Cavaliero, Kevin Eldon, Julia Davis, Lee Mack, Louis Vause, Dave Cummings, and Fiona Whitehouse. The seven-episode series commenced broadcast on Tuesday 15 March 2011 at 6.30pm.

No. in series	Subject	Original release date
1	"Coalition Government"	15 March 2011
2	"Fertility, Death and James Bond"	22 March 2011
3	"Poetry"	29 March 2011
4	"Male and Female Sexuality"	5 April 2011
5	"Alcohol, Drugs and 50 Ways to Leave Your Lover"	12 April 2011
6	"TV Chefs and Astronomy"	19 April 2011
7	"Conspiracy Theories and Are We Mollycoddling Our Children?"	26 April 2011

== Series 5 ==
Series 5 began broadcast on 1 May 2013, and consists of 4 episodes

No. in series	Subject	Original release date
1	"Horse Meat and Background Music"	1 May 2013
2	"Death of the High Street and British Wildlife"	8 May 2013
3	"Gay Marriage and Hothousing"	15 May 2013
4	"Europe and Fracking"	22 May 2013

== One-off editions ==
No. in series	Subject	Original release date
1	"Tony Blair Special"	27 June 2007
2	"Credit Crunch Special"	21 April 2009
3	"Olympic Legacy Special"	23 June 2013
4	"A Tribute to Felix Dexter"	23 December 2013
5	"Lockdown Special"	14 May 2020
6	"Lockdown Special – Sounds Exclusive"	14 May 2020
