= Richard John Taylor =

British film editor (born 1985)

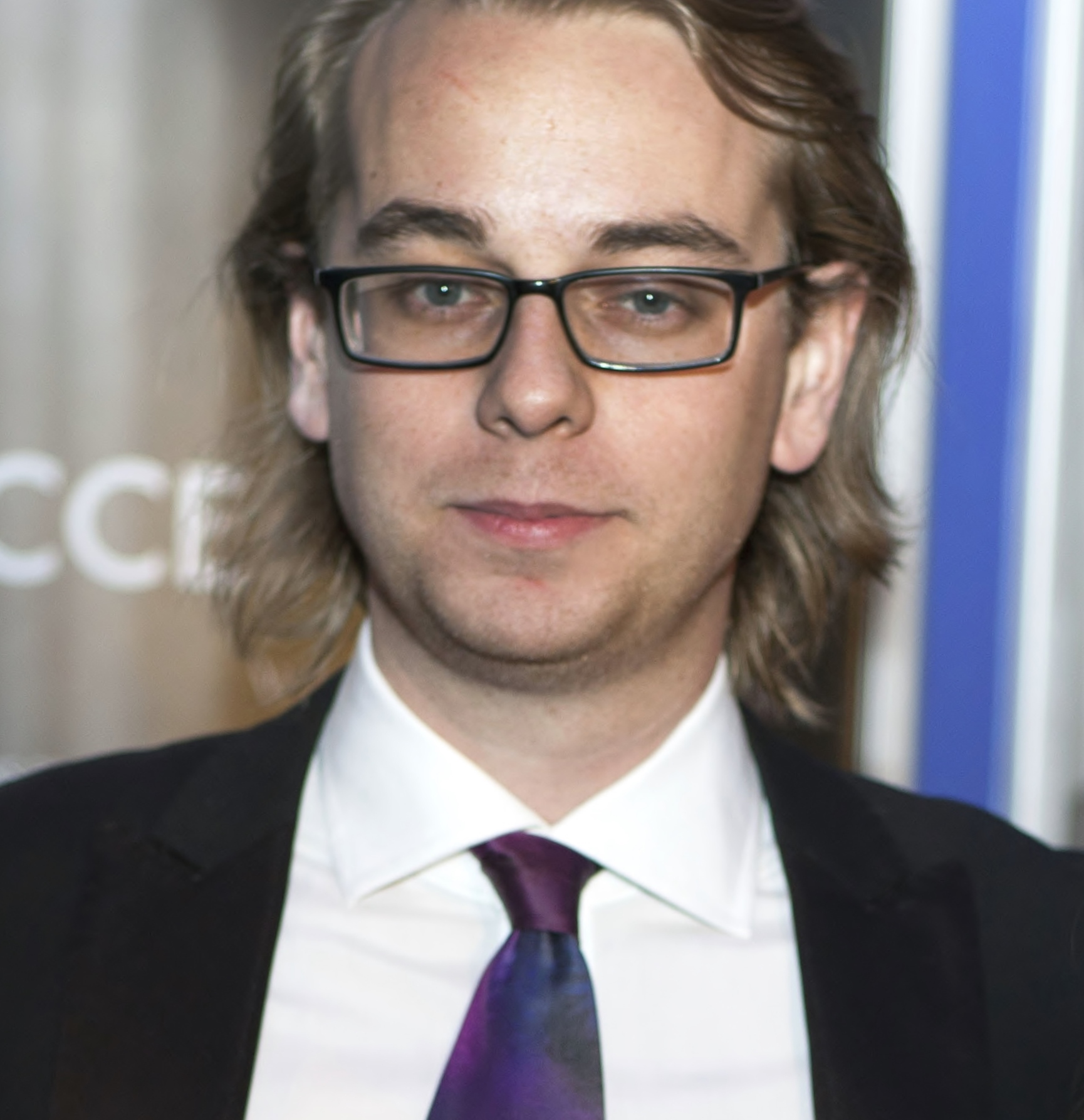
face of Richard John Taylor

Meredith Alfred Lytton (born 15 June 1985), known professionally as Richard John Taylor, is a British filmmaker, author, restaurateur and accused conman.

== Career ==
In 2011, Taylor formed Princess Films with the goal of producing "hard hitting and thought provoking" documentaries. His first film was I Want To Talk About It, a documentary looking at the effects of rape, fronted by actress Louisa Lytton.

In 2012 the company moved on to feature films, the first being Fifteen starring Nicholas Ball. He later wrote and directed Acceptance with Billy Murray, Leslie Grantham, Crissy Rock and Chris Langham.

He worked with Grantham on two more films, a short entitled Leslie in which Grantham plays a fictionalised version of himself and the feature The Factory which was loosely inspired by the Roald Dahl novel Charlie and the Chocolate Factory and the life of the actor Gene Wilder. Langham also makes an appearance in The Factory as the lead character's family doctor.

In March 2014, Simon Hattenstone wrote an article in The Guardian, accusing Taylor of having falsified claims in regards to his business associates and defrauded investors. According to the article, Taylor claimed to work for the BBC as chief editor for the television show EastEnders but in fact never worked on the production. The article states the accusations were not pursued or upheld legally, but described Taylor as a "con man" and says none of his films have "gained a distribution deal" and that "None of the films, which were made cheaply and very fast, has ever been broadcast". Hattenstone suggests that Taylor lied to and financially exploited a woman who had been the victim of sexual abuse.

In February 2018, he wrote and directed The Krays: Dead Man Walking starring Marc Pickering and EastEnders actors Rita Simons, Leslie Grantham, Chris Ellison and Nicholas Ball. Released by Sony Pictures on 10 September 2018, it was the biggest first week on DVD of any non-theatrical British film that year. In November 2019, Dread Central announced that due to the commercial success of the film, Taylor would return to direct a sequel titled The Krays: New Blood. The article also stated that Taylor was working on a memoir about the life of Leslie Grantham, who died in 2018.

In October 2018, he wrote, edited, produced and directed Muse, a psychological horror starring Nicholas Ball. The script was first conceived as a vehicle for Leslie Grantham, who remained onboard as producer, making the film his last official screen credit. Muse was released on 8 March 2019 on Amazon Prime in the US and UK. Taylor was awarded 'Best Cinematography' at the 2019 London International Motion Picture Awards for his work on the film.

In March 2020, an article on Dread Central released news that Taylor's production company Hello Princess was at the pre-production stage with six horror films. ‘The Disappearance of Little Lottie, The Huntress of Auschwitz, Man Eater, The Butcher Baker, Actors Vs Zombies, and The Silent Assassin would all be written and directed by Taylor with production starting from summer 2020. The article also stated that Taylor's memoir of Grantham was called Where I'm Going, You Can't Follow.

On 11 August 2020, Taylor was interviewed by Dread Central to celebrate the unveiling of the trailer for his forthcoming film Vengeance starring Billy Murray and Grantham; Vengeance is a re-release of Acceptance. The interview confirmed his production company Hello Princess had moved into pre-production on previously mentioned projects The Huntress of Auschwitz and The Disappearance of Little Lottie while also developing a female-led Dracula project. Taylor said that he had written a children's book, The Loneliest Cow, which was published in 2020.
