= Alwyn Crawshaw =

British artist, writer and broadcaster (1934–2025)

- Born: 20 September 1934; Mirfield, Yorkshire, England
- Died: 10 November 2025 (aged 91); Norfolk, England
- Occupations: Artist, writer and broadcaster
- Known for: Art instruction and television programmes
- Spouse: June Bridgewater
- Children: 3

Alwyn Crawshaw (1934-2025) was an artist, writer and broadcaster who published many books and presented programmes on painting.

== Early life and career ==
Crawshaw was born on 20 September 1934 in Mirfield, Yorkshire, to Fred and Doris, and had a twin sister, Shirley. He wanted to be an artist from a young age, and when the family moved to Hastings when Alwyn was 11, he attended Hastings Grammar School, where his school report reminded him that "there is more to life than art and sport." In 1949, he attended Hastings School of Art along with Shirley, who was also a talented artist.

While doing his National Service with the Army Catering Corps, Crawshaw performed a magic show called "Alwyno the Crazy Magician". Later he worked as a freelance commercial artist and demonstrator in London, and founded an artists' merchandise company in Kingston upon Thames which he ran from 1957 to 1980 and which produced advertising and packaging. During this time, he exhibited his paintings on Bayswater Road. He married June Bridgewater, also an artist, in 1957 and the couple had 3 children.

Crawshaw became vice-president of the National Acrylic Painters` Association soon after its inception in 1986 and took over as president in 1991, a post he held until he died in 2025.

== Publishing, television and cultural impact ==
Crawshaw made several programmes for Channel Four and the BBC, including A Brush with Art (1991), the Painting Challenge (1993) and Crawshaw Paints (1996). He published over twenty books on painting techniques and art instruction.

A character in the comedy sketch show The Fast Show called Johnny Nice Painter was allegedly based on Alwyn Crawshaw. while an article in 'lad mag' Loaded Magazine suggested that his TV programmes were popular with students to wake up to with a hangover.

== Later life and death ==
In August 2017, Alwyn and June hosted an exhibition of their work to celebrate their diamond wedding anniversary. The couple remained married for over 60 years until his death. Alwyn died at his Norfolk home on Monday 10 November 2025, aged 91.
