= Help (British TV series) =

- Genre: Comedy
- Starring: Paul Whitehouse; Chris Langham
- Country of origin: United Kingdom
- Original language: English
- No. of series: 1
- No. of episodes: 6

Production
- Running time: 30 minutes

Original release
- Network: BBC Two
- Release: 27 February – 3 April 2005

Help is a BBC television comedy series first screened on BBC Two in 2005. Written by and starring Paul Whitehouse and Chris Langham, it concerns a psychotherapist Peter Strong (Langham) and his therapy sessions with a variety of patients, almost all of whom are played by Whitehouse.

Strong, the diffident therapist, has an obsession with his receptionist Rebecca (played by Alison King) and also has regular appointments with his own therapist (who is also played by Whitehouse), the only times when the scene leaves Peter's office. Other performers are Mark Williams and Olivia Colman in cameos as patients, Alison Senior as a patient's wife, and Langham's real-life daughter Emily as a patient's precocious daughter. Two of the most frequent patients are Gary (the only role Whitehouse plays with no make-up), who initially uses his therapy sessions to escape from his wife; and Monty, an elderly Jewish taxi-driver whose wife is suffering from Alzheimer's disease. Others include an Eastern European father, a magician and a TV presenter.

Interviewed by Ben Thompson for The Guardian in 2005, Langham said, of his writing partnership with Whitehouse:

The way Paul works is to try and come up with a phrase that suits a particular voice ... That's the grain of sand around which the pearl of a character forms. Once he's found that voice, he's volcanic – it all comes out of him in a stream of consciousness which I can't type fast enough to keep up with. Then my rather less glamorous and exciting job would be to take that stuff and shape it, which was fine by me, as I'm kind of obsessed with structure.

The show was released on Region 4 DVD, but has so far remained unreleased in the UK, most likely as a result of Langham's conviction for possession of child pornography in 2007 and subsequent semi-retirement. He justified viewing the material as being research for the series. The development of peeping tom character Pedro, who would appear in the proposed and ultimately unmade second series, became a focal point of Langham's trial.

== Swedish version ==
A Swedish remake, Hjälp!, was broadcast on Swedish television in 2007–2009. The psychologist Jeanette Plaszczyk was played by Stina Ekblad.
