= Paul Whitehouse =

Welsh comedian (born 1958)

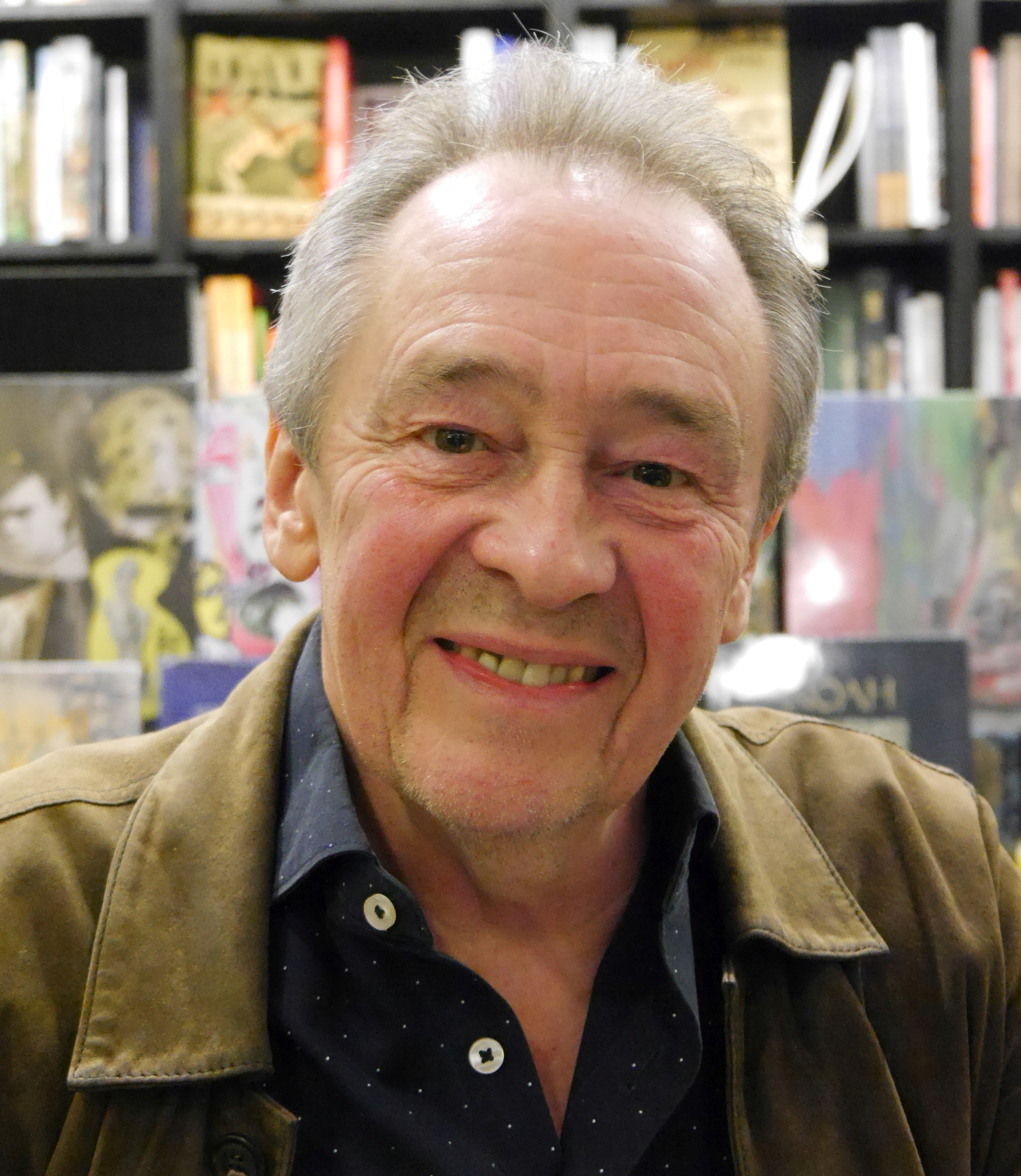
- Whitehouse at Waterstones, London in 2023
- Born: Paul Julian Whitehouse; 17 May 1958 (age 68); Stanleytown, Glamorgan, Wales
- Education: University of East Anglia; dropped out.
- Occupations: Actor; comedian; presenter; producer; screenwriter
- Years active: 1987–present
- Spouses: Fiona Wightman (m. 1992; div. 2003); Mine Conkbayir (m. 2019)
- Children: 4

Paul Julian Whitehouse (born 17 May 1958) is a Welsh actor, comedian, presenter, and writer. He was one of the main stars of the BBC sketch comedy series The Fast Show and has starred with Harry Enfield in the shows Harry & Paul and Harry Enfield & Chums. He has appeared with Bob Mortimer in the BBC series Mortimer & Whitehouse: Gone Fishing and has also acted in films including Corpse Bride (2005), Alice in Wonderland (2010) and The Death of Stalin (2017).

In a 2005 poll to find The Comedian's Comedian, he was in the top 50 comedy acts voted for by comedians and comedy insiders.

== Early life ==
Paul Julian Whitehouse was born on 17 May 1958, in Stanleytown, Glamorgan, Wales. His father, Harry, worked for the National Coal Board and his mother, Anita (née Jones), was a singer with the Welsh National Opera. (Note: In the Christmas 2021 Special edition of Mortimer & Whitehouse: Gone Fishing, Bob Mortimer presents Whitehouse with a recording of his mother, singing with the Welsh National Opera, specially transferred to vinyl.) The family moved to Enfield, Middlesex, when he was four years old, which led to his discovering his talent for mimicry:

At school I didn't say a word for the first four weeks – I called it my Silent Month. I think it was because everyone was speaking so differently from how it had been in Wales. Then, after four weeks, I came home one day and said, 'Muumm, I wanna go to Sarfend!' For her that was the end because I had lost my lovely Welsh lilt. So I became very conscious of speech and the effects it can have. But when I went back to Wales I would start talking all Welsh, 'like that, you see' before going all Alf Garnett while coming back the other way.

== Career ==
Whitehouse attended the University of East Anglia reading for a degree in Development Studies from autumn 1976, where he became friends with Charlie Higson. The pair spent little of their first year studying, instead playing guitar and performing with their punk rock combo, the Right Hand Lovers. Whitehouse dropped out and squatted in a council flat in Hackney, east London and occasionally worked as a plasterer. After Higson graduated in 1980, he moved in with Whitehouse, working by day as a decorator and performing at night and the weekends with his new punk-funk group the Higsons.

The pair began working as tradesmen on a house shared by comedians Stephen Fry and Hugh Laurie, which inspired them to start writing comedy. They moved to an estate where in a pub they met Harry Enfield, a neighbour with a stage act, and after he gained a place on Channel 4's Saturday Live, the pair were invited to write for him. Whitehouse created Enfield's character Stavros (a London-based Greek kebab shop owner), and then Loadsamoney (an archetypal Essex boy made good in Margaret Thatcher's 1980s); he also appeared as Enfield's sidekick Lance on Saturday Live. This success turned Whitehouse and Higson's career, and they began to appear on Vic Reeves Big Night Out and extensively for the BBC, with Whitehouse appearing on A Bit of Fry and Laurie as a man with a clinical need to have his bottom fondled, and Paul Merton: The Series, then on Harry Enfield's Television Programme, where he developed numerous characters including DJ Mike Smash of Smashie and Nicey, alongside Enfield as Dave Nice.

=== Television ===
While watching a preview tape of highlights from Enfield's programme, Whitehouse and Higson were inspired to create a rapid-fire delivery comedy series which would evolve into The Fast Show (when shown in the United States on BBC America, the show was titled Brilliant). Whitehouse's characters included Rowley Birkin QC, Unlucky Alf, Arthur Atkinson, Ron Manager and Ted.

An online series of The Fast Show commissioned by Fosters led to six weekly episodes launched on 10 November 2011.

In 2001 and 2002, Whitehouse and Fast Show collaborator Dave Cummings co-wrote two series of the BBC comedy drama Happiness; Whitehouse also performed the lead role as a voice-over actor with a mid-life crisis.

Whitehouse wrote, produced and appeared with Chris Langham in the 2005 comedy drama Help, also for the BBC. In this series he took 25 roles, all patients of Langham's psychotherapist (except one, who is Langham's psychotherapist's psychotherapist). The pair's collaboration resulted in Whitehouse taking the witness stand on 24 July 2007 in the trial of Langham, in regard to the charge of holding explicit images and videos of minors. Langham claimed he downloaded this material as research for a character in the second series of Help, but Whitehouse's testimony only partially corroborated this explanation.

He appeared in the BBC sketch series Harry & Paul (formerly Ruddy Hell! It's Harry and Paul), starring alongside Harry Enfield. Whitehouse starred alongside Charlie Higson in the BBC2 comedy series Bellamy's People, with the first episode broadcast on 21 January 2010. The comedy evolved from the BBC Radio 4 program Down the Line. The show originally had the working title of Bellamy's Kingdom.

In October 2014, Harry Enfield and Whitehouse revived the classic characters Frank and George ("The Self-Righteous Brothers") from Harry Enfield and Chums, in a sketch for Channel 4's testicular cancer awareness comedy series The Feeling Nuts Comedy Night.

In 2015 his sitcom Nurse, based on his Radio 4 series of the same name (see below), debuted on BBC2 on 10 March.

In August 2015, Whitehouse, alongside Enfield, in celebration of their 25-year partnership, presented An Evening With Harry Enfield and Paul Whitehouse.

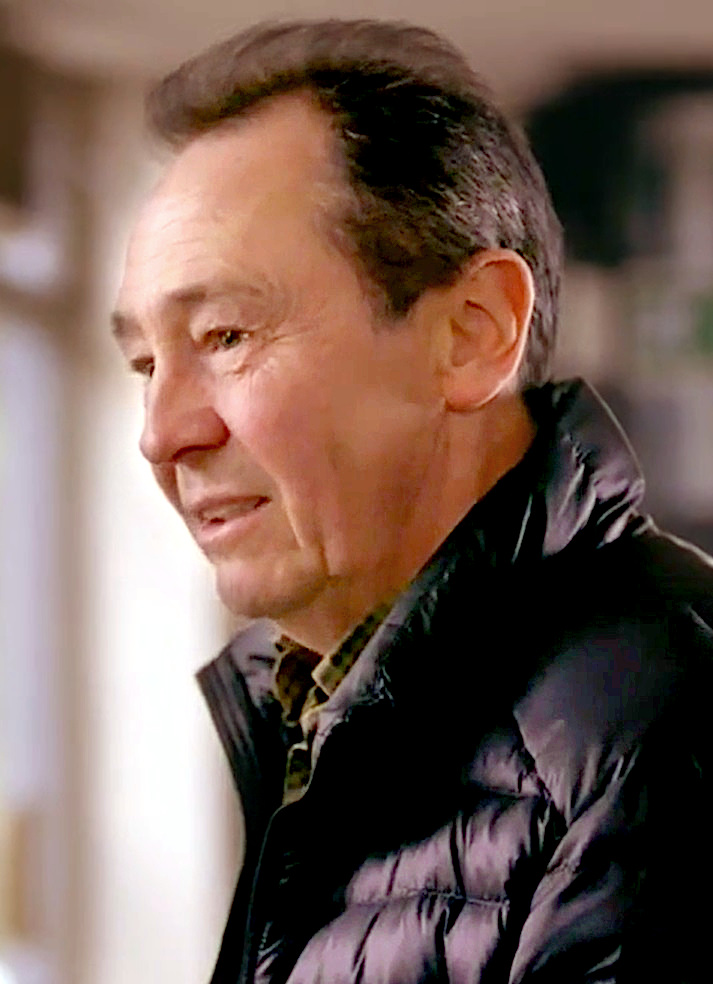
Whitehouse in 2017

In June and July 2018, Whitehouse appeared with his long-time friend and fellow comedian Bob Mortimer in a BBC2 six-part series, Mortimer & Whitehouse: Gone Fishing. The two friends, who both suffer from heart conditions, share their thoughts and experiences while fishing at a variety of locations around the UK, often with anecdotes about Paul's health and Bob's misadventures. The fourth series of Gone Fishing began broadcasting in 2021. The fifth series began in September 2022, and returned for a Christmas special in December 2022. The duo returned for a sixth series broadcast on BBC.

Whitehouse will portray Argus Filch in HBO's television adaptation of the Harry Potter series.

=== Radio ===
Whitehouse and Charlie Higson produced and appeared in a spoof phone-in show Down the Line on BBC Radio 4. The first series was broadcast May–June 2006. A second series was broadcast 16 January – 20 February 2007, during which they won a Sony Radio Academy Award. A third series was broadcast in January 2008, a fourth in January 2011 and a fifth in May 2013. In February 2014, Radio 4 broadcast Nurse, written by Whitehouse and David Cummings and starring Esther Coles in the title role, with Whitehouse playing a variety of characters, including Graham Downs who had previously appeared in Down the Line. The show would become the basis for the 2015 BBC Two TV series Nurse.

=== Theatre ===
Whitehouse, and John Sullivan's son Jim Sullivan, have written Only Fools and Horses The Musical, which launched on 9 February 2019 at the Theatre Royal Haymarket, London. Whitehouse stars as Grandad. In October 2022 he temporarily handed the part over to Les Dennis.

=== Other work ===
He also starred alongside Eddie Large and Russ Abbot in episode 4 of Horne & Corden. Comic Relief 2011 contained a new parody video of "Newport (Ymerodraeth State of Mind)" directed by MJ Delaney featuring Whitehouse and other Welsh celebrities lip-syncing to the song. It is available to download via iTunes.

Johnny Depp described Whitehouse as "the greatest actor of all time". Depp appeared in the 2000 finale of The Fast Show, and he and Whitehouse have appeared in five films together: Finding Neverland, Corpse Bride, Alice in Wonderland and its sequel Alice Through the Looking Glass, and Mortdecai. The latter has been noted for alluding to Fast Show characters.

In 2026, Whitehouse voiced Pickles, a toy dog in the John Lewis Christmas advert.

== Influences ==
Whitehouse's main early influences were the sketches of Les Dennis and Dustin Gee and The Goodies. In 2001, when asked about comedians who had influenced him, Whitehouse said that Monty Python, Peter Cook and Dudley Moore were the main influences from when he was young. He also cited his modern influences as Harry Enfield, of whom he said without meeting him, he would not have been doing what he does now, and the approach of Reeves and Mortimer who he described as "far and away the best comedians that we have had in this country for a long while."

== Personal life ==
Whitehouse married Fiona Wightman in 1992, and the couple had two daughters before separating in 2000. The couple divorced three years later. Whitehouse supported his former wife in a civil action she has pursued against a national newspaper from the Mirror Group Newspapers, for accessing her medical records. The publisher later offered unreserved apologies. He had a third daughter with costume designer Natalie Rogers.

Whitehouse met Mine Conkbayir, who is of Turkish heritage, when she was aged 23. The couple have one daughter. As of 2024 they have been together 20 years and married for five, but maintain separate homes. Since 2024, they've hosted together the podcast I'm ADHD! No You're Not.

Whitehouse is a fan of Premier League football team Tottenham Hotspur.

== Filmography ==
=== Film ===
Year	Film	Role	Notes
1999	The Comedy Trail: A Shaggy Dog Story	The 13th Duke of Wybourne	
2000	Kevin & Perry Go Large	Bouncer	
2004	Harry Potter and the Prisoner of Azkaban	Sir Cadogan	Deleted scenes
2004	Finding Neverland	Stage Manager	
2005	Corpse Bride	William Van Dort, Mayhew, Paul the Head Waiter	Voice only
2010	Alice in Wonderland	Thackery Earwicket the March Hare	Voice only
2010	Burke & Hare	Drunk Gentleman	
2015	Mortdecai	Spinoza	
2016	Alice Through the Looking Glass	Thackery Earwicket the March Hare	Voice only
2017	The Death of Stalin	Anastas Mikoyan	
2017	Ghost Stories	Tony Matthews	
2018	Chuck Steel: Night of the Trampires	Barney, Gussman	Voice only
2018	King of Thieves	Carl Wood	
2019	The Personal History of David Copperfield	Mr Peggotty	
2026	Shaun the Sheep: The Beast of Mossy Bottom	Shopkeeper	Voice only

=== Television ===
Year	Television	Role	Notes
1990	A Bit of Fry and Laurie	Man at the Bottom Fondled in Audience	Episode: "Episode #2.3"
1990	Vic Reeves Big Night Out	David Rowells; Jean-Paul Gaultier; Mr. Popkins	Episodes: "Episode #1.1" "Episode #1.5" "Episode #1.6"
1990–1992	Harry Enfield's Television Programme	Fred Git; Lance; Mike "Smashie" Smash; Vincent	Also screenwriter
1991	Comic Relief	Mike "Smashie" Smash	TV film
1991	Paul Merton: The Series	Carver	Episode: "Episode #1.6"
1992	Bunch of Five	Spencer Pendel	Episode: "The Weekenders"
1993–1995	The Smell of Reeves and Mortimer	Jimmy Lea from Slade; Heinrich Himmler	
1994	Smashie and Nicey, the End of an Era	Mike "Smashie" Smash	TV film
1994–1997	Harry Enfield & Chums	Mister Dead; George Doberman; Julio Geordio; Fred Git; Lance; Michael Paine	Also screenwriter
1994–2014	The Fast Show	"Unlucky" Alf; Archie; Arthur Atkinson; Brilliant Kid; Poutremos Poutra-Poutremos; Chris the Crafty Cockney; The 13th Duke of Wymbourne; Lindsey; Ron Manager; Rowley Birkin QC; Ted; Various roles	Also co-creator and screenwriter
1998	Ted & Ralph	Ted; Rowley Birkin; Kevin Brown	TV film
1999	You Ain't Seen All These, Right?	Various roles	TV film
1999	David Copperfield	Pawnbroker	TV film
1999	Hooves of Fire	Prancer (voice)	
2000	Randall & Hopkirk (Deceased)	Sidney Crabbe	Episode: "A Blast from the Past"
2001	Jumpers for Goalposts	Ron Manager	
2001	Comic Relief: Say Pants to Poverty	Ted	TV film
2001	We Know Where You Live	Mike "Smashie" Smash; George	TV film
2001–2002	Fun at the Funeral Parlour	Harrison Ford The News Agent	Episodes: "Death in the Valleys" "The Heron Incident" "Dead Aid"
2001–2003	Happiness	Danny Spencer	Also screenwriter
2002	I Love the 100 Best Top Ten Lists of the Fast Show Ever!	Various characters	
2002	Legend of the Lost Tribe	Prancer (voice)	
2004	The Ultimate Pop Star	Mike "Smashie" Smash	TV film
2004	Swiss Toni	Brickabrack Lennard	Episode: "Fothergill 2000"
2005	Help	Various characters	
2005	The Catherine Tate Show	Dad	Episode: "Episode #2.5"
2007	Close Encounters of the Herd Kind	Prancer (voice)	
2007–2012	Harry & Paul	Various characters	Also co-creator and screenwriter
2009	Comic Relief 2009	Evan Davis; Theo Profiterole; Duncan Guillotine	TV film
2009	Horne & Corden		Episode: "Episode #1.4"
2010	Bellamy's People	Various characters	Also director and screenwriter
2014	The Life of Rock with Brian Pern	Pat Quid; Mike "Smashie" Smash	
2014	Harry and Paul's Story of the Twos	Various characters	
2015	Nurse	Billy	Also screenwriter
2018– present	Mortimer & Whitehouse: Gone Fishing	Himself	
2020	Smashie's Christmastastic Playlist	Mike "Smashie" Smash	
2021	Murder, They Hope	Monty	Episode: "Evil Under the Bun"
2022	The Lovebox in Your Living Room	Various	
2023	Paul Whitehouse: Our Troubled Rivers	Himself	Two-part documentary
2023	Dodger	Royston, Chief of the Yeomen Warders	Episode: "Coronation"
2023–present	The Change	Tony	TV series
2026–present	Harry Potter	Argus Filch	TV series

== Awards and nominations ==
Year	Award	Category	Film/series	Result
1995	Writers' Guild of Great Britain Award	TV – Light Entertainment; Shared with Harry Enfield, Simon Greenall, Ian Hislop, Geoffrey Perkins, Nick Newman, Harry Thompson & Kay Stonham	Harry Enfield & Chums	Won
1996	British Comedy Award	Top Male Comedy Performer	The Fast Show	Won
1997	BAFTA TV Award	Best Light Entertainment (Programme or Series); Shared with Charlie Higson, Sid Roberson & Mark Mylod	The Fast Show	Nominated
1997	Writers' Guild of Great Britain Award	TV – Light Entertainment; Shared with Dave Cummings, Harry Enfield, Ian Hislop, Gary Howe, Graham Linehan, Arthur Mathews, Nick Newman, Geoffrey Perkins & Richard Preddy	Harry Enfield & Chums	Won
1998	BAFTA TV Award	Best Light Entertainment (Programme or Series); Shared with Charlie Higson & Mark Mylod	The Fast Show	Won
1998	BAFTA TV Award	Best Light Entertainment Performance	The Fast Show	Won
1999	British Comedy Award	Best TV Comedy Actor	Ted & Ralph	Nominated
2002	BAFTA TV Award	Situation Comedy Award; Shared with David Cummings, Declan Lowney & Rosemary McGowan	Happiness	Nominated
2006	BAFTA TV Award	Best Comedy Programme or Series; Shared with Jane Berthoud, Chris Langham & Declan Lowney	Help	Won
2008	Banff World Media Festival Award	Best Comedy Programme; Shared with Harry Enfield	Harry & Paul	Nominated
2009	British Comedy Award	Best Sketch Show; Shared with Harry Enfield	Harry & Paul	Won
2010	British Comedy Award	Best Sketch Show; Shared with Harry Enfield	Harry & Paul	Nominated
2011	BAFTA TV Award	Best Comedy Programme; Shared with Harry Enfield, Sandy Johnson & Izzy Mant	Harry & Paul	Won
