= Stanleytown, Rhondda Cynon Taf =

Coordinates: 51.643°N 3.4299°W

Stanleytown
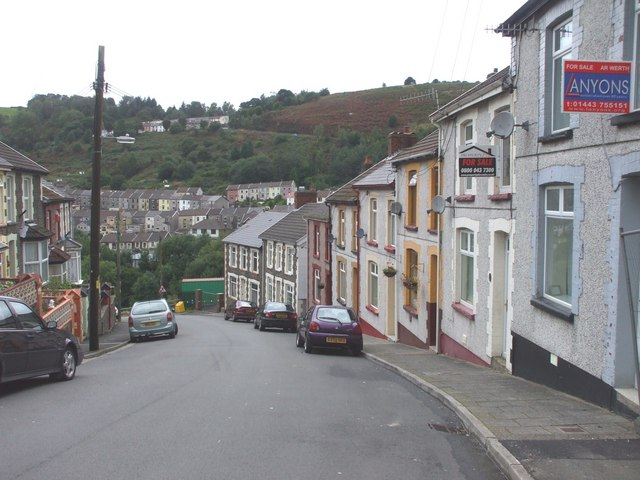
- Llanwonno Road, Stanleytown

- Location within Rhondda Cynon Taf
- OS grid reference: ST011947
- Principal area: Rhondda Cynon Taf
- Preserved county: Mid Glamorgan
- Country: Wales
- Sovereign state: United Kingdom
- Post town: Ferndale
- Postcode district: CF43
- Dialling code: 01443
- Police: South Wales
- Fire: South Wales
- Ambulance: Welsh
- UK Parliament: Rhondda
- Senedd Cymru – Welsh Parliament: Rhondda

Stanleytown is a village located in the Rhondda, Rhondda Cynon Taf, Wales.

== History ==
Stanleytown is located in the ancient parish of Llanwonno. The last working mine in the village closed in the 1960s setting off a long period of economic decline which worsened following the 1984-1985 national miner's strike which resulted in pits in nearby locations such as Maerdy closing. The local passenger railway line had closed in the 1960s following the Beeching Axe review, which also limited the prospects of easy commuting to Cardiff.

As part of the Tylorstown electoral ward. A new relief road "opens up" the valley for outward transport and inward investment the road terminating at the entrance to Stanleytown and the stopping point of Pontygwaith. Due to the topography of the Rhondda Fach which is a narrow valley with steep sides and limited flat land on the valley floor the construction of the road was a major civil-engineering project many years in the planning and two and a half years in the execution.

Stanleytown has its own football team, while its rugby union interests were combined into the Tylorstown rugby team called Tylorstown Tigers.

It is neighboured by the villages of Blaenllechau, Ferndale and Tylorstown

== People from Stanleytown ==
- Paul Whitehouse – comedian
