= Nurse (British TV series) =

2015 British medical sitcom

- Based on: BBC Radio 4 radio show of same name
- Written by: Paul Whitehouse; David Cummings; Esther Coles
- Directed by: Ian FitzGibbon
- Theme music composer: Joan Armatrading
- Opening theme: "Down to Zero"
- Ending theme: "Down to Zero"
- Country of origin: United Kingdom
- Original language: English
- No. of series: 1
- No. of episodes: 4

Production
- Executive producer: Gareth Edwards
- Producers: Tilusha Ghelani; Paul Whitehouse

Original release
- Network: BBC Two
- Release: 10 March – 31 March 2015

Nurse is a British sitcom broadcast on BBC Two, written by Paul Whitehouse, David Cummings and Esther Coles. It is about a community mental health nurse (Esther Coles) who visits her patients in their homes and is based on the sessions she has with these patients (most of whom are played by Paul Whitehouse), other actors who play patients include Cecilia Noble, Rosie Cavaliero, Simon Day, Jason Maza, Vilma Hollingbery, Jo Enright and Sue Elliot Nichols. The first series started broadcasting on 10 March 2015 and finished broadcasting on 31 March 2015.
