= Arabella Weir =

Scottish author, actress (b. 1957)

Arabella Weir MBE
- Born: Arabella Helen Weir; 6 December 1957 (age 68); San Francisco, California, U.S.
- Occupations: Comedian, actress, writer
- Spouse: Jeremy Norton (m. 1995; sep. 2013)
- Children: 2
- Father: Michael Scott Weir

Arabella Helen Weir MBE (born 6 December 1957) is an American-born British comedian, actress and writer. She played roles in the comedy series The Fast Show, Posh Nosh and Two Doors Down, and has written several books, including Does My Bum Look Big in This? Weir has also written for The Independent and The Guardian and the latter's Weekend magazine.

== Early life and education ==
Weir was born in 1957, in San Francisco, California, United States, to Scottish parents. She is the daughter of former British ambassador Sir Michael Weir and his wife, Alison (née Walker), who had met while studying at the University of Oxford; her father was from Dunfermline and her mother was from the Scottish Borders, daughter of the headmaster of a small boarding school.

Weir attended nursery school in Washington D.C., where her father was posted as a member of the British diplomatic service. She later attended the Sacre Coeur Convent in Cairo, and the French Lycee in London. Having spent many holidays in Scotland as a child, Weir describes herself as "culturally Scottish". After her parents' divorce she initially lived with her mother, her two older brothers and her younger sister in the UK. She has described her relationship with her mother as difficult, and in her comedy routine has exposed her mother's "cruel, snobby campaign to shame her into losing weight." Weir's relationship with her mother later became the subject of her debut one-woman show, Does My Mum Loom Big in This? At the age of nine she moved to Bahrain with her father while her brothers were at prep school and her younger sister stayed with their mother.

Weir returned to London after passing the eleven-plus in Bahrain and her father was posted to New York. She was a pupil at the Camden School for Girls, where her mother was a teacher, and then studied drama at Middlesex Polytechnic. As a teenager, she was a backing singer in the British pub rock band Bazooka Joe, whose bass player was Stuart Goddard, who later became famous as Adam Ant.

== Career ==
Weir's television career breakthrough came in 1994 in BBC's The Fast Show; she later also became widely known for her roles in Posh Nosh and Two Doors Down. In addition to acting, Weir wrote several episodes of The Fast Show and Posh Nosh, and has also written for The Independent and The Guardian.

In 1998, Weir published the international bestseller Does My Bum Look Big in This?, the title of which was a catchphrase of her character "Insecure Woman" in The Fast Show. In 2000, she published her second novel Onwards and Upwards, followed by Stupid Cupid in 2002.

In 2001, Weir took part in the Weakest Link Comedians Special. In 2006, Weir appeared as a contestant in the first series on Celebrity MasterChef. In 2007, Weir appeared in Skins as Michelle Richardson's mother, Anna.

Weir played Chris Harper in Calendar Girls at the Noël Coward Theatre in the West End of London from November 2009 until the play closed in January 2010.

Weir voiced the female incarnation of the Doctor in the Doctor Who Unbound Big Finish 2003 episode Exile. American alternative weekly Houston Press's Jef Rouner described her portrayal as "one of the most melancholy of all the Doctors." Weir appeared in the Doctor Who 2011 Christmas Special The Doctor, the Widow and the Wardrobe.

Weir performed with the original cast from The Fast Show (with the exception of Mark Williams) in six online-only episodes sponsored by the Fosters brand.

From 2013 until 2016, she starred as Jenny in Drifters. In 2015, she joined the team of presenters for BBC Two's Food and Drink programme. She also played a small role in Citizen Khan in the mid-2010s. She has also appeared with Ready Steady Cook.

Since 2016 she has been starring in the BBC Scotland sitcom Two Doors Down. Weir's performance was criticised by Ben Arnold, commenting in The Guardian "her Scottish accent [is] still a work in progress, it would seem." When Weir was asked about this comment on Richard Herring's RHLSTP comedy podcast, she said she was doing specifically a Paisley accent on the show and that both her parents were from Scotland, which she considers her home. Weir added that Scottish actor David Tennant had responded to The Guardian's comment with the words "What the f*** are they on about, it's impeccable!", and that Ben Arnold (who himself is English) had later said to her he was sorry for making the comment.

In June 2019, Weir premiered her debut one-woman show, Does My Mum Loom Big in This?, a comedic analysis of Weir's helter-skelter childhood and her difficult relationship with her late mother. The show's title is a pun on Weir's bestselling novel Does My Bum Look Big in This? She took the show to the 2019 Edinburgh Festival.

In 2021, Weir narrated the pilot episode of the E4 survival reality competition format Naked, Alone and Racing to Get Home. Sean Pertwee replaced her for the full series.

Weir appeared in three episodes of Coronation Street as Aggie and Ed Bailey's old neighbour, Yvette, in June 2023.

Weir has appeared in multiple episodes from season 1 to season 6 of the BBC Radio 4 comedy "Believe it!".

== Personal life ==
In 1995, Weir began a relationship with Jeremy Norton. They have two children, a daughter and a son. They separated in 2013.

Actor David Tennant is a close friend of Weir's and is godfather to her younger child. They met while filming the six-part comedy drama Takin' Over the Asylum for BBC Scotland in 1994. Shortly after, Tennant moved to London and lodged with Weir at her house in Crouch End for five years.

She is a friend of Gordon Brown, and headlined a rally for his think tank, Our Scottish Future, in Edinburgh on 1 June 2023.

Weir was appointed Member of the Order of the British Empire (MBE) in the 2024 New Year Honours for services to the Arts and to Young People.

== Filmography ==
| Year | Title | Role | Notes |
|---|---|---|---|
| 1981 | The French Lieutenant's Woman | Girl on Undercliff | |
| 1986 | The Frog Prince | Zar | |
| 1997 | Shooting Fish | Mrs. Stratton-Luce | |
| 2002 | Killer Queen! | Narrator | Documentary film |
| 2018 | Colette | Mme. de Caillavet | |

== Television ==
| Year | Title | Role | Notes |
|---|---|---|---|
| 1981 | BBC Television Shakespeare | Lady in Waiting | Episode: Othello |
| 1983 | Philip Marlowe, Private Eye | Carita | Episode: "Nevada Gas" |
| 1983 | Jury | Linda | Episode: "Julian" |
| 1983 | Nelly's Version | Hospital Nurse | Television film |
| 1986 | Screen Two | Prish Holt/Liz Murison | 2 episodes |
| 1986 | Shades of Darkness | Anne Page | Episode: "The Demon Lover" |
| 1986 | Call Me Mister | Lena Santon | Episode: "Frozen Assets" |
| 1987 | The Corner House | Annie | 4 episodes |
| 1988 | Les Girls | Polly | 7 episodes |
| 1988 | This Is David Lander | Claudette Dernu | Episode: "A Growing Crisis" |
| 1989 | The Bill | Jo Whitney | Episode: "One to One" |
| 1989 | Traffik | Selina | Episode: "The Criminal" |
| 1989 | The Paradise Club | Rebecca Ford | Episode: "Crack in the Mirror" |
| 1989 | Alexei Sayle's Stuff | Various | 3 episodes |
| 1990 | Harry Enfield's Television Programme | Second wife | 1 episode |
| 1991 | The Lime Grove Story | | Television film. Voice role |
| 1992 | KYTV | Mandy Stringer | Episode: "Talking Head" |
| 1993 | The Good Guys | Annabel West | Episode: "Missing" |
| 1993 | One Foot in the Grave | Sonia | Episode: "Hearts of Darkness" |
| 1993 | Bonjour la Classe | Granddaughter | Episode: "Vive la Revolution" |
| 1994 | Takin' Over the Asylum | Paula | 3 episodes |
| 1994–1995 | The All New Alexei Sayle Show | Various characters Nancy | Series 1; episodes 2 & 3 Series 2; episodes 1–3 & 6 |
| 1994–1997, 2000, 2014 | The Fast Show | Various characters | 25 episodes (including 4 Specials) |
| 1995 | 1995 | Sandra the Lawyer | Television film |
| 1995 | 99-1 | Claudia | Episode: "A Game of Two Halves" |
| 1995 | How to Be a Little Sod | Abigail | Episode: "A Life of Her Own" |
| 1997 | Harry Enfield & Chums | Labour Politician | 1 episode |
| 1998 | Goodness Gracious Me | Various characters | 1 episode |
| 1998 | My Summer with Des | Barbara | Television film |
| 1998 | Ted & Ralph | Mrs. Jenkins / Ralph's Mother / Henrietta Gladstone | Television film |
| 1998–2000 | The Creatives | Tanya Gray | Main role. 12 episodes |
| 1999 | McBeal Appeal | | Television film |
| 1999 | You Ain't Seen All These, Right? | Various characters | Television film |
| 1999 | The Timekeepers of the Millennium | Kronos | |
| 2000 | Randall & Hopkirk (Deceased) | Judith Milton | Episode: "Paranoia" |
| 2003 | The Fast Show Farewell Tour | Various characters | Television film |
| 2003 | Posh Nosh | Minty Marchmont | Main role. 8 episodes |
| 2003 | Test the Nation: The National IQ Test 2003 | Celebrity participant | Quiz show |
| 2004 | Spooks | Michelle Molby | Episode: "Celebrity" (uncredited) |
| 2007 | Hana's Helpline | Hana | 6 episodes. Voice role |
| 2007–2008 | Skins | Anna | 3 episodes |
| 2007–2008 | Genie in the House | Peggy | 3 episodes |
| 2009 | Hotel Trubble | Sister Matic | Episode: "A Sistery Mystery" |
| 2011 | The Fast Show Faster | Insecure Woman / Mother / Northern Nigella | 2 episodes |
| 2011 | Doctor Who | Billis | Episode: "The Doctor, the Widow and the Wardrobe" |
| 2013 | Citizen Khan | Jackie | Episode: "Shazia's Gym Visit" |
| 2013 | Two Doors Down | Beth Baird | Television film. Pilot to the series |
| 2013–2016 | Drifters | Jenny (Meg's mother) | Recurring role. 12 episodes |
| 2014 | Midsomer Murders | Angela Linklater | Episode: "Wild Harvest" |
| 2014 | House of Fools | 1970s Wife/TV Woman | 2 episodes |
| 2015 | Nurse | Mrs. Hamilton | 1 episode |
| 2016–2025 | Two Doors Down | Beth Baird | Main role. 46 episodes |
| 2019 | Pure | | First episode |
| 2023 | Coronation Street | Ingrid | 3 episodes |

== Books ==
=== Novels ===
- Does My Bum Look Big in This?: the Diary of an Insecure Woman (1998)
- Onwards and Upwards (2000)
- Stupid Cupid (2002)
- The Rise and Rise of Tabitha Baird (2014), YA
- The Endless Trials of Tabitha Baird (2015), YA

=== Non-fiction ===
- The Real Me Is Thin: or Why All Women Think They're Fat (2011)
