= Plasterer =

Occupation of creating plasterwork

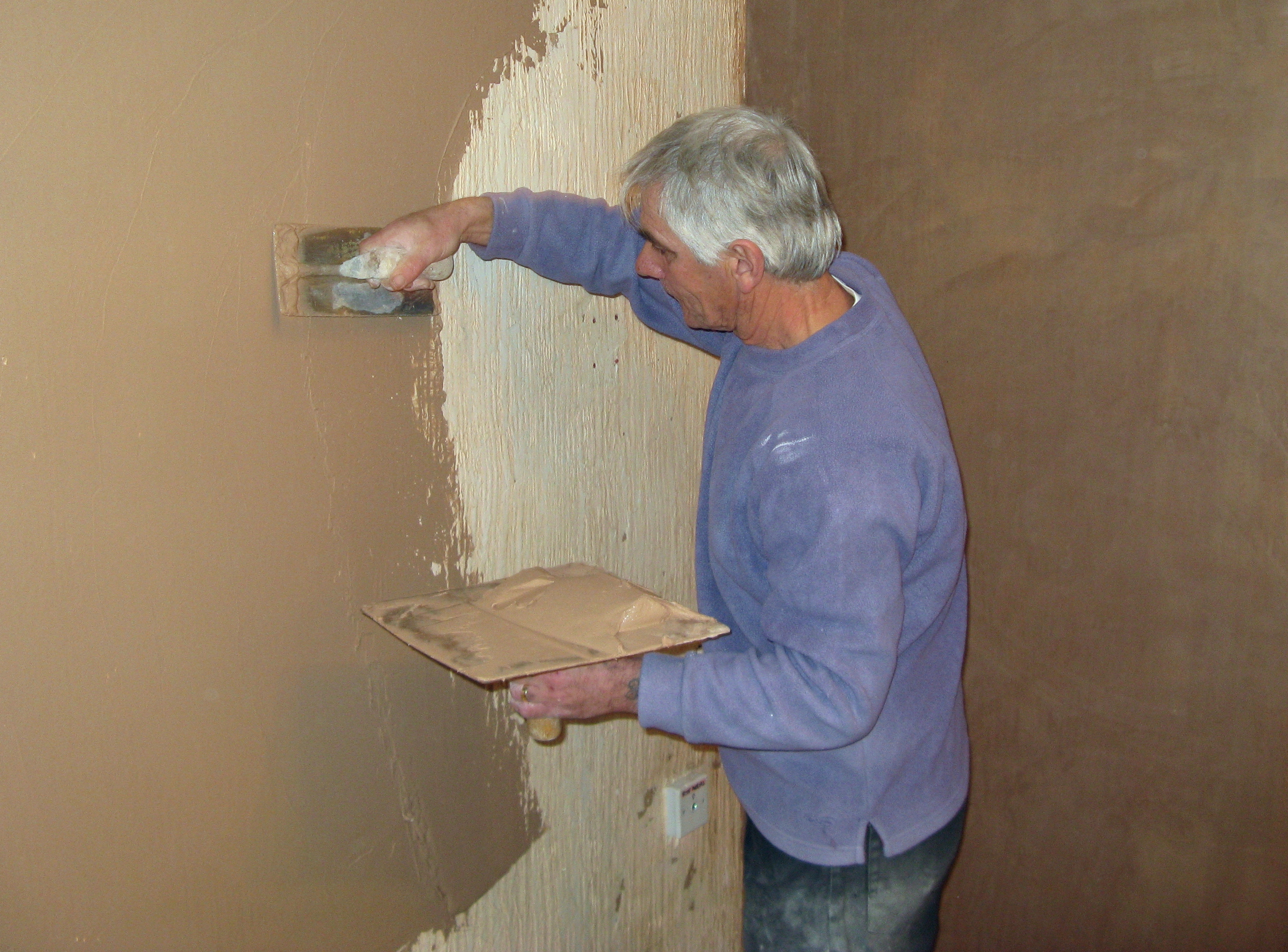
- A plasterer at work

Occupation
- Occupation type: Vocational
- Activity sectors: Construction

Description
- Competencies: Heights, patience, steady hand, ability to read plans, physically strong
- Education required: Apprenticeship
- Fields of employment: Construction
- Related jobs: Carpenter, electrician, house painter and decorator, plumber

A plasterer is a tradesperson who works with plaster, such as forming a layer of plaster on an interior wall or plaster decorative moldings on ceilings or walls. The process of creating plasterwork, called plastering, has been used in building construction for centuries.

== History ==
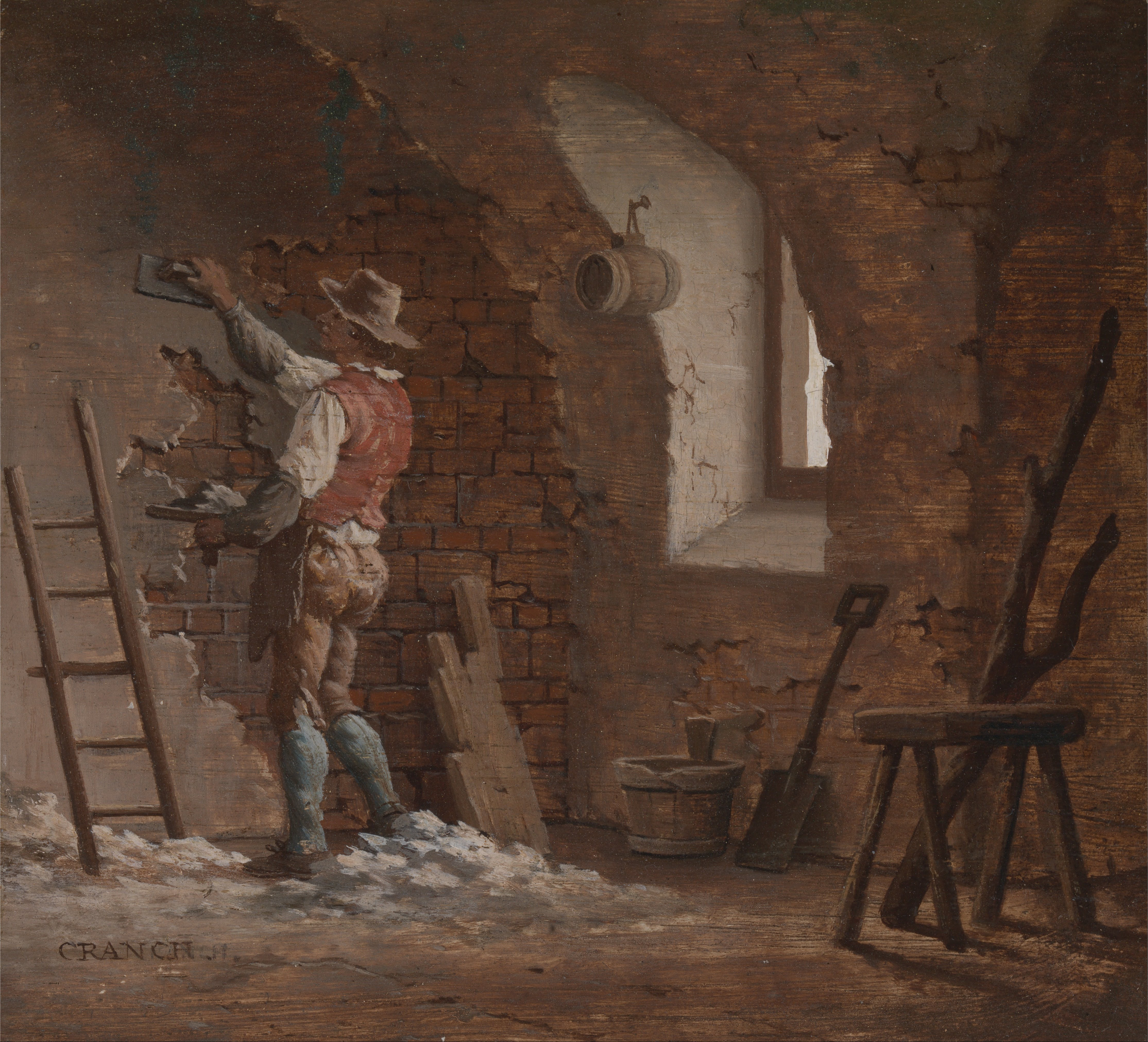
Early 19th century plasterer at work – painting by John Cranch (1751–1821)

Plasterwork is one of the most ancient of handicrafts employed in connection with building operations, the earliest evidence showing that the dwellings of primitive man were erected in a simple fashion with sticks and plastered with mud. Soon a more lasting and sightly material was found and employed to take the place of mud or slime, and that perfection in the compounding of plastering materials was approached at a very remote period is made evident by the fact that some of the earliest plastering which has remained undisturbed excels in its scientific composition that which we use at the present day.

The pyramids in Egypt contain plasterwork executed at least four thousand years ago, probably much earlier, and yet existing, hard and durable, at the present time. From recent discoveries it has been ascertained that the principal tools of the plasterer of that time were practically identical in design, shape and purpose with those used today. For their finest work the Egyptians used a plaster made from calcined gypsum just like plaster of Paris of the present time, and their methods of plastering on reeds resemble in every way our lath, plaster, float and set work. Hair was introduced to strengthen the stuff, and the whole finished somewhat under an inch thick.

Very early in the history of Greek architecture we find the use of plaster of a fine white lime stucco, such has been found at Mycenae. The art had reached perfection in Greece more than five centuries before Christ, and plaster was frequently used to cover temples externally and internally, in some cases even where the building was of marble. It formed a splendid ground for decorative painting, which at this period of Grecian history had reached a very high degree of beauty. Also known as Gyporockers.

== Tools and materials ==
In the more common operations of plastering, comparatively few tools and few materials are required, but the workman efficient in all branches of the craft will possess a very large variety of implements. The materials of the workman are laths, lath nails, lime, sand, hair, plaster of Paris, and a variety of cements, together with various ingredients to form coloring washes, et cetera.

=== Laths ===
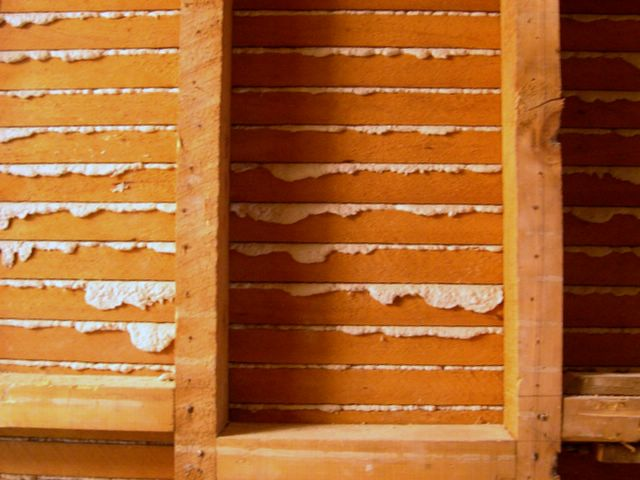
Lath seen from the back with brown coat oozing through

Wood laths are narrow strips of some straight-grained wood, generally Baltic or American fir, in lengths of from two to four or five feet to suit the distances at which the timbers of a floor or partition are set. Laths are about an inch wide, and are made in three thicknesses; single (1/8 to 3/16 inch thick), lath and a half (1/4 inch thick), and double (3/8–1/2 inch thick). The thicker laths should be used in ceilings, to stand the extra strain, and the thinner variety in vertical work such as partitions, except where the latter will be subjected to rough usage, in which case thicker laths become necessary. Laths are usually nailed with a space of about 3/8 of an inch between them to form a plaster key. Laths were formerly all made by hand. A large quantity, however, are now made by machinery and are known as sawn laths, those made by hand being called rent or riven laths. Rent (riven) laths give the best results, as they split in a line with the grain of the wood, and are stronger and not so liable to twist as machine-made laths, some of the fibers of which are usually cut in the process of sawing. Care should be taken to check the pH value of the wood; oak contains tannic acid which attacks the lime, this can compromise bond strength.

Laths must be nailed so as to break joint in bays three or four feet wide with ends butted one against the other. By breaking the joints of the lathing in this way, the tendency for the plaster to crack along the line of joints is diminished and a better key is obtained and it provides restraint for the timber frame. Every lath should be nailed at each end and wherever it crosses a joist or stud. All timbers over three inches (76 mm) wide should be counter-lathed, that is, have a fillet or double lath nailed along the centre upon which the laths are then nailed. This is done to preserve a good key for the plaster. Walls liable to damp are sometimes battened and lathed in order to form an air cavity between the damp wall and the plastering.

Lathing of metal, either of wire or in the form of perforated sheets, is now extensively used on account of its fireproof and lasting quality. There are very many kinds of this material Metal made in different designs under various patents, the best known in England being the Jhilmil, the Bostwick, Lathing, and the Expanded Metal lathing. The two last-named are also widely used in America. Lathing nails are usually of iron, cut, wrought or cast, and in the better class of work they are galvanized to prevent rusting. Zinc nails are sometimes used, but are costly.

=== Lime ===
The lime principally used for internal plastering is that calcined from chalk, oyster shells or other nearly pure limestone, and is known as fat, pure, chalk or rich lime. Hydraulic limes are also used by the plasterer, chiefly for external work. Perfect slaking of the calcined lime before being used is very important as, if used in a partially slaked condition, it will "blow" when in position and blister the work. Lime should therefore be run as soon as the building is begun, and at least three weeks should elapse between the operation of running the lime and its use. Due to time constraints Hydrated Lime mixed with plaster is normally used for modern construction. Slaking is not required if more time is allowed for finishing the surface after application which is a common practice where a quality finish is required, however in the housing industry it is often run for three days, the time it takes to prepare an average house for plastering, to achieve a lower quality cost effective finish.

=== Hair ===
Hair is used in plaster as a binding medium, and gives tenacity to the material. Traditionally horsehair was the most commonly used binder, as it was easily available before the development of the motor-car. Hair functions in much the same way as the strands in fiberglass resin, by controlling and containing any small cracks within the mortar while it dries or when it is subject to flexing.

Ox-hair, which is sold in three qualities, is now the kind usually specified; but horsehair, which is shorter, is sometimes substituted or mixed with the ox-hair in the lower qualities. Good hair should be long (In the UK cow and horse hair of short and long lengths is used), and left greasey (lanolin grease) because this protects against some degradation when introduced into the very high alkaline plaster[1]. Before use it must be well beaten, or teased, to separate the lumps. In America, goats' hair is frequently used, though it is not so strong as ox-hair. The quantity used in good work is one pound of hair to two or three cubic feet of coarse stuff (in the UK up to 12 kg per metric cube). Hair reinforcement in lime plaster is common, and many types of hair and other organic fibres can be found in historic plasters [4]. However, organic material in lime will degrade in damp environments, particularly on damp external renders.[5] This problem has given rise to the use of polyprolene fibres in new lime renders [6]. Research presented at the UK Building Limes Forum 2012 looked at the potential for hair degradation in lime plasters.

Manila hemp fiber has been used as a substitute for hair. Plaster for hair slabs made with manila hemp fiber broke at 195 pounds (88 kg), plaster mixed with sisal hemp at 150 pounds (68 kg), jute at 145 pounds (66 kg), and goats' hair at 144 pounds (65 kg). Another test was made in the following manner. Two barrels of mortar were made up of equal proportions of lime and sand, one containing the usual quantity of goats' hair, and the other Manila fiber. After remaining in a dry cellar for nine months the barrels were opened. It was found that the hair had been almost entirely eaten away by the action of the lime, and the mortar consequently broke up and crumbled quite easily. The mortar containing the Manila hemp, on the other hand, showed great cohesion, and required some effort to pull it apart, the hemp fiber being undamaged.

== Methods ==
For fine plasterer's sand-work, special sands, not hitherto referred to, are used, such as silver sand or fine foundry sand, which is used when a light color and fine texture are required. In medical centres one part Barium is added to two parts cement and five of sand where the walls need to block X-rays. When coating or rendering concrete surfaces a "splash" coat of one part cement to one of sand in liquid form is either thrown with a trowel or sprayed on the surface. This not only provides a better key for the render but prevents the porous concrete from sucking the water from it. For external work Portland cement is undoubtedly the best material on account of its strength, durability, and weather resisting External properties. If the plaster coat needs to be particularly strong and resistant to cracking, such as the walls of a squash court, Sizing is mixed with the plaster before application to increase both the surface bond strength and flexibility.

The first coat of render is from 1/2 to 3/4 inches thick, and is mixed, dependant on the surface to be covered, in the proportions of from one part of cement to two of sand to one part to six of sand. A ½ shovel of Lime is often added to make the mix more pliable. After dampening the surface to be coated, two horizontal bands of render called "screeds" are applied, one at around head height and the other just above floor level, these are then marked for vertical/horizontal alignment, finished, then allowed to partially dry. In a process similar to laying concrete, the wall is then rendered to a slightly higher level than the screeds, and using a "straight edge" (screed), the Plasterer uses the screeds as guides removing the excess render and leaving a rough flat surface. For a lower cost finish or if a rough surface is specified the screeds can be dispensed with. The render is then finished with a float (a smooth flat wooden tool with handle) to fill or remove larger imperfections. For some applications where a stronger key is required the surface is scored by later use of a float with nails protruding from the base. If the render is to be the finished surface then a float with a sponge attached to the base is then used on the wall until the surface is blemish free.

For quality work, or where the wall is out of plumb requiring a large variation in render thickness, a thin "scratch" render coat is first applied then a second coat finished as described above. After around 24 hours the render has dried but before the final plaster coat is applied a trowel is used to scrape loose sand grains from the surface which would otherwise spoil the plaster finish.

The finishing or setting plaster coat which is about 3/16 inches thick is worked with a hand trowel on the surface of the rendering, which must first be well wetted. The plaster is applied in two coats to slow the drying speed of the second coat and after drying must still be wetted and worked for a time to produce a thin film of watery plaster which has the effect of "Polishing" the finished surface. This finishing plaster is normally trowelled on two or three passes to achieve this.

== In popular culture ==
Harry Enfield's character Loadsamoney worked as a plasterer.

== See also ==
- Plastering
- Plaster
