= Harry Enfield's Brand Spanking New Show =

- Created by: Harry Enfield
- Directed by: Dewi Humphreys
- Starring: Harry Enfield; Rupert Vansittart; Elizabeth Bennett; Sally Bretton; Samantha Bond; Jason Hughes; Julia St. John; Jonathan Moore; Stephen Chaplin; Gwyneth Strong; Archie Panjabi; Andy Taylor; Kim Wall; Simon Greenall; Sue Cleaver
- Country of origin: United Kingdom
- Original language: English
- No. of series: 1
- No. of episodes: 12

Production
- Running time: 30 minutes
- Production company: Tiger Aspect Productions

Original release
- Network: Sky 1
- Release: 11 September – 27 November 2000

Related
- Harry Enfield's Television Programme; Harry & Paul

Harry Enfield's Brand Spanking New Show is a British sketch show (sketch comedy) starring Harry Enfield. It was first broadcast on Sky 1 in 2000 for one series.

The series followed Enfield's first project Harry Enfield's Television Programme. Seven years later, Enfield returned with Harry and Paul, once again on the BBC. Enfield admitted in 2010 that he did not give the series his full attention, as he was involved in the editing of Kevin & Perry Go Large at the same time as the show's production, so the show suffered as a result.

A compilation of some of the best sketches from the series was released on DVD and VHS in 2002.
