= Kevin Patterson =

Kevin Patterson may refer to:

- Kevin Patterson (writer) (born 1964), Canadian medical doctor and writer
- Kevin Patterson (singer) (born 1960), Scottish songwriter and singer
- Kevin the Teenager, a character created and played by the British comedian Harry Enfield
