= Kevin & Perry Go Large =

2000 film directed by Ed Bye

- British release poster
- Directed by: Ed Bye
- Written by: David Cummings; Harry Enfield
- Produced by: Peter Bennet-Jones; Harry Enfield; Jolyon Symonds; Barnaby Thompson
- Starring: Harry Enfield; Kathy Burke; Rhys Ifans
- Cinematography: Alan Almond
- Edited by: Mark Wybourn
- Music by: Cecily Fay; Philip Pope
- Production company: Tiger Aspect Pictures
- Distributed by: Icon Film Distribution
- Release date: 21 April 2000
- Running time: 82 minutes
- Country: United Kingdom
- Language: English
- Budget: £2 million
- Box office: £10,099,770

Kevin & Perry Go Large is a 2000 British teen coming-of-age sex comedy film based on the Harry Enfield sketch Kevin the Teenager. The film was written by Dave Cummings and Harry Enfield and directed by Ed Bye. Enfield, Kathy Burke and Louisa Rix return to their roles after appearing on Harry Enfield & Chums. James Fleet replaced Stephen Moore as Kevin's father. The film received mixed reviews but has since gained a cult following.

== Plot ==
Teenager Kevin has tried to lose his virginity for three years. He and his best friend Perry decide they want to go to Ibiza to become DJs and seduce women. When Kevin's parents, Ray and Sheila, see his bad school report, they forbid the trip. They later compromise: the boys can go if they get jobs to pay for it. Searching fruitlessly for jobs, the boys end up at a house party, where a popular girl, Sharon, passes out drunk next to Kevin. Perry, seeing the two in bed together the following morning, assumes Kevin has lost his virginity. Kevin lies that he had sex with Sharon, but is overheard while leaving the party. In the town centre, an angry Sharon confronts and humiliates Kevin about this, mockingly calling him "virgin".

Distraught, Kevin arrives home in time to sign for the delivery of Ray's new credit card. He seizes the card and takes it to the bank to steal the plane fare from Ray's bank account. At the bank, he accidentally foils a robbery, and the manager rewards him and Perry with money with which the boys plan to fund the trip. As a reward, Kevin's parents approve of the trip, as long as they can accompany the boys, much to Kevin's horror.

In Ibiza, the boys spot the 'girls of their dreams' Candice and Gemma. They also meet club DJ and record producer Eyeball Paul. The boys spend the day at the beach and chat with the girls but fail to seduce them. That night, the boys walk, filming the events around them. Kevin films a couple kissing, and they turn out to be Ray and Sheila. Kevin sulks while he and Perry hang out with Ray and Sheila, ending up at the club "Amnesia" where they dance the night away—without Candice and Gemma, who were refused entry by the doorman, who holds a hand-mirror to call them ugly.

The next day, the boys go to Paul's, and he makes them clean his house in return for his listening to their tapes. While leaving, they spot Candice and Gemma, but again their attempts to woo them end in failure, although the girls bond with the boys when realising they know Eyeball Paul and they may be able to get them into the clubs.

The boys wait outside the girls' hotel for four hours while the girls have a makeover, and they are admitted to Amnesia with Kevin and Perry, but yet again the boys "strike out" when they get vomited on by other revellers and leave embarrassed while the girls meet two other men in the club. That night, Perry videotapes Ray and Sheila having sex. The next day, Paul listens to the boys' music as they clean his kitchen. He stumbles across the parents' sex tape and shows it to everyone. Kevin lashes out at Perry after realizing that it was Perry who filmed them. Baz, Paul's manager and chauffeur driver, later persuades Paul to give the video back to the boys.

Kevin spends the rest of the day sulking around alone and becomes dejected after seeing the girls with the men from the club. Perry spends the day at the beach and bumps into the girls. The two men who are revealed to be gay lovers whom the girls had befriended. Gemma reveals she is attracted to Perry and Candice admits to liking Kevin. Perry then runs into Eyeball Paul, who says he likes their song and he will play it in the club that night. Perry hurries to tell Kevin the news, and the friends reconcile.

That night, they and the girls go to the club again in Paul's limousine. Their track is played, but the boys and Ray and Sheila, who had wanted to visit the club, are embarrassed to find that Paul has incorporated the sex tape and the boy's love messages to the girls into the track in an attempt to humiliate the boys. This backfires on Paul when the track becomes a club favourite and the crowd, including the girls, love the boys and their mix. Unhappy at the boys' success, Paul turns off the track, which angers the crowd. Paul becomes annoyed and attempts to destroy the boy's vinyl record but is stopped by Baz. Paul fires Baz, who punches and pushes him off stage before returning the record to the boys to continue the set, and the crowd continue to party.

Kevin and Perry take over as DJs and keep the club dancing through the night. The next morning, Kevin and Perry have sex with Candice and Gemma, respectively, on a beach surrounded by other couples having sex. The girls become the boys' girlfriends while Kevin and Perry sign copies of their record in a music shop with Baz as their new manager. Sharon receives a signed copy of the record and boasts that she and Kevin had sex before he was famous while Kevin's parents sign copies of their videos about better mid-marriage sexual intimacy.

== Cast ==
Cast (in order of appearance)	Characters
Natasha Little	Anne Boleyn
Harry Enfield	Kevin Patterson
Louisa Rix	Mum (Sheila Patterson)
James Fleet	Dad (Ray Patterson)
Anna Shillinglaw	Bikini Girl
Kathy Burke	Perry Carter
Badi Uzzaman	Shopkeeper
Sam Parks	Policeman
Kenneth Cranham	Vicar
Mark Tonderai	Record Store Boss
Patsy Byrne	Old Lady
Amelia Curtis	Sharon
Christopher Ettridge	Postman
Frank Harper	Armed Robber
Rupert Vansittart	Bank Manager
Laura Fraser	Candice
Tabitha Wady	Gemma
Rhys Ifans	Eyeball Paul
Steve O'Donnell	Big Baz
Paul Whitehouse	Bouncer 1
James Dark	Clubber
James Murray	Candice's Adonis
Steve McFadden	Bouncer 2

== Production ==
=== Music ===
- Y:Traxx – "Mystery Land (Sickboys Courtyard Remix)"
- The Precocious Brats feat. Kevin & Perry – "Big Girl (All I Wanna Do Is Do It!)"
- Fatboy Slim – "Love Island (4/4 Mix)"
- The Wiseguys – "Oh La La"
- Underworld – "King of Snake (Fatboy Slim Remix)"
- CRW – "I Feel Love - (JamX & De Leon Remix)
- Jools Holland & His Rhythm & Blues Orchestra feat. Jamiroquai – "I'm In the Mood for Love"
- Fragma – "Toca Me"
- Fragma – "Toca Me (Inpetto Mix)"
- Ayla – "Ayla (DJ Taucher Remix)"
- Sunburst – "Eyeball (Eyeball Paul's Theme)"
- Yomanda – "Sunshine (Hi-Gate remix)"
- Oasis – "Wonderwall" (excerpts performed by Mr. & Mrs. Patterson)
- Mauro Picotto – "Lizard (Claxxix Mix)"
- Gladys Knight – "The Look of Love"
- Skip Raiders feat. Jada – "Another Day (Perfecto Dub Mix)"
- Samuel Barber – "Barber's 'Adagio For Strings'"
- Hybrid feat. Chrissie Hynde – "Kid 2000"
- The Precocious Brats feat. Kevin & Perry – "Big Girl (All I Wanna Do is Do It!) (Yomanda Remix)"
- Phil Pope & Los Lidos – "Mi Amour"
- Roger Sanchez – "The Partee"
- The Clash – "Straight To Hell"
- Lange feat. The Morrighan – "Follow Me"
- Tosca – "Fuck Dubs Parts 1&2"
- Groove Armada – "Chicago"
- The Birthday Party – "Release the Bats"
- Ver Vlads – "Crazy Ivan"
- Drew Milligan & Stewart Resiyn – "Elixir"
- Nick Bardon & Steve Warr – "Insanity"
- Dominic Glynn & Martin Smith – "Onslaught"
- Laurie Johnson – "Galliard"
- Mike Hankinson – "Death & The Maiden"
- Nightmares on Wax – "Sweet Harry" / "Emotion"
- Nightmares on Wax – "Ethnic Majority"
- Southside Spinners – "Luvstruck"
- The Precocious Brats feat. Kevin & Perry – "Big Girl (All I Wanna Do is Do It!) (The Shaft Remix)"
- Signum feat. Scott Mac – "Coming on Strong"

=== Locations ===
The Ibiza club Amnesia makes an appearance in the film. However, the front view of the club, as shown in the film, is not the same as the actual Amnesia. The DJ booth that Eyeball Paul uses in the film is not the actual booth of the club, which is sited above the giant "spectrum analyser", seen in the film to the right of the fictitious booth. The Harlequin Shopping Centre in Watford was also used. Freemans Close in Stoke Poges in Buckinghamshire was used for the location of the Pattersons' house. Ibiza Airport was briefly used; however, the footage of a Virgin Sun Airlines plane landing was actually filmed at El Altet airport in Alicante.

Kevin and Perry and Kevin's parents' apartment is in Santa Eulària des Riu in Ibiza. The beach that the boys go to is Cala Benirras on the western shore north of San Antonio. The buying of the pornography magazine was done in the high street of Shepperton. The opening sequence where Kevin dreams of saving Anne Boleyn from execution was filmed at Dover Castle.

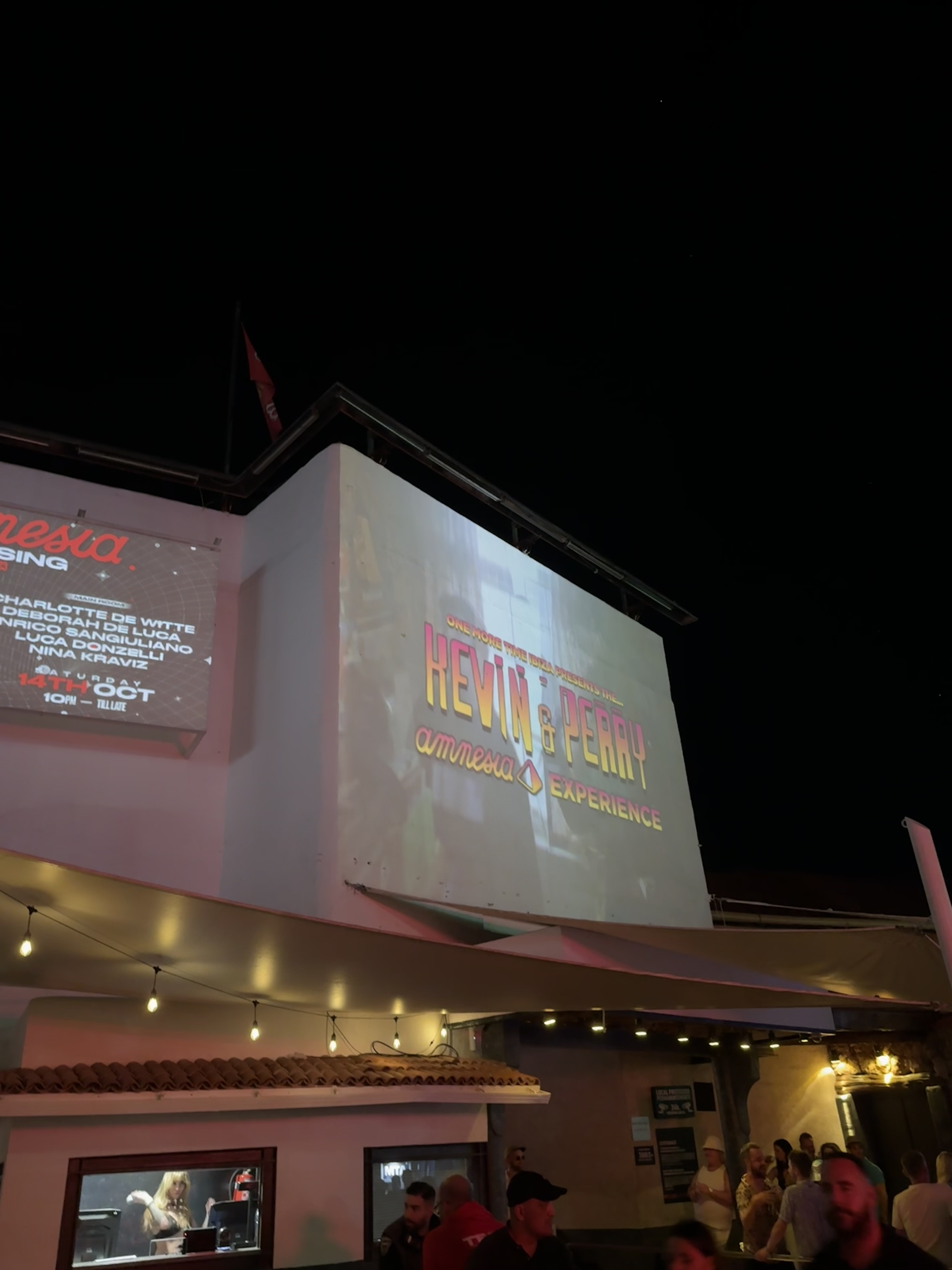
Amnesia hosting a commemorative trance party for Kevin & Perry, Ibiza, September 2023

== Reception ==
=== Box office ===
Kevin & Perry Go Large was the top-grossing film at the British box office over the Easter weekend of 2000, taking £2 million and ranking as the number one film in the UK. The next week the film was knocked off the top spot by Scream 3, but it regained its number one position the week after, in a week in which box office revenues were down due to warm weather.

=== Critical reception ===
The film received mixed reviews by critics and has a rating of 17% on the review aggregator website Rotten Tomatoes. The Guardian said the film was inferior to "the wave of American gross-out comedies," but noted that "Enfield himself can raise a laugh simply by throwing his arms around and moaning—as he frequently does—'I'm not your slave!'" Empire rated the film 3 out of 5 stars. Radio Times also gave the film 3 stars out of 5, whilst the BBC rated the film 4 stars out of 5. Mark Sinker of the British Film Institute reviewed the film, saying "Go Large is an amiable roll through vomit, poo and erections, public-humiliation and hating-your-parents gags, working through the most obvious permutations and a scatter of clever ones. Fans of Harry Enfield and Kathy Burke's characters get pretty much what they are after. Their foray beyond the television-skit format of Harry Enfield and Chums cheerfully enters the revolting world of Farrelly Brothers' humour."
