= Smashie and Nicey =

British comedy characters

Dave "Nicey" Nice (left) and Mike "Smashie" Smash (right)

Smashie and Nicey are comedy characters who first appeared in the early 1990s TV sketch show Harry Enfield's Television Programme. They were played by the comedians Paul Whitehouse and Harry Enfield respectively.

They are parodies of a certain style of ageing celebrity Radio 1 disc jockey who started out with the station in the 1960s and stayed until the mid-1990s. The characters incorporated personalities, character traits and lives of several real DJs. The characters reference such DJs as Tony Blackburn, Dave Lee Travis, Simon Bates, Alan Freeman, Mike Read, Peter Powell, Noel Edmonds and Jimmy Savile. Enfield's parody of Radio 1's increasing irrelevance to the youth audience it supposedly catered for was a factor in Matthew Bannister's decision to terminate the employment of many older presenters when he became controller of Radio 1 in 1993.

The characters had a TV special in 1994, following which Enfield retired them, reflecting the changes at Radio 1. They returned for Comic Relief in 1997. Whitehouse and Enfield also reprised their roles to present a special edition of Pick of the Pops in 2007, commemorating the 40th birthday of Radio 2, following the death of Alan Freeman. They have been called "one of the great comic creations of our time".

== Development ==
Harry Enfield stated that his choice of characters for his show was a calculated move to gain the biggest possible audience by creating archetypes people could relate to. Whereas he aimed many of his characters at a young audience, Smashie and Nicey were created for a segment of the programme designed to appeal to "older people". Enfield described them as "a bit more highbrow" than the other characters.

== Character profile ==
Smashie and Nicey are Mike Smash and Dave Nice, two middle-aged disc jockeys at "Radio Fab FM" – a thin-veiled parody of Radio 1 – who have been with the station since the 1960s. During their appearances as recurring characters on Harry Enfield's Television Programme, the pair host neighbouring mid-morning slots, with each sketch typically about the cliched and insipid banter during Smashie's handover to Nicey's show, with self-congratulory references to their charity work (which they pronounce as "charidee"). Every sketch ends with Nicey using an oversized fader to play his favourite (albeit dated) record "You Ain't Seen Nothin' Yet" by Bachman–Turner Overdrive, which he usually introduces with a bad pun on the band's name. The characters' personalities were parodies of older Radio 1 DJs, who were widely perceived as being out of touch with the younger audiences that the station was intended to appeal to.

At the end of the second series, the new controller of Fab FM attempts to rejuvenate the station's dated image by demoting Smashie and Nicey to a midnight graveyard slot on sister channel "Radio Quiet" (a parody of Radio 2), with their usual morning shows being handed over to fresh-faced DJs Mark Baddier and Simon Christ (parodies of younger presenters of the time, such as Mark Goodier and Simon Mayo), who prove to be even more inane than their older counterparts. Smashie and Nicey are finally sacked from Fab FM in their TV special End of an Era, that marks the end of their careers as mainstream radio personalities.

=== Mike Smash ===
Mike Smash (Smashie, played by Paul Whitehouse) is a bland and lightweight DJ who fills his airtime with terrible jokes and moronic observations of no consequence. Despite his chirpy personality, he is incredibly vain and egotistical, often viewing himself in Biblical proportions. Smashie disingenuously cultivates a humble, inoffensive public image, pretending that he "doesn't like to talk about" his supposedly extensive charity work (instead preferring to pressure Nicey into regularly mentioning it) and claiming never to have used any intoxicating substances, which is contradicted several times by Nicey. He is also shown to enjoy teasing Nicey over his closeted homosexuality and comparatively unimpressive career. Smashie lives on a farm in Frensham, though he knows absolutely nothing about farming.

In End of an Era, Smashie is shown to be a lonely, maladjusted man-child who has no close friends and has never recovered from his troubled childhood and failed marriage. After being sacked from Radio Fab FM, he attempts to reinvent himself as a laddish TV presenter (in the style of Mark Lamarr and Terry Christian); remarries to a much younger trophy wife; and accumulates a net worth of £200 million through Bulgarian property holdings. In the 2015 stage show Harry Enfield and Paul Whitehouse: Legends!, Smashie and Nicey are both arrested during Operation Yewtree for historic sexual misconduct, though in his last appearance on UKTV Gold's Smashie's Xmastastic Playlist, it is claimed that Smashie is asexual and has "never had any sexual thoughts ever".

=== Dave Nice ===
Dave Nice (Nicey, played by Harry Enfield) is a flamboyant, old-school DJ whose tastes are stuck in the 1970s, with a love of outdated classic rock. Nicey styles himself as straight-talking and down-to-earth, though his radio material is usually just as witless as Smashie's. At times he is slightly more insightful and self-aware than Smashie, but still has a delusional sense of self-importance, believing himself to be of much greater social significance than he is. He becomes noticeably more opinionated as the characters progress, his views typically being insensitive and out of touch. Nicey often refers to spending time with various young male "friends", but is still closeted. He lives in a huge mansion in Buckinghamshire, decorated with gaudy and tasteless art of himself.

In End of an Era, Nicey is revealed to be a miserable, self-loathing alcoholic, and drunkenly confesses that he actually despises Smashie. In later materials, his career declines considerably: he is reduced to a midnight slot "Radio Antique", and DJs on Sundays at an ice rink in Penge. In Harry Enfield's Television Programme, Nicey's full name was Davenport Nice, but during a guest appearance on Pick of the Pops, it was claimed that he is actually of Russian Jewish origin and that his birth name was Davidovich Nicenstein. Following Smashie and Nicey's arrests during Operation Yewtree, Nicey is said to be "quite possibly in prison" as of 2017.

== Appearances ==
The characters first appeared in Harry Enfield's Television Programme in 1990 and continued to appear in the second series and a 1994 special entitled Smashie & Nicey: End of an Era.

The characters became very popular, appearing in adverts, featuring on their own compilation album, Let's Rock, and presenting episodes of Top of the Pops, including the 30th anniversary special edition on New Year's Day 1994. They were dropped by Enfield in 1995 after the changes at Radio 1 had removed the need for such satire, although they returned for Comic Relief in 1997.

Paul Whitehouse and Harry Enfield also reprised their roles to present a special edition of Pick of the Pops on 30 September 2007, commemorating the 40th birthday of Radio 2 and following the death of Alan Freeman. Dale Winton made the opening announcement but was quickly evicted by Smashie and Nicey who proceeded to play the top 40 from 27 September 1967. During the show Nicey accidentally came out as gay (which was previously alluded to in the 1994 special, and may be an allusion to Alan Freeman's admission, also in 1994, that he had been bisexual before he became celibate). At the end of the show, he emotionally begged the Controller of BBC Radio to give him a job, "even if it's only on [fictional station] Digital Radio 8".

Nicey briefly appeared in the 2015 special An Evening with Harry Enfield and Paul Whitehouse, revealing that he had been cleared of "all but one of the charges" by Operation Yewtree, echoing what had happened to Dave Lee Travis.

Whitehouse reprised the role of Smashie for a two-part special Smashie's Xmastastic Playlist, which aired on Gold on 23 and 24 December 2017. It is revealed in these specials that Smashie is asexual.

=== 1994 TV special ===
A TV special named Smashie and Nicey: The End of an Era was shown on BBC1 in 1994. The special begins in the 1960s, with Nicey presenting Blue Peter and dancing on stage with Freddie and the Dreamers in doctored footage of the band's appearance on the show performing "You Were Made for Me", interviewing The Beatles, and becoming a DJ on offshore station Radio Geraldine (Radio Caroline), where Smashie is initially his teaboy. It combines elements from the careers of several real DJs, with Smashie seen hosting a Saturday night TV show called Smashie's House Party, a parody of Noel's House Party, and having turned his show into a plea for his wife (named specifically as "Tessa") to come back after she has left him, repeatedly playing Bobby Goldsboro's "Honey" (Tony Blackburn did this in the mid-1970s when his wife, actress Tessa Wyatt left him).

Nicey is revealed to have advertised "Deptford Dralons", alluding to Alan Freeman's ads for Brentford Nylons, to have interviewed the Sex Pistols (in doctored footage of their famous interview with Bill Grundy) and to have fronted The Dave Nice Video Show, a parody of The Kenny Everett Video Show. The duo are also said to have performed on the Band Aid single "Do They Know It's Christmas?". Freeman himself makes a cameo appearance, as do Blackburn, David Jensen and John Peel. The programme was repeated on BBC Two in August 2015, however, some material (such as Smashie asking a member of the Top of the Pops audience how old she was) was edited out.

== Influence on Radio 1 ==
The sketches proved popular, largely because they reflected the image that Radio 1 had at the time. Much of the station's output was widely considered dull and unchallenging, and the average age of both listeners and presenters had risen above thirty, when it was intended to cater to a young audience.

When Matthew Bannister arrived at Radio 1 in 1993 with a mission to rejuvenate the station, he referred directly to the characters in stating that his goal was to rid it of its "Smashie and Nicey image". Paul Whitehouse said he was congratulated by the then-BBC Director-General John Birt at a 90s award ceremony for assisting in the process of revamping Radio 1.

[Birt] said, "Oh well done, thanks for giving me the idea about the DJs. Now I can get rid of them." And [Whitehouse] said, "We actually quite like their rambling antics."

On 8 August 1993, Dave Lee Travis, one of the station's DJs at the time, resigned on air during his Sunday morning show stating that he could not agree with changes that were being made to Radio 1. Travis told his audience that changes were afoot that he could not tolerate "and I really want to put the record straight at this point and I thought you ought to know – changes are being made here which go against my principles and I just cannot agree with them". He later commented on the characters in Q magazine, saying: "This Smashie and Nicey crap that they keep bringing up. Is that funny? It doesn't raise a smile with me."

== See also ==
- BBC Radio 1 in the 1990s
- Harry Enfield & Chums
