= Harry Enfield & Chums =

British TV sketch comedy series (1990–1998)

- Also known as: Harry Enfield's Television Programme
- Genre: Sketch comedy
- Written by: Harry Enfield; Charlie Higson; Geoffrey Perkins; Ian Hislop; Paul Whitehouse; Nick Newman
- Starring: Harry Enfield; Paul Whitehouse; Kathy Burke; David Barber; Gary Bleasdale; Martin Clunes; Aden Gillett; Jon Glover; Charlie Higson; Rupert Holliday-Evans; Joe McGann; Stephen Moore; Mark Moraghan; Nathaniel Parker; Duncan Preston; Caroline Quentin; Louisa Rix; Julia St John; Carla Mendonça
- Country of origin: United Kingdom
- Original language: English
- No. of series: 5
- No. of episodes: 28

Production
- Production location: Limehouse Studios (1990–92)
- Running time: 30 minutes (40 minutes Christmas specials)
- Production companies: Hat Trick Productions (1990–92); Tiger Aspect Productions (1994–98)

Original release
- Network: BBC2
- Release: 8 November 1990 – 24 December 1992
- Network: BBC1
- Release: 4 November 1994 – 28 December 1998

Related
- Harry Enfield's Brand Spanking New Show

Harry Enfield & Chums (originally titled Harry Enfield's Television Programme) is a British sketch show starring Harry Enfield, Paul Whitehouse and Kathy Burke. It first broadcast on BBC2 in 1990 in the 9 pm slot on Thursdays, which became the traditional time for alternative comedy on television.

Enfield was already an established name owing to his "Loadsamoney" character (which featured in a few entertainment programmes in the late 1980s), but the series gave greater presence to his frequent collaborators Whitehouse and Burke – so much so that, in 1994, the show was retitled Harry Enfield & Chums. In 2001, a clip show series titled Harry Enfield Presents aired, which featured compilations of sketches from the series featuring new linking material recorded by Enfield in character.

== History ==
Harry Enfield's Television Programme was written by Enfield, Whitehouse, Charlie Higson and Geoffrey Perkins, and broadcast on BBC2. The original series titles began with Enfield in a black suit walking towards the camera and blowing two raspberries to the music of a brass band, standing still while the camera showed the upper half of his right side, then flipped to the left side, then simultaneously rotated and zoomed in before ending with a full body shot of him taking a quick drag from a cigarette hidden behind his back. The show ran for two series with this title in late 1990 and spring 1992. A Christmas special titled Harry Enfield's Festive Television Programme was broadcast on Christmas Eve 1992.

A special, Smashie & Nicey: End of an Era, aired at Easter 1994, which retired the characters of Smashie and Nicey.

After the original series, there were a couple of radio appearances. During the period between series, Enfield concentrated on straight acting parts, and Whitehouse worked on other projects.

Through repeats, the characters proved popular, and in 1994, the BBC commissioned a new series called Harry Enfield & Chums, this time broadcast on BBC1. This series was produced with a pool of writers, rather than the cast alone. The format of the opening credits was the same, although Enfield was now joined by co-stars Whitehouse and Burke to take a collective bow to the audience. Two Christmas specials of Harry Enfield & Chums were produced for 1997 and 1998. These were titled Harry Enfield & Christmas Chums and Harry Enfield's Yule Log Chums, respectively.

For Christmas 1999, and in advance of the forthcoming Kevin & Perry Go Large film, a clip show episode called Harry Enfield Presents Kevin's Guide to Being a Teenager was broadcast. The clip show format was revisited in 2001 with a series of six further Harry Enfield Presents episodes based around individual characters or premises. The episodes in the series were:

- Tim Nice-but-Dim's Guide to Being a Bloody Nice Bloke
- Wayne and Waynetta's Guide to Wedded Bliss
- Guide to Family Values
- Look, Listen and Take Heed
- The North of England
- Guide to Being a Senior Citizen

== Episodes ==
Series	Episodes	Originally aired	
Series	Episodes	First in the series	Last in the series
Harry Enfield's Television Programme Series 1	6	8 November 1990	13 December 1990
Harry Enfield's Television Programme Series 2	6	2 April 1992	7 May 1992
Harry Enfield & Chums Series 1	6	4 November 1994	16 December 1994
Harry Enfield & Chums Series 2	6	7 January 1997	11 February 1997
Harry Enfield Presents	6	5 January 2001	30 October 2001

In addition to the main series, the following Christmas and one-off specials were broadcast:

Harry Enfield's Festive Television Programme was broadcast 24 December 1992.

Smashie & Nicey: End of an Era was broadcast 4 April 1994.

Harry Enfield & Christmas Chums was broadcast 24 December 1997.

Harry Enfield's Yule Log Chums was broadcast 28 December 1998.

Harry Enfield Presents Kevin's Guide to Being a Teenager was broadcast 27 December 1999.

== Recurring characters and sketches ==
=== Harry Enfield's Television Programme Series 1 ===
The following characters and recurring sketches appear for the first time in series 1 of Harry Enfield's Television Programme. In series 1, they are often introduced with title cards announcing the name of the character or sketch.

==== The Boressszzzzz ====
Two uninteresting middle-aged men, Jeff and Geoff Bore (Harry Enfield and Simon Godley), who frequently engage in dull and witless banter, revolving around bland topics such as their cars and local theatre, typically punctuated by obnoxious laughter at their own jokes.

==== Doctor Dolittle, He Talks to the Animals ====
A vulgar parody of Doctor Dolittle (Enfield), in which he communicates with animals through verbal abuse and profanity.

==== The Double-take Brothers ====
Two brothers (Enfield and Rupert Holliday-Evans) with an irritating propensity for exaggerated double takes whenever something obvious or mundane occurs, such as having to queue at a post office, yet fail to react when something genuinely shocking and unexpected happens, such as being attacked by a shark or hit by a car.

==== Fat Bloke ====
A fat, jolly-looking man (David Barber) who made his first appearance in a "Lee and Lance" sketch. He later formed a running gag where, for no apparent reason, he would walk into the middle of a sketch, hand something to a character (usually appropriate to the situation), be told "Thank you, Fat Bloke!", and walk off. In the first series of Harry Enfield & Chums, he would be introduced at the end of the closing credits by Enfield who would announce: "The show's not over until the Fat Bloke sings!" whereupon he would sing a song (ranging from "Lord of the Dance" to "Smack My Bitch Up") in operatic style.

==== Freddie & Jack ====
A pair of Labour and Conservative MPs (Enfield) who live together and are unable to perform any menial household tasks without descending into petty and childish political arguments which usually have nothing to do with the task at hand. The final sketch featured a guest appearance by David Steel, a prominent Liberal Democrat MP at the time, against whom Freddie and Jack unite during a birthday party. Certain elements of Enfield's character were carried over into the later character Tory Boy. This sketch has become more dated than most due to Freddie's frequent references to the EEC.

==== George Integrity Whitebread ====
George (Enfield) is a stereotypical, insensitive, plain-speaking Yorkshireman; unfortunately, he usually finds himself in a position of responsibility requiring creativity and sensitivity. When he is first introduced, it is stated with approval by the other characters in the sketch that "Integrity is his middle name", only for them to discover that this is only true in a literal sense.

==== Lee and Lance ====
Two idiots (Enfield and Paul Whitehouse) who work variously as mechanics, builders, and stall holders, and have inane conversations about a range of topics, confidently exposing their own ignorance. Lance is completely moronic (though surprisingly proficient in opera singing), whereas Lee is slightly smarter, but not by much.

==== Little Brother ====
Kevin (Enfield) is an annoying, hyperactive twelve-year-old boy with a minuscule attention-span; constantly pestering his older brother and parents by making immature jokes, insensitive remarks, and repeatedly referencing Blackadder ("Bloody hell, Baldrick!").

In Harry Enfield & Chums, on Kevin's 13th birthday his personality suddenly changes to become "Kevin the Teenager".

==== Mr. Cholmondley-Warner ====
A snobbish, upper-crust 1930s newsreel presenter (played by Jon Glover). Miles Cholmondley-Warner (/ˈtʃʌmli/ CHUM-lee), with his manservant Greyson (Enfield), would expound on various issues of the day and attempt to uphold the British Empire's values. In the second series of Chums, in the absence of Glover, this gave way to a series of public information films that would advise, amongst other things, that women refrain from driving and participating in complex conversations (as this would lead to insanity) or that babies be given gin to ensure a good night's sleep. The characters also appeared in a series of TV adverts for Mercury Communications, where they were introduced by Grayson's wife (portrayed by Felicity Montagu). The sketch Women: Know Your Limits! was plagiarised by a Danish PR agency in a campaign video for the 2009 Danish Act of Succession referendum. Some other sketches within the show also use the 1930s newsreel format but are not connected to any specific character. In keeping with the setting, the brief piece of music that introduced these segments was "Calling All Workers" by Eric Coates, a piece that had previously been used as the theme to Music While You Work, a wartime and post-war BBC radio show.

==== The Old Gits ====
A pair of cruel and bitter old men, Fred and Alf Git (Enfield and Whitehouse), who only derive joy from inflicting misery on others. Even just the thought of upsetting or inconveniencing other people is enough to entertain them, as they habitually imagine twisted hypotheticals involving their neighbours, families, and even each other. The characters re-appeared in Harry Enfield & Chums, albeit with their names swapped to avoid confusion with The Fast Show character Unlucky Alf, also played by Whitehouse.

==== The Palace of Righteous Justice ====
A superhero team, consisting of Law Man (Enfield), Fire Man (Parker), and Kometh the Iceman (Aden Gillett), who attempt to solve everyday problems such as opening a bank account through use of their destructive superpowers, invariably ending in chaos. The day is always then "saved" by a fourth member of the team, She Woman Cat Type Thing, who does nothing but regurgitate fur balls or lick herself.

==== Sergei and Vincent ====
Russian and Dutch tourists (Enfield and Whitehouse) with an optimistic outlook on the world and a taste in rock music.

==== The Scousers ====
Gary, Barry, and Terry (Enfield, Joe McGann and Gary Bleasdale) are three stereotypical Liverpudlians with incredibly short tempers, constantly challenging each other to fights over perceived slights and insults which they read into everything. They are also shown to be petty criminals, occasionally discussing their thieving and joyriding exploits, and in one sketch they attempt to rob a building society. Their catchphrases are "Dey do dough, don't dey dough" ("They do though, don't they though") and "Alright! Alright! Calm down, calm down", said by one of the trio when the other two start arguing.

The characters returned in Harry Enfield & Chums, with McGann replaced by Mark Moraghan.

==== The Slobs (Wayne and Waynetta) ====
A benefit-dependent, lower-class couple (Enfield and Kathy Burke) with a lack of personal hygiene who spend most of their time smoking cigarettes or eating pizzas. Wayne and Waynetta argue constantly over everything, including the name of their child, whom they eventually name Frogmella because "it's exotic". Later, another daughter is named Spudulika after Waynetta's favourite fast-food franchise Spudulike. A third child, which Waynetta calls Canoe (supposedly named after actor Keanu Reeves), was born of an affair Wayne had with Naomi Campbell which resulted in octuplets. Canoe completes the family with the "brown baby" Waynetta always wanted (since all the other mothers on the estate had one). The couple win the lottery and also win a holiday; but the aircraft crashes because they are so overweight, and they end up stranded in the jungle. The Slobs were derived both from one of Burke's stand-up skits and a couple with a similar lifestyle who lived in the flat below Enfield in his younger days.

==== Smashie and Nicey ====
Nicey (Enfield) and Smashie (Whitehouse)

Dave Nice and Mike Smash (Enfield and Whitehouse, respectively) are two veteran DJs for the fictional radio station "Fab FM" (a parody of early 1990s BBC Radio 1), whose on-air rapport consists almost entirely of insipid observations, corny jokes, and gratuitous references to their charity work (which they pronounce as "charidee"). Their musical tastes are also hopelessly outdated, with every sketch ending with Nicey playing "You Ain't Seen Nothing Yet" by Bachman-Turner Overdrive, usually accompanied by a bad pun on the band's name. The characters were broadly based on Radio 1 DJs of the time, such as Mike Read, Simon Bates, and Tony Blackburn, who were perceived as being out of touch with younger audiences.

At the end of the second series, Smashie and Nicey are demoted from their morning show to a graveyard slot on "Radio Quiet", which was then followed by the two being sacked in an hour-long 1994 special Smashie and Nicey: The End of an Era. The characters did not return for Harry Enfield & Chums, but Enfield and Whitehouse reprised the roles in a series of adverts for Fab ice lollies, a special edition of Pick of the Pops on BBC Radio 2 in 2007, and stage shows. Whitehouse also reprised the character of Smashie for a Christmas playlist on UKTV Gold.

==== Tim Nice-but-Dim Esq. ====
An upper-class twit (Enfield) who is usually being ripped off by one of his "jolly nice" chums from his prep or public school days. He is an exaggerated version of "posh" yet pleasant and stupid people that Enfield knew. He is a fictional Old Ardinian (an alumnus of Ardingly College) with an eccentric public school-influenced dress sense involving jeans and a blazer worn over a striped rugby shirt. The character was initially created by Ian Hislop and Nick Newman, who are both Old Ardinians. They wrote the character as an antidote to contemporary portrayals of ex-public schoolboys as sharp-minded, high-achieving young men, and instead chose to base the character on former school contemporaries who had "plenty of money and good manners" but were "light of intellect". Tim's catchphrase is "What an absolutely, thoroughly, bloody nice bloke!" A notable scene was him going to a school reunion at the wrong school.

The character appeared in TV adverts promoting British meat in the late 1990s and early 2000s. The adverts were pulled because of the 2001 foot-and-mouth crisis. The character returned as Tim Nice-But-Balding in the third series of Harry & Paul, episode four, in a Dragon's Den parody sketch. He represents a city banker, and it is revealed that Adam Jarvis is his brother. Tim has many things in common with Prince Charles and was briefly engaged to a woman with a similar personality who has a strong resemblance to Diana Windsor. However, neither character was meant to be a direct parody.

==== "You Don't Want to Do It Like That" ====
An infuriating know-it-all father who advised various people with both household tasks and diverse jobs, such as a football pundit. This was Enfield's take on the traditional "mother-in-law" stereotype. His catchphrase, on encountering someone, or entering a room is "Only me!" When his interfering goes wrong, he tends to blame everyone but himself, using the catchphrase "Now I do not believe you wanted to do that, did you?"

=== Harry Enfield's Television Programme Series 2 ===
The following characters and recurring sketches appear for the first time in series 2 of Harry Enfield's Television Programme.

==== Leslie Norris ====
A chronically absent-minded pub landlord (Enfield) who is easily confused and has an incredibly short memory, frequently mixing up his anecdotes, customers' orders, and forgetting things that happened just moments before.

==== English for Aliens ====
A sketch presented in the style of edutainment programming, in which an unseen narrator attempts to teach three excitable and childlike aliens (dressed in human attire) various English words and phrases but grows frustrated as they arbitrarily repeat certain words and are constantly distracted by irrelevancies.

==== Rugby Fans ====
Three boisterous, drunken, public-schooled rugby enthusiasts (Enfield, Clunes, and Gillett) who loudly break out into nonsensical and vulgar drinking songs at every opportunity, and generally torment those around them.

=== Harry Enfield & Chums Series 1 ===
The following characters and recurring sketches appear for the first time in series 1 of Harry Enfield & Chums.

==== Dr Philip Boyish Good Looks ====
A blond softly spoken TV doctor. He is often seen on a morning show couch, reading letters from "menopausal women" about their fantasies of him. He seems to take an unusually large number of showers per day. In one sketch he reveals he has been "struck off" as a doctor.

==== Kevin the Teenager ====
A continuation of the "Little Brother" sketches in Harry Enfield's Television Programme, in which Kevin (Enfield) undergoes a major personality change immediately upon turning thirteen, becoming lethargic, stroppy, and overly sensitive. Though he is no longer hyperactive, he continues to annoy his parents through his constant complaining and refusal to do anything they tell him. He is often joined by his best friend Perry (Burke), who is faultlessly polite to Kevin's parents but rude to his own; Kevin mirrors this attitude by being similarly polite in the presence of Perry's parents, in contrast to his usual horrible behaviour.

Kevin proved to be a popular character, receiving a VHS special Harry Enfield Presents: Kevin's Guide to Being a Teenager, as well as a feature film, Kevin and Perry Go Large, in 2000.

==== The Lovely Wobbly Randy Old Ladies ====
A deliberate contrast, on Enfield's part, to show the opposite of "The Old Gits": Two lecherous old ladies who do not care who approaches them so long as the newcomer is male and good looking. Their catchphrase is "Ooh! Young man!", which they repeat in an attempt to pass themselves off as "nice little old ladies", while comparing young men they encounter to male celebrities of their young adulthood ("You're the spitting image of a young Lester Piggott"). They also intentionally misinterpret comments made to them as being sexual and flirtatiously tell the victim off for saying it. As the series progresses, they begin creating elaborate plans to get men, which often involve abduction.

==== Michael Paine ====
Michael Paine is a self-confessed "nosy neighbour". Played by Whitehouse in the style of Michael Caine as parodied by Peter Sellers in his famous appearance on Parkinson in the early 1970s. The parody is in part based on Caine's character from The Italian Job, a film released in 1969 and much loved by British audiences ("I told you, you're only supposed to blow the bloody doors off!") and his diction when presenting his lines in many of his films. It relies on Caine's ability to impart trivial information in the same way, starting with "Did you know..." and ending with ".. and not a lot of people know that.". Whitehouse continues in this tradition, talking about extremely mundane things his neighbours were doing such as "do you know, he didn't call that woman back until... approximately two hours later. Would Damon Hill have taken that long to call his mother? I'll be honest with you. I don't know. Not a lot of people know I don't know that, but I don't." All of his anecdotes involve other people on the street, and his information is gained from eavesdropping and spying on them.

==== Perry Carter ====
Kevin's best friend, despite acting different to Kevin's parents. He acts exactly like Kevin to his parents, same goes for Kevin himself.

==== The Self-Righteous Brothers ====
Cockney brothers Frank and George Doberman (Enfield and Whitehouse) sit in a pub, speculating about what would happen if they met various celebrities and public figures, whom they exclusively refer to by their surnames (e.g. "Black" for Cilla Black). These imaginary situations usually begin pleasantly but inevitably turn sour as Frank and George begin to conjure up various implausible and outrageous ways in which the celebrity might misbehave, causing the brothers to become enraged at their own hypothetical imaginings.

In the first series, the Doberman brothers essentially share the same personality; however, in the second series George is portrayed as a straight man to Frank's increasingly psychotic outbursts. One sketch featured a cameo appearance from British Formula One driver Damon Hill, to whom Frank is initially polite, before becoming aggressive upon imagining Hill driving through his neighbourhood at 140 mph.

In 1998 the characters were featured in an advert for Hula Hoops. In 2014, Enfield and Whitehouse reprised the roles of Frank and George in a sketch for Channel 4's The Feeling Nuts Comedy Night. The name of this sketch parodies the musical duo The Righteous Brothers.

==== Stan and Pam Herbert ====
An affluent couple who spoke with exaggerated Black Country accents and were forever informing people that "We are considerably richer than yow!" Many sketches involved the couple patronising another couple of similar age, desperate to convince the other couple (Pam's sister and her husband in a couple of sketches) that their greater wealth meant greater happiness or social importance, and their inability to accept the successes or talents of others as being noteworthy (such as the British couple they meet on a Spanish holiday who, fluent in Spanish, are dismissed as "showing off"). Unfortunately, Stan's determination to show off his wealth is matched by his fury when he comes across someone "considerably" richer than him, such as when they try to boast while on holiday to a scruffily dressed man who turns out to own the hotel they are staying in, or when their in-laws win the lottery and become multimillionaires.

=== Harry Enfield & Chums Series 2 ===
The following characters and recurring sketches appear for the first time in series 2 of Harry Enfield & Chums.

==== Arguing Couple ====
A married couple (played by Enfield and Julia St John) who quite clearly have grown to despise each other, stuck in a seemingly endless argument which consists of them constantly flinging insults at each other (often to the embarrassment or irritation of others), yet will not separate or get a divorce for the sake of their son David.

==== Big Bob Joylove ====
Based on the TV series Lovejoy. A shady-looking man who in each sketch faces a problem or disappointment and attempts to bribe someone who has no control of the situation, including paying a station guard to confirm his missed train had not arrived yet, and a nurse to confirm his newborn daughter is a boy. His catchphrases were "Oh, I getcha!" and "You drive a hard bargain, don't you?", always followed by Bob offering more money to his harassed victim.

==== The Dutch Coppers ====
Two gay Dutch policemen who speak directly to the camera in a parody of police documentaries. They are more interested in smoking marijuana, flirting and making gay innuendo than doing any police work. A parody of liberal attitudes in the Netherlands.

==== Jockeys ====
Enfield plays a jockey whose horse effortlessly outruns another played by Ewen Bremner, much to Bremner's annoyance. Enfield also constantly makes inane conversation whilst running alongside him.

==== Julio Geordio ====
Whitehouse portrays a Colombian footballer who has recently joined Newcastle United and speaks in a mixture of Spanish and Geordie. He is always interviewed by the same pundit (Enfield as a parody of John Motson in his iconic sheepskin jacket). As the series progresses, Julio develops more of a Geordie accent as he describes events on and off the field, the latter often involving "liaisons" with pin-up girls of the time such as The Spice Girls and Dani Behr. When the pundit becomes aware that Julio is telling an inappropriate story, he tries in vain to get him back on track. Julio is probably inspired by the arrival of Faustino Asprilla at Newcastle United in 1995 when South American players joining English clubs was rare.

==== Jürgen the German ====
A young German tourist (Enfield) visiting England, whose attempts to make friendly conversation with people he encounters turn out awkward and stilted, exposing his underdeveloped sense of humour and frustrations at perceived inefficiencies of British society (such as buses being a few minutes late). Out of the blue, he will also profusely apologise for his country's actions during the war but will break out into aggressive Nazi-style rants when rebuked.

==== Harry and Lulu the Toddlers ====
A toddler and his baby sister played by Enfield and Burke on oversized sets. Harry deliberately hurts Lulu, or more often tricks her into hurting herself, but then plays the innocent when their mother arrives to investigate, and asks for a "big hug", but their mother does not accept his apologies. On Channel 4's Sunday Night Project on 8 February 2009, Enfield revealed the characters were based on a young Lily and Alfie Allen (as adults, a singer and actor, respectively); at the time of their being toddlers, he was dating their mother, producer Alison Owen.

==== Mister Dead the Talking Corpse ====
Parody of the US TV sitcom Mister Ed, with the talking horse replaced by a talking corpse in a casket, played by Whitehouse.

==== Modern Dad ====
An old-fashioned father, looking and sounding suspiciously like Enfield's own, who struggles to accept his son's homosexuality. While he does make a genuine effort, he often makes tactless remarks and Freudian slips ("Make yourself at homo... er, at HOME!") and judgements based on stereotypes. For example, going up to a pink Fiat Panda that he assumed was his son's car or offering to order Babycham at the local pub. As the series progresses, the son becomes increasingly frustrated by his father's behaviour around his boyfriend. The boyfriend's name is initially "Dominic" but changes to "David", though this was only revealed for the purposes of a joke acknowledging that the role had been recast. "Dominic" is played by Ewen Bremner in several episodes.

==== Tory Boy ====
A repulsive thirteen-year-old with glaringly out-of-date ideas about the world, based on a cross between a snobbish, unpopular boy who went to school with Enfield, and a younger version of William Hague. Enfield also claimed to have mixed more recent Conservative politicians such as Michael Howard and Michael Portillo together in the character, on the allegation that they were "Tory Boys who have never grown up." Became "Tony Boy" (a parody of Tony Blair) after the 1997 general election.

=== Other sketches ===
==== William Ulsterman and "Gerry" ====
A one-off sketch where Harry parodies both ex-Democratic Unionist Party (DUP) leader Rev Ian Paisley and Sinn Féin president Gerry Adams at a house party. William is loud-mouthed and becomes increasingly rude and insulting towards the host (Brigit Forsyth) when she is unable to provide him with his desired canapé of cheese-and-pineapple-on-a-stick. When he has finished his rant, the host awkwardly turns away approaches an unnamed guest who is very clearly supposed to be Adams. While this second guest is smiley and charismatic, his gestures indicate his anecdote has a violent double-meaning. Enfield has since explained that the sketch was loosely based on an abandoned idea called "The Gerry Adams Family", claiming that no one else wanted to do it in case it caused offence.

== Home Media releases and availability ==
=== VHS ===
- "Harry Enfield's Television Programme: The Very Best of Series One"
- "Harry Enfield's Television Programme: Series Two - Part One"
- "Harry Enfield's Television Programme: Series Two - Part Two"
- "Harry Enfield & Chums" (Contains some of the best sketches from Series 1)
- "Harry Enfield & Chums 1997" (Contains some of the best sketches from Series 2. This video was released in advance of the series airing on BBC One.)
- "The New Harry Enfield and Chums Video - Oi No!" (Contains an extended version Harry Enfield and Christmas Chums 1997 Special with previously unseen sketches)
- "More Harry Enfield and Chums" (Contains Harry Enfield's Yule Log Chums 1998 Christmas Special)
- "Harry Enfield Presents Kevin's Guide to Being a Teenager (Christmas special from 1999, later included on Kevin & Perry Go Large DVD.)

=== Cancelled DVD Releases ===
Harry Enfield and Chums: The Complete Collection was due to be released as a two-disc DVD on 21 May 2007, but it was delayed until further notice. It was then to be released on 19 November 2012 but was delayed once again to 11 March 2013 before being cancelled.

Harry Enfield: The Collection was going to be a five-disc set containing both series of Harry Enfield's Television Programme, Harry Enfield's Festive Television Programme, both series of Harry Enfield & Chums, Harry Enfield & Christmas Chums and Harry Enfield's Yule Log Chums.

=== Streaming ===
Harry Enfield's Television Programme (series 1 and 2) is currently available on Netflix UK.

== Legacy ==
In 2000, Enfield and Burke starred in a feature film based around the Kevin the Teenager character titled Kevin & Perry Go Large.

Enfield and Whitehouse reunited for sketch shows Harry Enfield's Brand Spanking New Show in 2000 and Ruddy Hell! It's Harry & Paul in 2007, the latter of which ran for four series, with a completely new range of characters.
