= Harry Enfield =

English comedy actor and writer (born 1961)

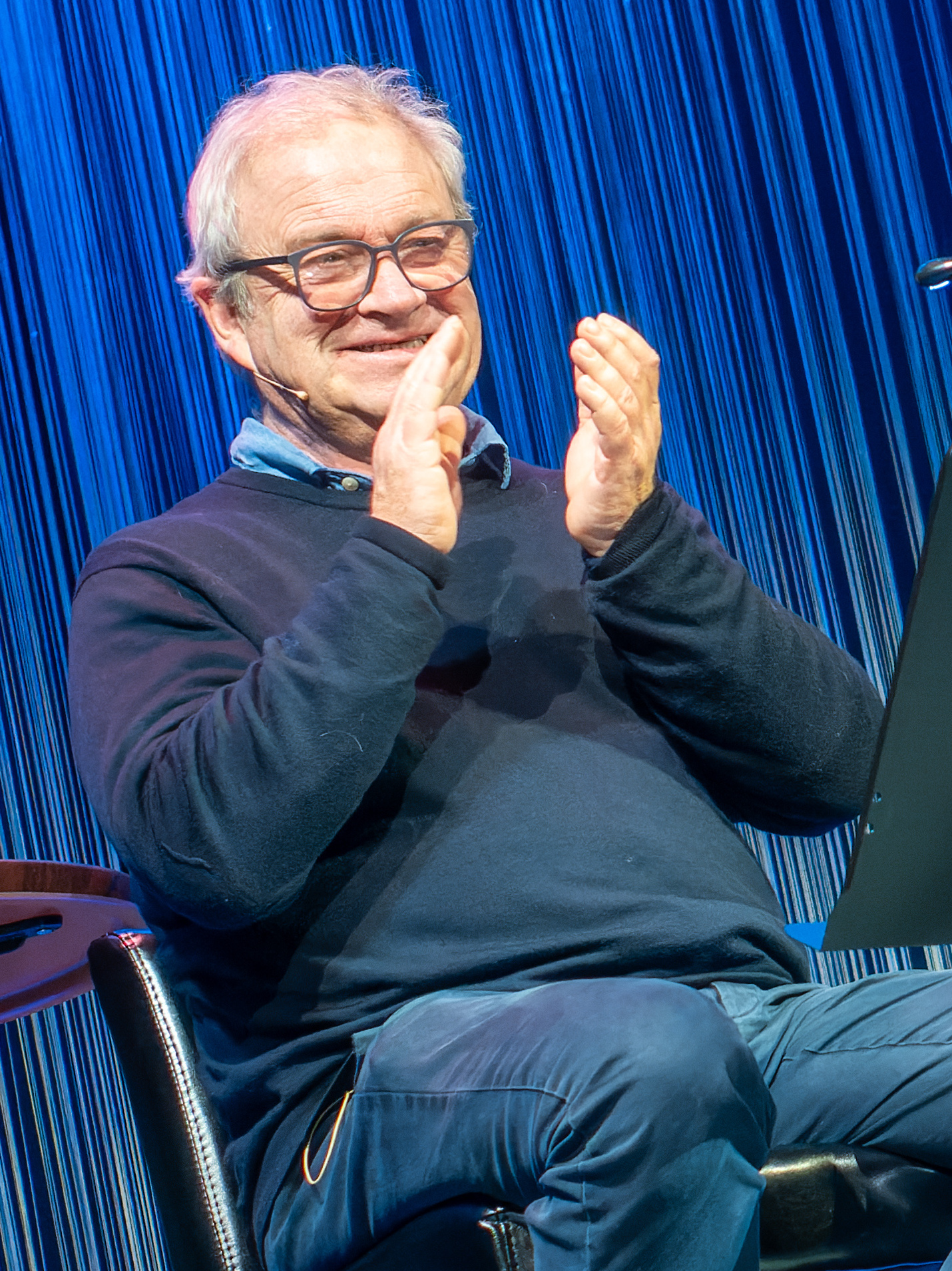
- Enfield in 2023
- Born: Henry Richard Enfield; 30 May 1961 (age 65); Horsham, Sussex, England
- Education: Dorset House School; Worth School; Collyer's Sixth Form College; University of York
- Spouse: Lucy Lyster (m. 1997; sep. 2020)
- Children: 3
- Parent: Edward Enfield

Comedy career
- Years active: 1984–present
- Medium: Television; film; stand-up
- Genres: Sketch shows; character comedy; satire

Henry Richard Enfield (born 30 May 1961) is an English comedy actor and writer known in particular for his television work. His shows include Harry Enfield's Television Programme, Harry Enfield & Chums and Harry & Paul, in which he created and portrayed characters such as Kevin the Teenager, Loadsamoney, Smashie and Nicey, The Scousers, Tim Nice-But-Dim and Mr "You Don't Want to Do It Like That".

== Early life and education ==
Enfield was born on 30 May 1961, in Horsham, Sussex, and is the eldest of four children (and only son) of English television, radio and newspaper journalist and presenter Edward Enfield and his wife, Deirdre Jenkins. The Enfield family are descendants of the nineteenth-century philanthropist Edward Enfield. Enfield's maternal grandparents were originally from Youghal, County Cork, Ireland. He spent his childhood living in Billingshurst, West Sussex.

Enfield was privately educated at the Arundale School in Pulborough, Dorset House School, Worth School, and Collyer's Sixth Form College, shortly after it became a comprehensive school. He studied politics at the University of York, where he was a member of Derwent College, York. He squatted in Hackney and worked as a milkman for a while.

== Career ==
Enfield started his comedy career after being recruited at the Edinburgh Fringe Festival, as a writer for 3 episodes of the Radio 4 comedy programme Week Ending (1982-1983). In 1985, he took on a voice actor role alongside Chris Barrie, Rory Bremner, Steve Coogan, Hugh Dennis, and Ade Edmondson in the British satirical television comedy puppet show, Spitting Image (1985–1989, 1996).

He captured wider public attention when appearing on Channel 4's Saturday Live (1986-1988), as several different characters created with Paul Whitehouse. These quickly entered the national consciousness. Among these characters were Stavros, a Greek kebab shop owner with fractured English; and Loadsamoney, an obnoxious plasterer who constantly boasted about how much money he earned. The Loadsamoney character was created in reaction to the policies of the Thatcher government of the day, and took on a life of its own, sampling the songs "Money, Money" from the musical Cabaret and "Money, Money, Money" by ABBA to spawn a hit single in 1988 and a sell-out live tour. In May 1988, Labour Party leader Neil Kinnock used the term loadsamoney to criticise the policies of the Conservative government and journalists began to refer to the "loadsamoney mentality" and the "loadsamoney economy".

As a foil to Loadsamoney, Enfield and Whitehouse created the Geordie "Bugger-All-Money" and in 1988 Enfield appeared as both characters during the Nelson Mandela 70th Birthday Tribute Concert at Wembley Stadium. In time, Whitehouse and Enfield became disturbed that Loadsamoney was being seen in a positive light, rather than as a satirical figure, and they had him run over during a Comic Relief Red Nose Day show while leaving the studio after presenting host Lenny Henry with "the biggest cheque of the night"—a physically huge cheque for ten pence. Enfield created "Tory Boy", a character which portrayed a young male Conservative Member of Parliament (MP).

In 1989, Enfield realised a personal project, Norbert Smith - a Life, a spoof on British theatrical knights "slumming" in the film industry. He starred as Dirk Gently in the BBC Radio adaptations of Dirk Gently's Holistic Detective Agency (1986-1987).

=== TV series ===
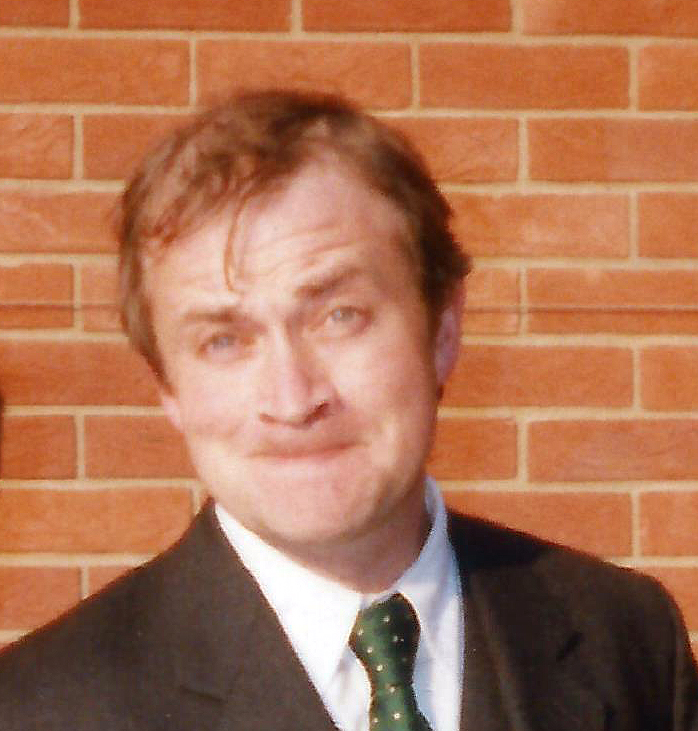
Enfield in 1998

In 1990, Enfield developed his BBC sketch show Harry Enfield's Television Programme, later retitled Harry Enfield & Chums, with Whitehouse and Kathy Burke. Eschewing the alternative comedy style prevalent at the time, both versions of the show were indebted to comedians such as Dick Emery and Morecambe and Wise. Enfield and his co-performers created another group of nationally recognised characters for these shows, such as The Old Gits, Tim Nice-But-Dim, The Scousers, Smashie and Nicey, Wayne and Waynetta Slob, Mr You-Don’t-Wanna-Do-It-Like-That, Annoying Kid Brother, who grew into Kevin the Teenager, and two old-fashioned presenters, Mr Cholmondley-Warner and Grayson.

In 1991, Enfield played Dermot in the Thames Television sitcom Men Behaving Badly (1992), alongside Martin Clunes, Caroline Quentin and Leslie Ash. Enfield left after the first series, and was replaced in the second series by Neil Morrissey as Tony. Enfield is a professed fan of opera and fronted a Channel 4 documentary series on the subject. In 1991 Harry starred as Little Jim Morley in the series Gone to the Dogs (1991).

After a short break from television, Enfield signed a new contract with BSkyB, but produced only one series, Harry Enfield's Brand Spanking New Show. In 2002 Enfield returned to the BBC as the ageing rockstar Gary Bloke in Celeb, which received poor audience ratings. He also played the character Tim Nice-But-Dim from the TV special The Comedy Trail: A Shaggy Dog Story.

In 2002, Enfield was the first guest on the revamped version of BBC's Top Gear where he recorded a 2 minute and 1 second lap. He also appeared on the show on 23 November 2008. Enfield has also narrated various TV documentaries, such as Discovery Wings' Classic British Aircraft.

In 2007, he played Jim Stonem in the Channel 4 series Skins. He reprised this role in the second series in 2008, and the third series in 2009, and directed two episodes in season two entitled "Chris" and "Tony" in 2008. He directed and starred alongside Paul Whitehouse in their own comedy series Harry & Paul (originally titled Ruddy Hell! It's Harry & Paul) in 2007. For their work on this series, they both jointly won the 2009 British Academy Television Award for Best Comedy (Programme or Series).

In September 2013 Enfield appeared as Martin, the father of Jack Whitehall's character Alfie, in the BBC Three comedy series Bad Education. In October 2014, Enfield and Paul Whitehouse returned to the characters of Frank and George in a sketch for Channel 4's testicular cancer awareness comedy show "The Feeling Nuts Comedy Night".

In August 2015, Enfield, alongside Whitehouse, in celebration of their 25-year partnership, presented An Evening With Harry Enfield and Paul Whitehouse.

In 2016, he appeared as John Shakespeare, father of William Shakespeare, in the sitcom Upstart Crow.

Since 2016, Enfield has appeared as Prince Charles (later King Charles III) in the Channel 4 sitcom The Windsors. For his portrayal of Charles, he was nominated for the British Academy Television Award for Best Male Comedy Performance in 2017.

=== Films ===
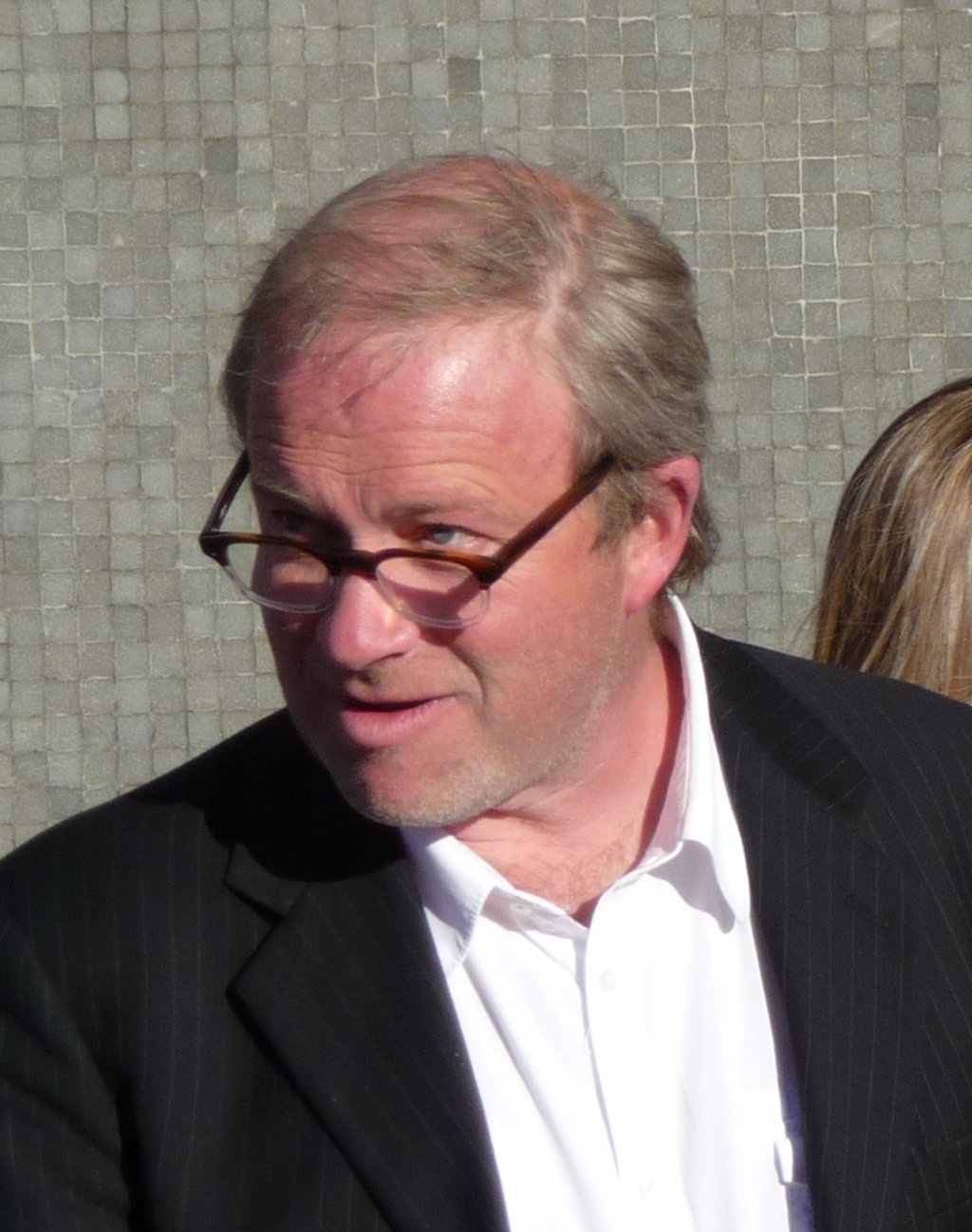
Enfield in 2009

In 2000, Enfield appeared in his first leading film role playing Kevin alongside Kathy Burke, who played the character's (male) friend Perry—roles originally created for Enfield's television series—in Kevin & Perry Go Large (2000). The film charted the pair's attempt to become professional DJs by travelling to the nightclubs of Ibiza and pestering their idol, the DJ Eyeball Paul, played by Rhys Ifans, while gaining love and losing their virginity. Enfield also appeared as King George VI in Churchill: The Hollywood Years (2004), a satire on Hollywood's tendency to change elements of history. In 2012, he starred with Simon Callow in the film Acts of Godfrey.

He reprised his role as Martin in The Bad Education Movie (2015). He appeared as Bill in the 2015 film Scottish Mussel.

In 2015 Enfield and Jessica Hynes appeared as Mr and Mrs Jackson in a BBC film of the Arthur Ransome children's novel Swallows and Amazons.

In 2022, Enfield appeared as Tony Blair in the made-for-television biographical musical comedy film Prince Andrew: The Musical.

=== Video games ===
In 2012, a likeness of his character Loadsamoney, named "Harold Lott", was released as a DLC skin for the game Killing Floor.

=== Commercials ===
Enfield appeared in some television commercials before becoming famous, including one made in 1987 for Tetley. Enfield's commercials include a series made in 1994 for Dime Bar. One commercial in this series had Enfield as a yokel refusing a Dime bar—smooth on the outside, crunchy on the inside—because he preferred armadillos—smooth on the inside, crunchy on the outside. Later Enfield, with Paul Whitehouse, starred in a series of commercials for Hula Hoops as The Self-Righteous Brothers, characters from Enfield's television show. In 2004 Enfield starred in a series of commercials for Burger King in Paraguay as Dr Angus, a character intended to promote the company's newest hamburger. Two more characters from Enfield's TV series, Mr Cholmondley-Warner and Grayson, also appeared in commercials, for Mercury Communications. Also in 2004 Enfield provided the voice of "The Roaming Gnome" character used in Travelocity's U.S. advertising campaign. Enfield was also in commercials for Worthington Bitter.

=== Music ===
Enfield made a cameo appearance as 'the tea lady' during Blur's performance at the Olympics Closing Ceremony Celebration Concert in London's Hyde Park in 2012.

He also appeared alongside Damon Albarn's other project the Good, the Bad & the Queen, as compere, during a live performance at the Tower of London, on 9 July 2007.

In January 2025, Enfield featured in Ego Death, a film of 10 interconnected music videos accompanying an album by Archie Henderson's musical persona, Jazz Emu.

=== Theatre ===
In 2021 Enfield appeared as Prince Charles in The Windsors: Endgame at the Prince of Wales Theatre in London.

In August 2025 Harry Enfield launched his theatrical tour Harry Enfield and *No* Chums. Appearances were made November 2025 in both Australia and New Zealand.

== Discography ==
Title	Year	Peak chart positions	Album
Title	Year	UK	Album
"Loadsamoney (Doin' Up the House)"	1988	4	Non-album single

== Awards and nominations ==
Date	Award	Category	Work	Result	Ref.
1995	Writers' Guild of Great Britain	TV - Light Entertainment (shared)	Harry Enfield and Chums	Won	
1997	Writers' Guild of Great Britain	TV - Light Entertainment (shared)	Harry Enfield and Chums	Won	
1997	National Television Awards	Most Popular Comedy Performer	Harry Enfield and Chums	Nominated	
1998	BAFTA TV Awards	Best Entertainment Performance	Harry Enfield and Chums	Nominated	
2008	Loaded Lafta Awards	Loaded Legend		Won	
2008	Banff Television Festival Awards	Rockie Award - Best Comedy Program (shared)	Ruddy Hell! It's Harry and Paul	Nominated	
2009	BAFTA TV Awards	Best Comedy Programme (shared)	Ruddy Hell! It's Harry and Paul	Won	
2009	British Comedy Award	Best Sketch Show	Ruddy Hell! It's Harry and Paul	Won	
2010	British Comedy Award	Best Sketch Show	Ruddy Hell! It's Harry and Paul	Won	
2011	BAFTA TV Awards	Best Comedy Programme (shared)	Ruddy Hell! It's Harry and Paul	Won	
2015	BAFTA TV Awards	Best Scripted Comedy	Harry & Paul's Story of the 2s	Nominated	
2015	Royal Television Society Programme Awards	Comedy Performance	Harry & Paul's Story of the 2s	Nominated	
2015	Royal Television Society Programme Awards	Writer - Comedy (shared)	Harry & Paul's Story of the 2s	Won	
2017	BAFTA TV Awards	Best Male Comedy Performance	The Windsors	Nominated	

== Personal life ==
In the late 1980s and early 1990s, Enfield was in a relationship with film producer Alison Owen, mother of Lily and Alfie Allen. In 1997, Enfield married Lucy Lyster; they have three children. In August 2020 the couple separated.
