= Rupert Vansittart =

English actor

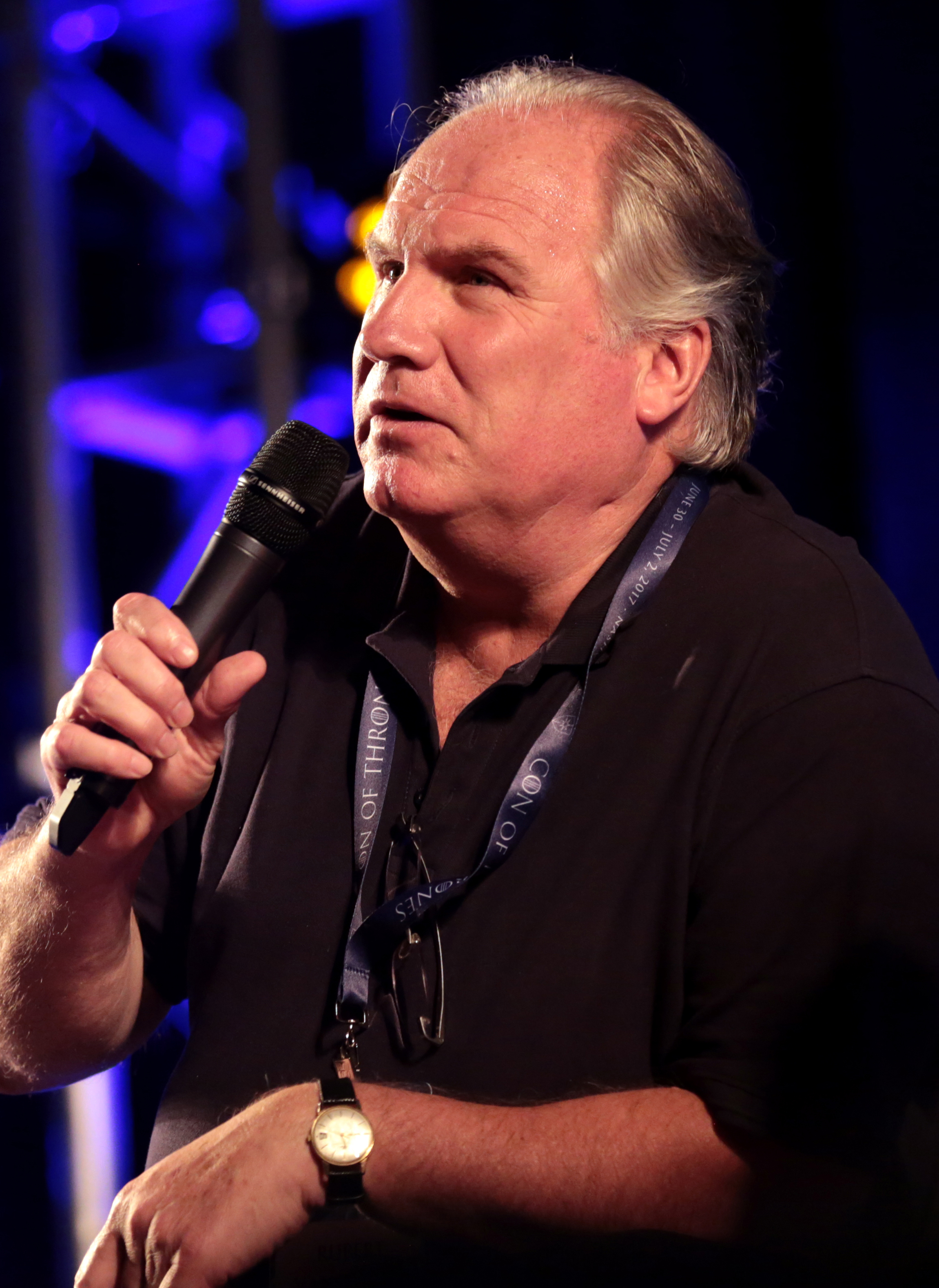
- Vansittart in July 2017
- Born: Rupert Nicholas Vansittart; 10 February 1958 (age 68); Cranleigh, England
- Education: Central School of Speech and Drama
- Occupation: Actor
- Years active: 1985–present
- Spouse: Emma Kate Watson (m. 1987)
- Children: 2

Rupert Nicholas Vansittart (born 10 February 1958) is an English actor. He has appeared in a variety of roles in film, television, stage and radio, often playing comic characters. He is best known for his role as Lord Ashfordly in the ITV drama Heartbeat (1992–2009) and for playing Lord Yohn Royce in the HBO series Game of Thrones (2014–2019).

== Early life and education ==
Vansittart was raised in Cranleigh, Surrey, and is of partial Dutch ancestry. His last name translates as "from Sittard", the latter being the current spelling of Sittart, a city in Limburg, the southernmost province of the Netherlands. He trained at the Central School of Speech and Drama.

== Career ==
Vansittart started his acting career in an episode of Bulman in 1985. In 1992, he began playing his regular role as North Yorkshire aristocrat Lord Ashfordly in the police drama series Heartbeat, which he continued to play until 2009. He appeared in Remains of the Day (1993) as Sir Geoffrey Wren, a character based on the 1930s British fascist Oswald Mosley. He appeared in Four Weddings and a Funeral (1994) as George the Boor at the Boatman. He appeared in Braveheart (1995) as Lord Bottoms. He was also cast in the serial Pride and Prejudice (1995) as Mr Hurst, the brother-in-law of Charles and Caroline Bingley.

Vansittart appeared as a guest star in two episodes of Mr. Bean, as well as appearing in The Thin Blue Line and Johnny English Reborn (2011).

In 2002, Vansittart appeared in the Midsomer Murders episode "Market for Murder". He also portrayed General Asquith in the Doctor Who episodes "Aliens of London" and "World War Three". In 2003, he appeared in the West End adaptation of Arsenic and Old Lace. In 2006, Vansittart portrayed Thomas J. Dodd in the BBC three-part drama documentary Nuremberg: Nazis on Trial. In 2007, he appeared in another episode of Midsomer Murders, "The Axeman Cometh". He also appeared in the 2008 BBC serial Spartacus as Consul Lentulus.

In 2009, Vansittart was cast as Conservative MP Peter Morrison in Margaret, a television film about Margaret Thatcher's life, career, and downfall. Two years later, in The Iron Lady with Meryl Streep, he played Cabinet minister John Biffen. He has also played political characters on stage: in 2014 he was one of the main actors in the cast of Great Britain at the Royal National Theatre.

2009 also saw Vansittart's third appearance in Midsomer Murders, in the episode "The Dogleg Murders". In 2010, he appeared in Doctors as Anthony Chippington, a friend of Charlie's. He played Harrison Ashton Lard, the "posh girl's father", in How Not to Live Your Life. He provided additional voice-over for World's Craziest Fools. He appeared in the final two seasons of Foyle's War as Sir Alec Myerson, the title character's boss at MI5. Vansittart also appeared in the BBC Three comedy Bad Education, playing Mr. Humpage. In 2014, Vansittart started playing Lord Yohn Royce in the HBO series Game of Thrones, making recurring appearances in season 4, 5, 6, 7 and 8. In 2016, he appears in the BBC TV series Father Brown as Arthur Le Broc in episode 4.7 "The Missing Man". In January 2016, he played Peter Jennings in an episode of the BBC series Casualty.

== Personal life ==
Vansittart has been married to Emma Kate, daughter of the actors Moray Watson and Pamela Marmont, since 1987. They have two children. When Emma Watson was cast for Harry Potter and the Philosopher's Stone, Emma Kate Watson changed her name to Emma Vansittart, adopting her husband's surname as her new stage name, to avoid being confused with the young actress.

== Filmography ==
=== Film ===
Year	Title	Role	Notes
1985	Plenty	Client's Asst.	
1986	Half Moon Street	Alan Platts-Williams	
1987	Eat the Rich	Rupert	
1988	Buster	Fairclough	
1993	The Remains of the Day	Sir Geoffrey Wren	
1994	Four Weddings and a Funeral	George the Boor at The Boatman – Wedding One	
1995	Braveheart	Lord Bottoms	
1995	Cutthroat Island	Captain Perkins	
1997	Diana & Me	Chef	
1998	Monk Dawson	Fr Timothy	
2000	Kevin & Perry Go Large	Bank Manager	
2008	The Bank Job	Sir Leonard Plugge	
2011	Johnny English Reborn	Derek	
2011	The Iron Lady	Cabinet Minister	
2013	Austenland	Mr. Wattlesbrook	
2016	A United Kingdom	Sir Ian Fraser	
2017	The Children Act	Sherwood Runcie	
2020	Misbehaviour	Lord Bly	

=== Television ===
Year	Title	Role	Notes
1985	Bulman	Jack	1 episode
1986	The Comic Strip Presents...	Jeremy	1 episode
1988; 1989	Wish Me Luck	Guard in Factory / German Soldier at Station	2 episodes
1989	The Saint: The Brazilian Connection	Wyatt	Television film
1990; 1991	The Piglet Files	Zemskov / KGB Officer	2 episodes
1992–2009	Heartbeat	Lord Ashfordly	Main role, 75 episodes
1993	Love Hurts	Richard Hollis	1 episode
1993	Chef!	Diner	1 episode
1993	Frank Stubbs Promotes	Businessman	1 episode
1994; 1995	Mr. Bean	Police Officer / Guardsman	2 episodes
1995	Pride and Prejudice	Mr Hurst	Miniseries, 4 episodes
1995	The Thin Blue Line	Commander Crow	1 episode
1996	Wilderness	Jeremy	Miniseries, 2 episodes
1997	Supply & Demand	Police Personnel	Television film
1997	Noah's Ark	Mark Villiers	1 episode
1997	A Dance to the Music of Time	Soper	Miniseries, 1 episode
1997	Painted Lady	Henry Fellows	Television film
1998	Berkeley Square	Lord Percy Wilton	Miniseries, 2 episodes
1998	Frenchman's Creek	Lord Godolphin	TV Movie
1998	Vanity Fair	Smith	Miniseries, 1 episode
1998; 2014	Birds of a Feather	Counsel / Wayne	2 episodes
1999	CI5: The New Professionals	Chairman	1 episode
2000	The Bill	Solicitor	1 episode
2000	Harry Enfield's Brand Spanking New Show	Various	2 episodes
2000	Black Books	Rich Guy	1 episode
2000	Take a Girl Like You	Headmaster	2 episodes
2000; 2001	My Family	Mr. Davis / Mr. Quince	2 episodes
2001	Sword of Honour	Commander-in-Chief	Television film
2001	Sam's Game	Robert	1 episode
2001	Randall and Hopkirk (Deceased)	Brian Babbacombe	1 episode
2001	The Way We Live Now	Sir Damask Monogram	Miniseries, 1 episode
2002	The Falklands Play	Sir Robert Armstrong	Television film
2002; 2007; 2009	Midsomer Murders	Alistair Kingslake / Desmond Harcourt / Selwyn Proctor	3 episodes
2003–2004	My Dad's the Prime Minister	Chancellor	Recurring role, 8 episodes
2004	The Brief	Prettyman	Miniseries, 1 episode
2004	Roman Road	Farmer	Television film
2005	Twisted Tales	Dr. Mantle	1 episode
2005	Doctor Who	General Asquith	Episodes: "Aliens of London"/"World War Three"
2005	Wallis & Edward	Chief Whip	Television film
2006	Nuremberg: Nazis on Trial	Thomas J. Dodd	Miniseries, 2 episodes
2007	Hustle	Jonathan Mortimer-Howe	1 episode
2007	Sensitive Skin	Interview Guest	1 episode, uncredited
2008	Heroes and Villains	Lentulus	1 episode
2009	Margaret	Peter Morrison	Television film
2010	How Not to Live Your Life	Harrison	1 episode
2010	Any Human Heart	The Earl	Miniseries, 2 episodes
2010; 2012; 2014	Doctors	Benedict 'Bennie' Harley / Mr. Graham Fitch / Anthony Chippington	3 episodes
2011	Comedy Showcase	Headmaster	1 episode
2011	Holy Flying Circus	Bernard Barnard QC	Television film
2012	The Royal Bodyguard	Roderick Finch	Miniseries, 1 episode
2012	Bad Education	Mr. Humpage	1 episode
2013–2015	Foyle's War	Sir Alec Meyerson	Recurring role, 5 episodes
2014	The Midnight Beast	Headmaster	1 episode
2014	Death in Paradise	Colin Campbell	1 episode
2014–2019	Game of Thrones	Yohn Royce	Recurring role, 13 episodes
2015	Chewing Gum	Big Boss	1 episode
2015	Versailles	Throckmorton	2 episodes
2016	Father Brown	Arthur Le Broc	1 episode
2016; 2021	Casualty	Peter Jennings/Kenneth Stair	2 episodes
2016	Plebs	Tarquin	1 episode
2016	Tutankhamun	Flinders Petrie	Miniseries, 1 episode
2017	King Charles III	Sir Matthew	Television film
2017	Outlander	Lord William Dunsany	1 episode
2017–2022	Doc Martin	Professor Langan	2 episodes
2019–2022	Gentleman Jack	Charles Lawton	Recurring role, 6 episodes
2019	Four Weddings and a Funeral	George	Miniseries, 2 episodes
2019	The Crown	Cecil Harmsworth King	1 episode
2020	Spy City	Ian Stuart-Hay	Miniseries, 4 episodes
2021–2023	The Nevers	Lord Broughton	Recurring role, 5 episodes
2022	Bridgerton	Mr. Brookes	1 episode
2022	Andor	Chief Hyne	2 episodes
2022	The Larkins	Dean	1 episode
2023–present	The Diplomat	Hoope	3 episodes
2023	The Chelsea Detective	Patrick Blythe	1 episode
2023	Sister Boniface Mysteries	Sir Swinton Usher	1 episode
2024	Belgravia: The Next Chapter	Lord Netherbury	Miniseries, 4 episodes
2025	Amadeus	Rosenberg	Miniseries
2026	Ann Droid	Jeffery	4 episodes

=== Video games ===
Year	Title	Voice role	Notes
2019	Dance of Death: Du Lac & Fey	John Waldron	

=== Audio ===
Year	Title	Role	Notes
2008	Doctor Who: The Eighth Doctor Adventures	Sepulchre / Judge Jeffreys / Bellman / Kletch / Blackout Killer / Archdruid	1 episode

== Theatre ==
- The Revengers' Comedies (1989)
- Taking Steps (1990)
- The Revengers' Comedies (1991)
- A Westwood Diary (1996)
- Arsenic and Old Lace (2003)
- This House (2013)
- Great Britain (2014)
