= Dorset House School =

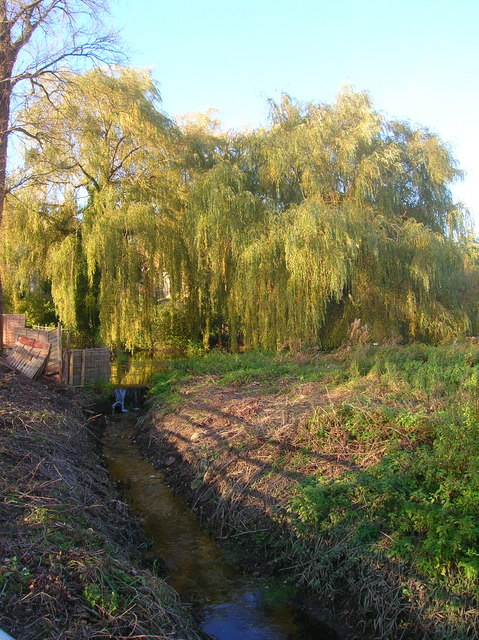
- View in the school grounds

Location
- The Manor; Bury, West Sussex, RH20 1PB; England; 50.9086°N 0.5552°W

Information
- Type: Other Independent School
- Religious affiliation: Church of England
- Established: 1784; 242 years ago
- Local authority: West Sussex County Council
- Department for Education URN: 126109 Tables
- Head teacher: Matt Thomas
- Gender: Coeducational
- Age: 4 to 13
- Enrolment: 146
- Colours: Blue and Gold
- Website: dorsethouseschool.com

Dorset House School is a co-educational preparatory school near Pulborough in West Sussex, England.

== History ==
The school was founded in 1784 as Totteridge Park School in Hertfordshire. In 1865 it moved to Hendon and became Brent Bridge House school, and from 1874 to 1886, it move to Elstree and became Hillside School. In 1886 it moved to Littlehampton and became The School House. In 1900, it merged with and became Dorset House School. In 1963/64 it moves to Bury.

== Notable alumni ==
- Jeremy Bulloch (1945-2020), actor known for portraying Boba Fett in the Star Wars franchise
