= Kevin the Teenager =

Character created in 1990 by Harry Enfield

- Harry Enfield and Chums character
- First appearance: Harry Enfield's Television Programme; 1990
- Last appearance: Kevin & Perry Go Large; 2000
- Portrayed by: Harry Enfield

In-universe information
- Full name: Kevin Quentin Julius Patterson
- Relatives: Frank Patterson (father); Nancy Patterson (mother); Unnamed paternal grandmother; Richard Patterson (paternal grandfather) (deceased)
- Nationality: British

Kevin Quentin Julius Patterson is a character created and played by the British comedian Harry Enfield. In a 2001 Channel 4 poll, Kevin was ranked 15th on their list of the 100 Greatest TV characters.

== Evolution ==
Kevin originated in 1990 in the "Little Brother" sketches of Harry Enfield's Television Programme as an annoyingly energetic young boy who constantly vexed his older brother (played by Lee Whitlock) with his irritating catchphrases and habit of bursting into his room when he was with a girl, to bother their activities.

In the first episode of Harry Enfield and Chums (the follow-up series, in November 1994), Kevin is excited at being nearly thirteen. The sketch showed his parents watching in horror as Kevin lost his sense of dress, courtesy, rational thought and posture as the clock struck midnight on the day of his thirteenth birthday, thus becoming Kevin the Teenager, one of the most memorable of Enfield's comic creations. Unlike the previous sketches which included an older brother, this incarnation of Kevin is implied to be an only child.

== Personality ==
As a teenager, wearing a baseball cap backward and with his red hair flopping over his face, Kevin is rude to his despairing parents, frequently shouting "I hate you, I wish I'd never been born!" at them, and insisting that everything is "so unfair!" In one sketch, when his father asks him to wash his car, Kevin ends up taking the entire day to complete the task due to his inability to get out of bed before noon and an apparent allergy to work, and in another sketch, though wide awake, he made the most primitive of attempts at tidying his room when required to do so. The character is also heavily dictated by peer pressure, and was seen in various other sketches trying to sound like Ali G, or Liam Gallagher.

His best friend is another teenage boy named Perry Carter (played by the actress Kathy Burke, and based on "Perry The Pre-pubescent Schoolboy" who Burke portrayed on Channel 4 chat show, The Last Resort). They starred in a 2000 feature film, Kevin & Perry Go Large.

The sketches suggest that teenage boys are always very polite to all parents except their own. Kevin and Perry heap immense amounts of abuse on their own respective parents (though Perry shouts at his down the phone rather than face-to-face) yet are very polite to each other's parents. In one sketch, Kevin's plans to host a party go wrong and ends with the house being trashed. Despite his frequent declarations of hatred towards his parents, Kevin ends up crying whilst his long-suffering mother gives him a much-needed hug.

Aside from playing video games, Kevin's one aim in life is to lose his virginity, or at least to prove that he has a girlfriend. From boasting about the (imagined) joys of sex to placing the nozzle of a vacuum cleaner to his neck to look as though he has received a love bite, he is determined to prove that he has "done it". He eventually does lose his virginity during a drunken party in the final episode of Harry Enfield and Chums. The following morning, he wakes up transformed into a nice, polite and helpful young man. This is however later revealed to be a dream by his mother in the first of the two Christmas specials, with Kevin still behaving as before. Kevin and Perry both eventually lose their virginity in Ibiza in Kevin & Perry Go Large.

== Reception ==
Early in his career Andy Murray was sometimes called Kevin the Teenager due to his bad-tempered on-court demeanour and occasionally surly attitude in interviews.

== Kevin's parents ==
In both series of Harry Enfield's Television Programme, when Kevin was "Little Brother", his mother was played by Caroline Quentin and his father was played by Martyn Whitby.

As a teenager, Kevin's mother (named Sheila in one of the earlier sketches) was played by Louisa Rix in both series of Harry Enfield and Chums and in Kevin & Perry Go Large.

Kevin's father, named Dave in one of the earlier sketches, and later Frank as well as Ray in the film, has been played by three actors:

- Duncan Preston in Harry Enfield and Chums first series, 1994
- Stephen Moore in Harry Enfield and Chums - Moore replaced Preston in the second series, 1997.
- James Fleet in Kevin & Perry Go Large. Fleet had previously played one of Kevin's teachers in a sketch from series 2 of Harry Enfield and Chums set at a parents evening.
