= Tory Boy =

British TV show character

Tory Boy was a character in a television sketch by comedian Harry Enfield, portraying a young, male supporter of the Conservative Party. Since then, the term has been used as a caricature of young Conservatives. Tory Boy was depicted as a repulsive thirteen-year-old with glaringly outdated beliefs about society and the world in general. Enfield based the character on a snobbish, unpopular boy he knew in school, and a younger version of William Hague, who was a prominent member of the Young Conservatives group from his teenage years and famously delivered a speech at the Conservative Party's annual national conference at age 16. Enfield also drew inspiration from other contemporary Conservative politicians, such as Michael Howard and Michael Portillo whom he described as "Tory Boys who have never grown up." The traits of "Tory Boy" have also been said to mirror those of a stereotypical member of the Federation of Conservative Students.

The Tory Boy image of a young Conservative MP has been damaging for some politicians. William Hague, for instance, struggled to shake off the stereotype and was often ridiculed for it both before and during his leadership of the party. In 2006, The Daily Telegraph, a Conservative-supporting newspaper, noted that Conservative Future "had managed to change the image of young Conservatives" from that associated with the FCS.

In Enfield's 1997 TV Christmas Special, aired months after Labour's landslide victory in the UK general election, a sketch featured Tory Boy's left-wing father wishing that his son would join the Labour Party. The fairy at the top of their Christmas tree grants his wish, transforming Tory Boy into "Tony Boy" (a parody of Tony Blair).
