= Loadsamoney (Doin' Up the House) =

Single by Harry Enfield
- B-side: "The B Side"
- Released: 25 April 1988
- Recorded: 1987
- Studio: Guerrilla Studios (London, England)
- Genre: Comedy; novelty; hip house; alternative dance
- Length: 3:49
- Label: Mercury
- Songwriters: Harry Enfield; Charles Higson; William Wainwright; Paul Whitehouse
- Producers: The Guerrilla Boyz; Krunch Groove

Music video
- "Loadsamoney (Doin' Up the House)" on YouTube

"Loadsamoney (Doin' Up the House)" is a novelty song by the English comedian Harry Enfield. It was released as a single on 25 April 1988 by Mercury Records, peaking at No. 4 on the UK singles chart, with Enfield performing in character as 'Loadsamoney', an oafish, arrogant plasterer who habitually boasts of his earning capacity. The song contains a brief sample of ABBA's 1976 song "Money, Money, Money", as well as the song "Money, Money" from the film Cabaret (1972), performed by Liza Minnelli and Joel Grey, and a short sample of the Flying Lizards' 1979 recording "Money (That's What I Want)". There are also two brief references to the song "Big Spender".

The song was written by Enfield, comedians Charlie Higson and Paul Whitehouse, and electronic musician and record producer William Orbit.

== Background ==
The Loadsamoney character was created in reaction to the policies of the Thatcher government of the day. The song also spawned a sold-out live tour. In May 1988, Labour Party leader Neil Kinnock used the term loadsamoney to criticise the policies of the Conservative government and journalists began to refer to the "loadsamoney mentality" and the "loadsamoney economy".

== Track listing ==
=== 7" vinyl ===
- Mercury — DOSH 1

Side A
| No. | Title | Length |
|---|---|---|
| 1. | "Loadsamoney (Doin' Up the House)" | 3:49 |

Side B
| No. | Title | Length |
|---|---|---|
| 1. | "The B-Side" | 3:57 |

=== 12" vinyl ===
- Mercury — DOSH 112

Side A
| No. | Title | Length |
|---|---|---|
| 1. | "Loadsamoney (Doin' Up the House)" (The Turbo Nutter mix) | 6:58 |

Side B
| No. | Title | Length |
|---|---|---|
| 1. | "Loadsamoney (Doin' Up the House)" | 3:49 |
| 2. | "The B-Side" | 3:57 |

== Charts ==
| Chart (1988) | Peak position |
|---|---|
| UK Singles (OCC) | 4 |

== Release history ==
| Region | Date | Label | Format | Catalogue no. |
|---|---|---|---|---|
| United Kingdom | 11 January 1988 | Mercury | 12" | DOSH 112 |
| United Kingdom | 25 April 1988 | Mercury | 7" | DOSH 1 |
