= Spudulike =

British restaurant chain

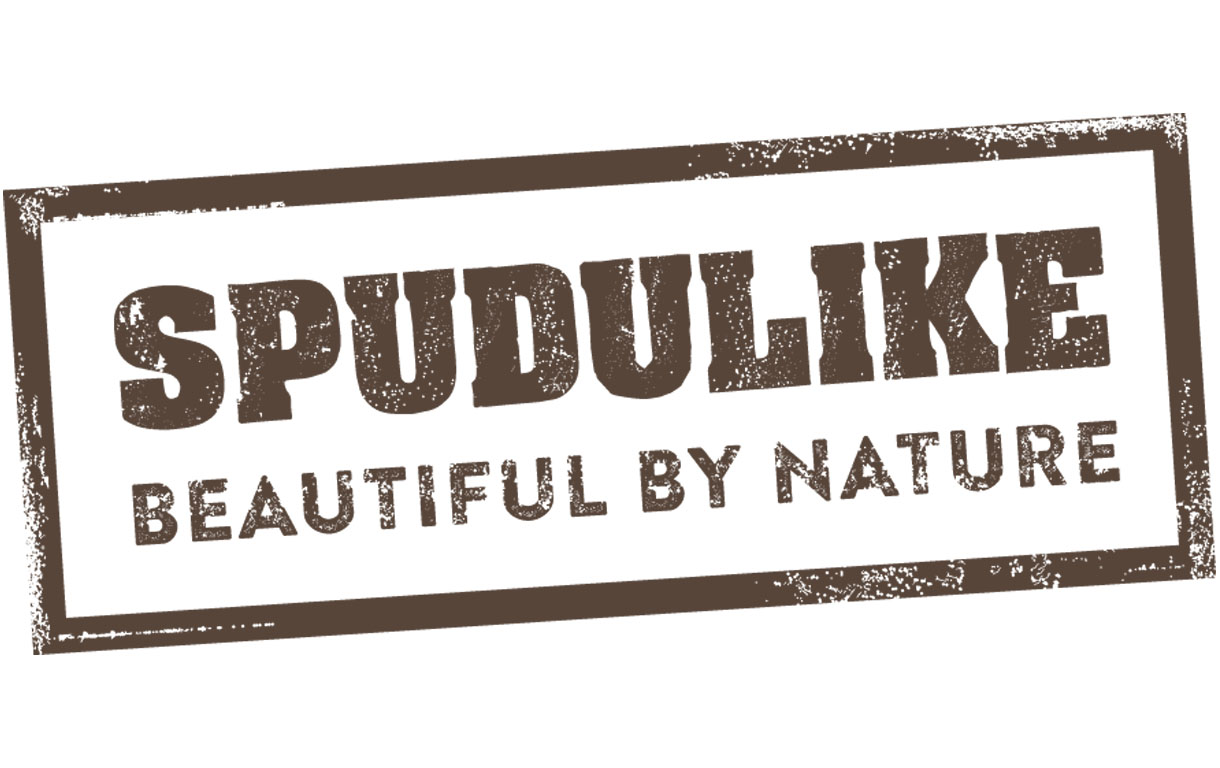
- Company type: Private
- Industry: Casual dining
- Founded: June 1974; 52 years ago in Edinburgh, United Kingdom
- Headquarters: London, England
- Products: Baked potatoes, crushed potato salads, side dishes and desserts

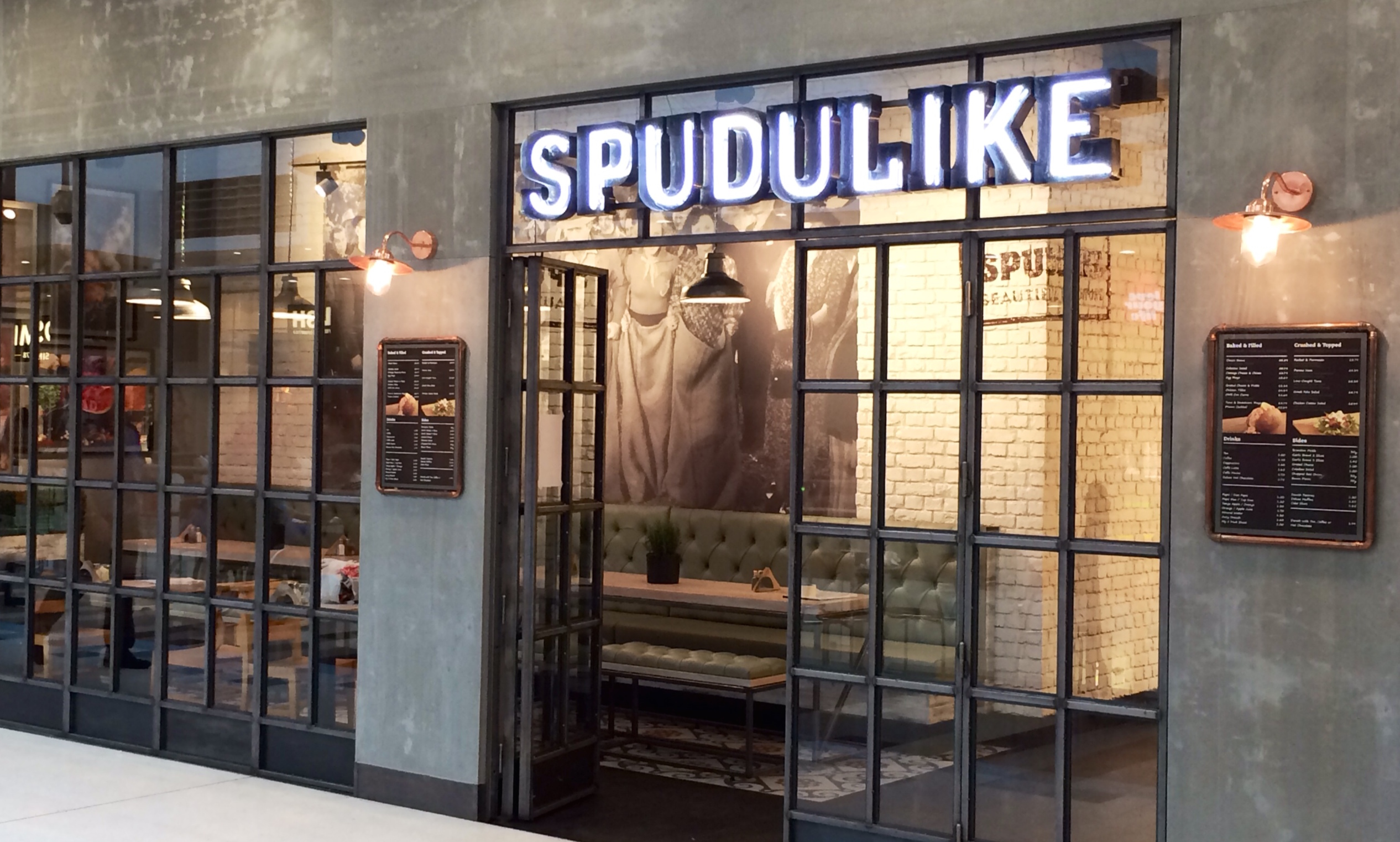
Spudulike Braehead, in 2015

Spudulike Ltd was a British restaurant chain and franchise specialising in baked potatoes (potatoes being known as "spuds" in colloquial British English) that traded from 1974 to 2024. Spudulike sold baked potatoes with various fillings, other potato-based meals, and side dishes.

Spudulike Ltd was founded in 1974 in Edinburgh. The company was acquired by the British School of Motoring (BSM) in 1979, which helped Spudulike to rapidly expand its business as a franchise operation. It later demerged from BSM, and in May 2001, it bought Courts Quality Foods, owner of rival potato brand Fat Jackets. Spudulike had fifty outlets across the United Kingdom in 2001, including twenty Courts franchises.

The company entered into a company voluntary arrangement in July 2019, in an attempt to restructure its debt, then on 1 August filed for administration, with all 37 remaining outlets closed. Potato firm Albert Bartlett acquired a number of Spudulike outlets in September 2019, and reopened them in October 2019 with an updated menu. In October 2021, TV chef James Martin worked with Albert Bartlett to launch an updated Spudulike menu. The 'Spudulike by James Martin' stores were closed in 2024 as the company found they could not make them viable.
