= Cala Benirrás =

Beach on Ibiza, Spain

- Beach
- Location of Cala Benirrás on Ibiza
- Coordinates: 39°5′23″N 1°27′14″E
- Location: Sant Joan de Labritja, Ibiza, Spain

Cala Benirrás is a beach in the northern seaboard of the Spanish island of Ibiza. It is in the municipality of Sant Joan de Labritja and is 4.6 miles (7.4 km) east of the village of Sant Joan de Labritja and 4.6 miles (7.4 km) north north east of the village of Sant Miquel de Balansat.

== Description ==
This beach of this cove, called Port de Benirrás by the local fishermen, is about 300 metres long and is set against a backdrop of densely pine forested cliffs. The beach is a mixture of pebbles and sand with rocks at either end of the beach. The bay's crystal clear sea makes the cove a popular spot for snorkelling but caution is required due to the amount of marine traffic in the bay. The rocks to the side have several dry-dock fisherman's shacks. The sheltered bay is an anchoring spot for private yachts and motor boats. There are many paths for walkers leading from the beach through the surrounding woodlands. Offshore in the middle of the bay lies a rock called Cap Bernat. The rock is said to resemble, variously, a woman at prayer, a giant baby, or the Sphinx.

== Day of The Drums ==
Ibiza was a destinations for hippies in the 1960s. In that time, it became the scene of sporadic full moon-parties. This declined in the 1980s, but became popular again in the 1990s.

On Sunday August 18, 1991 a gathering of anti-war activists, Hippies and other sympathisers, took place on the beach at Benirrás. This event is now known as The Day of the Drums. The gathering was in protest at the first Gulf War in Iraq. The protest later evolved into an annual event, much to the concerns of the authorities and emergency services. Bylaws restricted the event until it was banned it altogether in 2002.

== Gallery ==
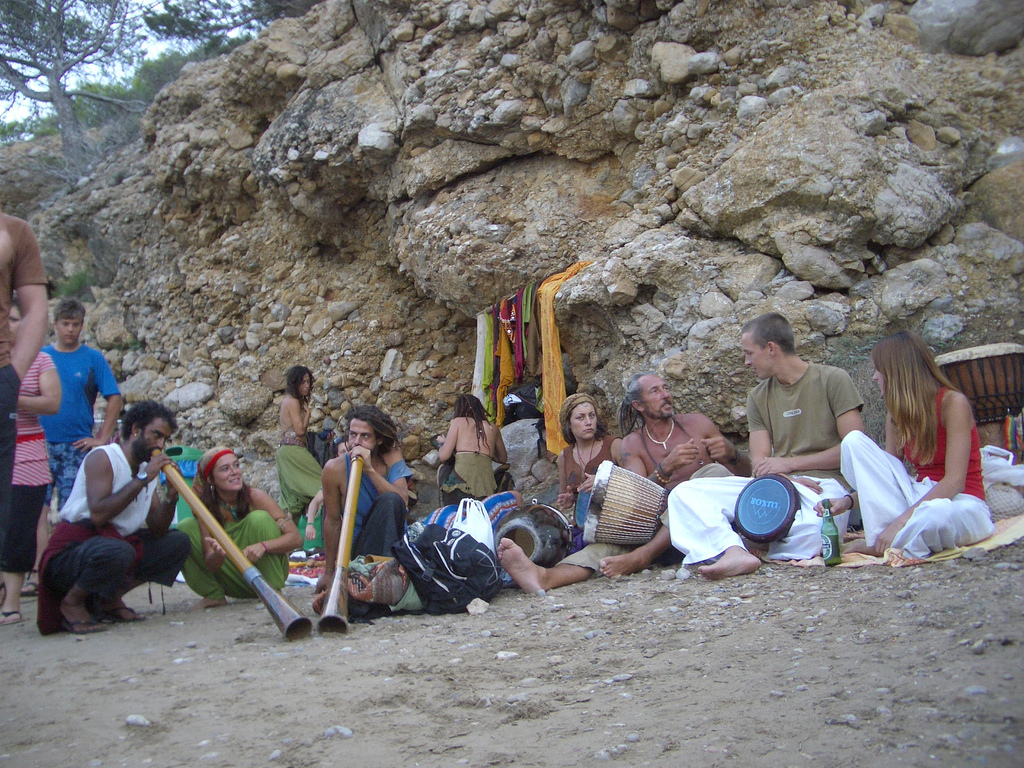
Musicians on the beach

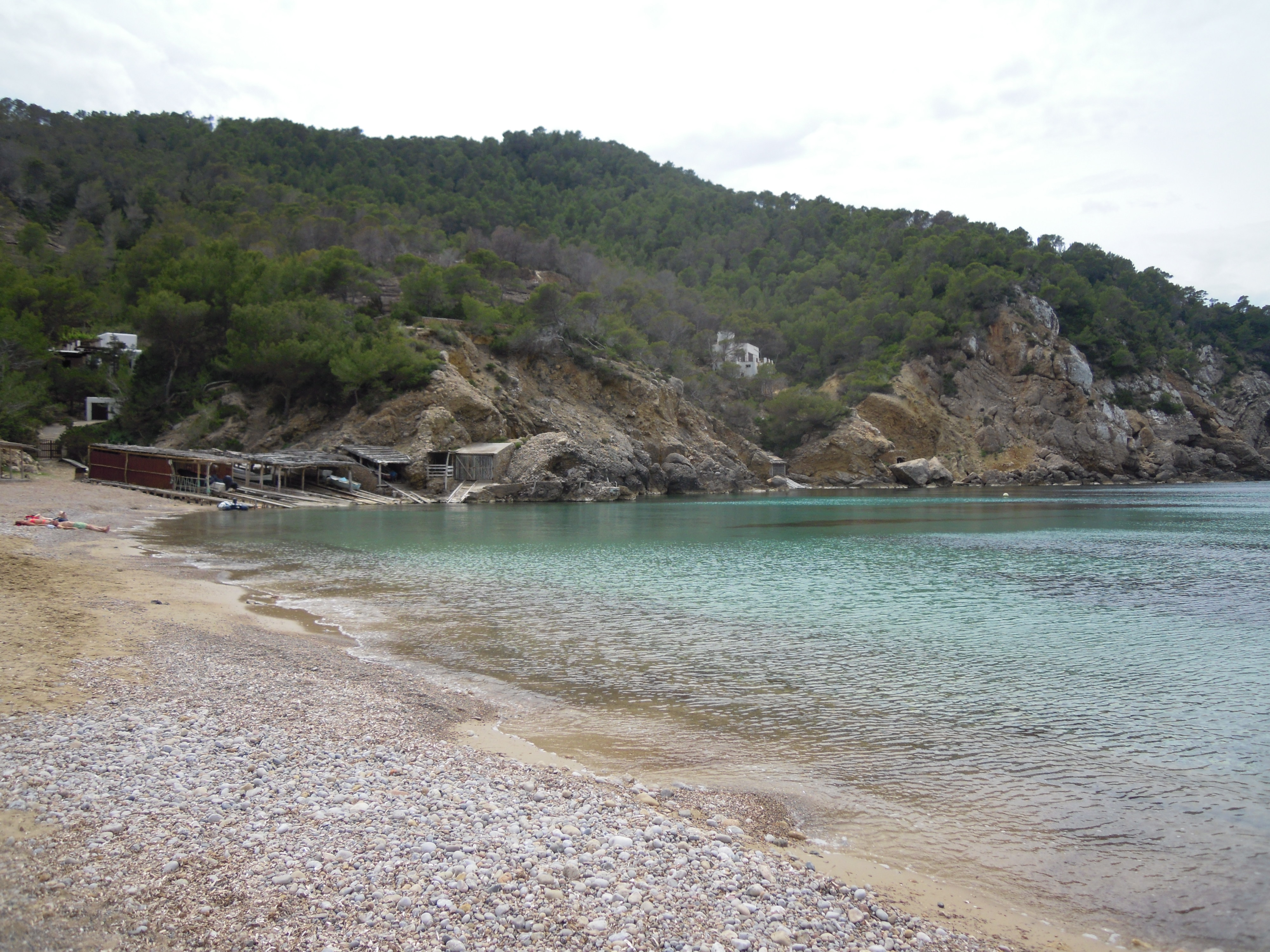
Southern side of the bay

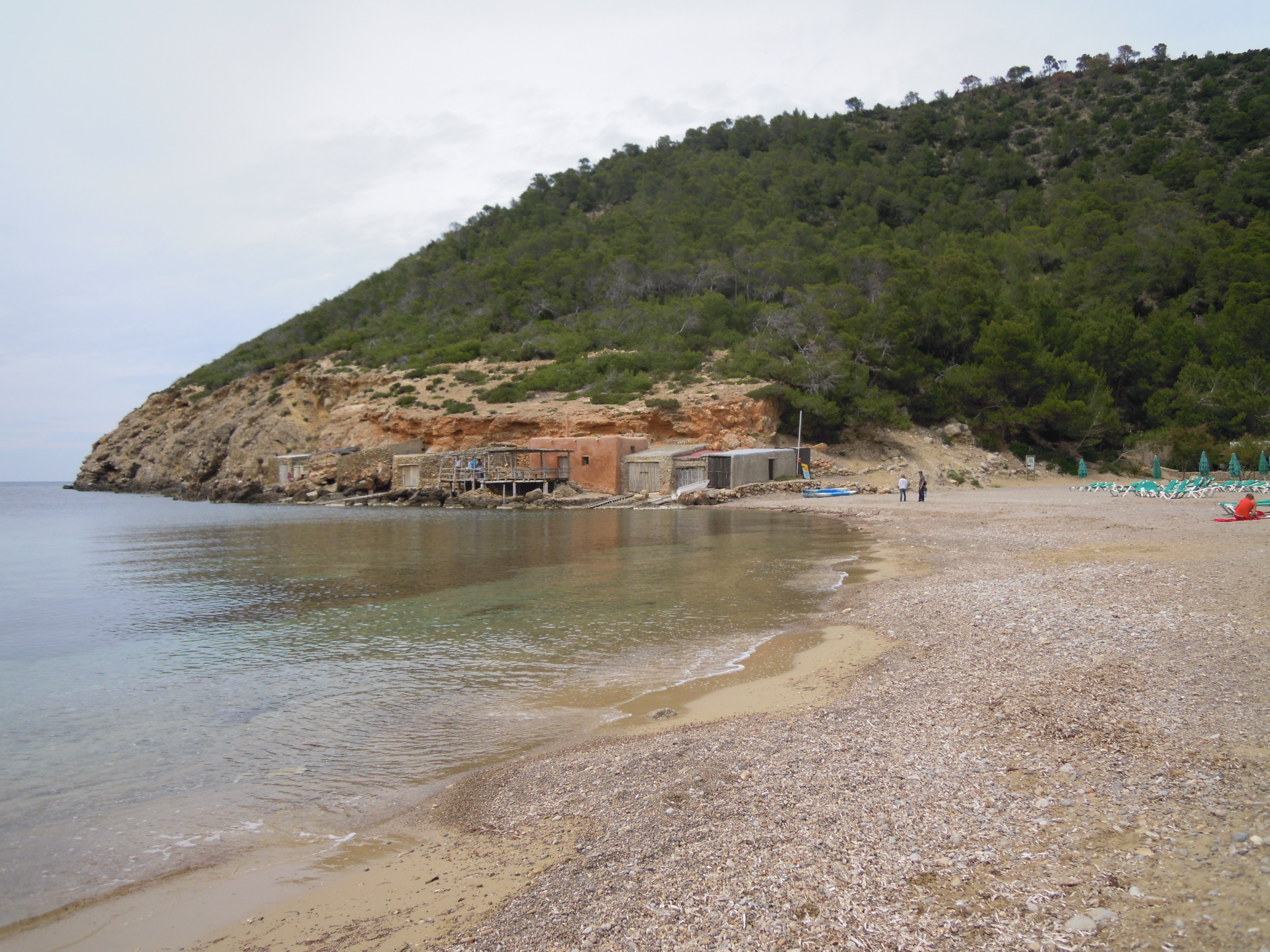
Northern side of the bay

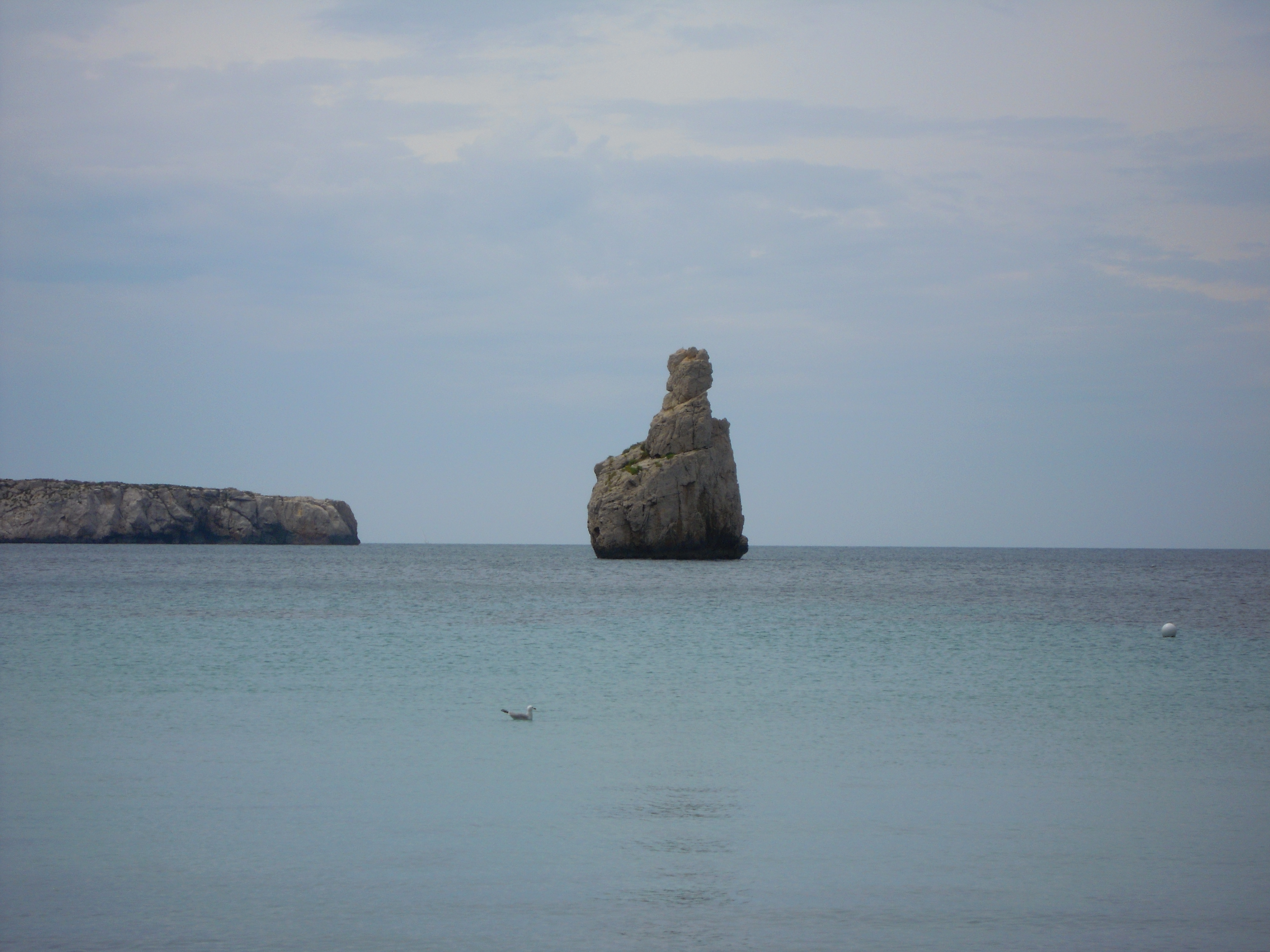
