= Virgin Sun Airlines =

Charter airline of the United Kingdom (1999–2001)

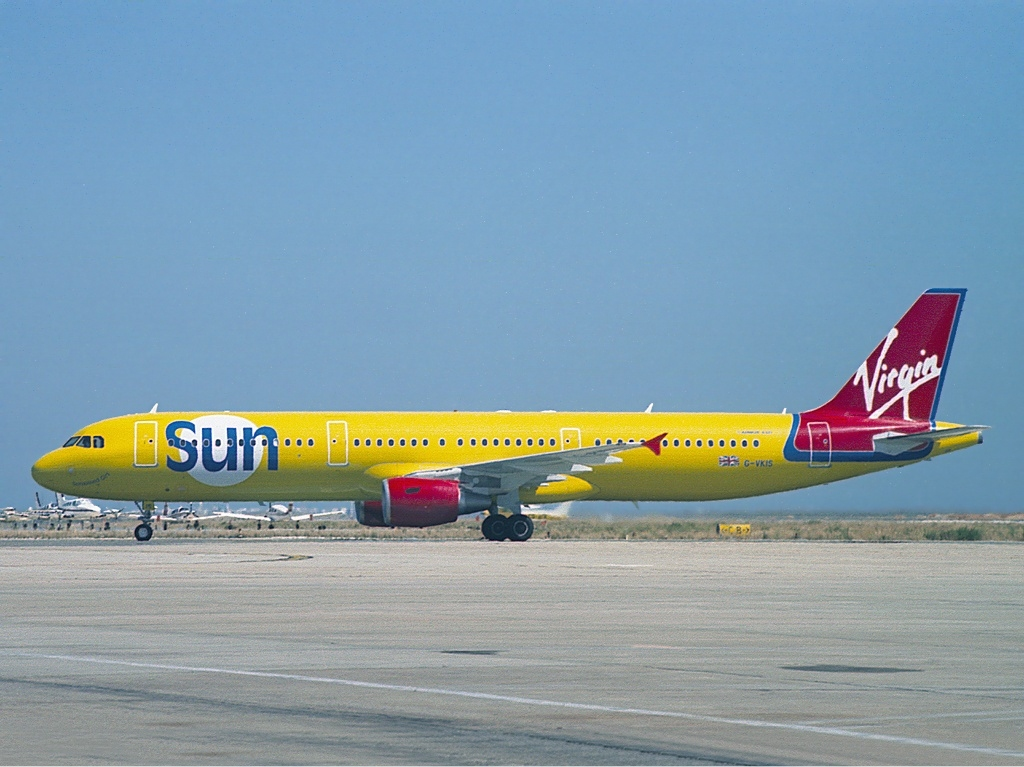
- Virgin Sun Airbus A321-200
IATA	ICAO	Call sign
VS	VIR	VIRGIN
- Founded: 1998
- Commenced operations: 1 May 1999
- Ceased operations: 31 October 2001
- Hubs: London–Gatwick; Manchester
- Fleet size: 4
- Destinations: 17
- Headquarters: The Galleria, Crawley, West Sussex, England
- Key people: Richard Branson (chairman of the Virgin Group)

Virgin Sun Airlines Ltd., branded as Virgin Sun, was a British charter airline owned by the Virgin Group, formed in 1998. The airline's main destinations were the Mediterranean basin destinations and the Canary Islands. The air carrier main bases were Manchester Airport and London Gatwick Airport. All operations were halted in October 2001 and then sold to First Choice Holidays in the following month of November.

== History ==
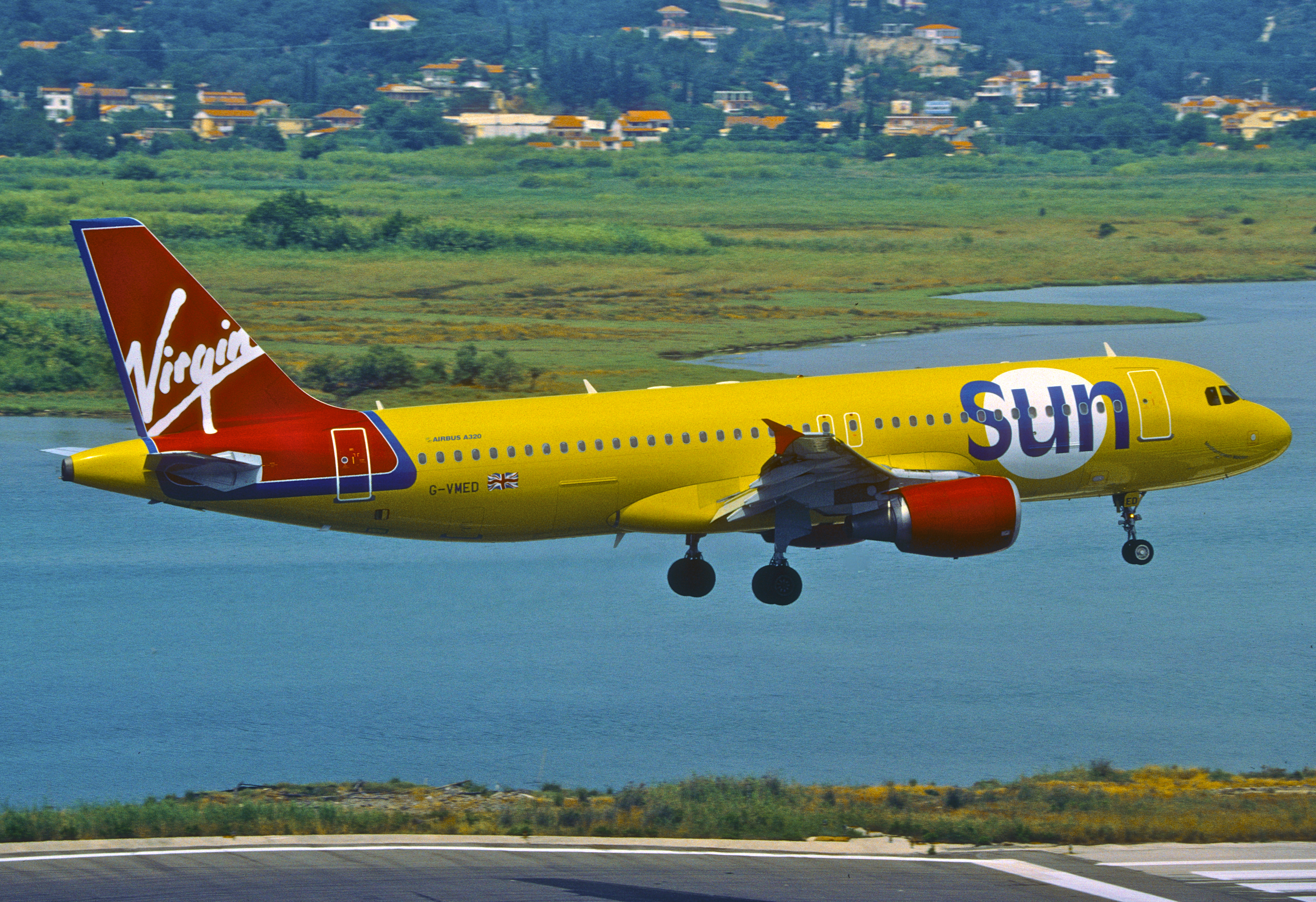
Virgin Sun Airbus A320-200 landing at Corfu International Airport.

Virgin Sun was activated in May 1999, operating from Gatwick Airport and Manchester Airport Terminal 2, with two leased Airbus A320-200 jetliners. After a successful launch and first summer season, the air carrier then received a third A320-200 and its first and only Airbus A321-200 the following year.

In April 2001, two years after the airline commenced operations, Virgin Holidays decided to stop the operations of the subsidiary, due to failing to make the expected profits. Virgin Sun ceased operations on 1 November 2001. After a buyer was sought for the airline, it was eventually sold to First Choice Holidays (owners of Air 2000).
