= The Hitchhiker's Guide to the Galaxy cast lists =

== Main cast ==
Cast lists for different versions of The Hitchhiker's Guide to the Galaxy. A blank cell in the table indicates that the information is unknown. "N/A" indicates that the role in question does not exist for that version of the story. Columns are in chronological order from 1978–2005, except for the two German radio series (1981 and 1990–1991).
Character's Name	Primary and Secondary Phases	Stage Adaptation	LP Adaptations	TV series	Illustrated Edition (hardcover book)	Tertiary to Quintessential Phases	Movie	German Radio Series One	German Radio Series Two	Hexagonal Phase
The Book (Narrator)	Peter Jones	Cindy Oswin (Lithos) and Maya Sendall (Terros)♥ Roger Blake: ♠	Peter Jones	Peter Jones	N/A	William Franklyn	Stephen Fry	Rolf Boysen	Rolf Boysen	John Lloyd
Arthur Dent	Simon Jones	Chris Langham♥	Simon Jones	Simon Jones	Jonathan Lermit	Simon Jones	Martin Freeman	Felix von Manteuffel	Felix von Manteuffel	Simon Jones
Prosser	Bill Wallis		Bill Wallis	Joe Melia	Michael Cule	Bruce Hyman	Steve Pemberton	Wolfgang Hess	N/A	N/A
Ford Prefect	Geoffrey McGivern	Richard Hope	Geoffrey McGivern	David Dixon	Tom Finnis	Geoffrey McGivern	Mos Def	Markus Boysen	Ingo Hülsmann	Geoffrey McGivern
Lady Cynthia Fitzmelton	Jo Kendall		N/A	N/A	N/A	N/A	N/A	Doris Schade	N/A	N/A
The barman	David Gooderson		Stephen Moore	Steve Conway	N/A	N/A	Albie Woodington		N/A	N/A
Prostetnic Vogon Jeltz	Bill Wallis	Michael Cule♦	Bill Wallis	Martin Benson	N/A	Toby Longworth	Richard Griffiths (voice)	Peter Lühr	N/A	N/A
Zaphod Beeblebrox	Mark Wing-Davey	Ken Ellis♠	Mark Wing-Davey	Mark Wing-Davey	Francis Johnson	Mark Wing-Davey	Sam Rockwell	Klaus Löwitsch	Mathias Fuchs	Mark Wing-Davey
Tricia McMillan ("Trillian")	Susan Sheridan	Sue Jones-Davies♥	Cindy Oswin	Sandra Dickinson	Tali	Susan Sheridan as "Trillian" Sandra Dickinson as "Tricia McMillan"	Zooey Deschanel	Barbara Freier	Kornelia Boje	Susan Sheridan as "Trillian" Sandra Dickinson as "Tricia McMillan"
Eddie the Shipboard Computer	David Tate		David Tate	David Tate	N/A	Roger Gregg	Tom Lennon	Ignaz Kirchner	Matthias Ponnier	N/A
Marvin the Paranoid Android	Stephen Moore	David Learner♦♠	Stephen Moore	David Learner (costume) Stephen Moore (voice)	N/A	Stephen Moore	Warwick Davis (costume); Alan Rickman (voice)	Martin Flörchinger	Martin Flörchinger	Jim Broadbent
Vogon Guard	David Tate		N/A	Michael Cule	N/A	Bob Golding		Joachim Höppner	N/A	N/A
Newsreader	David Tate	David Tate	Rayner Bourton	N/A	N/A	Kelly Macdonald		N/A	N/A	N/A
Gag Halfrunt	Stephen Moore		Stephen Moore	Gil Morris	N/A	N/A	Jason Schwartzman		N/A	N/A
The whale	Stephen Moore		Stephen Moore	Stephen Moore	N/A	N/A	Bill Bailey	Bernhard Minetti	N/A	N/A
Magrathean message voice ("Ghostly Image")	Richard Vernon		Richard Vernon	Richard Vernon	N/A	N/A	Simon Jones	Dieter Borsche	N/A	N/A
Slartibartfast	Richard Vernon		Richard Vernon	Richard Vernon	Janos Kuruz	Richard Griffiths	Bill Nighy	Dieter Borsche	Horst Bollmann	N/A
Lunkwill (First Computer Programmer)	Ray Hassett		Cindy Oswin	Antony Carrick	N/A	N/A	Jack Stanley		N/A	N/A
Fook (Second Computer Programmer)	Jeremy Browne		David Tate	Timothy Davies	N/A	N/A	Dominique Jackson		N/A	N/A
Vroomfondel	James Broadbent		James Broadbent	Charles McKeown	N/A	N/A	N/A		N/A	N/A
Majikthise	Jonathan Adams		David Tate	David Leland	N/A	N/A	N/A		N/A	N/A
Deep Thought	Geoffrey McGivern	Michael Cule♦	Valentine Dyall	Valentine Dyall	N/A	N/A	Helen Mirren	Hans Reinhard Müller	N/A	N/A
Magrathean Public Address Voice	Ray Hassett		Douglas Adams	David Tate	N/A	N/A			N/A	N/A
Frankie Mouse	Peter Hawkins		Stephen Moore	Stephen Moore	N/A	N/A	Garth Jennings		N/A	N/A
Benjy Mouse	David Tate		David Tate	David Tate	N/A	N/A	Zoe Kubaisi		N/A	N/A
Humma Kavula	N/A	N/A	N/A	N/A	N/A	N/A	John Malkovich	N/A	N/A	N/A
Questular Rontok	N/A	N/A	N/A	N/A	N/A	N/A	Anna Chancellor	N/A	N/A	N/A
Kwaltz, a Vogon	N/A	N/A	N/A	N/A	N/A	N/A	Ian McNeice (voice)	N/A	N/A	N/A
Shooty	James Broadbent		Stephen Moore	Matt Zimmerman	Douglas Adams	N/A	N/A	N/A		N/A
Bang-Bang	Ray Hassett		James Broadbent	Marc Smith	Ed Victor	N/A	N/A		N/A	N/A
Garkbit	Anthony Sharp		Anthony Sharp	Jack May	N/A	N/A	N/A	Alexander Malachovsky	N/A	N/A
Max Quordlepleen	Roy Hudd		Roy Hudd	Colin Jeavons	N/A	Roy Hudd	N/A	Herbert Fleischmann	N/A	N/A
Reg Nullify	N/A	N/A	Graham de Wilde	N/A	N/A	N/A	N/A	N/A	N/A	N/A
The Great Prophet Zarquon	Anthony Sharp		Anthony Sharp	Colin Bennett	N/A	William Franklyn	N/A	Wolf Goldan	N/A	N/A
Dish of the Day	N/A	Michael Cule♦	N/A	Peter Davison	N/A	N/A	N/A	N/A	N/A	N/A
Hotblack Desiato	N/A	N/A	N/A	Barry Frank Warren	N/A	N/A	N/A	N/A	N/A	N/A
Bodyguard	N/A	Michael Cule♦	David Tate	Dave Prowse	N/A	N/A	N/A	N/A	N/A	N/A
Haggunenon Underfleet Commander	Aubrey Woods		N/A	N/A	N/A	N/A	N/A		N/A	N/A
B Ark Captain	David Jason	Michael Cule♦	Frank Middlemass	Aubrey Morris	N/A	N/A	N/A		N/A	N/A
Number One	Jonathan Cecil		David Tate	Matthew Scurfield	N/A	N/A	N/A		N/A	N/A
Number Two	Aubrey Woods		Stephen Grief	David Neville	N/A	N/A	N/A		N/A	N/A
Number Three	N/A	N/A	N/A	Geoffrey Beevers	N/A	N/A	N/A	N/A	N/A	N/A
Marketing Girl	Beth Porter		Leueen Willoughby	Beth Porter	N/A	N/A	N/A		N/A	N/A
Management Consultant	Jonathan Cecil		David Tate	Jon Glover	N/A	N/A	N/A		N/A	N/A
Hairdresser	Aubrey Woods		Stephen Grief	David Rowlands	N/A	N/A	N/A		N/A	N/A
Caveman	David Jason				N/A	N/A	N/A		N/A	N/A
Character's Name	Primary and Secondary Phases	Stage Adaptation (specify)	LP Adaptations	TV series	Illustrated Edition (hardcover book)	Tertiary to Quintessential Phases	Movie	German Radio Series One	German Radio Series Two	Hexagonal Phase

♦ "The Rainbow" production ♥ Science Fiction Theatre of Liverpool production ♠ Theatr Clwyd Production

== Additional cast for the Secondary Phase ==
- Covering the BBC Radio 4 Secondary Phase (1979—1980).

Cast lists for Radio Series Two of The Hitchhiker's Guide to the Galaxy.
Character's Name	Secondary Phase
Frogstar Robot	Geoffrey McGivern
Arcturan Number One	Bill Paterson
Arcturan Captain/Radio Voice	David Tate
Hitchhiker's Guide Receptionist	David Tate
Lift	David Tate
Roosta	Alan Ford
Frogstar Prisoner Relations Officer	David Tate
Gargravarr	Valentine Dyall
Vogon Captain	Bill Wallis
Vogon Guard	Stephen Moore/David Tate
Vogon Computer	David Tate
Ventilation System	Geoffrey McGivern
Nutrimat Machine	Leueen Willoughby
Zaphod Beeblebrox IV	Richard Goolden
Bird One	Ronald Baddiley
Bird Two	John Baddeley
Wise Old Bird	John le Mesurier
Footwarrior	John Baddeley
Lintilla (and her clones)	Rula Lenska
Hig Hurtenflurst	Marc Smith
Film Commentator	David Tate
Computeach	David Tate
Pupil	Stephen Moore
Varntvar the priest	Geoffrey McGivern
Android Stewardess	Rula Lenska
The Allitnils	David Tate
Poodoo	Ken Campbell
Autopilot	Jonathan Pryce
Zarniwoop (Vann Harl)	Jonathan Pryce
Man in the Shack	Stephen Moore
Character's Name	Secondary Phase

== Additional cast for the Tertiary to Quintessential Phases ==
- Covering the BBC Radio 4 radio series 3-5 (2004–2005) and the Bavarian Radio/Southwest radio adaptations in 1990-1991.

Cast lists for different versions of The Hitchhiker's Guide to the Galaxy. A blank cell in the table indicates that the information is unknown. "N/A" indicates that the role in question does not exist for that version of the story.
Character's Name	Tertiary to Quintessential Phases	German Radio Series Two
Hitchhiker's Guide Receptionist		N/A
Lift	Michael Fenton Stevens	N/A
Vogon Captain	Toby Longworth	N/A
Vogon Guard	Bob Golding	N/A
Lintilla (and her clones)	Rula Lenska	N/A
Zarniwoop (Vann Harl)	Jonathan Pryce	N/A
Wowbagger (the Infinitely Prolonged)	Toby Longworth	N/A
Zem the Mattress	Andy Taylor	
Krikkit Robots	Dominic Hawksley	
Walkie Talkie	Fiona Carew	N/A
The Boy	Theo Maggs	
Deodat	Bruce Hyman	N/A
Cricket Commentator #1	Henry Blofeld as himself	
Cricket Commentator #2	Fred Trueman as himself	Walter Hohe
Wikkit Voice	Dominic Hawksley	Heinz Schimmelpfennig
Agrajag	Douglas Adams	Klaus Herm
Judiciary Pag	Rupert Degas	Bruno Ganz
Krikkit Man One	Michael Fenton Stevens	Bernd Wesselmann
Krikkit Man Two	Philip Pope	Andreas Serda
Krikkit Man Three	Tom Maggs	Joachim Prech
Mancunian Correcting-Fluid Magnate	Michael Fenton Stevens	
Krikkit songwriter	Philip Pope	
Thor	Dominic Hawksley	Edgar Hoppe
Woman with the Sydney Opera House head	Joanna Lumley	
Party Doorman	Paul Wickens	
Hactar	"Young" voice: Geoffrey McGivern "Dust cloud" voice: Leslie Phillips	Peter Lieck
Krikkit Commander	Dominic Hawksley	
Dispatcher	Bob Golding	
Silastic Armorfiends	Bob Golding	
Elder of Krikkit	Dominic Hawksley	
Krikkit Civilian	Bob Golding	
Prak	Chris Langham	
The Book's "update voice"	Rula Lenska	N/A
Rob McKenna	Bill Paterson	Otto Sander
Fenchurch (Fenny)	Jane Horrocks	Nina Hoger
Barman (Old Pink Dog Bar)	Arthur Smith	N/A
Russell	Rupert Degas	Eberhard Feik
Alien Teaser	Bob Golding	
Stewardess	Alison Pettitt	N/A
Hooker	Fiona Carew	N/A
Vogon Helmsman	Michael Cule	N/A
Evil-looking bird	Chris Emmett	N/A
Canis Pontiff	Chris Emmett	N/A
Raffle Woman	June Whitfield	
BT Operator	Ann Bryson	N/A
Barmaid	Ann Bryson	
Jim (bartender)	Simon Greenall	
News Anchor 1	Simon Greenall	
News Anchor 2	Ann Bryson	
Speaking Clock	Brian Cobby	N/A
Zirzla Leader	David Dixon	N/A
Ecological Man	David Dixon	
Arthur's BBC Boss	Geoffrey Perkins	
Murray Bost Henson	Stephen Fry	Heinz Meier
East River Creature	Jackie Mason	
Vogon Councillor	Dominic Hawksley	N/A
Steward	Simon Greenall	
Mrs Kapelsen	Margaret Robertson	
Vogon Clerk	Michael Cule	N/A
Wonko the Sane (John Watson)	Christian Slater	Hans Christian Blech
Tricia McMillan (parallel Earth)	Sandra Dickinson	N/A
The Lajestic Vantrasheel of Lob	Bob Golding	
Radio commentators	Nick Clarke as himself Charlotte Green as herself Peter Donaldson as himself Sir Patrick Moore as himself	
First Grebulon	Andy Taylor	N/A
Second Grebulon	Michael Fenton Stevens	N/A
Prophet	John Challis	N/A
Information Creature	Mitch Benn	N/A
Gail Andrews	Lorelei King	N/A
Colin the Robot	Andrew Secombe	N/A
Old Man on the Pole	Saeed Jaffrey	N/A
Smelly Photocopier Woman	Miriam Margolyes	N/A
Stewardess	Lorelei King	N/A
Accountancy Bird #1	Roger Gregg	N/A
Accountancy Bird #2	Michael Fenton Stevens	N/A
Accountancy Bird #3	Danny Flint	N/A
Lift	Roger Gregg	N/A
Grebulon Underling	Philip Pope	N/A
Grebulon Lieutenant	Michael Fenton Stevens	N/A
Random Frequent Flyer Dent	Samantha Béart	N/A
Old Thrashbarg	Griff Rhys Jones	N/A
Strinder	Roger Gregg	N/A
Doctor	Roger Gregg	N/A
Grebulon Leader	Andy Taylor	N/A
The Patient	Lorelei King	N/A
Bartender (Domain of the King)	Roger Gregg	N/A
Elvis	Philip Pope	N/A
The Newsreader	Neil Sleat	N/A
Runner	Tom Maggs	N/A
Character's Name	Tertiary to Quintessential Phases	German Radio Series Two
