= The Oxford Revue =

University comedy society

- Founded: 1953
- Type: Comedy society
- Current Presidents: Alice Macey-Dare and Sam Bishton
- Website: oxfordrevue.co.uk

The Oxford Revue Logo

The Oxford Revue is a comedy group primarily featuring students from Oxford University and Oxford Brookes University, England. Beginning in 1953, The Oxford Revue has produced many prominent comedians, actors and satirists—as is the case with their Cambridge University counterparts, the Footlights. The Revue writes, produces and performs several shows each term in the pubs and theatres around Oxford, as well as touring to cities in the United Kingdom and performing a month-long run at the Edinburgh Fringe Festival every year.

== History ==
The Oxford Revue was originally just a revue show, not a troupe—one of many yearly productions at the Edinburgh Festival Fringe organised by the Oxford Theatre Group, or O.T.G. (a student-run group co-founded by the brother-in-law of future Revue alumnus Michael Palin). The earliest Revue was called 1953's 'Cakes and Ale', starring Maggie Smith. Other Fringe Revues of historical note include -

- 1958's 'All For Money' (starring Dudley Moore)
- 1964's self-titled 'Oxford Revue' (starring Michael Palin and Terry Jones—David Frost employed the pair on The Frost Report on the basis of this show)
- 1965's 'The Oxford Line' (directed by Palin)
- 1977's 'Beyond A Joke' (starring Rowan Atkinson, Richard Curtis, Howard Goodall and Helen Atkinson-Wood—this later became Rowan Atkinson's first touring professional show, one performance inspiring John Cleese to invite Atkinson to appear at the 1979 version of The Secret Policeman's Ball)
- 1978's 'One's Company' (written by Curtis and starring Tim McInnerny and Angus Deayton—this show featured the first appearances of characters and stories which would later feature in the BBC show Blackadder)
- 1979's 'You'll Have Had Your Tea' (which evolved, cast primarily intact, into the BBC shows Radio Active and KYTV)
- 1987's 'Don't shoot me, I'm only the horses, don't they?' (directed by David Schneider)
- 1988's 'Waving At The Pigeons' (written by Stewart Lee and Richard Herring, then part of the comedy group The Seven Raymonds)
- 1989's self-titled 'Oxford Revue' (directed by Lee and starring Al Murray, as a mix of written comedy, stand up and improvisation).

The term 'Oxford Revue' was initially a generic phrase, used by many Oxford student theatre companies. The Oxford Experimental Theatre Club formed 'The Etceteras' in the early 1960s—this troupe would perform revues around Oxford, while the 'Oxford Revue' would be the main Oxford comedy output at the Fringe. Many students were involved with both endeavours until the late 1970s, when the two troupes began to socially divide—the 1979 Etceteras (then run by Ian Hislop) even brought their own 'Oxford Revue' to the Fringe to directly compete with the O.T.G. offering (then run by Angus Deayton).

By the early 1980s, the Etceteras had disappeared and the 'Oxford Revue' became a troupe which operated in both Oxford and Edinburgh. The 'Oxford Revue Workshop' was an important aspect of Oxford's comedy culture from its 1986 founding to the 1990s—a fortnightly comedy night based in the cellars beneath the Oxford Union building. Stewart Lee, Richard Herring, Emma Kennedy, David Schneider, Al Murray and Armando Iannucci all relied on the 'Workshop' as a performance space during the late 1980s. The Wheatsheaf pub in Oxford became a reliable venue for the Revue during the 2000s, with the Jericho Tavern taking such a role during the 2020s.

Oxford Revue alumni include:

- Michael Palin and Terry Jones (who later became members of Monty Python)
- Dudley Moore (later of Beyond the Fringe, Pete and Dud and Not Only... But Also)
- Alan Bennett (later of Beyond the Fringe)
- Rowan Atkinson
- Maggie Smith
- Al Murray
- Richard Curtis
- Katy Brand
- Stewart Lee
- Ken Loach
- Angus Deayton
- Richard Herring
- Rebecca Front (first female president of the Revue)
- Armando Iannucci
- Philip Pope
- Laura Solon
- Katherine Parkinson
- Peter Harness
- Laura Corcoran and Matthew Floyd Jones
- Sally Phillips
- Guy Browning
- Ben Moor
- Waen Shepherd
- Ben Willbond
- Emma Kennedy
- David Schneider
- Geoffrey Perkins
- Imogen Stubbs
- Patrick Marber
- Frank Cottrell-Boyce
- Kieran Hodgson
- Helen Atkinson Wood
- Howard Goodall
- Marina Hyde

== Recent activities ==
The Revue completed its 72nd Edinburgh Fringe in August 2025, with two shows—the sketch show For Revue Dollars More and the late-night stand-up show Stand-Upping Citizens.

== Mascot and logo ==
The mascot of the Oxford Revue was, for a long time, a pig in a sailor's hat named Admiral Philip, drawn by Revue member Nick Davies in 2013.. In 2021, Philip the Pig's design was updated to include a top hat and bow tie, as well as a New Zealand accent. The Revue now uses a 'Simpsons font' variant, including a 'OR' abbreviation inspired by the Adult Swim logo.
