= Michael Fenton Stevens =

English actor and comedian (born 1958)

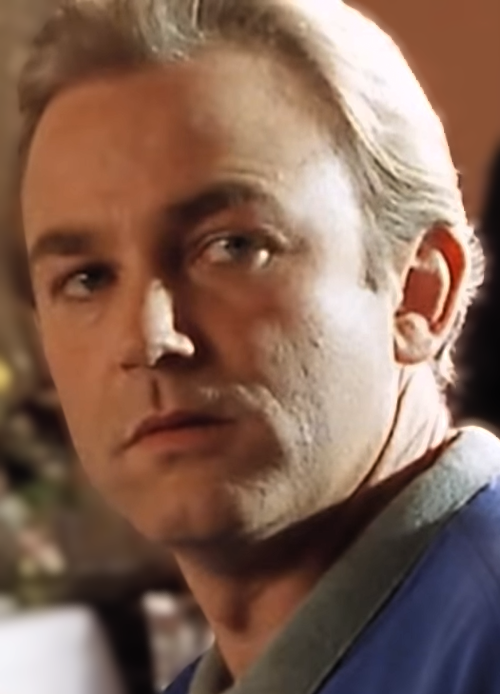
- Stevens in "Mr. Bean in Room 426" (1993)
- Born: Michael Stevens; 12 February 1958 (age 68); London, England
- Occupations: Actor, comedian
- Known for: Television and comedy

Michael Fenton Stevens (born 12 February 1958) is an English actor and comedian. He was a founder member of The Hee Bee Gee Bees and sang the lead on the Spitting Image 1986 number 1 hit "The Chicken Song". He also starred in KYTV, its Radio 4 predecessor Radio Active, and Benidorm, and was an anchor on 3rd & Bird on CBeebies. He appeared as the man staying in room 425 in an episode of the original series of Mr. Bean, entitled "Room 426".

== Career ==
=== Radio and broadcasting ===
Fenton Stevens was one of the principal performers in the Radio 4 comedy series Radio Active during the 1980s, alongside Helen Atkinson-Wood, Angus Deayton, Geoffrey Perkins and Philip Pope, which later led to the television series KYTV. Fenton Stevens is credited with telling the joke (written by Perkins) about Ringo Starr not being the best drummer in the Beatles, frequently misattributed to John Lennon or Jasper Carrott. It was broadcast on Radio Active on 15 September 1981. Though Beatles biographer Mark Lewisohn initially claimed that it was Pope who said the line, Fenton Stevens later clarified that it was actually him. He also told Beatles fan Andrew Dixon that the cast initially thought it was a real joke that the Fab Four had told themselves.

Fenton Stevens also appeared in various roles in Tertiary, Quandary and Quintessential Phases of the Hitchhiker's Guide to the Galaxy radio series. In 2007, he played the similarly named Michael Wenton Weeks in Dirk Gently's Holistic Detective Agency. He plays the eponymous Inspector Steine in Lynne Truss' long-running Radio 4 comedy series.

He has also played a long-running role, Paul Morgan, in the radio soap The Archers.

In 2020, Fenton Stevens released the first of a podcast series, My Time Capsule, produced by his son John Fenton Stevens. The show involves guests choosing four memories they would preserve in a time capsule, and a fifth memory they would wish to bury in the ground and never think about again. Guests have included Stephen Fry, Rebecca Front, Rick Wakeman, Mark Gatiss, Rufus Hound, David Mitchell, Anthony Head, Chris Addison, Rev Richard Coles, Griff Rhys Jones, Richard Herring and David Baddiel. In June 2023, it celebrated its 300th episode.

=== Television ===
Fenton Stevens featured in regular roles as Hank in the 1996 series The Legacy of Reginald Perrin, and as Ralph in Andy Hamilton's 2003 television sitcom Trevor's World of Sport, as well as in the Radio 4 version of the latter which was broadcast in 2004. He had previously appeared in a guest role in Drop the Dead Donkey, another television comedy series written by Hamilton, and appears regularly in various roles in Hamilton's Radio 4 sitcom Old Harry's Game. He has also featured in Ian Hislop's sitcom My Dad's the Prime Minister as the Home Secretary.

From 2004 until 2005 he appeared in two series of Julia Davis's dark comedy series Nighty Night as the Reverend Gordon Fox.

He has provided the voice of Mr Beakman, a toucan, in the CBeebies show 3rd & Bird, and has a recurring role in the sitcom My Family as Mr Griffith, the boss of the dental corporation Cavitex. He has played Sir Henry in Benidorm since series four, which was first broadcast in 2011.

Notable guest appearances have included the next door hotel guest in "Mr. Bean in Room 426", and the brother-in-law of Hee Bee Gee Bees bandmate, Angus Deayton's character in an episode of One Foot in the Grave. He played Alan Perkins, a holiday rep in Spain in "The Unlucky Winner Is" episode of Only Fools And Horses. He also played a guest role in Coronation Street in November 2004. In 2006, he guest-starred in the Doctor Who audio adventure The Kingmaker. He appeared in Series 3 Episode 3 of Outnumbered, as a substitute player called 'Lance' in a tennis match, and in the "Music 2000" episode of Look Around You as the chairman of the Royal Pop and Rock Association. In 2022 he appeared as Tony Vanoli in a fourth season episode of Ghosts.

=== Stage ===
Fenton Stevens has appeared as a Pantomime Dame in a number of pantomimes. From December 2006 until January 2007, he starred in and wrote the Cambridge Arts Theatre pantomime version of Aladdin in the role of Widow Twankey. In 2015, Stevens appeared as Dr. John Radcliffe in the Royal Shakespeare Company's production of Helen Edmundson's Queen Anne.

== Filmography ==
=== Film ===
Year	Title	Role	Notes
2007	The Riddle	Alistair Forsyth M.P.	
2007	Lady Godiva: Back in the Saddle	Roger Tompkins	
2016	Mob Handed	The Police Spokesman	
2017	Carnage	Peter Smithball	
2022	Rogue Agent	Richard Archer	
2023	Harvey Greenfield Is Running Late	Jason Mason	

=== Television ===
Year	Title	Role	Notes
1986	Spitting Image	Various	2 episodes
1988	The Bill	Prof. Wallis	Episode: "Outmoded"
1989	Only Fools and Horses	Alan Perkins	Episode: "The Unlucky Winner Is..."
1993	Mr. Bean	Hotel Guest	Episode: "Mr. Bean in Room 426"
1995	One Foot in the Grave	Geoffrey Croker	Episode: "Hole in the Sky"
1996	The Legacy of Reginald Perrin	Hank Millbeck	5 episodes
1997	The Brittas Empire	Ferguson	Episode: "Exposed"
1997	As Time Goes By	Paul	Episode: "Alistair's Engagement"
2000	Holby City	Bill Moorcroft	Episode: "Faith"
2000	EastEnders	Rev Adam Cherry	2 episodes
2004-2005	Nighty Night	Gordon	6 episodes
2008	Two Pints of Lager and a Packet of Crisps	Pete	Episode: "African Death Face"
2008–2011	My Family	Mr. Griffith	3 episodes
2009	Ladies of Letters	Rev Bruce	Episode: #1.5
2010	Outnumbered	Lance	Episode: "The Tennis Match"
2011–2018	Benidorm	Sir Henry	8 episodes
2012	Parents	Clifford	Episode: #1.1
2012	Mrs Biggs	Fordham QC	Episode: #1.2
2015	Ballot Monkeys	Simon Swann	All 5 episodes
2015	New Tricks	Bertie Richmond	Episode: "The Fame Game"
2015	Josh	Lily's Dad	Episode: "Mum & Dad"
2017	The Crown	Peter Beck	Episode: "Paterfamilias"
2018	Action Team	Mike	Episode: "Mind Games"
2019	Not Going Out	Motoring Service Man	Episode: "Halloween"
2020	Housebound	Benedict	Episode: #1.14
2022	Slow Horses	Leonard Bradley	Episode: "Work Drinks"
2022	Ghosts	Tony Vanoli	Episode: "Gone Gone"
2022	Avenue 5	Lyle	Episode: "Is It a Good Dot?"
2023	Hapless	Ronnie Green	5 episodes
2023	This Is Gay	Pastor	TV film
2023	The Sixth Commandment	Justice Sweeney	Episode: #1.4
2024	Death in Paradise	Tristan Clayborn	Episode: "#13.3"
