= KYTV =

KYTV may refer to:

- KYTV (TV station), a television station (channel 3 virtual/19 digital) licensed to Springfield, Missouri, United States
- KYTV (TV series), a BBC2 comedy series that aired from 1989 to 1993

== See also ==
- Kagoshima Yomiuri Television, Japan
