= Harry & Paul =

British television series

- Harry & Paul title card (series 2)
- Also known as: Ruddy Hell! It's Harry & Paul (series 1)
- Created by: Harry Enfield; Paul Whitehouse
- Starring: Harry Enfield; Paul Whitehouse; Laura Solon; Morwenna Banks; Sophie Winkleman; Simon Greenall; Simon Day; Catherine Shepherd; Kevin Eldon
- Country of origin: United Kingdom
- No. of series: 4
- No. of episodes: 23

Production
- Producer: Geoffrey Perkins (series 1–2)
- Running time: 30 minutes
- Production company: Tiger Aspect Productions

Original release
- Network: BBC One (2007–2008); BBC Two (2010–2012)
- Release: 13 April 2007 – 2 December 2012
- Release: 25 May 2014
- Release: 31 August 2015
- Release: 27 October 2022

Related
- Harry Enfield's Brand Spanking New Show

Harry & Paul (originally titled Ruddy Hell! It's Harry & Paul) is a British sketch comedy show starring Harry Enfield and Paul Whitehouse. It was first broadcast on BBC One on 13 April 2007. Prior to broadcast, it was trailed as The Harry Enfield Show.

The show reunites the pair, who had success with Harry Enfield's Television Programme (later titled Harry Enfield & Chums) in the 1990s.

The second series of the programme began on BBC1 on 5 September 2008. This was the last TV series from the comedy producer Geoffrey Perkins, who died shortly before transmission. A third series was commissioned and began on 28 September 2010, this time on BBC2, where the show had been moved to because of falling ratings. The fourth series was broadcast in 2012.

== First series ==

The first series' opening sequence is a parody of a skin care advertisement, and shows the two main female cast members (Morwenna Banks and Laura Solon) being given a pint of lager before the footage speeds rapidly as the women have make-up removed and hair cut, and are given cigarettes and hamburgers, followed by noodles and more cigarettes. As the make-up and hair are removed, it becomes clear the two women were Harry Enfield and Paul Whitehouse.

== Second series ==
In the opening sequence of the second series, Enfield and Whitehouse appear as two ageing Soviet-style dictators reviewing a parade. They wave grimly down at the procession, supposedly an example of an ancient and outdated means of politics, whilst a lyric concerning how they are "both incredibly handsome and tall" and "not even beginning to look old" is sung. The melody is based on the Russian national anthem. They also appear picking up three television awards – a National Television Award, a Bafta and a British Comedy Award. Visitors to the British Comedy Guide website voted it the Best British TV Sketch Show of 2008 in The Comedy.co.uk Awards.

According to Enfield and Whitehouse, the title sequence is a self-referential joke at the fact that the pair are "a pair of old-timers out of touch with the modern world", while, they claim, sketch comedy is a "young man's game".

The second series used fewer celebrity characters than the first.

== Third series ==
A third series was confirmed by Paul Whitehouse on the TV sketch show Horne & Corden. It had a new producer as the producer Geoffrey Perkins died in 2008, shortly before the second series was broadcast. Series 3 ran between 28 October and 2 December 2010, once again for 6 episodes. Unlike the first two series, it contained no audience laugh track.

Enfield and Whitehouse won a BAFTA for the second time in 2011, following the third series.

== Fourth series ==
Whilst appearing on The Alan Titchmarsh Show on 1 April 2011, Paul Whitehouse confirmed that the show had been recommissioned despite reports suggesting it had been cancelled earlier in the year. It began broadcasting on Sunday nights from 28 October 2012 with five new episodes followed by a repeat of the Series 3 best-of compilation episode.

== Specials ==
=== Story of the 2s ===
Enfield and Whitehouse reunited for a one-hour special, which aired on 25 May 2014 as part of celebratory programmes marking the 50th anniversary of BBC Two, entitled Harry & Paul's Story of the 2s. The title is a parody of Simon Schama's 2013 BBC Two documentary The Story of the Jews. It featured various parodies and sketches based on BBC Two programmes joined together in a mockumentary format looking at the history of the channel, including:

- The Great War
- Night News (Newsnight) and Naughty Nightie News (Late Night Line-Up)
- The Forsyte Saga
- Men Behaving Likely Ladly (The Likely Lads and Men Behaving Badly)
- Keep Still (Test Card F broadcast for 8 hours per day)
- Open University
- Pot Black, with competitors attempting to pick up female members of the audience, drinking heavily, smoking and taking drugs.
- The Pottering About of Man (The Ascent of Man)
- Monty Python's Flying Circus (with Michael Palin's travel documentaries and Fawlty Towers)
- One Clavdivs (I, Claudius)
- The Old Grey Wrinkly Testicle (The Old Grey Whistle Test)
- Speech Impediment (Call My Bluff)
- Men from the Mersey (a pro-Tory version of Boys from the Blackstuff)
- 40 Minutes
- Not Monty Python's Nine O'Clock News (Not the Nine O'Clock News)
- Blackadder with a fictional pilot episode based on the abdication of Edward VIII
- Talking Heads of State (Talking Heads, portraying leaders such as Joseph Stalin)
- Arena
- Top Gear in its 2002 incarnation
- The Young Ones
- Harry Emery & Chums (The Dick Emery Show and Harry Enfield & Chums)
- Dennis from Heaven (Pennies from Heaven and The Singing Detective)
- The Fast Show
- Is Your Child An Idiot? (The Weakest Link)
- The Office
- Grumpy Old Bores/Grumpy Old Bags (Grumpy Old Men and Grumpy Old Women)
- Smarmnite (Newsnight Review)
- I'm Better Than You (The Apprentice, MasterChef, and The Great British Bake Off)
- Earlier with Jools Holland (a breakfast television version of Later... with Jools Holland where all the musicians are still asleep)
- Miserabel (various Nordic noir series)
- Panel Show, a parody of panel game shows including Have I Got News for You, Never Mind the Buzzcocks, Mock the Week and QI
- The War to End All Wars (BBC World War I centenary season)

=== An Evening with Harry Enfield and Paul Whitehouse ===
This one-hour special was broadcast in August 2015. Harry and Paul took questions from an audience of celebrities (played mostly by Harry and Paul themselves) and showed clips from Harry Enfield and Chums, Harry Enfield's Television Programme, The Fast Show and Harry & Paul.

Celebrities played by Harry and Paul included Rob Brydon, Harry Hill, Ricky Gervais, Stephen Fry, Melvyn Bragg, Mark Rylance and Stephen Hawking. Enfield also revived his fictional character Dave Nice.

=== The Love Box in Your Living Room ===
This was a 1-hour special in October 2022 parodying the documentary style of Adam Curtis to celebrate the 100th anniversary of the BBC.

== Characters (main series only) ==
=== Series 1 ===
Character	Description
Nelson Mandela	Advertisements featuring Nelson Mandela (Harry Enfield) selling various narcotics (such as "Nelson Mandela's Crackabis") and alcohol (such as "Nelson Mandela's Alcopops"). He has also promoted shoplifting with the introduction of "Nelson Mandela's Thieving Coat". He also promotes absinthe, smack n' crack party pack (mixture of smack and crack in a Happy Meal-type box), ecstasy tablets, "fighting beer" (a drink which causes the consumer to become violent) and a website with "dirty grannies".
José Arrogantio	Self-obsessed football manager, a parody of then Chelsea F.C. manager José Mourinho (Paul Whitehouse), who defends the actions of player Didier Pesković (Enfield), a parody of Didier Drogba. Often, he is so busy posing for the camera that he misses Pesković's unorthodox tactics such as stabbing another player in the groin with a corner flag or shooting another player with a bazooka.
The Leccy Spongers	A parody of Waking the Dead, where four police officers are shown investigating a crime scene, but end up forgetting about the task and instead search for nearby plug sockets to recharge their portable electronic devices, such as iPods, TomToms and Game Boys. Played by all four of the main cast.
Bono and The Edge	Bono (Enfield) and The Edge (Whitehouse) from U2 sit in their flat talking about each other's humorous names and catching up with the latest ways in which Bono has been making history. Bono will often shout a question beginning "what in the naaaaaaame of love...?" in a reference to the song "Pride (In the Name of Love)". There is usually a joke revolving around what The Edge has under his skullcap (that the real Edge seldom takes off). In one case he is growing cress under it. Both speak with stereotypical Irish accents.
Madonna and Guy	Madonna (Morwenna Banks) and Guy Ritchie (Enfield) having a discussion about their day with Ritchie ending most of his sentences with "Don'cha know? Don'cha know? For facks sake.", before getting into a fight at the dinner table ending in Ritchie getting a kick in the groin. The joke of these sketches seems to focus on the awkward balance between the often explicit and, occasionally offensive, nature of the Ritchies' respective works and their apparent desire to enjoy the trappings of an upper-class and highly civilised private life at the same time.
Ronald and Pam	Eccentric, but always friendly American tourists from Badiddlyboing, Odawidaho (Enfield and Alice Lowe). They invite everyone they meet to visit, and always have their photo albums on them to show. As Pam flicks through their albums, Ronald always comments 'ain't she pretty' for the ladies and 'what a guy' for the men in the photos, even with an album of photos from Egypt where all the women have their face covered.
Very Important Man	Stereotype of a self-righteous banker from the City of London (Enfield). He always feels compelled to tell everyone how superior he is, whilst in reality he is an insecure, arrogant, sexist pig.
The Computer Tycoons	Computer tycoons Bill Gates (Whitehouse) and Steve Jobs (Enfield) give each other orgasms by describing their respective technology (while unaware that their trophy wives are also having affairs).
I Saw You Coming	A cynical Notting Hill antiques shop salesman (Enfield) sells junk to gullible wealthy women (usually portrayed by Sophie Winkleman) for extortionately large quantities of money. In the second series, the salesman also owns a store called 'Modern Wank' claiming to his customers that it is considered retro to mix old items with modern furniture.
Posh Scaffolders	Builders (Enfield and Whitehouse) who converse on a range of highbrow subjects such as theatre, only stopping to barrage young women with stereotypical builder sexist and vulgar verbal abuse.
Pet Northerner	A posh family delight in showing their friends their pet Geordie, Clive (Whitehouse).
Jamie and Oliver	Two obese teenagers (Enfield and Whitehouse) who eat large quantities of junk food wherever they go. A dig at celebrity chef Jamie Oliver who at the time was campaigning for healthier school meals.
Café Polski	A seemingly normal man (Enfield) orders a cappuccino while the women at the counter (Banks and Laura Solon) talk to each other in "Polish", usually mocking him or fighting each other. The man eventually develops a love for one of the servers (Solon) and often ends up day dreaming or appearing slightly dazed when talking to her.
Roman Abramovich	The chairman of Chelsea F.C. (Whitehouse) is portrayed as a super-rich man, who thinks he can buy anything and everything he likes, such as a young Chelsea fan, the White House, without thinking the President will need it, and even Liverpool's UEFA Champions League wins, much to the disdain of the famous 'Scousers' from Harry Enfield & Chums.
Barbican Man	A Geordie man (Enfield) walks into a newsagent accompanied by the song "Tiger Feet" by Mud and asks the shopkeeper for fictional versions of various day-to-day items. His dialogue always consists of: "How there man, have you got any barbican (somethings), they're like the normal (somethings), but with all the (something) taken out." For example, "Barbican Mars Bars", which are just like normal Mars Bars, but with all the chocolate and nougat taken out. It is based on an unsuccessful 1970s product, Barbican lager, a non-alcoholic beverage, originally advertised by Geordie football manager Lawrie McMenemy.
Pik	A series of monologues by a South African ex rugby player (Enfield) who now works in a gym in England. Stories mostly revolve around drinking, fighting and women. The comedy relies on stereotypes, accents and gormless expressions.
The Surgeons	Charles and Sheridan, two highly cultured surgeons (Enfield and Whitehouse), work at high speed on patients whilst cracking jokes and telling stories giving themselves more time to follow their other pursuits or attend medical conferences. During internal examinations often ask each other "Who does that remind you of?". "You may feel a little discombobulation."
Wash Your Hands	Ashley (Whitehouse)'s wife (Banks) is pregnant and paranoid about germs, infections and meningitis. She is spoilt by her father (Enfield) who buys her whatever she wants. In one instance he buys Ashley a special pram which she wheels in from the car, she claims he has brought germs, bacteria and Dust Mice (meaning to say dust mites) into the house. After this her father says to Ashley, "Wheeled it? You should have carried it, you numpty". Ashley's wife and her father have a hug after he promises to dismantle the house brick by brick. Quotes in this sketch include "'ands, Ashley" "You want me to lose this baby, don't cha?" and "End of the day, Dad, you're the best dad in the world, Dad, end of".
The Chocolatier	A man (Whitehouse) able to render women powerless by revealing a large selection of chocolate, for example in a job interview and in a restaurant.
Jasper Hazelnut	A thinly-disguised parody of Hugh Fearnley-Whittingstall (Enfield). Jasper is a chef so enthusiastic about cooking unusual dishes that he fails to notice that his wife has left him, that his country house is to be demolished to make way for a bypass and that his mother has fallen down the stairs.
TV Couple	The husband (Whitehouse) becomes amused while describing in detail the actions of "The Greek Mr Bean" (whose murmurs are audible in the background), including the predictable near future events; essentially stating the obvious. His wife (Banks) laughs and is equally entertained although she does not speak. They have also been shown watching a semi-egotistical rant by Ricky Gervais, which they question the popularity of.
Back Down	A man (Enfield) unable to back down from any argument, usually over the pronunciation of a proper noun. After the other man (Whitehouse) concedes defeat, Can't Back Down calms down and tells the other man's son that he was lucky he didn't assault the boy's father. He then makes a similar mistake, but having learnt his lesson the other man does not try to correct him again.
Divorcing Couple	A couple going through a divorce, who begin to connect again whenever they meet up. As the wife (Banks) begins to suggest cancelling the divorce, the husband (Enfield) is distracted by things such as text messaging or trying to watch Big Brother. His lack of attention leads to an argument, ending with the wife intending to see the divorce through.

=== Series 2 ===
Character	Description
Dragons' Den	Spoof of the BBC television show Dragons' Den. Four "Dragons" are parodied, Deborah Meaden as The Grumpy Woman (Enfield); Theo Paphitis is sent up as Theo Profiterole (Whitehouse); Duncan Bannatyne turns into Duncan Guillotine (Whitehouse), and Peter Jones becomes John Lewis (Enfield); smiling inanely while insulting the contestants, who have submitted a ludicrous idea such as a new month, whose fatal product flaw is often noticed by Duncan after interest from the dragons. All four dragons then renounce the product, insult the inventors and are "out". The sketch also features a parody of Evan Davis (Whitehouse). James Caan was not featured until series three, possibly due to only becoming a recent member of the real series and as yet having no discernible character traits. Alan Sugar and the Dragons once have an insult-slinging match, which soon degenerates into childishness. A special 'Victorian Dragons' Den parody was produced for Red Nose Day 2009, featuring the actual Dragons presenting genuine innovations (the toothbrush, the toilet/indoor plumbing and the television set) which are all shot down as being hopeless. The sketch specifically parodies some of the criticisms of Enfield & Whitehouse's portrayal of the Dragons (specifically Whitehouse's portrayal of Paphitis, with his take on Bannatyne breaking the fourth wall to mock it and ultimately the real Paphitis acting like the impersonation). In series 3, Duncan Bannatyne is renamed to Duncan Genocide, Deborah Meaden is still featured as the Grumpy Woman, Peter Jones is renamed to Peter 'Nick Clegg' Jones, Theo Paphitis is called Theo Thefoetus, and James Caan is featured as James Yes we Caan. Series 4 sees the arrival of Hilary Devey in place of James Caan as the terrifying Hilary Mother-Trucker R.I.P, additionally Peter Jones, Duncan Bannatyne and Theo Paphitis are renamed Peter Squeaky-Clean, Duncan Frightening and Theo Phridiculous, while Deborah Meaden remains The Grumpy Woman.
The Writer and the Landlady	A sketch in the vein of a film noir horror film, it is black and white except for a dead canary. A well-spoken man with a moustache (Whitehouse) enters a small hotel and sits down at the bar before the somewhat disturbed landlady (Enfield), who will address him with "I see you're a writer, sir..." or suchlike, before telling him about a deceased, unwell or mentally ill relative, such as her late father and her sister whom she claims is "a simpleton." He will then explain his profession and proceed to ask her if she has heard of any of his creations, to which she will reply "Perhaps". He names each in turn, whilst she replies with "No", "'Fraid not", "Doesn't ring a bell" or "Not that I recall", before a noise distracts her and she looks away, turning back to find an empty seat before her. Then shown is a clock with its hands at five thirty, and a doll's face, before the lady turns and walks away. In the first occurrence of the character, the Writer was a writer of children's books (for example "No Potatoes For Pat"). In his second appearance he was a confectionery maker, fabricating such items as "fludge". In his appearance in the last episode of Series 2 he was a children's book writer again, this time writing books based on racial slurs, such as "Simon Bags a Jap", "Roderick Nets a Blackie" and "Roderick Wins the Empire Medal" and in the third series he ends up writing children's books based on a boy named Peter who spends most of his time digging up potatoes and talking to his papa. This sketch bears a strong resemblance to a scene from Carol Reed's The Third Man, where Holly Martins, an unemployed pulp fiction novelist, lists some of his books to an interlocutor who has never heard of them. It also shares similarities with many of David Lynch's films.
Yeah, we can do that	A sketch about Father and Son builders. Two people are discussing what might make their property slightly better, and two builders – father (Whitehouse) and son (Enfield) – appear and offer to do the work, using only "4be2be4be2be" wood. One example has included a couple that mentioned that their commute was quite long, and so the builders built an Underground station next to their house. They of course never charge for their impressive labour. In each sketch the father is always shown hitting his thumb with a hammer and reading the Racing Post, smoking a cigarette.
Cultured Fisherman	A man (Whitehouse) who tries to strike up a cultured conversation with his stereotypically working class fishing friend (Enfield), about a high-brow event or broadcast he'd recently caught. In order not to appear like he actually cares, he plays down his interest, adding phrases such as "...or some sort of shit like that" to his sentences, but gradually lets it slip that he actually enjoyed and appreciated it.
Multilingual Manager	A take on how many different English football players are from overseas. The manager (Whitehouse) will walk into the changing room and proceed to give a team talk, before going between each person of different nationality and explaining it to them in a comical approximation of their own language and accent. He even sings to a South African player, makes gestures toward a deaf player (some of which imply he takes cocaine and is lecherous), and speaks Latin to a player in Roman armour. Regional dialects/stereotypes are also used, as when he reaches the English player, he tells him in a cockney accent that if a certain person gets past them again, they should break his leg or ankles. On one occasion, the team burst into "We Are the World".
Movie Originals	Sketches purporting to be clips from the 'original' black-and-white British versions of contemporary films such as The Bourne Identity and Basic Instinct. One sketch has the leg-crossing scene from Basic Instinct performed by Margaret Rutherford (Enfield).
The Rap DJs	Elderly Radio 3 DJs Henry Glass and Clarence Sugarman (Enfield and Whitehouse), who host "Rap Sunday". In between songs they discuss things that old people generally talk about. They have a slogan for their show which is "Hip Hop Hooray". In one sketch they have a rap battle with some typical hip hop 'gangstas', only to have their Toyota Yaris stall. These sketches were written by Robert Popper. The characters are Jewish, and much of the humour is based on life in the Jewish areas of north-west London; e.g. there is mention of a 'memorial bench to Biggie Smalls on the Heath extension' and jokes about driving very slowly along the A406 (North Circular Road), visiting a garden centre in Whetstone, and shopping at Brent Cross. The characters are reminiscent of the Jewish cockney comedian Charlie Chester who in his later years hosted a BBC radio programme.
I Saw You Coming	The Notting Hill antiques shop salesman (Enfield) returns from series 1, but has now opened some new shops selling overpriced items – 'Modern Wank', 'Le Grocer' and 'Blondes of a certain age'. The music at the start of the clip is "Got To Get Away" by John Holt.
Nelson Mandela	Nelson Mandela returns, this time taking former world leaders like Fidel Castro or Margaret Thatcher for a walk in their wheelchair. It usually portrays Mandela dumping them off a cliff for some reason (to get Castro's iPhone or to shut Thatcher up). He also steals bikes and composes copyright infringing music.
Returning characters	Some characters return from Series 1, while keeping the same formula. These include Charles and Sheridan, the posh scaffolders (who get upset and stop the insulting when a woman tells them how it hurt her feelings), Pam and Ronald, Clive the Geordie (who engages in the Henley Annual Northerner Show, and has a controversial sketch involving a Filipina maid), the Polish Cafe Servers (Simon, the customer, finally gets a date with Magda, but it is then revealed that she has a very attractive sister, who Simon seems instantly besotted with), Pik the South African, the Chocolatier and a couple watching television.

=== Series 3 ===
Character	Description
Dragons' Den	Spoof of the BBC television show Dragons' Den. Five "Dragons" are parodied, Deborah Meaden as The Grumpy Woman (Enfield); Theo Paphitis as Theo Thefoetus (Whitehouse); Duncan Bannatyne turns into Ducan Genocide (Whitehouse); James Caan as James Yes We Caan and Peter Jones becomes Peter 'Nick Clegg' Jones (Enfield). The sketch also features a parody of Evan Davis (Whitehouse).
I Saw You Coming	The Notting Hill antiques shop salesman (Enfield) returns from series 2.
Is He A Queer	Two elderly, upper-class members of a London gentleman's club who constantly question the sexuality of various figures in British culture, often via articles in the newspaper. Whilst they have a predilection for believing the people they discuss are homosexual they often ask their gay acquaintance "Bunny" (Charlie Higson) for an opinion that helps determine their choice. Their conclusions are, invariably, completely wrong.
Mr Psycho Bean	A cross between Mr. Bean and Norman Bates (from Psycho), his methods of getting what he wants or getting around problems involve killing one or more people in his way.
The Benefits	Three generations of a family living on benefits who are noisy, rude and disruptive wherever they go, wanting to buy lotto tickets and other things from places that don't sell them.
Parking Pataweyo	A parody of Postman Pat, involving a stereotypical African traffic warden who is quick to issue parking tickets to anyone who illegally parks for more than a few seconds. Played by future Academy Award winner Daniel Kaluuya.
The Silver-Haired Beatles	An imagining of The Beatles as they would be now, had they never died, taken drugs, or been in any real controversy. They are still immensely successful, producing new music seemingly at will (which causes everyone who hears it to love The Beatles) but often run into some sort of mischief. The sketches are written in the style of Alun Owen's screenplay for A Hard Day's Night and the Beatles' own 1960s press conferences. They often meet at a tea shop, run by Liverpudlian 'Jimmy Tarbuck', played by Simon Greenall. The shop is actually called Tarbucks, riffing on the coffee chain Starbucks. John Henshaw plays their manager, Lewis Macleod plays Paul McCartney, Kevin Eldon doubles as Ringo Starr and George Martin, and Philip Pope provides the music and singing voices.
Radio 4	A producer and a presenter make programmes for Radio 4 about seemingly uninteresting subjects, and then compound the situation by speaking, not profoundly, but banally, about the already unpromising subject matter. They are however, such is the esteem for the station, able to stop things such as a burglary, and trespass on private property, even quieten rowdy children, when they mention that they are working for Radio 4. Then everybody asks when the show is, only to resume what was happening before the pair showed up, as if nothing happened.
Returning characters	Some characters return from Season 2 including the Polish Cafe Servers, The Consultant Surgeons, Charles and Sheridan, The Chocolatier, and in the last episode Pam and Ronald.

=== Series 4 ===
Character	Description
Minor Royals	An obscure royal couple talk to people in everyday situations (including a park and a corner shop in Willesden) as if they are on a state visit. Played by Enfield and special guest star Victoria Wood.
Question Time	A spoof edition of the BBC debate show Question Time, that satirises typical clichéd questions asked by audiences in the real show. David Dimbleby and the panel played by Enfield, audience played by Whitehouse.
Celebrate Like the Arabs	One or more characters fire rounds from AK47's after something positive happens.
Everything's Better in Scotland	An irritatingly smug Scottish man approaches the bartender in his local pub, enquiring after items (including Scottish bitter, English whisky, and the weather) attempting to prove Caledonian superiority to the chagrin of the barman. Played by Enfield.
The 50s Typists	Two East End working-class secretaries (Whitehouse and Eldon) make catty remarks about each other and their acquaintances in 1950s London.
Returning characters	Some characters return from the previous series including Charles and Sheridan, Dragons' Den, I Saw You Coming, Is He A Queer?, and Parking Pataweyo.

== Filipina maid controversy ==
Philippines foreign secretary Alberto Romulo complained to the British Embassy about a "Clive the Geordie" sketch in the fourth episode of the second series, in which the character is urged by his "owner" to mate (unsuccessfully) with a neighbour's Filipina maid. An online petition started by the "Philippine Foundation" condemned the sketch as "completely disgraceful, distasteful and a great example of gutter humour... inciting stereotyped racial discrimination, vulgarity and violation of the maid's human rights".

The Embassy issued a statement stressing the BBC's editorial independence of the British government, while a spokesman for Tiger Aspect stated that: "Harry & Paul is a post-watershed comedy sketch series and as such tackles many situations in a comedic way. Set in this context, the sketch is so far beyond the realms of reality as to be absurd – and in no way is intended to demean or upset any viewer."

In a 10 October 2008 letter, BBC Director General Mark Thompson formally apologised to Philippine Ambassador to the Court of St James's Edgardo Espiritu: "Please accept my sincere apologies, on behalf of the BBC, for the offence that this programme caused you." Earlier, Chief executive of Harry and Paul producer, Tiger Aspect Productions, Andrew Zane, stated: "We're sorry to anyone who was in any way offended by the programme. This certainly was not our intention." British ambassador to Manila, Peter Beckingham, made a rejoinder: "Our relationship has never been stronger, and the prospects are excellent."

== DVD release ==
- Series 1 was released on DVD by 2entertain on 26 November 2007. No extras were included and music edits are noted on the packaging.
- Series 2 was released on DVD on 27 October 2008.
- Series 3 was released on DVD on 8 November 2010.
- Series 4 was released on DVD on 10 December 2012.
- All the DVDs offer English subtitles.

== International broadcasters ==
Country	Channel
Australia	ABC TV
Canada	Super Channel
Finland	Sub
New Zealand	TV ONE
Poland	HBO Poland
Russia	21+
Indonesia	Kompas TV
