= Don't Quote Me (TV series) =

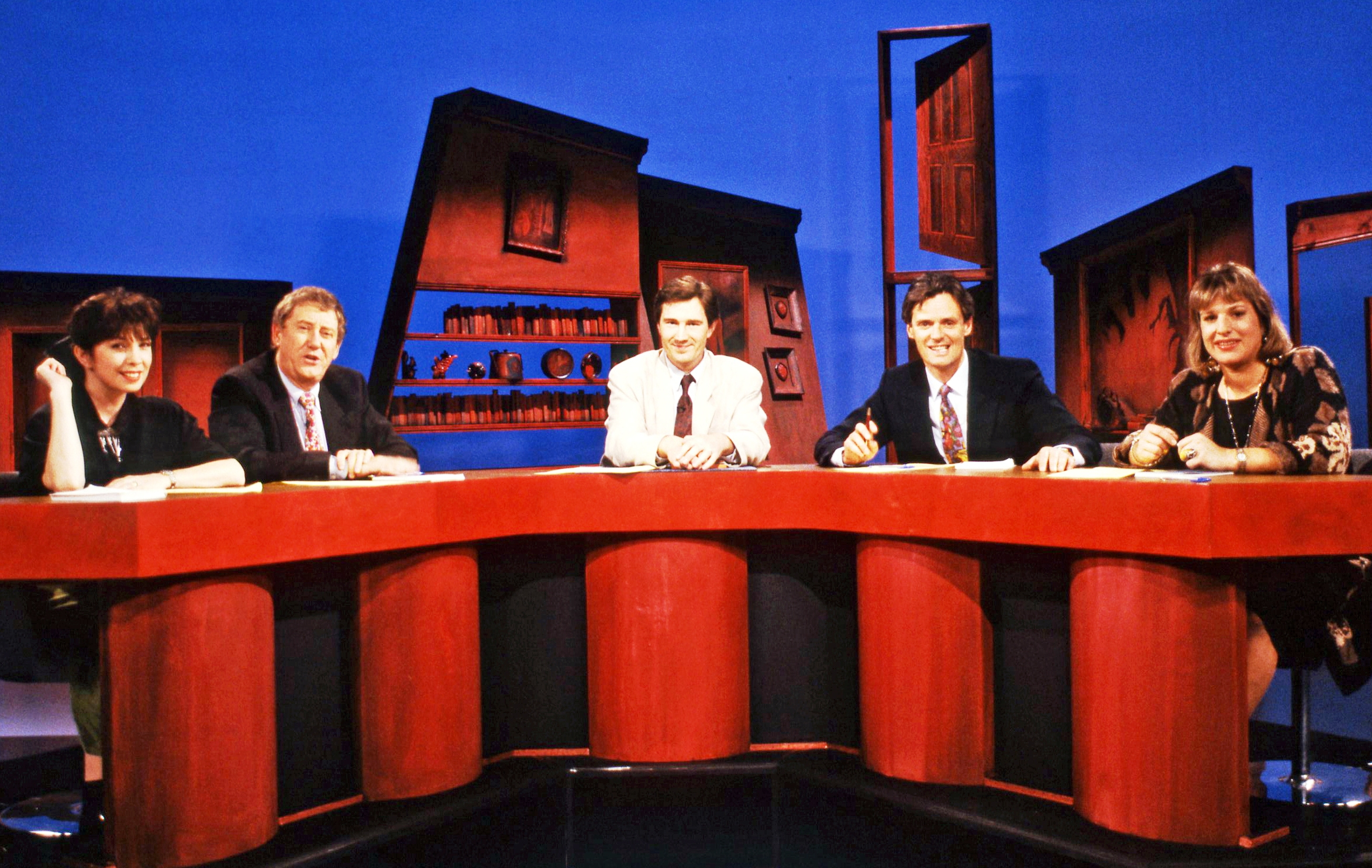
- Geoffrey Perkins with guests including (left to right) Kit Hollerbach, Austin Mitchell, Simon Williams and Carol Thatcher
- Genre: Panel game
- Directed by: Nick Vaughan-Barratt
- Presented by: Geoffrey Perkins
- Country of origin: United Kingdom
- Original language: English
- No. of series: 1
- No. of episodes: 21

Production
- Production company: Open Media

Original release
- Network: Channel 4
- Release: 4 June – 22 October 1990

Don't Quote Me is a television panel game, produced by Open Media and broadcast by Channel 4 in 1990. It was hosted by Geoffrey Perkins, who said "The show exploits foot in mouth quotes. Those things that people have said that perhaps now they wish they hadn't".

== List of episodes ==
Here follows a complete list of all editions, with the names of all the guests and the original broadcast date.

No.	Title	Original release date
1	Simon Napier-Bell, Sandi Toksvig, Austin Mitchell MP, Valerie Singleton	4 June 1990
2	James Burke, Anne Nightingale, Donald Trelford, Jimmy Mulville	11 June 1990
3	Jaci Stephen, Michael Winner, Bob Beckman, Tim Rice	18 June 1990
4	Trevor Phillips, Ned Sherrin, Anna Raeburn, Roy Hattersley MP	25 June 1990
5	Ian Hislop, Jack Tinker, Emma Freud, David Steel MP	2 July 1990
6	Charles Kennedy MP, Jenny Lecoat, Andrew Rawnsley, Ned Sherrin	9 July 1990
7	Simon Hoggart, Heather Couper, Jimmy Mulville, Emma Nicholson MP	16 July 1990
8	Barry Cryer, Emma Freud, Brian Hayes, Sue Arnold	23 July 1990
9	Neil Mullarkey, Trevor McDonald, Polly Toynbee, Simon Williams	30 July 1990
10	Andrew Neil, Linda Agran, Julian Critchley MP, Phil Cornwell	6 August 1990
11	Charles Kennedy MP, Sandi Toksvig, Ann Leslie, Victor Spinetti	13 August 1990
12	Miles Kington, Tony Slattery, Gill Pyrah, Barry Cryer	20 August 1990
13	Jane Walmsley, Clive Anderson, Sheila Steafel, Paul Boateng MP	27 August 1990
14	Charlie Gillett, Harry Enfield, Craig Charles, Tim Rice	3 September 1990
15	Tony Banks MP, Trevor McDonald, Robert Elms, Victor Spinetti	10 September 1990
16	Kit Hollerbach, Austin Mitchell MP, Simon Williams, Carol Thatcher	17 September 1990
17	Jenny Agutter, Rory McGrath, Sally Jones, Roy Hattersley MP	24 September 1990
18	Laurie Taylor, Clive Anderson, Trevor Phillips, George Gale	1 October 1990
19	Brian Sewell, Harry Enfield, Austin Mitchell MP, John Walters	8 October 1990
20	Julian Critchley MP, Tony Slattery, Bryan Forbes, Steve Wright	15 October 1990
21	Roy Jenkins MP, Rory McGrath, Mark Lawson, John Biffen MP	22 October 1990
