= Geoffrey Perkins =

British comedy writer, producer and actor

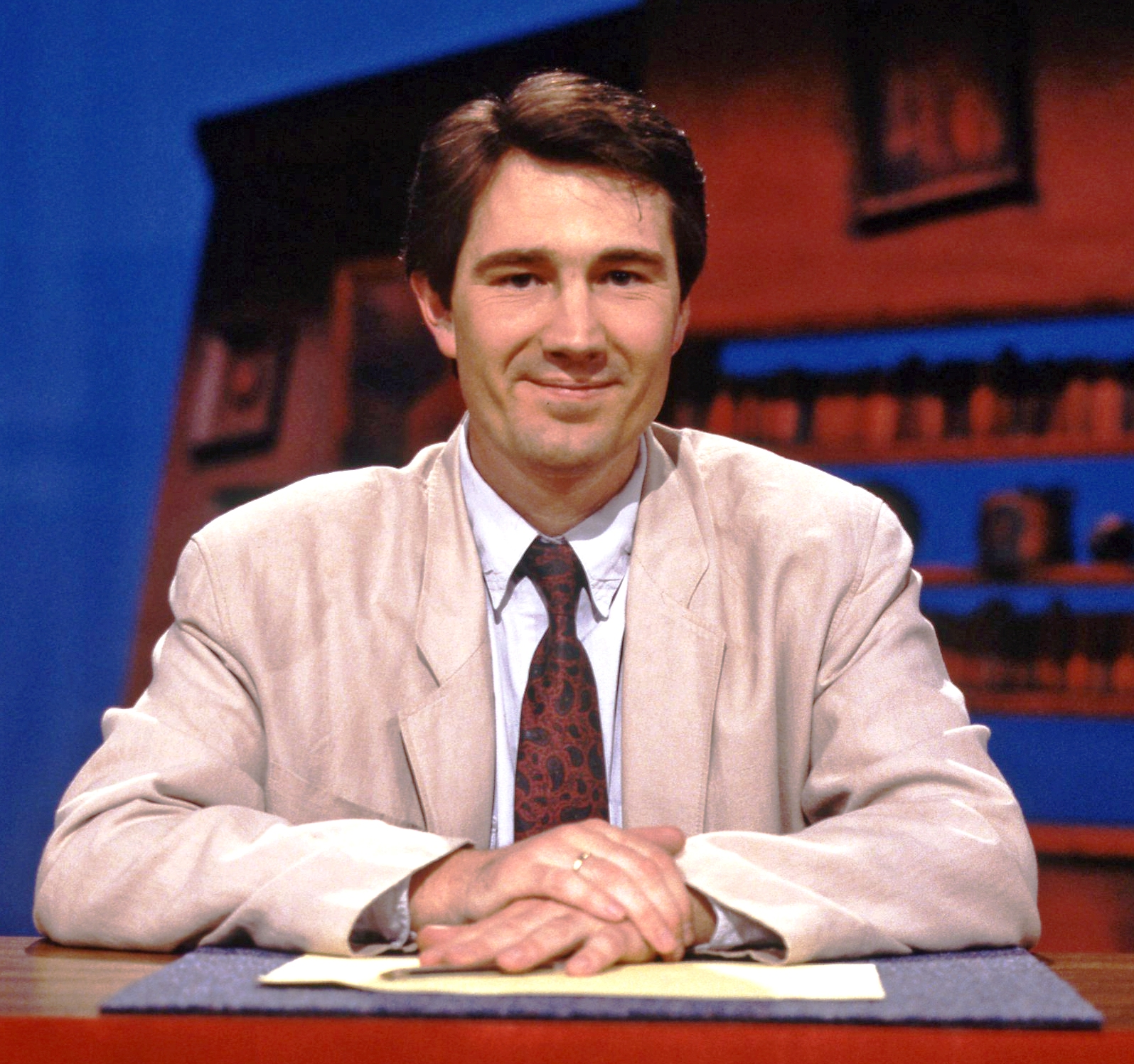
- Geoffrey Perkins hosting Channel 4 panel game Don't Quote Me, 1990
- Born: Geoffrey Howard Perkins; 22 February 1953; Bushey, Hertfordshire, England
- Died: 29 August 2008 (aged 55); London, England
- Occupations: Comedy writer; producer; performer
- Years active: 1972–2008
- Spouse: Lisa Braun (m. 1986)
- Children: 3
- Awards: Best Comedy Programme or Series; 1995 Father Ted

Geoffrey Howard Perkins (22 February 1953 – 29 August 2008) was a British comedy producer, writer and performer. He was BBC head of comedy between 1995 and 2001, and produced the first two radio series of The Hitchhiker's Guide to the Galaxy. He is one of the people credited with creating the panel game Mornington Crescent for I'm Sorry I Haven't a Clue. In December 2008 he posthumously received an Outstanding Contribution to Comedy Award.

== Early life ==
Perkins attended the Harrow County Grammar School, alongside Nigel Sheinwald, Michael Portillo and Clive Anderson, with whom he ran the debating society. He took an early interest in drama in 1970, and he worked with Clive Anderson to write a charity revue called Happy Poison.

Perkins read English literature while at Lincoln College, Oxford and while a student directed and wrote for The Oxford Revues of 1974 and 1975. After his time at Oxford, Perkins joined the Ocean Transport and Trading Company, where he was put to work studying waste timber in Liverpool. He did not last long in the field of commercial shipping. In 1977 drawing upon his work for the Oxford Revue, Perkins joined BBC Radio's light entertainment department alongside Cambridge graduates John Lloyd and Griff Rhys Jones.

In 1986, Perkins married Lisa Braun, who was BBC studio manager on Hitchhiker's Guide. Their first child died to cot death in 1986.

== Radio career ==
Department head David Hatch assigned Perkins to help revitalise the comedy panel show I'm Sorry I Haven't a Clue (launched five years earlier). It introduced the incomprehensible Mornington Crescent game which would become an enduring success.

=== The Hitchhiker's Guide to the Galaxy ===
"The intellectuals compared it to Swift, and the 14-year-olds enjoyed hearing depressed robots clanking around."

— Geoffrey Perkins, on Hitchhiker's Guide to the Galaxy

Perkins produced the first series of Douglas Adams' The Hitchhiker's Guide to the Galaxy in 1977 for BBC Radio 4, taking over from Simon Brett, the producer of the pilot. Perkins assisted the notoriously slow writer in finishing the scripts, before John Lloyd was drafted in to write large sections of the later episodes. Perkins also drew upon the resources of the Radiophonic Workshop to help create the groundbreaking audio effects for the series.

=== Radio Active ===
In 1980, Perkins co-wrote and featured in the radio sketch show Radio Active, revised and adapted from the early Oxford Revue shows, and initially based around the comedy parody group The Hee Bee Gee Bees, consisting of Philip Pope, Angus Deayton and Michael Fenton Stevens. Prior to its leap from the revue to the radio, the production toured and appeared at the Edinburgh Festival Fringe, after which it was picked up by BBC Radio 4 for a pilot called The Oxford Revue Presents Radio Active. Radio Active, "which poked fun at the amateurishness of some local radio broadcasting". It went on to run for seven series and won a Sony Award. Perkins portrayed a character called Mike Flex, a young cocky disc jockey. Perkins and Deayton wrote much of the series and later it was transferred to BBC2 television as the Grand Prix and Silver Rose of Montreux-winner KYTV.

Perkins is credited with writing the joke about Ringo Starr not being the best drummer in the Beatles, frequently misattributed to John Lennon or Jasper Carrott. It was broadcast on Radio Active on 15 September 1981 and spoken by Michael Fenton Stevens.

=== Later radio work ===
Perkins, with Radio Active colleague and co-writer Deayton, later produced The Uncyclopaedia of Rock for Capital Radio, winning the Monaco Radio Award for the show, and penning a 1987 tie-in book with Deayton and Jeremy Pascall. In 2005 Perkins had cameos in the fourth radio series of Hitchhiker's (The Quandary Phase), as the producer of the radio show on which Arthur Dent worked. Perkins essentially played a fictional version of himself from the first series with a fictional version of writer Douglas Adams.

== Television career ==
=== Hat Trick ===
Perkins left the BBC in 1988, to become a director of Hat Trick Productions which is an independent television and radio production company. Hat Trick produced comedy programmes for the BBC, ITV and Channel 4. The first main production of Perkins was Spitting Image where he met Ben Elton, and Harry Enfield whom he got to develop the character of Douglas Hurd by suggesting he adapt it along the lines of Frank Oz's character Fozzie Bear. As a result Perkins developed shows for both performers, Saturday Live, which was hosted by Elton, sketch show The Man from Auntie with Elton, and Enfield's Harry Enfield's Television Programme. Perkins also developed Have I Got News for You, Whose Line Is It Anyway?, Drop The Dead Donkey, and Father Ted for Hat Trick; the shows won many awards including Baftas.

=== BBC Head of Comedy ===
In 1995, he resigned from Hat Trick and returned to the BBC as BBC Television's Head of Comedy, requesting his contract stipulated "his continued role as a programme producer," as well as overseeing the department. He stayed in this role until 2001, growing increasingly dissatisfied at "official BBC snootiness about comedy".

Perkins meticulously read 30 new scripts every week, but "found himself culturally marginalised at the BBC," saying: "Unfortunately, the term sitcom implies a great disdain. People say it with a curl of their lips." Under Director-General John Birt, Perkins also felt "hamstrung by the inevitable bureaucracy," which not only hindered programme-making, but saw Perkins spending "more time on budgets" than more creative pursuits.

Perkins felt that the changes in how the BBC was run,

(They) set the people that produce programmes in direct opposition to the people responsible for actually paying for and broadcasting them. There have been occasions when you say, 'Let's just make a deal', knowing everyone is unhappy; where no one gets the budget they want to make their programme. There are people who are inspired by that, but I'm not one of them.

During Perkins' time as Head of Comedy, the BBC produced such hits including Coupling, The Thin Blue Line, Jonathan Creek, The Fast Show, The Royle Family and My Family. Perkins also persuaded David Jason and Nicholas Lyndhurst to star in a new series of Only Fools and Horses, the first of which was screened at Christmas 2001.

=== Tiger Aspect ===
Having left the BBC, Perkins became a creative director and executive producer for independent production company Tiger Aspect in late 2001. In this role, he was able to pursue a more hands-on role in the "creative side of programme-making." For Tiger Aspect, Perkins produced programmes including The Catherine Tate Show for the BBC, and Benidorm for ITV.

== Television writing and acting credits ==
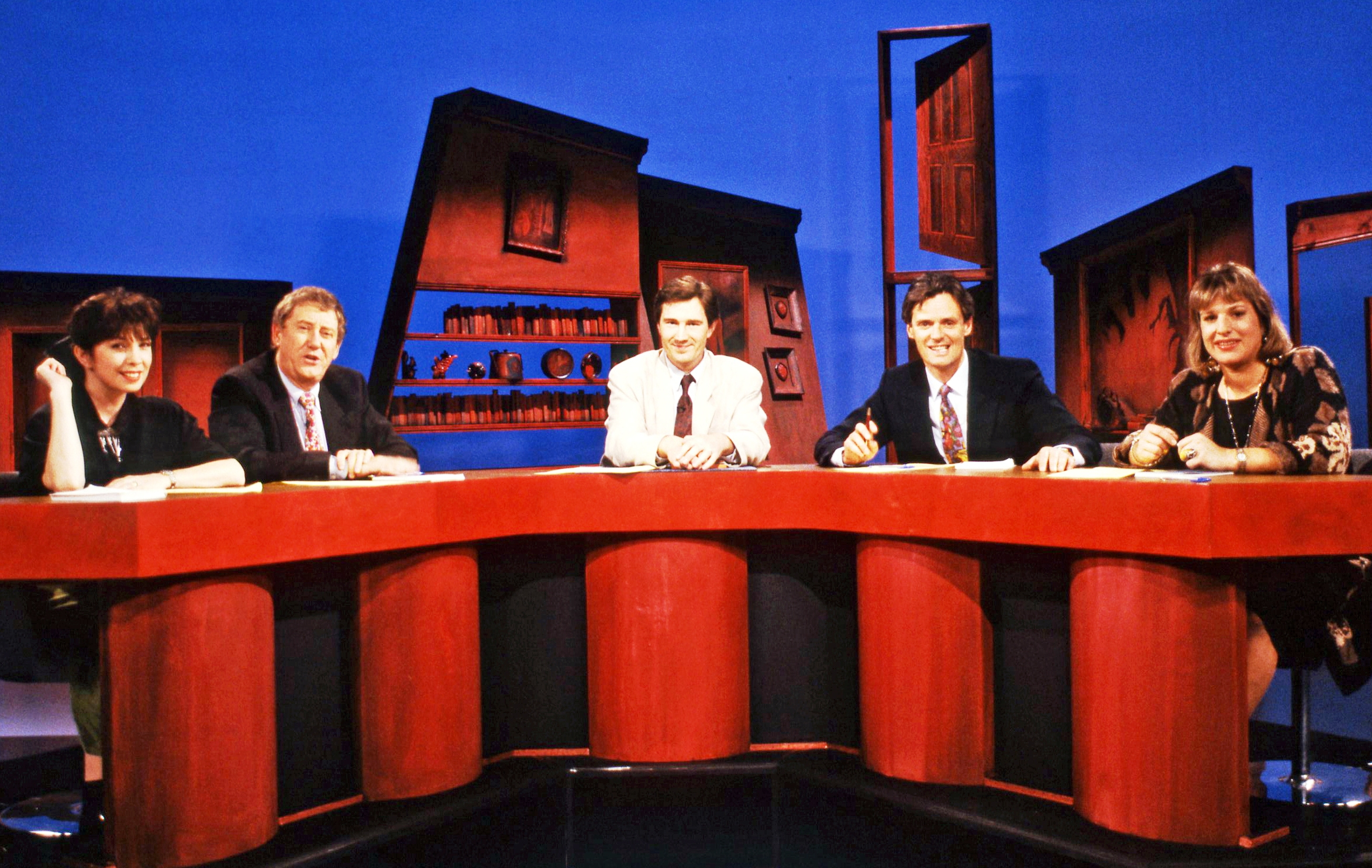
Hosting Don't Quote Me on Channel 4, 1990

Perkins' writing credits for television include The World According To Smith & Jones, KYTV, Harry Enfield's Television Programme, Harry Enfield and Chums and Coogan's Run.

In addition to starring in KYTV, Perkins appeared in small cameo roles in several of the comedy programmes he produced, including Father Ted, Operation Good Guys, One Foot in the Grave and The Catherine Tate Show. He also hosted the panel game Don't Quote Me, made by Open Media for Channel 4 in 1990.

In 2006, Harry Enfield was told by Peter Fincham, the controller of BBC One that he was too old to make another comedy sketch series. Enfield approached Geoffrey Perkins with his ideas, which Perkins helped Enfield develop into the first series of Harry and Paul, starring Enfield and Paul Whitehouse. The series, Ruddy Hell! It's Harry & Paul, was broadcast in April 2007.

== Death and tributes ==
Perkins died on 29 August 2008. It had been initially thought that Perkins died from injuries sustained in an accident involving a lorry in Marylebone High Street, London; however, a coroner's inquest in April 2009 determined that Perkins had suffered from an undiagnosed case of channelopathies, which caused his heart to stop suddenly. The jury decided that Perkins had probably already died when he fell under the wheels of the lorry and as such the coroner recorded that he died from "natural causes".

On 5 September 2008 the second series of the re-titled Harry and Paul was broadcast, a week after his death. The first episode was dedicated to his memory and instead of the usual closing credits, featured a short tribute to him and concluded with an out-take of Perkins forgetting his lines in a sketch absent from the transmitted series. On 8 November 2008, BBC Two aired an evening of programmes in tribute to Perkins, comprising episodes of The Catherine Tate Show, Father Ted (which the BBC was given special permission to broadcast by Channel 4, as part of the tribute) and The Fast Show, together with a special edition of Comedy Connections looking at Perkins' career in comedy.

He was posthumously awarded the Outstanding Contribution to Comedy award at the British Comedy Awards on 6 December 2008. The recipients of both of the BAFTAs awarded on 27 April 2009 to Harry and Paul for Best Comedy Programme and to The IT Crowd for Best Situation Comedy dedicated their awards to Perkins.
