= Entropy (film) =

- Video release poster
- Directed by: Phil Joanou
- Written by: Phil Joanou
- Produced by: Brad Epstein; Phil Joanou; Elie Samaha; Jane Rosenthal; Robert De Niro
- Starring: Stephen Dorff; Judith Godrèche; Kelly Macdonald; Lauren Holly; Jon Tenney; Frank Vincent; Paul Guilfoyle; Hector Elizondo; Bray Poor; Kathryn Erbe; Shannon Fiedler; Zach Tyler; Jim Gaffigan; Dominic Hawksley; Bono Vox
- Cinematography: Carolyn Chen
- Edited by: John Galt
- Music by: George Fenton; Mr. Dan; Andrew Phillpott; Toy
- Production companies: Phoenician Entertainment; Tribeca Productions
- Distributed by: Buena Vista Home Entertainment (through Touchstone Home Video)
- Release dates: April 15, 1999 (Los Angeles Independent Film Festival); September 12, 2000 (United States home video)
- Running time: 104 minutes
- Country: United States
- Language: English

Entropy is a 1999 American drama film directed by Phil Joanou, starring Stephen Dorff and featuring the Irish rock band U2.

== Plot ==
A largely autobiographical film about director Phil Joanou, covering his early film career, his relationships, including a very short-lived marriage.

== Cast ==
- Stephen Dorff as Jake Walsh
- Judith Godrèche as Stella
- Kelly Macdonald as Pia
- Lauren Holly as Claire
- Jon Tenney as Kevin
- Frank Vincent as Sal
- Paul Guilfoyle as Andy
- Hector Elizondo as The Chairman
- Bray Poor as Wyatt
- Kathryn Erbe as Evan
- Shannon Fiedler as Isabelle
- Zach Tyler as Lukas
- Jim Gaffigan as Lucky
- Dominic Hawksley as Pierre
- Drena De Niro as Waitress
- Bono as himself
- Edge as himself
- Larry Mullen Jr. as himself
- Adam Clayton as himself

== Release ==
The film has been re-released as "Adventures in Tinseltown" for streaming and is available on Tubi and Amazon Prime Video.
