= 50 Terrible Predictions =

2005 British television show

- Genre: Clip show
- Written by: Jez Stevenson
- Directed by: Mark McMullen; Gareth Williams
- Presented by: Angus Deayton
- Country of origin: United Kingdom

Production
- Executive producer: Mark Robinson
- Producers: Mark McMullen; Gareth Williams
- Camera setup: Single-camera
- Production company: Granada
- Budget: £400,000

Original release
- Network: Sky One
- Release: 2005

50 Terrible Predictions is a one-off list show that counts down the fifty worst predictions of all time – the prediction that the Millennium Bug would lead to global catastrophes and cause society to cease to function was at number one. The programme was first broadcast on 28 March 2005 on the British channel Sky One, and was presented by the British comedian Angus Deayton.

== Production ==
50 Terrible Predictions was produced by Granada Television for Sky. It was presented by the British comedian Angus Deayton, and was directed by Mark McMullen and Gareth Williams. It was a follow-up to a similar programme, 50 Worst Decisions of All Time, which was also presented by Deayton and was broadcast by Sky in September 2004. Contributors to 50 Terrible Predictions included Carol Vorderman, Noel Sharkey and Jon Tickle, who appear in the show as talking heads. The predictions that the programme discusses include Tony Blair's prediction that Saddam Hussein would have weapons of mass destruction, and David Steel's 1981 prediction that Liberal activists should prepare for government. In a review of 50 Terrible Predictions for The Times, Joe Joseph described David Gest's prediction in 2002 that he and his wife Liza Minnelli would die in each other's arms as the "most risible", given that, within two years of their wedding, Gest and Minnelli were suing each other for divorce.

== Promotion ==
To promote 50 Terrible Predictions, Deayton filmed a series of trailers that Sky aired in the days leading up to the show's first broadcast. Soundtracked by the "Sunrise" section of Also sprach Zarathustra by Richard Strauss, the trailers depict Deayton in bright, white room and dressed in a white suit, as he is attended to by a man in a gorilla costume (a reference to Arthur C. Clarke's 1964 prediction that humans would develop "intelligent and useful servants" from chimps through bioengineering). Deayton lists aspects of life in 2005 that no-one predicted, before listing some incorrect predictions of the future. He invites viewers to watch the show, then ends the trailer by turning to the gorilla and saying: "I think I'll have my Brazilian now."

== Predictions ==
- The Millennium Bug (1999)
- Tony Blair predicts that Saddam Hussein has weapons of mass destruction. (2003)
- Michael Fish predicts that there will not be a hurricane on 16 October 1987. (1987)
- Dick Rowe of Decca Records predicts that "guitar groups are on their way out". (1962)
- Margaret Thatcher predicts that there will not be "a woman prime minister in [her] lifetime". (1973)
- Paul Grein of Billboard predicts that "Madonna will be out of business in six months". (1985)
- The Sinclair C5 (1985)
- Barry Cunningham of Bloomsbury Publishing predicts that J. K. Rowling will "never make any money out of children's books". (1996)
- Alan Hansen predicts that "you can't win anything with kids". (1995)
- The New York Times predicts that "there may be a recession in stock prices, but not anything in the nature of a crash". (1929)
- Nostradamus predicts that "a great and terrifying leader will come out of the sky" in July 1999. (1557–58)
- David Steel tells activists at the Liberal Assembly to "go back to [their] constituencies and prepare for government". (1981)
- Kieran Prendiville of Tomorrow's World predicts that compact discs are indestructible. (1981)
- Ken Irwin of the Daily Mirror predicts that Coronation Street is "doomed from the outset". (1960)
- Jet packs (1960s)
- Edward Makuka Nkoloso predicts that Zambian astronauts will be the first to the moon. (1962)
- Morrissey predicts that the music video market is "something that's going to die very quickly". (1984)
- Kevin Keegan predicts that David Batty will score his penalty against Argentina at the FIFA World Cup. (1998)
- Keegan predicts that only the England football team can win their match against Romania at the FIFA World Cup. (1998)
- Arthur C. Clarke predicts on Horizon that humans will develop "intelligent and useful servants" from chimps through bioengineering. (1964)
- Paula Radcliffe will win at the Athens Olympics. (2004)
- Raymond Baxter of Tomorrow's World predicts that we will eat only pills to provide all the vitamins and nutrients we need. (1966)
- Rodney Marsh predicts that Bradford City A.F.C. will be relegated after the 1999–2000 FA Premier League, and that they can shave his head if they are not. (1999)
- Bubble fusion (2002)
- Jamie Shaw of One True Voice predicts that they will be the "next Beatles". (2003)
- David Gest predicts that he and his wife Liza Minnelli will "die in each other's arms". (2002)
- Paul R. Ehrlich of Stanford University predicts "a one or two per cent chance of civilisation reaching the end of the century". (1971)
- Howard Harrison predicts that Britain will eat Weetabix "three times a day". (1979)

== Reception ==
Reception to 50 Terrible Predictions was generally positive. Writing for The Eye—the arts supplement of The Times—Gabrielle Starkey named the show as one of the paper's "multichannel choices" of the day, and noted how Deayton "wryly smirks" his way through the countdown. Kate Bevan of The Daily Telegraph felt that some of the programme's predictions were "a bit makeweight", but nonetheless described it as "an unmissable show". Karl French of the Financial Times awarded the show three stars out of five, and described it as "all rather good, undemanding fun". A review of a more critical nature came from Tanya Sweeney of the Evening Herald, who felt that the show was "all very predictable" and not "as juicy as it could have been".

== Distribution ==
50 Terrible Predictions was first broadcast on 28 March 2005 on Sky One. Sky repeated the programme on several occasions – after its initial broadcast in 2005, the show was repeated four times over the 2006–07 Christmas period on Sky Two and Sky Three, and was also repeated on Sky One on 28 July 2007. Following the decision by the Hollywood Foreign Press Association not to host a traditional ceremony for the 65th Golden Globe Awards, Sky moved its coverage of the awards to Sky News and replaced its planned Golden Globes show with a repeat of 50 Terrible Predictions.
