= Bruce Hyman =

British radio and TV producer

Bruce Anthony Hyman
- Occupations: Barrister; Radio producer; TV producer
- Status: Released
- Conviction: Perverting the course of justice (2007)
- Criminal charge: Perverting the course of justice
- Penalty: 12 months imprisonment; with a two–month non–parole period
- Comments: Disbarred as a barrister by the Bar Standards Board

Bruce Anthony Hyman is a British lawyer and former radio and TV producer. A barrister by profession, in 2007 Hyman was the first person in his profession in 800 years to be incarcerated for attempting to pervert the course of justice.

== Crime ==
On Monday 6 August 2007 Hyman was convicted of attempting to pervert the course of justice. Hyman had been representing a divorced woman fighting for custody of her four-year-old daughter when he tried to falsely incriminate the girl's father. The father, Simon Eades, was applying for increased access to his child. Hyman had crafted and sent a fraudulent email to the father which appeared to be from a charity campaigning for fathers' rights and whose content appeared to support the father's claim that he should be granted greater access to his daughter. When Eades presented the email in court, Hyman accused him of forgery. Eades' own detective work attempting to clear his name led ultimately to the arrest of Hyman. CCTV footage from a computer shop proved that Hyman had sent the email and thus had attempted to falsely incriminate Eades. On 19 September 2007 Hyman was jailed for 12 months at Bristol Crown Court, and ordered to pay £3,000 compensation to his victim. He was released a few days before Christmas 2007 after serving just over two months of his sentence. In November 2008 Hyman was permanently disbarred by the Bar Standards Board.

At his trial, Hyman, who had committed his crime in the family court, produced a character reference from his friend, Sir Mark Potter, who was the head of the family division of UK justice. A complaint against Sir Mark Potter in this regard was investigated by the Office of Judicial Complaints.

== Work ==
At Above the Title Productions Hyman produced three new radio series of Douglas Adams' The Hitchhiker's Guide to the Galaxy in 2003 and 2004, with Helen Chattwell and Dirk Maggs. He also acted as Executive Producer of the BBC Radio 4 programme presented by Clive Anderson called Unreliable Evidence until 2006. Hyman has written scripts for Johnny Vegas, Angus Deayton and Gordon Brown.
