= Radio Active (radio series) =

British comedy (BBC Radio 4, 1980–87)

- Genre: Sketch show
- Running time: 30 minutes
- Home station: BBC Radio 4
- TV adaptations: KYTV
- Starring: Angus Deayton; Geoffrey Perkins; Michael Fenton Stevens; Helen Atkinson-Wood; Philip Pope
- Written by: Angus Deayton; Geoffrey Perkins; Richard Curtis
- Produced by: Jimmy Mulville; David Tyler
- Original release: 8 April 1980 – 17 October 1987
- No. of series: 7
- No. of episodes: 55

Radio Active is a radio comedy programme, broadcast on BBC Radio 4 during the 1980s. The series grew out of a 1979 Edinburgh Festival Fringe show presented by The Oxford Revue and starred Angus Deayton, Geoffrey Perkins, Michael Fenton Stevens, Helen Atkinson-Wood and Philip Pope. The first episode was broadcast in 1980, and it ran for seven series.

== Programme format ==
The show is based on a fictional radio station (described as "Britain's first national local radio station") and the programmes that it might transmit. Initially the radio station concept was used simply as a loose framing device for otherwise unlinked sketches and songs, but as the show developed, the episodes became more thematically focused, each one lampooning a different broadcasting genre and sometimes even a specific programme such as Down Your Way (parodied as "Round Your Parts"), In at the Deep End ("Out of Your Depth"), Ultra Quiz ("Gigantaquiz"), The Radio Programme ("The Radio Radio Programme") and Crimewatch ("Stop That Crime UK").

The programmes often pitch the "modern-media" regular characters against older stereotypes of foreigners and "establishment types" such as generals and politicians, though the programme rarely strays into the "alternative comedy" vogue of contemporary political comment. However some episodes in the final series made reference to real-life events: "Probe Round the Back" is a parody of investigative journalism which revolved around the Cambridge Five and contains allusions to Spycatcher and the Zircon affair, and "The Flu Special" satirises the then-current HIV/AIDS public awareness campaigns.

In "Bedrock", the fifth episode of the first series, which was written by Perkins, Fenton Stevens' character says: "Alright, maybe Ringo Starr wasn't the best drummer in the world. Alright, maybe he wasn't the best drummer in the Beatles, but he's a name." After comedian Jasper Carrott told the same joke on his BBC One show Carrott Confidential in 1987, it became an urban legend that John Lennon had actually said it during his lifetime.

=== Characters ===
Most of the original characters on the show are named after pieces of sound equipment, including:

- rising star Mike Flex (Perkins),
- aged fading star Mike Channel (Deayton),
- "children's favourite" "Uncle" Mike Stand (Stevens)
- the food-obsessed Anna Daptor (Atkinson-Wood)

Also on the station's staff are:

- the incomprehensible and accident-prone Nigel Pry (Pope)
- the incompetent hospital-radio trained Martin Brown (Stevens)
- the carefully enunciated gag named "oh-so-daring" Mike Hunt (Deayton), whose daredevil stunts invariably turned out not to be as spectacular as he claimed
- brusque station owner Sir Norman Tonsil (Deayton), the name perhaps alluding to Norman Tebbit
- Norwegian correspondent Oivind Vinstra (Perkins), whose command of English was virtually limited to the phrase "and on with the music”. It is heavily implied in the last episode of series seven (‘Mega Phone-In’) that he's not really Norwegian when he doesn't understand a caller who speaks to him in Norwegian, and switches to perfect English (with no accent) when questioned about his legal status in Britain by a member of the Immigration Authority.
- Head of Religious Affairs The Right Reverend Reverend Wright (Deayton), who had a mail-order bride

Other recurring characters include:

- unsympathetic agony aunt Anna Rabies (known as "Joanna Jaundice" in series one, and "Claire Rabies" in series three) (Atkinson-Wood), the names perhaps alluding to Anna Raeburn and Claire Rayner
- singing doctor Philip Percygo (Pope)
- Luscivia, who ran the Radio Active gift shop (Atkinson-Wood)

The second series sees the characters become more defined, with Mike Channel revealed as the station's longest-serving presenter and resentful of the more popular younger hosts, especially Mike Flex, whom Channel frequently complained had taken "his" mid-morning show. At the same time, Nigel Pry gains the idiosyncratic speech patterns and propensity to injury that became his defining traits, and Mike Stand is effectively reinvented as a completely new character, changing from an old-school rock DJ in the first series, to a giggling, infantile children's presenter. Although he would come to be regarded as a main character, Martin Brown is not introduced until series 4, and was originally intended as a one-off character (he is so incompetent that during his first show, the station's other presenters are revealed to be listening in another studio and laying bets on how long it will take for Sir Norman to fire him – which duly happens at the end of the episode) but was so well-received that a brief appearance by the character was added to the final episode of the series, before he was brought back as a regular in the fifth series.

=== Writers ===
Angus Deayton and Geoffrey Perkins wrote most of the material. The first series was credited as written by Deayton, Perkins and Richard Curtis, as it drew on sketches written by Deayton and Curtis for the original stage show. Other significant additional contributions came from, at various times, Jon Canter, Terence Dackombe, Michael Fenton Stevens, Jack (then John) Docherty, Moray Hunter, and in the later series Jeremy Pascall (with whom Deayton and Perkins were concurrently writing The Uncyclopedia of Rock for Capital Radio). The musical elements were provided by Philip Pope. Four producers worked on the series over the years (Jimmy Mulville, Jamie Rix, Paul Mayhew-Archer and David Tyler).

=== Theme tune ===
The series theme tune is "Out To Lunch" by The Client, a 1979 RCA single (PB5214), originally used for a NatWest advert. The Client consisted of Ronnie Bond and Tom Parker.

=== Recurring elements ===
The show had its origins in the University of Oxford student drama community, especially in the musical parodies of Philip Pope, which were regularly featured on Radio Active. The best known of these is the Bee Gees parody The Hee Bee Gee Bees, with their song "Meaningless Songs (In Very High Voices)", which became a moderate 1980 hit.

Pope produced station jingles for phone-in segments, incorporating false endings, as well as commercial introductions. While initial weekly jingles resembled standard radio station identifiers, later productions evolved into elaborate musical pastiches.

The "commercials" feature many parodies of current TV adverts and other running jokes, including conversations between housewives Mary (Fenton Stevens putting on a high-pitched voice) and June (Atkinson-Wood); goods and services of dubious legality offered by "Honest Ron – the others are a con" (Stevens); and "blindingly obvious" patronising public service announcements ("Do not throw boiling water over a child").

Mike Flex presides over the rigged "Master Quiz" with ever-changing rules and format, although the prize remains the same: a chateau in the Loire Valley, which curiously goes un-won from week to week. The Radio Active Drama Repertory Company usually give a performance with wild misreadings of the scripts ("She's seriously one hundred and eleven. (Pause). She's seriously ill.") and miscued sound effects.

Each programme starts and ends with a comical handover to the Radio 4 continuity announcer.

== Transmission ==
The original broadcasts took place on BBC Radio 4 between 1980 and 1987 (as detailed in the table below). One special from the same team (The Hee Bee Gee Bees Story) premiered on BBC Radio 2; uniquely this edition was presented as a straightforward mockumentary, narrated by disc jockey Paul Burnett.

Episodes from the series were repeated on Radio 4 in late 2002, and again on classic comedy radio station BBC 7 in 2003, late 2004, early 2005 and mid-2006 and again in 2007.

A new one-off episode of Radio Active, the first for 15 years, was broadcast on BBC Radio 4 in December 2002.

The third episode of series 7 ("The God Alone Knows Show") caused many complaints on its first transmission and so was edited for the mid-week repeat and all later broadcasts. In particular, in the broadcast church service near the start of the episode, the inability of any of the congregation to recite the Lord's Prayer correctly was replaced with a request for two girls in the front row to turn off their Sony Walkmans. The new translation of the Bible (by "Honest Ron") was also heavily edited; the new Ten Commandments were changed to remove two which were originally of a sexual nature (replaced by "thou shalt not listen to the Beastie Boys" and "thou shalt not support Arsenal"). A description of the cover (which Ron attempts to pass off as a depiction of Mary Magdalene, but is actually a reproduction or re-creation of the famous Tennis Girl poster) was deleted completely. To make up the lost time, the preceding article was lengthened with a few extra lines.

The first episode of series 7 ("It was 20 years ago (Last Tuesday)") has been edited since Operation Yewtree in order to remove all references to Rolf Harris. As a result it loses the main joke, which is that the listener is guided to thinking they are discussing the Sergeant Pepper album, then reveal the record that "stands as a pointer to the 1960s (and lays down to make an attractive ashtray)" is in fact Two Little Boys. It also means that there are points where the end-of-section jingles are played back to back. The edited episode was broadcast on BBC Radio 4 Extra on November 7th 2026.

== Television adaptation ==
The show transferred to TV as KYTV, which produced 19 episodes (a pilot, three series and one Children in Need special) between 1989 and 1993. The TV show was written, produced and performed by largely the same team as had worked on Radio Active.

Some of the Radio Active scripts and/or plot devices originally heard on the radio series were reused for the TV show, though the central setting changed from a local radio station to a satellite television broadcaster, and a number of new features and scenarios which parodied television convention were added. Spoof commercials continued to broadcast, along with parodies of the self-promotions and branding which were a common feature of television stations at this point.

Several key characters from Radio Active transferred to KYTV largely unchanged from their radio incarnations, including Mike Channel, Mike Flex, Anna Daptor and Martin Brown, who formed the central presentation team for KYTV's programmes; other characters including Anna Rabies and the Right Reverend Reverend Wright also transferred across. Phillip Pope's main character in KYTV was as the station's unnamed continuity announcer, although as with the radio series he (and the other regulars) appeared in multiple roles. The station's owner was again played by Deayton, though the character name was changed from Sir Norman Tonsil to Sir Kenneth Yellowhammer for the TV series, to serve as one of the show's thinly veiled references to Sky TV.

== Stage revival ==
In 2014, Angus Deayton appeared on the Radio 4 series The Frequency of Laughter to discuss Radio Active. When asked whether the show would ever be revived, he responded that it would be "awkward" without Geoffrey Perkins (who died in 2008) but "never say never". After seeing Neil Pearson's production of The Missing Hancocks at the Edinburgh Festival Fringe in 2015, Deayton felt that Radio Active could be revived in the same manner, with the stage show presented as a mock radio recording. The surviving original cast members subsequently appeared at the Fringe in August 2016 in a show using two radio scripts, "David Chizzlenut" and "Did You Catch It?". The "David Chizzlenut" section, recorded at the Fringe, was also broadcast as a one-off special on Radio 4.

The Radio Active team performed the same two episodes on a UK tour in 2019, with extra material added.

== Episode list ==
Series	Episode	Title	First broadcast
Pilot	1	The Oxford Revue presents Radio Active	8 April 1980
1	1	"The Late Show" (aka "Late Night Radio")	8 September 1981
1	2	"Bedrock" (Mike Flex Breakfast Show)	15 September 1981
1	3	"Midday Show" (with Anna Dapter)	22 September 1981
1	4	"Radio Active Roadshow"	29 September 1981
1	5	"What's News?"	6 October 1981
1	6	"Radio Active Awards"	13 October 1981
Special	1	The Hee Bee Gee Bees Story	19 December 1981
2	1	"The History of Radio Active"	16 August 1982
2	2	"Radiothon"	23 August 1982
2	3	"Good Day Sport"	30 August 1982
2	4	"What's Going On?"	6 September 1982
2	5	"The Nigel Pry Show"	13 September 1982
2	6	"Pick of the Week"	20 September 1982
3	1	"Euroshow"	12 July 1983
3	2	"Probe Round the Back" (Behind the scenes)	19 July 1983
3	3	"Radio Active's Funday in Blackport"	26 July 1983
3	4	"Repeat After Three" (Late Show)	2 August 1983
3	5	"Lunchtime with Anna" (Buy British Exhibition)	9 August 1983
3	6	"Edinburgh Festival" (What's Going On?)	16 August 1983
Special	2	"Radio Active's Christmas Turkey"	20 December 1983
4	1	"Salute to New York"	9 July 1984
4	2	"The Martin Brown Show"	16 July 1984
4	3	"Round Your Parts" (in Humpingham)	23 July 1984
4	4	"Radiovision Breakfast Show"	30 July 1984
4	5	"Minorities Programme"	6 August 1984
4	6	"The Bio Show" (Sir John Leslie)	13 August 1984
4	7	"Gigantaquiz"	20 August 1984
4	8	"David Chizzlenut"	27 August 1984
5	1	"Wimbledon Special"	5 July 1985
5	2	"Nuclear Debate"	12 July 1985
5	3	"Out of Your Depth"	19 July 1985
5	4	"Big Down Under Show" (Australia)	26 July 1985
5	5	"Get Away with You"	2 August 1985
5	6	"Wey Hey, It's Saturday"	9 August 1985
5	7	"Music Festival"	16 August 1985
5	8	"Did You Catch It?"	23 August 1985
6	1	"Thodding By-Election"	11 October 1986
6	2	"The Fit and Fat Show"	18 October 1986
6	3	"Bogey Awards"	25 October 1986
6	4	"The D Day Show"	1 November 1986
6	5	"The Nice Film Festival" (aka "Radio Active Goes to the Movies")	8 November 1986
6	6	"Stop That Crime UK"	15 November 1986
6	7	"In-House Documentary"	22 November 1986
6	8	"Backchat"	29 November 1986
7	1	"It Was Twenty Years Ago (Last Tuesday)"	29 August 1987
7	2	"Radio Radio Programme"	5 September 1987
7	3	"God Alone Knows"	12 September 1987
7	4	"Probe Round the Back" (Spycatcher)	19 September 1987
7	5	"Here's a Bit of Talent"	26 September 1987
7	6	"The Flu Special"	3 October 1987
7	7	"You and Your Things"	10 October 1987
7	8	"Mega Phone-In"	17 October 1987
Special	3	"Digital Turn-On"	17 December 2002
Special	4	"David Chizzlenut"	22 September 2016

== Commercial releases ==
An LP of sketches from the second and third series was released by BBC Records in 1983, with a cassette featuring the episodes "David Chizzlenut" and "Mega Phone-In" following in 1993 as part of the BBC Canned Laughter range. A CD of the first series was released in 2010 on the BBC Classic Radio Comedy label, with some minor music edits to "The Midday Show with Anna Daptor". A tie-in book, Radio Active Times, was published in 1986 by Sphere Books. Later that same year, some Radio Active content was featured in The Utterly Utterly Merry Comic Relief Christmas Book. Some of the show's musical parodies were released as singles and albums under the Hee Bee Gee Bees name.
