= Philip Pope =

British actor and composer

- Education: New College, Oxford
- Occupations: Composer, actor
- Notable work: Only Fools and Horses (1991)

Philip R. J. Pope is a British composer and actor.

== Education ==
He was born on August 11, 1956.

He was educated at Downside School and New College, Oxford.

== Performer ==
Pope appeared in the Oxford Revue in Edinburgh Festival Fringe in 1978 and 1979, both with Angus Deayton. He performed in the BBC Radio 4 comedy series Radio Active (1980–1987), alongside Helen Atkinson-Wood, Angus Deayton, Geoffrey Perkins and Michael Fenton Stevens, which later led to the television series KYTV. Fenton Stevens is credited with telling the joke (written by Perkins) about Ringo Starr not being the best drummer in the Beatles, frequently misattributed to John Lennon or Jasper Carrott. It was broadcast on Radio Active on 15 September 1981. Though Beatles biographer Mark Lewisohn initially claimed that it was Pope who said the line, Fenton Stevens later clarified that it was actually him. He also told Beatles fan Andrew Dixon that the cast initially thought it was a real joke that the Fab Four had told themselves.

He has also starred in a number of television comedy series, including Who Dares Wins (1983–1988), Chelmsford 123 (1988–1990), Round the Bend (1989–1991) and KYTV (1989–1993). He made guest appearances in Blackadder as the painter Leonardo Acropolis and Horatio Nelson, and in Shelley as pop star Hobo. Pope also appeared as Tony Angelino, the singing dustman, in the Only Fools and Horses episode "Stage Fright", in 1991.

Pope toured the UK as a member of the cast of The Hitchhiker's Guide to the Galaxy Radio Series Live, for which he was also musical director. Pope portrayed several minor parts in the original radio series, as well as the subsequent adaptations of the later novels.

Pope appeared in the radio series Old Harry's Game (1995–2009), and he has performed as a singer with the Thame Chamber Choir.

== Composer ==
With Richard Curtis, Pope co-wrote the Hee Bee Gee Bees' single "Meaningless Songs" (the B-side of which was "Posing in the Moonlight"), released in 1980 to parody the style of a series of disco hits by The Bee Gees. The Hee Bee Gee Bees went on to record two albums spoofing numerous acts including Eagles, Michael Jackson, The Police, Status Quo and Supertramp. Pope also wrote or co-wrote many comic songs for Not the Nine O'Clock News and Spitting Image, the latter of which included the British Number 1 hit single "The Chicken Song", for which Rob Grant and Doug Naylor wrote the lyrics. Along with Simon Franglen, Pope wrote the main theme for Round the Bend, a three-series children's comedy produced by Yorkshire Television for CITV, and later shown on Channel 4 and Nickelodeon.

Pope has also composed a large amount of music for radio and television, including the theme tunes for Through the Keyhole, Whose Line Is It Anyway?, KYTV, My Hero and Ruddy Hell! It's Harry and Paul. He was the musical director and composer for The Fast Show, as well as the popular BBC children's programmes Words and Pictures, Fimbles and The Roly Mo Show. Pope also provided the voice for the characters of Yugo and Migo from The Roly Mo Show.

Pope has scored numerous dramas and comedy-dramas for television, including Ted & Ralph, Midnight Flight, Crazy for A Kiss, Hospital! and Margery & Gladys as well as the film Kevin & Perry Go Large (2000).

He was invited to arrange Snow Patrol's "Run 12" remixed by Jacknife Lee, to which he contributed additional guitar.

On 5 October 2004, Pope featured in an episode of the radio series The Hitchhiker's Guide to the Galaxy, entitled "Fit the Fifteenth", as one of three aliens from the planet of Krikkit. They sang a song called "Under the Ink Black Sky", which Pope wrote and performed.

On 13 February 2013, Pope and his wife Rosie appeared on ITV's From The Heart, a programme about organ donation and which featured their 20-year-old son Will, who was seriously unwell with a failing heart, had only months to live, and was in desperate need of heart transplantation. He finally obtained a new heart in a successful operation, and was slowly nursed back to health by his family.

In 2002, Pope and Jules de Jongh did stage productions with Iain Lauchlan at Imagine Theatre in Coventry.

In 2007, Pope composed the music for the radio adaptations of Dirk Gently's Holistic Detective Agency and its sequel, The Long Dark Tea-Time of the Soul.

In 2014, Pope appeared in The Life of Rock with Brian Pern as Mike Philips.
