= Dominic Hawksley =

British actor

Dominic Hawksley is a British actor who appeared in Death Machine (1994) and Entropy (1999). His voice work includes Midnight Club: Street Racing (2000), Midnight Club II (2003), and Max Payne (2001) wherein he appears in the first game as the mob leader Vladimir Lem. and in the documentary film The Endurance: Shackleton's Legendary Antarctic Expedition (2000). He has also featured in numerous radio dramas and comedies for BBC Radio 4 including The Hitchhiker's Guide to the Galaxy, The Glittering Prizes and Life of Penguins.

== Filmography ==
| Year | Title | Role | Notes |
|---|---|---|---|
| 1987 | The Secret Garden | Young Soldier | TV movie |
| 1989 | The Bill | Mr. Clifford | Episode: Steamers |
| 1989 | Club X | Actor | Episode: Buygones |
| 1990 | Women and Men: Stories of Seduction | First Young Man | TV movie |
| 1994 | Death Machine | Argumentative Executive | |
| 1999 | Entropy | Pierre | |
