= Helen Atkinson-Wood =

English actress and comedian

Helen Atkinson-Wood (born 14 March 1955) is an English actress and comedian born in Cheadle Hulme, Cheshire.

== Early life ==
Atkinson-Wood attended Beech Lane Primary School in Macclesfield, which closed in 1967. She is a former head girl of Macclesfield County High School for Girls. She grew up in Tytherington, Cheshire and has twin brothers Christopher and Peter.

She has been a rider for many years; aged 16, she fell off her pony and was unconscious for three days. It took two terms at school to learn to read and talk, and it affected her memory. Before moving to London, she lived in Siddington, Cheshire, near Congleton.

Atkinson-Wood studied fine art at the Ruskin School, Oxford University, where she performed with Rowan Atkinson (no relation). She also performed at the Edinburgh Festival Fringe, where she met Ben Elton. Whilst at Oxford, she took part in an OUDS production of Richard II. Also in this production was Tim McInnerny, who played the lead. She later appeared together with McInnerny in an episode of Blackadder the Third.

== Career ==
Atkinson-Wood was a regular presenter of Central Television's short-lived O.T.T. and had a small role in the 1984 Young Ones episode "Nasty". She appeared as Mrs Miggins in Blackadder the Third.

She was the only regular female cast member on the radio comedy programme Radio Active, where she played Anna Daptor and other roles, and also participated in the programme's televisual equivalent, KYTV. She also appeared in the final episode of Joking Apart as a morning television presenter. In 2007, she guest-starred in the Doctor Who audio play I.D.. She played the role of Sybil Ramkin in a BBC radio adaptation of Guards! Guards! by Terry Pratchett.

Atkinson-Wood was a regular presenter for the Channel 4 series Collector's Lot and made guest appearances on programmes such as Call My Bluff. She was a guest in episode 9 of the C series of QI, when she answered a question deemed almost impossible by host Stephen Fry by correctly naming a chemical reaction equation as an explosion of custard powder, earning 200 points. This was because, she claimed, she had studied domestic science at school. Through answering this single question, she held the highest cumulative total of any QI panellist at the time (this is no longer the case - for example, in the K Series episode "Knowledge", Alan Davies scored 689.66 points).

== Personal life ==
While at grammar school in Macclesfield, Atkinson-Wood was friends with Ian Curtis.

At Oxford University she dated Angus Deayton. While touring with the Hee Bee Gee Bees in Australia in the 1980s, Deayton saved Atkinson-Wood's life when he rescued her after she was caught in a rip current while swimming off Sydney's Manly Beach.

Craig Ferguson wrote in his book American on Purpose that he and Atkinson-Wood were in a romantic relationship that lasted five years. He acknowledges that she changed his life "beyond recognition" by improving his health and his career. She left him because of his alcoholism, saying, "I love you, but I won't watch you kill yourself."

She married the writer and director John Morton in 1997, first meeting after she rang to tell him how much she liked his radio comedy People Like Us and he replied, "Thanks a lot. Fancy getting married?"

== Selected performances ==
=== Movie and television ===
- Mrs. Miggins, Blackadder the Third, 6 episodes
- The Young Ones, 1 episode

=== Theatre ===
- Beatrice Voysey in The Voysey Inheritance by Harley Granville Barker. Directed by Greg Hersov at the Royal Exchange, Manchester. (1989)
- Agatha Posket in The Magistrate by Arthur Wing Pinero. Directed by Hersov at the Royal Exchange, Manchester. (2001)
- Polina in The Seagull by Anton Chekov. Directed by Hersov at the Royal Exchange, Manchester. (2003)
- Fritz in Cold Meat Party by Brad Fraser. World premiere directed by Braham Murray at the Royal Exchange, Manchester. (2003)
- Frosine in The Miser by Moliere. Directed by Helena Kaut-Howson at the Royal Exchange, Manchester. (2009)
