= The Hee Bee Gee Bees =

Comedy parody pop band

The Hee Bee Gee Bees was a fictitious pop group which parodied pop groups and performers in the early 1980s, consisting of Angus Deayton, Michael Fenton Stevens, and Philip Pope of the UK radio series Radio Active.

Their first single was "Meaningless Songs (in Very High Voices)" by the Hee Bee Gee Bees, a parody of the Bee Gees. The 'band' consisted of the three Cribb (Gibb) brothers; Garry (Barry), Norris (Maurice) and Dobbin (Robin), performed respectively by Deayton, Fenton Stevens, and Pope. It was written by Pope and Richard Curtis, was released by Original Records in 1980, reached number two in the Australian singles chart and made an appearance on the UK Indie Charts.

Two albums were subsequently released under the Hee Bee Gee Bees name, featuring parodies of pop groups which had originally been featured on Radio Active. Tracks included spoofs of Supertramp ("Scatological Song" by Supertrash), Michael Jackson ("Up the Wall" by Jack Michaelson), Status Quo ("Boring Song" by Status Quid), The Police ("Too Depressed to Commit Suicide" by The PeeCees), David Bowie ("Quite Ahead of My Time" by David Bowwow), Gary Numan ("Are Trains Electric?" by Gary Inhuman) and others. The first album was recorded in the Strawberry Studios in Stockport, and featured 10cc and Sad Café studio musicians. The second album was recorded in and mixed at Silo Studios in London, with Les Davidson (guitar) Steve Shone (bass) and Dave Early (drums). The music was written by Pope, with lyrics by Deayton and other Radio Active scriptwriters.

Fenton Stevens and Pope later collaborated on the Spitting Image parody track "The Chicken Song", which reached number 1 in the UK in 1986.

== Discography ==
=== Albums ===
List of albums, with selected chart positions
| Title | Album details | Peak chart positions |
| Title | Album details | AUS |
|---|---|---|
| 439 Golden Greats, or Never Mind the Originals Here's the Hee Bee Gee Bees | Released: 1981; Format: LP; Label: Original (POW 6022) | 23 |
| 20 Big No. 2's | Released: 1984; Format: LP; Label: J&B (JB 197) | 50 |

=== Singles ===
List of singles, with selected chart positions
| Year | Title | Peak chart positions | |
| Year | Title | AUS | UK Indie |
|---|---|---|---|
| 1981 | "Meaningless Songs" / "Posing in the Moonlight" | 79 | 21 |
| 1981 | "Too Depressed to Commit Suicide" / "Up the Wall" | - | - |
| 1981 | "Boring Song"/ "Dead Cicada" | - | - |
| 1984 | "Purple Pants" / "When Two Songs (Sound the Same)" | - | - |
