= KYTV (TV series) =

British television series

- Genre: Comedy
- Written by: Angus Deayton; Geoffrey Perkins
- Directed by: John Kilby; John Stroud
- Starring: Helen Atkinson-Wood; Angus Deayton; Michael Fenton Stevens; Geoffrey Perkins; Philip Pope
- Country of origin: United Kingdom
- Original language: English
- No. of series: 3
- No. of episodes: 19

Original release
- Network: BBC2
- Release: 12 May 1989 – 22 October 1993

KYTV is a British television comedy series about a fictional television station. It ran on BBC2 from 1989 to 1993, and satirised satellite television in the UK at the time.

== History ==
The show was in effect the television version of Radio Active, which spoofed local radio stations, and was developed by the same team.

It was written by Angus Deayton and Geoffrey Perkins, produced by Jamie Rix, directed by John Kilby and John Stroud, with music by Philip Pope. The majority of the programme's scripts had already aired on Radio Active.

The five key actors all performed various roles, some multiple, others on a single occasion. Their main characters as presenters were:

- Angus Deayton as Mike Channel
- Helen Atkinson-Wood as Anna Daptor
- Michael Fenton Stevens as Martin Brown
- Geoffrey Perkins as Mike Flex
- Philip Pope simply as The Continuity Announcer (not named)

The pilot episode was broadcast on 12 May 1989, and a series of six programmes began on 3 May 1990. A second series of six began on 17 March 1992, and a final six episodes were broadcast between 17 September and 22 October 1993, plus an additional Children in Need special, making a total of 19 episodes.

In 1992, the series won the Silver Rose and the Special Prize of the City of Montreux at the Festival Rose d'Or for the episode "Good Morning Calais". In the DVD commentary for The Micallef Programme, lead writer and performer Shaun Micallef cites the series as an inspiration for his series' format.

== Format ==
KYTV combined irreverent sketches and variety elements (such as song-and-dance routines) with a broad-based satire of the public perception of UK satellite television – that of opportunistic entrepreneurs producing cheap, low-quality television in order to exploit viewers.

KYTV was a fictional low-budget satellite television station named after its owner Sir Kenneth Yellowhammer, and bore a suspicious similarity to Sky Television.

Parody of the launch identification used by Carlton Television

In the second series, KYTV merged with the fictional 'BSE Television', just as Sky merged with BSB. The channel's new name was also KYTV, composed from the first two letters of KYTV and the last two from BSETV. This is similar to BSkyB, composed from the three letters of BSB and the remainder from Sky. The third series featured parodies of the early idents and logo used by Carlton Television.

Each episode featured a central theme (for example, a terrorist siege, the Channel Tunnel, or a costume drama) around which sketches could revolve.

Comedic elements included:

- malfunctioning equipment;
- rolling news channels with little content or analysis;
- sensationalist and dumbed down shows (Murder. Gruesome, bloody murder. Coming right up, after the break. Tell your neighbours);
- underpaid, incompetent and amateurish staff;
- lavish 'showcase sequences' compared to shoddy, makeshift visuals or unfinished sets;
- endless repeats of imported or old (and therefore cheap) programmes as an attempt to fill yawning gulfs of airtime;
- relentless commercial intrusions, including plugs for shopping channels ('By the way, Mike, that's a very smart tie you have on!' 'Yes, and it's only £18.99 at Sofa Shop!')

A regular feature was "Mike Flex's Master Quiz", in which contestants typically had to answer one question correctly to win 'a château in the Loire'. Flex always managed to arrange the questions in such a way that nobody's answer was ever quite right. ("Name That Tune": 'Beatles, Yellow Submarine!' 'Sorry, it was The Beatles, "Yellow Submarine". Bad luck.')

== Episodes ==
=== Pilot ===
"Siege Side Special" (12 May 1989)

=== Series 1 ===
1. "Launch" (3 May 1990)
2. "Big Fight Special" (10 May 1990)
3. "The Green Green Show" (17 May 1990)
4. "Those Wonderful War Years" (24 May 1990)
5. "It's A Royal Wedding" (31 May 1990)
6. "Challenge Anna" (7 June 1990)

Series 1 was released on DVD in October 2006.

=== Series 2 ===
1. "KY Tellython" (17 March 1992)
2. "God Alone Knows" (24 March 1992)
3. "Good Morning Calais" (31 March 1992)
4. "Crisis Special" (7 April 1992)
5. "Speak For Yourself" (14 April 1992)
6. "Talking Head" (21 April 1992)

Series 2 was released on DVD in October 2006.

=== Series 3 ===
1. "The Making of David Chizzlenut" (17 September 1993)
2. "Those Sexciting Sixties" (24 September 1993)
3. "Fly on the Walls" (1 October 1993)
4. "2000 and Whither?" (8 October 1993)
5. "Hot Crimes" (15 October 1993)
6. "Get Away With You" (22 October 1993)

Series 3 remains commercially unavailable following the cancellation of a DVD release scheduled for January 2007.
