= Angus Deayton =

English actor, comedian, presenter and writer (born 1956)

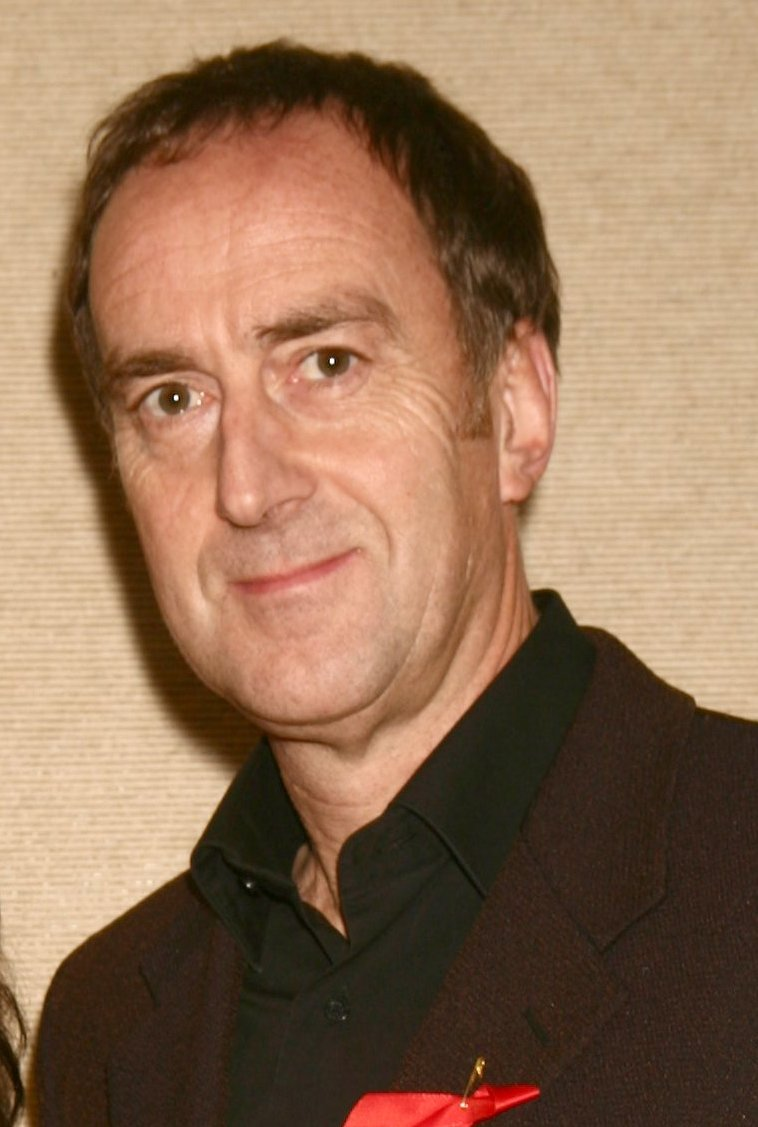
- Deayton in 2007
- Born: Gordon Angus Deayton; 6 January 1956 (age 70); Banstead, Surrey, England
- Education: New College, Oxford (BA)
- Occupations: Actor; comedian; presenter; writer
- Years active: 1980–present
- Known for: Television; stand-up
- Style: Political satire; character comedy
- Television: Have I Got News for You (1990–2002); One Foot in the Grave (1990–2000); Mr. Bean (1991); Would I Lie to You? (2007–2008); Pramface (2012–2014); Waterloo Road (2013–2015)
- Partner(s): Helen Atkinson-Wood; Stephanie De Sykes; Lise Mayer (1991–2015)
- Children: 1

Gordon Angus Deayton (/ˈdiːtən/; born 6 January 1956) is an English actor, comedian and writer.

Deayton was the original presenter of two successful British comedy panel shows, Have I Got News for You (1990–2002) and Would I Lie to You? (2007–2008). He also played Patrick Trench in the sitcom One Foot in the Grave (1990–2000) and George Windsor in the drama series Waterloo Road (2013–2015).

== Early life ==
Deayton was the youngest of three sons of a Prudential insurance broker/manager English father and a home economics school teacher Scottish mother. He was brought up in Banstead, Surrey and attended Oakhurst Grange School before going to Caterham. He showed early promise as a footballer and had a trial with Crystal Palace. He was captain of the Caterham U16 Rugby team.

After Caterham, Deayton went on to read French and German at New College, Oxford and in 1978, he was recruited into the Oxford Revue, performing with them at the Edinburgh Festival Fringe. This led to the creation of the parody band the Hee Bee Gee Bees in 1980, with the songs written by Richard Curtis and Philip Pope. Their best-selling single "Meaningless Songs (In Very High Voices)" (plus the B-side "Posing in the Moonlight") was a parody of the falsetto style of disco hits by the Bee Gees.

== Radio and television career ==
Deayton began his career on Radio Active, a parody of British local radio stations broadcast on BBC Radio 4 between 1981 and 1987, which he co-wrote and performed. It transferred to television as KYTV between 1989 and 1993. Deayton presented a tribute to Radio Active and KYTV colleague and friend (and long-time BBC producer) Geoffrey Perkins for BBC Radio 4 on 4 October 2008.

Deayton was frequently a straight man alongside Rowan Atkinson. He starred with Atkinson as a pool attendant and a man on a park bench in the Mr. Bean episode "The Curse of Mr. Bean" and appeared opposite Atkinson in the Black Adder episode "Born to Be King" (1983) as one of the Jumping Jews of Jerusalem.

From 1988 to 1991, Deayton was a featured player in all three series of the Emmy award-winning sketch comedy programme Alexei Sayle's Stuff. In 1990, Deayton was cast as the Meldrews' neighbour Patrick Trench in the British suburban sitcom One Foot in the Grave and was selected as host of Have I Got News for You. The same year, he featured on television advertising the Vauxhall Nova. André Ptaszynski tried to persuade him to take the lead role in Steven Moffat's sitcom Chalk, a role eventually taken by David Bamber. Deayton worked with David Renwick again appearing in the miniseries If You See God, Tell Him.

In an episode of Coupling, he appears in a fantasy sequence with Mariella Frostrup. He hosted the late-1990s BBC show Before They Were Famous, which showed early and frequently embarrassing clips of TV and film stars (including Deayton himself) when they were relatively unknown. He was much in demand as a presenter of television specials including the BBC's New Year's Eve show and the BAFTA Awards. He also featured in a series of advertisements for Barclaycard and the films Savage Hearts and Elizabeth.

=== Have I Got News for You ===
Deayton's suave manner as host of Have I Got News for You led to his being nicknamed "TV's Mr Sex", by a Time Out listings writer.

In May 2002, the British tabloid newspaper the News of the World reported he had taken cocaine and had sex with prostitutes. He was ridiculed by Paul Merton and Ian Hislop in the following episode of Have I Got News for You but continued as presenter. Deayton began the episode with: "Good evening and welcome to Have I Got News for You, where this week's loser is presenting it." He added later, "There is, by the way, no need to adjust your set, my face is this red."

Following more allegations in October, Deayton was dismissed after two episodes of the new series. One online poll, on the BBC's own website, showed over three-quarters of respondents wanted Deayton to stay on as the programme's host. In April 2003, Stephen Fry supported Deayton by refusing to appear on the show again.

Responding to Merton's "I didn't stab him in the back, I stabbed him in the front" line regarding the episode, in 2016 Deayton said: "Yes, I've heard this and [his comment] is a way of not answering the question. But it's such a tangled web to describe what happened. And Merton and Hislop probably don't know what was happening in the background."

=== Subsequent career ===
Following the end of his stint on Have I Got News for You, Deayton's work included a reunion of the Radio Active cast in a new episode in December 2002. In 2003, he guest-starred as Downing Street's spin doctor in an episode of the BBC comedy Absolute Power, starring Stephen Fry and John Bird. In January 2004, he starred in the BBC comedy Nighty Night. Deayton had a cameo role as a hotel receptionist in the 2004 film Fat Slags. A few months later, he presented the quiz Bognor or Bust. In January 2006, he hosted an ITV show based upon self-help videos called Help Your Self.

Deayton is associated with Comic Relief/Sport Relief and featured in its broadcasts. He co-presented the Sport Relief charity programme Only Fools on Horses in July 2006. Deayton appeared for the England team as a second-half substitute in the Soccer Aid match in support of UNICEF on 27 May 2006. He returned as a starting player for England in a 7 September 2008 rematch.

In 2007, he was in Casualty, playing an exaggerated version of himself in a Comic Relief-related story. In June 2007, Deayton returned to the BBC to host panel show, Would I Lie to You?. In November 2007, he was censured by the BBC for making a "pungently personal" joke about Jimmy Savile and his mother on the show, during which team captain Lee Mack told Deayton that he thought the jokes were "well out of order". He also hosted the second series in 2008, before being replaced by Rob Brydon. On 3 September 2007, Deayton hosted the third series of Hell's Kitchen, but was dismissed in 2009 following arguments with chef Marco Pierre White and was replaced by Claudia Winkleman.

In 2008, Deayton also presented Comedy Sketchbook, a nostalgic look at classic comedy sketches, on BBC1. On 6 December 2008, he presented the 2008 British Comedy Awards, after host Jonathan Ross stepped down because of controversy surrounding The Russell Brand Show prank calls row.

His feature film appearances include the mysterious, all-knowing man in That Deadwood Feeling (2009, co-starring Jack Davenport, Dexter Fletcher and David Soul), Swinging with the Finkels (2011, written and directed by Jonathan Newman, with Mandy Moore and Martin Freeman), and Playing the Moldovans at Tennis (2012). He returned to BBC Radio 4 in 2011 to host the panel show It's Your Round.

On 12 December 2012, Deayton joined the BBC drama series Waterloo Road as a cynical teacher and for a further series as deputy head, George Windsor. He made his first appearance in episode 27 of the eighth series in 2013. In December 2012, he appeared on the BBC Two programme World's Most Dangerous Roads, in which he and Mariella Frostrup were filmed driving along the east coast of Madagascar. He co-starred with Anna Chancellor in the BBC sitcom Pramface (2013).

In August 2016, at the Edinburgh Festival Fringe, Deayton wrote and performed in a revival of Radio Active.

From 2017 to 2022, he featured in Moray Hunter's radio sitcom Alone on BBC Radio 4 playing as Mitch, a widower and part-time therapist.

== Personal life ==
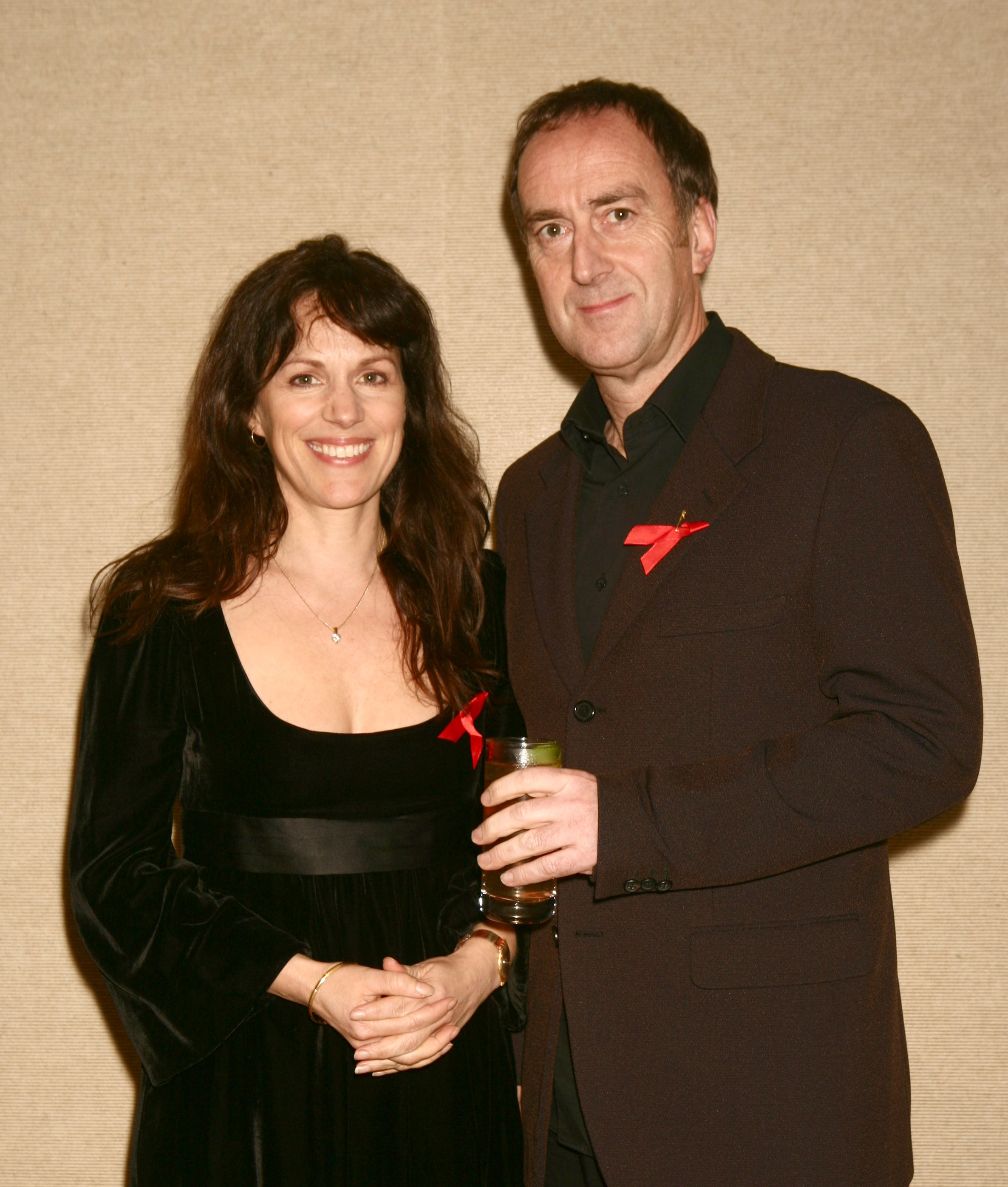
Deayton and his then-partner Lise Mayer in March 2007

At Oxford, Deayton was in a relationship with Helen Atkinson-Wood (later an actress and co-star on Radio Active and KYTV). While touring with the Hee Bee Gee Bees in Australia in the 1980s, Deayton saved Atkinson-Wood's life when he rescued her after she was caught in a rip current while swimming off Sydney's Manly Beach.

In the 1980s, Deayton lived with singer and actress Stephanie De Sykes.

From 1991 to 2015, he was in a relationship with scriptwriter Lise Mayer and they have a son together, to whom Richard Wilson is godfather.

== Filmography ==
| Year | Film | Role | Notes |
|---|---|---|---|
| 1983 | The Black Adder | Jumping Jew of Jerusalem | Episode: "Born to be a King" |
| 1988–1991 | Alexei Sayle's Stuff | Multiple characters | TV series |
| 1989–1993 | KYTV | Mike Channel | TV series |
| 1990–2000 | One Foot in the Grave | Patrick Trench | TV series |
| 1990–2002 | Have I Got News for You | Presenter | TV series |
| 1991 | Mr. Bean | Swimming pool lifeguard | Episode: "The Curse of Mr. Bean" |
| 1991 | Mr. Bean | Man in park | Episode: "The Curse of Mr. Bean" |
| 1991 | Doctor at the Top | Hospital manager | TV series |
| 1993 | If You See God, Tell Him | Bank manager | TV miniseries |
| 1994 | Top of the Pops | Guest presenter | TV series |
| 1995 | In Search of Happiness | Presenter | TV series |
| 1996 | 49th British Academy Film Awards | Presenter | Awards ceremony |
| 1997 | The Lying Game | Presenter | TV series |
| 1998 | Elizabeth | Chancellor of the Exchequer | Film |
| 1999 | The Comedy Trail: A Shaggy Dog Story | Himself | TV special |
| 2000 | The Nearly Complete and Utter History of Everything | Narrator, Peter Mandelson, Sir Walter Raleigh | TV series |
| 2001 | 2001 British Academy Television Awards | Presenter | Awards ceremony |
| 2003 | Absolute Power | Colin Priestley (S01 E04, S02 E06) | TV series |
| 2003, 2005 | University Challenge (Comic Relief editions) | Presenter | Telethon |
| 2004–2005 | Nighty Night | Don Cole | TV series |
| 2004–2007 | Hell's Kitchen | Presenter | TV series |
| 2005 | Heartless | Harry Holland | Film |
| 2005 | 50 Terrible Predictions | Presenter | TV special |
| 2006 | Love and Other Disasters | Himself | Film |
| 2007–2008 | Would I Lie to You? | Presenter | TV series |
| 2008 | British Comedy Awards | Presenter | Awards ceremony |
| 2012 | World's Most Dangerous Roads | Himself | TV series |
| 2012–2014 | Pramface | Mr Alan Derbyshire | TV series |
| 2013–2015 | Waterloo Road | George Windsor | TV series |
| 2014 | Epic Fails | Presenter | 2 TV specials |
| 2015 | The Great European Disaster Movie | Charles Grenada | Documentary film with fictional scenes |
| 2016 | Benidorm | Travel guide | TV series |
| 2017 | Bake Off: Crème de la Crème | Presenter | TV series |
| 2019 | Death in Paradise | Martin Stow | TV series |
| 2019–2020 | Gemma Collins: Diva | Narrator | |
| 2023 | One Foot in the Grave - 30 Years Of Laughs | Himself/Patrick Trench | Documentary |

== Bibliography ==
- Radio Active (with Geoffrey Perkins). Sphere 1986. ISBN 0-7221-2806-1 (a book to tie in with the radio series)
- The Uncyclopaedia of Rock (with Geoffrey Perkins and Jeremy Pascall). Ebury Press 1989. ISBN 0-85223-612-3.
- In Search of Happiness with Angus Deayton (with Lise Mayer). Macmillan 1995. ISBN 0-333-63061-0 (Companion book for a BBC TV series)

== Awards ==
- British Comedy Awards for "Top TV comedy newcomer" (1991)
- British Academy Television Award for Best Entertainment Performance (nominated in 2001 and 2003)

== See also ==
- List of University of Oxford people
- Oxford University Broadcasting Society
- List of Have I Got News for You presenters
- List of Top of the Pops presenters
- The British Environment and Media Awards
