= Adaptations of works by Douglas Adams =

Lists of adaptations of works by the English writer Douglas Adams (1952–2001). Adaptations are only included if Adams had no involvement with the act of adaptation.

== Literature ==
Year	Title	Author or adapter	First edition publisher	Notes	Ref.
1997	Douglas Adams's Starship Titanic: A Novel	Terry Jones	Pan Books	Based on the video game Starship Titanic	
2005	The Hitchhiker's Guide to the Galaxy Radio Scripts: The Tertiary, Quandary and Quintessential Phases	Dirk Maggs	Pan Books	Based on the third, fourth and fifth Hitchhiker's Guide novels	
2009	And Another Thing...	Eoin Colfer	Penguin Books	Sixth and final novel in the Hitchhiker's Guide series	
2012	Shada	Gareth Roberts	BBC Books	Based on the Doctor Who script of the same name	
2015	City of Death	James Goss	BBC Books	Based on the Doctor Who script of the same name	
2017	The Pirate Planet	James Goss	BBC Books	Based on the Doctor Who script of the same name	
2018	Doctor Who and the Krikkitmen	James Goss	BBC Books	Based on Adams' unproduced Doctor Who script	

== Radio and soundtrack ==
Year	Title	Publisher or Broadcaster	Notes	Ref.
2003	Shada	Big Finish Productions	Adapted by Gary Russell from Adams' Doctor Who script; released as both webcast and audio drama. Starring Paul McGann as the Eighth Doctor.	
2004	The Hitchhiker's Guide to the Galaxy: The Tertiary Phase	BBC Radio 4	Adapted by Dirk Maggs from the novel Life, the Universe and Everything	
2005	The Hitchhiker's Guide to the Galaxy: The Quandary Phase	BBC Radio 4	Adapted by Maggs from the novel So Long, and Thanks for All the Fish	
2005	The Hitchhiker's Guide to the Galaxy: The Quintessential Phase	BBC Radio 4	Adapted by Maggs from the novel Mostly Harmless	
2007–2008	Dirk Gently's Holistic Detective Agency	BBC Radio 4	Adapted by Maggs from the first two Dirk Gently novels	
2018	The Hitchhiker's Guide to the Galaxy: The Hexagonal Phase	BBC Radio 4	Adapted by Maggs from the novel And Another Thing... and Adams's unpublished material.	

== Television ==
Year	Title	Broadcaster	Notes	Ref.
2010–2012	Dirk Gently	BBC Four	Based on the Dirk Gently novels	
2016–2017	Dirk Gently's Holistic Detective Agency	BBC America	Based on the Dirk Gently novels	
2018	Doctor Who: The Lost Episode	BBC America	Partly-animated reconstruction of Shada; first released on home video by BBC Worldwide in 2017	

== Theatre ==
Year	Title	Debut venue	Notes	Ref.
1979	The Hitchhiker's Guide to the Galaxy	Institute of Contemporary Arts	Produced by Ken Campbell and presented by his Science Fiction Theatre of Liverpool; Adams contributed new material to the 1980 staging at the Rainbow Theatre	
1980	The Hitchhiker's Guide to the Galaxy	Theatr Clwyd	Adapted by director Jonathan Petherbridge from Adams' radio scripts	
1992	Dirk	Oxford Playhouse	Adapted by James Goss and Arvind Ethan David from the novel Dirk Gently's Holistic Detective Agency	
