= The Long Dark Tea-Time of the Soul (radio serial) =

Cast of The Long Dark Tea-Time of the Soul: Rupert Degas, Sally Grace, Dirk Maggs, Michael Roberts, Stephen Moore, Laurel Lefkow, Sue Adams, John Langdon, Harry Enfield, Douglas's Mum, Peter Davison, Jon Glover, Olivia Colman, Jan Ravens, Alison Mackenzie, Rebecca Pinfield, Gary Martin, Wayne Forester and Paul Deeley.

The Long Dark Tea-Time of the Soul is an Above the Title Productions radio adaptation, dramatised by Dirk Maggs and John Langdon of Douglas Adams's The Long Dark Tea-Time of the Soul. Starring Harry Enfield, Peter Davison, John Fortune and Stephen Moore, it started broadcasting on 2 October 2008 on BBC Radio 4.

The title is a quotation from the Adams novel Life, The Universe and Everything, where it says of the immortally annoyed Wowbagger:

...it was the Sunday afternoons he couldn't cope with, and that terrible listlessness which starts to set in ... as you stare at the clock the hands will move relentlessly on to four o'clock, and you will enter the long dark teatime of the soul...

== Changes between the novel and the radio adaptation ==
In adapting the story for six half-hour episodes, Dirk Maggs rescheduled the novel's convoluted plot:

The challenge was to retain Douglas's mischievous delight in strewing barrel loads of red herrings across the path of his detective story - all of which prove to be vital clues to its solution...

— Dirk Maggs

The adaptation is an inverted detective story, shuffling the importance of characters: elevating the Draycotts, turning Neil Sharp into Kate Schechter's landlord and former Pugilism and the Third Autistic Cuckoo member with the now returned Richard MacDuff. Cleaner Elena is inadvertently kidnapped by Nobby the Pawnbroker, after the battle with a ravenous fridge.

On the audio trailer, Susan Way sells Way Forward Technologies to Sirius Cybernetics, Richard MacDuff is detained by the Vogon catchphrase "resistance is useless", and the I-Ching Calculator has the 'Guide activation' sound, and is obtained from Nobby.

Some of the characters and plot devices employed here are ... inspired by Douglas's notes .. so brief they are not included in ... The Salmon of Doubt. On Douglas's hard drive a sub-folder marked "The Old Salmon" contains a document named "The Whole Resource (Relevant)", forty-three pages of his earliest notes ... quite a few ... feature characters .. from his previous magnum opus [The Hitchhiker's Guide to the Galaxy] ... these have informed ... passages in these recordings, and ... the [now cancelled] third radio series next year.

— Dirk Maggs

Examples of updating to bring the story into the 21st century (the book was written in the 1980s) include the explosion now being at Heathrow Terminal 5 (with a new joke about lost luggage), this now being explained as "freak indoor Global Warming", various price increases, the introduction of mobile phones, e.g. text messages replacing telegrams, a discussion about only audio purists still using gramophones and the removal of American Kate's frustration at the unavailability of pizza delivery in the UK (now thankfully ancient history).

Kate awakes earlier in the hospital and sees Mr Rag taking away Thor and the soft drinks machine, and when she visits the Woodshead clinic she mentions Thor directly, rather than dropping many hints.

When Dirk meets Sally Mills, he does not steal the book, as it proffered instead. Sally also remarks that the I-Ching calculator allows Dirk a way around obeying The Great Zaganza prediction that "everything you decide today will be wrong".

Episode 4 contains a telephone conversation where Richard MacDuff explains to Dirk that the motherboard of the I-Ching calculator was rubbish and is better put to use as an ultimate talking multi-media hand-held device. Hitchhiker's sound effects are used (as in the first series visit to the Mothership) and there is also a potentially familiar Sirius Cybernetics functionary.

In addition, the double-bass player's obvious question is changed from "I bet you wished you played the piccolo" to "how do you get it under your chin?", and Dirk forgets to ask Kate to phone him "before doing anything impossible".

== Episodes ==
1. Aired 2 October 2008: Dirk Gently loses a secretary and Odin sells his soul.
2. Aired 9 October 2008: Inspector Gilks makes a discovery and Dirk breaks a nose.
3. Aired 16 October 2008: Dirk buys a nifty gadget and Kate visits an iffy clinic.
4. Aired 23 October 2008: Thor drops a Clanger in Sharp's Flat.
5. Aired 30 October 2008: Dirk outwits an Eagle and the Draycotts find an eager nitwit
6. Aired 6 November 2008: Thor succeeds in losing his temper and Dirk fails to save himself

== Cast ==
The returning characters are:

- Richard MacDuff - Billy Boyd
- Detective Sergeant Gilks - Jim Carter
- Janice Pearce - Olivia Colman
- Dirk Gently - Harry Enfield
- Constable Luke, RAF Pilot 1 - Wayne Forester

New characters:

- Nurse Sally Mills - Morwenna Banks
- Simon Draycott - Peter Davison
- Thor - Rupert Degas
- Nobby Paxton - Michael Fenton Stevens
- Dr Standish - John Fortune
- Geoff Anstey, Bates - Jon Glover
- Elena - Sally Grace
- Mysterious Vagrant, Vagrant King, Green Hairy Monster, Viking Announcer - Philip Jackson
- Kate Schechter - Laurel Lefkow
- Viking Announcer - Gary Martin
- Odin, Sirius Cybernetics functionary - Stephen Moore
- Neil Sharp, RAF Pilot 2 - Philip Pope
- Cynthia Draycott - Jan Ravens
- Toe Rag - Michael Roberts
- Tsuliwaensis - Susan Sheridan
- Sarah Montague - Sarah Montague
- Announcer - John Marsh

== Production ==
- Music composer - Philip Pope
- Executive Producer - Sioned Wiliam
- Producers - Jo Wheeler and Dirk Maggs

== Awards ==
The adaptation of The Long Dark Tea-Time of the Soul won The Comedy.co.uk Award for "Best British Radio Sitcom of 2008".
