= Dirk Gently's Holistic Detective Agency =

1987 novel by Douglas Adams

- First edition
- Author: Douglas Adams
- Language: English
- Series: Dirk Gently
- Genre: Science fiction, Detective Fiction
- Publisher: UK: William Heinemann Ltd., US: Pocket Books
- Publication date: 1987
- Publication place: United Kingdom
- Media type: Print (paperback and hardcover), audiobook (cassette and compact disc)
- Pages: 306 (paperback edition)
- ISBN: 0-671-69267-4
- OCLC: 320855177
- Followed by: The Long Dark Tea-Time of the Soul

Dirk Gently's Holistic Detective Agency is a humorous detective novel by English writer Douglas Adams, published in 1987. It is described by the author on its cover as a "thumping good detective-ghost-horror-who dunnit-time travel-romantic-musical-comedy-epic".

The book was followed by a sequel, The Long Dark Tea-Time of the Soul. The recurring major characters are the eponymous Dirk Gently, his secretary Janice Pearce and Sergeant Gilks. Adams began work on another novel, The Salmon of Doubt, with the intention of publishing it as the third book in the series, but died before completing it.

A BBC Radio 4 adaptation of six episodes was broadcast from October 2007. A second series based on the sequel was broadcast from October 2008. A 2010 television adaptation for BBC Four borrowed some of the characters and some minor plot elements of the novel to create a new story, and a 2016 television adaptation for BBC America served as a continuation of the books.

== Writing ==
The genesis of the novel was in two Doctor Who serials written by Adams, City of Death (in which an alien tries to change history at the cost of erasing humanity from existence) and in particular the cancelled serial Shada, which first introduces a Cambridge professor called Chronotis who is hundreds of years old. He has been living and working at a Cambridge college for centuries, apparently attracting no attention (noting with appreciation that the porters are very discreet). In Shada, Chronotis's longevity is due to him being a Time Lord, and his time machine is an early model TARDIS. These trademark elements from Doctor Who were removed by Adams for Dirk Gently. Shada was cancelled before completion due to a production strike and later released on VHS with Tom Baker narrating the unfilmed segments. The story was also animated in 2017 and released on DVD.

A number of elements in the novel were inspired by Adams' time at university. For example, one plot thread involves moving a sofa that is irreversibly stuck on the staircase to Richard MacDuff's apartment; according to his simulations, not only is it impossible to remove it, but there is no way for it to have got into that position in the first place. In a similar incident that occurred while Douglas Adams attended St John's College, Cambridge, furniture was placed in the rooms overlooking the river in Third Court while the staircases were being refurbished. When the staircases were completed, it was discovered that the sofas could no longer be removed from the rooms, and the sofas remained in those rooms for several decades.

The South Bank Show revealed that Adams based Chronotis' rooms on the rooms he occupied in his third year at university. Likewise, Richard's room — filled with Macintosh computers and synthesisers — was based on Adams' own flat, visited and photographed by Hi-Fi Choice magazine. The piece of music by Bach that is heard aboard the satellite is "Ach bleib bei uns, Herr Jesu Christ" from the cantata "Bleib bei uns, denn es will Abend werden", BWV 6, also an organ chorale, BWV 649. Adams stated that this was his personal "absolutely perfect" piece of music, and that he listened to it "over and over; drove my wife completely insane" while writing Dirk Gently's Holistic Detective Agency.

== Plot summary ==
The novel opens on a hellish landscape, devoid of almost all life. Its sole feature is a tower-like object, which suddenly explodes.

The narrative then moves forward in time four billion years and switches to the perspective of an Electric Monk — a device resembling a human being and created for the purpose of believing things. This particular Monk, however, is faulty, and its alien creators have thus abandoned it in a desert. A door appears on a rock face, and the Monk walks through it.

The computer programmer Richard MacDuff and his former tutor, Urban “Reg” Chronotis, attend a formal dinner at University of Cambridge, where they listen to a reading of Coleridge's Kubla Khan; the narration makes reference to the poem's "second, and altogether stranger part" (this part of the poem does not exist in the real world). After dinner, Richard remembers that he meant to bring his girlfriend Susan Way, who is also the sister of his boss Gordon, but completely forgot.

Meanwhile, Gordon is driving to his country house and, as is his habit, leaving a long message on Susan's answering machine. When he stops to close the boot of his car, he is killed by a shadowy figure wielding one of Gordon's own hunting guns. Gordon, now a ghost, attempts to manipulate objects around him, but accomplishes nothing other than accidentally terminating the call to Susan.

It is revealed that after going through the door, the Monk found itself in Reg's flat. Whilst wandering the college grounds, the Monk encountered a porter who told it to "shoot off". The Monk hid in the boot of Gordon's car when Gordon stopped for fuel. Not understanding Gordon's "reaction" to being shot, i.e., dying, the Monk leaves the scene of the crime and is eventually picked up by the police.

Richard also leaves a message on Susan's answering machine, rashly promising to take her on holiday that weekend, but immediately regrets it. He then decides to break into her flat and remove the tape. He is spotted in this act by Dirk Gently, an eccentric man he knew at Cambridge. Dirk calls Susan's landline and instructs Richard to meet him nearby, then hangs up.

Richard is instantly seized by remorse and returns the tape to the machine. Immediately afterward, Susan arrives home in the company of her acquaintance Michael Wenton-Weakes. Richard apologizes to Susan, who forgives him. She also hands him the tape from the answering machine without listening to it, asking him to give it to Gordon's secretary for transcription.

The next day, having failed to meet Dirk, Richard looks him up in the phone book and finds an ad for Dirk Gently's Holistic Detective Agency. He goes to the agency's office, where Dirk explains that his detective methods are based on the "fundamental interconnectedness of all things". He believes that there must be a connection between a number of odd events revolving around Richard, including an apparently impossible magic trick Reg performed at dinner.

The pair go to Cambridge to speak with Reg. When asked about the trick, the professor confesses his secret: he is not human, but a being so old that he has forgotten his own origins. His flat is in fact a craft of extraordinary power which can travel through space and time, though, for some reason, it breaks Reg's telephone whenever it's used. To perform the trick, Reg had to go back in time and also visit the planet where the Monk originated; the Monk went through the time machine's door while Reg was not looking. The professor acknowledges this is out of character for himself, since he normally refuses to change the past.

Michael also arrives in Cambridge to ask Reg's assistance. He is possessed by the ghost of an alien engineer, whose crew had left their own war-torn planet in search of another world on which to build a utopia based around the creation of music. When the aliens, known as Salaxalans, arrived on Earth four billion years in the past to refuel and repair their ship, the engineer failed to notice a problem in the engines of their landing craft. When they were started, the craft exploded, killing the entire crew and leaving their deserted mothership still in orbit. The ghost has spent millennia trying to set this right. To this end, he has possessed a number of individuals, including Samuel Taylor Coleridge, whose work he influenced. The curious actions of Richard, Reg, and even the Electric Monk were also caused by the ghost possessing them. Each subject ultimately proved unsuitable, but the engineer finally succeeded with Michael.

Gordon realizes that he will only be able to end his ghosthood if he finishes leaving a message on Susan's answering machine. He stumbles across the scene of a murder, which gives him the emotional energy needed to use a phone. He records a message telling his sister of the crime and hangs up, which enables him to "[fall] back to his own rest and vanish".

After Michael has walked into the poisonous atmosphere of pre-organic Earth, Richard receives a phone call from Susan. She has listened to Gordon's message, which informed her that the murder victim was a professional rival of Michael's, who received a job Michael thought should have been his. Richard realizes that the ghost lied: the aliens were intending to colonize Earth, but the accident robbed them of the opportunity. Michael is an acceptable host because of his willingness to go to extremes to "fix" a mistake.

To stop the engineer, Richard, Reg, and Dirk travel to Somerset in 1797 and interrupt Coleridge at work. This prevents the second part of Kubla Khan from being written, which the engineer had originally influenced Coleridge to write and which contained instructions for preventing the landing craft explosion "once you knew what you were looking for." Reg also slips away to make "a few adjustments", and a few minutes later, a small light in the sky flares up and disappears, implying the mothership has either left or been destroyed.

In the present day, Richard discovers Susan performing a cello piece that is hauntingly reminiscent of the Salaxalans' music; he is baffled when she tells him it was composed by someone called "Bach". Reg admits that he recorded a portion of the Salaxalans' harmonies and gave it to the composer. Richard begs him to go back to the mothership and retrieve more, but Reg says this will not be possible, as the mothership is gone, and a man from British Telecom has come and fixed the phone, which has "burnt out" the time machine.

== Literary significance and reception ==
Reviewing the book for The Times, John Nicholson wrote it was "endearingly dotty", but doubted its commercial potential. Austin MacCurtain of the Sunday Times reviewed the paperback edition in 1988, saying that it was "more of the same" as Hitchhiker's, and that the "cosmic romp is stretched thin at times but will not disappoint fans". The book was the 9th highest-selling hardback in the UK in 1987.

J. Michael Caparula reviewed Dirk Gently's Holistic Detective Agency in Space Gamer/Fantasy Gamer No. 84. Caparula commented that "The writing is wry and quite British, and the novel's quirky spirit is reminiscent of Rudy Rucker's mathematical farces. A nice change for Adams, proof that his talent goes far beyond the meandering Hitchhiker saga."

In 1990, the Magill Book Reviews said "The author's whimsical sense of humor and his sense that the universe has many unexplored possibilities will arouse the interest of a wide readership."

This novel caused Adams to become acquainted with the evolutionary biologist Richard Dawkins. As Dawkins explains, "As soon as I finished it, I turned back to page one and read it straight through again – the only time I have ever done that, and I wrote to tell him so. He replied that he was a fan of my books, and he invited me to his house in London." Adams would later introduce Dawkins to the woman who was to become his third wife, the actress Lalla Ward, best known for playing the character Romana in Doctor Who. One of her early serials on the programme was City of Death, which Adams wrote, and which shares certain plot elements with the novel.

== Adaptations ==
On 5 January 1992, Dirk Gently, Richard MacDuff, Dirk's secretary, and the Electric Monk all appeared in the Douglas Adams episode of the British arts documentary series The South Bank Show. Michael Bywater played Dirk, while Paul Shearer played both Richard and the Monk. Several characters from The Hitchhiker's Guide to the Galaxy were also featured, played by the original television series actors.

The book has been adapted for stage performance as Dirk and in 2005, some fans of Douglas Adams produced an amateur radio series based on the first book. Their efforts began and were coordinated on the Douglas Adams Continuum website. Three episodes were completed. Apart from the radio broadcasts, Douglas Adams recorded both unabridged and abridged readings of the first novel for the audiobook market.

=== Radio ===
Dirk Gently's Holistic Detective Agency
- Running time: 30 minutes
- Home station: BBC Radio 4
- Starring: Harry Enfield
- Written by: Douglas Adams, Dirk Maggs
- No. of episodes: 6

Announced on 26 January 2007, BBC Radio 4 commissioned Above the Title Productions to make eighteen 30-minute adaptations of Douglas Adams' Dirk Gently books (including The Long Dark Tea-Time of the Soul and the unfinished The Salmon of Doubt), running in three series of six episodes.

The first series began on 3 October 2007 and features Harry Enfield as Dirk, Billy Boyd as Richard, Olivia Colman as Janice, Jim Carter as Gilks, Andrew Sachs as Reg, Felicity Montagu as Susan, Robert Duncan as Gordon, Toby Longworth as the Monk, Michael Fenton Stevens as Michael, Andrew Secombe, Jon Glover, Jeffrey Holland, Wayne Forester and Tamsin Heatley.

The script for Dirk Gently's Holistic Detective Agency was written by Dirk Maggs, who also directs, and John Langdon. The show was produced by Maggs and Jo Wheeler. As with the previous Hitchhiker's series, the CD version features greatly expanded episodes. There are a number of structural and detail differences between the radio adaptation and the book, mostly to aid the comprehension of the story when split into six half-hour episodes.

Dirk Maggs parted ways with Above the Title Productions when he started his own production company, Perfectly Normal Productions, and so the project was never completed and the proposed radio series of The Salmon of Doubt remains unmade.

=== Comic book ===
Cartoonist Ray Friesen made an unlicensed comic adaptation of the first novel for a book report. A few years later, in 2004, he posted 18 pages of it online as a webcomic.

IDW Entertainment and Ideate Media have adapted Dirk Gently into a limited comic book series and, later, an American television series for BBC America. The comic series premiered in May 2015.

=== Television ===
There have been two television series based on Dirk Gently books and characters.

The first series, Dirk Gently, featuring the character was announced during Hitchcon, a 2009 Hitchhiker's Guide to the Galaxy event to launch the sixth Hitchhiker's book. Ed Victor, a literary agent who represents Adams' estate, announced that a television adaptation of Dirk Gently's Holistic Detective Agency was in production. Stephen Mangan played Gently, with Darren Boyd as Macduff and Helen Baxendale as Susan. It was broadcast on BBC Four on 16 December 2010. The hour-long pilot was well-received, leading to three further episodes being commissioned. These aired on BBC4 during March 2012.

A second series, Dirk Gently's Holistic Detective Agency was released on Netflix in January 2016. BBC America produced 18 episodes starring Samuel Barnett as Dirk Gently, Elijah Wood as Todd Brotzman, Hannah Marks as Amanda Brotzman, and Jade Eshete as Farah Black. As of July 2026 it is available on the Netflix streaming service.
