= Sally Grace =

English actress (1951–2026)

- Born: 10 September 1951; Harrogate, West Riding of Yorkshire, England
- Died: 16 March 2026 (aged 74)
- Education: Guildhall School of Music and Drama
- Occupation: Actress
- Years active: 1973–2026

Sally Grace (10 September 1951 – 16 March 2026) was an English actress who worked extensively on radio and television, as well as in animation.

== Life and career ==
Sally Grace was born in Harrogate, West Riding of Yorkshire, England, on 10 September 1951. She trained at the Guildhall School of Music and Drama.

She was a member of the team on Week Ending, the BBC Radio 4 topical satirical sketch show, where she was the voice of Margaret Thatcher from 1983 onwards, remaining until the series ended in 1998.

Her work with Ken Bruce on Radio 2's What If Show led The Independent on Sunday to describe her as "the best impressionist in the business".

Grace voiced the part of Elena in BBC Radio 4's adaptions of Dirk Gently's Holistic Detective Agency and The Long Dark Tea-Time of the Soul. Her animation roles include the voices of pompous Owl, loud Weasel, and demure but strong-willed Charmer in the popular TV series The Animals of Farthing Wood. She lent her voice to the series Noah's Island, Mr. Bean: The Animated Series, Dennis the Menace, Pongwiffy, Rudi and Trudi, Space Island One, Never the Twain, Solo, The Big One, Aaagh! It's the Mr. Hell Show!, Badly Dubbed Porn, Bedtime, Doubletake and Spaced and the animated short Bob's Birthday.

Grace's other television credits include Why Didn't They Ask Evans?, Sorry! ("Does Your Mother Know You're Out?"), Raffles ("The First Step"), The Ruth Rendell Mysteries ("From Doon With Death"), and Oh, Doctor Beeching! ("Past Love"); she also featured in some episodes of Coronation Street. Later acting roles were as the Queen in Alistair McGowan's sketches about the royal family, and as Betty Marsden in a touring stage adaptation of Round the Horne. Her film credits include Ghost Story (1974) and Boston Kickout (1995).

Grace died from cancer on 16 March 2026, aged 74.
