= Dirk Gently's Holistic Detective Agency (TV series) =

Comic detective television series

- Genre: Black comedy; Drama; Fantasy; Mystery; Thriller
- Based on: Dirk Gently's Holistic Detective Agency and The Long Dark Tea-Time of the Soul by Douglas Adams
- Starring: Samuel Barnett; Elijah Wood; Hannah Marks; Fiona Dourif; Jade Eshete; Mpho Koaho; Michael Eklund; Dustin Milligan; Osric Chau
- Composers: Cristobal Tapia de Veer (season 1); The Newton Brothers (season 2)
- Country of origin: United States
- Original language: English
- No. of seasons: 2
- No. of episodes: 18

Production
- Executive producers: Dean Parisot; David Alpert; Rick Jacobs; Ted Adams; David Ozer; Arvind Ethan David; Zainir Aminullah; Robert C. Cooper; Max Landis
- Producer: Kim Todd
- Production locations: 2404 Guelph Street Vancouver, British Columbia (season 1)
- Editor: Allan Lee
- Running time: 40-54 minutes
- Production companies: UTMK Limited; Ideate Media; IDW Entertainment; Circle of Confusion; AMC Studios

Original release
- Network: BBC America
- Release: October 22, 2016 – December 16, 2017

Related
- Dirk Gently

Dirk Gently's Holistic Detective Agency is a comic science fiction detective television series created and primarily written by Max Landis. The two seasons are inspired by the novel series of the same name by Douglas Adams. The series is co-produced and distributed by BBC America and Netflix, along with AMC Studios, Ideate Media and IDW Entertainment. Filming primarily took place in Vancouver, British Columbia.

The series features an ensemble cast, including Samuel Barnett as the "holistic detective" Dirk Gently, and Elijah Wood as his reluctant sidekick Todd. Other main cast members include Hannah Marks as Todd's sister Amanda, Jade Eshete as security officer Farah Black, Fiona Dourif as "holistic assassin" Bart, and Mpho Koaho as electronics technician Ken. The first season is set in Seattle, Washington, and the second season is set in the fictional town of Bergsberg, Montana.

The eight-episode first season premiered on BBC America on October 22, 2016, to positive reviews, before concluding on December 10, 2016. All episodes were made available on Netflix (outside of the United States) on December 11, 2016. On November 21, 2016, BBC America renewed the series for a 10-episode second season which premiered on October 14, 2017. Following the broadcast of the second-season finale, the show was cancelled.

== Premise ==
The show is based around the eccentric Dirk Gently (Samuel Barnett) who claims to be a "holistic detective", investigating obscure cases based on the inter-connectivity of all things. During the first season, he befriends Todd Brotzman (Elijah Wood) and Farah Black (Jade Eshete) who help him with his cases. Dirk's past is linked with "Project Blackwing", a secret CIA project to evaluate subjects with strange abilities. Dirk is not only followed by agents of Blackwing trying to recapture him but also by Bart Curlish (Fiona Dourif), another Blackwing subject who considers herself a "holistic assassin" and believes she is destined to kill Dirk.

== Cast ==
- Samuel Barnett as Dirk Gently, an eccentric "holistic" detective, who believes everything in the universe to be interconnected. He does not solve cases by conventional means, but rather by following fate. It is revealed that he was part of a government organization studying people with 'special' abilities, as he is mildly psychic. He carries himself as excitable and optimistic, as a mask over his own loneliness and insecurity.
- Elijah Wood as Todd Brotzman, Dirk's reluctant sidekick/assistant. A bellhop who spends all of his money to help his sister Amanda afford her treatment for pararibulitis, a fictional disease he claims to have been cured of. It is later revealed he lied about ever having it; moreover he has lied to and stolen from everyone he has ever cared about. He now attempts to atone for his many crimes by taking care of his sister. At the end of season 1, he becomes afflicted by pararibulitis.
- Hannah Marks as Amanda Brotzman, Todd's sister who suffers from pararibulitis, a hereditary disease invented for the show that causes vivid and painful hallucinations. Amanda later joins the Rowdy 3, who help her manage her hallucinations.
- Jade Eshete as Farah Black, an efficient and tough security officer with obsessive-compulsive disorder. After her millionaire boss is killed and his daughter kidnapped, Farah is determined to solve the case alongside Dirk and Todd. She makes every attempt to keep the group safe, even when unsure she is capable of doing so.
- Fiona Dourif as Bart Curlish, a "holistic" assassin who believes that the universe leads her to people she has to kill, and that it won't allow her to die. She feels that she must hunt "Dirk Gently", despite not knowing who or what he is. She and Dirk are mirrors of each other, often paralleling one another from scene to scene. Because of her tendency to directly or indirectly murder people around her, Bart is extremely unsocialized, and has a jaded view of death.
- Mpho Koaho as Ken Adams, an electronics expert whom Bart kidnaps and forces to travel with her. While most of his recent work has been criminal in nature, he admits it is just due to his desperation for a paycheck, and is afraid of any excitement. Over the course of season 1, he befriends Bart, eventually coming to believe in the supernatural. In season 2, he is kidnapped by Blackwing, only to later become its supervisor.

=== Rowdy 3 ===
The Rowdy 3 is a hedonist group first introduced as a group of four. (In season 2, it is revealed that they were initially three.) At the end of season 1, Amanda joins their ranks, making them five. The Rowdy 3 are among the people studied by the government organization tracking Dirk. They were originally classified as vampires because they survive by consuming people's emotional energy. At the end of season 2, the Rowdy 3 gain yet another member, The Beast.

- Michael Eklund as Martin, leader of the Rowdy 3.
- Osric Chau as Vogel (season 2; recurring season 1), the youngest member of the Rowdy 3.
- Viv Leacock as Gripps, a member of the Rowdy 3.
- Zak Santiago as Cross, a member of the Rowdy 3.

=== Recurring ===
==== Introduced in Season 1 ====
===== Law enforcement =====
- Neil Brown Jr. as Det. Estevez, a missing persons detective, and Zimmerfield's partner.
- Richard Schiff as Det. Zimmerfield, a missing persons detective, and Estevez's partner.
- Miguel Sandoval as Col. Scott Riggins, a government agent and Sgt. Friedkin's commanding officer.
- Dustin Milligan as Sgt. Hugo Friedkin, a dimwitted government agent tracking Dirk.
- David Lewis as Agent Weedle, an FBI agent at odds with detectives Estevez and Zimmerfield.
- Fiona Vroom as Jessica Wilson, government overseer of the Blackwing project.

===== Men of the Machine =====
- Aaron Douglas as Gordon Rimmer, the main antagonist of Season 1; a desperate man obsessed with gaining power, prolonging his life, and retrieving his dog.
- Michael Adamthwaite as Zed, a key member of the Men of the Machine.
- Christian Bako as Ed, a key member of the Men of the Machine.
- Mackenzie Gray as Lux Dujour, a disappeared rock star.

===== Spring family =====
- Alison Thornton as Lydia Spring, a missing heiress, daughter of the murdered Patrick Spring.
- Julian McMahon as Patrick Spring / Edgar Spring / Zackariah Webb, a murdered millionaire and father of Lydia Spring. He is revealed to be an inventor, originally from the 19th century, who had accidentally discovered time travel through his experiments with electricity.

==== Introduced in Season 2 ====
===== Bergsberg, Montana law enforcement =====
- Tyler Labine as Sherlock Hobbs, an under-stimulated, but overly enthusiastic small town sheriff who is eager to help Dirk and crew solve a new mystery.
- Izzie Steele as Tina Tevetino, Hobbs' deputy, who is extremely laid back about life and the law and glad that Dirk and his friends' new mystery is bringing much-needed excitement to her currently-boring everyday life.

===== Law enforcement and Blackwing people =====
- Alan Tudyk as Mr. Osmund Priest, a ruthless, dangerous, and violent bounty hunter working for Blackwing.
- Alexia Fast as Mona Wilder, a.k.a. "Project Lamia", a shapeshifter and self-described "holistic actress". She is a Blackwing test subject and close friend of Dirk, whom she has accompanied since before the Spring case, having taken the form of his "Panic Pete" stress toy.

===== Boreton family =====
- Amanda Walsh as Suzie Boreton, an unassuming, insecure, depressed mother. She later becomes a powerful witch and tries to conquer Wendimoor.
- John Stewart as Bob Boreton, Suzie's workaday husband and a motel maintenance worker.
- Jared Ager-Foster as Scott Boreton, Bob and Suzie's delinquent son.

===== Wendimoor people =====
- Christopher Russell as Panto Trost, the eldest Trost son, who leaves Wendimoor in search of Dirk and forges an unlikely friendship with Bart.
- Lee Majdoub as Silas Dengdamor, the eldest Dengdamor son and Panto's lover.
- Ajay Friese as Farson Dengdamor, Silas' younger brother, whose disappearance has brewed conflict between the Trosts and the Dengdamors.
- Aleks Paunovic as Wygar Oak, an imposing warrior and enforcer for the Dengdamor family.
- Emily Tennant as The Beast, a rainbow-haired creature from Wendimoor who becomes infatuated with Dirk. She later joins Amanda and the Rowdy 3.
- John Hannah as The Mage, the main antagonist of Season 2; a powerful wizard who takes great pleasure in his evildoings, seeking to conquer a world not his own.
- Agam Darshi as Wakti Wapnasi, a forest witch who helps Amanda explore her abilities.

== Episodes ==
Season	Episodes	Originally released	
Season	Episodes	First released	Last released
1	8	October 22, 2016	December 10, 2016
2	10	October 14, 2017	December 16, 2017

=== Season 1 (2016) ===
No. overall	No. in season	Title	Directed by	Written by	Original release date	US viewers (millions)
1	1	"Horizons"	Dean Parisot	Max Landis	October 22, 2016	0.437
Seattle bellhop Todd Brotzman has a vision of himself at work before discovering a triple murder in the penthouse, one of the victims being reclusive billionaire Patrick Spring. Todd is put under police investigation by detectives Estevez and Zimmerfield and fired for his connection to the case, returning home to find "holistic detective" Dirk Gently breaking into his apartment. He claims that Todd is there to help him solve Spring's murder, who hired Dirk in advance to investigate. Two government agents following Dirk, Riggins and Friedkin, accidentally shoot at Todd, killing a bald man above his apartment who is about to kill a restrained woman. Dirk tags along to visit Todd's sister Amanda, who suffers from Pararibulitis, a genetic condition that causes painful hallucinations from which Todd claims to have recovered. Returning to Todd's apartment, Dirk is attacked by four men that he identifies as "The Rowdy 3". They destroy Todd's apartment and drain energy from Dirk before leaving. Todd's furious landlord storms in and tries to kill him for stealing money, but accidentally shoots himself in the head. Todd rejects Dirk's insistence that he give into the universe and be rewarded for it, and decides to return a lost corgi he has seen throughout the day to its owner, Gordon Rimmer. Walking home, Todd realizes that a lottery ticket he found at the murder scene is a winner. Todd's boss is killed by two bald men, who are looking for a kitten left at the hotel, which Dirk has. On a remote pier, a man named Ken Adams works for a bald man when he is attacked by Bart Curlish, a homicidal woman who believes that he is Dirk. She forces him to come with her.
2	2	"Lost & Found"	Dean Parisot	Max Landis	October 29, 2016	0.293
The day before Spring's murder, Rimmer lures Spring's bodyguard, Farah Black, to Todd's apartment building. The bald men ambush Farah, who flees to Todd's door. However, he is too intimidated by her to let her in. In the present, she frees herself from a bed just as the bald men arrive. Dirk and Todd sneak into Rimmer's house and run into Spring's missing daughter Lydia, who is acting like a dog. Rimmer discovers them when Todd gets a call from Amanda, whom the Rowdy 3 are following. Todd and Dirk flee with Rimmer's corgi. Rimmer orders them to meet on a bridge and give him the dog or he will kill Farah, whom Dirk knows. Two FBI agents follow the duo. As Rimmer continues to threaten them for something they apparently did to him, Todd threatens to drop the dog off the bridge if he does not surrender Farah, only to drop it in shock when Lydia's face materializes and begs him to help her. They escape with Farah when the agents intervene, one of them being killed by the bald men, while the corgi swims to shore and flees. Estevez and Zimmerfield learn that the men in the penthouse were supposedly killed by a shark; the bodies of the two bald men killed there are missing. When they return later, a different coroner is there, who does not know the man they talked to before. Ken and Bart's car breaks down and they are accosted by a friendly biker. He tries to shoot Bart, who reveals that she cannot be harmed before killing him. Riggins' superior meets with him about "Project Blackwing", something Dirk is part of, and warns him that she will begin killing the subjects if they cannot be detained.
3	3	"Rogue Wall Enthusiasts"	Michael Patrick Jann	Max Landis	November 5, 2016	0.297
In 2001, rock star Lux Dujour is brought to Rimmer's house, where a woman named Rainey murdered Rimmer's wife. She orders Dujour swapped into Rimmer's body, and he is dragged away to be switched against his will. Dirk and Farah go to Spring's manor, where a letter from Spring is only supposed to be opened by her in Dirk's presence. It contains a map of the manor, leading them to a secret back room. There, a note from Spring begs them to save Lydia. A crank and a lightbulb that reacts to human touch are there. Amanda has a Pararibulitis attack, having her energy drained by the Rowdy 3, which stops the attack. Todd hurries to her after learning what happened and asks her to stay with him for some days. Dirk, Farah and Amanda realize that blueprints taken from the mansion are actually a map of the area, the center point being Todd's apartment. Todd privately reveals to Dirk that his neighborhood is called "Springsborough", admits that Dirk may be telling the truth about his holisticism and promises to help him. Dirk is confronted by Riggins, whom he fearfully rejects. Zimmerfield finds Rimmer's corgi, who was sitting outside the police station and trying to get the attention of cops. Ken and Bart are kidnapped by the gang of the man they killed. Bart soon frees herself and kills them all, leading Ken to have a similar epiphany to Todd.
4	4	"Watkin"	Michael Patrick Jann	Andy Black	November 12, 2016	0.248
Rimmer has the living FBI agent's soul swapped with bald man Fred using a machine. He swaps the agent into a mouse and has Lydia eat him. Fred goes to the detectives and almost reveals that the bald men pulled the bodies from the penthouse, but covers by saying that it was the FBI, contradicting what the agents told them earlier. Dirk, Todd, and Farah follow the map to a building in the center of a park, and Dirk and Todd fall into an underground maze when they use the crank. Farah returns to check on Amanda, saving her from Fred, who has come looking for Todd. Dirk and Todd go through two rooms that almost kill them, one where the walls close in and they use the lightbulb to escape, and one where they must be electrocuted by the spirit of Spring's pet rhino. They arrive in a room with computer screens, the puzzle it displays being one Dirk knows the answer to. The screens display a map before catching on fire. The Rowdy 3 then arrive and break the wall down, saving them. Amanda gets the screens to turn back on, allowing them to preserve the map, which comes with a personalized message to Dirk and Todd. Rimmer courts Lux Dujour's ex-lover and takes her to the building he swapped the agent in, revealing to her that he is Dujour as the bald men gather around them. He addresses them, saying that he knows that they have reasons to doubt him, but assures that he is still doing his part by killing the woman with Dujour's guitar.
5	5	"Very Erectus"	Tamra Davis	Robert C. Cooper	November 19, 2016	0.240
Dirk and Todd follow Spring's map out to Skagit Valley and stop at a diner. There, Dirk buys Todd the same shirt he was wearing when he saw himself at the hotel. The two dig up pieces that are constructed into one machine, something they realize Rimmer and the bald men are looking for. A bald man and the fake coroner attack them. Dirk throws the kitten at them. Bursting from it, a shark's soul kills the men. The kitten turns out to have been the weapon used to kill Spring. Todd admits that he never had Pararibulitis and lied about it to get money, and almost dying made him realize that he did not want Amanda to never know. The kitten then goes missing. While looking for it, Dirk tells Todd that he should be less hard on himself, and Todd resolves to tell Amanda the truth. Estevez and Zimmerfield go against their chief's wishes and visit Rimmer's old place of work, a zoo, investigating the building that Rimmer uses to swap souls. They find dead bodies inside, and Zimmerfield is killed as they return outside to call it in. Farah, having tracked the detectives, saves Estevez's life and sees Rimmer driving Lydia away. Bart and Ken hole up in a hotel after arriving in Seattle, and she eventually leaves to go find Dirk. Amanda runs off with the Rowdy 3, who promise to drain her energy any time she has an attack. Riggins attempts to bring them in peacefully, but Friedkin panics and takes Amanda hostage, giving the 3 time to escape. Friedkin recounts the incident to his superior, who suggests that Riggins may be too emotionally attached to the subjects to be effective.
6	6	"Fix Everything"	Tamra Davis	Max Landis	November 26, 2016	0.198
In 1886, inventor Zackariah Webb, who built Spring's manor, tries and fails to build his unlimited energy device until he accidentally makes it vanish, only for it to reappear with a blood-soaked note signed by Dirk. Estevez, correctly suspecting his boss to be with the bald men, is fired and takes the corgi with him, getting it to confirm that it is Lydia. Todd tells Amanda the truth. She is heartbroken. As Estevez comes to visit Todd, believing him to be in league with the bald men too, Amanda has an attack, forcing them to take her out of the building. The bald men attack Todd after Estevez leaves, but the Rowdy 3 stop them and heal Amanda. Todd tries to give her the lottery ticket, but she tears it up and leaves in disgust. The bald men then kidnap him. Bart attacks Dirk on the street but soon finds that he is difficult to kill, and hesitates when she corners him, realizing that they are similar. Farah stabs her in the leg, and Ken drags her away. Realizing that they are in over their heads, Dirk and Farah call Fred, only for him to incapacitate them. The bald men bring Dirk and Todd to Rimmer's zoo building, who reveals that he is just as confused as they are. Dirk notices that the bald men have their own machine and has a realization. Todd takes advantage of a distraction to punch Rimmer and lock themselves in the soul exchanging room. Dirk promises that they are going to stop the murder from happening and activates the machine, making them both vanish.
7	7	"Weaponized Soul"	Paco Cabezas	Max Landis	December 3, 2016	0.307
Dirk and Todd arrive one week in the past and witness Rimmer's group switching Lydia's soul with his corgi, planning to bargain with Spring for his version of the machine. Rainey's group storms in and confronts Rimmer, taking the corgi as Rimmer's group leaves. A man in a suit of armor storms in and massacres Rainey's group, stopping short of killing Dirk and Todd when Dirk deduces that he is Spring. Dirk has solved the case: Webb accidentally invented a time machine and jumped forward into the sixties to retrieve it, only to find that a cult led by Rainey had started around it, renaming himself "Edgar Spring" and going to war with the cult, who had figured out how to use it to switch souls. By the nineties, he was pretending to be Edgar's non-existent son Patrick when he met his wife, with whom he had Lydia before the cult killed her, prompting him to jump to 2016 and kill off the rest of the men. Spring leaves, and Todd, excited at the prospect of fixing everything that went wrong, steals a zoo truck with the lottery ticket inside and leaves for the hotel. They sneak in the back and steal his own master key, while past-Spring interrupts Rimmer and future-Spring's meeting just as Dirk and Todd arrive, the latter dropping the lottery ticket in the process. Past-Spring shoots the cultist holding the kitten, causing the shark to emerge and kill future-Spring. Dirk and Todd run into past-Dirk, called to the hotel by future-Spring, and Dirk gives him Todd's address and orders him to get the kitten. Enraged that Dirk understood they were in a time loop, Todd shouts at him, only to realize that he is in the same position he saw himself in the day of the murder and turns to see past-Todd. They flee the hotel, where Todd forces Spring to realize that his obsession with fixing his mistake has destroyed his own life. Spring regretfully decides to return to 2001 and prepare for his death. Todd says that he no longer wants to associate with Dirk after the case is over for withholding information. They return to the present and are wounded by Rimmer's men. Farah, trapped in the trunk of Fred's car, tries to shoot her way out, attracting Fred's attention and forcing her to kill him using his rearview mirror.
8	8	"Two Sane Guys Doing Normal Things"	Paco Cabezas	Andy Black & Max Landis	December 10, 2016	0.277
Estevez arrives and damages the cult's machine while trying to kill Rimmer, who escapes. Farah, Dirk and Todd explain what is happening to him, and that there is another working machine plug in Spring's manor. The cult arrives at the manor as Dirk's group switches Lydia back, but the Rowdy 3 intervene, forcing Rimmer to go in without backup. Farah distracts Rimmer with his corgi and kills him. Dirk, Todd and Lydia try to send the machine back to restart the loop, only for the two remaining cultists to break in, shooting Dirk again. Bart enters and saves them, considering killing Dirk but using her last bullet to kill the last cultist. Ken, realizing that the machine is identical to what he was hired by the cult to build, fixes it and leaves with Bart. Dirk writes a note and attaches it to the machine before sending it back in time and collapsing from blood loss, being visited by Riggins in the hospital while unconscious, who says that he is proud of him. Todd awakens in his apartment, talking with Amanda, who does not forgive him but points out that Dirk changed his life for the better. Moved by her words, he talks to Dirk and reassures their friendship. Estevez goes to confront his boss, only to find that Friedkin has killed him, now the head of Blackwing, and kills Estevez for knowing too much. Blackwing squadrons attack the Rowdy 3 and Bart. Amanda is sent to run away with Vogel, the 3's youngest member, while the others fight the agents. Dirk impulsively exits the diner after expressing discomfort and is kidnapped by Friedkin. Todd then has a Pararibulitis attack after getting a panicked call from Amanda.

=== Season 2 (2017) ===
No. overall	No. in season	Title	Directed by	Written by	Original release date	US viewers (millions)
9	1	"Space Rabbit"	Douglas Mackinnon	Max Landis	October 14, 2017	0.235
In the mystical land of Wendimoor, the urban Dengdamor clan are at war with the rural Trosts, believing that they have kidnapped their prince Farson. Princes and lovers Silas Dengdamor and Panto Trost meet in secret as Panto resolves to find Dirk, who is meant to fulfill a Wendimoor prophecy. In Bergsberg, Montana, disabled and miserable housewife Suzie Boreton meets Wendimoor wizard The Mage at her job, who kills her boss for backing out on a deal with him. Using a wand and spell book, he sends men to kill her, but Bart interrupts them while looking for Ken. Suzie, terrified of her, uses the wand to incapacitate her. Todd and Farah, now wanted by the FBI, travel to Bergsberg to meet with Farah's brother, where Todd has a Pararibulitis attack in front of sheriff Sherlock Hobbs. They happen upon a dilapidated house and Todd chases a rabbit into a field, believing it to be somehow connected to Dirk. Farah tries to get him to stop, believing that they will never find him, until they are interrupted by a car falling out of a tree. Dirk, who has been in a Blackwing facility for two months, suffers under Friedkin's insistence that he can control his abilities. Friedkin's stress toy breaks into Dirk's room by shapeshifting and turns into a woman he seems to recognize, ordering him to "find the boy" before splashing him with water, causing him to vanish.
10	2	"Fans of Wet Circles"	Douglas Mackinnon	Russel Friend & Garrett Lerner	October 21, 2017	0.245
Silas tries to convince his mother that The Mage is manipulating them into fighting with the Trosts, to no avail. Todd and Farah find a decaying body in the passenger seat of the car, only for Dirk to pop out of the trunk. Hobbs, having discovered Todd and Farah's wanted status, arrives and arrests all three of them. While in holding cells, Dirk explains that their new case is to "find the boy." Hobbs and deputy Tina Teventino decide to let the trio go because they like them. They investigate the abandoned house, which belonged to the Cardenas family; wife Marina Cardenas is the body they found in the car. As The Mage stalks Hobbs and Farah, he explains that the adults in the family went missing days before a power surge that tore the town apart in 1967. Todd, Dirk and Tina find a gun that shoots powerful circles of compressed air in the barn, and find Hector Cardenas' body in a tree while testing the gun on it. Dirk notices height marks on a Cardenas house wall. Unsure what to do about Dirk's vanishing, Friedkin tries to talk to the captured Rowdy 3, who almost kill him with their draining abilities until retired Blackwing hitman Osmund Priest arrives and neutralizes them, announcing his intent to help Friedkin recapture the missing subjects. Suzie stays home and uses her new powers to improve her appearance and fix her limp, but is brushed off by her husband Bob. She casts a spell on him that makes her obey his commands, and makes him kill their constantly barking dog. Her delinquent son Scott accidentally hits Panto with his car, revealing that he is now in the real world.
11	3	"Two Broken Fingers"	Michael Patrick Jann	Matt Goldman	October 28, 2017	0.219
The Dengdamors burn the Trost farmland. Their king, believing Panto is dead, accepts a gift of guns from The Mage's knights. Bart arrives at the Bergsberg police station and allows herself to be detained, asking them to investigate Suzie. Suzie goes to a local book club, where she confronts the other women for apparently abandoning her, only to kill them when they point out how cruel she was before she became disabled. She witnesses The Mage vaporizing the bodies of the men Bart killed and he tries to take the wand back from her, but she resists him and flees. Bob attacks Dirk when they go to interrogate him, forcing them to restrain him. Tina takes Farah to investigate when Scott calls the police after hitting Panto, and they arrest Panto when he tries to attack them. He tells Dirk that he is the center of the Wendimoor prophecy. Unable to decrypt Blackwing's old data files, Friedkin asks Ken for help, who has been stuck in the same Blackwing room since his capture. He agrees on the condition that he is let out. Amanda and Vogel, still on the run from Blackwing, are tracked down by Priest and cornered in a hotel room, until they vanish after stepping into the shower.
12	4	"The House Within the House"	Michael Patrick Jann	Robert C. Cooper	November 4, 2017	0.212
Amanda and Vogel land in Wendimoor, being captured by The Mage's knights and stuck in a cage with the captured Farson and a feral woman, known as "the Beast." Dirk falls down a colorful slide in the Cardenas house that leads to a bizarre, cartoonish version of the house that features a monster that stalks him. As it corners him behind a table with scissors embedded in it that oozes blood, Todd arrives with the air gun and stuns it, forcing him and Dirk out of the house. Todd and Amanda have simultaneous attacks, causing them to hallucinate each other. Amanda is confronted by the knights' commander, Lord Triangle Badevil, who prepares to kill her until she has an electric attack that she manifests into real electricity, stunning the knights and giving her time to free Farson. Realizing the scissors fit in a wound in Hector's head and that they may have a connection with the scissor-like blade Panto wields, Dirk takes Panto the Cardenas house, where he tears up the wallpaper in an empty room to reveal the history of Wendimoor drawn on the walls. The Mage fights Suzie for the wand and wins, but decides to let her keep it on the condition that she kills Dirk for him.
13	5	"Shapes and Colors"	Richard Laxton	Max Landis	November 11, 2017	0.248
Farah and Hobbs interview Suzie, who pins the magical events on Scott. Dirk, Todd and Tina encounter Arnold, the son of the Cardenas family, and when they take him to the Cardenas house, he appears intimately familiar with Wendimoor's history. He has a heart attack when they bring him into the station and he sees Panto. The group goes to a music festival where Scott is in attendance in hopes of arresting him, while Hobbs stays behind to make sure Arnold is alright. Todd sees Suzie moving through the crowd with the wand, realizing she is the one they're looking for, and she accidentally casts an aphrodisiac spell before losing her wand in the crowd. Farson leads Amanda to forest witch Wakti Wapnasi, who helps her exploit her Pararibulitis to connect to the fabric of reality, pulling the rest of the Rowdy 3 out of Blackwing and using them to fight off the approaching knights. The Mage finds the mural of him losing in the Cardenas house, which enrages him, and he attacks Hobbs when they run into each other.
14	6	"Girl Power"	Richard Laxton	Sinead Daly	November 18, 2017	0.256
In the 1960s, the Cardenases are driving through Bergsberg, arguing, until a boat crashes into a field, where they discover a crying baby. Suzie turns Scott into a toad despite him having had an epiphany and resolving to treat her better, and tracks down Arnold's hospital. At the same time, Dirk concludes that Arnold must be the boy and they go to visit him. Priest, now guided by Ken, follows Dirk to the hospital and unwittingly saves them from Suzie, but she separates Tina from the group and kills Arnold as he deliriously affirms the existence of Wendimoor and insists that "I betrayed him." Priest pursues them to the Cardenas house, easily dispatching Farah as Dirk and Todd hide in the Wendimoor mural room. Todd realizes there is a bed built into the wall with a wet spot on it, and, remembering Dirk was wet when he emerged from the trunk of the car, convinces Dirk to tip the bed into the wall with him, making them both vanish. A deranged, bloodied Suzie returns to The Mage and demands to be sent to Wendimoor.
15	7	"This Is Not Miami"	Wayne Yip	Molly Nussbaum	November 25, 2017	0.282
In 1966, Hector is attacked by the monster from the house inside his house, which Marina concludes is because their son is having a nightmare, coaxing him to get rid of it. Dirk and Todd arrive in Wendimoor, but the former is despondent over getting Arnold killed, choosing to stay with the Beast, while Todd runs off to find Amanda. He is captured by Silas and his bodyguard Wygar Oak. Amanda convinces Farson that he needs to go home and end the feud between his families, and they are met by Panto's sister, also hoping to end the feud. The two parties meet on the bridge just as their families arrive. Farson tries to negotiate peace, but Badevil covertly kills him with a rifle, spurring the families to massacre each other as Todd and Amanda narrowly escape. They hurry to Wapnasi, only to find her killed by Suzie, who declares herself The Mage's replacement. The Beast shows Dirk drawings on the walls of the room he came out in, which depict the story of the Cardenas family, and he deduces that the Cardenases had two sons. Suddenly coming to a realization, he runs off to go find Todd.
16	8	"Little Guy, Black Hair"	Wayne Yip	Russel Friend & Garrett Lerner	December 2, 2017	0.259
In 1967, Marina accidentally kills Hector with a pair of scissors. As Arnold watches in horror, his younger brother makes his father's body disappear and sends their mother's car into the sky with her inside. Farah and Tina free Bob from Suzie's control, leaving him almost catatonic, but they manage to get out of him that The Mage is at the town quarry. They find Hobbs loading dynamite into his police car, and The Mage burns them with his wand. Todd and Amanda are captured by the Dengdamors, managing to start piecing their relationship together while waiting for execution, and are saved by Dirk, the Beast, and the Rowdy 3, taking Silas with them in hopes of getting him to see reason. When Silas says that Wendimoor has only existed for three generations, Dirk explains the case. The Cardenases discovered their second son on the Bergsberg boat and learned that he had strange powers: the ability to create anything while he was asleep. After he accidentally killed his mother, Arnold reported him to Blackwing, and he had a seizure and caused the power surge while trying to create Wendimoor in a panic, which worked but put him into a coma. Blackwing labeled him as "Project Moloch", someone Dirk had met before, thus making him "the boy." The group expresses joy at solving the case, only for Suzie to approach them.
17	9	"Trouble Is Bad"	Alrick Riley	Max Landis & Molly Nussbaum	December 9, 2017	0.280
Ken deduces that Blackwing project and shapeshifter Mona Wilder, possessed by Wapnasi, caused Dirk and the Rowdy 3 to escape, capturing her and manipulating her into explaining that Wendimoor is real. The Mage makes Farah, Tina and Hobbs shoot each other several times, planning to use Hobbs' car to destroy the portal to Wendimoor, but a wounded Farah shoots the car and incinerates The Mage. Bart and Panto break out of prison and find the Cardenas house taken over by Priest. Ken calls Bart, who tries to convince him to come with, but is disappointed to find he only wants her to come to Blackwing. Panto scars Priest's face when he tries to stop them, and he reunites with Silas upon their return to Wendimoor. They find the families having killed each other save for their parents, who resolve to end the feud when they realize their children are in love, only for all of them to be killed by knights, leaving Bart despondent. Oak sacrifices himself to save Dirk, allowing the group to escape and head for the portal room. As the Rowdy 3 stay behind to hold Suzie off, the Brotzmans reopen the portal after Amanda teaches Todd how to control his Pararibulitis, and Dirk jumps in. Suzie sends a squadron of knights into Blackwing to kill Moloch.
18	10	"Nice Jacket"	Alrick Riley	Story by : Sinead Daly & Max Landis; Teleplay by : Max Landis	December 16, 2017	0.250
Amanda pulls Todd into the space between reality to stop their bodies from getting overwhelmed, only for Suzie to get past the Rowdy 3 and attack them. Todd tries to hold her off, but she overpowers him and starts to torture him to death. Dirk and Mona reunite in Blackwing and convince Friedkin, frustrated with his own stupidity and realizing him moving Moloch opened the door to Wendimoor, to help them get Moloch back. They are intercepted by Badevil, who stabs Friedkin in the chest. Ken, now the supervisor of the facility, kills Badevil and tries to stop Dirk from leaving, but a dying Friedkin holds him off while Dirk and Mona push Moloch through the portal and follow him through. Ken pushes Friedkin in just as the portal closes and he winds up outside reality, where he has an epiphany. Upon his return to Wendimoor, Moloch becomes a young boy again and strips Suzie of her powers, locking her in the sky prison made for The Mage. He sends Todd back to Earth so he can save the Bergsberg group, and he sends Amanda back with the Beast, who joins the Rowdy 3. After encouraging Dirk to keep helping people, he sends him and Mona back, and after Todd reconciles with Amanda fully, he, Dirk and Farah open the detective agency officially. All of the people killed in Wendimoor are revived, and the families make peace, while Scott and Bob are returned to normal and get a new puppy. Moloch finds Bart having killed all the knights and offers to let her stay in Wendimoor, but Bart, feeling as though she is too dangerous to be free, has him send her to Blackwing, where Ken promises they will have a good time together.

== Reception ==
The first season received a favorable response from critics. On Rotten Tomatoes, it has a 71% approval rating based on 28 reviews, with an average rating of 6.54/10. The site's consensus reads "Odd and ambitious, Dirk Gently's Holistic Detective Agency sometimes overdoses on pure weirdness but offers absurdist rewards to those who stick with it." On Metacritic, the first season has a score of 62 out of 100 based on 14 reviews, indicating "generally favorable reviews".

The second season was also received favorably. On Rotten Tomatoes, it has a 100% approval rating based on 13 reviews, with an average rating of 7.33/10. However, its viewership was down from the first season, averaging fewer than 250,000 views per episode compared to 287,000 per episode from Season 1. It is believed these numbers, which were slightly lower than fellow BBC America program Orphan Black, led the choice for the network to cancel the show. Following the broadcast of the second-season finale, BBC America announced the show's cancellation. The decision to cancel the series sparked outrage among fans of the show, and a petition was started to renew the series. As of March 2018, the petition had received over 100,000 signatures.
