= Panic Pete =

Novelty rubber squeeze toy

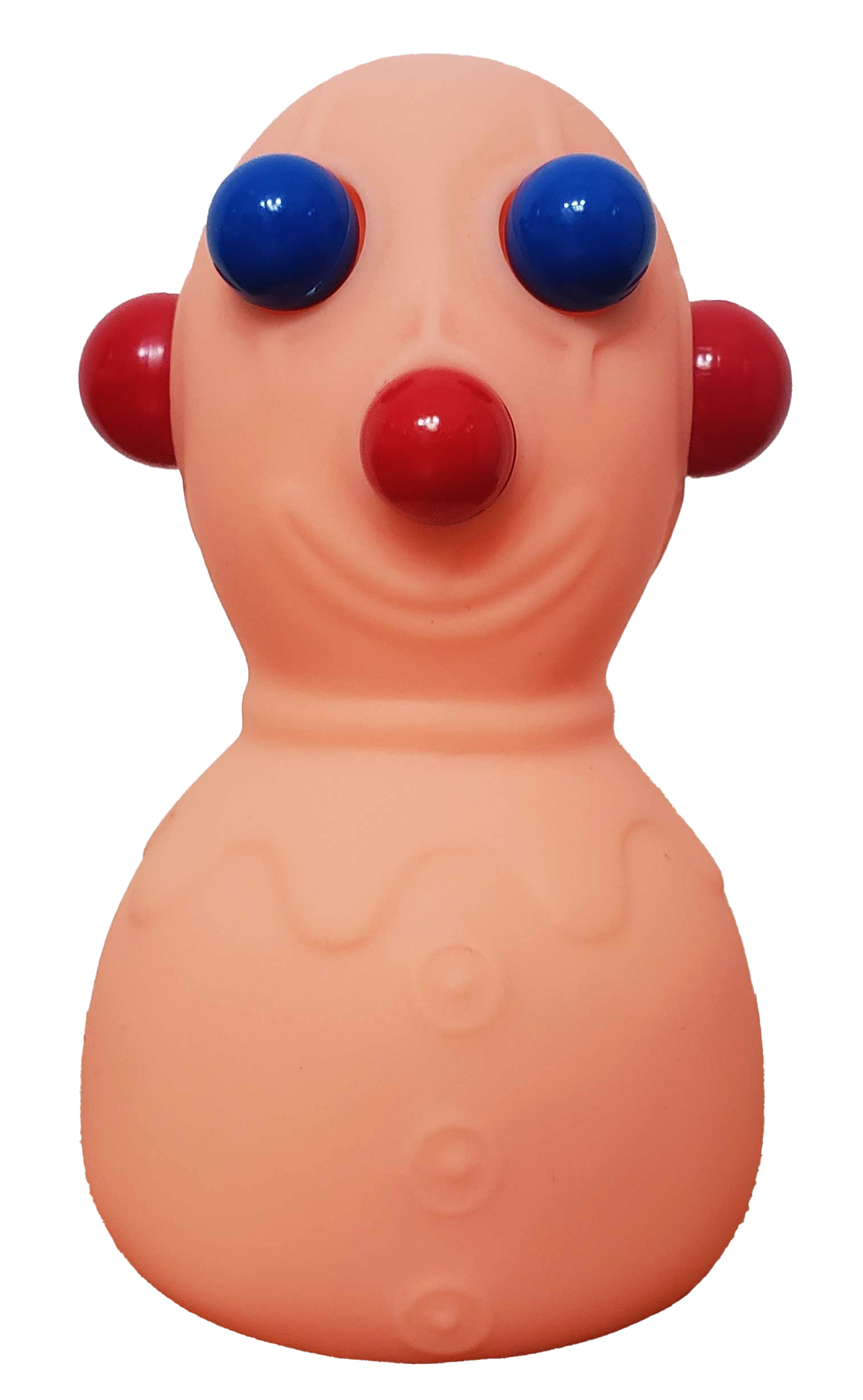
- Panic Pete
- Type: Squeeze toy
- Invented by: John M. Auzin
- Company: Schylling
- Country: United States
- Availability: 1950–present

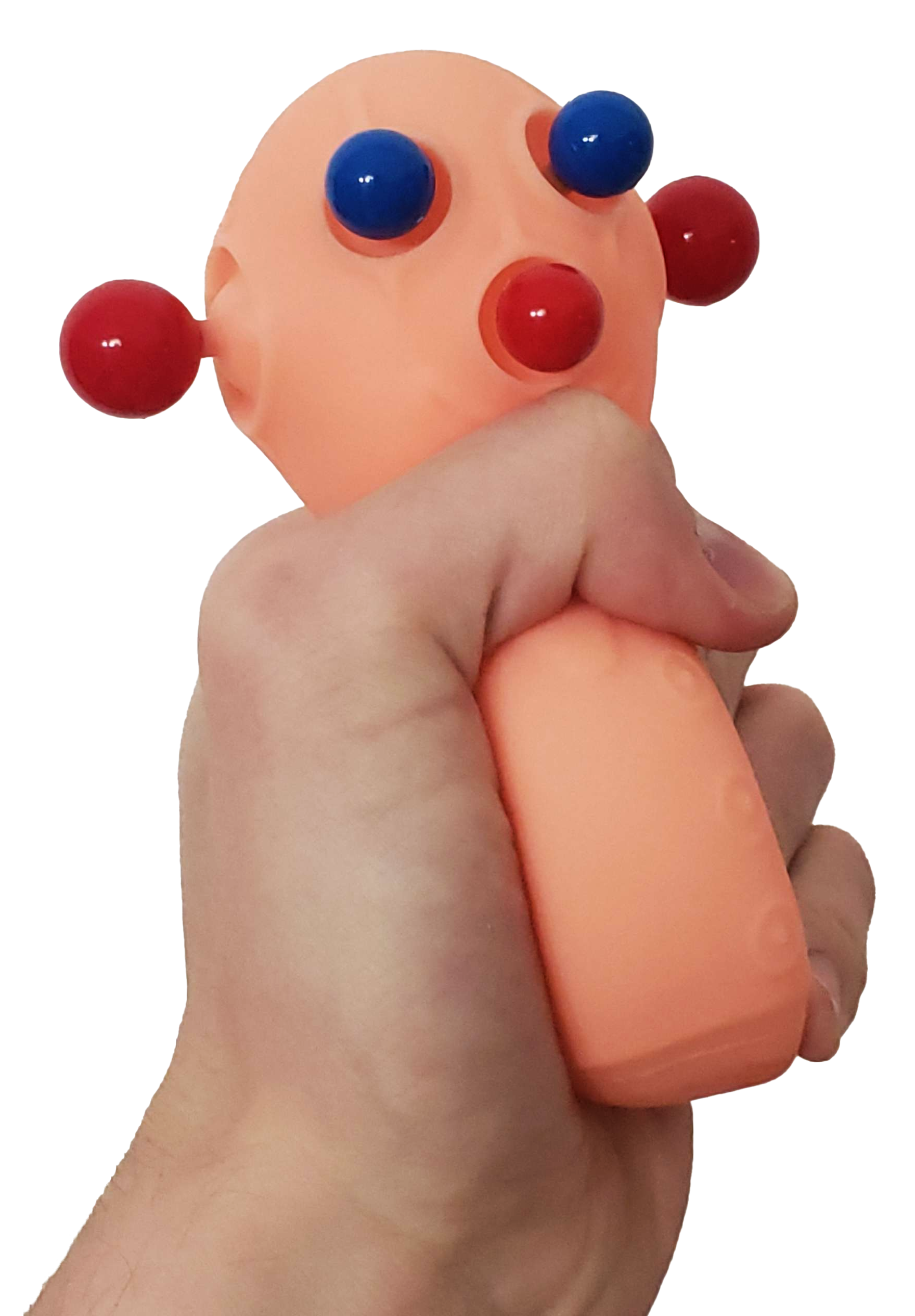
Panic Pete has protruding features when squeezed.

Panic Pete, also known as Jo-Bo, Obie, Gappy, The Martian Popping Doll, The Martian Popping Thing, Popping Martian or Bug-Out Bob is a novelty rubber squeeze toy invented by John M. Auzin.

== History ==
John M. Auzin, born in 1889 in Kandava, Latvia, travelled to various countries during his early years before immigrating to Boston, Massachusetts, at 16. There he took residence in Providence, Rhode Island, and was later employed as a foreman at the Davol Rubber Company, a manufacturer of catheters and other rubber medical equipment. On May 24, 1947, Auzin filed a patent for a "squeezable pop-out action toy" with the ability to have protruding eyes, ears, and mouth when squeezed. Other designs, such as one with teeth or another squirting water, were also included in the patent. Though the patent was not accepted and published until February 9, 1954, the toy was being sold in stores as early as 1950, being named Jo-Bo and manufactured by Blake Industries. Marketed as a kiddy toy and party gimmick, Jo-Bo retailed at 79 cents before being lowered to 69 cents when the factory that produced them expanded in 1954. The Jo-Bo was being cleared from stores by late 1955.

By 1969 the Jo-Bo was being newly distributed by a novelty company called Elbee, located in San Antonio, Texas and manufactured in China. By 1978, the toy was rebranded and redesigned as more alien-like and being named the Obie. This version, being sold by Fort Worth computer company employee David Livingston, would be manufactured and sold from his own partnership between him, his father, and his father in-law and the toys would be assembled by the children of the Abilene State School for the Mentally Retarded. The Obie also had the option to be bought with a wooden base, being called the Executive Obie. Along with that, a green variant of it, resembling a pickle and called the Greenie Weenie, was also being sold in both department stores and novelty stores such as Spencer's Gifts. This toy was later named the Martian Cuke.

Later in 1985, Archie McPhee had started distributing the Obie design instead as The Popping Martian Doll, marketed as a stress toy and manufactured by a company named Aliko in Taiwan. By 1988 the name was changed to the Martian Popping Thing, and by 1991 was redesigned so that the mouth was a nose and the toy resembled a clown. This version was manufactured in Taiwan under that name until 2008 when it was then being distributed simultaneously by Schylling under the name Panic Pete and in 2007 as Bug-Out Bob when being distributed by Toysmith as well as the Popping Martian when being distributed by Tobar.

In 2007 John Livingston under his company JDL Engineering Associates Inc. started originalobie.com, a website dedicated to the sale of the OBIE. The original, as well as a neon version, could be bought here from 2007 to 2017, when the company fully transitioned to selling electronic cigarettes and e-liquid. In 2021 JDL would cease selling e-cigarettes and the website, vaping101.com, would be shut down due to an FDA violation.

By 2009 Schylling redesigned Panic Pete to have plastic balls for his protruding features, rather than having them be part of the rubber mold like previous versions. This is the only design still being manufactured.

In 2022 Schylling introduced a variant of the toy under its NeeDoh line, marketed as NeeDoh Panic Pete. The design remains essentially the same as the standard model, with plastic balls that pop out for the eyes, nose and ears when squeezed, but the NeeDoh version uses bright fluorescent colors and is positioned as an air-filled sensory squish toy. It combines the classic popping mechanism of Panic Pete with the tactile, stress-relieving qualities of the NeeDoh brand.

== In popular culture ==
=== Films ===
- In The Beast Within, the doctor is seen squeezing a toy.
- In The Texas Chainsaw Massacre Part 2, Vanita Brock holds up an Obie/Martian Popping Doll.
- In Bill & Ted's Excellent Adventure, an Obie is seen in Deacon's bedroom.
- In Toys, a gigantic robotic head on the assembly floor of the toy factory resembles a Martian Popping Thing.
- In Jurassic Park, Dennis Nedry uses a Martian Popping Thing as a stress toy.
- In The Mask, a Martian Popping Thing is taken from Stanley Ipkiss when he is apprehended by the police.
- In Small Soldiers, Irwin Mayfair and Larry Benson are seen handling a Panic Pete while listening to Alan Abernathy's voicemail.
- In The Animal, Rob Schneider is seen using a Martian Popping Thing.
- In Robots, one of Ratchet's employees can be seen squeezing a toy of a similar concept.
- In The Boss Baby, a parody of the toy named "Señor Squeeky" is a background prop.

=== Television ===
- In What We Do In The Shadows, Panic Pete is an occasionally used prop.
- In Dirk Gently's Holistic Detective Agency, Mona Wilder shapeshifts into a Panic Pete toy.
- In the Key & Peele sketch The Telemarketer, Colin Valenti squeezes a Panic Pete for the majority of the sketch.
- In The Pee-wee Herman Show: Live Roxy Theatre, Pee-wee Herman uses a Green Weenie as prop comedy.
- In Rugrats, Angelica is seen squeezing a toy resembling Panic Pete.
- In SpongeBob SquarePants, Mr. Krabs uses a blue squeeze toy resembling Panic Pete in the episode "Bossy Boots."
- In Drake & Josh, Crazy Steve is using a Martian Popping Thing as a stress toy.
- In the episode "The Sting" of Futurama, Leela receives a toy resembling a Martian Popping Thing from Fry as a gift, and later is handed it by Hermes.
- In the episode "One Last Job" of Adventure Time, Tiffany is seen squeezing a parody of the Martian Popping Thing.
- In the episode "Anxious Times At Clone High" of Clone High, a Panic Pete toy is seen in a locker.
- In Psych a Panic Pete can often be seen as an office prop and Shawn occasionally squeezes one.
- In A Man on the Inside S02E08 one can be seen on the provost's desk.
- In Pluribus S01E05 (Got Milk), Carol is seen squeezing Panic Pete at the hospital's reception.

=== Video games ===
- In Sam & Max Hit The Road, an object resembling a Panic Pete or Green Weenie is used as a "use" icon.
- In The Binding of Isaac: Rebirth, an item labeled "Squeezy," vaguely resembling Panic Pete, can appear during gameplay.
- In Endacopia, it is found as a "stress toy" in a vending machine and can be acquired while progressing.

=== Comics ===
- In the comic book Robotmen of the Lost Planet, the titular robots have very similar designs compared to the original Jo-Bo.
- A Jo-Bo toy can be seen in both Gothic Blimp Works #2 and Roxy Funnies from Jay Lynch.
- One can be seen in Lenore, the Cute Little Dead Girl , being squeezed by a boy. Lenore asks him where he got one. The boy points to the toy store but Lenore thinks he’s pointing to the pet store where Lenore then squeezes a hamster.

== See also ==
- Stress ball
- Squeaky toy
