= Dirk Gently (TV series) =

2010 British sci-fi TV series

- Genre: Comic science fiction Detective fiction
- Created by: Howard Overman
- Based on: Dirk Gently's Holistic Detective Agency by Douglas Adams
- Written by: Howard Overman; Matt Jones; Jamie Mathieson
- Directed by: Damon Thomas; Tom Shankland
- Starring: Stephen Mangan; Darren Boyd
- Composer: Daniel Pemberton
- Country of origin: United Kingdom
- Original language: English
- No. of series: 1
- No. of episodes: 4 (list of episodes)

Production
- Executive producer: Howard Overman
- Producer: Chris Carey
- Cinematography: Ole Bratt Birkeland
- Editor: Matthew Tabern
- Camera setup: Single-camera
- Running time: 60 minutes
- Production companies: ITV Studios; The Welded Tandem Picture Company

Original release
- Network: BBC Four
- Release: 16 December 2010 – 19 March 2012

Related
- Dirk Gently's Holistic Detective Agency

Dirk Gently is a British comic science fiction detective television series based on characters from the novel Dirk Gently's Holistic Detective Agency by Douglas Adams. The series was created by Howard Overman and stars Stephen Mangan as holistic detective Dirk Gently and Darren Boyd as his sidekick Richard MacDuff. Recurring actors include Helen Baxendale as MacDuff's girlfriend Susan Harmison, Jason Watkins as Dirk's nemesis DI Gilks and Lisa Jackson as Dirk's receptionist Janice Pearce. Unlike most detective series, Dirk Gently features broadly comic touches, and even some science fiction themes such as time travel and artificial intelligence.

Dirk Gently operates his Holistic Detective Agency based on the "fundamental interconnectedness of all things", which relies on random chance methods to uncover connections between seemingly unrelated cases. He claims that he follows the principles of quantum mechanics. Although the majority of his clients suspect he may be a conman, he often produces surprising results. With the help of his assistant/partner, Richard MacDuff, Dirk investigates a number of seemingly unrelated but interconnected cases.

An hour-long pilot episode loosely based on plot elements from Adams' 1987 novel was broadcast on BBC Four on 16 December 2010. Critical reception was generally positive. A full series of three one-hour episodes was subsequently commissioned in March 2011 and was broadcast on BBC Four in March 2012.

The series was produced by ITV Studios and The Welded Tandem Picture Company for BBC Cymru Wales and shot in Bristol. The pilot was written by Howard Overman and directed by Damon Thomas. The full series was written by Overman, Matt Jones and Jamie Mathieson and directed by Tom Shankland. The series along with the pilot episode was released on DVD on 26 March 2012 by ITV Studios Home Entertainment. An original television soundtrack album featuring music from the series composed by Daniel Pemberton was released by 1812 Recordings on 5 March 2012.

== Production ==
=== Background ===
The novel Dirk Gently's Holistic Detective Agency has its origins in the incomplete 1979 Doctor Who television serial Shada, featuring Tom Baker as the Fourth Doctor. Location filming in Cambridge had been completed, but a studio technicians' dispute at the BBC meant that studio segments were not completed, and the serial was never transmitted.

As a result of the serial's cancellation, Adams reused a number of ideas from this script and his other Doctor Who scripts as the basis for a new novel, Dirk Gently's Holistic Detective Agency, published in 1987. Adams published another, The Long Dark Tea-Time of the Soul in 1988 and at the time of his death in 2001 was working on a third installment to be titled The Salmon of Doubt, fragments of which were published posthumously. Each novel features new characters and scenarios, although Dirk (real name Svlad Cjelli), his "ex-secretary" Janice Pearce and Sergeant, later Inspector, Gilks recur in each.

The first Gently novel had previously been adapted into a stage play, Dirk and a BBC Radio 4 series by Above the Title Productions which was first broadcast in October 2007 and featured comedian Harry Enfield in the title role. According to James Donaghy, Douglas Adams was frustrated that his Dirk Gently novels were never adapted for the screen.

=== Announcement ===
During Hitchcon - a Hitchhiker's Guide to the Galaxy convention - Ed Victor, a literary agent who represents Adams's estate announced that a television adaptation of Dirk Gently's Holistic Detective Agency was in production. Stephen Mangan was announced to be playing Gently, with Darren Boyd as MacDuff and Helen Baxendale as Susan. It is the first television adaptation of Adams' Dirk Gently series, although characters from the books had appeared in a 1992 episode of The South Bank Show.

Shooting on the pilot commenced early in October 2010 in Bristol. The director was Damon Thomas and the producer was Chris Carey. Although it was commissioned by the BBC, it was produced by ITV Studios with The Welded Tandem Picture Company. The pilot was first broadcast on BBC Four on 16 December 2010 and was repeated a number of times during the next month.

The pilot gained a commission on 31 March 2011 for a three-part series of one hour-long episodes broadcast on BBC Four in March 2012. The series is the first continuing drama series commissioned by BBC Four.

=== Adaptation ===
The screenplay of the pilot by Howard Overman is not a direct adaptation of the novel, but uses certain characters and situations from the novel to form the basis of a new drama centred on Dirk. Speaking about his interpretation, Howard Overman stated in an interview with Benji Wilson "I'm not even going to try to adapt the book: you can't adapt this story. Especially not on a BBC Four budget. We made the deliberate decision not to do a straight translation of the books. If we'd done that the fans would have felt badly let down, because you can never portray that world on the screen as well as it's been done in people's own imaginations...If you just do a straight adaptation like The Hitchhiker's Guide film, people are always going to be quite brutal about it because it's never going to live up to their expectations."

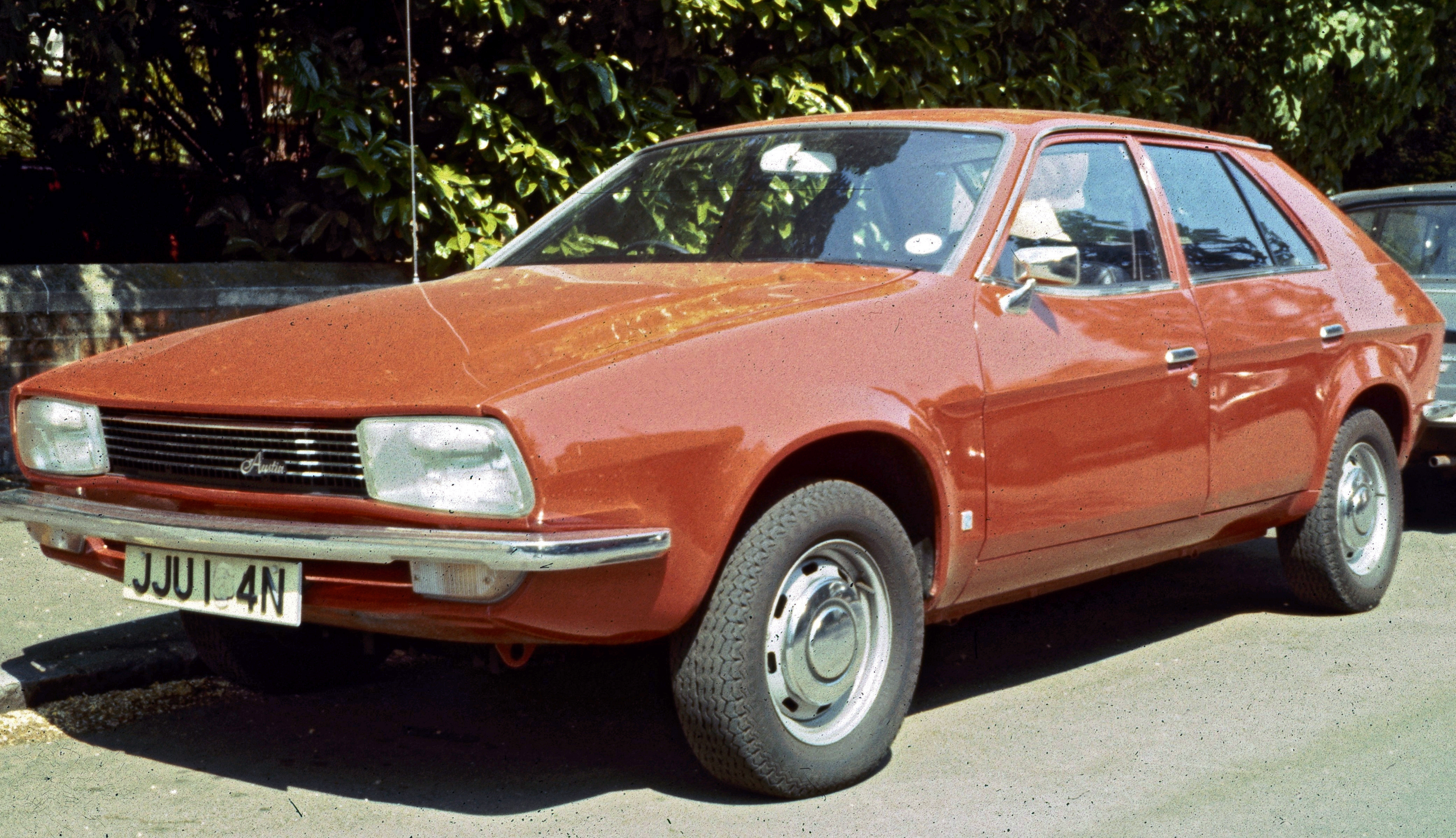
Dirk drives an old brown Princess in the production.

Stephen Mangan, writing a BBC blog on the programme stated "In my opinion, Dirk Gently's Holistic Detective Agency and The Long Dark Tea-Time of the Soul are unfilmable as written...too much happens, there are too many ideas".

The pilot concentrates on two relatively minor plot strands in Dirk Gently's Holistic Detective Agency: the disappearance of a cat, and the simultaneous disappearance of billionaire Gordon Way. Although time travel is involved in the solution, the novel's entire St Cedd's College / Electric Monk / Coleridge strand is omitted, although key words relating to these elements do appear on Dirk's whiteboard when it is first seen, though they are never subsequently referred to. Other elements from the book, such as the trapped sofa, are also absent and the setting is updated to 2010, with email and voicemail replacing the answering machine messages in the book. There are changes to the characters too, one notable one being that Susan is Gordon's ex-girlfriend rather than his sister.

Several additional elements from Adams' novels, in particular St Cedd's College, were later to appear in the full series. Interviewed about the series, Mangan noted that "All three episodes are very different in tone and you get a different Dirk with each one...He's on the run from the police in one of them and in another there's a bit of romance in the air, which for Dirk is a surprise because he's probably the most asexual character on TV... There seems to be a vogue for dark, realistic, gritty detective series, apart from perhaps Sherlock. Dirk has so much humour in it. How many other detectives mix detection with quantum mechanics or drive a 30-year-old brown Austin Leyland Princess?"

Each episode of series one was written by different writers, who are mostly known for their contributions to science fiction and fantasy programmes; series creator Howard Overman also created Misfits and has written for Merlin, Matt Jones has previously written the Doctor Who stories "The Impossible Planet"/"The Satan Pit" and Jamie Mathieson wrote the film Frequently Asked Questions About Time Travel and has written scripts for Being Human and Doctor Who.

=== Cast ===
Stephen Mangan, best known for his role in the television series Green Wing, was cast in the main role as holistic detective Dirk Gently. Mangan already knew the novel and the author's works, stating in a press release "I've been a fan of Douglas Adams ever since the Hitchhiker's radio series which I used to record as a child and listen to over and over again in my bedroom. It's such a thrill to now be playing one of his brilliant characters. Dirk is a chaotic, anarchic force of nature with a totally unique take on the world. He is described as 'lazy, untidy, dismissive and unreliable'. I've absolutely no idea why they thought I'd be right for the role." Cast alongside him were Darren Boyd and Helen Baxendale, both of whom had previously worked with Mangan in Green Wing and Adrian Mole: The Cappuccino Years respectively. Darren Boyd and Helen Baxendale returned for the full series, with the character of Richard MacDuff becoming Dirk's "partner/assistant" for each of the episodes. Other regular cast members are Jason Watkins as Detective Inspector Gilks and Lisa Jackson as Dirk's secretary Janice Pearce.

The programme pilot featured appearances from Doreen Mantle, Anthony Howell, Miles Richardson, Billy Boyle. Episode one saw guest appearances by Paul Ritter, Cosima Shaw, Ken Collard, Colin McFarlane and Miranda Raison. Episode two featured roles for Bill Paterson, Sylvestra Le Touzel, Lydia Wilson, Andrew Leung, Will Sharpe and Bethan Hanks. Episode three features Lisa Dillon and Tony Pitts.

=== Filming ===
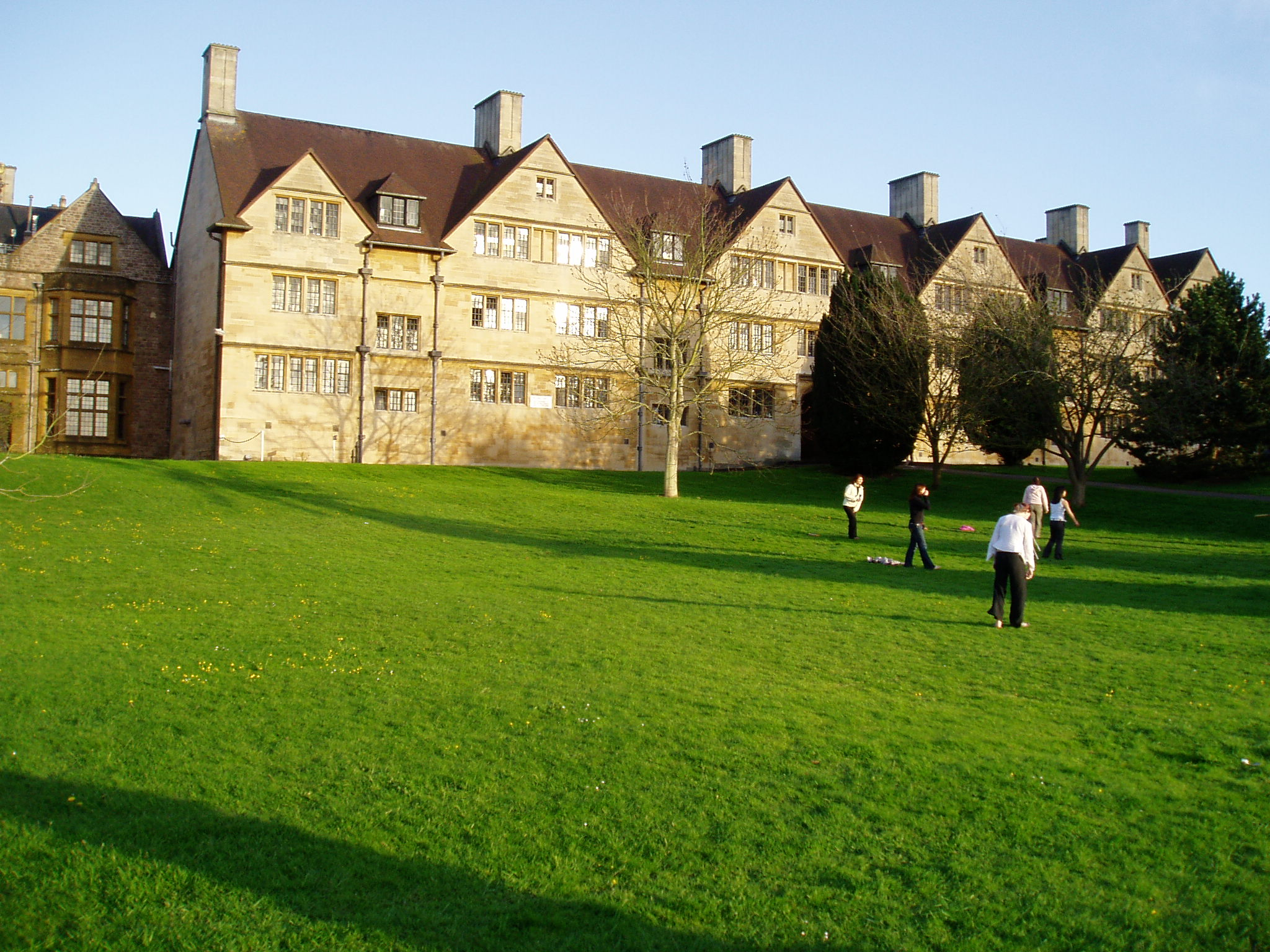
Wills Hall at the University of Bristol was used as the fictional St. Cedd's College, Cambridge.

Although the series is set in the London boroughs of Camden Town and Islington, the series was shot entirely in Bristol. Areas and buildings featured in the programme included the Guildhall, the Bottle Yard, St Thomas Street and the Greenbank area. The second series episode also featured extensive filming around the University of Bristol, with Wills Hall doubling as the fictional Cambridge College St. Cedd's.

The production's location manager, Rob Champion, noted that each location had to be chosen carefully to avoid featured giveaway clues to Bristol, in particular any building made of the local building material, limestone. He noted that "Episode 2 was the greatest challenge as it included two days material in a robotic laboratory. Bristol has such a thing...a joint venture between the two universities, with a very helpful professor, but its landlord was an American corporation with the most unimaginably anal restrictions on access. They basically didn't want us there and took the best part of two weeks to say so...We eventually settled upon a brand new building at the Bristol-Bath Science Park where they could not have been more helpful. All this on a BBC4 budget."

=== Music ===
The series's soundtrack was composed by Daniel Pemberton. In creating the distinctive sound for the main titles and incidental music, Pemberton made use of a Marxophone, a zither that is a cross between a hammered dulcimer and a piano. These instruments were produced in America between 1927 and 1972. The soundtrack also mixes in a harpsichord, synth, bass guitar and drums. A soundtrack album featuring music from the series was released by 1812 Recordings on 5 March 2012.

== Premise ==
Dirk Gently (real name Svlad Cjelli) operates a Holistic Detective Agency based on the "fundamental interconnectedness of all things". To solve cases, Dirk relies on random chance methods for example "Zen navigation" (following people or vehicles who look like they know where they are going, in the hope that while you might not get to where you were originally headed, you might still end up somewhere you needed to be, even if you didn't originally know you needed to be there) or throwing a dart at a board of words to select the direction of his detection. By following up on apparently random occurrences and whims, Dirk discovers connections between seemingly unrelated cases and often produces surprising results. He claims that he follows the principles of quantum mechanics (although it is implied when he speaks to an expert in these fields that he doesn't really understand them); most people suspect he is just a conman and he rarely gets paid by clients and is therefore in almost permanent financial difficulty.

In the pilot episode, Dirk bumps into a former university friend, Richard MacDuff, who has been made redundant from a job at an electricity board, and takes on a case for him. During the course of his investigation, Dirk hypnotises MacDuff and persuades him into investing his £20,000 redundancy money in his failing detective agency. MacDuff therefore becomes Dirk's partner in the business and "assistant" on investigations. Richard MacDuff's girlfriend, Dr Susan Harmison, was also at university with the pair and is deeply sceptical about Dirk's abilities. Also present at the Agency is Dirk's receptionist Janice Pearce, whom Dirk has not paid for years and who therefore refuses to do any work.

== Episodes ==
=== Pilot (2010) ===
Title	Directed by	Written by	Original release date	UK viewers
"Pilot"	Damon Thomas	Howard Overman	16 December 2010	943,000
When Dirk Gently sets out to solve an apparently simple and harmless disappearance of a cat from an old lady's house, he unwittingly uncovers a double murder which, in turn, leads to a host of even more extraordinary events.

=== Season 1 (2012) ===
No.	Title	Directed by	Written by	Original release date	UK viewers
1	"Episode 1"	Tom Shankland	Howard Overman	5 March 2012	844,000
Dirk discovers the connection between two unrelated cases - a client who believes people from the Pentagon are trying to kill him and another whose horoscopes appear to be coming true. The episode features Miranda Raison.
2	"Episode 2"	Tom Shankland	Matt Jones	12 March 2012	561,000
Dirk is called back to his old university to protect a valuable robot but within 24 hours it has been stolen and a dead body discovered, with Dirk and MacDuff the prime suspects.
3	"Episode 3"	Tom Shankland	Jamie Mathieson	19 March 2012	592,000
Dirk’s old clients are being randomly murdered with Dirk as the only link. Rather than talk to the police, Dirk elects to leave the country but is waylaid by a series of seemingly unconnected events.

== Reception ==
=== Pilot ===
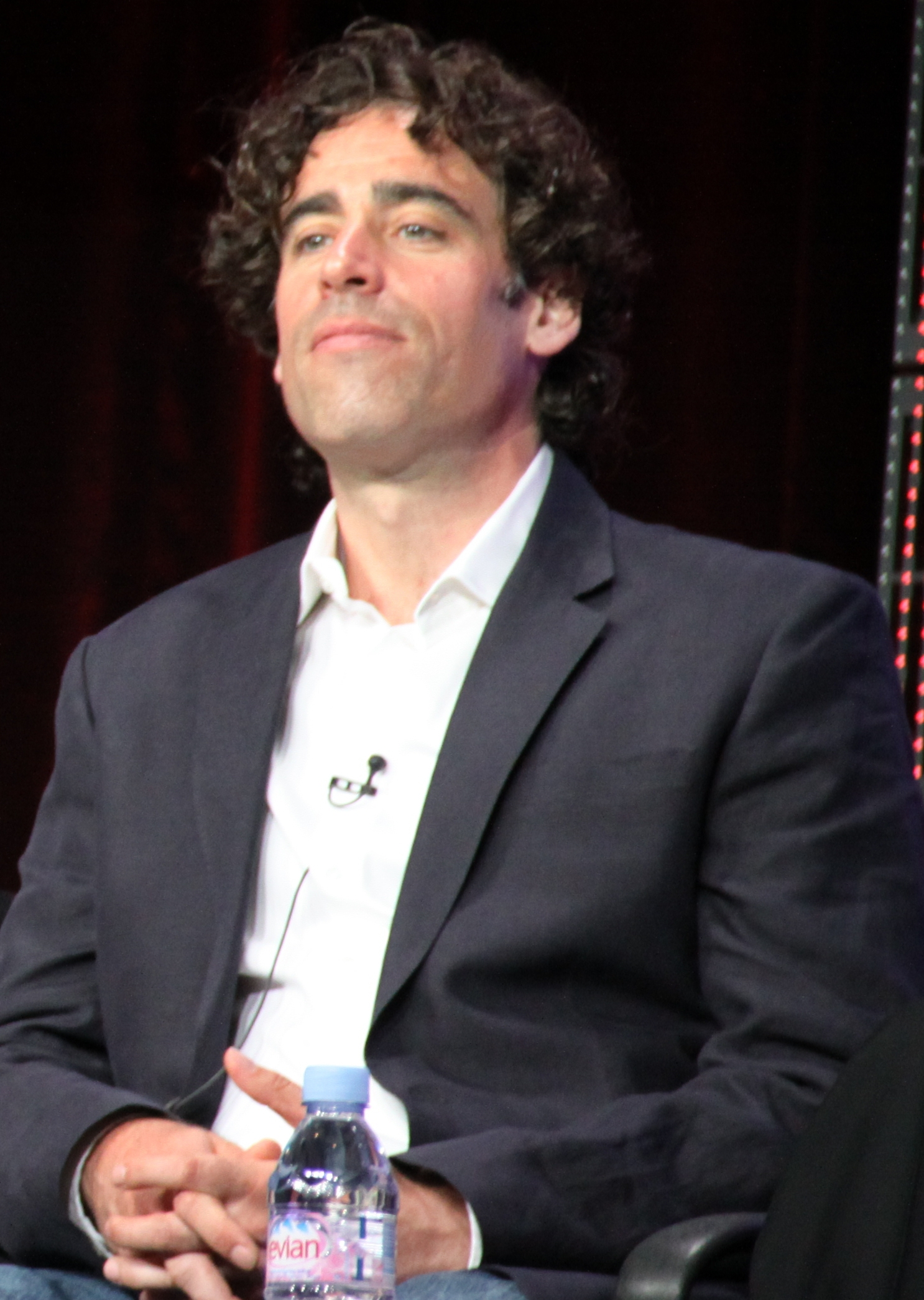
Stephen Mangan plays the title holistic detective in the series.

The pilot episode gained 1.1m viewers (3.9% share) on BBC Four, which was over three times the channel's slot average. Critical reception for the pilot was largely positive. Several mentioned that it was only a loose adaptation of the novel, although the general consensus was that the essence of the original was maintained. Sam Wollaston in The Guardian stated "Coming to it fresh, it's a neat story about aforementioned missing cat and time travel, with a smattering of quantum physics and the fundamental connectedness of things. With a lovely performance from Doreen Mantle as the old lady/murderer. Stephen Mangan's good in the title role, too – a teeny bit irritating perhaps, but then Mangan is a teeny bit irritating. So is Dirk Gently, though – it's perfect. Funny too. Quite funny." James Donaghy, also writing in The Guardian stated "Personally I hope Dirk Gently gets made into a full series. The programme shows promising glimpses, has a strong cast and Misfits already proves Overman can write. And a BBC4 adaptation feels like a good fit – Gently being exactly the kind of playground-of-the-imagination curio the BBC made its name indulging."

The Independent published two reviews. Alice-Azania Jarvis was extremely positive, writing "...there wasn't very much you could fault about the production at all. Right down to the quirky camerawork and youthful, poppy soundtrack (who would have thought the Hoosiers could be so right in any situation?), the director, Damon Thomas, got it pretty spot-on. The result was a pleasingly festive-feeling adventure; part Wallace and Gromit, part Doctor Who, part The Secret Seven. And the best thing? There wasn't a Christmas tree in sight. Douglas Adams once claimed that Gently would make a better film character than his more famous hero, Arthur Dent. Based on last night's experience, he may well have been right." John Walsh's review for The Independent was cooler about the adaptation, although he praised Mangan's performance: "Given the talent and style on display, it should have been a scream. In fact it all seemed a little moth-eaten. Though set in the modern day, it was staggeringly old-fashioned...You could overlook these faults, however, for the joy of Stephen Mangan's performance as the titular gumshoe. With his alarmed-spaniel eyes and jutting-jawed stroppiness, his geography teacher elbow-patches and Medusan hair, he radiates mess...His ineptness as a sleuth provided some fine comic moments.

Paul Whitelaw in Metro was also positive, although he noted "At times it felt forced, with a sense of trying slightly too hard when a touch more subtlety would have brought out the essential Adamsian eccentricity." Dan Owen of Obsessed with Film noted that the adaptation played with the idea of inexplicable situations: "Purists may grumble this isn't the Dirk Gently they wanted to see, but it's more accessible and practicable. And while Dirk Gently is certainly another gimmicky detective series (yawn), its details are unique and engrossing enough to shrug off the genre's clichés. In some ways it's a pastiche of whodunits, taking the genre's often tenuous explanations to an outrageous extreme."

Paul Whitelaw in The Scotsman noted that "Although Adams's more ambitious concepts are sidelined in favour of a more prosaic - if nonetheless enjoyable - sci-fi mystery, Overman captures at least some of the wit and whimsy of his distinctive comic voice" going on to suggest "This modestly-budgeted pilot suggests potential for a series, so the deviation from Adams's originals makes sense. It also adds yet another very British oddball to the pantheon currently occupied by Doctor Who and Sherlock."

=== Series One ===
Critical opinion to the full series was mildly positive. The adaptation from the Adams' novels was the focus of several reviews. Jane Simon, writing in The Mirror stated "It's just a shame creator Douglas Adams isn't around to see how Howard Overman has transferred Dirk to the screen. He'd definitely approve." Mark Braxton in the Radio Times likewise agreed that "Overman has plucked the comic essence of Adams from his novel...and worked it into a digestible, enjoyably eccentric format."

Stuart Jeffries in The Guardian, meanwhile, found a comparison between the tone of the series and 1960s spy/detective capers; "Never since The Avengers has there been anything so unremittingly silly on British television as Dirk Gently...Dainty harpsichord music tells us we're back in an era of TV misrule, in whose glory days John Steed, Mrs Peel and Randall and Hopkirk (Deceased) played fast and loose with viewers' intelligences."

AA Gill, who had previously expressed a dislike for the source novel when discussing the pilot episode was less complimentary, writing in the Sunday Times on 11 March 2012 "Who'd have guessed that this would ever get recommissioned?...It has to get a nomination as the greatest waste of the most talent for the least visible purpose or reward." Others critics complained that the series was not an exact adaptation of the novels. Nigel Farndale in The Telegraph stated "I struggled with Dirk Gently...It had nothing to do with Stephen Mangan's considerable comedic talents, still less with Darren Boyd who plays MacDuff, the Dr Watson to Dirk's Holmes. It is more to do with my devotion to Douglas Adams, upon whose comic novel this series is based...in Douglas Adams, 90 per cent of the pleasure is in the prose, the narration, the felicities of language."

Tom Sutcliffe in The Independent felt that the programme's qualities were "spread a little too thinly over a nonsensical thriller plot' and that "laughs... were far too widely spaced in a script that could have done with a lot more editing."

Several critics compared the production with the big-budget BBC One detective series "Sherlock", the second series of which was broadcast in January 2012. Writing in Metro, Keith Watson said "There's no doubt Sherlock has raised the detecting duo bar on TV...it's more than a match for Sherlock on the dialogue front, neatly catching the surreal humour that was the Adams trademark...but there was no disguising the fact that Dirk Gently was a five-star script being filmed on a one-star budget, making it look like a designer label knockoff when set against the production values lavished on Sherlock."

The first episode had 737,000 viewers and a 3% audience share. Series one, including the pilot episode, was released on DVD on 26 March 2012 by ITV Studios Home Entertainment.

=== Cancellation ===
It was announced on 28 May 2012 that no further episodes had been commissioned. Stephen Mangan wrote on Twitter: "It gives me no pleasure whatsoever to report that the BBC have decided not to make any more Dirk Gently." An article in the Metro noted that after Mangan's tweet, the show quickly became one of the top trending topics in the UK and an online petition was set up opposing the decision. A BBC spokesman stated that as a result of the cuts initiated by the "Delivering Quality First" process, BBC Four is concentrating funds on purchasing imported shows: "We've loved having Dirk on the channel but the licence fee freeze means less British drama on BBC Four...In future we will focus on the best dramas from around the globe, like The Killing and Borgen, whilst BBC One and BBC Two become the main homes of original British drama."
