= Samuel Barnett (actor) =

English actor (born 1980)

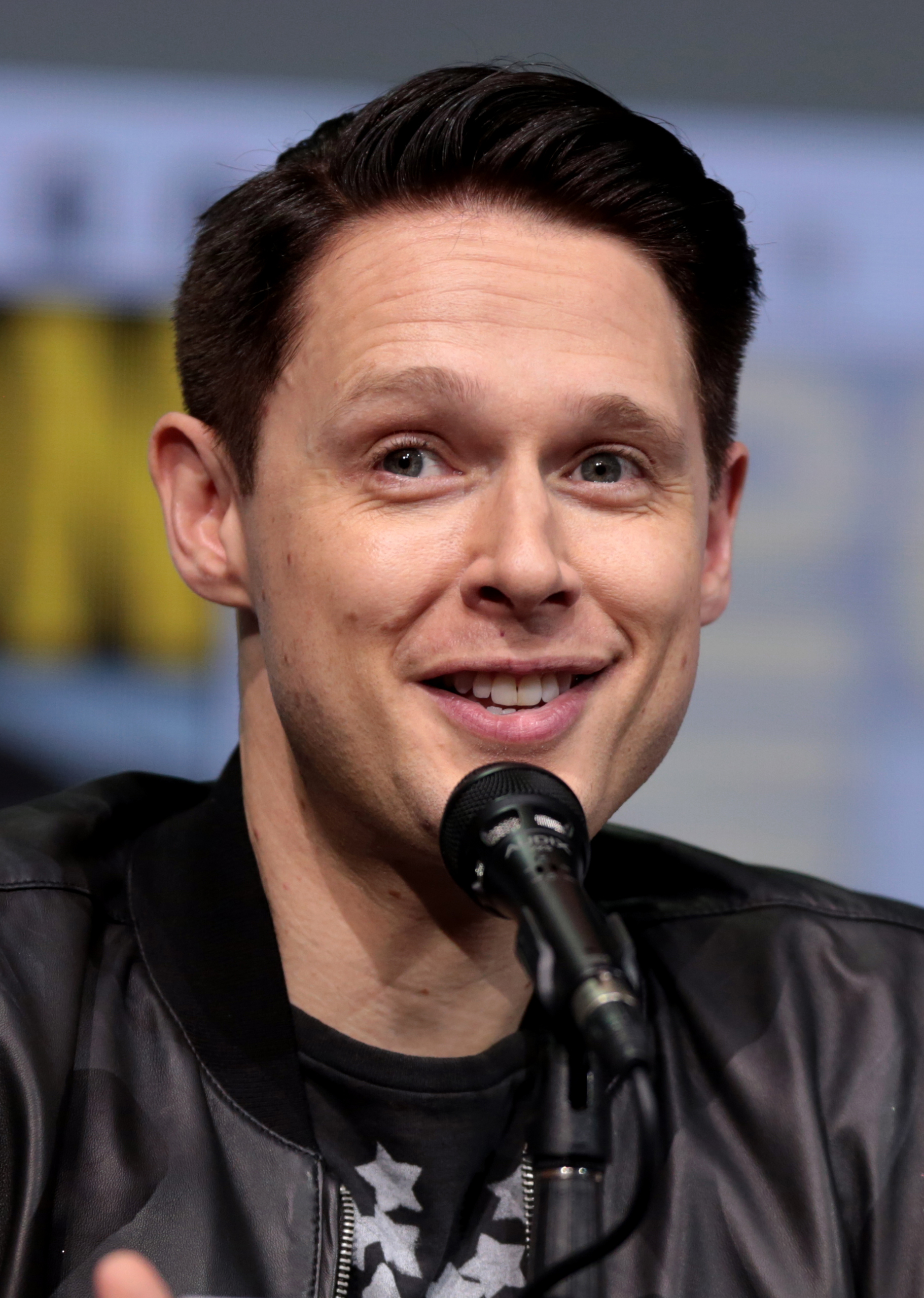
- Barnett at the 2017 San Diego Comic-Con
- Born: 25 April 1980 (age 46); Whitby, North Yorkshire, England
- Education: London Academy of Music and Dramatic Art
- Occupation: Actor
- Years active: 2001–present
- Partner: Adam Penford

Samuel Barnett (born 25 April 1980) is an English actor. He has performed on stage, film, television and radio and achieved recognition for his work on the stage and film versions of The History Boys by Alan Bennett. His television performances include roles in the BBC comedy Twenty Twelve and in the Showtime drama Penny Dreadful. He played the lead role of Dirk Gently in Dirk Gently's Holistic Detective Agency, the 2016 BBC America adaptation of the book series by Douglas Adams.

== Early life ==
Barnett was born in Whitby, North Yorkshire, on 25 April 1980. He has four siblings. His mother comes from a Quaker background while his father was descended from Polish Jews. He started performing at an early age before moving to London to study acting at the London Academy of Music and Dramatic Art (LAMDA).

== Career ==
Barnett appeared in the original London stage production of Alan Bennett's 2004 play The History Boys, as well as in the New York, Sydney, Wellington and Hong Kong productions and radio and film versions of the play. He had been involved in The History Boys from its very first reading.

In 2009 Barnett played John Everett Millais in the BBC series Desperate Romantics and Joseph Severn in the film Bright Star. He appeared at the National Theatre in Women Beware Women by Thomas Middleton, which ran from 20 April to 4 July 2010. From July 2012 he appeared in an all-male-cast as Queen Elizabeth in Shakespeare's Richard III at Shakespeare's Globe in London alongside Mark Rylance in the title role, also playing the role of Sebastian in Twelfth Night. The production transferred to the Apollo Theatre in the West End, opening on 2 November 2012 and running for a limited engagement. Both Twelfth Night and Richard III transferred to Broadway in 2013 and played at the Belasco Theatre until February 2014. In the Broadway productions Barnett reprised his role as Elizabeth Woodville in Richard III and took on the role of Viola (previously played by Johnny Flynn in London) in Twelfth Night. In July 2018 Barnett reunited with History Boys playwright Alan Bennett and co-star Sacha Dhawan for Bennett's new play, Allelujah!, at the Bridge Theatre.

In 2022 at the Edinburgh Fringe, Barnett performed a one-man show Feeling Afraid as If Something Terrible Is Going to Happen written by Marcelo dos Santos. In late 2023, Barnett performed this at the Bush Theatre in London.

== Accolades and honours ==
Barnett was nominated for the Evening Standard Theatre Award as Most Promising Newcomer for his role in The Marriage of Figaro in 2002. He won Best Newcomer and Best Supporting Actor in a play at the Whatsonstage.com Theatregoers Choice Awards for his work on the original production of The History Boys. He was nominated for the 2005 Laurence Olivier Award for Best Performance in a Supporting Role. He won a Drama Desk Award and was nominated for a Tony Award for his work on the Broadway production.

Barnett was nominated for the 2006 British Independent Film Award for Most Promising Newcomer (On Screen) for his work on the film version of The History Boys.

In 2014 Barnett received a nomination for a Tony Award for Best Actor in a Play for his work in Twelfth Night.

In 2022 Barnett received the Stage Edinburgh Award for excellence in acting for his role in the solo-show Feeling Afraid As If Something Terrible Is Going To Happen.

== Personal life ==
Barnett is gay and in a relationship with theatre director Adam Penford. In 2020 his father died from COVID-19.

== Acting credits ==
=== Theatre ===
| Year | Title | Role | Venue |
|---|---|---|---|
| 2002 | The Accrington Pals | Reggie | Minerva Theatre, Chichester |
| 2002 | The Marriage of Figaro | Cherubino | Royal Exchange Theatre, Manchester |
| 2003–2004 | His Dark Materials | Pantalaimon | Olivier Theatre, Royal National Theatre, South Bank |
| 2004–2006 | The History Boys | Posner | Lyttelton Theatre, Royal National Theatre, South Bank (2004–2005); Lyric Theatre, The Hong Kong Academy for Performing Arts (2006); St. James Theatre, Wellington (2006); Sydney Theatre, Sydney (2006); Broadhurst Theatre, Broadway (2006) |
| 2005 | When You Cure Me | Peter | Bush Theatre, London |
| 2007–2008 | Dealer's Choice | Carl | Menier Chocolate Factory and Trafalgar Studios, London |
| 2010 | The Whisky Taster | Barney | Bush Theatre, London |
| 2010 | The Man | Man | Finborough Theatre, London |
| 2010 | Women Beware Women | Leantio | Olivier Theatre, Royal National Theatre, South Bank |
| 2011 | Rosencrantz and Guildenstern are Dead | Rosencrantz | Chichester Festival Theatre and Theatre Royal Haymarket |
| 2011 | 66 Books | St. Paul | Bush Theatre, London |
| 2012 | The Way of the World | Witwoud | Crucible Theatre, Sheffield |
| 2012 | Richard III | Elizabeth Woodville | Shakespeare's Globe and Apollo Theatre, London |
| 2012 | Twelfth Night | Sebastian | Shakespeare's Globe and Apollo Theatre, London |
| 2013–2014 | Richard III | Elizabeth Woodville | Belasco Theatre, Broadway |
| 2013–2014 | Twelfth Night | Viola | Belasco Theatre, Broadway |
| 2015 | The Beaux' Stratagem | Aimwell | Olivier Theatre, Royal National Theatre, South Bank |
| 2018 | Allelujah! | Colin | Bridge Theatre, |
| 2018 | Kiss of the Spider Woman | Molina | Menier Chocolate Factory, London |
| 2021 | Medium: A Magical Reckoning | | |
| 2022 | Straight Line Crazy | Ariel Porter | Bridge Theatre |
| 2022 | Feeling Afraid As If Something Terrible Is Going To Happen | The Comedian | Roundabout Theatre @ Summerhall, Edinburgh Festival |
| 2023 | Rock Follies (adaptation of the TV series) | Harry | Chichester Festival Theatre |
| 2023 | Feeling Afraid As If Something Terrible Is Going To Happen | The Comedian | Bush Theatre |
| 2024 | Ben and Imo | Ben | Swan Theatre, Stratford-upon-Avon |
| 2025 | The Last Stand of Mrs. Mary Whitehouse | Various | Nottingham Playhouse |
| 2026 | Pride | Jonathan | National Theatre |

=== Television ===
| Year | Title | Role | Network | Notes |
|---|---|---|---|---|
| 2001 | Coupling | Sex Shop Assistant | BBC | Episode: "My Dinner in Hell" |
| 2002 | The Inspector Lynley Mysteries | Brian Byrne | BBC | Episode: "Well-Schooled in Murder" |
| 2002–2003 | Strange | Doddington | BBC | |
| 2003 | Doctors | Charlie Ambrose | BBC | Episode: "All an Illusion" |
| 2003 | The Royal | Joe Steeples | ITV | Episode: "Poison" |
| 2006 | American Experience | Philip Hamilton's schoolmate | PBS | Episode: "Alexander Hamilton" |
| 2007 | Wilfred Owen: A Remembrance Tale | Wilfred Owen | BBC | |
| 2007 | John Adams | Thomas Boylston Adams | HBO | |
| 2008 | Beautiful People | Adult Simon Doonan / Narrator | BBC | |
| 2008 | Crooked House | Billy | BBC | |
| 2009 | Desperate Romantics | John Millais | BBC | |
| 2009 | Beautiful People: Series 2 | Adult Simon Doonan / Narrator | BBC | |
| 2009 | Agatha Christie's Marple | Sergeant Tiddler | ITV | Episode: "The Mirror Crack'd from Side to Side" |
| 2011 | Two Pints of Lager and a Packet of Crisps | Leonard | BBC | |
| 2011 | Shakespeare in Italy | Romeo Montague | BBC | |
| 2012 | Twenty Twelve | Danny | BBC | |
| 2015 | Vicious | Young Stuart | ITV | |
| 2015 | Not Safe for Work | Nathanial | Channel 4 | |
| 2016 | Endeavour | Anthony Donn | ITV | |
| 2016 | Penny Dreadful | Renfield | Showtime | 7 episodes |
| 2016–2017 | Dirk Gently's Holistic Detective Agency | Dirk Gently | BBC America | Main role |
| 2021 | Four Lives | Ryan Edwards | BBC | |
| 2022 | Murder in Provence | Didier Laurent | ITV | |
| 2022 | Cyberpunk: Edgerunners | Delamain AI (voice) | Netflix | |
| 2026 | Black Doves | Jerry | Netflix | Series 2 |

=== Film ===
| Year | Title | Role |
|---|---|---|
| 2005 | Mrs Henderson Presents | Paul |
| 2006 | The History Boys | Posner |
| 2009 | Bright Star | Joseph Severn |
| 2012 | Love Tomorrow | Cal |
| 2015 | Jupiter Ascending | Advocate Bob |
| 2015 | The Lady in the Van | Out of work actor |
| 2020 | The Act | Matthews |
| 2023 | Lee | Cecil Beaton |

=== Radio ===
| Year | Title | Role | Station | Notes |
|---|---|---|---|---|
| 2004 | Fighting for Words | Thomas Moynihan | BBC Radio 4 | |
| 2005 | The History Boys | Posner | BBC Radio 3 | |
| 2005 | When You Cure Me | Peter | BBC Radio 3 | |
| 2007 | Down and Out in Paris and London | George Orwell | BBC Radio 4 | |
| 2008 | The Babington Plot | Thomas Salisbury | BBC Radio 4 | |
| 2009 | The Quest | Mordred | BBC Radio 4 | |
| 2009 | Joan of Arc, and How She Became a Saint | Dauphin of France | BBC Radio 4 | |
| 2009 | Turing's Test | Alan Turing | Made in Manchester | |
| 2010 | Spitfire | Tony | BBC Radio 4 | |
| 2010 | Translations | Yolland | BBC Radio 4 | |
| 2010 | I, Claudius | Caligula | BBC Radio 4 | |
| 2010 | A Tiny Bit Marvellous | Oscar | BBC Radio 4 | |
| 2011 | Wuthering Heights | Edgar Linton / Linton Heathcliff | BBC Radio 3 | |
| 2011 | My Week with Marilyn | Colin Clark (narrator) | BBC Radio 4 | |
| 2012 | Dickens' London | Charles Dickens | BBC Radio 4 | |
| 2012 | The Voysey Inheritance | Edward Voysey | BBC Radio 3 | |
| 2013 | Tosca's Kiss | Rospo | BBC Radio 3 | |
| 2013 | Jill | John Kemp | BBC Radio 4 | |
| 2013 | Denmark Hill | Charles | BBC Radio 4 | |
| 2013 | Sometimes into the Arms of God | Cecil Beaton | BBC Radio 4 | |
| 2018 | The Case of Charles Dexter Ward | Charles Dexter Ward | BBC Radio 4 | |
| 2024 | Dickensian: Little Dorrit | Arthur Clennam | BBC Radio 4 | 3 episodes |

=== Audio drama ===
| Year | Title | Role | Company |
|---|---|---|---|
| 2009 | Doctor Who: The Beast of Orlok | Hans | Big Finish |
| 2016 | Doctor Who: Nightshade | Robin Yeadon | Big Finish |
| 2016 | The Confessions of Dorian Gray | Staurt Knight | Big Finish |
| 2016– | Torchwood | Norton Folgate | Big Finish |
| 2017 | Hamlet | Laertes | Big Finish |
| 2017–2018 | Cicero | Cicero | Big Finish |
| 2019 | Doctor Who: Tartarus | Cicero | Big Finish |

=== Soundtrack ===
| Year | Title | Notes |
|---|---|---|
| 2006 | The History Boys | Performer: "L'Accordéoniste", "Bewitched", "Bye Bye Blackbird" |

=== Video games ===
| Year | Title | Role | Notes |
|---|---|---|---|
| 2020 | Amnesia: Rebirth | Richard Fairchild | Voice |
| 2020 | Cyberpunk 2077 | Delamain AI | Voice |
| 2020 | Xenoblade Chronicles: Definitive Edition | Gael'gar | Voice |
| 2022 | Elden Ring | Brother Corhyn | Voice |
