= Dirk Gently =

Fictional character by Douglas Adams

Rendition of Dirk Gently's office plate

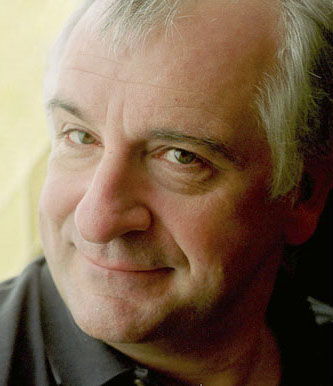
Douglas Adams, creator of Dirk Gently

Dirk Gently (born Svlad Cjelli, also known as Dirk Cjelli) is a fictional character created by English writer Douglas Adams and featured in the books Dirk Gently's Holistic Detective Agency, The Long Dark Tea-Time of the Soul and The Salmon of Doubt. He is portrayed as a pudgy man who normally wears a heavy old light-brown suit, red checked shirt with a green striped tie, long leather coat, a red hat, and thick metal-rimmed spectacles.

"Dirk Gently" is not the character's real name. It is noted early on in the first book that it is a pseudonym for "Svlad Cjelli". Dirk himself states that the name has a "Scottish dagger feel" to it.

== Holistic detective ==
Dirk bills himself as a "holistic detective" who makes use of "the fundamental interconnectedness of all things" to solve the whole crime, and find the whole person. This involves running up large expense accounts and then claiming that every item (such as needing to go to a tropical beach in the Bahamas for three weeks) was, as a consequence of this "fundamental interconnectedness", actually a vital part of the investigation. Challenged on this point in the first novel, he claims that he cannot be considered to have ripped anybody off, because none of his clients have ever paid him. His office is supposed to be located at 33a Peckender St. N1 London. As an investigator whose cases often take a paranormal twist, he challenges the notion that – as presented by Sherlock Holmes – "when you have eliminated the impossible, whatever remains, however improbable, must be the truth", as sometimes the impossible explanation makes more sense. To prove this, Dirk cites as an example an incident where a young girl is somehow reciting the stock market prices exactly as they change but twenty-four hours earlier. As Dirk describes it, it is impossible that the girl is getting those figures out of thin air, but the alternative implausible explanation is that the girl is masterminding a complex scheme with no obvious benefit to herself involving her somehow acquiring and memorising the prices without anyone seeing her. The idea that she just knows the prices suggests that something is happening that nobody knows about, but the concept of a complex conspiracy that doesn't benefit the girl in any way suggests a scenario contrary to what is known about typical human behavior.

Dirk is psychic, though he refuses to believe in such things, insisting that he merely has a "depressingly accurate knack for making wild assumptions". The "depressing" part is that he is seemingly unable to use this knack to win money gambling on horse racing. As a student at Cambridge University (St Cedd's College) he attempted to acquire money by selling exam papers for the upcoming tests. His fellow undergraduates were convinced that he was psychic and had produced the papers under hypnosis, while he claimed he had simply studied previous papers and determined potential patterns in questions. When his papers turned out to be exactly the same as the real ones, to the very comma, he was expelled from the university and later sent to prison.

Dirk goes on to solve a highly elaborate time travel murder mystery, and accidentally answers the age-old question of exactly who interrupted Samuel Taylor Coleridge while he was writing the poem Kubla Khan. Along the way Dirk stumbles onto a highly improbable horse in a bathroom, discovers who really composed all of Bach's music, and fails to find Schrödinger's elusive cat.

== Novels ==
- Dirk Gently's Holistic Detective Agency (1987)
- The Long Dark Tea-Time of the Soul (1988)
- The Salmon of Doubt: Hitchhiking the Galaxy One Last Time (2002) published posthumously, unfinished

== Aborted third book ==
Douglas Adams was working on a third Dirk Gently novel, The Salmon of Doubt, at the time of his death. However Adams said "A lot of the stuff which was originally in The Salmon of Doubt really wasn't working," and that he had planned on "salvaging some of the ideas that I couldn't make work in a Dirk Gently framework and putting them in a Hitchhiker framework... and for old time's sake I may call it The Salmon of Doubt." The first ten chapters of this novel, assembled from various drafts following Adams' death, together with a memo suggesting further plot points, appear in The Salmon of Doubt: Hitchhiking the Galaxy One Last Time.

== Adaptations and portrayals ==
- The South Bank Show (1992) Dirk Gently was played by Michael Bywater in the TV documentary.
- Dirk (2006) Scot Burklin portrayed Dirk in the 2006 American premiere of the play at The Road Theatre Company in Los Angeles.
- Dirk Gently's Holistic Detective Agency (2007) BBC Radio 4 played by Harry Enfield.
- The Long Dark Tea-Time of the Soul (2008) BBC Radio 4 played by Harry Enfield.
- Dirk Gently (2010, 2012) starred Stephen Mangan in the title role in a TV pilot broadcast on BBC4 in late 2010 and subsequently for a series of three episodes, broadcast in early 2012.
- Dirk Gently's Holistic Detective Agency (comic book series) IDW comic book series that uses the Dirk character, but in new stories.
  - The Interconnectedness of All Kings five issues, ran between May and November 2015, with a collected book published in 2016.
  - A Spoon too Short five issues, ran between February and June 2016, with a collected book published later that year. It featured input from some of the writing team that went on to work on the TV series.
  - The Salmon of Doubt (comic book) nine issues, ran between October 2016 and July 2017, and re-published in two collected editions. Also served as a prequel to season one of the BBC America series.
- Dirk Gently's Holistic Detective Agency (2016–17) In January 2016, BBC America ordered the production of eight episodes for a new TV series written by Max Landis and starring Samuel Barnett as the titular character, along with Elijah Wood as Todd and Hannah Marks as Amanda Brotzman, Todd's sister. The series premiered on BBC America in October of 2016 and ran for 8 episoides. The show was renewed for a second season of 10 episoides which ran from October to December of 2017.
