= The Salmon of Doubt =

2002 English-language book by Douglas Adams

- Front cover from the first UK hardcover edition
- Author: Douglas Adams
- Language: English
- Series: Dirk Gently, The Hitchhiker's Guide to the Galaxy
- Genre: Humour; Science fiction novel
- Publisher: UK: William Heinemann Ltd., US: Pocket Books
- Publication date: 11 May 2002
- Publication place: United Kingdom
- Media type: Print (Paperback and Hardcover), Audiobook (cassette and compact disc)
- Pages: 326 (paperback edition)
- ISBN: 0-330-32312-1
- OCLC: 59464153
- Preceded by: The Long Dark Tea-Time of the Soul

The Salmon of Doubt: Hitchhiking the Galaxy One Last Time is a posthumous collection of previously published and unpublished material by Douglas Adams. It consists largely of essays, interviews, and newspaper/magazine columns about technology and life experiences, but its major selling point is the inclusion of the incomplete novel on which Adams was working at the time of his death, The Salmon of Doubt (from which the collection gets its title, a reference to the Irish myth of the Salmon of Knowledge). English editions of the book were published in the United States and UK on 11 May 2002, exactly one year after the author's death.

== Original intention ==
The Salmon of Doubt was originally intended to be a Dirk Gently novel. The plot, set a few weeks after the events in The Long Dark Tea-Time of the Soul, involves Dirk Gently refusing to help find the missing half of a cat, receiving large amounts of money from an unknown client, and then flying to the United States. Dirk pays a visit to Kate Schechter (who had first appeared in The Long Dark Tea-Time of the Soul) and tells her that prior to the potential client, he had been so bored that he had started a habit of dialling his own phone number and discovered he'd answered his own calls. A faxed summary reprinted before the text mentions travelling "through the nasal membranes of a rhinoceros, to a distant future dominated by estate agents and heavily armed kangaroos."

The version in the published book was described as the strongest content from several unfinished drafts that were written.

=== Later intention ===
Adams said that while he originally planned on writing a third Dirk Gently book, the ideas which he had for it would have fitted better into another Hitchhiker's book: "A lot of the stuff which was originally in The Salmon of Doubt really wasn't working", and he planned on "salvaging some of the ideas that I couldn't make work in a Dirk Gently framework and putting them in a Hitchhiker framework... and for old time's sake I may call it The Salmon of Doubt." He had expressed dissatisfaction with the fifth Hitchhiker book, Mostly Harmless, saying "People have said, quite rightly, that Mostly Harmless is a very bleak book. And it was a bleak book. I would love to finish Hitchhiker on a slightly more upbeat note, so five seems to be a wrong kind of number; six is a better kind of number."

== Published version ==
The book as published is divided into two main sections: "Life, the Universe and Everything", which utilizes fiction, essays and interviews with Adams, and The Salmon of Doubt, which presents the most complete version of the novel as Adams left it.

The first section is further subdivided into three portions. "Life" touches upon Adams' own life, "The Universe" covers Adams' views of reality, and "Everything" deals with a wider variety of topics. "Everything" also includes the short story "The Private Life of Genghis Khan" and the original version of the Hitchhiker's companion story "Young Zaphod Plays It Safe".

The book ends with the order of events for the memorial service that was held for Adams in September 2001, at St Martin-in-the-Fields church in London.

== Editions ==
The UK edition includes an introduction by Stephen Fry, while the US edition includes one by Christopher Cerf. The audiobook edition consists of seven CDs, mostly read by Simon Jones, but also includes both of the introductions, read by their respective authors, as well as the tributes written and read by Richard Dawkins. US paperback editions have yet another introduction, written by Terry Jones, and omit some material due to issues with copyright.

The fourteenth printing of the UK/Canadian paperback, ISBN 978-0-330-32312-3, differs in content from the ninth printing of the US hardcover edition, ISBN 1-4000-4508-8, in the following ways. The paperback contains a foreword written by Stephen Fry; the hardcover contains an introduction by Christopher Cerf. Adams's letter to David Vogel on page 168 has Adams's London address at the top in the hardcover, but it is missing from the paperback. "The Private Life of Genghis Khan" has been omitted from the paperback.

The US mass market paperback edition ISBN 0-345-45529-0 contains everything in the US hardcover edition, and adds "An Introduction to the Introduction to the New Edition" and an "Introduction to the New Edition", both by Terry Jones. The material that was omitted from the UK/Canadian paperback edition is intact in the US mass market paperback edition.

=== List of editions ===
- US Hardcover edition, published by Harmony: ISBN 1-4000-4508-8
- UK Hardcover edition, published by Macmillan: ISBN 0-333-76657-1
- US audiobook edition (CD), published by New Millennium Audio: ISBN 1-59007-151-4
- US trade paperback edition, published by Ballantine: ISBN 0-345-46095-2
- US mass paperback edition, published by Del Rey: ISBN 0-345-45529-0
- UK paperback edition, published by Pan: ISBN 0-330-41956-0
- Canadian paperback edition, published by Pan: ISBN 0-330-32312-1
- US audiobook edition (CD), published by Phoenix Audio: ISBN 1-59777-006-X

== Adaptation ==
BBC Radio 4 commissioned Above the Title Productions to produce a third Dirk Gently six-part radio series scheduled for broadcast in Autumn 2009, based on the uncompleted chapters of The Salmon of Doubt and written by Dirk Maggs, who intended to utilise early notes left behind by Adams to inform his script. In December 2008, Maggs left the project to form his own audio production company, Perfectly Normal Productions.

In May 2009, it was reported that Spice World writer Kim Fuller, who had originally been hired by Adams in 1998 to write a shelved Dirk Gently TV pilot, had been hired to replace Maggs on The Salmon of Doubt. Fuller has subsequently denied ever having worked on the project.

Plans for the radio series adaptation were then cancelled in 2009 favour of creating a television adaptation of the Dirk Gently novels for BBC Four, which was released in 2010.

== See also ==
- List of works published posthumously
