= Hitchcon =

Hitchcon was a science fiction convention held at the Southbank Centre in London, England, on 11 October 2009. It celebrated the 30th anniversary of the publication of the first book in the comic sci-fi series The Hitchhiker's Guide to the Galaxy by Douglas Adams. The convention also saw the official launch for the sixth book in the series, And Another Thing..., written by Eoin Colfer, after Adams died in 2001.

Hitchcon was organised by Pan Macmillan, publisher of the original series, and Penguin Books, publisher of And Another Thing.... Pan Macmillan published a new version of the original series on 1 September 2009, 42 days before the anniversary. A new website was launched, which includes competitions, games and ringtone downloads. There was also a live Twitter feed from the convention, written in the style of the character Marvin the Paranoid Android.

Events at the convention included a photo call for fans; "The Douglas Adams Chat Show", a discussion hosted by TV presenter Clive Anderson about the works of Douglas Adams; a signing session for the original series; a live radio-style stage performance of Hitchhiker's, a reading from And Another Thing...; and a signing session for And Another Thing....
