= The Long Dark Tea-Time of the Soul =

1988 book by Douglas Adams

- The front cover of the UK first hardcover edition of The Long Dark Tea-Time of the Soul
- Author: Douglas Adams
- Language: English
- Series: Dirk Gently
- Genre: Comedy, Science Fiction, Detective Fiction
- Publisher: William Heinemann
- Publication date: 10 October 1988
- Publication place: United Kingdom
- Media type: Print (hardback and paperback) & Audio Book (Cassette, CD)
- Pages: 256 (hardcover), 320 (paperback)
- ISBN: 0-434-00921-0 (hardcover edition) & ISBN 0-671-74251-5 (US paperback edition)
- OCLC: 59213038
- Preceded by: Dirk Gently's Holistic Detective Agency
- Followed by: The Salmon of Doubt

The Long Dark Tea-Time of the Soul is a 1988 humorous fantasy detective novel by Douglas Adams. It is the second book by Adams featuring private detective Dirk Gently, the first being Dirk Gently's Holistic Detective Agency. Adams had intended to follow it with a third such novel, The Salmon of Doubt, but he died before completing it; an unfinished draft is included in a posthumously published collection of the same name.

The Long Dark Tea-Time of the Soul has been adapted for radio, and several plot lines appear in the 2010 BBC TV series.

== Title ==
The title is a phrase that appeared in Adams' novel Life, the Universe and Everything to describe the wretched boredom of immortal being Wowbagger, the Infinitely Prolonged, and is a play on the theological treatise Dark Night of the Soul, by Saint John of the Cross.

The novel is named for that time on a Sunday, after afternoon but before evening, as the weekend had finished but the week had not yet begun, that occurred to Adams as a listless limbo of the working man:

In the end, it was the Sunday afternoons he couldn't cope with, and that terrible listlessness which starts to set in at about 2:55, when you know that you've had all the baths you can usefully have that day, that however hard you stare at any given paragraph in the papers you will never actually read it, or use the revolutionary new pruning technique it describes, and that as you stare at the clock the hands will move relentlessly on to four o'clock, and you will enter the long dark teatime of the soul.

== Plot summary ==
While trying to purchase an airline ticket to Oslo at Heathrow Airport, American journalist Kate Schechter finds herself in line behind a large blond man who also wants to get on the flight but has no identification or means of payment. The check-in counter is suddenly consumed by fire, and both Kate and the man are taken to a hospital with injuries. The man is later removed from the hospital, along with his short-handled sledgehammer and a Coca-Cola vending machine, and Kate checks herself out in order to find where he has gone.

Meanwhile, "holistic" detective Dirk Gently wakes up several hours late for a meeting with songwriter Geoffrey Anstey, a new client. Anstey had engaged Dirk to protect him from a green-eyed giant armed with a scythe, saying that it had to do with a contract he had signed. When Dirk arrives at Anstey's home, he finds the man's body in a chair and his head on a record turntable. Searching the home, he discovers an envelope marked with several names, all of which are crossed out except for Anstey's, and gets his nose broken by Anstey's son while trying to question him. The boy is watching a television news broadcast on the Heathrow incident, which mentions that a check-in clerk has gone missing; Dirk recognises her as his former secretary.

At the private Woodshead Hospital, which caters to wealthy patients with bizarre medical afflictions, a one-eyed old man is removed and put into a van for transport to a new location during a visit by Kate. While following the van, she has a chance encounter with Dirk, who takes particular interest in her mention of a short man she saw accompanying the old patient.

Returning to her home, Kate finds the blond man - actually the Norse god Thor — waiting for her and in need of first aid after being glued to a wooden floor and attacked by a hostile eagle. The old patient is his father Odin, against whom he has a long-standing grudge over being repeatedly punished for losing his temper, and the short man is Odin's goblin-like assistant Toe Rag. The eagle eventually departs and makes its way into Dirk's home, trying repeatedly to attack him as he examines the document he found in Anstey's home.

Even though Dirk cannot read the printed language, the formatting of the document suggests to him that it is not a contract, but rather a bill for services rendered. He discovers that the homeless persons sleeping in and around the St Pancras railway station are actually various gods whose status has declined drastically over the centuries, due to mortals' reduced need for them. He follows them into Valhalla, where Thor has issued a challenge to Odin but failed to show up. The challenge concerns the sale of Odin's powers to a married couple, lawyer Clive Draycott and his advertising-executive wife Cynthia, who are also in attendance. Unable to support himself in the modern world, Odin had sold his powers to finance his admission to Woodshead, where he could live in comfort. The Draycotts in turn re-sold portions of that power to other parties, but Toe Rag became involved and tried to bill them for his time. The bill was passed from one buyer to another, finally reaching Anstey, and Toe Rag had him killed by the scythe-carrying giant when the payment deadline came.

Thor takes Kate to Valhalla, but all the other gods have departed and he ends up facing Odin alone. Angry over not being able to reach him by flying to Oslo, Thor had lost control of his powers, transforming a fighter jet into the eagle that harassed both Thor and Dirk, destroying the Heathrow check-in counter, and turning its clerk into the Coca-Cola machine. Thor undoes these changes to prove that he has his temper under control, but finds himself at a loss as to how to settle his disagreement with Odin. At Kate's suggestion, Odin wills his entire estate to Woodshead and is admitted as a patient for the rest of his life. The Draycotts are killed when the restored fighter jet bursts out of Dirk's home and crashes into their car.

A sub-plot involves Dirk's kitchen refrigerator, which has become so filthy that he and his cleaning lady have started trying to trick one another into opening it first. He buys a new one from a fence and has the old one hauled away. A new god ultimately bursts out of it, created from Dirk's guilt over failing to prevent Anstey's death, and kills Toe Rag and the giant.

== Adaptations ==
A BBC radio adaptation, The Long Dark Tea-Time of the Soul, starring Harry Enfield, Peter Davison, John Fortune and Stephen Moore was broadcast in October 2008.

Dirk Gently (2010–2012) starred Stephen Mangan in the title role in a pilot broadcast on BBC 4 in 2010 and a three-episode series broadcast in 2012. The series includes several plot lines from The Long Dark Tea-Time of the Soul, including Dirk's Zen navigation, his psychological battle with his cleaning lady, and a horoscope that is aimed at him personally by the compiler.
