= Dirk Maggs =

British writer and director (born 1955)

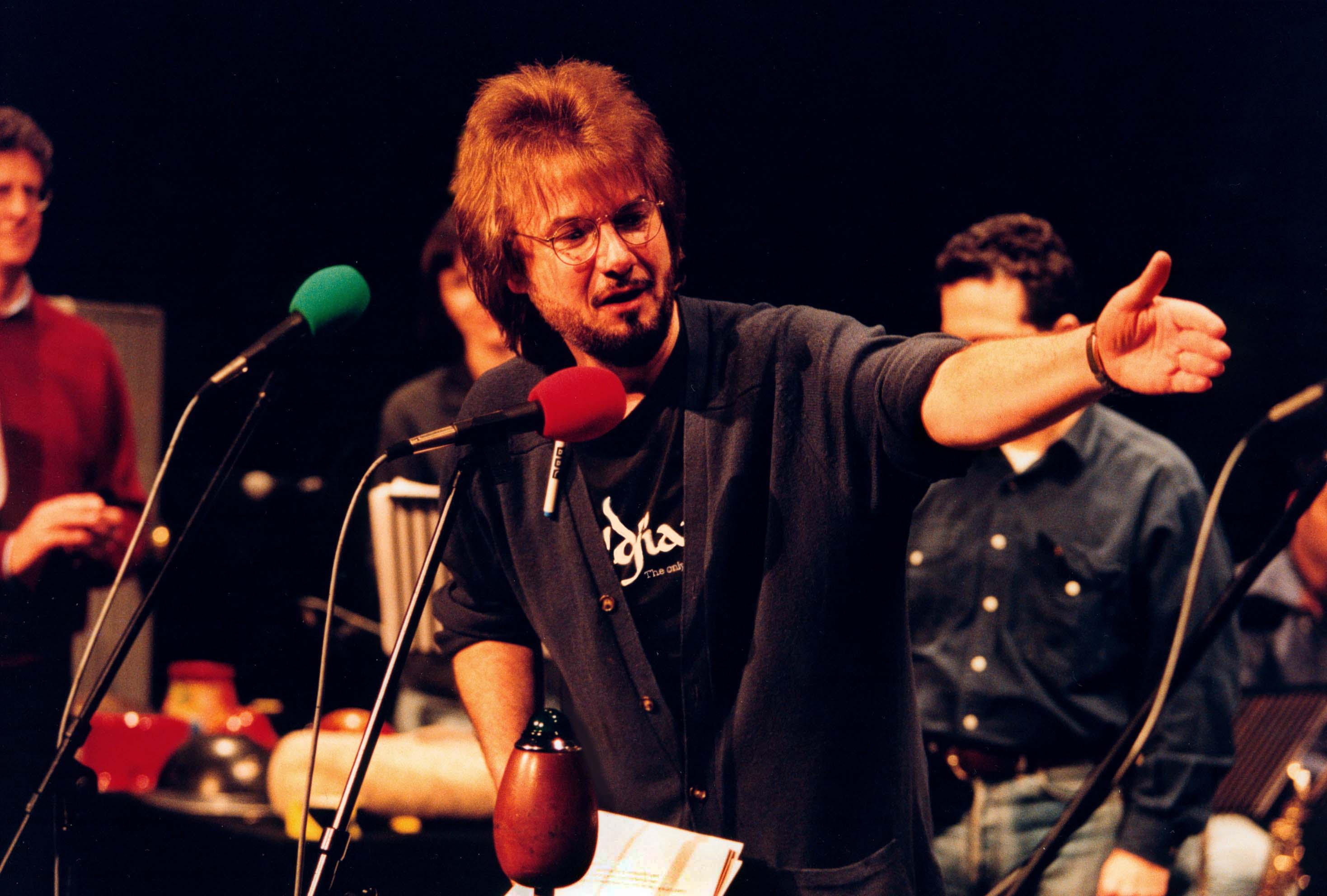
- Maggs directing GOON AGAIN on stage at The Playhouse Theatre, London in 2001.
- Born: David George Dirk Maggs; February 1955 (age 71); St Helier, Jersey, Channel Islands, U.K.
- Occupations: Radio producer; Writer
- Known for: Radio Comedy, Radio Plays, Podcasts, Streamed Audio Productions
- Notable work: Batman Knightfall (BBC Radio 1), Flywheel, Shyster & Flywheel, The Hitchhiker's Guide to the Galaxy Tertiary to Hexagonal Phases with Douglas Adams (BBC Radio 4), The Sandman for Audible / DC Comics with Neil Gaiman, Acts I, II and III
- Website: www.dirkmaggs.com

David George Dirk Maggs (born St. Helier, Jersey, February 1955) is a British freelance writer and director. During his career as a Senior Producer in BBC Radio he made radio drama adopting a cinematic-sounding approach, combining filmic story construction, layered sound effects, orchestral music and digital recording technology. Maggs introduced productions in Dolby Surround in BBC Radio and termed the result, "Audio Movies".

Maggs studied Drama for a BEd degree from 1974 to 1978 at King Alfred's College, Winchester. The college gained university status in 2005, when he was invited to become one of the first Honorary Fellows of the University of Winchester for his work in the Dramatic Arts. In 2019 he was awarded an Honorary Doctorate for his work in the Arts by Bournemouth University. In December 2021 Maggs was on a team representing the University of Winchester in BBC TV's Christmas University Challenge.

Maggs was awarded "Best Audiobook Producer" Award by the Audio Publishers Association at the 2021 Audio Production Awards at the BFI in London.

Maggs is married to Lesley Maggs, née Snow, whom he met in 1978 when they were Studio Managers in BBC World Service. They have three grown-up sons.

== Radio comedy productions ==
As a senior or producer in BBC Radio Light Entertainment Maggs produced six seasons of the gently satirical radio comedy series The News Huddlines between 1989 and 1991.

Between 1990 and 1992 he produced three series of Flywheel, Shyster, and Flywheel, an updated version of a 1932 Marx Brothers radio show of the same name. The actors were specifically chosen for their ability to impersonate the Marx Brothers, so that an accurate recreation could be achieved. One of the episodes won the gold medal at the New York International Festival.

In the late 1990s Maggs produced several series of It's Been a Bad Week and The Russ Abbot Show for Celador Productions, aired on BBC Radio 2.

Maggs produced Goon Again in 2001 for the 50th anniversary of The Goon Show with the permission of Spike Milligan. Starring Andy Secombe in his father's role of Neddie Seagoon and featuring the John Wilson Orchestra, it became in the words of Maggs, "a genetically-engineered tribute band" to the Goons. The show won the 2002 Best Comedy Award from the Spoken Word Producers Association (now the Audio Publishers Association).

In 2002 Maggs directed the Johnny Vegas radio series Night Class. This show won the Bronze award in the Comedy category of the 2003 Sony Radio Academy Awards.

In 2019 Maggs directed The Goodies in "The Big Ben Theory" for Audible (service)

== Drama and science fiction productions ==
Early in his career, Maggs worked on audio adaptations of comic book material. He started in 1988 with the 50th Anniversary Man Of Steel docudrama Superman on Trial, carried on with a 50th birthday tribute to the Dark Knight: Batman: The Lazarus Syndrome. This was followed by The Adventures Of Superman, Batman: Knightfall, The Amazing Spider-Man and his final BBC Radio superhero series, Judge Dredd in 1995. Along the way his production of Superman: Doomsday and Beyond ("Superman Lives" in the US) won the 1994 Audie Award for Best Dramatisation from the American Booksellers Association and Spoken Word Audio of The Year from Publishers Weekly.

In 2005, Time Warner audiobooks re-released Maggs's Batman: Knightfall and Superman Lives in the US, prompting a UK re-release by BBC Audiobooks.

In 1996, Maggs was contacted by 20th Century Fox and asked to create a British-based "parallel-quel" to their summer science fiction blockbuster Independence Day. The resulting programme, Independence Day UK, took place in the same world, and at the same time as the film, but showed a British perspective on the alien invasion. This also won the 1996 Talkie Award for Best Production. The next year, with the blessing of director John Landis, Maggs produced and directed his own adaptation of An American Werewolf in London for BBC Radio One. For this he won the 1997 Talkie Award for Best TV/Film Adaptation.

In 1999, he produced a five-part adaptation of Stephen Baxter's alternative history novel Voyage, the story of a space-race that never was but so easily might have been. Maggs' adaptation was presented on BBC Radio 4, and received the 1999 Talkie Award for Best Use of Music as well as the 2000 Sony Radio Academy Bronze Award for Best Drama.

Maggs directed adaptations of several Agatha Christie short stories for Radio Four, and a production of Bill Naughton's Alfie for the BBC World Service.

In 1992, Douglas Adams approached BBC Radio Light Entertainment to ask if Maggs would collaborate on bringing Adams's science fiction comedy series The Hitchhiker's Guide to the Galaxy "back home to BBC Radio", as Adams put it. Contractual issues delayed the production and was not until 2003 to 2005 that Maggs adapted, produced and directed new episodes from Adams's last three novels which were based on the premise of the original radio series written by Adams.

In 2013, Maggs wrote and co-directed (with Heather Larmour) a dramatisation the BBC Radio 4 radio play Neverwhere, based on the television series Neverwhere by Neil Gaiman. This was followed by similar productions of Neil Gaiman and Terry Pratchett's Good Omens, and BBC Radio versions of Neil Gaiman's Stardust and How The Marquis Got His Coat Back, a spin-off of Neverwhere, and finally a production of Gaiman's Anansi Boys (script only), which won the British Fantasy Society's Best Audio Award.

In 2016, Maggs was approached by Audible Originals to adapt and direct Alien: Out Of The Shadows by Tim Lebbon, the first in a series of three stories set in the Alien film universe. This was followed by Alien: River Of Pain and Alien: Sea Of Sorrows. As part of the Alien's 40th anniversary, Maggs adapted and directed an audiobook version of William Gibson's unproduced screenplay of Alien 3, which was then released on May 30, 2019, and made available on Audible. The production starred Michael Biehn and Lance Henriksen, who reprised their roles of Corporal Hicks and Bishop from the film Aliens. This was followed by Executive Producing and adapting from the IDW comic book continuation by Joe Harris, The X-Files as a full-cast audio drama reuniting David Duchovny and Gillian Anderson as Mulder and Scully, with Mitch Pileggi as Skinner and William B. Davis as a different iteration of the Cigarette-Smoking Man. The two adaptations, Cold Cases and Stolen Lives were released in 2017.

== The Sandman Audio Dramas (Audible Originals/DC Comics) ==
In the early 1990s Maggs was introduced to Neil Gaiman by a mutual friend, Phyllis Hume, of DC Comics International Business Affairs. For nearly three decades Maggs and Gaiman looked for a way to turn Gaiman's The Sandman comic book series into audio drama. With combined support from Audible and DC Comics, the project finally got under way in 2019.

On July 15, 2020, Audible released an adaptation of the comic book series as a multi-part audio drama directed by Dirk Maggs with music by James Hannigan. The voice cast included Gaiman as the Narrator, James McAvoy as Dream, Kat Dennings as Death, Taron Egerton as John Constantine, Michael Sheen as Lucifer, Riz Ahmed as the Corinthian, Andy Serkis as Matthew the Raven, Samantha Morton as Urania Blackwell, Bebe Neuwirth as The Siamese Cat, Arthur Darvill as William Shakespeare, and Justin Vivian Bond as Desire. The production spent two months at #1 in The New York Times Best Seller list

The follow-up, The Sandman: Act II, was released on 22 September 2021, and featured most of the original cast. New additions to the cast included: Regé-Jean Page as Orpheus, Jeffrey Wright as Destiny, Brian Cox as Augustus, Emma Corrin as Thessaly, John Lithgow as Joshua Norton, David Tennant as Loki, Bill Nighy as Odin, Kristen Schaal as Delirium, Kevin Smith as Merv Pumpkinhead, and Niamh Walsh as Nuala. Neuwirth also returned, but portrayed Bast.

The Sandman: Act III is again adapted and directed by Maggs and was released in October, 2022.

== Productions in other media ==
Maggs was audio director for the first Animated Mr Bean television series 1999-2001 starring Rowan Atkinson.

For the feature-length animated film of The Magic Roundabout, Maggs voice-directed principal character sessions with actors including Robbie Williams, Kylie Minogue, Jim Broadbent, Ray Winstone and Joanna Lumley.

Maggs is credited as Voice Director on the highly acclaimed adventure game, Broken Sword: The Sleeping Dragon featuring Rolf Saxon and Sarah Crook.
