= Derrick Borte =

American filmmaker

- Born: December 7, 1967 (age 58); Frankfurt, Germany
- Occupations: Film director; screenwriter; film producer
- Years active: 2010–present

Derrick Stacey Borte (born December 7, 1967) is a German-born American filmmaker known for the dark comedy The Joneses (2010), which he wrote, directed, and produced. The film was his directorial debut.

== Biography ==
=== Early life ===
Borte was born on December 7, 1967, in Frankfurt, Germany, to Donald and Susan Borte. When Borte was less than a year old, the family moved to Norfolk, Virginia. Borte later moved to Virginia Beach, Virginia, where he graduated in 1985 from First Colonial High School. He graduated from Old Dominion University (ODU) with a BFA in painting, and moved to Los Angeles in 1991, where he started selling his work in a prominent art gallery. He also did graphic design work for surf companies, such as Billabong, Gotcha, and Rip Curl.

In 1992, Borte moved back east to New York, where he attended Parsons School of Design, graduating with a Master of Arts degree in media studies. He joined the production staff at Sony Music Studios, where his fine arts background evolved with his indoctrination to film and video, working on MTV Unplugged and music videos. In 1996, after graduating from Parsons, he landed a job at WAVY-TV 10, returning to Virginia Beach. He worked as a TV reporter, focusing mainly on human-interest features.

In 1998, he quit the station and started his own business making commercials. Borte started writing film scripts over the years in his spare time, writing a lot of bad ones, before finally writing one, that according to Borte, "everybody wanted...[a]nd I mean everybody." Borte wanted to direct the movie, so he contacted Scott Lochmus to help produce the film. Lochmus had hired Borte at Sony back in the '90s, and they had become friends. The two eventually started their own production company, Storyland Pictures.

=== Career ===
In 2010, he wrote, produced, and directed the dark comedy The Joneses, which starred Demi Moore and David Duchovny. Borte said he got the idea for the movie from watching a news magazine show that had focused on stealth marketing. He chose the location for the film, Alpharetta, Georgia, while on a layover at Hartsfield–Jackson Airport, vacationing with his family.

In 2013, Borte directed Dark Around the Stars starring Mark Kassen, who portrays a mysterious and troubled alcoholic on a road trip to New Mexico, where he plans to take his life on his birthday.

In 2015, he co-wrote and directed the suspense-thriller film H8RZ starring Abigail Spencer, Eliza Bennett and Israel Broussard. The film had a pre-release screening at his alma mater, Old Dominion University.

London Town, released in 2016, was Borte's fourth film as director. The film is a coming-of-age story starring Daniel Huttlestone and Jonathan Rhys Meyers, who portrays Joe Strummer, co-founder of British punk rock band The Clash. In an interview with The Spill Magazine, Borte said he had been given a copy of the first Clash album when he was in junior high school, and that "within the first few minutes I just had a realization that was the music that I was supposed to listen to." He went on to say that the "movie itself is really about the power of music to change your life" as it did for the lead character in the movie.

In 2019, he co-wrote and directed American Dreamer, a thriller starring Jim Gaffigan and Robbie Jones. The film was shot in his hometown of Virginia Beach, where he partnered with ODU and the Virginia Film Office in a workforce initiative to let 25 students intern on the film.

Borte directed Russell Crowe, Caren Pistorius, and Gabriel Bateman, in the 2020 film Unhinged, a road rage thriller filmed on location in New Orleans, and released in late summer. The film received mixed reviews.

== Filmography ==
Year	Title	Director	Writer	Producer
2009	The Joneses	Yes	Yes	Yes
2013	Dark Around the Stars	Yes	No	Executive
2015	H8RZ	Yes	Yes	No
2016	London Town	Yes	No	No
2019	American Dreamer	Yes	Yes	No
2020	Unhinged	Yes	No	No
2026	The Get Out	Yes	Yes	No
