= Jeff Leach =

British actor and comedian

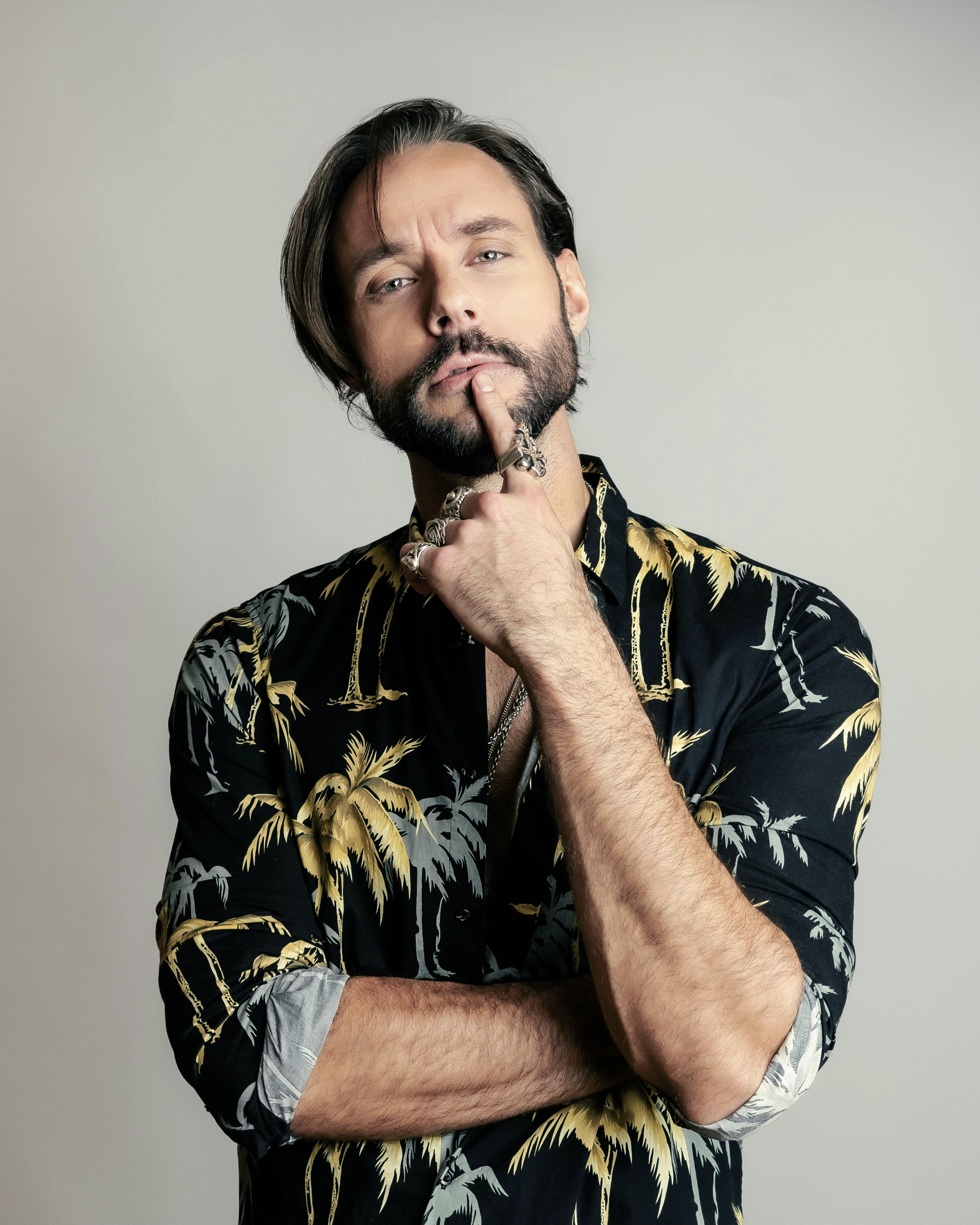
- Born: Jeffrey Alexander Leach; London, England
- Occupation(s): Actor, writer, comedian
- Notable work: London Town; Big Brother's Big Mouth; Hollyoaks
- Website: jeffreyleach.com

Jeff Alexander Leach is an English actor, writer and stand-up comedian. He has also worked as a television and radio presenter on programmes in the United Kingdom, United States, Australia, and Europe.

He is most well known for appearing in feature films The Smoke as Dean, and London Town as Ronnie, as well as voicing Simon "Ghost" Riley in Call of Duty: Modern Warfare. On television, he has hosted many shows for BBC Switch, BBC Three and E4.

== Early life ==
Leach was raised in London; his father a Cockney engineer, and his mother a Romanian drama teacher. Leach claims Aromanian descent through his mother's line. At four years old, he began his acting journey with a standout cross-dressing lead role as 'Madame Diptheria Iceberg' in a school production, marking the inception of a lifelong passion for performance. Educated at the John Lyon School for boys in Harrow, he obtained a degree from the University of Warwick in English Literature and Theatre Studies.

== Television career ==
After obtaining his degree, Leach became a presenter for the BBC Switch show The Surgery on BBC Two. After presenting Scene Stealers for BBC Switch and T in the Park Festival for BBC Three Leach had a stint as presenter of Big Brother's Big Mouth on E4. From 2009 to 2012 he became the face of Virgin Media and their Music on Demand channel, which saw him present each year from V Festival. There he would provide comedic continuity links between the channel's programming, and interview artists like Lady Gaga, Example, Kelly Rowland, and Professor Green.

Between 2010 and 2012, he was signed by the UK branch of Current TV to present two series of their show What Did I Do Last Night?. Its premise involved cameras following the antics of young British people on a night out, who were then shown their behaviour the following morning when hungover. Leach was also signed by BBC One to present The National Lottery Draws. During this time he hosted other shows for Current TV including an exposé on the dangers of male escorting entitled Male Hookers Uncovered, in which Leach became a male escort for the purposes of the immersive documentary. Following on from this, he presented one more documentary about sex addiction for BBC Three called Confessions of a Sex Addict.

In 2014, with London Live launching in the UK, Jeff Leach became the presenter and executive producer of his own series known as Jeff Leach +1. In 2015, he hosted the PromaxBDA Europe Awards in Berlin, an event celebrating top works in television promotion, marketing, and design across Europe. In 2019, he recorded an episode of Dinner With Dani for Amazon Prime, and during 2020 he recorded multiple live shows for Comedy Central's stand-up comedy series This Week At The Cellar.

== Stand-up and film career and voice work ==
Leach began his stand-up career in February 2010, performing on the UK comedy circuit and at the Edinburgh Fringe Festival. He was a finalist in the London New Comedian Award 2010, Laughing Horse New Act 2011 and a semi-finalist in the Leicester Square New Comedian 2011. He performed at the Edinburgh Fringe Festival in 2011 and 2012, becoming a Top Ten Finalist in the Amused Moose Laugh Off Competition 2012. In 2013 Leach began dating Canadian comedienne Katherine Ryan, but this relationship would end.

In May 2014 Leach embarked on his debut solo comedy tour entitled 'Jeff Leach. FIT'.

His first professional theatre work was with the Royal Shakespeare Company during the Complete Works of Shakespeare Festival season, playing the lead in Lope de Vega's 'The Capulets and the Montagues'. In 2013 Jeff completed a role in short film Shop Girl Blog and played rocker Lenny in online comedy series The Chaos. During 2014 he performed as Simon in the Channel 4 show Hollyoaks, and played the role of Dean in feature length independent British gangster thriller film The Smoke.

During 2015 he appeared in a number of short films, winning one award from the industry website Shooting People another at the Berlin Short Film Festival.

He appeared in Derrick Borte's 2016 film London Town.

Leach voiced Simon "Ghost" Riley in the 2019 video game Call of Duty: Modern Warfare. In May 2021, Activision announced that they had cut ties with Leach due to comments he made on Tauntfest in 2017 and a livestream in late 2020. Leach said the comments were taken out of context and that he was actually responding to an Internet troll.

In 2023, his special "Jeff Leach presents A Comedy Spectacular" was released

== Personal life ==
Leach lives in Los Angeles.

Leach became an ambassador for Angelus Foundation, a drug education charity, after losing one of his best friends, Louise Cattell, to the club drug ketamine. Leach, with THINND, hosted a Juneteenth gaming stream, raising over $31,435 for the Equal Justice Initiative in honor of George Floyd. In a charity gaming stream, Jeff Leach, alongside ZLaner and Facebook Gaming friends, successfully raised $10,343 for The National Autistic Society, surpassing their $10,000 goal with the support of 245 donors.

Leach began collaborating with the nonprofit organization U.S.VETS Las Vegas in 2024 to support efforts to end veteran homelessness. On November 2, 2024, he participated in the annual Veterans Stand Down, where over 600 veterans received housing assistance, medical care, legal support, clothing, and other essential services. On May 17, 2025, Leach served as the emcee and a participant in the 3rd Annual Steps for Vets 5K at Desert Breeze Park in Las Vegas, personally raising $1,595 toward the event’s fundraising goal. and helping the campaign surpass its $88,000 target, with a final total of $88,900. In an impromptu interview with the "Vegas Veteran Voices" podcast, Leach said, “I really enjoy being a part of these events honoring those men and women who so bravely served their country, but also being part of such a fun, family-friendly event like this. It warms my heart on a Saturday, you know?”
