= Temptation: Confessions of a Marriage Counselor =

2013 US romance drama film by Tyler Perry

- Theatrical release poster
- Directed by: Tyler Perry
- Screenplay by: Tyler Perry
- Based on: The Marriage Counselor by Tyler Perry
- Produced by: Tyler Perry; Ozzie Areu; Paul Hall
- Starring: Jurnee Smollett; Lance Gross; Kim Kardashian; Vanessa Williams; Robbie Jones; Brandy Norwood
- Cinematography: Alexander Gruszynski
- Edited by: Maysie Hoy
- Music by: Aaron Zigman
- Production company: Tyler Perry Studios
- Distributed by: Lionsgate
- Release date: March 29, 2013
- Running time: 111 minutes
- Country: United States
- Language: English
- Budget: $37 million
- Box office: $53.1 million

Temptation: Confessions of a Marriage Counselor is a 2013 American romantic drama film produced, written, and directed by Tyler Perry. The film is adapted from Perry's play The Marriage Counselor, with several changes. It was released on March 29, 2013.

== Plot ==
In a rundown office, a marriage counselor counsels a young married couple, Bradley and Lisa. After the husband walks out of the room, unwilling to participate, the counselor notices a change in the wife's demeanor. The marriage counselor can tell that she has met someone else and decides to tell her a story about her sister, Judith.

In flashbacks, Judith and her childhood sweetheart Brice are seen growing up through the years together. Once married, the two move to Washington, D.C. Judith becomes a therapist, working at a matchmaking agency owned by Janice, while Brice works as a pharmacist. At work, Brice meets another employee, Melinda. Melinda reveals she is on the run from an abusive ex-boyfriend.

Judith is dissatisfied with her job and anxious to start her own marriage counseling business, but Brice tells her to wait until they are more financially stable. Brice decides to take Judith out for dinner at a "$5.99 buffet". Judith becomes upset with Brice when he refuses to confront a group of men who catcall her on their way home from dinner.

Judith meets Harley at work. Harley, a wealthy Internet entrepreneur who wants to invest in Janice's business, attempts to seduce Judith as they work late on matchmaking surveys. When Harley questions the absence of sex in the surveys, Judith says she does not believe in premarital sex. Harley says Judith's sex life is boring. Judith, now questioning her sex life with Brice, tries to improve it, but fails.

Judith changes her hair and makeup for her birthday and Brice fails to notice the change or remember her birthday. At work, Judith receives flowers that she believes are from Brice. Harley appears and notes her change in appearance—the flowers are actually from him. Harley claims he is willing to do anything to be near her and wants a sexual relationship. At home, Judith leaves a cupcake with a candle in it on the counter. Realizing his mistake, Brice dances and sings in a cowboy outfit for her. The two make up.

Janice sends Judith to New Orleans with Harley to finalize a deal with shareholders, telling her to flirt with Harley and to be careful. Judith's co-worker, Ava, gives Judith a makeover. In New Orleans, Judith and Harley complete the business deal and go dancing and sightseeing. On the way home, Harley seduces Judith, and they have sex in his private jet. He takes her home and meets Judith's Christian mother, Miss Sarah.

Unhappy with Brice's inattentiveness, Judith sneaks out to meet Harley, and they have sex again and Harley introduces Judith to cocaine. He demands that she leave Brice and offers to help with her business. When she feels like she shouldn't, Harley tells her to leave, and she becomes upset and starts throwing drinks and food at him. Back at home, Judith and her mother Sarah get into an argument over Harley, and about Sarah having abandoned Judith's father for the Lord years ago, which leads to Sarah slapping Judith and leaving. Judith refuses to discuss the argument with Brice and goes to take a shower. She later leaves him to be with Harley.

Janice fires Judith immediately after finding out about her plans to quit in a week to start a new business with Harley. Brice discovers Judith is having an affair and heads to Harley's party. Brice drags Judith outside and begs her to return to him, but Judith chooses to stay with Harley. Brice goes over to Melinda's place where she comforts him and encourages him that things will get better. Judith returns to the apartment she shared with Brice to pick up a laptop and is surrounded by her mother and church members in a prayer circle. Sarah grabs Judith, trying to prevent her from leaving, but Harley knocks Sarah down and forces Judith to leave. At Harley's, Judith is outraged by his treatment of her mother, and after a heated argument, Harley begins to beat her after she attempts to leave.

Melinda comes over to cook for Brice. She says she contracted HIV from her ex, who is revealed to be Harley. Brice breaks into Harley's place with Melinda and finds Judith in the bathroom bloody and bruised. After taking Judith to his truck, Brice goes back into the house and begins to beat Harley until he is stopped by Melinda. As Harley regains consciousness, he calls out to Melinda, whose real name is Karen. Brice threatens him to stay away from both Karen and Judith and they leave him, lying on the floor beaten and still semi-conscious.

Cut back to the present day, the marriage counselor has finished the story, and Lisa wonders how the story ends. The marriage counselor tells her that Judith contracted HIV as well, but not Brice. Lisa thanks the marriage counselor and decides to stay with her husband.

The marriage counselor (revealed to be the older Judith) then goes to the pharmacy to get her HIV medicine for her T cell count from Brice. Judith tells Brice she has now decided to follow the path of God. After they speak, a woman and a little boy walk into the pharmacy, revealed to be Brice's new wife and child, making it clear that they have divorced. In front of Judith, Brice hugs and kisses his new family and tells them he loves them. Judith then walks regretfully out of the pharmacy.

== Cast ==
- Jurnee Smollett-Bell as Judith
- Lance Gross as Brice
- Brandy Norwood as Melinda/Karen
- Vanessa Williams as Janice
- Robbie Jones as Harley
- Kim Kardashian as Ava
- Renée Taylor as Ms. Waco Chapman
- Ella Joyce as Sarah
- Candice Coke as Marriage Counselor
- Zach Sale as Bradley
- Andrea Moore as Lisa

== Production ==
Principal photography began on October 26, 2011, and ended on January 6, 2012, in Atlanta at Tyler Perry Studios. Tyler Perry, Ozzie Areu and Paul Hall produced the film. The film was originally scheduled for release in 2012, but was pushed back for a March 2013 release. In initial reports regarding the film's cast, it was stated that veteran actor Jerry Stiller was going to have an unspecified role in the film, but was ultimately proven to be false.

== Box office ==
Temptation grossed $21,641,679 on its opening weekend and debuted at number 3 at the box office behind G.I. Joe: Retaliation and The Croods. Its box office total was $53,125,354. It is the highest-grossing Tyler Perry film which the writer-director did not star in and the highest-grossing Tyler Perry drama.

== Home media ==
Temptation was released on DVD and Blu-ray on July 9, 2013, with two featurettes and includes a digital copy. Tyler Perry's play The Haves and the Have Nots was also released on DVD on the same date.

== Reception ==
The film was not screened for critics but has received predominantly negative reviews. As of May 2025, the film holds a 22% approval rating on Rotten Tomatoes, based on 37 reviews with an average rating of 3.90 out of 10. At Metacritic, which assigns a weighted average rating out of 100 to reviews from mainstream critics, the film has received a weighted score of 26 from 14 reviews, indicating "generally unfavorable reviews". Audiences polled by CinemaScore gave the film an average grade of "A-" on an A+ to F scale. Many point to the fact that the main character was "punished" with HIV for cheating on her husband, further miseducating and stigmatizing the disease.

Kim Kardashian won the Razzie Award for Worst Supporting Actress for her performance in the film, while Tyler Perry was nominated for Worst Director (where he lost to the 13 people who directed Movie 43).
