= David L. Williams (film director) =

British film director

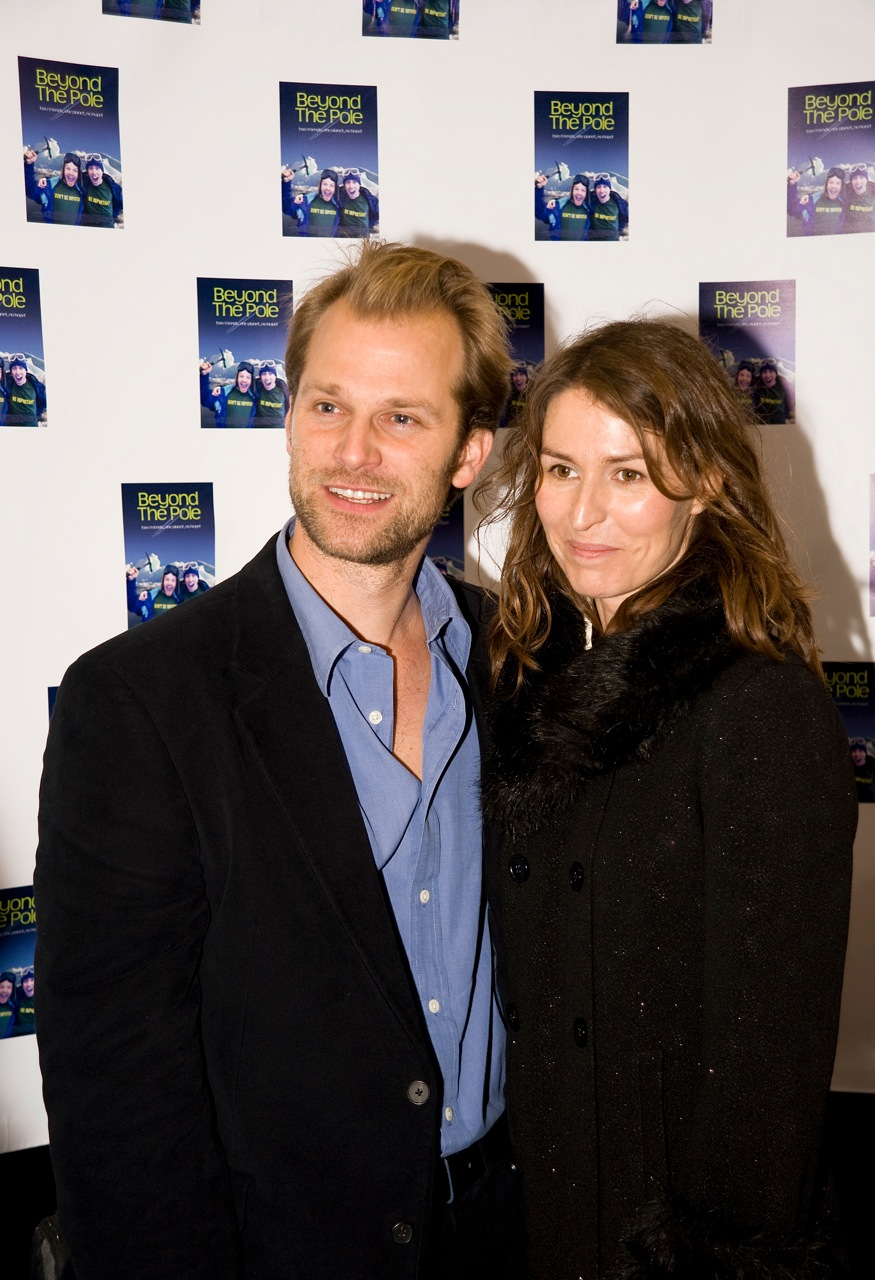
- Williams with Helen Baxendale at Beyond the Pole premiere, 2010
- Citizenship: United Kingdom
- Occupations: Film director, writer, and producer
- Spouse: Helen Baxendale (m. 1993)
- Children: 3; including Nell
- Writing career
- Genres: Drama, comedy, documentary

David L. Williams is a British film director, writer, and producer living in London. An active film campaigner in Rwanda (Genocide) and Liberia (Deforestation), his commercial work with the UK production house Shooting Pictures has led to collaborations with comedians including Dom Joly, Russell Brand, and Alistair McGowan. His debut cinema feature, the Arctic comedy Beyond the Pole, was his first attempt to fuse comedy with his campaigning work and was supported by Friends of the Earth. In November 2010 Williams collaborated with members of The Fast Show team to campaign for the Sustainable Livestock Bill, legislation designed to protect the Amazonian rainforest and support more local, planet friendly farming.

== Career ==
Williams began his career as an actor, working regularly with theatre director Matthew Lloyd at the Almeida Theatre, Leicester Haymarket and Glasgow Citizens Theatre, where he met his partner, Helen Baxendale. Television and film roles included the BBC's Harry, and a lead for two series in Russell T Davies' BAFTA winning, The Ward.

Moving behind the camera Williams founded Shooting Pictures in 2000 with Baxendale, and has since led more than a 100 shoots across 5 continents. His television comedy, Flyfishing, starring Frances Barber and Kate Ashfield, sold to over 30 countries.

In 2009 Williams directed, produced and co-wrote the Arctic comedy, Beyond the Pole, for Shooting Pictures. Premiering in the Best of British strand at the Glasgow International Film Festival, Beyond the Pole went on to win 9 awards on the festival circuit in America and Europe, before its UK cinema release. Starring Stephen Mangan, Rhys Thomas, Mark Benton and Alexander Skarsgard, the film was shot on floating sea ice off the coast of Greenland.

== Personal life ==
Williams has been with his girlfriend Helen Baxendale since the early to mid-1990s. The couple have three children, including actress Nell Williams.
