= The Marriage Counselor =

Play written by Tyler Perry

- Original language: English
- Written by: Tyler Perry
- Characters: Judith, Roger, Floyd, T.T., Michelle, Oscar, Becky, Patrice, Reverend Tank, Lisa and Ronald
- Subject: Marriage, Infidelity
- Genre: Comedy-Drama

Premiere
- Date: January 8, 2008

The Marriage Counselor is a 2008 American stage play created, written, directed and produced by Tyler Perry. It is his tenth play. The show toured from January 2008 to June 2009. It stars Tamar Davis as Dr. Judith Jackson and Tony Grant as Roger Jackson. The live performance released on DVD on January 13, 2009 was taped in Cleveland at the State Theatre at Playhouse Square in May 2008.

== Plot ==
Roger Jackson is an accountant who takes care of his wife Judith, as well as her mother T.T. and his father Floyd, who were both displaced by Hurricane Katrina. The two parents bicker constantly; Floyd smokes marijuana and grows it in the Jacksons' yard. Judith is an Ivy League-educated marriage counselor who gives marital advice every day, yet seems not to recognize the issues with her own marriage. An old college flame entices her to leave her husband, parents, home and practice. Through a series of unpredictable events, she finds that her new life may not be as wonderful as she thought. Lisa, who cleans her office, hands in her notice and reveals that she has HIV, courtesy of her womanizing, drug-using ex-husband. Unknowingly, Judith slowly leaves her life just as her husband is trying to improve and revitalize their relationship. One day he decides to surprise her at her practice.... with her new husband.

== Tour Dates ==
Scheduled Shows
| Date | City | Venue |
|---|---|---|
| January 8, 2008 | Little Rock | Robinson Center Music Hall |
| January 9, 2008 | Little Rock | Robinson Center Music Hall |
| January 10, 2008 | Dallas | Music Hall at Fair Park |
| January 11, 2008 | Dallas | Music Hall at Fair Park |
| January 12, 2008 | Dallas | Music Hall at Fair Park |
| January 13, 2008 | Dallas | Music Hall at Fair Park |
| January 15, 2008 | Phoenix | Dodge Theatre |
| January 17, 2008 | Los Angeles | Kodak Theatre |
| January 18, 2008 | Los Angeles | Kodak Theatre |
| January 19, 2008 | Los Angeles | Kodak Theatre |
| January 20, 2008 | Los Angeles | Kodak Theatre |
| January 24, 2008 | Jacksonville | Times-Union Center for the Performing Arts |
| January 25, 2008 | Jacksonville | Times-Union Center for the Performing Arts |
| January 26, 2008 | Jacksonville | Times-Union Center for the Performing Arts |
| January 27, 2008 | Jacksonville | Times-Union Center for the Performing Arts |
| January 29, 2008 | Philadelphia | Merriam Theater |
| January 30, 2008 | Philadelphia | Merriam Theater |
| January 31, 2008 | Philadelphia | Merriam Theater |
| February 1, 2008 | Philadelphia | Merriam Theater |
| February 2, 2008 | Philadelphia | Merriam Theater |
| February 3, 2008 | Philadelphia | Merriam Theater |
| February 5, 2008 | Orlando | Orange County Convention Center |
| February 6, 2008 | Orlando | Orange County Convention Center |
| February 7, 2008 | Miami | James L. Knight Center |
| February 8, 2008 | Miami | James L. Knight Center |
| February 9, 2008 | Miami | James L. Knight Center |
| February 10, 2008 | Miami | James L. Knight Center |
| February 12, 2008 | North Charleston | North Charleston Coliseum |
| February 13, 2008 | North Charleston | North Charleston Coliseum |
| February 14, 2008 | Columbia | Township Auditorium |
| February 15, 2008 | Columbia | Township Auditorium |
| February 16, 2008 | Columbia | Township Auditorium |
| February 17, 2008 | Columbia | Township Auditorium |
| February 19, 2008 | East Lansing | Wharton Center for Performing Arts |
| February 21, 2008 | Peoria | Peoria Civic Center |
| February 22, 2008 | Indianapolis | Murat Theatre |
| February 23, 2008 | Indianapolis | Murat Theatre |
| February 24, 2008 | Indianapolis | Murat Theatre |
| February 28, 2008 | Philadelphia | Merriam Theatre |
| February 29, 2008 | Philadelphia | Merriam Theatre |
| March 1, 2008 | Philadelphia | Merriam Theatre |
| March 2, 2008 | Philadelphia | Merriam Theatre |
| March 6, 2008 | Nashville | Tennessee Performing Arts Center |
| March 7, 2008 | Nashville | Tennessee Performing Arts Center |
| March 8, 2008 | Nashville | Tennessee Performing Arts Center |
| March 9, 2008 | Nashville | Tennessee Performing Arts Center |
| March 13, 2008 | Memphis | Orpheum Theatre |
| March 14, 2008 | Memphis | Orpheum Theatre |
| March 15, 2008 | Memphis | Orpheum Theatre |
| March 16, 2008 | Memphis | Orpheum Theatre |
| March 18, 2008 | Albany | Albany Civic Center |
| March 20, 2008 | New Orleans | New Orleans Convention Center |
| March 21, 2008 | New Orleans | New Orleans Convention Center |
| March 22, 2008 | New Orleans | New Orleans Convention Center |
| March 23, 2008 | New Orleans | New Orleans Convention Center |
| March 25, 2008 | Baltimore | Murphy Fine Arts Center |
| March 26, 2008 | Baltimore | Murphy Fine Arts Center |
| March 27, 2008 | Baltimore | Murphy Fine Arts Center |
| March 28, 2008 | Baltimore | Murphy Fine Arts Center |
| March 29, 2008 | Baltimore | Murphy Fine Arts Center |
| March 30, 2008 | Baltimore | Murphy Fine Arts Center |
| April 3, 2008 | Detroit | Fox Theatre |
| April 4, 2008 | Detroit | Fox Theatre |
| April 5, 2008 | Detroit | Fox Theatre |
| April 6, 2008 | Detroit | Fox Theatre |
| April 10, 2008 | Louisville | Louisville Palace |
| April 11, 2008 | Cincinnati | Aronoff Center |
| April 12, 2008 | Cincinnati | Aronoff Center |
| April 13, 2008 | Pittsburgh | Petersen Events Center |
| April 17, 2008 | Atlanta | Fox Theatre |
| April 18, 2008 | Atlanta | Fox Theatre |
| April 19, 2008 | Atlanta | Fox Theatre |
| April 20, 2008 | Atlanta | Fox Theatre |
| April 22, 2008 | Richmond | Landmark Theater |
| April 23, 2008 | Richmond | Landmark Theater |
| April 24, 2008 | Richmond | Landmark Theater |
| April 25, 2008 | Richmond | Landmark Theater |
| April 26, 2008 | Hampton | Hampton Coliseum |
| April 27, 2008 | Hampton | Hampton Coliseum |
| April 29, 2008 | Dayton | Schuster Center |
| April 30, 2008 | Dayton | Schuster Center |
| May 1, 2008 | Chicago | Arie Crown Theater |
| May 2, 2008 | Chicago | Arie Crown Theater |
| May 3, 2008 | Chicago | Arie Crown Theater |
| May 4, 2008 | Chicago | Arie Crown Theater |
| May 6, 2008 | Columbus | Veterans Memorial Auditorium |
| May 7, 2008 | Columbus | Veterans Memorial Auditorium |
| May 9, 2008 | Cleveland | State Theatre |
| May 10, 2008 | Cleveland | State Theatre |
| May 11, 2008 | Cleveland | State Theatre |
| September 9, 2008 | Tampa | USF Sun Dome |
| September 10, 2008 | Tallahassee | Tallahassee-Leon County Civic Center |
| September 11, 2008 | Atlanta | Fabulous Fox Theatre |
| September 12, 2008 | Atlanta | Fabulous Fox Theatre |
| September 13, 2008 | Atlanta | Fabulous Fox Theatre |
| September 14, 2008 | Atlanta | Fabulous Fox Theatre |
| September 16, 2008 | Washington, D.C. | Warner Theatre |
| September 17, 2008 | Washington, D.C. | Warner Theatre |
| September 18, 2008 | Washington, D.C. | Warner Theatre |
| September 19, 2008 | Washington, D.C. | Warner Theatre |
| September 20, 2008 | Washington, D.C. | Warner Theatre |
| September 21, 2008 | Washington, D.C. | Warner Theatre |
| September 23, 2008 | Buffalo | Shea's Performing Arts Center |
| September 24, 2008 | Buffalo | Shea's Performing Arts Center |
| September 25, 2008 | Rochester | Auditorium Theatre |
| September 26, 2008 | Boston | Boch Center |
| September 27, 2008 | Boston | Boch Center |
| September 28, 2008 | Boston | Boch Center |
| October 7, 2008 | Albany | Palace Theatre |
| October 8, 2008 | Syracuse | Landmark Theatre |
| October 10, 2008 | Memphis | Orpheum Theatre |
| October 11, 2008 | Memphis | Orpheum Theatre |
| October 12, 2008 | Memphis | Orpheum Theatre |
| October 14, 2008 | South Bend | Morris Performing Arts Center |
| October 15, 2008 | Rockford | Coronado Performing Arts Center |
| October 16, 2008 | Fort Wayne | Embassy Theatre |
| October 17, 2008 | Grand Rapids | Van Andel Arena |
| October 18, 2008 | Chicago | Arie Crown Theater |
| October 19, 2008 | Chicago | Arie Crown Theater |
| October 21, 2008 | Huntsville | Von Braun Center |
| October 22, 2008 | Huntsville | Von Braun Center |
| October 23, 2008 | Greenville | Bi-Lo Center |
| October 24, 2008 | Fayetteville | Crown Center of Cumberland |
| October 25, 2008 | Fayetteville | Crown Center of Cumberland |
| October 26, 2008 | Fayetteville | Crown Center of Cumberland |
| October 28, 2008 | Raleigh | RBC Center |
| October 29, 2008 | Raleigh | RBC Center |
| October 31, 2008 | Charlotte | Cricket Arena |
| November 1, 2008 | Charlotte | Cricket Arena |
| November 18, 2008 | Jackson | Mississippi Coliseum |
| November 19, 2008 | Jackson | Mississippi Coliseum |
| November 20, 2008 | Houston | Hobby Center for the Performing Arts |
| November 21, 2008 | Houston | Hobby Center for the Performing Arts |
| November 22, 2008 | Houston | Hobby Center for the Performing Arts |
| November 23, 2008 | Houston | Hobby Center for the Performing Arts |
| January 16, 2009 | Oakland | Paramount Theatre |
| January 17, 2009 | Oakland | Paramount Theatre |
| January 18, 2009 | Oakland | Paramount Theatre |
| February 7, 2009 | Kansas City | Kansas City Music Hall |
| February 8, 2009 | Kansas City | Kansas City Music Hall |
| February 18, 2009 | Shreveport | RiverView Theater |
| February 25, 2009 | Davenport | Adler Theatre |
| March 3, 2009 | El Paso | Abraham Chavez Theatre |
| March 6, 2009 | Las Vegas | Planet Hollywood Resort and Casino |
| March 7, 2009 | Las Vegas | Planet Hollywood Resort and Casino |
| March 11, 2009 | New Haven | Shubert Theatre |
| March 12, 2009 | New Haven | Shubert Theatre |
| March 13, 2009 | New Haven | Shubert Theatre |
| March 14, 2009 | Hartford | Bushnell Center |
| March 15, 2009 | Hartford | Bushnell Center |
| March 18, 2009 | Portland | Arlene Schnitzer Concert Hall |
| March 20, 2009 | Seattle | Paramount Theatre |
| March 21, 2009 | Seattle | Paramount Theatre |
| March 22, 2009 | Seattle | Paramount Theatre |
| April 7, 2009 | New York | Beacon Theatre |
| April 8, 2009 | New York | Beacon Theatre |
| April 9, 2009 | New York | Beacon Theatre |
| April 10, 2009 | New York | Beacon Theatre |
| April 11, 2009 | New York | Beacon Theatre |
| April 12, 2009 | New York | Beacon Theatre |
| April 28, 2009 | New York | Beacon Theatre |
| April 29, 2009 | New York | Beacon Theatre |
| April 30, 2009 | New York | Beacon Theatre |
| May 1, 2009 | New York | Beacon Theatre |
| May 2, 2009 | New York | Beacon Theatre |
| May 3, 2009 | New York | Beacon Theatre |

== Cast ==
- Tamar Davis as Dr. Judith Jackson
- Tony Grant as Roger Jackson
- Palmer Williams Jr. as Floyd (Stanley) Jackson
- Alltrinna Grayson as T.T. Jackson
- Myra Beasley as Michelle Smith
- Stephanie Ferrett as Becky
- Brandi Milton as Patrice Washington
- Jermaine Sellers as Oscar Smith
  - Donny Sykes (FILMED VERSION)
- Johnny Gilmore as Reverend Tank Washington
- Nicole Jackson as Lisa
- Timon Kyle Durrett as Ronald

== Band ==
- David Farmer - Musical Director / Keyboards
- John "L'Mo" Elmore - Keyboards / Sound Effects
- Terrell Sass - Drums / Drum Programming
- Phillip Muckle - Bass Guitar
- Marius "Moses" Staimez - Guitar
- Ryan Kilgore - Saxophone

== Musical Numbers ==
All songs written and/or produced by Tyler Perry and Elvin D. Ross.

1. "Gospel Medley"
  1. "Pass Me Not, O Gentle Saviour" - T.T.
  2. "This Little Light of Mine" - Roger
  3. "Down by the Riverside" - Judith
2. All You Need to Know - Lisa
3. "She's Gonna Find Another Man" - Floyd
4. "Between The Words" - Michelle
5. "You Only Get One" - T.T.
6. "When He Looks At You" - Reverend Tank
7. "I'm Sorry" - Oscar
8. "Love Songs Medley"
  1. "Love and Happiness" - Floyd
  2. "For the Love of You" - T.T. & Patrice
  3. "Fire and Desire" - Becky
9. "Shattered" - Judith
10. "Sometimes We Stay Too Long" - Roger

== Film adaptation ==
A film adaptation of the play, Temptation: Confessions of a Marriage Counselor, was filmed in 2012, and released in 2013. The film stars Jurnee Smollett, Lance Gross, Brandy and Kim Kardashian. The film is much darker in tone than the comedic approach of the play.
