= Alejandro Hernandez (actor) =

American actor

- Born: Trenton, New Jersey, U.S.
- Occupation: Actor
- Years active: 2010–present

Alejandro Hernandez is an American actor, known for playing Nurse Casey Acosta in the NBC medical drama series, New Amsterdam (2018–2023), and Luis Batista in the Amazon Prime Video black comedy-horror series, The Horror of Dolores Roach (2023).

== Life and career ==
Hernandez was born in Trenton, New Jersey, and raised in nearby Hamilton Township where he moved to when he was 12 years old. He is of Puerto Rican descent. He graduated from Steinert High School in 2008 and went on to graduate from Mercer County Community College in 2010 before transferring to Montclair State University where he earned a B.F.A. in Theatre. In 2015, He received further professional training as a member of the Acting Apprentice Company at Actors Theatre of Louisville, where he performed in Peter and the Starcatcher and Wondrous strange at the 40th Humana Festival of New American Plays. He began appearing on stage productions including Angels in America, Rent and Hedda Gabler.

Hernandez made his television debut in 2016 appearing in an episode of Fox series, Gotham. He later guest-starred on Madam Secretary, Sneaky Pete, Elementary, Blue Bloods and Law & Order: Special Victims Unit. In 2018, he had a recurring role during the first season of CBS crime drama series, Instinct. He made his film debut appearing in the 2018 crime thriller American Dreamer and later was cast in a recurring role as Nurse Casey Acosta in the NBC medical drama series, New Amsterdam. He appeared in total 64 episodes from 2018 through 2023. In 2022, he also had a recurring role on the short-lived Netflix legal drama, Partner Track.

In 2023, Hernandez was cast as Luis Batista in the Amazon Prime Video black comedy-horror series, The Horror of Dolores Roach opposite Justina Machado. He appeared as a guest star in Law and Order: SVU in 2026

== Filmography ==
Year	Title	Role	Notes
2016	Gotham	Herbalist	Episode: "Mad City: Red Queen"
2016	Madam Secretary	Francisco Suarez Jr.	Episode: "Tectonic Shift"
2017	Sneaky Pete	Jesus	Episode: "Lieutenant Bernhardt"
2017	Elementary	Mr. Salas	Episode: "Dead Man's Tale"
2017	Blue Bloods	Jose Pena	Episode: "The Thin Blue Line"
2018	Monster	Inmate	
2018	Lucid	Kyle	Short film
2018	Law & Order: Special Victims Unit	Bobby Jackson	Episode: "Guardian"
2018	Instinct	Det. Rafael Sosa	Recurring role, 7 episodes
2018	American Dreamer	Gumby	
2019	FBI	Tommy Chase	Episode: "Appearances"
2019	The Six	Alex	Short film
2020	Chicago P.D.	Roberto Diaz	Episode: "Fighting Ghosts"
2022	Partner Track	Valdo	Recurring role, 4 episodes
2018–2023	New Amsterdam	Nurse Casey Acosta	Recurring role, 64 episodes
2023	The Horror of Dolores Roach	Luis Batista	Series regular, 8 episodes
