= London Town (2016 film) =

- Theatrical release poster
- Directed by: Derrick Borte
- Written by: Matt Brown
- Produced by: Tom Butterfield; Sofia Sondervan; Christine Vachon
- Starring: Daniel Huttlestone; Dougray Scott; Natascha McElhone; Nell Williams; Jonathan Rhys Meyers
- Cinematography: Hubert Taczanowski
- Edited by: Brian Ufberg
- Music by: Bryan Senti
- Production companies: Dutch Tilt Film; Killer Films; Culmination Productions; Head Gear Films; Storyland Pictures; WeatherVane Productions
- Distributed by: IFC Films
- Release dates: June 3, 2016 (Los Angeles Film Festival); October 7, 2016 (United States)
- Running time: 92 minutes
- Countries: United States; United Kingdom
- Language: English

London Town is a 2016 drama film directed by Derrick Borte and written by Matt Brown. The film stars Daniel Huttlestone, Dougray Scott, Natascha McElhone, Nell Williams and Jonathan Rhys Meyers.

The film had its world premiere at the Los Angeles Film Festival on June 3, 2016. The film was released in a limited release and through video on demand on October 7, 2016, by IFC Films.

== Plot ==
In the late 1970s, Shay Baker (Daniel Huttlestone) is a 14-year-old boy from a working-class family in Wanstead. He divides his time between looking after his little sister Alice and working at the piano shop owned by his father Nick (Dougray Scott). His mother left the family years before, and, according to Nick, lives a bohemian, hedonistic life in London.

Nick sends Shay to pick up parts from a music supplier in London. On the train, Shay meets Vivian (Nell Williams), a punk girl listening to the Clash on her Walkman. Shay becomes fascinated by the band, and follows Vivian through London. Vivian explains the politics of punk, with the Clash supporting racial cooperation and working-class empowerment, whereas the skinheads advocate white power and support the neo-Nazi National Front. Vivian and Shay manage to get the last two tickets to a Clash concert for the following day. After returning home to Wanstead, Shay spends the night listening to the Clash's eponymous album, dying his hair from a light-brown mop-top to a black pompadour. He also begins to wear clothes influenced by punk culture: black jeans, red button-down shirts, and a leather jacket.

Nick becomes injured in an accident moving a piano and is hospitalized. Shay, wanting to go the concert, puts Alice to bed and leaves. He and Vivian attend the concert, where they kiss at the end of "Clash City Rockers". The concert is interrupted by skinheads and police, and Shay is beaten by a police officer while defending Vivian. Shay arrives home to find Alice gone, but finds that she had gone to a neighbor's house after finding herself alone.

Because of Nick's injuries, Shay finds the family falling behind on their payments. Shay decides to look after the shop as well as drive his father's taxi to make extra money while Vivian looks after Alice. With her help, Shay disguises himself as a woman to look old enough to drive. Late that night, he unknowingly picks up Joe Strummer (Jonathan Rhys Meyers). Strummer discovers Shay isn't a woman, and Shay confesses. They begin to talk about Shay's situation and his love of the Clash, still unaware of the identity of his passenger. Strummer gives him all the money in his wallet to pay for his fare. Shay returns home, and he and Vivian spend the night together.

Shay wakes the next morning to find Vivian gone, and Alice is sick. He also finds that the water and telephone lines are shut off, so he drives to his mother's London flat for help. As Alice rests, Shay discovers his mother's lifestyle as a singer, including sexual promiscuity and use of cocaine. Shay returns to the shop and discovers that he's been served with an eviction notice. In an attempt to get help from Vivian, he discovers that she actually comes from an upper-class family, living a comfortable life in a posh neighborhood in London, and is related to a "Thatcherite" spokesman, leading Shay to feel betrayed.

Shay, along with his mother's lover Johnny (Tom Hughes), goes to a concert in Victoria Park sponsored by the Anti-Nazi League to see the Clash again. In a violent confrontation between punks and skinheads, Shay is detained and thrown in jail. He soon finds himself sharing a cell with Strummer, who recognizes him from the taxi. After they are released, Strummer takes Shay to see the Clash rehearse some new material.

Shay recognizes that his mother's behavior is not suitable, and leaves with Alice. However, he finds that the taxi has been repossessed by the taxi company. In an attempt to raise money and pay off his family's debts, Shay sells the shop's pianos and converts it into a music store known as the Rock Shop, specializing in guitars and amplifiers. Even though he hasn't told Strummer about it, he advertises that the Clash would be playing at the grand opening of the Rock Shop. Nick is discharged from the hospital, and becomes angry when he discovers what Shay had done. Shay leaves home to spend the night at the shop, but discovers Vivian sitting on the sidewalk wanting to be first in line to see the Clash play. They reconcile and sleep on the shop floor. The following morning, they discover a crowd of punks has formed outside wanting to see the Clash. Nick and Alice arrive at the shop, with Nick approving of his son's work, saying that it should have been done a long time ago. Shay tries to appease the crowd, but Nick tells everyone that the Clash aren't coming. Just then, Joe Strummer emerges from the crowd with a guitar and plays "I Fought the Law" as the credits roll.

== Cast ==
- Daniel Huttlestone as Shay Baker
- Dougray Scott as Nick Baker
- Natascha McElhone as Sandrine
- Nell Williams as Vivian Daniels
- Jonathan Rhys Meyers as Joe Strummer
- Pete Morrow as Paul Simonon
- Tom Hughes as Johnny
- Sam Robertson as Tommy Gun
- Kerry Howard as Penelope
- Meredith Ostrom as Rebecca
- Paul Blackwell as Skinhead
- Jeff Leach as Ronnie
- Michael Chapman as Skinhead
- Alex Marx as Doctor
- Yasmine Akram as Nurse
- Leanne Faulkner as Rudy
- Alex Gold as Topper Headon
- David Antony Page as Mick Jones
- Anya McKenna-Bruce as Alice
- Peter Benedict as Sir Basil
- Samuel Fava as Jack
- Trevor Watts as Tow Truck Driver

== Production ==
In July 2013, it was announced Jonathan Rhys Meyers, Liv Tyler, and Daniel Huttlestone had been cast in the film, with Derrick Borte directing from a screenplay by Kristen Sheridan, Sonya Gildea, and Matthew Brown. In July 2015, Dougray Scott and Natascha McElhone were cast in the film. Sofia Sondervan, Christine Vachon, and Tom Butterfield served as producers through their Dutch Tilt Film, Killer Films, and Culmination Productions banners, respectively.

== Release ==
The film had its world premiere at the Los Angeles Film Festival on June 3, 2016. Shortly after, IFC Films acquired U.S distribution rights to the film. The film was released on October 7, 2016, by IFC Films.

=== Critical reception ===
London Town holds a 53% approval rating on review aggregator website Rotten Tomatoes based on 17 reviews; the average rating is 6.35/10. On Metacritic, the film holds a rating of 46 out of 100 based on seven critics, indicating "mixed or average" reviews.
