= Hurricane Season (2010 film) =

- DVD cover
- Directed by: Tim Story
- Written by: Robert Eisele
- Produced by: Raymond Brothers; Scott Glassgold
- Starring: Forest Whitaker; Taraji P. Henson; Bow Wow; Isaiah Washington; Robbie Jones; Jackie Long
- Cinematography: Larry Blanford
- Edited by: Stuart Levy
- Music by: Mark Mancina
- Production company: The Weinstein Company
- Distributed by: Dimension Films
- Release date: February 9, 2010
- Running time: 102 minutes
- Country: United States
- Language: English
- Budget: $15 million

Hurricane Season is a 2010 American sports drama film directed by Tim Story and starring Forest Whitaker, Taraji P. Henson, Isaiah Washington, Lil Wayne, and Bow Wow. The screenplay was written by Robert Eisele and the film was produced by Raymond Brothers and Scott Glassgold. The film had been delayed several times and was finally released to DVD on February 9, 2010.

== Plot ==
This movie is based on the true story of John Ehret High School's 2005–06 State championship team. After Hurricane Katrina, Al Collins (Forest Whitaker), a John Ehret high school basketball coach in Jefferson Parish, across the river from New Orleans in Marrero, Louisiana, assembles a team of players who had previously attended five different schools before Hurricane Katrina and leads them on the path to winning the state championship and rebuilding the community.

== Cast ==
- Forest Whitaker as Al Collins
- Jackie Long as JJ Coleman
- Taraji P. Henson as Dayna Collins
- China Anne McClain as Alana Collins
- Isaiah Washington as Coach Buddy Simmons
- Bonnie Hunt as Principal Durant
- Bow Wow as Gary Davisee
- Khleo Thomas as David Willis
- Robbie Jones as Brian Randolph
- Lil Wayne as Lamont Johnson
- Michael Gaston as Coach Frank Landon
- Courtney B. Vance as Mr. Randolph
- Irma P. Hall as Grandma Rose
- Marcus Lyle Brown as Spencer's Father
- Brian Hartley as Fan
- Laurie Lee as Fan
- J. B. Smoove as Sam, the Bus-driver
- Eric D. Hill as Christian Wall
- Jarod Einsohn as Randy Verdin
- Nick Washington as Nicholas Washington

== Music ==
The score for the film was composed by Mark Mancina. The theme song, "Be On Our Way" by Van Hunt feat. Supervision, Buku Wise, and Hidden Faces was written and produced by Frank Fitzpatrick. There was no official soundtrack release for the film, however proceeds from the "Be On Our Way" sales were donated to aid victims of the Hurricane Katrina disaster.

== See also ==
- List of basketball films
