= The Horror of Dolores Roach =

American TV series starring Justina Machado

- Genre: Dark comedy; Drama; Horror
- Created by: Aaron Mark
- Based on: Empanada Loca (play); The Horror of Dolores Roach (podcast)
- Starring: Justina Machado; Alejandro Hernandez; Kita Updike; K. Todd Freeman
- Music by: Siddhartha Khosla
- Country of origin: United States
- Original language: English
- No. of seasons: 1
- No. of episodes: 8

Production
- Executive producers: Jason Blum; Gloria Calderón Kellett; Roxann Dawson; Chris Dickie; Jeremy Gold; Aaron Mark; Chris McCumber; Justin McGoldrick; Mimi O'Donnell; Dawn Ostroff; Dara Resnik; Daphne Rubin-Vega
- Producers: Tina Grewal, Alexander Kruener
- Editors: Roslyn Kalloo; Jorge Weisz; Andrew Wesman
- Running time: 28–29 minutes
- Production companies: Amazon Studios; Blumhouse Productions; Gimlet Pictures; GloNation Studios; Spotify Studios

Original release
- Network: Amazon Prime Video
- Release: July 7, 2023

The Horror of Dolores Roach is an American black comedy horror series, starring Justina Machado in the title role. It is based on the one-woman off-Broadway play Empanada Loca and the podcast of the same name, created by Aaron Mark. The series was released on Prime Video on July 7, 2023. In November 2023, the series was canceled after one season.

== Synopsis ==
Dolores Roach is released after an unjust 16-year prison sentence, and she returns to a now-gentrified Washington Heights neighborhood. She reunites with an old stoner friend, Luis, who lets her live and work as a masseuse in the basement under his empanada shop. When the promise of her newfound stability is threatened, she must go to extremes to survive.

== Cast ==
- Justina Machado as Dolores Roach, a recently released convict who spent sixteen years behind bars for possession of marijuana. Setting up a small massage parlor to support herself, she eventually begins killing her clients. Her character is partially inspired by Sweeney Todd.
- Alejandro Hernandez as Luis Batista, a cook and owner of Empanada Loca, a small restaurant above Dolores' parlor. He is gradually revealed to have cannibalistic tendencies and helps Dolores (whom he is smitten with) cover up her murders by turning her victims' remains into food. His character is partially inspired by Mrs. Lovett.
- Kita Updike as Nellie Morris, a cashier and server at Empanada Loca.
- K. Todd Freeman as Jeremiah, a driver for a meat company that previously supplied Luis' restaurant. He is one of the first to suspect that something is not right with Empanada Loca.
- Marc Maron as Gideon Pearlman, the abusive and racist landlord who owns the building where Empanada Loca is situated. He becomes Dolores' first victim.
- Ilan Eskenazi as Jonah Pearlman, Gideon's son and business associate. Dolores kills him after he finds his father's corpse in the restaurant's meat locker.
- Judy Reyes as Marcie, a drug dealer who knew Dolores before she went to prison and winds up becoming one of her victims. Her character is partially inspired by Adolfo Pirelli.
- Jessica Pimentel as Flora Frias, a playwright who turns a fictionalized account of Dolores' crimes into her latest work.
- Jean Yoon as Joy, Dolores' old neighbor who helps her set up the parlor.
- Jeffery Self as Caleb Sweetzer, the showrunner of Flora's play.
- Cyndi Lauper as Ruthie, a reformed convict and amateur private investigator who uncovers Dolores and Luis' murders and is subsequently killed by Dolores.
- Kate Beahan as Georgina Bellyard
- Maureen Cassidy as Tabitha, a disabled convict and Dolores' former cellmate who taught her how to kill.

== Episodes ==
No.	Title	Directed by	Teleplay by	Original release date
1	"They Called Me Magic Hands"	Roxann Dawson	Aaron Mark	July 7, 2023
Flora Frias stages a successful play about the crimes of Dolores Roach. While she is alone in her changing room, Dolores catches her alone and forces Flora to listen to her story. In 2003, Dolores was caught selling weed for her boyfriend Dominic and sentenced to 16 years in prison. When she leaves prison in 2019, her neighborhood, Washington Heights, has been transformed by gentrification, and the only recognizable place is the shop Empanada Loca, ran by her old friend Luis Batista. Luis offers to let her live in the basement under the shop.
2	"This Building's Gonna Be the Death of Me"	Edward Ornelas	Aaron Mark & Daphne Rubin-Vega	July 7, 2023
Dolores attempts to find a job, to no avail, as no one will hire a former prison inmate. Luis then begins to advertise Dolores' masseuse services, and Dolores begins to find success in her work. Luis has no rent to pay to his new landlord, Gideon Perlman (Marc Maron), who threatens to throw them out. Dolores offers him a small sum of money to delay their eviction by a week, and begins to give him a massage. Gideon launches into a racist rant and tries to touch Dolores, which enrages her. Dolores then strangles Gideon.
3	"Like a Stoned-Ass Baby"	America Young	Aaron Mark & Dara Resnik	July 7, 2023
Dolores panics about what to do with Gideon's dead body, especially when she leaves the shop temporarily and finds his corpse missing. The next day, Empanada Loca begins selling a popular new sort of empanada called "Muy Loco" filled with a mystery meat. Dolores realizes the mystery meat is Gideon himself. Luis confesses his feelings for Dolores. Everything seems to be going well, up until Jonah, Gideon's son, appears at the shop with the police.
4	"Bitch, I've Already Been to Prison"	America Young	Aaron Mark & Brian Otaño	July 7, 2023
Jonah asks Luis where his father went. Luis says that he only spoke to Gideon over the phone, and then tricks Jonah into eating the empanadas made of his father. Dolores sets the rest of Gideon's remains on fire, causing the Muy Loco empanadas to sell out. She meets an old drug dealer rival, Marcie, and gives her a massage. Marcie vandalizes Dolores' massage space and reveals that Dominic set her up for the drug bust 16 years ago, and mocks her by saying that Dominic was unfaithful to her. Dolores, enraged, attacks Marcie and snaps her neck. Luis once again has a source of meat for his Muy Loco empanadas. Dolores visits her old flame, Tabitha, in prison and asks her to help her find Dominic.
5	"I Never Don't Find 'Em"	Hiromi Kamata	Aaron Mark & Mariah Wilson	July 7, 2023
Tabitha's friend, Ruthie, agrees to help Dolores find Dominic. She discovers that Dominic had died already in the Dominican Republic in 2007, 4 years after Dolores was first locked up. Jonah begins searching for his father in earnest, and Ruthie agrees to help Jonah find his father. Luis impersonates Gideon, tricking Jonah into thinking Gideon is still alive, who then calls off Ruthie. Luis performs oral sex on Dolores. He reveals to Dolores that Dominic never died in the Dominican Republic.
6	"Blink Twice"	Hiromi Kamata	Michelle Badillo & Dara Resnik	July 7, 2023
Dolores tries to speak to Dominic's grandmother's friend, Sophia, to find out the whereabouts of Dominic, but Sophia refuses to talk. One of Marcie's employees, Hector, signs up for a massage from Dolores. She accidentally triggers his severe nut allergies and, not knowing how to use an epipen, he seemingly dies within minutes. She attempts to alert Luis, who acts suspiciously in front of a health inspector there to inspect the shop. Ruthie confronts Dolores in the basement, revealing she figured out what happened to Gideon. She sees Hector's dead body and tries to run, but Dolores catches her and tazes her. Hector wakes up, and Dolores stabs him to death and strangles Ruthie. Jeremiah, a trucker and Luis' former meat supplier, reveals to Dolores he's realized she kills people for Luis' empanadas and offers to take her far away from New York to start a new life. Dolores returns to Luis and asks him to sell his shop so that they can run away together and start a new life.
7	"Bye, Felicia"	Eduardo Sánchez	Joe Hortua & Dara Resnik	July 7, 2023
Luis and Dolores strike a deal with Jonah to sell the shop to him, and plan to move to Colorado under new names. The tenants of the apartment start noticing copious amounts of blood flowing from the pipes instead of water. Sophia reveals to Dolores that Dominic was with a white Australian girl, which Dolores believes to be her old friend Georgina. Georgina denies knowing anything about Dominic. Dolores promises to Luis to forget about Dominic. She tries to entice him to have sex with her and discovers he's castrated. He reveals he did it to himself as a result of sexual trauma inflicted on him as a child. Jonah enters the freezer and discovers his father's corpse. Dolores snaps his neck.
8	"Stop Me"	Eduardo Sánchez	Aaron Mark	July 7, 2023
Luis and Dolores make frantic plans to leave New York as suspicion against them mounts. A friend of Dolores confronts her and asks her for a massage. She inadvertently upsets Dolores and Dolores snaps her neck. Luis frames Nellie, a worker in the shop, for the murders. Jeremiah enters the basement and tries to find the bodies. Luis kills him. Dolores tries to run and is stopped by Luis. She sets him and the kitchen on fire, and uses Jeremiah's truck to run away, leaving everyone to believe she's dead. In the present day, she concludes her conversation with Flora Frias, and declares her intent to find Dominic. She forces Caleb, the showrunner of the play that Flora ran, to drive her to Dominic's home. The final shot of the show is Dolores laughing hysterically before staring into the camera and "killing" the audience.

== Development ==
On May 6, 2020, it was reported that Blumhouse Television was adapting The Horror of Dolores Roach, a Gimlet Media podcast, as a drama series in development for Amazon Studios. Dara Resnik is the showrunner, working alongside Aaron Mark, creator of the podcast, who would be adapting the series from his own script. The podcast is based on Mark's one-woman off-Broadway play Empanada Loca, starring Daphne Rubin-Vega, which Mark subsequently adapted into a podcast, also starring Rubin-Vega.

Amazon Studios gave a pilot order for the series in June 2021, and on February 3, 2022, it was reported that Amazon had given it a series order.

== Production ==
The 8-episode series is executive produced by Mark, Resnik, Rubin-Vega, Jason Blum, Chris McCumber, Jeremy Gold, Justin McGoldrick, Dawn Ostroff, Mimi O'Donnell, Gloria Calderón Kellett, and Roxann Dawson. Dawson directed the pilot episode, which was written by Mark.

On February 3, 2022, it was reported that the series would star Justina Machado, Alejandro Hernandez, Kita Updike, and K. Todd Freeman. On June 29, 2022, it was announced that Marc Maron, Jean Yoon, Judy Reyes, and Jeffery Self had joined the cast in recurring roles. On August 1, 2022, it was reported that Cyndi Lauper had joined the cast in a recurring guest role.

On November 21, 2023, it was reported that the series was canceled after one season.

== Release ==
The first three episodes premiered on June 15, 2023, at the Tribeca Film Festival as part of its Festival TV lineup. The series was released on Prime Video on July 7, 2023.

=== Reception ===
The series received generally positive reviews, with Machado's performance being widely praised.

On Rotten Tomatoes, the first season of the show garnered a 79% score from critics, a "positive" score, with the critic's consensus being "The Horror of Dolores Roach bites off more than it could chew with the delicate balance between horror and humor, but Justina Machado's commitment to the zany premise makes for a savory snack of a series."

Joel Golby, writing for The Guardian, called it a "hugely fun drama" and praised the tone and originality of the series. The A.V. Club also gave a positive review, commenting: "The right combo of love, betrayal, murder, and cannibalism gets emulsified with commentary on mass incarceration, gentrification, and classism. It’s a chaotic task to juggle all of that over the course of eight under-30-minute episodes. Yet The Horror Of Dolores Roach pulls it off, presenting a darkly comedic and horrifying character study in the process." Angie Han of The Hollywood Reporter praised Machado and Hernandez' performance, but criticized what she perceived as the missed potential of the show. Cristina Escobar of rogerebert.com commented "A playful show about a serial killer, "The Horror of Dolores Roach" gets its frights by not taking itself too seriously." Entertainment Weekly gave the show a score of B+ on a scale from A to F.

Conversely, Jack Seale, also writing for The Guardian, gave a negative review, calling the series a "sloppy mess" while praising Machado's performance. Variety also gave a negative review, writing "Advertised as a horror comedy, “The Horror of Dolores Roach” effectively earns neither scares nor laughs." Brian Lowry, writing for CNN, gave a negative review, writing that the show had a "killer concept" but failed to live up to the concept.
