= The Get Out =

Film by Derrick Borte

- Theatrical release poster
- Directed by: Derrick Borte
- Screenplay by: Derrick Borte; Daniel Forte
- Based on: Strip by Thomas Perry
- Produced by: Mark Fasano; Jeffrey Greenstein; Deborah Glover; Mark Bower
- Starring: Russell Crowe; Luke Evans; Teresa Palmer; Danny Zovatto; Josh McConville; Nina Dobrev; Aaron Paul
- Cinematography: Brendan Galvin
- Edited by: Mark Warner
- Music by: Bryan Senti
- Production companies: Fifth Season; Nickel City Pictures; A Higher Standard; Life & Soul Pictures; G2 Dispatch
- Distributed by: Vertical
- Release date: June 26, 2026
- Running time: 101 minutes
- Countries: Australia; United States
- Language: English

The Get Out is a 2026 action crime thriller film directed by Derrick Borte. It stars Russell Crowe, Luke Evans, Teresa Palmer, Danny Zovatto, Josh McConville, Nina Dobrev, and Aaron Paul. The screenplay by Borte and Daniel Forte is based on the 2010 novel Strip by Thomas Perry.

== Plot ==
Manco Kapak is an Albanian nightclub boss that serves as a money laundering front for the cartel. While having sex with his girlfriend Sunny, Kapak suffers a heart attack, and his doctor informs him it may be time to retire. Kapak begins looking to sell the club to his friend Joe, unaware that he is a undercover FBI agent.

While depositing the cartel's funds, Kapak is robbed at gunpoint by Jeff. The police are called and Detective Slosser tells the couple that it is unlikely to be solved. Slosser is revealed to be covering for Jeff and the reason for the burglary - Jeff, a professor, sold a college admission essay to Slosser for his son. The son failed at getting into his desired college, leading to Slosser blackmailing Jeff for tuition money. Slosser informs Jeff he needs to rob Kapak again.

At a bank, Jeff deposits a portion of the stolen cash, and is caught by Carrie, a bank teller. Blackmailing him, Carrie joins in on the next robbery scheme. At the nightclub, Rodriguez, who has learned of the robbery, threatens Kapak to not mess up again. While depositing that night's funds, Jeff and Carrie successfully rob Kapak, leading to a car chase. The two go to a hotel to have sex and the next morning Jeff awakes to learn that Carrie gambled all the money away.

Irena, a money mule, tells Kapak that Rodriguez wishes to see him and is photographed by a FBI agent as he leaves the building, who informs Joe. During the drive, Kapak demands to know what will happen when they arrive and Irena holds him at gunpoint until Kapak talks her down. Kapak offers to sell the club to Rodriguez to settle the money situation, but Rodriguez orders one of his henchmen to kill him. A rock is thrown through the window by Joe, allowing Kapak to kill Rodriguez, the henchmen, and his wife. Kapak tells Irena to go home and burns down the house to destroy the evidence.

Kapak's employee, Spence, takes Sunny hostage while attempting to steal the club cash. Jeff and Carrie arrive to rob the nightclub. Carrie kills Spence in a shootout, and the two drive away after hearing a police siren. Distraught, Carrie throws out the money, causing Jeff to crash the car. Jeff dies on impact and Carrie escapes just as the car explodes.

The next morning, Sunny informs Kapak about the robbery and the two plan to escape to Canada. At the airport, Slosser holds the couple at gunpoint, but is saved by Joe, who reveals that Carrie was picked up by the police and informed them of Slosser's blackmail scheme. A standoff ensues and Joe is wounded in the arm. In a fight, Kapak shoots Slosser in the chest, killing him.

Joe reveals he was planning to buy the club to get to Rodriguez's boss, a cartel leader named El Burro, and that he was the one to throw the rock. He also informs them that Slosser will be incriminated for killing Rodriguez. Kapak signs the club over and the couple leave as Joe gives them back the money.

== Cast ==
- Russell Crowe as Manco Kapak, a nightclub owner
- Luke Evans as Joe Carver, an undercover federal agent
- Aaron Paul as Jeff, a university professor
- Josh McConville as Slosser, a crooked cop
- Nina Dobrev as Carrie, a bank teller
- Teresa Palmer as Sunny, Manco's girlfriend
- Danny Zovatto as Miguel Rodriguez, the cartel's main guy in Los Angeles
- Benedict Hardie as Spence, Kapak's employee
- Kartiah Vergara as Irena, a money mule

== Production ==
The film is written and directed by Derrick Borte who wrote the screenplay alongside Daniel Forte based on Thomas Perry's novel Strip. Mark Fasano of Nickel City Pictures will produce with Jeffrey Greenstein of A Higher Standard, Mark Bower and Bruno Mustic of Life & Soul Pictures, and David Lipper and Robert A. Daly Jr. of Latigo films who co-financed the film with Gramercy Park Media.

Russell Crowe was attached to the lead role in May 2024. Kartiah Vergara, Nina Dobrev, and Teresa Palmer joined the cast in February 2025. Principal photography got underway that month in Queensland, Australia. The production is supported by Screen Queensland through their Production Attraction Strategy, the City of Gold Coast and by the Australian Government through the Location Offset. Aaron Paul, Luke Evans, and Daniel Zovatto joined in March 2025.

== Release ==
The Get Out was released in select theaters and on video on demand by Vertical on June 26, 2026.

== Reception ==
On the review aggregator website Rotten Tomatoes, 50% of 32 critics' reviews are positive, with an average rating of 5.4/10. Metacritic, which uses a weighted average, assigned the film a score of 49 out of 100, based on 6 critics, indicating "mixed or average" reviews.
