= Inland (film) =

2022 British film

- Directed by: Fridtjof Ryder
- Screenplay by: Fritdjof Ryder
- Produced by: Henry Richmond; Louis Paine; Fridtjof Ryder
- Starring: Mark Rylance; Rory Alexander; Kathryn Hunter
- Cinematography: Ravi Doubleday
- Edited by: Lincoln Witter; Joe Walton
- Music by: Bartholomew Mason
- Production companies: Twenty 20 Media; Fablemaze; DVA Films; Shakespeare Road; Zebrafish Media
- Distributed by: Verve Pictures
- Release dates: 14 October 2022 (London); 16 June 2023 (United Kingdom)
- Running time: 82 minutes
- Country: United Kingdom
- Language: English
- Box office: $17,685

Inland is a 2022 British independent fantasy drama film written, directed and produced by Fridtjof Ryder, in his feature length debut. The film stars Mark Rylance, who also served as an executive producer, Rory Alexander and Kathryn Hunter. It premiered at the 66th BFI London Film Festival on 14 October 2022, before being released in select UK cinemas on 16 June 2023.

== Synopsis ==
In Gloucester, a young man (Alexander) is taken back under the wing of an older gentleman Dunleavy (Rylance), upon the younger man's return from time spent in a psychiatric unit.

== Cast ==
- Rory Alexander as Man
- Mark Rylance as Dunleavy
- Kathryn Hunter as Eliza 'Lizzie' Heron
- Shaun Dingwall as John
- Nell Williams as Daisy
- Alexander Lincoln as Tom
- Sebastian Orozco as Toby

== Production ==
The film marks the feature length directorial debut of Fridtjof Ryder. It is produced by Henry Richmond, Louis Paine and Ryder for Twenty 20 Media, Fablemaze, Fatcontman, Dva Films, Shakespeare Road and Zebrafish Media. The project has executive producers that include Trudie Styler, Sam Tromans, Ian Dawson, Zak Brilliant, Guy Davies, Matt Cook, Toby Cook, Thomas Atherton, Dougal Mackenzie Smith, Shaun Dingwall and Mark Rylance.

The project was set and filmed in Ryder's hometown of Gloucester, England, which he described as "a half-rural, half-town space".

== Release ==
The film premiered at the 66th BFI London Film Festival on 14 October 2022, and was released in select UK cinemas on 16 June 2023.

== Reception ==
On the review aggregator website Rotten Tomatoes, Inland holds an approval rating of 50% based on 18 reviews. The film was described as "a lyrical and troubling psychological drama" in The Guardian. Nikki Baughan described the film having "arresting visual language" in Screen Daily, which "draws on elements of traditional folklore and Lynchian influences". Anna Smith for Deadline Hollywood said "The enigmatic narrative won't be for everyone, but there is no doubt about the quality of the filmmaking".
