= Nell Williams =

English actress (born 1998)

- Williams in 2025
- Born: Nell Marmalade Baxendale-Williams; 13 September 1998 (age 28); Hackney, London, England
- Occupation: Actress
- Years active: 2012–present
- Parents: David L. Williams (father); Helen Baxendale (mother)

Nell Marmalade Baxendale-Williams (born 13 September 1998), known as Nell Williams, is an English actress. In 2015, she portrayed a teen version of Cersei Lannister in the opening episode of Season 5 of the HBO series Game of Thrones. She starred in Blinded by the Light (2019), which received rave reviews at the Sundance Film Festival, in the BAFTA winning film Elizabeth is Missing (2019), and in the film London Town (2016).

She played Glen Powell's teenage mother, Mary Redfellow in A24's How To Make A Killing (2026), and played Agatha in the Amazon MGM Studios series Young Sherlock (2026).

== Early life ==
She was born Nell Marmalade Elizabeth Baxendale-Williams on 13 September 1998 in Hackney, London, England. She is the first child of British-American film director David L. Williams and the English actress Helen Baxendale. She has two brothers.

== Career ==
=== Acting ===
Williams was scouted in a National Youth Music Theatre production aged 11. She was cast in Caryl Churchill's Love and Information at the Royal Court Theatre, and played the Young Queen Elizabeth II in Peter Morgan's The Audience in the Gielgud Theatre, for which she received widespread recognition from national and international media.

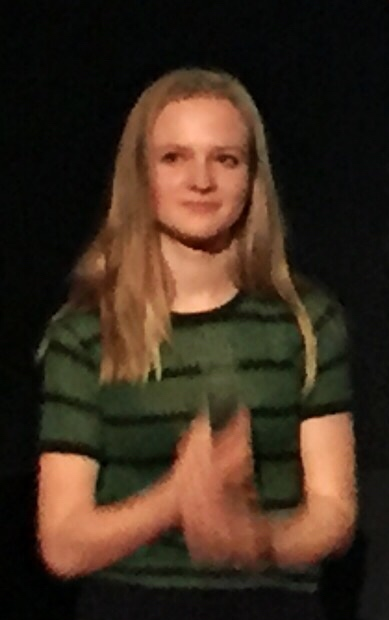
Williams at London Town BFI premiere 2016

In 2015, she portrayed a teen version of Cersei Lannister in the opening episode of Season 5 of the HBO series Game of Thrones. She starred in Blinded by the Light which received rave reviews at the Sundance Film Festival in 2019.

She appeared in The Good Liar, and starred in Elizabeth Is Missing, which received BAFTA nominations for Best Single Drama, and won a Best Actress for Jackson. Williams received widespread praise for her "sterling" supporting performance as "rebellious Katy".

In 2022 she played in British independent breakthrough feature Inland, playing next to Mark Rylance, directed by 20 year old Fridtjof Ryder.

Williams' leading role as The Bride in Barney Norris' adaptation of Lorca's Blood Wedding, and her performance in the Arcola main stage's Don't Destroy Me earned her critical acclaim.

She is set to star in independent British folk horror feature film Deepest Darkest alongside Aggy K Adams.

Williams played Glen Powell's teenage mother, Mary Redfellow in A24's How to Make a Killing (2026). She played Agatha in Young Sherlock.

=== Art ===
While in education, Williams's painting was selected by Wolfgang Tillmans to exhibit at the Royal Academy of Art summer exhibition.

== Filmography ==
=== Film ===
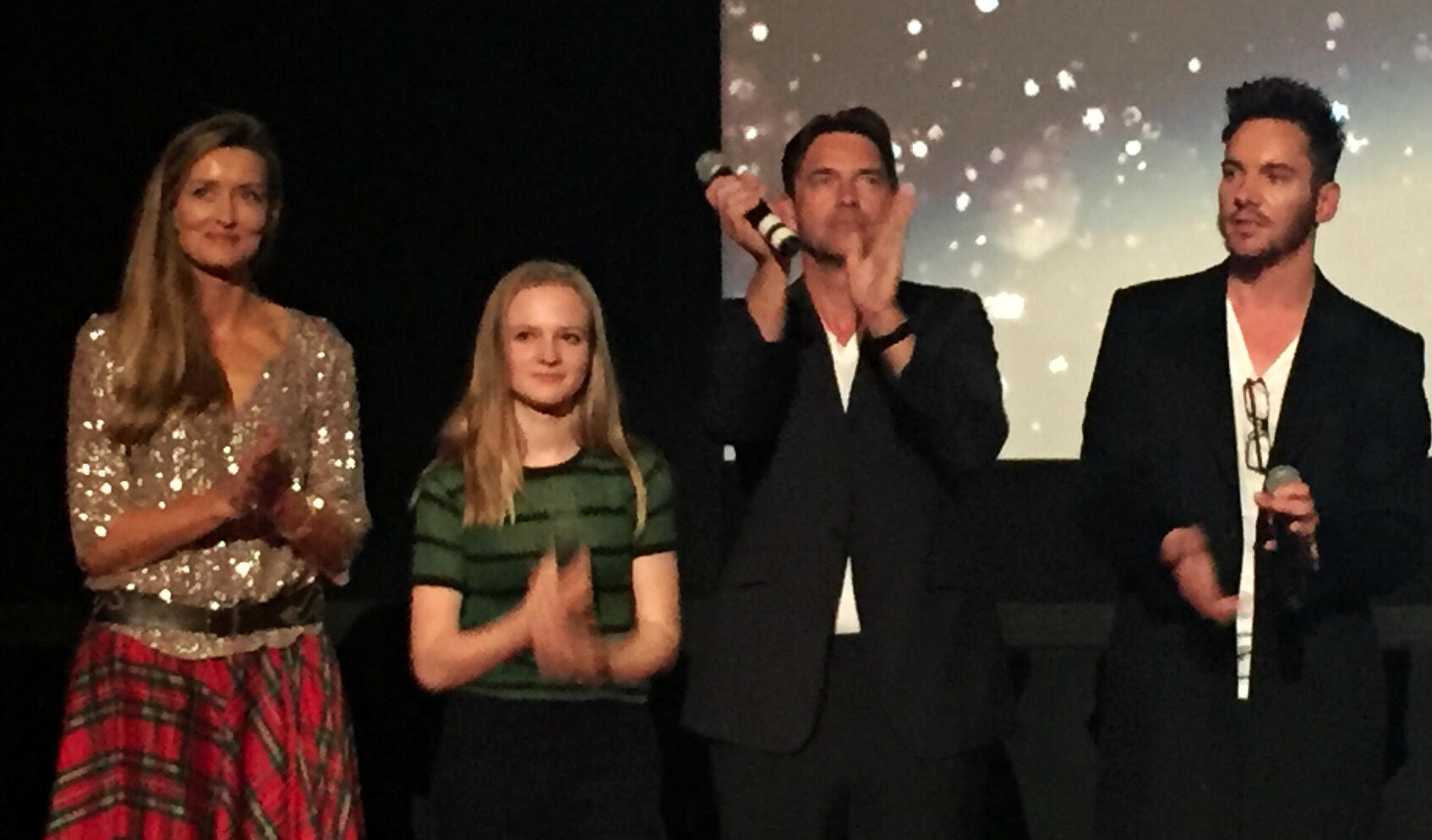
Cast of London Town European premiere, BFI London Film Festival 2016

| Year | Title | Role | Notes |
|---|---|---|---|
| 2016 | London Town | Vivian Daniels | Premiered at 2016 Los Angeles Film Festival |
| 2019 | Blinded by the Light | Eliza | Premiered at 2019 Sundance Film Festival |
| 2019 | The Good Liar | Lili | Warner Bros and Bron Studios. |
| 2022 | Inland | Daisy | Premiered at 2022 London Film Festival |
| 2026 | How to Make a Killing | Mary Redfellow | A24 and Studio Canal |
| 2027 | Deepest Darkest | Lila | Filming currently |

=== Television ===
| Year | Title | Role | Notes |
|---|---|---|---|
| 2012 | The Revolting World of Stanley Brown | Jess | 12 episodes |
| 2012 | Loving Miss Hatto | Young Birdy | Television film |
| 2013 | National Theatre Live | Elizabeth (teen) | Episode: "The Audience" |
| 2015 | Game of Thrones | Cersei Lannister (teen) | Season 5 Episode: "The Wars to Come" |
| 2016 | Grantchester | Gilly Bradley | Episode #2.6 |
| 2017 | Will | Agnes Austen | Episode: "The Two Gentlemen" |
| 2019 | Deep Water | Sally Kallisto | ITV. 6 episodes |
| 2019 | Elizabeth Is Missing | Katy | Television film |
| 2022 | We Hunt Together | Maisie McBride | Episode: "202" |
| 2026 | Young Sherlock | Agatha | Episode: #1.5 |

== Theatre ==
| Year | Title | Role | Notes |
|---|---|---|---|
| 2012 | Love and Information | | Royal Court Theatre, London, 2012 |
| 2013 | The Audience | Princess Elizabeth | Gielgud Theatre, London, 2013 |
| 2024 | Don't Destroy Me | | Arcola Theatre, London, 2024 |
| 2025 | Blood Wedding | The Bride | |
