= Curt Truninger =

Swiss film director (born 1957)

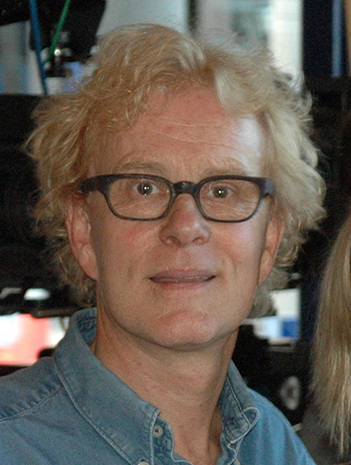
- Truninger in 2007
- Born: 12 April 1957 (age 69); Lucerne, Switzerland
- Occupations: Film director, screenwriter, producer, visual artist, actor

Curt Truninger (born 1957) is a Swiss filmmaker, screenplay writer and producer. He also works as a visual artist, journalist and occasional actor. He divides his time between Toronto and Zurich.

Curt Truninger is a Member of the European Film Academy.

== Biography ==
=== Personal life ===
Truninger was raised in Lucerne, at the time an international centre for the visual arts. His father Ernst worked as a banker and in the travel business. His grandfather Ernst was a popular local politician, and restaurateur.

Truninger developed an interest in film at an early age, especially the French cinema of Eric Rohmer, Francois Truffaut, and Andre Cayatte. As a teenager he met the renowned American photographer and editor of Camera magazine, Allan Porter, who kindled within him a love of photography and the associated arts. Through his mentorship with Porter, Truninger was introduced to many celebrated media and arts figures such as: Oliviero Toscani, Jann Wenner, and Timothy Leary. Truninger was also a UNICEF Ambassador and is an accomplished amateur athlete.

=== Work life ===
After studying social sciences and art history at LMU Munich, he graduated with a PhD from the University of Aberdeen, where he also taught. During this time Truninger was a member of "Chatham House" the think tank officially known as the Royal Institute of International Affairs in London. After leaving academia, Truninger returned briefly to Switzerland, where he worked for the Swiss public broadcaster SRF. During the 1980s he was host of the film programme Neu im Kino, and honed his writing skills working for Swiss and German print media as a film, cultural critic, and photographer. He then went to Munich, where he worked for the Bavarian Public Broadcaster BR, contributing to their Foreign Affairs programmes such as Weltspiegel. Soon thereafter, legendary German television journalist Reinhard Hoffmeister, lured Truninger to join the team of the Arts programme Aspekte. At the German Broadcaster ZDF he also wrote and directed documentaries and docu-dramas. Concurrently he hosted the talk show "Begegnungen", which was broadcast in all of Europe's German-speaking regions. As a respected television journalist Truninger was granted unique access to the TV series Wagner where he conducted one of the last on-camera interviews with ailing star Richard Burton. His freelance work includes a documentary portrait of Richard Avedon, produced in collaboration with the iconic photographer himself.

After a brief excursion directing music videos, Truninger made the leap to feature films in 1996 with Waiting for Michelangelo, a critically acclaimed romantic comedy about four friends lucky in life but unlucky in love. It featured popular Canadian star Roy Dupuis, and was shot in Toronto and Lucerne. The film, distributed by Channel 4 in London, went on to become one of the most widely distributed Swiss films. Truninger also co-wrote the original screenplay with his producer Margrit Ritzmann.

In 2001, he made his second feature film Dead By Monday, a black romantic comedy about love and suicide, starring Helen Baxendale (Friends, Cold Feet) and Tim Dutton (Ally McBeal, Bourne Identity). The film had its theatrical premiere in Italy and went on to win first prize at both the Portland Festival of World Cinema and the Monaco Film Festival. It was co-produced with Wim Wenders' production company Road Movies Berlin.

In 2008, Truninger and Ritzmann adapted the play What Happened Was by New York actor/playwright Tom Noonan, into the feature film The Rendezvous, starring Eva Birthistle (Ae Fond Kiss, Nightwatching) and Tim Dutton. The Rendezvous is a dark comic drama about two single legal co-workers whose attempt at a romantic evening result in an amusingly awkward revelation. The World Premiere took place at the Zurich Film Festival in October 2010. The film had its Canadian Premiere in Toronto in June 2011. The US premiere took place at the Myrtle Beach International Film Festival in South Carolina in spring 2012, where it won the Best Drama and Best Actress awards. As a result, it received US theatrical release in October 2012.

Also in 2012, Truninger contributed one of his paintings to the group show (Songbird ART) in Davos, Switzerland during the WEF. For his film The Rendezvous, Truninger also worked as the Production Designer under the alias of Sepp de Engelberg.

== Awards ==
Dead By Monday won Best Feature Film at the Portland Film Festival of World Cinema in 2001 and in 2003 the Angel Award for Best Picture at the Monaco Film Festival. The Rendezvous won Best Drama and Best Actress at the Myrtle Beach International Film Festival, South Carolina, 2012

== Filmography (writer-director) ==
=== Feature films ===
- 1996 Waiting for Michelangelo
- 2001 Dead By Monday
- 2010 The Rendezvous

=== Longform documentaries (selected) ===
- 1984 Dialekt-Rock (Swiss TV, SF 1)
- 1986 Engadin: Ein Paradies verändert sich (German TV, ZDF)
- 1987 Das Tessin der Tessiner (German TV, ZDF)
- 1988 Nostalgie auf Zelluloid (German TV, ZDF)
- 1989 Risorgimento der Phantasie (German TV, ZDF, Co-Dir.)
- 1989 Kanonen für den Osterschnee (German TV, ZDF)
- 1990 Geschichte des Semmering (German TV, ZDF)
- 1990 Das Sofa im Park (Swiss TV, SF DRS)
- 1991 Avedon - Kunsthaus Zürich (Producer: Richard Avedon)
- 1992 Uluruh (longform music video)
- 1993 Chaos am Matterhorn (German TV, ZDF/3sat)
- 1994 Dimitris Atelier (mini-series Swiss TV SF DRS)
