= Helen Baxendale =

English actress (born 1970)

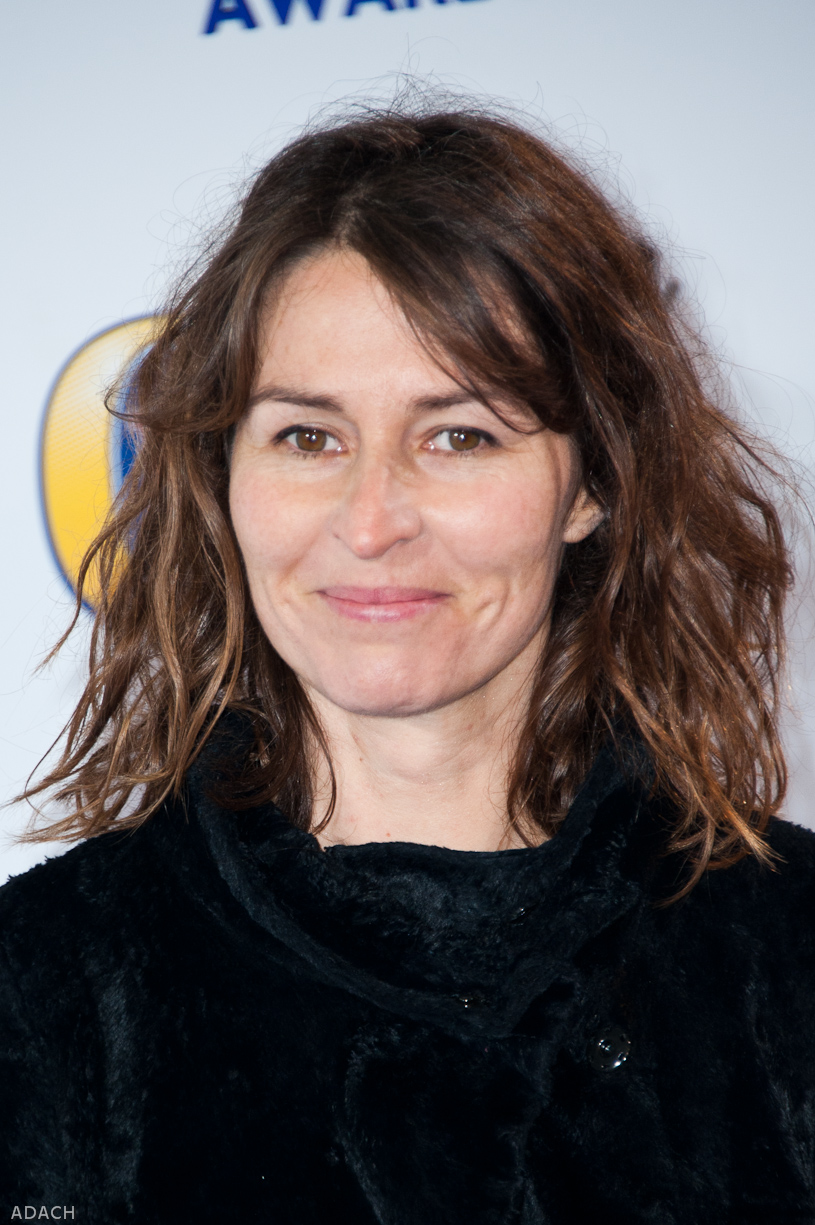
- Baxendale in 2013
- Born: Helen Victoria Baxendale; 7 June 1970 (age 56); Pontefract, West Riding of Yorkshire, England
- Occupations: Actress; film producer
- Years active: 1991–present
- Spouse: David L. Williams (m. 1993)
- Children: 3; including Nell Williams

Helen Victoria Baxendale (born 7 June 1970) is an English actress of stage and television. She is known for her roles as Rachel Bradley in the British comedy drama Cold Feet (1997–2003) and Emily Waltham in the American sitcom Friends (1998–1999). Her other television credits include Cardiac Arrest (1994–1996), An Unsuitable Job for a Woman (1997–1999), Adrian Mole: The Cappuccino Years (2001), Cuckoo (2012–2019) and Noughts + Crosses (2020).

Baxendale's early stage credits include The Soldiers at Glasgow's Citizens Theatre, which earned her a 1993 Ian Charleson Award nomination.

== Early life ==
Baxendale was born on 7 June 1970 in Pontefract, West Riding of Yorkshire. Baxendale's parents were teachers at a comprehensive school. Her sister is the screenwriter Katie Baxendale.

She grew up in Shenstone, Staffordshire, and attended King Edward VI School, Lichfield. She wanted to be a ballet dancer and trained at the Elmhurst School for Dance, until dropping out aged 17 in favour of an acting career. She moved to the Bristol Old Vic Theatre School, then worked at the Glasgow Citizens' Theatre from 1992 to 1995.

== Career ==
=== Television ===
==== Early television ====
Via her work at Glasgow Citizens' Theatre, Baxendale was cast in hospital TV series Cardiac Arrest, though it was not her first television role. Her performance as Dr Claire Maitland earned her a Scottish BAFTA nomination in 1995. Her role as Rachel Bradley in the TV series Cold Feet garnered her a British Comedy Award nomination. She starred in An Unsuitable Job for a Woman, playing Cordelia Gray. The Independent stated: "her early roles were defined by icy cool, sleek bobs and ironic detachment."

==== Friends ====
Aged 27, Baxendale was cast in a recurring role in Friends as Ross Geller's girlfriend, wife and ultimately ex-wife Emily Waltham. She appeared in fourteen episodes throughout Season 4 and early Season 5. Speaking to The Independent in 2022, Baxendale said "I saw those people in Friends, for example, and thought: I don't think that life is really what I want. They were hounded. They weren't able to walk into a supermarket and buy something..." On the attention she received for being in Friends, she said, "This thing… this programme that I happened to be in for a few episodes. The whole thing was bonkers." Director James Burrows said about Baxendale "...was nice but not particularly funny. Schwimmer had no one to bounce off. It was like clapping with one hand."

==== Post Friends ====
Other notable roles include Lorna Johnson in Truth or Dare alongside John Hannah, Caroline Meagher in The Investigator alongside Laura Fraser, and Julie Matthews in Curt Truninger's Dead by Monday. She was nominated for another Scottish BAFTA in 1997 for her role as Lorna Johnson. Dead by Monday won the Angel Award for Best Film at the Monaco International Film Festival in 2003 and the Portland Festival of World Cinema award for best feature film in 2001. She played Pandora Braithwaite in Adrian Mole: The Cappuccino Years in 2001 and "Maggie" in the multiple award-winning Bolse Vita. She appeared in Saving Nellie, a physics programme running on Teachers TV. From 2007 to January 2008, she starred in Swimming with Sharks alongside Christian Slater at London's Vaudeville Theatre.

In 2010, Baxendale appeared in the pilot episode of Dirk Gently as Susan Harmison. In January 2011, she co-starred with Trevor Eve in the three-part ITV drama Kidnap and Ransom, filmed on location in South Africa. Later in 2011, she starred as DCI Marion Bettany in Val McDermid's radio crime drama Village SOS. In 2012, she reprised her role in the second episode. She then appeared in the Inspector George Gently episode "The Lost Child" alongside Mark Gatiss. From 2012 to 2019, she starred in Cuckoo as Lorna, the mother in-law of the titular Dale 'Cuckoo' Ashbrick. In 2020, she played housekeeper Meggie McGregor in Noughts + Crosses.

=== Stage ===
Baxendale starred as Christine in Patrick Marber's After Miss Julie, and in 2005 appeared as Romy, the title role in The Woman Before at the Royal Court alongside Nigel Lindsay, Saskia Reeves, Tom Riley and Georgia Taylor. She played Ophelia in Hamlet (the Marovitz Hamlet) alongside Henry Ian Cusick. She was nominated for an Ian Charleson Award (best classical actor under 30) for her 1993 performance in Soldiers at the Glasgow Citizens Theatre. In 2009, Baxendale played Lara in Amongst Friends alongside Aden Gillett and Emma Cunniffe at Hampstead Theatre.

=== Radio ===
In 2008, Baxendale guest starred in episode three of the award-winning BBC radio comedy Cabin Pressure.

== Personal life ==
Baxendale has been with her boyfriend David L. Williams since her Glasgow days. Together, they have three children. Her first pregnancy was written into An Unsuitable Job for a Woman and her second was written into the fourth series of Cold Feet. Baxendale's oldest child is the actress Nell Williams.

Due to Baxendale's first pregnancy, and that she lived in the UK rather than the US, her character was written out of Friends earlier than the writers had originally intended. She appeared in only 14 episodes, despite her character dating, marrying, and divorcing Ross Geller, one of the show's six leads.

== Filmography ==
=== Film ===
Year	Title	Role	Notes
1993	Euphoric Scale	(unknown)	Short film
1994	Love's Lost Hour	Hilary	Short film
1996	Bolse vita	Maggie	
1997	Macbeth	Lady Macbeth	
1997	I'd Like a Word With You	Joan	Direct-to-video
1998	Angel at My Bedside	Younger Angel	Short film
2000	Ordinary Decent Criminal	Lisa	With Kevin Spacey and Linda Fiorentino
2001	Dead by Monday	Julie Matthews	
2002	Flyfishing	Sam	Also executive producer
2002	Lost in the Snow	Lily (voice)	Animated film (video)
2003	Skagerrak	Stella	
2009	Beyond the Pole	Becky	Also executive producer
2010	Big Mouth	Mum	Short film
2010	The Rendezvous	(voice)	
2011	Anonymous	Anne de Vere	
2017	Heidi: Queen of the Mountain	Seb	

=== Television ===
Year	Title	Role	Notes
1993	The Good Guys	Miss Lomax	Episode: "All for Love"
1993	The Marshal	Anita	Television film
1993	Casualty	Emma Hayes	Episode: "Give Us This Day"
1994–1996	Cardiac Arrest	Dr. Claire Maitland	Series 1–3; 27 episodes — Nominated: BAFTA Scotland Award for Best Actress in Television (1995)
1995	Dangerfield	Tara 'Crystal' Jackson	Episode: "The Call Girl"
1996	In Suspicious Circumstances	Queen Elizabeth I	Episode: "An Evil Business"
1996	Screen One	Lorna Johnston	Episode: "Truth or Dare" — Nominated: BAFTA Scotland Award for Best Actress in Television (1997)
1996	Screen Two	Ruth Clarke	Episode: "Crossing the Floor"
1997	The Investigator	Sgt. Caroline Meagher	Television film
1997–2001	An Unsuitable Job for a Woman	Cordelia Gray	Series 1 & 2; 10 episodes
1997–2003	Cold Feet	Rachel Bradley	Pilot (1997) & Series 1–5; 33 episodes Broadcasting Press Guild Award for Best Actress — Nominated: British Comedy Award for Best TV Comedy Actress (1997)
1998–1999	Friends	Emily Waltham	Recurring role; 14 episodes (Seasons 4 and 5)
2000	Tales from the Madhouse	The Servant Girl	Mini-series; episode: "The Servant Girl"
2001	Adrian Mole: The Cappuccino Years	Pandora Braithwaite	Mini-series; 6 episodes
2003	Murder in Mind	Helen Robbins	Episode: "Justice"
2006	The Only Boy for Me	Annie	Television film
2007	Dead Clever: The Life and Crimes of Julie Bottomley	Sarah	Television film
2008	Agatha Christie's Miss Marple	Mary Dove	Episode: "A Pocket Full of Rye"
2009	Lewis	Caroline	Episode: "Counter Culture Blues"
2010, 2012	Dirk Gently	Susan Harmison	2 episodes
2011–2012	Kidnap and Ransom	Angela Beddoes	Series 1 & 2; 6 episodes
2012	Inspector George Gently	Frances Groves	Episode: "The Lost Child"
2012–2019	Cuckoo	Lorna Thompson	Series 1–5; 33 episodes
2013	Agatha Christie's Poirot	Elizabeth Cole	Episode: "Curtain: Poirot’s Last Case"
2014	Death in Paradise	Sasha Moore	Episode: "Death of a Detective"
2014	Law & Order: UK	Eleanor Richmond	Episode: "Flaw"
2014	The Secrets	Julie	Mini-series; episode: "The Visitor"
2016	Midsomer Murders	Rose Lancaster	Episode: "Habeas Corpus"
2017	Sugar Free Farm	Herself - Narrator	Series 2; 4 episodes
2020	Agatha and the Midnight Murders	Agatha Christie	Television film
2020, 2022	Noughts + Crosses	Meggie McGregor	Series 1 & 2; 7 episodes
2024	Orangutan Jungle School	Herself - Narrator	Series 3; 6 episodes
2026	The Dark	Bethany Morgan	6 episodes
