= Cersei Lannister =

Character in A Song of Ice and Fire

- A Song of Ice and Fire character Game of Thrones character
- Lena Headey as Cersei Lannister in Game of Thrones
- First appearance: Literature: A Game of Thrones (1996); Television: "Winter Is Coming" (2011); Video game: "Iron From Ice" (2014)
- Last appearance: Television: "The Iron Throne" (2019); Video game: Reigns: Game of Thrones (2018)
- Created by: George R. R. Martin
- Based on: Margaret of Anjou; Catherine de' Medici
- Adapted by: D.B. Weiss and David Benioff (Game of Thrones)
- Portrayed by: Lena Headey; Nell Williams (young); Daisy Franks (The Mad King)
- Voiced by: Lena Headey (Game of Thrones); Jess Nahikian (Game of Thrones: Kingsroad)

In-universe information
- Gender: Female
- Titles: Queen Consort (to Robert I); Queen Regent (to Joffrey and Tommen); Lady of Casterly Rock; Light of the West; Dowager Queen; Television: Queen of the Andals and the First Men
- Family: House Lannister (by birth); House Baratheon (by marriage)
- Spouse: Robert Baratheon
- Significant others: Jaime Lannister; Lancel Lannister; Osmund Kettleblack; Osney Kettleblack; Osfryd Kettleblack; Taena Merryweather; Television: Euron Greyjoy
- Children: with Jaime (legally with Robert): Joffrey Baratheon; Myrcella Baratheon; Tommen Baratheon; Television: with Robert: Unnamed infant son; with Jaime: Unborn child
- Relatives: Tywin Lannister (father); Joanna Lannister (mother); Jaime Lannister (twin brother); Tyrion Lannister (brother); Kevan Lannister (uncle); Lancel Lannister (cousin)

Cersei Lannister is a fictional character in the A Song of Ice and Fire series of epic fantasy novels by American author George R. R. Martin, and one of the franchise's main characters. She is portrayed by actress Lena Headey. Introduced in 1996's A Game of Thrones, Cersei is a member of House Lannister, one of the wealthiest and most powerful families on the continent of Westeros. She subsequently appears in A Clash of Kings (1998) and A Storm of Swords (2000), and becomes a prominent point of view character beginning with A Feast for Crows (2005). Cersei will continue to be a point-of-view character in the forthcoming volume The Winds of Winter.

Cersei is Queen of the Seven Kingdoms of Westeros by marriage to King Robert Baratheon, who abuses her throughout their marriage. Her father, Tywin, arranged the marriage after his attempt to betroth her to Prince Rhaegar Targaryen, whom she idolized as a child, failed. Robert took the Throne with the help of the Lannisters when he ended the Targaryen dynasty. Cersei has been involved in an incestuous affair with her twin brother, Jaime, since childhood. All three of Cersei's children are Jaime's, unbeknownst to Robert. The rumored illegitimacy of her children causes a power struggle in the wake of the king's death, known as the War of the Five Kings.

Cersei's main character attributes are her lust for power, scheming, transgressive viewpoint, and her love for her children, whom she seeks to protect. She is considered one of the most complex characters in the story. Headey received widespread critical acclaim for her portrayal of the character on the HBO series Game of Thrones. She was nominated for five Emmy Awards for Outstanding Supporting Actress in a Drama Series and a Golden Globe Award for Best Supporting Actress for her performance. Headey and the rest of the cast were nominated for seven Screen Actors Guild Awards for Outstanding Performance by an Ensemble in a Drama Series. In season 5 of the series, a young version of the character is portrayed by Nell Williams in a flashback.

== Character background ==
=== A Song of Ice and Fire ===
Cersei is the only daughter and the eldest child of 56-year-old Tywin Lannister and his late wife, Joanna; her twin brother, Jaime, was born soon after Cersei. At the beginning of the novels, Cersei is 32 years old and has been queen consort for 14 years.

Cersei and Jaime looked so similar as children that Cersei occasionally wore Jaime's clothes and was mistaken for him. The twins experimented sexually at an early age but were discovered by a servant, who informed their mother. Joanna tasked a guard to keep the twins separated and kept the matter a secret from their father, threatening the twins that she would inform him if they ever repeated it.

Soon afterward, Joanna died giving birth to the twins' younger dwarf brother, Tyrion, when the twins were seven. Cersei blamed Tyrion for Joanna's death and started to abuse him as a baby. Martin said in Rolling Stone:

There's certainly a great level of narcissism in Cersei. She has an almost sociopathic view of the world and civilization.

From the time she was very young, Tywin hoped his daughter would marry Rhaegar Targaryen, and he rejected the Princess of Dorne's proposal to betroth Oberyn Martell and Elia Martell to Cersei and Jaime, respectively. Cersei became infatuated with Rhaegar; feelings she hid from her brother as her father advised her.

At the age of 11, Jaime was sent away to serve as a squire for Lord Sumner Crakehall. A year later, Aerys Targaryen rejected the proposal that Cersei marry his son, humiliating Tywin. Tywin took Cersei to King's Landing and, in the following years, refused every offer of marriage for her. In 281 AC, when Cersei and Jaime were 15, Jaime, newly knighted on the battlefield and on his way to Casterly Rock, came to King's Landing to visit his sister, from whom he had been separated for four years. She informed Jaime that their father planned to marry him to Lysa Tully and persuaded him to join the Kingsguard in order to be near her, after the twins had slept together for the first time. Thus started an affair that continued throughout Cersei's marriage to Robert Baratheon.

While she was initially happy about marrying Robert, he didn't return Cersei's affections and repeatedly cheated on her. She continued her incestuous affair with Jaime, resulting in the births of Joffrey, Myrcella, and Tommen.

During her teenage years, believing that her betrothal to Rhaegar would soon be announced, Cersei brought her companions Melara Hetherspoon and Jeyne Farman to a witch named Maggy the Frog. Jeyne was instantly frightened and left the tent. Cersei and Melara stayed and tried to get the witch to tell them a prophecy. In the face of Cersei's threats, Maggy agreed to answer three questions. In response to those questions, Maggy told Cersei she would marry the king and not the prince, that she would be overthrown by a younger and more beautiful queen, that Cersei's children would die during Cersei's lifetime, and that the valonqar (High Valyrian for "little brother") would come to end her life.

Melara then asked if she would marry Jaime; Maggy answered that Melara wouldn't marry anyone and would die that night. It is implied that Cersei killed the girl to prevent her from speaking of the prophecies and for having ideas above her social status. Cersei spends her entire adult life attempting to subvert the prophecy and develops a strong paranoia, which eventually causes the prophecy to come to fruition.

=== TV adaptation ===
Cersei is the only daughter and the eldest child of Tywin Lannister (portrayed by Charles Dance) and his wife, Joanna; her twin brother, Jaime, was born soon after Cersei. At the beginning of the series, Cersei is 37 years old and has been queen for 17 years (as opposed to 14 in the novels).

She is five years older than her book counterpart, and only four years older than Tyrion Lannister in the television series (portrayed by actor Peter Dinklage). Like her book counterpart, she blames him for the death of her mother in childbirth when she was 4 years old (as opposed to 7 in the novels).

Similar to her book counterpart, she received a prophecy from Maggy the Frog (Jodhi May) warning of her impending doom to a younger, more beautiful queen, and also forewarning the death of three of her children, though there is no prophecy of the Valonqar choking her to death. Additionally, Cersei had a firstborn, black-haired son born to Robert Baratheon (portrayed by Mark Addy) who died as an infant. She confides in Catelyn Stark (Michelle Fairley) about this after the potential loss of her ten-year-old son, Bran Stark (Isaac Hempstead-Wright) and later Robert himself.

== Storylines ==
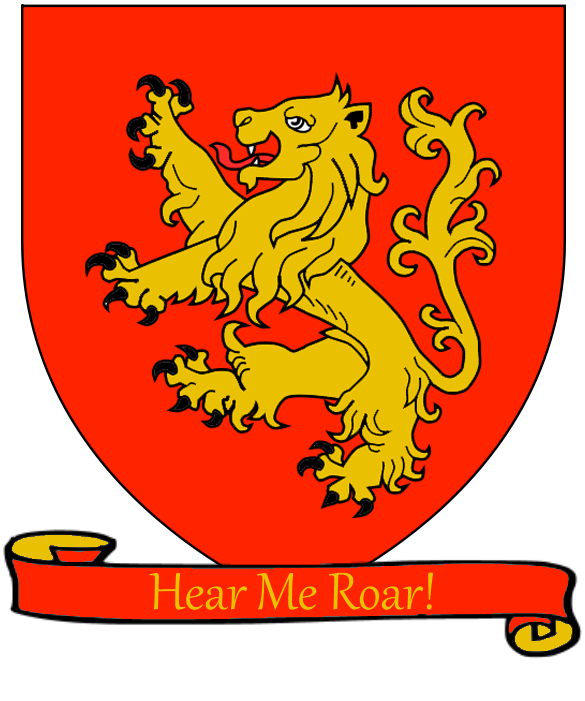
Coat of arms of House Lannister

=== A Game of Thrones ===
Robert, Cersei, and most of the court visit the North to appoint Eddard Stark (Ned) as Hand of the King. During the royal visit to Winterfell, Ned's son Bran finds Cersei and Jaime committing incest in a tower. To prevent their adultery and incest from being revealed, Jaime pushes Bran from the tower. Bran survives, but has no memory of the fall and is left paraplegic.

Ned eventually discovers the truth of Cersei's infidelity and confronts her, giving her the opportunity to flee into exile and thus spare her children certain execution. Cersei had already arranged Robert's death in a hunting "accident"; when he dies, Cersei seizes control as regent and has Eddard arrested for treason. Cersei intends for Ned to publicly confess and join the Night's Watch as punishment, but instead Joffrey orders him executed.

=== A Clash of Kings ===
Frustrated with Cersei's many political blunders as well as her failure to control Joffrey, Tywin appoints Tyrion Hand of the King, with explicit instructions to control Cersei and Joffrey. Once at the capital, Tyrion enters into a bitter power struggle with Cersei, subverting her authority and removing her supporters from positions of power.

In Jaime's absence, Cersei takes their cousin Lancel Lannister as her lover, an affair that Tyrion discovers. When Stannis Baratheon sails on King's Landing, Cersei and Joffrey stay enclosed in the Red Keep, leaving Tyrion to mastermind the defense of the city. Ultimately, Tywin and the Tyrell armies arrive in time to force Stannis to retreat and save the city.

=== A Storm of Swords ===
After formally assuming his position as Hand of the King, Tywin makes it clear to Cersei that she is no longer welcome at the small council meetings, de facto stripping her of political authority. Furthermore, Tywin intends to wed Cersei to Loras Tyrell in order to form an alliance with House Tyrell. This state of affairs is shaken when Joffrey is poisoned at his wedding feast. Maddened with grief at the loss of her eldest child, Cersei lashes out against Tyrion, accusing him of poisoning the king out of revenge.

Cersei manipulates Tyrion's trial to ensure a guilty verdict, by bribing and intimidating witnesses. When Tyrion demands a trial by combat, Cersei selects the imposing Gregor Clegane, "The Mountain," as the Crown's champion. The Mountain prevails, killing Tyrion's champion Oberyn Martell. Tywin then pronounces Tyrion guilty and sentences him to death, but Tyrion escapes prison and kills Tywin. Cersei is once again in complete control of the capital.

=== A Feast for Crows ===
With the deaths of her father and eldest son, Cersei's youngest child, the 8-year-old Tommen Baratheon, is crowned king, and Cersei rules the Seven Kingdoms as Queen Regent. Cersei's rule descends into a series of political and economic blunders due to her short temper, egotism, and paranoia, greatly damaging her relationship with Jaime and alienating allies such as Pycelle and Kevan Lannister. She defaults on debts to the Iron Bank of Braavos and to the Faith, allowing the latter to rebuild its military orders in exchange for cancellation of the debt, and fills government posts with ineffective and untrustworthy cronies and sycophants. At the same time, the Tyrells begin to build power in the capital, much to Cersei's consternation.

Cersei is haunted by the prophecy of the valonqar, whom she considers Tyrion, so she promises a lordship to whoever brings her Tyrion's head. This, however, only leads to many wrongful executions throughout the realm. In an attempt to undermine the Tyrells, and release her son from his marriage to Margaery Tyrell, Cersei attempts to frame Margaery for adultery and treason. However, this plot backfires as the investigation into Margaery reveals evidence of Cersei's own adultery and her complicity in Robert's death, resulting in her arrest by the Faith. Cersei sends a letter to Jaime, asking him for help, but he ignores her request and burns her letter.

=== A Dance with Dragons ===
To gain release from her imprisonment, Cersei confesses to several of the lesser charges against her, including post-marital affairs, but does not confess to having murdered her husband King Robert, nor that her children are the product of incest. Cersei is nevertheless punished with a walk of atonement, forcing her to strip and walk naked through the capital in full view of the public.

With Cersei confined to the Red Keep awaiting trial, the realm is governed by Pycelle and Kevan. However, at the nadir of Cersei's fortunes, Varys reappears at the capital and assassinates both Pycelle and Kevan, as their competent leadership threatened to undo the damage Cersei's misrule had done.

=== Family tree of House Lannister ===
Descendants of Tytos Lannister

Tytos	Jeyne; Marbrand
Joanna	Tywin	Emmon; Frey	Genna	Kevan	Dorna; Swyft	Tygett	Darlessa; Marbrand	Gerion	Briony
Robert; Baratheon	Cersei	Jaime	Tysha (Note: Tyrion's first wife was a peasant girl named Tysha. The marriage was later annulled by Lord Tywin's order.)	Tyrion	Sansa; Stark	Amerei; Frey	Lancel	Martyn	Willem	Janei	Tyrek	Ermesande; Hayford	Joy; Hill
Joffrey; Baratheon (Note: Though officially Robert's children, Joffrey, Myrcella and Tommen are the products of an incestuous affair between Cersei and Jaime.)	Myrcella; Baratheon	Margaery; Tyrell	Tommen; Baratheon	Tion; Frey	"Red" Walder; Frey	Jeyne; Darry	Cleos; Frey	Lyonel; Frey	Melesa Crakehall
Tywin; Frey	Willem; Frey

References and notes:

== TV adaptation ==
Cersei Lannister is played by Lena Headey in the television adaption of the book series. Prior to Headey's casting, Tricia Helfer auditioned for the role.

In October 2014, Headey and several other key cast members, all contracted for six seasons of the series, renegotiated their deals to include a potential seventh season and salary increases for seasons 5, 6, and 7. The Hollywood Reporter called the raises "huge", noting that the deal would make the performers "among the highest-paid actors on cable TV". Deadline Hollywood put the number for season 5 at "close to $300,000 an episode" for each actor, and The Hollywood Reporter wrote in June 2016 that the performers would each be paid "upward of $500,000 per episode" for season 7 and the potential season 8. In 2017, Headey became one of the highest paid actors on television and will earn £2 million per episode for the show.

=== Storylines ===
Much of Cersei's storyline from the first and second seasons in the television series is unchanged from the books. However, a notable change in the show is Joffrey's authorising the purge of Robert's bastards, rather than Cersei.

==== Season 1 ====
Cersei learns that her husband Robert is in danger of finding out that the children he sees as his heirs to the throne are not his. Robert meets his end as the result of a boar attack on a hunting trip, before Ned Stark tells him the truth about his children. Cersei works quickly to instate her oldest son, Joffrey, on the throne, with her as his chief political advisor and Queen Regent. Joffrey, however, quickly shows signs of independence.

==== Season 2 ====
Tywin decides that Cersei does not exercise enough control over her son and sends Tyrion as an additional political advisor. Cersei and Tyrion do not get along, and constantly try to undermine each other's authority over the crown. As of the end of season 2, Tyrion has accumulated more sway over the Iron Throne, has shipped Cersei's only daughter off against Cersei's will to be married to the Prince of Dorne, and is forcing their cousin Lancel, with whom Cersei is having an affair, to inform on her. Tywin's arrival with the Tyrell army robs both siblings of their influence at the last possible moment.

==== Season 3 ====
Cersei comes to fear that Margaery Tyrell intends to usurp her as queen and unsuccessfully tries to alienate Joffrey from her. When Tywin learns of the Tyrells' plan to wed Sansa Stark to Margaery's brother Loras, he intervenes by having Tyrion marry Sansa instead. Cersei is delighted but her joy turns to anger when Tywin also orders her to marry Loras. When Jaime returns to King's Landing, he immediately seeks out Cersei, who is shocked to discover that his sword hand has been cut off.

==== Season 4 ====
Cersei has Tyrion arrested after Joffrey is fatally poisoned. Mourning and vindictive, it's implied that guilty or innocent, she wants Tyrion dead, while Jaime refuses to believe Tyrion is capable of familial regicide. Indeed, at Tyrion's trial, it is apparent Cersei has manipulated the proceedings so that the witnesses give either incomplete or entirely false testimonies to implicate Tyrion and Sansa further in the murder. When Tyrion demands a trial by combat, Cersei chooses Ser Gregor "The Mountain" Clegane as royal champion, to further diminish Tyrion's chances, and bribes Bronn via betrothal to a noblewoman, to secure his veto as Tyrion's champion. Cersei's wish comes true when Tyrion's champion, Oberyn Martell, is killed by Clegane. She still refuses to marry Loras, threatening even to reveal the truth of her incestuous relationship with Jaime and their three blond children. Tywin is killed by an escaping Tyrion soon afterward.

==== Season 5 ====
Cersei receives a threat from Dorne, where Myrcella is betrothed to Trystane Martell, and sends Jaime to Dorne to retrieve her. Tommen is married to Margaery, who tries to manipulate Tommen into sending Cersei to Casterly Rock. Fearful of losing her power, Cersei meets the religious leader, the High Sparrow, appoints him as the High Septon, and gives him authority to re-establish the Faith Militant. In order to destabilise House Tyrell, Cersei arranges for the High Sparrow to arrest Loras for his homosexuality, and have Margaery also arrested for perjury after lying to defend Loras. However, Cersei's plot backfires when Lancel, now a member of the Faith Militant, confesses to his affair with Cersei and his role in Robert's assassination, and accuses Cersei of incest, prompting the High Sparrow to arrest her. Cersei is eventually allowed to return to the Red Keep after confessing to having committed adultery with Lancel, but has her hair cut off and is forced to walk naked through the streets of King's Landing as atonement. Cersei returns, distraught from the abuse directed at her by the smallfolk of King's Landing, but is consoled by Qyburn's successful reanimation of Ser Gregor Clegane.

==== Season 6 ====
Cersei remains in the Red Keep, confined to her chambers and stripped of her authority. Although she accepts Tommen's apology for his lack of action in her arrest and walk of atonement, she remains looked down upon by other members of the court. Cersei learns from Tommen that the High Sparrow plans to have Margaery do a walk of atonement before Cersei's trial and conspires with the Small Council to have the Tyrell army march on the Sept of Baelor to secure Margaery's and Loras' release. Their plan backfires when it is revealed that Margaery has joined the Faith of the Seven and has convinced Tommen to merge the Faith and the Crown. Despite being stripped of her allies, Cersei opts to remain in King's Landing, having named Ser Gregor as her champion in her trial by combat. However, Tommen announces that trial by combat has been abolished and replaced by trial by the Seven. Cersei arranges for a cache of wildfire to be detonated beneath the Sept during Loras' trial, which kills the High Sparrow, Margaery, Loras, and the rest of the Small Council. As a result of Cersei's actions, Tommen commits suicide. In the power vacuum following Tommen's death, Cersei claims the Iron Throne as the first queen regnant of the Seven Kingdoms.

==== Season 7 ====
Despite nominally being ruler of Westeros, Cersei's grip on the throne is tenuous, with the Riverlands in upheaval following Arya Stark's massacre of House Frey, the Vale and the North's declaration of Ned Stark's bastard son Jon Snow King in the North, and Tyrion, Yara Greyjoy, Dorne, and the Reach all supporting Daenerys Targaryen, whose fleet has seized Dragonstone. Cersei remains cold and distant after Tommen's suicide, viewing it as a betrayal of their family. With no children left to protect, Cersei's malice and vindictiveness have grown, and she relentlessly seeks to expand her power and destroy her enemies. Cersei reaches out to the King of the Iron Islands, Euron Greyjoy, to form an alliance, but rejects Euron's marriage proposal as she considers him untrustworthy. Euron later ambushes Daenerys' fleet and captures Yara Greyjoy, Ellaria, and Tyene Sand, and presents them as a "gift" to Cersei. She agrees to marry Euron after the war is won; however, she continues her affair with Jaime, no longer attempting to hide their relationship from their servants. Cersei imprisons Ellaria and Tyene in the dungeons, kills Tyene with the same poison used to kill Myrcella, and keeps Ellaria alive to watch her daughter die and decompose.

Tycho Nestoris of the Iron Bank arrives in King's Landing to request repayment of their debt. Cersei requests a fortnight in order to comply. She then has the Lannister and Tarly armies attack Highgarden, defeating the Tyrells. Olenna Tyrell dies after drinking poison given to her by Jaime following the defeat and gloats to him that she was responsible for poisoning Joffrey. The Tyrells' wealth is transported safely to King's Landing, but the food the Lannisters steal from the Reach is destroyed when Daenerys attacks the caravan with her Dothraki horde and dragon, Drogon. Jaime barely survives the battle and encourages Cersei to consider a ceasefire.

Tyrion infiltrates the capital to meet with Jaime, and Jaime tells Cersei that Daenerys and Jon want to meet with Cersei to negotiate an armistice while mankind fights the threat of the White Walkers. Cersei is skeptical but agrees, and tells Jaime that she is pregnant. Daenerys and Jon meet with Cersei in the Dragonpit on the outskirts of King's Landing, and present to her a wight captured from the White Walkers as evidence of their threat. Although terrified, Cersei initially refuses to agree to an armistice, as Jon refuses to remain neutral in the war between the Lannisters and Targaryens. Tyrion speaks to Cersei in private, and apparently persuades her to ally with the rival monarchs. However, she later reveals to Jaime that she intends for her enemies to wipe each other out and then attack the victor, and has sent Euron to Essos to transport the Golden Company to Westeros. Disgusted by Cersei's selfishness and shortsightedness, Jaime finally abandons her side and goes north on his own, leaving Cersei alone.

==== Season 8 ====
Cersei is informed that the White Walkers have breached the Wall, to her delight. Euron Greyjoy returns to King's Landing with the Golden Company, and Cersei finally has sex with him. Cersei tasks Qyburn with hiring Bronn to kill Jaime and Tyrion, using the crossbow with which Tyrion had killed Tywin.

Cersei permits civilians to seek refuge in the Red Keep – ostensibly to protect them from an invasion of King's Landing, but in reality she plans to use them as human shields to deter an attack. The Iron Fleet kills one of Daenerys' dragons, Rhaegal, and takes her advisor Missandei captive. When Euron returns to King's Landing, Cersei reveals that she is pregnant and lies that it is his. Daenerys, Tyrion, and her other advisors travel to King's Landing demanding Cersei's surrender, but Cersei is unmoved and has the Mountain behead Missandei in front of Daenerys. Daenerys subsequently launches an attack on the Iron Fleet, and the anti-dragon defenses Cersei has had installed on King's Landing's walls, prompting the city's surrender. However, she then continues to burn the rest of the city, deliberately attacking innocent civilians, and then attacks the Red Keep itself. Cersei attempts to take shelter and is found by Jaime, who had infiltrated the Red Keep on Tyrion's orders to evacuate her. However, their passage is blocked by rubble. The Red Keep begins to collapse, and Jaime comforts Cersei in their final moments as they are crushed by falling debris. Their bodies are later found by Tyrion, whose subsequent grief leads him to renounce his loyalty to Daenerys and persuade Jon Snow to kill her.

== Reception and awards ==
=== Television ===
Cersei has been praised as one of the most complex and multi-faceted characters in either version of the story. Rolling Stone ranked her at No. 5 on a list of the "Top 40 Game of Thrones Characters", describing Cersei as a woman and matriarch who "battles for a place at the table in a world made for men" and would do anything to protect her offspring. As a player of the game, Cersei "would rather die than give you control". In Rolling Stone's list of the "30 Best Game of Thrones Villains", Cersei was ranked No. 1. Described as the "most dangerous human being in Westeros" and "one of the most complex and fascinating characters on television", Cersei is also a "strangely sympathetic figure, warped by being treated like an expensive brood mare by powerful men her entire life and genuine in her affections", while her bitter experience makes her her own worst enemy and "the villain of her own story".

Lena Headey received much critical praise for her portrayal of Cersei. James Hibberd of Entertainment Weekly stated that from the first season, Headey "perfectly delivered Cersei’s uniquely toxic mix of pride, vindictiveness, impatience, cunning, and spite" and Cersei "has never been anything less than a fully realized character." The New York Times's Jeremy Egner remarked that Headey "has always been one of the strongest performers on the show." In The New Yorker, Clive James wrote that she is a "beautiful expression of arbitrary terror, combining shapely grace with limitless evil in just the right measure to scare a man to death while rendering him helpless with desire", praising the depth to which Headey "beams Cersei's radiant malevolence" into the viewer's mind "that she reawakens a formative disturbance”. Andrew Anthony in The Guardian opined that the series was "most often at its best when Headey was on screen and radiating cold calculation and ruthless intrigue." He described Headey's Cersei as "a study in tyranny as a seductive art. There was something magnetically human about her inhumanity. You were drawn to her devious charms even as you recoiled from her brutal deeds." George R. R. Martin, author of the novels, praised Headey in the role, remarking that Cersei is “a character with many colors” and Headey’s range is instrumental. Martin regarded Headey as a “very sympathetic actress ... a different actress wouldn’t be able to sell it”, and called her portrayal of Cersei “marvelous”.

Headey received an EWwy Award for Best Supporting Actress in a Drama in 2012, a Portal Award for Best Actress in 2012, and the Women's Image Award for Actress Drama Series in 2014. She received five nominations for the Primetime Emmy Award for Outstanding Supporting Actress in a Drama Series in 2014, 2015, 2016, 2018 and 2019. She was also nominated for the Golden Globe Award for Best Supporting Actress in a Series, Miniseries, or Television Film in 2016, the Critics' Choice Television Award for Best Supporting Actress in a Drama Series in 2016, the Satellite Award for Best Supporting Actress in a Series, Miniseries or Television Film in 2017, the Golden Nymph Award for Outstanding Actress in a Drama Series in 2012, and the Saturn Award for Best Actress on Television in 2012 and 2017 and Best Supporting Actress on Television in 2016.

== In popular culture ==
In April 2019, Lena Headey and Peter Dinklage appeared as Cersei and Tyrion Lannister alongside Elmo in a Sesame Street PSA on the importance of being respectful to one another, as part of Sesame Street's "Respect Brings Us Together" campaign. In August 2019, Headey's and Coster-Waldau's likenesses as Cersei and Jaime were used to represent the influencer "Storm Twins" in the Marvel Comics series Spider-Gwen, a duo of similarly incestuous influencer twins who seek to drive Gwen Stacy off of Earth-65 after the twins had seduced, murdered, and replaced their reality's benevolent Doctor Doom.
