= The Joneses =

2009 American film directed by Derrick Borte

- Theatrical release poster
- Directed by: Derrick Borte
- Written by: Derrick Borte
- Produced by: Derrick Borte; Doug Mankoff; Andrew Spaulding; Kristi Zea
- Starring: Demi Moore; David Duchovny; Amber Heard; Ben Hollingsworth; Gary Cole; Lauren Hutton
- Cinematography: Yaron Orbach
- Edited by: Janice Hampton
- Music by: Nick Urata
- Production companies: Premiere Picture; Echo Lake Productions
- Distributed by: Roadside Attractions
- Release dates: September 13, 2009 (TIFF); April 16, 2010 (United States)
- Running time: 96 minutes
- Country: United States
- Language: English
- Budget: $10 million
- Box office: $7 million

The Joneses is a 2009 American comedy-drama film written and directed by Derrick Borte, in his directorial debut. It stars Demi Moore, David Duchovny, Amber Heard, and Ben Hollingsworth. It premiered at the 2009 Toronto International Film Festival on September 13, 2009. Roadside Attractions later purchased the United States theatrical distribution rights. It had a limited release on April 16, 2010 and was released on DVD & Blu-ray On August 10, 2010.

== Plot ==
Kate, Steve, Mick, and Jenn Jones move into an upscale suburb under the guise of being a typical family relocating because of the changing nature of Kate's and Steve's careers. In reality, Kate is the leader of a team of stealth marketers, professional salespeople who disguise product placement as a daily routine.

Their clothing, accessories, furniture, and even food are planned and stocked by various companies to create visibility in a consumer market. While Kate's team is highly effective, Steve is new to the team, Jenn is a closet nymphomaniac with a penchant for hitting on her fake fathers, and a 30-day review is fast approaching.

The team quickly ingrains itself into the community, slowly shifting from displaying products to recommending them. Soon, local stores and businesses are stocking products based on the Joneses' trend-setting styles.

However, at the end of the 30-day review, Steve discovers that he has the lowest sales numbers of the team and Kate's job is endangered unless he can get his numbers up before the next review in 60 days.

Eventually, Steve begins to find a sales tactic that works by playing on the fears of his neighbors and sympathizing with their dull, repetitive, unfulfilled careers. As someone frustrated with his job and disconnected from his fake "family", he turns to their products to keep himself entertained.

When Steve recognizes this same pattern in their neighbors, his sales begin to steadily increase. He starts pitching products as the solution for suburban boredom and generating product "buzz" through unwitting ropers.

The team's dynamics become more complicated when Kate applies herself to the technique as well. Realizing that they can boost sales by perfecting their fake family dynamic to sell the image of a lifestyle, the lines between acting and reality start to break down.

Things also get more complicated when Mick finds himself growing closer to an unpopular girl at the high school, Naomi, in whom he can confide. Jenn's flirtation with Alex Bayner, one of the men in the neighborhood, raises the suspicions of the neighbors.

The team's cover is almost blown several times. Once when an old acquaintance of Steve's recognizes him at a restaurant, again when Jenn's indiscretions nearly expose her real age, and after a party where Mick markets alcohol to minors.

Eventually, each member of the team finds that the constant pretense slowly erodes their desires. Jenn's dreams of running away with a rich, older man come to a close when she realizes that she is being used by Alex. Mick has a crisis of conscience when Naomi gets into a car accident after drinking too much of a wine cooler they were marketing to teens. Worse, when he makes a pass at Naomi's brother, he gets a black eye in return.

After amassing nearly record-breaking numbers, Steve is offered the chance to join an "icon" unit alone. He refuses, knowing that this is Kate's dream and because he believes that the "family" can do it together.

When Steve's closest friend in the community, Larry, reveals that he's going to lose his house because he's overextended his credit, Steve tries again to see if Kate wants something more than a pretend marriage and Kate agrees to go Arizona with him during their vacation. The next day Steve discovers to his horror that Larry has committed suicide over the debts.

Grief-stricken, Steve confesses to the community about the real nature of his job. With their covers blown, the rest of the Joneses leave quickly and are reassigned to a new home.

Steve refuses the offer to join an icon cell and tracks the family down to their new location. There, he reunites with Kate and tries one last time to convince her to leave. Initially, she rebuffs him, and Steve leaves. As he is walking away down the darkened street, Kate pulls up in her car and stops and Steve gets in. When Steve asks "Where to?" Kate says "Arizona".

== Cast ==
- David Duchovny as Steve Jones/Steve Cerilla
- Demi Moore as Kate Jones
- Amber Heard as Jenn Jones
- Ben Hollingsworth as Mick Jones
- Gary Cole as Larry Symonds
- Glenne Headly as Summer Symonds
- Lauren Hutton as KC (the Joneses' boss)
- Chris Williams as Billy (salon owner)
- Christine Evangelista as Naomi Madsen
- Jayson Warner Smith as Maitre d'
- Robert Pralgo as Alex Bayner
- Tiffany Morgan as Melanie Bayner
- Wilbur Fitzgerald as Golfer

== Production ==
Production began in October 2008, in Alpharetta, Georgia.

In September 2009, FilmNation Entertainment joined as co-producer with them acquiring international sales to the film.

Duchovny stated that he and Moore each had a mansion to themselves during filming. "It was a planned neighbourhood of McMansions, built during the boom times and nowadays it's about half-filled. So we just moved into a few of these amazingly huge houses," said Duchovny.

== Reception ==
On Rotten Tomatoes the film has an approval rating of 62% based on 131 reviews, with an average rating of 6.2/10. The critical consensus states: "It doesn't pursue its subversive premise as far as it should, but The Joneses benefits from its timely satire of consumer culture – as well as a pair of strong performances from David Duchovny and Demi Moore." On Metacritic the film has a score of 55% based on reviews from 30 critics, indicating "mixed or average reviews".

== See also ==
- Keeping up with the Joneses
