= American Dreamer (2018 film) =

2018 film by Derrick Borte

- Theatrical release poster
- Directed by: Derrick Borte
- Written by: Derrick Borte; Daniel Forte
- Produced by: Scott Floyd Lochmus
- Starring: Jim Gaffigan; Robbie Jones; Isabel Arraiza; Tammy Blanchard; Alejandro Hernandez; Brian K. Landis
- Cinematography: Eric Hurt
- Edited by: Soojin Chung
- Music by: Bryan Senti
- Production companies: Storyland Pictures; XYZ Films; Sugar Pictures LA
- Distributed by: Saban Films
- Release dates: September 27, 2018 (LA Film Festival); September 20, 2019 (United States)
- Running time: 92 minutes
- Country: United States
- Language: English

American Dreamer is a 2018 American neo-noir thriller film directed by Derrick Borte and written by Derrick Borte and Daniel Forte. The film stars Jim Gaffigan, Robbie Jones, Isabel Arraiza, Tammy Blanchard, Alejandro Hernandez and Brian K. Landis. The film was released on September 20, 2019, by Saban Films.

== Plot ==
Cam (Jim Gaffigan) is an employee for a vehicle for hire company who struggles to make ends meet. Particularly, Cam is having difficulty making child support payments, which could mean losing the ability to see his son. Cam gets the opportunity to chauffeur a low-level drug dealer named Mazz (Robbie Jones) for extra money. However, his increasing financial problems force him to make a rash and desperate decision: kidnap Mazz's infant child and demand a ransom. Cam quickly realizes that he is in way over his head, but there's no turning back.

== Cast ==
- Jim Gaffigan as Cam
- Robbie Jones as Mazz
- Isabel Arraiza as Marina
- Tammy Blanchard as Becca
- Alejandro Hernandez as Gumby
- Brian K. Landis as Greg
- Curtis Lyons as Andre
- Eric D. Hill Jr. as Dontrell
- Harrison Fall as Adam
- Cynthia Tademy as Grandmother
- Michael Hughes as Steve
- Tommy Coleman as Officer Watson

== Release ==
The film premiered at the LA Film Festival on September 27, 2018. The film was released on September 20, 2019, by Saban Films.

== Reception ==
On the review aggregator website Rotten Tomatoes, 57% of 14 critics' reviews are positive, with an average rating of 6/10. Metacritic, which uses a weighted average, assigned the film a score of 40 out of 100, based on 5 critics, indicating "mixed or average" reviews.

Richard Roeper of the Chicago Sun-Times gave the film three and a half out of four stars and wrote, "Directed with claustrophobic, docudrama-style intensity by Derrick Borte (who also co-wrote the screenplay with Daniel Forte) and featuring a career-best dramatic performance by Gaffigan, American Dreamer is a dark and intense and sometimes brutally violent slice of rotted life."

Sheri Linden of The Hollywood Reporter wrote, "Borte has shown a preference for happy endings in his previous work, but here he embraces the story’s dark implications, and the results, however discomforting, are dramatically satisfying."
