= Beyond the Pole =

- Directed by: David L. Williams
- Written by: Neil Warhurst; David L. Williams
- Produced by: David L. Williams; Andrew Curtis; Helen Baxendale
- Starring: Rhys Thomas; Stephen Mangan; Mark Benton; Rosie Cavaliero; Alexander Skarsgård
- Cinematography: Stuart Biddlecombe
- Edited by: Robert Miller
- Music by: Guy Michelmore
- Release dates: 14 October 2009 (Warsaw Film Festival); 12 February 2010
- Running time: 87 minutes
- Country: United Kingdom
- Language: English

Beyond the Pole is a 2009 British mockumentary adapted from the cult BBC radio series of the same name. It received its UK cinema release in 2010. Directed and produced by David L. Williams Beyond the Pole was shot on floating sea ice off the coast of Greenland, and stars an actors and comedians including: Stephen Mangan, Rhys Thomas, Mark Benton, Alexander Skarsgård and Helen Baxendale. Described by Variety magazine as a cross between The Office and Touching the Void, the film follows the trials and tribulations of the world's first Carbon Neutral, Vegetarian, Organic expedition to the North Pole.

== Plot ==
Uptight Mark (Mangan) and his good natured friend and follower Brian (Thomas) hope to save the planet from global warming (and maybe get into the Guinness Book of Records) by setting out on the world's first carbon neutral, vegetarian, organic expedition to the North Pole. Unfortunately they have no experience whatsoever and after shooting their cameraman over a misunderstanding, soon find themselves in a life and death race against a confident gay Olympic Norwegian team led by Alexander Skarsgård. Providing logistical support from the United Kingdom are Brian's wife, Sandra, and Mark's friend, Graham, a keen CB radio enthusiast. The documentary director (Helen Baxendale) does her best to make sure no one actually dies during the making of the documentary, but is out of her depth.

== Cast ==
- Stephen Mangan
- Rhys Thomas
- Alexander Skarsgård
- Helen Baxendale
- Lars Arentz-Hansen
- Mark Benton
- Rosie Cavaliero
- Zoe Telford
- Clive Russell

== Critical reception ==
Premiering in the Best of British strand at the Glasgow International Film Festival, Beyond the Pole went on to win numerous awards on the festival circuit in Europe and the US before its acclaimed UK cinema run. The UK TV premiere in July 2010 was Pick of the Day in The Times and The Guardian.

== Home media ==
The DVD was released on 5 July 2010. Currently the movie is only available in Region 2 format. Featured extras include on set improvisation, television interviews with cast, an onset diary, director Q+A in Los Angeles and a short film from the Friends of the Earth director, Andy Atkins.
