= Robbie Jones (actor) =

American actor

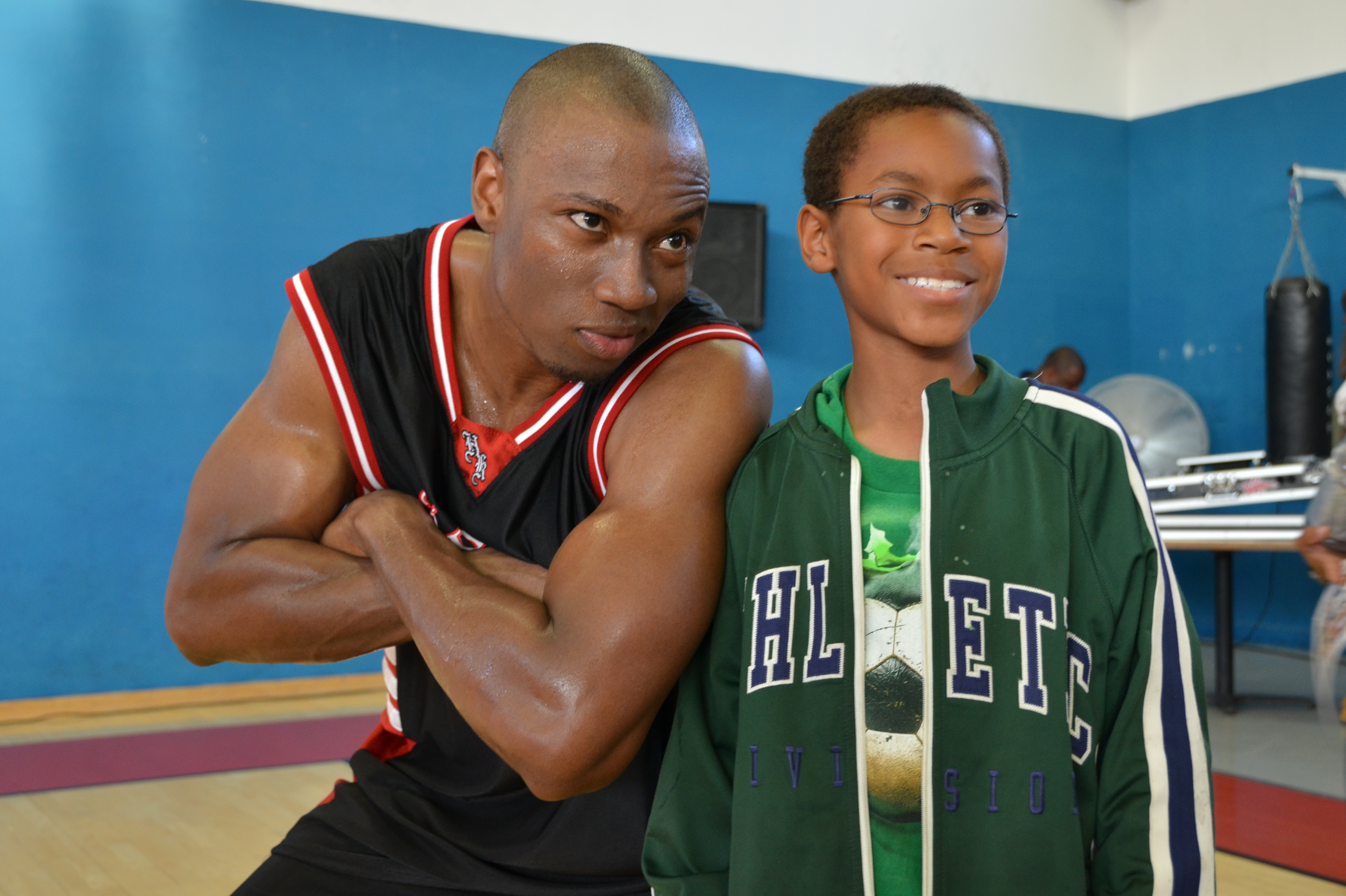
- Jones (left) in 2011
- Born: Robert Lee Jones III; September 25, 1977 (age 48); Oxnard, California, U.S.
- Occupation: Actor
- Years active: 2007–present
- Spouse: Sandi Tucker (m. 2016)
- Children: 2

Robert Lee Jones III (born September 25, 1977) is an American actor. He is best known for his role as Quentin Fields in One Tree Hill. In 2009, Jones starred in the film Hurricane Season with Forest Whitaker. In 2010, he starred in the series Hellcats. He appeared in Temptation: Confessions of a Marriage Counselor alongside Jurnee Smollett-Bell and Lance Gross.

Jones attended the University of California, Berkeley and played on the California Golden Bears men's basketball team from 1996 to 2000. He also played professionally in the American Basketball Association for two seasons and overseas in international leagues for five seasons.

== Filmography ==
Year	Film/TV Show	Character	Notes
2008	One Tree Hill	Quentin Fields	TV series (18 episodes)
2009	Limelight	Xavier Davis	TV series
2009	ER	Jermaine Bennett	TV series (1 episode)
2009	Raising the Bar	Jawara Obasi	TV series (1 episode)
2009	Hurricane Season	Brian Randolph	
2010	Southland	Tyler Prescott	TV series (1 episode)
2010	Dark Blue	Terry 'Teke' Kearn	TV series (1 episode)
2010–2011	Hellcats	Lewis Flynn	TV series
2011	The Ex List	Garvy	TV series (1 episode)
2011	Good Luck Charlie	Doctor in the hospital where Amy works	TV series (1 episode)
2013	Temptation: Confessions of a Marriage Counselor	Harley	
2013	90210	Jordan	6 episodes
2013	Necessary Roughness	Joe "Toes" Kittridge	TV series
2013	Hawaii Five-0	Josh Lowry	Episode: "Hana I Wa 'Ia"
2015–2016	Bosch	George Irving	TV series
2018	American Dreamer	Mazz	
2019	The Fix	Det. Vincent North	TV series
2019	Shaft	Sergeant Keith Williams	
2019	Titans	Faddei	TV series (3 episodes)
2020	Fantasy Island	Allen	
