= Daniel Huttlestone =

English actor

- Born: Daniel Richard Huttlestone; 17 September 1999 (age 26); Havering, Greater London, England
- Occupation(s): Actor, singer
- Years active: 2012–2016
- Known for: Gavroche in Les Misérables (2012).

Daniel Richard Huttlestone (born 17 September 1999) is a British actor and singer. He is best known for his role as Gavroche in Tom Hooper's Les Misérables (2012) and Jack in the musical film Into the Woods (2014), which both earned him a 2013 and 2015 Young Artist Award nomination as Best Young Supporting Actor in a Feature Film.

== Early life ==
Daniel Richard Huttlestone was born on 17 September 1999 in Havering, Greater London, England, the second of three children of Linda, a homemaker, and Mark Huttlestone, a company managing director. He has an elder brother, Thomas Andrew (b. 1997), who is also an actor and has appeared as Friedrich Von Trapp in The Sound of Music UK Tour 2011. His younger sister, Sarah Rosina Huttlestone (b. 2005), is an actress who appeared in Regent's Open Air Theatre production of The Sound of Music, with his former Les Misérables co-star Isabelle Allen.

== Career ==
Huttlestone started his stage career from the age of 9, landing the role of "Nipper" in the 2009 production of Oliver! at the Theatre Royal Drury Lane, performing on the opening night with Rowan Atkinson, and continuing until it closed in 2011. He went on to perform the role of Gavroche, in Les Misérables, at the Queen's Theatre, working with Alfie Boe, Matt Lucas where he stayed with the show for 1 year. He reprised his role from the stage musical as Gavroche for the film adaptation of Les Misérables and also played the role of Jack in the 2014 film version of Into the Woods.

He filmed London Town in the summer of 2015, where he worked with Jonathan Rhys Meyers. Huddlestone played Brian Fawcett in The Lost City of Z. The film premiered at the New York Film Festival on 15 October 2016.

== Filmography ==
| Year | Title | Role | Notes |
|---|---|---|---|
| 2012 | Les Misérables | Gavroche | National Board of Review Award for Best Cast; Satellite Award for Best Cast – Motion Picture; Washington D.C. Area Film Critics Association Award for Best Ensemble; Nominated—Broadcast Film Critics Association Award for Best Acting Ensemble; Nominated—Phoenix Film Critics Society Award for Best Cast; Nominated—San Diego Film Critics Society Award for Best Performance by an Ensemble; Nominated—Screen Actors Guild Award for Outstanding Performance by a Cast in a Motion Picture; Nominated—Young Artist Award for Best Performance in a Feature Film – Supporting Young Actor |
| 2014 | Into the Woods | Jack | Satellite Award for Best Cast – Motion Picture; Nominated—Broadcast Film Critics Association Award for Best Acting Ensemble; Nominated—Empire Award for Best Male Newcomer; Nominated—Phoenix Film Critics Society Award for Best Cast; Nominated—Phoenix Film Critics Society Award for Best Performance By a Youth – Male; Nominated—Young Artist Award for Best Performance in a Feature Film – Supporting Young Actor; Nominated—Washington D.C. Area Film Critics Association Award for Best Ensemble |
| 2015 | Friday Download | Guest | With boyband, Tuxedo |
| 2016 | London Town | Shay | |
| 2016 | The Lost City of Z | Brian Fawcett | |
