= The Billion Dollar Chicken Shop =

2015 British television documentary series

- Also known as: Inside KFC
- Genre: Documentary
- Directed by: Stephen Finnigan, Damian O'Mahony
- Starring: Ralf Little
- Narrated by: Ralf Little
- Composers: Sandy Nuttgens, Spike Scott
- Country of origin: United Kingdom
- Original language: English
- No. of series: 1
- No. of episodes: 3

Production
- Executive producer: Paul Hamann
- Producers: Stephen Finnigan, Damian O'Mahony
- Editors: Gwyn Jones (2 episodes); Mac Mackenzie (1 episode); Jason Savage (1 episode); Maxine Watson (commissioning editor for BBC)
- Running time: 60 minutes
- Production companies: Wild Pictures, BBC

Original release
- Network: BBC One
- Release: 18 March – 1 April 2015

The Billion Dollar Chicken Shop (also known as Inside KFC) is a 2015 British English three-part documentary television miniseries that premiered on BBC One. The series goes behind the scenes of the fast food restaurant chain KFC. The series narrated by Ralf Little, distributed by BBC Television, music composed by Sandy Nuttgens and Spike Scott, executive produced by Paul Hamann, edited by Gwyn Jones, Mac Mackenzie and Jason Savage, directed and produced by Stephen Finnigan and Damian O'Mahony, financed by BBC and also produced by Wild Pictures.

== Premise ==
The Billion Dollar Chicken Shop goes behind the scenes of the fast food restaurant chain KFC.

== Cast ==
- Ralf Little (Himself) as the Narrator

== Production ==
Originally titled Inside KFC. The series was commissioned by Emma Willis, controller of BBC documentaries and announced by Charlotte Moore.

== Broadcast ==
The Billion Dollar Chicken Shop premiered on BBC One in the United Kingdom on 18 March 2015.

== See also ==
- Inside British Airways
- Inside Claridge's
- The Route Masters: Running London's Roads
- Iceland Foods: Life in the Freezer Cabinet
