= List of Hustle episodes =

Hustle is a British television drama series made by Kudos Film & Television for BBC One in the United Kingdom. The programme ran for eight series, each with six episodes, many of which were written by the show's creator Tony Jordan. The following is a list of all 48 episodes.

== Series overview ==
Series	Episodes	Originally released	
Series	Episodes	First released	Last released
1	6	24 February 2004	30 March 2004
2	6	29 March 2005	3 May 2005
3	6	10 March 2006	14 April 2006
4	6	3 May 2007	7 June 2007
5	6	8 January 2009	12 February 2009
6	6	4 January 2010	8 February 2010
7	6	7 January 2011	18 February 2011
8	6	13 January 2012	17 February 2012

== Episodes ==
=== Series 1 (2004) ===
No. overall	No. in series	Title	Directed by	Written by	Original release date	UK viewers (millions)
1	1	"The Con Is On"	Bharat Nalluri	Tony Jordan	24 February 2004	7.23
Michael Stone (alias "Mickey Bricks"), an expert on the "long con", returns to London after being released from prison for assault. Reuniting with his team of grifters – roper and mentor Albert Stroller; banker and lure Stacie Monroe; and fixer Ash "Three Socks" Morgan – he informs them that he plans to do one final con before retiring, and has them target well-connected, greedy politician Peter Williams (James Laurenson). Matters are complicated by the arrival of Danny Blue, a short con player eager to join the team and work with Mickey, who is allowed to assist to prove his worth. Unknown to the team, a police surveillance operation on Mickey is joined by De Palma (Tom Mannion), a detective eager to stop him conning his next mark. When Danny is targeted as the weak link, he finds himself split between remaining loyal to Mickey, or surviving by giving the police what they want.
2	2	"Faking It"	Bharat Nalluri	Tony Jordan	2 March 2004	7.16
Albert is viciously beaten by Frank Gorlay (Robert Pugh), a crooked casino owner, when he catches him cheating at cards. Seeking revenge, the crew find that Gorlay has a passion for classic movies and decide to con him with the "Angel scam". Danny is assigned to play the inside to prove he can follow instructions, after a minor mistake with an earlier con, in order to convince their mark to invest in a non-existent film production. However, while he manages to play the part, none of the crew is unaware how violent Gorlay can be when someone screws with him. Meanwhile, Mickey is faced with a tough decision when his wife comes asking for a divorce, and Albert decides to do something while stuck in hospital recovering from his injuries.
3	3	"Picture Perfect"	Bharat Nalluri	Matthew Graham	9 March 2004	5.75
Mickey learns that, whilst he was in prison, Albert and Ash inadvertently ripped off honest, but desperate businessman Naveen (Rashid Karapiet). He determines the team is jinxed because of this, and can only escape their fate by making amends. When Danny is released from hospital and comes across Meridith Gates (Orla Brady), a ruthless art collector and gallery owner, he quickly proposes to the team that they con her by selling her a fake Mondrian. Despite his concerns about a jinx, Mickey eventually agrees after Danny admits to having already roped in the mark. However, he remains cautious on securing the money they need, not only because of art journalist Bea Watson (Kate Miles), who is being used to influence the mark, but also because they need to rely on forger Tip Jones (Brian Pettifer) who is dubious and untrustworthy, and who likes to set mentally cruel puzzles and games against those who use him.
4	4	"Cops and Robbers"	Minkie Spiro	Tony Jordan	16 March 2004	5.81
Victor Maher (David Calder), a former fraud squad officer now bank security manager, blackmails Mickey into helping him stop bank robber Sam Richards (Richard Harrington), or risk evidence being leaked to the police that could send Danny to prison. Left with no choice, despite Albert warning him not to trust Victor, Mickey arranges for Danny to be kept out of the way while the team work to set up the robber. However, Mickey discovers that the robber is seeking revenge on the bank for bankrupting his family and causing his father to commit suicide as a result. When he realizes Victor has set him up to go down if he works to entrap the robber, Mickey has to rethink how to escape it with the help of his full team, while also ensuring the robber can retrieve what he seeks to steal from the bank – an uncut, valuable diamond that his family had to give to pay off the debt.
5	5	"A Touch of Class"	Minkie Spiro	Ashley Pharoah	23 March 2004	6.74
Katherine Winterborn (Tamzin Outhwaite), a wealthy woman who became recently divorced after killing her ex-husband Steven (Ben Miles)' dog, becomes the team's next mark. They set up 'The Congreve' (based on the quote "Hell hath no fury like a woman scorned") by coercing her into investing in a hotel business which will rival her ex. Mickey develops feelings for Katherine that cloud his judgement and conflict with his life as a con artist. When he cannot bring himself to con her, he decides to reveal the truth to her and walk away from the con. However, he is surprised when she offers to pay him to expose her husband for running a seedy side business within the hotel chain he still retains during an upcoming stock flotation launch. Not thinking straight, Mickey accepts, but as the team prepare to sting her ex, they soon discover things are not as they seem when something unexpected comes to light.
6	6	"The Last Gamble"	Robert Bailey	Tony Jordan	30 March 2004	6.14
Seeing the team becoming stressed out with grifting, Mickey decides they should take a vacation after one more con. Their next mark is Sir Anthony Reeves (David Haig), a former CEO who received a payout of £500,000, despite poor mismanagement for the utility company he worked at. With a weakness for gambling on horse races, the team decide to use a modern-day version of "the Wire" scam, pretending to provide Anthony a guaranteed way of making serious money. However, Danny faces a tough decision when grifter Ray Fordham (Lee Ross) offers him a chance to run his own crew. At the same time, unbeknown to the crew, previous mark Arthur Bond (Philip Jackson) is seeking payback against Mickey and Danny, and is eager to steal the money they intend to take from their latest mark.

=== Series 2 (2005) ===
No. overall	No. in series	Title	Directed by	Written by	Original release date	UK viewers (millions)
7	1	"Gold Mine"	Otto Bathurst	Tony Jordan	29 March 2005	5.94
After returning from their holidays, the team discover that fellow grifter Harry Holmes (Ronald Pickup) has been sent down after attempting to con Howard Jennings (Charlie Creed-Miles), a ruthless property broker who was conned before. Although Albert and Mickey believe he is untouchable, Danny wagers that Howard should be shown that he can be conned again. Opting for a plan that does not use the usual methods of the con, due to the mark being aware of it and using that knowledge to bring down conmen, Danny decides that the team should con the mark into buying land that could be a literal gold mine. However, Mickey becomes concerned that the unconventionial setup being used could lead to disaster, and soon finds himself torn between teaching Danny a lesson that could send everyone down, or bailing him out.
8	2	"Confessions"	Otto Bathurst	Matthew Graham	5 April 2005	5.62
Albert makes amends for ruining a con after going missing when a close friend died in hospital, by putting the team onto Johnny Keyes (Stanley Townsend) – a former gangster turned famous chef. The team learn that their new mark, whose health is on the decline, is desperate to find his long lost son who was kidnapped whilst he was still a baby. While Danny plays the role of Johnny's son, the rest of the team help to ensure he can look the part, as part of an elaborate plan that will convince the mark to hand over money to them through more than just a simple reunion. Meanwhile, Ash becomes concerned for Albert when his friend's death put him into a worrying state of mind, especially when he starts losing at cards.
9	3	"The Lesson"	Alrick Riley	Tony Jordan	12 April 2005	5.26
Danny discovers a potential new member – Trevor Speed (Lee Ingleby) – who he feels could help the crew on their next con. Mickey reluctantly allows him to join, as they prepare to con corrupt former African politician Anthony Mgube, a fond collector of rare currency notes, into buying a forged copy of a rare American banknote. However, a mishap leads to Trevor being kicked out, causing him to spite the team by stealing the original from a collector's widow within London and sell it to the mark, but matters are not as they seem to be. Meanwhile, Stacey ropes in Albert to help her get revenge on sneaky bank manager Paul Hopkins (Rick Warden) after he cheats the team by handing them bank charges they shouldn't have received.
10	4	"Missions"	Alrick Riley	Howard Overman	19 April 2005	6.14
Mickey and Danny find themselves forced to allow DI Samantha Phillips (Fay Ripley), a corrupt police detective who bullies and frames people, into joining them on their next con after she threatens trouble against their local barman Eddie. The team have recently bought a priceless piece of comic book art that is sought out by two avid collectors - fan Neil Davis (Kieran Brew) and collector Gideon Sturock (Mark Tandy) and intend to sell the original to one of the pair, while the other will be conned into bidding for a forgery during an upcoming auction. Although they fail to shake her off, they swiftly convince her to assist on the con when the day of the auction throws up a complication. But when DI Phillips chooses to walk off with the money, she soon learns that the team have been aware of her plans right from the beginning.
11	5	"Old Acquaintance"	John Strickland	Julie Rutterford	26 April 2005	6.54
Stacie is shocked to spot her ex-husband, former short con artist Jake Henry (Max Beesley), whilst the team are preparing to do a score at a casino. Deciding she should get revenge on him, the team opt to rope in Jake into a rigged poker game, in order to con him for walking out on Stacie. Whilst Ash conducts some additional work for her, Mickey becomes concerned when she seems to be having doubts about stinging her husband as the con progresses. When the night of the game begins, things go as planned, until it becomes clear Stacie may be unwilling to remain with the team. However, the team learn she is not as disloyal as she seems to be, when Eddie points out something odd.
12	6	"Eye of the Beholder"	John Strickland	Tony Jordan	3 May 2005	5.42
Mickey presents the team with an audacious plan to steal a part of the crown jewels set – the 530-carat Star of Africa – which is set to be part of a special exhibition hosted in a London museum. Although not eager to begin with, the team are eventually swayed with his idea and get to work setting up the heist, along with the other elements of Mickey's plan. Unbeknown to the crew, the police have been tipped off about the job, and form a special surveillance team in order to monitor and capture them, with the aid of a police detective hoping to get back at Mickey for spoiling a previous operation. But it soon transpires that things are not as they seem to be, and that Mickey's plan is far more than just a heist.

=== Series 3 (2006) ===
No. overall	No. in series	Title	Directed by	Written by	Original release date	UK viewers (millions)
13	1	"Price for Fame"	Otto Bathurst	Tony Jordan	10 March 2006	6.48
Thanks to Danny, the crew return to London with no money and the inability to con their way into staying at a hotel suite. Whilst looking for a decent place to reside, Albert returns with news that their original target Clive Hemmings (Keith Barron) had a heart attack, but that he has found a replacement – Benny Frazier (Mel Smith), a violent pub owner and people-trafficker. Learning he dotes on his son Joey (Benjamin Smith) by providing him anything to help become a budding rapper, despite being rather bad, Mickey assigns Danny to play the inside as a record producer who can help Joey fulfil his dream. Although everything goes smoothly, an oversight on Albert's part places the team in jeopardy. When Danny fears the mark is on to them when his wife behaves oddly in a phone conversation, Mickey is left determining if they will need a back-up plan just in case.
14	2	"Albert's Challenge" "The Henderson Challenge"	Otto Bathurst	Tony Jordan	17 March 2006	5.90
The bitter rivalry between Michael and Danny escalates while they are stuck waiting to finish off a current con. After the pair head out to get ice to make drinks with, Albert reveals a solution to deal with the dilemma – the "Henderson Challenge". Dropped in the middle of London naked, the pair have six hours to grift as much as they can with their skills, from money, clothing, jewellery and so forth, aided by one of the others during that time. While Danny has the edge with his short con skills, Mickey decides to play the long game with a special mark, one he knows can be easily stung. Meanwhile, Albert spends time with Eddie, who is eager to learn how to grift, but soon regrets asking.
15	3	"Ties That Bind Us"	Colm McCarthy	Steve Coombes	24 March 2006	5.74
James Whitaker Wright III (Richard Chamberlain), an American con artist, invites and convinces the team into helping him to take on Cornfoots – a London merchant bank that brought down his great-grandfather, the legendary James Whitaker Wright I in the late 19th century. Their plan follows along that of Wright I – to convince the bank's greedy executives into floating the (fake) "Chad mining" company on the stock market, buying all the shares before they are floated, and then threatening to crash the bank unless they paid out a huge settlement to them, with James pulling off a "cackle bladders" by faking his death. Although the team proceed with the plan, they remain cautious over trusting James, suspecting he might con them himself.
16	4	"A Bollywood Dream"	Colm McCarthy	Danny Brown	31 March 2006	5.64
A retiring concierge gives Albert a new mark for the crew – Kulvinder Samar (Silas Carson), an amoral sweat-shop owner who mistreats his workers. Mickey devises a plan to take advantage of the mark's passion for the Bollywood film industry, but his desire to make everything perfect swiftly makes Kulvinder suspicious of the events they craft. When Danny is distracted by the mark, on the verge of exposing them as con artists, a freak accident leaves Kulvinder with short-term memory loss. Upon hearing of this, Mickey sees this as opportunity for the team to pull off the same con on the same person twice, and redoes the original plan to be less than perfect. However, the crew slowly notice a change in the mark's behaviour as he expresses remorse and guilt for his treatment of his workers, leaving them a moral dilemma when it appears that Kulvinder is changing into an honest man before their eyes.
17	5	"The Hustler's News of the Day"	SJ Clarkson	David Cummings	7 April 2006	5.34
Stacie learns that her close friend Emily Shaw (Lara Cazalet) has just attempted suicide, after a tabloid newspaper, the Weekend World, falsely accused them of embezzling charity funds. The crew agree to help her by conning Francis Owen (Kenneth Cranham), the newspaper's ruthless and immoral editor-in-chief. Mickey devises a plan for them to sell a fake story to him that the Queen Mother died during the 1940s and was replaced by an imposter, with Albert posing as the "imposter's" son. All seems to go well, until Mickey finds MI5 intervening, threatening to cause trouble due to them already disliking the malicious stories Francis prints of the Royal Family. Matters are then complicated when Francis demands DNA proof to back Albert's "claims", leaving Mickey in a difficult spot to find a means of avoiding exposure and ensuring the editor is conned as planned.
18	6	"Law and Corruption"	SJ Clarkson	Tony Jordan	14 April 2006	6.08
The crew find themselves arrested on false charges of drug dealing, after cocaine is planted on them by DCI Matthew York (Ian Puleston-Davies) – a police detective who enjoys publicity from big arrests and doing whatever he can to ensure that happens. The crew finds themselves blackmailed into helping him entrap notorious thief Adam Rice (Paul Nicholls), who is set to steal a valuable manuscript within the jurisdiction of York's rival DCI Neil Cooper (Charles Daish). Keeping Albert in prison and instructing them to help him secure Adam's arrest, the team work to find a way of securing the trust of the thief, while also finding a way out of the trouble that DCI York has given them.

=== Series 4 (2007) ===
No. overall	No. in series	Title	Directed by	Written by	Original release date	UK viewers (millions)
19	1	"As One Flew Out, One Flew In"	Alrick Riley	Tony Jordan	3 May 2007	5.74
With Mickey away in Australia to help with a major con, Albert reluctantly allows Danny to lead the team and pursue a new mark. Finding that Anthony Westley (Robert Wagner) – a corrupt Texan industrialist who uses blackmail to get his own way – is a classic film memorabilia fanatic, Danny arranges for the team to sell him the Hollywood sign. Forced to conduct the con in Los Angeles, the team struggle to complete their jobs well under Danny's leadership, as he tries to maintain his cool and prove he can handle it. When Anthony attempts to outwit them, Danny manages to regain control fast, but is left coming up with a solution to secure his money when he reveals his intentions to keep tabs on his money when its handed off.
20	2	"Signing Up to Wealth"	Lee MacIntosh	Tony Jordan	10 May 2007	5.75
Back in the UK, Danny assumes his mantle as leader by seeking out a new member to join the crew during Michael's absence, though the team are less impressed with who he intends to recruit. During this time, they also focus on their next mark – Dickie Brennan (Jamie Foreman), a ruthless porn baron who desires to have a winning race horse in his possession. Although the team think they can sell him a "ringer", a slight mishap leaves the mark unwilling to pay until his purchase will win, forcing Danny to find a way to ensure that the mark gets what he wants and still be conned. Meanwhile, talented grifter Billy Bond shadows the team, eager to win himself a place amongst them in order to learn under Danny, and finds himself caught up in their latest con.
21	3	"Getting Even"	Lee MacIntosh	Tony Jordan	17 May 2007	5.42
When Eddie reveals he's in serious trouble over outstanding payments for his father's nursing home, the crew agree to help when they learn that Eddie's father risks losing his old home. Danny decides the team must con the nursing home's new owner – Veronica Powell (Patricia Hodge), a ruthless property businesswoman who hiked up the prices to con the residents of their homes – by taking advantage of her love of wine. When an initial plan has to be ditched after the group learn some more about their mark, Danny is left coming up with a new plan that properly tests his abilities as a leader. Meanwhile, Albert finds himself walking down memory lane when he has to side-line a different mark he had arranged, leading Ash to delve more into his past to understand the nature of a story he gave during their current con.
22	4	"A Designer's Paradise"	Stefan Schwartz	Colin Blytheway	24 May 2007	5.76
Clarissa Bartwell (Frances Barber), an immoral woman who holds pricey charity events but secretly keeps most of the proceeds to herself, becomes the team's next mark. Finding she has a weakness in being first in the latest fashion, Danny decides to assign Billy to be the inside man on a con that will trick Clarissa into investing a fashion line that is literally garbage. However, Billy finds himself placed in a difficult position when a face from his past needs urgent help after becoming caught up with dangerous criminals. Matters become further complicated when Clarissa throws a spanner in the works in the form of a financial associate, who proves hard to impress. Left with no choice, Billy opts for the team to throw a fashion show, unaware that the mark and her friend intend to cash in on their scheme.
23	5	"Conning the Artists"	Stefan Schwartz	Nick Fisher	31 May 2007	4.97
The team decide to celebrate another lucrative con that they had conducted against a Japanese restaurant owner, who dabbled in black market goods. However, things suddenly go wrong when, after Eddie leaves to retrieve a lost phone of his, Shiro (Will Yun Lee) an associate of their last mark turns up and threatens trouble, revealing their favourite barman is being held hostage. Faced with a trying scenario, they find themselves working to get out of the situation, but things soon turn out not to be as they seem when it becomes clear they are being tricked.
24	6	"Big Daddy Calling"	Alrick Riley	Tony Jordan	7 June 2007	5.60
During a vacation in Las Vegas, Albert makes the fatal mistake of visiting a casino he had been banned from years ago. When an old friend inadvertently reveals this to the casino's new owner, mafia boss Johnny Maranzano (Chris Tardio), Albert is beaten up for disrespecting his father's ban against the grifter. Upon hearing of this, the crew rush to Vegas, with Danny intent in making Johnny suffer by hitting his prized gem – a fruit machine made in tribute to his late father, which holds a $5 million jackpot. Despite tough security measures, the crew learn that the weak point is a large fish tank which is housed in front of the safe holding the jackpot, allowing it to be seen on display. Danny learns that while the heist must be perfect, they must also outwit Johnny's mafia connections, as it will spell trouble for the crew if they are caught.

=== Series 5 (2009) ===
No. overall	No. in series	Title	Directed by	Written by	Original release date	UK viewers (millions)
25	1	"Return of the Prodigal"	James Strong	Tony Jordan	8 January 2009	6.26
After narrowly avoiding Australian police, but losing all the money he made, Mickey returns to London to resume where he left off. He soon finds that the city has changed, his crew has split up, Eddie has lost his bar and works at a restaurant, and that Albert is currently in prison after being caught cheating. After reuniting with Ash, Mickey decides to take on a mark that Albert has for him – a ruthless and corrupt property developer, who is eager to be involved in the stock market. However, when the pair conduct their con after gaining help from Eddie, they swiftly find the mark and her assistant are in reality con artists themselves, who are unaware of the fact that a previous mark is hunting them down. Note: The opening title sequence was changed following the previous series, but did not include the actors for Emma and Sean Kennedy. This was done for the sequence following this episode.
26	2	"New Recruits"	James Strong	Tony Jordan	15 January 2009	5.90
Michael forms a new crew with Ash, and newcomers Emma and Sean Kennedy, and puts them through their paces with two marks – Carlton Wood (Adam James) and Harry Fielding (John MacMillan), greedy businessman who steal lucrative ideas through their patent company, in order to make money from them. They also learn that the pair caused an inventor to commit suicide, after losing several legal battles when Carlton and Harry stole his new security device to protect valuable artwork from being stolen. Michael devises a scheme to trick the marks into stealing a campaign idea from them, in order to steal a painting set to use the new device, but when Ash finds that it may be impossible to do so, it takes clever thinking to find a way around the problem in order to make the marks suffer when the painting goes missing. Note: Robert Vaughn does not appear in this episode, despite the opening titles featuring his credits in them.
27	3	"Lest Ye Be Judged"	Julian Simpson	Fintan Ryan	22 January 2009	6.30
With Albert due to face a parole hearing, Mickey decides to celebrate his upcoming release by having the crew con Anthony Kent (Tim McInnerny) – a greedy, out-of-touch judge. He reveals to the others that Anthony presided over a case of two men who were convicted of stealing millions in gold bullion that they later hid. Mickey's plan involves the team convincing the mark he get his hand on a portion of the haul he was promised by one of the men, before their death, by convincing him that the other, who committed suicide, is still alive and in hiding. While the crew conduct the con, Ash takes Sean under his wing to teach him more about the grifting game through conning a local therapist with a gambling problem. However, unknown to the team, Albert discovers that a ruthless new prison governor plans to keep him in prison, by discovering what illegal activities he is conducting within.
28	4	"Diamond Seeker"	Julian Simpson	Chris Hurford & Tom Butterworth	29 January 2009	5.73
Frank Brice (Nicholas Ball), a jeweller helping with a con, accidentally gives Mickey and his crew a stolen diamond necklace. When the team try to return it, they learn that the wealthy recluse who ordered the theft, Toby Baxter (Patrick Bergin), has hired violent tracer Pinky Byrne (Mark Bazeley) to recover it, who has just beaten up Brice and his son for their mistake. When others are put at risk, Mickey decides to find a way out for the team, but also to con Toby out of the necklace for the trouble he has caused. Emma is soon given the risky job of meeting the recluse, to throw him off the scent with a false story about someone else stealing the necklace, even if it places her in immediate danger should the mark not believe her.
29	5	"Politics"	Martin Hutchings	Fintan Ryan & Marston Bloom	5 February 2009	5.95
The team find themselves mistaken for real solicitors, shortly after completing a con, by the head of a social group seeking to protect a community centre from demolition. Learning that politician Rhona Christie (Kate Fleetwood), responsible for fast-tracking redevelopment projects, thwarted efforts to save the building, Mickey decides to see if she happens to be corrupt. With Sean working undercover, the team discover she is cleverly taken bribes in secrets to reclassify heritage buildings so that they can be demolished for future developments, and work to not only con her, but also to blackmail her into save the community centre, even if it means cooking up a small scheme to buy them time before the bulldozers move in.
30	6	"The Road Less Travelled"	Martin Hutchings	Tony Jordan	12 February 2009	6.27
Embittered from his experience of being conned by Michael Stone, Carlton Wood, aided by Harry Fielding, recruit three other victims in order to beat the grifter at his own game. Recruiting an old school friend, upper-class twit Alfie Baron (Tom Goodman-Hill), Carlton concocts a scheme to trick Mickey and his crew into attempting to con Alfie of a massive inheritance. However, the sting in the tail is that the group intend to steal the money that Mickey supplies in the convincer, in order to bankrupt him. Although things seem to go to plan, Carlton is soon to learn that his perfect plan has a flaw – one which exposes his plan to major failure. Meanwhile, Eddie looks forward to having a holiday, hoping the crew will take him, but unaware that they seem less interested in letting him come along for free.

=== Series 6 (2010) ===
No. overall	No. in series	Title	Directed by	Written by	Original release date	UK viewers (millions)
31	1	"And This Little Piggy Had Money"	Iain MacDonald	Tony Jordan	4 January 2010	6.84
Following a successful con, Mickey discovers he is being targeted by DCI Lucy Britford (Indira Varma) – a prominent police detective with a reputation for cracking high-profile cases – who has recently been appointed to the Economic Crimes Squad and is eager to bring him down. To make matters worse, she makes clear she knows that his team are planning to con Sir Edmund "Piggy" Richardson (Patrick Ryecart), a former banker who cares less for the working classes and the employees whose jobs he lost. Realising she could be anticipating what he is planning, Mickey is forced to re-think the con in order to ensure the team escape conviction while walking away with the money.
32	2	"The Thieving Mistake"	Iain MacDonald	Fintan Ryan	11 January 2010	6.74
While Albert is away on vacation, the team find themselves facing a difficult situation when an old friend of Ash, bumbling ex-grifter 'Liability' Finch (Mark Benton), asks for their help. Finch reveals that he recently stole a painting in Brazil for a client, but was forced to stow it away in a Brazilian airport locker, after accidentally allowing the alarm to be raised, before returning to the UK. Not willing to be drawn in, the crew refuses to help, but soon discover that Finch is being tailed by ruthless customs agent Clifford Davis (Nick Sidi), who strong-arms the group into helping him bring down their friend for the theft by bringing back the painting. With no choice, Mickey is forced to devise a plan that Finch can't mess up, one that can bring down Clifford as well when he reveals to be also corrupt.
33	3	"Tiger Troubles"	Sarah O'Gorman	Chris Bucknall	18 January 2010	5.89.
Albert finds himself in a difficult position when Phil (Colin Baker), a mark he roped in turns out to be the brother-in-law of a notorious hard man, Czech Charlie (Velibor Topic). When the mark dies, Albert finds that Charlie wants his brother's reward for a (fictional) investment by the end of the week. The team are left desperately looking for a mark, and find it in Luke Baincross (Simon Day), an ageing dishonest playboy facing money trouble after a divorce. The team decide to con him into letting them steal a valuable family possession for a fee – a jewelled tiger – so that he can claim the insurance money for it. However, while they convince him, they discover the theft cannot be done at the house due to a minor problem Luke reveals. With time running out, Mickey is forced to find a way of making the con work, knowing Albert cannot be let down.
34	4	"The Father of Jewels"	Sarah O'Gorman	Mark Chappell & Fintan Ryan	25 January 2010	5.84
Just as Sean is helping the team close a short-con with a "switch" move in a hotel lobby, he is shocked to spot someone he has wanted to get revenge on for years. Emma soon identifies the man as their father Rex Kennedy (Danny Webb) – a property broker who abandoned them and his wife 25 years ago, leaving them to be orphaned at a young age when their mother died. Discovering that Sean will not let the matter go, especially as he wants to con him, Mickey opts to help him out with stinging Rex into believing a site he owns holds a treasure trove. But he soon becomes concerned that Sean may not know what he really wants, forcing him to do something drastic that can allow the Kennedy siblings to find closure with their father.
35	5	"Conned Out of Luck"	Luke Watson	Tony Jordan	1 February 2010	5.95
After Mickey is conned into buying a fraudulent product, ruining his luck, the team decide to go after the owner of the company the product came from. The crew find that their mark, Mervyn Lloyd (Daniel Mays) – a businessman with no moral ethics, who believes he is an entrepreneur – tends to make money while leaving investors to deal with losses. Ash takes charge of the con, and opts to scam Mervyn into poaching a fictional "miracle" invention that can combat pests. But even though the team are eager to con their mark, Ash finds himself struggling to push forward his idea without help from Mickey, even if there is a risk he could jinx the whole con.
36	6	"The Hush Heist"	Luke Watson	Tony Jordan	8 February 2010	6.36
A straightforward con turns out to be police sting, leaving the team at risk of being charged until they are approached with a job by MI6 officers Nigel Chambers (Tom Beard) and Jennifer Hughes (Anna Madeley). Mickey learns that Jennifer, a friend of DCI Britford, offers to have the charges dropped if the team can break into the National Bank of Syria and retrieve the unknown contents of a security box in one of two vaults, with the allowance of stealing whatever money they want from the second vault. Even though the team agree, Mickey is not convinced that the MI6 officers will uphold their word, leading him to not only devise a scheme that can achieve their request, but also ensure the team escape a potential trap.

=== Series 7 (2011) ===
No. overall	No. in series	Title	Directed by	Written by	Original release date	UK viewers (millions)
37	1	"As Good as it Gets"	John McKay	Tony Jordan	7 January 2011	6.84
Albert lines up three new marks, all greedy, arrogant, immoral men, which leaves the crew split on who to con, until Eddie provides information on a fourth mark. The group learn that Eddie's niece was recently conned by a fashion model agency, owned by Wendy Stanton (Anna Chancellor) – a former model turned modelling agent, who cons many women wishing to become a model themselves. The team decide to con her by offering her a fictional contract that requires a model, before stinging her with the "Spanish Prisoner" scam. However, the real challenge is not only the complex nature of getting Wendy to part with her money, but the many other dealings going on behind the scenes.
38	2	"Old Sparks Come New"	John McKay	Chris Lang	14 January 2011	7.04
Emma is surprised when she runs into old flame Joe Ryan (Joe Armstrong) during a small con, and discovers that not only is he a single parent, but he's indebted to a loan company that threatens to repossess his house in Birmingham. The crew swiftly learn that the company's owner is Georgina Althorp (Angela Griffin), an immoral woman who charges exorbitant interest rates to people who desperately seek a loan. Discovering that she is eager to rise up in the world, Mickey decides to con her with a variant of the "Eiffel Tower" scam, by offering her an opportunity to buy a title and a castle. However, both Michael and Ash become concerned when Emma spends time with her former boyfriend and begins questioning whether she can continue as a grifter.
39	3	"Clearance From A Deal"	Roger Goldby	James Payne	21 January 2011	6.84
American casino owner Marcus Wendell (Michael Brandon), a man whose family is notorious for their strict policy on cheaters and grifters, finds himself approached by Michael and Albert during the opening of his family's first casino in Britain. The pair swiftly demand he relinquishes a photograph of Albert's great-grandfather, who was brought down by Marcus' own great-grandfather as a supposed cheat, leading them to be offered a wager – if they can beat the bank on a roulette wheel that Marcus is planning to buy, he will hand it over, otherwise they and their crew will be forced to step down as grifters. Accepting the wager, the group work to undo Marcus, but discover him to be a highly deceptive and smart person. However, unknown to their mark, there is more to their plan than he does not know, and a truth he may never truly accept about his ancestors.
40	4	"Benny's Funeral"	Roger Goldby	Chris Bucknall	28 January 2011	6.97
While seeking to find a betting shop following a funeral of fellow grifter Benny (Denis Lawson), Ash is shocked to discover them very much alive. Benny reveals to the gang that after a string of bad luck, he now owes money to Iranian gangster Danush Larijani (Joplin Sibtain), leading Mickey to offer to help him for saving him in the past from arrest. The team discover that their new mark is not only violent, but is also involved in the illegal sale of duty-free cigarettes, and opt to con him into believing they can supply him with more from a reliable source. However, things are not what they seem to be, and only an unexpected remark about Benny from Eddie clues in Ash to the fact that the team are about to be scammed themselves.
41	5	"The Fall of Railton FC"	Colin Teague	Chris Lang	11 February 2011	6.87
Ash is shocked to discover that his favourite local football club is about to go bust. He reveals to the team that Don Coleman (David Harewood) – a former footballer now working as a ruthless football agent – tricked the club out of a transfer fee they hoped to receive for a young player they had been training up. To con him, the team decide to convince him to help Sean, posing as a Canadian footballer, receive a visa to work in English football, but conning him into helping out with a lucrative deal. Things seem to go well, until Ash suffers an accident that leaves him with a rare phycological condition that makes him unable to tell a lie when directly questioned. Not willing to let the con be stopped, Ash takes the risk of making it continue, until Don refuses to let him have his money unless he can answer a direct question from him.
42	6	"The Delivery"	Colin Teague	Tony Jordan	18 February 2011	6.16
After an all-night card session, the team arrive at Eddie's bar to find a box containing Cool Hand Cooper (Shaun Dooley) – a safe cracker who went down for a bank job several years ago, and has just broken out of prison. The team quickly learn from him that the job he pulled off saw him steal diamonds that happen to belong to gangster Carlo Bachini (Vincent Riotta), who seeks to recover them and has killed off those Cooper worked with on the job. Michael decides they must recover the diamonds, buried on a plot of land that has since become a police station, and ensure that the mafia will not come after them in the process. Meanwhile, Albert is shocked to reunite with Susan (Hannah Gordon), a face from the past, who brings him news that could change his life forever.

=== Series 8 (2012) ===
No. overall	No. in series	Title	Directed by	Written by	Original release date	UK viewers (millions)
43	1	"Gold Finger"	Alrick Riley	Tony Jordan	13 January 2012	6.51
Following a series of cons related to the upcoming 2012 Olympics, Albert supplies the team with a new mark in the form of Dexter Gold (Paterson Joseph). The group learn that their mark is not only a gold dealer who runs a fraudulent cash-for-gold company, but also fences gold for criminals. Upon learning he has a passion for war films, Mickey devises a scheme into conning him into believing the team are a renegade army unit looking to offload a consignment of looted Libya gold. Knowing their mark is well connected in criminal circles, the team have to ensure he will not discover he is being conned, using a rather deceptive plan to prevent him holding onto their consignment. Meanwhile, Eddie bars the team from his bar, after three of them deface the picture of his favourite football player, leaving the group to find a way to get back in his good books.
44	2	"Picasso Finger Painting"	Adrian Lester	Tony Jordan	20 January 2012	5.88
When trying to capitalise on the theft of a rare Picasso, Ash and Mickey make the mistake of trying to sell a fake to the original owner – vicious Eastern European gangster Petre Sava (Peter Polycarpou). With Mickey held prisoner by Sava, Ash must lead the team to recovering the stolen painting. They soon discover that a Scottish crew, Gerald (Robert Cavanah) and Bogdan McCrary (Neil Bell), were behind the theft, who did so for renowned gangster Harry Holmes (Martin Kemp), who lost out on purchasing the painting at an auction for his father-in-law. However, they soon discover that not only did the McCrarys betray Harry, but that the original has since been sold to another collector. Left in possession of one of two fakes Harry took possession of, Ash is left with trying to find a solution to save Michael, before Sava kills him.
45	3	"Curiosity Caught the Kat"	Roger Goldby	Ryan Craig	27 January 2012	5.84
Corrupt police detective DI Sid Fisk (Patrick Baladi), who is facing scrutiny over his work, is bribed into helping someone bring down Mickey Stone. Through surveillance, he learns that Mickey's team are set to con their next mark, restaurant critic Linda Runcorn (Nina Sosanya) with an inheritance scam, and decides to go after the Kennedys on belief they are the weak links. Threatening to send down Sean's ex-girlfriend, pickpocket and single mother Kat Farmer (Skye Lourie), with false drug offences, Fisk uses her to spy on the team and set Emma up with a package of drugs. Mickey soon learns that Fisk is willing to bring him down unless he receives a bribe from the grifter, but when he opts to arrest him as he continues with the con, having warned his mark, Mickey soon reveals that the detective was his true target in an elaborate con and police sting.
46	4	"Eat Yourself Slender"	Roger Goldby	Chris Lang	3 February 2012	6.13
When the team's close friend Carol (Jodie Prenger), another grifter, suffers a heart attack after helping in a con, Mickey and Emma discover her condition was due to a sham diet plan. The team learn that the plan's creators, Dean Deville (John Barrowman) and his wife Dana (Raquel Cassidy), are American fraudsters who sell fraudulent products while escaping trouble, investing their ill-gotten gains in artwork regardless of how its obtained. In order to get payback, Michael devises a plan to con the pair into believing he runs a specialist team of thieves and help them secure a priceless piece of artwork they desire to own. However, the real scam involves them witnessing Ash undergo a "miraculous" transformation that involves losing weight during the heist's planning, and convincing them to steal the weight-loss drug he has been using, unaware that will soon regret ever meeting Michael in the first place.
47	5	"Ding Dong That's my Song"	Alrick Riley	Chris Bucknall	10 February 2012	6.10
Albert is horrified when an old haunt of his has been pulled down by Dale Ridley (Mark Williams), a disgraced 1980s game show host. Now a ruthless property tycoon, the team learn he is corrupt, using backhanders to close deals and cleverly avoiding criminal charges for bribery by using rookie staff members to do the deals. Michael decides that the team should con Dale, by having him invest in an opportunity to secure ownership of the former television studios he worked at, knowing he will be eager to be involved in it. Unexpectedly, Ash finds that Alfie, his 11-year-old godson, has been left in his care and desires to be involved in the con. Proving decidedly tricky, Alfie soon creates a problem in the con when Dale witnesses him twice and begins to smell a rat. Realizing this is the case, the team find they may have to find a way to avoid Dale getting the upper hand, but still con him of his money.
48	6	"The Con is Off"	Alrick Riley	Tony Jordan	17 February 2012	6.80
After years of grifting, Mickey finally decides that he wants out, and devises one final long con that can give him and his team a chance to retire. His plan involves conning Madani Wasem (Abhin Galeya), a vicious millionaire who employs a violent enforcer to deal with people who stand up to him, and who is hoping to regain control of his company by making vast sums of money. Despite the risk, the team opt to con him through an elaborate investment scam. However, they soon discover they are not the only ones involved, when Michael, Ash and Albert are shocked to discover that Madani's broker agent is none other than their grifter colleague Stacey Monroe. Although she doesn't understand Mickey's desire to con Madani, she agrees to help, but knows that if things go wrong, the con could be his final one in the fatal way. Fortunately, Mickey has an ace up his sleeve – another grifter, who will ensure things go just as he plans them to.
