= A Very British Airline =

2014 British TV series

- Genre: Factual
- Directed by: James Rogan
- Narrated by: Stephen Mangan
- Country of origin: United Kingdom
- Original language: English
- No. of series: 1
- No. of episodes: 3

Production
- Executive producers: Nick Catliff; Samantha Anstiss
- Producer: James Rogan
- Production locations: London Heathrow Airport; New York Airport; Hong Kong Airport; Chengdu Shuangliu Airport; Cranebank Training Facility; British Airways HQ
- Running time: 60 minutes
- Production company: Lion Television

Original release
- Network: BBC Two; BBC Two HD
- Release: 2 June – 16 June 2014

A Very British Airline is a British documentary television series that was first broadcast on BBC Two between 2 and 16 June 2014. The three-part series goes behind the scenes of British Airways with narration by Stephen Mangan.

== Production ==
The series was commissioned by Janice Hadlow, controller of BBC Two, and Emma Willis, controller of BBC documentaries. In December 2013 Nick Catliff, managing director for Lion Television, said: 'It took a long time to persuade BA to give us access but we are now in the thick of filming.'

Lion Television, the production company behind A Very British Airline, was first associated with British Airways when one of its jumbo jets was dissected for BBC Two's Engineering Giants. Lion Television managed to persuade British Airways to show its cabin crew, engineers and boardroom.

== Episodes ==
=== Episode 1 ===
The first episode in the series looks at British Airways' efforts to escape the financial crisis it has been suffering in recent years, featuring the introduction of the Airbus A380 into its fleet, and cameras go behind 'millionaires door' at Heathrow's Terminal 5 to see what is experienced by the airline's first class passengers. The episode follows the preparation of the first A380 to join the fleet, and then its first flight to Los Angeles. The episode also follows the airline's new cabin crew recruits as they begin their training, and the staff at the British Airways HQ at Waterside with the task of juggling around aircraft when maintenance overruns or when unexpected problems occur.

=== Episode 2 ===
In this episode cameras follow the airline as it launches a new route to Chengdu, China, and investigate the company's major operations out of New York City. It follows a new manager as he begins his new role at New York JFK, and the airline's Chinese airports manager. The episode looks back on the days of supersonic flight, when Concorde was the centre of British Airways' fleet, flying the airline's Blue Ribbon route between London and New York.

=== Episode 3 ===
Having already followed British Airways' cabin crew recruits, the final episode shows the first few cadet pilots to train with the airline on its new Future pilot programme in their final months of the course. The episode also takes a look at what it takes to manage the world's most congested airport, and the efforts of the staff to reduce delays. We see what happens to our bags after check in at the airport, and also what happens to aircraft in the turnaround between flights.

== Critical reception ==
The Daily Telegraph described the documentary as a "missed opportunity" and that it was "remarkably undynamic". The Guardian described it as the "latest in a genre that can be hard to watch without flinching", saying that it presented "an unflattering snapshot of the UK psyche".

== International broadcast ==
The series premiered in Australia on 19 June 2015 on The LifeStyle Channel and was watched by 53,000 viewers, making it the seventh most watched program on subscription television in Australia for the evening.

== See also ==
- Inside KFC
- Inside Claridge's
- The Route Masters: Running London's Roads
- Iceland Foods: Life in the Freezer Cabinet
