= The Aliens (TV series) =

British science fiction television series

- Genre: Comedy-drama; Science fiction
- Created by: Fintan Ryan
- Written by: Fintan Ryan; Jon Brown (one episode)
- Directed by: Jonathan van Tulleken; Lawrence Gough
- Starring: Michael Socha; Jim Howick; Michaela Coel
- Opening theme: "Alive & Amplified" by The Mooney Suzuki
- Composer: Vince Pope
- Country of origin: United Kingdom
- Original language: English
- No. of series: 1
- No. of episodes: 6

Production
- Executive producers: Petra Fried; Matt Jarvis; Murray Ferguson
- Producer: Charlie Leech
- Running time: 46 minutes
- Production company: Clerkenwell Films

Original release
- Network: E4
- Release: 8 March – 12 April 2016

The Aliens is a British science fiction television series created and written by Fintan Ryan. It is set 40 years after aliens land in the Irish Sea and are reluctantly integrated into British society in the fictional city of Troy. Border guard Lewis Garvey, played by Michael Socha, is caught up in the criminal underbelly of Troy as he learns he is himself half-alien.

The six-episode series also stars Michaela Coel, Michael Smiley and Jim Howick, and is produced by Clerkenwell Films for E4. The first episode was released on 8 March 2016. Ryan had previously written BBC shows Never Better and In the Flesh.

== Overview ==
Coel told Radio Times that The Aliens addresses "urgent contemporary concerns" not limited to racism; during the filming of the series at Nu Boyana Film Studios in Bulgaria, she reported she experienced racist attacks. Speaking to The Guardian's Gabriel Tate, Ryan acknowledged links with the show's narrative and the ongoing European migrant crisis: "With immigrants, there's a colonial history that leaves you in debt to them. Here, we don't owe them [the aliens] anything, but they've landed on our planet and we've got to do something with them."

Viral marketing for The Aliens was organised by Channel 4's in-house creative agency 4Creative. Centred on the slogan "Fight Human Oppression", the faux-political campaign interrupted several Channel 4 shows throughout February 2016. It also appeared on radio and cinema, interrupting DCM's usual ident. Shots featured a female member of the "Alien League" asking the viewer for help "fighting human oppression", before being wrestled away.

== Broadcast ==
Following its April conclusion, the show also aired on Space in Canada in May. It concluded on 8 June 2016. In Germany, ZDFneo aired the show in October 2016.

== Cast and characters ==
- Michael Socha as Lewis Garvey
- Jim Howick as Dominic
- Michaela Coel as LilyHot
- Michael Smiley as Antoine Berry
- Holli Dempsey as Holly Garvey
- Trystan Gravelle as Fabien
- Chanel Cresswell as Paulette
- Chetna Pandya as Chief

== Episodes ==
No.	Title	Directed by	Written by	Original release date
1	"Episode 1"	Jonathan van Tulleken	Fintan Ryan	8 March 2016
Lewis is a border guard at the checkpoint that patrols the wall that surrounds the area of the city where the aliens are allowed to live. After a chance encounter with a mysterious alien Lilyhot, his life is thrown into turmoil.
2	"Episode 2"	Jonathan van Tulleken	Fintan Ryan	15 March 2016
Lilyhot convinces Lewis to help his father break out of prison and get safely to Troy.
3	"Episode 3"	Jonathan van Tulleken	Fintan Ryan	22 March 2016
Lilyhot wants to start a gang-war in Troy. Meanwhile, Lewis reluctantly agrees to smuggle drugs through the checkpoint.
4	"Episode 4"	Lawrence Gough	Fintan Ryan	29 March 2016
With his suspicions about Lewis growing, Truss follows him into Troy discovering that Lewis is half-alien.
5	"Episode 5"	Lawrence Gough	Jon Brown and Fintan Ryan	5 April 2016
Dominic is forced to become a hitman, while Lewis is blaming himself for what happened to Truss.
6	"Episode 6"	Lawrence Gough	Fintan Ryan	12 April 2016
Lewis realises he has to bring the conflict to an end.

== Reception ==
The List's Brian Donaldson compared the show to the 2015 Humans, and wrote that "from almost its opening scene, The Aliens dives headlong into the issues it wants to tackle... politicians talking about building walls is barely off the news just now and The Aliens taps right into this." Tim Dowling of The Guardian called "Tremendous fun."

Channel 4 announced in May 2016 that The Aliens would not be renewed for a second series.
