= Stephen Mangan =

British actor (born 1968)

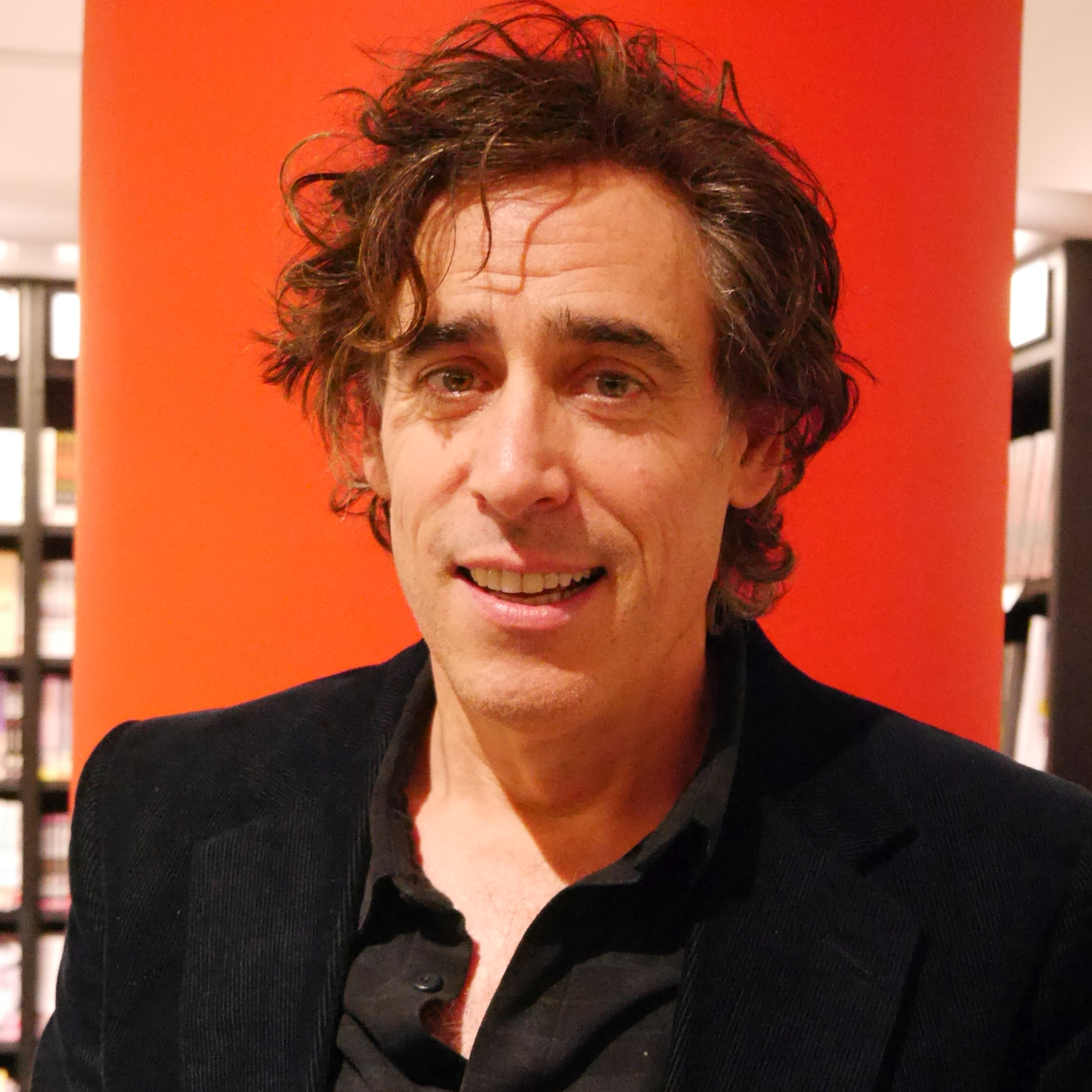
- Mangan in 2023
- Born: Stephen James Mangan; 16 May 1968 (age 58); Ponders End, London, England
- Education: Gonville and Caius College, Cambridge (BA); Royal Academy of Dramatic Art (BA)
- Occupations: Actor; comedian; presenter; writer
- Years active: 1994–present
- Spouse: Louise Delamere (m. 2007)
- Children: 3

Stephen James Mangan (born 16 May 1968) is a British actor, comedian, presenter and writer. He has played Guy Secretan in Green Wing, Dan Moody in I'm Alan Partridge, Seán Lincoln in Episodes, Bigwig in Watership Down, Postman Pat in Postman Pat: The Movie, Richard Pitt in Hang Ups, Adrian Mole in The Cappuccino Years, Andrew in Bliss (2018), and Nathan Stern in The Split (2018–2022). He has presented Artist of the Year since 2018 on Sky Arts.

As a stage actor, he was Tony-nominated for his portrayal of Norman in The Norman Conquests on Broadway. He starred as Bertie Wooster in Jeeves and Wooster in Perfect Nonsense at the Duke of York's Theatre in the West End, which won the 2014 Laurence Olivier Award for Best New Comedy. He co-presented the 2020 edition of Children in Need for the BBC.

== Early life and education ==
Mangan was born on 16 May 1968 in Ponders End, in Enfield, north London, to Irish parents. He has two younger sisters.

Mangan was educated at two private schools, Lochinver House School for boys in Potters Bar, and Haileybury and Imperial Service College (now co-educational), a boarding school in the village of Hertford Heath, Hertfordshire. He was in a school prog rock band called Aragon, which recorded an album called The Wizard's Dream.

Mangan studied for a Bachelor of Arts in Law at Gonville and Caius College, Cambridge, where he appeared in 21 plays, although he did not join the Cambridge Footlights. Mangan took a year out to care for his mother, Mary, who died of colon cancer at age 45. Weeks after her death, he auditioned for the Royal Academy of Dramatic Art and went on to study there for three years.

== Career ==
=== Theatre ===
After graduating from RADA in 1994, Mangan did not pursue lead roles on screen, preferring to take what he saw as the less limited opportunities on the stage. Between 1994 and 2000, he performed in plays throughout the UK and the West End before joining the theatre company Cheek by Jowl for an international tour of Much Ado About Nothing, earning him a nomination for a National Theatre Ian Charleson Award. He worked again for director Declan Donnellan at the Royal Shakespeare Company in School for Scandal, and at the Savoy Theatre in Hay Fever.

In 2008, he played the title role in The Norman Conquests, directed by Matthew Warchus, at The Old Vic and then at the Circle in the Square on Broadway. The production was a huge critical success earning several Tony Award nominations, including one for Mangan himself and won the Tony Award for Best Revival.

In 2012, he appeared at the Royal Court in a Joe Penhall play, Birthday, directed by Roger Michell, playing a pregnant man.

Mangan appeared as Bertie Wooster in Jeeves and Wooster in Perfect Nonsense at the Duke of York's Theatre from October 2013. The production won the 2014 Laurence Olivier Award for Best New Comedy.

=== Television ===
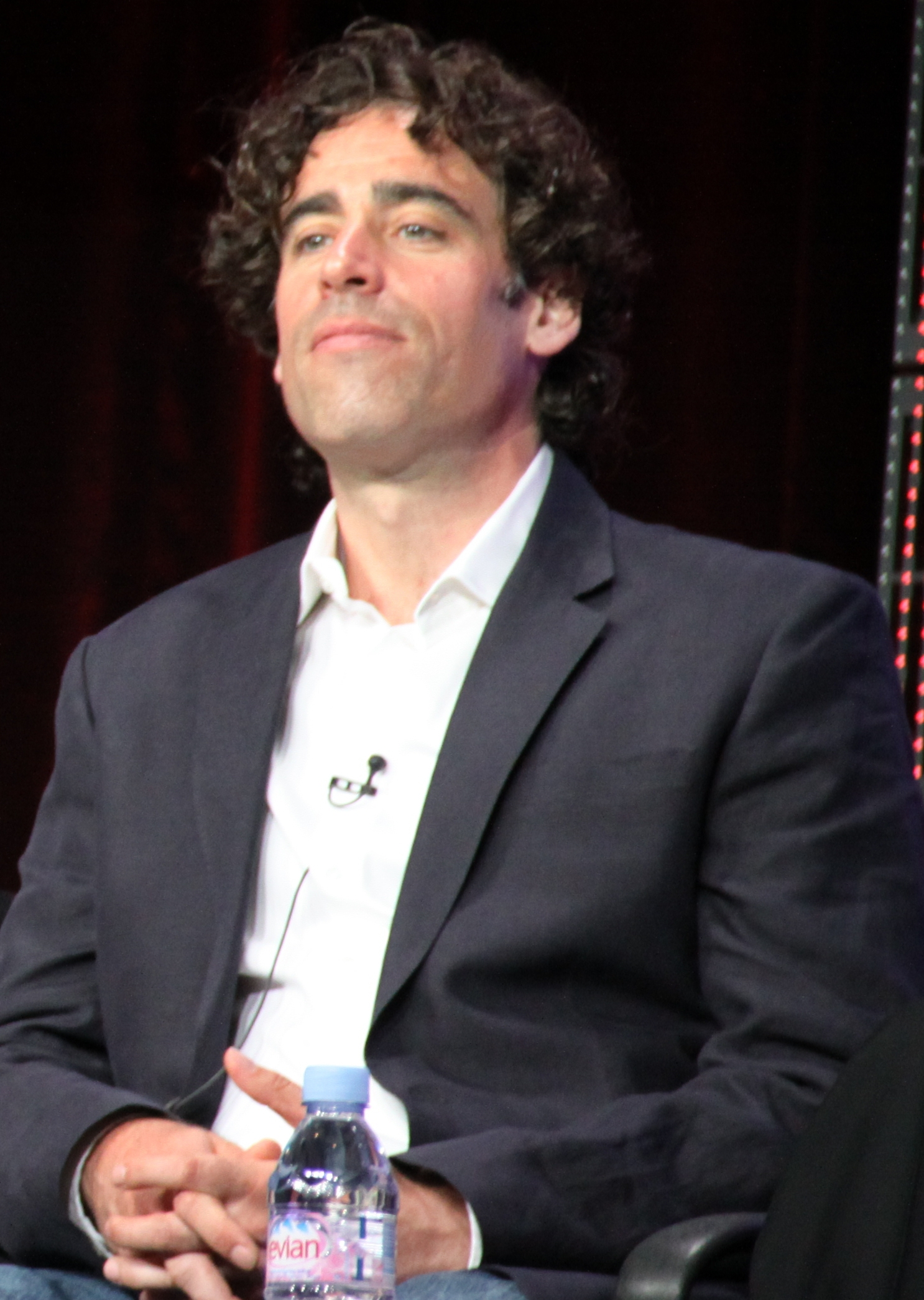
Mangan in 2011

Mangan's breakthrough television performance was as Adrian Mole in the six-part BBC TV show series Adrian Mole: The Cappuccino Years in 2001. That same year he appeared in Sword of Honour on Channel 4, alongside Daniel Craig.

In 2002, he appeared as Dan Moody in the I'm Alan Partridge episode "Bravealan". A scene where Alan repeatedly shouts "Dan!" at Dan from a distance in a car park, while Dan seems not to notice him, was named the second best moment from the series by Metro,

Mangan played Guy Secretan in the British sitcom Green Wing. In Channel 4's The World's Greatest Comedy Characters, Guy was voted 34th. He starred as Keith in Never Better, a British television sitcom on BBC Two. He plays a recovering alcoholic Keith Merchant and Kate Ashfield is his long-suffering wife Anita. The series was written by Fintan Ryan for World Productions.

In 2009, Free Agents, a romantic black comedy starred Mangan, Sharon Horgan and Anthony Head. Originally a pilot for Channel 4 in November 2007, the series began on 13 February 2009. It spawned a short-lived US remake, which was cancelled after just four episodes aired, although four more were later released on Hulu.

He played the title role in Dirk Gently, a British comedy detective drama TV series based on characters from the Dirk Gently novels by Douglas Adams. The series was created by Howard Overman and co-starred Darren Boyd as his sidekick Richard MacDuff. Recurring actors included Helen Baxendale as MacDuff's girlfriend Susan Harmison, Jason Watkins as Dirk's nemesis DI Gilks and Lisa Jackson as Dirk's receptionist Janice Pearce. Unlike most detective series Dirk Gently featured broadly comic touches and even some science fiction themes such as time travel and artificial intelligence. He has said that he was "bitterly upset" at the BBC's axing of the series after four episodes due to a freeze on the licence fee. The four episodes of Dirk Gently were later released on the BritBox streaming service.

He played the title role in "The Hunt for Tony Blair", a one-off episode of The Comic Strip Presents..., a British television comedy, which was first shown on Channel 4 on 14 October 2011. The 60-minute film was written by Peter Richardson and Pete Richens and presented in the style of a 1950s film noir. It stars Mangan as the former British Prime Minister Tony Blair, who is wanted for murder and on the run as a fugitive. The film received its world premiere at the Edinburgh International Television Festival in August 2011. It first aired on Channel 4 on 14 October 2011; it received a mostly positive reaction from reviewers, and was nominated for a BAFTA award (Best Comedy Programme 2012) and the British Comedy Awards (Best Comedy Drama 2011).

He appeared in Episodes, a British-American television comedy series created by David Crane and Jeffrey Klarik and produced by Hat Trick Productions. It premiered on Showtime in the United States on 9 January 2011 and on BBC Two in the UK on 10 January 2011. The show is about a British husband-and-wife comedy writing team who travel to Hollywood to remake their successful British TV series, with disastrous results. Mangan based his performance as Lincoln on his favorite shows from his youth. On 11 December 2013, it was announced that Showtime had renewed Episodes for a fourth season. Episodes has received positive reviews by critics, with many singling out Mangan, Tamsin Greig, and Matt LeBlanc's performances.

In 2018, Mangan played the lead role in a black comedy TV series Bliss, created by American comedian David Cross, which was aired on Sky One and released by the BritBox streaming service. Bliss stars Mangan as Andrew, a fraudulent travel writer, who is struggling to maintain long-term relationships with two partners, Kim (Heather Graham) and Denise (Jo Hartley), who are not aware of one another.

He co-wrote and starred in Hang Ups for Channel 4, which was adapted from the American comedy series Web Therapy. The show was first broadcast in 2018 and had an all-star cast, including David Tennant, Katherine Parkinson, Charles Dance and Richard E. Grant. It received rave reviews and was nominated for two major awards.

Also in 2018, Mangan starred in the BBC legal drama The Split opposite Nicola Walker. He reprised this role in the second series in 2020 and again in the third series in 2022.

In 2020, he co-hosted BBC Children in Need alongside Mel Giedroyc, Alex Scott and Chris Ramsey. He also served as the narrator of ITV's documentary series Who Wants to Be a Millionaire?: The Million Pound Question, which started airing in November 2020.

In May 2022, the BBC announced that Mangan would be one of the guest presenters to take over Richard Osman's role on Pointless.

In 2022, Mangan narrated the documentary and clip show 'Allo 'Allo! Forty Years of Laughter on Channel 5.

In 2023, Mangan narrated the documentaries and clips shows Keeping Up Appearances - 30 Years Of Laughs, One Foot in the Grave - 30 Years Of Laughs and Birds of a Feather - 30 Years Of Laughter for Channel 5.

In November 2023, Mangan appeared on a celebrity edition of The Weakest Link and reached the head-to-head round against Ed Byrne.

In 2024, Mangan appeared as the host of Series One of The Fortune Hotel, a reality competition series, set in a luxury hotel in the Caribbean with a prize fund of £250,000. The show went on to film Series Two the following year for ITV.

In October 2025, Mangan appeared on a special battle of the nations edition of The Weakest Link where he represented England alongside Leomie Anderson and was voted off in the fifth round by Paul Brand and Amy Macdonald.

=== Film ===
Mangan's first film part was as Doctor Crane in Billy Elliot, which was released in 2000. In 2001, he appeared in the Miramax film Birthday Girl, starring Nicole Kidman and Vincent Cassel; in the same year he appeared as French cabaret singer Pierre Dupont in the film Chunky Monkey alongside David Threlfall and Alison Steadman. In 2002, he appeared opposite Keira Knightley in the short New Year's Eve.

He played the leading role in 2003's SuperTex, a Dutch film directed by Jan Schütte and filmed in English. In 2005, he played a comedian in Festival, a British black comedy film about a number of people at the Edinburgh Festival Fringe, directed by Annie Griffin. The general shots of the festival were filmed during the 2004 event. Mangan was nominated for a Scottish BAFTA for his performance. He also played Josef in 2006's Confetti.

He starred in Beyond the Pole, a 2010 British mockumentary adapted from the BBC radio series of the same name. It received its UK cinema release in 2010. It was directed and produced by David L. Williams. The film was shot on floating sea ice off the coast of Greenland, and stars a cast of actors and comedians including Mangan, Rhys Thomas, Mark Benton, Alexander Skarsgård and Helen Baxendale. Variety magazine described the film as a cross between The Office and Touching the Void.

In 2013, Mangan played Alastair Caldwell in Rush, a British-German biographical sports drama film centered on the rivalry between race car drivers James Hunt and Niki Lauda during the 1976 Formula One motor-racing season. It was written by Peter Morgan, directed by Ron Howard and stars Chris Hemsworth as Hunt and Daniel Brühl as Lauda. The film premiered in London on 2 September 2013 and was shown at the 2013 Toronto International Film Festival before its UK and US theatrical releases on, respectively, 13 and 20 September 2013.

In 2014, Mangan voiced the title role in Postman Pat: The Movie, a British animated comedy film featuring Postman Pat, star of a long-running BBC children's series. It was originally due to be released on 24 May 2013, but was pushed back to a year later. Pat's singing voice was performed by Ronan Keating. Other voice actors in the film included Jim Broadbent, Rupert Grint, and David Tennant.

In 2020, it was announced Mangan is to write his first film, an adaptation of the children's novel Harry And The Wrinklies.

=== Radio ===
Mangan was announced in January 2024 as being a new presenter on Global's Classic FM, specifically hosting a Sunday afternoon (4pm) show.

In February 2025, he was the castaway for BBC Radio 4's Desert Island Discs. From 17 February 2025, Mangan is to star in a new desert island comedy, alongside other "castaway" celebrities, from previous editions of the programme.

=== Other ===
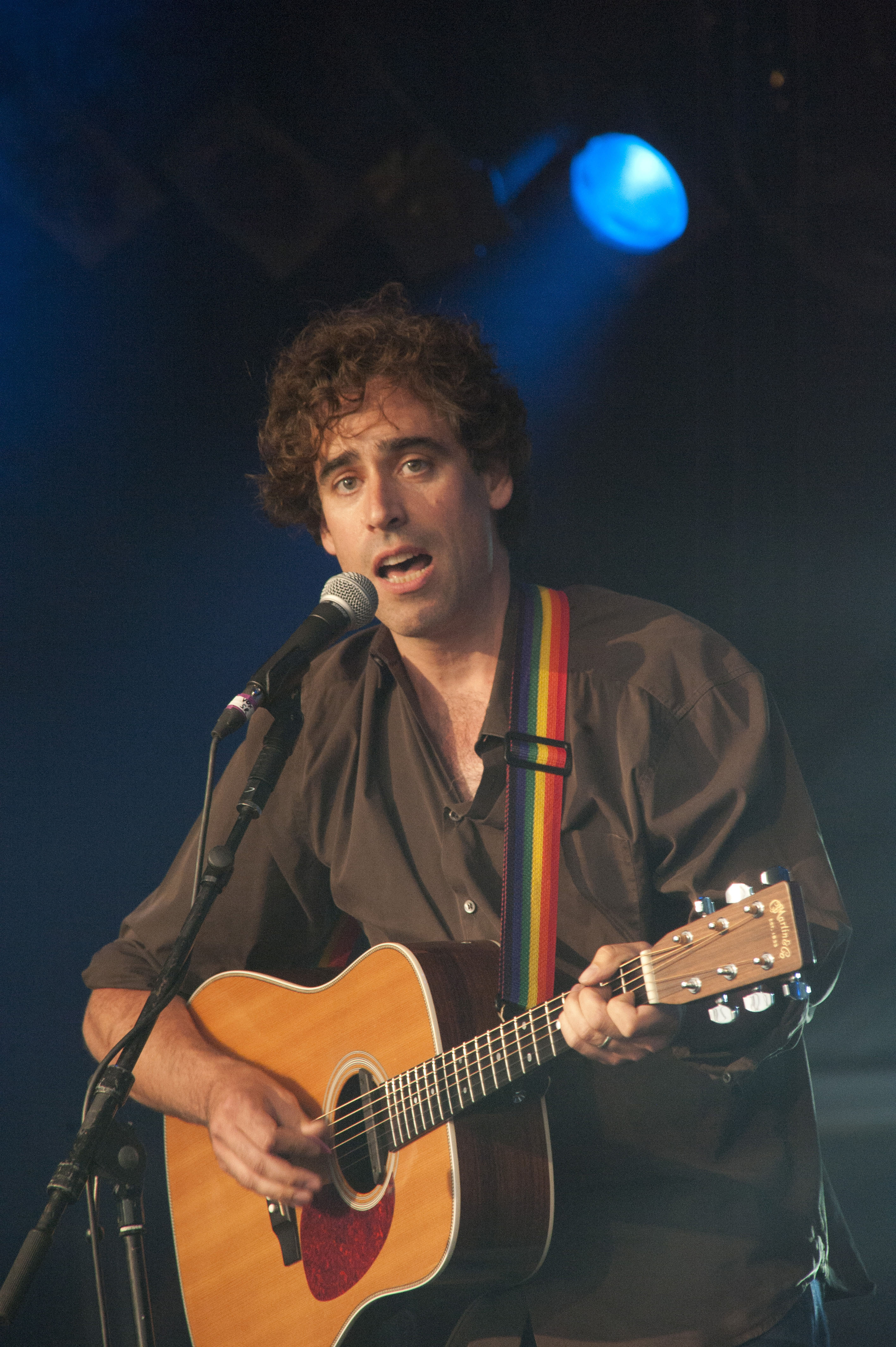
Mangan at Cambridge Folk Festival in 2011

Mangan was host of the Evening Standard British Film Awards for four years (2009–2013). On 27 April 2014, he returned to host the British Academy Television Craft Awards in London for a third time. Mangan recorded several roles in the Arkangel Shakespeare audiobook series, directed by Clive Brill. Mangan has been one of the hosts of Artist of the Year since 2018.

== Personal life ==
His father, James, died of a brain tumour at the age of 63. Mangan backed the 2020 National Brain Appeal, a charity supporting research at the National Hospital for Neurology and Neurosurgery, with a unique online art gallery exhibition sale.

Mangan has been married to actress Louise Delamere since 2007. They live in Primrose Hill, north London and have three sons.

He is a fan of Tottenham Hotspur and goes to games with Tamsin Greig's husband Richard Leaf.

In August 2014, Mangan was one of 200 public figures who were signatories to a letter to The Guardian expressing their hope that Scotland would vote to remain part of the United Kingdom in that year's referendum on the issue.

In 2023, Mangan and his sister Anita appeared together on Celebrity Gogglebox.

== Performances and works ==
=== Film ===
Year	Title	Role	Notes
2000	Billy Elliot	Dr. Crane	
2001	Offending Angels	Fergus	
2001	Birthday Girl	Bank manager	
2001	Chunky Monkey	Pierre DuPont	
2002	New Year's Eve	David	
2003	SuperTex	Max Breslauer	
2005	Festival	Shaun Sullivan	
2006	Confetti	Josef	
2006	Someone Else	David	
2009	Beyond the Pole	Mark	
2013	Rush	Alastair Caldwell	
2014	Postman Pat: The Movie	Postman Pat / PatBot 3000 (voice)	
2017	Breathe	Dr. Clement Aitken	
2019	Pets United	Bob (voice)	
2022	A Gaza Weekend	Michael	

=== Television ===
Year	Title	Role	Notes
1999	Watership Down	Bigwig (series 1–3), Silverweed, Shale (series 3 only)	Voices only
1999	Big Bad World	Justin	
2000	In Defence	John Henderson	
2000	Human Remains	Clown	
2001	Sword of Honour	Frank De Souza	
2001	The Armando Iannucci Shows	Television Executive	
2001	Thunder Pig!	Leon	Voice only; pilot
2001	Horizon	Narrator	
2001	Adrian Mole: The Cappuccino Years	Adrian Mole	
2002	I'm Alan Partridge	Dan Moody	Season 2, episode 3
2003	Seven Wonders of the Industrial World	Jules Isidore Dingler	
2003	Ready When You Are, Mr. McGill	Roland	
2003	Lucky Jim	Bertrand	
2004	End of Story		
2004	Wren: The Man Who Built Britain	Robert Hooke	
2004	Green Wing	Guy Secretan	Two series (2004–2007)
2005	Sunday Pants	The Imp	Voice only
2005	Nathan Barley	Rod Senseless	
2005	Bromwell High	Gavin	Voice only
2005–2006	Jane Hall	Robert	
2006	A Funny Thing Happened on the Way to the Studio		
2006	Britain's Biggest Spenders	Narrator	
2006	MTV ScreenPlay	Presenter	
2006	Is It Just Me or Is Everything Shit?		Pilot episode
2007	Agatha Christie's Marple	Inspector Larry Bird	Agatha Christie's Marple, series 3
2007	Hyperdrive	Green Javelins	
2007	Who Gets the Dog?	Steve Hollister	TV film
2008	Never Better	Keith	
2009	Free Agents	Alex	
2009	Never Mind the Buzzcocks	Himself, guest	
2009–2010	Would I Lie to You?	Himself, guest	
2010	Richard Bacon's Beer & Pizza Club	Himself, guest	
2010	Three in a Bed	Narrator	
2011	Rome Wasn't Built in a Day	Narrator	
2011	Celebrity Mastermind	Himself, contestant	
2011	Have I Got News for You	Himself, host	Series 41, episode 2 & series 42, episode 4
2011	Meet the Middletons	Narrator	
2011	The Hunt for Tony Blair	Tony Blair	
2011	All Roads Lead Home	Himself, co-presenter	
2011–2017	Episodes	Sean Lincoln	Main role
2012	Just a Minute	Himself, contestant	
2012	Dirk Gently	Dirk Gently	Following pilot episode
2012	Have I Got News for You	Himself, host	Series 43, episode 1
2013	Have I Got News for You	Himself, host	Series 45, episode 1
2013	Fifteen to One	Himself, contestant	Celebrity special
2013–2014	Barely Legal Drivers	Narrator	Series 1
2013–present	Artist of the Year	Presenter	Series 1–5
2014	8 Out of 10 Cats Does Countdown	Himself, contestant	
2014	A Very British Airline	Narrator	Series 1
2014	Wild Brazil	Narrator	
2014	The IT Crowd Manual	Narrator	
2015	Birthday	Ed	
2016	Houdini & Doyle	Arthur Conan Doyle	ITV Encore series
2016	Have I Got News for You	Himself, host	Series 51, episode 1 & series 52, episode 2
2017	The Fake News Show	Himself, host	
2017	Olobob Top	Narrator	Animated series
2017	Have I Got News for You	Himself, host	Series 54, episode 7
2018	Bliss	Andrew Marsden	Main role
2018	Hang Ups	Dr. Richard Pitt	Also co-writer
2018–2022	The Split	Nathan Stern	TV series
2019	Top Gear	Himself, guest	
2019–2020	101 Dalmatian Street	Doctor Dave	Recurring character
2020	BBC Children in Need	Himself, co-host	
2020–2021	Who Wants to Be a Millionaire?: The Million Pound Question	Himself, narrator	ITV series, 6 episodes
2021	Love Your Weekend with Alan Titchmarsh	Himself, guest	
2022	Pointless	Himself, co-host	
2022	'Allo 'Allo! Forty Years of Laughter	Narrator	Documentary
2022	Mel Giedroyc: Unforgivable	Himself	Series 3, episode 5
2022	Travel Man: 96 Hours in Rio	Himself	Christmas special
2023	World's Most Dangerous Roads	Himself	with Lara Ricote
2023	Keeping Up Appearances - 30 Years Of Laughs	Narrator	Documentary
2023	One Foot in the Grave - 30 Years Of Laughs	Narrator	Documentary
2023	Birds of a Feather - 30 Years Of Laughter	Narrator	Documentary
2023–present	Celebrity Gogglebox	Himself; alongside his sister	Series 5 and 6
2023–2025	The Weakest Link	Himself, contestant	Series 3 and 5
2024–2025	The Fortune Hotel	Himself, host	ITV series
2024	Password	Himself, host	Game show; team captains: Alan Carr and Daisy May Cooper
2025	Have I Got News for You	Himself, host	Series 69, episode 7

=== Theatre ===
Year	Title	Role	Venue
1994–1995	Georges Dandin	Clitandre	Redgrave Theatre
1995	The Tempest	Ferdinand	International Tour
1995	Twelfth Night	Sebastian	Nottingham Playhouse
1995	Mrs Warrens Profession	Frank	Redgrave Theatre Farnham
1996	The Rover	Belville	Salisbury Playhouse
1996	Couch Grass and Ribbon	Jack	Watermill Theatre
1996	Hamlet	Laertes	Norwich Theatre Royal
1997	The Shoe Shop of Desire	Bobby	UK Tour
1997	As You Like It	Orlando	Nottingham Playhouse
1997	She Stoops to Conquer	Marlow	Birmingham Stage Company
1998	The School for Scandal	Sir Benjamin Backbite	Royal Shakespeare Company
1998–1999	Much Ado About Nothing	Don Pedro	International Tour
1999	Hay Fever	Simon Bliss	Savoy Theatre
2001	Noises Off	Gary Lejeune	Piccadilly Theatre
2002	The People Are Friendly	Robert	Royal Court Theatre
2005–2006	The Magic Carpet	Miloshin	Hammersmith Theatre
2008	The Norman Conquests	Norman	The Old Vic Theatre
2009	The Norman Conquests	Norman	Circle in the Square Theatre
2012	Birthday	Eddie	Royal Court Theatre
2013–2014	Perfect Nonsense	Bertie Wooster	Duke of York's Theatre
2015	Rules for Living	Adam	National Theatre Dorfman
2018	The Birthday Party	Goldberg	Harold Pinter Theatre
2019	The Man in the White Suit	Sidney Stratton	Theatre Royal, Bath and Wyndham's Theatre
2021	A Christmas Carol	Ebenezer Scrooge	The Old Vic
2025	Unicorn	Nick	Garrick Theatre
2026	The Truth	Michel	Apollo Theatre

=== Radio ===
Title
The Winter's Tale
Cymbeline
Wild Things
Othello
The Man Who Knew Everything
Into Exile
Jack the Giant killer
Gordon Springer
As You Like It
A Midsummer Night's Dream
Last Act (2006, radio series)
Number 10 (2007, radio series)
ElvenQuest (2009 – 2011, radio series)
Lunch (2013 – 2014, radio series)
Classic FM (2024 – present, Sunday Afternoons)
The History of Mr Polly (2025, two-part dramatisation)

=== Audio ===
Year	Title	Role	Notes
2003	As You Like It	Orlando	part of The Complete Arkangel Shakespeare
2003	Cymbeline	Cloten	part of The Complete Arkangel Shakespeare
2003	Henry VIII	Earl of Surrey	part of The Complete Arkangel Shakespeare
2003	Measure for Measure	Lucio	part of The Complete Arkangel Shakespeare
2003	Othello	Roderigo	part of The Complete Arkangel Shakespeare

=== Bibliography ===
- Escape the Rooms (Scholastic, 2021) ISBN 9781407193625
- The Fart that Changed the World (Scholastic, 2022) ISBN 9780702315008
- The Unlikely Rise of Harry Sponge (Scholastic, 2023) ISBN 9780702329210
- The Great Reindeer Rescue (Scholastic, 2023) ISBN 9780702330827
- The Day I Fell Down the Toilet (Scholastic, 2024) ISBN 9780702330834
