= Is It Just Me? =

Is It Just Me or Is It Just Me? may refer to:

== Music ==
- Is It Just Me?, a song from the 1973 musical The Card
- Is It Just Me, a 1994 song by Bryan Austin
- Is It Just Me? (song), 2006 song by the British rock the Darkness
- Is It Just Me, a 2019 song on the DNA (Backstreet Boys album)
- Is It Just Me, a 2019 song by Emily Burns and JP Cooper
- Is It Just Me?, a 2020 song by Sasha Alex Sloan
- Is It Just Me?, a 2025 song by Mike Posner

== Publications ==
- Is It Just Me, a recurring feature in Total Film magazine
- Is It Just Me?, a 1990s newspaper column in the Oklahoma Gazette written by Mark Houston
- Is It Just Me?, a 2012 book written by Miranda Hart

== Other ==
- Is It Just Me? (film), 2010 film directed by J.C Calciano

== See also ==
- Is It Just Me or Is Everything Shit?
