= Pilot (Dirk Gently) =

- Dirk Gently episode
- Titlescreen of the pilot, based on Gently's painted whiteboard.
- Episode no.: Episode 1
- Directed by: Damon Thomas
- Written by: Howard Overman
- Story by: Douglas Adams
- Original air date: 16 December 2010
- Running time: 1 hour

Episode chronology
← Previous —	Next → "Episode 1"

The pilot episode of Dirk Gently is the first broadcast episode of the BBC Four television series inspired by Douglas Adams's novel Dirk Gently's Holistic Detective Agency. First broadcast on 16 December 2010 and repeated throughout the Christmas period, it was written by Howard Overman and stars Stephen Mangan as holistic detective Dirk Gently and Darren Boyd as his sidekick Richard Macduff. Recurring actors include Helen Baxendale as Susan Harmison, Jason Watkins as DI Gilks and Lisa Jackson as Janice Pearce.

In the hour-long pilot, "holistic detective" Dirk Gently is hired by an old lady to investigate the disappearance of a cat, a case that gives him a new fridge and re-acquaints him with two old friends from university. Together they uncover a plot involving time travel, unrequited love, depression and murder.

The comedy-drama is a loose adaptation of plot elements from Adams' 1987 novel Dirk Gently's Holistic Detective Agency, although it updates the detective to the present day and focuses on only a few of the original novel's characters and plot threads. Critical reception to the pilot was generally positive, and in March 2011 BBC Four announced that it had commissioned a three-part series of one hour-long episodes, the first continuing drama series produced for the channel.

== Production ==
Shooting commenced early in October 2010 in Bristol. The director was Damon Thomas and the producer was Chris Carey. Although it was commissioned by the BBC, it was produced by ITV Studios with The Welded Tandem Picture Company. The pilot was first broadcast on BBC Four on 16 December 2010 and was repeated a number of times during the next month. The pilot gained a commission on 31 March 2011 for a three-part series of one hour-long episodes to be broadcast on BBC Four in 2012.

The screenplay by Howard Overman is not a direct adaptation of Adams's novel, but uses certain characters and situations from the novel to form the basis of a new drama centred on Dirk. Stephen Mangan, writing a BBC blog on the programme stated "In my opinion, Dirk Gently's Holistic Detective Agency and The Long Dark Tea-Time Of The Soul are unfilmable as written...too much happens, there are too many ideas".

The pilot concentrates on two relatively minor plot strands in Dirk Gently's Holistic Detective Agency: the disappearance of a cat, and the simultaneous disappearance of millionaire Gordon Way. Although time travel is involved in the solution, the novel's entire St Cedd's College / Electric Monk / Coleridge strand is omitted, although key words relating to these elements do appear on Dirk's whiteboard when it is first seen, though they are never subsequently referred to. The setting is updated to 2010, with email and voicemail replacing the answering machine messages in the book. There are changes to the characters too, one notable one being that Susan is Gordon's ex-girlfriend rather than his sister.

== Cast ==
Stephen Mangan, best known for his role in the television series Green Wing, and subsequently Episodes, was cast in the main role as holistic detective Dirk Gently. Mangan already knew the novel and the author's works, stating in a press release "I've been a fan of Douglas Adams ever since the Hitchhiker's radio series which I used to record as a child and listen to over and over again in my bedroom. It's such a thrill to now be playing one of his brilliant characters. Dirk is a chaotic, anarchic force of nature with a totally unique take on the world. He is described as 'lazy, untidy, dismissive and unreliable'. I've absolutely no idea why they thought I'd be right for the role." Cast alongside him were Darren Boyd and Helen Baxendale, both of whom had previously worked with Mangan in Green Wing and Adrian Mole: The Cappuccino Years respectively.

The pilot also featured Doreen Mantle as Ruth, Anthony Howell as Gordon Way, Miles Richardson as Dr Gerstenberger and Billy Boyle as Harry.

== Plot ==
The episode opens with private investigator Dirk Gently asking the elderly Mrs Jordan for payment in his ongoing search for her missing cat Henry. Leaving Mrs Jordan's house, he witnesses his old friend Richard McDuff breaking into her neighbour's house. It transpires that Richard was attempting to steal a laptop belonging to his girlfriend Susan Harmison, whom Richard has just split up with and has sent an insulting e-mail, which he now regrets.

On spotting clues suggesting the presence of the missing cat, they follow it into a nearby warehouse and encounter a bizarre machine. However, an explosion destroys the machine before they can investigate. It later transpires that the warehouse belongs to their fellow university alumnus, Gordon Way, a millionaire computer expert (and Susan's former suitor at college) who has gone missing.

Dirk soon deduces that events all seem to connect with 5 December 1994, as that is the date where Susan broke up with Gordon because he missed a date (due to Dirk accidentally running Gordon over in his Austin Princess, when trying to escape an angry Richard), and the date on which Mrs Jordan's first cat, George, walked into her house. Recalling the equipment that he and Richard found in a warehouse near Susan's house, Dirk deduces that Gordon Way had developed a time machine to go back and save his relationship with Susan before it went wrong, with Mrs Jordan's cat getting into the machine with him and being sent back to the past (meaning that Mrs Jordan's two cats were actually the same cat).

Gordon, it is revealed, was killed in the past by Mrs Jordan after he saw her with her husband's dead body (Mrs Jordan having killed her husband when he began to mistreat the 'new' cat). Mrs Jordan subsequently commits suicide after tricking Dirk, Richard and Susan into leaving her so that she will not have to go to prison. At the episode's conclusion, Dirk has tricked Richard, via hypnosis, into investing his redundancy money into Dirk's firm, allowing Dirk to go to Barbados on an "investigation" while Richard is left as Dirk's new partner in the detective agency.

== Reception ==
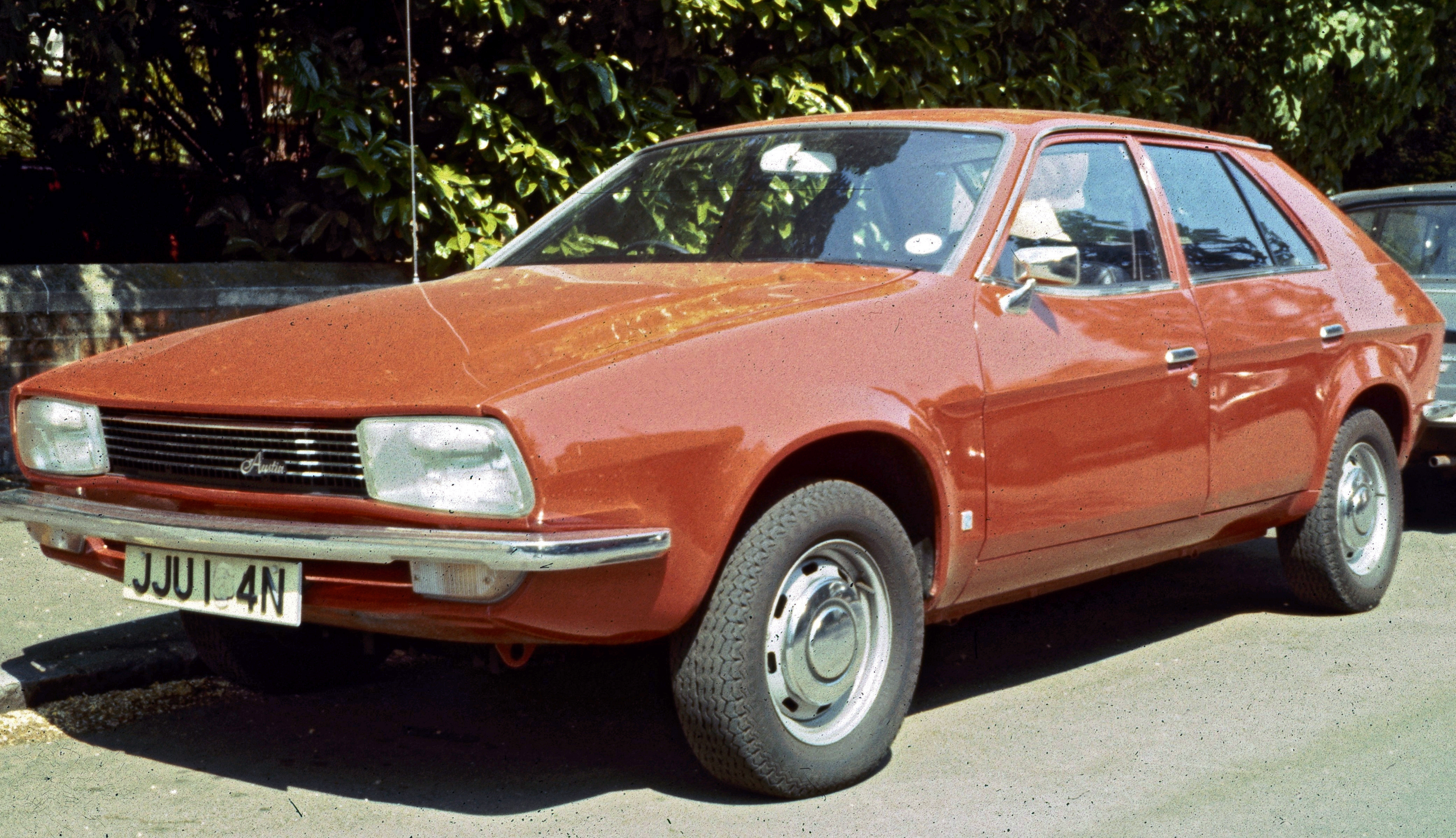
Dirk drives an elderly brown Austin Princess in the production.

The pilot episode gained 1.1m viewers (3.9% share) on BBC Four, which was over three times the channel's slot average. Critical reception for the pilot was largely positive. Several mentioned that it was only a loose adaptation of the novel, although the general consensus was that the essence of the original was maintained. Sam Wollaston in The Guardian stated "Coming to it fresh, it's a neat story about aforementioned missing cat and time travel, with a smattering of quantum physics and the fundamental connectedness of things. With a lovely performance from Doreen Mantle as the old lady/murderer. Stephen Mangan's good in the title role, too – a teeny bit irritating perhaps, but then Mangan is a teeny bit irritating. So is Dirk Gently, though – it's perfect. Funny too. Quite funny." James Donaghy, also writing in The Guardian stated "Personally I hope Dirk Gently gets made into a full series. The programme shows promising glimpses, has a strong cast and Misfits already proves Overman can write. And a BBC4 adaptation feels like a good fit – Gently being exactly the kind of playground-of-the-imagination curio the BBC made its name indulging."

The Independent published two reviews. Alice-Azania Jarvis was extremely positive, writing "...there wasn't very much you could fault about the production at all. Right down to the quirky camerawork and youthful, poppy soundtrack (who would have thought the Hoosiers could be so right in any situation?), the director, Damon Thomas, got it pretty spot-on. The result was a pleasingly festive-feeling adventure; part Wallace & Gromit, part Doctor Who, part The Secret Seven. And the best thing? There wasn't a Christmas tree in sight. Douglas Adams once claimed that Gently would make a better film character than his more famous hero, Arthur Dent. Based on last night's experience, he may well have been right." John Walsh's review for The Independent was cooler about the adaptation, although he praised Mangan's performance: "Given the talent and style on display, it should have been a scream. In fact it all seemed a little moth-eaten. Though set in the modern day, it was staggeringly old-fashioned...You could overlook these faults, however, for the joy of Stephen Mangan's performance as the titular gumshoe. With his alarmed-spaniel eyes and jutting-jawed stroppiness, his geography teacher elbow-patches and Medusan hair, he radiates mess...His ineptness as a sleuth provided some fine comic moments."

Keith Watson in Metro was also positive, although he noted "At times it felt forced, with a sense of trying slightly too hard when a touch more subtlety would have brought out the essential Adamsian eccentricity." Dan Owen of Obsessed with Film noted that the adaptation played with the idea of inexplicable situations: "Purists may grumble this isn't the Dirk Gently they wanted to see, but it's more accessible and practicable. And while Dirk Gently is certainly another gimmicky detective series (yawn), its details are unique and engrossing enough to shrug off the genre's clichés. In some ways it's a pastiche of whodunits, taking the genre's often tenuous explanations to an outrageous extreme."

Paul Whitelaw in The Scotsman noted that "Although Adams's more ambitious concepts are sidelined in favour of a more prosaic – if nonetheless enjoyable – sci-fi mystery, Overman captures at least some of the wit and whimsy of his distinctive comic voice" going on to suggest "This modestly budgeted pilot suggests potential for a series, so the deviation from Adams's originals makes sense. It also adds yet another very British oddball to the pantheon currently occupied by Doctor Who and Sherlock.

== See also ==
- Dirk Gently (TV series)
