= Barely Legal Drivers =

British television series

- Narrated by: Stephen Mangan
- Country of origin: United Kingdom
- Original language: English
- No. of series: 2
- No. of episodes: 12

Production
- Producer: Guy Templeton (Series 1) Sara Woodford (Series 2)
- Running time: 60 mins
- Production company: Renegade Pictures

Original release
- Network: BBC Three
- Release: 2 April 2013 – 16 June 2014

Related
- Driving School; Britain's Worst Driver

Barely Legal Drivers is a BBC series which follows teenagers' driving habits and style, unaware to the teenagers the parents are watching each journey and they are being assessed by a former traffic officer. At the end of the week, depending on the style of driving, the teenagers either win a free car or an advanced driving course. The series is narrated by Stephen Mangan.

== Concept ==
The teenagers are led to believe that they are filming a slice of modern teenage life, but in reality they are being judged on their driving. Each participant takes three trips; each trip will be watched by their parents, an ex-traffic officer Judith Roberts and driving instructor John Lepine MBE (Series 2 only). After each participant has completed three trips ex-traffic officer Judith Roberts will make a decision based on their driving. If they have shown they are a safe driver, they will be given the cash to buy their own car, but if they have shown they are a dangerous driver they will be given advanced driving lessons.

== Episodes ==
=== Series 1 (2013) ===
No.	Title	Original release date
1	Tommy and Chantelle	2 April 2013
We meet Tommy, who thinks he can give Lewis Hamilton a run for his money and Chantelle, a prime candidate for anger management.
2	Bradley and Kayla	9 April 2013
We meet two teens who like to party - Jack-the-lad Bradley, who dreams of being a premier league footballer and Kayla, a loud and lairy daddy's girl.
3	Amy and James	16 April 2013
In this episode, we meet two teens who love life: nineteen-year-old glamour girl Amy, who hopes to be Yorkshire's answer to Katie Price, and James, an identical twin from Middlesbrough.
4	Caz and Lloyd	23 April 2013
Nineteen-year-old Caz, an Essex girl who is 'not backwards in coming forwards', and Lloyd, a 19-year-old drama student living in Cardiff are two very different teens.
5	Dean and Lauri	30 April 2013
Twenty-year-old student and party girl Lauri from Kingston-upon-Thames, hasn't driven a car since she wrote her eighteenth birthday present off, two years ago. Eighteen-year-old supermarket worker Dean from Polegate near Eastbourne has a fractious relationship with his dad, However, he doesn't do himself any favours by smoking in the car, speeding and driving dangerously in terrible weather.
6	Matthew and Georgina	7 May 2013
Matthew is a gay drama student from Wales. Having suffered homophobic abuse on public transport. With loads of diva-like screaming, running red lights and an argument with a concrete pillar, Matthew's mum is less than impressed. 18-year-old party girl Georgina from Cambridgeshire thinks nothing of going on holiday with seven boys - minus her boyfriend. But when it comes to city centre driving, she falls apart at the seams and is not helped by passengers who do their best to distract her.

=== Series 2 (2014) ===
No.	Title	Original release date
1	Jac and Hannah	12 May 2014
Hannah is a fast-talking, big-drinking, skyscraper shoe-wearing girl from Huddersfield, but beneath the fake tan and extra-long false eyelashes this 20-year-old photography student is hell-bent on success. 19-year-old Jac from Hertfordshire is poised to start a dance degree, but he has had a year off and hasn't done so much as a plié and he does like the odd bottle of pop.
2	Dominique and David	19 May 2014
Dominique is a night owl determined to live life in the fast lane. A ball of energy, the 19-year-old from Berkshire rockets between part-time jobs that fit in around her full-time devotion to parties. In east London, 18-year-old David dreams of becoming a Premier League football manager. For now, he's coaching local kids and is desperate for his own motor and independence.
3	Renaldo and Zahra	26 May 2014
Twenty-year-old Zahra from Leicester is the baby of the family and has got used to her twin sister Fahra - older by just five minutes - and her mum constantly bailing her out. Now she's preparing to move to Manchester and leave them both behind for the first time. In south London, 18-year-old Renaldo has just started his first year at uni and has thrown himself into the nightlife. But his mum Nadine raised him as a strict Christian and Skypes and phones to ensure he is getting himself to church.
4	Jessie and Jamie	2 June 2014
Seventeen-year-old fast-talking, multi-tasking Jessie is determined to carve a lucrative career, but a few months ago a broken heart nearly derailed her A Level exams. Now she needs to keep her mind off boys and on her schoolwork if she's to get the grades for university. Fun-loving 21-year-old Jamie loves a little drink and a flutter on the horses, but his mum thinks it's high time he grew up and flew the nest.
5	Luke and Chantal	9 June 2014
Eighteen-year-old Chantal from Sussex doesn't know what slow means. A talented hurdler who dreams of reaching the Olympics, she's at a crossroads - commit to rigorous training or duck out now and join her mates in living it up. Self-confessed lothario Luke from Mansfield is about to go back to uni for his second year. This term though, he's being followed by girlfriend Lauren.
6	Rob and Rebecca	16 June 2014
Twenty-year-old Rob from Hampshire loves the freedom of the open road. An adventurer by heart, he was gutted when his beloved banger was finally carted away for scrap. Up in the north east, 18-year-old Rebecca is anxiously waiting for her 'A' level results. If they are good she'll be off to uni, but that will take some adjusting for the whole family because, since she was 14, she has been her dad's main carer.

== Controversy ==
Following the broadcast of the first series, the police have begun investigating the show because of the shocking driving offences committed by teenage motorists on the programme. More than 300 viewers complained about the behaviour shown and police looked into whether the participants should be prosecuted for their bad driving. Many complained that the teenagers were rewarded with a free car despite the sloppy driving.
