= New Year's Eve (2002 film) =

- Promotional poster
- Directed by: Col Spector
- Written by: Col Spector
- Produced by: Col Spector; Radha Chakraborty
- Starring: Stephen Mangan; Keira Knightley; Philip Herbert
- Cinematography: Janet Tovey
- Edited by: Cliff West
- Release date: 18 November 2002 (UK)
- Running time: 16 minutes
- Country: United Kingdom
- Language: English

New Year's Eve is a 2002 British short romance independent film. The film was written and directed by Col Spector. New Year's Eve was later included in the 2005 compilation film Stories of Lost Souls.

== Plot ==
A young woman brings out the worst in a group of friends on New Year's Eve.

== Cast ==
- Stephen Mangan as David
- Keira Knightley as Leah
- Philip Herbert as Paul
- Bohdan Poraj as Michael
- Amit Lahav as Matt

== Reception ==
The film received mixed reviews. Angus Wolfe Murray of Eye For Film gave 4 and half out of 5 stars and said "The production values of Colin Spector's film are terrific, matched by his acerbic script and pin-sharp performances. The problem, if indeed it is a problem, remains the party itself. Sane men would certify themselves rather than stay another minute."

== Awards ==
Year	Award	Category	Recipient	Result
2003	Kinofilm Manchester Short Film Festival	Best British short	Col Spector	Won

== Notes ==
The characters of David, Matt, Michael and Paul also appeared in Spector's debut feature film Someone Else, Stephen Mangan portrayed David in both films while different actors played Matt, Michael and Paul.
