= Olobob Top =

- Genre: Children's television series
- Created by: Leigh Hodgkinson; Steve Smith
- Written by: Sam Morrison; Chris Parker; Matilda Tristram; Andrew Viner; Philip Hall; Danny Stack; Will Mabbitt
- Directed by: Steve Smith
- Creative director: Leigh Hodgkinson
- Voices of: Tom Aspinall; Elsa Hodgesmith; Sidney Hodgesmith
- Narrated by: Stephen Mangan
- Composer: David Schweitzer
- Country of origin: United Kingdom
- Original languages: English; Welsh
- No. of seasons: 2
- No. of episodes: 78

Production
- Executive producer: Jon Rennie
- Producer: Steve Smith
- Editor: Claire Underwood
- Running time: 5 minutes
- Production companies: Beakus; Cloth Cat Animation

Original release
- Network: CBeebies; S4C
- Release: 17 July 2017 – 4 September 2019

Olobob Top is a British children's television series created by Leigh Hodgkinson and Steve Smith. The programme is narrated by Stephen Mangan.

== Plot ==
The series follows a group of 3 animals called the Olobobs. Tib, Lalloo and Bobble live in a big forest and have fun playing, exploring and solving everyday problems. In each episode, with the help of Olobob Top, they work together combining shapes, colours and patterns to create a new character, who joins in with the Olobobs’ fun, while a friendly narrator encourages them to think for themselves, who suggests in each episode that it “looks like a trip to the...Olobob Top!”.

== Characters ==
- Tib (voiced by Tom Aspinall) - The oldest brother, a blue rabbit
- Lalloo (voiced by Elsa Hodgesmith) - The middle sister, an orange koala
- Bobble (voiced by Sidney Hodgesmith) - The youngest brother, a light green hamster
- Big Fish (voiced by India Newman) - A large pink-purple fish-like creature
- Crunch (voiced by Veronica Painter) - A squirrel
- Deeno (voiced by Ivar Davies-Seaton) - A green mole
- Gurdy - A large snail or beetle-like creature.
- Grown Up (voiced by Barnaby Templer) - The local adult, only his lower legs and feet are seen
- Leaves - 5 performing leaves, who are also the only characters to have no voice (excluding the one-time characters created by the Olobobs, since they only appear in one episode each).
- Lemon (voiced by Matilda Brookes) - A moose.
- Norbet (voiced by Finlay Pilfold) - A bear who is the local shopkeeper.
- Oggyboo (voiced by Jayne Sharp in "Shops", Steve Smith in "Fozzybob") - a bear.
- Fozzybob (voiced by Ottilie Barber) a small Rabbit like creature.

== Episodes ==
=== Series 1 (2017–18) ===
No.	Title	Original release date
1	"Pic Pic"	17 July 2017
When it starts to rain on their picnic the Olobobs create Elesnorter, an elephant, to blast the clouds away.
2	"Camping"	18 July 2017
Sploshy Dropper helps the Olobobs to grow some potato seeds in to an amazing popping plant!
3	"Kite Flight"	19 July 2017
Bobble gets to fly a kite at the Snoof Air Show, with the help of Loopy Longtail.
4	"Bobble Ball"	20 July 2017
The Olobobs invent a new ball game, but can't agree on the rules. When Lemon accidentally bursts the ball they make Burby, they learn that rules can be invented too!
5	"Star Catching"	21 July 2017
Bobble spots a lonely star in the sky so the Olobobs create Skyder (a spider) who carries them up to space.
6	"Bad Luck"	24 July 2017
Tib is being followed by a sad character named Bad Luck - until Gigglegoon comes along and brightens his day, and additionally renames him to "Good Luck"!
7	"Nutty Books"	25 July 2017
Crunch has started a library in her treehouse, but her books are all about nuts! The Olobobs make Book-a-Beep-Beep, who creates books from twigs - any book you can imagine.
8	"Leaf Show"	26 July 2017
When everyone joins in at the Leaf Show there's no one left in the audience, until the Olobobs create Happy Clappy. Happy Clappy isn't very happy until he gets more eyes and arms and plays the drums.
9	"Lemon Tree"	27 July 2017
The Leafs think Lemon's antlers are a great new home, until the Olobobs send them on a rocket-ride called Treewheeler.
10	"Snoof Nest"	28 July 2017
The Olobobs create Stepasnorus, who helps them return a baby Snoof to its nest.
11	"Whooshy Wotsit"	31 July 2017
When Groan Up tries on some roller skates the Olobobs have to create King Jelly to provide a soft landing.
12	"Mister Nobody"	1 August 2017
Deeno is playing tricks on people and pretending it's Mr. Nobody, until the real Mr. Nobody turns up.
13	"Plip Plup"	2 August 2017
Deeno is tired of Norbet's squeezy-box so the Olobobs create Soupy Sound, but things don't quite go to plan.
14	"Play Together"	3 August 2017
No one can agree on what to play today, so they create Sausages - a two headed sausage dog - who involves them all in a game of 'Simon Says', and everyone gets stuck in!
15	"Awards Day"	4 August 2017
At the forest Awards Day Tib and Bobble become jealous of Lalloo's prize.
16	"Hotel Bobble"	28 August 2017
Bobble's hotel for the Scuttlies (bugs) is too neat and tidy - until Scooper Dooper mashes it up!
17	"Deeno's Disco"	29 August 2017
Lalloo is the only one without a costume at the Fancy Dress Disco, until Lickety Split, a dog, comes along.
18	"Fluff"	30 August 2017
Bobble causes a flood of fluff all over the forest and the Olobobs need Squishy's help to tidy it all up.
19	"Little Choo"	31 August 2017
The Olobobs go on a forest-wide search for Bobble's favourite toy, Little Choo, a train.
20	"Sleepover"	1 September 2017
Nighttime sounds are scaring Bobble at Deeno's sleepover, until Glow Joe sheds some light on the forest.
21	"Legs"	4 September 2017
Groan Up's having a very busy party, and it's hard for the Olobobs to find their way home.
22	"Big Tidy"	5 September 2017
Gurdy is very good at tidying up - so much so that the Olobobs can't find any of their things!
23	"Happy Gurdy Day"	6 September 2017
The Olobobs invite everyone to Gurdy's 'lots-of-birthdays' birthday, with the help of beatboxing Noisy Bean!
24	"Goldy Treasure"	7 September 2017
Playing pirates is fun, especially with the help of Ladybarrd and some Goldy Glitter Fruit!
25	"Floaty Boaty"	8 September 2017
Big Fish has lost something in her pond, so the Olobobs create a submersible called Flobbledobble and take a trip beneath the water.
26	"Snowbobs"	11 December 2017
On a cold winters day the Olobobs discover all the snowclouds are sleeping, so they wake them up with the help of Ticky Tocky, an anthropomorphic big clock.
27	"Balloon"	23 April 2018
Whilst trying to retrieve a balloon, Locks-a-Lottie finds a new room in the Tree which suddenly becomes a hot air balloon!
28	"Too Long"	24 April 2018
The grass in the forest is too long to play bat-and-ball so Whiffle Whoo blows it all down in to a maze.
29	"Pilla"	25 April 2018
Pilla, a caterpillar, arrives to collect some shoes but then disappears, only to be awoken as a butterfly by Madame Flowery.
30	"Lalloo's Song"	26 April 2018
Lalloo needs Little Chirp the bird's help to remember a beautiful song she made up whilst out collecting in the forest.
31	"Crabs"	27 April 2018
Gurdy befriends some crabs at the beach, but he needs Wiggle Wag's help to reach them on their rock-home.
32	"Flying Visit"	30 April 2018
When a spaceship lands in the forest no one can talk to the visitor, until laughter is found to be a universal language.
33	"Fish Tree"	1 May 2018
With Big Fish stuck up a tree there's nothing for it but to create for her the biggest, fastest slide-and-dive ever!
34	"Pot Of What?"	2 May 2018
Trying to return a mysterious pot to its owner the Olobobs climb a rainbow and draw in the sky with magic paint!
35	"Shellbobs"	3 May 2018
Some giant purple shellbobs (snails) are brought down to size by Giddy Up and an action-packed washing-line race!
36	"Stuff"	4 May 2018
Diggy Piggy helps Deeno to find a home for all the 'stuff' he has filling up his den.
37	"Topsy Turvy"	7 May 2018
The Olobobs help a sad Topsy Turvy (a bat) to find its singing voice and turn itself upside-down - which is the right way up!
38	"Mountain"	8 May 2018
Bobble refuses to climb a mountain, until Flicky Flack helps him forget how high it is.
39	"Hiccups"	9 May 2018
When Big Fish has hiccups the Olobobs make her Prickle, who encourages her to keep calm. Error: On BBC iPlayer, when Bobble says "Prickle", the subtitles wrongly say "quicken".
40	"Fairy"	10 May 2018
When Crunch finds a new fairy friend no one else can see, the Olobobs create Hairy Fairy, who it turns out is rather bad at magic.
41	"Giant Rocks"	11 May 2018
When giant rocks appear all over the forest, Swifty Lifty (a superhero) encourages Gurdy to say hello to his visiting family!
42	"Business Trip"	23 July 2018
The Olobobs give something away at Norbet's shop - but he can't remember what it's called until a Whatyamacallit asks him just the right questions.
43	"Jumper"	24 July 2018
Tib isn't fond of his new jumper from Great Granny Olobob, but when it unravels Little Purr takes it back to Granny who knits them a special jumper big enough for all of them.
44	"Copying"	25 July 2018
Bobble won't stop playing the 'copying game' until Fobble appears and copies him, so the Olobobs make Pobble who loves being copied, which is a relief to everyone! Fobble looks like Bobble but different colours. It's possible she could be related to Bobble.
45	"Smart Thing"	26 July 2018
Norbet accidentally takes the key ingredient for the Olobob's cake whilst showing off his new Smart Thing, but Chatty Matty manages to find Norbet just in time.
46	"Ideas"	27 July 2018
Gurdy is having lots of little ideas (which are really colourful anthropomorphic flowers) who appear and run all over the Tree, so the Olobobs make Pie Piper who enchants the ideas and gives the Olobobs a yummy pie!
47	"Bus"	30 July 2018
Crunch is driving everyone around the forest in a bus, but no one can decide where to go, until the Olobobs create Dave who turns her bus in to a boat so they can visit Big Fish!
48	"Big Grump"	31 July 2018
Crunch is in a big grump because her new boots are dirty, so the Olobobs create Lady La-Dee-Dah who enjoys stomping in puddles, making everyone messy, and cheering up Crunch.
49	"Invisible"	1 August 2018
Bobble is playing at being invisible, but everyone can see him, so the Olobobs create Chamelegone who disappears before their eyes together with Bobble!
50	"Hat"	2 August 2018
Bobble's hat is too small, and gets broken when the Olobobs try and stretch it, so the Olobobs make Hatroyshka who offers him three different sized hats to try. Note: "Hatroyshka" is a pun on "matryoshka" (a Russian nesting doll).
51	"News"	3 August 2018
Norbet is creating a newspaper, but nobody's news is exciting enough until the Olobobs create Ed who reminds them they can all make exciting news with just a few sheets of paper.
52	"Cold"	19 December 2018
The Olobobs Tree is too cold so they make Fluffy who shows them that a huge hug from everyone is all their Tree needs.

=== Series 2 (2019) ===
No. overall	No. in series	Title	Original release date
53	1	"Windy Weather"	22 April 2019
The Olobobs have trouble playing outside because twigs are blowing about in the wind.
54	2	"Shops"	23 April 2019
A bear named Oggyboo opens a new shop in the Olobob Forest, upsetting Norbet who is losing customers, and making him cry.
55	3	"Opposite Day"	24 April 2019
The Olobobs are playing Opposite Day, but it confuses everyone. The moral may be that Opposite Day isn't a real day, because it is confusing.
56	4	"Queen Forest"	25 April 2019
There's someone new in the forest. But she's very bossy, and wants to rule over everyone.
57	5	"Plaster"	26 April 2019
Gurdy has hurt his leg, and is frightened to take off a plaster, in case it hurts.
58	6	"Cafe"	29 April 2019
When Deeno opens up his own cafe, he just might have bitten off more than he can chew.
59	7	"Hurry Up"	30 April 2019
Bobble is being slow in the morning and makes Lalloo and Tib late for a treasure hunt.
60	8	"Packed Lunch"	1 May 2019
Lemon wants a lunch box like everyone else, but doesn't want to eat the food inside it.
61	9	"Bigger Fish"	2 May 2019
Big Fish is angry as someone has appeared in her pond and there isn't enough room for two.
62	10	"Grannybob"	3 May 2019
When the Olobobs visit Great Granny Olobob they find Little Wolf in her place!
63	11	"Magic Words"	6 May 2019
The Olobobs are excited to try Crunch's new swing, but Bobble accidentally breaks it. Crunch cries, but after creating an anthropomorphic magic chair at the Olobob Top, Bobble learns to use his manners.
64	12	"Summer Party"	7 May 2019
The Olobobs and friends have a party, but they've forgotten bowls for their 'nice' cream.
65	13	"Postcard"	8 May 2019
When Big Fish can't go on a holibob with the Olobobs, they bring their holiday to her!
66	14	"Mini Golf"	19 August 2019
Norbet is playing crazy golf, but becomes very cross when his course is overrun with weeds. After the Olobobs create Big Bunny Boing-Boing (a big, pink rabbit) at the Olobob Top, the weeds are revealed to actually be carrots. Note: The end credits just refer to Big Bunny Boing-Boing as "Big Bunny". Because of this, it's possible that "Boing-Boing" could just be their surname.
67	15	"Bunk Beds"	20 August 2019
Bobble really wants to sleep in Tib's bed, but Tib just can't get to sleep in Bobble's.
68	16	"Socks"	21 August 2019
Bobble makes a new friend out of a turquoise sock, named Stripy. Unfortunately, Bobble is heartbroken when he finds out that Stripy belongs to Groan Up. Luckily, the Olobobs create Soctopuss, an octopus, who cheers Bobble up with a puppet show.
69	17	"Springy Thing"	22 August 2019
The Olobobs visit the Forest Clock, the oldest thing in the forest.
70	18	"Special Snoof"	23 August 2019
After hearing a beautiful song, the Olobobs discover a rare bird in the forest. But it keeps flying away.
71	19	"Home"	26 August 2019
The Olobobs and their friends take turns playing games in one another's houses. But they are sad when they find out that Gurdy’s home is his shell, because it is too small. Luckily, the Olobobs create a huge bird named Bill Quill, who collects leaves to create Gurdy a new big home.
72	20	"Funny"	27 August 2019
Norbet tries to put on a stand-up show for his friends in the Olobob Forest.
73	21	"Fozzybob"	28 August 2019
The Olobobs help Fozzybob find her way home with a special pair of glasses.
74	22	"Rubbish"	29 August 2019
Someone has dropped litter all over the Olobob Forest - can the Olobobs work out who?
75	23	"Leafs"	30 August 2019
The Leafs take refuge in the Olobobs's home, but like it so much that they won't leave.
76	24	"Museum"	2 September 2019
Crying Crunch needs the Olobobs's help to find one of the Olobob Forest Museum's rarest items.
77	25	"Moon"	3 September 2019
While the Olobobs create 'Moon-O-Matic', only Lalloo can see the moon smiling down at her.
78	26	"Dream"	4 September 2019
When Tib realises his sledging dream isn't real, Sleepyhead finds a way to help him out.
