= Never Better =

- The opening titles to Never Better.
- Genre: Sitcom
- Created by: Fintan Ryan
- Directed by: Martin Dennis
- Starring: Stephen Mangan; Kate Ashfield; Christopher Fairbank; Tom Goodman-Hill; Michele Austin
- Theme music composer: Willie Dowling
- Country of origin: United Kingdom
- Original language: English
- No. of series: 1
- No. of episodes: 6

Production
- Producer: Helen Gregory
- Running time: 30 minutes
- Production company: World Productions

Original release
- Network: BBC Two
- Release: 10 January – 14 February 2008

Never Better is a British television sitcom which started on BBC Two from 10 January to 14 February 2008. It stars Stephen Mangan as recovering alcoholic Keith Merchant and Kate Ashfield as his suffering wife Anita. The series is written by Fintan Ryan for World Productions.

The series has been described as a dark sitcom, being compared to other recent sitcoms such as Lead Balloon and Curb Your Enthusiasm. However, critics have complained that the show is too similar to others of this sort of programme, as well as attacking the character of Keith for not being funny. The series was received poorly by viewers, with the first series attracting an average audience of less than one million viewers per episode.

== Plot ==
Never Better is about Keith Merchant (Mangan), a recovering alcoholic in his mid-thirties whose life never seems to get better. His problems come from him being self-centred and preoccupied with his own flaws. He attends Alcoholics Anonymous meetings, but his behaviour often turns meetings into a farce, to the annoyance of group leader Doug (Christopher Fairbank). He has a family, with his wife Anita (Ashfield) and two children, Tom and Poppy. Whilst he attempts to be a good husband and father, his optimism for his family and attempts to do the right thing tend to lead to even more problems. Outside of AA, he has his friend Richard (Tom Goodman-Hill) for support, although Richard believes that Keith was a better friend when he was drinking.

== Production ==
The series is written by Fintan Ryan, produced by Helen Gregory and directed by Martin Dennis. The series itself is made by production company World Productions. Mangan and Ashfield had previously worked together early in their careers, providing voices for an animated series of Watership Down. Ashfield claimed that on set, she "struggled to keep a straight face most of the time." She also said that her part made her more aware of her health. She said in an interview with The Times that she hoped the show would make, "people think twice about binge drinking." When asked if the role made her more abstemious, she said, "I watch what I drink and I try to keep myself healthy."

Mangan has said that he did not attend any AA meetings as part of research saying, "I didn't feel I could sit there and pretend to be an alcoholic, I thought that would be wrong. I also didn't want to stand up and say 'Hi, my name's Stephen, I'm an actor in a sitcom.' These are places where people are trying to work out really difficult stuff. We do touch on some controversial subjects in the series; there's a lad with Down syndrome in one episode. There's all sorts of topics that you wouldn't initially think are comic issues."

== Reception ==
Never Better has been described as a dark sitcom. It has been compared to similar sitcoms such as Lead Balloon and Curb Your Enthusiasm. David Belcher in The Herald commented on the show positively writing about the lack of a laughter track and the show's making fun of controversial subjects such as Christianity.

However, people criticised Never Better for being too similar to other sitcoms and it received poor reviews overall. Paul Hoggart wrote in The Times that, "It is amiably amusing, but may suffer from comparison with last year's Outnumbered, which covered similar ground with superb dexterity." One critic from the Daily Mirror said, "Stephen Mangan's latest incarnation as recovering alcoholic Keith doesn't land with the same weight as Steve Coogan's Tommy Saxondale [from Saxondale] or Jack Dee's Rick Spleen [from Lead Balloon]."

A. A. Gill disliked the show, writing in The Sunday Times that, "Never Better (Thursday, BBC2) is so poor, so comically bereft, so rigorously scoured of charm, traction, humour or insight, that seeing that whichever sad sap wrote it couldn't be bothered to include an original syllable, neither can I. In America, the aspirational sitcom has, as is its nature, successfully progressed to become Friends and Sex and the City, Curb Your Enthusiasm, Frasier, The Larry Sanders Show. The recipe for success is simple: more of everything – more care, more commitment, more writers working harder to higher standards, with more discipline, for more money, with a collective understanding of what the genre stands for and, crucially, a belief that it has merit."

Gerard O'Donovan in the Daily Telegraph also attacked the programme. After the second episode had been broadcast, he wrote that, "Sadly, what modest potential the show evinced last week had evaporated in the interim. Recovering alcoholic Keith was again suffering from acute vagueness. Which was fine. But he also seemed to have lost his few remaining booze-free brain cells because he kept getting into scrapes as a result of not being able to use a mobile phone properly. If he'd been Victor Meldrew [from One Foot in the Grave], or a man of that generation, this might have been just about credible. But for an educated man in his thirties it was risible and came across as contrived beyond belief. A paper-thin character to begin with, with no job, no friends and no real personality to speak of, Keith was now entirely transparent, revealed as a mere vehicle for lazy situation comedy. Not even Mangan could rescue that."

The series attracted poor ratings. The third episode, broadcast on 24 January 2008, received 900,000 viewers, the lowest of the five main terrestrial channels that day. The following two episodes broadcast on 31 January and 7 February received 800,000 viewers (4% of the audience). The final episode had 823,000 viewers. This resulted in the series attracting an average audience of 935,000. In comparison, Little Miss Jocelyn, the programme that was broadcast immediately before Never Better over the same six weeks on BBC Two, attracted an average of 1.1 million viewers.

== Episodes ==
The first series started on 10 January 2008 on BBC Two, as part of the channel's "Thursdays are Funny" line-up. The episodes are scheduled to be broadcast on Thursday nights at 22:00.

#	Name	Airdate	Overview
1	"Bully"	10 January 2008	Keith is worried that Tom is being bullied at school. In order to attempt to make himself and Tom look more aggressive, he buys a 4x4 from Shaun (Neil Fitzmaurice), a fellow AA member, and uses it to stand up to the bully's mother. Keith tells Anita that he is taking the car for a test drive, but Anita demands he returns it. Keith later learns that his overheard comments about one of Tom's overweight friends have led to another boy being bullied. Shaun later tells Keith that he is likely to be laid off, because his workmates bully him. Keith advises him to stand up for himself, but this leads him to relapse into drinking. On the way back from AA, Shaun vomits in the car, meaning he cannot return it.
2	"Life and Soul"	17 January 2008	Keith is worried about both his masculinity during Tom's football practice. He also worries about some not getting his iron back after it is lent to some dinner party guests. He tries to get the iron back by stealing the guest's phone number from Anita's mobile, but she stops him. At AA, he befriends a member who finds it hard to socialise. Keith's friend Richard convinces him to become more masculine by sending each other rude text messages. However, Keith accidentally sends one text to everyone in his address book.
3	"God"	24 January 2008	Keith has problems at AA with Marianne (Susan Earl), a Christian woman who talks to her cat, Chairman Meow. He is also not wanting to go to a recorder performance given by Anita's nephew Paul, partly because he has Down's Syndrome, but mainly because Paul gropes him. At AA, he is encouraged to help someone, and is asked to take Chairman Meow to the vet. However, they learn that he possibly has cancer. After taking Paul out, his parents eventually think he is having a loving relationship with someone. Marianne then loses her faith, begins drinking and asks Keith to have sex with her. Luckily, Chairman Meow only has a furball and Marianne regains her faith.
4	"Good Samaritan"	31 January 2008	Keith is told off by Doug for holding a side-conversation despite the fact he was trying to help someone. Carl (Phillip Wright), a new member of group arrives after Doug spots signs of his alcoholism. He and Anita hold a surprise birthy party for Anita's father, and give him a plasma screen TV as a gift. However, Anita's brother Rob, a drug addict, has yet to pay his share for it. During an argument, Rob throws a ball which Keith fails to catch, resulting in the TV being broken. An intervention is organised to help Rob, but eventually he breaks down over the broken TV. At AA, Carl leaves the group but Keith welcomes him back in. Carl offers Keith a new TV for £600, which he pays for. It is later discovered that he was a conman, with everyone at the meeting giving him money for faulty electrical goods.
5	"First Week Euphoria"	7 February 2008	Keith using his AA meetings as an excuse for not seeing the grandparents. During the meeting, he pretends to yawn to indicate he thinks it is getting boring, but causes offence. A new AA member, Charlie (Nicholas Burns), is in the middle of "First week euphoria" of not drinking. It is then recommended that Keith sits in "The chair", talking to the whole group. Richard says he should talk about using the AA meetings to get away from his family. Keith does this, but everyone is shocked by him. Worried he is not helping anyone, he tries to help Charlie, but he causes more offence and ends up destroying Charlie's "First week euphoria", resulting in him wanting to get drunk. He runs across the road to do so, but is run over and dies. When Keith visits the dead body, he spills coffee over the corpse. Keith swaps his clothes over with Charlie's, but he still causes trouble at the funeral when his mobile phone rings during the service.
6	"Dad"	14 February 2008	Although at AA he annoys his fellow members by telling a trivial story, Keith tries to befriend a fellow member, Arturo (Matthew Ashforde), whose father got shot. When he is out with his family, Keith is annoyed when his father remembers a story incorrectly about getting a model plane. Keith also worries about some kids hanging around outside his house, who later jeer Anita. She tells Keith to concentrate more on his children than his father. At AA, Keith learns that Arturo's father got shot during a bank robbery and how his father being in jail resulted in a lack of a bond between them, thus inspiring to be a better father. The following meeting, he learns that Arturo and his father have been arrested for robbery. Keith finally confronts the kids outside and ends up being stabbed. In hospital, Richard tells Keith that standing up to the kids is an important step towards his alcoholic recovery.

== Adaptations ==
An American TV adaptation of Never Better was planned to be made for ABC. Damon Wayans was set to play the lead role, with Marc Buckland directing. The series is to be written by Dave Walpert, with Warren Littlefield, John Heyman and Don Reo acting as executive producers.
