= Is It Just Me or Is Everything Shit? =

2005 book by Steve Lowe and Alan McArthur

Is It Just Me or Is Everything Shit?: The Encyclopedia of Modern Life
- Author: Steve Lowe and Alan McArthur
- Language: English
- Genre: Humour
- Publisher: Little, Brown and Company
- Publication date: 3 November 2005
- Publication place: Britain
- ISBN: 0-316-72953-1
- OCLC: 61440657
- Followed by: Is It Just Me or Is Everything Shit?: Volume Two

Is It Just Me or Is Everything Shit?: The Encyclopedia of Modern Life is a book by Steve Lowe and Alan McArthur. It was published in Britain in 2005. The authors give satirical criticisms of people, places, institutions and phenomena seen in modern British life. Subjects include Live 8, 50 Cent, Chris Martin, Philip Green and The Daily Mail. The jacket copy describes the book as a "broadside against consumer capitalism," and this is a recurring theme throughout. The book displays a broadly left-wing view of life.

The book was also made available as an audio CD read by Julian Rhind-Tutt and Stephen Mangan.

== Volume Two ==
Is It Just Me or Is Everything Shit?: Volume 2
- Author: Steve Lowe; Alan McArthur
- Language: English
- Genre: Humour
- Publisher: Little, Brown and Company
- Publication date: 2 November 2006
- Publication place: Britain
- ISBN: 0-316-02996-3
- OCLC: 70764580
- Preceded by: Is It Just Me or Is Everything Shit?

In November 2006, Is It Just Me Or Is Everything Shit?: Volume Two was released as a sequel, with the same authors turning their attentions to Lemsip medicine and Bratz dolls amongst other subjects. The book features the tagline "Because if anything, it all just keeps getting worse". It covers much the same territory as the other volume, presenting a sarcastic, grumbling view of modern consumerism, politics and popular culture. Other subjects include David Cameron, James Blunt and ready meals.
