= Cackle-bladder =

Container of fake blood

A cackle-bladder or cackle bladder is a rubber bladder filled with fake blood, used to fake a person's death. Its name is derived from the fact that traditionally chicken blood was used.

Cackle-bladders are used particularly in confidence tricks and espionage. As part of a con, a cackle-bladder can be used to fool the mark (victim) into believing that one of the con artists has been killed in order to avoid them seeking retribution. In espionage, a cackle-bladder can be used as a basis for blackmail. This method has been popularised through the BBC television series Hustle. It was a device used in the climax of the 1973 film The Sting.
