= Fintan Ryan =

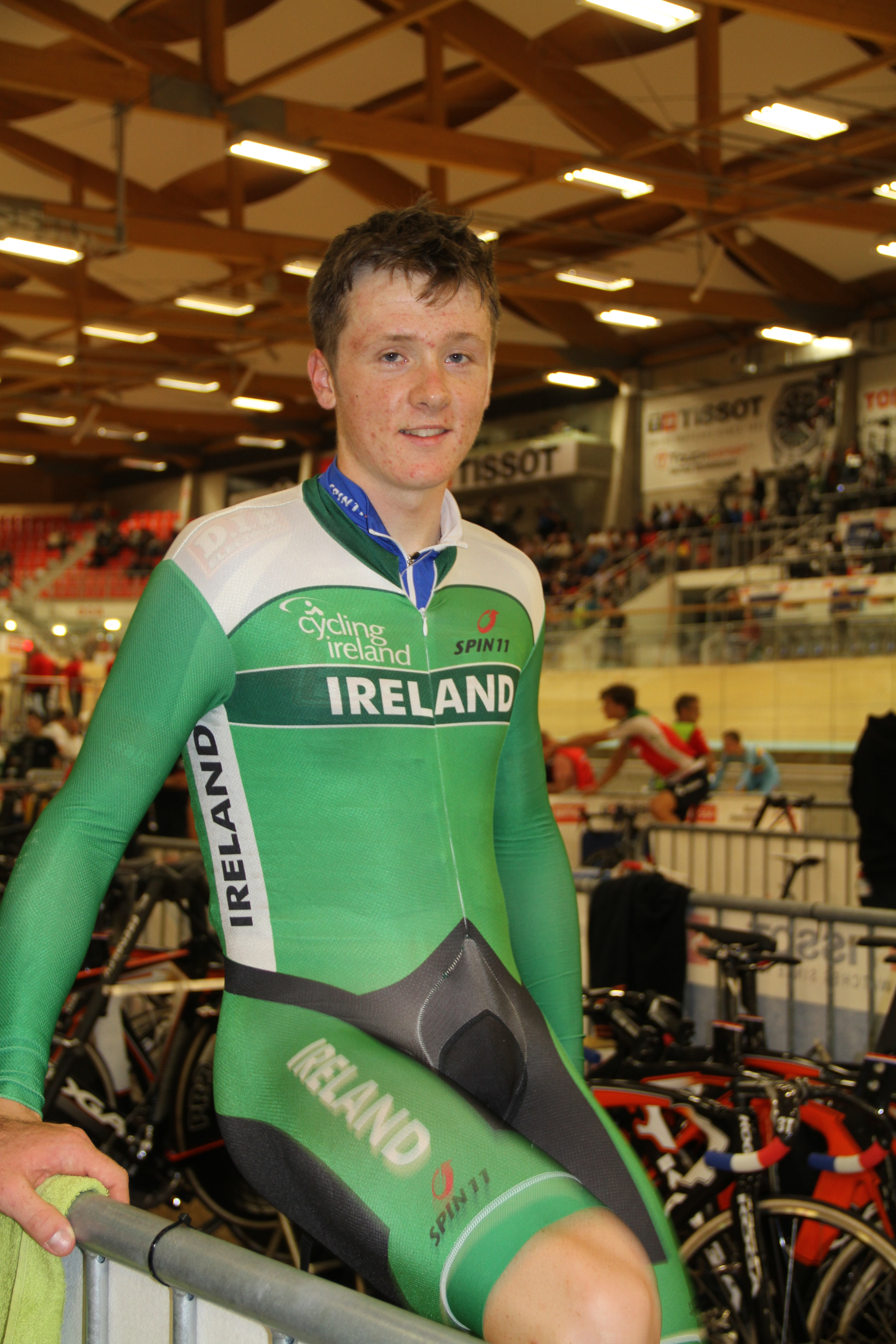
Fintan Ryan in 2015

Fintan Ryan is an Irish comedy screenwriter, best known for writing the BBC Two sitcom Never Better and the E4 science fiction series The Aliens.
