= Iceland Foods: Life in the Freezer Cabinet =

- Genre: Factual
- Directed by: James Rogan; Max Shapira
- Starring: Malcolm Walker
- Narrated by: Ashley Jensen
- Composer: Mat Davidson
- Country of origin: United Kingdom
- Original language: English
- No. of series: 1
- No. of episodes: 3 (list of episodes)

Production
- Executive producers: Lucy Hillman; Samantha Anstiss
- Producers: Alisa Pomeroy; Max Shapira
- Running time: 60 minutes
- Production company: Films of Record

Original release
- Network: BBC Two; BBC Two HD
- Release: 21 October – 4 November 2013

Iceland Foods: Life in the Freezer Cabinet is a British documentary television series about the Iceland supermarket chain that was first broadcast on BBC Two on 21 October 2013. The three-part series was co-produced with the Open University.

== Production ==
On 6 June 2013 Janice Hadlow, controller of BBC Two, announced the series along with several other documentaries. Filming took place for around a year and includes the supermarket's reaction to the 2013 meat adulteration scandal.

Lucy Hillman, an executive producer for the series, said:

Films of Record has a strong reputation for obtaining exclusive access to the subjects of its documentaries, and after 30 years in the business the company is trusted more than ever with unlimited access to organisations to portray them responsibly.

== Episode list ==
| No. | Title | Directed by | Original release date | UK viewers (millions) |
|---|---|---|---|---|
| 1 | "Episode 1" | James Rogan | 21 October 2013 | 2.43 |
Malcolm Walker, the CEO of Iceland, shows the importance of a happy workforce to Iceland. He delivers a £10,000 prize to the best-performing stores.
| 2 | "Episode 2" | James Rogan | 28 October 2013 | 2.34 |
Iceland deals with the 2013 meat adulteration scandal. A new store opens in Treorchy, Wales, and Alastair Crimp tries to come up with a good name for his product.
| 3 | "Episode 3" | James Rogan | 4 November 2013 | 2.39 |
Iceland embarks on 'refresh' to boost sales following a slow start to the year. The company attempts to create a new advert but are undecided which line to take. Malcolm tries to simplify the stores and a couple get married, serving an Iceland buffet.

== Reception ==
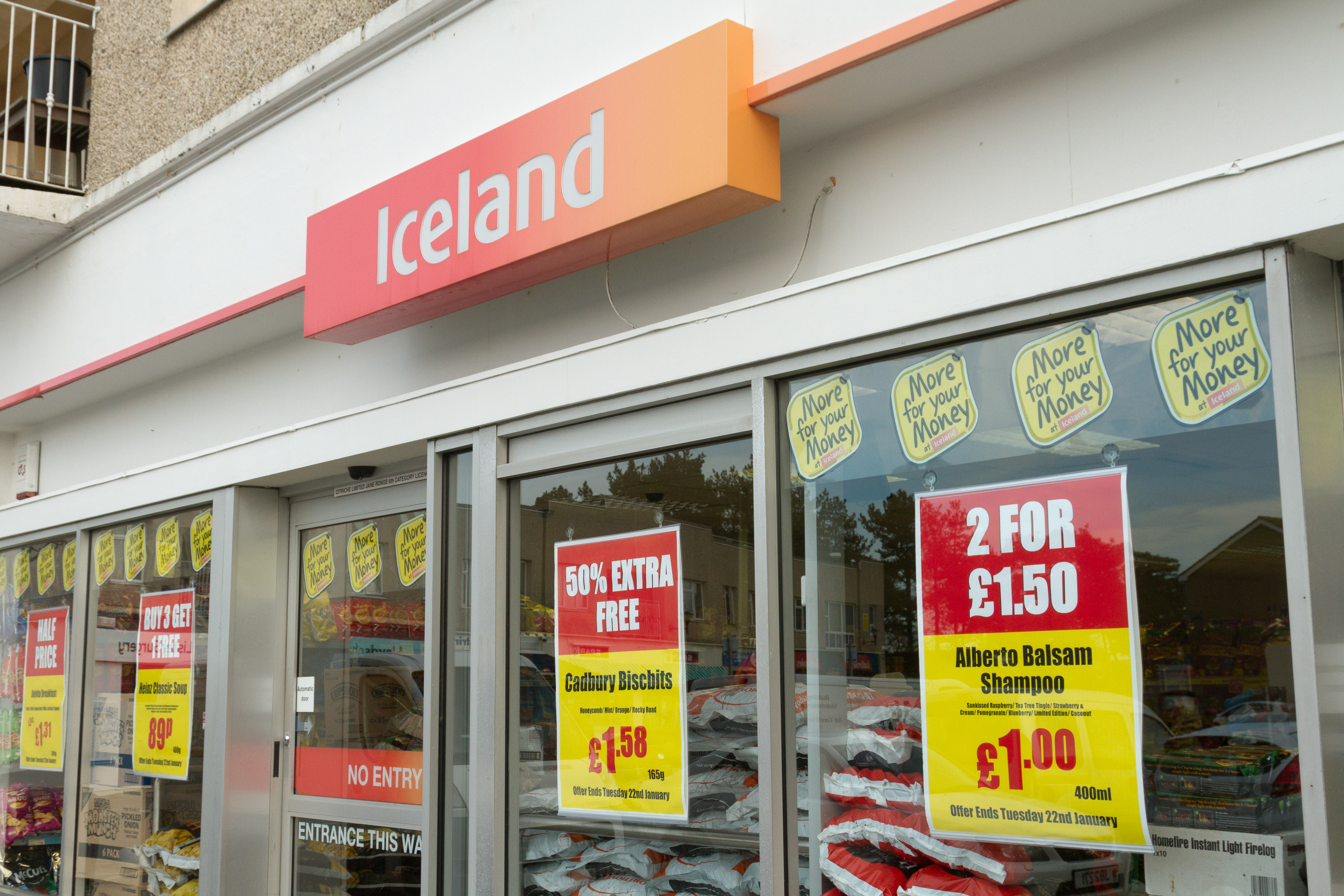
An Iceland store in Jersey

=== Ratings ===
Overnight figures show that the first episode was watched by 2.06 million viewers on BBC Two. Official ratings raised the figure to 2.43 million. It was watched by 8.7% of the television viewers during broadcast. The second and third episodes had 9.7% and 9.8% audience shares respectively.

=== Critical reception ===
Gerard Gilbert, writing for The Independent, called Malcolm Walker "a television natural." Andrew Collins of The Guardian called the series a "reasonably fair-minded, hierarchically democratic and only quasi-promotional snapshot of Iceland's working life". Time Out gave the first episode three stars out of five and said: "It’s a successful structure that creates tension and intrigue, but unless forthcoming episodes look at potentially uncomfortable issues, this is in danger of being little more than a three-hour advert."

The Metro's Keith Watson said it "would have made a fine sketch show" and also gave it three out of five stars. Sam Wollaston of The Guardian wrote in his review:

I think I'm making it – the programme – sound better than it is. This kind of docusoap about an institution – with a hint of sarcasm in the actor's narration (Ashley Jensen here) to ward off accusations that it's little more than a promotional film – feels very (at least) 10 years ago. The recent call centre one maybe just got away with it because the boss there, Nev Wilshire, was so colourful and appalling [sic]. Malcolm Walker simply doesn't have the personality to carry it. Too grey, like Alastair's prawns in bacon.

Radio Times said Walker "doesn't build himself up as a personality". Emma Willis, the head of documentary commissioning at the BBC, said this documentary was one to look out for. The Independent said there "won't have time to fully explore the relationship between food and class in the coming episodes." New Statesman contributor Rachel Cooke said she found all the "details fascinating and funny. But beyond the comedy, this series has blazed with real pathos and insight."
