= Inside Claridge's =

- Genre: Factual
- Directed by: Jane Treays
- Composer: John Lemke
- Country of origin: United Kingdom
- Original language: English
- No. of series: 1
- No. of episodes: 3 (list of episodes)

Production
- Executive producers: Magnus Temple; Emma Tutty; Clare Paterson
- Producer: Jane Treays
- Production location: London
- Running time: 60 minutes
- Production company: The Garden

Original release
- Network: BBC Two
- Release: 3 December – 17 December 2012

Inside Claridge's is a British documentary television series that first broadcast on BBC Two on 3 December 2012. The final episode aired on 17 December 2012. The series documented a year behind the scenes of Claridge's, a five-star hotel located in Mayfair, London.

== Episode list ==
No.	Title	Directed by	Original release date	UK viewers (millions)
1	"Episode 1"	Jane Treays	3 December 2012	3.09
The housekeeping staff at Claridge's prepare the whole of the third floor for foreign royalty.
2	"Episode 2"	Jane Treays	10 December 2012	4.25
The importance of tradition is explored, as well as the hotel's clientele.
3	"Episode 3"	Jane Treays	17 December 2012	4.46
Delegations arrive for the 2012 Summer Olympics held in London.

== Reception ==
=== Ratings ===
The first episode attracted 3.09 million viewers on BBC Two. It was watched by 13% of the television viewers during its original broadcast. The second episode was viewed by 4.25 million people with an audience share of 16.8%. The final episode received 4.46 million viewers and an 18.5% share of the audience. The first episode was the second most watched programme on BBC Two for that week, behind MasterChef which was watched by 3.24 million viewers. The second and final episodes were the most watched on BBC Two for their weeks. The Independent called Inside Claridge's "a soaraway ratings hit".

=== Critical reception ===
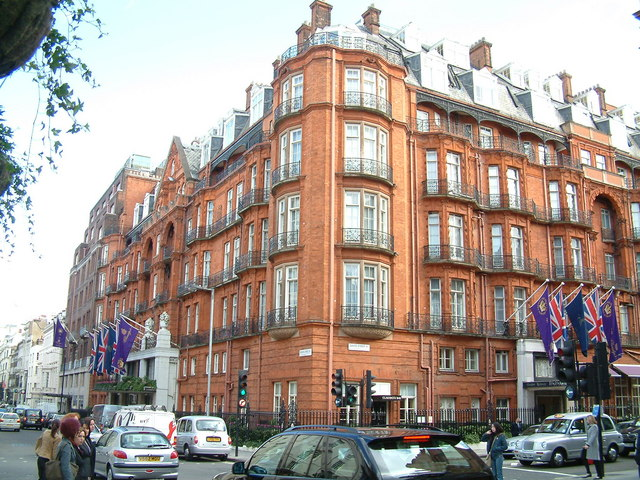
Claridge's in 2002

Inside Claridge's received positive reviews. Gerard Gilbert, a journalist writing for The Independent wrote:

ITV's 2010 documentary series about the Savoy came across as a monumental puff-piece for the refurbishment of that landmark London hostelry, but the new series about Claridge's (home from home for Tom Cruise, Madonna and various royal families) is something else entirely – by dint of it being the work of Jane Treays, a film-maker unafraid to ask a blunt question and capture a telling moment.

John Crace writing for The Guardian said:

From its opening shot of one of the staff doing the nightly clean of the 800-piece chandelier to the final credits, Inside Claridge's was an exquisite piece of documentary-making that never put a foot wrong. Director Jane Treays never actually appeared on camera, but she was a presence throughout with her off-screen questions. Unlike some documentary-makers who have the knack of putting their subjects on the defensive, she gnawed away at hers with love and was repaid time and again with delightful indiscretions, such as the correct way to address The Edge.

The Times's Alex Hardy called the documentary series "a great recruitment ad: the hotel staff seem as content as Tom Hanks's toy tester in Big." Rachel Cooke wrote in the New Statesman about her surprise by the hotel's decision to allow the BBC to film a documentary there and called the series "a little stretched" because there were not enough characters to fill up the three episodes. BBC Two controller Janice Hadlow praised the series "for not showing people's foibles in a cruel way."

After the series concluded, visits to the hotel's TripAdvisor page increased by 1769%.

=== Awards ===
Inside Claridge's was shortlisted for the Grierson Awards' British Documentary Award in 2013. It was also nominated as the best documentary series in the Broadcast Awards 2014.

=== Home media ===
The DVD edition of Inside Claridge's was released on 20 January 2014.
