= Other Dances =

Ballet choreographed by Jerome Robbins

- Choreographer: Jerome Robbins
- Music: Frédéric Chopin
- Premiere: May 9, 1976; Metropolitan Opera House
- Design: Santo Loquasto
- Created for: Natalia Makarova; Mikhail Baryshnikov

Other Dances is a ballet choreographed by Jerome Robbins to music by Frédéric Chopin. It was created on Natalia Makarova and Mikhail Baryshnikov, and premiered on May 9, 1976, at a gala benefitting the New York Public Library for the Performing Arts, held at Metropolitan Opera House. It was originally made as a pièce d'occasion, but after receiving critical acclaim, it was soon added to American Ballet Theatre and New York City Ballet's repertories.

== Production ==
Other Dances was made as a pièce d'occasion for James Lipton's "The Star Spangled Gala", which benefited the New York Public Library for the Performing Arts. Robbins had previously donated part of his profits from the musical Fiddler on the Roof to the library's dance collection. It was funded by Eugenia "Genya" Doll, the wife of Henri George Doll and former wife of choreographer Léonide Massine, as a wedding gift to dancer Natalia Makarova, with her partner in the ballet being Mikhail Baryshnikov. Both of them are Russians who had defected to the U.S. and are members of the American Ballet Theatre (ABT). Robbins had seen the two dancing with ABT and admired both of them. Doll had danced with Robbins many years earlier. It is set to Frédéric Chopin's music, including four mazurkas and one waltz, the latter previously used in Fokine's Les Sylphides. Robbins had previously used Chopin's works in The Concert, Dances at a Gathering, and its follow-up, In the Night.

Rehearsals for Other Dances began in spring 1976. At first, Robbins was concerned whether Baryshnikov, who was careful on the details, was "grasp[ing] the nuances". However, by the time the ballet was completed, he felt that "one doesn't begin to say what he can do". He was also impressed with Makarova's "ability to do the most difficult adagio dancing with exquisite control and musicality". Santo Loquasto, the costume designer, found that Robbins "was on his best behavior" due to his admiration for Baryshnikov. However, to ease the burden on the dancers and to avoid conflicts, Robbins also created some of the steps for other dancers beforehand.

Baryshnikov thought "the most difficult thing for [Robbins] was to find the form – the structure – of the ballet. He approached each section as a musical whole, and then had to work out the sequence in a way that was theatrically sound." Robbins would ask Baryshnikov to "listen to the music" and explain how he interpreted the music. He also did not use any "verbal or psychological descriptions", and used some very brief instructions. In some rehearsals, Robbins would dance Baryshnikov's part and the latter would not dance at all. However, Baryshnikov noted by seeing him dance, he understood what Robbins wanted, and brought him "closest to dancing it the way he wanted". It also helped Baryshnikov learn the ballet quicker than he expected. He called Robbins "stupendous", and the experience of working with him "was a complete revelation".

== Choreography ==
Baryshnikov wrote, "There is no idea for Other Dances, there is no story." It is 20 minutes long. While the ballet follows the structure of a classical a pas de deux, with pas de deux, two solos and a coda, Baryshnikov noted it could have worked with any order. The pianist is onstage during the ballet. When one dancer performs a solo, the other dancer is offstage rather than watching onstage. Robbins made this choice as he knew Makarova and Baryshnikov would prefer to rest offstage. After each section, the dancers bow to the audience, as Robbins thought the audience should applaud the pair.

In her memoir, Makarova wrote, "In Other Dances, the body seems to be weaving a shawl of valenciennes lace ... the hesitations, the subtle nuances, that fine understatement of movement that for me is the most precious feature of the romantic – and for that matter, of any – ballet." She added that when she and Baryshnikov dance Other Dances together, they "always try to convey a certain dramatic message to the audience".

Baryshnikov added that while the ballet is "very relaxed and harmonious", it is also "quite difficult" due to it being long for a pas de deux, and sometimes "it's harder to be relaxed onstage for that amount of time" than dancing more virtuosic steps. He also found the "calm and benign" tension "difficult to maintain". In a 2008 interview, Baryshnikov described Other Dances as "utterly Slavic" because both he and Makarova are Russians, and because of the way she moved her arms, which fascinated Robbins. He also noted the use of mazurka, stamping and arms were stem from character dancing.

== Music ==
All the music used in Other Dances are composed by Chopin, including:

- Mazurkas, Op. 17, No. 4
- Mazurkas, Op. 41, No. 3
- Waltz, Op. 64, No. 3
- Mazurkas Op. 63, No. 2
- Mazurkas, Op. 33, No. 2

== Performances ==
Other Dances premiered on May 9, 1976, at "The Star Spangled Gala" held at the Metropolitan Opera House. The same night, Robbins was presented the Handel Medallion by Mayor Abraham Beame.

Upon critical acclaim, the American Ballet Theatre, where Makarova and Baryshnikov were dancing at the time, acquired Other Dances shortly after it premiered. In November, Robbins' company, the New York City Ballet, debuted the ballet, danced by Suzanne Farrell and Peter Martins. The costumes were also designed by Loquasto, but in mauve instead of the blue in the original production.

In 2012, when Makarova received the Kennedy Center Honors, an excerpt of Other Dances was performed by Tiler Peck, a New York City Ballet principal dancer.

== Critical reception ==
On the premiere of Other Dances, New York Times critic Clive Barnes called it a "masterpiece". He compared it to Dances at a Gathering, another Robbins ballet to Chopin's music, and wrote, "it could fit into Dances at a Gathering without a shudder of notice. It has precisely the original ballet's sense of place and style, of Slavic forms growing in an alien soil, of transposed dance images, character motions and national glints, into an oddly pure form of classic dance. There is no choreography — with its mixture of character fervor and classic grace — quite like it anywhere." In 1977, reviewing ABT performing Other Dances in London, Peter Williams of Dance and Dancers commented he would be happy to "see both these dancers in this piece every night of my life".

== Videography ==
In 1980, a performance of Other Dances with Makarova and Baryshnikov was filmed and released on the PBS broadcast Dance in America.
