= Sally Emerson =

English novelist and travel writer

Sally Emerson is an English novelist, anthologist and travel writer.

== Education and career ==
Born in c.1952 Emerson was educated at Wimbledon High School and St Anne's College, Oxford, where she read English. Her father was a consultant physician and her mother had worked in Hut 6 in Bletchley Park during the Second World War.

Between school and university Emerson was editorial assistant and writer on the magazine Books and Bookmen which she went on to edit.

While at Oxford she co-edited the Isis magazine, won the Vogue Talent Contest for writing in 1972 and the Radio Times Young Journalist of the Year competition along with a Catherine Pakenham Award and wrote for The Times.

She worked on The Illustrated London News then became assistant editor of Plays and Players in 1976. From 1978 to 1985 she was editor of the literary magazine Books and Bookmen (which briefly became Book Choice then returned to the title Books and Bookmen).

In 1980 she published her first novel Second Sight. It won a Yorkshire Post Best First Novel award. In the US the title was The Second Sight of Jennifer Hamilton. Next came Listeners in 1983, the bestsellers Fire Child (1987), Separation (titled Hush Little Baby in the US) 1992 and Heat set in Washington DC in 1998. Broken Bodies came out in 2001 and her collection of short stories Perfect: Stories of the Impossible in 2022.

Her anthologies, collections of poetry and prose on birth, love and death are In Loving Memory: A Collection for Memorial Services, Funerals and Just Getting By (2004), Be Mine: An Anthology for Lovers, Weddings and Ever After (2007) and New Life, An Anthology for Parenthood (2009).

Her other non-fiction anthology titles include A Celebration of Babies (1986) and The Kingfisher Nursery Treasury (1988).

Since 2003 she has also worked as a travel writer for the Sunday Times as well as contributing to other newspapers. She has co-written the musical Prohibition (2023) and written screenplays.

Her six earlier novels were republished by Quartet Books as Rediscovered Classics in 2017, and in 2021 by Quadrant Books.

== Personal life ==
She was married to Peter Stothard from 1980 to 2021 and they have two children, the novelist Anna Stothard and Michael Stothard, and six grandchildren.

In 1981, during a separation from her husband while he was involved with someone else, she had a relationship with writer Douglas Adams; he dedicated his book Life, the Universe and Everything to her.

== Books ==
- Second Sight (1980), ISBN 0-7181-1965-7
- Listeners (1983), ISBN 0-7181-2134-1
- A Celebration of Babies: An Anthology of Poetry and Prose (ed., 1986), ISBN 0-216-91864-2
- Fire Child (1987), ISBN 0-7181-2832-X
- Separation (1992), ISBN 0-356-19587-2
- Heat (1998), ISBN 0-316-64317-3
- Broken Bodies (2001), ISBN 0-316-85483-2
- In Loving Memory: A Collection for Memorial Services, Funerals and Just Getting By (ed., 2004), ISBN 0-316-72599-4
- New Life, An Anthology for Parenthood, ISBN 978-1-4087-0112-6
- The Kingfisher Nursery Treasury, ISBN 0-86272-334-5
- Be Mine: An Anthology for Lovers, Weddings and Ever After (ed., forthcoming 2007), ISBN 0-316-73258-3
- Fire Child (2017), ISBN 0-7043-7428-5
- Heat (2017), ISBN 0-7043-7427-7
- Perfect: Stories of the Impossible (2022), ISBN 9781861519788
