= Peter Stothard =

British author, journalist and critic (born 1951)

Sir Peter Stothard FRSL
- Born: 28 February 1951 (age 75)
- Education: Brentwood School, Essex
- Alma mater: Trinity College, Oxford
- Employer(s): BBC; News UK
- Spouses: Sally Emerson (m. 1980; div. 2021) Ruth Scurr (m. 2021)
- Children: 2, including Anna

Sir Peter Stothard FRSL (born 28 February 1951) is a British author, journalist and critic. From 1992 to 2002 he was editor of The Times and from 2002 to 2016 editor of The Times Literary Supplement, the only journalist to have held both roles. He writes books about Roman history and his four books of memoir cover both political and classical themes.

== Early life ==
He was the son of Max Stothard, an electrical engineer who worked at the Marconi Research Centre, Great Baddow. He grew up on the nearby Rothmans Estate. He was educated at Brentwood School, Essex (1962–68); and Trinity College, Oxford, where he became editor of Oxford University student newspaper Cherwell.

== Career ==
Stothard joined the BBC after leaving university, and wrote for the New Statesman, New Society and Plays and Players. He joined The Sunday Times in 1978 and The Times in 1981, becoming chief leader writer, deputy editor and, based in Washington, US editor. He published Thirty Days: An Inside Account of Tony Blair at War in 2004, based on observations inside Downing Street during the Iraq War.

During a stage of Stothard's editorship, The Times reached an average sale of over 900,000 – the highest in its history. This was, in part, the result of the so-called "price war" that started in 1993 when The Times reduced its cover price and started intense circulation battles against The Daily Telegraph and The Independent.

In 1999, he became involved in a legal dispute over political funding with the Conservative Party treasurer Michael Ashcroft. Lord Ashcroft sued, but subsequently withdrew his suit after a statement agreed by both parties. Stothard was named as Editor of the Year in the same year by Granada Television's What the Papers Say.

In 2000, he was diagnosed with a rare form of cancer and was away from The Times for 10 months for successful treatment. It returned in 2012 and 2013.

Whilst editor of The Times Literary Supplement, he often wrote about Greek and Roman literature.

In 2010, his first book of memoir, On the Spartacus Road, combined an account of the Spartacus uprising with elements of autobiography. His second, Alexandria, The Last Nights of Cleopatra, extended the same form, including accounts of newspaper life alongside the story of his engagement with Greece, Rome and Egypt. Alexandria... won the 2013 Criticos Prize for literature on themes from ancient or modern Greece. The Senecans: Four Men and Margaret Thatcher, his memoir of the 1980s and '90s, was published in September 2016. The critic Stuart Kelly described Stothard as "one of the most avant-garde practitioners of the form".

He was chairman of judges for the Man Booker Prize for Fiction (2012) and president of the Classical Association. In 2017, he was appointed a trustee of the National Portrait Gallery, London. Stothard appears as a character briefly in the first scene of a one-level Tomb Raider expansion videogame made by Core Design in association with The Times. The expansion is called Times Exclusive Level and was released in 2000.

His 2025 book Horace: Poet on a Volcano was shortlisted for the James Tait Black Memorial Prize for biography in 2026.

== Personal life ==
Stothard is married to the biographer and critic Ruth Scurr. He has a son, Michael (born 1987), and a daughter, the novelist Anna Stothard (born 1983) from his marriage to novelist Sally Emerson (1980–2021), and six grandchildren from that marriage.

== Honours ==
He was knighted for services to the newspaper industry in 2003.

In 2013, he was awarded the President's Medal by the British Academy and he was elected a Fellow of the Royal Society of Literature in 2023.

== Bibliography ==
- Thirty Days: An Inside Account of Tony Blair at War (2004), ISBN 978-0-06-058262-3
- On the Spartacus Road: A Spectacular Journey Through Ancient Italy (2010), ISBN 978-0-00-734078-1
- Alexandria: The Last Night of Cleopatra (2013), ISBN 978-1-4683-0370-4
- The Senecans: Four Men and Margaret Thatcher (2016), ISBN 978-1-4683-1342-0
- The Last Assassin: The Hunt for the Killers of Julius Caesar (2020), ISBN 978-0-19-752335-3
- Crassus: The First Tycoon (2022), ISBN 978-0-30-025660-4
- Palatine: An Alternative History of the Caesars (2023) ISBN 978-1-47-462099-4
- Horace: Poet on a Volcano (2025) ISBN 9780300256581

=== Book reviews ===
Date	Review article	Work(s) reviewed
2011	"The old BC/AD, BCE/CE : errors abound in Robert Hughes' history of Rome". Australian Book Review. 334: 8–9. September 2011.	Hughes, Robert (2011). Rome: A Cultural, Visual and Personal History. Weidenfeld & Nicolson. ISBN 978-0-297-84464-8.
2014	"All the roads to Waterloo". The Times Literary Supplement. November 2014.	Uglow, Jenny (2014). In These Times : Living in Britain through Napoleon's wars, 1793–1815. Faber. ISBN 978-0-571-26952-5.
2015	"The Ancient Art of Fooling Voters". The Wall Street Journal. March 2012.	Cicero, Quintus Tullius (2015). How to Win an Election. Princeton University Press. ISBN 978-0-691-15408-4.
2015	"How the Romans went about their business". Spectator. April 2015.	Koloski-Ostrow, Ann Olga (2015). The Archaeology of Sanitation in Roman Italy : Toilets, Sewers, and Water Systems. University of North Carolina Press. ISBN 978-1-4696-2128-9.
2015	"Cities on the bay". The Times Literary Supplement. May 2015.	Hughes, Jessica (2015). Remembering Parthenope. Oxford University Press. ISBN 978-0-19-967393-3.
2015	"Antonia Fraser's summer afternoons". The Times Literary Supplement. July 2015.	Fraser, Antonia (2015). My History. Weidenfeld & Nicolson. ISBN 978-0-297-87190-3.
2015	"Margaret Thatcher and the Britain she left behind". The Times Literary Supplement. November 2015.	Moore, Charles (2011). Margaret Thatcher. Allen Lane. ISBN 978-0-7139-9288-5.

Media offices
Preceded by Charles Wilson	Deputy Editor of The Times; 1986–1992	Succeeded by John Bryant
Preceded by Simon Jenkins	Editor of The Times; 1992–2002	Succeeded by Robert Thomson
