= Qian Jianan =

Chinese writer

Qian Jianan (Chinese: 钱佳楠; pinyin: Qián Jiānán) is a member of Shanghai Writers Association. Her works won the thirty-fourth session of Taiwan's "Times Literary Award" short story Jury Award and were twice nominated for literary prize Lin Yu Tang final review. Her translation of the novel "Pink Hotel" ([English] Anna Stothard, Sichuan Literature and Art Publishing House) appears more commonly in the works of "Shanghai Literature" "Fu Rong" "Mengya" "Li" and other publications.

== Biography ==
Qian Jianan was born in Shanghai in the late 1980s. She graduated from Department of Chinese Studies of Fudan University. She is currently doing an MFA degree in Iowa Writers' Workshop.

== Books ==
- Release 《人只会老，不会死》。 (Rén zhǐ huì lǎo, bù huì sǐ)
