= Starkenburg Observatory =

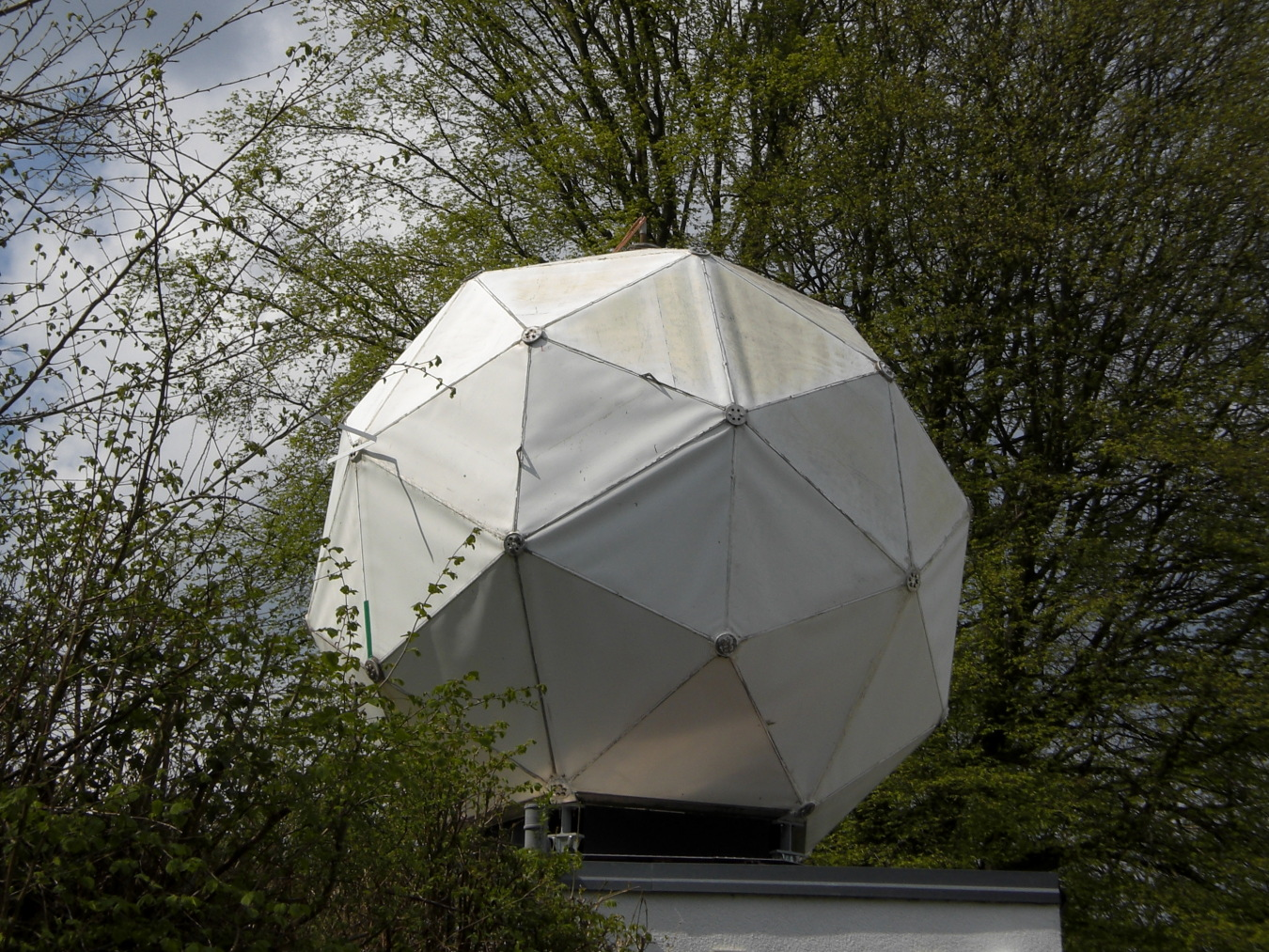
- Named after: Starkenburg
- Observatory code: 611
- Location: Starkenburg, Germany
- Coordinates: 49°38′49″N 8°39′07″E
- Established: 1970
- Related media on Commons

Minor planets discovered: 52
see § List of discovered minor planets

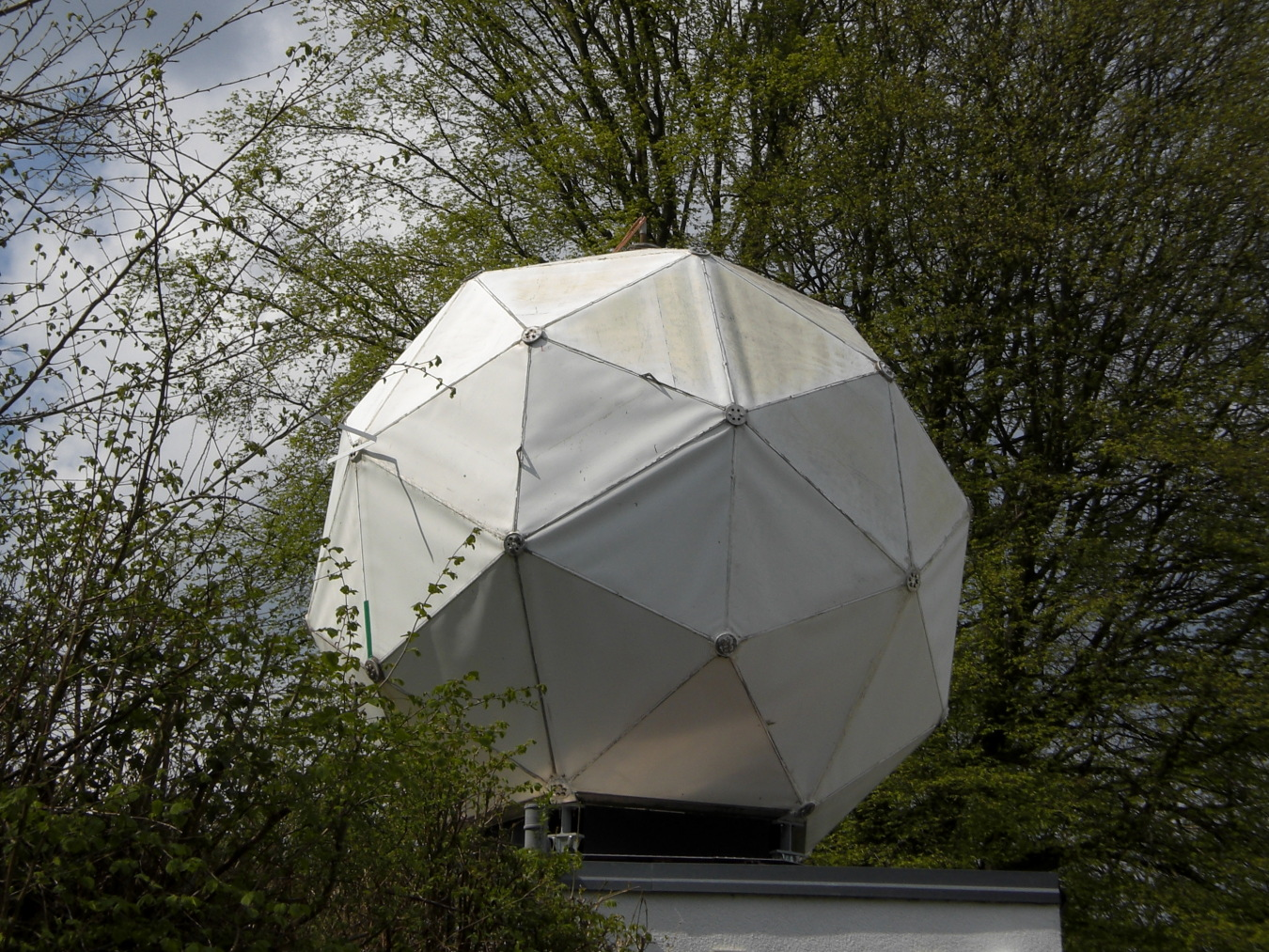
Part of the Starkenburg Observatory

The Starkenburg Observatory (German: Starkenburg-Sternwarte) is an astronomical observatory in Heppenheim, Germany. It was founded in 1970, and currently has about 150 members.

The observatory was the venue for the 1997 and 2003 meetings of the European Radio Astronomy Congress. The amateur astronomers at the observatory have discovered more than 40 asteroids and participate in the tracking of near earth asteroids.

The instruments at the observatory consists of:

- 0.45-meter newtonian
- 0.356-meter Schmidt–Cassegrain telescope
- 0.30-meter newtonian
- 0.20-meter refractor
- 0.15-meter refractor
- 0.10-meter refractor
- 0.19-meter flat-field camera
- 0.14-meter Schmidt camera

The two main-belt asteroids 6864 Starkenburg and 14080 Heppenheim were named in honor of the medieval castle, the adjunct observatory and the nearby town Heppenheim, respectively.

== List of discovered minor planets ==
As of 2016, IAU's Minor Planet Center (MPC) credits the discovery of 52 numbered minor planets directly to the observatory (group discovery) including 47 discoveries to "Starkenburg" (1997–2009), and 5 discoveries to "Heppenheim" (1997–2002), for which no apparent distinction can be made.

12053 Turtlestar	9 August 1997	list^{[A]}
12057 Alfredsturm	18 February 1998	list^{[A]}
14080 Heppenheim	1 April 1997	list^{[A]}
15397 Ksoari	27 October 1997	list^{[A]}
16809 Galápagos	21 October 1997	list^{[A]}
16969 Helamuda	29 October 1998	list^{[A]}
17855 Geffert	19 May 1998	list^{[A]}
18567 Segenthau	27 September 1997	list^{[A]}
18610 Arthurdent	7 February 1998	list^{[A]}
18653 Christagünt	28 March 1998	list^{[A]}
(18893) 2000 GH_{1}	2 April 2000	list^{[A]}
21663 Banat	3 September 1999	list^{[A]}
24168 Hexlein	29 November 1999	list^{[A]}
27984 Herminefranz	1 November 1997	list^{[A]}
31984 Unger	25 April 2000	list^{[A]}
33863 Elfriederwin	5 May 2000	list^{[A]}
35357 Haraldlesch	28 September 1997	list^{[B]}
38270 Wettzell	11 September 1999	list^{[B]}
(38681) 2000 QK_{6}	24 August 2000	list^{[A]}
40764 Gerhardiser	13 October 1999	list^{[B]}

(40995) 1999 UC_{4}	27 October 1999	list^{[A]}
(47083) 1998 YG_{22}	29 December 1998	list^{[A]}
56561 Jaimenomen	5 May 2000	list^{[A]}
58896 Schlosser	15 May 1998	list^{[B]}
60006 Holgermandel	13 October 1999	list^{[A]}
(60175) 1999 VQ_{1}	3 November 1999	list^{[A]}
(66480) 1999 RW_{33}	10 September 1999	list^{[A]}
(68980) 2002 RP_{181}	13 September 2002	list^{[A]}
(72057) 2000 YS_{9}	23 December 2000	list^{[A]}
(89263) 2001 VZ_{1}	10 November 2001	list^{[A]}
(89455) 2001 XJ_{1}	8 December 2001	list^{[A]}
(105250) 2000 QJ_{6}	24 August 2000	list^{[A]}
121232 Zerin	11 September 1999	list^{[A]}
(137466) 1999 UB_{4}	27 October 1999	list^{[A]}
(157894) 1999 TK_{16}	14 October 1999	list^{[A]}
(178543) 1999 VP_{1}	3 November 1999	list^{[A]}
(190415) 1999 UP_{1}	17 October 1999	list^{[A]}
(193493) 2000 YZ_{7}	21 December 2000	list^{[A]}
(208034) 1999 RT_{28}	8 September 1999	list^{[A]}
216624 Kaufer	9 December 2002	list^{[B]}

(219657) 2001 VA_{2}	10 November 2001	list^{[A]}
(321286) 2009 FL_{14}	19 March 2009	list^{[A]}
(321311) 2009 HX_{35}	19 April 2009	list^{[A]}
(322003) 2010 UE_{82}	3 November 1999	list^{[A]}
(337298) 2000 YY_{7}	22 December 2000	list^{[A]}
342431 Hilo	25 October 2008	list^{[A]}
(343080) 2009 DH_{1}	17 February 2009	list^{[A]}
(349826) 2009 CU_{6}	14 February 2009	list^{[A]}
(367468) 2009 DG_{1}	17 February 2009	list^{[A]}
(403307) 2009 CR_{6}	14 February 2009	list^{[A]}
(435943) 2009 CE_{40}	14 February 2009	list^{[A]}
(457708) 2009 FO_{14}	20 March 2009	list^{[A]}
The MPC credits discovery to:^{A} Starkenburg^{B} Heppenheim

For the table below, the mentioned astronomers may or may not be credited directly with the discovery by the MPC. Instead, the discovery site/observatory, "Starkenburg" or "Heppenheim", may be the sole credited discoverer, as for 18610 Arthurdent (discovered at Heppenheim by Starkenburg).

Asteroids discovered: 52 (47+5)
12053 Turtlestar	October 8, 1997	M. Busch, W. Ernst, K. Sonneberg, L. Kurtze
12057 Alfredsturm	February 18, 1998	P. Geffert, J. Rothermel, E. Schwab, R. Stoss
14080 Heppenheim	April 1, 1997	W. Ernst, K. Sonneberg, R. Stoss
15397 Ksoari	October 27, 1997	M. Busch, W. Ernst, K. Sonneberg, L. Kurtze
16809 Galápagos	October 21, 1997	M. Busch, L. Kurtze
16969 Helamuda	October 29, 1998	M. Busch, P. Geffert, R. Stoss
17855 Geffert	May 19, 1998	A. Busch, M. Busch, E. Schwab
18567 Segenthau	September 27, 1997	R. Stoss
18610 Arthurdent	February 7, 1998	F. Hormuth
18653 Christagünt	March 28, 1998	F. Hormuth, J. Rothermel, R. Stoss
21663 Banat	September 3, 1999	M. Busch, R. Stoss
24168 Hexlein	November 29, 1999	M. Busch, R. Stoss, R. Kresken
27984 Herminefranz	November 1, 1997	R. Stoss
33863 Elfriederwin	May 5, 2000	E. Schwab, R. Stoss
56561 Jaimenomen	May 5, 2000	R. Stoss, E. Schwab

== See also ==
- List of astronomical observatories
- Sankt Andreasberg Observatory
- Sonneberg Observatory
- Stuttgart Observatory
