= Sankt Andreasberg Observatory =

Observatory Sankt Andreasberg
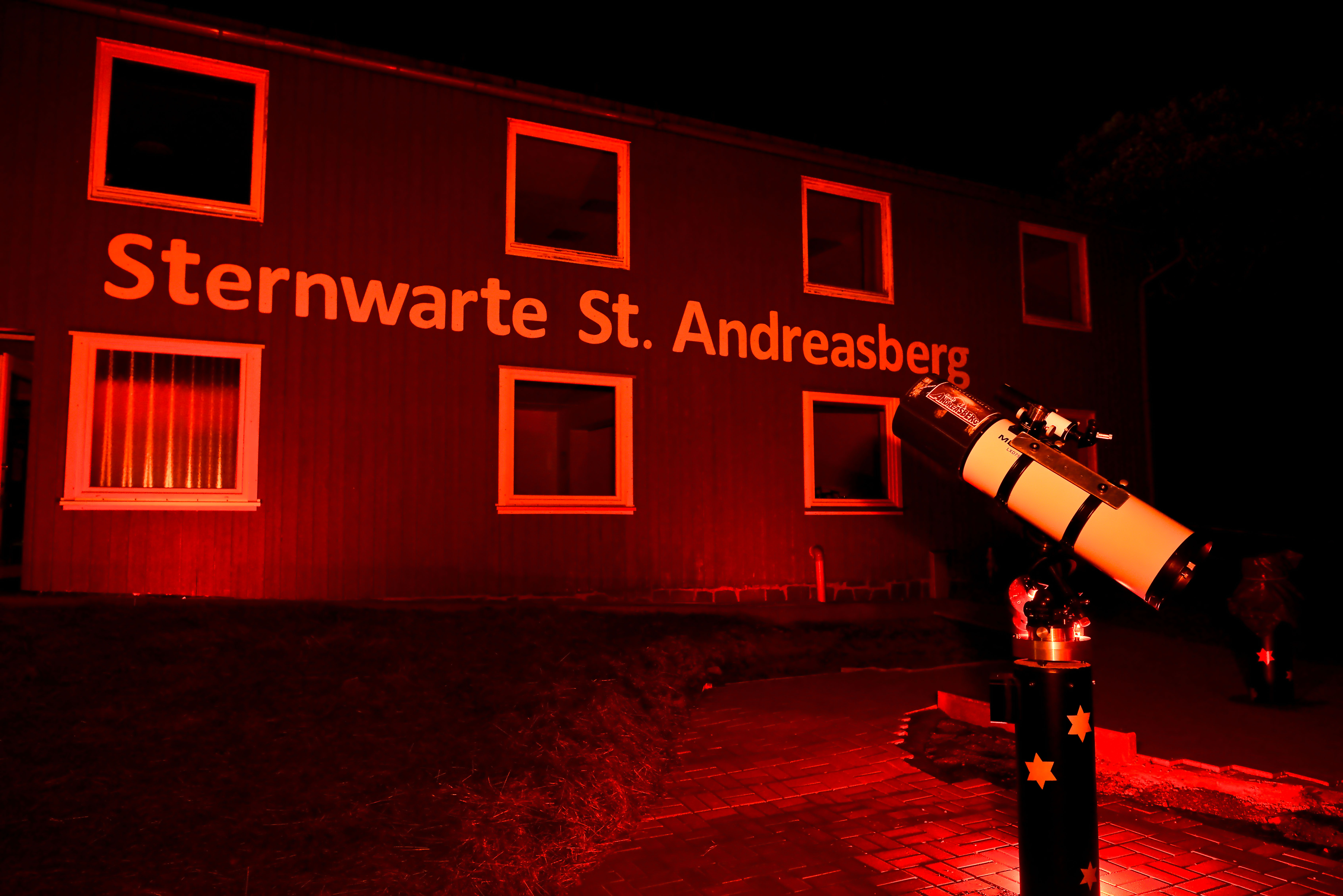
- Alternative names: Harz Observatory
- Named after: Sankt Andreasberg
- Location: Sankt Andreasberg, Braunlage, Goslar, Lower Saxony, Germany
- Coordinates: 51°43′55″N 10°31′34″E
- Altitude: 710 m (2,330 ft)
- Website: www.sternwarte-sankt-andreasberg.de
- Related media on Commons

The Sankt Andreasberg Observatory, also called Harz Observatory, is a project of the charitable society Sternwarte Sankt Andreasberg e. V., which translates into Sankt Andreasberg Observatory registered society. It was opened in August 2014 and aims to be the first fully barrier free Observatory in Germany. The society's stated goal is to make the sky accessible to all people, whether they are disabled or not. Celestial observation, lectures and Workshops convey general astronomical knowledge to visitors.

== Location ==
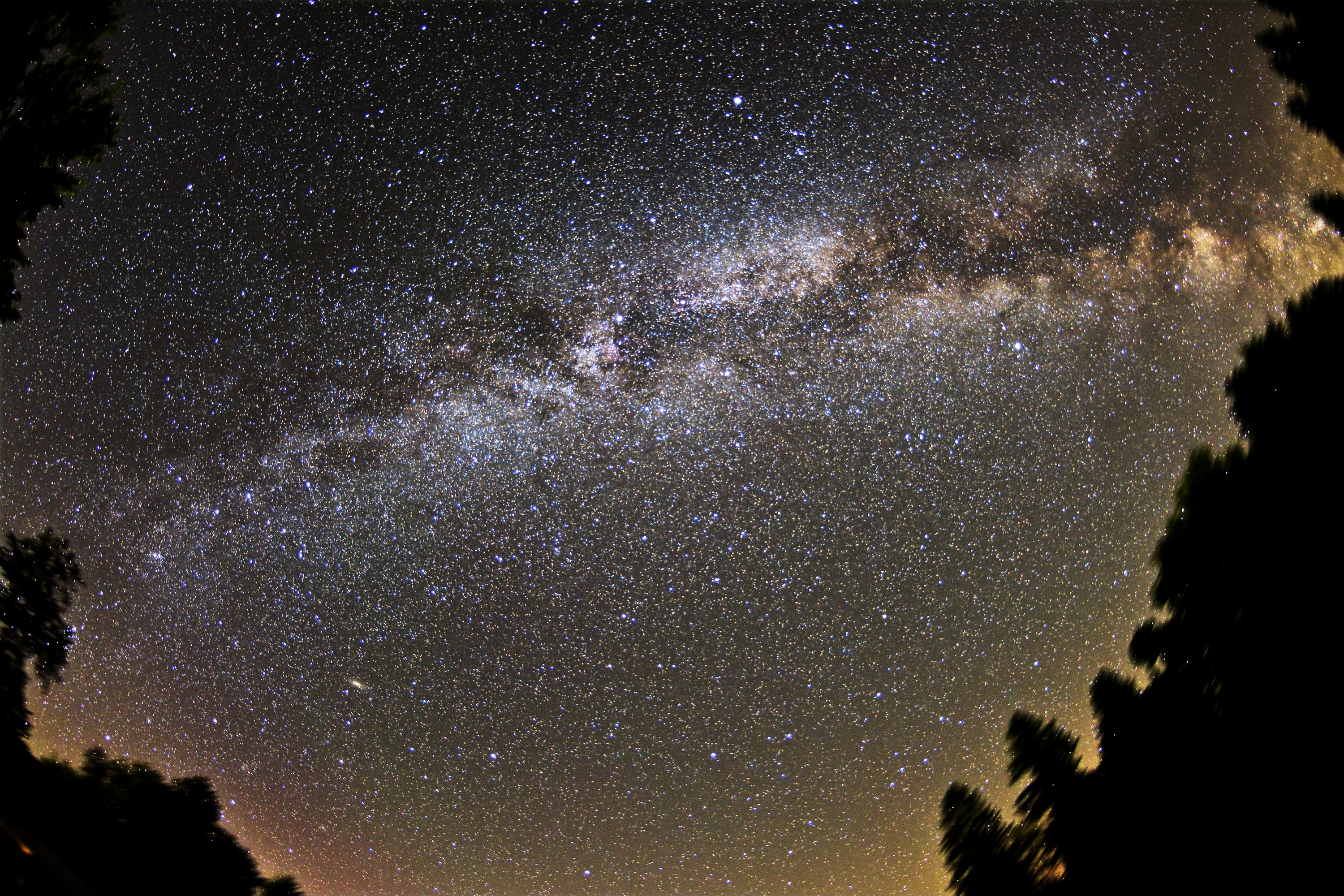
Nearly natural view of the Milky Way

The Sankt Andreasberg Observatory is located near the Rehberg on the premises of the Internationale Haus Sonnenberg, an international educational facility. It is one of the most elevated observatories in northern Germany. The air at an altitude of 710 metres is low in turbidity and since the Harz Nature Park is far away from big cities, there is far less light pollution than in other parts of northern Germany. According to the Federal Agency for Nature Conservation, Sankt Andreasberg is one of the six best locations for astronomy in Germany. In April 2011 the Sky Quality Meter measured 21,81 mag/arcsec².

== History ==
The Sankt Andreasberg Observatory Society was founded in 2008, aiming at building and operating an observatory for all people. At first, they wanted to build it from scratch on the Jordanshöhe. However, due to environmental protection constraints, it was decided in July 2013 to rent a building of the Internationale Haus Sonnenberg, about 1 km north of the originally designated site, and to repurpose it as an observatory. The constructions in and around the building were mostly financed by donations. The observatory was opened on August 22, 2014. The eastern front of the building is supposed to be extended by an observation dome.

== Equipment ==
The outdoor area includes five telescope mounts of different heights, featuring power outlets and data transmission facilities. The association owns several telescopes to be used by guests. A 120 cm reflecting telescope is currently being assembled. Another reflecting telescope, featuring a primary mirror of 400 mm diameter (16″ f/8 Hypergraph) and a computer aided mount of type Knopf MK70S were first used during the STATT 2015 (August 13–16, 2015). The reflecting telescope can be used visually as well as photographically.

== Universal design ==
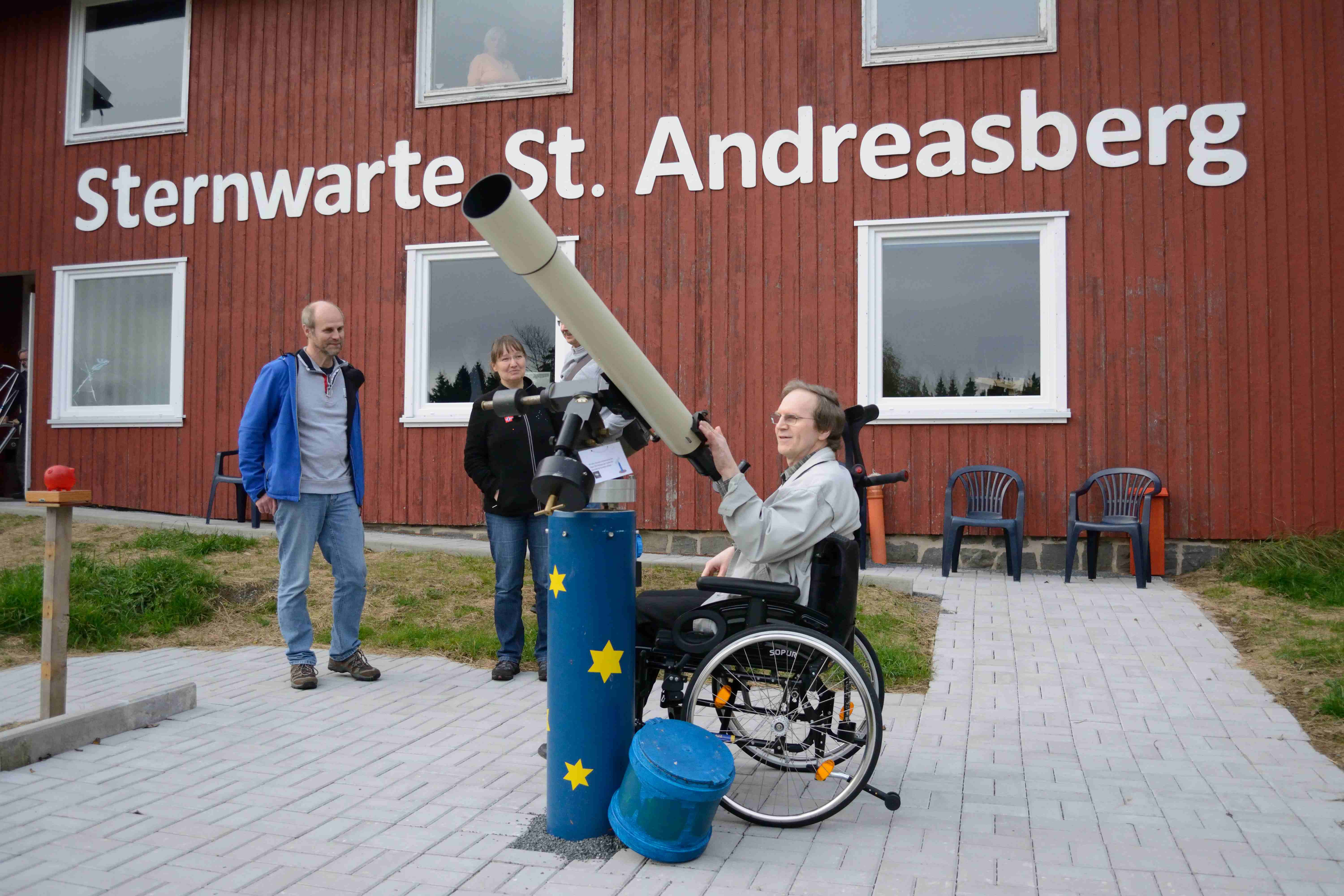
Wheelchair Accessible Telescope Mount

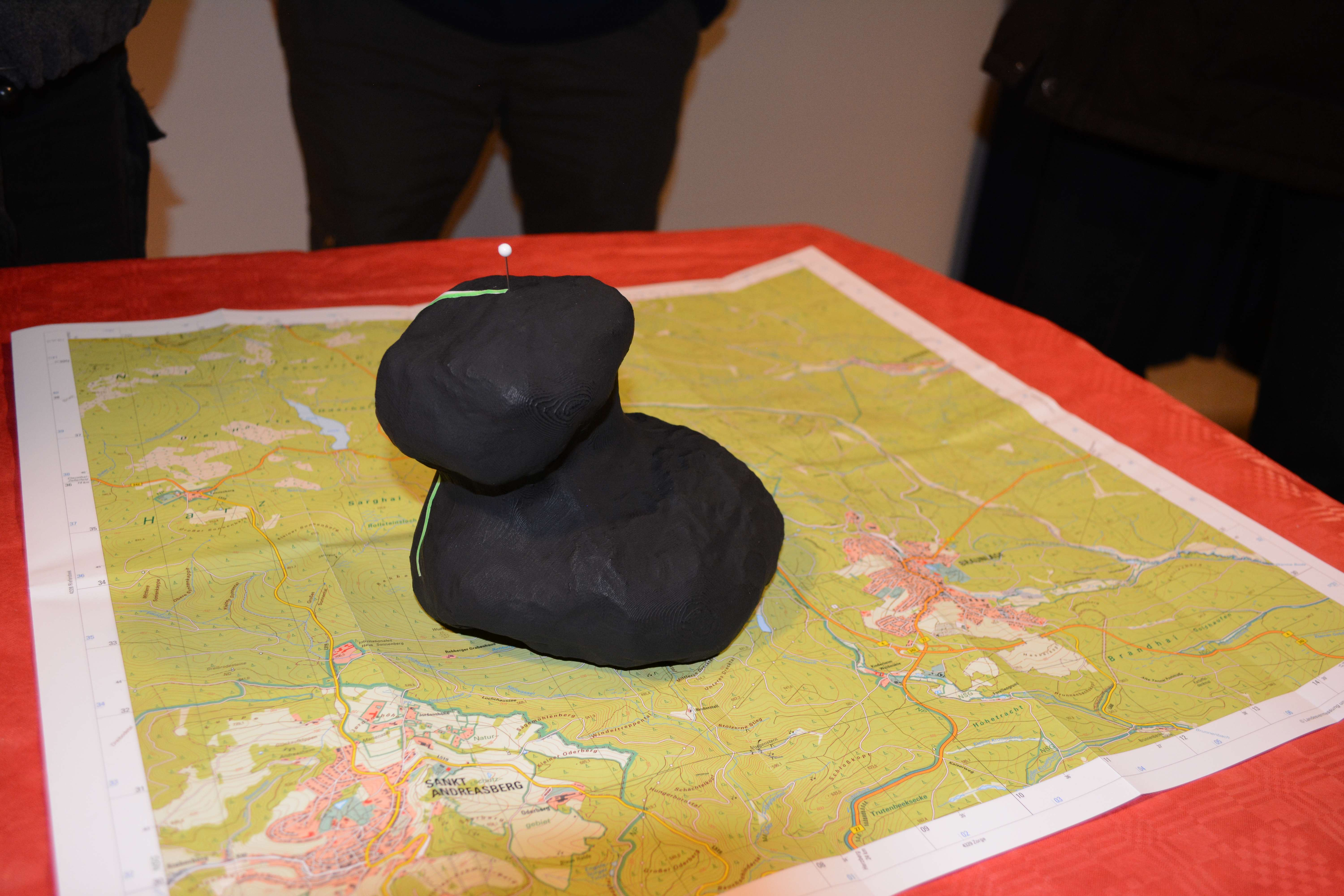
True to Scale Model of Comet Churyumov–Gerasimenko

The goal is to realise a completely barrier free observatory. It is meant to be accessible to everyone. Therefore, the building is equipped with sufficiently wide doors, step free access ways and ramps for people with mobility constraints, as well as handrails with Braille inscriptions. Offers and media provided by the observatory address all senses and also consider learning, mental, seeing, hearing and movement constraints.

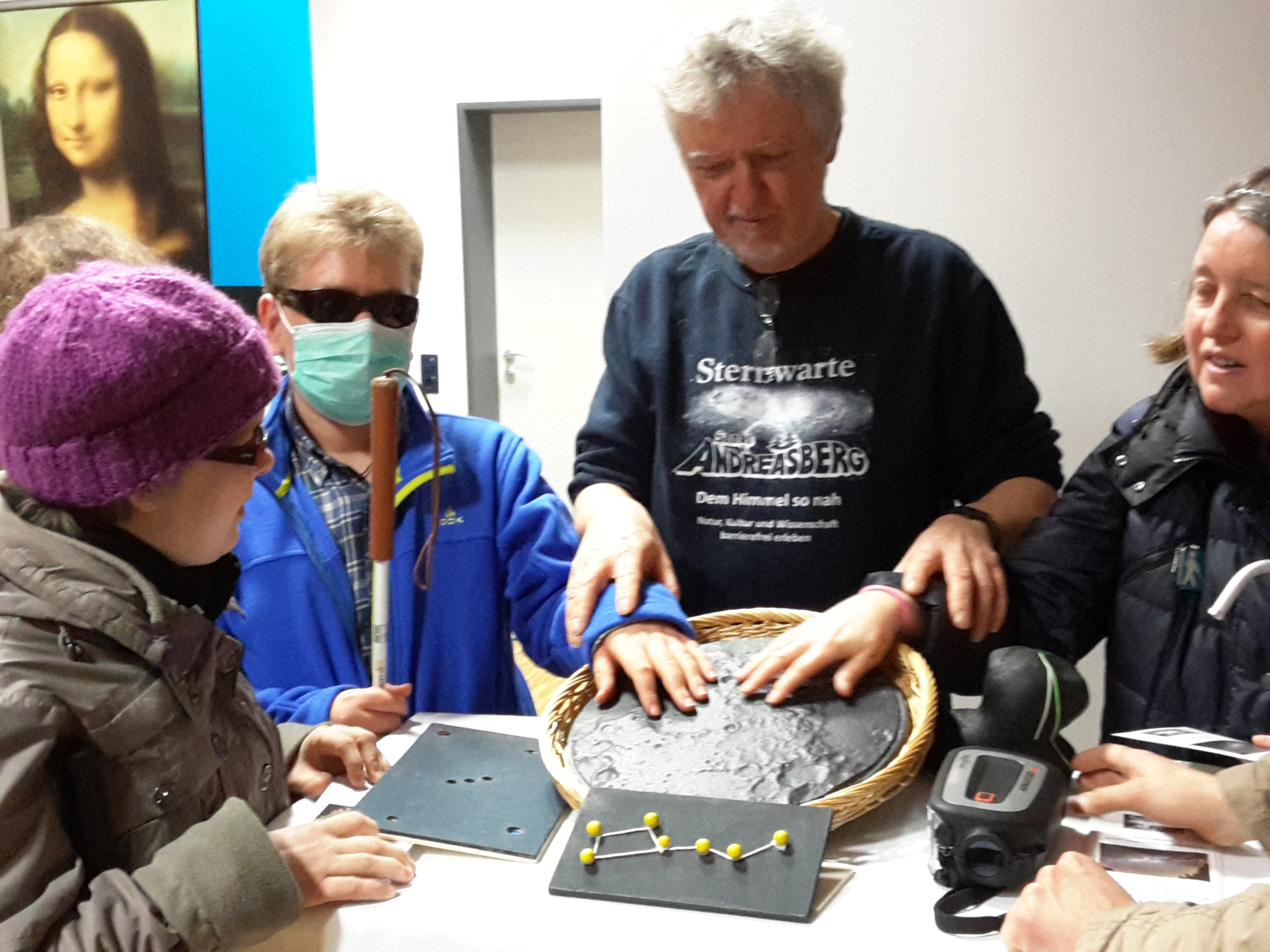
Tactile Star Charts and Model of the Lunar Surface

Tactile star charts and models of celestial objects help people with impaired vision to experience these objects and aid in the learning process by enabling the tactile sense. Depending on their kind and design, tactile star charts can be used to illustrate constellations (stars on a plane), proportions and siting (3D model). 3D printed models of the lunar surface, of whole moons, comets and asteroids enable blind people to gather an impression of their surface structure and form.

Talking telescopes enable visually impaired people to experience their own and astronomical objects' spatial orientation. A device utilises the GPS, a compass and an accelerometer to determine its own position and to support users in alignment via vocal commands, as well as naming objects it is aligned to.

Barrier free telescope mounts in the outdoor area enable people with mobility constraints to operate the telescopes. Their stable mounting aids them by enabling the telescopes to be aligned with little physical effort and little shaking. In total, five telescope mounts of different heights are provided.

Live projections from the telescopes to the lecture room let a larger audience follow observations. They assist visually impaired people by enhancing details, that are hard to see in a telescope. For people with mobility constraints, they simplify or enable access to the observation.

Model of the Lunar South Pole in Natural Lighting Conditions

A Children's and Youth's academy for Astronomy is planned to be established in cooperation with the Internationale Haus Sonnenberg, focusing on STEM fields and Environmental studies. The observatory also wants to acquire a jib-arm mount for telescopes to be used by smaller people and those in need of a wheelchair.

== Sankt Andreasberg Telescope Meet-up ==
The society has organised the Sankt Andreasberger Teleskoptreffen (STATT), or Sankt Andreasberg Telescope Meet-up, in every August since 2009, which has drawn more than 100 people interested in astronomy from all over Germany. In addition to observation opportunities, there is a lecture program. In 2014, when the observatory was officially opened, the annual meet-up of the northern German observatories was held there simultaneously.

== Cooperations ==
- Bildungsstätte Internationales Haus Sonnenberg
- Braunlage Grammar School
- Andersicht
- Goslar Community College
- Haus der Astronomie, Heidelberg, Fortbildung in Schulen Department
- Netzwerk Norddeutscher Sternwarten
- Associations of disabled people

== Awards ==
- 3rd Place Reiff Bildungspreis für Schulastronomie 2013
- 2nd Place Bildungspreis der Region Braunschweig 2014

== See also ==
- List of astronomical observatories
- Stuttgart Observatory
- Sonneberg Observatory
- Starkenburg Observatory
