= 25924 Douglasadams =

Main-belt asteroid

Discovery
- Discovered by: LINEAR
- Discovery site: Lincoln Lab's ETS
- Discovery date: 19 February 2001

Designations
- Named after: Douglas Adams (English author)
- Alternative designations: 2001 DA_{42} · 1999 VX_{149}
- Minor planet category: main-belt · (inner); Nysa–Polana complex

Orbital characteristics
- Epoch 4 September 2017 (JD 2458000.5)
- Uncertainty parameter 0
- Observation arc: 20.30 yr (7,415 days)
- Aphelion: 2.8155 AU
- Perihelion: 2.0147 AU
- Semi-major axis: 2.4151 AU
- Eccentricity: 0.1658
- Orbital period (sidereal): 3.75 yr (1,371 days)
- Mean anomaly: 51.562°
- Mean motion: 0° 15^{m} 45.36^{s} / day
- Inclination: 1.7272°
- Longitude of ascending node: 307.27°
- Argument of perihelion: 313.38°

Physical characteristics
- Dimensions: 2.410±0.528 km
- Geometric albedo: 0.210±0.139
- Absolute magnitude (H): 15.6

25924 Douglasadams (provisional designation 2001 DA_{42}) is an asteroid from the inner regions of the asteroid belt, approximately 2.4 kilometers in diameter. It was discovered on 19 February 2001, by astronomers of the Lincoln Near-Earth Asteroid Research at the Lincoln Laboratory's Experimental Test Site in New Mexico, United States. The asteroid was named for novelist Douglas Adams.

== Orbit and classification ==
Douglasadams is a member of the Nysa–Polana complex, which contains at least three asteroid families with distinct spectral types (SFC). It orbits the Sun in the inner main-belt at a distance of 2.0–2.8 AU once every 3 years and 9 months (1,371 days). Its orbit has an eccentricity of 0.17 and an inclination of 2° with respect to the ecliptic.

The body's observation arc begins with a precovery taken by Spacewatch at Kitt Peak Observatory in January 1997, more than four years prior to its official discovery observation at Lincoln Lab's ETS.

== Physical characteristics ==
The spectral type of Douglasadams is unknown. Based on its albedo (see below) it is likely a common stony S-type asteroid.

=== Diameter and albedo ===
According to the survey carried out by the NEOWISE mission of NASA's Wide-field Infrared Survey Explorer, Douglasadams measures 2.410 kilometers in diameter and its surface has an albedo of 0.210. It has an absolute magnitude of 15.6.

=== Rotation period ===
As of 2017, no rotational lightcurve of Douglasadams has been obtained from photometric observations. The asteroid's rotation period, poles and shape remain unknown.

== Naming ==
This minor planet was named in memory of English novelist Douglas Adams (1952–2001), because its provisional designation 2001 DA_{42} happened to contain the year of his death, his initials, and the Answer to the Ultimate Question of Life, the Universe, and Everything (42), as given in his novel serial The Hitchhiker's Guide to the Galaxy. The official naming citation was published by the Minor Planet Center on 25 January 2005 (M.P.C. 53471).

The asteroid 18610 Arthurdent, discovered in 1998, was named after the bewildered hero of The Hitchhiker's Guide to the Galaxy two days after Adams had died.
