= Douglas Adams =

English writer and humourist (1952–2001)

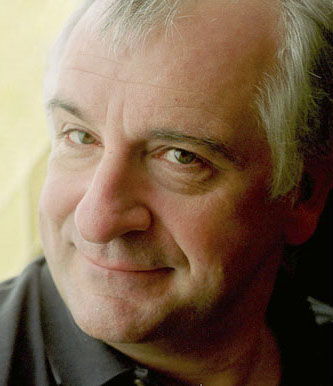
- Adams c. late 1990s
- Born: 11 March 1952; Cambridge, England
- Died: 11 May 2001 (aged 49); Santa Barbara, California, U.S.
- Burial place: Highgate Cemetery, London
- Education: University of Cambridge
- Occupations: Author; screenwriter; humourist; satirist
- Spouse: Jane Belson (m. 1991)
- Children: 1
- Writing career
- Years active: 1974–2001
- Genres: Comedy; satire; science fiction; absurdism

Signature
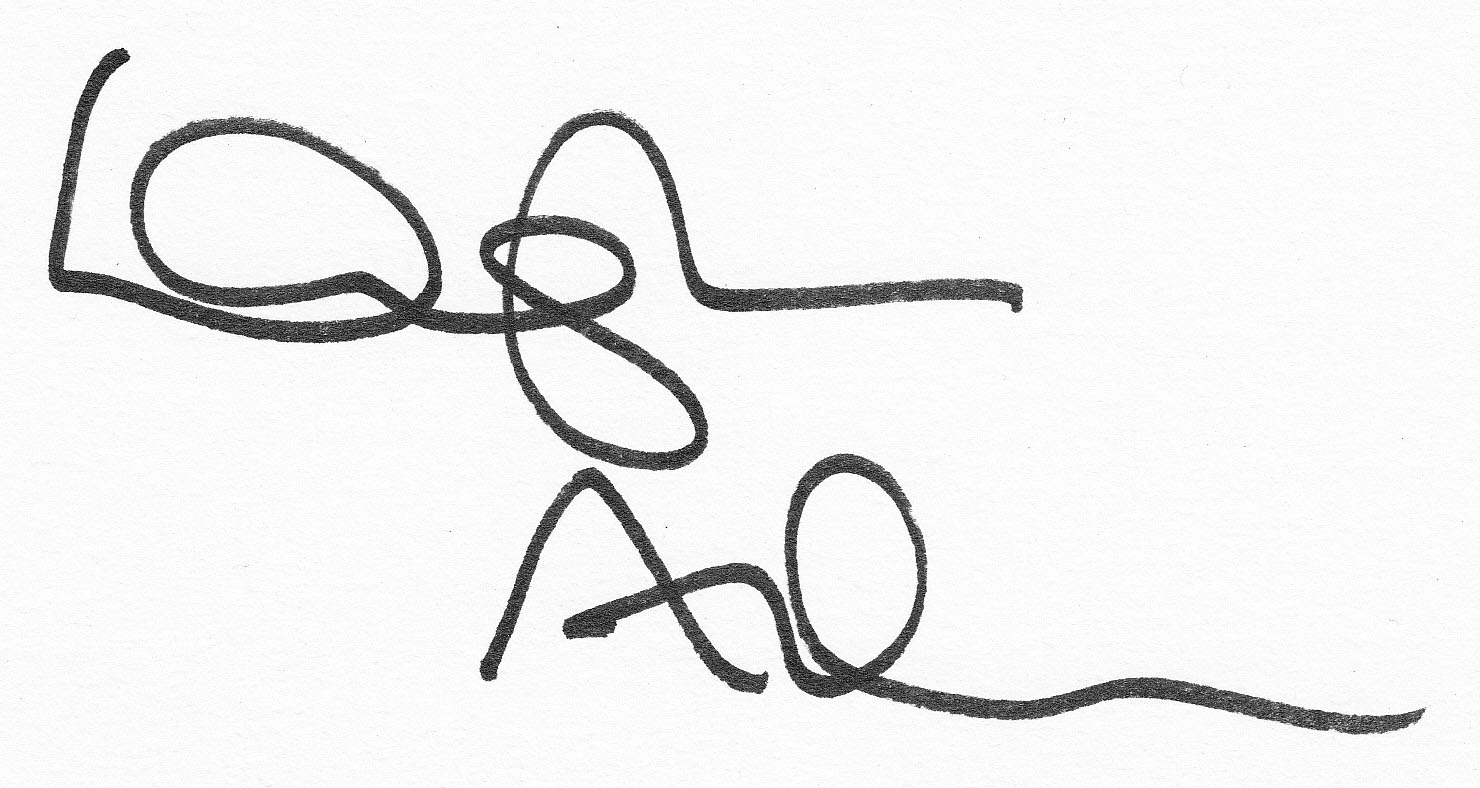
- Website: douglasadams.com

Douglas Noël Adams (11 March 1952 – 11 May 2001) was an English author, humourist, and screenwriter. He wrote The Hitchhiker's Guide to the Galaxy, which originated in 1978 as a BBC radio comedy, before developing into a "trilogy of five books" (Note: Eoin Colfer wrote the sixth and final book in the series, And Another Thing... (2009).) that sold more than 14 million copies in his lifetime. He also adapted it into a 1981 television series, a 1984 video game and a 2005 feature film.

Adams was born in Cambridge and raised in Essex. In 1971, he entered St John's College, Cambridge, where he became a member of the student comedy club Footlights. Despite initial hopes to become a comedian in the mould of John Cleese, Adams began his career as a television and radio writer. Although a brief writing partnership with Graham Chapman gave Adams a credit on a 1974 episode of Monty Python's Flying Circus, he entered a period of career difficulty, with many pitched projects going unproduced. In 1978, he was commissioned to write for Doctor Who and served as script editor for its 17th season (1979–1980).

The success of the first radio series and 1979 book adaptation of The Hitchhiker's Guide to the Galaxy led to sudden fame for Adams. He subsequently wrote the novels Dirk Gently's Holistic Detective Agency (1987) and The Long Dark Tea-Time of the Soul (1988), and co-wrote the comic dictionaries The Meaning of Liff (1983) and The Deeper Meaning of Liff (1990), and the travel book Last Chance to See (1990).

Adams's writing output declined in the 1990s. He developed various digital media projects, including co-founding the company The Digital Village, and lectured prolifically on information technology. He died in 2001, aged 49. A posthumous collection of his selected works, including chapters of his final unfinished novel, was published in The Salmon of Doubt (2002). He was known for his environmental advocacy, his self-described "radical atheism", his infamous tendency to procrastinate, and his love of music.

== Early life and education ==
=== Family ===
Douglas Noël Adams (Note: Biographers M. J. Simpson and Nick Webb spell his middle name "Noël", with a diaresis.) was born in Cambridge on 11 March 1952 to Christopher Douglas Adams, a management consultant and computer salesman who formerly worked as a probation officer, and nurse Janet Dora Sydney Adams (née Donovan). He had English, Scottish, Irish and German ancestry. His paternal grandfather, born in Glasgow, came from a long line of distinguished doctors. Adams later joked that he had been DNA, his initials, in Cambridge before DNA, as he was born nine months before the publication of Francis Crick and James Watson's 1953 paper.

Shortly after his birth, the family moved to the East End of London. His sister Susan was born in March 1955. By the time he was five his parents had divorced; Douglas, Susan and their mother subsequently moved to an RSPCA animal shelter in Brentwood run by his maternal grandparents. Each parent remarried, giving Adams several half-siblings. (Note: In 1960, Christopher remarried to Mary Judith Stewart (née Robertson). In 1964, Janet remarried to Ron Thrift.)

=== Education ===
Adams attended Primrose Hill Primary School in Brentwood. He entered the prep school for Brentwood School in September 1959. Adams felt isolated at school because of his large stature; he was 6 feet (180 cm) tall by the age of 12, and stopped growing at 6 feet 5 inches (196 cm). His form master Frank Halford had a profound influence on him. Adams was the only student to whom Halford awarded 10/10 for creative writing – something Adams remembered for the rest of his life, particularly when facing writer's block.

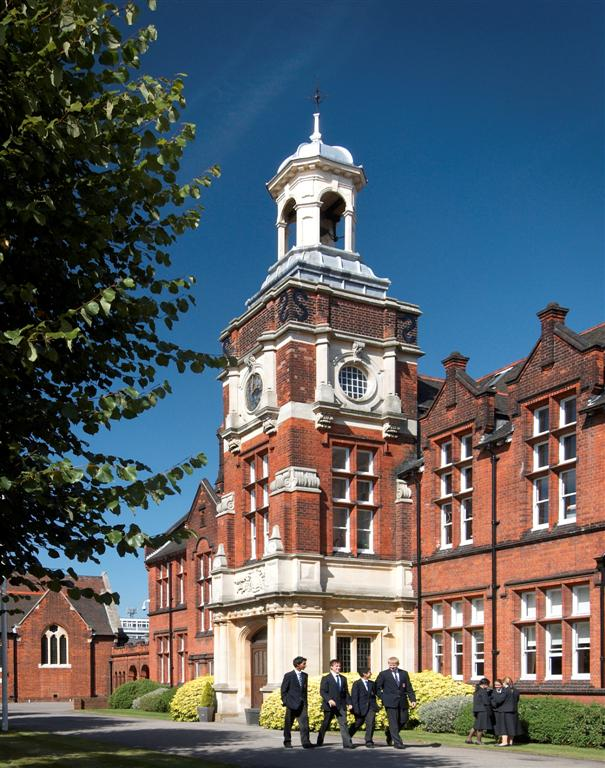
Adams attended Brentwood School in Essex (pictured in 2010)

Some of his earliest writing was published at Brentwood School. His first published work was a brief report on the prep school's photography society in The Brentwoodian in September 1962. He was a fan of the BBC science fiction series Doctor Who and wrote a sketch about Daleks powered by Rice Krispies. His poem "Tramp's Eye View", written when he was twelve years old, is held by the University of Cambridge. In 1965, his surreal short story Suspense was published in the children's comic Eagle. A poem written by Adams in January 1970 was discovered in a school cupboard in early 2014. He became a boarder at the school in September 1964, and eventually left in December 1970.

On the strength of a religious poetry essay that discussed the Beatles and William Blake, Adams was awarded an exhibition to study English at St John's College, Cambridge, where his father had studied. He entered the university in 1971, hoping to follow in the footsteps of comedy writer-performers like Monty Python. Adams desperately wanted to join Footlights, the invitation-only student comedy club, and was elected to the club in February 1972. However he was disappointed by its aloof culture. He began writing comedy sketches with fellow student Keith Jeffery (with whom he shared a room), but this partnership ended in November 1972.

Once he had established himself in Footlights, Adams quickly sought out his idol John Cleese of Monty Python, interviewing him for the student newspaper Varsity in November 1972. Adams was inspired by Cleese's work on The Frost Report (1966–67) and similarly tall stature, later admitting "I wanted to be John Cleese and it took me some time to realise that the job was taken".

Adams subsequently wrote and performed in revues with students Will Adams (no relation) and Martin Smith; their troupe was called "Adams-Smith-Adams". Although Adams-Smith-Adams's written material featured prominently in Footlights' 1974 May Week Revue (titled Chox), Douglas was disappointed when he was not cast on the basis that his performing abilities were not strong enough. He later stated "for some reason the world wasn't that keen on me being a performer. And probably quite rightly". He graduated in 1974 with a 2:2 in English literature. (Note: Adams claimed to have written only three essays in his time at St John's, but surviving work shows he completed a great deal more work.) Many of Adams's Cambridge peers played important roles in his career, such as Jon Canter, John Lloyd, Mary Allen and Simon Jones. Adams took a series of odd jobs during his time at Cambridge, which included working as a hospital porter and a chicken-shed cleaner.

== Career ==
=== 1974–1977: Early career and collaboration with Graham Chapman ===
Adams moved back to London after leaving university, determined to break into television and radio as a writer. The BBC occasionally accepted sketches from Adams, but his writing style was unsuited to the current style of radio and television comedy. To make ends meet he took a job as a bodyguard for a wealthy Arab family, which involved long night shifts guarding their hotel rooms.

Adams in his first Monty Python appearance, in surgeon's garb

Cleese quit Monty Python's Flying Circus in early 1974, leaving his writing partner Graham Chapman to search for a new collaborator. Chapman met Adams in July 1974 at the West End opening night party of Chox. The two formed a writing partnership, earning Adams a writing credit in Monty Python's fourth series (1974) for the sketch "Patient Abuse". Adams also contributed to the "Marilyn Monroe" sketch that appeared on The Album of the Soundtrack of the Trailer of the Film of Monty Python and the Holy Grail (1975). Adams later stated that his contributions were "hardly worth mentioning" and that he had written "about half a dozen lines that appeared here and there in Python". Nevertheless, he is one of only two non-Python members to receive a writing credit on the television series (the other is Neil Innes). Adams had two brief appearances in Monty Python's fourth series. In "The Light Entertainment War", Adams is in a surgeon's mask (as Dr. Emile Koning, according to on-screen captions) pulling on gloves. In "Mr. Neutron", Adams is dressed in a pepper-pot outfit and loads a missile onto a cart driven by Terry Jones, who is calling for scrap metal ("Any old iron..."). Jones was the Python member with whom Adams formed the closest friendship.

Adams and Chapman co-wrote a 1974 comedy science fiction script as a vehicle for Ringo Starr, which was rejected by all major American television networks. Adams, Chapman and Bernard McKenna co-wrote a 1976 television pilot, Out of the Trees. The pilot did not go to series. Adams was disappointed by the production, stating it "actually had some very good material in it, but just didn't hang together properly".

Adams submitted at least two story outlines to the Doctor Who production office, in 1974 and 1976, which were rejected. His first concept, about a spaceship full of useless passengers fleeing a catastrophe, was rejected for being too similar to The Ark in Space (1975). (Note: This idea was reused in The Hitchhiker's Guide to the Galaxy for the Golgafrincham fleet.) The second story concept, Doctor Who and the Krikkitmen, was rejected by producer Graham Williams for being "too silly". The Adams-Smith-Adams trio continued working together until late 1975. Adams directed Footlights' 1976 May Week Revue, A Kick in the Stalls. In August 1976, his career had a brief improvement when he co-wrote and performed Unpleasantness at Brodie's Close at the Edinburgh Festival Fringe with John Lloyd, David Renwick and Andrew Marshall. By the end of the year, Adams's career again stalled and he moved in with his family in Stalbridge, Dorset.

Adams and Chapman wrote the episode "For Your Own Good" for the sitcom Doctor on the Go, but by the time it aired in February 1977, Adams had ended their partnership as Chapman's heavy drinking made him difficult to work with. The two men also "virtually came to blows" over Adams's assistance in writing Chapman's autobiography. Adams expected his Monty Python work to be his big break, but was disappointed that he had "nothing to show for it except a large overdraft and not much achieved". He subsequently "went through a total crisis of confidence".

Adams became obsessed with combining the comedy and science fiction genres in a single project. Adams and John Lloyd shared a passion for science fiction, and the two men unsuccessfully developed various comedy projects, such as The Swasivious Zebu, Knight and Day and a Guinness Book of Records film. The latter project, which involved aliens competing with humans in an intergalactic sporting event, was cancelled due to there being "no market for science fiction films". Adams and Lloyd also pitched Sno 7 and the White Dwarfs, a radio sitcom about two astrophysicists trapped in a Mount Everest observatory, but were told by the BBC that science fiction was "too 1950s". Adams's first professional solo work was a sketch for the radio comedy series The Burkiss Way, broadcast in early 1977. Around the same time he wrote for The News Huddlines.

=== 1977–1978: The Hitchhiker's Guide to the Galaxy radio series ===
Cast and crew of the first Hitchhiker's Guide radio series. From left: Adams, producer Geoffrey Perkins, actors David Tate, Geoffrey McGivern, Mark Wing-Davey, Simon Jones and Alan Ford.

Adams was frustrated by his writing career and considered leaving the industry and moving to Hong Kong. In 1977, he finally got his chance to work on a comedy science fiction series when producer Simon Brett encouraged him to pitch one to BBC Radio 4. Adams's initial idea was The Ends of the Earth, an anthology series where the Earth was destroyed in a different way each episode. He started developing the pilot episode—in which Earth is demolished to make way for a hyperspace express route—and realised he needed an alien character to provide context. He decided this character should be a journalist who had come to Earth researching for a guide book for space travellers. Adams first conceived of the title in 1971 while he lay drunk in a field in Innsbruck gazing at the stars. He was carrying a copy of the Hitch-hiker's Guide to Europe, and it occurred to him that somebody should write a Hitchhiker's Guide to the Galaxy. (Note: Several of Adams's Cambridge friends recall Adams telling them that he had the idea while spending the night on a rock in Santorini in summer 1973. According to Adams, "the constant need to repeat the story has now completely obliterated my memory of the actual event". In 1994, he stated: "I've now told this story so often that I can only remember the story and I can't remember the event anymore. So I have to take my own word for it that it's true.") He abandoned the anthology approach in favour of a single narrative following the travels of ordinary Englishman Arthur Dent and his alien friend Ford Prefect. Adams submitted the pilot script on 4 April, and the episode was recorded on 28 June (starring Adams's Footlights' peers Simon Jones and Geoffrey McGivern as Dent and Prefect respectively).

Whilst Adams was awaiting a commission for the series, BBC radio script editor Richard Imison sent his pilot script to the Doctor Who production office. Script editor Anthony Read was impressed and asked Adams to devise a storyline for a Doctor Who serial. Adams developed a story about a hollow planet which materialises around smaller planets to plunder their resources. On 18 July, he was commissioned to expand the idea into a story breakdown. The remaining five episodes of The Hitchhiker's Guide to the Galaxy were commissioned on 1 September, followed by the Doctor Who serial on 20 October. After years of inactivity, Adams found himself writing for two BBC series simultaneously.

Adams developed The Hitchhiker's Guide to the Galaxy series episode-by-episode, without an overarching storyline. Facing time constraints, he turned to John Lloyd to co-write the final two episodes; Lloyd contributed concepts from his unfinished novel GiGax. The radio series, directed by Geoffrey Perkins (with the exception of the pilot, directed by Brett), was innovative in its use of sound effects and music. It was the first radio comedy programme to be produced in stereo. (Note: The programme was temporarily listed as a drama, as the BBC would only allow dramas to be recorded in stereo.) Adams wanted the series to sound "like a rock album". Unusually for a writer, he was heavily involved in its post-production. The Hitchhiker's Guide to the Galaxy's first series, broadcast weekly from 8 March 1978, quickly became a hit with audiences and spread via positive word of mouth. By its fourth episode, the Post Office was receiving letters addressed to Megadodo (the fictional publisher of the guide book).

Adams got a job as a BBC radio producer in May 1978 "for the money", and worked on satirical programme Week Ending, documentary Here's More Egg on Your Face and panel show The News Quiz. He produced only one original project, a pantomime version of Cinderella, Black Cinderella Two Goes East. In August, Adams was commissioned to write a Christmas special (broadcast on Christmas Eve) and a second series of The Hitchhiker's Guide to the Galaxy.

=== 1978–1984: Script editor on Doctor Who, early Hitchhiker's novels ===
In August 1978, Pan Books bought the rights to a novel based on The Hitchhiker's Guide to the Galaxy. Adams was thrilled that the opportunity had come to him so easily. He arranged to co-write the novel with Lloyd, but had a change of heart and told Lloyd he would write it alone—a decision which damaged their friendship, especially as Lloyd was in debt at the time. Lloyd swiftly got an entertainment agent, who advised him to take "10 per cent of anything with the name Hitchhiker on it". Lloyd was "appalled" and settled for splitting the £3000 advance. Adams later stated that his decision to write the novel solo "was perfectly within my rights. On the other hand, I should have handled it a bit better". Adams only adapted the series' first four episodes for the novel as he did not want to use any co-written material. (Note: This was the reason given by Adams in contemporary interviews. He later attributed the novel's incomplete adaptation of the series' storyline to his procrastination.)

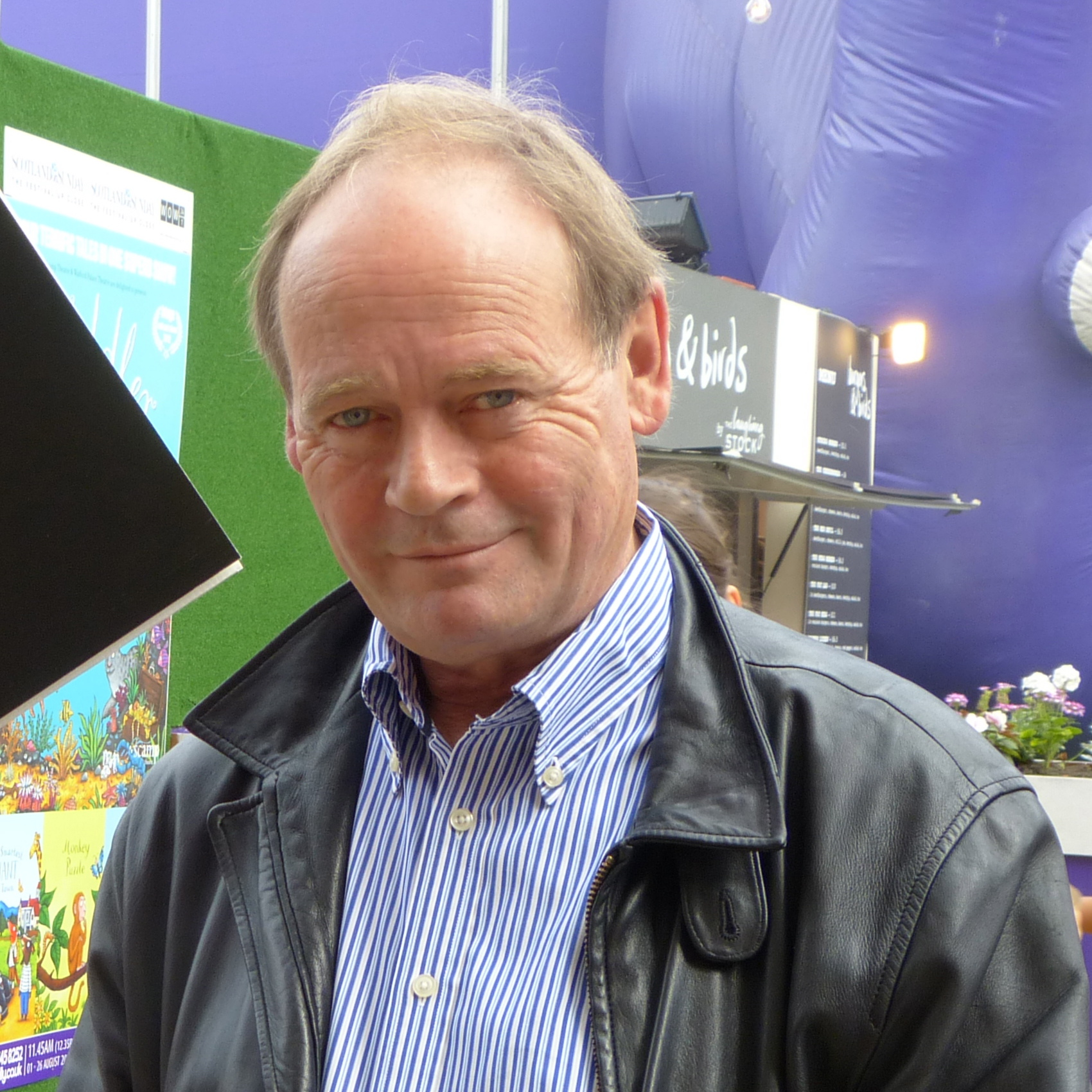
Adams often worked with writer John Lloyd (pictured in 2013); they co-wrote The Meaning of Liff books and two episodes of the Hitchhiker's Guide radio series.

Adams's first Doctor Who serial, The Pirate Planet (1978), aired on BBC1 from 30 September to 21 October. Adams left his radio producer position in October 1978 to replace Read as Doctor Who's script editor for season 17 (1979–80). The Hitchhiker's Guide to the Galaxy began to be adapted across multiple media. Ken Campbell produced a stage version in May 1979.

As Doctor Who script editor, Adams heavily rewrote Terry Nation's script for Destiny of the Daleks (1979) "almost from the ground up" to bring it within budget, but was uncredited. He co-wrote City of Death (1979) with Graham Williams, from an original storyline by David Fisher; it was credited to the pseudonym "David Agnew". In 2008, The Daily Telegraph named City of Death one of the ten greatest Doctor Who stories. Adams wrote the unaired serial Shada, which was only partly filmed due to industrial action at the BBC. (Note: Scenes from Shada were used in the episode "The Five Doctors" (1983) after Tom Baker declined to take part.) Adams also pitched a story for season 17 where the Doctor becomes a bitter recluse and is eventually called back into action. This later inspired Steven Moffat to write the 2012 Doctor Who Christmas special "The Snowmen". Adams and actor Tom Baker tried unsuccessfully to pitch a film treatment of Doctor Who and the Krikkitmen from April 1978 to at least 1980. Adams left Doctor Who in late 1979. In addition to his work on Doctor Who, Adams co-wrote with John Lloyd two 1979 episodes of the animated children's show Doctor Snuggles, "The Remarkable Fidgety River" and "The Great Disappearing Mystery".

The Hitchhiker's Guide novel adaptation (titled The Hitchhiker's Guide to the Galaxy), published in October 1979, was an instant bestseller. It sold one million copies faster than any title in Pan's history and the US rights for the novel and its sequel sold for $2.3 million. Adams described his sudden success as "like being helicoptered to the top of Mount Everest, or having an orgasm without the foreplay." The second Hitchhiker's Guide radio series was broadcast in five parts in January 1980. Theatr Clwyd toured a stage version of Hitchhiker's Guide in Wales from January to February 1980. A financially-disappointing July 1980 stage adaptation at the Rainbow Theatre was called "a fiasco" by Adams; he criticised the large venue and overdone stage effects.

The novel's sequel, The Restaurant at the End of the Universe (1980), also a bestseller, reworked elements from both radio series and the Christmas special. Both series were condensed and re-recorded for an LP release. Adams adapted the first radio series into a 1981 BBC television miniseries, in which various members of the radio cast reprised their roles. Adams was disappointed with the television adaptation, finding it clunky, and clashed with producer Alan J. W. Bell.

The novels became the core of the Hitchhiker's franchise. The third novel, Life, the Universe and Everything (1982), was the first novel not to be adapted from the radio series; instead, Adams recycled his unproduced Krikkitmen storyline. Adams and Lloyd co-wrote The Meaning of Liff (1983), a mock dictionary book filled with humorous definitions of "things that there should be words for but aren't". Upon the publication of the fourth Hitchhiker's novel, So Long, and Thanks for All the Fish (1984), he began to jokingly describe the series as a "trilogy". Adams only intended to write two novels in the series and felt trapped by the franchise's success.

=== 1984–2001: Digital media projects and environmental activism ===
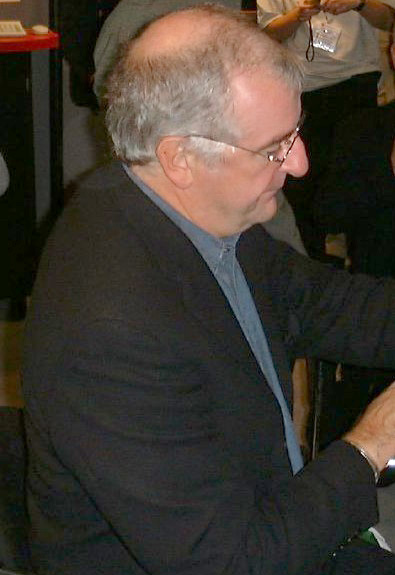
Adams at software convention ApacheCon in 2000

In 1984, Adams and Steve Meretzky co-created a video game adaptation of The Hitchhiker's Guide for Infocom. The game sold 400,000 copies and was one of the best-selling titles of its time. Computer Gaming World included the game on their 1996 list of the 150 best games of all-time.

In 1985, the World Wildlife Fund and The Observer organised for Adams and naturalist Mark Carwardine to travel to Madagascar to search for the endangered aye-aye. They succeeded in capturing the first photograph of an aye-aye in the wild. Adams found the trip hugely enjoyable and profound.

Adams participated in a week-long brainstorming session with the Lucasfilm Games team for the game Labyrinth (1986), based on the fantasy film of the same name. He conceived of the game's transition from a text-based format to a graphical one, as a reference to The Wizard of Oz's black-and-white to colour transition. Adams subsequently wrote the game Bureaucracy (1987), but after its disappointing reception (it sold only 40,000 copies), he stepped away from the video game industry for a time.

Chafing at the pressure from publishers to write more Hitchhiker's Guide to the Galaxy novel, Adams broke away with a new novel series. He satirised detective fiction with Dirk Gently's Holistic Detective Agency (1987), a humorous whodunit novel about a "holistic" private detective named Dirk Gently. As Shada's production was abandoned, Adams reused its story elements in the novel. A sequel, The Long Dark Tea-Time of the Soul, was published in 1988.

Adams and Carwardine spent 1988 travelling the world in search of other endangered species, such as the kākāpō and baiji, and chronicled their journey in a 1989 documentary radio series and 1990 companion book, both titled Last Chance to See. It was the book Adams was most proud of, and he was disappointed by its relative lack of success. He became an environmental activist and campaigned on behalf of endangered species. Adams and Carwardine later contributed the "Meeting a Gorilla" passage from their book to The Great Ape Project (1994). Adams was a signatory to the Great Ape Project, which argued for moral equality for great apes. He was also a supporter of the Dian Fossey Gorilla Fund.

Adams was exhausted by writing and produced fewer books in the 1990s. He wrote and presented the "fantasy documentary" Hyperland (1990) which featured Tom Baker as the personification of a software programme. It discussed Vannevar Bush's Memex and Douglas Engelbart's The Mother of All Demos, and included an interview with Ted Nelson on Project Xanadu. Adams and Lloyd co-wrote a sequel to The Meaning of Liff, The Deeper Meaning of Liff (1990).

Adams was unhappy with his script for Shada, calling it a "patchwork", and was extremely displeased when the existing footage was released on home media in 1992 (it has been stated that he signed over permission for the project's release by accident). Per his request, he was not credited on the release and his fee was donated to Comic Relief. He stated that if Shada "had been finished and broadcast, it would never have aroused so much interest." The fifth novel in the Hitchhiker's series, Mostly Harmless, was published in 1992. A three-part comic book adaptation of The Hitchhiker's Guide to the Galaxy was published in 1993.

Adams climbing Mount Kilimanjaro in 1994, while wearing a rhino costume, for the charity Save the Rhino.

Adams was a founder patron of the British charity Save the Rhino. In 1994, Adams participated in a climb of Mount Kilimanjaro for the charity; for part of the event he wore a rhino costume.

In 1995, Adams and his friend Robbie Stamp founded The Digital Village, a digital media and technology company to produce video game adaptations of Adams's work. Adams took the title of "Chief Fantasist". At the company he created Starship Titanic (1998), a Codie award-winning and BAFTA-nominated adventure game. In April 1999, Adams initiated h2g2, a public wiki which served as an online encyclopedia—an experimental attempt at making The Hitchhiker's Guide to the Galaxy a reality. The Digital Village changed its name to h2g2 in 1999. Adams hosted the radio documentaries The Internet: The Last 20th Century Battleground (1999) and The Hitchhikers' Guide to the Future (2000). With the dotcom crash, h2g2 was sold to the BBC in January 2001, who continued to run and maintain the project until 2011. Adams became a prolific lecturer on information technology, which friend Jon Canter said allowed him to fulfil his desire to become a writer-performer. He was a keynote speaker at Microsoft's 1996 Professional Developers Conference (PDC) and the April 2001 Embedded Systems Conference, both held in San Francisco.

Before his death, Adams was writing a third Dirk Gently novel, which he apparently considered adapting into a sixth Hitchhiker's Guide novel. The unfinished novel was posthumously published in The Salmon of Doubt (2002).

== Style, themes and influences ==
Despite Adams's association with science fiction, he stated that he was not a science fiction writer but rather a comedy writer working in the genre of science fiction simply because he "exaggerated so much". (Note: The Hitchhiker's Guide to the Galaxy has been described as more of a "lampoon" or "mock" science fiction rather than an earnest instalment in the genre.) Adams stated: "I do feel that humour should not undermine a story but rather underpin it". He also thought of himself more as a screenwriter than a novelist, stating in 1994 that the medium of radio was "still in many ways my favourite". His chief literary influence was P. G. Wodehouse. Other influences included Evelyn Waugh, Jane Austen and Kurt Vonnegut. Adams downplayed comparisons between himself and Vonnegut: "Vonnegut is essentially a deeply serious writer who uses comedy to make his points, and I am essentially a comic writer who occasionally tries to slip a point about something or other 'under the counter'... I find the comparison embarrassing because he's a great writer, and I think I'm essentially a frivolous one". Adams has also been compared with Lewis Carroll and Jonathan Swift.

"Far out in the uncharted backwaters of the unfashionable end of the Western Spiral arm of the Galaxy lies a small unregarded yellow sun. Orbiting this at a distance of roughly ninety-two million miles is an utterly insignificant little blue green planet whose ape-descended life forms are so amazingly primitive that they still think digital watches are a pretty neat idea."

— The opening sentences of The Hitchhiker's Guide to the Galaxy (1979), which illustrate Adams's writing style, existentialist themes and satire of modern society.

Adams's writing is characterised by deadpan humour, wordplay and what The Economist described as "deftly executed one-liners". His storylines often intentionally subvert drama and narrative closure, with asides that diverge from the main plot. (Note: Due to his habit for procrastination, the conclusions to his novels have been described as "abrupt" or "cobbled together".) His work has been described as existentialist, as The Hitchhiker's Guide to the Galaxy emphasises the insignificance of humanity's social and political troubles in a vast, meaningless universe. The ordinary Arthur Dent repeatedly finds himself accidentally travelling through ludicrous alien worlds, and resorts to a quintessentially English cup of tea to prevent himself from going mad. One of the novel's best-known jokes is the anticlimactic discovery of the answer to life, the universe and everything: "42". Additionally, a machine calculating the "Ultimate Question" of life is destroyed five minutes before its completion. Dent and Ford Prefect have been compared to the two main characters of Samuel Beckett's tragicomedy play Waiting for Godot. In contrast, the Dirk Gently series foregrounds humanity's far-reaching impact on the Earth, with Adams criticising man-made pollution and extinction.

Bureaucracy is a recurring theme in Adams's work. The goal of his video game Bureaucracy is solely to get a bank to acknowledge a change-of-address card. The Vogons are easily recognisable as a satire of middle-management work culture. Adams invites comparisons between the Vogon captain, who unsympathetically demolishes the Earth to develop a hyperspace express route, and a bureaucratic civil servant, who unsympathetically demolishes Arthur's house to develop a bypass. Adams also commented on his frustrations with technology companies; artificially intelligent machines are programmed with "genuine people personalities", resulting in annoyingly cheerful doors, depressed robots and existential elevators. Despite billionaire Elon Musk's appreciation of The Hitchhiker's Guide, the historian Jill Lepore described the novel as "a razor-sharp satiric indictment of imperialism". Adams wrote the novel on a typewriter that bore a sticker reading "End Apartheid". Writing for The Guardian, Jenny Turner described the story as a "post-colonial metaphor". The reveal that dolphins and mice are more intelligent than humans satirises humanity's belief in its superiority over the animal kingdom. Adams also promotes environmentalism in the Dirk Gently series. Economist Ha-Joon Chang notes that Adams references Thorstein Veblen’s theory of conspicuous consumption as well as the theory of underconsumption.

Adams's "flimsy" characterisation of female characters has been criticised. Adams professed: "I find women completely mysterious anyway. I never know what they want. And I always get nervous about writing one as I always think I'll do something terribly wrong". Nick Webb, Adams's biographer, stated that Adams's early female characters tended to be mere foils for the male characters, but that this notably improved with the fully-rounded depiction of Kate Schechter in The Salmon of Doubt.

== Personal life and interests ==
=== Relationships ===
From February to December 1981, Adams was in a relationship with novelist Sally Emerson, who was then separated from her husband Peter Stothard. Adams dedicated Life, the Universe and Everything to her. Their relationship ended when she returned to her husband.

Shortly afterwards, Adams's friends introduced him to barrister Jane Elizabeth Belson as a replacement flatmate. They became romantically involved. The couple lived in Los Angeles together in 1983 while Adams worked on an early screenplay of the Hitchhiker's Guide to the Galaxy film. When the deal fell through, they moved back to Islington, London. Adams and Belson separated in 1988, but resumed their relationship in 1991. They married on 25 November 1991. (Note: Belson did not take Adams's surname.) The couple had a daughter in 1994. Belson died on 7 September 2011.

=== Procrastination ===
"I love deadlines. I love the whooshing noise they make as they go by."

— Douglas Adams, in a widely quoted citation of unknown origin

Adams struggled with writing and usually did not find pleasure from it. He often suffered from low confidence and writer's block, resulting in sometimes extreme procrastination. Weeks before his manuscript for So Long, and Thanks for All the Fish was due, he had only written 25 pages. He was locked in a hotel suite with Sonny Mehta (editorial director of Pan Books) who kept an eye on him until the manuscript was completed. The 1997 tie-in novel to Starship Titanic was ultimately written by Terry Jones because Adams kept putting it off. On Quote... Unquote, Adams suggested his own epitaph: "He finally met his deadline."

=== Views on religion ===
"...imagine a puddle waking up one morning and thinking, 'This is an interesting world I find myself in - an interesting hole I find myself in – fits me rather neatly, doesn't it? In fact it fits me staggeringly well, must have been made to have me in it!'"

— Adams in September 1998, expressing disbelief in the fine-tuned universe argument for God

Adams's parents belonged to a Christian community, and he described his childhood self as "extremely religious" and an "active Christian". In 1984, Adams stated he was "very firmly agnostic" and that atheism seemed irrational as "there's no evidence either way". In 1998 he described himself as a "radical atheist". He added "radical" for emphasis so he would not be mistaken for an agnostic. He remained fascinated by religion because of its effect on human affairs, stating "I love to keep poking and prodding at it. I've thought about it so much over the years that that fascination is bound to spill over into my writing." He enjoyed chapel choir and Christmas carols into adulthood.

Adams was a friend of the evolutionary biologist and atheist activist Richard Dawkins. Adams introduced Dawkins to Lalla Ward, whom Dawkins married. Dawkins invited Adams to participate in his 1991 Royal Institution Christmas Lectures, Growing Up in the Universe. Adams read a passage from The Restaurant at the End of the Universe about a talking cow which had been bred to desire being eaten. Dawkins dedicated The God Delusion (2006) to Adams. In it, Dawkins jokingly called Adams his "possibly only convert" to atheism.

=== Computers ===
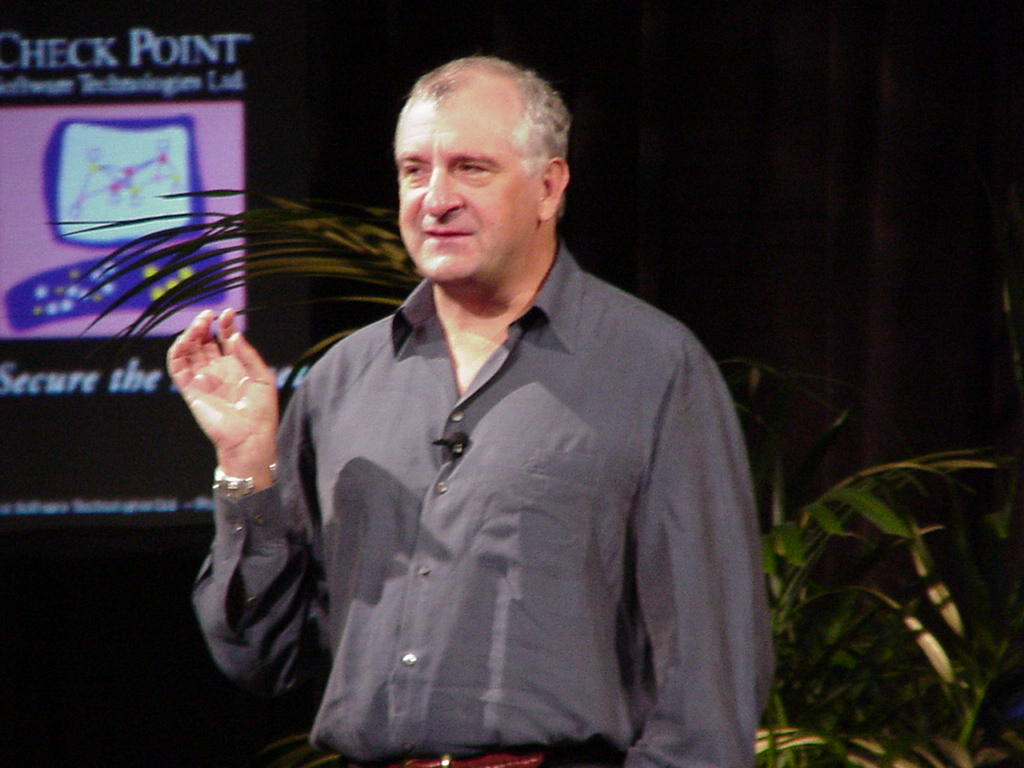
Adams speaking at the Internet Security Conference in March 2000

One of the first computers Adams saw was a Commodore PET. He bought his first word processor (a Nexus) in 1982, having considered using one as early as 1979. When he and his future wife Jane Belson moved to Los Angeles in 1983, he bought a DEC Rainbow. Upon their return to England, Adams bought an Apricot, then a BBC Micro and a Tandy 1000. He brought his Cambridge Z88 to Zaire on safari for Last Chance to See. Adams intermittently used a Hermes typewriter for writing "when he got stuck".

Adams first saw an Apple Macintosh at Infocom's Boston offices in 1984. It was "love at first sight". Adams and Stephen Fry were the first two individuals to buy a Mac in Europe. Adams accumulated numerous Macintoshes over the years, and he was also an "AppleMaster" (celebrities whom Apple used as spokespeople for its products). Adams created a rock video featuring his daughter Polly using the first version of iMovie, which was available on his .Mac homepage. Adams installed and started using Mac OS X in the weeks leading up to his death. His last post to his own forum was in praise of Mac OS X and the possibilities of its Cocoa framework. An Apple Macintosh SE/30 once owned by Adams is on display at the Centre for Computing History in Cambridge.

Adams was an early adopter of the internet. He used email to correspond with Steve Meretzky in the early 1980s, during their collaboration on The Hitchhiker's Guide video game. He allowed his email address to be widely publicised so he could receive fan mail. While working in New Mexico in October 1993 he began posting to his own USENET newsgroup.

=== Music ===
Adams (wearing white) playing guitar with David Gilmour of Pink Floyd in 1994

Music featured prominently in Adams's life and fiction, and he cited the Beatles as one of his chief creative influences. He was a left-hander, and had a collection of 24 left-handed electric guitars and also studied piano as a child, though he was poor at keeping time with other musicians. Adams said that "Man of Mystery" by The Shadows stoked his interest in guitar. He joked that Paul Simon taught him guitar though he didn't know it, as he taught himself to play by plucking out Simon's songs. He formed an act with Ken Follet, the Hard Covers, and said they discovered "most writers are actually frustrated rock stars." At the age of 41, he joked that he was "too young to be a rock star."

Adams was a huge Pink Floyd fan. His official biography shares its name with "Wish You Were Here" and an excerpt of "Shine On You Crazy Diamond" was featured in the Hitchhiker's Guide radio series (this was cut from commercial releases). Pink Floyd also inspired the band Disaster Area from The Restaurant at the End of the Universe. (Note: Both bands are known for their outré live shows. Disaster Area crash a spaceship into a star as a concert stunt—a reference to Pink Floyd's 1968 song "Set the Controls for the Heart of the Sun". Like Pink Floyd's members, the frontman of Disaster Area was involved in a tax avoidance scheme.) Adams became good friends with the band, and for a 42nd birthday present, he was invited to play guitar with them live on stage at Earls Court. He suggested the title for their 1994 album The Division Bell from the lyrics to "High Hopes".

He was a devotee of Johann Sebastian Bach. He wrote: "Of the three greatest composers, Mozart tells us what it's like to be human, Beethoven tells us what it's like to be Beethoven and Bach tells us what it's like to be the universe." On Desert Island Discs, he chose three works by Bach, and his first choice was the Mass in B minor.

== Death ==
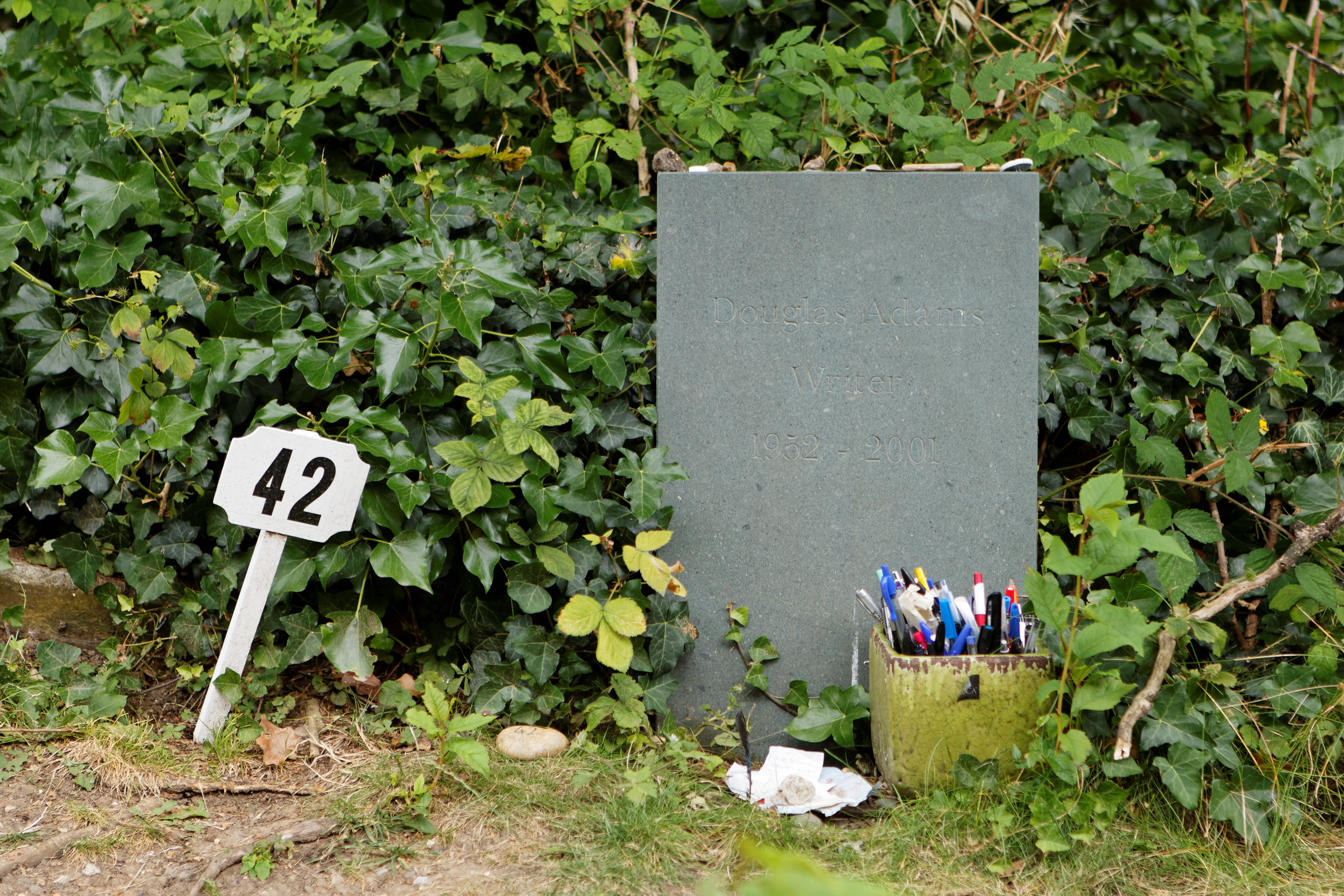
Adams's gravestone in Highgate Cemetery, North London, 2016

On 11 May 2001, Adams was resting from a workout at Platinum Fitness, a private gym in Santa Barbara, when he collapsed from a heart attack. He died the same morning at Santa Barbara Cottage Hospital, aged 49. Adams's funeral was held on 16 May in Santa Barbara. His ashes were interred in Highgate Cemetery, London, in June 2002. A memorial service was held on 17 September 2001 at St Martin-in-the-Fields in Trafalgar Square; it was the first church service broadcast online by the BBC.

== Legacy ==
On 9 May 2001, two days before Adams's death, the Minor Planet Center announced that asteroid 18610 Arthurdent had been named after the protagonist of The Hitchhiker's Guide to the Galaxy. In 2005, the asteroid 25924 Douglasadams was named in his memory. Two species have been named after Adams: Arenivaga adamsi, a species of sand cockroach, and Dravidogecko douglasadamsi, a small, nocturnal gecko.

On 25 May 2001, two weeks after Adams's death, his fans organised an annual tribute known as Towel Day. Travessa Douglas Adams, a street in São José, Brazil, is named in Adams's honour. Since 2003, Save the Rhino have held the annual Douglas Adams Memorial Lectures to raise money for environmental campaigns. In 2018, John Lloyd presented an episode of the BBC Radio Four documentary Archive on 4 discussing Adams's private papers held at St John's College.

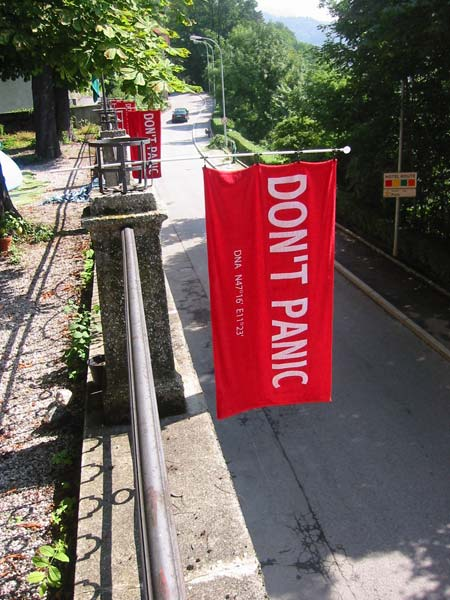
Towel Day 2005 in Innsbruck, Austria; In the Hitchhiker's Guide novels, a towel is the most useful thing a space traveller can have. The first annual Towel Day was celebrated on 25 May 2001, two weeks after Adams's death.

=== Posthumously-published works ===
The Salmon of Doubt (2002) contains various essays, speeches and short stories by Adams, as well as ten chapters of an unfinished Dirk Gently novel. In 2023, Unbound published 42: The Wildly Improbable Ideas of Douglas Adams, a collection of Adams's notes and essays edited by Kevin Jon Davies.

For almost two decades, Adams attempted to adapt The Hitchhiker's Guide to the Galaxy into a feature film. He was approached by a film producer as early as 1979. Ivan Reitman was involved as a producer in 1982; he left the project over creative differences with Adams. The film's development was affected by Adams's desire for both creative control and a large budget, though he had no problem with Americanising certain elements. (Note: Adams unhappily described one Hollywood team's pitch for the film as "Star Wars with jokes". However he had no problem with an American actor being cast as Ford Prefect. Ultimately, American Yasiin Bey (formerly known as Mos Def) was cast as Prefect in the 2005 film.) A film deal with Disney was agreed on 1997. Adams and his family moved to Montecito, California, in 1999 when the film was close to being made, but it remained in development hell. In 2000, he likened the Hollywood process to "trying to grill a steak by having a succession of people coming into the room and breathing on it". The feature film adaptation, directed by Garth Jennings, was finally released in April 2005. The screenplay is credited to Adams and Karey Kirkpatrick.

==== Adaptations ====
14 million copies of Hitchhiker's Guide books had been sold worldwide by the time of Adams's death. Adams had plans for a sixth book to conclude the series, noting that Mostly Harmless was "a bleak book. I would love to finish Hitchhiker on a slightly more upbeat note, so five seems to be a wrong kind of number, six is a better kind of number." After his death, his estate selected Eoin Colfer to write a sixth and final book in the series, And Another Thing... (2009).

Adams and radio producer Dirk Maggs planned, as early as 1993, to create further radio series based on the third, fourth and fifth Hitchhiker's novels. This was realised only after Adams's death. The Tertiary, Quandary and Quintessential Phases of the radio series were broadcast from September 2004 to June 2005, with most of the original cast reprising their roles. With the aid of a recording of Adams reading Life, the Universe and Everything, he posthumously voices the character Agrajag. The final episode of the fifth series was dedicated to Adams. A sixth radio series, broadcast in 2018, was based on both And Another Thing... and Adams's unpublished material.

Adams declined lucrative offers to novelise his Doctor Who scripts and did not allow others to do so in his lifetime. Shada was novelised by Gareth Roberts in 2012, and City of Death and The Pirate Planet by James Goss in 2015 and 2017 respectively. Doctor Who and the Krikkitmen was novelised by Goss in 2018. In 2003, Shada was adapted into a webcast and audio drama starring Paul McGann. A partially animated reconstruction of Shada voiced by the original cast was released in 2017.

The Dirk Gently series was adapted into a BBC Radio 4 series (2007–2008) starring Harry Enfield, (Note: A third radio series based on The Salmon of Doubt was commissioned, but was cancelled by Adams's estate in 2009 as "there was not enough of Douglas" in the project.) a BBC television series (2010–2012) starring Stephen Mangan and a BBC America television series (2016–2017) starring Samuel Barnett.

=== Technology ===
"People think [Hitchhiker's is] some kind of vision of the future which it isn't. I'm not in the field of predictive science fiction... essentially it's got its feet probably more firmly planted in the area of satire and social comedy, I guess, than science fiction. But at the same time, I mean, inadvertently, [the fictional Hitchhiker's Guide to the Galaxy] turns out to be tremendously like where PDAs are going."

— Adams during one of his last interviews in May 2001

Adams's fiction (and non-fiction) work has predicted future technology, though this was not always his intention. Both Adams and critics have noted that the fictional Hitchhiker's Guide to the Galaxy, which takes the form of a digital handheld device, forecasted personal digital assistants and smartphones.

Adams was highly regarded by the generation of Silicon Valley technologists who had grown up with his work. Yahoo's Babel Fish translation service is named after Adams's fictional creature which translates languages. Chess-playing computers Deep Thought and Deep Blue were named after the fictional Deep Thought supercomputer. Google's AI research laboratory DeepMind was also named in homage. Elon Musk called the writer the "best philosopher ever", and in 2018 he launched a Tesla car into space with a copy of The Hitchhiker's Guide in its glovebox. Musk stated that the Grok chatbot is inspired by the fictional guide book. The Wall Street Journal also compared Eddie, the annoyingly upbeat AI from The Hitchhiker's Guide to the Galaxy, to AI chatbots. UAE AI company G42 was named after Adams’s comical answer to "life, the universe and everything".

== Awards and nominations ==
Year	Award	Work	Category	Result	Notes	Ref.
1978	Imperial Tobacco Awards for Radio	The Hitchhiker's Guide to the Galaxy	Light Entertainment	Won		
1979	Hugo Award	The Hitchhiker's Guide to the Galaxy	Best Dramatic Presentation	Nominated	Shared with Geoffrey Perkins	
1980	Pye Radio Awards	The Hitchhiker's Guide to the Galaxy	Programme, or series of programmes, for young listeners	Won		
1983	Inkpot Award	—N/a	—N/a	Won		
1983	Best of Young British Novelists	—N/a	—N/a	Nominated		

Adams was inducted into the Radio Academy's UK Radio Hall of Fame.

== Works ==
Novels

- The Hitchhiker's Guide to the Galaxy (1979)
- The Restaurant at the End of the Universe (1980)
- Life, the Universe and Everything (1982)
- So Long, and Thanks for All the Fish (1984)
- Dirk Gently's Holistic Detective Agency (1987)
- The Long Dark Tea-Time of the Soul (1988)
- Mostly Harmless (1992)

Short stories

- "The Private Life of Genghis Khan" (1986)
- "A Christmas Fairly Story" (1986)
- "Young Zaphod Plays It Safe" (1986)

Other books

- The Meaning of Liff (with John Lloyd; 1983)
- The Deeper Meaning of Liff (with John Lloyd; 1990)
- Last Chance to See (with Mark Carwardine; 1990)

== Notes ==
Preceded by Anthony Read	Doctor Who script editor 1979–80	Succeeded by Christopher H. Bidmead
