= Books and Bookmen =

Literary magazine

- The cover picture for the March 1980 issue was a caricature of W. H. Auden.
- Editor: Frank Granville Barker: Michael Barber; Cis Amaral; Sally Emerson
- Frequency: Monthly
- First issue: 1955
- Final issue: 1986
- Company: Hansom
- Country: United Kingdom
- Based in: London
- Language: English
- ISSN: 0006-744X
- OCLC: 1536799

Books and Bookmen was a literary magazine founded in 1955 by publisher Philip Dossé. It was known for the vigour of its writers, especially the vituperative Auberon Waugh.

The magazine had six stablemates, Art and Artists, Dance and Dancers, Films and Filming, Music and Musicians, Plays and Players, and Records and Recording.

The publishing company, Hansom Books, folded in 1980 and the magazine was then relaunched under new management in the following year and continued publication until 1986.

== Contributors ==
In addition to Auberon Waugh, contributors to this magazine included:

- Sir Harold Acton
- Tariq Ali
- Lord Boothby
- Melvyn Bragg
- Prince Charles
- Richard Crossman
- Terry Eagleton
- Hans Eysenck
- Paul Foot
- J. K. Galbraith
- Richard Ingrams
- Cecil King
- Jonathan Meades
- Lady Diana Mosley
- Enoch Powell
- A. L. Rowse
- Colin Wilson
