= Douglas Adams Memorial Lectures =

Series of annual lectures in honour of Douglas Adams

The Douglas Adams Memorial Lecture is a lecture series held annually in honour of English author and screenwriter Douglas Adams. Started in 2003, it is held in support of environmental charities, such as Save the Rhino International, with topics ranging from science to exploration, conservation and comedy. The event is traditionally held around Adams’ birthday on 11 March and currently takes place at The Royal Geographical Society.

The Douglas Adams Memorial Lecture returned in 2021 after a break of 4 years. It was held online due to the COVID-19 lockdown and included short film Socially Distanced Dirk based on the Netflix series Dirk Gently's Holistic Detective Agency featuring actors Samuel Barnett and Hannah Marks.

Since 2021 the lecture has been hosted by comedian Rachel Wheeley with typically two guest speakers.

== Douglas Adams Memorial Lecturer ==
Year	Name	Lecture title
2003	Richard Dawkins	Queerer than we can suppose: the strangeness of science
2004	Robert Swan	Mission Antarctica
2005	Mark Carwardine	Last Chance to See... Just a bit more
2006	Robert Winston	Is the Human an Endangered Species?
2007	Richard Leakey	Wildlife Management in East Africa – Is there a future?
2008	Steven Pinker	The Stuff of Thought, Language as a Window into Human Nature
2009	Benedict Allen	Unbreakable
2010	Marcus du Sautoy	42: the answer to life, the universe and prime numbers
2011	Brian Cox	The Universe and Why We Should Explore It
2012	Lecture replaced by "The Douglas Adams Party" at London's Hammersmith Apollo	
2013	Adam Rutherford	Creation: the origin and the future of life
2014	Roger Highfield and Simon Singh	The Science of Harry Potter and the Mathematics of The Simpsons
2015	Neil Gaiman	Immortality and Douglas Adams
2016	Alice Roberts	Survivors of the Ice Age
2021	Baroness Susan Greenfield	The Creative Mind: Insights into neuroscience
	Arvind Ethan David	On the Advisability of Writing Fan Mail
2022	Eleanor Jane Milner-Gulland	Finding Optimism in a Time of Biodiversity Crisis
	Fay Clark	Thanks For All The Fish! A Deep-dive into Dolphin Cognition
2023	Jim Al-Khalili	
	John Lloyd	
