= Films and Filming =

Magazine

- Categories: Film
- Frequency: Monthly
- First issue: 1954
- Final issue: 1990
- Company: Hansom Books
- Country: United Kingdom
- ISSN: 0015-167X

Films and Filming (1954–1980, 1981–1990) was a highly regarded monthly film journal that was, as well, the longest-running British periodical focused on a gay print audience prior to partial decriminalisation of homosexuality in England and Wales.

== History ==
Founded in October 1954 "from a dingy basement near Victoria Station in London", Films and Filming was a mainstream and internationally-respected film journal throughout the 1950s and 1960s, "[m]ore sophisticated than [a] fan magazin[e], but less intellectually demanding than the British Film Institute's Sight and Sound". Produced under the imprint of Hansom Books by publisher Philip Dosse (and a team of editors "almost exclusively gay"), it was part of that publisher's "distinguished portfolio of arts magazines on theatre, ballet, books and art, as well as film". Widely available in bookshops and newsagents, it was the most successful title of Hansom.

The magazine's film focus, its affordability, its esteemed writers—in 1966, editor Peter Baker added screenwriter David McGillivray as a regular columnist, "respected cinema journalist Robin Bean" added reviewer Peter Whitehead, and others contributing included "world-famous writers, directors and actors like Ingmar Bergman, Kenneth Tynan, Federico Fellini and... Lillian Gish" and "important critics like Raymond Durgnat and Gordon Gow"—its articles on gay-themed censorship in film and theatre, its gay-themed text and image content (e.g., on "sexually ambiguous... actors like Dirk Bogarde and Rock Hudson"), and its commercial and personal advertisements emphasising same-sex desire—these were, in the view of one scholar, key to its "appeal to many gay men" as well as Films and Filming's financial success.

Following the Sexual Offences Act 1967, when gay sex was partially decriminalised in England and Wales, the magazine was able to be more open and feature naked men on the cover. Its initial publication run continued through 1980, and after ceasing briefly, began again in 1981, and continued until publication ceased in 1990.

== See also ==
- Books and Bookmen
- Dance and Dancers
