= Ann Olga Koloski-Ostrow =

American archaeologist

Ann Olga Koloski-Ostrow (born 1949) is an American archaeologist known for her studies of hydraulic engineering in the ancient world. She works at Brandeis University as a professor of classical studies, the Kevy and Hortense Kaiserman Endowed Chair in the Humanities, and co-director of graduate studies in Ancient Greek and Roman Studies.

== Education ==
Koloski-Ostrow has a bachelor's degree from Upsala College in New Jersey, and a master's degree and Ph.D. from the University of Michigan.

== Books ==
Koloski-Ostrow's books include:

- The Archaeology of Sanitation in Roman Italy: Toilets, Sewers, and Water Systems (University of North Carolina Press, 2015)
- The Sarno Bath Complex: Architecture in Pompeii's Last Years (L'Erma di Bretschneider, 1990)

She is also an editor of volumes including:

- Roman Toilets: Their Archaeology and Cultural History (with Gemma Jansen and Eric Moormann, Peeters, 2011)
- Naked Truths: Women, Sexuality, and Gender in Classical Art and Archaeology (with Claire L. Lyons, Routledge, 1997)
