= Dance and Dancers =

Ballet magazine

- This is the first issue from the new publisher Brevet after the hiatus while Hansom was liquidated.
- Editor: Peter Williams; John Percival
- Categories: Dance
- Frequency: Monthly
- Total circulation (1950): 30,000
- First issue: 1950
- Final issue: 1995
- Company: Hansom, Brevet, Orpheus
- Country: United Kingdom
- Based in: London
- Language: English
- ISSN: 0011-5983

Dance and Dancers was a magazine about ballet. The magazine was founded in 1950 by publisher Philip Dosse and editor Peter Williams. John Percival edited the magazine from 1951 to 1995.

The publishing company, Hansom Books, folded in 1980 and the magazine was then relaunched under new management in the following year and continued publication until 1995.

Jan 1950. The first issue.

June–July 1980. The last issue from Hansom Books.

== See also ==
- Books and Bookmen
- Films and Filming
