= 18610 Arthurdent =

Asteroid

Discovery
- Discovered by: Starkenburg Obs.
- Discovery site: Starkenburg Obs.
- Discovery date: 7 February 1998

Designations
- Named after: Arthur Dent (The Hitchhiker's Guide to the Galaxy)
- Alternative designations: 1998 CC_{2} · 1990 EG_{3}
- Minor planet category: main-belt · (middle)

Orbital characteristics
- Epoch 4 September 2017 (JD 2458000.5)
- Uncertainty parameter 0
- Observation arc: 28.06 yr (10,248 days)
- Aphelion: 3.0932 AU
- Perihelion: 2.0018 AU
- Semi-major axis: 2.5475 AU
- Eccentricity: 0.2142
- Orbital period (sidereal): 4.07 yr (1,485 days)
- Mean anomaly: 321.77°
- Mean motion: 0° 14^{m} 32.64^{s} / day
- Inclination: 5.5878°
- Longitude of ascending node: 319.49°
- Argument of perihelion: 139.42°

Physical characteristics
- Dimensions: 3 km (est. at 0.25); 3.463±0.055 km
- Geometric albedo: 0.234±0.020
- Absolute magnitude (H): 14.4

18610 Arthurdent (provisional designation 1998 CC_{2}) is an asteroid from the middle region of the asteroid belt, approximately 3.5 kilometers in diameter. It was discovered on 7 February 1998, by a team of astronomers including Felix Hormuth at Starkenburg Observatory in Heppenheim, Germany. The asteroid was named after Arthur Dent from Douglas Adams's Hitchhiker's Guide to the Galaxy series.

== Orbit and classification ==
Arthurdent orbits the Sun in the central main-belt at a distance of 2.0–3.1 AU once every 4 years and 1 month (1,485 days). Its orbit has an eccentricity of 0.21 and an inclination of 6° with respect to the ecliptic. The first known precovery image was taken during the Digitized Sky Survey (DSS) at Palomar Observatory in 1988, extending the asteroid's observation arc by 10 years prior to its official discovery observation.

== Physical characteristics ==
=== Diameter and albedo ===
According to the survey carried out by NASA's Wide-field Infrared Survey Explorer with its subsequent NEOWISE mission, Arthurdent measures 3.5 kilometers in diameter and its surface has an albedo of 0.234. This agrees with a generic absolute magnitude-to-diameter conversion for a silicaceous asteroid (albedo of 0.25), which gives a diameter of approximately 3 kilometers for an absolute magnitude of 14.3.

=== Rotation period ===
As of 2017, the Arthurdent's composition, rotation period and shape remain unknown.

== Naming ==
This minor planet was named after Arthur Dent, the bewildered hero of Douglas Adams's radio play and book The Hitchhiker's Guide to the Galaxy. The naming of the asteroid was announced by the Minor Planet Center (MPC) in its Minor Planet Circular on 9 May 2001 (M.P.C. 42677). Two days later, Adams died of a heart attack in Santa Barbara, California.

=== Coincidence with death ===
The near coincidence of these events led to some media reports of the asteroid naming appearing after Adams's death was reported, and to assumptions that the two events occurred on the same day, even by those connected to the naming: on 14 May 2001, German amateur astronomer Reiner Stoss at the Starkenburg Observatory wrote: "You may have heard the sad news that Douglas Adams passed away last Friday. By accident on the same day the naming of minor planet (18610) Arthurdent was announced by the Minor Planet Center. We wanted to make Mr. Adams a joy, but did never dare to think that he wouldn't be able to receive this surprise, when we sent our name proposal to the MPC a few months back."
