= Peter Williams (dance critic) =

Peter Lancelot Williams (12 June 1914 – 10 August 1995) was an English designer and dance critic. He founded and edited the monthly magazine Dance and Dancers for thirty years, wrote columns for national newspapers and was an influential chairman of various committees and trusts.

== Early life ==
Williams was born on 12 June 1914 in Burton Joyce, a village near Nottingham. He was the son of Godfrey Williams, an army officer from a Cornish family who had been a Major in the 11th Hussars. At the age of seven, he saw Diaghilev's production of The Sleeping Beauty at the London Coliseum. This impressed him greatly, and he became a regular ballet-goer and fan of the ballerina Olga Spessivtseva.

He was educated at the famous Harrow School in north west London. He then studied design at the Central School of Arts and Crafts and, after graduating, established his own fashion design business in Ebury Street in 1934. This closed on the outbreak of World War II in 1939. His wartime service was as a transport officer in the family home in Cornwall at Perranarworthal. After the war, he became head designer at the UK subsidiary of the large swimwear company Jantzen.

In 1947, he executed his first costume sketches for Designs with Strings, a ballet being created by American choreographer John Taras for the Metropolitan Ballet, a short-lived, London-based company. He then designed for Michel Fokine's Prince Igor, also by the Metropolitan Ballet. For the Sadler's Wells Theatre Ballet, he did designs and the libretto for Andrée Howard's Selina.

== Dance writer and journalist ==
The first issue of Dance and Dancers

During this period, he became assistant editor of Ballet, a magazine established just before the war by critic Richard Buckle. He resigned in 1950 and then founded, designed and edited Dance and Dancers, the first of a family of arts magazines published by Philip Dosse. He edited the magazine for thirty years, mainly from his home in Eaton Square.

He was the dance critic for the Daily Mail newspaper from 1950 to 1953. He was then the deputy critic for the Sunday newspaper, The Observer, from 1970 and became its main critic in 1982.

Williams also wrote or edited a number of books and exhibition catalogues. Among them are Covent Garden: 25 Years of Opera and Ballet, Royal Opera House (London: Victoria and Albert Museum, 1971); Ballets et Danseurs dans le Monde: Photographs de Serge Lido, with Odon-Jerôme Lemaitre (Paris: Éditions Vilo, 1973); and 50 Years of Ballet Rambert, 1926–1976, with Clement Crisp and Anya Sainsbury (Ilkley, West Yorkshire: Scolar Press, 1976). His most important work of dance writing, however, is his book Masterpieces of Ballet Design (Oxford: Phaidon Press, 1981), an erudite and heavily illustrated discussion of the history of ballet stage décor.

== Committee man ==
As a regular critic for national newspapers, Williams became part of an influential circle. His political, diplomatic and writing skills then led to service on a number of national committees. For the Arts Council, he wrote the ballet portion of their 1969 plan, A Report on Opera and Ballet in the United Kingdom 1966–69, which resulted in the creation of regional companies such as the Northern Dance Theatre. He chaired the Arts Council's dance advisory committee from 1973 to 1980. He founded and chaired the Dancers' Pensions and Resettlement Fund from 1975 to 1992. He was chairman of the British Council's drama and dance committee from 1976 to 1981 which promoted foreign tours of British ballet companies.

== Honours ==
Williams was named an officer of the Most Excellent Order of the British Empire (OBE) in 1971. After his death in 1995, the Central School of St. Martin's College of Art and Design, London, established the Peter Williams Design for Dance Project in his memory.

== Personal traits and death ==
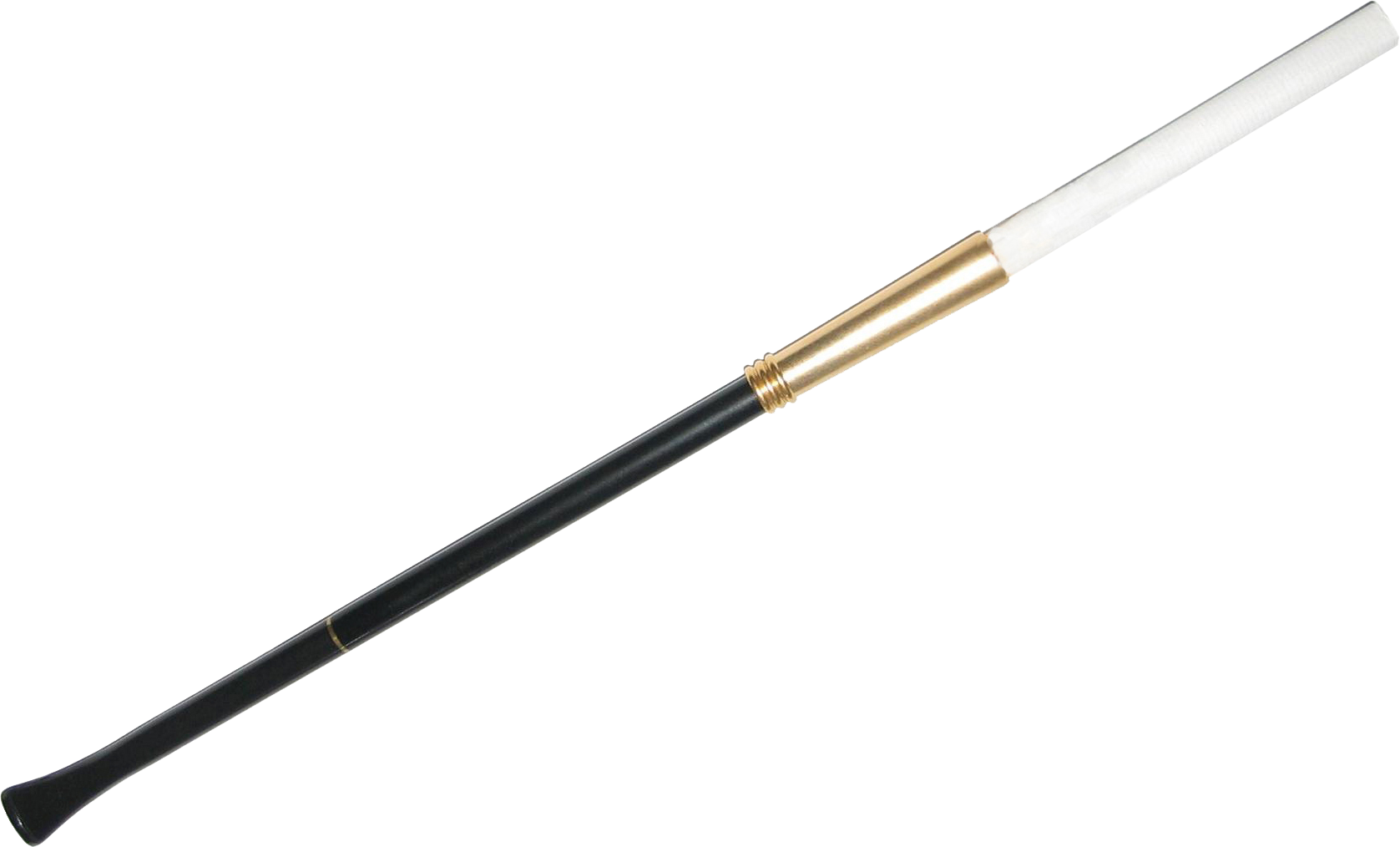
A cigarette holder

He was too tall to be a dancer himself, being six-foot by the age of twelve. He affected a languid, cosmopolitan style, smoking cigarettes such as Senior Service through a long cigarette holder, while his catchphrase was a drawled "awfully pretty". He did not marry.

He retired in 1990 but continued to attend the ballet. His final years were spent in a nursing home in St Clement, Cornwall where he died of a heart attack on 10 August 1995. His collection of papers and library of dance was left to the Laban Dance Centre and now forms part of the National Archives.
