= Anna Stothard =

British novelist, journalist and scriptwriter

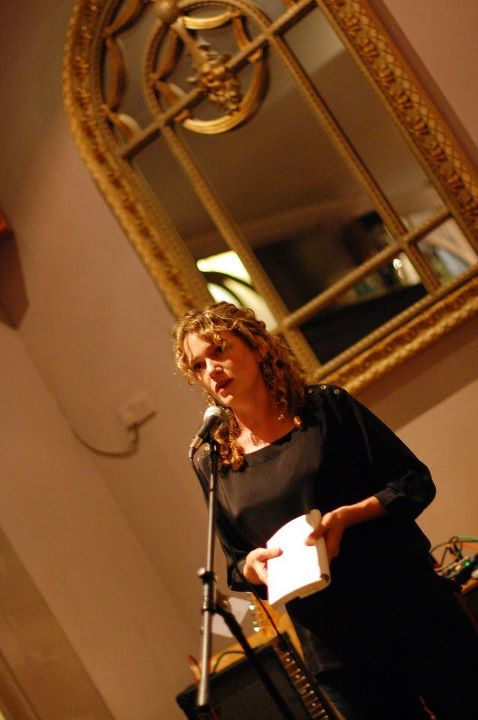
Stothard in 2011

Anna Stothard (born 1983), is a British novelist, journalist scriptwriter, and the daughter of Sally Emerson and Sir Peter Stothard.

== Writing history ==
Her first novel, Isabel and Rocco, (ISBN 0-09-944332-5), was published when she was 19. "Dazzling... remarkably accomplished," wrote The Observer. She has written for a number of newspapers, including columns for The Observer and The Sunday Telegraph.

She read English at Lincoln College, Oxford. Her first screenplay won a Scottish Screen and BBC Scotland Fast Forward Features prize. She was awarded a scholarship with the Masters programme at the American Film Institute, Los Angeles, which she attended until 2008.

Her second novel, The Pink Hotel, was longlisted for the 2012 Orange Prize.
