= Stuttgart Observatory =

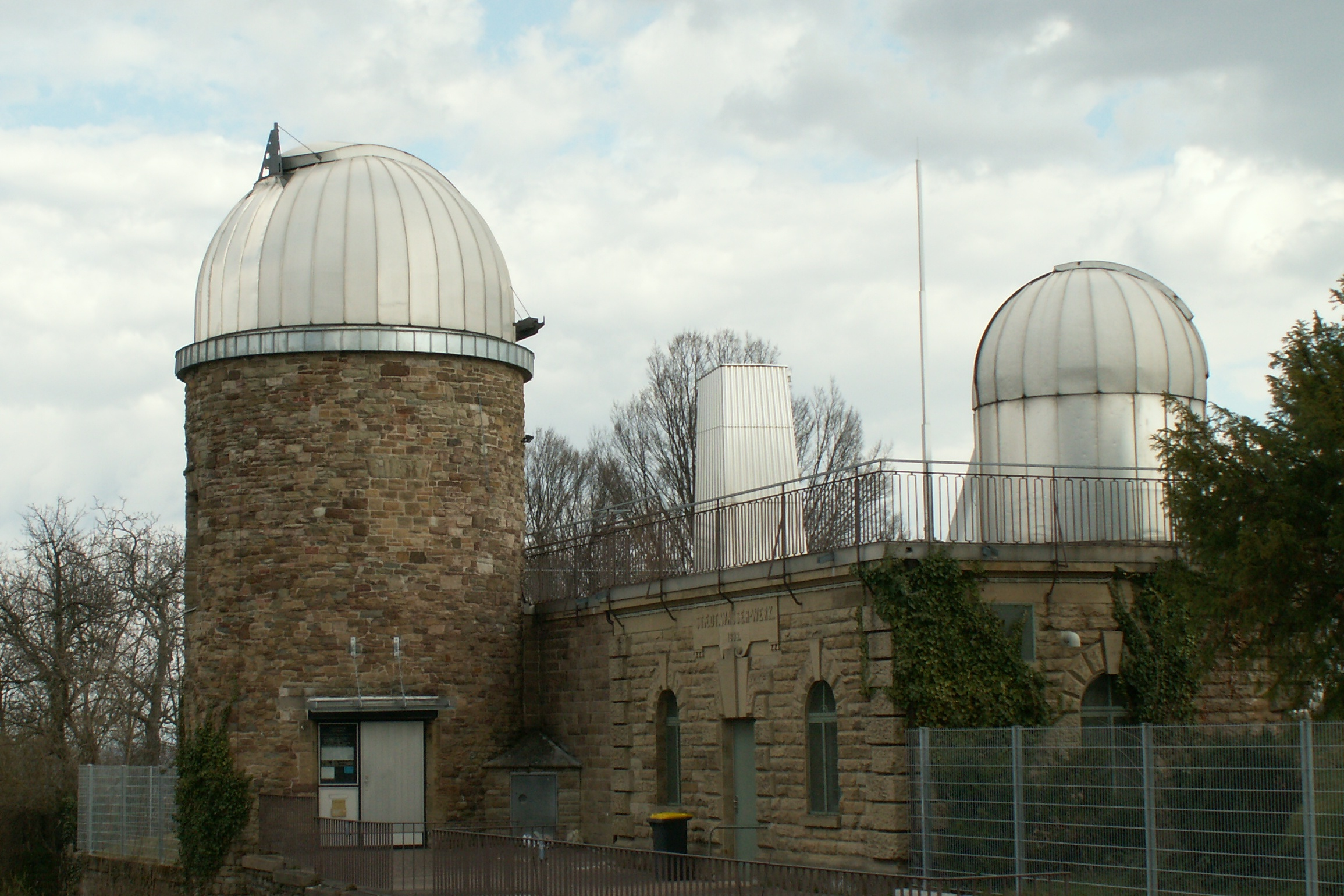
- Stuttgart Observatory
- Observatory code: 025
- Location: Stuttgart, Baden-Württemberg, Germany
- Coordinates: 48°46′57″N 9°11′47″E
- Altitude: 351.1 m (1,152 ft)
- Established: 1919
- Website: www.sternwarte.de/english.html
- Location of Stuttgart Observatory
- Related media on Commons

Stuttgart Observatory (German: Sternwarte Stuttgart; MPC 025) is an astronomical observatory owned and operated by the volunteer association Schwäbische Sternwarte e.V. It is located on the hill Uhlandshöhe in Stuttgart, Germany.

The Observatory is accessible to the public since 1922.

== History ==
On the Initiative of the astronomer and author Robert Henseling, the astronomic association Schwäbische Sternwarte e.V. was founded in 1919. The purposes for the newfound association were, and still are, to spread and explain astronomical knowledge to a broad public and to provide support for the Planetarium Stuttgart.

To gather enough monetary funds for the construction of the Observatory at the site it still is today, even such famous guest speakers as Albert Einstein followed the invitation to give a speech about astronomy and donate the revenue to the Schwäbische Sternwarte e.V.. The construction of the observatory, designed by Wilhelm Jost, took place in 1921. Already in early January 1922 the association started operations at the new observatory. During World War II, all activities at the observatory were suspended, only to be resumed in September 1947.

On November 10, 2015, large parts of the observatory, including the library and a lecture hall, were destroyed by arson. The observatory was extensively renovated and has been open for public tours again since April 2018.

== Instruments ==
The observatory is equipped with six telescopes, four of which are permanently mounted. The two others may be assembled if necessary.

Inside the bigger of the observatory's two astrodomes, the oldest of the six telescopes is attached to a mount reaching down to the bottom of the tower. This device is a 7-inch Zeiss telescope with 2.59-metre focal-length from 1911, one of the last still existent.

Another 7-inch refractor of newer design, a special H-alpha telescope and a 16-inch Newtonian telescope are located in separate sheds on the terrace between the two astrodomes. The latter telescope is frequently used by the members of the association for their scientific research – predominantly the observation of star occultations by minor planets. The results are sent to a Japanese institute. For observations made by the Stuttgart Observatory concerning occultations, the observatory code given by the Minor Planet Center is 025.

== See also ==
- List of astronomical observatories
