= Hansom Books =

Publisher

Hansom Books was a British publisher founded in 1947 by Philip Dosse to produce the magazine Dance and Dancers. Magazines in a similar format were then founded to cover mainly other performing artforms, all seven magazines eventually being known as the Seven Arts Group. The other titles were Art and Artists, Books and Bookmen, Films and Filming, Music and Musicians, Plays and Players, and Records and Recording.

In 1956, the young Australian journalist Val Wake worked for Plays and Players as a junior play reviewer. The editor at the time was Frank Granville Barker. Another Australian, Evan Senior, was editor of Music and Musicians. At the time the editorial team for all six titles was accommodated in the basement of a building near Victoria Station, London. Each title had its own desk. Wake was courting his future wife, Canadian-born Lillian Louise Lequereux, at the time, and was able to take his girlfriend to many of the fringe theatre events taking place in London, at no cost to him; Lequereux was impressed. None of Wake's published reviews seemed to have survived and none of the plays he reviewed did either.

The group went bankrupt in 1980 and Dosse then died by suicide. The publications were sold and publication continued.
