= Life, the Universe and Everything =

1982 novel by Douglas Adams

- First edition (UK)
- Author: Douglas Adams
- Cover artist: David Scutt (UK)
- Language: English
- Series: The Hitchhiker's Guide to the Galaxy
- Genre: Comic science fiction
- Publisher: Pan Books (UK); Harmony Books (US)
- Publication date: August 1982
- Publication place: United Kingdom
- Pages: 160 (UK Paperback)
- ISBN: 0-330-26738-8
- OCLC: 51000970
- Preceded by: The Restaurant at the End of the Universe
- Followed by: So Long, and Thanks for All the Fish

Life, the Universe and Everything (1982, ISBN 0-345-39182-9) is the third book in the six-volume Hitchhiker's Guide to the Galaxy science fiction "trilogy of six books" by British writer Douglas Adams. The title refers to the Answer to Life, the Universe, and Everything.

The story was originally outlined by Adams as Doctor Who and the Krikkitmen to be a Tom Baker Doctor Who television six-part story, but was rejected by the BBC. It was later considered as a plotline for the second series of the Hitchhiker's TV series, which was never commissioned.

A radio adaptation of Life, the Universe and Everything was recorded in 2003 under the guidance of Dirk Maggs, starring the surviving members of the cast of the original Hitchhiker's radio series. Adams himself, at his own suggestion, makes a cameo appearance; due to his death before production began on the series, this was achieved by sampling his character's dialogue from an audio book of the novel read by Adams that was published in the 1990s. The radio adaptation debuted on BBC Radio 4 in September 2004.

== Plot summary ==
After being stranded on pre-historic Earth after the events in The Restaurant at the End of the Universe, Arthur Dent is met by his old friend Ford Prefect, who drags him into a space-time eddy, represented by an anachronistic sofa. The two end up at Lord's Cricket Ground two days before the Earth's destruction by the Vogons. Shortly after they arrive, a squad of robots land in a spaceship in the middle of the field and attack the assembled crowd, stealing the Ashes before departing. Another spaceship arrives, the Starship Bistromath, helmed by Slartibartfast, who discovers he is too late to stop the theft and requests Arthur and Ford's help.

As they travel to their next destination, Slartibartfast explains that he is trying to stop the robots from collecting all the components of the Wikkit Gate. Long ago, the peaceful population of the planet of Krikkit, unaware of the rest of the Universe due to a dust cloud that surrounded its solar system, were surprised to find the wreckage of a spacecraft on their planet. Reverse engineering the vessel, they explored past the dust cloud and saw the rest of the Universe, immediately taking a disliking to it and deciding that it must be destroyed. They built a fleet of ships and robots to attack the rest of the Universe in a brutal onslaught known as the Krikkit Wars, but were eventually defeated. Realizing that the Krikkit population would not be satisfied alongside the existence of the rest of the Universe, it was decided to lock the planet in a Slo-Time envelope, to be opened only after the Universe has ended so that the planet can exist alone. The Wikkit Gate, shaped exactly like a wicket used in the sport of cricket, is needed to unlock the envelope. However, one ship carrying a troop of robots from Krikkit avoided being sealed in, and these robots began to search for the pieces of the Gate after they were dispersed about space and time.

Slartibartfast, Arthur, and Ford transport to an airborne party that has lasted numerous generations where another Gate component, the Silver Bail, is to be found, but Arthur finds himself separated from the others and ends up at a Cathedral of Hate created by a being called Agrajag. Agrajag reveals that he has been reincarnated countless times in a wide variety of forms, only to be killed by Arthur in each life; he now plans to kill Arthur in revenge. However, upon learning that Arthur has yet to cause his death at a place called Stavromula Beta, Agrajag realizes that he has pulled Arthur out of his relative timeline too soon and that killing him now would cause a paradox, but attempts to kill Arthur anyway. In his insanity, Agrajag brings the Cathedral down around them. Arthur manages to escape unharmed, partially due to learning how to fly after falling and missing the ground while catching sight of a bag he had lost at a Greek airport years before. After collecting the bag, Arthur inadvertently comes across the flying party and rejoins his friends. Inside, they find Trillian, but they are too late to stop the robots from stealing the Silver Bail. Arthur, Ford, Trillian, and Slartibartfast return to the Bistromath and try to head off the robots activating the Wikkit Gate.

Meanwhile, the Krikkit robots steal the last two pieces, the Infinite Improbability Drive core from the spaceship Heart of Gold and a peg leg used by Marvin the Paranoid Android. They capture both Marvin and Zaphod Beeblebrox in the process.

The Bistromath arrives too late to stop the robots from opening the Gate, so its occupants transport to the planet to attempt to negotiate with the Krikkit people. To their surprise, they find that the people seem to lack any desire to continue the war, and are directed to the robot and spaceship facilities in orbit about the planet. With help from Zaphod and Marvin, the group is able to infiltrate the facilities. Trillian deduces that the Krikkiters have been manipulated, reasoning that the people of Krikkit could not simultaneously be smart enough to develop their ultimate weapon—a bomb that could destroy every star in the universe—and also stupid enough not to realize that this weapon would also destroy them.

The characters discover that the true force behind the war has been the supercomputer Hactar. Previously built to serve a war-faring species, Hactar was tasked to build a supernova-bomb that would link the cores of every sun in the Universe together at the press of a button and cause the end of the Universe. Hactar purposely created a dud version of the weapon instead, causing his creators to pulverize him into dust, which thus became the dust cloud around Krikkit. However, Hactar was still able to function, though at a much weaker level. Trillian and Arthur speak to Hactar in a virtual space that he creates for them to explain himself. Hactar reveals that he spent eons creating the spaceship that crashed on Krikkit to inspire their xenophobia and incite them to go to war, also influencing their thoughts. However, when the Slo-Time envelope was activated, his control on the population waned. As he struggles to remain functional, Hactar apologizes to Trillian and Arthur for his actions before they leave for their ship.

With the war over, the group collects the core of the Heart of Gold and the Ashes, the only two components of the Wikkit Gate not destroyed by the robots, and returns Zaphod and Marvin to the Heart of Gold. Returning to Lord's Cricket Ground only moments after the robots' attack, Arthur attempts to return the Ashes, but is suddenly inspired to bowl one shot at a wicket that is being defended using a cricket ball in his bag. However, during his run-up, Arthur suddenly realizes that the ball was created and placed in his bag by Hactar and is actually the working version of the cosmic-supernova-bomb, and that the defender of the wicket is one of the Krikkit robots, ready to detonate the bomb once thrown. Arthur trips, misses the ground, and flies over the pitch, allowing him to throw the bomb safely aside and behead the robot with its own bat.

Afterward, the group are taking Arthur to a 'quiet and idyllic planet' when they come across a half-mad journalist. Some time earlier, he had been reporting on a court case in which a witness named Prak was inadvertently given an overdose of a truth drug. Prak began to tell all truth, horrifying the involved parties so badly that they abandoned the courtroom and sealed it up with him inside. The group find him still there, hoping to learn from him the Ultimate Question of Life, the Universe and Everything. They are disappointed to find that Prak has told all the truth in existence, but has forgotten it and kept no record. The only information he can provide is that the Ultimate Question and its answer can never both be known about in the same universe. He then attempts to tell Arthur where God's last message to His creation is, though he dies seemingly before Arthur is able to memorize the location.

Arthur ultimately settles on Krikkit, where he becomes a more skillful flier and learns bird language. He is briefly interrupted by the arrival of an immortal alien who has made it his goal to insult every living creature in the universe, but the alien realizes that he has already done so with Arthur on prehistoric Earth.

== Origins ==
The creation of Krikkit originally comes from Doctor Who and the Krikkitmen, a film treatment of the Doctor Who series. The treatment did not get far and was eventually scrapped. Elements of Doctor Who and the Krikkitmen were put into Life, the Universe and Everything. According to Nick Webb, the writer of Adams's official biography, he claimed that "Douglas's view of the Krikkitmen would be similar to his view of people who resolutely decline to learn what science can tell us about the universe we inhabit."

== References to the sport of cricket ==
Several of the names and items in the story are references to (or puns on) terms associated with the sport of cricket, with the effect that the sport is jokingly portrayed as having cosmic antiquity and significance. These include the name of the sport itself ("Krikkit"), the wicket with its three pillars and two bails, the ball, and the Ashes.

== Censorship ==
This book is the only one in the Hitchhiker's Guide to the Galaxy series to have been censored in its US edition. The word "asshole" is replaced with the word "kneebiter", and the word "shit" is replaced with "swut". One example of censorship is in Chapter 22, in which the UK edition mentions that the "Rory" is an award for "The Most Gratuitous Use of the Word 'Fuck' in a Serious Screenplay". In the US edition, this was changed to "Belgium" and padded with a digression about the alleged cathartic utilization of off-color words (thereby allowing Adams to poke fun at the concept of censorship itself); and the text from the original radio series described "Belgium" as the most offensive word used in the galaxy.

== Audiobook adaptations ==
There have been three audiobook recordings of the novel. The first was an abridged edition, recorded in 1984 by Stephen Moore, who played the voice of Marvin the Paranoid Android in the radio series, LP adaptations and in the TV series. In 1990, Adams himself recorded an unabridged edition, later re-released by New Millennium Audio in the United States and available from BBC Audiobooks in the United Kingdom. In 2006, actor Martin Freeman, who had played Arthur Dent in the 2005 movie, recorded a new unabridged edition of the audiobook. Stephen Moore and Douglas Adams used the uncensored UK edition of the text, while both the censored and uncensored versions of the book are available read by Freeman, depending on where they are purchased.
