= Slartibartfast =

Character from The Hitchhiker's Guide to the Galaxy

- Richard Vernon as Slartibartfast in the 1981 TV series. Vernon first played the character on radio in 1978 and on the subsequent LP rerecording of the first radio series.
- First appearance: Fit the Third (radio)
- Created by: Douglas Adams
- Portrayed by: Richard Vernon (radio and TV); Richard Griffiths (radio); Bill Nighy (film)

In-universe information
- Species: Magrathean
- Gender: Male

Slartibartfast is a character in The Hitchhiker's Guide to the Galaxy, a comedy/science fiction series created by Douglas Adams. The character appears in the first and third novels, the first and third radio series (and the LP adaptation of the first radio series), the 1981 television series, and the 2005 feature film. The character was modelled after actor John Le Mesurier.

== Character overview ==
Slartibartfast is a Magrathean and a designer of planets. His favourite part of the job is creating coastlines, the most notable of which are the fjords found on the coast of Norway on planet Earth, for which he won an award. Whilst they are trapped on prehistoric Earth, Arthur Dent and Ford Prefect see Slartibartfast's signature deep inside a glacier in ancient Norway.

When Earth Mk. II is being made, Slartibartfast is assigned to the continent of Africa. He is unhappy about this because he has already started "doing it with fjords again" (arguing that they give a continent a lovely baroque feel), but has been told by his superiors that they are "not equatorial enough." In relation to this, he expresses the view that he would "far rather be happy than right any day."

In any event, the new Earth is not required and, much to Slartibartfast's disgust, its owners suggest that he take a quick skiing holiday on his glaciers before dismantling them.

Slartibartfast's aircar is later found near the place where Zaphod Beeblebrox, Ford Prefect, Trillian and Arthur Dent are attacked by cops, who are suddenly killed in a way similar to how the cleaning staff in Slartibartfast's study have perished. There is a note pointing to one of the controls in the aircar saying "This is probably the best button to press."

In Life, the Universe and Everything Slartibartfast has joined the Campaign for Real Time (or "CamTim" as the volunteers casually refer to it, a reference to CAMRA) which tries to preserve events as they happened before time travelling was invented. He picks up Arthur and Ford from Lord's Cricket Ground with his Starship Bistromath, after which they head out to stop the robots of Krikkit from bringing together the pieces of the Wikkit Gate.

== Origin of name ==
Douglas Adams wrote in the notes accompanying the published volume of original radio scripts that he wanted Slartibartfast's name to sound very rude, but still actually be broadcastable. He therefore started with the name "Phartiphukborlz", and changed bits of it until it would be acceptable to the BBC. He came closer to achieving this goal in the following episode, with the double-act Lunkwill and Fook. He adds to this statement in Don't Panic: The Official Hitchhiker's Guide to the Galaxy Companion, an analysis by Neil Gaiman:

One thing I don't think I explained in the script book was that I was also teasing the typist, Geoffrey [Perkins]'s secretary, because ... she'd be typing out this long and extraordinary name which would be quite an effort to type and right at the beginning he says 'My name is not important, and I'm not going to tell you what it is'. I was just being mean to Geoffrey's secretary.

== Portrayals ==
Slartibartfast was first portrayed in the 1978 radio serial, in which he was voiced by Richard Vernon, who also portrayed him in the 1981 live-action miniseries. Richard Griffiths voiced him in the 2004 radio series. He was portrayed by Bill Nighy in the 2005 film adaptation of the first novel.
