= Marvin the Paranoid Android =

Fictional robot in The Hitchhiker's Guide to the Galaxy

- The Hitchhiker's Guide to the Galaxy character
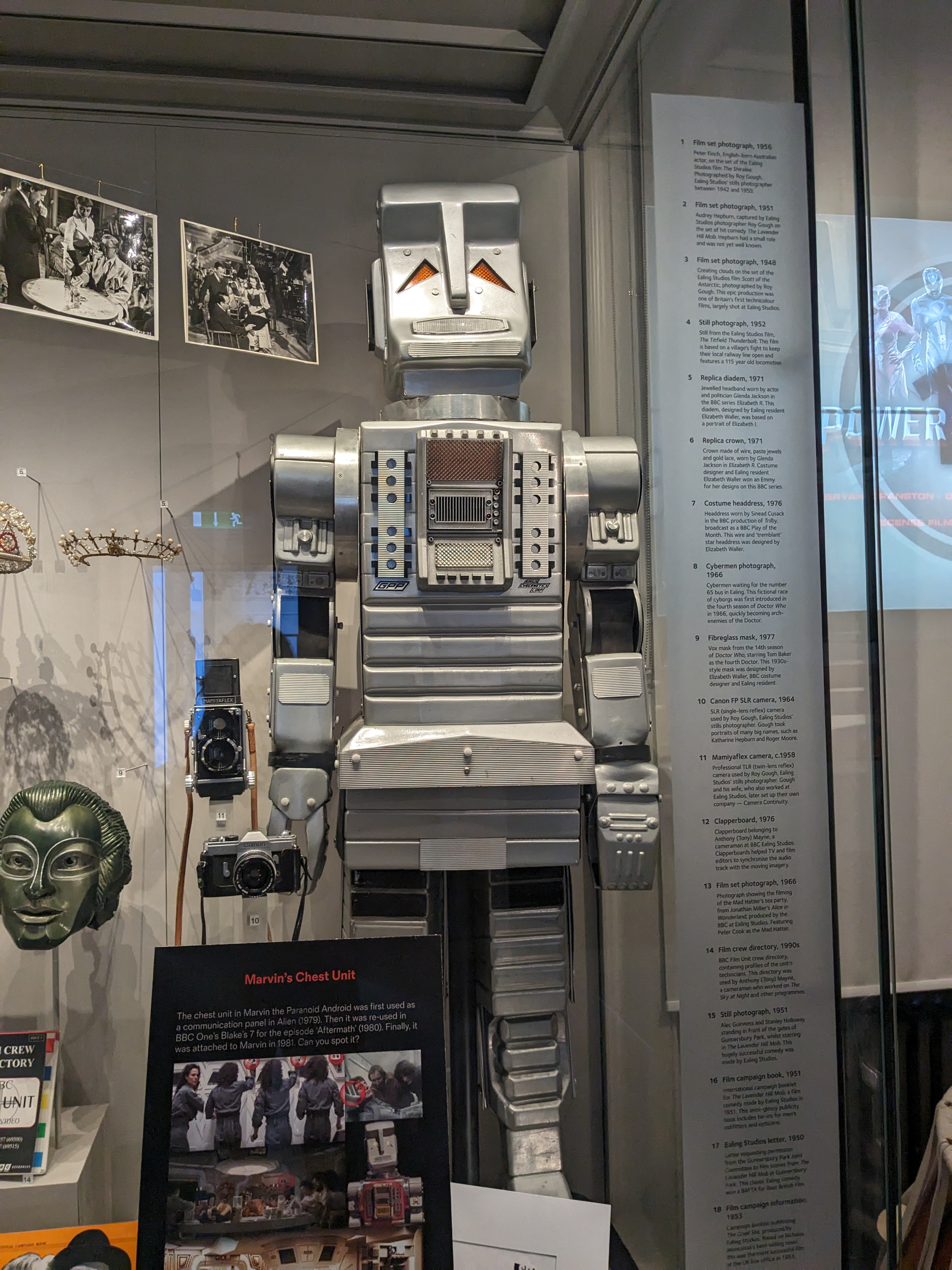
- Costume used in the TV series, on display at Gunnersbury Park Museum in 2023
- First appearance: Fit the Second (1978)
- Last appearance: Fit the Twenty-Sixth (2005)
- Created by: Douglas Adams
- Portrayed by: David Learner (television); Warwick Davis (film)
- Voiced by: Stephen Moore (radio and TV); Jim Broadbent (2018 radio series); Alan Rickman (film)

In-universe information
- Gender: Male design
- Occupation: Servant

Marvin the Paranoid Android is a fictional character in The Hitchhiker's Guide to the Galaxy series by Douglas Adams. Marvin is the ship's robot aboard the starship Heart of Gold. Originally built as one of many failed prototypes of Sirius Cybernetics Corporation's GPP (Genuine People Personalities) technology, Marvin is afflicted with severe depression and boredom, in part because he has a "brain the size of a planet" which he is seldom, if ever, given the chance to use. Instead, the crew request him merely to carry out mundane jobs such as "opening the door". Indeed, the true horror of Marvin's existence is that no task he could be given would occupy even the tiniest fraction of his vast intellect. Marvin claims he is 50,000 times more intelligent than a human (or 30 billion times more intelligent than a live mattress), though this is, if anything, an underestimation. When kidnapped by the bellicose Krikkit robots and tied to the interfaces of their intelligent war computer, Marvin simultaneously manages to plan the entire planet's military strategy, solve "all of the major mathematical, physical, chemical, biological, sociological, philosophical, etymological, meteorological and psychological problems of the Universe, except his own, three times over", and compose several lullabies.

== Name ==
According to Douglas Adams, "Marvin came from Andrew Marshall. He's another comedy writer, and he's exactly like that." (Indeed, in one of the early drafts for Hitchhiker's, the robot was called Marshall. It was changed to "Marvin" partly to avoid causing offence, but also because it was pointed out to Adams that on radio the name would sound like "Martial", which would have undesirable military connotations.) However, Adams also admitted that Marvin is part of a long line of literary depressives, such as A. A. Milne's Eeyore or Jacques in Shakespeare's As You Like It, and even owes something to Adams's own periods of depression.

Marvin does not actually display any signs of paranoia, though Zaphod Beeblebrox refers to him as "the Paranoid Android". Nor does he show any signs of mania, though Ford refers to him as a "manically depressed robot". He merely remains consistently morose throughout. In fact, he exhibits remarkable stoicism, being willing to wait hundreds of millions of years for his employers to come.

== Radio and TV series ==
According to his autobiography read in the Secondary Phase of the radio series, Marvin was constructed, much against his own wishes, by the Sirius Cybernetics Corporation to prototype human personality artificial intelligence. In his own words:

I didn't ask to be made: no one consulted me or considered my feelings in the matter. I don't think it even occurred to them that I might have feelings. After I was made, I was left in a dark room for six months... and me with this terrible pain in all the diodes down my left side. I called for succour in my loneliness, but did anyone come? Did they hell. My first and only true friend was a small rat. One day it crawled into a cavity in my right ankle and died. I have a horrible feeling it's still there...

— Douglas Adams, from Fit the Twelfth (radio series)

The cutaway illustration of Marvin made by Kevin J. Davies for the "Depreciation Society" featured a "rat cavity".

As the menial labourer on the Heart of Gold spaceship, he grew immensely resentful of the insistence of his new masters (Zaphod Beeblebrox and Trillian; later also Ford Prefect and Arthur Dent) that he open doors, check airlocks and pick up pieces of paper. He reserved a particular contempt for the sentient doors, despising their blissful satisfaction with existence.

When the Heart of Gold crew arrive on the ancient planet of Magrathea, they abandon Marvin on the surface. During an apparently suicidal confrontation with a pair of trigger-happy cops, the crew are teleported directly from Magrathea into the future to the Restaurant at the End of the Universe to find that, in fact, they have not travelled at all. The Restaurant was constructed on the ruins of the planet they had just left, and, while there, they find Marvin, who had been waiting patiently for their return for 576,000,003,579 years (he counted them). According to Marvin, "The first ten million years were the worst, and the second ten million years, they were the worst too. The third ten million I didn't enjoy at all. After that I went into a bit of a decline." Apparently, the best conversation he had was over 40 million years ago with a coffee machine.

Deciding they had better leave, the crew make a desperate and futile attempt to engage Marvin's enthusiasm (he "hasn't got one") before he simply does what they really want and opens the door to the ship they want to steal. The ship turns out to be a Haggunenon battle cruiser, and the entire group, including Marvin, but excluding Ford Prefect and Arthur Dent, who escape, are eaten by its crew. Marvin's subsequent survival is never explained, but against all probability, he eventually finds himself on Ursa Minor Beta, just in time to rescue Zaphod from a robotic tank.

A subsequent section of Marvin's biography occurs only in the Secondary Phase of the radio series. Marvin rejoins the crew on the Heart of Gold, and using the improbability drive programmed by Zaphod Beeblebrox the Fourth, takes them to the ravaged planet Brontitall. Having landed in a giant floating marble copy of a plastic cup, the crew accidentally find themselves falling several miles through the air. The carbon-based members of the crew manage to stay alive by grabbing onto passing giant birds. Marvin has no such luck, and, upon impact with the ground, creates his own archaeological excavation site. Cruelly intact, he grudgingly saves the crew multiple times from the Foot Soldiers of the Dolmansaxlil Shoe Corporation. Dolmansaxlil is a portmanteau name created from real shoe shops of the 1980s, Dolcis, Freeman Hardy & Willis, Saxone and Lilley & Skinner. Marvin remains in Heart of Gold whilst Ford, Zaphod, Zarniwoop and Arthur bother the Ruler of the Universe, leaving when an enraged Arthur hijacks the ship.

However, in the Tertiary Phase, Trillian claims this story is Zaphod's hallucination, especially as the reverse temporal engineering explanation has not entered the plot yet. However, of the stories of Zaphod's visit to the Frogstar, the Guide says "10% are 95% true, 14% are 65% true, 35% are only 5% true and the rest are told by Zaphod Beeblebrox", and listeners are presented with one "version" of that visit.

In the television series, the black ship stolen at the Restaurant at the End of the Universe is actually the stunt ship of the Disaster Area rock band, and, having taken them back in time two million years before the present, is set on an irreversible course to collide with the sun of Kakrafoon. Forced to flee in the ship's barely functional teleport, the crew politely ask Marvin to stay behind and operate it. He does so and stoically awaits his fate "almost as good as death" in the heart of the blazing sun.

== Portrayals ==
=== Radio and TV ===
Marvin's voice was performed by Stephen Moore on the first five radio series and television series and by Jim Broadbent in the sixth radio series. David Learner operated his body on television, having previously played and voiced the part for the stage version.

=== Film ===
2005 film version

Warwick Davis wore the Marvin costume in the 2005 film. He is voiced by Alan Rickman. This Marvin's design is a departure from the Marvin of the television series, featuring shorter with an oversized head and stubby limbs. The original television costume from the 1981 television series was refurbished for a cameo role in the film, standing in a queue in the Vogon office on Vogsphere, where the main characters are trying to release Tricia, with various other life forms.

== Novel series ==
A difference between the radio and TV series occurs in the novels when the Heart of Gold crew arrive on the ancient planet of Magrathea. Marvin inadvertently saves the crew by plugging himself into the onboard computer of a police vehicle, which, when exposed to the true nature of Marvin's view of the universe, commits suicide, taking the two police who were then firing at the ship's crew with it. The crew leave Magrathea on the Heart of Gold, but are teleported summarily to Ursa Minor Beta, where Zaphod's great grandfather, in an apparent fit of vicious humour, forces Marvin to accompany Zaphod on his mission of self-discovery. Marvin subsequently saves Zaphod's life by engaging in a battle of wits with a vicious (yet stupid) automated tank and then is abandoned on the planet Frogstar B when Zaphod is sent to the Total Perspective Vortex. Eventually, the crew arrive at the Restaurant at the End of the Universe (which was built over the ruins of Frogstar B in this continuity) and the story continues as with the TV series.

In the third novel, Life, the Universe and Everything, we find that Marvin survived his collision with the sun of Kakrafoon, and was sent back in time by the Improbability Field projected by the Heart of Gold to be rescued by a scrap metal merchant on Sqornshellous Zeta. The merchant grafted a steel rod to Marvin's now-lost leg and sold him to a Mind Zoo, where excited onlookers would try to make him happy. This made him something of a celebrity on the planet of Sqornshellous Zeta, and he was asked to open the brand new bridge that was meant to revitalise the planet's economy. Marvin dutifully plugged himself into the bridge's opening circuit, and, just like the police computer, the bridge committed suicide, taking the entire gathered crowd with it. Marvin was left in the swamp, his false leg having trapped him in the mud, so he spent just over 1.5 million years walking around in a circle, "just to make the point." He planned to keep walking in a circle for another million years before trying it backwards. "Just for the variety, you understand."

Suddenly, he is kidnapped by a squad of Krikkit war robots, who are after his leg, a fragment of the key that will reopen their imprisoned world and restart the genocidal Krikkit War. Thinking that Marvin's intelligence will be an asset, they wire his brain into the interfaces of their intelligent war computer. This is a mistake. The once formidable Krikkit robots find themselves overcome with crippling sorrow and depression, and rather than focusing on their mission of extermination, instead sulk in corners doing quadratic equations. It is also due to Marvin's influence that Zaphod and the others' lives are spared by the Krikkit robots. Marvin is (presumably) rescued by his friends, who bring him back to the Heart of Gold. From here his story is unknown.

Marvin reappears in the second-to-last chapter of So Long, and Thanks for All the Fish. Arthur and Fenchurch find him on the planet where God's Final Message To His Creation is located. He is barely functional, claiming that, due to time travel, he is now "thirty-seven times older than the Universe itself." Every part of his body has been replaced, with the exception of "all the diodes down [his] left side", which have been giving him severe pain for the whole of his existence. Arthur and Fenchurch end up carrying him, enduring the robot's constant abuse, to the God's Final Message viewing station, where they lift him up to see the words of the message: "We apologise for the inconvenience." Astonishingly, Marvin responds "I think... I feel good about it." The lights in his eyes go out and his already-worn circuits completely stop working; Marvin is no more. (In the radio dramatisation, his last words are "Goodbye, Arthur." Marvin's 'death' prompts Arthur to say, "Miserable git!" and then, to his own obvious astonishment, to add, "I'll miss him.")

However, in the 2005 radio adaptation of the fifth novel in the series, Mostly Harmless, in which Marvin did not originally appear, he has a cameo at the end of the last episode alive and well. He explains that it turned out he was still covered by his warranty agreement and is back to parking cars at Milliways, the Restaurant at the End of the Universe.

== Songs ==
Marvin "Marvin" excerpt
An excerpt from "Marvin"

Stephen Moore released two pop singles—"Marvin/Metal Man" and "Reasons to Be Miserable/Marvin I Love You" (double B-side)—in the UK in 1981, though neither reached the top 40. One song was re-recorded and rearranged to coincide with the 2005 Hitchhiker's movie release, "Reasons To Be Miserable (His Name Is Marvin)", performed by Stephen Fry (singing in the third-person, not as Marvin).

=== "Marvin" ===
"Marvin" was released in 1981. It was a minor hit, reaching number 52 in the British Charts.

The song involves Marvin describing his woes ("My moving parts are in a solid state") and frustrations ("You know what really makes me mad? They clean me with a Brillo Pad"), to a synthesiser backing. The intro to the song consists of a simple guitar figure, but with the tape reversed so that the notes play backwards.

The vocal was performed by Stephen Moore, who had played Marvin on the radio and television series. Moore also narrated the ship's captain on the B-side.

"Metal Man" was the B-side. The song involves a spoken exchange between the starship captain (also played by Moore, as is a cameo radio voice) and the depressed robot Marvin. The starship is falling into a black hole, and can only be saved by assigning control to Marvin. In thanks for saving the ship, Marvin is relegated back to a menial servant. Such is the lot of a robot.

"Marvin" was incorporated into the 2012 live radio show.

=== The Double B-Side ===
"Reasons To Be Miserable" was released in 1981. Its official title was The Double 'B'-Side, and it was a double B-side single released by Polydor on Depressive Discs. The song involves Marvin describing his views on life ("I'd feel a little better if they broke me up for spares", "If I had my time again, I'd rather be a lemming"), to a synthesiser backing. The title is a reference to the hit song "Reasons to be Cheerful, Part 3" by Ian Dury and The Blockheads.

"Marvin I Love You" was the other B-side. Marvin describes finding a love letter in his data banks eons after receiving it. The female vocal is provided by Kimi Wong-O'Brien. The song was a frequently requested tune on the Dr. Demento radio show, and was featured on several Dr. Demento compilation albums. As of 2008, it is ranked 56 out of the top 100 favorite novelty tunes on the official Dr. Demento web site.

=== Marvin's lullaby ===
"How I Hate the Night", also known as "Marvin's lullaby", was published in the book Life, the Universe and Everything, where it is described as "a short dolorous ditty of no tone, or indeed tune." The first verse of "Marvin's Lullaby" appears close to the end of the episode "Fit the Seventeenth", and the second verse soon after the start of "Fit the Eighteenth" as listed below:

Now the world has gone to bed
Darkness won't engulf my head
I can see by infra-red
How I hate the night

Now I lay me down to sleep
Try to count electric sheep
Sweet dream wishes you can keep
How I hate the night

The line "try to count electric sheep" is a reference to Philip K. Dick's novel Do Androids Dream of Electric Sheep?, which inspired the movie Blade Runner. According to Don't Panic, Douglas Adams wrote a guitar tune for the lullaby, and thought it should have been released. In the radio series, Stephen Moore sings the words to a tune resembling "Abendsegen" from Humperdinck's opera Hansel and Gretel. The song was performed at the very end of the 2012 live radio show.

=== Outside the Hitchhiker's universe ===
In the episode "Sibling Tsunami" of the animated series My Life as a Teenage Robot, when asked what's wrong, XJ-7, a chronically depressed robot character, replied: "The usual, life, the universe, everything", a reference not only to Marvin, but the "Ultimate Question of Life, the Universe, and Everything", a central tenet of the series' storyline (as well as the title of the third book).

British alternative rock group Radiohead named "Paranoid Android", the lead single from their 1997 album OK Computer, after Marvin. "Paranoid Android" frequently appears on lists of greatest songs of all time and has been described as "possibly the most acclaimed song from the most acclaimed album of all time."

Marvin's origins (including those of the Sirius Cybernetics Corporation, and the HitchHikers handheld device) are referenced in the 2008 radio series The Long Dark Tea-Time of the Soul. In episode 4, Dirk Gently phones his friend Richard McDuff, who now works for a new startup, Sirius Cybernetics. Occasionally, background noises of electronic groans and air pistons can be heard. At the end of the phone call, the electronic voice of Stephen Moore says "Richard, I think we might have a problem with these diodes."

Marvin appeared and was declared the winner in the Q-series episode "Quests: Part II" of the panel game show QI.
