= The Restaurant at the End of the Universe =

1980 novel by Douglas Adams

- Cover of the first edition
- Author: Douglas Adams
- Language: English
- Series: Hitchhiker's Guide
- Genre: Comic science fiction
- Publisher: Pan Books
- Publication date: October 1980 (UK) January 1981 (US)
- Publication place: United Kingdom
- Media type: Print (hardback & paperback) Audiobook
- Pages: 208 (paperback edition)
- ISBN: 0-345-39181-0
- OCLC: 33352356
- Preceded by: The Hitchhiker's Guide to the Galaxy
- Followed by: Life, the Universe and Everything

The Restaurant at the End of the Universe is the second book in the Hitchhiker's Guide to the Galaxy science fiction comedy hexalogy, named a "trilogy" by Douglas Adams. It was originally published by Pan Books as a paperback in 1980. Like the preceding novel, it was adapted from Adams' radio series, and became a critically acclaimed cult classic.

The book was inspired by the song "Grand Hotel" by British rock band Procol Harum. Following directly on from the events of the previous book, it continues the misadventures of Arthur Dent, Ford Prefect, and the crew of the starship Heart of Gold on their journey across the universe and uncovering its bizarre mysteries.

== Synopsis ==
Arthur Dent, Ford Prefect, Trillian, and Zaphod Beeblebrox leave the planet Magrathea on the Heart of Gold. A Vogon ship bribed by Gag Halfrunt and a group of psychiatrists, fearful that the discovery of the Ultimate Question will end their profession, intercepts and fires at them. Meanwhile, Arthur gets frustrated that the ship is unable to produce any beverages beyond an undrinkable tea-like liquid that is "almost but not quite entirely unlike tea". He gives a lengthy description of tea, causing Eddie the Shipboard Computer to become CPU-bound and unable to fight the Vogon ship off. Desperate, Zaphod decides to hold a séance to call up his great-grandfather Zaphod Beeblebrox the Fourth to rescue them. The elder Zaphod scolds his descendant and sends him on a quest to find The Ruler of the Universe in order to solve the political and economic instability plaguing the universe. He transports Zaphod and Marvin to Ursa Minor Beta, the tropical home planet of the offices of the Hitchhiker's Guide's publisher Megadodo Publications, and leaves the others on the depowered ship in a black void.

Acting on a thought from the portion of his brain unaffected by his lobotomy, Zaphod goes looking for Zarniwoop, the Guide's lead editor, though his staff insist he has been out on an intergalactic cruise. A man named Roosta takes Zaphod to Zarniwoop's offices. Frogstar fighters arrive and attack the building, towing it to one of their home planets, Frogstar World B, a planet whose society collapsed through an economic process called the "Shoe Event Horizon" which rendered its economy unable to support any enterprises besides shoe stores. The planet eventually became the site of the Total Perspective Vortex, a device that drives those who experience it mad due to showing them their insignificance compared to the infinite universe. Following Roosta's instructions and escaping through Zarniwoop's office's windows, Zaphod is caught by Gargravarr, a disembodied mind undergoing a trial separation from his body, who takes Zaphod to be exposed to the Vortex. However, Zaphod is unfazed by the Vortex, suggesting to a perplexed Gargravarr that it showed Zaphod that he was the most important being in the universe.

Left on his own, Zaphod eventually finds a long-abandoned spaceliner whose passengers have been forcibly kept in 900 years of suspended animation by the autopilot after the collapse of their civilization until a new one could develop to load the ship with lemon-scented paper napkins. On the ship he discovers Zarniwoop, who reveals that Zaphod stepped into a computer simulation of the universe when he walked into his office, allowing Zaphod to survive the Vortex since the universe was designed for his benefit. Zarniwoop further reveals that the Heart of Gold had been microscopically shrunk and placed in Zaphod's pocket so that they can use it to find the true ruler of the universe, whom Zarniwoop has located. However, Zaphod abandons Zarniwoop, reunites with Ford, Arthur, and Trillian, and escapes to the nearest restaurant. This turns out to be Milliways, the Restaurant at the End of the Universe, built atop the ruins of Frogstar World B and existing in a time bubble near the end of the universe, of which it offers its guests spectacular views. At the restaurant they meet Ford's old acquaintance Hotblack Desiato, a member of the rock band Disaster Area, which is known for making the loudest sound in the universe and only perform their concerts remotely from an orbiting spaceship. During their dinner, Zaphod receives a telephone call from Marvin, who has been stranded on the planet for billions of years and is now working as a valet in the restaurant's parking lot.

Zaphod suggests they leave, trying to steal a sleek, all-black spacecraft next to Hotblack Desiato's limoship. With their ship on complete autopilot and unable to wrest the controls away from it, an agitated Zaphod admits that he still wants to solve the Question to the Ultimate Answer. Marvin abruptly tells them that the question is imprinted in Arthur's brainwaves, but they are distracted before they can ask further. They learn that the ship is actually an uncrewed stunt ship for Disaster Area, which is programmed to fall into a local sun to create solar flares in synchronisation with the climax of the band's concert. They discover a partially installed emergency teleporter without a guidance system and Zaphod volunteers Marvin to stay behind and operate it so the others can escape. Zaphod and Trillian find themselves back aboard the Heart of Gold under Zarniwoop's control, where he is using the ship's Improbability Drive to penetrate the Unprobability Field that is protecting the home planet of the Ruler of the Universe. On an unpopulated planet, they find the Ruler who has no idea he is the ruler, is not convinced of a broader universe outside of his home, and is even skeptical if anything around him exists. While an enraged Zarniwoop tries to reason with the Ruler, Zaphod and Trillian strand him and make their escape in the Heart of Gold.

Meanwhile, Arthur and Ford find themselves aboard Ark Fleet Ship B, which is loaded with 15 million passengers from the planet Golgafrincham and is commanded by an inept captain who is only concerned with taking baths. Although the Golgafrinchans were ostensibly evacuated to escape a planetary disaster, in actuality the disaster was made up by the Golgafrinchans to divest themselves of a useless third of their population, later going extinct from a pandemic caused by dirty telephone receivers after they expelled all telephone sanitizers. The Ark crash-lands into a swamp on an undeveloped planet. Arthur and Ford leave to search for a signal from any passing spaceship, traveling for hundreds of miles around the continent. Along the way the planet's primitive yet friendly hominid-like inhabitants usher them away from their home settlements and leave them fruit. After finding a glacier with a Magrathean inscription honoring Slartibartfast, they realise they are on pre-historic Earth in 2,000,000 BC, that the hominids are Neanderthals, that they have traveled across Europe from the future site of Arthur's home city of Islington in Great Britain to Norway, and that the Golgafrinchans are the ancestors of the modern human race.

They return to the Golgafrinchans, only to find that they have been too preoccupied with trying to form council meetings about documentary-making, fiscal policy, searching for hot springs for the captain's baths, and declaring war on uninhabited continents to bother with trying to discover fire, invent the wheel, or solve pressing issues. Ford tries to warn them that they will be annihilated in 2 million years, but they ignore him. Desperate, Arthur tries to teach the Neanderthals, who have been mysteriously wasting away since the Ark's arrival, through a makeshift Scrabble set. When one of the Neanderthals spells out the word "forty-two" with the letter tiles, Ford realises that the Neanderthals were part of the matrix of Deep Thought's computer to determine the Ultimate Question and that the Golgafrinchans are interfering with the machination by displacing them. However, they also remember Marvin's claim that the Ultimate Question was embedded in Arthur's mind. Hoping that remnants of the programming exist in Arthur's subconscious, they have Arthur pull out tiles at random from the Scrabble set, only to discover that the Question is "What do you get if you multiply six by nine?" It is later revealed that this is a distortion of the real Question in the sequel. The two resign to make the best of their life on prehistoric Earth. They go on a date with two Golgafrinchan women, and Arthur throws his copy of the Hitchhiker's Guide in the river.

== Audiobook adaptations ==
There have been three audiobook recordings of the novel. The first was an abridged edition, recorded in 1981 by Stephen Moore, best known for playing the voice of Marvin the Paranoid Android in the radio series, LP adaptations, and in the TV series. In 1990, Adams himself recorded an unabridged edition, later re-released by New Millennium Audio in the United States and available from BBC Audiobooks in the United Kingdom. In 2006, actor Martin Freeman, who had played Arthur Dent in the 2005 movie, recorded a new unabridged edition of the audiobook.

== Reception ==
Greg Costikyan reviewed The Restaurant at the End of the Universe in Ares Magazine #13 and commented that "The Restaurant at the End of the Universe tries to do much of the same thing, but some of the zest seems to be missing; the ideas are fewer, the happenings less dramatic. The author seems sometimes to be straining for the same effects he effortlessly achieved in Hitchhiker." However, in the Ultimate Hitchhiker's Guide to The Galaxy: 42nd Anniversary Edition, special material sourced from the Pan Books archives shows quotes from the Monty Python team and other reviews choosing Mr. Adams' books as Book of The Year.

== Reviews ==
- Review by Joseph Nicholas (1980) in Paperback Inferno, Volume 4, Number 3
- Review by John Sherriff (1981) in Foundation, #21 February 1981
- Review by Jo Duffy (1982) in Epic Illustrated, February 1982
- Review by Bud Foote (1982) in Science Fiction & Fantasy Book Review, #3, April 1982
- Review by Allen Varney (1982) in Science Fiction Review, Summer 1982
- Review by C. J. Henderson [as by Chris Henderson] (1982) in Dragon Magazine, May 1982
- Review [French] by Stéphane Nicot? (1983) in Fiction, #337
- Review by Alma Jo Williams (1983) in Science Fiction Review, November 1983
- Review by Don D'Ammassa (1986) in Science Fiction Chronicle, #87 December 1986
- Review by Alan Johnson (1994) in Vector 179
- Review by uncredited (2003) in Vector 227
- Review by Bruce Gillespie (2010) in SF Commentary, #80A
- Review by Manny Rayner (2014) in Big Sky, #4: SF Masterworks 2
