= The Hitchhiker's Guide to the Galaxy Primary and Secondary Phases =

Radio series written by Douglas Adams

The front cover of the 1996 CD release of The Primary Phase, one of the first BBC CD releases

The terms Primary Phase and Secondary Phase describe the first two radio series of The Hitchhiker's Guide to the Galaxy, first broadcast in 1978. These were the first incarnations of the Hitchhiker's Guide to the Galaxy franchise. Both were written by Douglas Adams and consist of six episodes each.

The series followed the aimless wanderings of Arthur Dent, Ford Prefect and his book, the eponymous Guide. It introduced unfamiliar music, mind-stretching concepts and the newest science mixed together with out-of-context parodies, unfeasibly rude names, "semantic and philosophical jokes", compressed prose, and "groundbreaking deployment of sound effects and voice techniques". By the time the sixth episode was broadcast, the show had a cult following. A Christmas special would follow, many repeats and a second series. The two original series were followed by three more in 2004 and 2005 and a final, sixth series in 2018.

The following article is a list of episodes from the Primary and Secondary Phases. For information on its production, see The Hitchhiker's Guide to the Galaxy.

== The Primary Phase ==
The first radio series was broadcast on BBC Radio 4 in March and April 1978. It was split into episodes, known as "Fits" (an archaic term for a section of a poem revived by Lewis Carroll for The Hunting of the Snark). The original series comprised Fit the First to Fit the Sixth. Fits the Fifth and Sixth were co-written by John Lloyd; subsequent versions of the story omit most of Lloyd's material.

The success of the series encouraged Adams to adapt it into a novel, which was based on the first four Fits and released in the second week of October 1979. A slightly contracted double LP re-recording of the first four Fits was released in the same year, followed by a single LP featuring a revised version of Fits the Fifth and Sixth and the second book, both in 1980.

=== Fit the First ===
- Broadcast on BBC Radio 4, 8 March 1978 10:30pm

Cast

- The Book (narrator): Peter Jones
- Arthur Dent: Simon Jones
- Prosser and Prostetnic Vogon Jeltz (Vogon Captain): Bill Wallis
- Ford Prefect: Geoffrey McGivern
- Lady Cynthia Fitzmelton: Jo Kendall
- The Barman: David Gooderson

Arthur Dent is attempting to prevent the local council from bulldozing his house to make way for a bypass. Dent's friend, Ford Prefect takes Arthur to the pub. At the pub, Ford explains that he is an alien and that the world is about to end. After Arthur and Ford return to the ruins of Arthur's house, a fleet of Vogon Constructor Ships arrives in the sky, and Prostetnic Vogon Jeltz broadcasts an announcement that they are to demolish the Earth to make way for a hyperspace bypass. Panic ensues. Ford uses his "electronic thumb" to hitch a lift onto one of the ships, taking Arthur with him, just moments before the Earth is destroyed. The episode ends on a cliffhanger, as the Vogon Captain tortures them by reading them some of his poetry before ejecting them into space.

Music: "Journey of the Sorcerer" from One of These Nights by Eagles; "A Rainbow in Curved Air" from A Rainbow in Curved Air by Terry Riley; Lontano and Volumina by György Ligeti.

=== Fit the Second ===
- Broadcast on BBC Radio 4, 15 March 1978

Cast

- The Book (narrator): Peter Jones
- Arthur Dent: Simon Jones
- Ford Prefect: Geoffrey McGivern
- Prostetnic Vogon Jeltz: Bill Wallis
- Vogon Guard: David Tate
- Eddie the Computer: David Tate
- Trillian: Susan Sheridan
- Zaphod Beeblebrox: Mark Wing-Davey
- Marvin the Paranoid Android and Gag Halfrunt: Stephen Moore
- Announcer (uncredited): John Marsh

Arthur and Ford Prefect are rescued after 29 seconds, by a starship. They have been picked up by the Heart of Gold, which has been stolen by Ford's semi-cousin and President of the Galaxy, Zaphod Beeblebrox. The Heart of Gold works on the basis of infinite improbability, allowing its drive to do anything for which the improbability factor is known. Also onboard are Trillian, née Tricia McMillan, also from Earth, and depressed Marvin the Paranoid Android. As the episode ends, Eddie the Shipboard Computer announces that the ship is moving into orbit around the legendary planet of Magrathea.

Notes: First appearance of Marvin the Paranoid Android, Trillian, Eddie the computer, Gag Halfrunt, and Zaphod Beeblebrox.

Music: "Wind on Water" from Evening Star by Fripp & Eno; "A Rainbow in Curved Air" and "Poppy Nogood and the Phantom Band" from A Rainbow in Curved Air by Terry Riley; "Cachaça (Baião)" from The Story of I by Patrick Moraz.

=== Fit the Third ===
- Broadcast on BBC Radio 4, 22 March 1978

Cast

- The Book (narrator): Peter Jones
- Arthur Dent: Simon Jones
- Ford Prefect: Geoffrey McGivern
- Zaphod Beeblebrox: Mark Wing-Davey
- Eddie the Computer: David Tate
- Trillian: Susan Sheridan
- Recorded voice and Slartibartfast: Richard Vernon
- Sperm Whale (uncredited) and Marvin the Paranoid Android: Stephen Moore
- Announcer (uncredited): John Marsh

After a threat of attack by missiles from the planet, Arthur comes to meet planet designer Slartibartfast on Magrathea. Arthur recognizes the latter's latest project as a copy of Earth. Slartibartfast explains that the original Earth had been destroyed five minutes too early, and they are constructing a replacement. The original Earth, which Arthur and Trillian came from, had been commissioned by some mice in order to find the "Ultimate Question".

Notes: For copyright reasons, many versions of this episode remove the Pink Floyd played by Marvin and Arthur's reference to it.

Music: "Katakomben" from Einstieg by Gruppe Between; "Space Theme" from Go by Go; Continuum by György Ligeti; Oxygène by Jean-Michel Jarre; "That's Entertainment!"; "Shine On You Crazy Diamond" by Pink Floyd*; "Rock and Roll Music" by The Beatles*; "Wind on Water" from Evening Star by Fripp & Eno; "Over Fire Island" from Another Green World by Brian Eno

* denotes music from the portion of the episode removed from CD releases.

=== Fit the Fourth ===
- Broadcast on BBC Radio 4, 29 March 1978

Cast

- The Book: Peter Jones
- Arthur Dent: Simon Jones
- Slartibartfast: Richard Vernon
- Deep Thought and Ford Prefect: Geoffrey McGivern
- Zaphod Beeblebrox: Mark Wing-Davey
- Trillian: Susan Sheridan
- First Computer Programmer/Bang Bang/Magrathean PA Voice: Ray Hassett
- Second Computer Programmer: Jeremy SR Browne
- Cheerleader and Majikthise: Jonathan Adams
- Vroomfondel and Shooty: James Broadbent
- Frankie Mouse: Peter Hawkins
- Benjy Mouse: David Tate
- Announcer (uncredited): John Marsh (introductory announcement only)
- Announcer (uncredited): Brian Perkins (closing announcement only)

Slartibartfast explains that mice are colossal pan-dimensional beings who created a supercomputer named "Deep Thought" to answer the "Ultimate Question of Life, the Universe and Everything". After 7.5 million years, it delivered its answer: 42. When the mice expressed confusion, Deep Thought offered to design a greater computer to clarify the question. The computer was Earth.

The Vogons destroyed Earth five minutes before it was to deliver its findings. The mice contracted the Magratheans to build a replacement, but then, reasoning that the findings might be accessible via the last remaining products of Earth—Arthur and Trillian—summon them to a conference room where they begin negotiations with the humans to obtain the information. A Galactic Police ship, pursuing Zaphod for grand theft, arrives and the officers start shooting, destroying a Magrathean computer bank.

Music: A Rainbow in Curved Air by Terry Riley; "Moon City" from In Search of Ancient Gods by Absolute Elsewhere; Mikrophonie I by Karlheinz Stockhausen.

=== Fit the Fifth ===
- Written by Douglas Adams and John Lloyd
- Broadcast on BBC Radio 4, 5 April 1978

Cast

- The Book: Peter Jones
- Arthur Dent: Simon Jones
- Ford Prefect: Geoffrey McGivern
- Zaphod Beeblebrox: Mark Wing-Davey
- Trillian: Susan Sheridan
- Garkbit/The Great Prophet Zarquon: Anthony Sharp
- Compere (Max Quordlepleen): Roy Hudd
- Marvin the Paranoid Android: Stephen Moore
- Announcer (uncredited): John Marsh

Arthur, Ford, Trillian and Zaphod awaken disoriented, and find themselves at Milliways, The Restaurant at the End of the Universe—a restaurant built on the ruins of Magrathea in a time bubble at the exact moment the Universe ends. The exploding computer created a time warp that deposited them there. Marvin was not affected, and has been waiting throughout Magrathean history for them to arrive. They join him in the carpark where they discover a sleek, frictionless black ship. They steal it but they can’t control it. It enters hyperspace and exits the galaxy where it becomes part of a massive battle fleet.

Music: Melodien by György Ligeti; "The Engulfed Cathedral" from Snowflakes Are Dancing by Isao Tomita; A Rainbow in Curved Air by Terry Riley; "Wind on Water" from Evening Star by Fripp & Eno.

=== Fit the Sixth ===
- Written by Douglas Adams and John Lloyd
- Broadcast on BBC Radio 4, 12 April 1978

Cast

- The Book: Peter Jones
- Arthur Dent: Simon Jones
- Ford Prefect: Geoffrey McGivern
- Zaphod Beeblebrox: Mark Wing-Davey
- Trillian: Susan Sheridan
- "B" Ark Captain and Caveman: David Jason
- Number One and Management Consultant: Jonathan Cecil
- Haggunenon Underfleet Commander/Number Two/Hairdresser: Aubrey Woods
- Marketing Girl: Beth Porter
- Announcer (uncredited): John Marsh

On the black ship, they receive confusing transmissions from the second-in-command of the battle fleet, who first resembles a leopard and then a shoebox. They consult the Guide and learn that the fleet belongs to the Haggunenon, a race of xenophobic shape-shifters. The fleet commander is hiding onboard, and shifts into the form of the Bugblatter Beast of Traal. The stowaways try to escape the ship, but Zaphod, Trillian and Marvin are eaten by the commander.

Arthur and Ford teleport to a Golgafrincham Ark, run by a small crew so consumed with offering pleasantries and comfort that nothing ever gets done. The bulk of the ship carries service industry workers, maintenance personnel and junior corporate executives in suspended animation. The captain believes that the ship is part of a fleet in which his entire race is escaping their dying world; Ford and Arthur deduce that there are no other ships, and the rest of the race has expelled the least useful elements of their society into space.

The Ark crashes on an Earth-like planet. Arthur and Ford discover that on leaving Milliways they have traveled into the distant past, returning to the original Earth two million years before its destruction. The Golgafrinchams begin colonising in earnest, establishing a bureaucratic society so bogged down with trivialities that it can't reach meaningful decisions. The native hominids, which are part of the computer program, begin dying out.

Arthur tries to preserve the hominids by teaching them Scrabble. When one of their number chooses random tiles and spells out "forty two", Ford and Arthur realise the program has already gone wrong. They use the same random method to access the "Ultimate Question" supposedly contained in Arthur's brainwaves, and discover it is "What do you get if you multiply six by nine?" Bemoaning the useless chaos of the Universe, they rejoin the Golgafrincham colony.

The regular ending music is replaced with "What a Wonderful World" by Louis Armstrong.

Music: Oxygène by Jean-Michel Jarre; Volumina by György Ligeti; "Volkstanz" from Einsteig by Gruppe Between.

== The Secondary Phase ==
The cover of the 1996 CD release of "The Secondary Phase"

What became "Fit the Seventh" actually started as a "Christmas Special" episode, and an early draft included a reference to the holiday, though the episode, as transmitted, does not. Five further episodes, to complete the second series (later retitled "The Secondary Phase") were commissioned in May 1979. These final five episodes (the last on radio until 2004) were "stripped", or broadcast on each of five days in a single week in January 1980.

Trillian is entirely missing from this series. Her fate is addressed in Fit the Seventh, that she had effected an escape but had then been forcibly married to the President of the Algolian chapter of the Galactic Rotary Club. The character returns in The Tertiary Phase, where she dismisses most of the events of the Secondary Phase as having been one of Zaphod's "psychotic episodes".

=== Fit the Seventh ===
- Broadcast on BBC Radio 4, 24 December 1978

Cast

- The Book: Peter Jones
- Arthur Dent: Simon Jones
- Ford Prefect/Frogstar Robot/Air Traffic Controller: Geoffrey McGivern
- Zaphod Beeblebrox: Mark Wing-Davey
- Marvin the Paranoid Android and Gag Halfrunt: Stephen Moore
- Arcturan Number One: Bill Paterson
- Arcturan Captain/Radio Voice/Receptionist/Lift: David Tate
- Roosta: Alan Ford
- Announcer (uncredited): John Marsh

The episode opens in the Hitchhiker's offices on Ursa Minor Beta, with a receptionist claiming that Zarniwoop, the editor of the guide, is too busy to take a call because he is both in his office and on an intergalactic cruise.

It then moves to the bridge of a megafreighter that is due to land on Ursa Minor Beta. A crewmember denounces the Hitchhiker's Guide for being soft, and notes that he has heard they have created a whole artificial universe. Zaphod Beeblebrox is a hitch-hiker on the freighter, and as he listens to the radio, he hears a report that he has died, by being eaten by a Haggunenon. The manner of his escape is left unclear.

Meanwhile, Arthur and Ford are stuck in Earth's pre-history, drunk. As they discuss their predicament, they notice a spaceship half-appearing in front of them. They celebrate their rescue, but it vanishes. Eventually they deduce that this is a time paradox, and they need to figure out how to signal the ship in the future so they can be rescued. Following this is the Guide's entry on the subject of towels, marking its first appearance.

On the ship, Zaphod explains to the crewmember that he is going to Ursa Minor Beta to find out what he's doing. He receives a message from himself the previous night, telling him to see Zarniwoop in order to learn something to his disadvantage. Zaphod then explains how he escaped—the Haggunenon turned into an escape capsule before it got the chance to eat him.

Zaphod arrives at the Hitchhiker's offices, and demands to see Zarniwoop, but is given the same excuses as before. After revealing his identity, he is directed to Zarniwoop's office, and meets up with Marvin, who had also survived and coincidentally arrived at the same place. After Marvin persuades the lift to take them upwards, the building starts to shake due to it being bombed.

Zaphod is met by Roosta, who blames the bombing on Zaphod failing to conceal his presence on the planet adequately. A Frogstar Robot class D soon arrives to come and get Zaphod. Zaphod orders Marvin to stop it (which he does, by tricking it into destroying the floor it is standing on), whilst Zaphod and Roosta escape into the pocket universe in Zarniwoop's office. Eventually, the Frogstar Robots decide to take the entire building back to the Frogstar.

From the perspective of the three later radio series, all of the subsequent events of the Secondary Phase occur only in Zarniwoop's artificial universe, and not in the "real" universe. They are later dismissed by Trillian as "psychotic episodes".

=== Fit the Eighth ===
- Broadcast on BBC Radio 4, 21 January 1980

Cast

- The Book: Peter Jones
- Zaphod Beeblebrox: Mark Wing-Davey
- Roosta: Alan Ford
- Frogstar Prisoner Relations Officer/Eddie the Computer: David Tate
- Arthur Dent: Simon Jones
- Ford Prefect: Geoffrey McGivern
- Gargravarr: Valentine Dyall
- Announcer (uncredited): John Marsh

The episode opens with Zaphod and Roosta in the Guide building, which is being towed to the Frogstar, "the most totally evil place in the Galaxy". Roosta explains that they are going to feed Zaphod to the "Total Perspective Vortex", which no one has ever survived. A Frogstar Prisoner Relations Officer then teleports in to taunt Zaphod.

Meanwhile, in Earth's past, Ford and Arthur are still dealing with the rescue ship that has half-appeared in front of them. Rather stuck for how to signal it, they wave a towel at it, and surprisingly, the spaceship appears to notice this and lands rather catastrophically, trapping them under a boulder and sending the towel into a lava flow.

They appear to be stuck, so they ask The Guide what to do if one is stuck under a rock with no hope of rescue. The guide has an entry that begins, "Consider how lucky you are that life has been good to you so far..."

However, it becomes apparent that the boulder they are under is actually the ship, the Heart of Gold, and Zaphod Beeblebrox comes out of it, rather the worse for wear. He explains that he has been put in the Total Perspective Vortex and survived. After this, he celebrated and is hungover from a week's celebration. He explains that the towel had been fossilised, and when the Earth was blown up two million years later, the Improbability Drive picked it up.

The story then continues in flashback, picking up with Zaphod and Roosta on the Guide building. They attempt to escape with a "body debit" (teleport) card, but are foiled by the Relations Officer. After being tricked into signing a consent form for entering the Vortex, Zaphod is teleported to the service. He meets Gargravarr, a disembodied voice and the guardian of the Vortex. He is then placed in it and exposed to its action, which is to place the user into Total Perspective by showing, with unfiltered perception, themselves in relation to the universe, “for a moment”. Zaphod survives, much to the astonishment of Gargravarr. He reports that it showed him that he is a "really great guy".

=== Fit the Ninth ===
- Broadcast on BBC Radio 4, 22 January 1980

Cast

- The Book: Peter Jones
- Arthur Dent: Simon Jones
- Ford Prefect/Ventilation System: Geoffrey McGivern
- Zaphod Beeblebrox: Mark Wing-Davey
- Vogon Captain: Bill Wallis
- Marvin the Paranoid Android/Vogon Guard/Gag Halfrunt: Stephen Moore
- Eddie the Computer/Vogon Guard/Vogon Computer: David Tate
- Nutrimat Machine: Leueen Willoughby
- Zaphod Beeblebrox IV: Richard Goolden
- Announcer (uncredited): John Marsh
- One of the singing robots (uncredited): Geoffrey Perkins
- Another of the singing robots (uncredited): Paddy Kingsland

The episode opens with Ford and Arthur discussing Zaphod's sanity on board the Heart of Gold. Ford also starts correcting Arthur's grammar, forcing Arthur to refer to Earth in the past tense, as it had been demolished in Fit the First. Ford then begins to question the reason given for the demolition, stating "that was all done away with centuries ago. No one demolishes planets anymore." Ford has noticed another fleet of Vogon ships following the Heart of Gold at a distance of five light years for half an hour. He then calls for Marvin to bring Zaphod to the bridge.

Meanwhile, Prostetnic Vogon Jeltz confirms the identity of the ship and its occupants, then proceeds to wipe out half his crew in a fit of rage. After this massacre, he contacts Gag Halfrunt. Halfrunt is revealed not only to be Jeltz's psychiatrist (as well as Zaphod's), but also the psychiatrist who originally hired Jeltz to destroy first the Earth, then any survivors. Jeltz is asked to hold off on his final destruction of the Heart of Gold until Halfrunt can make an arrangement for fees still owed by Zaphod.

Halfrunt contacts Zaphod, who has since arrived on the Heart of Gold's bridge, but refuses to see the Vogon threat as anything more than a delusion of grandeur. Zaphod destroys the Heart of Gold's radio, then attempts to get the ship's computer to engage the Infinite Improbability Drive in order to get the Heart of Gold away from the Vogons. The computer states that this is not possible, as all its circuits have become busy with another task, and insists that the result will be something they can all "Share and Enjoy."

The Guide explains that "Share and Enjoy" is the motto of the Sirius Cybernetics Corporation Complaints Division. A song, sung by the company's robots, with voices a flattened fifth out of tune, is heard. Another product of SCC that never works, the Nutrimat, is introduced, as Arthur is attempting to get it to dispense tea. Arthur eventually converses with the Nutrimat, the floor and the ventilation system, trying to convince them that he wants tea; Eddie, the ship's computer is finally brought in, to work out "why the human prefers boiled leaves to everything we have to offer him...."

This is then revealed to be the problem preventing the computer from evading the Vogons. Zaphod decides to contact his great-grandfather, Zaphod Beeblebrox IV, through a seance. More background behind Zaphod's actual job and a conspiracy to discover the real ruler of the universe is revealed. As the episode ends, Eddie has been restored to normal function, and engages the IID, getting the ship out of firing range of the Vogons in the nick of time.

=== Fit the Tenth ===
- Broadcast on BBC Radio 4, 23 January 1980

Cast

- The Book: Peter Jones
- Arthur Dent: Simon Jones
- Ford Prefect: Geoffrey McGivern
- Zaphod Beeblebrox: Mark Wing-Davey
- Eddie the Computer: David Tate
- Marvin the Paranoid Android: Stephen Moore
- Bird One: Ronald Baddiley
- Bird Two and Footwarrior: John Baddeley
- The Wise Old Bird: John Le Mesurier
- Lintilla: Rula Lenska
- Announcer (uncredited): John Marsh

The episode opens with more background material on Arthur Dent, specifically how the "remarkably unremarkable" human from Earth had an effect on the war between the G'Gugvunts and Vl'Hurgs, and will now have further significance on the planet Brontitall, where the Heart of Gold has just arrived. Zaphod and Ford discuss their arrival in a cave with Eddie the computer, noting the cold. Eddie calculates after they, along with Arthur and Marvin, have departed the ship, and that they are thirteen miles above ground level, despite there not being any mountains on the planet.

The four begin to explore the cave. Shortly, Arthur falls out of the cave mouth. Zaphod nearly falls as well, but catches the lip of the cave mouth, then discovers for himself that they are "miles up in the air." Ford talks to Zaphod while the latter dangles.

Meanwhile, Arthur has managed to fall onto a large passing bird. The bird reveals that the "cave" is actually a mile long marble sculpture of a plastic cup, hanging in the sky, part of a larger statue. The bird flies Arthur to the main statue, which is known as "Arthur Dent Throwing the Nutrimatic Cup." Arthur then reveals himself to be the very person that the statue is modeled after, and the bird flies into the statue's right ear, where the rest of his kind live. Arthur meets them, and their leader, the Wise Old Bird, and learns a few things about the past of Brontitall. For example, the statue was built in Arthur's honour after his argument with the Nutrimat Machine inspired them to rid themselves of the "blight of the robots". There is one thing the birds refuse to speak of, however, and the Wise Old Bird tells Arthur, "if you want to know, you will have to descend to the ground...."

The Guide mentions how little is still considered to be unspeakable in the galaxy, except for the rudest word in existence: "Belgium". Zaphod uses this word to finally convince Ford to attempt a rescue, still dangling from the lip of the mile-long cup. The attempt fails, and both of them fall out of the cup, and onto another passing bird.

On the surface, Arthur encounters a Footwarrior, who has declared the planet of Brontitall to be the property of the Dolmansaxlil Galactic Shoe Corporation. Fleeing the Footwarrior, Arthur takes refuge in a trench with an archaeologist named Lintilla, who tells Arthur that she's on Brontitall to discover why the Footwarriors are all limping due to blisters, as the episode ends.

=== Fit the Eleventh ===
- Broadcast on BBC Radio 4, 24 January 1980

Cast

- The Book: Peter Jones
- Arthur Dent: Simon Jones
- Lintilla (and two clones): Rula Lenska
- Ford Prefect: Geoffrey McGivern
- Zaphod Beeblebrox: Mark Wing-Davey
- Bird and Footwarrior: John Baddeley
- Hig Hurtenflurst: Marc Smith
- Film Commentator and Computeach: David Tate
- Pupil and Marvin the Paranoid Android: Stephen Moore
- Announcer (uncredited): John Marsh

The episode opens with a conversation between Lintilla and Arthur. Lintilla mentions that she's an archaeologist, stranded on Brontitall, as her spaceship was disabled. She activates her crisis inducer, and leads Arthur through a set of tunnels. While they're running, the narrator describes the state of medical science in the universe, with artificially induced injuries.

Meanwhile, Zaphod and Ford have landed on the back of one of the birds from the previous episode, and eventually convince it to reach the ground by wrapping Ford's towel around its eyes. But because the bird had to reach the ground, it and its fellow birds are upset, and start attacking Zaphod and Ford on the surface. A loud noise occurs, which causes the narrator to explain its lack of immediate context.

Arthur emerges from a tunnel behind Lintilla, who had overcompensated for her artificially induced crisis. Lintilla introduces Arthur to two of her "sisters" (actually clones), and they begin discussing the noise, finally establishing a context for it. Lintilla finally admits that there are 578,000,000,000 clones of herself in the universe. The narrator explains how this happened, and what is being done about it. Lintilla takes Arthur to the shaft suddenly created after the mysterious loud noise, and they finally confirm what the three Lintillas had been looking for: "An entire archaeological layer of compressed shoes." After making this confirmation, they are captured by Hig Hurtenflurst, who only happens to be a Dolmansaxlil Shoe Corporation executive.

The narrator finally describes what made the noise and created the shaft that gave the Lintillas their breakthrough. It's none other than Marvin, who himself finally fell out of the cup that the Heart of Gold is parked in. He's lying at the bottom of a mile deep shaft, and goes "zootlewurdle." Meanwhile, Hig has decided to take Lintilla and Arthur back to his office.

Hig explains the background of what happened to Brontitall – they fell victim to a Dolmansaxlil Shoe Shop Intensifier Ray, forcing them to construct nothing but shoe shops, and selling nothing but badly made shoes. Arthur learns that Earth was to be one of the next targets, spared from this by being demolished by the Vogons. The film being shown to Arthur and Lintilla explaining the Shoe Shop Intensifier Ray is suddenly interrupted, so is the power to the office, when Marvin decides to rescue Arthur, Lintilla and her two clones.

The narrator then explains that the Shoe Shop Intensifier Ray was unnecessary, that a "Shoe Event Horizon" would have occurred on that planet, and many other worlds, as part of their natural economic histories. A lesson from the future is heard, explaining this principle. Lintilla, Arthur and Marvin continue their escape, while Ford and Zaphod finally arrive at a large, very old building, and enter it to take shelter from the still angry bird people.

They discover that the building is a spaceport, and find abandoned ships left inside it. One such ship is still connected to supply lines, and still has power. Zaphod makes himself a stethoscope (for both heads), and holds it to the hull of this ship. He's stunned by what he hears inside, and here the episode ends.

=== Fit the Twelfth ===
- Broadcast on BBC Radio 4, 25 January 1980

Cast

- The Book: Peter Jones
- Arthur Dent: Simon Jones
- Ford Prefect and Varntvar The Priest: Geoffrey McGivern
- Zaphod Beeblebrox: Mark Wing-Davey
- Lintillas and Android Stewardess: Rula Lenska
- The Allitnils: David Tate
- Poodoo: Ken Campbell
- Autopilot and Zarniwoop: Jonathan Pryce
- Marvin the Paranoid Android and The Man in the Shack: Stephen Moore
- Announcer (uncredited): John Marsh

Ford and Zaphod have discovered a derelict spaceport, including one ship, still intact and having power, with its supply lines still connected. Zaphod creates a stethoscope for both heads out of some pieces of tubing, and is shocked at what he hears inside. Ford asks to listen, and finally, everyone gets to hear an android stewardess making an announcement about their delayed space flight. Zaphod calculates that the ship is in fact over 900 years late. Ford and Zaphod agree to find their way into the ship to investigate further.

Meanwhile, Arthur and Lintilla finally find Lintilla's two clones on Brontitall, but they, along with Marvin, are discovered by the Footwarriors as power is restored. Arthur agrees to run down the corridor while the others lay down cover fire with "a gun of some sort", then Arthur will have them throw the gun to him, so that he can lay down cover fire while they run to meet him. As Arthur completes the first part of this task, he's met by a man named Poodoo, a priest named Varntvar, and three men named Allitnil. During this confusion, Arthur manages to get Lintilla to throw the gun down the corridor, and starts firing to cover their run to join him. While Arthur does this, Poodoo is explaining how keen he is to introduce the Allitnils to the Lintillas, for a quiet social evening, and "a priest [is] on hand in case anybody wants to get married at all. Just to round off the evening." Arthur questions his sanity.

The Lintillas finally join Arthur, and Poodoo seizes his opportunity to introduce the Allitnils to them. They are immediately overwhelmingly attracted to each other, but are warned off from kissing each other until married. The priest is then called upon to perform three weddings. As the weddings conclude and the men kiss their brides, two of the three pairs disappear in "a puff of unsmoke" as Arthur discovers that the marriage certificates are actually cloning machine company "Agreements to Cease to Be" and cries out, stopping the final couple from kissing.

Meanwhile, Ford and Zaphod enter the very late space ship just as the passengers are being woken from suspended animation for coffee and biscuits. Ford and Zaphod flee the scene, eventually arriving on the flight deck, where they are continually ordered by the autopilot to return to their seats. The autopilot argues with them over the statistical likelihood of another civilisation delivering the lemon soaked paper napkins required by the spaceship before it can depart, and Ford and Zaphod flee again, this time to the First Class compartment. Here, a man introduces himself to Zaphod as Zarniwoop, whom Zaphod had been seeking since Fit the Seventh.

Arthur kills the last Allitnil, the anti-clone, while Marvin ties up Poodoo and Varntvar, leaving them forced to listen to a cassette tape of Marvin's autobiography. As they finally exit the Dolmansaxlil building, they set out for the same spaceport that Ford and Zaphod are in, but then discover that the suspended cup is heading towards the surface, with the Heart of Gold still inside.

Meanwhile, Zarniwoop has offered Ford and Zaphod some drinks, and attempts to explain the whole situation to them. Zarniwoop starts by explaining that they had been in an artificially created universe within his office, then explains that he and Zaphod had co-conspired to discover who was really ruling the galaxy, as it was obvious it was not the President. Zaphod succeeds in his task, bringing the Heart of Gold – its improbability drive being necessary to reach the realm of the real ruler of the galaxy – to Zarniwoop's hiding place. Zarniwoop begins "dismantling" the artificial universe, and causes the cup to head to the surface outside.

After the narrator describes who might be ruling the universe, we hear the voice of an old man attempting to feed his cat a bit of fish. This old man seems to have his own unique perspective on things, but had noticed a white ship approaching. This ship, the Heart of Gold, discharges four of its passengers: Ford, Zaphod, Arthur and Zarniwoop, who approach the old man's shack. They attempt to question him about the decisions he makes about the galaxy, but he gives everything a vague answer. He does however reveal that he may have given his assent to the men who regularly seek his advice, thus giving Zaphod permission, under the pressure of the galaxy's psychiatrists, to destroy Earth before the Ultimate Question was revealed, thus securing their jobs. Arthur leaves angrily. Zarniwoop attempts further questions, but is eventually brushed off, and it's discovered that Arthur has made away with the Heart of Gold, with Lintilla and Marvin aboard. This leaves Ford, Zaphod and Zarniwoop stranded on the "Old Man in the Shack"'s planet, and here the episode ends – though open-ended with a spoken possibility of another series.

== Casting in both series ==
As the first episode was originally commissioned as a pilot, much of the casting was done by Adams and Simon Brett, his original radio producer. Brett departed the BBC after the pilot episode was recorded, and so casting suggestions and decisions were made by Adams and Geoffrey Perkins for the remainder of both series. Perkins, using Brett's original notes, remarks that three or four people were auditioned for the part of the narrator, in search of a "Peter Jones-y sort of voice" before Peter Jones himself was actually contacted. Perkins also describes the casting of Simon Jones, Geoffrey McGivern, Jo Kendall, Bill Wallis and many others throughout the book containing the original radio series scripts.

Adams's own notes on the casting of Peter Jones ("who can we get to do a Peter Jonesey voice?"), Stephen Moore ("Stephen would find the character immediately and would make it really excellent"), Mark Wing-Davey ("He played a guy [in The Glittering Prizes] who took advantage of people and was very trendy"), David Tate ("He was one of the backbones of the series. We had him there every week"), Richard Vernon ("He's so funny. He carved himself a niche playing all sort of grandfatherly types"), Susan Sheridan ("Susan never found anything major to do with the role, but that wasn't her fault, it was my fault") and Roy Hudd ("To this day he still claims he doesn't know what it was all about") can be found in Neil Gaiman's book Don't Panic: The Official Hitch-Hiker's Guide to the Galaxy Companion.

== Airdates ==
The programme was aired on BBC Radio 4, on the following dates:

- 1978 First–Sixth: 8 March – 12 April; repeated 23 April – 28 May; and 1 November – 6 December; Seventh: 24 December; repeated 26 December
- 1979 Seventh: 8 April; First–Sixth: 1 July – 5 August; Seventh: 24 December
- 1980 Eighth–Twelfth: 21–25 January; repeated 24 February – 23 March
- 1981 Ninth: 7 January; First–Twelfth: 7 April – 12 June
- 1983 First–Twelfth: 27 March – 12 June, plus Seventh: 5 April
- 1984 Seventh–Twelfth: 24–29 December

=== US airdates ===
In 1980 a few American radio stations had broadcast the series (and a hardback was released in October), and the programme was finally broadcast in stereo by US National Public Radio in March 1981, prior to the first US book's paperback release in October of the same year. The episodes aired on NPR were not the complete episodes heard in the UK—they were edited down from their original 29+ minute running time to 25–26 minutes.
