= The Hitchhiker's Guide to the Galaxy Tertiary to Hexagonal Phases =

Third to sixth series of the radio version of The Hitchhiker's Guide to the Galaxy

The Tertiary Phase, Quandary Phase, Quintessential Phase and Hexagonal Phase are respectively the third, fourth, fifth and sixth series of The Hitchhiker's Guide to the Galaxy radio series. Produced in 2003, 2004 and 2018 by Above the Title Productions for BBC Radio 4, they are radio adaptations of the third, fourth, fifth and sixth books in Douglas Adams' The Hitchhiker's Guide to the Galaxy series: Life, the Universe and Everything; So Long, and Thanks For All the Fish; Mostly Harmless and And Another Thing....

These radio series consisted of a total of twenty episodes, following on from the twelve episodes from the original two series (the Primary and Secondary Phases) which originally aired in 1978 and 1980.

The producers chose not to continue the ordinal sequence established by the Primary, Secondary and Tertiary phases. If they had done so, the fourth, fifth and sixth series would have been termed quaternary, quinary and senary. Humorously, they chose:

- For "quaternary": "Quandary", which means "dilemma"
- For "quinary": "Quintessential", which today means "the most perfect example of something" (although the original meaning of quintessential was "fifth element")
- For "senary": "Hexagonal", which refers to hexagonal phases

== The Tertiary Phase ==
The Hitchhiker's Guide to the Galaxy: Tertiary Phase, based on Life, the Universe and Everything, ran on BBC Radio 4 from Tuesday 21 September to 26 October 2004, with repeats on the following Thursdays. Episodes were subtitled "Fit the Thirteenth" through "Fit the Eighteenth". The third novel was adapted by Dirk Maggs, John Langdon and Bruce Hyman following instructions left by Adams.

Most of the original radio series cast returned, with the exception of three, due to their deaths: Richard Vernon (died 1997) as Slartibartfast, replaced by Richard Griffiths; Peter Jones (died 2000), replaced by his friend William Franklyn, with some brief excerpts from Jones' original narration used in Fit the Thirteenth of the radio series disguised as the Book's speech-generation system changing as part of updates to the Guide from the publisher; David Tate (died 1996), who played a multitude of minor roles in the two original radio series including Eddie, the Heart of Gold's computer. Bill Wallis, who played the roles of Mr Prosser and Prostetnic Vogon Jeltz in the original series, was not available. Toby Longworth took the role of Jeltz in the new series. On the other hand, John Marsh, who was the original series' continuity announcer, returned to announce the credits. There was even a cameo role by Adams himself (who had died in 2001) as Agrajag, edited from his BBC audiobook recording of the novel.

The original novel was based on a treatment that Adams wrote for an unmade Doctor Who movie, Doctor Who and the Krikkitmen. The idea was re-proposed during Tom Baker's tenure in the title role, and again for a potential (but unmade) second television series of The Hitchhiker's Guide to the Galaxy.

Before the final episode was broadcast, BBC Worldwide released the Tertiary Phase on CD, including additional material. A DVD of the series was released on 2 October 2006 in the UK. This marks the first commercial release of any BBC radio programme in a 5.1 surround mix. The disc contains as extras: the full version of the Krikkit Song, a photogallery, the original online and radio trailers, the appearance of the series on Pick of the Week, and thirty minutes of behind the scenes video in five short segments.

Since the opening of the third book starts at the same place and time (prehistoric Earth) as the opening of the second radio series, the entire Secondary Phase was dismissed as one of Zaphod's "psychotic episodes" (including events that did take place in the books). Hints, however, were interspersed in the subsequent fourth and fifth series that would ultimately tie all five together. The UK edition of the novel was used for the adaptation—this becomes evident in Fit the Sixteenth, when the "Rory" award is said to be given for the Most Gratuitous Use Of The Word Fuck In A Serious Screenplay. The US edition of the same novel substituted "Belgium" for "fuck", as well as the explanation for why the former word is considered to be devastatingly rude in the rest of the galaxy, which is drawn from Fit the Tenth of the Secondary Phase. The broadcast version avoids saying "fuck" on radio by well-timed crashes and explosions—the CD version moves these so that the "fuck" is audible.

=== Fit the Thirteenth ===
- Broadcast on BBC Radio 4, 21 September 2004

Cast:
- The Book: Peter Jones and William Franklyn
- Arthur Dent: Simon Jones
- Wowbagger (and Vogon Captain, uncredited): Toby Longworth
- Ford Prefect: Geoffrey McGivern
- Trillian: Susan Sheridan
- Zaphod Beeblebrox: Mark Wing-Davey
- Marvin the Paranoid Android: Stephen Moore
- Eddie the Computer: Roger Gregg
- Zem the Mattress: Andy Taylor
- Announcer: John Marsh

Arthur wakes up in a cave on pre-historic Earth (thus ignoring the events of the Secondary Phase), on the day, four years after he last saw Ford Prefect, that Ford arrives back. Ford carries news that he has detected disturbances in the "space-time wash", and that they might be able to escape. The disturbance turns out to be an old sofa, which materialises in a field. They chase the sofa as it runs off, and then are transported elsewhere.

Zaphod and Trillian are on the Heart of Gold, without Marvin. Zaphod is extremely hung over, and upset that Trillian is dismissing the events of The Secondary Phase as a "psychotic episode". Trillian wishes to do something and is getting increasingly annoyed at Zaphod. After preparing a fabulous meal, and Zaphod still refusing to come out of the bathroom, she teleports away, telling the ship to "transport me the hell out of Zaphod Beeblebrox's life."

Meanwhile, Marvin is on a swamp on Sqornshellous Zeta, conversing with the native life-forms, mattresses. He is circling around and around on one leg, while his artificial (i.e. replacement) leg is stuck in the swamp.

=== Fit the Fourteenth ===
- Broadcast on BBC Radio 4, 28 September 2004

Cast:
- The Book: William Franklyn
- Arthur Dent: Simon Jones
- Ford Prefect: Geoffrey McGivern
- Marvin the Paranoid Android: Stephen Moore
- Krikkit Robots: Dominic Hawksley
- Slartibartfast: Richard Griffiths
- Zem the Mattress: Andy Taylor
- Walkie Talkie: Fiona Carew
- The Boy: Theo Maggs
- Wowbagger: Toby Longworth
- Deodat: Bruce Hyman
- Henry Blofeld: Himself
- Fred Trueman: Himself
- Announcer: John Marsh

Arthur and Ford arrive at Lord's Cricket Ground on the sofa that they had caught in the previous episode. They have arrived in the final Test match in the Ashes, in the middle of the field. A policeman apprehends them, and they retire to the pavilion.

Watching the match, Arthur drinks some tea and glances upon a newspaper. He notices the date on the newspaper, and realises that it was from the day before the Earth was demolished. A ball lands in Arthur's bag, and when the fielder comes to collect it, Arthur decides to keep it.

With the planet about to be demolished again, they then look for another lift from the planet. They discover a spaceship, hidden by a "Somebody Else's Problem field", hidden behind a screen.

The game finishes, with England winning the Ashes, and Slartibartfast joins Arthur and Ford. Slartibartfast explains that he has arrived because "something terrible is about to happen". He walks to the centre of the cricket pitch, and asks to be given the Ashes saying that they are "vitally important for the past, present and future safety of the Galaxy".

Another spaceship arrives. Eleven white robots, carrying bats, and wearing rocket pads on their shins (dressed like cricketers), come suddenly out, and start attacking the spectators and players with their bats, using them to hit grenade-like explosives at the humans present. They take the Ashes, say "we declare", and go back into their ship. Ford and Arthur catch a lift with Slartibartfast on his ship.

Meanwhile, Marvin is once again making conversation with a mattress. A similar ship to before arrives, and white robots get out and take Marvin's one remaining leg. After a brief while, they return and decide to take all of Marvin instead.

=== Fit the Fifteenth ===
- Broadcast on BBC Radio 4, 5 October 2004

Cast:
- The Book: William Franklyn
- Arthur Dent: Simon Jones
- Ford Prefect: Geoffrey McGivern
- Slartibartfast: Richard Griffiths
- Zaphod Beeblebrox: Mark Wing-Davey
- Wikkit Voice: Dominic Hawksley
- Agrajag: Douglas Adams
- Eddie the Computer: Roger Gregg
- Judiciary Pag: Rupert Degas
- Krikkit Man One (and Mancunian Correcting-Fluid Magnate, uncredited): Michael Fenton Stevens
- Krikkit Man Two (and Krikkit song by): Philip Pope
- Krikkit Man Three: Tom Maggs
- Henry Blofeld: Himself
- Fred Trueman: Himself
- Announcer: John Marsh

Slartibartfast shows Ford and Arthur an Informational Illusion about the Krikkit Wars and the Wikkit Gate, and that the game of cricket on Earth is a "racial memory" of the Wars. Investigating further, they discover that the Krikkitmen, a previously peaceful people, built their first spaceship in a year, after a spaceship landed on their planet. The planet and its sun had been previously obscured in a dust cloud that left the Krikkitmen unaware of the existence or even possibility of existence of stars. It is considered remarkable that they constructed a working ship in just a year. After they saw the rest of the universe existed, they decided to annihilate it.

Meanwhile, on the Heart of Gold, Zaphod Beeblebrox hears the noise of thousands of people saying "Wop". He intercepts them on the bridge, where he is told they want the "Golden Bail", the ship's Infinite Improbability Drive. They take it, shoot him, and leave.

Back on Slartibartfast's ship, Ford and Arthur watch the Krikkit War Crimes Trial, presided over by Judiciary Pag. Pag's sentence is that Krikkit will be locked in an envelope of "Slo-Time", until the universe has ended, when it will be released, thus saving the universe from attack from Krikkit, and allowing Krikkit to exist in isolation after the end of the universe. However, a Krikkit ship escaped.

Slartibartfast notes that parts of the key to the Wikkit Gate, sealing the envelope of Slo-Time, have been re-appearing. After a failed attempt to recover the Wooden Pillar (the Ashes), Slartibartfast plans to go to a party, to locate the Silver Bail. Ford disagrees with this objective but agrees with the concept of going to a party. They teleport from the ship.

Arthur does not materialise with Ford and Slartibartfast, but elsewhere, in a gloomy room, with signs such as "DO NOT BE ALARMED. BE VERY VERY FRIGHTENED, ARTHUR DENT". The episode ends on a cliff-hanger, with the previously unintroduced character of Agrajag saying "Bet you weren't expecting to see me again."

The episode includes several Guide interludes, notably the story of Lallafa the poet, and a description of Brockian Ultra-Cricket.

=== Fit the Sixteenth ===
- Broadcast on BBC Radio 4, 12 October 2004

Cast:
- The Book: William Franklyn
- Arthur Dent: Simon Jones
- Ford Prefect: Geoffrey McGivern
- Slartibartfast: Richard Griffiths
- Trillian: Susan Sheridan
- Thor: Dominic Hawksley
- Agrajag: Douglas Adams
- Award winner: Bob Golding
- Woman with the Sydney Opera House Head: Joanna Lumley
- Party Doorman: Paul Wickens
- Announcer: John Marsh

The episode begins with Arthur, who has been "diverted" by Agrajag, who claims that Arthur has killed previous incarnations of him hundreds of times. He also claims to have been the bowl of petunias that materialised into existence in Fit the Third. Eventually it transpires one of the deaths was at Stavromula Beta, where someone tried to assassinate Arthur, and he ducked, hitting Agrajag. Arthur however has never been there. Agrajag cries "I've brought you here too zarking soon", but decides to attempt to kill Arthur anyway.

Arthur and Agrajag struggle, and Agrajag dies. Arthur escapes from the Cathedral of Hate, to which he had been diverted, by running into a passageway in the mountain. He notes that he has somehow ended up with the wrong bag—one he lost on Earth many years ago. He trips, and falls, only to discover that he is flying. He experiments with flying for a while, only to be hit in the small of the back by the party which Ford and Slartibartfast are attempting to enter.

The party is flying as well, and Ford and Slartibartfast are on a ledge around the building, not being permitted entry due to the lack of a bottle. Arthur remembers that his bag contains a bottle of Retsina, and this gets them entry. They see Trillian and Thor at the party, where Thor is chatting Trillian up.

They quiz people trying to find the Silver Bail, and discover that it has been instantiated as an award (a Rory) for the Most Gratuitous Use Of The Word Fuck In A Serious Screenplay. Before they are actually able to find it, the Krikkit robots appear, massacre the party-goers and take the Silver Bail.

Arthur tricks Thor into walking out of the building by challenging him to fight, leaving Trillian with no choice but to come with them. The Krikkitmen now have all the parts of the Wikkit Key, and Slartibartfast notes that their next move must be to go to the Wikkit Gate itself and try to intervene.

=== Fit the Seventeenth ===
- Broadcast on BBC Radio 4, 19 October 2004

Cast:
- The Book: William Franklyn
- Arthur Dent: Simon Jones
- Ford Prefect (and Hactar, in flashbacks, uncredited): Geoffrey McGivern
- Trillian: Susan Sheridan
- Zaphod Beeblebrox: Mark Wing-Davey
- Marvin the Paranoid Android: Stephen Moore
- Krikkit Commander: Dominic Hawksley
- Slartibartfast: Richard Griffiths
- Eddie the Computer: Roger Gregg
- Dispatcher (and Silastic Armorfiends, uncredited): Bob Golding
- Krikkit Man One: Michael Fenton Stevens
- Krikkit Man Two: Philip Pope
- Announcer: John Marsh

The episode opens with a Guide entry about the Silastic Armorfiends, a very aggressive species, who apparently were the first race ever to shock a computer, by asking it (Hactar) to design the "Ultimate Weapon". Hactar designed one, a small bomb which would destroy every sun in the universe by connecting them in hyperspace. However, it turned out to be a dud, because Hactar had decided that any possible consequence of making it a dud would be better than it actually being used. The Silastic Armorfiends were unimpressed with this and destroyed Hactar, and later themselves.

Arthur’s clique arrive at the asteroid, but too late to do anything but watch. The Krikkit robots place the key into the Wikkit Gate, revealing Krikkit. As the robots from the escaped Krikkit ship leave their ship, they notice that Zaphod Beeblebrox is with them, who gets knocked out by the Krikkitmen, who then proceed to actually destroy the lock. Zaphod explains that they had brought him on their ship, but had not killed him; but not for any obvious reason.

Zaphod comes with the others on Slartibartfast's ship, where Slartibartfast announces that they have no choice but to go down to the surface of Krikkit. Arthur had recovered two items—the Golden Bail, in order to allow the Heart of Gold to work once more, and more importantly, the Ashes of the Wooden Pillar. Zaphod returns to the Heart of Gold, and asks Trillian whether she wishes to come with him; she declines.

Arthur, Ford, Trillian and Slartibartfast finally land on Krikkit, where they notice that there are hundreds of floating buildings and warships above the surface. They are soon apprehended by some Krikkitmen, who ask them if they are aliens. The Krikkitmen ask them about the "balance of nature". They express concern that the plan of universal destruction would upset the balance of nature, and also would stop them from having sporting links with the rest of the Galaxy.

The leader of the group, in private, explains to Trillian they have a bomb, that can destroy everything that exists, and cries about this. Aware of the cliche, Trillian asks him to "take me to your leader", who resides "up there" in the sky, far away from the Krikkitmen on the surface.

Meanwhile, the others notice that the Heart of Gold is visible in the war zones above the planet. Zaphod sneaks into one of the floating buildings, where he finds the original starship that crash-landed on Krikkit. He recognises it instantly as a fake, designed to teach a non-spacefaring race how spaceships work. He later overhears a conversation between two Krikkit officers, and that apparently the robots are getting depressed and do fiendishly difficult quadratic equations instead of fighting. The episode ends with Zaphod over-hearing Marvin sing a depressing song.

=== Fit the Eighteenth ===
- Broadcast on BBC Radio 4, 26 October 2004

Cast:
- The Book: William Franklyn
- Arthur Dent: Simon Jones
- Ford Prefect: Geoffrey McGivern
- Zaphod Beeblebrox: Mark Wing-Davey
- Trillian: Susan Sheridan
- Marvin the Paranoid Android: Stephen Moore
- Elder of Krikkit: Dominic Hawksley
- Slartibartfast: Richard Griffiths
- Eddie the Computer: Roger Gregg
- Krikkit Civilian: Bob Golding
- Wowbagger: Toby Longworth
- Henry Blofeld: Himself
- Fred Trueman: Himself
- Prak: Chris Langham
- Hactar: Leslie Phillips
- Announcer: John Marsh

Ford, Arthur and Slartibartfast are on the surface of Krikkit, prisoners of the Krikkitmen, and waiting for Trillian to get back, or for Zaphod to do something.

Zaphod has discovered Marvin, who since he was stolen by the Krikkit robots, has been plugged into the Krikkit mainframe and is being used as its central computer, hence depressing the robots, and making them unable to kill Zaphod. Marvin shows Zaphod CCTV of Trillian talking to the Elders of Krikkit.

Trillian is explaining that Krikkit's history is a sequence of contrived coincidences that was set up in order to provoke a race into wanting to destroy the universe. She points out their ultimate weapon, the supernova bomb, would destroy Krikkit as well, and that they ought to know that if they'd built it themselves instead of taking instructions from Hactar. A robot (independent from Marvin) detonates the bomb, only for it to turn out to be a dud.

Arthur, Ford, Marvin, Slartibartfast, Trillian and Zaphod all return to the Heart of Gold, just outside the dust cloud. A pocket of pseudo-gravity has opened with an oxygen atmosphere, and Arthur and Trillian exit the airlock into it.

There, they meet Hactar, who explains that when the Silastic Armorfiends tried to destroy him, they failed, and because of his cellular nature, he was eventually able to coalesce sufficiently to influence things. In the long years he grew to regret his decision to make the bomb a dud. He created the dust cloud around Krikkit and also the fake wrecked spacecraft that provoked them to develop spaceflight. He knows they are going to destroy them, and they do. His final words are "I have fulfilled my function..."

They have in the mean-time picked up a man named Prak, who was a witness at a trial when the Krikkit robots broke in and stole the Perspex Pillar. The robots jogged the arm of the person administering him truth drugs, and he took a huge overdose. He was then told to tell "the truth, the whole truth, and nothing but the truth"—a horrifying fate. The court-house was abandoned, with him in place.

He has apparently stopped telling it ("there not nearly as much of it as people imagine"), but is still finding much of it, particularly frogs and Arthur Dent, hilarious. They ask him if he knows the Question to the Ultimate Answer of 42. He explains that knowledge of the Question and the Answer are mutually exclusive and that if both were to be known the universe would be replaced by something more bizarre and inexplicable. However, he does have the address of God's Last Message to his Creation, which he gives to them, but before Arthur is able to take down the address, Prak dies.

After this, they return to Lord's Cricket Ground, on Earth, after the Krikkit robot attack, to return the Ashes. In the destruction, Arthur is unable to find anyone to return the Ashes to. He notes that he is at Lord's, and one of his ambitions was always to bowl at Lord's. He still has the ball he caught last time he was there, he decides to bowl the ball at the batsman standing at the wicket.

Mid-run, Ford points out that "it's not an England batsman, it's a Krikkit robot", and that the ball is probably a supernova bomb, and not a dud. He finds himself unable to stop running and bowls anyway. It goes wide, and Ford catches the ball, the universe being saved by Arthur's poor bowling. Arthur decapitates the robot with its own bat, and then expresses his desire for a cup of tea.

== Radio series four and five ==
A fourth and fifth series based on So Long, and Thanks For All the Fish and Mostly Harmless respectively follow. The names for these series were chosen because they sound "less daunting, more memorable and are a bit easier to spell" than the standard terms quaternary and quinary.

While these were treated as the fourth and fifth Hitchhiker's Guide radio series, they were broadcast in one eight-week stretch in May and June 2005. The tradition of "Fits" continues; these were known as Fit the Nineteenth through Fit the Twenty-Sixth. The manner of broadcasting these episodes carries over from the Tertiary Phase: the original broadcast was on Tuesday, with a Thursday repeat (with the exception of Fit the Nineteenth, which was not repeated due to election coverage). After the initial Tuesday broadcast, audio streams of the episode were available until the following Tuesday. For these final phases, the core cast (Simon Jones, Geoffrey McGivern, Mark Wing-Davey, Susan Sheridan and Stephen Moore) returned, along with William Franklyn as the new voice of The Book (assisted by Rula Lenska). In addition, David Dixon, Sandra Dickinson, Bill Paterson, Roy Hudd and Jonathan Pryce, who had roles in the TV adaptation or the original radio series, all returned, though Dixon and Paterson both play new roles.

The "Quandary Phase" was released in a 2-CD set in late May 2005. The CDs contain material not present in the original transmissions, due to time constraints. The enclosed booklet contains notes from Dirk Maggs, Simon Jones, Bruce Hyman and Helen Chattwell. A 2-CD release of the "Quintessential Phase" was released in mid-June 2005, with similar material left out of the original transmissions, and notes in the booklet by the same four individuals.

== The Quandary Phase ==
Front cover of the BBC Audio release of the "Quandary Phase" (Fits 19-22) of The Hitchhiker's Guide to the Galaxy.

=== Fit the Nineteenth ===
- Broadcast on BBC Radio 4, 3 May 2005

Cast:
- The Book: William Franklyn
- The Book's "Update" voice (uncredited): Rula Lenska
- Arthur Dent: Simon Jones
- Ford Prefect: Geoffrey McGivern
- Rob McKenna: Bill Paterson
- Fenchurch (Fenny): Jane Horrocks
- Barman: Arthur Smith
- Russell: Rupert Degas
- Vogon Guard (and Alien Teaser, uncredited): Bob Golding
- Stewardess: Alison Pettitt
- Hooker: Fiona Carew]m
- Vogon Helmsman: Michael Cule
- Evil-looking bird/Canis Pontiff: Chris Emmett
- Vogon Captain: Toby Longworth
- Announcer: John Marsh

Arthur discovers that the entry for "Earth" in the Hitchhiker's Guide to the Galaxy, which formerly had been edited down to "Mostly Harmless", has been replaced, with Ford's original full version. They head towards Earth independently, Arthur arriving first. After landing in a field in Somerset, Arthur tries to hike a lift to Cottington, to see if his house still exists. Along the way, he meets Rob McKenna, a man who complains about the rain, before realising he has hitched a lift the wrong way. He gets out, and gets a lift with Russell, whose sister, Fenchurch, is out cold on a back seat of the car. Arthur is instantly smitten, and asks about her. Russell claims that she is mad, and has been ever since "the hallucinations"—the Vogon Constructor Fleet.

On the Constructor Fleet, a junior crew member notices that Earth has re-appeared. He is overridden by the captain, Jeltz, who declares that he saw it destroyed himself.

Meanwhile, Ford is stuck in a bar with a large bill, which he avoids paying by promising to write an entry for the bar in the Guide. On the streets, he is asked by a hooker whether he is "rich", and says that he might be—being owed several years back pay for writing two words. He shows the two words—"Mostly Harmless"—to the hooker, and is shocked to see the guide updating this to his full entry. He decides to go to Earth himself.

=== Fit the Twentieth ===
- Broadcast on BBC Radio 4, 10 May 2005

Cast:
- The Book: William Franklyn
- Arthur Dent: Simon Jones
- Ford Prefect: Geoffrey McGivern
- Rob McKenna: Bill Paterson
- Fenchurch: Jane Horrocks
- Raffle Woman: June Whitfield
- BT Operator/Barmaid/News Anchor 2: Ann Bryson
- Jim (Bartender)/News Anchor 1: Simon Greenall
- Speaking Clock: Brian Cobby
- Ecological Man/Zirzla Leader: David Dixon
- Arthur's BBC Boss: Geoffrey Perkins
- Announcer: John Marsh

Arthur arrives at his house, finding it undemolished and the phone ringing. He is unable to get to the phone before it rings off. The contents of the house are as he left them, apart from a large pile of junk mail just inside the front door, and a strange bowl, bearing the inscription "So Long and Thanks for All the Fish". He phones his boss at the BBC to explain that he has been absent due to going mad and would return to work when hedgehogs come out of hibernation (plus a few minutes to have a shave).

Driving, he encounters Fenchurch again, and gives her a lift to the train station, saying that he has something he wants to tell her. At the station pub they attempt to engage in conversation, but are interrupted by someone offering raffle tickets. Fenchurch has to leave to catch her train, and leaves her phone number on a ticket—with which Arthur then wins the raffle.

Distraught, Arthur decides to find the Islington cave that he spent some years in during prehistoric times. He knocks on a few doors in Islington near where he thinks that cave was, firstly calling at Friends of the World. When there he attempts to make a donation to "save the dolphins" but is met with mockery from the "Ecological Man" (played by David Dixon, Ford Prefect from the television series. There is a brief allusion to the TV series as Arthur asks if they've met before). The next door he knocks on is Fenchurch's. She is surprised that he didn't call first, shows him his misplaced copy of the Guide, and notes that they need to talk.

=== Fit the Twenty-First ===
- Broadcast on BBC Radio 4, 17 May 2005

Cast:
- The Book: William Franklyn
- Arthur Dent: Simon Jones
- Ford Prefect: Geoffrey McGivern
- Fenchurch: Jane Horrocks
- Murray Bost Henson: Stephen Fry
- East River Creature: Jackie Mason
- Vogon Councillor: Dominic Hawksley
- Steward: Simon Greenall
- Mrs Kapelsen: Margaret Robertson
- Vogon Clerk: Michael Cule
- Prostetnic Vogon Jeltz: Toby Longworth
- Wonko the Sane (John Watson): Christian Slater
- Announcer: John Marsh

Fenchurch tells Arthur about her revelation at the time of the Vogon fleet's visit. At her urging, Arthur figures out that her feet do not touch the ground, leading him to suspect that she also can fly, and to a romantic tryst on the wing of a Heathrow-bound airplane.

Curious about the dolphins' fate, Arthur and Fenchurch head to California to visit Wonko the Sane, a scientist considered the foremost expert on the species. Wonko, who lives in an inside-out house called "The Outside of the Asylum" and claims to have had conversations with green-winged angels, tells Arthur and Fenchurch that they all received the same glass bowls—farewell gifts from the dolphins that, when pinged, play their final message to humans.

Meanwhile, a Vogon inquiry reveals that Earth's location in a plural zone means that any destroyed version is highly likely to be replaced by an alternate one. The Vogons decide that all Earths must still be destroyed, even though the bypass project has been cancelled.

The music that plays when Arthur determines that Fenchurch can fly, and again during the end credits, is strongly reminiscent of the style of Dire Straits. The book, "So Long, and Thanks for all the Fish", says that Arthur and Fenchurch listened to Dire Straits on a Walkman cassette player, with two sets of headphones, while flying together (inspired by the music that Douglas Adams listened to whilst writing the book).

=== Fit the Twenty-Second ===
- The final episode in the adaptation of So Long, and Thanks For All the Fish.
- Broadcast on BBC Radio 4, 24 May 2005

Cast:
- The Book: William Franklyn
- Arthur Dent: Simon Jones
- Ford Prefect: Geoffrey McGivern
- Rob McKenna: Bill Paterson
- Fenchurch: Jane Horrocks
- Tricia McMillan: Sandra Dickinson
- Marvin the Paranoid Android: Stephen Moore
- The Lajestic Vantrasheel of Lob: Bob Golding
- Stewardess: Alison Pettitt
- Speaking Clock: Brian Cobby
- Nick Clarke: Himself
- Charlotte Green: Herself
- Peter Donaldson: Himself
- Sir Patrick Moore: Himself
- Announcer: John Marsh

Fenchurch and Arthur return to England, to discover that a large spaceship has landed in Knightsbridge, London, bringing Ford Prefect with it. Fenchurch, Arthur and Ford leave on the ship. Arthur begins to suspect that this is not the Earth he and Ford knew—there is a "Tricia McMillan" on the news, with an American accent and blonde hair (voiced by Sandra Dickinson, who played Trillian in the TV series), but otherwise identical to the Trillian who left his earth with Zaphod Beeblebrox. Fenchurch and Arthur go to see God's Final Message to His Creation, and bump into Marvin, who is also en route to see it. Marvin is now 37 times older than the universe itself, and needs assistance to read the message, which turns out to be "WE APOLOGISE FOR THE INCONVENIENCE". Declaring that he thinks he feels good about the message, Marvin dies.

This is followed by an event only mentioned in Mostly Harmless. Fenchurch asks Arthur to show her the universe. However, on a commercial liner flight, Fenchurch disappears, and the ship's crew deny she ever existed...

At the conclusion of the show's credits, a tie-in website is announced: McKenna's All-Weather Haulage.

== The Quintessential Phase ==
Front cover of the BBC Audio release of the "Quintessential Phase" (Fits 23-26) of The Hitchhiker's Guide to the Galaxy.

The Quintessential Phase has one sub-plot of Zaphod attempting to reach Zarniwoop (which did occur in Fit the Twelfth, but that version was dismissed during the Tertiary Phase as Zaphod having a "psychotic episode"—another version of events occurs here, in an attempt to interconnect all five series). Zarniwoop has been merged with the character Vann Harl from Mostly Harmless. This radio series also sees the return of the characters of Max Quordlepleen, Thor, and Zarquon (who all appeared in Fit the Fifth at Milliways), and also Mr Prosser, from Fit the First. None of these characters appear in the book version of Mostly Harmless.

The start of some of the plot threads from Mostly Harmless were introduced in the Quandary Phase (though they did not appear in So Long, and Thanks for All the Fish)—notably the Vogons discovering that Earth had re-appeared and resolving to destroy all versions of it, Arthur having sold his DNA, a mention that Trillian now has a child and is now a reporter. Also the final episode saw the introduction of an alternate version of Trillian, still known as Tricia McMillan, who is identical to the original Trillian except for being blonde and American. This alternate McMillan is played by Sandra Dickinson, who played Trillian in the television series.

The events at the end of this series are referenced in the latest Hitchhiker book, And Another Thing... by Eoin Colfer, where the dream sequence the Hitchhiker's Guide Mk.2 puts Trillian into involves the Babel Fish teleporting her and the other main characters away from the destroyed Earth to Milliways, similar to one of the endings. Van Harl is also mentioned as Zarniwoop Van Harl, among other nods to the radio series such as a reference to Brontitall and the bird people from the Secondary Phase that were never put into the novels.

=== Fit the Twenty-Third ===
- Broadcast on BBC Radio 4, 31 May 2005

Cast:
- The Book: William Franklyn
- Voice of the Bird: Rula Lenska
- Arthur Dent: Simon Jones
- Ford Prefect: Geoffrey McGivern
- Zaphod Beeblebrox: Mark Wing-Davey
- Trillian: Susan Sheridan
- Tricia McMillan: Sandra Dickinson
- Zarniwoop Vann Harl: Jonathan Pryce
- Eddie the Computer: Roger Gregg
- Grebulons: Andy Taylor and Michael Fenton Stevens
- Prophet: John Challis
- Information Creature: Mitch Benn
- Gail Andrews: Lorelei King
- Colin the Robot: Andrew Secombe
- Announcer: John Marsh

The episode opens with a Grebulon spaceship suffering an accident, and losing nearly all records of what it is and what it should be doing, along with the crew's memories of why. Based on what little remains of their orders, they land on the tenth planet from the Sun, and start to 'monitor' Earth.

After a year's travelling Arthur has returned to the co-ordinates ZZ9 plural Z alpha—where he is expecting to find Earth, and perhaps Fenchurch. In its place, he finds a barely colonised planet called NowWhat, although with the right continents for Earth. The creature at the information desk explains that beings from a "plural" region are not advised to travel in hyperspace due to the risk of slipping in dimensions. He is directed to Hawalius, a planet of oracles.

During a flashback, the introduction between Trillian and Zaphod Beeblebrox is revealed. But on a parallel Earth, an American and blonde Tricia McMillan (who was left behind by her universe's Zaphod) is interviewing Gail Andrews, an astrologer, about the effect that the recently discovered planet Persephone (nicknamed Rupert) will have on astrology. The Grebulons, monitoring this, have an idea.

Later, Andrews and McMillan talk. Andrews has sensed that McMillan is unhappy about the stars, and McMillan reveals that she met an alien (Zaphod Beeblebrox) at a party once (a variation of the previous flashback ensues), but didn't get to go with him because she fetched her bag. She also reveals that she just missed out on a TV job in New York City because she did not go back to fetch her bag.

Meanwhile, Zaphod (who does not appear in the book) is attempting to meet Zarniwoop once more, convinced that the Total Perspective Vortex (from Fit the Eighth) was not just his imagination. He has arrived at Saquo-Pilia Hensha, the new location of the offices for The Hitchhiker's Guide to the Galaxy. He sneaks into the building pretending to deliver pizza, and goes to the editor's office. He meets Zarniwoop Vann Harl, who promises to explain matters.

The story turns back to Arthur, who has arrived at Hawalius. He is told by an oracle that prophecy is a dead business now, due to news reports from the future using time travel. He is given a piece of free advice—"it'll all end in tears, probably already has", and sent on his way to the next cave.

Back at the Hitchhiker's building, Ford is also sneaking in. He climbs into the building through the ventilation system, disables a security robot (which he dubs "Colin") by hardwiring it to be happy all the time, and then gets it to cover his entrance to the editor's office, finding out along the way that the Guide has been taken over and is no longer owned by Megadodo Publications. He too manages to get into the editor's office and finds that Vann Harl has been expecting Ford. The episode ends here on a cliff-hanger.

=== Fit the Twenty-Fourth ===
- Broadcast on BBC Radio 4, 7 June 2005

Cast:
- The Book: William Franklyn
- Voice of the Bird: Rula Lenska
- Arthur Dent: Simon Jones
- Ford Prefect: Geoffrey McGivern
- Zaphod Beeblebrox: Mark Wing-Davey
- Zarniwoop Vann Harl: Jonathan Pryce
- Old Man on the Pole: Saeed Jaffrey
- Smelly Photocopier Woman: Miriam Margolyes
- Tricia McMillan: Sandra Dickinson
- Stewardess: Lorelei King
- Colin the Robot: Andrew Secombe
- Accountancy Bird and Lift: Roger Gregg
- Grebulon Underling: Philip Pope
- Grebulon Lieutenant and Accountancy Bird: Michael Fenton Stevens
- Accountancy Bird: Danny Flint
- Announcer: John Marsh

Arthur is still trying to gain advice on the planet Hawalius, but when he finally leaves the planet, the spaceship he's on develops "a major glitch" just as they jump into hyperspace. Meanwhile, on Earth, Tricia McMillan agrees to go with the Grebulons and work out a system of astrology that would be valid on the planet Persephone (Rupert), in exchange for exclusive rights to the story.

Back in The Guide's offices, Zarniwoop Vann Harl, the new editor of the guide, asks Ford to be his restaurant critic. He explains that there is a new Guide, aimed at families rather than hitchhikers, and they plan to make one and sell it in billions of billions of alternate worlds. Ford steals the Dine-a-Charge and Ident-i-Eze cards from him, then hacks into the accountancy system. The universe there is equated with the artificial universe inside Zarniwoop's office, and Ford discovers Zaphod, in a shack by the beach, claiming he has been there on his own for a month. Zaphod claims that the Presidency and the Krikkitmen were just a distraction, and that they have "shrunk the Vortex and given it the voice of that Lintilla chick" in order to create the new Guide. The episode ends with Ford going to floor 23, and being forced to jump out of a window, in order to escape from Zarniwoop Vann Harl, who is revealed to be a disguised Vogon.

=== Fit the Twenty-Fifth ===
- Broadcast on BBC Radio 4, 14 June 2005

Cast:
- The Book: William Franklyn
- Voice of the Bird: Rula Lenska
- Arthur Dent: Simon Jones
- Ford Prefect: Geoffrey McGivern
- Trillian: Susan Sheridan
- Tricia McMillan: Sandra Dickinson
- Random Dent: Sam Béart
- Old Thrashbarg: Griff Rhys Jones
- Strinder and Doctor: Roger Gregg
- Grebulon Leader: Andy Taylor
- The Patient: Lorelei King
- Grebulon Lieutenant: Michael Fenton Stevens
- Colin the Robot: Andrew Secombe
- Prostetnic Vogon Jeltz: Toby Longworth
- Speaking Clock: Brian Cobby
- Announcer: John Marsh

Arthur Dent has, since the last episode, settled on the planet his ship crash-landed on, Lamuella, which is partly in a "plural zone". He is occupied as The Sandwich Maker, making sandwiches for the inhabitants of a village from the meat of the Perfectly Normal Beast. Perfectly Normal Beasts are rather like bison, and migrate.

A messenger brings news to the Sandwich Maker that a spaceship has landed on the planet. When Arthur approaches it, he is surprised to see Trillian disembark. Trillian explains that the crash was known about, but nobody has been to rescue him for insurance reasons. She explains that she had a daughter, named Random, using sperm sold by Arthur, and has come to drop off her daughter (of indeterminate age due to time travel, but probably around 16), whilst she is off covering a war.

At the Hitchhiker's Guide building, Ford saves himself by using Colin's antigravity systems to get to a ledge on the 13th floor of the building. He bypasses the rocket-proof glass by unlatching the window. Colin notes that the rocket-proof glass was installed after the Frogstar attack on the building (in Fit the Seventh), which Ford knows nothing about.

Meanwhile, on Lamuella, Random is not settling in well. Born on a spaceship going from one place to another place, she doesn't consider anywhere home, and Earth, the world both her parents are from, has been destroyed. A robot courier arrives with a package, for Ford Prefect care of Arthur Dent, which Arthur decides to keep safely closed on the basis that anything that involves Ford Prefect is dangerous. Distraught at her lack of place in the universe, Random runs off with the package into the forest, which is considered haunted by the natives of Lamuella.

Random discovers that the holo-entertainment system from the rocket ship that Arthur Dent crash landed in, which is still functional, as the source of the "hauntings". She opens the package, revealing the Guide Mark II, in the form of a black bird. The Bird explains the nature of probability and that some alternative Earths do exist, and persuades Random to go to one of them. Random challenges the Bird to get her a spaceship there, and just at that moment, one lands. She downs the pilot with a well-thrown rock, and leaves Lamuella.

The alternate Tricia McMillan has been taken to Rupert and meets the Grebulon leader, who explains their problem of having forgotten everything, and their reasoning in trying to gain purpose through astrology. Meanwhile, Arthur has been looking for Random and has seen the spaceship. Searching the forest he stumbles onto the pilot of the ship, Ford Prefect.

=== Fit the Twenty-Sixth ===
- The final episode in the adaptation of Mostly Harmless
- Broadcast on BBC Radio 4, 21 June 2005

Cast:
- The Book: Peter Jones and William Franklyn
- Voice of the Bird (and Lintilla, uncredited): Rula Lenska
- Arthur Dent: Simon Jones
- Ford Prefect: Geoffrey McGivern
- Zaphod Beeblebrox: Mark Wing-Davey
- Trillian: Susan Sheridan
- Tricia McMillan: Sandra Dickinson
- Random: Sam Bèart
- Marvin the Paranoid Android: Stephen Moore
- Fenchurch: Jane Horrocks (uncredited)
- Old Thrashbarg: Griff Rhys Jones
- Bartender: Roger Gregg
- Vogon Helmsman: Michael Cule
- Thor: Dominic Hawksley
- Grebulon Leader: Andy Taylor
- Prostetnic Vogon Jeltz and Wowbagger: Toby Longworth
- Grebulon Lieutenant: Mike Fenton Stevens
- Elvis: Philip Pope
- The Newsreader: Neil Sleat
- Max Quordlepleen: Roy Hudd
- Runner: Tom Maggs
- Agrajag: Douglas Adams
- Announcer: John Marsh

The episode opens with Ford and Arthur on Lamuella. Ford explains about the new guide and its ability to use Reverse Temporal Engineering in order to arrange circumstances for the benefit of its user. Ford's spaceship itself he obtained by jumping from a building and falling into it, its previous occupant having accidentally pressed the wrong sort of eject button. Tracing back, he discovered that a trail of coincidences led back to the new Guide, which was responsible. With Random stealing the ship and the Bird, they are stuck, with no immediate way to get offworld to prevent the Vogons from doing whatever it is they intend to do. They decide that the Perfectly Normal Beasts are the best way off the planet. The migration has already started, and this sees them appear at one point, run past Lamuella, and then disappear again, evidence of a dimensional shift. Old Thrashbarg helps them slow a Perfectly Normal Beast long enough for them to get onto it, and tells them that they will be entering the Domain of the King.

On the alternate Earth, Tricia McMillan has returned from Rupert, and is lamenting that none of the footage she has taken is usable. She is interrupted by a member of the hotel staff, telling her that a spaceship has landed in Regent's Park, and the young girl on the ship is demanding to see her. Meanwhile, the Grebulon leader is still unhappy. Whilst they now have horoscopes, he now knows that unless he takes positive action, then due to the Earth rising, he will have a very bad month. He decides to investigate the possible astrological uses of the Grebulon's gun turrets.

Arthur and Ford arrive at the Domain of the King Bar and Grill, which has numerous spaceships outside of it, including a large pink one. Inside, they have a couple of bacon rolls, whilst Ford buys the pink spaceship from the bar singer, Elvis Presley. They then depart for Earth. After arriving, they find that Tricia McMillan has taken Random to a club, and go there themselves. A strange man confronts Arthur, and says "I told you not to come here!" Arthur and Ford find Random, along with Tricia and Trillian (who had arrived in the meantime on a third spaceship). Random is holding a gun and threatening to shoot. Trillian explains they must leave the planet immediately, as the Grebulons (a missing spaceship from the war she was sent to cover) are about to destroy the planet, once again.

Arthur explains it is impossible for him to die (and hence for the planet to be destroyed), but the strange man goes for Random's gun and she ends up shooting him. Trillian points out the name of the club to Arthur—Stavro Müller Beta—while Arthur realizes the strange man is Agrajag. Arthur accepts his fate, and the Earth is destroyed...

==== Epilogue ====
An updated edition of the Guide notes that Babel fish share the ability of the dolphins in shifting sideways in probability when required, bringing their host and sometimes other people in the vicinity with them, and notes that this in fact has happened. The Guide shares the fate of Arthur in two alternate realities: the first, continuing from the end of Fit the Twelfth, sees Arthur and Lintilla and several of her clones aboard the Heart of Gold; the second sees Arthur from the beginning of the story, this time battling Prosser over the fate of his home, with Fenchurch now lying with him in front of the bulldozer.

The Guide then details the true reality of what happened: the Babel Fish brought Arthur, Ford, Random, Zaphod and Trillian (now merged with Tricia) to Milliways, the Restaurant at the End of the Universe, Table 42. Zaphod discovers Marvin was still under warranty and has been restored to physical health, and is once again parking cars at Milliways, albeit with a promotion, and Arthur discovers the waitress serving their table is Fenchurch, who has been at Milliways waiting for him to turn up. As Wowbagger the Infinitely Prolonged arrives to insult the Great Prophet Zarquon, making his perennial appearance on the Milliways stage, Wowbagger's immortality is rescinded, and he dies. Elsewhere in the universe, Prostetnic Vogon Jeltz, having finally destroyed the Earth after all this time, is able to tick the box on his orders and move on. Reunited, Arthur promises to take Fenchurch flying.

== The Hexagonal Phase ==
On Thursday 8 March 2018, 40 years to the day of the first series' original broadcast in 1978, a sixth series dubbed the "Hexagonal Phase" began broadcasting on BBC Radio 4. This series was based on the sixth novel And Another Thing... by Eoin Colfer and featured members of both the original radio and television casts.

Cast:

- The Voice of the Book: John Lloyd
- Arthur Dent: Simon Jones
- Ford Prefect: Geoffrey McGivern
- Zaphod Beeblebrox: Mark Wing-Davey
- Trillian/Tricia McMillan: Sandra Dickinson
- Trillian: Susan Sheridan
- Random: Samantha Béart
- Jeltz/Wowbagger: Toby Longworth
- Constant Mown/Eddie the computer: Andy Secombe
- Left Brain/Thor: Mitch Benn
- Fenchurch: Jane Horrocks
- Hillman Hunter: Ed Byrne
- Cthulu: Jon Culshaw
- Marvin/Gag Halfrunt: Jim Broadbent
- The Guide Mk II: Professor Stephen Hawking
- The Consultant: Lenny Henry
- Heimdall/Barzoo/Buckeye Brown/Eccentrica/Gunner Vogon: Tom Alexander
- Aseed Preflux/Sub-Etha voice/HOG Door: Philip Pope
- Modgud/The Viking: Theo Maggs
- Baldur: Phillipe Bosher
- Announcer: John Marsh
- Directed and adapted by Dirk Maggs
- Produced by Dirk Maggs, Helen Chattwell and David Morley
- Based on Douglas Adams and Eoin Colfer
