= Primary Phase =

Primary phase can refer to:

- Materials science, see Liquidus temperature
- The Hitchhiker's Guide to the Galaxy Primary and Secondary Phases, a radio series
