= Geoffrey McGivern =

British actor and comedian

- Born: Geoffrey M. McGivern; Balham, Wandsworth, England
- Other name: Geoff McGivern
- Occupations: Actor; Comedian
- Years active: 1974–present

Geoffrey McGivern is a British actor and comedian, having performed in film, television, radio, and stage extensively over the last five decades. He is best known for his portrayals of Ford Prefect in The Hitchhiker's Guide to the Galaxy.

== Career ==
McGivern played Ford Prefect in the radio series (1978–80) and subsequent LP releases of The Hitchhiker's Guide to the Galaxy by Douglas Adams whom he knew from Cambridge University, and reprised the role for the four new series broadcast on BBC Radio 4 between 2004 and 2018. A more recent radio broadcast was in The Ape That Got Lucky and he has appeared in TV shows such as Noel's House Party, Press Gang, Chef!, Big Train, Blackadder the Third ("Dish and Dishonesty") as Ivor Biggun, Chelmsford 123, Jonathan Creek, 15 Storeys High, Armstrong and Miller, Toast of London and series three of Peep Show.

McGivern appeared in the first series of the comedy show Big Train in 1998 and later that year for the 1998 radio SciFi drama Paradise Lost in Cyberspace (Colin Swash, BBC) McGivern teamed up with old Hitchhiker's colleague Stephen Moore and Lorelei King (member of cast in the 2005 Hitchhiker's radio show sequel). He later played the Supreme Ruler in BBC2's sci-fi comedy Hyperdrive (2006–2007).

In 2007, he appeared in the BBC Radio 4 comedy Peacefully in Their Sleeps and in 2008 he appeared as Professor John Mycroft in the BBC2 science sitcom Lab Rats and in the 2008 BBC series Little Dorrit where he played Mr Rugg. He also appeared in episode 5 of series 3 of the TV series A Bit of Fry and Laurie.

In 2015, he guest-starred in EastEnders as Dickie Ticker, the crude comic brought in by Mick Carter for Kush Kazemi's stag night. In 2016, he appeared in four episodes of the Disney Channel musical drama The Lodge as Patrick. McGivern played the narrator Charlie Swinburne in the BBC Radio's 2013 six part dramatisation of G. K. Chesterton's The Club of Queer Trades.

In 2017, he appeared in the Channel 4 sitcom Back, written by Simon Blackwell, alongside David Mitchell and Robert Webb. Later that year, he began portraying the recurring role of Frank in the Netflix series Free Rein.

From 2019 to 2023, he appeared as recurring character Barclay Beg-Chetwynde in the BBC sitcom Ghosts and reprised the role in its 2026 film continuation,Ghosts: The Possession of Button House.In 2022, he appeared as the main character Russ, in Radio 4 comedy No-Platformed. The show's episode guide contains a humorous note about McGivern's extensive credit list, by starting a list of his credits and then adding "oh, hundreds of things".

In 2024, he appeared as recurring character Lord Rookwood in the Apple TV+ series The Completely Made-Up Adventures of Dick Turpin. He also returned to EastEnders as Gerald.
