= Trillian (character) =

Last remaining woman, in The Hitchhiker's Guide to the Galaxy

- Sandra Dickinson as Trillian from the TV adaptation
- First appearance: Fit the Second (radio)
- Created by: Douglas Adams
- Portrayed by: Sandra Dickinson (TV & radio); Zooey Deschanel (film); Susan Sheridan (radio); Cindy Oswin (LP)

In-universe information
- Species: Human
- Gender: Female
- Children: Random Dent

Tricia Marie McMillan, also known as Trillian Astra, is a fictional character from Douglas Adams' series The Hitchhiker's Guide to the Galaxy. She is most commonly referred to simply as "Trillian", a modification of her birth name, which she adopted because it sounded more "space-like". According to the movie version, her middle name is Marie. Physically, she is described as "a slim, darkish humanoid, with long waves of black hair, a full mouth, an odd little knob of a nose and ridiculously brown eyes," looking "vaguely Arabic."

== Biography ==
Tricia McMillan is a mathematician and astrophysicist whom Arthur Dent attempted to talk to at a party in Islington. She and Arthur next meet six months later on the spaceship Heart of Gold, shortly after the Earth has been destroyed to make way for a hyperspace bypass. The trilogy later reveals that Trillian eventually left the party with Zaphod Beeblebrox, who, according to the Quintessential Phase, is directly responsible for her nickname.

In the radio series, she is carried off and forcibly married to the President of the Algolian Chapter of the Galactic Rotary Club and consequently does not appear in the second radio series at all. The later radio series (the Tertiary Phase and beyond) reveal this (probably) occurred only in the artificial universe within the Guide offices. In the books, which the third, fourth and fifth series follow, she saves the universe from the Krikketeers and later becomes a Sub-Etha Radio reporter under the name Trillian Astra.

Some drafts of the movie's screenplay, and Robbie Stamp's "making of" book covering the movie, state that Trillian was to be revealed as half-human, an acknowledged divergence from Douglas Adams' original storyline. This would have been done in order to underline the loneliness of Arthur Dent, the only fully homo sapien life form remaining in the universe, after Earth's demolition. This idea was scrapped after the "making of" book was written, and the scene revealing Trillian's heritage (by the mice, to Arthur, on the Earth Mark II) was re-written. An interview with actress Zooey Deschanel, included on the DVD version, has her mention that Trillian is half-human, suggesting the interview was recorded prior to the change of plan.

== Relationships ==
In the novels and radio series, Trillian does not have a romantic relationship with Arthur (although when Arthur starts seeing Fenchurch, Ford Prefect asks him what happened to Trillian). In the fifth book, Trillian is revealed as the mother of Random Dent. It is unclear for how long (if ever) Trillian had a relationship with Zaphod. They seem to travel away from each other after the third book, although in the fourth one Arthur states Trillian is with Zaphod, and in the fifth Trillian implies that she had not had a child with Zaphod simply because they were different species. In the sixth novel, And Another Thing..., she pursues a relationship with Wowbagger, the Infinitely Prolonged; she accuses Arthur of carrying a torch for her as well.

The 2005 film puts a different spin on the character. The main emotional arc of the movie is a love triangle between Trillian, Zaphod, and Arthur. Trillian is initially attracted to Arthur when she meets him on Earth, but she is disappointed by his apparent lack of spontaneity. During their travels, Trillian discovers that Zaphod may be the more superficially exciting choice, but Arthur is the man who truly cares about her, Arthur commenting when he is about to have his head cut open by the mice that his feelings for Trillian are the only thing that he ever had questions about where the answer made him happy. The film concludes with Arthur and Trillian sharing a brief kiss as they prepare to return to the Heart of Gold with Ford and Zaphod as Slartibartfast plans to restart Earth and Arthur concluding that he is ready to move on from the planet now that there is a world to come back to.

== Portrayals ==
Trillian was played on radio by Susan Sheridan, on television by Sandra Dickinson (who also reprised an alternate-universe version of the role in the fifth and sixth radio series, playing both original and alternate-universe versions in the latter), on the Original Records LP version by Cindy Oswin, and in the 2005 film by Zooey Deschanel. In The Illustrated Hitchhiker's Guide to the Galaxy, she is portrayed by Tali, a model.

In the original radio series, she is portrayed with an English accent – in both the TV series and movie she is played as an American. The "Quintessential Phase" of the radio series features Sandra Dickinson in the role of the alternate version of Tricia McMillan as a "blonder and more American" Trillian – the radio series indicates that the character is otherwise identical to the first Trillian and was born in the United Kingdom. In the book Mostly Harmless, it is said that both the alternate Tricia McMillan and Trillian have an English accent. In The Hitchhiker's Guide to the Galaxy novel, she is described as follows: "She was slim, darkish, humanoid, with long waves of black hair, a full mouth, an odd little knob of a nose and ridiculously brown eyes. With her red head scarf knotted in that particular way and her long flowing silky brown dress, she looked vaguely Arabic." She has consistently not been portrayed as such in the television and film adaptions, although the film adaptation Trillian is closer to her appearance in the books than it was in the television series.

== Appearances ==
Trillian comes closest of all female characters to appearing in the entire "Hitchhiker's" saga.

=== Novels ===
- The Hitchhiker's Guide to the Galaxy
- The Restaurant at the End of the Universe
- Life, the Universe and Everything
- So Long, and Thanks for All the Fish (mentioned only)
- Mostly Harmless (also alternate Tricia McMillan)
- And Another Thing... (also alternate Tricia McMillan)

=== Radio ===
The Hitchhiker's Guide to the Galaxy radio series

Featuring Susan Sheridan as Trillian:

- Primary Phase: "Fit the Second", "Fit the Third", "Fit the Fourth", "Fit the Fifth", "Fit the Sixth"
- Tertiary Phase: "Fit the Thirteenth", "Fit the Sixteenth", "Fit the Seventeenth", "Fit the Eighteenth"
- Quintessential Phase: "Fit the Twenty-Third", "Fit the Twenty-Fifth", "Fit the Twenty-Sixth"

Featuring Sandra Dickinson as the alternate character Tricia McMillan:

- Quintessential Phase: "Fit the Twenty-Fourth", "Fit the Twenty-Fifth", "Fit the Twenty-Sixth"

Featuring Sandra Dickinson as Trillian and Tricia McMillan:

- "The Hexagonal Phase"

=== LP ===
Featuring Cindy Oswin as Trillian

- The Hitchhiker's Guide to the Galaxy
- The Restaurant at the End of the Universe

=== Television ===
Featuring Sandra Dickinson as Trillian

- Episode 2
- Episode 3
- Episode 4
- Episode 5
- Episode 6

=== Computer game ===
- The Hitchhiker's Guide to the Galaxy

=== Film ===
Featuring Zooey Deschanel as Trillian

- The Hitchhiker's Guide to the Galaxy
