= Mark Wing-Davey =

British actor and director (born 1948)

- Born: 30 November 1948 (age 77); London, England
- Education: Woolverstone Hall School
- Alma mater: Cambridge University
- Occupations: Actor; director
- Years active: 1974–2013
- Spouse: Anita Carey (m. 2002; died 2023)
- Children: 2
- Mother: Anna Wing

Mark Wing-Davey (born 30 November 1948) is a British actor and director. He portrayed Zaphod Beeblebrox in the radio and television versions of The Hitchhiker's Guide to the Galaxy.

== Early life ==
The son of actor Peter Davey and actress Anna Wing, Wing-Davey attended Woolverstone Hall School in Suffolk before studying English at Gonville and Caius College, Cambridge, where he was a member of the Footlights between 1967 and 1970.

In February 1968, he performed with Nick Drake at Lady Mitchell Hall, University Of Cambridge. Wing-Davey played violin in the string section accompanying Drake on Robert Kirby's orchestral arrangements of his songs.

== Career ==
He had a featured role in the 1976 miniseries The Glittering Prizes. This role was later cited by Geoffrey Perkins as the likely reason for his being cast in arguably his most memorable role, that of the two-headed Galactic President, Zaphod Beeblebrox, in the radio and TV versions of The Hitchhiker's Guide to the Galaxy, written by Douglas Adams. He played a barrister in some episodes of the ITV television series Crown Court, King Henry V in Episode 3 of James Burke's Connections, a record company executive in the film Breaking Glass (1980) and an accountant in Absolutely Fabulous.

In the 1983 television production of Alan Bennett's An Englishman Abroad, Wing-Davey played Prince Hamlet in the re-enactment of the Shakespeare Memorial Theatre's 1958 tour of Hamlet to Moscow. His theatre credits include James Stock's Star-Gazy Pie and Sauerkraut (Royal Court Theatre, 1995) and Caryl Churchill's Mad Forest, for which he won an Obie award. He was the first Artistic Director of The Actors Centre, London.

In 2003, he returned to the role of Zaphod Beeblebrox for the Above the Title production of the Hitchhiker's Guide Tertiary to Quintessential Phase radio dramas for BBC Radio 4. More recently he has provided the voice of Judge Ghis in the English version of Final Fantasy XII. Wing-Davey directed the off-Broadway production of Unconditional by Brett C. Leonard at The Public Theater. It was put up by Philip Seymour Hoffman's theater group, LAByrinth Theater Company, of which he is a member. It opened in February 2008.

In May 2008, New York University's Tisch School of the Arts announced that Wing-Davey had been named Chairman of, and arts professor in, the School's Graduate Acting Program. He reprised the role of Zaphod Beeblebrox in 2012 for a live tour of The Hitchhiker's Guide to the Galaxy. Also in 2012, Wing-Davey directed the world premiere of Brett C. Leonard's "Ninth and Joanie" in a LAByrinth Theater Company production. In 2013, he directed William Shakespeare's Pericles, Prince of Tyre at Berkeley Repertory Theatre.

== Personal life ==
In 1973, while working as a theatre company member in Sheffield, he met actress Anita Carey. The two began living together the following year after they appeared in a production together. They got married in 2002. The pair had two children together. Carey died in 2023.
