= Arthur Dent =

Character in The Hitchhiker's Guide to the Galaxy

Arthur Philip Dent
- Simon Jones as Arthur Dent in the first episode of the BBC TV series
- First appearance: Fit the First (radio)
- Created by: Douglas Adams
- Portrayed by: Simon Jones (all adaptations save for stage and film); Chris Langham (stage show); Martin Freeman (film)

In-universe information
- Nicknames: The sandwich-maker, Monkey-Man
- Species: Human
- Gender: Male
- Occupation: BBC Radio employee (formerly) Intergalactic traveller "Sandwich-maker"
- Children: Random Dent

Arthur Philip Dent is a fictional character and the hapless protagonist of the comic science fiction series The Hitchhiker's Guide to the Galaxy by Douglas Adams.

In the radio, LP and television versions of the story, Arthur is played by Simon Jones (not to be confused with Peter Jones, the voice of the guide). In Ken Campbell's 1979 stage production, Chris Langham took the part. In the 2005 film adaptation, he is played by Martin Freeman. In The Illustrated Hitchhiker's Guide to the Galaxy, he is portrayed by Jonathan Lermit.

== Arthur's story ==
Along with Ford Prefect, Arthur Dent barely escapes from Earth as it is demolished to make way for a hyperspace bypass. Arthur spends the next several years, still wearing his dressing gown, helplessly launched from crisis to crisis while trying to straighten out his lifestyle. He rather enjoys tea, but seems to have trouble obtaining it in the far reaches of the galaxy. In time, he learns how to fly and carves a niche for himself as a sandwich-maker.

In most versions of the series, Arthur and Ford eventually find themselves back on Earth, but two million years in the past, marooned with a third of the Golgafrincham population (consisting of hairdressers, account executives, film-makers, security guards, telephone sanitisers, and the like). The Golgafrincham arrival spurs the extinction of the native "cavemen" (although, as Ford Prefect pointed out, they did not live in caves, to which a witty repartee was that they 'might have been getting their caves redecorated'), resulting in the human race's eventual replacement by a shipload of middle managers, telephone sanitisers and hairdressers.

The original radio series and the television series end at this point, although a second radio series was made in which Ford and Arthur are rescued by Ford's cousin Zaphod Beeblebrox and have further adventures, and which ends with Arthur stealing Zaphod's spaceship, the Heart of Gold (which Zaphod had himself stolen) and striking out with only Marvin the Paranoid Android, Eddie the shipboard computer, a cloned archaeologist named Lintilla, a bunch of appliances with Genuine People Personalities, and a rather battered copy of the Hitchhiker's Guide to the Galaxy for companionship.

In the novels and the new (series 3 and onwards) radio series (the latter of which dismisses the events of the second radio series as one of Zaphod's "psychotic episodes"), Ford and Arthur escape prehistoric Earth via an eddy in the space-time continuum and a time-travelling Chesterfield sofa that deposits them in the middle of Lord's Cricket Ground at the climax of the final (in more ways than one, it turns out) match in the Ashes series, the day before the destruction of Earth by the Vogons. Having escaped the destruction of Earth once more and survived further adventures, Arthur eventually finds himself once more back on Earth (or rather an alternative Earth founded by the Dolphins to save the human race from extinction). Here he falls in love with a woman named Fenchurch and seems set to live happily ever after – at least until the following – and final – novel, Mostly Harmless. By the end of this fifth novel, Earth and all of its possible permutations and alternate versions are destroyed once and for all, and everybody dies, at least as far as the novel goes. However, it is subtly hinted that Arthur, his friends, and a few Earths might have survived.

In the Quintessential Phase of the radio series, there are multiple alternative endings after the final destruction of all possible Earths. The final ending here consists of the Babel fish carried by Arthur, Trillian, Ford, and Random having a sense for self-preservation, i.e. at the last minute they teleport the person they are inhabiting, and anyone nearby (namely Tricia McMillan), to safety. They are teleported to Milliways where they meet up with Zaphod, both Trillians merge, leaving her with her British accent but her blonde-American hair. Marvin has been rebuilt as his warranty has yet to expire and is parking cars at Milliways again (he has been promoted, he remarks; he now has his own bucket). Finally, they meet up with Fenchurch again who was teleported to Milliways after we last saw her in the Quandary Phase and has been working as a waitress there, waiting for Arthur. They all settle in together, leaving the series on an upbeat note and allowing for further adventures.

In the latest book, And Another Thing..., it is revealed that there are other Arthur Dents in the different dimensions of the book series, but they are all deceased, due to various mishaps of fate, so that only the Arthur who was rescued from Earth remains. One briefly appears in the book, wearing Arthur's traditional dressing gown and slippers, and is destroyed with the rest of Earth by the Grebulons. Ford almost sees him, but searches for a drink and misses him being vaporized.

== Arthur's "death" ==
Arthur dies in the fifth installment of the book series, Mostly Harmless, in a club called Beta (owned by Stavro Mueller) when the Earth and all its duplicates are seemingly destroyed by the Grebulons. Adams frequently expressed his disdain for this ending in retrospect, claiming that it was too depressing and came about as the result of him having a bad year.

In the radio series, Arthur is saved by the Babel Fish, which can teleport itself, along with its carrier, out of danger. Arthur and the others who died in the books are instead teleported by their Babel Fishes to somewhere safer than Sector ZZ9 Plural Z Alpha. This is also used in Trillian's dream sequence, as the reason for their escape.

In And Another Thing..., written by Eoin Colfer, Arthur is put into a dream sequence (presumably referring to the epilogue of the radio series) and then frozen in time by the Guide Mk.2, allowing him to experience decades of life on a peaceful beach. The Guide's batteries soon run out, however, so all the main characters are re-awakened on the exploding Earth, at the exact point where Mostly Harmless left off. Zaphod then rescues them in the Heart of Gold. All alternative Arthurs are killed. In the end, Arthur travels through hyperspace on an interstellar passenger ship; he looks to the seat next to him to find Fenchurch sitting there talking to him, but he fades out of her dimension and into a new one. Materializing on the beach from his dream, he looks into the sky and discovers that the Vogons are on their way to destroy this planet.

== See also ==
- Asteroid 18610 Arthurdent
- Quintessential Phase
