= Zaphod Beeblebrox =

Fictional character in The Hitchhiker's Guide to the Galaxy

- Mark Wing-Davey as Zaphod Beeblebrox, from the TV adaptation
- First appearance: Fit the Second (radio)
- Created by: Douglas Adams
- Portrayed by: Mark Wing-Davey (all except film); Sam Rockwell (film)

In-universe information
- Species: Betelgeusian
- Gender: Male
- Title(s): President Zaphod Beeblebrox I Zaphod Beeblebrox the Nothingth (as addressed by great-grandfather)
- Occupation: Ex-Galactic President; confidence trickster; etc
- Relatives: Ford Prefect (semi-half cousin); Zaphod Beeblebrox II (father); Zaphod Beeblebrox III (grandfather); Zaphod Beeblebrox IV (great-grandfather); Mrs Alice Beeblebrox (favourite mother)

Zaphod Beeblebrox (/ˈzeɪfɒd ˈbiːbəlbrɒks/) is a fictional character in the comic science fiction series The Hitchhiker's Guide to the Galaxy by Douglas Adams.

He is from a planet in the vicinity of Betelgeuse, and is a "semi-half-cousin" of Ford Prefect, with whom he "shares three of the same mothers". Because of "an accident with a contraceptive and a time machine", his father, grandfather, and great-grandfather are actually his direct descendants (see Zaphod Beeblebrox the Fourth).

== Appearance ==
This character is described across all versions as having two heads and three arms, though explanations of how he came to receive the extra appendages differs between versions. The original radio version never explained the second head, but did explain that Zaphod "grew" the third arm in the six months between meeting the character of Trillian on Earth, and the start of the series. The third radio series implies that he had a third arm when growing up – the fifth has him offer to Trillian that "I'd grow my third arm back for you, baby", when they first meet. In the novel, he said the third arm was "recently ... fitted just beneath his right one to help improve his ski-boxing." According to the original Hitchhiker's radio series script book, an ad libbed comment by Mark Wing-Davey in the eighth radio episode ("Put it there, and there, and there, and there! Whoa!") would suggest that Zaphod had grown a fourth arm. In the television series, Ford Prefect simply remarks to Zaphod that "the extra arm suits you." Eoin Colfer wrote and published an official 6th book for the Hitchhiker's series, in which it is implied Zaphod's third arm may have originally been grown so that he would have one hand for each of Eccentrica Galumbits's breasts.

In Infocom's text adventure game version of the story, Zaphod blends in on Earth by hiding his second head in a covered bird cage (an alternate Trillian also refers to this in Mostly Harmless). In the novel The Restaurant at the End of the Universe, the ghost of Zaphod's great-grandfather also has two heads. This and other information presented in the narrative prose seem to indicate that having two heads is a common – possibly even universal – trait of Zaphod's species.

For the 2005 film, it is hinted that Zaphod "created" the second head himself when shutting off the parts of his mind that contain portions of his personality that "are not presidential", but he wanted to keep these traits, so he hid his second head under his neck and wears a large collar or scarf to keep it hidden. As such, the film is also the only version that explains the second head. In this filmed version, the second head appears underneath the first, roughly between his chin and the top of his chest, popping up when the first head is flipped backwards. The third arm is hidden underneath Zaphod's clothing, appears to be controlled by the second head, and only appears a few times, such as for tormenting Arthur Dent, piloting the spaceship Heart of Gold, or preparing a Pan-Galactic Gargle Blaster. The second head was sawed off by Humma Kavula during the film.

In And Another Thing..., Colfer's addition to the book series, a photo is mentioned which shows Zaphod with the second head replaced by that of a woman. It is implied that Zaphod may have surgically attached this woman's head to himself, before realising he liked the idea of a second head better than he liked her, and swapping her for a reproduction of his original head.

And Another Thing... is also the only book in the series in which Zaphod has only one head. His left head is said to have been removed so that 'Left Brain' (or 'LB') can function as the new computer of the Heart of Gold.

Zaphod wears unique clothing that contains a mixture of bright and contrasting colours to make him stand out and be the centre of attention wherever he goes. In the television series, he wears the same outfit throughout each of the episodes; however, in the film, his clothes, their style and their colour scheme change several times.

== Achievements ==
Zaphod invented the Pan Galactic Gargle Blaster. He was voted "Worst Dressed Sentient Being in the Known Universe" seven consecutive times. He has been described as "the best Bang since the Big One" by Eccentrica Gallumbits, and as "one hoopy frood" by others. In the seventh episode of the original radio series, the narrator describes Beeblebrox as being the "owner of the hippest place in the universe" (his own left cranium), as voted on in a poll of the readers of the fictional magazine Playbeing.

He was briefly the President of the Galaxy (a role that involves no power whatsoever, and merely requires the incumbent to attract attention so no one wonders who is really in charge, a role for which Zaphod was perfectly suited). He is the only man to have survived the Total Perspective Vortex, though it was established (in the books and first two radio series) that he survived only because he was in an Electronically Synthesised Universe created especially for him, thus making him the most important being in that universe and thus uniquely equipped to survive its version of the Vortex. His brain-care specialist, Gag Halfrunt, also said, "Vell, Zaphod's just zis guy, you know?" He used his position as President of the Galaxy to steal the Heart of Gold, a spaceship taking advantage of Infinite Improbability Drive, at its unveiling.

Early in Zaphod's career (whilst heading The Beeblebrox Salvage and Really Wild Stuff Corporation) he joined forces with the Safety and Civil Reassurance Administration to investigate the loss of the Starship Billion Year Bunker, on which were stored compounds so powerful a teaspoonful could blow up/infect/irradiate a whole planet, and by-products of The Sirius Cybernetics Corporation synthetic personalities programme.

== As a character ==
As a character, Zaphod is hedonistic and irresponsible, self-centered almost to the point of solipsism, and often extremely insensitive to the feelings of those around him. In the books and radio series, he is nevertheless quite charismatic which causes many characters to ignore his other flaws. Douglas Adams claimed that he based Zaphod on an old friend of his from Cambridge University called Johnny Simpson, who "had that nervous sort of hyperenergetic way of trying to appear relaxed."

In (at least) the books, he is, according to screening tests that he ran on himself in the Heart of Gold's medical bay, "clever, imaginative, irresponsible, untrustworthy, extrovert, nothing you couldn't have guessed" (Ultimate Hitchhiker's Guide, page 98). In the movie, however, he is not very bright, and perhaps even more boorish than his previous portrayals. He is portrayed as a vacuous California surfer-type, and Sam Rockwell, the actor who played him in the film, cited Bill Clinton, Elvis Presley and George W. Bush as influences. Zaphod in the film is very much immature (in contrast to the books where he was immature, but had a lot of power and was smart and devious), acting very eager about everything, eating messily with his hands, throwing temper tantrums, and doing things without reason, such as pressing the Improbability Drive button just because it was large and shiny.

Throughout the book and radio versions of the story, Zaphod is busy carrying out some grand scheme, has no clue as to what it is and is unable to do anything but follow the path that he laid out for himself. Zaphod's grand schemes have included, over time, a second-hand ballpoint pen business (which may or may not have been established with the help of Veet Voojagig). He was forced to section off portions of both brains that stored the plan so that scans of his mind, which would be necessary for him to become president, would not reveal his plan, which included his being President of the Galaxy and subsequently stealing the prototype Infinite Improbability Drive starship. However, in his altered state of mind he follows the path he left only reluctantly and very much wishes to go off and lie on beaches rather than see the scheme through. In the second radio series and the book version of The Restaurant at the End of the Universe, we learn (and so does Zaphod) that the object of his plan was to find the man who actually ruled the universe – who turns out to be a man living in a shack with his cat who does not believe anything is real or certain except that which he is seeing and hearing at that moment.

In the 1986 prequel story "Young Zaphod Plays It Safe," Zaphod is working as a salvage ship operator, hired by a bureaucratic organization to retrieve the sunken wreck of a starship that had been carrying extremely dangerous materials intended for disposal in a black hole. Since this story is set at a time before his decision to run for President of the Galaxy, he displays a noticeably different personality, exhibiting concern over the hazards posed by the cargo to himself, the crew, and living creatures in general.

== In non-print media ==
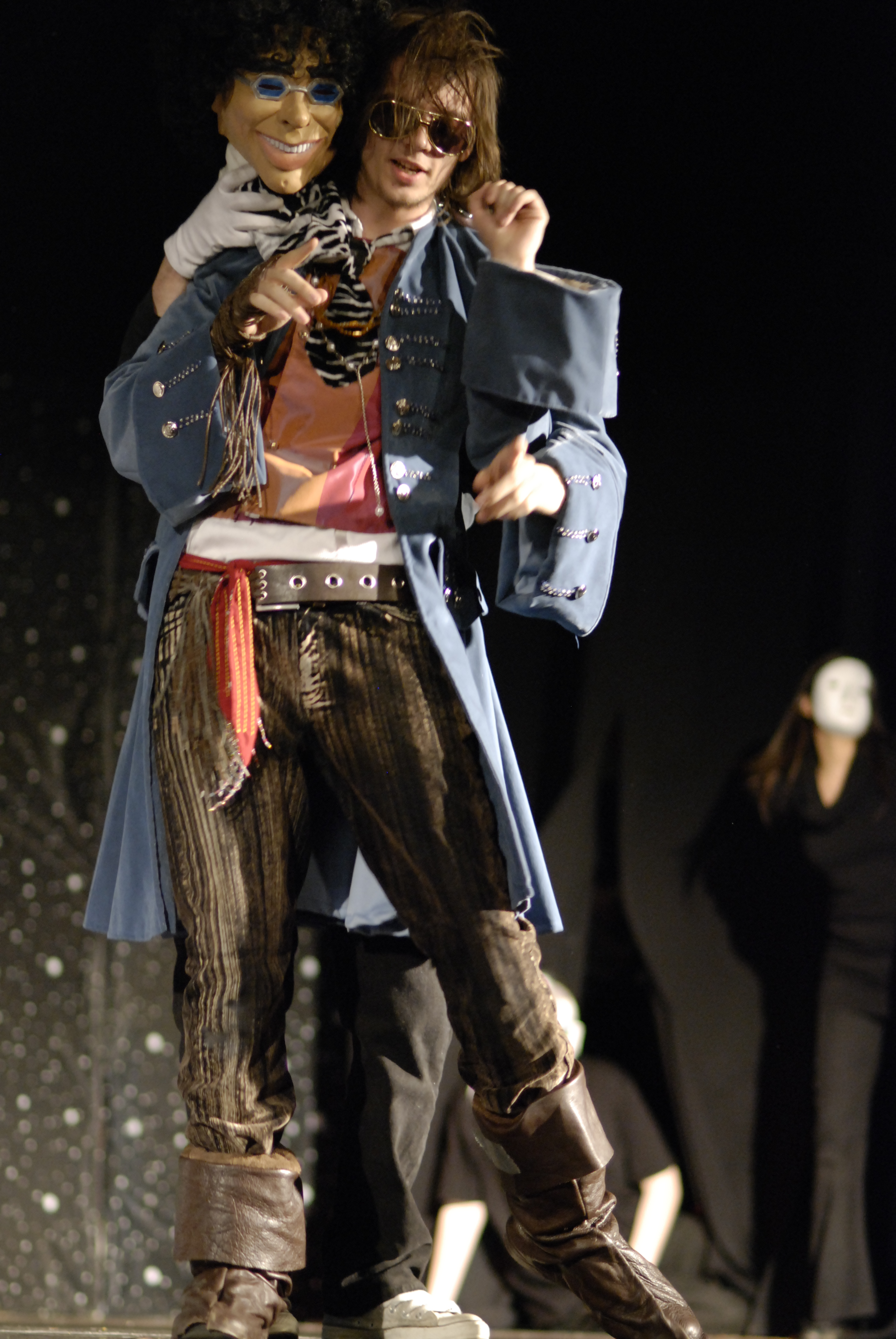
An actor portraying Zaphod in an amateur production of HHGTTG by Prudhoe's Really Youthful Theatre Company

In both the radio and television versions of The Hitchhiker's Guide to the Galaxy Zaphod was played by Mark Wing-Davey. The jokes about Zaphod having two heads and more than two arms were written for the original radio version, where the details could be filled in by the listener's imagination. In the television version Wing-Davey wore a false arm (when the arm was required to gesture it was replaced by the arm of Mike Kelt, designer of the animatronic head, standing behind Wing-Davey), and a radio-controlled second head with an eye-patch. Unfortunately, the second head's mechanics seldom worked properly and so for most of the time it just sat on Zaphod's shoulder looking inanimate, although in one scene it manages to have a brief conversation with Wing-Davey's real head, before being told to "go back to sleep". Wing-Davey also suggested to the TV series' costume designer that Zaphod's costume should be made to indicate that the character has two penises. Special padding was thus arranged, though the first attempt was deemed to be "too long" and was "cut back" for the final version. This was referenced in the film version when Arthur Dent says to Trillian "So, two heads is what does it for a girl?...Anything else he's got two of?"

Zaphod is played by Sam Rockwell in the film version of the story that was released in April 2005. In that version, his second head occasionally pops out to express the parts of his personality that are (as the main head puts it) "less than Presidential." Rockwell performed Zaphod as a blend of Vince Vaughn and Elvis taking additional influence from George W. Bush and Bill Clinton among others.

The Illustrated Hitchhiker's Guide to the Galaxy has him portrayed by Francis Johnson.

When Mark Wing-Davey's academic commitments prevented him resuming the role of Zaphod for the 2013 tour of "The Hitchhiker's Guide to the Galaxy Live Radio Show", comedian, songwriter and author Mitch Benn was cast in the part.

To coincide with the April 2005 release of The Hitchhiker's Guide to the Galaxy film, a "campaign music video" was released on the Internet. The music, "Vote Beeblebrox" by Joby Talbot, comes from the film's soundtrack, though it is not heard in the film itself.

== Pan-Galactic Gargle Blaster ==
Zaphod is the inventor of the Pan-Galactic Gargle Blaster, a fictional cocktail based on Janx Spirit. The series describes the drink as "the alcoholic equivalent of a mugging – expensive and bad for the head" and states that the effect of one "is like having your brain smashed out by a slice of lemon wrapped round a large gold brick". In the television series, two Gargle Blaster drinkers collapse in open-eyed unconsciousness after drinking while the spilled drink burns a hole in the floor; in the film, after the Guide is done explaining what the Pan-Galactic Gargle Blaster is and its effects, Ford and Zaphod yell in pain. The Hitchhiker's Guide to the Galaxy gives the recipe as follows:

"Take the juice from one bottle of that Ol' Janx Spirit.
Pour into it one measure of water from the seas of Santraginus V
Allow three cubes of Arcturan Mega-gin to melt into the mixture (it must be properly iced or the benzene is lost).
Allow four litres of Fallian marsh gas to bubble through it (in memory of all those happy Hikers who have died of pleasure in the Marshes of Fallia).
Over the back of a silver spoon float a measure of Qualactin Hypermint extract, redolent of all the heady odours of the dark Qualactin Zones.
Drop in the tooth of an Algolian Suntiger. Watch it dissolve, spreading the fires of the Algolian suns deep into the heart of the drink.
Sprinkle Zamphuor.
Add an olive.
Drink...but very carefully."

The Guide also implies that there are multiple voluntary organisations available to rehabilitate those who would try the Pan-Galactic Gargle Blaster. Real versions of the drink have been made available at some stage shows of The Hitchhiker's Guide to the Galaxy, as well as bars such as Zaphod Beeblebrox in Ottawa, Ontario, Canada. In an interview, Douglas Adams stated that there are a number of environmental and weapons treaties, as well as laws of physics, which prevent the Pan Galactic Gargle Blaster from being mixed on Earth.

== Cultural references ==
There are many references to the character in video games and other media, some of the more notable examples are:

The head male meerkat on the Animal Planet television series Meerkat Manor was named after him.

In the Mac game Escape Velocity, there is a planet called Beeblebrox in the Zaphod system. Upon landing, the planet has the description "Beeblebrox is a wild world, a world of wild parties and wild people. If you have two heads, three arms, and an ego problem, don't travel to Beeblebrox; you will be laughed at and considered boring and unoriginal."

A nightclub named Zaphod Beeblebrox existed in Ottawa, Ontario, Canada, billed as "the nightclub at the edge of the universe." Opened in the early 1990s, it hosted an assortment of artists including Jewel, The Sheepdogs and Alanis Morissette, who previewed Jagged Little Pill with a concert there. The Rolling Stones shot part of their video for the song "Streets of Love" in the club in 2005. The venue closed on 14 May 2017.

Species named after Zaphod are the viviparous brotula Bidenichthys beeblebroxi (described in 1995) and the fungus moth Erechthias beeblebroxi (named in 1993). They both have a remarkable color pattern resembling a second head, which presumably helps to confuse would-be predators.

Mathematician Andrew Granville published a paper titled "Zaphod Beeblebrox's Brain and the Fifty-ninth Row of Pascal's Triangle" in The American Mathematical Monthly, Vol. 99, (1992), pp. 318–331.

In 2016, during season 4 of Teenage Mutant Ninja Turtles, the group travels to a Cantina in outer space belonging to someone named Zaphod.

Sun Microsystems manuals published in the 1980s named the computers in their network diagrams Zaphod, Beeble and Brox.

== See also ==
- List of The Hitchhiker's Guide to the Galaxy characters
- Young Zaphod Plays it Safe
