= Works by Douglas Adams =

Douglas Adams bibliography
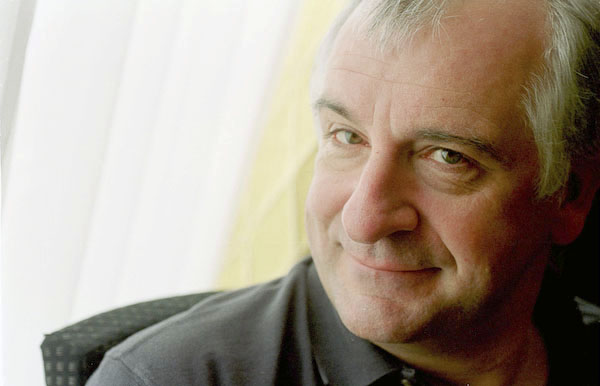
- Douglas Adams, c. late 1990s
- Novels↙: 7
- Stories↙: 3
- Plays↙: 6
- Non-fiction books↙: 4
- Video games↙: 3

Douglas Adams (1952–2001) was an English humorist and writer who worked in radio, television, theatre, literature, and video games. His 1978 radio series The Hitchhiker's Guide to the Galaxy, which he adapted for multiple mediums, was one of the first mainstream science fiction comedy works in Western media, and built him a prominent cult following.

In 1972, Adams became a member of the Cambridge student comedy club Footlights. He wrote numerous comedy sketches for Footlights revues, notably as "Adams-Smith-Adams" with co-writers Will Adams (no relation) and Martin Smith. He formed a brief writing partnership with Graham Chapman, with whom he contributed to a 1974 episode of Monty Python's Flying Circus and co-wrote the television pilot Out of the Trees (1976). However, Adams subsequently faced difficulty securing work due to his unconventional style of comedy. His first professional solo work was for the radio comedy series The Burkiss Way in 1977.

Adams' profile rose in 1978 when his pitch for The Hitchhiker's Guide to the Galaxy was accepted and produced by BBC Radio 4. Adams wrote four of the series' six episodes, and co-wrote the last two episodes with John Lloyd. The show became a hit with audiences in the United Kingdom and Adams also adapted the series into a best-selling 1979 novel. He was script editor on Doctor Who from 1978 to 1979, and he also contributed to the serials The Pirate Planet (1978), City of Death (1979), and Shada; production on the latter was never completed, though reconstructions were released in 1992 and 2017.

The second Hitchhiker's radio series began broadcast in January 1980, and Adams adapted elements from both radio series into a second novel, The Restaurant at the End of the Universe (1980). He also adapted Hitchhiker's into a 1981 television series and a 1984 video game. Adams' third Hitchhiker's novel, Life, the Universe and Everything (1982), was his first not to be adapted from the radio series; instead it was based on an unproduced Doctor Who treatment. The novel was followed by another, So Long, and Thanks for All the Fish, in 1984. In 1987, Adams designed the video game Bureaucracy, and he also began a new novel series about detective Dirk Gently in Dirk Gently's Holistic Detective Agency (1987) and its sequel The Long Dark Tea-Time of the Soul (1988). Around this time, Adams and Lloyd also co-wrote the comedy dictionary The Meaning of Liff (1983) and its follow-up The Deeper Meaning of Liff (1990).

Adams produced fewer books in the 1990s, turning his attention instead to digital and environmental efforts. He wrote and presented the "fantasy documentary" Hyperland (1990) and he and Mark Carwardine chronicled their travels in the non-fiction book Last Chance to See (1990). Adam's fifth Hitchhiker's novel, Mostly Harmless, was published in 1992. In 1995, Adams and Robbie Stamp founded the digital media company The Digital Village, through which Adams developed the 1998 video game Starship Titanic and in 1999 founded the open source online comedic encyclopaedia h2g2. Adams also spent decades developing a feature film adaptation of The Hitchhiker's Guide to the Galaxy, which was released posthumously in 2005.

Adams died in 2001. He was writing a third Dirk Gently novel at the time; ten chapters of this novel, alongside Adams' essays, speeches and short stories, were posthumously published in The Salmon of Doubt (2002).

Adams did not consider himself a science fiction writer but rather a comedy writer who worked in the genre of science fiction. He also thought of himself more as a screenwriter than a novelist. His writing is characterised by deadpan humour, wordplay and witty one-liners, often satirising bureaucracy, modern technology, and humanity's belief in its own importance.

== Literature ==
Year	Title	Type	First edition publisher	Notes	Ref.
1979	The Hitchhiker's Guide to the Galaxy	Novel	Pan Books	Adapted from the first four episodes of the first series of the radio programme	
1980	The Restaurant at the End of the Universe	Novel	Pan Books	Adapted from the first and second series of the radio programme	
1980	A Liar's Autobiography: Volume VI	Spoof memoir	Eyre Methuen Ltd	Graham Chapman's autobiography; Co-written with Chapman, David Sherlock, Alex Martin and David Yallop	
1980	Not! the Nine O'Clock News	Spoof magazine	BBC	Received a writing credit (amongst various writers) for various gags created in Footlights	
1981	Not 1982	Spoof magazine	Faber & Faber	Received a writing credit (amongst various writers) for various gags created in Footlights	
1982	Not 1983	Spoof magazine	Faber & Faber	Received a writing credit (amongst various writers) for various gags created in Footlights	
1982	Life, the Universe and Everything	Novel	Pan Books	Based on Adams' unproduced Doctor Who script The Krikkitmen	
1983	The Meaning of Liff	Spoof dictionary	Pan Books, in association with Faber & Faber	Co-written with John Lloyd	
1984	So Long, and Thanks for All the Fish	Novel	Pan Books		
1985	The Hitchhiker's Guide to the Galaxy: The Original Radio Scripts	Radio script	Pan Books	Contains the scripts for the first two radio series	
1986	"The Private Life of Genghis Khan"	Short story	Fontana Press	Based on an Out of the Trees sketch by Adams and Graham Chapman	
1986	"A Christmas Fairly Story"	Short story	Fontana Press	Co-written with Terry Jones	
1986	"Young Zaphod Plays It Safe"	Short story	Fontana Press	Revised by Adams for The Wizards of Odd (1996)	
1986	"The Official Supplement to the Meaning of Liff"	Spoof dictionary	Fontana Press	Co-written with John Lloyd and Stephen Fry; published in The Utterly Utterly Merry Comic Relief Christmas Book	
1987	Dirk Gently's Holistic Detective Agency	Novel	William Heinemann Ltd		
1988	The Long Dark Tea-Time of the Soul	Novel	William Heinemann Ltd		
1990	Last Chance to See	Non-fiction	William Heinemann Ltd	Co-written with Mark Carwardine; companion book to the radio series of the same name. Also published on CD-ROM	
1990	The Deeper Meaning of Liff	Spoof dictionary	Faber & Faber	Co-written with John Lloyd	
1992	Mostly Harmless	Novel	William Heinemann Ltd		
2002	The Salmon of Doubt (Note: Released posthumously)	Collection	Macmillan Publishers	Ten chapters of unfinished Dirk Gently novel; includes short stories, essays, and interviews by Adams	
2023	42: The Wildly Improbable Ideas of Douglas Adams	Collection	Unbound	Collection of Adams' notes and essays; edited by Kevin Jon Davies	

== Radio and soundtrack ==
Year	Title	Broadcaster or Publisher	Notes	Ref.
1975	The Album of the Soundtrack of the Trailer of the Film of Monty Python and the Holy Grail	Charisma	Contributed to the sketch "Marilyn Monroe"	
1977	The News Huddlines	BBC Radio 2	Contributed to episode eleven	
1977	The Burkiss Way	BBC Radio 4	Contributed to the first and sixth episodes of the second series	
1978	The Hitchhiker's Guide to the Galaxy (retroactively subtitled The Primary Phase)	BBC Radio 4	Six episodes; "Fit the Fifth" and "Fit the Sixth" were co-written with John Lloyd.	
1978	Not Now, I'm Listening	BBC Radio 4	Contributed one sketch; broadcast 21 May 1978	
1978	The News Quiz	BBC Radio 4	Devised questions for 26 August and 2 September 1978 editions	
1978–1980	The Hitchhiker's Guide to the Galaxy (retroactively subtitled The Secondary Phase)	BBC Radio 4	Christmas special broadcast in 1978, further five episodes broadcast from January 1980.	
1979	The Hitchhiker's Guide to the Galaxy	Original Records	Re-recording of the first four episodes of the radio series for LP release	
1980	The Restaurant at the End of the Universe	Original Records	Expanded re-recording of "Fit the Fifth" and "Fit the Sixth" (originally co-written with John Lloyd) for LP release	
1981	An Evening Without...	Original Records	Used existing Adams-Smith-Adams (Note: A writing trio consisting of Douglas Adams, Martin Smith and Will Adams (no relation), formed at Cambridge) material	
1999	The Internet: The Last Battleground of the 20th century	BBC Radio 4	Documentary series	
2000	The Hitchhiker's Guide to the Future	BBC Radio 4	Documentary series	

== Television ==
Year	Programme	Episode/Serial	Broadcaster	Notes	Ref.
1974	Chox	—N/a	BBC2	Televised version of Footlights' 1974 May Week Revue; Adams-Smith-Adams contributed significant material	
1974	Monty Python's Flying Circus	"Party Political Broadcast"	BBC2	The sketch "Patient Abuse"; co-written with Graham Chapman	
1976	Out of the Trees	—N/a	BBC2	Co-written with Graham Chapman and Bernard McKenna	
1977	Doctor on the Go	"For Your Own Good"	ITV	Co-written with Graham Chapman	
1978	Doctor Who	The Pirate Planet	BBC1	Four episodes	
1979	Doctor Who	Destiny of the Daleks	BBC1	Four episodes; uncredited rewrites on Terry Nation's script	
1979	Doctor Who	City of Death	BBC1	Four episodes; co-written with Graham Williams, from an original storyline by David Fisher, and credited to David Agnew	
1979	Doctor Snuggles	"The Great Disappearing Mystery"	ITV	Co-written with John Lloyd	
1979	Doctor Snuggles	"The Remarkable Fidgety River"	ITV	Co-written with John Lloyd	
1979–1980	Doctor Who	Shada	—N/a	Six episodes; filming was not originally completed due to industrial action at the BBC. Released on VHS in 1992	
1981	The Hitchhiker's Guide to the Galaxy	"Fit the First"	BBC2	Six episodes; adapted from the first radio series	
1981	The Hitchhiker's Guide to the Galaxy	"Fit the Second"	BBC2	Six episodes; adapted from the first radio series	
1981	The Hitchhiker's Guide to the Galaxy	"Fit the Third"	BBC2	Six episodes; adapted from the first radio series	
1981	The Hitchhiker's Guide to the Galaxy	"Fit the Fourth"	BBC2	Six episodes; adapted from the first radio series	
1981	The Hitchhiker's Guide to the Galaxy	"Fit the Fifth"	BBC2	Six episodes; adapted from the first radio series	
1981	The Hitchhiker's Guide to the Galaxy	"Fit the Sixth"	BBC2	Six episodes; adapted from the first radio series	
1983	Doctor Who	"The Five Doctors"	BBC1	Uses scenes from Shada; Adams was not credited	
1990	Hyperland	—N/a	BBC2	Documentary	
1992	The South Bank Show	"Douglas Adams"	ITV	Documentary series	

== Film ==
Year	Title	Distributor	Notes	Ref.
2005	The Hitchhiker's Guide to the Galaxy	Buena Vista Pictures Distribution	Co-written with Karey Kirkpatrick	

== Theatre ==
Year	Title	Debut venue	Notes	Ref.
1973	Several Poor Players Strutting and Fretting	School of Pythagoras	Adams-Smith-Adams; additional material by John Parry, Jon Canter, Jeremy Browne and John Cleese	
1973	The Patter of Tiny Minds	School of Pythagoras	Revue written by Adams-Smith-Adams; additional material by John Lloyd	
1974	Cerberus: The Amazing Three-Headed Revue	ADC Theatre	Revue written by Adams-Smith-Adams	
1975	So You Think You Feel Haddocky	Little Theatre, London	Revue written by Adams-Smith-Adams and Gail Renard	
1976	The Unpleasantness at Brodie's Close	Edinburgh Festival Fringe	Co-written with David Renwick, Andrew Marshall, John Lloyd and John Mason; loosely based on The Unpleasantness at the Bellona Club by Dorothy L. Sayers	
1980	The Hitchhiker's Guide to the Galaxy	Rainbow Theatre	Produced by Ken Campbell and presented by his Science Fiction Theatre of Liverpool; Adams wrote additional material (the "Dish of the Day" scene) for this staging	

=== Contributor ===
Year	Title	Debut venue	Notes	Ref.
1972	LSO in Flames		Adams and Keith Jeffrey co-wrote "Trees Afoot"; Adams wrote "Post Offices Prefer Bombs" and "The Serious Sketch"	
1973	I Don't Know – I've Never Looked		Footlights "smoker"; Adams contributed "A Song for Stupid People"	
1973	A Burst of Apalsy		Adams contributed "Point Taken (aka Pritchard)"	
1973	Duplicator's Revenge		Adams-Smith-Adams	
1973	Nostalgia's Not What It Was		Three sketches by Adams-Smith-Adams	
1973	Cambridge Footlights Revue	Bishop's Stortford	Various sketches	
1974	Litter from America		Footlights "smoker"; four sketches by Adams-Smith-Adams	
1974	Late Night Final		Six items by Adams-Smith-Adams	
1974	In Spite of It All			
1974	A Room with a Revue	Belgrade Theatre	Adams-Smith-Adams	
1974	Chox	ADC Theatre	Footlights' 1974 May Week Revue; Adams-Smith-Adams contributed significant material	
1975	Paradise Mislaid		Footlights' 1975 May Week Revue; Used existing Adams-Smith-Adams material	
1976	All's Well That Ends		Footlights' 1976 Late Night Revue; Used existing Adams-Smith-Adams material	

== Digital projects ==
Year	Title	Developer	Notes	Ref.
1984	The Hitchhiker's Guide to the Galaxy	Infocom	Video game; co-created with Steve Meretzky	
1987	Bureaucracy	Infocom	Video game	
1998	Starship Titanic	The Digital Village	Video game; co-written with Michael Bywater and Neil Richards. Additional dialogue written by Debbie Barham.	
1999	h2g2	The Digital Village	Open source online comedic encyclopaedia	
