= Timeline of The Hitchhiker's Guide to the Galaxy versions =

This timeline shows the dates (and order of release) of all of the various media relating to Douglas Adams' The Hitchhiker's Guide to the Galaxy series. Where multiple releases/broadcasts occurred, the first one is given.

Date	Medium	Title
March 8 – April 12, 1978	Radio series	Primary Phase: "Fit the First" to "Fit the Sixth"
December 24, 1978	Radio series	Christmas Special, which became Secondary Phase: "Fit the Seventh"
May 1–9, 1979	Stage show	The Hitchhiker's Guide to the Galaxy (ICA)
1979	Record	The Hitchhiker's Guide to the Galaxy
October 1979	Novel	The Hitchhiker's Guide to the Galaxy
January 21–25, 1980	Radio series	Secondary Phase: "Fit the Eighth" to "Fit the Twelfth"
January 15 – February 23, 1980	Stage show	The Hitchhiker's Guide to the Galaxy (Theatr Clwyd)
1980	Record	The Hitchhiker's Guide to the Galaxy Part Two: The Restaurant at the End of the Universe
October, 1980	Novel	The Restaurant at the End of the Universe
July 13 – August 2 1980	Stage show	The Hitchhiker's Guide to the Galaxy (Rainbow)
January 5 – February 9, 1981	TV series	The Hitchhiker's Guide to the Galaxy
1982	Novel	Life, the Universe and Everything
October 1984	Computer game	The Hitchhiker's Guide to the Galaxy
November 1984	Novel	So Long, and Thanks for All the Fish
1985	Radio scripts	The Hitchhiker's Guide to the Galaxy: The Original Radio Scripts
1986	Short story	"Young Zaphod Plays It Safe"
1992	Novel	Mostly Harmless
May 11, 2001		Death of Douglas Adams
September 21 – October 26, 2004	Radio series	Tertiary Phase: "Fit the Thirteenth" to "Fit the Eighteenth"
April 28, 2005	Film	The Hitchhiker's Guide to the Galaxy
May 3–24, 2005	Radio series	Quandary Phase: "Fit the Nineteenth" to "Fit the Twenty-Second"
May 31 – June 21, 2005	Radio series	Quintessential Phase: "Fit the Twenty-Third" to "Fit the Twenty-Sixth"
March 12, 2008	Stage show	Live reading of Fit the Second (by the original cast) at the 6th Douglas Adams Memorial Lecture.
October 11, 2009	Stage show	Hitchhikers Live On Stage! at Hitchcon event for publication of sixth book (below).
October 12, 2009	Novel	And Another Thing..., by Eoin Colfer
June 8 – July 21, 2012	Stage show	The Hitchhiker's Guide to the Galaxy Radio Show Live
September 14 – October 20, 2013	Stage show	The Hitchhiker's Guide to the Galaxy Radio Show Live (Planned to run to November 30, the show closed early.)
March 29, 2014	Radio show	The Hitchhiker's Guide to the Galaxy, a live radio broadcast in front of an audience as part of Radio 4's Character Invasion Day
March 8 – April 12, 2018	Radio series	Hexagonal Phase: "Fit the Twenty-Seventh" to "Fit the Thirty-Second"
November 15 2025 – February 15 2026	Stage show	The Hitchhiker's Guide to the Galaxy Live Immersive Show (Riverside)
