= Douglas Adams at the BBC =

Douglas Adams at the BBC is a three CD set released by BBC Audio in 2004 (ISBN 0-563-49404-2). By using extracts from many radio and TV productions, the three discs cover Douglas Adams's association with BBC Radio and TV from 1974 to 2001, and also include tributes to Adams that were transmitted between 2001 and 2003. Subjects are covered in an A-Z format (thus becoming an "A-Z of Douglas Adams"). Linking narration on all three discs is provided by Simon Jones. Several of the sketches, many of which are included for the first time since their original transmissions, had been discussed in biographies of Adams (e.g. Don't Panic by Neil Gaiman and Wish You Were Here by Nick Webb). In addition, the complete script for "The Lost Hitchhiker Sketch" appears in the 25th anniversary edition of The Hitchhiker's Guide to the Galaxy: The Original Radio Scripts. Disc one covers subjects A to G, disc two covers subjects H to P, and disc three covers subjects Q to Z.

== Subjects ==
- A: Animals: The aye-aye lemur and the Amazonian manatee, with excerpts from the radio series version of Last Chance to See
- B: The Burkiss Way, including sketches by Adams
- C: Computer Games (including the 1985 computer game adaptation of The Hitchhiker's Guide to the Galaxy and Starship Titanic)
- D: Dirk Gently
- E: Endangered Species
- F: Footlights Revue
- G: Graham Chapman
- H: The Hitchhiker's Guide to the Future, Adams's final radio documentary series for BBC Radio 4
- I: The Internet
- J: "Keeping up with the Joneses" - an extract from Adams's radio tribute to Peter Jones in 2000.
- K: The Kakapo Parrot
- L: "The Lost Hitchhiker Sketch" - Sheila Steafel interviewing Simon Jones, in character as Arthur Dent from the radio show Steafel Plus, written by Adams.
- L (continued): Light Entertainment, including an extract from Black Cinderella Two Goes East
- M: Music and The Meaning of Liff
- N: News Huddlines
- O: Oh No, It Isn't - with a sketch from this 1970s radio series written by Adams.
- P: Publishing and Performing
- Q: Quiz Shows
- R: The Rodrigues Fruit Bat
- S: Science
- T: Technology
- U: The Universe
- V: Virtual Reality
- W: Doctor Who with extracts from The Pirate Planet
- X: Extra-Terrestrial Life
- Y: The Yangtze River Dolphin
- Z: Zoology

Note: The CD set was released in early September 2004, after the Tertiary Phase of The Hitchhiker's Guide to the Galaxy had been recorded, but before transmissions began. The earliest material on the set is from August 1974 (with material Adams had written while a student at Cambridge) and the most recent extracts are from the TV and radio tributes to Adams from August and September 2001 and March 2003.
