= King Edward VII School, Melton Mowbray =

King Edward VII School

Location
- Burton Road; Melton Mowbray, Leicestershire, LE13 1DR; England; 52°45′14″N 0°52′33″W

Information
- Type: Comprehensive
- Established: 1910
- Closed: 2011
- Local authority: Leicestershire
- Specialist: Technology College
- Department for Education URN: 120238 Tables
- Ofsted: Reports
- Staff: 120
- Gender: Coeducational
- Age: 11 to 18
- Enrolment: 2104

King Edward VII School (KE7) was an LEA maintained 11-19 comprehensive secondary school in Melton Mowbray, Leicestershire in England which closed in 2011. The school was situated on a 56-acre (230,000 m^{2}) green field site on the edge of Melton Mowbray. Formerly, the school was a public grammar school. A third phase specialist technology college, Microsoft Partner School, CISCO Academy and training college, the school received a range of awards for its work.

The school was one of the first in the country to offer Diploma in Digital Applications (DiDA) as a course, being one of the pilot schools for the qualification.

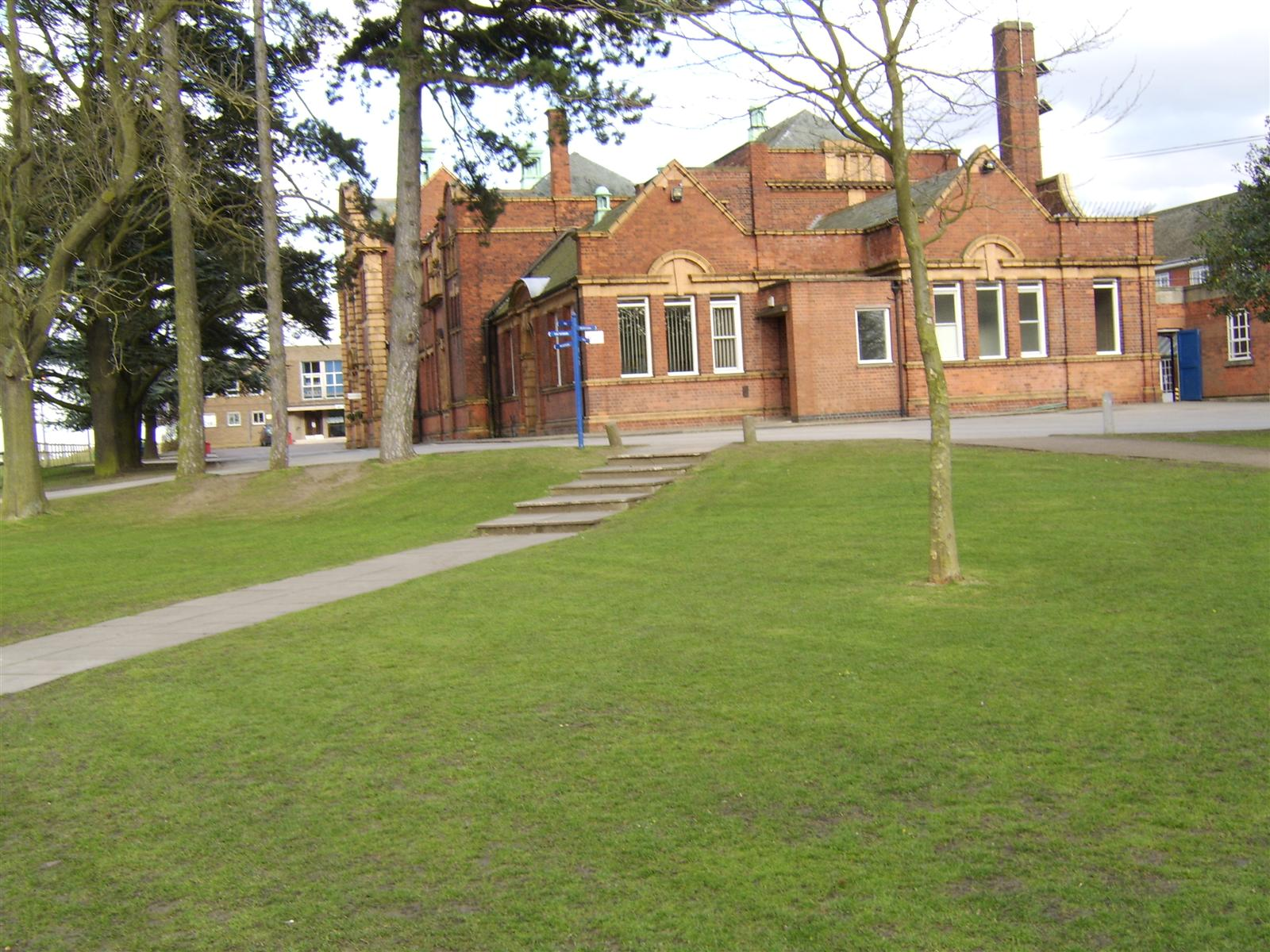
King Edward VII School, Melton Mowbray

== Location ==
King Edward VII School was located on Burton Road within the town. Because the campus was originally two separate schools (the grammar school and Sarson high school), there are two main entrances to the school. The south entrance now gives access to the Melton Rugby Club and King Edward VII Sports centre located on campus, following the demolition of the Sarson High School buildings. King Edward VII was established in 1910 and some of its original buildings still remain. Around the original core, however, a range of modern blocks have developed. The site now also incorporates a special school, which opened in September 2004.

== History ==
In June 1909 the first head-teacher, Dr Fred Hodson was appointed; 93 applications had been received for the position. The School was christened the County Grammar School of King Edward VII. The school's royal authorisation to use the name was challenged, but before proof could be obtained the King died. It took an intervention from MPs before the Board of Education finally confirmed the new King had agreed the use of his father's name. On 13 April 1910 Thomas Cope, Chairman of Leicestershire County Council and, of the Education Committee, was presented with a key to the school by its architect, Mr Shelbourn. Mr Cope was something of a key collector due to all the new schools at the time. The first sports day took place on 20 June 1912. School houses were introduced earlier that year: Belvoir – red, Cottesmore – yellow, and Quorn – blue. Popular events included pillow fights, needle-threading, skipping races and bean bag races. In 1914 the first Old Pupils' Association was started with Bob Spikes, the school's first head boy as secretary. In 1931 plans for large extensions and rebuilding were discussed. In 1936 the building of the new assembly hall began, while the old domestic science block was replaced with a two storey block, which were finally opened on 25 November 1937. In the 1940s the Old Grammarians' started a memorial fund to build a pavilion for the school in memory of those who had died during the two world wars; it was opened on 24 July 1954. During 1958 two new buildings were built to the east of the original school. One of which was shared with the Boys Modern School. The Leicestershire Plan in 1959, the brainchild of Mr S C Mason, Director of Education at Leicestershire County Council, brought about a radical change in secondary schools in the Melton area. During this period, in 1964 the County Grammar School was renamed King Edward VII Upper School. Under the plan the Boys' Modern School and the Sarson Girls' School were phased out and replaced by three co-educational feeder schools, including the new Ferneley High School. The School campus continued to grow: in 1975 a new six form block was opened, and a new sports hall was built. The all-weather pitch and the music centre were opened in 1991, followed by the Community Sports Centre in February 1996. In June 1997 King Edward VII School gained Technology College Status. This set to work the major project of creating an Independent Learning Centre (Iliad) and improving the design facilities. The Iliad centre was opened in January 1998. On Tuesday 9 March 2010 the County Council Cabinet agreed to the proposal to close King Edward VII School in September 2011, as they predicted falling pupil numbers would make it unsustainable.

== ICT facilities ==
The school used networked hubs in each subject area, video conferencing facilities, and extensive wireless networking for laptops. Over summer 2004 the school had completely replaced its ICT infrastructure and had over 500 computers, providing a computer ratio of 1:4 for students and laptops for all teaching staff. The school gained recognition from Microsoft for its innovative use of their technologies, particularly SharePoint. It was named one of just three Microsoft partner schools in the country. The IT team during this period up until the school’s eventual closure was led by Andy Dent, Jim Mackintosh then David Grimes. The latter moved across to lead the IT team at the newly built Melton Vale Post 16 Centre instead.

== Awards ==
CISCO Award for Innovative use of ICT and British Council International School Award in 2003. The school was an Enterprise Pathfinder. Designated as a Training School in 2004. The school was an Investor in People. Regional Training Award 2003. SSAT Research and Development hub. Sportsmark and Artsmark accreditation.

== Notable alumni ==
- Paul Anderson, Nottingham Forest F.C. footballer
- Graham Chapman, head boy, actor and founder member of Monty Python
- Terri Dwyer, actress
- Tony Fairbrother, flight test engineer on the maiden flight of the de Havilland Comet
- Robert Harris, writer
- John Henley, preacher
- Sean Lamont, and brother Rory Lamont, Scottish international rugby players
- Martin Lister, naturalist
- Dave Benson Phillips, comedian and television presenter
- Clive Standen, actor
- Adrian Scarborough, actor
