= The Hitchhiker's Guide to the Future =

BBC Radio Series First Broadcast In 2000

The Hitchhiker's Guide to the Future was a four-part radio series hosted by Douglas Adams. It was first broadcast on BBC Radio 4 in October 2000, and repeated in April and May 2001, and September 2014. Because the radio series turned out to be Adams's final project for the BBC before his death (a week after the first broadcast of the final episode), all four episodes are still available for download from the Radio 4 website. Extracts from the four programmes are also available for listening within the Douglas Adams at the BBC collection.

== The Episodes ==
- Programme One: Music

Original Transmission: 11:00 am, Wednesday 4 October 2000, BBC Radio 4

Adams discusses the future of music in the "Internet Age" (which at the time was mainly limited to discussion of illegal download services, such as the first version of Napster - it would be another two years before the iTunes Music Store opened to the American market, and legal music downloads would start to become popular). Topics include digital music creation and online distribution. Adams interviews Brian Eno, Michael Nesmith and Peter Gabriel.

- Programme Two: Publishing

Original Transmission: 11:00 am, Wednesday 11 October 2000, BBC Radio 4

Adams discusses the future of publishing with Peter Cochrane, Muriel Gray and Stewart Brand. Topics include the online distribution of e-books and e-book readers.

- Programme Three: Broadcasting

Original Transmission: 11:00 am, Wednesday 18 October 2000, BBC Radio 4

Adams discusses the future of TV with John Browning, Dylan Winter and Mathew Steele. Topics included the possibilities of interactive programming, digital video creation and custom scheduling.

- Programme Four: Convergence

Original Transmission: 11:00 am, Wednesday 25 October 2000, BBC Radio 4

Adams discusses the future evolution of technology and Artificial Intelligence with Chris Langton, Stuart Kauffman, and others. Topics included embedded and nano- technologies.

On Saturday 14 March 2015, Mitch Benn presented a programme called Did Douglas Get It Right? which reviewed how accurate the predications from the year 2000 were.

== See also ==
- The Hitchhiker's Guide to the Galaxy
