= Jake's Journey =

Jake's Journey was a television pilot created, co-written and starring Monty Python member Graham Chapman in 1988. It was one of the last projects for Chapman and the last for director Hal Ashby.

The script is included in the book Ojril: The Complete Incomplete Graham Chapman. ISBN 9781574882704

== Plot ==
A teenage boy time travels back to the Middle Ages. He meets George, a knight and they embark on a quest together.

== Cast ==
- Chris Young - Jake
- Graham Chapman - Sir George/Queen/Taxi Driver
- Peter Cook - King
- Nancy Lenehan - Jake's Mother
- Lane Smith - Jake's Father
- Gabrielle Anwar -Princess/Fiona Penwarden
- Rik Mayall - Troll
- Alexei Sayle - Head Torturer
- Liz Smith - Witch
- Griff Rhys Jones - Innkeeper
- Richard Strange - Lobster 1
- Tony Slattery - Lobster 2
- Susie Blake - Torturer's Wife
- Celia Imrie - Torturer's Wife's Friend
- Daniel Peacock - British Telecom Engineer
