= The Private Life of Genghis Khan =

Story by Douglas Adams and Graham Chapman

"The Private Life of Genghis Khan" is a short story written by Douglas Adams and Graham Chapman. It is based in part on a sketch devised by Graham Chapman, and written by Chapman and Adams for the 1975 TV show pilot Out of the Trees. It appears in The Utterly Utterly Merry Comic Relief Christmas Book and some versions of The Salmon of Doubt. It is also available on Douglas Adams' website.

Wowbagger, the Infinitely Prolonged (a recurring character from some of Adams' novels) makes a brief appearance in the story.

== Plot summary ==
The short story presents a humorous account of Genghis Khan's day. The first section is an encounter with a woman in her home, where a soldier instructs the woman to ask the Khan questions about his day with affection, to which she replies in an apathetic manner. The soldier, while repeatedly thrashing and threatening the woman, demands that she continue to ask the Khan questions about his day in an affectionate manner like a stereotypical wife. The Khan takes out some scrolls and begins to read them, while the soldier instructs the woman to continue her line of questioning and eventually nag the Khan. The woman, afraid for her life, finally gives up and falls at the Khan's feet offering herself in order for the ordeal to stop, to which the Khan replies "No" and "you'd only laugh — you're just like all the others." The section then ends with the line, "He stormed out of the hut and rode off into the night in such a rage that he almost forgot to burn down the village before he left."

The second section deals with a conversation between the Khan and his son, Ogdai, after the Battle of Samarkand. Ogdai tells the khan of his plans to attack Persia the following morning and proceed further in their campaign. Khan replies in a laid-back manner about his busy schedule for the next week and eventually the month of March. He then complains that he will be too busy in April since he has plans to go to Africa. A troubled Ogdai pleads with his father to conquer the world in May. Khan replies "Well, I don't like to commit myself that far in advance. One feels so tied down if one's life is completely mapped out beforehand. I should be doing more reading, for heaven's sake, when am I going to find the time for that? Anyway —" as the Khan pencils down "May — possible conquest of the world" in his scroll without committing to it. Just then, a dark green figure arrives in the tent and introduces himself as Wowbagger, the Infinitely Prolonged. He first approaches the Khan and asks him to check the spelling of his name on his clipboard. When the Khan agrees that the spelling is correct, he proceeds to insult the khan before taking off in his spaceship. The story ends with, "Later that year Genghis Khan stormed into Europe in such a rage that he almost forgot to burn down Asia before he left."
