= The Utterly Utterly Merry Comic Relief Christmas Book =

1986 Fundraising Book Edited by Douglas Adams and Peter Fincham

- Editor: Douglas Adams; Peter Fincham
- Publication date: 1986
- ISBN: 978-0006371281

The Utterly Utterly Merry Comic Relief Christmas Book was a fundraising book issued on behalf of Comic Relief in 1986. It was edited by Douglas Adams and Peter Fincham and contained contributions from Adams and many of the leading comedy writers and performers of the day.

== Contents ==
The book is of particular interest to fans of Douglas Adams' work as it contains several items written by him which are hard to find or exclusive to the collection. Besides the novella Young Zaphod Plays it Safe and the short story "The Private Life of Genghis Khan", which have since appeared in The Salmon of Doubt, the book also contains Adams' short story "A Christmas Fairly Story" (written in collaboration with Terry Jones) and three supplements to The Meaning of Liff.

Items by other authors include:

- Adrian Mole's Christmas, an addition to Sue Townsend's Adrian Mole series (later included in The True Confessions of Adrian Albert Mole).
- A New Decade of Heroic Failures, an exclusive addition to Stephen Pile's Book of Heroic Failures.
- Tie-ins to popular TV comedies of the day including Yes Minister, The Young Ones and Spitting Image.

== Fundraising ==
The book promised that profits would be distributed "80% to SAVE THE CHILDREN FUND and OXFAM for famine relief and 20% to Charity Projects to support young people faced with the problems of drug abuse, homelessness and disability here in Britain."

== Censorship ==
The book has never been reprinted following its initial print run, as a result of religious censorship.

In line with its Christmas theme the book contained several pieces based on the Christian nativity story, including:

- The Gospel According to a Sheep by Richard Curtis with additions by Douglas Adams. This tells the story of the nativity night from the point of view of a sheep that gets eaten as part of the celebrations, and therefore has a slightly jaundiced view of the whole affair.
- The Young Ones' Nativity Play in which the characters from The Young Ones act out the nativity story in typically irreverent style.
- Jesus' Birthday in which Jesus is portrayed as a grumpy and mischievous child in a modern household.

Nicholas Winterton MP led a campaign to ask W. H. Smith not to stock the book. Christian groups took offence, and attempted to get the book withdrawn. They picketed bookshops and threatened to sue for blasphemy. Eventually they prevented the book from being reprinted by applying pressure on the publisher, Collins. Collins held the rights to print certain versions of the Bible and it was threatened that these would be withdrawn. Douglas Adams complained that, as a result, considerably less money was raised for famine relief.

== Contributors ==
Contributors included Douglas Adams, Rowan Atkinson, Glen Baxter, Michael Bywater, Graham Chapman, Nobby Clarke, Ron Cobb, Richard Curtis, Angus Deayton, Adrian Edmondson, Michael Fishwick, Michael Foreman, Stephen Fry, Kim Fuller, George Harrison, Michael Heath, Lenny Henry, Ian Hislop, Caroline Holden, Richard Ingrams, Antony Jay, Guy Jenkin, Gray Jolliffe, Terry Jones, Trevor Leighton, John Lloyd, Jonathan Lynn, Thomas Mann, Rik Mayall, Lise Mayer, Michael Palin, Geoffrey Perkins, Stephen Pile, Nigel Planer, Christopher Ryan, Griff Rhys Jones, Posy Simmonds, Mel Smith, The Spitting Image Workshop, Sue Townsend, Bill Tidy, and John Wells.
