= A Liar's Autobiography: Volume VI =

1980 autobiography by Graham Chapman

- Front cover
- Author: Graham Chapman
- Illustrator: Johnathan Hills
- Cover artist: Johnathan Hills
- Language: English
- Subject: Autobiography
- Publisher: Eyre Methuen
- Publication date: 16 October 1980
- Publication place: England
- Media type: Print (hardcover)
- Pages: 239
- ISBN: 0-413-47570-0
- OCLC: 256519801
- Dewey Decimal: 828/.91407
- LC Class: PN2598.C27 A35 1980

A Liar's Autobiography: Volume VI is a comical autobiography written by Graham Chapman of Monty Python fame, featuring a fictionalised account of his life. First published in Britain in 1980, it was republished in 1991, 1999 and 2011.

Unusually for an autobiography, the work is credited inside to five authors: Chapman, his partner David Sherlock, Alex Martin, Douglas Adams, and David A. Yallop. Adams' sole contribution was in the form of a sketch written by himself and Chapman for the television pilot Out of the Trees, which was rewritten for the book in the first person and passed off as a real event. It is not known how much material the other writers contributed. The book was re-released in 1991 with an afterword by Eric Idle, which has been included in all subsequent releases.

A semi-sequel, Calcium Made Interesting, was released in 2005.

== Film adaptation ==
In June 2011, it was announced that Bill and Ben Productions was making an animated 3D movie based on the memoir. The full title is A Liar's Autobiography: The Untrue Story of Monty Python's Graham Chapman. Although not a Monty Python movie, all but one of the remaining Pythons are involved in the project. Asked what was true in a deliberately fanciful account by Chapman of his life, Terry Jones joked: "Nothing... it's all a downright, absolute, blackguardly lie."

The film uses Chapman's own voice—from a reading of his autobiography shortly before he died of cancer—and entertainment channel EPIX has announced that the film is in both 2D and 3D formats. Produced and directed by London-based Bill Jones, Ben Timlett and Jeff Simpson, the film used 14 animation companies, each working on chapters that range from 3 to 12 minutes in length, with each chapter in a different style.

John Cleese recorded dialogue which was matched with Chapman's voice. Michael Palin voiced Chapman's father and Terry Jones voiced his mother. Terry Gilliam voiced Graham's psychiatrist. They all play various other roles. Among the original Python group, only Eric Idle was not involved.

The film received a limited theatrical release on 2 November 2012 in the US, and aired on the Epix TV channel on the same day. The film was shown in 3D at the Rotterdam Film Festival on 1 February 2013.
