= Out of the Trees =

1976 British television pilot

- Graham Chapman and Roger Brierley
- Genre: Sketch comedy; Surreal humour; Satire; Black comedy
- Written by: Graham Chapman; Bernard McKenna; Douglas Adams
- Directed by: Ian MacNaughton
- Starring: Graham Chapman; Roger Brierley; Simon Jones; Maria Aitken; Marjie Lawrence; Tim Preece; Mark Wing-Davey; Maggie Henderson; Jennifer Guy
- Theme music composer: Neil Innes
- Country of origin: United Kingdom
- Original language: English
- No. of episodes: 1

Production
- Producer: Bernard Thompson
- Editor: Bob Rymer
- Running time: approx. 32 minutes
- Production company: BBC

Original release
- Network: BBC2
- Release: 10 January 1976

Out of the Trees is a 1976 British television sketch show pilot starring Graham Chapman, Roger Brierley, Simon Jones and Maria Aitken. It was written by Chapman, Bernard McKenna and Douglas Adams and broadcast on BBC2 in 1976. The show shared some of the stream-of-consciousness style of Monty Python's Flying Circus, of which Chapman was a member. The instrumental theme tune was by Neil Innes.

== Premise ==
The concept of the show was, according to Chapman, to follow the exploits of two modern-day linguists who would travel around a Britain gripped in rapid decline. The linguists would comment upon the origins of a word or phrase, which would then be the genesis of a sketch. Although two scripts were written (the second a collaboration between Chapman and David Yallop), only one episode was ever filmed. It was broadcast only once by the BBC, with little promotion, at 10pm on Saturday 10 January 1976 opposite Match of the Day.

== Cast ==
- Graham Chapman
- Roger Brierley
- Simon Jones
- Maria Aitken
- Marjie Lawrence
- Tim Preece
- Mark Wing-Davey
- Maggie Henderson
- Jennifer Guy

== Reception ==
Mark Lewisohn wrote in The Radio Times Guide to TV Comedy: "The general consensus was that Out of the Trees lacked cohesion and no series developed".

== Preservation status ==
The original broadcast standard videotape of the show was subsequently wiped, as often occurred at the time, and the show was then unseen for decades.

The film segments shot in outdoor locations survived, and consist of a sketch titled "Severance of a Peony", and some inserts intended for an item about Genghis Khan. The former was included on the DVD for Adams's 1981 TV series adaptation of The Hitchhiker's Guide to the Galaxy, and also appeared, rewritten as an anecdote, in Chapman's book A Liar's Autobiography. Rewrites of the Genghis Khan sketch appear in some editions of Adams's posthumously published work The Salmon of Doubt as the short story "The Private Life of Genghis Khan".

It was reported in 2005, by a representative posting on the forum at the archive television website The Mausoleum Club, that a videotape made by Chapman on an obsolete format had been given to the National Film Television and Videotape Archive. It was restored, a process which took 2 years and shown at the National Film Theatre on Saturday, 2 December 2006 as part of the Missing Believed Wiped event. It was shown again on 24 September 2019 as part of the BFI commemoration of fifty years of Python.

== Sources ==
- orangecow.org
- sotcaa.org
- news.bbc.co.uk
- bfi.org.uk
