= The Wizards of Odd =

1996 Compilation Book Edited By Peter Haining

First edition (publ. Souvenir Press) Cover art by Josh Kirby

The Wizards of Odd is a 1996 English compilation book of humorous short stories by many great writers in the science-fiction/fantasy genre. The stories were compiled by Peter Haining. The book is separated into three sections: Wizards and Wotsits: Stories of Cosmic Absurdity, Swords and Sorcery: Tales of Heroic Fantasy, and Astronauts and Aliens: Space Opera Yarns.

== Stories ==
=== Wizards and Wotsits ===
- "Theatre of Cruelty" by Terry Pratchett
- "How Nuth Would Have Practised his Art Upon the Gnoles" by Lord Dunsany
- "Hell Hath No Fury" by John Collier
- "The Twonky" by Henry Kuttner
- "A Great Deal of Power" by Eric Frank Russell
- "Doodad" by Ray Bradbury
- "Not By Its Cover" by Philip K. Dick
- "The Rule of Names" by Ursula K. Le Guin

=== Swords and Sorcery ===
- "Mythological Beast" by Stephen R. Donaldson
- "The Adventure of the Snowing Globe" by F. Anstey
- "Affairs in Poictesme" by James Branch Cabell
- "The Ring of Hans Carvel" by Fredric Brown
- "The Bait" by Fritz Leiber
- "A Good Knight's Work" by Robert Bloch
- "Poor Little Warrior" by Brian W. Aldiss
- "The Odd Old Bird" by Avram Davidson

=== Astronauts and Aliens ===
- "Young Zaphod Plays it Safe" by Douglas Adams
- "The Wild Asses of the Devil" by H. G. Wells
- "Ministering Angels" by C. S. Lewis
- "The Gnurrs Come from the Voodvork Out" by Reginald Bretnor
- "Captain Wyxtpthll's Flying Saucer" by Arthur C. Clarke
- "Playboy and the Slime God" by Isaac Asimov
- "There's a Wolf in my Time Machine" by Larry Niven
- "2BR02B" by Kurt Vonnegut, Jr.

== Reception ==
Gideon Kibblewhite reviewed The Wizards of Odd for Arcane magazine, rating it a 9 out of 10 overall. Kibblewhite comments that "It's difficult to award any anthology a perfect ten because some stories are inevitably better than others; The Wizards of Odd, though, comes close: a great nine."

== Reviews ==
- Review by Steven H Silver (1997) in SF Site, Mid-December 1997, (1997)
- Review by Don D'Ammassa (1998) in Science Fiction Chronicle, #195 February 1998
