= The Hitchhiker's Guide to the Galaxy: The Original Radio Scripts =

1985 novel by Douglas Adams

Front cover of the original UK edition of The Original Hitchhiker Radio Scripts, 1985.

Front cover of the US trade paperback edition with the alternate title of The Original Hitchhiker Radio Scripts, 1985.

Front cover of the 25th anniversary UK trade paperback edition of The Hitchhiker's Guide to the Galaxy: The Original Radio Scripts, 2003.

The Hitchhiker's Guide to the Galaxy: The Original Radio Scripts is a book, published in 1985, containing the scripts for the original radio series version of The Hitchhiker's Guide to the Galaxy by Douglas Adams.

== Contents ==
Text present in the original scripts but cut to meet time constraints are printed in italics. This book also includes explanatory footnotes, behind-the-scenes anecdotes, and forewords by Adams and by series producer Geoffrey Perkins.

The book was reprinted in a 10th-year edition in 1995, and a 25th anniversary edition in 2003. The 25th anniversary edition contains a new introduction by Geoffrey Perkins, and newly researched material by M. J. Simpson, including a transcript of The Lost Hitchhiker Sketch. The sketch was an interview with Simon Jones in character as Arthur Dent, conducted by Sheila Steafel on her show Steafel Plus in 1982, written entirely by Adams. The sketch can be heard in the Douglas Adams at the BBC CD collection. The book now contains transcripts of all Hitchhikers radio sketches, barring a sketch for Marvin that Adams wrote for the BBC Radio 1 show Studio B15 to promote the television version of the serial, which was broadcast in 1982.

In the first edition a page of dialogue was omitted from Fit the Twelfth. The 25th-anniversary edition reprint corrects this.

== Reception ==
Dave Langford reviewed The Hitchhiker's Guide to the Galaxy: The Original Radio Scripts for White Dwarf #73, and stated that "This is the perfect cure for fans worried by the differences between radio, radio repeat, record, book, and TV versions."

== Reviews ==
- Review by Paul Brazier (1986) in Vector 130
