= Young Zaphod Plays It Safe =

1986 short story by Douglas Adams

"Young Zaphod Plays It Safe" is a short story by Douglas Adams set in his The Hitchhiker's Guide to the Galaxy universe. It is included with several collections but has never been released as a standalone work. It first appeared in The Utterly Utterly Merry Comic Relief Christmas Book (1986) which Adams also co-edited. A slightly revised version appeared in the 1996 anthology The Wizards of Odd, edited by Peter Haining. The story then appeared (though not always the revised version) in some omnibus editions of The Hitchhiker's Guide to the Galaxy, as well as the Adams retrospective The Salmon of Doubt, and the 2013 anthology The Time Traveler's Almanac.

== Plot ==
The story is a prequel to the events in The Hitchhiker's Guide to the Galaxy and has the young Zaphod Beeblebrox working as a salvage ship operator. He guides some bureaucrats to a crashed and sunken spaceship on an unnamed planet that may be leaking some dangerous materials, radioactive, toxic and otherwise hazardous by-products which were destined to be thrown into a black hole. The bureaucrats swear that it is "perfectly safe." When asked why they want to see it if that is true, they claim that they "like looking at things that are perfectly safe." The ship crashed and sank because its captain had become obsessed with catching and eating lobsters from the planet's oceans. Only one crew member is found alive, having taken shelter in a life-support tank.

Throughout the story, it is emphasised that there is something particularly dangerous on board that ought to have been utterly destroyed, but is feared to have escaped.

Ultimately, it is revealed that the dangerous cargo was actually a trio of identical "Designer People". Their personalities seem totally benign, which is what makes them so dangerous. The ship is filled with substances so hazardous that they are safe because no real person willing to use them would be allowed anywhere near them. However, the Designer People, products of a Sirius Cybernetics Corporation project, have custom-made personalities that cannot naturally exist. There is "nothing they will not do if allowed, and there is nothing they will not be allowed to do." Since no one will recognise that they are capable of causing mass destruction, no one will stop them from doing the unspeakable.

The story culminates with the revelation that one of the Designer People has escaped and is traveling to Galactic Sector ZZ9 Plural Z Alpha, which is where the Earth was located in the original Hitchhiker's Guide to the Galaxy. The bureaucrats issue orders for that sector to be made "perfectly safe."

Since this story takes place before Zaphod decides to block off sections of his own brains and run for President of the Galaxy, readers are able to glimpse what his original personality was like. His general speech patterns and goof-off personality are the same, but he seems to have moral views and is more likely to go off on life-threatening and exciting quests for the greater good.

== Notes ==
Though it is not stated specifically in the original 1986 version, Adams implies that this unspeakably dangerous creation is then-President Ronald Reagan, a reflection of his critical views of Reagan's policies which also surface in Mostly Harmless. The version of the story first seen in The Wizards of Odd makes this explicit.
