= Graham Chapman =

English actor, comedian and writer (1941–1989)

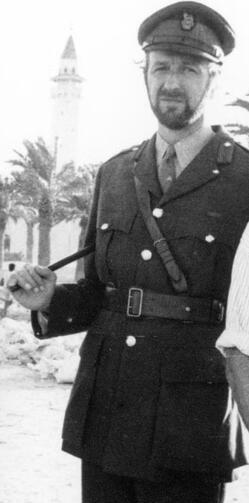
- Chapman as The Colonel
- Born: 8 January 1941; Leicester, England
- Died: 4 October 1989 (aged 48); Maidstone, Kent, England
- Other name: Gray Chapman
- Education: Emmanuel College, Cambridge; St Bartholomew's Hospital Medical College
- Occupations: Actor; comedian; writer
- Years active: 1960–1989
- Known for: One of six members of Monty Python
- Partner: David Sherlock (1966–1989)
- Children: 1 (adopted)

Graham Chapman (8 January 1941 – 4 October 1989) was a British actor, comedian and writer. He was one of the six members of the surrealist comedy group Monty Python. He portrayed authority figures such as The Colonel and the lead role in two Python films, Monty Python and the Holy Grail (1975) and Monty Python's Life of Brian (1979).

Chapman was born in Leicester and grew up in Melton Mowbray. He enjoyed science, acting, and comedy and after graduating from Emmanuel College, Cambridge, and St Bartholomew's Hospital Medical College, he turned down a career as a doctor to be a comedian. He eventually established a writing partnership with John Cleese, which reached its critical peak with Monty Python during the 1970s. Chapman subsequently left Britain for Los Angeles, where he attempted American television, speaking on the college circuit and producing the pirate film Yellowbeard (1983), before returning to Britain in the early 1980s.

Chapman was in a long-term partnership with David Sherlock and supportive of gay rights. He was an alcoholic from his time at Cambridge until he quit drinking shortly before working on Life of Brian. He became an enthusiast and patron of the Dangerous Sports Club in the later years of his life. In 1989, he died of tonsil cancer that had spread to his spine. His life and legacy were commemorated at a memorial service in the Great Hall of St Bartholomew's Hospital two months after his death, in a testament to Chapman's surreal sense of humour that the remaining five members of Monty Python enacted.

== Early life and education ==
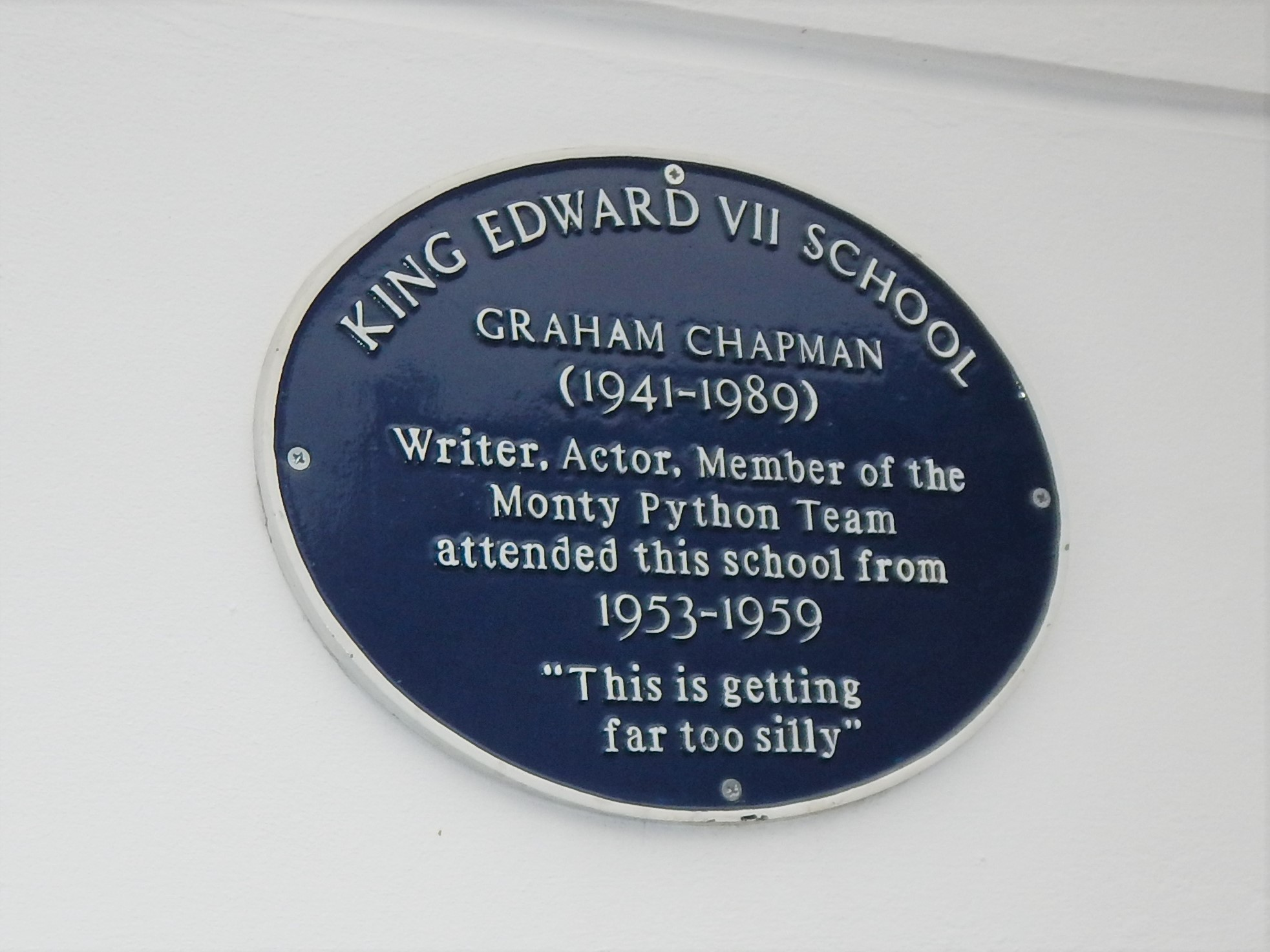
A blue plaque at Melton Mowbray Grammar School (now King Edward VII School), which Chapman attended

Chapman was born on 8 January 1941 at the Stoneygate Nursing Home, Stoneygate, Leicester, the son of policeman Walter Chapman and Edith Towers. Walter Chapman was a police constable at the time of Graham's birth; he ended his career as a chief inspector. He had been trained as a French polisher for a coffin-maker before entering the police force in the 1930s.

Chapman had an elder brother, John, who was born in 1936. They had, according to Chapman and John, an "extremely poor upbringing". One of Chapman's earliest memories was seeing the remains of Polish airmen who had suffered an aeroplane accident near Leicester, later saying the sight remained in his memory.

Chapman was educated at Melton Mowbray Grammar School. He showed a strong affinity for science, sports and amateur dramatics, and was singled out for attention when a local paper reviewed his performance of Mark Antony in Shakespeare's play Julius Caesar. Graham and his brother John were both avid fans of radio comedy, being especially fond of The Goon Show and Robert Moreton's skill of telling jokes the wrong way round and reversing punchlines. Biographer Jim Yoakum said, however, that "the radio shows didn't necessarily make him laugh".

In 1959, Chapman began reading medicine at Emmanuel College, Cambridge. He joined the Cambridge Footlights, where he first began writing with John Cleese. Following graduation, Chapman joined the Footlights show Cambridge Circus and toured New Zealand, deferring his medical studies for a year. After the tour, he continued his studies at St Bartholomew's Medical College, but became torn between whether to pursue a career in medicine or acting. His brother John later said of Chapman that "[Graham] wasn't ever driven to go into medicine... it wasn't his life's ambition."

== Career ==
=== Pre-Python career ===
Following their Footlights success, Chapman and Cleese began to write professionally for the BBC, initially for David Frost but also for Marty Feldman. Frost had recruited Cleese, and in turn Cleese decided he needed Chapman as a sounding board. Chapman also contributed sketches to the radio series I'm Sorry, I'll Read That Again and wrote material on his own and with Bill Oddie. He wrote for The Illustrated Weekly Hudd (starring Roy Hudd), Cilla Black, This Is Petula Clark and This Is Tom Jones. Chapman, Cleese and Tim Brooke-Taylor later joined Feldman in the television comedy series At Last the 1948 Show. It was Chapman's first significant role as a performer as well as a writer and he displayed a gift for deadpan comedy (such as in the sketch "The Minister Who Falls to Pieces") and imitating various British dialects. The series was the first to feature Chapman's sketch of wrestling with himself.

Despite the series' success, Chapman was still unsure about abandoning his medical career. In between the two series of At Last The 1948 Show, he completed his studies at St Bartholomew's and became professionally registered as a doctor. Chapman and Cleese also wrote for the long-running television comedy series Doctor in the House, and both appeared on a one-off television special, How to Irritate People alongside Brooke-Taylor and future Python member Michael Palin. One of Cleese's and Chapman's sketches, featuring a used car salesman refusing to believe a customer's model had broken down, became the inspiration for the Dead Parrot sketch. Chapman also co-wrote several episodes of Doctor in the House's follow up, Doctor in Charge, with Bernard McKenna.

=== Monty Python ===
In 1969, Chapman and Cleese joined the other Pythons, Michael Palin, Eric Idle, Terry Jones and Terry Gilliam, for their sketch comedy series Monty Python's Flying Circus. The group's writing was split into well-defined teams, with Chapman collaborating almost exclusively with Cleese. Chapman was particularly keen to remove stereotypical punchlines in sketches and created The Colonel, who would stop them in mid-flow by saying they were "too silly".

Although the pair were officially equal partners, Cleese later thought that Chapman contributed comparatively little in the way of direct writing, saying "he would come in, say something marvelous and then drift off in his own mind". The other Pythons have said that Chapman's biggest contribution in the writing room was an intuition for what was funny. Gilliam later recalled that "Graham would do the nudge that would push it into something extraordinary". The series was an immediate success, and Chapman was delighted to learn that medical students at St Bartholomew's crowded round the television in the bar to watch it. Chapman was frequently late for rehearsing or recording, leading to the other Pythons calling him "the late Graham Chapman".

Chapman's main contribution to the "Dead Parrot sketch", derived from the piece within How to Irritate People and involving a customer returning a faulty toaster, was "How can we make this madder?", turning the toaster into a dead Norwegian Blue parrot. Cleese later said he and Chapman believed that "there was something very funny there, if we could find the right context for it". Cleese was in particular concerned that the Cheese Shop sketch simply was not funny, in that it was just mainly a man listing different types of cheese. Chapman urged his partner to continue with it, telling him "Trust me, it's funny." When it was read out at the next script meeting, Cleese found that the others, particularly Palin, thought it was hilarious. The group felt that Chapman had the best acting skills among them; Cleese said he was "particularly a wonderful actor".

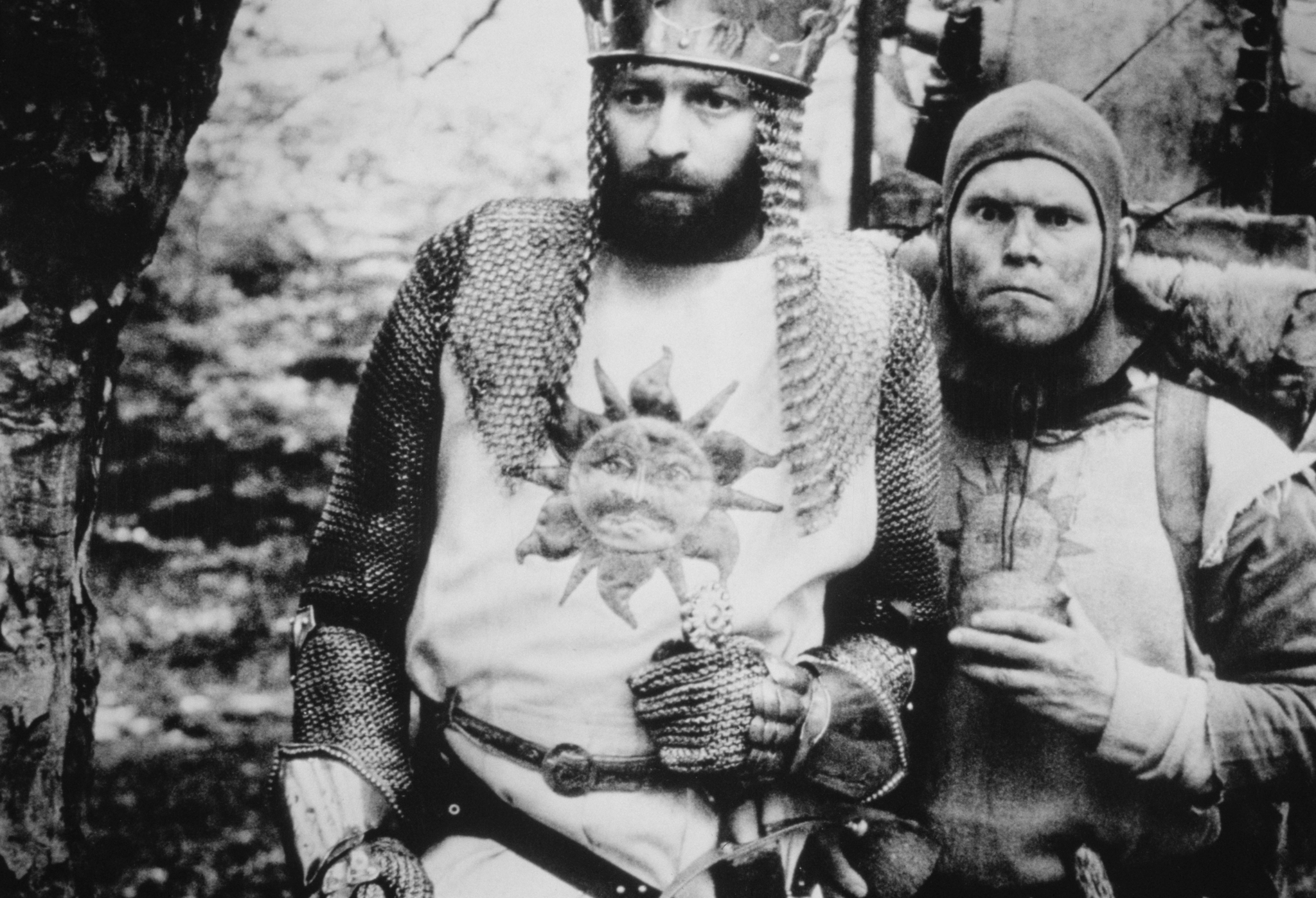
Chapman (left) as King Arthur with Terry Gilliam (right) in a publicity photo for Monty Python and the Holy Grail (1975)

Chapman played the lead role in two Python films, Holy Grail and Life of Brian. He was chosen to play the lead in Holy Grail because of the group's respect for his straight acting skills, and because the other members wanted to play lesser, funnier characters. Chapman did not mind being filmed fully nude in front of a crowd in Life of Brian, but the scene, filmed in Tunisia, caused problems with the female Muslim extras.

=== Other work ===
In 1975, Chapman and Douglas Adams wrote a pilot for a television series, entitled Out of the Trees, but it received poor ratings after being broadcast at the same time as Match of the Day and only the initial episode was produced. In 1978, Chapman co-wrote the comedy film The Odd Job with Bernard McKenna and starred as one of the main characters. Chapman wanted his friend Keith Moon to play a co-lead role alongside him, but Moon could not pass an acting test, so the part went to David Jason who had previously appeared on Do Not Adjust Your Set with Pythons Idle, Jones and Palin. The film was moderately successful. Chapman guest-starred on several television series including The Big Show.

In 1976, Chapman began writing a pirate film, Yellowbeard (1983), which came out of conversations between Chapman and Moon while in Los Angeles. Moon had always wanted to play Long John Silver, so Chapman began to write a script for him. Moon died in 1978 and the work stalled, eventually being rewritten by McKenna, then by Peter Cook. The film, which starred Chapman as the eponymous pirate, also featured appearances from Cook, Feldman, Cleese, Idle, Spike Milligan and Cheech & Chong. It marked the last appearance of Feldman, who suffered a fatal heart attack in December 1982. The project was fraught with financial difficulties and at times there was not enough money to pay the crew. It was released to mixed reviews. David Robinson, reviewing the film in The Times, said that "the Monty Python style of comic anarchy requires more than scatology, rude words and funny faces".

Chapman published his memoirs, A Liar's Autobiography, in 1980, choosing the title because he said "it's almost impossible to tell the truth". He returned to Britain permanently after Yellowbeard was released. He became involved with the extreme sports club Dangerous Sports Club, which popularised bungee jumping. Chapman was scheduled to perform a bungee jump himself, but it was cancelled due to safety concerns.

After reuniting with the other Pythons in the film The Meaning of Life (1983), Chapman began a lengthy series of US college tours, talking about The Pythons, the Dangerous Sports Club and his friend Moon, among other subjects. Saturday Night Live creator and Python fan Lorne Michaels persuaded Chapman to star in The Big Show.

In 1988, Chapman appeared in the Iron Maiden video "Can I Play with Madness". The same year, he starred in a pilot of a proposed television series, Jake's Journey, but financial problems prevented a full series from being made. In 1988, he also appeared on stage with three other Pythons (Gilliam, Jones and Palin) at the 41st British Academy Film Awards where Monty Python received the BAFTA Award for Outstanding British Contribution To Cinema.

Broadcast in November 1989, the 20th anniversary television special, Parrot Sketch Not Included – 20 Years of Monty Python, hosted by Python fan Steve Martin, was Chapman's final onscreen appearance with the other five Python members. Chapman was intended to be cast in the Red Dwarf episode "Timeslides", but died before shooting could begin.

== Personal life ==
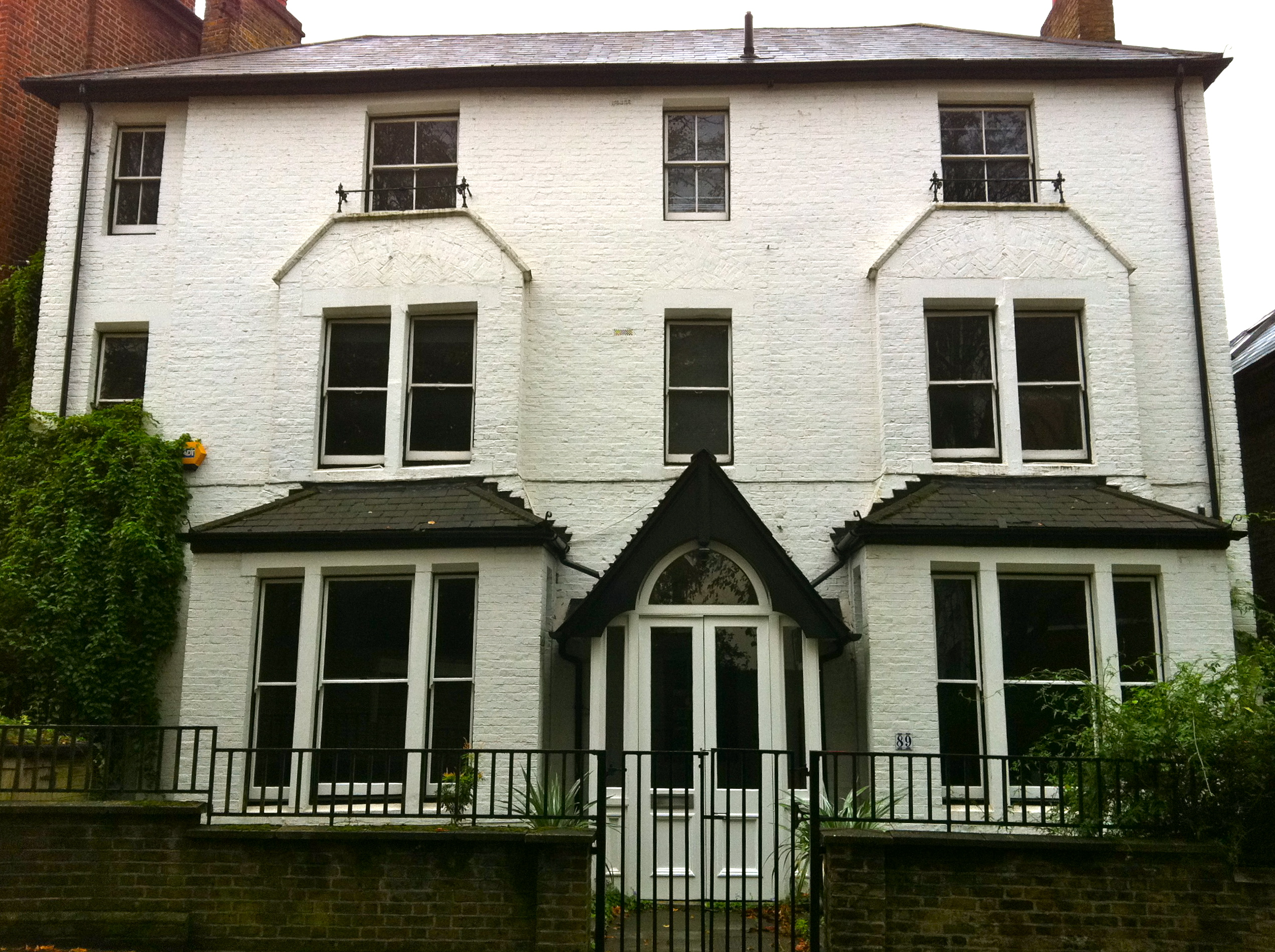
Chapman lived in this house in Highgate with his partner David Sherlock during the 1970s.

Chapman first met his long-term partner David Sherlock in Ibiza in 1966. He later described realising he was gay as "an important moment in my life".

The following year, he told his close friends, including Cleese and Feldman, about his relationship. Chapman and Sherlock moved to Belsize Park in 1968, and the pair enjoyed visiting gay clubs in Central London. In the early 1970s, after Chapman had found fame with Monty Python, they moved to a house in Highgate, North London.

In 1972, on a television show hosted by English jazz and blues singer George Melly, Chapman first disclosed his homosexuality publicly, becoming one of the first celebrities to do so. He was a vocal spokesman for gay rights, supporting the Gay Liberation Front. In 1972, Chapman supported the newspaper Gay News, which listed him as one of the publication's "special friends" in recognition. During a college tour, Chapman mentioned that a television audience member had written to the Pythons to complain about them having a gay member, citing a Bible passage that said any man who lies with a man should be taken out and stoned. Idle replied jokingly that they had found the perpetrator and killed him.

In 1971, Chapman and Sherlock adopted John Tomiczek as their son. Chapman met Tomiczek when Tomiczek was a 14-year-old run-away from Liverpool. After discussions with Tomiczek's father, it was agreed that Chapman would become Tomiczek's legal guardian. Both Sherlock and Tomiczek remained a constant presence in Chapman's life. During the 1970s, Chapman became increasingly concerned about the Pythons' income and finances. He subsequently moved to Los Angeles to avoid British income tax. In the mid-1980s, he returned to the UK and moved to Maidstone, Kent, with Sherlock and Tomiczek. Tomiczek later became Chapman's business manager; he died of a heart attack in 1992 at age 35.

Chapman took up pipe smoking aged 15, which became a lifelong habit. He began drinking heavily during his time at Cambridge and St. Bartholomew's, favouring gin, and became an alcoholic. By the time Monty Python went out on tour in 1973, Chapman's drinking had begun to affect his performance, causing him to miss cues to go on stage, and he was known to suffer from delirium tremens (DTs). He stopped drinking during Christmas 1977, concerned about being able to act in Life of Brian successfully, and remained sober for the rest of his life.

== Illness and death ==
In 1988 Chapman made a routine visit to a dentist, who found a small, malignant tumour on one of his tonsils, leading to both being removed via a tonsillectomy. The following year it was discovered that the cancer had spread into Chapman's spinal column, where another tumour was surgically removed. Chapman had several chemotherapy treatments and surgeries during the final months of his life, but ultimately the cancer was declared inoperable. According to his brother, Chapman was visibly upset by the death of his mother that July, by which time he was terminally ill. Shortly afterwards, Chapman filmed scenes for the 20th anniversary of the first broadcast of Monty Python's Flying Circus, the final time he appeared on television.

Chapman died on 4 October 1989 in Maidstone Hospital from resulting complications, aged 48. At the time of his death, he was being visited by Sherlock, his brother John and his sister-in-law, and fellow Pythons Palin and Cleese, the latter of whom had to be led out of the room to deal with his grief.

Peter Cook had intended to visit, but arrived too late and was visibly shaken by the news. Chapman's death occurred on the eve of the 20th anniversary of the Pythons' collective debut on British television, and Jones called it "the worst case of party-pooping in all history".

=== Memorial service ===
"I guess that we're all thinking how sad it is that a man of such talent, of such capability for kindness, of such unusual intelligence, should now, so suddenly, be spirited away at the age of only forty-eight, before he'd achieved many of the things of which he was capable, and before he'd had enough fun. Well, I feel that I should say, nonsense. Good riddance to him, the freeloading bastard, I hope he fries! And the reason I feel I should say this, is he would never forgive me if I didn't, if I threw away this glorious opportunity to shock you all on his behalf. Anything for him, but mindless good taste."

— John Cleese at Graham Chapman's memorial service

The five surviving Python members had decided to stay away from Chapman's private funeral to prevent it from becoming a media circus and to give his family some privacy. They sent a wreath in the shape of the Python foot, with the message: "To Graham from the other Pythons with all our love. PS: Stop us if we're getting too silly". The Rolling Stones also sent a floral arrangement, saying "Thanks for all the laughs."

A public memorial service for Chapman was held in the Great Hall of St Bartholomew's on 3 December, two months after his death. The service began with a chorus of the hymn "Jerusalem" sung in Engrish with a mock Chinese accent. Cleese delivered a eulogy to Chapman with shock humour that he believed Chapman would have appreciated and became the first person at a televised British memorial service to say "fuck". Palin also delivered a eulogy to Chapman, as did Idle, quipping that Chapman had decided to die rather than listen to Palin again. Idle led the other surviving Pythons and Chapman's close friends and family in a rendition of the song "Always Look on the Bright Side of Life", from Life of Brian, and later closed his remarks by saying: "I'd just like to be the last person at this meeting to say 'fuck'."

Ten years after Chapman's death, his ashes were first rumoured to have been "blasted into the skies in a rocket" with assistance from the Dangerous Sports Club. In a second rumour, Chapman's ashes had been scattered on the mountains of Snowdonia, Wales, which he had visited regularly as a climber.

== Legacy ==
"We would only do a reunion if Chapman came back from the dead. So we're negotiating with his agent."

— Eric Idle on speculation of a Monty Python reunion

Following Chapman's death, reformations of the Pythons have included an urn said to contain his ashes. At the 1998 Aspen Comedy Arts festival, the urn, brought onstage by a stiff English butler, was "accidentally" knocked over by Terry Gilliam, spilling the "ashes" on-stage. The apparently cremated remains were then removed with a DustBuster. Idle recalled meeting Sherlock, saying "I wish he [Chapman] was here now" and Sherlock replied "Oh, but he is. He's in my pocket!"

In 1997, Sherlock allowed Jim Yoakum to start the "Graham Chapman Archives". Later that year, the novel Graham Crackers: Fuzzy Memories, Silly Bits, and Outright Lies was released. It is a semi-sequel to A Liar's Autobiography, with Chapman's works compiled by Yoakum. A compendium of writings, Calcium Made Interesting: Sketches, Letters, Essays & Gondolas, also compiled and edited by Yoakum, was published in 2005 in association with the David Sherlock and John Tomiczek trust. In 2000, Chapman's play O Happy Day was performed by Dad's Garage Theatre Company in Atlanta, Georgia, with the assistance of Cleese and Palin. In 2006, the album and DVD release Looks Like Another Brown Trouser Job came out, featuring a college lecture recorded in April 1988.

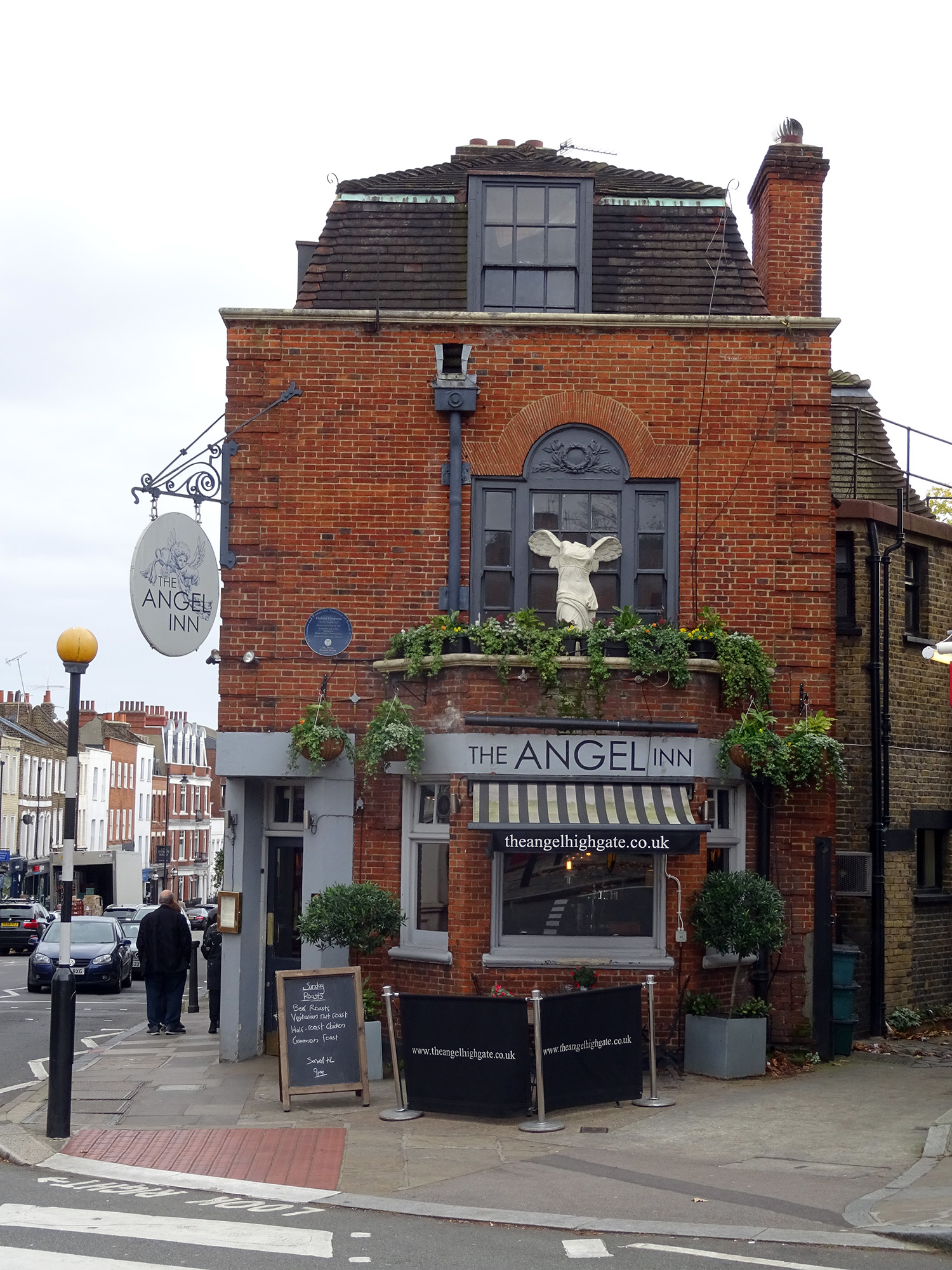
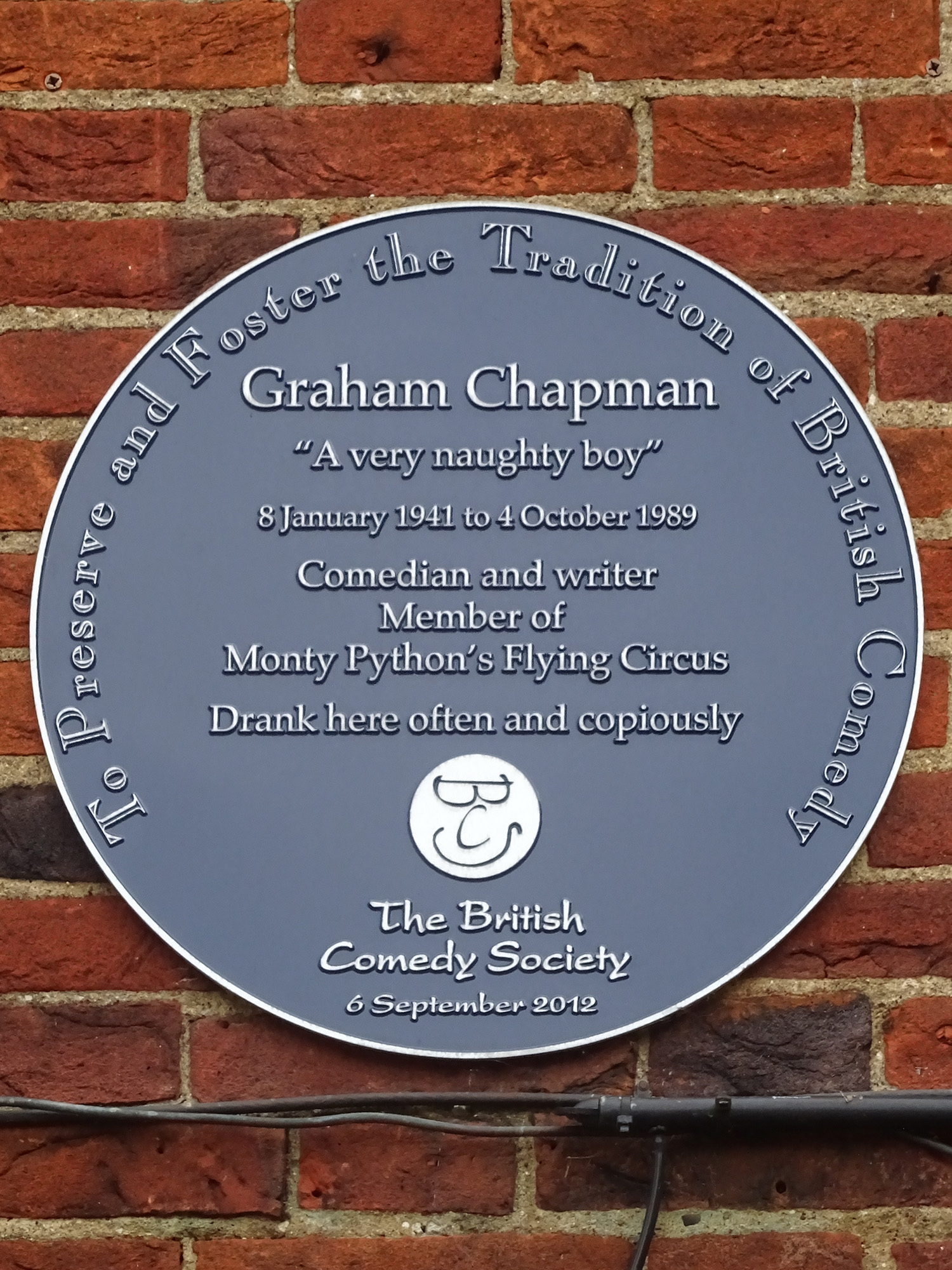
A blue plaque has been placed at The Angel, Highgate, in commemoration of Chapman.

In June 2011, it was announced that Cleese, Jones, Gilliam and Palin would perform in a 3D-animated version of Chapman's memoir A Liar's Autobiography: Volume VI. Co-director Jeff Simpson worked closely with Chapman's estate and the surviving Python members to "get this exactly right". The film, titled A Liar's Autobiography: The Untrue Story of Monty Python's Graham Chapman, was shown at the Toronto International Film Festival in September 2012 and premiered in the UK the following month as part of the BFI London Film Festival. The voices of Cleese, Gilliam, Jones and Palin were spliced into commentary recorded by Chapman reading from his memoir and taped shortly before his death. The film's official trailer quoted Chapman as saying, "This is the best film I've been in since I died."

In September 2012, a British Comedy Society blue plaque commemorating Chapman was unveiled at The Angel pub in Highgate by Jones, Palin, Barry Cryer, Ray Davies and Carol Cleveland. Palin said, "Highgate was his patch, and he should be celebrated because he was a very good, brilliant, funny, nice, wise, kind man, who occasionally drank too much."

In December 2014, a green plaque funded by Leicestershire County Council was placed on Chapman's former home in Burton Road, Melton Mowbray. A year later, a blue plaque at the entrance of Chapman's old school, King Edward VII School, was reported as stolen but was later found inside the building. In March 2017, the plaque was moved to Melton Mowbray town centre.

== Filmography ==
=== Film ===
Year	Film	Role	Notes
1969	The Magic Christian	Oxford Crew	Uncredited; Also writer
1970	Doctor in Trouble	Roddy	
1970	The Rise and Rise of Michael Rimmer	Fromage	Also writer
1971	And Now for Something Completely Different	Various roles	Also writer
1971	The Statue	News reader	
1975	Monty Python and the Holy Grail	King Arthur, various roles	Also writer
1978	The Odd Job	Arthur Harris	Also writer/producer
1979	Monty Python's Life of Brian	Brian, various roles	Also writer
1982	Monty Python Live at the Hollywood Bowl	Various roles	Also writer
1983	Monty Python's The Meaning of Life	Various roles	Also writer
1983	The Crimson Permanent Assurance	Clerk	Short film; Uncredited
1983	Yellowbeard	Captain Yellowbeard	Also writer
1987	Still Crazy Like a Fox	Detective Inspector Palmer	TV film
1988	Jake's Journey	Sir George/Queen	TV film; Also writer
1989	Stage Fright	Smart Alec	Uncredited
2012	A Liar's Autobiography: The Untrue Story of Monty Python's Graham Chapman	Himself (Archive footage)	Voice
2014	Monty Python Live (Mostly)	The Colonel and other characters (archive footage)	Also writer

=== Television ===
Year	Film	Role	Notes
1967	At Last the 1948 Show	Various roles	Also writer; 13 episodes
1967–1970	No – That's Me Over Here!	Man on Train	Also creator; 1 episode
1968	Broaden Your Mind	Various roles	1 episode
1968	How to Irritate People	Various roles	Also writer
1969–1974	Monty Python's Flying Circus	Various roles	Also writer; 45 episodes
1972	Monty Python's Fliegender Zirkus	Various roles	2 episodes
1976–1982	Saturday Night Live	Himself	2 episodes
1976	Out of the Trees	Various roles	Also writer; 1 episode

=== Music videos ===
Year	Song	Artist	Role	Notes
1988	"Can I Play with Madness"	Iron Maiden	Teacher	One of his final television appearances

== Bibliography ==
- McCabe, Bob (2005). The Life of Graham, The authorised biography of Graham Chapman. London: Orion Books. ISBN 978-0-7528-5773-2.
- McCall, Douglas (2013). Monty Python: A Chronology, 1969–2012 (2nd ed.). McFarland. ISBN 978-0-7864-7811-8.
- Chapman, Graham; Yoakum, Jim (2006). Jim Yoakum (ed.). Calcium Made Interesting: Sketches, Letters, Essays & Gondolas. London: Sidgwick & Jackson. ISBN 978-0-330-43543-7.
- Chapman, Graham (1997). Graham Crackers: Fuzzy Memories, Silly Bits, and Outright Lies. Career Pr Inc. ISBN 978-1-56414-334-1.
- Hewison, Robert (1983). Footlights! – A Hundred Years of Cambridge Comedy. London: Methuen London. ISBN 978-0-413-51150-8.
- Perry, George (2007). The Life of Python. Pavilion. ISBN 978-1-86205-762-3.
- Wilmut, Roger (1980). From Fringe to Flying Circus – 'Celebrating a Unique Generation of Comedy 1960–1980'. Eyre Methuen. ISBN 978-0-413-46950-2.
- Chapman, Graham (1980). A Liar's Autobiography (Volume VI). Methuen Publishing. ISBN 978-0-413-77728-7.
- Wholey, Dennis (1984). "4 – "Quitting"". The Courage to Change: hope and help for alcoholics and their families — Personal Conversations about Alcoholism. Warner Books. ISBN 978-0-446-35758-6.
- Marasco, Ron; Shuff, Brian (2010). About Grief: Insights, Setbacks, Grace Notes, Taboos. Rowman & Littlefield. ISBN 978-1-56663-858-6.
