= List of The Hitchhiker's Guide to the Galaxy characters =

The Hitchhiker's Guide to the Galaxy is a comedy science fiction franchise created by Douglas Adams. Originally a 1978 radio comedy, it was later adapted to other formats, including novels, stage shows, comic books, a 1981 TV series, a 1984 text adventure game, and 2005 feature film. The various versions follow the same basic plot. However, in many places, they are mutually contradictory, as Adams rewrote the story substantially for each new adaptation. Throughout all versions, the series follows the adventures of Arthur Dent and his interactions with Ford Prefect, Zaphod Beeblebrox, Marvin the Paranoid Android, and Trillian.

== Main characters ==
=== Arthur Dent ===
Arthur Philip Dent, accompanied by Ford Prefect, barely escapes the Earth's destruction when it is demolished to make way for a hyperspace bypass. Arthur spends the next several years, still wearing his dressing gown, helplessly launched from crisis to crisis while trying to straighten out his lifestyle. He rather enjoys tea, but seems to have trouble obtaining it in the far reaches of the galaxy. In time, he learns how to fly (not in an airplane—but by throwing himself at the ground and missing) and carves a niche for himself as a sandwich maker. He is also worried about "everything."

=== Ford Prefect ===
Ford Prefect is Arthur Dent's friend. He rescued Dent when the Earth is unexpectedly demolished to make way for a hyperspace bypass at the start of the story. Although his heart is in the right place and he is shown to be highly intelligent, resourceful, and even brave, Ford is essentially a dilettante when it comes to causes such as the search for the question to the ultimate answer of "life, the universe, and everything." Ford takes a more existential view of the universe, sometimes bordering on joyful nihilism. He is eccentric and broad-minded – no doubt due to his vast experience of roughing it around the galaxy – and has an off-key and often very dark sense of humour.

=== Zaphod Beeblebrox ===
Zaphod Beeblebrox is a "semi-half-cousin" of Ford Prefect. He is hedonistic and irresponsible, narcissistic, and often extremely insensitive to the feelings of those around him. Zaphod invented the Pan Galactic Gargle Blaster. Zaphod wears unique clothing that contains a mixture of bright and contrasting colours to make him stand out and be the centre of attention wherever he goes. He was voted "Worst Dressed Sentient Being in the Known Universe" seven consecutive times. He's been described as "the best Bang since the Big One" by Eccentrica Gallumbits, and as "one hoopy frood" by others. He was briefly the President of the Galaxy and is the only man to have survived the Total Perspective Vortex (In the artificial galaxy created by Zarniwoop).

=== Marvin the Paranoid Android ===
Marvin the Paranoid Android is the ship's robot aboard the starship Heart of Gold. Built as one of many failed prototypes of Sirius Cybernetics Corporation's GPP (Genuine People Personalities) technology, Marvin is afflicted with severe depression and boredom, in part because he has a "brain the size of a planet" which he is seldom, if ever, given the chance to use. Indeed, the true horror of Marvin's existence is that no task he could be given would occupy even the tiniest fraction of his vast intellect. Marvin claims he is 50,000 times more intelligent than a human.

=== Trillian ===
Trillian (Tricia McMillan) is a mathematician and astrophysicist whom Arthur Dent attempted to talk to at a party in Islington. Zaphod Beeblebrox gate-crashed said party and Trillian left the planet along with him. She and Arthur next meet six months later on the spaceship Heart of Gold, shortly after the Earth had been destroyed to make way for a hyperspace bypass.

=== Slartibartfast ===
Slartibartfast is a Magrathean, and a designer of planets. His favourite part of the job is creating coastlines, the most notable of which are the fjords found on the coast of Norway on planet Earth, for which he won an award. When Earth Mk. II is being made, Slartibartfast is assigned to the continent of Africa. He is unhappy about this because he has begun "doing it with fjords again" (arguing that they give a continent a lovely baroque feel), but has been told by his superiors that they are "not equatorial enough". In relation to this, he expresses the view that he would "far rather be happy than right any day." By the third novel, he has joined the Campaign for Real Time and convinces the main characters to join him to attempting to save the Galaxy from murderous robots.

== Minor characters ==
=== Agrajag ===
Agrajag is a tragic and piteous creature who is continually reincarnated and subsequently killed, each time unknowingly, by Arthur Dent. Agrajag is first identified in the novel Life, the Universe and Everything; however, it is revealed that several of Arthur's encounters in the first and second novels (and in previous chapters of the third) were with previous incarnations of Agrajag. The first occurs in the novel The Hitchhiker's Guide to the Galaxy, when a bowl of petunias is yanked into existence miles above the planet Magrathea in place of one of the missiles targeting the Heart of Gold after its Improbability Drive is used, and begins falling, having only time to think "Oh, no, not again" before crashing to the ground. The Guide states that "many had speculated that if we knew exactly why the bowl of petunias had thought that, we should know a lot more about the nature of the universe than we do now". The reason behind the bowl's lament is revealed in the novel Life, the Universe and Everything, when Agrajag identifies the bowl of petunias as one of his prior incarnations, and tells Arthur that he had seen his face in a spaceship window as he fell to his doom. In another incarnation, Agrajag was a rabbit on prehistoric Earth (during the time period recounted in the novel The Restaurant at the End of the Universe) who was killed by Arthur for breakfast and whose skin was fashioned into the pouch Arthur is still carrying, which is then used to swat a fly who also happened to be Agrajag. In yet another, near the beginning of the novel Life, the Universe and Everything, Agrajag is an old man who dies of a heart attack after seeing Arthur and Ford materialise, seated on a Chesterfield sofa, in the midst of a match at Lord's Cricket Ground.

In due course, Agrajag harbors a fervent desire for vengeance against Arthur Dent, scheming to redirect his teleportation to a Cathedral of Hate. However, in the midst of articulating his animosity towards Arthur, Agrajag references an incident at "Stavromula Beta" where Arthur inadvertently evaded an assassin's bullet, causing Agrajag's demise. Perplexed by this mention of a place he's never visited, Arthur remains oblivious to Agrajag's grievances, leading Agrajag to realize his premature timing in bringing Arthur to the cathedral. Despite this revelation, Agrajag still attempts to eliminate Arthur, only to meet his demise once again at Arthur's hands while the latter defends himself. In a final act of defiance, Agrajag sets off explosives meant to dispatch Arthur; however, this triggers a colossal rockfall. Miraculously, Arthur emerges unscathed from the debris.

For the next few years, Arthur travels the universe, secure in his knowledge that, no matter what happens, he cannot die at least until after he survives his assassination attempt at Stavromula Beta. In the novel Mostly Harmless, Arthur's daughter Random Frequent Flyer Dent holds him hostage in a London club. When she fires her weapon, Arthur dodges, causing the bolt to pass over his head and hit the man standing behind him. Earlier, the victim (Agrajag) had dropped a book of matches which revealed the owner of the nightclub to be Stavro Mueller, and the name of the club to be Beta. Thus, what Arthur believed to be the name of a planet was the name of the nightclub, and Agrajag has died once again. Because of this, Arthur is now able to die as well, which, thanks to the Grebulons, he does a few seconds later.

In Fit the Fifteenth of the radio series, Douglas Adams plays Agrajag, having recorded the part for an audiobook version of the novel Life, the Universe and Everything. Producer Dirk Maggs added a suitable voice treatment, and Simon Jones as Arthur Dent recorded his lines opposite the pre-recorded Adams. Adams was thus able to "reincarnate" to participate in the new series.

At the end of the novel And Another Thing..., Arthur Dent's extreme bad luck in life coupled with cosmic balance mean that as he materialises on a planet shortly before Vogons are due to destroy it, Agrajag wakes up from a coma after six months having won the lottery and been recognised by a long lost love whilst on "Celebrity Coma". This event presumably leads to cosmic balance ruining his other lives for the benefit of Arthur Dent.

Agrajag makes a brief appearance in his bowl of petunias form in the 2005 film; the moment he and the sperm whale were called into existence being portrayed exactly as it was in the first book.

In the 2017 second season of the television adaptation of Dirk Gently's Holistic Detective Agency a dog is named Agrajag with expected consequences.

=== Mrs Alice Beeblebrox ===
Alice Beeblebrox is Zaphod's favourite mother, lives at 10^{8} Astral Crescent, Zoovroozlechester, Betelgeuse V, and guards the true story of Zaphod's visit to the Frogstar, waiting for "the right price." She is referenced in Fit the Eighth of the radio series.

=== The Allitnils ===
As their names were written to suggest, every Allitnil is an anti-clone of a Lintilla. They were created by the cloning company to eliminate the billions of cloned Lintillas flooding out of a malfunctioning cloning machine. Being anti-clones, when an Allitnil comes into physical contact with a Lintilla, they both wink out of existence in a puff of unsmoke.

Along with Poodoo and Varntvar the Priest, three Allitnils arrived on Brontitall to get the three Lintillas there to "agree to cease to be". Two of the clones eliminate their corresponding Lintillas, but Arthur shoots the third Allitnil, so that one Lintilla survives.

Appearing only in Fit the Twelfth of the radio series, every one of the Allitnils is voiced by David Tate.

The Allitnils, like the Lintillas, do not appear in the novels nor in the BBC television series.

=== Almighty Bob ===
The Almighty Bob is a deity worshipped by the people of Lamuella. Old Thrashbarg is one of the priests who worships Almighty Bob; however, Thrashbarg is often ignored by the villagers of Lamuella. The Almighty Bob is mentioned multiple times in the fifth book, the novel Mostly Harmless.

=== Anjie ===
Anjie was a woman, on the brink of retirement, on whose behalf a raffle was being held in order to buy her a kidney machine. An unnamed woman (played by June Whitfield on the radio) convinces Arthur Dent to buy raffle tickets while he and Fenchurch are in a railway pub, attempting to have lunch. Arthur won an album of bagpipe music.

She is referred to in the novel So Long, and Thanks for All the Fish

=== Arcturan Megafreighter crew ===
The captain and first officer were the only crew of an Arcturan Megafreighter carrying a larger number of copies of Playbeing magazine than the mind can comfortably conceive. They brought Zaphod Beeblebrox to Ursa Minor Beta, after he had escaped from the Haggunenon flagship. Zaphod was let on board by the Number One, who was cynical about the Guide's editors becoming soft. He admired the fact that Zaphod was "hitching the hard way".

They only appear in Fit the Seventh of the radio series, where the captain is played by David Tate, and his number one by Bill Paterson. However, some of their dialogue was given to other characters in the novel The Restaurant at the End of the Universe.

=== Aseed ===
Aseed is the leader of the cheese-worshipping Tyromancers on the planet Nano. He appears in the novel And Another Thing....

=== Barmen ===
Three different barmen appear during the series.

==== Barman of the Horse and Groom ====
In the novel The Hitchhiker's Guide to the Galaxy, in episode 1 of the TV series, and the film, Ford and Arthur quickly down three pints each – at lunchtime – to calm their muscles before using the teleport to escape on the Vogon ship. Being told the world is about to end he calls "last orders, please." The Red Lion Inn at Chelwood Gate, East Sussex, was used during the TV series, and referenced in the dialogue (Adams himself can be seen in the background of this scene); Steve Conway played the character on TV. This barman was played by David Gooderson in the original radio series and Stephen Moore in the LP recording. In the 2005 motion picture, Albie Woodington portrayed the barman.

==== Barman in Old Pink Dog Bar ====
Ford visits the Old Pink Dog Bar in Han Dold City, orders a round for everyone and then tries to use an American Express card to pay for it, fails, is threatened by a disembodied hand and so offers a Guide write-up instead. This happens in the novel So Long, and Thanks for All the Fish. In the radio adaptation of this novel, the barman was played by Arthur Smith.

==== Barman in the Domain of the King ====
Another barman takes a galactic sized tip for the song Love Me Tender by Elvis Presley from Ford on his Hitchhiker's corporate Dine-O-Charge credit card in an attempt to bankrupt InfiniDim Enterprises in the novel Mostly Harmless and the final radio series. This bartender was played by Roger Gregg in the radio series.

=== BBC department head ===
When Arthur returns to Earth in the novel So Long, and Thanks for All the Fish, he calls his department head to explain why he was absent from work the last six months: "I've gone mad." His superior is very relaxed about it and asks when Arthur will return to work, and is quite satisfied by the reply "When do hedgehogs stop hibernating?" In the fourth radio series, the part was played by Geoffrey Perkins, who had produced the first two radio series and who had been the BBC TV head of comedy from 1995 to 2001.

=== Blart Versenwald III ===
In the epilogue of the novel So Long, and Thanks for All the Fish, Blart Versenwald III was a top genetic engineer, and a man who could never keep his mind on the job at hand. When his homeworld was under threat from an invading army, he was tasked with creating an army of super-soldiers to fight them. Instead, he created (among other things) a remarkable new breed of superfly that could distinguish between solid glass and an open window, and also an off-switch for children. Fortunately, because the invaders were only invading because they couldn't cope with things back home, they too were impressed with Blart's creations, and a flurry of economic treaties rapidly secured peace.

=== Bodyguard ===
The strong silent type, an unnamed bodyguard is seen guarding the late Hotblack Desiato in the novel The Restaurant at the End of the Universe. His face, according to the book "had the texture of an orange and the colour of an apple, but there the resemblance to anything sweet ended." In episode 5 of the TV series he is portrayed by actor David Prowse, Star Wars' Darth Vader, as a man of few words who can lift Ford Prefect clean off the floor. In the LP adaptation of the radio series, the character was voiced by David Tate.

=== Caveman ===
Arthur attempts to play Scrabble with a caveman, who is not even able to spell "Grunt" and "Agh", and "he's probably spelt library with one R again". However, he does spell "forty-two", giving Arthur the idea to pull out letters from the letters bag at random to attempt to find the ultimate question; this results in the unhelpful "What do you get when you multiply six by nine?" which does not match the answer (except in base 13).

The caveman appears in Fit the Sixth of the radio series played by David Jason, the novel The Restaurant at the End of the Universe, and episode 6 of the TV series.

=== Colin ===
Colin (a.k.a. part #223219B) is a small, round, melon-sized, flying security robot which Ford Prefect enslaves to aid in his escape from the newly re-organized Guide offices in the novel Mostly Harmless. "Its motion sensors are the usual Sirius Cybernetics garbage." Ford captures Colin by trapping the robot with his towel and re-wiring the robot's pleasure circuits, inducing a cyber-ecstasy trip.

Ford uses Colin's cheerfulness to break into the Guide's corporate accounting software in order to plant a Trojan Horse module that will automatically pay anything billed to his InfiniDim Enterprises credit card. Colin also saves Ford's life when the Guide's new security force, the Vogons, fire at him with a rocket launcher after Ford feels the need to jump out of the window. Colin was last seen being sent (at the risk of possible incineration) to look after the delivery of the Guide Mark II to Arthur Dent in the Vogon postal system.

Colin was named after a dog which belonged to a girl, Emily Saunders, of whom Ford had fond memories. Colin appears in the novel Mostly Harmless, and in the radio series he was played by Andrew Secombe.

=== Constant Mown ===
Constant Mown is a crew member on the Vogon ship commanded by Prostetnic Vogon Jeltz; he is also Jeltz's son. He is notable for his very un-Vogon-like emotions, ethics and agility, all of which he attempts to keep hidden (with varying degrees of success) from his father and crewmates, lest he be demoted to more unpleasant (even for a Vogon) duties or killed outright for aberrant behaviour. Appears in the novel And Another Thing....

=== Dr. Dan Streetmentioner ===
Author of Time Traveller's Handbook of 1001 Tense Formations which is handy for those travelling through time, and especially to Milliways. His guide is more complete than The Guide itself, which ignores the time travel tense topic – other than pointing out that the term 'future perfect' has been abandoned since it was discovered not to be. He is also mentioned in the third radio series, which gives many examples of his tense forms.

=== Deep Thought ===
Deep Thought is a computer that was created by a pan-dimensional, hyper-intelligent species of beings (whose three-dimensional protrusions into our universe are ordinary white mice) to come up with the Answer to The Ultimate Question of Life, the Universe, and Everything. Deep Thought is the size of a small city. When, after seven and a half million years of calculation, the answer finally turns out to be 42, Deep Thought admonishes Loonquawl and Phouchg (the receivers of the Ultimate Answer) that "[they] checked it very thoroughly, and that quite definitely is the answer. I think the problem, to be quite honest with you, is that you've never actually known what the question was."

Deep Thought does not know the ultimate question to Life, the Universe and Everything, but offers to design an even more powerful computer, Earth, to calculate it. After ten million years of calculation, the Earth is destroyed by Vogons five minutes before the computation is complete.

Deep Thought appears in the novel The Hitchhiker's Guide to the Galaxy.

On radio, Deep Thought was voiced by Geoffrey McGivern. On television and in the LP re-recording of the radio series, it was voiced by Valentine Dyall. In the feature film, Deep Thought's voice was provided by actress Helen Mirren.

In the television series, Deep Thought was shaped like a massive black metal trapezoid with a yellow rectangular display that blinked on and off in time with the computer's speaking. The timing of the light's flashing was done on set by author Douglas Adams. Valentine Dyall's voice was dubbed in later.

In the feature film, it appears as a large, vaguely humanoid computer, with a gigantic head supported, as if in bored repose, by two arms and has a female voice (provided by actress Helen Mirren). This particular version of Deep Thought likes to watch television in her spare time and late in the film can also be seen to have the Apple Computer logo above her eye. This is a reference to Adams being a fan and advocate of the Apple Macintosh. It is also revealed that, in the intervening time, Deep Thought was commissioned by an intergalactic consortium of angry housewives to create the Point of View Gun, a weapon that causes any man it is used on to see things from the firer's point-of-view, regardless of the firer's gender (due to it being originally used by those housewives having got fed up with ending arguments with their husbands with the phrase "You just don't get it, do you?").

IBM's chess-playing computer Deep Thought was named in honour of this fictional computer.

Deep Thought can be seen inscribed on a computer in the NORAD VI area of the 1992 computer game The Journeyman Project.

=== Dionah Carlinton Housney ===
Dionah appears in And Another Thing... by Eoin Colfer. Dionah is one of Zaphod Beeblebrox's favourite singer/prostitutes. She appears out of nowhere in the "Heart of Gold" starship and sings Zaphod a cryptic song about the entrance to the planet Asgard. Zaphod does not understand the song. She vanishes after saying "oh for Zark's sake" and then turns into an ice sculpture of herself. The sculpture soon melts into water, the water droplets rise up into the ceiling and every drop disappears after making an "oh" sound. Zaphod later comments "That girl always could sing".

=== Disaster Area's chief research accountant ===
As Disaster Area's earnings require hypermathematics, their chief research accountant was named Professor of Neomathematics at the University of Maximegalon and in his Special Theories of Tax Returns he proves that space-time is "not merely curved, it is, in fact, totally bent." The Guide shows a graphic indicating that most of the earnings ends up with the accountant.

Referred to in:

- the novel The Restaurant at the End of the Universe
- episode 5 of the TV series

=== Dish of the Day ===
The quadruped Dish of the Day is an Ameglian Major Cow, a ruminant specifically bred to not only have the desire to be eaten, but to be capable of saying so quite clearly. When asked if he would like to see the Dish of the Day, Zaphod replies, "We'll meet the meat." The Major Cow's quite vocal and emphatic desire to be consumed by Milliways' patrons is the most revolting thing that Arthur Dent has ever heard, and the Dish is nonplussed by a queasy Arthur's subsequent order of a green salad, since it knows "many vegetables that are very clear" on the point of not wanting to be eaten – which was part of the reason for the creation of the Ameglian Major Cow in the first place. After Zaphod orders four rare steaks, the Dish announces that it is nipping off to the kitchen to shoot itself. Though it states, "I'll be very humane," this does not comfort Arthur at all.

Several years later, the principal characters encounter a herd of Ameglian Major Cows on the planet Nano, a colony planet established for exceedingly rich refugees from the destroyed Earth. Ford and Arthur (who is now far more open-minded after years spent traversing the galaxy) seriously consider the Cows' offering themselves as a meal, only to be interrupted by the arrival of the Norse thunder god Thor and his subsequent duel with Bowerick Wowbagger. However, the lightning display accompanying Thor's arrival kills and chars several Major Cows (while their still-living herdmates curse their fellows' luck), and Ford and Arthur take the opportunity to sample the cooked meat. Later, a Major Cow is shown offering itself to Thor at the thunder god's victory party.

Appears in:

- the novel The Restaurant at the End of the Universe
- episode 5 of the TV series
- the novel And Another Thing...

The character is not present in the original radio series, but does make a cameo appearance in the finale of the fifth radio series. The first appearance of it was in a stage adaptation in 1980 at the Rainbow Theatre. Since then it appeared in the novel The Restaurant at the End of the Universe, and episode 5 of the TV series. In the TV series, it was played by Peter Davison, who was at that time both Sandra Dickinson's husband and the newly announced fifth Doctor. Dickinson played Trillian in the television series (and "Tricia McMillan" in the final radio series), and suggested casting Davison, who was a fan of the radio series.

=== East River Creature ===
As Ford Prefect travels through space in a Sirius Cybernetics Corporation spaceship, he has a dream in which he encounters a strange creature made of slime from the East River in New York who has just come into existence. After asking Ford a series of questions about life, and Ford's recommendation of finding love on 7th Avenue, the creature leaves Ford to talk to a nearby policeman on his status in life.

Appearances:

- the novel So Long, and Thanks for All the Fish
- Fit the Twenty-First of the radio series

In Fit the Twenty-First of the radio series, the East River character was played by American comedian Jackie Mason.

=== Eccentrica Gallumbits ===
Known as "The Triple-Breasted Whore of Eroticon Six", Eccentrica Gallumbits, the author of The Big Bang Theory – A Personal View, is mentioned in all six of the novels. She is first mentioned in The Hitchhiker's Guide to the Galaxy when Arthur looks up Earth for the first time in the guide. The entry for Earth precedes that for Eccentrica Gallumbits. She is heard about again during a newscast that Zaphod Beeblebrox tunes into shortly after stealing the spaceship Heart of Gold. The newsreader quotes Eccentrica describing Zaphod as "The best bang since the Big One." It was also reported in Fit the Ninth of the radio series that Zaphod had delivered a presidential address from her bedroom on at least one occasion. Commentary on Zaphod in the novel And Another Thing... intimates that one reason for his acquiring a third arm is the ability to fondle all of Eccentrica's breasts at the same time.

Pears Gallumbit, a dessert which has several things in common with her, is available at Milliways.

Some people say her erogenous zones start some four miles from her actual body; Ford Prefect disagrees, saying five.

She is referenced in an issue of the Legion of Super Heroes.

She is again mentioned in the novel And Another Thing... after a wheel of cheese appears above the Nanites: "This sudden and most unexpected apparition shifted the crowd's focus faster than the appearance of Eccentrica Gallumbits wearing a neon T-shirt flashing the slogan Freebie Friday would shift the focus of the crowd at a VirginNerd convention on a Friday."

=== Eddie ===
Eddie is the name of the shipboard computer on the starship Heart of Gold. Like every other system on the spaceship, it has a Sirius Cybernetics Corporation Genuine People Personality. Thus, Eddie is over-excitable, quite talkative, over-enthused and ingratiating, or alternatively a coddling, school matron-type as a back-up personality. Shipboard networking interconnects Eddie with everything on the Heart of Gold; at one point, the whole ship is effectively crippled by Arthur Dent's request for tea from the Nutrimatic drinks dispenser; the computation of which nearly crashed Eddie and everything connected to him.

On one occasion when certain destruction seems quite imminent, Eddie sings "You'll Never Walk Alone" in a cheesy and upbeat tone.

Appears in:

- the novel The Hitchhiker's Guide to the Galaxy
- the novel The Restaurant at the End of the Universe
- the novel Life, the Universe and Everything
- the video game The Hitchhiker's Guide to the Galaxy

He is voiced in the first two radio series and on television by David Tate. In the television version, Eddie has lights on his case that flash when he speaks. Douglas Adams read in Eddie's lines during filming to operate the lights.

In the 2004–2005 radio series, he is voiced by Roger Gregg and in the 2005 feature film by Thomas Lennon.

=== Effrafax of Wug ===
A sciento-magician who bet his life that he could make an entire mountain invisible within a year. Having wasted most of the period of time failing to create a cloaking device, he hired a company to simply remove the mountain, though this course of action lost him the bet, and his life. This was all due in part to the sudden and rather suspicious presence of an extra moon, and in addition, the fact that you could never touch anything when you walked near the supposed invisible mountain. It is remarked that he should have established a simple Somebody Else's Problem field, which would make the mountain invisible even if it were to be painted bright pink.

Referenced in: the novel Life, the Universe and Everything.

=== Elders of Krikkit ===
The Elders of Krikkit were, in the novel Life, the Universe and Everything, under influence of the remains of the supercomputer Hactar, which æons previously had been blown to dust. However, they retained a measure of consciousness, and determined to destroy the entire universe using the supernova bomb they had built. Trillian used her feminine charm and smart rhetoric in an attempt to dissuade the elders, but failed to stop them deploying the ultimate weapon, which simply dented the council chamber badly.

=== Elvis Presley ===
Elvis Presley is a real-life singer, who died in 1977. It has been suggested that he has been abducted by aliens, or that he is actually an alien who faked his own death so he could return to his home planet.

In the novel Mostly Harmless, Elvis is discovered by Ford Prefect and Arthur Dent working as a bar singer on an alien planet, and owning a large pink spaceship. Ford, having become a huge fan of Elvis while he was stranded on Earth, watched the performance intently for its entire duration. Presley is not actually named, but his identity is easy to determine from the facts that the bar is called "The Domain of The King," the "EP" initials in the pink spaceship which Ford and Arthur buy from him, and the accent in which he sings. He tells Ford that, contrary to popular belief, he was not abducted by aliens; he went with them of his own free will.

Ford's irreplaceable blue suede shoes, one of which is destroyed during the events in the early part of the novel Mostly Harmless, are a tribute to his Elvis fandom.

In the radio adaptation of the novel Mostly Harmless, the radio series The Quintessential Phase, it has been indicated that in the alternate Earth which is the focus of the story, Elvis never died, and there is mention of an album "Elvis sings Oasis". He appears (but is not directly named) in Fit the Twenty-Sixth of the radio series, voiced by Philip Pope.

=== Emperor of the Galaxy ===
Many millennia prior to the events of the series, the final Emperor of the Galactic Empire (in the Hitchhiker's universe) was placed into a stasis field during his dying moments: thus leaving the Empire with a technically ruling, but actually near-dead Emperor, with all his heirs long since dead. And so today, an Imperial President, elected by the Galactic Assembly, has all the trappings of power, without actually wielding any. This was the office held by Yooden Vranx and Zaphod Beeblebrox.

Mentioned in:

- Fit the Ninth of the radio series
- the novel The Hitchhiker's Guide to the Galaxy

=== Mrs Enid Kapelsen ===
Mrs Enid Kapelsen is an old woman from Boston who rediscovers purpose in life by seeing Arthur and Fenchurch flying (and performing "other activities") outside the aeroplane within which she is flying to Heathrow. Witnessing this, she became enlightened, and realized that everything she had ever been taught was varyingly incorrect. She annoys the flight attendants by continually pressing her call button for reasons such as "the child in front was making milk come out of his nose." Later she ends up seated next to Arthur and Fenchurch on another aeroplane en route from Los Angeles to London (though in the original radio series, she flies with Arthur and Fenchurch on a flight from London to Los Angeles).

Appears in:

- the novel So Long, and Thanks for All the Fish

She was played by Margaret Robertson in Fit the Twenty-First of the radio series during the Quandary Phase.

=== Eric Bartlett ===
In the novel Mostly Harmless, it is gardener Eric Bartlett who discovers that space-aliens have landed on Tricia's lawn and haven't cut her grass.

=== Fenchurch ===
Fenchurch is Arthur Dent's soulmate in the fourth book of the Hitchhiker "trilogy", the novel So Long, and Thanks for All the Fish. Fenchurch was named after the Fenchurch Street railway station where she was conceived in the ticket queue. Adams revealed in an interview that it was really the ticket queues at Paddington Station that made him think of conceiving a character there, but chose Fenchurch to avoid complications with Paddington Bear.

She first appears as the unnamed girl in the café on the first page of the novel The Hitchhiker's Guide to the Galaxy; she is the girl referred to as "sitting on her own in a small café in Rickmansworth." In the novel So Long, and Thanks for All the Fish, when the Earth and everyone including Fenchurch had mysteriously reappeared, a romantic relationship blooms between her and Arthur Dent. He teaches her to fly, before a first aerial sexual encounter, and a second with a Sony Walkman.

At the beginning of the novel Mostly Harmless, Fenchurch is referred to as having vanished during a hyperspace jump on their first intergalactic holiday. Douglas Adams later said that he wanted to get rid of the character as she was getting in the way of the story. Much of this is evident from the self-referential prose surrounding Arthur and Fenchurch's relationship.

In Fit the Twenty-Sixth of the radio series, she is revealed to have been working as a waitress at Milliways since she vanished, and is reunited with Arthur Dent.

In Fit the Nineteenth of the radio series to Fit the Twenty-Second of the radio series and Fit the Twenty-Sixth of the radio series, Fenchurch is played by actress Jane Horrocks.

She appears in the television series played by an uncredited actress for the "girl in a café in Rickmansworth" segment from the second episode. Her appearance corresponds to the one described in So Long, and Thanks for All the Fish.

In the novel And Another Thing..., the computer of the Tanngrisnir takes the form of Fenchurch in its programmed attempts to live out the sub-conscious desires of the ship's occupiers. While in this form she and Arthur talk and ponder together, exacerbated by the effects of the ship's dark matter travel on people's emotions. Later in the book Arthur encounters another form of Fenchurch during a travel in hyperspace only to dematerialize, similar to his Fenchurch, across a plural zone into a different part of the universe.

Appears in:

- the novel The Hitchhiker's Guide to the Galaxy (unnamed cameo)
- the novel So Long, and Thanks for All the Fish
- the novel Mostly Harmless (only mentioned in passing)
- the novel And Another Thing...
- Fenchurch Everris, mentioned in Destiny 1 and 2, was likely inspired by Fenchurch.

=== Frankie and Benjy Mouse ===
Frankie and Benjy are the mice that Arthur (et al.) encounter on Magrathea. Frankie and Benjy wish to extract the final readout data from Arthur's brain to get the Ultimate Question. Frankie and Benjy are, after all, part of the pan-dimensional race that created the Earth as a supercomputer successor to Deep Thought in order to find out the question to which the answer was 42.

In the first version, the radio series, they offered Arthur and Trillian a large amount of money if they could tell them what the Question is. In later versions this was changed – unfortunately for Arthur, they claim the only way to do this is to remove his brain and prepare it, apparently by dicing it. They promise to replace it with a simple computer brain, which, suggested Zaphod, would only have to say things like "What?", "I don't understand" and "Where's the tea?". Arthur objects to this ("What?" he says. "See!" says Zaphod), and escapes with the help of his friends. Frankie says:

Well, I mean, yes idealism, yes the dignity of pure research, yes, the pursuit of truth in all its forms; but there comes a point, I'm afraid, where you begin to suspect that if there's any real truth it's that the entire multi-dimensional infinity of the Universe is almost certainly being run by a bunch of maniacs; and if it comes to a choice between spending another ten million years finding that out and on the other hand just taking the money and running, I for one could do with the exercise.

In the 2005 movie The Hitchhiker's Guide to the Galaxy, they are in fact the manifestations of Lunkwill and Fook, the pan-dimensional beings who designed and built Deep Thought, and were killed by Arthur Dent when they attempted to remove his brain.

Appear in:

- the novel The Hitchhiker's Guide to the Galaxy
- Fit the Fourth of the radio series. David Tate voiced Benjy Mouse and Peter Hawkins voiced Frankie Mouse.
- episode 4 of the TV series, where they were voiced by David Tate and Stephen Moore.

=== Frat Gadz ===
Frat Gadz wrote the handbook titled Heavily Modified Face Flannels, which is described by The Guide as "an altogether terser work for masochists" in Fit the Eighth of the radio series.

=== Frogstar Prisoner Relations Officer ===
In Fit the Eighth of the radio series the Frogstar Prisoner Relations Officer (referred to in the scripts as the "FPRO") does his best to annoy Zaphod by hosing him down, letting him think that he escaped to an Ursa Minor robot disco by body debit card, asking him for an autograph and teleporting away whilst Zaphod helps him with his respiratory problem – that he is breathing.

=== Gag Halfrunt ===
Gag Halfrunt is the private brain care specialist of Zaphod Beeblebrox and Prostetnic Vogon Jeltz. Halfrunt describes Beeblebrox as "Just this guy, you know?"

In the novel The Restaurant at the End of the Universe and Fit the Ninth of the radio series, he is responsible for the order to destroy Earth, reasoning that if the ultimate question is revealed, everybody would be happy and psychiatrists would be put out of business. When he learns of two escaped Earth people (Arthur and Trillian), he orders the Vogons to attack the Heart of Gold, at around the same time that Arthur unwittingly sabotages the ship's computers by asking them to make a cup of tea.

Halfrunt was played by Gil Morris in the TV show and by Jason Schwartzman in the 2005 movie The Hitchhiker's Guide to the Galaxy. In both these versions, he only appears briefly.

=== Gail Andrews ===
In the novel Mostly Harmless, Gail Andrews is an astrologer who is interviewed by Tricia McMillan about the impact that the discovery of the planet Persephone (or Rupert) will have on astrology. She is an advisor to the President of the United States, President Hudson, but denies having recommended the bombing of Damascus.

In the radio series, she appears in Fit the Twenty-Third of the radio series, and is voiced by Lorelei King.

=== Gargravarr ===
Gargravarr, the disembodied mind and custodian of the Total Perspective Vortex on Frogstar World B ("the most totally evil place in the galaxy"), suffers from real-life dualism and is therefore having trial separation with his body, which has taken his forename Pizpot. The dispute arose over whether sex is better than fishing or not, a disastrous attempt at combining the two activities, and his body going out partying too late.

Since he has no physical form that can be seen, he leads those condemned to the Total Perspective Vortex by humming various morose tunes so that the condemned can follow the sound of his voice.

Appears in:

- the novel The Restaurant at the End of the Universe
- Fit the Eighth of the radio series voiced by Valentine Dyall.

=== Garkbit ===
Garkbit is the Head Waiter at Milliways, the impossible "The Restaurant at the End of the Universe". He is unfazed by Arthur, Ford, Zaphod, and Trillian's unruly arrival. He has a fine sales patter and a dry sense of humour.

Appears in:

- the novel The Restaurant at the End of the Universe
- Fit the Fifth of the radio series voiced by Anthony Sharp.
- episode 5 of the TV series portrayed by Jack May.

The book describes Garkbit as being a methane breather, with a life-support system strapped discreetly to his thigh.

=== Genghis Temüjin Khan ===
Son of Yesügei, Genghis Khan is both a distant ancestor of Mr Prosser and was called "a wanker, a tosspot, a very tiny piece of turd" by Wowbagger, the Infinitely Prolonged in "The Private Life of Genghis Khan", originally based on a sketch written by Adams and Graham Chapman. The short story also appears in some editions of The Salmon of Doubt.

=== Girl with a Master's degree ===
After leaving the Old Pink Dog Bar (in the novel So Long, and Thanks for All the Fish), Ford Prefect discovers his life's work has been undeleted. He shares this discovery and some Ol' Janx Spirit with a working girl who has "a Master's degree in Social Economics and can be very convincing". Engrossed in his own writing, she leaves Ford and leaves with a client in a steel grey Han Dold limousine. Ford later overhears her saying "It's OK, honey, it's really OK, you got to learn to feel good about it. Look at the way the whole economy is structured...".

=== God ===
God, about to disappear in a puff of logic, from HitchHiker's TV series

Aside from being the favourite subject of author Oolon Colluphid (Where God Went Wrong, Some More of God's Greatest Mistakes, Who is this God Person Anyway? and Well That About Wraps it Up for God), God also makes a disappearance in the Guide's entry for the Babel Fish ("I refuse to prove that I exist," says God, "for proof denies faith, and without faith I am nothing". "But," says man, "The Babel fish is a dead giveaway, isn't it? It could not have evolved by chance. It proves you exist, and so therefore, by your own arguments, you don't. QED.").

Majikthise worries about philosophers sitting up half the night arguing that there may (or may not) be a God if Deep Thought can give His phone number the next morning. Arthur, Fenchurch and Marvin visit God's Final Message to His Creation in the novel So Long, and Thanks for All the Fish.

At least six other characters have the status of a god: Almighty Bob, the Great Green Arkleseizure, Thor, Rob McKenna, who is unknowingly a rain god, Gaia, the Greek goddess who personifies the Earth, and Cthulhu, who is one of the Great Old Ones from the Cthulhu Mythos. Gaia, Thor, and Cthulhu are among the deities interviewed by Hillman Hunter for the job of God of the Earth-refugee planet of Nano, with Thor being selected.

=== Gogrilla Mincefriend ===
An enterprising man who addressed the problem of elevators refusing to operate because they had been afforded a degree of prescience (to facilitate their operation by allowing them to be waiting for you before you've even decided you want to go up or down a floor) but consequently became terrified of the future, and protested. Mincefriend became very wealthy when he patented and successfully marketed a device he had seen in a history book: the staircase.

=== Golgafrinchans ===
The Golgafrinchans first appear in Fit the Sixth of the radio series. In the novel series, their appearances are all in the novel The Restaurant at the End of the Universe and they appear in episode 6 of the TV series. In all formats, the story is essentially the same. Following their adventures at Milliways, Arthur and Ford teleport onto an "Ark Ship" containing a number of Golgafrinchans. This particular group consists of the Wodehousian "middle class" who have common, middle-management types of occupations. They were sent away from their planet under false pretences by the (upper class) "thinkers" and (working class) "doers" of their society, who deemed them useless. They were told that the entire society had to move to a new planet, with a variety of thin excuses, and that it was necessary for them to go first to prepare the new planet for their occupation. However, it turns out that one of the middle-men was necessary for survival, and as a result, the rest of the Golgafrinchan society died off (see below). They arrive on Earth, where they become the ancestors of modern humans. At the beginning of the novel Life, The Universe, and Everything it is mentioned that many of them died out, but Arthur assumes some must have survived.

==== Agda and Mella ====
Agda and Mella are Golgafrinchan girls that Arthur and Ford hit on. On Golgafrincham, Agda used to be a junior personnel officer and Mella an art director. Agda is taller and slimmer and Mella shorter and round-faced. Mella and Arthur become a couple, as do Agda and Ford. In a way Mella is very relieved because she has been saved from a life of looking at moodily lit tubes of toothpaste. Agda dies a few weeks later from a chain of events that Ford unknowingly starts by throwing the Scrabble letter Q into a privet bush: it startles a rabbit, which runs away and is eaten by a fox, who chokes on the rabbit and dies, contaminating a stream that Agda drinks from upon which she falls ill—it is said that the only moral that one could possibly learn from these occurrences is not to throw the letter Q into a privet bush. Agda and Mella only appear in the novel.

==== Captain ====
The Captain of the Golgafrinchan Ark Fleet Ship B likes to bathe with his rubber duck (he spent practically the entire time he was captain of the B Ark and as much of his time on Earth, a total time of over three years, as has been documented in the bath) and has got a very relaxed attitude towards everything. The Captain also has a fondness for a drink called "jynnan tonnyx". His personality was based on Douglas Adams' habit of taking long baths as a method of procrastination to avoid writing.

He was voiced by David Jason in the radio series and by Frank Middlemass in the LP album adaptation. On television, he was played by Aubrey Morris.

==== Great Circling Poets of Arium ====
These rock throwing poets can be seen in the Guide graphics in episode 6 of the TV series, heard about in the radio series The Primary Phase and read about in the novel The Restaurant at the End of the Universe. They are original inhabitants of Golgafrincham, one of whose descendants inspire the stories that caused the creation of the "'B' Ark" that Arthur and Ford find themselves on. The first part of their songs tell of how five princes with four horses from the City of Vassilian travel widely in distant lands, and the latter – and longer – part of the songs is about which of them is going to walk back.

==== Hairdresser ====
One of the Golgafrinchans on the prehistoric Earth, the hairdresser was put in charge of the fire development sub-committee. They gave him a couple of sticks to rub together, but he made them into a pair of scissors in the radio series, or curling tongs in the television and book series.

He was played by Aubrey Woods in the radio series, by Stephen Greif in the LP album adaptation, and by David Rowlands on television.

==== Management consultant ====
The Golgafrinchans' management consultant tried to arrange the meetings of the colonization committee along the lines of a traditional committee structure, complete with a chair and an agenda. He was also in charge of fiscal policy, and decided to adopt the leaf as legal tender, making everyone immensely rich. In order to solve the inflation problem this caused, he planned a major deforestation campaign to revalue the leaf by burning down all the forests.

He was played by Jonathan Cecil in the radio series, by David Tate in the LP album adaptation, and by Jon Glover on television.

==== Marketing girl ====
Another Golgafrinchan on prehistoric Earth, the marketing girl assisted the hairdresser's fire development sub-committee in researching what consumers want from fire and how they relate to it and if they want it fitted nasally. She also tried to invent the wheel, but had a little difficulty deciding what colour it should be.

She was played by Beth Porter both in the radio series and on television and by Leueen Willoughby in the LP album adaptation.

==== Number One ====
Number One is the First officer in the Golgafrinchan Ark Fleet Ship B. He is not very smart, having difficulty tying up his shoelaces, but is regarded by the captain as a nice chap. His only function to appear in the series is to offer Ford and Arthur drinks.

He was voiced by Jonathan Cecil in the radio series and by David Tate in the LP album adaptation. On television, the character was renamed Number Three and played by Geoffrey Beevers.

==== Number Two ====
Number Two is a militaristic officer in the Golgafrinchan Ark Fleet Ship B. He belongs to the Golgafrinchan 3rd Regiment. He captures Arthur and Ford and interrogates them. When they land on Earth, Number Two declares a war on another, uninhabited continent, leaving an "open-ended ultimatum", blows up some trees which he claims are "potential military installations," and 'interrogates' a gazelle. He likes shouting a lot, and thinks the Captain is an idiot.

He is played by Aubrey Woods in the radio series and by Stephen Greif in the LP album adaptation. On television, the character was divided into two different characters: Number Two played by David Neville on the planet Earth, and Number One played by Matthew Scurfield on the B Ark.

==== Telephone Sanitizer ====
The Golgafrinchan telephone sanitizer is in the novel The Restaurant at the End of the Universe. By tragic coincidence, after all the telephone sanitizers were sent away with the rest of the "useless" Golgafrinchans, the rest of the society died off from an infectious disease contracted from an "unexpectedly dirty" telephone.

=== Googleplex Starthinker ===
In the scripts for Fit the Fourth of the radio series, the first programmer asks Deep Thought if it is not "a greater analyst than the Googleplex Starthinker in the Seventh Galaxy of Light and Ingenuity which can calculate the trajectory of every single dust particle throughout a five-week Aldebaran sand blizzard?", which the great computer dismisses because he has already "contemplated the very vectors of the atoms in the Big Bang itself". The Googleplex Starthinker also appears in episode 4 of the TV series and the novel The Hitchhiker's Guide to the Galaxy.

Note the much later use (but same spelling) of Googleplex for the Google corporate headquarters, another homage to the number googolplex.

=== Great Green Arkleseizure ===
The creator of the universe, according to the Jatravartid people of Viltvodle VI. Their legend has it that the universe was sneezed out of the nose of the Great Green Arkleseizure, and they thus "live in perpetual fear of the time they call 'The Coming of the Great White Handkerchief'" (their cosmology's own version of the end of the Universe).

In the film, Humma Kavula, played by John Malkovich, is a missionary of the Great Green Arkleseizure religion on Viltvodle VI, ending his sermons with a simple "Bless you".

The Jatravartid's God appears (conceptually) in the novel The Restaurant at the End of the Universe, episode 5 of the TV series, and the 2005 movie The Hitchhiker's Guide to the Galaxy.

=== Great Hyperlobic Omnicognate Neutron Wrangler ===
A great computer, which according to Deep Thought, can "talk all four legs off an Arcturian Megadonkey" (although only Deep Thought could allegedly persuade said Megadonkey to go for a walk afterwards), from Fit the Fourth of the radio series.

=== Grunthos the Flatulent ===
Grunthos the Flatulent was the poetmaster of the Azgoths of Kria, writers of the second worst poetry in the universe, just between Paula Nancy Millstone Jennings and the Vogons.

During Arthur and Ford's torture by Vogon poetry, the Guide recites a tale of how, during a reading by Grunthos of his poem "Ode to a Small Lump of Green Putty I Found in My Armpit One Midsummer Morning", "four of the audience died of internal hemorrhaging and the president of the Mid-Galactic Arts Nobbling Council survived only by gnawing one of his own legs off."

Reportedly "disappointed" by the reception of his poem, Grunthos then prepared to read his 12-book epic, My Favourite Bathtime Gurgles (or Zen and the Art of Going to the Lavatory in episode 2 of the TV series). He was prevented from doing so when his small intestine leapt up his neck and throttled his brain in a desperate bid to save civilization, killing him.

Excerpt from "Ode to a Small Lump of Green Putty I Found in My Armpit One Midsummer Morning", taken from the TV series graphics:

Putty. Putty. Putty.
Green Putty – Grutty Peen.
Grarmpitutty – Morning!
Pridsummer – Grorning Utty!
Discovery..... Oh.
Putty?..... Armpit?
Armpit..... Putty.
Not even a particularly
Nice shade of green.

Excerpt from "Zen And The Art Of Going To The Lavatory", also taken from the TV series

Relax mind
Relax body
Relax bowels
Relax.
Do not fall over.
You are a cloud.
You are raining.
Do not rain
While train
Is standing at a station.
Move with the wind.
Apologise where necessary.

Appears in:

- The Hitchhiker's Guide to the Galaxy

=== Guide Mark II ===
In the fifth novel, the Guide Mark II is used by the Vogons to help them destroy all the many Earths that appear in the novels. By using reverse temporal engineering throughout the book, the Guide Mark II – which takes on the appearance of a bird with unfiltered perception – cajoles the cast to their final destination at Club Beta on Earth to first re-meet Agrajag and then be destroyed by the Vogons.

=== Hactar ===
Flexible and imaginative, Hactar was the first computer whose individual components reflected the pattern of the whole. Hactar is assembled and programmed by the Silastic Armourfiends, who then order him to assemble an "Ultimate Weapon." Hactar, receiving no other guidance from the Armourfiends, takes the request literally and builds a supernova bomb which would connect every major sun in the universe through hyperspace, thus causing every star to go supernova. Deciding that he could find no circumstance where such a bomb would be justified, Hactar builds a small defect into it. After discovering the defect, the Armourfiends pulverize Hactar.

Rather than being destroyed, Hactar is merely crippled. He can still manipulate matter, but even a simple item takes millennia to manufacture. Over æons Hactar moves and recombines to become a dark cloud surrounding Krikkit, isolating the inhabitants. Deciding that the decision not to destroy the universe was not his to make, he uses his influence to make them build their first space ship and discover the universe; he then manipulates them into the same rage which the Armourfiends possessed, urging that they destroy all other life; Hactar has reassembled the supernova bomb, this time in working condition.

After an incredibly long and bloody galactic war, Judiciary Pag banishes Krikkit to an envelope of "Slo-Time" to be released after the rest of the universe ends. At the end of the novel Life, the Universe and Everything, after his scheme fails, Hactar slips the cricket-ball-shaped supernova bomb to Arthur Dent, who trips while trying to bowl it at Lord's Cricket Ground; he ends up flying over the pitch and is able to throw the bomb aside without setting it off, thus saving the universe.

Appears in:

- the novel Life, the Universe and Everything

He is played on radio first by Geoffrey McGivern, in a flashback for which McGivern is not credited during Fit the Seventeenth of the radio series. He is then voiced by Leslie Phillips, appearing again in Fit the Eighteenth of the radio series.

=== Haggunenon Underfleet Commander ===
The Underfleet Commander reports directly to the Haggunenon Admiral. The admiral had gone off for a quick meal at Milliways, where Ford and Zaphod attempted to steal his/her/its/their flagship. But as it had a pre-set return course, it resumed its place at the front of about a hundred thousand horribly be-weaponed black battle cruisers. But because the Haggunenons have very unstable DNA and change their shape/appearance at random and often inconvenient times, the Underfleet Commander mistakenly assumes that Zaphod and Trillian are actually the admiral.

The Underfleet Commander only appears in Fit the Sixth of the radio series, voiced by Aubrey Woods. The Haggunenons were written out of subsequent versions, as they were originally co-written with John Lloyd, although they did appear in some stage adaptations.

Haggunenons are greatly inconvenienced by their genetic instability and so have vowed to wage terrible war against all "filthy, rotten, stinking, same-lings".

A similar creature appears on the BBC TV series Red Dwarf, and the hagunemnon in the Dungeons & Dragons Epic Level Handbook.

=== Heimdall ===
Keeper of the gate into Asgard. Appears in the novel And Another Thing....

=== Hig Hurtenflurst ===
Hig Hurtenflurst "only happens to be" the risingest young executive in the Dolmansaxlil Shoe Corporation. During Fit the Eleventh of the radio series, he is on Brontitall. What he is doing there is something of a mystery, as the Shoe Event Horizon was reached long ago and the survivors of the famine have long since evolved into bird people and set up home inside a fifteen-mile high statue of Arthur Dent. His foot-warriors capture Arthur Dent and three Lintilla clones, who are threatened by Hurtenflurst to be "revoked. K-I-L-L-E-D, revoked". He then proceeds to show them a film about the activities of the Dolmansaxlil Shoe Corporation, which is interrupted by Marvin, who has cut the power in order to rescue Arthur and the Lintillas.

He appeared in Fit the Eleventh of the radio series played by Marc Smith. He has not appeared in any versions after this.

=== Hillman Hunter ===
Hillman Hunter is an Irish property developer from Earth who has been tricked by Zaphod into moving to a planet created by Magrathea. He interviews various gods, as he is keen to employ Thor to keep the society he has created on the planet devoutly controlled. He acts as a "stereotype Paddy from a bygone era" using phrases such as Bejaysus and invoking leprechauns. He is a major character in the novel And Another Thing.... He has considerable problems with the Tyromancers from an alternative reality who have also settled on the planet. Like Ford Prefect, whose name derived from the Ford Prefect automobile, Hillman Hunter's name derives from an automobile sold in the United Kingdom in the 1960s. In the radio series Hexagonal Phase, Hunter was played by Ed Byrne.

=== Hotblack Desiato ===
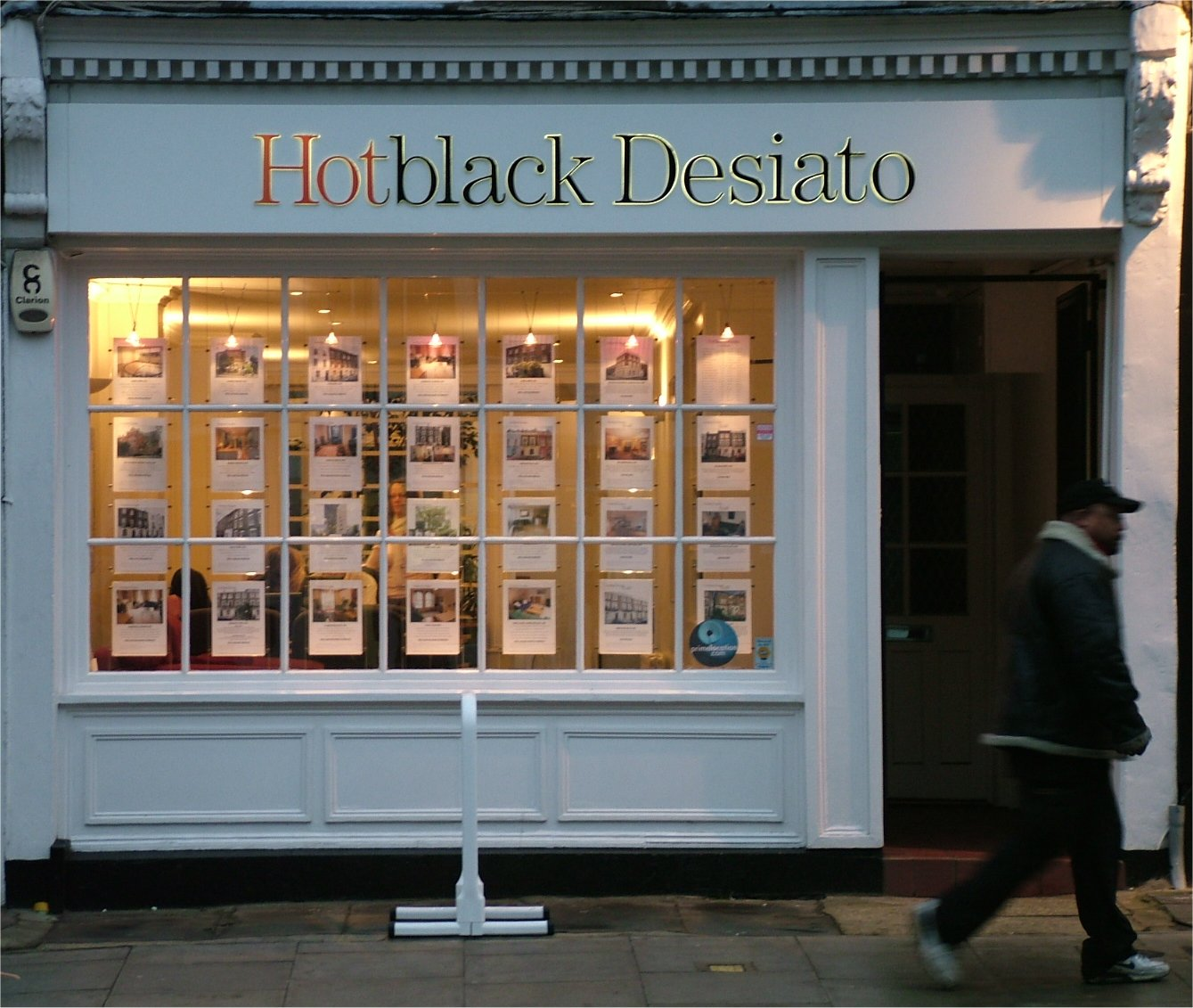
A branch of Hotblack Desiato estate agents, after which the character was named, at Camden Town

Hotblack Desiato is the guitar keyboard player of the plutonium rock group Disaster Area, claimed to be the loudest band in the universe, and in fact the loudest noise of any kind, anywhere. So loud is this band that the audience usually listens from the safe distance of 37 miles (60 km) away in a well-built concrete bunker. Disaster Area's lavish performances went so far as to crash a space ship into the sun to create a solar flare. Pink Floyd's lavish stage shows were the inspiration for Disaster Area. In the book he is described as being connected to a "death support system" and communicates only by supernatural means. At the time when the main characters meet him, in the novel The Restaurant at the End of the Universe, Hotblack is spending a year dead "for tax reasons".

The character is named after an estate agency based in Islington, with branches throughout North London. Adams said he was struggling to find a name for the character and, spotting a Hotblack Desiato sign while driving, liked the name so much he "nearly crashed the car" and eventually telephoned to ask permission to use the firm's name for a character. Apparently, the firm later received phone calls telling them they had a nerve naming their company after Adams's character.

The Disaster Area sub-plot was first heard in the LP album adaptations and later in the novel The Restaurant at the End of the Universe. It replaces the Haggunenon material from Fit the Sixth of the radio series. The character appears in episode 5 of the TV series, and his ship in episode 6 of the TV series. He does not have any lines (due to being technically dead), and is played by Barry Frank Warren.

The B-side of the 7-inch single of the Hitchhiker's Guide TV Series theme music featured a performance of a song "Only The End of the World Again", credited to Disaster Area..

The rock group actually inspired a German skate-punk band to call themselves Disaster Area.

=== Humma Kavula ===
Humma Kavula is a semi-insane missionary living amongst the Jatravartid people of Viltvodle VI, and a former space pirate. (It was presumably during his time as a pirate that he lost his lower half and had it replaced with telescoping mechanical spider appendages). He wears thick glasses, which make his eyes appear normal when worn; however, when he removes the glasses, he appears to have shrunken black pits where his eyes should be. He seems to be a religious leader on that planet, preaching about the Coming of the Great White Handkerchief (The Jatravartids' interpretation of the end of the universe, as they believe the universe was sneezed out of the nose of the Great Green Arkleseizure). Hence, his sermons end with the words "Bless You" rather than "Amen" as all the Jatravartids sneeze stimultaneously at the end of a 'prayer'.

He also ran against Zaphod Beeblebrox in the campaign for President of the Galaxy (his campaign slogan "Don't Vote For Stupid" indicated he was one of the few residents of the galaxy to not be fooled by Zaphod's incompetence) but lost, and has remained bitter about it ever since. In the film he is seeking the Point-of-View Gun to further his religion's acceptance (presumably), and he takes one of Zaphod's two heads and one of his three arms (though its removal is not shown, Zaphod says while attempting to avoid the thermonuclear missiles above Magrathea "I can't do this without my third arm") hostage to ensure his help.

While the Jatravartids were mentioned in the books, the character of Humma Kavula was created by Adams for the 2005 movie The Hitchhiker's Guide to the Galaxy. Quoting Robbie Stamp: "All the substantive new ideas in the movie, Humma, the Point of View Gun and the "paddle slapping sequence" on Vogsphere are brand new Douglas ideas written especially for the movie by him."

Appears in:

- the 2005 film The Hitchhiker's Guide to the Galaxy, played by John Malkovich.

=== Hurling Frootmig ===
Hurling Frootmig is said to be the founding editor of the Hitchhiker's Guide, who "established its fundamental principles of honesty and idealism, and went bust." Later, after much soul-searching, he re-established the Guide with its "principles of honesty and idealism and where you could stuff them both, and went on to lead the Guide to its first major commercial success."

He is mentioned in the novel Life, the Universe and Everything. He did not make the radio series The Tertiary Phase, but was mentioned in Fit the Twenty-Fourth of the radio series.

=== Judiciary Pag ===
His High Judgmental Supremacy, Judiciary Pag, L.I.V.R. (the Learned, Impartial, and Very Relaxed) was the chairman of the board of Judges at the Krikkit War Crimes Trial. He privately called himself Zipo Bibrok 5 × 10^{8} (which is five hundred million or half a billion in short-scale terminology).

It was Judiciary Pag's idea that the people of Krikkit be permanently sealed in a Slo-Time envelope, and the seal could only be broken by bringing a special Key to the Lock. When the rest of the universe had ended, the seal would be broken and Krikkit could continue a solitary existence in the universe. This judgement seemed to please everybody except the people of Krikkit themselves, but the only alternative was to face annihilation.

Pag appears to be related to Zaphod Beeblebrox; they share the same carefree and charming attitude, and Pag's real name (Zipo Bibrok 5 × 10^{8}) appears to be a mutation of Zaphod's name. (They also share the initials Z.B.) Since the Beeblebrox family lives backwards in time, Pag (despite living in the distant past) is therefore one of Zaphod's descendants.

Appears in:

- the novel Life, the Universe and Everything

He is played on radio by Rupert Degas, and appears in Fit the Fifteenth of the radio series.

=== Karl Mueller ===
Karl Mueller operates a nightclub, Club Alpha, in New York City. He is German with a Greek mother, and was handed the running of the club by his brother Stavro Mueller, who renamed Club Alpha with his own name. He appears in the novel Mostly Harmless, in the storyline regarding the final death of Agrajag.

=== Know-Nothing Bozo the Non-Wonder Dog ===
A dog belonging to advertiser Will Smithers which was so stupid that it was incapable of eating the right dog food on camera, even when engine oil was poured on the wrong food. It was so named because its hair stuck upright on its head in a way that resembled Ronald Reagan. It also had an adverse reaction whenever someone said the word "commies". Bozo barked at Arthur when he considered entering the Horse and Groom pub on his return to Earth in So Long and Thanks for all the Fish.

=== Krikkiters ===
Ford, Arthur, Trillian and Slartibartfast meet a group of murderous Krikkiters on the surface of their planet. Away from the influence of Hactar, they are troubled by their Elders wanting to destroy the Universe as they are keen to have sporting links with the rest of the Galaxy. They appear in the novel Life, the Universe and Everything and the Tertiary Phase of the radio series. They're described as being white, but that's nearly all the indication of their appearance in the book series, but the cover of the CD version of the Tertiary Phase features a drawing of the robots, one of them batting a Cricket ball. On the image, they look rather like Marvin from the 2005 movie, only with longer legs, and smaller heads, including sunglasses-like eyes and antennae, like a play on their name.

=== Kwaltz ===
Kwaltz is one of the Vogons on Vogsphere, directing Jeltz's Vogon Constructor Fleet during the demolition of Earth and enforcing the galaxy's bureaucracy. He is the partner and advisor of vice-president Questular Rontok, who seems to care more about winning Zaphod's affections than retrieving the Heart of Gold. Kwaltz also leads a team of a few hundred Vogons to capture the president's kidnapper in the penultimate scene of the movie, a chase which takes them to Magrathea, where they discover and capture Marvin the Paranoid Android (not shown), then to Earth Mark II, where they shoot up Arthur Dent's house, and are finally defeated by Marvin who gives them all a lethargic and depressed nature, at least for the moment, by use of the Point-of-view gun which works on non-organic life forms.

Appears in:

- the 2005 movie The Hitchhiker's Guide to the Galaxy, voiced by Ian McNeice.

=== Lady Cynthia Fitzmelton ===
Lady Cynthia Fitzmelton is described in the original radio script as "a sort of Margaret Thatcher, Penelope Keith character." She is responsible for christening the "very splendid and worthwhile yellow bulldozer" which knocks down Arthur Dent's house in "cruddy Cottington", and it gives her "great pleasure" to make a "very splendid and worthwhile" speech beforehand.

She only appears in Fit the First of the radio series, where she was voiced by Jo Kendall. Her "very splendid and worthwhile" lines were entirely dropped from later versions.

=== The Lajestic Vantrashell of Lob ===
The Lajestic Vantrashell of Lob is a small man with a strange hat who guards God's Final Message to His Creation, and who sells Arthur and Fenchurch a ticket to it before passing them on a scooter and imploring them to "keep to the left". Introduced by Prak in the epilogue to the novel Life, the Universe and Everything, he finally appears towards the end of the novel So Long, and Thanks for All the Fish when we also realize that he has been a regular visitor to Wonko The Sane, who describes angels with golden beards and green wings, Dr Scholl sandals, who eat nachos and do a lot of coke. He says that he runs a concession stand by the message and when Wonko says "I don't know what that means" he says "no, you don't".

=== Lallafa ===
Lallafa was an ancient poet who lived in the forests of the Long Lands of Effa. His home inspired him to write a poetic opus known as The Songs of the Long Land on pages made of dried habra leaves. His poems were discovered years after Lallafa's death, and news of them quickly spread. For centuries, the poems gave inspiration and illumination to many who would otherwise be much more unhappy, and for this they are usually considered around the Galaxy to be the greatest poetic works in existence. This is remarkable because Lallafa wrote his poems without the aid of education or correction fluid.

The latter fact attracted the attention of some correction fluid manufacturers from the Mancunian nebula. The manufacturers worked out that if they could get Lallafa to use their fluids in a variety of leafy colours in the course of his work, their companies would be as successful as the poems themselves. They therefore travelled back in time and persuaded him—in the book, by explaining the situation, with difficulty; in the radio adaptation, by beating him—to go along with their plan. The plan succeeded and Lallafa became extremely rich, but spent so much time on chat shows that he never got around to actually writing The Songs. This was solved by each week, in the past, giving Lallafa a copy of his poems, from the present, and having him write his poems again for the first time, but on the condition that he make the odd mistake and use the correction fluid.

Some argued the poems were now worthless, and set out to stop this sort of thing with the Campaign for Real Time (a play on Campaign for Real Ale), or CamTim, to keep the flow of history untampered by time travel. Slartibartfast is a member of CamTim. (The necessity for this campaign is contradicted by other events in the novels. For example, when Arthur Dent and Ford Prefect landed on primitive Earth, they decided that nothing they could do would change history. And when Agrajag diverted him to a Cathedral of Doom to try to kill him, Arthur Dent's perpetual victim said that he'd try to kill Dent even if it were a logical impossibility, Dent not having ducked a bullet yet.)

Lallafa appears in the novel Life, the Universe and Everything and Fit the Fifteenth of the radio series.

=== Lazlar Lyricon ===
A customizer of starships to the rich and famous time travellers, who first appeared in Fit the Fifth of the radio series, and later in the novel The Restaurant at the End of the Universe and episode 5 of the TV series. Ford Prefect apparently believes that "the man has no shame." His trademark is an infra-pink lizard emblem.

=== Lig Lury, Jr ===
The fourth editor of the Guide, who never actually resigned from his job. He simply left one morning for lunch and never returned to his office, making all later holders of the position "Acting Editors." His old office is still preserved by the Guide employees in the hope that he will return. His desk sports a sign that reads "Missing, presumed fed."

=== Lintilla ===
Lintilla is a woman who has (as of Fit the Eleventh of the radio series) been cloned 578,000,000,000 times due to an accident at a Brantisvogan escort agency. While creating six clones of a woman named Lintilla (at the same time another machine was creating five hundred lonely business executives, in order to keep the laws of supply and demand operating profitably), the machine got stuck in a loop and malfunctioned in such a way that it got halfway through completing each new Lintilla before it had finished the previous one. This meant that it was for a very long while impossible to turn the machine off without committing murder, despite lawyers' best efforts to argue about what murder actually was, including trying to redefine it, repronounce it, and respell it in the hope that no one would notice.

Arthur Dent encounters three of her on the planet of Brontitall, and takes a liking to (at least) one of them. He kills one of three male anti-clones, all called Allitnil (Lintilla backwards), sent by the cloning company to get her to "agree to cease to be" (although the other two of her "consummate" this legal agreement with their respective anti-clones). When Arthur leaves Zaphod, Ford, and Zarniwoop stranded with the Ruler of the Universe and his cat (at the conclusion of Fit the Twelfth of the radio series), he takes one of the Lintillas with him aboard the Heart of Gold.

All Lintillas were played by the same actress: Rula Lenska. Lintilla (and her clones) appeared only in the final three episodes of the second radio series. Rula Lenska did return to the fourth and fifth radio series – she was first an uncredited "Update Voice" for the Hitchhiker's Guide itself and then played the Voice of the Bird (the new version of the Guide introduced in the novel Mostly Harmless). Zaphod noted in the new series that the new Guide has the same voice as "those Lintilla chicks." The footnotes of the published scripts make the connection, confirming that the bird is actually an amalgam of the Lintilla clones, the solution alluded to in the second series. Lintilla and her clones (of which at the end there are now more than 800,000,000,000 – "800 thousand million") do make a re-appearance of sorts on the Heart of Gold in an alternate ending to Fit the Twenty-Sixth of the radio series (which can only be heard on CD).

The Lintillas do not appear in the novels nor in the BBC television series.

The scripts for the radio series make it clear that The Three Lintillas are "NOT an Italian High Wire Act, though I'm sure we don't actually need to mention this fact, only perhaps, well I don't know put it in anyway" (script for Fit the Twelfth of the radio series).

=== Loonquawl and Phouchg ===
See Phouchg and Loonquawl

=== The Lord ===
The Lord is a cat, owned by The Ruler of the Universe. He might like fish and might like people singing songs to him, as the Ruler of the Universe isn't certain if people come to talk to him, or sing songs to his cat or even if the cat exists at all.

Appears in:

- Fit the Twelfth of the radio series
- the novel The Restaurant at the End of the Universe

=== Lord High Sanvalvwag of Hollop ===
A man who never married. Had he done so, and forgotten his wife's birthday for the second year, he would have globbered. This definition of globber casts doubt on the usefulness of Ultra-Complete Maximegalon Dictionary of Every Language Ever. (Life, the Universe and Everything)

=== Lunkwill and Fook ===
Lunkwill and Fook are the two programmers chosen to receive Deep Thought's answer to the great question of Life, The Universe, and Everything. 7-1/2 million years after the day of the Great On-Turning.

Appear in:

- the novel The Hitchhiker's Guide to the Galaxy

On TV, Antony Carrick plays Lunkwill and Timothy Davies plays Fook, and they appear in episode 4 of the TV series.

On radio, the characters are just called First computer programmer and Second computer programmer, and appear in Fit the Fourth of the radio series, and are played by Ray Hassett and Jeremy Browne respectively.

In the 2005 movie The Hitchhiker's Guide to the Galaxy, they are merged with the characters of Frankie and Benjy Mouse. Jack Stanley plays Lunkwill and Dominique Jackson plays Fook.

=== Magician ===
Appears wandering along a beach in the novel Life, the Universe and Everything, but no one needs him.

=== Majikthise and Vroomfondel ===
Majikthise and Vroomfondel may (or may not) be philosophers. They quite definitely appear as representatives of the Amalgamated Union of Philosophers, Sages, Luminaries and other Professional Thinking Persons. When the supercomputer Deep Thought is being programmed to determine the Answer to the Ultimate Question of Life, the Universe and Everything, they declare a demarcation dispute since the search for ultimate truth is the "inalienable prerogative of your professional working thinkers". They insist on rigidly defined areas of doubt and uncertainty, and demand Deep Thought be switched off immediately. They are disarmed when Deep Thought, already committed to its seven and a half million years' calculation, suggests that a great deal of money can be made by philosophers willing to exploit the expected media interest. It is later apparent that their distant descendants revere them as "the greatest and most truly interesting pundits the universe has ever known."

Appear in:

- the novel The Hitchhiker's Guide to the Galaxy

On radio, Majikthise was played by Jonathan Adams, and Vroomfondel was played by Jim Broadbent. In the television series (but not on The Big Read), David Leland played Majikthise and Charles McKeown played Vroomfondel.

The characters were omitted from the 2005 movie The Hitchhiker's Guide to the Galaxy.

The frog Litoria majikthise was named after the character Majikthise to reference this species' "vividly coloured thighs and groin."

=== Max Quordlepleen ===
Max Quordlepleen is an entertainer who hosts at Milliways, the Restaurant at the End of the Universe and the Big Bang Burger Bar (or "Big Bang Burger Chef" in the original radio version). His feelings about the Universe outside of his onstage persona are unclear, but he has witnessed its end over five hundred times.

His name is derived from a phenomenon during a rocket's ascent.

Appears in:

- the novel The Restaurant at the End of the Universe

On radio, Roy Hudd played him. On television, it was Colin Jeavons.

He re-appears in the final episode of the radio series The Quintessential Phase, played by Roy Hudd again.

=== Mo Minetti ===
In the novel Mostly Harmless, it is Mo Minetti who had left, due to pregnancy, being the anchor the USAM TV breakfast show which Tricia McMillan is in New York to try out for. Apparently, she declined, surprisingly for reasons of taste, to deliver her child on the air.

=== Murray Bost Henson ===
Murray Bost Henson is "a journalist from one of those papers with small pages and big print" as Arthur Dent puts it. He is a friend of Arthur's whom Arthur phones one day to find out how he can get in touch with Wonko the Sane, and uses odd idioms in conversation, including such phrases as "my old silver tureen", "my old elephant tusk" and "my old prosthetic limb" (as terms of endearment) and "the Great Golden Spike in the sky" (referring to the death-place of old newspaper stories).

He is played in Fit the Twenty-First of the radio series by Stephen Fry.

=== Old Man on the Poles ===
Played by Saeed Jaffrey in Fit the Twenty-Fourth of the radio series, the old man on the poles on Hawalius, tells Arthur some old information wrapped up as news, and that everyone should have a beach house. The character appears in the novel Mostly Harmless.

=== Old Thrashbarg ===
Old Thrashbarg first appears in the novel Mostly Harmless, as a sort of priest on Lamuella, the planet on which Arthur becomes the Sandwich-Maker. He worships "Bob" and is often ignored by his villagers. Whenever he is questioned about Almighty Bob he merely describes him as "ineffable." No one on Lamuella knows what this means, because Thrashbarg owns the only dictionary, and it is "the ineffable will of Almighty Bob" that he keeps it to himself. Someone who sneaked into his house while he was out having a swim found that "ineffable" was defined in the dictionary as "unknowable, indescribable, unutterable, not to be known or spoken about".

In Fit the Twenty-Fifth and Fit the Twenty-Sixth of the radio series, Old Thrashbarg is voiced by Griff Rhys Jones.

=== Old Woman in the Cave ===
Played by Miriam Margolyes in Fit the Twenty-Fourth of the radio series, the smelly Old Woman in the Cave in the village of oracles on Hawalius provides Arthur Dent with bad olfactory stimulation and a photocopied story of her life, suggesting he live his life the opposite way so he won't end up living in a rancid cave. This occurs in the novel Mostly Harmless.

The original, real "smelly goat" event happened during the Last Chance to See radio series, found on the Douglas Adams at the BBC CD as a "Pick of the Week".

=== Oolon Colluphid ===
Oolon Colluphid is the author of several books on religious and other philosophical topics. Colluphid's works include:

- Where God Went Wrong
- Some More of God's Greatest Mistakes
- Who Is This God Person Anyway?
- Well That About Wraps It Up for God
- Everything You Ever Wanted To Know About Guilt But Were Too Ashamed To Ask (A play on the title of the sex manual written by David Reuben and the Woody Allen film it inspired)
- Everything You Never Wanted To Know About Sex But Have Been Forced To Find Out (Another play on that same title)

Colluphid is also shown as the author of the book The Origins of the Universe in the first part of the Destiny of the Daleks serial of Doctor Who. The Doctor scoffs that he "got it wrong on the first line". The reference was inserted by Douglas Adams, who was at the time working as the show's script editor.

Burkiss Way, "Eric Von Contrick" sketch excerpt
An excerpt from Douglas Adams's Burkiss Way sketch, "Eric Von Contrick" excerpt

An early version of Colluphid was the character Professor Eric Von Contrick appearing in a December 1979 episode of the BBC radio series The Burkiss Way, which was based on author Erich von Däniken. "Spaceships of the Gods", "Some more of the Spaceships of the Gods", "It Shouldn't Happen to Spaceships of the Gods", were books by the fictional author who had a Gag Halfrunt-style accent and who is visited in the Adams-written sketch by the aliens to demand a cut of Von Contrick's profits.

=== Paul Neil Milne Johnstone ===
Paul Neil Milne Johnstone of Redbridge, Essex, was the writer, according to Adams, of the worst poetry in the universe. He appeared under that name in the original radio series and the first printings of the 1979 novelization (Pan Books, paperback, page 53), and his real address was given.

The real Paul Neil Milne Johnstone (1952–2004) attended Brentwood School with Adams, and they jointly received a prize for English. At the school, Johnstone edited Broadsheet, "the Artsphere Magazine" that included mock reviews by Adams as well as Johnstone's own poetry. Johnstone won an exhibition to study at Emmanuel College, Cambridge while Adams won an exhibition to St John's College.

Johnstone achieved moderate prominence in the poetry world as an editor and festival organiser, including the 1977 Cambridge Poetry Festival. He died a few years after Adams of pancreatic failure.

After he requested the removal of his name and address, Johnstone was replaced with "Paula Nancy Millstone Jennings of Greenbridge, Essex" (a garbled form of his name). On the 1979 ORA042 vinyl record release, his name has been made indecipherable by cutting up that part of the mastertape and reassembling it in the wrong order. In the film version Paula Nancy Millstone Jennings has moved from Essex to Sussex. In the TV adaptation of the series, a portrait of Jennings was Adams with pigtails.

A sample of Jennings's poetry, taken from the animated readout in the TV series, is:

The dead swans lay in the stagnant pool.
They lay. They rotted. They turned
Around occasionally.
Bits of flesh dropped off them from
Time to time.
And sank into the pool's mire.
They also smelt a great deal.

In the TV series, Jennings is reported as living at 37 Wasp Villas, Greenbridge, Essex, GB10 1LL which is neither an actual town nor a valid postcode. The real Johnstone lived at Beehive Court in Redbridge.

=== Phouchg and Loonquawl ===
In the first novel, Phouchg and Loonquawl received Deep Thought's answer to Life, the Universe, and Everything on the day of the answer, seven and a half million years (75,000 generations) after Deep Thought had been asked the question. They were chosen at birth for this task. The name "Phouchg" may be a bastardization of the word Fuck, as his predecessor's name is Fook.

=== Poodoo ===
Poodoo is a representative of the cloning company responsible for all the Lintilla clones. He arrives on Brontitall with Varntvar The Priest on a mission to 'revoke' the three Lintillas there by marrying them to their anti-clones, each of which is named Allitnil. The marriage certificates are actually legally binding forms that make the signers agree to terminate their existence, and the unctuous Poodoo may therefore be a lawyer of some sort.

After two of the newly married couples disappear in unsmoke, Arthur shoots the third Allitnil dead and, after tying up Poodoo and Varntvar, forces them to listen to a recording of Marvin's autobiography, so as he says, "It's all over for them."

Poodoo only appears in Fit the Twelfth of the radio series, in which he is played by Ken Campbell.

=== Prak ===
In the epilogue of the novel Life, the Universe and Everything, a journalist with the Sidereal Daily Mentioner tells of Prak and then collapses into a coma.

Prak was a witness in a trial on Argabuthon where the Dwellers in the Forest were suing the Princes of the Plains and the Tribesmen of the Cold Hillsides. Prak was a messenger for Dwellers in the Forest sent to the other two parties to ask "the reason for this intolerable behaviour." He would always walk away thinking about how well-thought out the reason was, but he would always forget what it was by the time he got back. The white robots of Krikkit broke into the court room to steal the Argabuthon Sceptre of Justice, as it was part of the Wikkit Gate Key. In so doing they may have jogged a surgeon's arm, while the surgeon was injecting Prak with truth serum, resulting in too high a dose.

When the trial resumed, Prak was instructed to tell "the Truth, the Whole Truth, and Nothing but the Truth," which he did, in its entirety. People at the scene had to flee or risk insanity as Prak told every single bit of the entire truth of the entire universe and all of its history, much of which they found ghastly. Prak recalled that many of the weird bits involved frogs or Arthur Dent.

As a result, when Arthur Dent came to visit him in search of the truth, he nearly died laughing. He never did write down anything he discovered while telling the truth, first because he could not find a pencil and then because he could not be bothered. He has therefore forgotten almost all of it, but did recall the address of God's Last Message to His Creation, which he gave to Arthur when the laughter subsided. He died afterwards, not having recovered from his laughing fit.

On radio, he appears in Fit the Eighteenth of the radio series and is voiced by Chris Langham, who had played Arthur Dent in the very first stage adaptation of the scripts of the first radio series, in 1979.

=== Pralite monks ===
Pralite monks are an order that undergo extreme mental training before taking their final vows to be locked in small metal boxes for the rest of their lives; consequently, the galaxy is full of ex-Pralite monks who leave the order just before taking their final vows. Ford visited the ex-Pralite monks to Mind Surf and learned the techniques he used to charm animals on prehistoric Earth long enough for him to kill them for food and clothing.

=== President Hudson ===
Fictional former president of the US who was known to have had an affair with astrologer Gail Andrews in the novel Mostly Harmless. One of his presidential orders was the bombing of Damascus or "Damascectomy" (the taking out of Damascus), an issue Andrews denied that she counselled him on. At the time of the novel Mostly Harmless, Hudson had died for unknown reasons.

=== Princess Hooli ===
On the tri-d TV, Trillian Astra reports on the future wedding of Princess Hooli of Raui Alpha to Prince Gid of the Soofling Dynasty whilst Arthur is visiting Hawalius in the novel Mostly Harmless. The seer who is showing Arthur the future news in order to demonstrate the sudden lack of need for future tellings quickly changes the channel. Arthur says that he knows her (referring to Trillian) and tells the seer to turn the channel back. The seer, thinking that Arthur was referring to the princess, replies "Look mate, if I had to stand here saying hello to everyone who came by who knew Princess Hooli, I'd need a new set of lungs!"

=== Mr Prosser ===
Mr L. Prosser is a nervous, fat, and shabby married 40-year-old road builder who would like to build a bypass right through Arthur Dent's house. He is unaware that he is a direct but very distant descendant of Genghis Khan which causes him to have occasional visions of Mongol hordes and a preference for fur hats and axes above the door. He unfailingly addresses Arthur as "Mr Dent".

After some negotiation with Ford Prefect (or with Arthur Dent in the radio series), he is temporarily persuaded to halt the demolition. This respite does not last because the Vogons demolish Earth.

Prosser holds the distinction of having the very first line of dialogue ever in the Hitchhiker's Guide canon, as he is the first character (not counting The Guide itself) to speak in Fit the First of the radio series.

Appears in:

- the novel The Hitchhiker's Guide to the Galaxy
- the video game The Hitchhiker's Guide to the Galaxy

On radio, he was played by Bill Wallis and appears in Fit the First of the radio series. On television, he appears in episode 1 of the TV series, played by Joe Melia. He is played by Steve Pemberton in the movie version. He appears in Fit the Twenty-Sixth of the radio series, despite not appearing in the novel Mostly Harmless, voiced by Bruce Hyman; this Prosser exists on a parallel Earth where the cottage he wishes to demolish is the home of both Arthur Dent and Fenchurch.

=== Prostetnic Vogon Jeltz ===
The Vogon Captain in charge of overseeing the destruction of the Earth, Prostetnic Vogon Jeltz is sadistic, even by Vogon standards. When not shouting at or executing members of his own crew for insubordination, Jeltz enjoys torturing hitchhikers on board his ship by reading his poetry at them, then having them thrown out of an airlock into open space.

Jeltz is described as being unpleasant to look at, even for other Vogons. Given that Ford Prefect describes Vogons as having "as much sex appeal as a road accident", one can only imagine how much worse Jeltz must appear. This may explain his disposition.

It is revealed in the novel The Restaurant at the End of the Universe that Jeltz had been hired by Gag Halfrunt to destroy the Earth. Halfrunt had been acting on behalf of a consortium of psychiatrists and the Imperial Galactic Government in order to prevent the discovery of the Ultimate Question. When Halfrunt learns that Arthur Dent escaped the planet's destruction, Jeltz is dispatched to track him down and destroy him. Jeltz is unable to complete this task, due to the intervention of Zaphod Beeblebrox the Fourth, Zaphod's great-grandfather.

In the novel Mostly Harmless, Jeltz is once again responsible for the destruction of the Earth, this time presumably killing Arthur, Ford, Trillian, and Arthur's daughter, Random.

In the novel And Another Thing..., it is revealed that Jeltz did not kill Arthur, Ford, Trillian and Random. It is also revealed that he has a son called Constant Mown and that his space ship is called the Business End.

"Prostetnic Vogon" is a title, rather than part of his name, as at the beginning of the Quandary Phase he is described as belonging to the "Prostetnic class". During the second episode of the third radio series (Fit the Fourteenth), two other Prostetnic Vogons are heard from. Also, in the novel The Restaurant at the End of the Universe, Gag Halfrunt refers to Jeltz as "Captain of Vogons Prostetnic" (although this may have been a play on Halfrunt's accent). Appears in:

- the novel The Hitchhiker's Guide to the Galaxy
- the novel The Restaurant at the End of the Universe
- the novel Mostly Harmless
- the novel And Another Thing...
- the video game The Hitchhiker's Guide to the Galaxy

In the first radio series, he was played by Bill Wallis. On television, it was Martin Benson. In the third, fourth and fifth radio series, he was played by Toby Longworth, although Longworth did not receive a credit for the role during the third series. In the film, he is voiced by Richard Griffiths.

Prostetnic is a play on the word prosthetic in regard to special effects make-up. Adams was known to have a very low opinion of monsters (describing them as "cod" meaning fake looking) during his tenure as a writer for Doctor Who.

=== Questular Rontok ===
Questular Rontok is the Vice President of the Galaxy. The character did not appear in the radio or television series or any of the novels; she was introduced in the 2005 film.

Rontok is desperately in love with Zaphod Beeblebrox, the fugitive President of the Galaxy, and he knows it, as she unsuccessfully tries to hide it. Throughout the 2005 movie The Hitchhiker's Guide to the Galaxy, Questular alternately tries to arrest Zaphod for stealing the Heart of Gold (even enlisting the help of the Vogons), protects his life (when endangered by Vogon blaster fire), and at one point beseeches him to just give the stolen spaceship up. Questular appears to be the "doer", performing all the real functions of the Presidency, whilst Zaphod enjoys his status as the figurehead President. After Trillian interrogates Zaphod by repeatedly zapping him with the Point-of-view gun and he learns that she is truly in love with Arthur Dent and not him, he and Questular end up together at the end of the film, Zaphod telling her "Let's trip the light fantastic, babe." Questular is also jealous of Trillian for obvious reasons ("She's lying. She's skinny, and she's pretty, and she's lying!"), until Trillian and Zaphod part as lovers. In the early drafts of the film the character was male. In a deleted scene on the DVD, Questular expresses her love for Zaphod shortly after all the Vogons become depressed.

In the 2005 movie, she is played by Anna Chancellor.

=== Raffle ticket woman ===
In the novel So Long, and Thanks for All the Fish, Arthur Dent and Fenchurch attempt to get to know each other in a grim public house near Taunton railway station, their conversation is somewhat thwarted by a woman selling raffle tickets "for Anjie who's retiring". The numbers on both the front and back of the cloakroom ticket prove highly relevant to the protagonist. She is played in the Fit the Twentieth episode of the radio series by British comedy stalwart June Whitfield.

=== Random Dent ===
Originally prophesied by her father, Arthur Dent, after he hears a Vogon for the first time ("I wish I had a daughter so I could forbid her to marry one."), a disillusioned, teenaged Random Frequent Flyer Dent (the in-vitro progeny with Trillian Astra) is found in the novel Mostly Harmless. The line is followed up in the novel Mostly Harmless and the radio series The Quintessential Phase, the 2005 radio series adaptation of this book. The new Poe-reminiscent black bird version of the Guide manipulates her (as it has the Grebulons and Ford Prefect), so she is indirectly responsible for the destruction of all possible Earths.

Early in the novel Mostly Harmless, Arthur travels from planet to planet by donating to "DNA banks", finding that when he makes these deposits, he can travel first class. Trillian, wishing to have a child, finds some of his sperm in a DNA bank (which was very easy, since he was the only donor of the same species) and uses it to conceive Random.

Shortly before the events of the novel And Another Thing..., Random is kept in a dream sequence and frozen along with all the other main characters thanks to her telling the Guide Mark II to safeguard their lives. In her dream she is Galactic President and highly successful (having been rescued from Earth by a suspiciously girlish troop of unicorns) and marries a flaybooz (a large, guinea-pig-like creature named Fertle) to annoy her mother. When the Guide's batteries run out, she is released from her dream with all the other main characters. The events of the book then occur. Strangely, she seems affected by her dream sequence and often laments the loss of her position and her "husband". By the end of the book, Arthur proposes to go with her to find a good university for her to attend.

Appears in:

- the novel Mostly Harmless
- the novel And Another Thing...
- Quintessential Phase

In the radio series The Quintessential Phase, adapted from the novel Mostly Harmless, she is played by Samantha Béart.

=== Receptionists ===
==== New York Hotel receptionist ====
In the novel Mostly Harmless, Tricia gets garbled messages via the receptionist from Gail Andrews. Tricia interprets the message "Not happy," as meaning Gail Andrews wasn't happy with their interview.

==== Megadodo receptionist ====
Appearing in the novel The Restaurant at the End of the Universe and Fit the Seventh of the radio series the large, pink-winged, insectoid receptionist in the Megadodo offices points Zaphod using a petulant tentacle towards Zarniwoop's office, the one with a whole electronic universe in it, and is also bugged by Marvin who just wants someone to talk to. In the radio series The Quintessential Phase, he directs Zaphod towards Zarniwoop's new office, having put on the old hippy act.

=== Reg Nullify ===
Reg Nullify excerpt
An excerpt from Reg Nullify

Reg Nullify leads the "Cataclysmic Combo" band at Milliways. His band—from the novel The Restaurant at the End of the Universe—performed on the LP album/cassette re-recording of Fit the Fifth of the radio series and Fit the Sixth of the radio series, released as The Restaurant at the End of the Universe. The role was played by Graham de Wilde. In 1980 the song was also released as a track on an EP (Original Records ABO 5).

=== Rob McKenna ===
Described by the scientific community in the novel So Long, and Thanks for All the Fish as a "Quasi Supernormal Incremental Precipitation Inducer," Rob McKenna is an ordinary lorry driver who can never get away from rain and he has a log-book showing that it has rained on him every day, anywhere that he has ever been, to prove it. He has travelled to Scotland, Wales, Italy, Denmark, Yugoslavia, and Seattle in a futile effort to escape the rain. Arthur suggests that he could show the diary to someone, which Rob does, making the media deem him a 'Rain God' (something which he actually is) for the clouds want "to be near him, to love him, to cherish him and to water him". This windfall gives him a lucrative career, taking money from resorts and similar places in exchange for not going there. Rob McKenna is, in So Long, and Thanks for All the Fish, a "miserable bastard and he knew it because he'd had a lot of people point it out to him...he disliked...everyone." In the book, he is shown only twice, first when he splashes Arthur Dent, who is hitchhiking in a normal environment, on the side of a desolate road in England, for the first time on record. Second when Arthur meets him in a café, in "Thundercloud Corner," Rob McKenna's personal spot, which most people wouldn't venture near. But McKenna is mentioned throughout the book, especially when he is hailed by the media as a "Rain God," though not in those terms. In the radio show, however, he picks Arthur up instead of ignoring him, and meets him again later, after he acquired his fame. He then has a much more positive attitude towards Life, the Universe, and Everything, and is thrilled to meet Arthur again. He explains, as the narrator does in the book, that "Quasi Supernormal Incremental Precipitation Inducer" means, in layman's terms, a Rain God, but the media couldn't call him simply that, because it would suggest that the ordinary people knew something they didn't.

He appears in Fit the Nineteenth of the radio series, Fit the Twentieth of the radio series and Fit the Twenty-First of the radio series and is played by Bill Paterson, who also played one of the Arcturan Megafreighter crew in Fit the Seventh of the radio series.

Rob McKenna is assumed to be English because that is where he is mainly driving round, trying to escape the elements, and where, thanks to the summer resorts who've heard of him, he will be confined until his death in the Quintessential Phase; however, in the Quandary Phase, he has a Scottish-sounding voice.

=== Roosta ===
Roosta is a hitchhiker and researcher for the Guide, whom Ford Prefect knows at least in passing and holds in some regard (Ford describes him as "a frood who really knows where his towel is"). He carries a special towel infused with nutrients, wheat germ, barbecue sauce, and antidepressants, which can be obtained by sucking on different areas. The last two of these, he explains, are for use when the taste of the first two sickens or depresses him. He saves Zaphod Beeblebrox from a horrible death in the offices of the Guide (by taking him into the artificial universe in Zarniwoop's office), and is then kidnapped along with Zaphod and the left-hand tower of the Guide building by a squadron of Frogstar Fighters. In the radio series, he serves no other purpose than to provide conversation (and deliver the line "here Zaphod, suck this!") while the pair are travelling to the Frogstar. However, in the books, he instructs Zaphod to leave the office through the window instead of the door after the building lands. This allows Zaphod to remain in Zarniwoop's universe and survive the Total Perspective Vortex.

In the novel The Restaurant at the End of the Universe, Roosta is a much more officious, standoffish and antagonistic character than he appears in the radio series.

Appears in:

- Fit the Seventh of the radio series and Fit the Eighth of the radio series.
- the novel The Restaurant at the End of the Universe

On radio, he was voiced by Alan Ford.

=== The Ruler of the Universe ===
The Ruler of the Universe is a man living in a small shack on a world that can only be reached with a key to an improbability field or use of an Infinite Improbability Drive. He does not want to rule the universe and tries not to whenever possible, and therefore is the ideal candidate for the job. He has an odd, solipsistic view of reality: he lives alone with his cat, which he has named 'The Lord' even though he is not certain of its existence. He has a very dim view of the past, and he only believes in what he senses with his eyes and ears (and doesn't seem too certain of that, either): anything else is hearsay, so when executive-types visit to ask him what he thinks about certain matters, such as wars and the like, he tells them how he feels without considering consequences. As part of his refusal to accept that anything is true, or simply as another oddity, "He talked to his table for a week to see how it would react." He does sometimes admit that some things may be more likely than others – e.g., that he might like a glass of whisky, which the visitors leave for him.

In the radio adaptation of the novel Mostly Harmless, Ford also meets Zaphod in the accounting department of the new Guide offices. Zaphod describes being bored by a man in a shack and his cat for over a year.

Appears in:

- Fit the Twelfth of the radio series
- the novel The Restaurant at the End of the Universe

Referenced in:

- the radio series The Quintessential Phase

He was voiced on radio by Stephen Moore (in the original Radio Times listing he was announced as being played by Ron Hate – an anagram of "A.N. Other" or possibly "No Earth" – because the show was so far behind schedule that the role had not been cast when the magazine went to print).

=== Russell ===
Russell is Fenchurch's burly, blonde-moustached, blow-dried brother. He picks up Arthur Dent in his car after Arthur arrives on Earth at the beginning of the novel So Long, and Thanks for All the Fish. Arthur and Russell take an instant dislike to each other. This is also the first time Arthur meets Fenchurch, his lover and co-flyer to be – albeit she is asleep or in a comatose/fugue state and only utters one word – "This" – then lapses back into wherever she is. Fenchurch also doesn't like Russell – he calls her "Fenny" which she dislikes intensely. He also tries to simplify her problems so he can explain and understand them better (for example, he tells Arthur that Fenchurch believes herself to be a hedgehog).

He first appeared in the novel So Long, and Thanks for All the Fish, and when this was adapted to radio appears in Fit the Nineteenth of the radio series, where he is played by Rupert Degas.

=== Safety and Civil Reassurance Administration Officials ===
In the story "Young Zaphod Plays it Safe", a young Zaphod visits the wreck of the Starship Billion Year Bunker that has crashed on the planet with the best lobsters in the Western Galaxy. He is accompanied by two Officials from the Safety and Civil Reassurance Administration and an empty spacesuit, as they search for aorist rods and a Sirius Cybernetics Corporation Designer Person (babbling gently about a shining city on a hill) who it turns out has escaped to Earth. The Officials declare the planet ZZ9 Plural Z Alpha (Earth) must be made "perfectly safe".

=== Sheila Steafel ===
Whilst asleep in a cave on prehistoric Earth, Arthur Dent dreams of visiting comedian Sheila Steafel on the radio show Steafel Plus on 4 August 1982. Arthur, in his dressing gown, talks of missing Mars bars, various types of tea, Radio 4's News Quiz, chat shows, The Archers and Just a Minute. "There is nothing quite like Kenneth Williams in the entire galaxy, I've looked!" Space, he says, is "staggering, bewilderingly dull": there is so much of it and so little in it, "it sometimes reminds me of The Observer".

Adams wrote this segment specifically for Steafel's show, and Simon Jones appeared in character as Arthur Dent. Steafel can be regarded as a canonical Hitchhiker's character.

=== Shooty and Bang Bang ===
Shooty and Bang Bang are Blagulon galactic policemen. They pursue Zaphod Beeblebrox to the planet of Magrathea, whereupon they proceed to shoot at him. In the radio and television series, this results in a hyperspatial field generator exploding and throwing Arthur Dent, Ford Prefect and Zaphod forwards in time to the Restaurant at the End of the Universe. In the books, Arthur, Ford and Zaphod are saved from certain death when Marvin talks to the cops' spaceship, which becomes so depressed it commits suicide, disabling the cops' life support units and rendering them unable to breathe as they were described as being "methane breathers." They claim to be well balanced and caring, while gratuitously shooting everything in sight. Shooty writes novels (in crayon), and Bang Bang agonizes for hours to his girlfriend about gratuitously shooting everything in sight.

Bang Bang was played on radio by Ray Hassett and on television by Marc Smith. Shooty was played on radio by Jim Broadbent and on television by Matt Zimmerman.

In the Illustrated Guide to the Galaxy, the pair are played by Douglas Adams and Ed Victor (his literary agent).

The characters are never named in dialogue or in the novels, but are named in the original radio series scripts. The script notes describe how the pair were written as a parody of American cop show characters, particularly Starsky and Hutch.

=== Six Men ===
In their six starships, the Six Men are the only people who have, as far as anyone is aware, the key to the improbability field that locks away The Ruler of the Universe. This occurs in Fit the Twelfth of the radio series and the novel The Restaurant at the End of the Universe.

=== Sperm Whale ===
BBC Radiophonic Workshop, "SoundHouse", Whale Theme excerpt
An excerpt from Whale Theme from the TV series (music only), BBC Radiophonic Workshop

A sperm whale called into existence by the Heart of Gold's improbability drive, above the planet Magrathea alongside Agrajag (as a bowl of petunias), in place of two thermonuclear missiles that were targeting the ship prior. The whale has an existential life of discovery which lasts a minute before it hits the ground, leaving a large crater and whale remains. It appears in the novel The Hitchhiker's Guide to the Galaxy, episode 3 of the TV series, the movie, and Fit the Third of the radio series. Voiced by Stephen Moore in the radio and TV series, and by Bill Bailey in the feature film.

=== Stavro Mueller ===
Ran Club Alpha in New York, visited by Tricia McMillan in the novel Mostly Harmless. Stavro opens a second club in the novel Mostly Harmless called Club Beta, which is where Arthur Dent narrowly escapes death from a blaster shot by his daughter Random Dent and the shot hits Agrajag who proclaims that Arthur keeps killing him in Life, the Universe and Everything. We are told that he was a Greek with a German father and has handed Club Alpha over to his brother Karl Mueller so Stavro can open a new club in London. In the radio series The Quintessential Phase Stavro is an only child.

=== Strinder the Tool Maker ===
As Arthur is regarded as The Sandwichmaker from Bob on the remote iron-age planet of Lamuella, Strinder makes knives to cut the Perfectly Normal Beast for his sarnies. From the novel Mostly Harmless and the radio series The Quintessential Phase.

=== Sulijoo ===
Another friend of Disaster Area's Hotblack Desiato, who Ford says agreed with him that Disaster Area was going to make Hotblack a star. Appears in the novel The Restaurant at the End of the Universe.

=== Thor ===
Thor, a figure from Norse mythology, appears at Milliways, and is mentioned in Fit the Fifth of the radio series, episode 5 of the TV series, and the novel The Restaurant at the End of the Universe.

He next appears in the novel Life, the Universe and Everything, at a party, where he is chatting up Trillian. Arthur tricks him into stepping out of the (flying) building by challenging him to a fight. In the radio adaptation of this he appears in Fit the Sixteenth of the radio series, where he is played by Dominic Hawksley. Hawksley reprises the role in the radio adaptation of the novel Mostly Harmless, the radio series The Quintessential Phase, despite not appearing in that book. Two other characters from the Restaurant – Max Quordlepleen and Zarquon – also appear.

Thor is a major character in the novel And Another Thing..., where he fights Wowbagger and protects the humans from Zaphod's dodgy weapons.

Thor also appears in the Dirk Gently novel and radio series The Long Dark Tea-Time of the Soul.

=== Tribesmen of the Cold Hillsides ===
These tribesmen fought with (in the epilogue of the novel Life, the Universe and Everything) the Princes of the Plains in the land of the Dwellers in the Forest, to the detriment of the latter, for a really good reason, but Prak cannot remember why.

=== Trin Tragula ===
Trin Tragula was a speculative philosopher who invented the Total Perspective Vortex basically in order to annoy his wife. His wife thought he was an idiot who needed to "have some sense of proportion", exhorting her view frequently. When he attached his wife to the Total Perspective Vortex, the shock of seeing herself in relation to the rest of the universe instantly annihilated her brain. Although he was horrified by this, Trin Tragula found some satisfaction in discovering that the one thing that a person cannot afford to have in a universe this size is a sense of proportion.

=== Varntvar The Priest ===
He has only four lines in the programme, accompanying Poodoo and the Allitnils in the conspiracy to destroy Lintilla's clones. Varntvar is eventually forced to listen to a tape of Marvin's autobiography.

He appears only in Fit the Twelfth of the radio series, in which he is played by Geoffrey McGivern.

=== Veet Voojagig ===
Veet Voojagig is described as "a quiet, young student at the University of Maximegalon", who initially studied ancient philology, transformational ethics and the Wave Harmonic Theory of Historical Perception. Then, after drinking some Pan Galactic Gargle Blasters with Zaphod Beeblebrox, he became obsessed with the problem of what happens to all the biros he'd bought over the years which had somehow disappeared. Voojagig claimed to have discovered the solution that they disappear to a world of their own, and claimed further to have worked on that world, working for a family of cheap green retractables. The character was described as ending up in "tax exile" – and may have had a hand in "Zaphod Beeblebrox's highly profitable second-hand [pen] business." Also of note that when others visited the planet where Veet Voojagig claimed to have lived, all they found was a small asteroid inhabited by "a strange old man who repeatedly claimed that nothing was true, though he was later found to be lying."

Veet Voojagig appears in the novel The Hitchhiker's Guide to the Galaxy and is mentioned in Fit the Third of the radio series.

=== Vroomfondel and Majikthise ===
See Majikthise and Vroomfondel

=== War Command Krikkiters ===
Zaphod overheard the two War Command Krikkiters in the Robot War Zones, discussing the lassitude of the Krikkit War Robots, saying The war, sir, it seems to be getting them down. They just seem to get a little tired and a little grim ... and then they sulk. In (the novel Life, the Universe and Everything).

=== Will Smithers ===
Owner of a grey Porsche 928S (which Rob McKenna has been blocking for 20 miles) with a sticker that reads "My other car is also a Porsche", Will soaks Arthur Dent (and fails to give him a lift) when he is hitchhiking back on Earth at the beginning of the novel So Long, and Thanks for All the Fish. Will works in advertising and drinks in Arthur's local pub, the Horse and Groom and is owner of Know-Nothing Bozo the Non-Wonder Dog.

=== The Wise Old Bird ===
The Wise Old Bird is the leader of the Bird People of Brontitall. He does not like saying the word "shoe", as he and the bird people consider it unspeakable. The Bird People live in the right ear of a fifteen-mile-high statue of Arthur Dent, constructed by their ancestors.

The "wise old bird" is a phrase which features in the nursery rhyme A Wise Old Owl

A wise old owl lived in an oak;
The more he saw the less he spoke;
The less he spoke the more he heard.
Why can't we all be like that wise old bird?

The Wise Old Bird appeared in Fit the Tenth of the radio series. He was voiced by John Le Mesurier who was originally intended to play the character of Slartibartfast.

=== Werdle Sneng ===
Werdle Sneng, in Fit the Eighth of the radio series, has a book out, Bath Sheets in Space which is found adorning contemporary hot beverage tables, as it is far too large for anyone's pocket, fashionable or otherwise.

=== Wonko the Sane ===
Wonko's Toothpicks

John Watson aka Wonko the Sane lives in coastal California with his wife, Arcane Jill Watson, in a house called The Outside of the Asylum (which features interior features on its outside and exterior on its inside). When Wonko saw instructions on how to use a toothpick on a packet of toothpicks, he became convinced that the world had gone crazy and so built the house as an asylum for it, hence the reversal of the interior and exterior. Arthur and Fenchurch pay Wonko a visit and learn that like both of them, he had also received a fishbowl from the dolphins (having been a marine biologist and close to them). He also claims to have seen angels with golden beards, green wings and Dr Scholl sandals, who drive little scooters, do a lot of coke and are very wonderful about a whole range of things. Arthur and Fenchurch discover the truth behind this after they have seen God's Last Message to His Creation.

John Watson appears in the novel So Long, and Thanks for All the Fish. In the radio series, he is played by Christian Slater.

=== Wowbagger, the Infinitely Prolonged ===
In contrast to most other immortals, Bowerick Wowbagger was not born one, but became immortal due to an accident with "an irrational particle accelerator, a liquid lunch, and a pair of rubber bands", an event which no-one has been able to replicate without ending up looking rather silly or dead (or both). Unlike other immortals, whom he calls "a load of serene bastards", he doesn't cope very well with his infinite life, having not been born into it and thus lacking the innate ability to handle it. Finding something to do on Sunday afternoons causes him particular difficulties. Eventually he comes up with a plan to keep himself busy: he will insult every single living being in the universe – in alphabetical order. He appears in the novel Life, the Universe and Everything, while insulting Arthur Dent with the phrase, "You're a jerk, a complete arsehole" (in the US changed to "...complete kneebiter"). Later, after Arthur escapes prehistoric Earth, Wowbagger shows up again in the present, but when he sees Arthur he says, "I've done you before, haven't I?" After Arthur, his next planned victim is A-Rth-Urp-Hil-Ipdenu, a slug he intends to call "a brainless prat." In the novel Life, the Universe and Everything, one Arthur Philip Deodat is also a victim of Wowbagger, during the Krikkit Robot attack on Lord's Cricket Ground.

Wowbagger makes a return in the novel And Another Thing... in his ship, the Tanngrisnir where he falls in love with Trillian, fights with Thor (during which he loses his immortality, but survives) and calls Zaphod "a fat arse".

Wowbagger is also present in "The Private Life of Genghis Khan", where he insults Genghis Khan, so that he "stormed into Europe in such a rage that he almost forgot to burn down Asia before he left."

In the new radio series, he is voiced by Toby Longworth. In the radio series The Quintessential Phase, he finally reaches the end of his quest by insulting the Great Prophet Zarquon, who revokes Wowbagger's immortality.

Appears in:

- the novel Life, the Universe and Everything
- the novel And Another Thing...
- the short story "The Private Life of Genghis Khan", published in The Utterly Utterly Merry Comic Relief Christmas Book

Cultural reference:

- Wowbagger the Infinitely Prolonged was the inspiration for an insult generation program of the same name, originally available on Atari ST computers and later rewritten for Windows-based systems. Since early 2013 its support site has also incorporated the insult functionality, at which moment the software got a "no longer supported" status.

=== Yooden Vranx ===
Yooden Vranx is the late former President of the Galaxy, the direct predecessor to Zaphod Beeblebrox. Just before his death, Yooden came to see Zaphod and presented his idea to steal the Heart of Gold. Following Yooden's suggestion, Zaphod locked out a section in each of his own brains so that no one could figure out why he ran for the presidency.

Zaphod and Ford Prefect's first encounter with Yooden occurred when they were children on Betelgeuse and Yooden was a ship's captain. Zaphod had bet Ford that he could raid a heavily fortified Arcturan megafreighter and took Ford along for the attempt, using a souped-up trijet scooter. They boarded the ship (captained by Yooden), stormed the bridge with toy pistols, and demanded conkers. Yooden gave them conkers, food, booze, and various other items before teleporting them to the maximum-security wing of the Betelgeuse state prison.

=== Zaphod Beeblebrox the Fourth ===
Zaphod Beeblebrox's father's name was Zaphod Beeblebrox the Second, and Zaphod's grandfather was called Zaphod Beeblebrox the Third. This was due to an "accident with a contraceptive and a time machine".

The great-grandfather of Zaphod Beeblebrox, Zaphod Beeblebrox the Fourth is one of two active characters in books who are dead (see also: Hotblack Desiato). When Arthur Dent inadvertently freezes the systems on board Heart of Gold at the same moment Prostetnic Vogon Jeltz attacks, the younger Zaphod holds a séance to contact Zaphod the Fourth.

Zaphod the Fourth berates his great-grandchild for being self-absorbed and learns of the ship's imminent destruction. He stops time so he can continue deriding Zaphod, who tries (rather weakly) to defend his life. Zaphod the Fourth saves the ship and crew to keep his great-grandchild and his "modern friends" from joining him in the afterlife and thereby ruining the experience.

When he learns that the ship had seized up to solve the dilemma of either making tea (in the novel The Restaurant at the End of the Universe) or figuring out why Arthur would want dried leaves in water (Fit the Ninth of the radio series), he solves these problems before leaving by either leaving a pot of tea in the Nutri-Matic Drink Synthesizer or by explaining to Eddie that "he's an ignorant monkey who doesn't know better", respectively. In the book Z.B. the Fourth approves of the tying up of all computer resources to make tea – unlike everyone else present on the Heart of Gold at the time, including Arthur who originally made the request of Eddie.

As a final note, Zaphod explains that his great-grandfather is "the Fourth" due to an accident with a contraceptive and a time machine. Zaphod the Fourth, therefore, refers to his great-grandson as "Zaphod Beeblebrox the Nothingth" (Zaphod tries to counter this by referring to himself as "the First").

Appears in:

- Fit the Ninth of the radio series
- the novel The Restaurant at the End of the Universe

He was voiced on radio by Richard Goolden.

=== Zarniwoop (Vann Harl) ===
Zarniwoop Vann Harl works in the offices of the Guide, on Ursa Minor Beta. He appears in Fit the Eleventh of the radio series, the novel The Restaurant at the End of the Universe, the novel Life, the Universe and Everything, and the radio series The Quintessential Phase.

When Zaphod travels to Ursa Minor Beta to meet him, he is informed that Zarniwoop is unavailable, and too cool, to see him right now. He is in his office, but he's on an intergalactic cruise. Zaphod subsequently discovers that Zarniwoop's intergalactic cruise ship has spent 900 years on Brontitall (in Fit the Eleventh of the radio series), or Frogstar B (in the novel The Restaurant at the End of the Universe), waiting for delivery of a complement of small lemon-soaked paper napkins, and every single passenger has aged considerably despite enforced hibernation. Only one person has not aged: Zarniwoop, who was not a passenger, but who hid himself on the spaceship. Zaphod subsequently learns that before he sealed part of his own brain, he was collaborating with Zarniwoop to find out who rules the universe – this being Zarniwoop's obsession. In the books, Zarniwoop is marooned on The Ruler of the Universe's planet by Zaphod et al. and is stuck outside the only shelter for weeks in driving rain, because The Ruler is unsure as to whether Zarniwoop's desperate thumping on the door is real or not. At the end of the second radio series, he is similarly marooned, but this time by Arthur, with Ford Prefect and Zaphod Beeblebrox for company.

In the Quintessential Phase radio series, Zarniwoop is revealed to be the same person as the novel Mostly Harmless character Vann Harl (Zarniwoop is his first name), and a Vogon in disguise. He has escaped being left on the desolate planet and is masterminding the Guide's new all-powerful format.

On the radio, Zarniwoop Vann Harl is voiced by Jonathan Pryce. His casting was accidental – he had been hired to play a different role (The Ruler of the Universe) whose lines had apparently not been written in time. However, he was happy to return for the final series, at which point a lot more was revealed about his character – much of it appropriately sinister, since Pryce had then become well known for playing villains.

=== Zarquon ===
Zarquon is a legendary prophet. He is worshipped by a small group visiting The Restaurant at the End of the Universe, and is old, bearded, robed, wreathed in light, has starry eyes and a crown of gold. His name is frequently invoked as a curse, such as "Holy Zarquon's singing fish" and "for Zark's sake".

It is only on the visit to Milliways that Zarquon does indeed appear – his overdue second coming – moments before the Universe ends (His last words are "How are we doing for time?"). The host Max claims that he had done the show "over five hundred times" and "nothing like this had ever happened before".

He appears in Fit the Fifth of the radio series, voiced by Anthony Sharp, in the book the novel The Restaurant at the End of the Universe and in episode 5 of the TV series is played by Colin Bennett.

He has a final brief cameo in the radio series The Quintessential Phase played by William Franklyn.

=== Zem ===
Zem is an affable, yet stupid, swamp-dwelling mattress. The pocket-sprung lifeform flollops, willomies and glurries around Sqornshellous Zeta and tries his best to cheer up Marvin the Paranoid Android, who became stranded on the planet after having one arm welded to his side and one leg replaced by a steel pillar. Because of his limited intellect he has the same conversation with Marvin every day until the android leaves. After attempting to make conversation about the weather (Marvin: "The dew has fallen with a particularly sickening thud this morning... if I had teeth I would grit them at this point"), Marvin's life story, and the (formerly thriving) economy of Sqornshellous itself, Zem offers that Marvin should be more mattresslike in his outlook. Zem is the sole witness to Marvin's abduction by the Krikkit war robots.

Note: "Zem" is the name of all Sqornshellous Zeta mattresses; as Zem himself puts it, "Some of us are killed, [i.e. taken away to be dried and slept on] but all of us are called Zem, so we never know which and globbering is thus kept to a minimum." He appears in the novel Life, the Universe and Everything.

On radio, he is voiced by Andy Taylor.

== See also ==
- Phrases from The Hitchhiker's Guide to the Galaxy
- The Hitchhiker's Guide to the Galaxy cast lists
