= And Another Thing... (novel) =

Eoin Colfer novel

- Author: Eoin Colfer
- Language: English
- Series: The Hitchhiker's Guide to the Galaxy
- Genre: Comic science fiction
- Publisher: Penguin Books, Hyperion Books
- Publication date: 12 October 2009
- Publication place: United Kingdom; United States
- ISBN: 978-1-4013-2358-5
- Preceded by: Mostly Harmless

And Another Thing... is the sixth and final installment of Douglas Adams' The Hitchhiker's Guide to the Galaxy "trilogy of six books". The book, written by Eoin Colfer, was published on the thirtieth anniversary of the first book, 12 October 2009, in hardback. It was published by Penguin Books in the UK and by Hyperion Books in the US. Colfer was commissioned to write the book by Adams' widow Jane Belson.

== Background ==
After writing five Hitchhiker books, Adams had felt the need to continue the story: "I suspect at some point in the future I will write a sixth Hitchhiker book...", and "People have said, quite rightly, that Mostly Harmless is a very bleak book. I would love to finish Hitchhiker on a slightly more upbeat note, so five seems to be a wrong kind of number; six is a better kind of number."

In referring to the Dirk Gently book he was then working on, Adams said, "A lot of the stuff which was originally in The Salmon of Doubt really wasn't working." Adams had planned on "salvaging some of the ideas that I couldn't make work in a Dirk Gently framework and putting them in a Hitchhiker framework... and for old time's sake I may call it The Salmon of Doubt." However, Adams died in 2001 without having written the sixth book.

Unlike the previous Hitchhiker's sequels, the title is not a quotation from the first novel, but taken from the third chapter of So Long, and Thanks for All the Fish, where it appears in the following passage:

The storm had now definitely abated, and what thunder there was now grumbled over more distant hills, like a man saying 'And another thing...' twenty minutes after admitting he's lost the argument.

== Plot summary ==
And Another Thing... starts where Mostly Harmless ends, with Arthur Dent, Ford Prefect, Trillian, and Arthur and Trillian's daughter Random standing inside Club Beta, while the Earth is about to be destroyed by the Vogons.

Prostetnic Vogon Jeltz, assigned to destroy all humans, hears rumours of a colony of Earthmen, and he sets off in the warship Business End to destroy them, while Arthur attempts to get Wowbagger to stop the Vogons.

On the Earth colony Nano, the stereotypical Irish leader Hillman Hunter is seeking applicants to be the planet's god, who would keep Hillman in charge due to divine providence. Meanwhile, Prostetnic Jeltz's son, Constant Mown, is having rather "un-Vogonly" thoughts, including an enjoyment of poetry and sympathy for humans. Wowbagger and Random start arguing, and Wowbagger drugs and imprisons Random. Afterwards, Trillian and Wowbagger fight, but they share a kiss at the end of the argument. Random is less than impressed with her mother's and Wowbagger's actions, and complains about it to Ford. Random steals Ford's company credit card.

Back on Asgard, Zaphod has managed to gain access to Valhalla and finds his old acquaintance, Thor. After some negotiations, Thor agrees to help Zaphod by becoming Nano's god and killing Wowbagger.

Things on Nano are not going as planned, and Hillman is struggling to find his god and keep order among his own populace, as well as trying to control the Magratheans who built the planet. Hillman recalls creating a cult for the rich, which preached of a coming apocalypse, only for the Grebulons to create such an apocalypse. Having received an offer from Zaphod, Hillman and his followers relocated to their "haven", the planet Nano. However, many of the staff abandoned their rich employers and several rival religious groups also settled on the planet, the most prominent of these being the cheese-worshiping Tyromancers, led by Aseed. The Tyromancers and the Nanites enter into a war, and during one of the war's battles, the Heart of Gold and Thor suddenly arrive.

Wowbagger's ship lands on Nano and is met by the Tyromancers. Zaphod negotiates for Thor to be Nano's god and reveals that Aseed and Hillman are actually the same being from parallel universes, both of whom made deals with Zaphod. It is revealed that this is what brought him to Earth, saving Arthur and the rest. With Wowbagger representing the Tyromancers for show and Thor representing the Nanites, the two meet in battle.

The battle begins, but Thor is unable to win because Wowbagger does not die, even when hit with the hammer Mjöllnir. A package for Random arrives through interstellar freight, containing the rubber bands involved in Wowbagger's becoming immortal, which Random believes may be able to hurt him. Using Mjöllnir, enhanced with the rubber bands, Thor sends Wowbagger into the air.

The Vogons approach with the intent of destroying Nano. Thor is able to deflect the Vogon missiles, but is seemingly killed by an experimental weapon called QUEST. Constant Mown disables the Vogon gunner, and uses the argument that their orders are to kill Earthlings and not Nanites (legally two distinct groups, with the latter being taxpaying citizens). Prostetnic Jeltz agrees to his argument, and is proud of his son's ability to follow law and bureaucracy. Zaphod and Hillman tell the people that Thor is Nano's martyr and that all commands he will issue shall henceforth come from Hillman, only for Hillman to be sliced in two by a piece of bomb debris.

Luckily, Hillman's death is short, as the Heart of Gold medical bay restores him to full health, with only one minor change – he now has hooves rather than feet. Even though he now has control over the populace, he grows displeased upon finding himself swamped with civic paperwork. Zaphod sets off with Left Brain to work on his re-election campaign, and Ford has decided to stay behind and sample the best Nano has to offer, so he can write material for the Guide. Up in space, a very much alive Thor is pleased to learn of his rise back to fame, and the success of his "martyrdom" trick. Arthur finds the beach from his construct. To his displeasure, he finds that Vogons are going to destroy it.

== Announcement ==
The announcement of And Another Thing… was made on 16 September 2008. Although Colfer spoke of "semi-outrage" at the initial idea of another author contributing to the series, he came to regard the book as "a wonderful opportunity to work with characters I have loved since childhood and give them something of my own voice while holding on to the spirit of Douglas Adams". Adams' widow, Jane Belson, said that she "could not think of a better person to transport Arthur, Zaphod and Marvin to pastures new" and gave the project her full support.

When the announcement was made on the BBC Radio 4's news show The Today Programme, a special sketch starring Simon Jones as Arthur Dent (whom he played in the radio and television series) was broadcast. In it, Arthur was angry at the news that he had been "brought back from the dead".

A reception was held at the Penguin offices in London on 9 March 2009 to launch the cover of the book and announce the related marketing activity which included the BBC, with their CDs of the radio series, and Pan with their reissues of the first five books of the series. As part of the book's promotion, a website collected Twitter-style messages from visitors, to be "transmitted into deep space" on the day of the book's launch.

Waterstones' science-fiction buyer Michael Rowley described the match of Colfer and Hitchhiker's as "an inspired combination", although some Hitchhiker's fans expressed regret that "a complete unique series can't remain untouched" and hoped Colfer would not "completely ruin the books".

== Radio adaptation ==
And Another Thing... was adapted and abridged for BBC Radio 4's Book at Bedtime, in ten parts, broadcast from 12–23 October 2009. It was abridged by Penny Leicester, read by Stephen Mangan, with Peter Serafinowicz as the voice of The Guide, and produced by Heather Larmour. The parts are about half the size of a regular "fit" of the more formal radio adaptations of the other books, totalling about five fits in comparison, but each part has its own short title.

A full cast radio adaptation under the title The Hitchhiker's Guide to the Galaxy: The Hexagonal Phase and adapted from And Another Thing... , with unpublished Hitchhiker material by Douglas Adams, was announced in October 2017 by the BBC as the sixth series of Hitchhiker's Guide. The first episode of the series was broadcast on 8 March 2018 - the 40th anniversary of the original first episode in 1978 - and the complete series was released commercially both on CD and via audio download by Audible.com on 19 April 2018.

== Audio book ==
The audio book version is read by Simon Jones, who played Arthur Dent in the radio and television series as well as a short made by BBC Radio 4 to celebrate the original announcement of the book. The recording is ten hours and twenty one minutes in length and is the first Hitchhikers audio book starring Jones. The others were read by Stephen Moore (known for playing Marvin in the radio series and television series, and did recordings for all books except Mostly Harmless), Douglas Adams, Martin Freeman (who had played Arthur in the 2005 film) and Stephen Fry (known for being the voice of The Guide in the 2005 film, the voice of Murray Bost Henson in The Quandary Phase of the radio series, and a close friend of Adams).

== Reception ==
The book received mixed reviews from both readers and critics. Reviewing the book in The Guardian, Mark Lawson described Colfer's writing as "the best post-mortem impersonation I have ever read" and considered the book "a perfectly calculated adaptation". Curtis Silver of Wired also praised the book as a continuation of Adams' story that only suffered slightly from some jokes being too clichéd. Other positive reviews came from The Times, where Lisa Tuttle described it as "a fine job", and from Euan Ferguson of The Observer, who wrote that "Colfer has pulled off the near-impossible."

Other reviews were more negative. Charlie Jane Anders, having read the first half of the book, described it as "more of the same" but without leaving a unique impression of its own, with the humour falling "incredibly flat". Private Eye summed it up as a "mostly humourless ... lame re-animation".
