= Mostly Harmless =

1992 comic science fiction novel by Douglas Adams

- First edition (UK)
- Author: Douglas Adams
- Language: English
- Series: The Hitchhiker's Guide to the Galaxy
- Genre: Comic Science Fiction
- Publisher: William Heinemann (UK); Harmony Books (US)
- Publication date: 1992
- Publication place: United Kingdom, United States
- Media type: Print (Hardcover and Paperback)
- Pages: 229, UK paperback; 240, US paperback
- ISBN: 0-330-32311-3
- OCLC: 29469448
- Preceded by: So Long, and Thanks for All the Fish
- Followed by: And Another Thing...

Mostly Harmless is a 1992 novel by Douglas Adams and the fifth book in the Hitchhiker's Guide to the Galaxy series. It is described on the cover of the first edition as "The fifth book in the increasingly inaccurately named Hitch Hiker's Guide to the Galaxy trilogy". It was the last Hitchhiker's book written by Adams and his final book released in his lifetime.

== Plot summary ==
Arthur Dent plans to sightsee across the Galaxy with his girlfriend Fenchurch, but she disappears during a hyperspace jump, a result of being from an unstable sector of the Galaxy. Depressed, Arthur continues to travel the galaxy using samples of his bodily tissues/fluids to fund his travels, assured of his safety until he visits Stavromula Beta, having killed an incarnation of Agrajag at some point in the future at said planet. During one trip, he ends up stranded on the homely planet Lamuella, and decides to stay to become a sandwich maker for the local population.

Meanwhile, Ford Prefect has returned to the offices of the Hitchhiker's Guide, and is annoyed to find out the original publishing company, Megadodo Publications, has been taken over by InfiniDim Enterprises, which are run by the Vogons. Fearing for his life, he escapes the building, along the way stealing the yet-unpublished, seemingly sentient Hitchhiker's Guide Mk. II. He goes into hiding after sending the Guide to himself, in the care of Arthur, for safekeeping.

On Lamuella, Arthur is surprised by the appearance of Trillian with a teenage daughter, Random Dent. Trillian explains that she wanted a child, and used the only human DNA she could find, thus claiming that Arthur is Random's father. She leaves Random with Arthur to allow her to better pursue her career as an intergalactic reporter. Random is frustrated with Arthur and life on Lamuella; when Ford's package to Arthur arrives, she takes it and discovers the Guide. The Guide helps her to escape the planet on Ford's ship after Ford arrives on the planet looking for Arthur. Discovering Random, the Guide, and Ford's ship missing, the two leave Lamuella on multidimensional Perfectly Normal Beasts and head for Earth, where they suspect Random is also heading to find Trillian. Ford expresses concern at the Guide's manipulation of events, noting its "Unfiltered Perception" and fearing its potency and ultimate objective.

Reporter Tricia McMillan is a version of Trillian living on an alternate Earth who never took Zaphod Beeblebrox's offer to travel in space. She is approached by an extraterrestrial species, the Grebulons, who have created a base of operations on the planet Rupert, a recently discovered tenth planet in the Solar System. However, due to damage to their ship in arriving, they have lost most of their computer core and their memories, with the only salvageable instructions being to observe something interesting with Earth. They ask Tricia's help to adapt astrology charts for Rupert in exchange for allowing her to interview them. She fulfills their request and conducts the interview, but the resulting footage looks so fake that she fears it will destroy her reputation if broadcast. She is called away from editing the footage to report on a spaceship landing in the middle of London.

As Tricia arrives at the scene, Random steps off the ship and begins to yell at her, mistaking Tricia for her mother. Arthur, Ford, and Trillian arrive and help Tricia to calm Random. They remove Random from the chaos surrounding the spacecraft and take her to a bar. Trillian tries to warn the group that the Grebulons, having become bored with their mission, are about to destroy the Earth. Random disrupts the discussion by producing a laser gun she took from her ship. Arthur, still believing he cannot die, tries to calm Random, but a distraction causes her to fire the weapon, sending the bar into a panic. Arthur tends to a man hit by the blast, who drops a matchbook with the name of the bar - "Stavro Mueller – Beta" - and Arthur realises that this is the scene of Agrajag's final death. He sees Ford laughing wildly at this turn of events and experiences a "tremendous feeling of peace".

The Grebulons destroy the Earth, believing that their horoscopes will improve if it is removed from their astrological charts. It is revealed that the Vogons designed the Guide Mk. II to achieve their desired outcome by manipulating temporal events. As a result, every version of the Earth in all realities is obliterated, fulfilling the demolition order that was issued in the first novel. Its mission complete, the Guide collapses into nothingness.

== Title ==
The title derives from a joke early in the series, when Arthur Dent discovers that the entry for Earth in The Hitchhiker's Guide to the Galaxy consists, in its entirety, of the word "Harmless". His friend Ford Prefect, a contributor to the Guide, assures him that the next edition will contain the article on Earth that Ford has spent the last 15 years researching—somewhat cut due to space restrictions, but still an improvement. The revised article, he eventually admits, will simply read "Mostly harmless". Ford had written an extensive entry covering life and recreation on Earth, but the Guide editors cut it back to "Harmless". Later in the series, Ford is surprised to find that the entry on Earth has been updated to include all of his original material, prompting him to hitchhike across the galaxy and reunite with Arthur on the alternate Earth in So Long, and Thanks for All the Fish.

== Reception ==
Unlike the previous books in the series, Mostly Harmless received mixed reviews noting its darker tone. Nicholas Lezard in The Guardian wrote: "I doubt there is a comedy sci-fi work bleaker than Mostly Harmless". The Independent concluded "Mostly Harmless has all the wit and inventiveness of vintage Douglas Adams, though its loose ends are not tied together as comprehensively as in previous Hitch-Hiker books". David Edelman in the Baltimore Evening Sun wrote: "Somewhere buried in the mess is a moral about learning how to feel at home in a chaotic universe. Unfortunately, Adams' skills at conveying serious messages are nowhere near on a level with his skill at conjuring up non sequiturs, and the idea gets buried".

In an interview reprinted in The Salmon of Doubt, Adams expressed dissatisfaction with the tone of this book, which he blamed on personal problems, saying "for all sorts of personal reasons that I don't want to go into, I just had a thoroughly miserable year, and I was trying to write a book against that background. And, guess what, it was a rather bleak book!"

== Adaptations ==
=== Radio ===
Dirk Maggs adapted the book as the "Quintessential Phase" of the radio series, and it was broadcast in June 2005. The radio version has an entirely new, upbeat ending, appended to the existing story.

In the alternate ending, after the destruction of Earth, the description of the Babel fish from the earlier series is replayed with an additional section, which states that dolphins and Babel fish are acquainted, and that the dolphins' ability to travel through possibility space (first mentioned in The Hitchhiker's Guide to the Galaxy and elaborated on in So Long, and Thanks for All the Fish) is shared by the Babel fish as well. During the ending, Ford explains that the dolphins got taught this skill from the Babel fish in exchange for knowing a good place to have parties. All the major characters are carrying Babel fish in their ears, which rescue them at the moment of Earth's destruction by transporting them to the Restaurant at the End of the Universe. It's also revealed that Fenchurch was transported here when she vanished and has been patiently waiting for Arthur to show up. The characters are reunited with Marvin, and it is revealed that beyond the Restaurant (and beyond the car park in which Marvin works) lies an endless series of blue lagoons — the final destination of the dolphins. The series ends with Arthur asking Fenchurch, "Will you come flying with me?", and her reply, "Always."

The version released on CD contains an even longer set of alternate endings, including one set after the events of the twelfth radio episode (with Arthur Dent and Lintilla), and on an alternate Earth where Arthur Dent and Fenchurch engage together in a stand-off against Mr. Prosser.

=== Audiobook ===
There have been three unabridged audiobook recordings of the novel. In 1992, Adams himself recorded an edition, later re-released by New Millennium Audio in the United States and available from BBC Audiobooks in the United Kingdom. In 2006, actor Martin Freeman, who had played Arthur Dent in the 2005 movie, recorded a new edition of the audiobook. This is the only book in the five novel series not to have also had a prior, abridged edition read by Stephen Moore. In addition, the National Library Service for the Blind and Physically Handicapped released a version of the book, narrated by George Guidall-Shapiro, on 4-track cassette tape in 1993.
