= Vogon =

Fictional alien race in The Hitchhiker's Guide to the Galaxy

Prostetnic Vogon Jeltz of the Galactic Hyperspace Planning Council tortures Ford Prefect and Arthur Dent with his poetry in the 2005 film The Hitchhiker's Guide to the Galaxy.

The Vogons are a fictional alien race from the planet Vogsphere in The Hitchhiker's Guide to the Galaxy—initially a BBC Radio series by Douglas Adams—who are responsible for the destruction of the Earth, in order to facilitate an intergalactic highway construction project for a hyperspace express route. Vogons are slug-like but vaguely humanoid, are bulkier than humans, and have green skin. Vogons are described as "one of the most unpleasant races in the galaxy—not actually evil, but bad-tempered, bureaucratic, officious and callous", and having "as much sex appeal as a road accident" as well as being the authors of "the third-worst poetry in the universe". They are employed as the galactic government's bureaucrats. According to Marvin the Paranoid Android, they are also the worst marksmen in the galaxy. They follow orders as they are told, and do not allow exceptions.

== Description ==
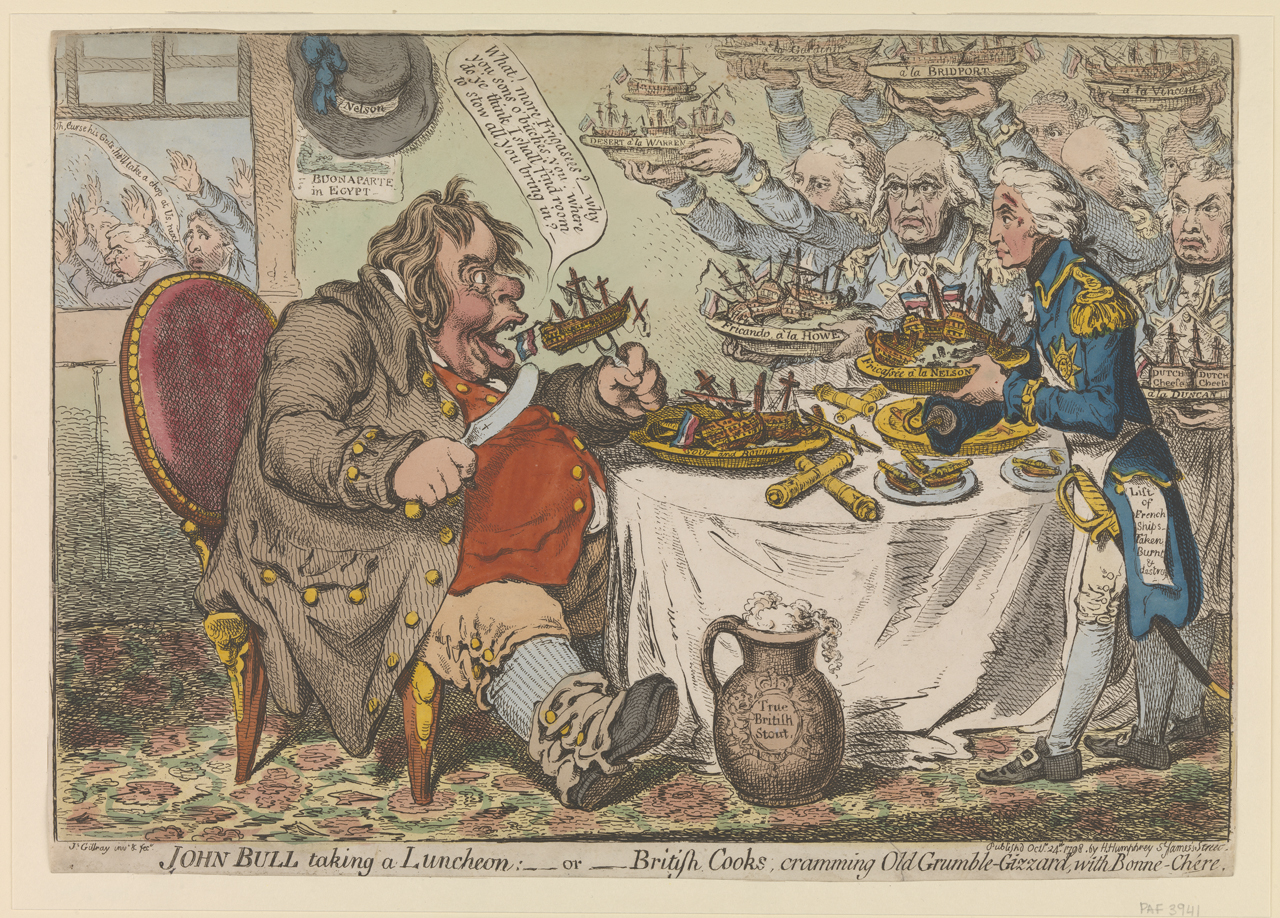
The Vogons' appearance in the film was partially based on the cartoons of James Gillray.

An animatronic Vogon head, used in the film version of the story

=== Appearance and personality ===
Guide description:

Here is what to do if you want to get a lift from a Vogon: forget it. They are one of the most unpleasant races in the Galaxy. Not actually evil, but bad-tempered, bureaucratic, officious and callous. They wouldn't even lift a finger to save their own grandmothers from the Ravenous Bugblatter Beast of Traal without orders—signed in triplicate, sent in, sent back, queried, lost, found, subjected to public inquiry, lost again, and finally buried in soft peat for three months and recycled as firelighters. The best way to get a drink out of a Vogon is to stick your finger down his throat, and the best way to irritate him is to feed his grandmother to the Ravenous Bugblatter Beast of Traal. On no account should you allow a Vogon to read poetry at you.

Vogons are roughly human-sized, although much bulkier, with green or grey skin. Their noses are above their eyebrows, which are either ginger (in the television series) or white (in the film). The film's commentary states that the idea behind the high flat noses was that they evolved both the noses and the severe bureaucracy from being repeatedly whacked by the paddle creatures under the sand on Vogsphere whenever they had an independent thought (in the film, the Vogon bureaucracy is centred on Vogsphere). In the radio series it is said that "Their highly domed nose rises above their small piggy forehead".

Garth Jennings based the visual portrayal of the Vogons in the 2005 film on the work of cartoonist James Gillray (1756–1815). "His creations were so grotesque...when we looked at them, we realised they were the Vogons".

=== Origins ===
The series tells that, far back in prehistory, when the first primeval Vogons crawled out of the sea, evolution gave up on them. Through sheer obstinacy, though, the Vogons survived (partly by adapting a misplaced, badly malformed, and dyspeptic liver into a brain). As the radio show says: "What nature refused to give to them, they did without. Until their myriad anatomical deficiencies could be rectified with surgery." They then emigrated en masse to the MeagaBrantis star cluster (although the film has them staying on Vogsphere), the political hub of the galaxy. They banish the ruling philosophers to the tax office to lick stamps and within a few short Voge years took over pretty much all of the galactic civil service, where they form most of the Galactic bureaucracy, most notably in the Vogon Constructor Fleets (which, despite their name, patrol the galaxy demolishing planets). The only named Vogons in the stories are Jeltz (see below), Kwaltz (who appears in the film), Zarniwoop, revealed to be a Vogon in the Quintessential Phase, and Jeltz's son Constant Mown. Two other named Vogon Constructor Fleet captains, Prostetnic Vogons Kutz and Yant, appear in Fit the Fourteenth announcing the demolition of the planets Avaruth and Regulo 7, respectively.

=== Behaviour ===
Vogons are described as officiously bureaucratic, a line of work at which they perform so well that the entire galactic bureaucracy is run by them.

On Vogsphere, the Vogons would sit upon very elegant and beautiful gazelle-like creatures, whose backs would snap instantly if the Vogons tried to ride them. The Vogons were perfectly happy with just sitting on them. Another favourite Vogon pastime is to import millions of beautiful jewel-backed scuttling crabs from their native planet, cut down giant trees of breathtaking beauty, and spend a happy drunken night smashing the crabs to bits with iron mallets and cooking the crab meat by burning the trees. In the movie, the Vogons seem to smash the crabs for no apparent reason besides pure pleasure at killing something.

In the film, Ford Prefect additionally tells Arthur Dent following the Guide's Vogon article that Vogons lack the ability of thought or imagination, and some can't even spell.

The Vogons' battle-cry, and counter-argument to dissent, is "resistance is useless!" (cf. "Resistance is futile").

=== Poetry ===
Jeltz reading poetry at Arthur Dent and Ford Prefect in the television series

Vogon poetry is described as "the third worst poetry in the Universe" (behind that of the Azgoths of Kria and that of Paula Nancy Millstone Jennings, the latter of which was destroyed when the Earth was). The main example used in the story is a short piece composed by Jeltz, which roughly emulates nonsense verse in style (example below). The story relates that listening to it is an experience similar to torture, as demonstrated when Arthur Dent and Ford Prefect are forced to listen to the poetry (and say how much they liked it) prior to being thrown out of an airlock.

"Oh freddled gruntbuggly,
Thy micturations are to me
As plurdled gabbleblotchits on a lurgid bee.
Groop, I implore thee, my foonting turlingdromes,
And hooptiously drangle me with crinkly bindlewurdles,
Or I will rend thee in the gobberwarts
With my blurglecruncheon, see if I don't!"

A second example of Vogon poetry is found in the Hitchhiker's Guide interactive fiction game that was produced by Infocom; responding to the poetry forms a major part of game play. The first verse is as above; one version of the second verse follows:

"Bleem miserable venchit! Bleem forever mestinglish asunder frapt.
Gashee morphousite, thou expungiest quoopisk!
Fripping lyshus wimbgunts, awhilst moongrovenly kormzibs.
Gerond withoutitude form into formless bloit, why not then? Moose."

An unused extended version of the poem is also excerpted in Neil Gaiman's book Don't Panic: The Official Hitchhiker's Guide to the Galaxy Companion, in Appendix III.

A third example appears in The Quintessential Phase of the radio series, again written by Jeltz.

A fourth example appears in And Another Thing..., the sixth book in the trilogy written by Eoin Colfer. The poem is also written by Jeltz.

== Prostetnic Vogon Jeltz ==
The Vogon captain in charge of overseeing the destruction of the Earth, Prostetnic Vogon Jeltz is sadistic and unpleasant to look at, even by Vogon standards. He enjoys shouting at or executing members of his own crew for insubordination, and takes professional pride in his job of demolishing planets. He very rarely smiles: "Prostetnic Vogon Jeltz smiled very slowly. This was done not so much for effect as because he was trying to remember the sequence of muscle movements."

It is revealed in The Restaurant at the End of the Universe that Jeltz had been hired by Gag Halfrunt to destroy the Earth (though in the film it was Zaphod who gave the order by mistake). Halfrunt had been acting on behalf of a consortium of psychiatrists and the Imperial Galactic Government in order to prevent the discovery of the Ultimate Question. When Halfrunt learns that Arthur Dent escaped the planet's destruction, Jeltz is dispatched to track him down and destroy him. Jeltz is unable to complete this task, due to the intervention of Zaphod Beeblebrox the Fourth, Zaphod's great-grandfather.

In Mostly Harmless, Jeltz is once again responsible for the destruction of the Earth, after the Vogons infiltrate the Hitchhikers' Guide company offices to turn the Guide into a device capable of destroying all Earths in every dimension, this time presumably killing Arthur, Ford, Trillian, and Arthur's daughter, Random—a fate dodged by the characters in the Quintessential Phase.

"Prostetnic Vogon" is a title, rather than part of his name, as at the beginning of the Quandary Phase he is described as belonging to the "Prostetnic class". Two other Prostetnic Vogons in the Constructor Fleet, Kutz and Yant, appear in the second episode of the Tertiary Phase alongside Jeltz announcing the demolition of their respective planets. In The Restaurant at the End of the Universe, Gag Halfrunt also refers to Jeltz as "Captain of Vogons Prostetnic".

Jeltz appears in:

- The Hitchhiker's Guide to the Galaxy
- The Restaurant at the End of the Universe
- Mostly Harmless
- And Another Thing...
- The Hitchhiker's Guide to the Galaxy (computer game)
- The Quintessential Phase.

In the first radio series, he was played by Bill Wallis, who also voiced Mr Prosser. Writer Marcus O'Dair found this "an appropriate casting decision since the character is, to an extent, Jeltz's Earth-bound alter ego." On television, the Vogon was portrayed by Martin Benson. In the third, fourth and fifth radio series, he was played by Toby Longworth, although Longworth did not receive a credit for the role during the third series. In the film, he is voiced by Richard Griffiths. In cartoon he is voiced by Rupert Degas.

Ronald E. Rice and Stephen D. Cooper considered Prostetnic Vogon Jeltz as a literary example of dysfunctional behaviour that may be facilitated by bureaucracies, comparable to the servants in Franz Kafka's novel The Castle and the bureaucrats in Terry Gilliam's movie Brazil: they "all fulfill their job descriptions and use resources so effectively that there is no recourse for the innocent, efficient, altruistic, or reasonable".

== Spacecraft ==
The ships of the Vogon Constructor Fleet were described as "impossibly huge yellow somethings" (the colour being a parallel to bulldozers that demolish Arthur's house) that "looked more like they had been congealed than constructed" and "hung in the air in much the same way that bricks don't"; they are said to be undetectable to radar and capable of travel through hyperspace. They are not crewed exclusively by Vogons; a species known as the Dentrassi are responsible for on-board catering.

In the television version of the story, the craft are shaped like battleships, albeit with a flat bottom through which the demolition beams are fired. In the film version, the craft are grey and cubic, a continuation of the emphasis on bureaucracy in the Vogons' conception: "Douglas [Adams]'s description of the Vogon ships hanging in the air in much the same way that bricks don't [led to] these Vogon ships which are these massive concrete tower blocks, with hardly any windows, they just have a few doors around the base," says Joel Collins.

== Analysis and reception ==
The name Vogons is a new lexeme, a word newly created by Douglas Adams that does not conform to a pattern of word formation. Stephen Webb found the appearance of this first alien race that features in The Hitchhiker's Guide to the Galaxy also "suitably strange, as aliens should be". The Vogons' behaviour in contrast turns out to be "full of very human—and specifically English—flaws and tendencies", to the point that Amanda Dillon considered them "probably the least othered alien in Adams's work". The Vogons are an easily recognizable satire of human middle-management culture and bureaucracy. Dillon found them "Adams's most fully formed direct parody of the alien, and this makes them a source of laughter rather than fear". The "silliness of Vogon bureaucracy" in its exaggeration is represented by "Adams's clever use of bathos" when he first uses very technical terms to describe their organizational processes but concludes with incongruously mundane words. For Vogons bureaucracy is an end-in-itself, "at which human and logic fail" and which intends to thwart real progress, making the scenes of interaction with these aliens "absurd". Marilette Van der Colff also noted that the failure "to notice its destructive influence on nature" by the management and the unconcerned and sometimes deliberate destruction of animal species by humans in general is reflected in the Vogons.

Marcus O'Dair praised the realization in the movie: "In this format, the Vogons really come into their own, their flattened faces, hunched backs and hopelessly overhanging bellies partly inspired by the work of eighteenth-century satirical cartoonist James Gillray." Author Martin Thomas Pesl included the Vogons in his list of the 100 most brilliant villains in world literature, under the category of despots. In his analysis of the depiction of extraterrestrials, Stephen Webb considered the Vogons "engaging aliens" despite their unpleasant traits, as they parodied middle-management behaviour so well that "I can't help but like them".

== In other media ==
Vogons was an Atari 130XE game, the goal being to avoid three "dreaded Vogons" moving quickly around the screen.
