= Ford Prefect (character) =

Alien researcher from The Hitchhiker's Guide to the Galaxy

- David Dixon as Ford Prefect in episode one of the BBC TV series
- First appearance: Fit the First (radio)
- Created by: Douglas Adams
- Portrayed by: Geoffrey McGivern (radio and LP versions); David Dixon (television); Mos Def (film)

In-universe information
- Nickname: Ix
- Species: Betelgeusian
- Gender: Male
- Occupation: Researcher for the Hitchhiker's Guide to the Galaxy
- Relatives: Zaphod Beeblebrox (semi-half cousin)
- Homeworld: Betelgeuse Five

Ford Prefect (also called Ix) is a character in The Hitchhiker's Guide to the Galaxy by the British author Douglas Adams. His role as Arthur Dent's friend – and rescuer, when Earth is unexpectedly demolished to make way for a hyperspace bypass at the start of the story – is often expository, as Ford is an experienced galactic hitchhiker and explains that he is actually a journalist, a field researcher for the titular Guide itself, and not an out-of-work actor from Guildford as he had claimed.

== Name ==
Although Ford had taken great care to blend into Earth society, he had "skimped a bit on his preparatory research", and thought that the name "Ford Prefect" would be "nicely inconspicuous".

The Ford Prefect was a popular British car manufactured from 1938 to 1961, and Adams later clarified in an interview that Ford "had simply mistaken the dominant life form" of Earth. This was expanded on somewhat in the film version, where Ford is almost run over while attempting to greet a blue Ford Prefect.

He is saved by Arthur and, in the film version of events, this is how the pair meet (this meeting also prompting Ford to rescue Arthur in particular when the Vogons come to destroy Earth). The graphics in the TV series provide a similar explanation by listing a sequence of names including 'Ford', beginning with director John Ford, Arthur Ford, news reader Anna Ford, carmaker Henry Ford, the Ford Anglia, the Ford Consul with the final name Ford Prefect being selected.

Adams later observed that this joke was lost on United States audiences who assumed it was a typing error for "perfect." In some versions, such as the French (Le Guide Galactique) and the Greek (Γυρίστε τον Γαλαξία με Ωτοστόπ), Ford's name was changed to "Ford Escort". In the Dutch translation, the car reference was dropped entirely instead opting for "Amro Bank", the name of the largest commercial bank in the Netherlands at the time. Nowadays, the joke is largely lost on younger audiences in Britain as well, since the Ford Prefect is now a rare sight on British roads. In the film adaptation, his last name was never actually stated on-screen, but it is given in the film's credits as "Prefect."

=== First birth name ===
A footnote in the novel explains that Ford's birth name is "only pronounceable in an obscure Betelgeusian dialect" which was almost wiped out by the "Great Collapsing Hrung Disaster of Gal./Sid./Year 03758", a mysterious catastrophe which took place on the planet of Betelgeuse Seven and which Ford's father was the only man to survive. Ford never learned to pronounce his birth name, which was a matter that caused his father to die of shame (which is still a terminal disease in some parts of the Universe). At school, he was nicknamed "Ix", which translates as "boy who is not able to satisfactorily explain what a Hrung is, nor why it should choose to collapse on Betelgeuse Seven".

Despite all this, his cousin (in the film, TV series, and radio show they are said to share three of the same mothers) Zaphod Beeblebrox calls him "Ford" the first time they are reunited in all versions of the story except for the film, where Zaphod addresses him as "Praxibetel Ix," then introduces him by saying "This is my semi-half brother, Ix... I'm sorry, sorry, Ford." While not explained in the book, a footnote of the original radio scripts explains that "just before arriving (on Earth) he registered his new name officially at the Galactic Nomenclaturoid Office, where they had the technology to unpick his old name from the fabric of space/time and thread the new one in its place, so that for all intents and purposes his name had always been and would always be Ford Prefect."

== Character and role ==
Adams conceived Ford as a polar opposite to The Doctor from the British science fiction television series, Doctor Who, for which he served as script editor in the late 1970s. "My original concept behind Ford Prefect was that given the choice between saving the planet and going to a good party, Ford would choose the party", Adams said in an interview with Macworld. Ford takes an existential view on the universe, sometimes bordering on joyful nihilism. He is eccentric and endlessly broad-minded – no doubt due to his vast experience of roughing it around the galaxy – and possesses of an off-key and often very dark sense of humour. He is described as being able to smile in a way that would "send hitherto sane men scampering into the trees". In his role as guide to the universe for the often bewildered everyman Arthur Dent, he serves to link the disparate elements of the story together. As well as rescuing Arthur, he introduces him to the other major characters – such as Zaphod, Trillian and Marvin the Paranoid Android – and to numerous mind-boggling concepts, from "teasers" (an explanation of UFO sightings on Earth) to the extraordinary usefulness of towels. Ford's other chief characteristic is his constant pursuit of an alcohol-fueled good time (in contrast to Arthur's quest for a cup of tea). Although his heart is in the right place and he is shown to be highly intelligent, resourceful and even brave, Ford is essentially a dilettante when it comes to causes such as the search for the question to the ultimate answer of "life, the universe and everything".

Ford carries the essential items of his profession in a leather satchel, hiding them under copies of play scripts in keeping with his public persona as an actor in search of work. Among the contents are his copy of the Guide; an Electronic Thumb, which he uses to signal passing spaceships in an attempt to hitch a ride; a Sub-Etha Sens-O-Matic, which monitors interstellar activity and alerts him to ships' proximity and origin; and a bath towel from Marks & Spencer.

Ford is approximately 200 years old, as supported by the books. When, in the first novel, Zaphod steals the spaceship Heart of Gold, it is on Zaphod's two-hundredth birthday. It is later mentioned that Ford and Zaphod attended school together, even having some of the same classes, which would indicate that they are roughly the same age. He had originally planned to spend a week on Earth doing research for the Guide, but wound up being stranded there for 15 years prior to helping Arthur escape the planet when the Vogons demolish it.

At the end of the final novel in the series, Mostly Harmless, Ford is apparently vaporised along with all the other main characters when the Vogons once again destroy the Earth. It is hinted, however, that he and the others may have survived. In the final episodes of the radio series, Ford, along with all the other main characters, is teleported to safety by the Babel Fish in his ear. The episode ends with a selection of possible outcomes for this last-second-teleportation, as the "unstable" nature of the section of galaxy Earth is in means that there are a variety of realities that the characters could find themselves in. The outcomes focus mostly on Arthur, but Ford features in the final possibility, where they all end up at Milliways (The Restaurant at the End of the Universe), drinking and chatting – and in Ford's case, flirting.

== Portrayals ==
In the original and following radio series and subsequent LP adaptation, Ford was played by Geoffrey McGivern. On television, he was played by David Dixon, and in the film he was played by Mos Def. In The Illustrated Hitchhiker's Guide to the Galaxy he is portrayed by Tom Finnis. Richard Hope played Ford in the first stage production of The Hitchhiker's Guide to the Galaxy with Ken Campbell’s The Science Fiction Theatre of Liverpool in May 1979 at the Institute of Contemporary Arts (ICA) in London.
