= Simon Jones (actor) =

British actor

- Born: 27 July 1950 (age 76); Charlton Park, Wiltshire, England
- Education: King's College, Taunton; Trinity Hall, Cambridge
- Occupation: Actor
- Years active: 1976–present
- Spouse: Nancy Lewis (died 2019)
- Children: 1

Simon Jones (born 27 July 1950) is an English actor. He is best known for originating the role of Arthur Dent, protagonist of Douglas Adams' The Hitchhiker's Guide to the Galaxy. He also played the role of Donald Shellhammer in Miracle on 34th Street (1994), appeared in Brideshead Revisited (1981) as Lord Brideshead, and as King George V in the film Downton Abbey (2019), and as Bannister in The Gilded Age.

== Early life ==
Jones was born 27 July 1950, in Charlton Park, Wiltshire, England. When young, his family moved to Broad Town near Wootton Bassett, travelling often to visit elderly aunts in Salisbury. Jones studied at King's College, Taunton, before going up to Trinity Hall, Cambridge, at age 25.

== Career ==
Jones appeared in various television series, including Brideshead Revisited, in which he played the Earl of Brideshead, or 'Bridey', heir to the Marquess of Marchmain, and the second series of Blackadder (1986), playing Sir Walter Raleigh in the episode "Potato". His films have included Club Paradise (1986), Privates on Parade (1982), Miracle on 34th Street and The Devil's Own (1997).

Jones was studying at Trinity Hall, Cambridge when he met Douglas Adams through Footlights. This led to him being cast in Out of the Trees and later The Hitchhiker's Guide to the Galaxy. The latter project, a radio broadcast from 1978, would be the first of Jones's several portrayals of Arthur Dent; Adams claimed to Jones that he wrote the part of Dent with him in mind. In Monty Python's The Meaning of Life, Jones had a minor role as one of the guests at the dinner party which is interrupted by the Grim Reaper. He has also appeared in some of the solo film projects of the members of Monty Python: Privates on Parade (with John Cleese), American Friends (1991) with Michael Palin. He appeared in the Terry Gilliam film Brazil (1985) alongside Jonathan Pryce and Robert De Niro, and also worked alongside Bruce Willis and Brad Pitt in 12 Monkeys (1995).

Jones has appeared in many Broadway plays, including The Real Thing (1985), as Max, Benefactors (1985), as Colin, Getting Married (1991), as Reginald Bridgenorth, Private Lives (1992), as Elyot Chase, The Real Inspector Hound, (as Moon) and The Fifteen Minute Hamlet (as Hamlet—which played together in 1992), The School for Scandal (1995), as Joseph Surface, Ring Round the Moon (1999), as Romainville and as Perry Lascoe in Waiting in the Wings (1999).

In 2009, Jones appeared in Blithe Spirit, as Dr. Bradman, supported by Angela Lansbury and Rupert Everett; and in 2018 he portrayed John Rich, in Farinelli and the King co-starring Mark Rylance. Off-Broadway he has a long list of credits, and was nominated for the 1990 Drama Desk Award Outstanding Featured Actor in a Play for his role in Privates on Parade.

Jones is also a voice actor and audiobook narrator, with more than 70 titles to his credit. Among them are:

- The Long Dark Teatime of the Soul for Simon and Schuster Audioworks for the US market
- Star Trek: Cacophony, playing Lt. Commander Stewart Mulligan in an original "Captain Sulu Adventures" audio programme, again for Simon and Schuster
- The Salmon of Doubt, for New Millennium Audio
- Douglas Adams at the BBC, for BBC Audio
- The Bartimaeus Sequence by Jonathan Stroud: The Amulet of Samarkand, The Golem's Eye, Ptolemy's Gate, The Ring of Solomon
- A Slight Trick of the Mind by Mitch Cullin, which won the Audio Publishers Association's 2006 Audie Award for Unabridged Fiction.
- And Another Thing..., the sixth instalment of The Hitchhiker's Guide to the Galaxy series, written by Eoin Colfer.
- Cloud Cuckoo Land by Anthony Doerr
- Right Ho, Jeeves by P. G. Wodehouse.

In 2003, Jones reprised his role as Arthur Dent in a new radio series of The Hitchhiker's Guide to the Galaxy. In the same year he was involved in the filming of the film version of the first novel, making a brief cameo appearance in the role of the holographic Magrathean answering machine/automated defence system.

In 2009, Jones was heard as master detective Sexton Blake on BBC Radio 2 in the six-part series, The Adventures of Sexton Blake!.

In 2012 and 2013, he returned to the UK, to star in a national stage tour of Hitchhiker's Guide to the Galaxy – Live!

The tour of Blithe Spirit, starring Angela Lansbury, then went to London's West End in early 2014. This was followed by BBC Radio appearances in Neil Gaiman and Terry Prachett's Good Omens, directed by Dirk Maggs, and Doctor Who with Tom Baker.

In 2018, Jones was once again playing Arthur Dent when he recorded the final radio series, Hitchhiker's Guide to the Galaxy – the Hexagonal Phase directed by Dirk Maggs for BBC Radio 4.

In August 2018, it was announced that Jones would be among the new cast to join the original actors in the Downton Abbey film, which started principal photography at about the same time.

In addition to his work as an actor, Jones is also a co-artistic director at New York Off-Broadway company The Actors Company Theatre (TACT).

== Personal life ==
Jones and his son Tim were hit by a car on 8 October 2010; though they suffered only bruises, he had to withdraw from The Actors Company Theatre's production of Václav Havel's Memorandum. On 20 December 2019 his wife, Nancy Lewis, died in Manhattan of leukaemia aged 76.

== Partial filmography ==
Sources:

- Sir Henry at Rawlinson End (1980) – Joachim
- The Hitchhiker's Guide to the Galaxy (1981, TV Series) – Arthur Dent
- Reds (1981) – Louise Bryant's Colleague in France (uncredited)
- Giro City (1982) – Henderson
- Privates on Parade (1982) – Sergeant Eric Young-Love
- Monty Python's The Meaning of Life (1983) – Chadwick / Jeremy Portland-Smythe
- Brazil (1985) – Arrest Official
- Blackadder II (1986, TV Series) – Sir Walter Raleigh
- Club Paradise (1986) – Toby Prooth
- Newhart (1987, TV Series) – Dr. Miles Rangel
- Green Card (1990) – Party Guest
- American Friends (1991) – Anderson
- For Love or Money (1993) – Albert
- Miracle on 34th Street (1994) – Donald Shellhammer
- 12 Monkeys (1995) – Zoologist
- The Devil's Own (1997) – Harry Sloan
- Guru in Seven (1998) – Removal man 1
- The Thomas Crown Affair (1999) – The Accountant (uncredited)
- Benjamin Franklin (2002, TV mini-series documentary) – Thomas Penn
- The Hitchhiker's Guide to the Galaxy (2005) – Ghostly Image
- Griffin & Phoenix (2006) – Professor
- Spectropia (2006) – The Duck
- The Search for Simon (2013) – The Man in the Hat
- The Hitchhiker's Guide to the Galaxy Radio Show Live (2016) – Arthur Dent
- Downton Abbey (2019) – George V
- The Gilded Age (2022–25, TV series) – Bannister
