= Lockwood & Co. (TV series) =

2023 British detective thriller television series

- Promotional poster
- Genre: Action-adventure; Detective; Drama; Supernatural horror
- Based on: Lockwood & Co. by Jonathan Stroud
- Developed by: Joe Cornish
- Directed by: William McGregor; Catherine Morshead; Joe Cornish
- Starring: Ruby Stokes; Cameron Chapman; Ali Hadji-Heshmati
- Opening theme: " Can't Leave the Night" by BadBadNotGood
- Composers: Joe Henson Alexis Smith; Christoph Bauschinger
- Country of origin: United Kingdom
- Original language: English
- No. of series: 1
- No. of episodes: 8

Production
- Executive producers: Nira Park; Rachael Prior; Joe Cornish
- Producer: James Biddle
- Production location: London
- Running time: 37–49 minutes
- Production company: Complete Fiction

Original release
- Network: Netflix
- Release: 27 January 2023

Lockwood & Co. is a British supernatural detective thriller television series developed by Joe Cornish for Netflix based on the book series by Jonathan Stroud. Consisting of eight episodes, it premiered on 27 January 2023. It follows the plots of the first two books, The Screaming Staircase and The Whispering Skull. In May 2023, the series was cancelled after one season.

== Premise ==
In an alternate version of present-day Britain, ghosts, known as visitors, have been rising from their graves for the past 50 years. Because of this phenomenon, known as "The Problem", technological advances have stopped; for example, there is no internet and people still use cassette recorders.

Most adults (over the age of 20) do not possess the ability to see or sense ghosts, unlike children. So youths have been organised into licensed ghost-hunting agencies to detect and dispose of threats. Lucy Carlyle, a psychically gifted teenager, runs away from home and comes to London, in the hope of catching on at an agency. Running out of options, she applies for a job at a tiny outfit run by two boys in an old townhouse: Lockwood & Co.

== Cast and characters ==
=== Main ===
- Ruby Stokes as Lucy Carlyle, a highly talented "Listener"—someone who can hear supernatural sounds and voices. She is also gifted with "touch". Pressed into ghost-hunting by her mother, she was unjustly made the scapegoat by her former supervisor in her former agency, Jacobs & Co., for a tragedy that killed four colleagues and left her best friend "ghost locked".
- Cameron Chapman as Anthony Lockwood, proprietor of Lockwood & Co., London's newest psychic investigations agency and the only one with no adult supervisors. Orphaned at a young age, he is the owner of 35 Portland Row, the Lockwood family residence, which serves as the agency’s office and home to its three members.
- Ali Hadji-Heshmati as George Karim, Lockwood's friend and the agency's head of research. Shy, but highly intelligent, he was fired from the prestigious Fittes agency for asking too many questions about "the Problem". In the book, the character was named George Cubbins. An excellent cook, he also serves as unofficial head chef at Portland Row.

=== Recurring ===
- Ivanno Jeremiah as Inspector Montagu Barnes, an official at the Department for Psychical Research and Control (DEPRAC), which regulates agency work and responds to paranormal incidents
- Jack Bandeira as Quill Kipps, the top agent at Fittes, charged with solving its most dangerous cases. He is a longtime rival of Lockwood's
- Rhianna Dorris as Kat Godwin, a member of Kipps's elite team and effectively his second-in-command
- Paddy Holland as Bobby Vernon, a young researcher on Kipps's team whose grasp of the Problem is almost as good as George's
- Rico Vina as Ned Shaw, the fourth member of Kipps's team
- Bronwyn James as Sergeant Wade, Barnes's hardline deputy
- Louise Brealey as Pamela Joplin, a driven researcher at Sweet Dreams Excavations whose job is to identify potentially haunted gravesites. This character in the book series was named Albert Joplin and reportedly looked very similar to George

=== Guest ===
- Lily Newmark as Norrie White, Lucy's best friend and colleague at her first agency, who is "ghost-locked" (which is something similar to being trapped in a coma) after the tragedy
- Andrew Woodall as Jacobs, the alcoholic proprietor of Jacobs & Co., Lucy's first agency
- Sandra Huggett as Mrs. Carlyle, Lucy's uncaring mother
- Ishtar Currie-Wilson as Annabel "Annie" Ward, a British actress who disappeared in the 1980s
- Sharon Morgan as Mrs. Hope, the owner of the estate Lucy and Lockwood accidentally set fire to during a case
- Saverio Buono as Hugo Blake, an actor suspected of Annabel's murder
- Nigel Planer as Sir John Fairfax, an industrialist who has made millions from the global demand for iron as a means of repelling ghosts. He is later found out to be the murderer of Annie Ward
- Lily Nichol as Ellie, Fairfax's assistant, a former agent
- Morven Christie as Penelope Fittes, enigmatic head of the Fittes agency and the public face of Britain's ghost-hunting effort
- Jeff Rawle as Sebastian Saunders, Joplin's business partner at Sweet Dreams Excavations
- Saskia Axten as Genevieve, a Sensitive employed by Sweet Dreams
- Michael Clarke as the Skull, a ghost contained in a secure jar George stole from the Fittes agency, now kept at Portland Row
- Amanda Abbington as Marissa Fittes, Penelope's mother; the late founder of the Fittes agency and Britain's most famous ghost hunter. (In the book, it is later revealed that she and Penelope are one and the same)
- Hayley Konadu as Florence Bonnard ("Flo Bones"), a mudlark and friend of Lockwood's who makes a living illegally selling haunted relics or "Sources"
- Ben Crompton as Julius Winkman, a violent and lawless relic dealer involved in the black market trade of "Sources", who masquerades as an antique dealer
- Alice Lowe as Adelaide Winkman, Julius's wife and partner in crime
- Conall Turner as Leopold, the Winkmans' son
- Jethro Skinner as Jack Carver, a relic man involved in the theft of the Bone Glass
- Luke Treadaway as The Golden Blade, a dangerous antagonist with a gold-bladed sword whose allegiance and motives are unclear. In the book, he is known as Sir Rupert Gale
- Paul Thornley as Cutter, an undercover DEPRAC officer infiltrating the Winkmans' operation

== Episodes ==
No.	Title	Directed by	Written by	Original release date
1	"This Will Be Us"	Joe Cornish	Joe Cornish	27 January 2023
13-year old Lucy Carlyle is sent to Jacobs, a local agency that trains youths to hunt ghosts, where she achieves her first, second, and third grades in ghost fighting. Three years later, Lucy's training comes to an abrupt end following the deaths of four students. After an argument with her unsupportive mother, Lucy flees to London seeking to join another ghost hunting agency, despite not achieving her fourth grade. Upon being turned down by some of the country's most prestigious agencies, she joins Lockwood and Co., run by Anthony Lockwood and George Karim. She moves into the attic at Portland Row, and is curious about a locked room on the floor below that Lockwood never talks about. She and Lockwood go to a house to exorcise the ghost haunting it so the owner can sell it, but the house lights on fire. To learn more about the ghost who haunts it, Lucy steals its 'source', a ring, and then she and Lockwood jump off the side of the house to escape the fire.
2	"Let Go of Me"	William McGregor	Joy Wilkinson & Kara Smith	27 January 2023
DEPRAC fines Lockwood £60,000 for the damage to the house. The team's investigations reveal the ghost is the actress Annabel Ward, who disappeared in the 1980s; Lucy's psychic connection to Annabel grows intense. Inspector Barnes discovers Lucy has not achieved her grade 4 and tells Lockwood to fire her. Lockwood realises solving Annabel's high-profile murder could help pay the fine and protect Lucy's position. He gives a TV interview boasting of Lucy's psychic talents, which upsets her. Returning home after being called to DEPRAC, Lucy tries to resign, but is talked down by Lockwood. At home they fight off an intruder who had tied George up and was looking for the ring; Lucy reveals that in fact she had been wearing it round her neck.
3	"Doubt Thou the Stars"	William McGregor	Ed Hime	27 January 2023
To help pay the fine, Lockwood answers an ad for a dangerous job. The client is Sir John Fairfax, a showbiz impresario turned industrialist, who will pay them £60,000 to clear the ghosts at his stately home. On arrival, they discover Fairfax has misrepresented the dangers and they barely survive. Lockwood realises they had been brought to the house to die, and that Fairfax, who knew Annabel in his theatrical days, is her killer. Fairfax returns to the hall to shoot the trio. Lucy releases Annabel's ghost from the ring and Annabel kills Fairfax. DEPRAC arrives and covers up the whole case, forcing Lockwood & Co. to silence, but the fine is settled and Lucy is awarded her grade 4. Back at home, while Lucy is in the cellar, she is overcome by a spectral voice calling to her and faints.
4	"Sweet Dreams"	William McGregor	Ed Hime	27 January 2023
Sebastian Saunders and Pamela Joplin of gravediggers Sweet Dreams ask the agency to investigate an unusual coffin. At the graveyard, Lucy, unsettled by the incident in the cellar, is distressed and, upon opening the coffin, George briefly looks into a strange mirror in the corpse's hand. Lucy remembers the voice she heard, and realises the Skull, which the boys keep in the cellar, had called to her. Back home, she discovers she can converse with the ghost—an almost unique talent. The mirror is stolen, and Barnes orders Quill Kipps at the Fittes agency to investigate. When George reveals he has identified the corpse as the Victorian occultist Edmund Bickerstaff, Lockwood & Co. and Kipps's team are jointly given the case. Lockwood's and Kipps's rivalry flares up, and the case becomes a competition.
5	"Death Is Coming"	Catherine Morshead	Joy Wilkinson	27 January 2023
George discovers a body in the canal by the graveyard. It is Danny Clough, a friend of Lockwood's turned "relic man". Lockwood takes Lucy to meet his friend Flo Bones, who also deals in haunted relics. She tells them Danny had a partner, Jack Carver, and did deals with the dangerous Mr and Mrs Winkman. Lockwood leaves a message for Carver. George, who has been feeling odd since glimpsing the mirror, goes to the archives to research the case. He encounters Joplin and they spend the day working together. Eager to outdo Kipps, Lockwood breaks into the Winkmans' premises in search of the mirror. He and Lucy are captured and face death until Lucy engineers their escape. They arrive home moments before Carver shows up. He collapses, having been stabbed. With his last breath, he warns them about the mirror, which he calls the "Bone Glass".
6	"You Never Asked"	Catherine Morshead	Joy Wilkinson	27 January 2023
George's researches reveal Bickerstaff was a famous doctor who held 'gatherings' at his mansion—a secret exposed by one guest, Mary Dulac, who went insane. The Skull speaks to Lucy, saying he was an acolyte of Bickerstaff's, and urging them to take him to the derelict mansion. In the house, Lucy realises Bickerstaff had been killing people in his care; she finds his papers but has to be rescued from his patients' ghosts. Flo informs Lockwood the Bone Glass is to be auctioned that night. The papers reveal the murders were committed to create 'sources' for the Glass, and that Dulac wrote a memoir, a rare copy of which is held at the Fittes agency. The team has been invited to a ball at Fittes that evening; they plan to get the book and then attend the auction. George invites Joplin over to do more research. Lucy and Lockwood go to the ball, find the book, and escape after being stopped by a mysterious man with a gold-bladed sword.
7	"Mesmerised"	Catherine Morshead	Ed Hime	27 January 2023
Flo takes the trio by boat to the wharf where the auction is being held. Lucy and Lockwood sneak in. They encounter an undercover DEPRAC officer, who tells them to leave, but they join the bidders. Flo takes the boat out to mid-river and challenges George about having been "mesmerised" by the Bone Glass. Lockwood is unmasked, so he grabs the Glass and he and Lucy flee. They are cornered and Winkman orders the undercover officer to kill them; instead, he aids their escape and is himself killed. Golden Blade appears. Fleeing to the roof, they radio to Flo and George. Lucy throws the Glass down to the boat and Flo and George take it away. As Golden Blade closes in, Lucy and Lockwood jump into the river. Flo escorts George to DEPRAC with the Glass and leaves him there. Lockwood and Lucy reach the riverbank. Alone, George cannot bear to hand the Glass in. He goes to a phone box and makes a call.
8	"Not the Eternal"	Joe Cornish	Joe Cornish	27 January 2023
Lucy and Lockwood get home. Reading Dulac's memoir, they realise the effect the Bone Glass must have had on George. They interrogate the Skull; he says that Joplin called George to the graveyard. Joplin leads George into the catacombs. They encounter Kipps, and Joplin ties him up and places him in front of the Glass. George realises that her intentions are bad and he is tied up too, taking Kipps's place. Lucy and Lockwood arrive at the graveyard and meet Kipps’s team. Winkman's thugs arrive to retrieve the Glass. Lucy and the Skull go after George while Lockwood and Kipps's team fight Winkman's gang. The Skull tells Lucy that the Glass is a window to "the Eternal", and the only safe way to use it is to watch someone else's face change as they look into it. Lockwood goes to find Lucy, but Golden Blade is lurking and shoots him. Lucy finds Joplin and volunteers to look into the Glass. When Joplin uncovers it, Lucy turns away and holds up the Skull to look. He screams. Lucy passes out. George throws himself into the stand holding the Glass; it falls and cracks. Joplin picks it up; it consumes her in a beam of light and shatters. Bickerstaff's ghost rises but a wounded Lockwood appears and fights it off. Barnes and DEPRAC arrive to clean up.

== Production ==
=== Development ===
In 2017 it was announced that Nira Park and Rachael Prior had optioned the rights to Jonathan Stroud's Lockwood & Co. book series while at Big Talk Productions. In 2019 they left Big Talk to set up Complete Fiction Pictures and produced the TV series under their new banner. On 19 May 2020 it was announced that Complete Fiction was working with Netflix to develop the series, and Joe Cornish was set to helm and executive produce the series. In December 2020, Netflix officially gave an eight-episode series order to Lockwood & Co. Cornish served as lead writer and director. Park, Prior, and Cornish served as executive producers. William McGregor was also involved in directing several episodes. Ed Hime, Kara Smith, and Joy Wilkinson were the writers.

=== Casting ===
The cast was confirmed in March 2022 with Ruby Stokes, Cameron Chapman and Ali Hadji-Heshmati set to star alongside Ivanno Jeremiah, Luke Treadaway and Morven Christie. Also joining the cast were Jack Bandeira, Ben Crompton, Hayley Konadu, Rhianna Dorris and Paddy Holland.

=== Filming ===
Filming began on 5 July 2021 in London. A house on Claremont Square in Islington was chosen for the exterior shots of 35 Portland Row, with the interiors of the house constructed as sets at Ealing Studios. Filming occurred at the Kensal Green Cemetery in late October 2021. Scenes at haunted "Combe Carey Hall" for episode 3 were shot at Mentmore Towers in Buckinghamshire and the part of the series set in Lucy's unidentified hometown was filmed in Chipping Campden in Gloucestershire. The series wrapped on 15 March 2022.

=== Music ===
Cornish chose to include in the series songs relying on early goth rock from the repertoire of Bauhaus, the Cure, Siouxsie and the Banshees and This Mortal Coil. Journalist Matthew Mahler noted: "The score seems [...] to create a truly supernatural aural palette."

Of the music, Cornish said: "We went back to a lot of post-punk, [...] music like Siouxsie and the Banshees and The Cure and Bauhaus that have this kind of romantic, doom-laden spookiness to them, and they feel very analog [...] They feel alive, they feel haunted, and they have a terrific, beautiful melancholy to them. We had a playlist very early on of those tracks of Bauhaus and Siouxsie and The Cure". Many of the bands are referenced in posters in characters' rooms.

== Reception ==
=== Critical reception ===
The review aggregator website Rotten Tomatoes reported a 100% approval rating based on 14 critic reviews and an average rating of 8.00/10. The website's critical consensus reads, "A paranormal procedural steered by writer-producer Joe Cornish's usual deft hand, Lockwood & Co. is a fun-filled adventure carried off with sprightly charm." Metacritic, which uses a weighted average, assigned a score of 76 out of 100 based on 8 critics, indicating "generally favorable reviews".

Leila Latif of The Guardian wrote: "Lockwood and Co is a delight, with a level of intelligence and respect for its source material, its characters and its audience." Writing in Empire, Boyd Hilton said: "Forget the YA label; this is an addictive, sophisticated supernatural thriller which will keep cynical old duffers entertained throughout." Naming it one of Variety's Best Netflix Shows of 2023, Kate Arthur wrote: "Well-acted, atmospheric, inventive and creepy, 'Lockwood & Co.' effectively set up a world ripe for more seasons."

=== Audience viewership ===
Lockwood & Co. featured in the Netflix global top 10s for 3 weeks between 22 January and 12 February, picking up 79.91 million hours. It reached Netflix's Global Top #1 Show spot in its second week on the platform, holding the number one spot in 18 countries. Over the first half of 2023, the show ranked fourth among Netflix UK's original shows, with 113 million hours viewed, and 80th globally among all Netflix titles.

=== Awards and nominations ===
Year	Award	Category	Nominee	Result	Reference
2023	National Film Awards	Best TV Drama Series	Lockwood & Co.	Nominated	
2023	The Golden Nib Awards	Best Contemporary and Sci-Fi Graphics in a TV Drama	Lockwood & Co.	Nominated	

== Cancellation ==
On May 12, 2023, Stroud and Complete Fiction Picture announced that the series had been cancelled. Variety added that the "viewing numbers didn't meet the threshold to greenlight a second season". Fans expressed their disappointment on social media, and some publications criticized Netflix's habit of prematurely cancelling series, especially young adult-related and fantasy-related ones.
