= The Screaming Staircase =

2013 novel by Jonathan Stroud

- UK cover
- Author: Jonathan Stroud
- Illustrator: Kate Adams
- Cover artist: Alessandro "Talexi" Taini (UK)
- Series: Lockwood & Co.
- Release number: 1
- Genre: Supernatural, thriller
- Publisher: Random House (UK); Disney-Hyperion (US)
- Publication date: August 29, 2013 (UK); September 17, 2013 (US)
- Publication place: United Kingdom
- Media type: Hardcover, Paperback, ebook, Audio CD
- Pages: 384
- ISBN: 978-1-4231-6491-3
- Followed by: The Whispering Skull

The Screaming Staircase is a young adult, supernatural thriller novel by Jonathan Stroud. It is the first book in the series Lockwood & Co., and was published on 29 August 2013 by Random House in the United Kingdom, and by Disney-Hyperion in the United States on 17 September 2013.

The story is set in a version of modern-day London experiencing an event called "the Problem," ghosts which appear throughout the city at nighttime and attack the living. Agencies have been created to fend off the ghosts and protect the public for a fee. However, only certain children and teenagers have the "talent" to sense the ghosts, which they gradually lose as they reach their twenties. The agencies are run by those who have passed the ghost-sensitive age, and the agents are the youth with the talents necessary to solve the hauntings, which puts them in danger in the process.

The story follows Lucy Carlyle and Lockwood & Co., the only supernatural agency in London run solely by children. The agency is led by Anthony Lockwood and has one other member prior to Lucy's joining, George Cubbins. As the series progresses, they investigate and solve hauntings and find deeper truths behind the ghosts and the Problem.

== Plot ==
A sinister Problem has occurred in London: all natures of ghosts, haunts, and spectres, who are weakened by iron and salt, are appearing throughout the city, and they are not exactly friendly. All ghosts have a "source" where they originate from, though if the "source" is destroyed or neutralised the ghost will be as well. Only young people have the psychic abilities required to see and eradicate these unnatural foes. Many different Detection Agencies have cropped up to handle the dangerous work, and they are in fierce competition for business. When the brave Lucy Carlyle joins the small but enterprising agency Lockwood & Co., which consists of George Cubbins (researcher), Anthony Lockwood (leader), and Lucy Carlyle (assistant), approximately a month later they are sued for a job gone wrong, resulting in the house of their employer burning down. So that DEPRAC (Department of Psychical Research and Control) does not close down their agency, they are forced to take on the de-haunting of the most haunted house in England for the sinister millionaire John Fairfax (owner of Fairfax Iron, an iron manufacturing company) with even odder conditions, such as no explosives.

The group ultimately survives the night and solves the mystery of the house and Fairfax, and the book ends with a celebration.

== Characters ==
- Lucy Carlyle: The newest member of Lockwood & Co. and the narrator of the book, Lucy is 15 years old, and is described as quick to start a fight. She was known in earlier revisions as Lucy Purser. The daughter of a stationmaster in the North of England, she joined a local agency at an early age. However, after a disastrous case resulting in the loss of her fellow agents, Lucy left her former employment and family to start afresh in London. Lucy's Talent lies in her hearing and empathy through touch.
- Anthony Lockwood: The leader of Lockwood & Co., often referred to as just Lockwood. He is described as "dashing" and "a bit reckless". His Talent is a sharp "sight"—seeing ghosts and deathglows, the psychic residue left by a violent death. Lockwood is known for his quick yet thorough approach to hauntings and prides himself on his abilities. He is a mysterious young man; orphaned and living alone on his family's property.
- George Cubbins: Anthony's deputy, and quite cynical. He is rather portly and a little slovenly. George is much more focused on research and preparation than the other two agents, and prefers a longer time between assignments in order to do such. He rarely gets along with his fellow agent Lucy, but he shares a strong passion with Lockwood. He is also quite attached to a skull in a glass jar which he owns. The skull is possessed by a ghost.
- Suzie Martin: The daughter of Mrs. Hope, she meets Lockwood & Co. in her mother's absence, so they can investigate the presence of a Visitor in her family's home. She is quite sceptical of how young the agency is.
- Annie Ward: A young woman who returns as a type-two ghost following her death. Lockwood & Co. encounter her at the beginning of the book, and then go on to solve the mystery of her murder. Her Source is a locket which Lockwood & Co. found around the neck of her corpse. She and Lucy share a strong psychic connection.
- Inspector Barnes: An investigator for DEPRAC (Department of Psychical Research and Control), which is based at Scotland Yard. Barnes seems to disapprove of and possibly dislike Lockwood and George, however cooperates with them in the case of Annie Ward.
- Sir John William Fairfax: The wealthy industrialist who owns the haunted Combe Carey Hall, assigns Lockwood & Co. the mystery within the mansion and offers them the money needed to save the company from debt.
- Hugo Blake: Annie Ward's boyfriend, who was accused of murdering Annie Ward when he was 22.

== Sequels ==
A sequel to the book, titled The Whispering Skull, was published in September 2014. A second sequel, titled The Hollow Boy, was published in September 2015. The fourth book in the series, The Creeping Shadow, was published in September 2016. The final book, The Empty Grave, was published in September 2017. A related book, The Dagger in the Desk, was published in February 2015.

== Adaptations ==
The film rights were acquired in December 2012 by Illumination Entertainment and Universal Pictures, making this the first live-action project for the former. The film, titled Lockwood & Co.: The Screaming Staircase, was to be produced by Illumination Entertainment CEO Chris Meledandri. However, in September 2017 it was announced that Big Talk Productions had optioned the rights to Lockwood & Co., with plans to adapt it into a television series. In December 2020, the show was announced to be going to Netflix, adapted by Joe Cornish. Filming began on the Lockwood & Co. television series in the week following 5 July 2021, and it premiered on 27 January 2023.

== Reception ==
The Screaming Staircase has received the following accolades:

- Cybils Award (Speculative Fiction) (2013)
- Goodreads Choice Award (Middle Grade & Children's)(2013)
- Los Angeles Times Book Prize (2014)
- Mystery Writers of America's Edgar Awards (Best Juvenile)(2014)
- Jewish Community Secondary School's WeRead Prize (2014)
- BookTrust and Amazon Kindle's Booktrust Best Book Awards shortlist (9-11 Best Story) (2014)
- North Carolina Young Adult Book Award nominee (2014)
- Carnegie Medal for Literature nominee (2014)
- Worcestershire Public Libraries' Worcestershire Teen Book Award shortlist (2014)
- Silver Inky Award shortlist (2014)
- International Librarians of Japan's Sakura Medal nominee (2015)
- Stratford Girls' Grammar School's Warwickshire Secondary Book Awards (2015)
- Coventry City Council's Coventry Inspiration Book Awards shortlist (2015)
- UKYA Blogger Awards' UKYA Blogger Awards nominee (2015)
- The Weald School's Weald Book Award shortlist (2015)
- American Library Association's Popular Paperbacks for Young Adults (2015)
- Children's Literature Association of Utah Beehive Book Awards nominee (Young Adult Fiction) (2016)
- Nevada Library Association's Nevada Young Readers' Award (Intermediate) (2016)
- Washington Library Association's Sasquatch Award nominee (2016)
- Rebecca Caudill Young Readers' Book Award nominee (2017)
