= Lockwood & Co. =

Young adult supernatural novel series

- The Screaming Staircase (2013); The Whispering Skull (2014); The Hollow Boy (2015); The Creeping Shadow (2016); The Empty Grave (2017)
- Author: Jonathan Stroud
- Country: United Kingdom
- Language: English
- Genre: Supernatural, thriller, Occult detective fiction
- Publisher: Random House (UK); Disney-Hyperion (US)
- Published: 29 August 2013 – 12 September 2017
- Media type: Print (hardback & paperback); Audiobook; E-book
- No. of books: 5

Lockwood & Co. is a young adult supernatural thriller series by Jonathan Stroud. It follows three young operatives of a psychic detection agency (Anthony Lockwood, Lucy Carlyle and George Cubbins) as they fight ghosts (known as Visitors) in London, England.

The series consists of five books: The Screaming Staircase, The Whispering Skull, The Hollow Boy, The Creeping Shadow, and The Empty Grave, published from 2013 to 2017.

== Supplementary work ==
A short story was released over six days in late October 2013 on The Guardian's website. It was written by Stroud, with input from readers to decide the location, the type of ghost, and its title, which became The Dagger in the Desk. "A Portland Row Christmas" and "The Apple Tree"(something of a prequel) are also short stories by Jonathan Stroud.

== Reception ==
=== The Screaming Staircase ===
The Screaming Staircase has received the following accolades:

- Cybils Award (Speculative Fiction) (2013)
- Goodreads Choice Award (Middle Grade & Children's) (2013)
- Los Angeles Times Book Prize (2014)
- Mystery Writers of America's Edgar Awards (Best Juvenile) (2014)
- Jewish Community Secondary School's WeRead Prize (2014)
- BookTrust and Amazon Kindle's Booktrust Best Book Awards shortlist (9-11 Best Story) (2014)
- North Carolina Young Adult Book Award nominee (2014)
- Carnegie Medal for Literature nominee (2014)
- Worcestershire Public Libraries' Worcestershire Teen Book Award shortlist (2014)
- Silver Inky Award shortlist (2014)
- International Librarians of Japan's Sakura Medal nominee (2015)
- Stratford Girls' Grammar School's Warwickshire Secondary Book Awards (2015)
- Coventry City Council's Coventry Inspiration Book Awards shortlist (2015)
- UKYA Blogger Awards' UKYA Blogger Awards nominee (2015)
- The Weald School's Weald Book Award shortlist (2015)
- American Library Association's Popular Paperbacks for Young Adults (2015)
- Children's Literature Association of Utah Beehive Book Awards nominee (Young Adult Fiction) (2016)
- Nevada Library Association's Nevada Young Readers' Award (Intermediate) (2016)
- Washington Library Association's Sasquatch Award nominee (2016)
- Rebecca Caudill Young Readers' Book Award nominee (2017)

=== The Whispering Skull ===
The Whispering Skull has received the following accolades:

- Kirkus starred review (2014)
- Booklist starred review (2014)
- Goodreads Choice Award (Middle Grade & Children's) nominee (2014)
- American Library Association's Amazing Audiobooks for Young Adults (2015)

=== The Hollow Boy ===
The Hollow Boy has received the following accolades:

- Goodreads Choice Award (Middle Grade & Children's) nominee (2015)
- Booklist starred review (2016)

=== The Creeping Shadow ===
The Creeping Shadow has received the following accolades:

- Goodreads Choice Award nominee (Middle Grade & Children's) (2015)
- Booklist starred review (2016)

=== The Empty Grave ===
The Empty Grave has received the following accolades:

- Booklist starred review (2017)
- Booklist Editor's Choice Books for Youth (2017)
- Goodreads Choice Awards (Middle Grade & Children's) (2017)
- Carnegie Medal nominee (2019)

== TV series ==
In September 2017, it was announced that Big Talk Productions had optioned the rights to Lockwood & Co., with plans to adapt it into a television series. In December 2020, the show was announced to be going to Netflix, adapted by Joe Cornish. Filming began on the series in the week following 5 July 2021. The series premiered on 27 January 2023, consisting of eight episodes. In May 2023, the series was cancelled after one season, due to lack of viewership.
