= David Heron =

David Heron may refer to:

- David Heron (rugby league) (born 1958), English rugby league footballer
- David W. Heron (1920–2009), American librarian
- David Heron (statistician) (1881–1969), Scottish statistician

== See also ==
- David Herron (born 1984), American football linebacker
