= The Whispering Skull =

The Whispering Skull may refer to:

- The Whispering Skull (film), 1944 film
- The Whispering Skull (novel), by Jonathan Stroud
