= Heroes of the Valley =

2009 novel by Jonathan Stroud

- First edition cover
- Author: Jonathan Stroud
- Illustrator: Douglas Smith
- Cover artist: petrolad.com
- Genre: Fantasy
- Publisher: Hyperion Books
- Publication date: 2009
- Media type: Print
- ISBN: 978-1-4231-0966-2
- OCLC: 294861087
- LC Class: PZ7.S92475 He 2009

Heroes of the Valley is a 2009 fantasy adventure novel written by English writer Jonathan Stroud. The protagonist of the novel is Halli Sveinsson, a boy from a village nestled atop a mountain.

== Development ==
Development for the book began in 2006, following the end of Stroud's Bartimaeus Trilogy, and finished in the summer of 2008. Stroud has stated that:

"I’ve always liked reading Norse myths and legends, and the Icelandic Sagas, written in the Middle Ages by the descendents of Vikings. The Sagas are interesting because they mix ordinary domestic stories about farms and families with sudden bits of supernatural stuff, featuring ghosts and trolls. The fantasy never takes over, but it never goes away either; it’s just taken for granted by the people as something on the margin of their lives. I was keen to try a saga of my own, which would explore themes of story-telling and family life, and began jotting down a few fragments of story."

== Plot ==
Halli Sveinsson loves to hear stories from the days when the valley was a wild and dangerous place, besieged by the bloodthirsty Trow. Now farming has taken over from fighting Trows, and to Halli's disappointment, heroics seem a thing of the past. But when a practical joke rekindles an old blood feud, he sees a chance for a daring quest of his own.

The tale begins with the Battle of the Rock being told to a child. This was when twelve heroes of the valley joined together to fight the ruthless Trows (man eating monsters) who were devastating the land. Taking up positions on a large rock, they were finally attacked at dusk by the Trows, who they fended off all night. In the morning, when the people returned to see what had happened, all were dead, Trows and Heroes, including Svein, their leader.

The heroes were buried under cairns along the borders of the valley with their swords, so that, even in death, they could guard the boundaries from the Trows. As long as no one crosses the cairn border, the legends say, no Trows can enter the Valley.

Many years later, Halli is born. He is a very short, stout, and headstrong boy who longs for the days of the Heroes, when a man could fight for what he wanted and take what he could win. He longs to leave the valley, which is now ruled by a Council of women who demand peace and equality in the land. They have outlawed swords and other weapons to discourage wars. Halli looks very much like his uncle Brodir, whom he adores. He is the third and last child in his family, who are Arnkel, his father and Arbiter of Svein's House, Astrid, his mother and Law-Giver of Svein's House, Leif, his older brother who is immediately in line for the Arbiter after Arnkel, Gudny, his sister and Brodir, who is the only relative who seems to get along with him.

When his uncle is murdered by the rival house of Hakonssons, Halli sets off to avenge him. Finally, he thinks that he will have a hero's quest of his own.

But during his journey, Halli realizes that he isn't the pitiless avenging killer that he thought he could be. His interference and thirst for revenge leads two men to their deaths, and he becomes sick with guilt. He returns home to his relieved yet angry family, and his distrusting and fearful fellow villagers. His actions eventually lead to an attack by the House of Hakon, and he alone can accept responsibility and take charge of his defenseless village.

The enemy arrives and they have an obvious advantage—swords. Halli realizes that his peoples' only hope is if he lures the enemy in the dark past the cairn boundaries. He does so with the help of his friend, Aud Arnsdottir, and to his relief, it works. The Hakonssons are eaten by monsters in the moorlands. However, Halli and Aud also come under attack. Much like the heroes of old, they take their last stand on a large rock and await the unseen monsters.

The monsters turn out to be the undead heroes buried in the cairns. After surviving the night both Halli and Aud realize that while the cairns protect them, they also keep their people trapped in the valley. A year later, after making preparations, Aud and Halli leave the valley together to seek adventure in the wider world. The epilogue in the form of a woman telling Halli's tale to children imply they have yet to return.
