= William McGregor (director) =

British screenwriter and director (born 1987)

William McGregor (born 26 September 1987) is a British screenwriter and director of BAFTA award winning film and television and Cannes Lion award winning commercials.

== Career ==
McGregor studied at University for the Creative Arts in Farnham where he made his 2009 student film, Who's Afraid of the Water Sprite? and won the Royal Television Society Award for Best Drama; the Cambridge Student Film Festival was renamed "The Watersprite Film Festival" in honour of the film.

McGregor was selected as a Screen International "Star of Tomorrow" in 2012 and a Berlinale Talent Campus participant in 2010. McGregor is represented for drama in the UK by Independent Talent and for commercials by The Mill.

McGregor became the youngest-ever director of E4's BAFTA award-winning drama, Misfits, in 2013, directing the first three episodes of series five. In 2014, he directed the finale of the BBC's Poldark. The final episode was described as "one of those rare occasions when a popular drama series delivers something that properly belongs to art" by The Daily Telegraph.

In 2016 McGregor directed the mini series One of Us, starring Juliet Stevenson and Laura Fraser. The four part miniseries was produced by the BBC and Netflix. The series received the highest number of nominations for any television production at the 2017 Scottish Royal Television Society Awards, and actress Juliet Stevenson received a Scottish BAFTA nomination for her work on the show.

In 2019 William directed the This World storyline for the first series of His Dark Materials.

== Feature films ==
McGregor's BAFTA winning debut feature film, Gwen, produced by Hilary Bevan Jones, premièred at the Toronto International Film Festival in 2018.

After the Toronto International Film Festival premiere Gwen was picked up for distribution in the US and internationally. McGregor also signed to the Creative Artists Agency for representation in the US.

The film became one of the Toronto International Film Festival buzz titles drawing praise for its folk horror roots and unnerving tone.

== Awards ==
- Nominated - Best British Film at the Edinburgh International Film Festival 2019 for Gwen (2019 film)
- Won - Jury Prize at the Riviera International Film Festival 2019 for Gwen (2019 film)
- Won – Best International Mini-series Sichuan TV Festival for Poldark
- Nominated – Best Directing for a Mini-Series or Motion Picture Made Television Sichuan TV Festival for Poldark
- Nominated – Best Drama National Television Awards for Poldark
- Nominated – Best Newcomer Rushes Soho Shorts Festival for Bovine
- Won – Coca-Cola Cinemagic Young Filmmaker of the Year 2010 for Who's Afraid of the Water Sprite?
- Won – Coca-Cola Cinemagic Innovation Award for The Little
- Nominated – National Film Festival for Talented Youth "New Talent Award" for The Little
- Won – Best Drama Royal Television Society Award for Who's Afraid of the Water Sprite?
- Nominated – Best Short Warsaw Film Festival for Who's Afraid of the Water Sprite?
- Nominated – Best Student Film The European Independent Film Festival for Who's Afraid of the Water Sprite?
- Won – Cambridge Student Film Festival "Film of the Year" for Who's Afraid of the Water Sprite?
- Won – Cambridge Student Film Festival "Best Direction" for Who's Afraid of the Water Sprite?
- Won – Cambridge Student Film Festival "Technical Achievement" for Who's Afraid of the Water Sprite?
- Won – National Student Film Festival "Technical Achievement" for Who's Afraid of the Water Sprite?
- Won – National Student Film Festival "Best Cinematography" for Who's Afraid of the Water Sprite?
- Won – National Student Film Festival "Best Horror" for Who's Afraid of the Water Sprite?
- Won – Exposures "Best Cinematography" for Who's Afraid of the Water Sprite?
- Nominated – National Young Filmmaker Award for Follow the Scent
- Nominated – BAFTA 60 Seconds of Fame

== Filmography ==
=== Short films ===
- Follow the Scent (2006)
- Who's Afraid of the Water Sprite? (2009)
- Bovine (2010)
- The Little (2010)
- The Puppeteer (2010)
- Eradicate (2011)
- No Escape (2012)

=== Feature films ===
- Gwen (2018)

=== Television ===
- Misfits – Series 5, Episodes 1, 2, 3
- Poldark – Series 1, Episodes 5, 6, 7, 8
- One of Us – Series 1, Episodes 1, 2, 3, 4
- His Dark Materials – Series 1, 'This World', Episodes 2, 3, 4, 6, 7, 8
- Lockwood & Co. – Series 1, Episodes 2, 3, 4

=== Commercials ===
- Harry Potter – Wizzards Unite
- Pepsi – Get Hyped for Half Time
- Ford Fusion – Change
- Google – Hangout
- Google – Front Row
- Freddy – Snake
- SEGA – Rome2: Total War
- Boots – Summer
- Barclays – Help
