= Buried Fire =

1999 novel by Jonathan Stroud

- Author: Jonathan Stroud
- Cover artist: Greg Call (US edition)
- Language: English
- Genre: Fantasy, Young Adult
- Publisher: The Bodley Head (UK); Hyperion/Miramax (USA)
- Publication date: 1999
- Media type: Hardcover, Paperback, Kindle
- Pages: 336
- ISBN: 0-7868-5194-5

Buried Fire is a fantasy novel by Jonathan Stroud first published in 1999 by The Bodley Head. It was initially part of the Fire Chronicles, but later the series was disbanded by the publisher. It was supposed to be called The Four Gifts.

== Development ==
The working title for the novel was The Four Gifts.
