= Jonathan Stroud =

British author

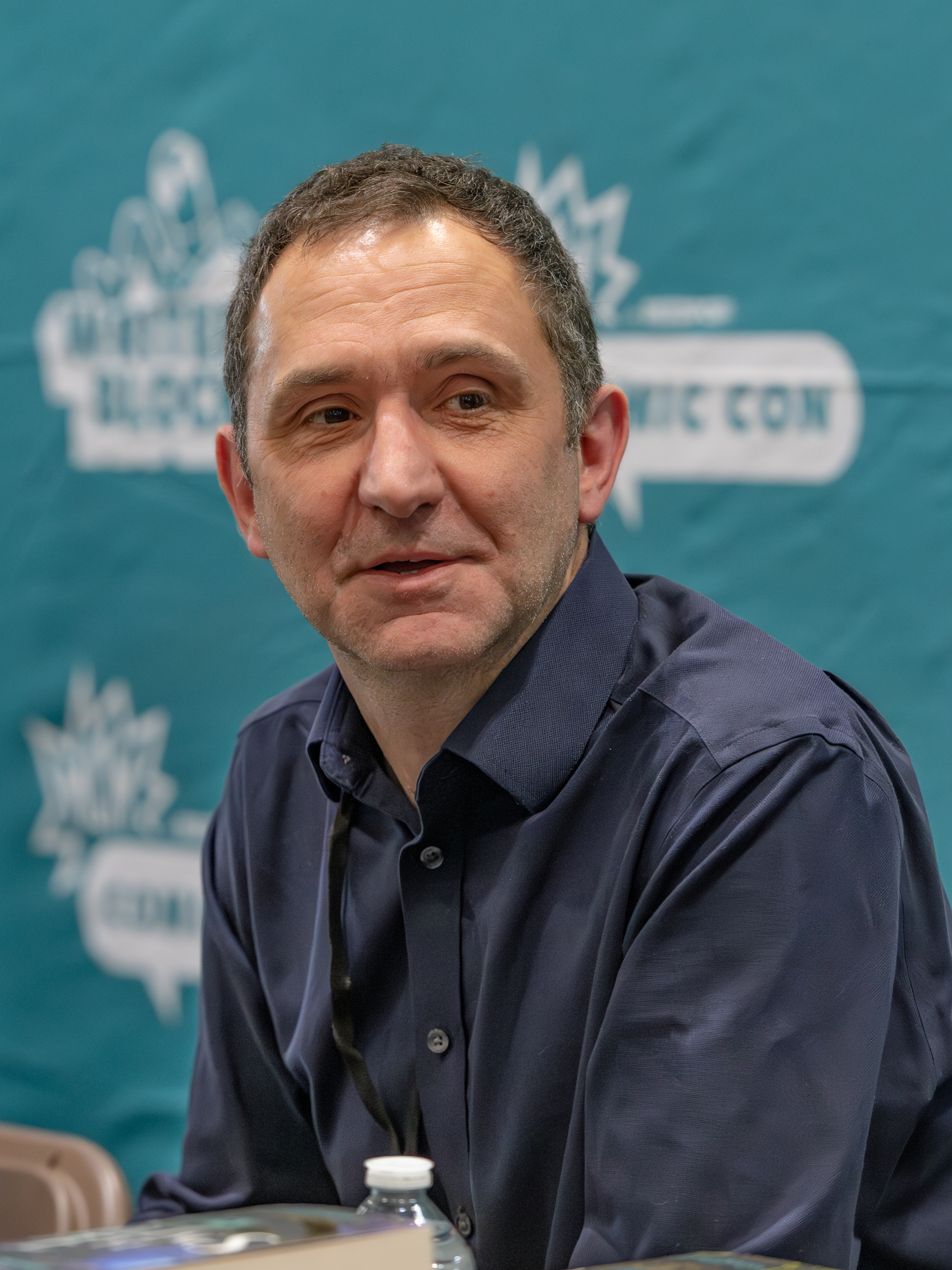
- At MCM London Comic Con, May 2025
- Born: 27 October 1970 (age 56); Bedford, England
- Education: Vanbrugh College, York
- Occupation: Writer
- Writing career
- Period: 1999–present
- Genre: Children's fantasy
- Website: www.jonathanstroud.com

Jonathan Anthony Stroud (born 27 October 1970) is a British writer of fantasy fiction, best known for the Bartimaeus young adult sequence and Lockwood & Co. children's series. His books have received note for their satire, and use of magic to reflect themes of class struggle. The Bartimaeus sequence is the recipient of the Grand Prix de l'Imaginaire and Mythopoeic Fantasy Awards. Stroud's works have also been featured on ALA Notable lists of books for children and young adults. In 2020, Netflix announced a TV series based on Lockwood & Co., with filming initiated in July 2021. In May 2023, the series was canceled after one season.

== Biography and career ==
Born in 1970 in Bedford, England, Stroud began to write stories at a very young age. He grew up in St Albans where he attended Wheatfields Junior School and St Albans Boys' School. He enjoyed reading books, drawing pictures, and writing stories. He attributes his love of reading and writing to being ill between the ages of seven and nine. To escape boredom, he would occupy himself with books and stories. He studied of English literature at the University of York where he was a member of Vanbrugh College, after which he worked in London as an editor for publishers Walker Books. During the 1990s, he started publishing his own works and quickly gained success.

Among his works are the best-selling Bartimaeus Trilogy, which has received note for its satire and use of magic to explore themes of class struggle. By narrating the story from the perspective of Bartimaeus, a sarcastic and slightly egomaniacal djinni, Stroud examines the stereotypes and ethics of the magician class and the enslaved demons. The books in this series, his first to be published in the United States, are The Amulet of Samarkand, The Golem's Eye, Ptolemy's Gate, and prequel The Ring of Solomon.

In 2013, the first book in the Lockwood & Co (which is about a ghost hunter agency in a ghost-ravaged England) series, Lockwood & Co.: The Screaming Staircase was released, and achieved critical acclaim, with Rick Riordan calling Stroud a "genius". The second book, The Whispering Skull, was released in September 2014. A third novel, titled The Hollow Boy, was announced through a competition orchestrated by Stroud, asking readers to send in an idea for a ghost to feature in the third story. The fourth book, The Creeping Shadow, was published in 2016, and the last book in the series, The Empty Grave, was published in 2017.

In late 2020, Netflix announced that Stroud's Lockwood & Co. series would be made into a television show produced by Nira Park, Rachael Prior, and Joe Cornish. Filming began in July 2021 in London.

His newest series, The Outlaws Scarlett and Browne, which currently consists of three books, is about two outlaws and their infamous heists.

== Personal life ==
Stroud lives in St Albans, Hertfordshire, with his wife Gina and their three children.

== Bibliography ==
=== Fiction (Solo) ===
==== Children's literature ====
Title	Publisher	Date	Genre	Length	ISBN
The Viking Saga of Harri Bristlebeard	Walker Books	1 September 1997	Children's fiction, puzzle book	32 pages (hardcover)	978-0-7636-0270-3
The Hare and the Tortoise	Walker Books	5 October 1998	Children's fiction, sticker book	n/a	978-1-4063-0295-0
Walking Through the Jungle	Walker Books	1 January 1998	Children's fiction, sticker book	n/a	978-1-4063-0300-1
Little Red Car	Walker Books	2 August 1999	Children's fiction	15 pages (UK paperback)	978-0-7445-2951-7
Alfie's Big Adventure	Walker Books	2 August 1999	Children's fiction	14 pages (UK paperback)	978-0-7445-2948-7
Little Spike and Long Tail	Walker Books	3 January 2000	Children's literature, puzzle book	n/a	978-0-7445-2964-7
Goldilocks and the Three Bears	Walker Books	2000	Children's literature, puzzle book	15 pages (UK paperback)	978-0-7445-6554-6
The Leap	Red Fox	1 January 2001	Children's literature	192 pages (UK paperback)	978-0-09-940285-5
The Lost Treasure of Captain Blood	Walker Books	1 January 2006	Children's literature, puzzle book	32 pages (UK paperback)	978-1-84428-767-3

==== Novella ====
Title	Publisher	Date	Genre	Length	ISBN
The Ghost of Shadow Vale	Barrington Stoke	1 January 2009	Teen and YA, fantasy	64 (paperback)	978-1-84299-705-5

==== Teen and YA ====
Title	Publisher	Date	Genre	Length	ISBN
Buried Fire	Gardners Books	3 April 2003	Teen and YA, science fiction/fantasy	304 (UK paperback)	978-0-552-54933-2
The Last Siege	Gardners Books	31 January 2004	Teen and YA	261 pages (UK paperback)	978-0-552-55146-5
Heroes of the Valley	Hyperion Books	29 January 2009	Teen & YA, fantasy	496 pages (UK hardcover)	978-1-4231-0966-2

Heroes of the Valley was featured on the VOYA Magazine's Perfect Tens list in 2009.

=== Non-fiction ===
Title	Publisher	Date	Genre	Length	ISBN
Justin Credible's Word Play World	Walker Books	1994	Puzzle book	n/a	0-00-000000-0
Ancient Rome: A Guide to the Glory of Imperial Rome	Kingfisher	15 April 2000	Children's history book	30 pages (UK hardcover)	978-0-7534-5235-6
Life and Times in Ancient Rome	Kingfisher	3 September 2007	Children's history book	30 pages (UK hardcover)	978-1-4352-7505-8

=== Fiction (YA series) ===
==== Bartimaeus Sequence ====
No.	Title	Publisher	Date	Length	ISBN
2	The Amulet of Samarkand	Doubleday	1 October 2003	272 pages (UK hardcover)	978-0-385-60599-1
3	The Golem's Eye	Gardners Books	30 September 2004	570 pages (UK hardcover)	978-0-385-60615-8
4	Ptolemy's Gate	Doubleday	1 January 2005	528 pages (UK paperback)	978-0-385-60868-8
1	The Ring of Solomon	Doubleday	14 October 2010	528 pages (UK paperback)	978-0-385-61915-8

The Amulet of Samarkand was given a starred review by Booklist and Publishers Weekly in 2003, recommended on Texas Lone Star's YA reading list in 2005, and given commendation for Great Graphic Novels for Teens in 2011.

==== Lockwood & Co. ====
No.	Title	Publisher	Date	Length	ISBN
1	The Screaming Staircase	Corgi Books	3 July 2014	480 pages (UK paperback)	978-0-552-56678-0
2	The Whispering Skull	Corgi Books	25 February 2015	496 pages (UK paperback)	978-0-552-56805-0
2.5	The Dagger in the Desk	Penguin Books	9 February 2015	35 pages (Penguin eBook)	978-1-4481-9694-4
3	The Hollow Boy	Corgi Books	24 September 2015	448 pages (UK paperback)	978-0-552-57314-6
4	The Creeping Shadow	Corgi Books	15 September 2016	560 pages (UK paperback)	978-0-552-57315-3
5	The Empty Grave	Corgi Books	21 September 2017	560 pages (UK paperback)	978-0-552-57579-9

The Screaming Staircase has been recommended by Capitol Choices: Noteworthy Books for Children and Teens (audiobook) and Children and Teens (ten to fourteen) (2014); Texas Lone Star Reading List (2014); Cooperative Children's Book Center (2014); Look! Hoo's Reading (2014), and Amazing Audiobooks for Young Adults (2014). The Whispering Skull was selected by the CCBC Choices (2015) and the Junior Library Guild (2015) and was given a starred review by Booklist (2014), Kirkus (2014), and School Library Journal (2014). The Hollow Boy was selected by the CCBC Choices (2016) and the Junior Library Guild (2016) and was given a starred review by Booklist (2015) and School Library Journal (2015). The Creeping Shadow was given a starred review by Booklist (2016) and was selected by the Junior Library Guild as their mystery/adventure novel of 2017. The Empty Grave was given a starred review by Booklist in 2017.

==== The Outlaws Scarlett and Browne ====
No.	Title	Publisher	Date	Length	ISBN
1	The Outlaws Scarlett and Browne	Walker Books	5 October 2021	421 pages (hardcover)	978-1-4063-9481-8
2	The Notorious Scarlett and Browne	Walker Books	7 July 2022	432 pages (paperback)	978-1-4063-9482-5
3	The Legendary Scarlett and Browne	Walker Books	18 February 2025	448 pages (hardcover)	978-0-5937-0736-4

== Awards and honours ==
=== Bartimaeus sequence ===
Book	Year	Award name	Award Body	Result	Ref.
The Amulet of Samarkand	2004	Best Books for Young Adults	American Library Association	Top Ten	
The Amulet of Samarkand	2004	Notable Children's Books	American Library Association	Won	
The Amulet of Samarkand	2004	Boston Globe–Horn Book Award	The Boston Globe and The Horn Book Magazine	Honor book	
The Amulet of Samarkand	2004	Locus Award (YA)	Locus	Nominated	
The Amulet of Samarkand	2004	Selected Audiobooks for Young Adults	American Library Association	Won	
The Amulet of Samarkand	2005	Nevada Young Readers' Award (YA)	Nevada Library Association	Nominated	
The Amulet of Samarkand	2005	Deutscher Jugendliteraturpreis for Jugendbuch		Nominated	
The Amulet of Samarkand	2006	Evergreen Teen Book Award	Washington Young Adult Review Group	Nominated	
The Amulet of Samarkand	2006	Georgia Peach Book Award for Teen Readers	Georgia Library Association	Nominated	
The Amulet of Samarkand	2007	Indian Paintbrush Book Award (Grades 4-6)	Wyoming Library Association	Nominated	
The Golem's Eye	2005	Selected Audiobooks for Young Adults	American Library Association	Won	
The Golem's Eye	2005	Best Books for Young Adults	American Library Association	Won	
The Golem's Eye	2005	Locus Award (YA)	Locus	Nominated	
The Golem's Eye	2007	Colorado Blue Spruce Award (YA)	Colorado Blue Spruce Young Adult Book Awards	Nominated	
Ptolemy's Gate	2006	Cybils Award (Speculative Fiction)	Cybils Awards	Won	
Ptolemy's Gate	2006	Locus Award for Best Young Adult Novel	Locus	Nominated	
Ptolemy's Gate	2006	Corine International Book Prize	Börsenverein des Deutschen Buchhandels	Won	
Ptolemy's Gate	2007	Selected Audiobooks for Young Adults	American Library Association	Won	
Ptolemy's Gate	2007	Notable Children's Recordings	American Library Association	Won	
Bartimaeus trilogy (books 1–3)	2006	Mythopoeic Fantasy Award for Children's Literature	Mythopoeic Society	Won	
Bartimaeus trilogy (books 1–3)	2007	Grand Prix de l'Imaginaire (Youth Novel)	Utopiales	Won	
The Ring of Solomon	2010	Costa Children's Book Award	Costa Coffee	Nominated	
The Ring of Solomon	2010	Der Leserpreis (The Reader's Award)	Lovelybooks.de	Shortlisted	
The Ring of Solomon	2012	Amazing Audiobooks for Young Adults	American Library Association	Won	

=== Lockwood & Co. ===
Book	Year	Award name	Award Body	Result	Ref.
The Screaming Staircase	2013	Cybils Award (Speculative Fiction)	Cybils Awards	Won	
The Screaming Staircase	2013	Goodreads Choice Award (Middle Grade & Children's)	Goodreads	Nominated	
The Screaming Staircase	2014	Los Angeles Times Book Prize	Los Angeles Times	Finalist	
The Screaming Staircase	2014	Edgar Awards (Best Juvenile)	Mystery Writers of America	Nominated	
The Screaming Staircase	2014	WeRead Prize	Jewish Community Secondary School	Won	
The Screaming Staircase	2014	Booktrust Best Book Awards (9-11 Best Story)	BookTrust and Amazon Kindle	Shortlisted	
The Screaming Staircase	2014	North Carolina Young Adult Book Award		Nominated	
The Screaming Staircase	2014	Carnegie Medal	CILIP	Nominated	
The Screaming Staircase	2014	Worcestershire Teen Book Award	Worcestershire Public Libraries	Shortlisted	
The Screaming Staircase	2014	Silver Inky Award	Inside a Dog	Shortlisted	
The Screaming Staircase	2015	Sakura Medal	International Librarians of Japan	Nominated	
The Screaming Staircase	2015	Warwickshire Secondary Book Awards	Stratford Girls' Grammar School	Won	
The Screaming Staircase	2015	Coventry Inspiration Book Awards	Coventry City Council	Shortlisted	
The Screaming Staircase	2015	UKYA Blogger Awards	UKYA Blogger Awards	Nominated	
The Screaming Staircase	2015	The Weald Book Award	The Weald School	Shortlisted	
The Screaming Staircase	2015	Popular Paperbacks for Young Adults	American Library Association	Won	
The Screaming Staircase	2016	Beehive Book Awards (Young Adult Fiction)	Children's Literature Association of Utah	Nominated	
The Screaming Staircase	2016	Nevada Young Readers' Award (Intermediate)	Nevada Library Association	Won	
The Screaming Staircase	2016	Sasquatch Award	Washington Library Association	Nominated	
The Screaming Staircase	2017	Rebecca Caudill Young Readers' Book Award	Rebecca Caudhill	Nominated	
The Whispering Skull	2014	Goodreads Choice Award (Middle Grade & Children's)	Goodreads	Nominated	
The Whispering Skull	2015	Amazing Audiobooks for Young Adults	American Library Association	Top 30	
The Hollow Boy	2015	Goodreads Choice Award (Middle Grade & Children's)	Goodreads	Nominated	
The Creeping Shadow	2016	Goodreads Choice Award (Middle Grade & Children's)	Goodreads	Nominated	
The Empty Grave	2017	Goodreads Choice Awards (Middle Grade & Children's)	Goodreads	Nominated	
The Empty Grave	2017	Booklist Editor's Choice for Youth	Booklist	Won	
The Empty Grave	2019	Carnegie Medal	CILIP	Nominated	

=== Other works ===
Book	Year	Award name	Award Body	Result	Ref.
Heroes of the Valley	2009	Premio El Templo de las Mil Puertas for Mejor novela extranjera independiente		Nominated	
Heroes of the Valley	2010	Locus Award (YA)	Locus	Nominated	
Heroes of the Valley	2010	Best Books for Young Adults	American Library Association	Won	
Heroes of the Valley	2010	Carnegie Medal in Literature	CILIP	Nominated	
Heroes of the Valley	2011	Premio El Templo de las Mil Puertas for Mejor novela extranjera perteneciente a saga		Nominated	
