= David W. Heron =

American librarian

Heron in 1974

David Winston Heron (March 29, 1920 – January 8, 2009) was an American librarian.

== Early life and education ==
Heron was born March 29, 1920. He attended Pomona College, graduating in 1942, and subsequently served in the U.S. Army Infantry in Europe during World War II. He obtained a Bachelor of Library Science degree from the University of California, Berkeley in 1948 and a Master of Library Science degree from the University of California, Los Angeles in 1951.

== Career ==
Heron worked at several libraries in his early career, including at the University of California, Los Angeles, the American Embassy in Tokyo, Japan, Stanford University, the Hoover Institution, and the University of the Ryukyus.

In 1961, he became the director of libraries at the University of Nevada, Reno. He also served as the president of the Nevada Library Association from 1964 to 1966.

In 1968, he moved to the University of Kansas at Lawrence to serve as its director of libraries. In 1974, he moved again to become the university librarian of the University of California, Santa Cruz, a position he retained until his retirement.
