= Billy Twelvetrees =

British Lions & England international rugby union player

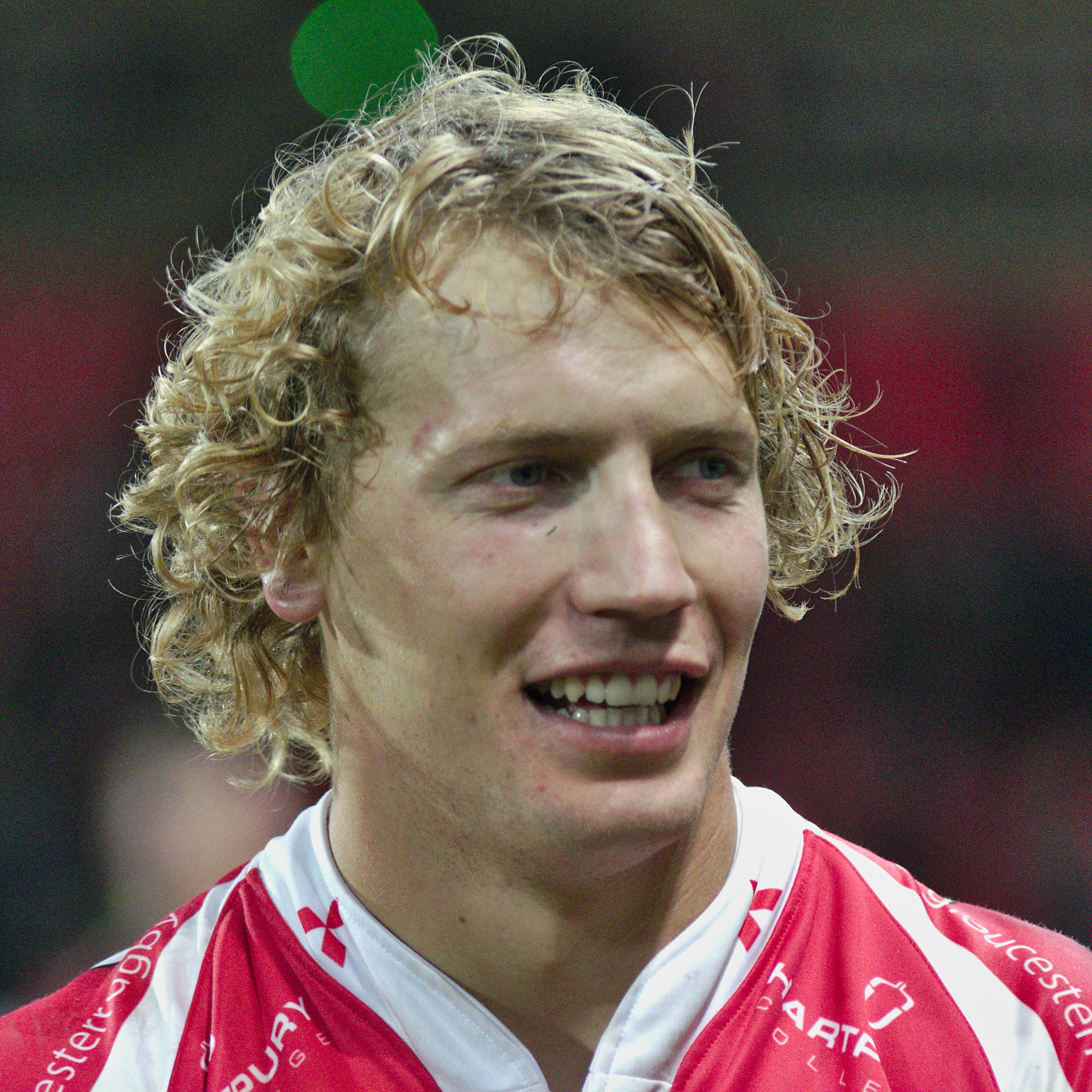
- Born: William Wesley Twelvetrees; 15 November 1988 (age 37) Chichester, England
- Height: 1.93 m (6 ft 4 in)
- Weight: 103 kg (227 lb; 16 st 3 lb)
- School: The Weald School, Billingshurst

Rugby union career
- Position: Centre/Fly-Half
Amateur team(s)
Years	Team	Apps	(Points)
2006–2008	Leicester Lions		
Senior career
Years	Team	Apps	(Points)
2008–2009	Bedford Blues	31	(161)
2009–2012	Leicester Tigers	46	(301)
2012–2023	Gloucester Rugby	252	(927)
2023–2024	Ealing Trailfinders	17	(68)
2025–	Worcester Warriors	9	(15)
- Correct as of 25 May 2024
International career
Years	Team	Apps	(Points)
2013–2015	England	22	(15)
- Correct as of 21 March 2015

William Wesley Twelvetrees (born 15 November 1988) is a rugby union footballer who plays centre or fly-half for Worcester Warriors. He formerly played as inside centre for the England national team.

Whilst playing for the Leicester Tigers, Twelvetrees was nicknamed '36' based on the Irish-accented pronunciation of twelvetrees by club captain Geordan Murphy, which sounded like "twelve threes", or 36.

== Early life ==
Twelvetrees grew up in Wisborough Green, West Sussex. He is the son of Kevin Twelvetrees, a tree surgeon, and Beverley Twelvetrees. He attended Wisborough Green Primary School and later The Weald Secondary School in Billingshurst. He is the youngest of four brothers who were all encouraged to play rugby by their mother, Beverley, with his older brothers Jonathan and twins Matthew and Joseph providing suitable competition.

Growing up, Twelvetrees was active in a range of sports including football and cricket. During his youth he spent his summer weekends playing for Wisborough Green Cricket Club where he was proficient with the bat: "Billy’s still got the biggest hit for Wisborough Green Cricket Club. From the most distant wicket he cleared the pavilion with a six."

Twelvetrees spent his youth at a succession of Sussex rugby clubs, including a spell at Haywards Heath in the same side as Joe Marler but it was a family friend (a part-owner of Leicester Lions) who would provide Twelvetrees with his first foray into professional rugby. While Twelvetrees was with the Lions, a coach there put him in touch with the-then Leicester Tigers academy manager, Andy Key, and after playing summer sevens by way of a trial, he was taken on.

He also received regular mentoring from expert players who suggested moving him to inside centre from fly-half. This move would prove very fortuitous as his versatility led to more game time. Focusing on his passing game to compliment his natural physicality was a big priority at this time which made him a huge asset in the midfield, where he was regularly deployed as a second playmaker. Twelvetrees has remarked that this was imperative to him becoming a professional.

== Club career ==
As a junior, Twelvetrees played for Pulborough, Horsham and Haywards Heath. He joined the Leicester Tigers academy from Leicester Lions in 2007, and moved to Bedford Blues for the 2008–09 season. After an outstanding season for Bedford, in which he scored 18 tries, 16 conversions and 13 penalties, he re-signed for Tigers in 2009.

He made his first appearance for Leicester in the Heineken Cup on 11 October, filling in for Dan Hipkiss, who was ruled out just prior to kick-off. Despite making his debut with just 10-minutes' notice, he won Man of the Match, scoring a try in a 14-point haul. Unfortunately, he was injured in his next match and ruled out for a large part of the season. He went on to make just six appearances in 2009–10, scoring four tries.

In the opening games of the 2010–11 season, Leicester lost Toby Flood, Jeremy Staunton and George Ford to injury and Twelvetrees was again thrust into the starting line-up, this time at fly-half.

On 28 January 2012, Twelvetrees signed a two-year deal to move from Leicester Tigers to play for Gloucester Rugby. However, on 27 September 2013, Twelvetrees signed a two-year contract extension to stay with Gloucester until the end of the 2015–16 season. On 15 August 2014, Twelvetrees was named new club captain for Gloucester for the 2014–15 season. In September 2017, he was awarded 'Try of the Week' for his week 4 try against Worcester Warriors.

In October 2021, Twelvetrees was awarded a testimonial year in honour of his 10th season with the club

On 27 April 2023, after 12 seasons at Gloucester, it was announced that Twelvetrees would join ambitious club Ealing Trailfinders in the RFU Championship for the 2023–24 season. On 13 May 2024, Trailfinders became winners of the RFU Championship league for the 2023–24 season.

On 28 June 2024, Twelvetrees announced his retirement from professional rugby at the end of the season.

On 19 July 2024, following his retirement, Twelvetrees returned to Gloucester as a backs and attack coach for Championship side Hartpury University.

In June 2025, Twelvetrees came out of retirement to join Worcester Warriors as a player-coach

== International career ==
He was called up for the second string national side, England Saxons, in 2011.

A year later after leaving Leicester for Gloucester Twelvetrees was handed his first full international cap by Stuart Lancaster for England's Calcutta Cup clash with Scotland at Twickenham, scoring a try on his debut. On 12 June 2013, following an impressive performance against Argentina, Twelvetrees was called up to the British & Irish Lions tour of Australia due to concerns about possible injuries sustained by the fly halves and centres prior to the tests.

=== International tries ===
As of 7 July 2019

Try	Opposing team	Location	Venue	Competition	Date	Result	Score
1	Scotland	London, England	Twickenham Stadium	2013 Six Nations	2 February 2013	Win	38 – 18
2	Argentina	Salta, Argentina	Estadio Padre Ernesto Martearena	2013 Summer Internationals	8 June 2013	Win	32 – 3
3	Argentina	London, England	Twickenham Stadium	2013 Autumn Internationals	9 November 2013	Win	31 – 12
