= The Leap (novel) =

2001 novel by Jonathan Stroud

- UK edition cover art of The Leap
- Author: Jonathan Stroud
- Language: English
- Genre: Fantasy novel
- Publisher: Random House
- Publication date: 2001
- Publication place: United Kingdom
- Media type: Print (Paperback)
- Pages: 233 pp
- ISBN: 0-09-940285-8
- OCLC: 59581488

The Leap is a fantasy novel by Jonathan Stroud, published in 2001. It centres on a girl whose best friend drowns in a mill pool.

== Plot introduction ==
Everyone says that Max has drowned, but Charlie thinks differently: she was in the mill-pool with him, and knows exactly what she saw. When she begins to see him in her dreams, her hopes are raised. It seems the reunion she craves is possible. But where exactly is Max leading her? And will she be able to return?

== Defining attributes in The Leap ==
The story weaves a fantasy into everyday life, but for the most part it is confined to Charlie's dreams (and later, her perception of the waking world). With only a few clues, the reader is kept guessing whether it is all in Charlie's imagination, or whether there is a reality behind the dream. No simple answer is given, even at the end.

After the high adventures of Buried Fire, I was interested in a more low-key and subtle investigation of how fantasy and reality collide. The book is split between the perspectives of Charlie, who believes something strange has happened, and her brother James, who doesn’t. It is up to the reader to decide whose side to take. - Jonathan Stroud

== Characters ==
Charlotte "Charlie" Fetcher

Protagonist. At the beginning of the story, Charlie witnesses the drowning at a mill pool of her best friend, Max. Her memories of the events are fanciful, involving a vision of Max in the water, being kidnapped by strange women with bright green eyes. Her doctor, Peter Andover, believes these memories are the cause of asphyxiation (from being under water), for the restriction of blood to the brain may induce visual disturbance, such as prolonged dreamlike hallucinations. Her mother and James, her brother are also skeptic of her tale. In spite of this Charlie continues to fully believe what she had seen. Charlie also has vivid dreams in a fantastic land, where she attempts to find Max. At times she will see him walking in the distance, but is always to far off to catch up with. She keeps a dream journal.

After many nights of trying to find Max, Charlie meets in one of her dreams a stranger named Kit who wants to help her in her quest to find Max. He tells Charlie that Max is what is known in this country as a Walker and that all the Walkers are going to The Great Fair, which celebrates the coming of winter. At The Great Fair there is a Great Dance that welcomes newcomers like Max. Kit then tells Charlie that if Max were to join the dance he would truly be of this country and will forget not only Charlie, but all of his past life. He tells her that there are also many entrances to his country, through dreams (Such as Charlie's) and "true" entrances, like the mill pool, and the only way to catch up to Max was by searching for entrances in the day (when Charlie is awake). These entrances are the places Max once loved since he is still close to his "old country".

Following more dreams, Charlie finally makes it to the fair by sleepwalking. She makes it to the Great Dance but it had already started. She can occasionally see Max amongst the other dancers. When Charlie realizes she is now lost to him, she's devastated. Then Kit emerges from the crowds watching the dance and tells Charlie it isn't too late. She can join Max in the dance since he still remembers her slightly. Kit tells her to take Max's hand and leap, but when she sees Max's emotionless eyes she does not dance, despite Kit's desperate commands to do so. Everyone around her loses their beauty, disintegrate and scream in anger, Kit the loudest amongst them, but now Max has let go of Charlie's hand freed from the dance. He peacefully disappears.

James Fetcher

Charlie's older brother. Through James's eyes the reader is given a look at a more "practical" side of the story. He cares very much for Charlie but worries about her, hoping she isn't going mad. He often annoys Charlie since she thinks he doesn't understand her and her situation. He also once wakes Charlie before she tastes a fruit that would grant her desire, and takes her to Max. From James's view, Charlie was becoming more and more ill in her sleep, her color draining with each second (This could be interpreted as the closer Charlie gets to Max, the closer she gets to death.). Unfortunately, this only worsens things for James. Later, James discovers his sister's dream journal where Charlie writes about her hunt for Max. This only worries James more.

He trails Charlie when she sleepwalks, following her to a quarry and tries to keep her from walking over the edge to her demise. He trips and was unable to reach her, but she stops just in time. Once he finally gets to her she wakes up and speaks his name.

Kit

Kit is a tall, thin man with curly brown hair and green eyes who Charlie befriends in one of her dreams where she searches for Max. He gives her advice in her quest to find Max and at another time finds her a rare fruit that grants desires, which would have helped speed up her search if James hadn't woken her.

Max

Max was Charlie's best friend. He was a very cheerful boy and they spent much time together, all the way up until his fall into the mill pool. Max's departure from Charlie's life was what set the rest of the story in motion, being such an important person in Charlie's psyche.
