= The Golem's Eye =

2004 novel by Jonathan Stroud

- First US edition
- Author: Jonathan Stroud
- Cover artist: Melvyn Grant
- Language: English
- Series: Bartimaeus Sequence
- Release number: 2
- Genre: Children's, fantasy novel
- Publisher: Doubleday (UK); Miramax Books (US)
- Publication date: 1 January 2004
- Publication place: United Kingdom
- Media type: Print (paperback & hardback)
- Pages: 570 pp (first edition, hardcover)
- ISBN: 0-552-55273-9
- OCLC: 224065200
- Preceded by: The Amulet of Samarkand
- Followed by: Ptolemy's Gate

The Golem's Eye is a children's novel of alternate history, fantasy and magic. It is the second book in the Bartimaeus trilogy written by British author Jonathan Stroud. 6 million copies have been sold in 36 countries. It was a New York Times best-seller in 2004.

The book and series are about the power struggles in a magical dystopia centered in London, England featuring a mixture of modern and ancient, secular and mythological themes. The series has been described as a darker, more political and morally complex version of Harry Potter.

The book takes its name from the cyclops-like eye of the golem, a magical artifact that, along with an animating parchment, activates the golem.

== Synopsis ==
Like the rest of the Bartimaeus Trilogy, The Golem's Eye is set in somewhat modern-day London in an alternate history in which magic is commonplace and magicians are an accepted part of society; in fact, most magicians are in positions of power. They comprise the government, and commoners are treated as inferior. The main character is Nathaniel, a magician who works for the government in the Ministry of Internal Affairs. His (unwilling) partner is the wisecracking spirit Bartimaeus. Together they embark on a quest to discover the secret behind the commoners' resistance to magic and the mysterious beast that is stalking the city of London. The beast is revealed to be an invulnerable clay golem created by a coterie of magicians in an attempt to discredit and undermine the government.

== Principal characters ==
Many of the characters have names of biblical persons or historical literary, scientific or political figures, but not in biblical or historical contexts. Most such persons have been transmogrified into members of the elite ruling class of magicians.

=== Spirits ===
- Bartimaeus, a mid-level djinn and servant to Nathaniel
- Queezle, female demon friend of Bartimaeus
- Honorius, an afrit occupying Gladstone's bones, guarding Gladstone's tomb

=== Commoners ===
- Kathleen "Kitty" Jones, a mid-level member of the Resistance
- Terence Pennyfeather, leader of the Resistance
- Jakob Hyrnek, childhood friend of Kitty Jones
- Verroq, a mercenary of great physical strength and stature
- Clem Hopkins, member and betrayer of The Resistance

=== Magicians ===
- Nathaniel (alias John Mandrake), junior magician in the Security Ministry of the government, and chief protagonist
- Henry Duvall, chief of the Night Police and commander of the golem
- Jane Farrar, assistant to chief of police
- Rupert Devereaux, Prime Minister of Britain
- Gladstone, a powerful dead 19th century British magician
- Jessica Whitwell, Minister of Security, Nathaniel's boss
- Quentin Makepeace, a British magician playwright
- Julius Tallow, Minister of Internal Affairs
- Harlequin, a British government spy stationed in Prague
- Kavka, a master Czech magician in Prague, creator of the golem

=== Organisations and unnamed characters ===
- The benefactor (aka Quentin Makepeace) to the Resistance
- The Resistance, an organisation attempting to overthrow the magicians' government
- Magician's Council, the city council of London
- Night Police (werewolves), the main law enforcers of the city

== Magical objects, spells and places ==
- Seven planes, somewhat like 'dimensions': the first plane is that of earthly existence, in which all humans dwell. The higher planes may be inhabited by spirits only, and only spirits can normally see into them. The more powerful the spirit, the higher the plane on which it can exist, and see into. Magicians can see into the first few planes using special devices.
- Staff of Gladstone, casts lightning bolts upon incantation; can destroy even very powerful spirits
- Golem's eye, clay in the form of an eye which when inserted into the forehead of a golem, allows one to see through the eyes of the golem, and control it
- Other place, a kind of dimension invisible and inaccessible to humans, where spirits normally dwell when not enslaved to a magician
- Animation parchment – placed in golem's mouth, in conjunction with a golem's eye, animates a golem
- Golem, a large homunculus made of clay and animated by means of a parchment (spell) and golem's eye. While not strictly a magical object, a golem is created by magic and immune to magical attack. Any such attempt is likely to result in a backlash that injures or kills the attacker
- Vigilance spheres, eyes in the sky used for tracking and spying, though it isn't clear whether these are magical or mechanical objects
- Black Tumbler, a spell that covers victim with smoke and flames, leaving him/her maimed or disfigured
- Seven-League Boots, boots that allow the wearer to take seven-league strides, thereby attaining great speed

== Alternate history ==
The stories (of which this is one of four sequential episodes) are set in an alternate history. The events take place in London, England, and Prague, Czech Republic. Magic has partly displaced technology as a means of social progress. In an incongruent mix of modern and antiquarian technologies, Britain has jets but most of their modern ships are civil-war ironclads.

In the past, the magocratic Holy Roman Empire was the most powerful empire in the world, the greatest threat to Britain, and centered on Prague for centuries; therefore, it was also referred to as the Czech Empire. The Holy Roman Emperor ruled most of Europe and, as opposed to its real-life counterpart, the empire survived another 62 years until the fall of its capital to the British forces under the leadership of the historical British prime minister William Gladstone in 1868, resulting in the rise of London as the new center of magic. Even after more than a century since its demise, the citizens of its heartland (Czechs) remained a threat to the British.

Prussia also remained in existence but was ruled by the British.

Excluding the prologue, the events are set in approximately the current day. The only date reference for the trilogy is in this, the second book, which states that Gladstone has been dead 110 years. Gladstone died in 1898, so the timeframe of the second novel is 2008, and that of the first novel is two years before, i.e., 2006. The books were published in 2003 and 2004, so the author had written a (slightly) future history.

== Plot ==
Two years after the events of the first novel, Nathaniel (alias John Mandrake) serves in London's Ministry of Internal Affairs, working to eliminate the anti-magician Resistance. Under pressure from his superiors, he summons his former servant, the djinn Bartimaeus. Though furious that Nathaniel has broken their bargain – having sworn never to summon him again in return for the djinn never divulging Nathaniel's birth name – Bartimaeus agrees to six weeks of service if he will not be sent to the ongoing North American war.

Meanwhile, commoners Kitty Jones and Jakob Hyrnek are attacked by a magician; Jakob suffers extensive burns while Kitty is unharmed, demonstrating a natural resilience to magic. Denied justice, Kitty is approached by Mr. Pennyfeather, whose wife was killed after rejecting a magician's advances. Convinced to help undermine magicians and their unjust rule, Kitty joins the Resistance, carrying out minor attacks and thefts. During a nighttime heist, she witnesses an enormous creature march through a street of magician-owned businesses, leaving massive damage in its wake and several Night Police officers dead. Believing the Resistance responsible, police begin a crackdown on the city.

Investigating the attack, Bartimaeus reunites with fellow spirit Queezle, who has learned the creature can destroy Spirits. The creature reappears and Queezle is killed; Bartimaeus battles the creature at the British Museum but is knocked out, and it escapes. At a meeting of high-ranking magicians, Bartimaeus reveals that the creature is a golem. Chief of police Henry Duvall insists that the Resistance are responsible, and lobbies the Prime Minister for expanded powers.

Mr. Pennyfeather organizes a final daring raid on the tomb of William Gladstone, but inadvertently releases Honorius, a powerful afrit. Trapped inside Gladstone's bones and driven mad, Honorius kills the grave-robbers; Kitty escapes with Gladstone's staff, and Honorius vows to hunt her down.

Nathaniel and Bartimaeus are sent to Prague, where the last-known golem appeared over a century ago. They find Kavka, the magician who created the golem with the aid of a high-ranking mole in the British government. Nathaniel promises Kavka, whose children are being held in a British prison, that his family will be freed if he helps unmask the traitor. A bearded mercenary – whom Nathaniel and Bartimaeus faced before – arrives, demanding the enchanted parchment to animate the golem. In the ensuing struggle, the parchment is destroyed, leaving no proof of the golem.

Nathaniel returns to find London in panic at Honorius’ rampage. Nathaniel discovers Kitty's involvement, but she evades him. Bartimaeus forces Honorius into the Thames, seemingly defeating him. The magician Quentin Makepeace meets Nathaniel in secret with information on the Resistance. Bartimaeus captures Jakob to lure Kitty into a sting, but she is attacked by the Night Police werewolves. Nathaniel sends Bartimaeus to Kitty's rescue and is arrested. Abandoned by his superiors, he makes a desperate appeal to the Prime Minister.

Laying low, Bartimaeus and Kitty debate their shared oppression by magicians. Bartimaeus, in the form of his favorite master Ptolemy, details the rise and fall of magical empires that history seems doomed to repeat, forever enslaving spirits to magicians; Kitty is struck by the similarity in magicians’ treatment of commoners.

Released by the Prime Minister, Nathaniel brings Jakob to Kitty and offers freedom in exchange for Gladstone's staff. Honorius reappears but is distracted by the arrival of the golem. Honorius is destroyed, and Nathaniel manages to unlock the staff's power but is knocked unconscious. Kitty risks her life to remove the animating parchment, immobilizing the golem. Bartimaeus allows Kitty and Jakob to escape and tells Nathaniel that Kitty was incinerated by the golem, sacrificing herself to save him. As its spell dissipates, the crumbling golem returns to its master, Duvall, who is arrested.

Though doubtful Duvall acted alone, Nathaniel finds his investigation at a close. Before he releases Bartimaeus, the djinn finally calls him "John Mandrake,” which Nathaniel accepts as a sign of respect; Bartimaeus meant to signify the innocent, honorable Nathaniel's full transformation into the ruthless magician. Jakob leaves the country, but Kitty stays to study the history of magic, in search of an end to the cycle of tyranny.

== Awards ==
The Golem's Eye has received the following accolades:

- American Library Association's (ALA) Selected Audiobooks for Young Adults (2005)
- ALA's Best Books for Young Adults (2005)
- Locus Award (YA) Nominee (2005)
- Colorado Blue Spruce Award (YA) (2007)

== See also ==
- The Amulet of Samarkand
- Ptolemy's Gate
- The Ring of Solomon
