= Ptolemy's Gate =

2005 novel by Jonathan Stroud

- First UK edition
- Author: Jonathan Stroud
- Cover artist: David Wyatt
- Language: English
- Series: Bartimaeus Sequence
- Release number: 3
- Genre: Children's, Fantasy novel
- Publisher: Doubleday
- Publication date: September 2005
- Publication place: United Kingdom
- Media type: Print (Paperback & Hardback)
- Pages: 515 pp (first edition, Hardback)
- Preceded by: The Golem's Eye
- Followed by: The Ring of Solomon

Ptolemy's Gate is a young adult novel of alternate history, fantasy and magic. It is the third book and final in the Bartimaeus trilogy, written by British author Jonathan Stroud. It was released in the United Kingdom in September 2005, and in the United States in December of the same year. A prequel, The Ring of Solomon, was released in 2010.

== Setting ==
Set in an alternate version of London, England where magicians represent the ruling class of government, using summoned spirits to exert control over a non-magical populace. The year is approximately 2005, three years after the events of the previous book.

== Plot ==
In a series of flashbacks told throughout the book, the Egyptian magician Ptolemy summons the djinni Bartimaeus in 126 BCE. Uninterested in power or glory, Ptolemy primarily interviews Bartimaeus on the nature of the spirit's home realm (the Other Place) and seeks to write a book to bridge the exploitative gap between humans and djinn. Although initially hesitant, Bartimaeus forms a close relationship with Ptolemy, protecting him from assassins sent by Ptolemy's cousin, the paranoid and arrogant king-in-waiting. In an effort to learn more about djinn and to demonstrate his willingness to trust Bartimaeus, Ptolemy designs and tests Ptolemy's Gate, which allows a human's essence to be summoned in the Other Place, though the experience leaves him severely weakened. Ptolemy's cousin hires magicians from Rome to assassinate Ptolemy with their own vast number of djinn; Bartimaeus attempts to escape with the weakened Ptolemy, but the two are trapped in a catacomb and surrounded. As his final act, Ptolemy dismisses Bartimaeus back to the Other Place before he is killed.

In the present, three years have passed since the magician Nathaniel (known as John Mandrake) helped prevent an attempted coup by Henry Duvall and a mysterious co-conspirator. Now an established member of the British Government, Mandrake is responsible for propaganda efforts to distract British commoners from overseas wars, as well as suppressing growing unrest at home. Bartimaeus, weakened by years of continuous service, is treated poorly by Mandrake, who refuses to dismiss Bartimaeus for fear of another magician finding out his birth name. Meanwhile, former resistance member Kitty Jones studies magic under an independent magician, seeking to break the historical cycle of magicians rising to power, oppressing commoners, and eventually being overthrown.

Bartimaeus is tasked by Mandrake with investigating a conspiracy among low-level members of the government. After tracking the members of the conspiracy (including the mild-mannered librarian Hopkins and the bearded, magically resistant mercenary previously employed by Simon Lovelace and Henry Duvall), Bartimaeus and several other djinn are sent to capture Hopkins for interrogation. They discover that Hopkins has been possessed by the demon Faquarl, who kills the other djinn and traps Bartimaeus, leaving him for dead.

Meanwhile, Mandrake attempts to convince Prime Minister Rupert Deveraux to authorize use of Gladstone's staff, a powerful magical weapon, to assist with the failing war abroad and domestic unrest. Deveraux, having become paranoid and distractible, refuses for fear of being overthrown. Increasingly frustrated and disillusioned, Mandrake locates his art teacher Ms. Lutyens and attempts to thank her for saving him as a child, but is heartbroken when she coldly rebukes him and criticizes the man he has become. Learning that Kitty Jones is alive, he attempts to apprehend her himself, but is interrupted by a summons from influential theatre director Quentin Makepeace, who insists that Kitty join him.

The two discovers the conspiracy was masterminded by Makepeace, who also helped organize Simon Lovelace's and Henry Duvall's attempted coups, and who tasked Hopkins with developing a method of merging humans with spirits. Makepeace and his followers capture the ranking members of government and possess themselves with demons. However, the spirits, on Faquarl's orders, betray and overwhelm their hosts, creating a hybrid army led by the ancient demon Nouda. Mandrake attempts to summon his djinn, but only Bartimaeus appears. Nouda, taking pity on Bartimaeus for his weakened state and long servitude, allows him to be dismissed, and grants his request to spare Mandrake and Kitty.

As London falls under the control of the hybrids, Mandrake and Kitty escape. After learning of Ptolemy's Gate, Kitty journeys to the Other Place and persuades Bartimaeus to return. Bartimaeus and Mandrake form an unprecedented partnership by sharing Mandrake's body, allowing them to wield Gladstone's staff and fight the hybrids as equals rather than master and servant. Together they destroy many of the possessed rebels, including Faquarl. Realizing that the only way to destroy Nouda is to unleash the full power of the Staff, Mandrake dismisses Bartimaeus at the critical moment (mirroring Ptolemy's sacrifice), destroying Nouda and himself in a massive explosion. In the aftermath, Kitty declines a role in the new government and leaves England to recover from the lasting effects of her journey to the Other Place.

== Magical objects, spells and places ==
- Ptolemy's Gate - a kind of reverse summoning, a method that allows a human to enter the 'Other Place' where spirits dwell
- The Staff of Gladsone - a magical wooden staff, used by the famous magician William Gladstone, that contains several incredibly powerful spirits.
- The Amulet of Samarkand - a powerful magical amulet that protects the wearer from magical attacks; previously used by Simon Lovelace in the first book.
- The Other Place - the home dimension from which djinn are summoned; a boundless realm of swirling essence where all djinn collectively form one entity and can exist in their natural, formless state.

== Principal characters ==
=== Magicians ===
- Nathaniel/John Mandrake
- Ptolemy
- Rupert Deveraux
- Jessica Whitwell
- Jane Farrar
- Quentin Makepeace
- Harold Button
- Sholto Pinn
- Carl Mortensen
- Helen Malbindi
- Clive Jenkins
- Rebecca Piper
- Bruce Collins

=== Commoners ===
- Kitty Jones
- Clem Hopkins
- Nicholas Drew
- George Fox
- Rosanna Lutyens

=== Spirits ===
- Bartimaeus, a fourth level djinni in service to Mandrake
- Ascobol
- Cormocodran
- Mwamba
- Hodge
- Faquarl
- Nouda
- Purip
- Fritang

== Reception ==
Ptolemy's Gate has received the following accolades:

- Starred Kirkus review (2006)
- Starred Booklist review (2006)
- Cybils Award (Speculative Fiction) (2006)
- Locus Award for Best Young Adult Novel (2006)
- Corine Internationaler Buchpreis for Kinder- und Jugendbuch (2006)
- American Library Association's (ALA) Selected Audiobooks for Young Adults (2007)
- ALA's Notable Children's Recordings (2007)
