= Gwen (film) =

- Directed by: William McGregor
- Written by: William McGregor
- Produced by: Hilary Bevan Jones
- Starring: Maxine Peake; Eleanor Worthington Cox
- Cinematography: Adam Etherington
- Edited by: Mark Towns
- Music by: James Edward Barker
- Production company: BFI Endor Productions
- Distributed by: AMC Networks
- Release date: 7 September 2018 (Toronto International Film Festival)
- Running time: 86 minutes
- Country: United Kingdom
- Languages: English; Welsh

Gwen is a 2018 British folk horror film incorporating elements of gothic, supernatural, and psychological horror. It was written and directed by William McGregor. The film premiered at the 2018 Toronto International Film Festival (TIFF), where lead actress Eleanor Worthington Cox received the Festival's Rising Star award. The film is produced by Hilary Bevan Jones.

Following its premiere, Gwen was acquired for distribution in the United States and other international markets.

== Plot ==
In 19th-century North Wales, farm girl Gwen lives with her Mother and younger sister, Mari. While playing outdoors, they pass a neighboring farmhouse where a group of men are tending to some dead bodies who village Doctor Wren claims died of cholera.

The next morning, the family attends church. As they leave, Gwen's mother has a brief conversation with a man. On their return home, they find an animal heart nailed to their front door. The following day, Gwen finds their crops have spoiled. That night, Gwen asks about the man her mother spoke to and if she plans to sell the house, which her mother denies.

Afterward Gwen finds Mother standing in the pasture among their mutilated and killed sheep. Gwen investigates the cholera infected house and sees signs indicating a struggle and finds their sheep were also mutilated. Gwen tells Mother about the similarities to their current situation and is told to stop.

Mother suffers a violent seizure and later at church, another seizure draws the attention of Doctor Wren, who prescribes tonic wine, noting that his practice is owned by the local quarry company. The following day, Gwen sells vegetables at the market and notices the villagers ignoring her or giving her unsettling looks.

Men from the Quarry come to the farm. Gwen eavesdrops on the conversation with Mother and hears them demanding to buy the lands from Mother. Mother sends them away and forces Gwen to butcher their dead horse as punishment for eavesdropping. When Gwen refuses, Mother hacks off the horse's head and has another seizure.

While reading a letter at her mother’s request, Gwen learns that her father will not return home, a fact her mother has concealed. That night, a man approaches the farmhouse with a dagger and Gwen and Mother kill him. Mother orders the girls to flee as the quarry men arrive, overpower her and burn both her and the house.

Gwen and Mari escape into the hills and watch their home burn. Mari asks where they will go and Gwen replies that they will search for their father.

== Cast ==
- Eleanor Worthington Cox as Gwen
- Maxine Peake as Elen
- Richard Harrington as Edward Morris
- Mark Lewis Jones as Mr Wynne
- Kobna Holdbrook-Smith as Doctor Wren
- Christopher Bonford as extra

== Reception ==
Before release, Screen International picked out Gwen as one of the buzz titles from the UK to be seen at the American Film Market of 2018.

Gwen was also featured in the Great8 program at the Cannes Film Festival 2018, a showcase by the British Council of exciting new UK talent.

=== Critical response ===
Critical reception after the film's world premiere at the Toronto International Film Festival was positive. The film became one of the festival's buzz titles, drawing praise for its folk horror roots and unnerving tone.

Review aggregator website Rotten Tomatoes reports an approval rating of 71% based on 62 reviews, with an average rating of 6.6/10. The site's critics' consensus reads: "Gwen's relentlessly grim outlook may wear on some viewers, but it remains a reasonably gripping, solidly assembled descent into atmospheric period horror." Metacritic reports a score of 63 based on 6 critics, indicating "Generally favorable reviews".

Joe Lipsett of Bloody Disgusting gave the film a positive review: "Clever, beautiful and well-acted, Gwen proves to be an unexpected delight. It's a slow burn, but one worth seeking out."
