= The Whispering Skull (novel) =

2015 young adult novel by Jonathan Stroud

- First edition (US)
- Author: Jonathan Stroud
- Language: English
- Series: Lockwood & Co.
- Release number: 2
- Genre: Supernatural, thriller
- Publisher: Corgi Childrens (UK); Disney-Hyperion (US)
- Publication date: 26 February 2015 (UK); 16 September 2014 (US)
- Media type: Paperback
- Pages: 496
- ISBN: 978-0552568050
- Preceded by: The Screaming Staircase
- Followed by: The Hollow Boy
- Website: http://www.lockwoodandco.com/

The Whispering Skull is a young adult thriller novel by Jonathan Stroud. It is the second book in the Lockwood & Co. series. It was released on the 26 February 2015 in the UK by Corgi Children's, and released on September 16, 2014, in the US by Disney-Hyperion. The Whispering Skull was mentioned in an article of The Daily Telegraph twice in March 2015.

== Synopsis ==
After months of not having any cases to solve, Lockwood makes a bet with their rivals, the Fittes agency, and whoever loses has to admit their defeat in the newspaper. Soon after Lockwood & Co. have a customer called Mr. Saunders who wants Lockwood & Co. to come and seal Edmund Bickerstaff's coffin. All goes well until George trips and falls into the coffin releasing a horrible phantom, as well as a powerful Source which kills whoever looks into it. Lockwood and Co. are tasked to retrieve the Source at all cost before it starts wreaking havoc in London.

== Characters ==
- Anthony Lockwood: The charismatic leader of Lockwood & Co. Described as "dashing" and "a little reckless". Has a swift and thorough approach towards solving cases.
- Lucy Carlyle: Third member of Lockwood & Co. and has the ability to communicate with ghosts. Strongly valued within the team for her bravery, Listening and Touch skills.
- George Cubbins: Deputy of Lockwood & Co. Conducts thorough research for the team's upcoming cases as well as the Problem at large; the latter involves experimenting on the Whispering Skull frequently. Lucy has commented that his research skills are often what save them from rushing into a case and dying.
- Whispering Skull: A type 3 ghost. Alternates between sarcasm and death threats (to George) and creating rifts within the team. Was stolen by George who used to work at Fittes, the most prestigious and long-standing agency. Lucy is the only one who can communicate with the skull. The Skull helps Lockwood & Co. solve their cases, albeit grudgingly, but cannot be trusted.
- Quill Kipps: Works at Fittes Agency as a supervisor. Kipps and his team are always trying to beat Lockwood & Co.
- Kat Godwin: On Quill's team. Always has a cold and superior expression. A Listener with good swordplay skills.
- Bobby Vernon: On Quill's team. Has the role of conducting research for the team. Research skills are almost on par, or equal, to George's. Described as very tiny, to the extent that Lockwood commented he would "lose him behind the sofa".

== Reception ==
The Whispering Skull has received the following accolades:

- Kirkus starred review (2014)
- Booklist starred review (2014)
- Goodreads Choice Award (Middle Grade & Children's) nominee (2014)
- American Library Association's Amazing Audiobooks for Young Adults (2015)
