= Bartimaeus Sequence =

Series of four books by Jonathan Stroud (2003–2010)

- The Amulet of Samarkand (2003); The Golem's Eye (2004); Ptolemy's Gate (2005); The Ring of Solomon (2010)
- Author: Jonathan Stroud
- Country: United Kingdom
- Language: English
- Genre: Fantasy
- Publisher: Random House
- Published: 30 September 2003 – 14 October 2010
- Media type: Print

The Bartimaeus Sequence is a series of young adult novels of alternate history, fantasy and magic. It was written by British writer Jonathan Stroud and consists of a trilogy published from 2003 to 2005 and a prequel novel published in 2010. The story follows the career of a teenage magician Nathaniel (aka John Mandrake) and a five-thousand-year-old djinni Bartimaeus, whom he has summoned and nominally controls, through the alternate history of the peak of London's domination as a magical oligarchy.

According to the website for the series, over six million copies of the novels were sold in 36 languages worldwide.

== Setting ==
The series is set in London during the late 1900s or possibly the early 2000s in a parallel universe where trained people can summon demons to do their bidding. Throughout history, various individuals and empires have harnessed these magical forces to obtain great power in the world. The most recent nation to do this is the British Empire (of which London is the capital) that has dominated Europe since the mid-19th century and continues to do so at the time of the story. The UK is a magical oligarchy where a ruling elite of magicians hold almost all the political, economic and cultural power.

The novels are set in an alternate history, with the effects of magic, magicians, and demons having resulted in many changes, but with many countries, cities, events, and people from actual history. In particular these changes are reflected in the contrast between modern aspects (such as electricity, laptops, and cars) and older ones (colonial-era weapons, including muskets). The books incorporate references to various world mythologies and folklore, such as the Arabian Nights and Homer.

== Plot summary ==
=== The Amulet of Samarkand ===
The first book in the trilogy, published 2003, introduces Nathaniel as the gifted 12-year-old apprentice of a middle-aged mid-level magician, Arthur Underwood. He assumes his magician name, John Mandrake, to protect him from rivals who would wish him harm. When the magician Simon Lovelace cruelly humiliates Nathaniel in public, Nathaniel decides to take revenge by stealing Lovelace's most powerful possession, the Amulet of Samarkand, which makes the wearer invulnerable to magic. Unknown to his tutor, he begins the study of advanced magic in order to summon the djinni Bartimaeus and enslave him. Bartimaeus soon overhears Nathaniel's birth-name, which greatly reduces Nathaniel's control over him, because demons can then cast counterspells. Things soon get out of hand and Bartimaeus and Nathaniel find themselves caught in the middle of magical espionage, murder, blackmail, and revolt. Together, the two of them defeat Lovelace and his most powerful demon, Ramuthra, who was last seen destroying an entire nation. These actions end in an uneasy truce between the young magician and Bartimaeus, resulting in the demon returning to whence he came.

=== The Golem's Eye ===
Published in 2004, the second book picks up two years and eight months later and features Nathaniel as a junior magician working his way up the government ranks. In this book Kitty Jones is introduced as an important character. She is a part of the Resistance movement which seeks to end the oppressive rule of the magicians. Nathaniel is tasked by his superiors with crushing the Resistance and capturing its members. His task is complicated by the unexpected appearance of a seemingly invulnerable clay golem that attacks London. Much to the displeasure of Bartimaeus, Nathaniel recalls the djinni to aid him in uncovering the origins of the golem and to save his own skin. In the end, the golem is revealed to have been animated by Henry Duvall, the London Chief of Police.

=== Ptolemy's Gate ===
In the final book of the trilogy, published 2005, Nathaniel is a senior magician and a member of the ruling council, an elite class of magicians in the government. Bartimaeus is still trapped on Earth by Nathaniel and is treated with disdain, continuously weakening as he is not allowed to return to the Other Place. Meanwhile, Kitty Jones has been hiding undercover and completing her research on magic and spirits. She hopes that this will enable her to break the endless cycles of conflicts between djinn and humans. The main plot of this story is a conspiracy to overthrow the government which causes the most dangerous threat in the history of magic. Together, Nathaniel, Bartimaeus and Kitty try to save the city of London from this dangerous threat.

First touched on in The Golem's Eye, the reader learns of the presence of an endless cycle wherein magicians summon spirits, magicians rule over commoners, spirits spread magic throughout a city, some of the commoners gain a resistance to magic, the commoners rebel against the magicians, the magicians are overthrown and the spirits return to the Other Place until another magical empire rises to dominance. This cycle proves to be the main plot, which culminates in the overthrowing of London. Bartimaeus makes references to other magical empires, such as Baghdad, Rome, and Egypt, all of which have fallen from dominance as well.

=== The Ring of Solomon ===
The Ring of Solomon revisits the universe created in the Bartimaeus Trilogy, although the setting shifts from modern London to Jerusalem, 950 BC. It follows the djinni's adventures during the reign of King Solomon, who was frequently referenced in the footnotes during the trilogy. It was released in the United Kingdom on 14 October 2010 and in the U.S. on November 2, 2010. The story revolves around the troubles Bartimaeus faces while enslaved to Solomon's magicians, as he gets caught between the plots of his master to overthrow Solomon, and the schemes of Asmira, captain of the guard of the Queen of Sheba, who was sent by her to assassinate Solomon.

== Adaptations ==
In 2002, Miramax purchased the publishing and screen rights to the series as Harvey Weinstein's replacement for The Lord of the Rings as its fantasy film franchise. While several scripts were made, Weinstein left Miramax with his brother Bob Weinstein to start the Weinstein Company, leaving the films in limbo. In November 2005, a film adaptation of the first book was reported as being in production under director Anthony Minghella. In 2019, Start Media acquired the film and television rights to the four books.

In October 2010, Disney-Hyperion published the first book as a graphic novel written by Jonathan Stroud and Andrew Donkin, with art by Lee Sullivan and colors by Nicolas Chapuis. The first print run was 50,000 in hardcover and 100,000 in paperback.
