= The Weald School =

Location
- Station Road; Billingshurst, West Sussex, RH14 9RY; England; 51°01′00″N 0°27′15″W

Information
- Type: Community school
- Religious affiliation: Christian
- Established: 1967
- Local authority: West Sussex
- Department for Education URN: 126068 Tables
- Ofsted: Reports
- Headteacher: Sarah Edwards
- Gender: Coeducational
- Age: 11 to 18
- Enrolment: 1,786 as of January 2023
- Houses: Thompson, Da Vinci, Blackman, Mercury, Attenborough & Seacole.
- Website: www.theweald.org.uk

The Weald School is a coeducational secondary school and sixth form. It caters for around 1,700 pupils in years 7 to 13, including over 300 in its sixth form. The school opened in 1956, and celebrated its 60th anniversary in the academic year 2016–17.

The school is located in the village of Billingshurst, West Sussex, England. Its grounds adjoin the main road through the village, and is shared with the local leisure facilities at Weald Recreation Centre. On 20 September 2008, the Weald Recreation Centre became the Billingshurst Leisure Centre. The centre is run by Places Leisure (a Places for People subsidiary) on behalf of Horsham District Council.

The Weald admits students from a catchment area, reaching north to the Surrey/Sussex Border, south to Bury, west to Midhurst, and into parts of Horsham.

== History ==
In the mid-2000s, the school held multiple fundraising drives to build brick classrooms for schools in Kenya, replacing mud classrooms that were often washed away. This included raising £50,000 to celebrate the school's 50th year (2006-7 academic year) following a school trip to Kenya in 2006. A further trip to help build the classrooms took place in 2007, and the 2008-9 academic year saw another fundraising push, aiming to raise £30,000 to finish completely re-building Lumuli Primary School.

In December 2008 Mr P May, headteacher since 1998, retired and Peter Woodman became the new Head having left RSA Academy Arrow Vale to take up the post. In December 2020 Peter Woodman retired, leaving Mrs Sarah Edwards (previously deputy Headteacher) as interim head teacher. Mrs Sarah Edwards was appointed headteacher in March 2021.

In 2020, the school announced plans to rename their six houses, formerly Austen, Darwin, Elgar, Livingstone and Wilberforce, "to make them more representative of gender, ethnicity and sexuality/gender identity". There had been plans to rename one of the houses after JK Rowling, but she was replaced by Malorie Blackman due to her controversial views. The houses are now Attenborough, Blackman, DaVinci, Mercury, Seacole and Thompson.

== Notable alumni ==
- James Tilley, association footballer
- Billy Twelvetrees, rugby union footballer
