= The Amulet of Samarkand =

2003 novel by Jonathan Stroud

- Original cover
- Author: Jonathan Stroud
- Language: English
- Series: Bartimaeus Sequence
- Release number: 1
- Genre: Children's, Fantasy novel
- Publisher: Doubleday
- Publication date: 30 September 2003
- Publication place: United Kingdom
- Media type: Print (Paperback & Hardback)
- Pages: 462 (first edition, paperback)
- ISBN: 0-7868-1859-X (first edition, paperback)
- OCLC: 52509519
- LC Class: PZ7.S92475 Am 2003
- Followed by: The Golem's Eye

The Amulet of Samarkand is a young adult novel of alternate history, fantasy and magic. It is the first book in the Bartimaeus Sequence written by English author Jonathan Stroud. The first edition (paperback) was published in September 2003 by Doubleday in the United Kingdom. The book and series are about power struggles in a magical dystopia centred in London, England, and feature a mix of current and ancient, secular and mythological themes. The book is named after a magical artifact created in the ancient Central Asian city of Samarkand, around which the story revolves.

== Plot summary ==
In an alternate London where the British Empire dominates the world through control of magic, and commoners are governed by the ruling class of magicians, five-year-old Nathaniel begins an apprenticeship to magician Arthur Underwood, a mid-ranking magician working in the Ministry of Internal Affairs.

At the age of ten, Nathaniel is presented to a gathering of magicians including the formidable Simon Lovelace, who dismisses Nathaniel's talents and humiliates him. Embittered toward Underwood, Nathaniel plots revenge. Through a scrying glass, Nathaniel sees Lovelace receive a package containing the powerful Amulet of Samarkand. Lovelace plans to use the Amulet to seize control of the government.

Days after his twelfth birthday, Nathaniel summons the djinn Bartimaeus and charges him to steal the Amulet. Bartimaeus, ordered to spy on Lovelace, travels to the magician Sholto Pinn's curio shop. He learns the Amulet had been under government protection. Bartimaeus' presence is discovered and he is detained in the Tower of London. Underwood confiscates Nathaniel's summoning paraphernalia, and is called to the Tower to interrogate Bartimaeus.

At the Tower, Bartimaeus is unsuccessfully interrogated by Pinn and Jessica Whitwell, Minister of Security. Bartimaeus escapes and flees, unwittingly leading Lovelace to the Underwood house. Lovelace threatens Underwood and discovers the Amulet in his study. Nathaniel reveals himself as the thief, to which his master encourages Lovelace to kill his apprentice instead of him. Lovelace's spirits destroy the house; the Underwoods perish but Bartimaeus saves Nathaniel.

Nathaniel and Bartimaeus travel to Heddlehem Hall to stop Lovelace's coup. Bartimaeus battles a mysterious bearded mercenary, who displays extraordinary resistance to magic. Nathaniel is discovered by Lovelace and his master Schyler, who offers an ultimatum: to join Lovelace's new order, or die. Nathaniel kills Schyler using magical firework-cubes, and he and Bartimaeus arrive at the conference of magicians. Nathaniel attempts to warn the attendees but Whitwell places him in an impenetrable bubble as Lovelace, shielded by the Amulet, blows an ancient horn to call forth the immense spirit Ramuthra, who destroys the surrounding magicians and spirits. Bartimaeus distracts Lovelace, allowing Nathaniel to seize the Amulet. Ramuthra obliterates Lovelace, and Nathaniel delivers the words of dismissal and breaks the summoning horn. Ramuthra disappears, and Nathaniel presents the Amulet to Prime Minister Rupert Devereaux. Nathaniel becomes the quiet hero of the government. He strikes a bargain with Bartimaeus: in return for keeping Nathaniel's true name a secret, the magician will not summon him again. With Bartimaeus’ grudging respect, Nathaniel unbinds him, beginning a true magician's life under a new master, Jessica Whitwell.

== Awards ==
The Amulet of Samarkand has received the following accolades:

- Booklist starred review (2003)
- American Library Association (ALA) Notable Book (2004)
- Best Books for Young Adults Top Ten Pick (2004)
- Bank Street Best Book of the Year (2004)
- Booklist Top 10 Fantasy Book for Youth (2004)
- Boston Globe–Horn Book Award Honor Book (2004)
- Locus Award for Young Adult Fiction Nominee (2004)
- Selected Audiobooks for Young Adults (2004)
- Nevada Young Readers' Award (YA) Nominee (2005)
- Deutscher Jugendliteraturpreis for Jugendbuch Nominee (2005)
- Evergreen Teen Book Award Nominee (2006)
- Georgia Peach Book Award for Teen Readers Nominee (2006)
- Indian Paintbrush Book Award (Grades 4–6) Nominee (2007)
