= Nevada Library Association =

Professional association for librarians in Nevada

- Nickname: NLA
- Formation: June 4, 1946; 80 years ago
- Founded at: Reno, Nevada
- Tax ID no.: 88-0169111
- Headquarters: Henderson, Nevada
- Parent organization: American Library Association
- Website: nevadalibraries.org

The Nevada Library Association (NLA) is a professional organization for Nevada's librarians and library workers. It is headquartered in Henderson, Nevada. It was founded on June 4, 1946, in Reno, Nevada, the last state in the United States to form a state library association. State Librarian Charles Marriage was one of its chief co-founders and its first president was Edward Castagna. It became an official non-profit organization by statute in 1963 and then reorganized as private, non-profit corporation in 1993. NLA has been directly connected with every piece of library legislation passed by the Nevada State Legislature.

== See also ==
- List of libraries in the United States
