= Phrases from The Hitchhiker's Guide to the Galaxy =

Glossary of Douglas Adams' phrases

The Hitchhiker's Guide to the Galaxy is a comic science fiction series created by Douglas Adams that has become popular among fans of the genre and members of the scientific community. Phrases from it are widely recognised and often used in reference to, but outside the context of, the source material. Many writers on popular science, such as Fred Alan Wolf, Paul Davies, and Michio Kaku, have used quotations in their books to illustrate facts about cosmology or philosophy.

== The Answer to the Ultimate Question of Life, the Universe, and Everything is 42 ==
The Answer to the Ultimate Question of Life, the Universe, and Everything

In the radio series and the first novel, a group of hyper-intelligent pan-dimensional beings demand to learn the Answer to the Ultimate Question of Life, the Universe, and Everything from the supercomputer Deep Thought, specially built for this purpose. It takes Deep Thought 7 1/2 million years to compute and check the answer, which turns out to be 42. Deep Thought points out that the answer seems meaningless because the beings who instructed it never knew what the question was.

When asked to produce the Ultimate Question, Deep Thought says that it cannot; however, it can help to design an even more powerful computer that can. This new computer will incorporate living beings into the "computational matrix" and will run for ten million years. The computer is revealed as being the planet Earth, with its pan-dimensional creators assuming the form of white lab mice to observe its running. The process is hindered after eight million years by the unexpected arrival on Earth of the Golgafrinchans, and is then ruined completely, five minutes prior to completion, when the Earth is destroyed by the Vogons to supposedly make way for a new hyperspace bypass. In The Restaurant at the End of the Universe, this reason is revealed to have been a ruse: the Vogons had been hired to destroy the Earth by a consortium of psychiatrists, led by Gag Halfrunt, who feared for the loss of their careers when the Ultimate Question became known.

Lacking a real question, the mice (pan-dimensional beings) decide not to go through the whole process again and instead settle for the out-of-thin-air suggestion "How many roads must a man walk down?", a lyric from Bob Dylan's song "Blowin' in the Wind".

At the end of the radio series, the television series and the novel The Restaurant at the End of the Universe, Arthur Dent, having escaped the Earth's destruction, potentially has some of the computational matrix in his brain. He attempts to discover The Ultimate Question by extracting it from his brainwave patterns, as abusively suggested by Ford Prefect, when a Scrabble-playing caveman spells out "forty two". Arthur pulls random letters from a bag, but only gets the sentence "What do you get if you multiply six by nine?"

"Six by nine. Forty two."

"That's it. That's all there is."

"I always thought something was fundamentally wrong with the universe." (Note: This final line appears in some but not all editions of the work.)

Six times nine is actually fifty-four; the answer is deliberately wrong for that question because the question was miscomputed. The program on the "Earth computer" should have run correctly, but the unexpected arrival of the Golgafrinchans on prehistoric Earth caused input errors into the system—computing the wrong question (because of the garbage in, garbage out rule). Therefore, the question in Arthur's subconscious was invalid all along.

Quoting Fit the Seventh of the radio series, on Christmas Eve, 1978:

Narrator: There is a theory which states that if ever anyone discovers exactly what the Universe is for and why it is here, it will instantly disappear and be replaced by something even more bizarre and inexplicable. There is another theory mentioned, which states that this has already happened.

Some readers who were trying to find a deeper meaning in the passage soon noticed a certain veracity when using base-13; 6_{10} × 9_{10} = 54_{10}, which can be rewritten as 6_{13} × 9_{13} = 42_{13} (i.e. the decimal expression 54 is encoded as 42 in base-13). The author claimed that it was a mere coincidence.

In Life, the Universe and Everything, a character named "Prak", who "knows all that is true," confirms that 42 is indeed The Answer, and that it is impossible for both The Answer and The Question to be known in the same universe, as they will cancel each other out and take the Universe with them—to be replaced by something even more bizarre (as described in the first theory) and that it may have already happened (as described in the second). Though the question is never found, 42 is the table number at which Arthur and his friends sit when they arrive at Milliways at the end of the radio series. Likewise, Mostly Harmless ends when Arthur stops at a street address identified by his cry of, "There, number 42!" and enters the club Beta, owned by Stavro Mueller (Stavromula Beta). Shortly after, the Earth is destroyed in all existing incarnations.

=== Reasoning ===
Douglas Adams was frequently asked why he chose the number 42. Many theories were proposed, including that 42 is 101010 in base 2, that light refracts through a water surface by 42 degrees to create a rainbow, or that light requires 10^{−42} seconds to cross the diameter of a proton. Adams rejected them all. On 3 November 1993, he gave this answer on alt.fan.douglas-adams:

The answer to this is very simple. It was a joke. It had to be a number, an ordinary, smallish number, and I chose that one. Binary representations, base thirteen, Tibetan monks are all complete nonsense. I sat at my desk, stared into the garden and thought "42 will do" I typed it out. End of story.

Adams described his choice as "a completely ordinary number, a number not just divisible by two but also six and seven. In fact it's the sort of number that you could without any fear introduce to your parents."

While 42 was a number with no hidden meaning, Adams explained in more detail in an interview with Iain Johnstone of BBC Radio 4 (recorded in 1998 though never broadcast) to celebrate the first radio broadcast's 20th anniversary. Having decided it should be a number, he tried to think what an "ordinary number" should be. He ruled out non-integers, then he remembered having worked as a "prop-borrower" for John Cleese on his Video Arts training videos. Cleese needed a funny number for the punchline to a sketch involving a bank teller (himself) and a customer (Tim Brooke-Taylor). Adams believed that the number that Cleese came up with was 42 and he decided to use it.

Adams had also written a sketch for The Burkiss Way called "42 Logical Positivism Avenue", broadcast on BBC Radio 4 on 12 January 1977 – 14 months before The Hitchhiker's Guide first broadcast "42" in Fit the Fourth, 29 March 1978.

Burkiss Way, "Logical Positivism" sketch excerpt
An excerpt from Douglas Adams' The Burkiss Way sketch, "Logical Positivism" excerpt

In January 2000, in response to a panellist's "Where does the number 42 come from?" on the radio show Book Club, Adams explained that he was "on his way to work one morning, whilst still writing the scene, and was thinking about what the actual answer should be. He eventually decided that it should be something that made no sense whatsoever – a number, and a mundane one at that. And that is how he arrived at the number 42, completely at random."

Stephen Fry, a friend of Adams, claims that Adams told him "exactly why 42", and that the reason is "fascinating, extraordinary and, when you think hard about it, completely obvious." However, Fry says that he has vowed not to tell anyone the secret, and that it must go with him to the grave. In an interview at the Sydney Opera House in 2010, two minutes before the end of the show, Fry appears to be ready to reveal the answer, but remains inaudible due to an apparent failure of the microphone. John Lloyd, Adams' collaborator on The Meaning of Liff and two Hitchhiker's fits, said that Adams has called 42 "the funniest of the two-digit numbers."

The number 42 appears frequently in the work of Lewis Carroll, and some critics have suggested that this was an influence. They note, in particular, that Alice's attempt at her times tables (chapter two of the 1865 novel Alice's Adventures in Wonderland) breaks down at 4 × 13 answered in base 42, which virtually reverses the failure of 'the Question' ("What do you get if you multiply six by nine?"), in that the latter would equal "42" if calculated in base 13. They find further evidence of Carroll's influence in the fact that Adams entitled the episodes of the original radio series of The Hitchhiker's Guide to the Galaxy "fits", the word Carroll used to name the chapters of The Hunting of the Snark.

There is the tale that 42 is Adams' tribute to paperback books, as it is the average number of lines on a page of an average paperback. Another common guess is that 42 refers to the number of laws in cricket, a recurring theme of the books. Yet another possible reason relates to Adam's background in the ASCII character encoding, where the number 42 can be represented by an asterisk (*). The asterisk, in turn, essentially represents "input whatever the user would like". This leaves the symbolic meaning that the answer to life, the universe, and everything is anything the user would like it to be.

=== 42 Puzzle ===
The 42 puzzle. The shape of the islands in the background spells out 42, and there are 42 coloured balls.

The 42 puzzle orthorectified (1), and the number 42 hidden as binary (2), Hindu-Arabic numerals (3) and Roman numerals (4)

The 42 Puzzle is a game devised by Douglas Adams in 1994 for the United States series of The Hitchhiker's Guide to the Galaxy books. The puzzle is an illustration consisting of 42 multi-coloured balls, in 6 rows and 7 columns. Douglas Adams has said,

Everybody was looking for hidden meanings and puzzles and significances in what I had written (like 'is it significant that 6×9 = 42 in base 13?' As if.) So I thought that just for a change I would actually construct a puzzle and see how many people solved it. Of course, nobody paid it any attention. I think that's terribly significant.

In the puzzle the question is unknown, but the answer is already known to be 42. This is similar to the book where the "Answer to the Ultimate Question of Life, the Universe, and Everything" is known but not the question. The puzzle first appeared in The Illustrated Hitchhiker's Guide to the Galaxy. It was later incorporated into the covers of all five reprinted "Hitchhiker's" novels in the United States.

Adams has described the puzzle as depicting the number 42 in ten different ways. Six possible questions are:

Question	Explanation of answer
How many spheres are in the diagram?	6 rows × 7 columns = 42 spheres
What position in the grid does the Earth occupy?	42nd in both row- and column-major order
What does the barcode on one of the spheres encode?	The number 42 as an Interleaved 2 of 5 barcode
Considering red-hued spheres (red, purple, orange, black) as a '1' and those without as a '0', what number does each line represent in decimal form?	In binary, each line reads '0101010', or '42' in decimal form (Figure 2)
What number do the blue-tinted spheres (blue, green, purple, black) spell out?	42, similar to a colour blindness test (Figure 3)
What number is represented by Roman numerals spelled out by the yellow-tinted spheres (yellow, orange, green, black) in the first three rows?	XLII = 42 (Figure 4)

=== On the Internet and in software ===
The number 42 and its associated phrase, "Life, the universe, and everything", have attained cult status on the Internet. "Life, the universe, and everything" is a common name for the off-topic section of an Internet forum, and the phrase is invoked in similar ways to mean "anything at all". Many chatbots, when asked about the meaning of life, will answer "42". Several online calculators are also programmed with the Question. Google Calculator will give the result to "the answer to life the universe and everything" as 42, as will Wolfram's Computational Knowledge Engine and DuckDuckGo. In the online community Second Life, there is a section on a sim called "42nd Life". It is devoted to this concept in the book series, and several attempts at recreating Milliways, the Restaurant at the End of the Universe, were made.

In OpenOffice.org software (prior to version 3.4) if "=ANTWORT("Das Leben, das Universum und der ganze Rest") (German for =ANSWER("life, the universe and everything")) is typed into any cell of a spreadsheet, the result is 42.

ISO/IEC 14519-2001/ IEEE Std 1003.5-1999, IEEE Standard for Information Technology – POSIX(R) Ada Language Interfaces – Part 1: Binding for System Application Program Interface (API) , uses the number 42 as the required return value from a process that terminates due to an unhandled exception. The Rationale says "the choice of the value 42 is arbitrary" and cites the Adams book as the source of the value.

The standard for Tagged Image File Format TIFF defines in its Image File Header bytes 2 and 3 to denominate a 'version number' 42. In revision 5.0 the specification explained the choice with "This number, 42 (2A in hex), is not to be equated with the current Revision of the TIFF specification. In fact, the TIFF version number (42) has never changed, and probably never will. If it ever does, it means that TIFF has changed in some way so radical that a TIFF reader should give up immediately. The number 42 was chosen for its deep philosophical significance." The later versions have eliminated the lengthy description, but kept the number fixed at 42 anyway.

The random seed chosen to procedurally create the whole universe of the online multi-player computer game EVE Online was chosen as 42 by its lead game designer in 2002.

In the 2001 computer game Gothic, "42" is a code that deactivates all activated cheats. After typing "42" in a right place, the text "What was the question?" appears.

The OpenSUSE team decided the next version will be based on SUSE Linux Enterprise Desktop and named "Leap 42". The number 42 was chosen as a reference to the answer to life, the universe and everything.

The Google 1st generation Chromecast has the model number H2G2-42 referencing Douglas Adams' book.

=== Cultural references ===
The Allen Telescope Array, a radio telescope used by SETI, has 42 dishes in homage to the Answer.

In the American TV show Lost, 42 is the last of the mysterious numbers 4, 8, 15, 16, 23, and 42. In an interview with Lostpedia, producer David Fury confirmed this was a reference to Hitchhiker's.

The British TV show The Kumars at No. 42 is so named because show creator Sanjeev Bhaskar is a Hitchhiker's fan.

The band Coldplay's 2008 album Viva la Vida includes a song called "42". When asked by Q if the song's title was Hitchhiker's-related, Chris Martin said, "It is and it isn't."

The band Level 42 chose its name in reference to the book.

The 2007 episode "42" of the British science fiction television series Doctor Who was named in reference to the Answer. Writer Chris Chibnall acknowledged that "it's a playful title".

Ken Jennings, defeated along with Brad Rutter in a Jeopardy! match against IBM's Watson, writes that Watson's avatar which appeared on-screen for those games showed 42 "threads of thought," shown as colourful lines spinning around Watson's logo, and that the number was chosen in reference to this meme.

The Hitchhiker knitting pattern, designed by Martina Behm, is a scarf with 42 teeth.

In The Flash, Season 4, Episode 1, Cisco in trying to decipher what Barry is writing explicitly says that what Barry says might solve answer to the Life, the Universe and Everything, which Caitlin suggests is 42.

In The X-Files, Fox Mulder lives in apartment 42. This has been acknowledged by the show's creator, Chris Carter, as a reference to Hitchhikers.

The number 47 appears often throughout the Star Trek franchise. When producer Rick Berman was asked about the unusual frequency of the number, he stated, "47 is 42, corrected for inflation."

In season 2, episode 4 of A Discovery of Witches, an auction lot bearing drawings of the series' two main leads is numbered 42 and the number's connection to Douglas Adams is recognized in a conversation.

The upper stage used in SpaceX's Starship flight 15 was Ship 42. "DON'T PANIC" is painted immediately above the ship's "S42" label.

== Don't Panic ==
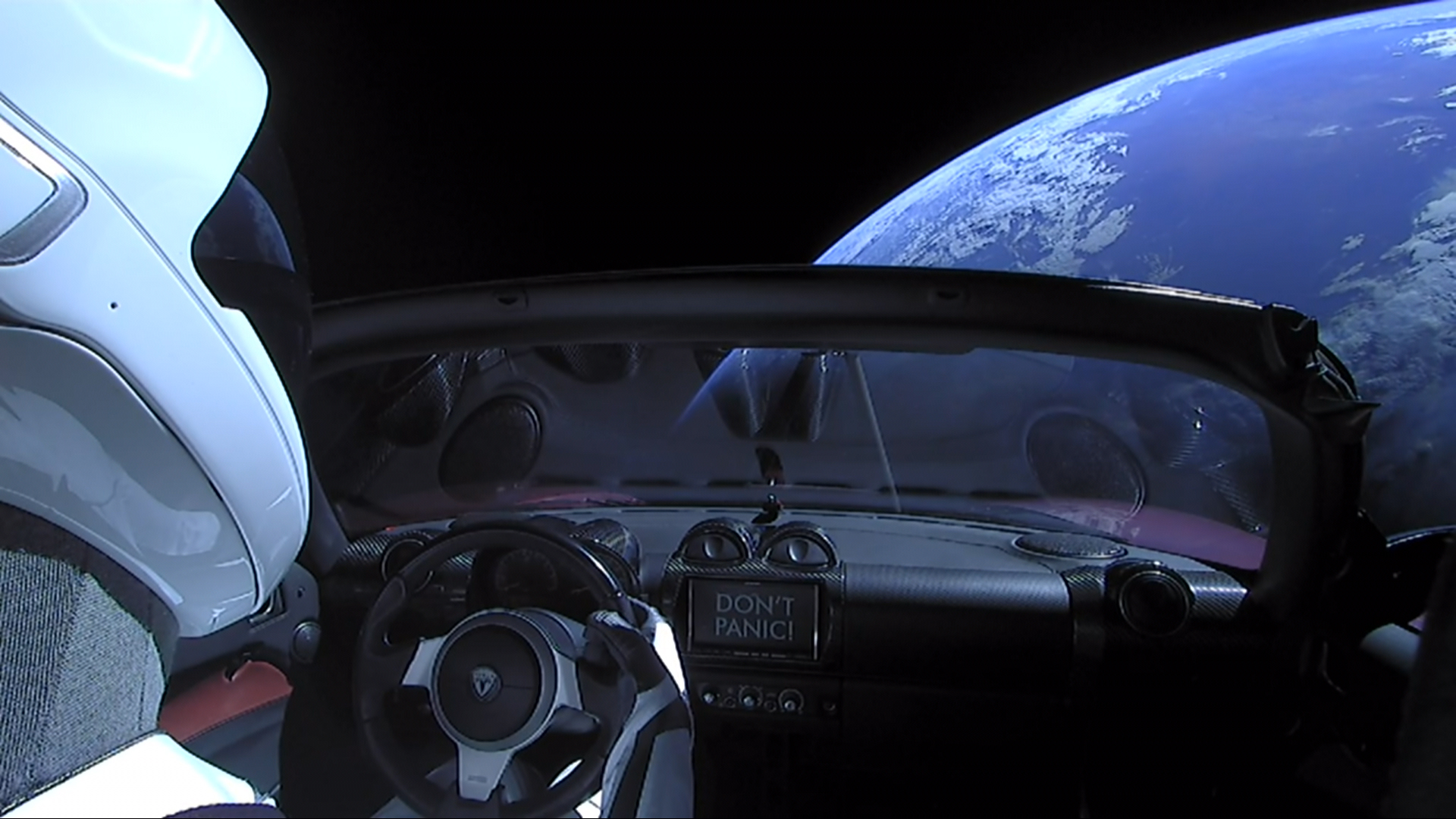
Elon Musk's Tesla Roadster in space with the entertainment system displaying "DON'T PANIC"

In the series, Don't Panic is a phrase on the cover of The Hitchhiker's Guide to the Galaxy. The novel explains that this was partly because the device "looked insanely complicated" to operate, and partly to keep interstellar travellers from panicking. "It is said that despite its many glaring (and occasionally fatal) inaccuracies, the Hitchhiker's Guide to the Galaxy itself has outsold the Encyclopedia Galactica because it is slightly cheaper, and because it has the words 'DON'T PANIC' in large, friendly letters on the cover."

Arthur C. Clarke said Douglas Adams' use of "don't panic" was perhaps the best advice that could be given to humanity.

On 6 February 2018 SpaceX launched the Falcon Heavy rocket, carrying Elon Musk's Tesla Roadster which had "DON'T PANIC!" written on the screen on the dashboard as a reference to the series.

== Knowing where one's towel is ==
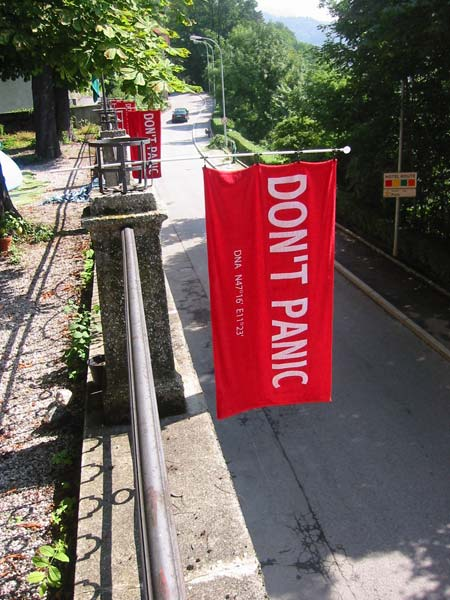
Towels in Innsbruck with the words "DON'T PANIC" on Towel Day

Within the Hitchhiker's Guide to the Galaxy universe, towels are regarded as indispensable equipment for experienced travellers, since they can be put to a wide variety of uses. Consequently, a person who can quickly adapt to virtually any new situation is said to know where their towel is. The logic behind this statement is presented in chapter 3 of the first novel in the series thusly:

... a towel has immense psychological value. For some reason, if a strag (strag: nonhitchhiker) discovers that a hitchhiker has his towel with him, he will automatically assume that he is also in possession of a toothbrush, washcloth, soap, tin of biscuits, flask, compass, map, ball of string, gnat spray, wet-weather gear, space suit etc., etc. Furthermore, the strag will then happily lend the hitchhiker any of these or a dozen other items that the hitchhiker might accidentally have "lost". What the strag will think is that any man who can hitch the length and breadth of the galaxy, rough it, slum it, struggle against terrible odds, win through, and still knows where his towel is, is clearly a man to be reckoned with.

Adams got the idea for this phrase when he went travelling and found that his beach towel kept disappearing. In the 1985 book The Hitchhiker's Guide to the Galaxy: The Original Radio Scripts, his friends describe how he would always "mislay" his towel. On Towel Day, fans commemorate Adams by carrying towels with them.

== Mostly Harmless ==
The only entry about Earth in the Guide used to be "Harmless", but Ford Prefect managed to change it a little before getting stuck on Earth. "Mostly Harmless" provoked a very upset reaction from Arthur when heard. Those two words are not what Ford submitted as a result of his research—merely all that was left after his editors were done with it. The term is the title of the fifth book in the Hitchhiker "trilogy". Its popularity is such that it has become the definition of Earth in many standard works of sci-fi reference, like The Star Trek Encyclopedia. Additionally, "Harmless" and "Mostly Harmless" both feature as ranks in the computer game Elite and its sequels. Also, in World of Warcraft, there is a rifle that fires (mostly) harmless pellets. In the MMORPG RuneScape, there is an island called Mos Le'Harmless (Mostly Harmless). Low-scoring players in the multiplayer version of the game Perfect Dark and GoldenEye 007 are awarded with the designation "mostly harmless". In the 2008 edition of the board game Cosmic Encounter, the human race is given the attribute "Mostly Harmless". In the game Kerbal Space Program, there is an atomic rocket motor with the description "mostly harmless". Another reference is in the book title Mostly Harmless Econometrics.

== Not entirely unlike ==
In chapter 17 of the novel The Hitchhiker's Guide to the Galaxy, Arthur Dent tries to get a Nutrimatic drinks dispenser to produce a cup of tea. Instead, it invariably produces a concoction (which most people found unpleasant) that is "almost, but not quite, entirely unlike tea".

One of the primary goals of the player, as Arthur Dent, in the video game The Hitchhiker's Guide to the Galaxy, is to thwart the machine and find some decent tea, a mission that the player is constantly reminded of by the inventory item "no tea". According to the Jargon File, the briefer "not entirely unlike" has entered hacker jargon.

== Share and Enjoy ==
"Share and Enjoy" is the slogan of the Sirius Cybernetics Corporation Complaints Division. In the radio version, this phrase had its own song (sung in Fit the Ninth of the radio series), which was sung by a choir of robots during "special occasions". The Sirius Cybernetics Corporation tends to produce inherently faulty goods, which renders the statement ironic since few people would want to "Share and Enjoy" something that was defective. Among the design flaws is the choir of robots that perform this song: they sing a tritone out of tune with the accompaniment. The Guide relates that the words "Share and Enjoy" were displayed in illuminated letters three miles high near the Sirius Cybernetics Complaints Division, until their weight caused them to collapse through the underground offices of many young executives. The upper half of the sign that now protrudes translates in the local tongue as "Go stick your head in a pig", and is lit up only for special celebrations.

The episode Fit the Twentieth of the radio series features a personal computer OS booting sound (à la The Microsoft Sound) set to the tune of "Share and Enjoy". Furthermore, Fit the Twenty-First of the radio series, the last episode in the adaptation of the novel So Long, and Thanks for All the Fish, features a polyphonic ringtone version of the tune. The "Share and Enjoy" tune also is used in the TV series as the backing for a Sirius Cybernetics Corporation robot commercial (slogan: "Your plastic pal who's fun to be with!").

== So Long, and Thanks for All the Fish ==
After mice, the second most intelligent species on Earth were the dolphins.

The dolphins had long known of the impending demolition of Earth and had made many attempts to alert mankind to the danger...The last ever dolphins message was misinterpreted as a surprisingly sophisticated attempt to do a double backward somersault through a hoop whilst whistling "The Star-Spangled Banner", but in fact the message was this: "So Long, and Thanks for All the Fish."

— Douglas Adams, The Hitchhiker's Guide to the Galaxy

The line was also the title of the fourth book in the trilogy, and appears in that book as a message inscribed on crystal bowls left as parting gifts from the dolphins to selected members of the human race. Its popularity was such that it was the title of the opening song for the 2005 movie The Hitchhiker's Guide to the Galaxy.

The phrase was spoofed for the 1997 NOFX album So Long, and Thanks for All the Shoes.

This is also the title of a track by A Perfect Circle on their 2018 album Eat the Elephant.

In the game Factorio (a cooperative construction survival game about managing an extraterrestrial factory on an alien planet), which entered early access on Steam in 2012 and saw its full release in 2020, there is an achievement titled "So Long, and Thanks for All the Fish," which is a direct reference to the book.

== Two to the power of two hundred and seventy-six thousand, seven hundred and nine to one against ==
The odds $2^{276,709}:1$ against are introduced in the first book of the series, shortly after Arthur Dent and Ford Prefect have been rescued from Earth's destruction by hitching a lift on a Vogon Constructor Ship. They are discovered by the Vogons (who hate hitchhikers), dragged before the Vogon Captain, subjected to his poetry, and about to be thrown out of the airlock. The Guide said the following about the odds that they would be rescued:

The Hitchhiker’s Guide to the Galaxy says that if you hold a lungful of air you can survive in the total vacuum of space for about thirty seconds. However, it does go on to say that what with space being the mind-boggling size it is the chances of getting picked up by another ship within those thirty seconds are two to the power of two hundred and seventy-six thousand, seven hundred and nine to one against. By a totally staggering coincidence, that is also the telephone number of an Islington flat where Arthur once went to a very good party and met a very nice girl whom he totally failed to get off with—she went off with a gate-crasher.

The radio play script uses "two to the power of two hundred and sixty seven thousand seven hundred and nine to one against": $2^{267,709}:1$ against (the exponent begins 267 rather than 276). As well as being the phone number of a fictional flat, 226 7709 (including both base and exponent) was also the number of an actual flat where Douglas Adams lived in Islington, London.

== See also ==
- 42 (number)
- Apophenia
- Meaning of life
- Somebody Else's Problem
