= The Hitchhiker's Guide to the Galaxy (TV series) =

1981 British sci-fi comedy TV series)

- Opening titles designed by Doug Burd
- Created by: Douglas Adams
- Based on: The Hitchhiker's Guide to the Galaxy by Douglas Adams
- Developed by: John Lloyd
- Starring: Peter Jones; Simon Jones; David Dixon; Mark Wing-Davey; Sandra Dickinson; David Learner; Stephen Moore
- Narrated by: Peter Jones (as "The Book")
- Theme music composer: Bernie Leadon
- Opening theme: "Journey of the Sorcerer" by the Eagles
- Ending theme: "What a Wonderful World" by Louis Armstrong (used in episode six)
- Country of origin: United Kingdom
- Original language: English
- No. of episodes: 6

Production
- Producers: Alan J.W. Bell; John Lloyd
- Running time: 31-36 minutes

Original release
- Network: BBC2
- Release: 5 January – 9 February 1981

Related
- The Hitchhiker's Guide to the Galaxy

The Hitchhiker's Guide to the Galaxy is a BBC television adaptation of Douglas Adams' The Hitchhiker's Guide to the Galaxy which aired between 5 January and 9 February 1981 on BBC2 in the United Kingdom. The adaptation was released following the original radio series in 1978 and 1980, the first novel and double LP, in 1979, and the stage shows, in 1979 and 1980, making it the fifth iteration of the guide.

The series stars Simon Jones as Arthur Dent, David Dixon as Ford Prefect, Mark Wing-Davey as Zaphod Beeblebrox, Sandra Dickinson as Trillian and Stephen Moore as the voice of Marvin. The voice of the guide is by Peter Jones. Peter Jones, Simon Jones, Moore and Wing-Davey reprised their roles from the original radio series in 1978/80, as did supporting actors Richard Vernon and David Tate. In addition, the series features a number of notable cameo roles, including Adams himself on several occasions.

Although initially thought by BBC executives to be unfilmable, the series was successfully produced and directed by Alan J. W. Bell and went on to win a Royal Television Society Award and a Design and Art Director’s Award as Most Original Programme of 1981, as well as several British Academy Television Awards for its graphics and editing.

== Development and production ==
After the success of the first seven episodes of the radio series, all broadcast in 1978, and while the second radio series was being recorded, Douglas Adams was commissioned to deliver a pilot script for a television adaptation on 29 May 1979, to be delivered by 1 August. A fully animated version was briefly discussed in the autumn of 1978, but it was eventually decided to make most of the series feature "live action" and animate only The Guide's entries. John Lloyd, who had worked with Adams on the first radio series, is credited with starting the process of adapting the series for television, after the receipt of the pilot script, with a memo to the head of light entertainment (John Howard Davies) in September 1979. Adams was still working on scripts for the second radio series of Hitchhiker's and working as script editor for Doctor Who, and thus the BBC extended the deadline for the pilot script of the television adaptation to the end of November. The script for the pilot was delivered in December 1979, and terms for the five remaining scripts were agreed upon in January 1980. While there was some resistance to a project considered "unfilmable," Alan J. W. Bell was given the duties to produce and direct the television adaptation. John Lloyd was signed as associate producer.

Simon Jones as Arthur Dent, watching his home being demolished in the first television episode.

In early 1980, production on the pilot episode began on several fronts. Rod Lord of Pearce Animation Studios directed a 50-second pilot, hand-animated, giving a 'computer graphic' feel to the Babel Fish speech of the first episode. Adams and Bell were both pleased with the animation, and Lord was given the go-ahead to do all of the animation for episode one, and subsequently the complete television series. Narration for the first episode was recorded by Peter Jones in March 1980. The filming of two green-skinned aliens reacting to Pan Galactic Gargle Blasters was done on 8 May 1980. Further filming of crowd reactions to the Vogons, location filming of Arthur's house and a scene in a pub were done between 11 and 16 May 1980. Scenes aboard the Vogon ship were recorded on 7 June 1980, in the BBC's TC1 studio. The final edit of the pilot episode was completed on 2 July 1980, and it was premiered for a test audience three days later (5 July). Further test screenings were held in August 1980. Based on successful test screenings, the cast was reassembled to complete the six episodes of the series in September 1980. Production continued through the autumn, with filming and recording occurring out of order. Recording and production of the final episode continued into January 1981.

The gap in production made for some continuity problems between the pilot episode and the remainder. Notably, Simon Jones' hair was cut short for another role and he wears a noticeable hairpiece in later episodes. Conversely, David Dixon's hair appears longer.

One major change first appeared in the stage show and LP adaptations, and made its way into the novels and television adaptation. Nearly all of the sequences from episodes five and six in the first radio series that were originally co-written with John Lloyd were completely cut. Thus the Hotblack Desiato character and Disaster Area make appearances in episode five, and Ford, Arthur, Zaphod and Trillian are all randomly teleported off of Disaster Area's stunt ship in episode six. Lloyd does receive a co-writer's credit on episode five, for the material on the statistics about the universe. The complexities of adapting the material for television meant that some episodes became as long as 35 minutes; as a result, material that had appeared in the radio series (e.g.: the seance involving Zaphod's ancestors) had to be cut. The programme is particularly notable for its mock computer animation sequences, actually produced on film using traditional cel animation techniques. There have been several different edits of the series: Some, but not all, American PBS stations recut the series into seven 30-minute episodes when they began transmitting the episodes nearly two years later, in December 1982. Other PBS stations re-edited the programme into television movies, broadcasting more than one episode at a time without interruption. The UK videotape release was on two cassettes, each consisting of three episodes edited to run together and also adding some previously unseen material. The soundtrack was remixed into stereo. The North American VHS tape released by CBS/Fox Video included this material on a single video cassette. The DVD edition claims to be the final and definitive version of the six television episodes.

Mark Wing-Davey as Zaphod Beeblebrox with animatronic second head and third arm.

Another production problem was that, being a visual adaptation, a solution had to be found to display Zaphod's three arms and two heads, a joke originally written for radio. In a previous stage adaptation, a version of a pantomime horse was used, where two actors filled one costume, providing three arms and two heads between them. For this television series, a radio-controlled animatronic head was designed and built, incorporating twelve servo motors and two receivers. However, the head was notoriously unreliable and in many scenes merely sits there, inanimate. For the third arm, most of the time it was seen tucked into Zaphod's jacket. But when called for Mike Kelt, who had designed the extra head (with make-up, hair and prosthetics designer Joan Stribling) would hide behind Mark Wing-Davey and slip his arm into the appropriate sleeve.

Other elements to the production were done by a variety of BBC designers. The Heart of Gold and B Ark models were built by Perry Brahan. The small, furry creature from Alpha Centauri in episode three was a puppet designed and controlled by Jim Francis, who also built the Magrathean bubble car (also seen in episode three), and was the stunt double for Richard Vernon in the scene in which the bubble car was seen to fly. Matte paintings throughout the series were created by Jean Peyre. Music and sound effects were by Paddy Kingsland of the BBC Radiophonic Workshop, with the exception of the theme music; the familiar Journey of the Sorcerer theme by Bernie Leadon was used again, in the arrangement by Tim Souster that had previously been used for the Hitchhiker's LP. Video effects using the Quantel system were done by Dave Jervis. Other puppets, including insects seen in episode five, were designed by Susan Moore. Some of the actual puppeteering was done by Stuart Murdoch, including operating parts of the Dish of the Day animal. Two important cast changes were made for the television version. David Dixon replaced Geoffrey McGivern as Ford, and Sandra Dickinson replaced Susan Sheridan as Trillian. The changes were made because McGivern did not suit the role visually, and Sheridan was unavailable at the time. Another new cast member was Michael Cule, who appears as the Vogon guard in episode two. Cule had first appeared in one of the Hitchhiker's stage adaptations, performing no fewer than twelve roles. He reprised the Vogon guard part in the 1992 Making of the Hitchhiker's Guide to the Galaxy television documentary, voiced the Babel fish, appeared in the 1994 photo illustrated edition of the book (as Prosser), and returned a third time as a Vogon guard for the BBC Radio 4 Quandary Phase.

Martin Benson as Prostetnic Vogon Jeltz reading poetry at Ford and Arthur during the second television episode.

Because of the sheer number of models used in episodes two to six, a single day of filming just the model sequences was set aside at the BBC Television Centre on 28 October 1980. This has been described as "a luxury few other shows could afford". To provide proper timing of spoken lines on-set, as Douglas Adams himself spoke the lines of Eddie the Computer and Deep Thought, until they were redubbed by David Tate and Valentine Dyall respectively. Adams had several cameo appearances during episodes one to three in the television series:

- One of the drinkers in the background of the pub.
- The man who walks naked into the ocean, similar to Reginald Perrin. The original actor for the part called in sick.
- The Guide entry on "The Worst Poetry" also used Adams's likeness as the basis for the illustration of Paula Nancy Millstone Jennings.
- In the future Encyclopedia Galactica, Adams making a cameo appearance as one of the Sirius Cybernetic Marketing Division members.
- An image in a guide entry on "an important and popular fact", along with animator Rod Lord, who provided a self-portrait.

The hand-animated "computer graphics" of The Hitchhiker's Guide itself won a BAFTA, a Design and Art Direction Silver award, and a London Film Fest award. The spaceman suspended from a wire in the opening title sequence was Alan Harris. Locations for filming included a clay pit and the former Par-Fowey railway tunnel in Cornwall, the Edmonds Farm and Red Lion pub in Haywards Heath, Sussex, the Budgemoor Golf & Country Club near Henley-on-Thames, and at Dovestones in the Peak District National Park. Episode three was originally scripted to have a "pre-credits sequence" where Trillian announces their arrival at "the most improbable planet that ever existed", Magrathea, to Zaphod. This was never filmed. The arrangement of Journey of the Sorcerer by Tim Souster, used in the titles, was released as a single in the UK in January 1981. The B-side featured Douglas Adams playing rhythm guitar. Many of the costumes seen in episodes one to four can be seen again during sequences at Milliway's in episode five, as well as the writing at the start showing 42 crossed out several times also includes the number 101010 which is the 42nd number in the binary number base.

A second series was planned at one point, with a storyline, according to Alan Bell and Mark Wing-Davey, that would have come from Adams' abandoned Doctor Who and the Krikkitmen project (instead of a television version of the second radio series). Adams got into disputes with the BBC (accounts differ: problems with budget, scripts, and having Alan Bell or Geoffrey Perkins involved were all offered as causes), and the second series was never made. The elements of the Doctor Who and the Krikketmen project instead became the third novel, Life, the Universe and Everything.

== Documentary ==

In 1992, Kevin Davies wrote and directed a documentary entitled The Making of the Hitchhiker's Guide to the Galaxy. Davies had previously worked on the stage show at the Rainbow Theatre, and while working for Pierce Animation Studios in 1980, had introduced Alan Bell to Rod Lord, leading to the animation for the television series. For the documentary, Davies used many photographs and home movies he shot during the 1980 production of the series and recorded new interviews in October 1992 with the cast and crew. New footage of Simon Jones, David Dixon and Michael Cule, in character, were shot at the farm in Sussex used as Arthur Dent's house, and incorporated into the documentary with some references to So Long, and Thanks for All the Fish, such as Arthur finding his home intact, and placing his (animated) Babel fish into a goldfish bowl. BBC Video released the 60-minute documentary on VHS in 1993. Footage not included in the original documentary was included in the 2002 DVD release of the series. The documentary itself has not (as of 2024) been transmitted on television.

== Cast ==
=== Main characters ===
- The Book (narrator): Peter Jones
- Arthur Dent: Simon Jones
- Ford Prefect: David Dixon
- Trillian: Sandra Dickinson
- Zaphod Beeblebrox: Mark Wing-Davey
- Marvin the Paranoid Android: David Learner
- Marvin (voice): Stephen Moore

=== Minor characters ===
- Mr Prosser: Joe Melia
- First workman: Terry Duran
- Second workman: George Cornelius
- Alien girl: Cleo Rocos
- Alien guy: Andrew Mussell
- Man at end of bar: Douglas Adams
- Barman: Steve Conway
- Barfly: Steve Trainer
- Prostetnic Vogon Jeltz (Vogon Captain): Martin Benson
- Vogon guard: Michael Cule
- Sandwich-board man: David Grahame
- Irritated man hitting radio: Bill Barnsley
- Unhappy man: Douglas Adams
- Young Smartarse: Ralph Morse
- Newscaster: Rayner Bourton
- Bikini girl in commercial for Sirius Cybernetics Corporation: Jennifer Goble
- Gag Halfrunt: Gil Morris
- Eddie the Computer: David Tate
- Spaceman: John Austen-Gregg
- Spacewoman: Zoe Hendry
- First handmaiden: Nicola Critcher
- Second handmaiden: Jacoba
- Third handmaiden: Lorraine Paul
- Fourth handmaiden: Susie Silvey
- Rich Merchant: John Dair
- Slartibartfast: Richard Vernon
- The Whale (voice): Stephen Moore
- PA voice: David Tate
- Lunkwill/Loon-Quall: Antony Carrick^{[a]}
- Fook/Phougg: Timothy Davies
- Deep Thought: Valentine Dyall
- Guard: Richard Reid
- Majikthise: David Leland^{[a]}
- Vroomfondel: Charles McKeown
- Alien Robot: Eddie Sommer
- G'Gugvunt leader: Eric French
- Vl'Hurg leader: James Muir
- Benjy Mouse: David Tate
- Frankie Mouse: Stephen Moore
- Bang Bang: Marc Smith
- Shooty: Matt Zimmerman
- Garkbit (head waiter): Jack May
- Girl on stairs: Mary Eveleigh
- Hotblack Desiato: Barry Frank Warren
- Bodyguard: Dave Prowse
- Max Quordlepleen: Colin Jeavons
- Dish of the Day: Peter Davison
- The Great Prophet Zarquon: Colin Bennett
- Number One: Matthew Scurfield
- Number Two: David Neville
- Number Three: Geoffrey Beevers
- B Ark Captain: Aubrey Morris
- Marketing girl: Beth Porter
- Hairdresser: David Rowlands
- Management consultant: Jon Glover

== Episodes ==
No.	Title	Original release date
1	"Fit the First"	5 January 1981
A pre-credits sequence shows a countdown to the end of the world as the narrator tells the story of the Hitchhiker's Guide to the Galaxy and Arthur Dent's connection to it. As the sun rises over the English countryside for the final time, Arthur wakes to discover his house has been scheduled for demolition as a bulldozer heads for his house. Arthur's friend Ford Prefect arrives to tell him his home is about to be destroyed, but reveals himself to be an alien journalist working on a new version of the eponymous Hitchhikers Guide to the Galaxy, and clarifies that Earth itself has been scheduled for demolition by the bureaucratic Vogons, who soon arrive in Earth orbit. After hitchhiking onto a Vogon ship, Ford guides Arthur through the basics of interstellar survival, including the importance of towels, before they are discovered. Ford laments that, if they are lucky, they will probably be thrown into deep space although if they are unlucky, the Vogon captain "might want to read us some of his poetry first".
2	"Fit the Second"	12 January 1981
After being subjected to Vogon poetry, Arthur and Ford are thrown out of an airlock but improbably rescued just before death by the starship Heart of Gold, which has been stolen by Ford's semi-cousin Zaphod Beeblebrox, accompanied by Trillian, a young Earthwoman who Arthur once met at a party in London. Ford and Arthur are escorted to the bridge by Marvin the Paranoid Android and meet Zaphod and Trillian.
3	"Fit the Third"	19 January 1981
The Guide explains the origin of the legendary planet of Magrathea, which manufactured planets for the hyper-wealthy millions of years ago, until the galactic economy collapsed. Zaphod explains to Ford that he has found the legendary planet and intends to plunder its fabulous wealth. Zaphod orders the computer to land on the planet surface but before long they receive a transmission from the commercial council of Magrathea, informing them that the planet is closed for business and asking them to leave. They ignore this and receive another message, noting that nuclear missiles have been launched at the ship, although this is just a professional courtesy reserved for the planet's most persistent customers. When attempts to evade the missiles fail, Arthur uses the ship's Infinite Improbability Drive which ends up turning the missiles into a very surprised looking whale and a bowl of petunias. Trillian discovers that during the chaos her mice have escaped. The five head onto the surface where they find it desolate. Zaphod suggests that the Magratheans lived beneath the surface of the planet so they split into two groups – Trillian, Zaphod and Ford explore a tunnel, while Arthur and Marvin remain on the surface. Trillian, Zaphod and Ford's thread ends on a cliffhanger, with them seeing something alarming at the end of the corridor. Meanwhile, Arthur and Marvin watch the sunset. Eventually, Slartibartfast, a Magrathean engineer arrives and asks Arthur to come with him. Leaving Marvin to watch the ship, he explains that the Magratheans were in hibernation for the last five million years while they waited for the galactic economy (which they inadvertently crashed) to recover. They descend deep into a tunnel as the Guide narrative explains that while humanity had always assumed that it was the most intelligent species on Earth, in fact the dolphins were more intelligent and had left the planet some time before. However, both the dolphins and humans were less intelligent than mice. Meanwhile, Slartibartfast shows Arthur the vast tract of hyperspace that acts as the Magrathean's factory floor, and that they have been brought out of hibernation for a special commission – "the Earth Mk II, we're making a copy from our original blueprints". It is revealed that the Earth was originally made by Magrathea as a giant supercomputer for mice, but it was destroyed five minutes before completing its programming.
4	"Fit the Fourth"	26 January 1981
Slartibartfast shows Arthur the archive tapes of the development of Deep Thought, the second most powerful computer ever built, that was given the order to search for the Ultimate Answer to Life, The Universe and Everything. After seven and a half million years, Deep Thought confidently announced that the answer was "42". The Earth was then commissioned from Magrathea to be the most complex supercomputer in existence, in which life itself would make up the primary programming matrix, with the task of searching for the Ultimate Question to Life, The Universe and Everything. Slartibartfast and Arthur join Ford, Trillian, Zaphod, and Trillian's mice, who were in fact descendants of Deep Thoughts builders and had guided them to Magrathea. The mice dismiss Slartibartfast, then express their desire to determine the Ultimate Question by first extracting Arthur's brain. While the mice attempt to strike a deal, the galactic police arrive to arrest Zaphod for the theft of the Heart of Gold. Ford, Arthur, Trillian and Zaphod flee the dining hall only to be cornered by the police in a large bay. After a misunderstanding, the police open fire on a computer behind which the four are hiding, causing it to explode.
5	"Fit the Fifth"	2 February 1981
After an initial period of confusion, the four travellers find that the explosion has somehow transported them forward in time to just before the end of the universe. They are in "Milliways, the Restaurant at the End of the Universe", which was built on the ruins of Magrathea. Having travelled through time but not through space, they find Marvin still waiting for them 40 million years after being left behind. He's now an attendant at the car park, and still depressed. Just before the universe ends, Zaphod and Ford get Marvin to help them steal a spaceship, which turns out to be the property of the galaxy's loudest rock band, "Disaster Area". The episode ends as the ship is about to start Disaster Area's signature concert finale; a dive into the sun of Kakrafoon.
6	"Fit the Sixth"	9 February 1981
Just before the ship crashes into the sun, Zaphod, Trillian, Ford, and Arthur escape in a teleport module that they convince Marvin to stay behind and operate. He is still on the ship when it heads into the sun, despite announcing that after 40 million years of existence, he has, in fact, worked out the Ultimate Question. Ford and Arthur arrive – without Zaphod and Trillian – on a spaceship carrying millions of people in cryogenic pods. The ship's inhabitants are from Golgafrincham and are made up of unskilled workers in apparently pointless jobs: marketing managers, used car salesmen, business analysts etc.. Years before, the intellectual and practical elite people of Golgafrincham (the thinkers and the doers) had tricked the most unproductive members of their society into leaving the planet by saying it was doomed. The ship lands on pre-historic Earth, and Ford realises that the Golgafrinchans, not the primitive cave dwellers already on the planet, are the ones that will evolve into the human race. Later, Ford realises that the Ultimate Question may still be in Arthurs's head and using improvised Scrabble tiles Arthur blindly pulls the question "What do you get if you multiply 6 by 9" from a bag (implying that, since the Golgafrinchans supplanted Homo Erectus as the dominant Earth species, the Earths programming has become corrupted). The two friends lament the eventual destruction of the Earth as "What a Wonderful World" by Louis Armstrong plays. An after-credits scene shows the Guide, now floating in space, as it shows the updated entry for Earth that Ford had spent 15 years working on, "Earth: Mostly Harmless".

== Availability ==
Front cover of the first part of the UK VHS release of the series.

Neil Gaiman reveals in the first edition of his biography of Douglas Adams, Don't Panic, that the BBC was preparing a Laserdisc release of the Hitchhiker's television series in the mid-1980s, but had to cancel the project due to a legal tangle with the movie rights, although master tapes for the Laserdiscs were prepared. The sound was specially remixed in stereo and Elektra/Asylum records agreed to license the original Eagles theme music. The series was eventually released on VHS format by BBC Video in 1992. This was a dual cassette edition featuring additional material that had originally been cut from the broadcast episodes. CBS/Fox Video made the six episodes available on a single VHS tape in North America starting in 1993. They were joined by The Making of the Hitchhiker's Guide to the Galaxy, also on VHS, that same year, as well as a Laserdisc release. A double tape box set edition was also released featuring the collected complete series and Making of releases. Restoration of the six episodes and the Making of documentary commenced in 2001, with a Region 2 and 4 DVD release in the United Kingdom by BBC Video (Catalogue Number BBCDVD 1092) in January 2002. A Region 1 edition, released by Warner Home Video, followed in April 2002. Both DVD editions are two-disc sets, with the six episodes on the first disc and accompanying bonus materials on the second. The North American DVD edition also has a copy of the Omnibus tribute to Douglas Adams from BBC Two that aired on 4 August 2001, which the UK DVD edition does not.

A special edition box set of the series was released on Blu-ray and DVD on 1 October 2018. The set featured upscaled HD versions of the original episodes alongside optional stereo or 5.1 surround sound mixes remastered by Mark Ayres, formerly of the BBC Radiophonic Workshop.

In North America, the complete series is viewable on Hulu, Amazon Prime and BritBox. In the UK, the complete series is viewable on BritBox, with the Special Edition available on Amazon Prime Video.

== Reception ==
On Rotten Tomatoes, the show has a 71% approval rating based on seven reviews.

== Awards ==
- Royal Television Society Awards:; RTS Award - Make-up, Hair & Prosthetics Designer- Joan Stribling
  - Best Original Programme
  - Design & Art Directors Award Joan Stribling & Mike Kelt
- British Academy Television Awards:
  - Best VTR Editor: Ian Williams
  - Best Sound Supervisor: Michael McCarthy
  - Best Graphics: Rod Lord

== Notes ==
1. ^a The part of "Loon-Quall," one of the two computer programmers who hears Deep Thought announce "The Answer," is stated by the DVD production notes as being played by David Leland. However, the idea of the role was for that character to have been descended from the earlier programmer, Lunkwill, played by Antony Carrick.

== Sources ==
- The Hitchhiker's Guide to the Galaxy, VHS, R1 and R2 DVD releases of the TV series. DVD "Onscreen Production Notes" by Kevin Davies.
- Webb, Nick. Wish You Were Here: The Official Biography of Douglas Adams, 1st American edition. Ballantine Books, New York, NY, USA, 2005.
