= The Hitchhiker's Guide to the Galaxy (fictional) =

Book within the book series of the same name

- Rendition of the Guide
- First appearance: Fit the First (radio)
- Last appearance: And Another Thing...
- Created by: Douglas Adams
- Portrayed by: Peter Jones (all save for following); William Franklyn (radio series 3–5); John Lloyd (radio series 6); Stephen Fry (film)

In-universe information
- Nickname: The Guide
- Origin: Ursa Minor Beta

The Hitchhiker's Guide to the Galaxy is a fictional electronic guide book in the multimedia scifi/comedy series of the same name by Douglas Adams. The Guide serves as "the standard repository for all knowledge and wisdom" for many members of the series' galaxy-spanning civilization. Entries from the guidebook are used as comic narration to bridge events and provide background information in every version of the story. The guide is published by "Megadodo Publications", a publishing company on Ursa Minor Beta, and it is written and edited by many characters throughout the series.

In the original radio scripts, the Guide's voice was called the "Narrator" and in the 2004–2005 series, "The Voice". For all of the radio series and the 1981 TV series, the role was credited as "The Book", though this was changed to "Narrator/The Guide" for the 2005 movie.

In the first two phases of the radio series, the LP album adaptations of the first radio series and in the television series, the Guide was voiced by British actor Peter Jones. During the 2004–2005 radio series, The Guide was voiced by William Franklyn. In the film version, it was voiced by Stephen Fry. In the Hexagonal Phase of the radio series, based on the novel, And Another Thing..., the Guide was voiced by the series co-creator John Lloyd.

== Overview ==
In the Guide's own entry on itself, this "wholly remarkable" book is described as being Megadodo Publications' most successful book, being more popular than The Celestial Homecare Omnibus, better-selling than 53 More Things To Do in Zero Gravity and more controversial than philosophical author Oolon Colluphid's blockbuster "God Trilogy" (Where God Went Wrong, Some More of God's Greatest Mistakes, and Who is this God Person Anyway?).

It is said to have supplanted the rival Encyclopedia Galactica as a "standard repository of all knowledge and wisdom" in some parts of the galaxy for two reasons, one of them being that it has a slightly cheaper price, and the other that it has the words "DON'T PANIC" printed on its cover.

== Entries ==
The Guide's numerous entries are quoted throughout the various incarnations of the Hitchhiker's Guide series. As well as offering background information, the Guide's entries often employ irony, sarcasm and subtle commentary on the action and on life in general. For instance, the entry on the Sirius Cybernetics Corporation describes their marketing division as "a bunch of mindless jerks who will be the first against the wall when the revolution comes", with a footnote to the effect that the editors would welcome applications from anyone interested in taking over the post of robotics correspondent. The entry on the villainous Vogons begins, "Here's what to do if you want to get a lift from a Vogon: forget it." The entry on "What to do if you find yourself stuck in a crack in the ground underneath a giant boulder you can't move, with no hope of rescue" suggests that first, you "consider how lucky you are that life has been good to you so far. Alternatively, if life hasn't been good to you so far, which given your current circumstances seems more likely, consider how lucky you are that it won't be troubling you much longer." Its advice on drunkenness is simply, "Go to it, and good luck", and according to the 2005 film, its entry on love is "Avoid, if at all possible".

The Guide tends to focus on certain topics. For instance, if looking for information about sex, the Guide suggests reading "chapters seven, nine, ten, eleven, fourteen, sixteen, seventeen, nineteen, twenty-one to eighty-four inclusive, and in fact most of the rest of the Guide." On the Guide's outdated and typo-filled entries (some of which could cause serious injury or death, such as "Ravenous Bugblatter Beasts often make a very good meal for visiting tourists," rather than "Ravenous Bugblatter Beasts often make a very good meal of visiting tourists.") Adams wrote, "...though it cannot hope to be useful or informative on all matters, it does make the reassuring claim that where it is inaccurate, it is at least definitively inaccurate. In cases of major discrepancy it was always reality that's got it wrong."

== Editing ==
Despite the work of dedicated field researchers such as Ford Prefect, many of the contributions to the Guide are made on a strictly ad hoc basis. With the permanent staff more likely to be on a lunch break than working, "most of the actual work got done by any passing stranger who happened to wander into the empty offices of an afternoon and saw something worth doing." This has led to the Guide being patchy in its coverage, cobbled together (for example: the entry on "The Universe" was copied from the back of a packet of breakfast cereal) and often riddled with errors. The novel of the same name notes that "it has many omissions and contains much that is apocryphal, or at least wildly inaccurate ...."

Although Ford puts together a lengthy and detailed entry on Earth during the 15 years he is stranded there, the editors cut it down to two words: "Mostly harmless." In So Long, and Thanks for All the Fish, he is stunned to see his entire original work restored during a database update, even though he saw the planet being demolished by the Vogons. The change turns out to be necessary because another Earth has been pulled into existence from a parallel universe by dolphins in order to prevent humans from becoming extinct.

The Guide can receive updates to its data base via Sub-Etha. Field researchers (like Ford Prefect) can also use the Guide to edit entries and transmit these back to the publisher.

== Publisher ==
At the start of the series, the Guide was published by Megadodo Publications, one of the "great publishing corporations of Ursa Minor." When Megadodo was bought out by Infinidim Enterprises in Mostly Harmless, the new editor in chief, Vann Harl, changed the Guide's demographic from penniless hitchhikers to families in billions of billions of alternate worlds, thus altering the Guide's original purpose. When Ford learned of this plan, he knocked out Vann Harl and stole his Ident-I-Eeze card to increase the spending limit on Ford's own Dine-O-Charge card. Ford was thus able to use his Dine-O-Charge to buy (among other things): a pink spaceship, all the foie gras in London, and The London Zoo, in addition to buying the hotel he was staying at for the concierge, all charged to the Guide and Infinidim Enterprises.

== Physical description ==
In the radio series, Ford describes the Guide as "a sort of electronic book", with several million entries.

In the first book, Ford's copy of the Guide is described as looking "rather like a largish electronic calculator" and "insanely complicated", with "about a hundred tiny flat press buttons and a screen about four inches square" which could display any of a million pages. The Guide reads its entries aloud in a "still quiet measured voice".

In So Long, and Thanks for All the Fish, Arthur's copy is described as resembling "a small, thin, flexible lap computer" encased in a "sturdy plastic cover" with the words "Don't Panic" inscribed on it "in large, friendly letters". Arthur's copy of the Guide is described as "battered and travelworn" by this point in the series, having survived being thrown into a river, "frozen on the glaciers of the moon of Jaglan Beta, sat on, kicked around spaceships, scuffed and generally abused".

The Guide's entries are arranged alphabetically on the screen and accessed via typing entry codes on a keyboard; "Earth" is on the same page as "Eccentrica Gallumbits, the Triple-Breasted Whore of Eroticon 6." In So Long, and Thanks for All the Fish the Guide's "current tally" of pages is said to be 5,975,509.

In the film, the Guide is depicted as a large metal book with a large screen instead of pages. This incarnation's entries are reached by voice activation (in the only example of this being shown, saying the word "Vogon" brought up the article on Vogons.)

== Personality ==
At the start, the Guide is merely an information resource, although one with a distinctly flippant and exuberant tone. Its introduction begins with the words, "Space is big. Really big. You just won't believe how vastly, hugely, mind-bogglingly big it is. I mean you may think it's a long walk down the road to the chemist, but that's just peanuts to space. Listen..."

In the fifth novel, Mostly Harmless, a new edition of the Guide, the Guide Mark II, is published that is artificially intelligent and capable of interacting with the reader. This Guide, which takes the form of a black, birdlike robot, appears pleasant and friendly but is in fact deeply malevolent and in league with the Vogons in a plot to destroy Earth. At the beginning of the sixth book in the series, And Another Thing by Eoin Colfer, this version of the Guide saves the main characters from the Grebulon destruction of Earth as part of some unknown agenda, and disappears from existence.

== Representation ==
In the original radio series, Peter Jones provided the voice for "The Book" as both the Guide itself and as the overall narrator. When speaking as the Guide, Jones's voice was electronically filtered to sound mechanical, and spoken against simple electronic music. When speaking merely as the narrator, his voice was left unfiltered.

In the television series, Jones's voice was left unfiltered for both the Guide and "general" narrations, which were accompanied by hand-drawn animations representing computer readouts. These animations often contained little jokes, such as the full text of the "worst poetry in the universe", the equation of 37 Earth miles as "1 Altairian long way", the inclusion of a topping of meringue on a Magrathea-constructed planet, and the outcome of an intergalactic war represented as a video game score.

The 2005 film, which featured Stephen Fry as the narrator/Guide, also employed animations, but in a more minimalist, abstract style. They were animated by Shynola.

An illustrated 42nd anniversary edition of the book featured illustrations by Chris Riddell, often used to accompany Guide entries.

== Inspiration ==
Adams conceived of the Guide while hitchhiking from London to Istanbul in 1971. Drunk and penniless in a field in Innsbruck, Austria, Adams looked up at the stars and then at his stolen copy of Hitch-hiker's Guide to Europe and thought that someone should write The Hitchhiker's Guide to the Galaxy. The Hitch-hiker's Guide to Europe claimed in its introduction that it was possible to survive in Europe on less than US$25 a week, a claim echoed in the catchphrase of the Hitchhiker's Guide to the Galaxy that it was the best source of advice for those who wanted to see the universe "on less than 30 Altairian dollars a day."

== In reality ==
Douglas Adams, who was deeply involved with computer technology, founded the website h2g2 in 1999. In keeping with the Hitchhiker's Guide's tradition of being edited by random people off the street, h2g2 is an encyclopedia edited by thousands of contributors. The site's creation predates Wikipedia by two years, though several commentators have noted the similarities between Wikipedia and the Hitchhiker's Guide, particularly its wild variance in reliability and quality and its tendency to focus on topics of interest to its writers.

In 2000 Adams wrote:

When I originally described The Hitchhiker's Guide to the Galaxy, over twenty years ago, I was only joking. I didn't see myself as a predictive kind of science fiction writer, like Arthur C. Clarke who more or less single-handedly invented the communications satellite. The Guide was just a narrative device which allowed me to run off at tangents whenever the story seemed to be getting a bit dull.

But it turns out that I, inadvertently, had a terribly good idea. The Guide was compiled by researchers roaming round the galaxy, beaming their copy in, which was then instantly available to anybody to read. Over, believe it or not, something called the SubEthaNet.

Well, more or less.

I really didn't foresee the Internet. But then, neither did the computer industry. Not that that tells us very much of course - the computer industry didn't even foresee that the century was going to end.

But I did have the inkling of an idea that a collaborative guide, one that was written and kept up to date by the people who used it, in real time, might be a neat idea. I just didn't really realise that such a thing might be possible in my lifetime or how powerful such a thing might be.

We're gradually beginning to get some tiny, tiny inkling of how powerful a networked community sharing information really could become.

— Douglas Adams, My Vision for h2g2

Some have compared Apple's iPad and Amazon's Kindle to the Hitchhiker's Guide; indeed fans have designed "Don't Panic" covers for both.

Combining tablets or e-readers with Wikipedia is often considered the closest existing equivalent to the Hitchhiker's Guide to date. An app for the iPad allows users to read Guide entries as they appeared in the various Hitchhikers media.

== See also ==
- Encyclopedia Galactica
