= Encyclopedia Galactica =

Fictional encyclopedias in science-fiction

Encyclopedia Galactica is the name of a number of fictional or hypothetical encyclopedias containing all the knowledge accumulated by a galaxy-spanning civilization, most notably in Isaac Asimov's Foundation series. The concept of a "future encyclopedia" has become "something iconic among many lovers of the science fiction", and has been reused by numerous other writers.

== Asimov's Encyclopedia Galactica ==
Encyclopedia Galactica first appeared in Isaac Asimov's short story "Foundation" (Astounding Science Fiction, May 1942) (although it did not originally use that name, being referred to as the Encyclopedia until the later publication of the fix-up Foundation (1951)). Asimov's Encyclopedia Galactica was a compendium of all knowledge then available in the Galactic Empire, intended to preserve that knowledge in a remote region of the galaxy in the event of a foreseen galactic catastrophe. The Encyclopedia is later revealed to be an element in an act of misdirection, with its real purpose being to concentrate a group of knowledgeable scientists on a remote, resource-poor planet named Terminus, with the long-term aim of revitalizing the technologically stagnant and scientifically dormant empire. Originally published in a physical medium, it later becomes computerized and subject to continual change.

Asimov used the Encyclopedia Galactica as a literary device throughout his Foundation series, beginning many of the book sections or chapters with a short extract from the Encyclopedia as epigraphs, discussing a key character or event in the story. This provides the reader with a hazy idea of what is to come.

Theodore Wein considers the Encyclopedia Galactica as possibly inspired by a reference in H. G. Wells's The Shape of Things to Come (1933). The future world envisioned by Wells includes an "Encyclopaedic organization which centres upon Barcelona, with seventeen million active workers" and which is tasked with creating "the Fundamental Knowledge System which accumulates, sorts, keeps in order and renders available everything that is known". As pointed out by Wein, this Wells book was at its best-known and most influential in the late 1930s – coinciding with "the period of incubation" when the young Asimov became interested in science fiction, reading a lot of it and starting to formulate his own ideas.

Patricio Manns analyzed the Encyclopedia Galactica as a paratextual element of Asimov's work, intended to contextualize the action, to bring the trilogy closer to the historical novel and to inform the reader about a possible palimpsestic reading.

== Later instances in fiction ==
Various authors in addition to Isaac Asimov have invoked the Encyclopedia Galactica. According to the Historical Dictionary of Science Fiction, the first to use the term was Frank Holby in his short story "The Strange Case of the Missing Hero" in the July 1942 issue of Astounding Science Fiction, which features Sebastian Lelong, editor of the Encyclopedia Galactica. An Encyclopedia Galactica was a common fixture in previous incarnations of the Legion of Super-Heroes comic books, and has appeared in the Star Wars expanded universe and Superman comics set in the future.

The Encyclopedia Galactica is mentioned as a collection of all the knowledge of a galactic Empire in the 1989 science fiction short story "The Originist" by American novelist Orson Scott Card, which is set in Asimov's "Foundation" Universe. Robert A. Heinlein mentioned the Encyclopedia in chapter three of To Sail Beyond the Sunset (1987): "... the computer that led the Lunar Revolution on time line three, code 'Neil Armstrong.' Let's skip the details; it's all in Encyclopedia Galacta (sic) and other books." In Arthur C. Clarke's and Gentry Lee's novel Rama II (1989), Nicole des Jardins says to Richard Wakefield, "Just think, the sum of everything all human beings know or have ever known might be nothing more than an infinitesimal fraction of the Encyclopedia Galactica." Encyclopedia Galactica is also mentioned by Charlie Sheen's character in The Arrival (1996), and by Jodie Foster's character in Contact (1997).

In the comic science fiction series by Douglas Adams, the Galactica is frequently contrasted with the apparently more popular Hitchhiker's Guide to the Galaxy:

In many of the more relaxed civilizations on the Outer Eastern Rim of the Galaxy, the Hitchhiker’s Guide has already supplanted the great Encyclopaedia Galactica as the standard repository of all knowledge and wisdom, for though it has many omissions and contains much that is apocryphal, or at least wildly inaccurate, it scores over the older, more pedestrian work in two important respects.

First, it is slightly cheaper; and second, it has the words "DON'T PANIC" inscribed in large friendly letters on its cover.

— Douglas Adams, The Hitchhiker's Guide to the Galaxy (1979)

The Orion's Arm worldbuilding project uses a fictional database called the Encyclopaedia Galactica as its primary framing device, each page presenting itself as an individual article of the Encyclopaedia and focusing on a specific aspect of the Orion's Arm universe.

== Other uses ==
A series of five video documentaries produced by York Films of England and distributed by Encyclopædia Britannica (Australia) in 1993 were collectively titled Encyclopædia Galactica; episode titles were "The Inner Solar System", "The Outer Solar System", "Star Trekking", "Discovery", and "Astronomy and the Stars". Other entities associated with the production of the video series were Encyclopædia Britannica Educational Corporation, The Learning Channel (retitled Amazing Space), The Discovery Channel Europe, S4C Wales, System TV France and Yleisradio Finland.

An Encyclopedia Galactica: from the Fleet Library aboard the Battlestar Galactica was published in 1978. Aimed at a juvenile audience, it was a tie-in to the Battlestar Galactica television series being broadcast at the time.

The term has been used in non-fictional contexts as well. One example is its use by Carl Sagan in his 1980 book Cosmos, and the 12th episode of his documentary of the same name, to refer to a text where hypothetical extraterrestrial civilizations could store all of their information and knowledge.

== See also ==
- Future history
- Interplanetary Internet
- Library of Trantor
- Recorded history
- Web archiving
