= The Hitchhiker's Guide to the Galaxy (radio series) =

UK sci-fi comedy radio series, 1978–2018

- The cover of the booklet included with the Collector's Edition CD set release of the first two Hitchhiker's radio series.
- Genre: Comic science fiction
- Running time: 30 minutes
- Country of origin: United Kingdom
- Home station: BBC Radio 4
- Syndicates: NPR, CBC Radio, BFBS
- Starring: Simon Jones; Geoffrey McGivern; Mark Wing-Davey; Susan Sheridan; Stephen Moore
- Created by: Douglas Adams
- Written by: Douglas Adams (Series 1–2); John Lloyd (co-writer Series 1); Dirk Maggs (Series 3–6)
- Produced by: Simon Brett (Pilot); Geoffrey Perkins (Series 1–2); Bruce Hyman (Series 3–5); Dirk Maggs (Series 3–6); Helen Chattwell (Series 3–6); David Morley (Series 6)
- Narrated by: Peter Jones (Series 1–2); William Franklyn (Series 3–5); John Lloyd (Series 6)
- Original release: 8 March 1978 – 12 April 2018
- No. of episodes: 32
- Audio format: Stereo, surround
- Opening theme: "Journey of the Sorcerer" by the Eagles
- Website: bbc.co.uk/radio4/hitchhikers/

The Hitchhiker's Guide to the Galaxy is a science fiction comedy radio series primarily written by Douglas Adams. It was originally broadcast in the United Kingdom by BBC Radio 4 in 1978, and afterwards the BBC World Service, National Public Radio in the US and CBC Radio in Canada. The series was the first radio comedy programme to be produced in stereo, and was innovative in its use of music and sound effects, winning a number of awards.

The series follows the adventures of hapless Englishman Arthur Dent and his friend Ford Prefect, an alien who writes for The Hitchhiker's Guide to the Galaxy, a pan-galactic encyclopaedia and travel guide. After Earth is destroyed in the first episode, Arthur and Ford find themselves aboard a stolen spaceship piloted by Zaphod Beeblebrox (Ford's semi-cousin and Galactic President), depressed robot Marvin, and Trillian, the only other human survivor of Earth's destruction.

A pilot programme was commissioned in March 1977, and was recorded by the end of the following June. A second series was commissioned in 1979, transmitted in 1980. Episodes of the first series were re-recorded for release on LP records and audio cassettes and Adams adapted the first series into a best-selling novel in 1979. After the 1980 transmissions of the second radio series, a second novel was published and the first series was adapted for television. This was followed by three further novels, a computer game, and various other media.

Adams considered writing a third radio series to be based on his novel Life, the Universe and Everything in 1993, but the project did not begin until after his death in 2001. Dirk Maggs, with whom Adams had discussed the new series, directed and co-produced the radio adaptation as well as adaptations of the remaining Hitchhiker's Guide novels So Long, and Thanks for All the Fish and Mostly Harmless. These became the third, fourth and fifth radio series, transmitted in 2004 and 2005. A sixth series, adapting Eoin Colfer's sixth part in the "trilogy", And Another Thing... was broadcast in March 2018.

== Development ==
=== Early development ===
Douglas Adams had contributed comedy sketches for BBC radio programmes produced by Simon Brett (including The Burkiss Way and Week Ending), and was asked to pitch a radio sitcom in February 1977. Adams initially "came up with various ideas and various permutations of people living in bedsits and this sort of thing" as this "seemed to be what most situation comedies tended to be about." Adams said in an interview that when Brett proposed a radio science fiction comedy series, he "fell off his chair...because it was what I'd been fighting for all these years". Adams wrote his first outlines the same month.

Originally to be called "The Ends of the Earth", each episode would have ended with the planet Earth meeting its demise in a different way. While writing the first episode, Adams realised that he needed a character who knew what was going to happen to Earth before the other characters, and therefore made this character an alien. Adams remembered a title he came up with while lying drunk in a field in Innsbruck, Austria in 1971, and decided that this character would be a "roving reporter" for The Hitchhiker's Guide to the Galaxy, a pan-galactic encyclopaedia and travel guide. Recollections by his friends at the time indicate that Adams first spoke of the idea of "hitchhiking around the galaxy" while on holiday in Greece in 1973.

As the first episode's writing progressed, the Guide became the central focus of his story, and Adams decided to base the whole series around it, with the initial destruction of Earth being the only holdover from the "Ends of the Earth" proposal. In Adams' outline, the character of Arthur Dent was called "Aleric B", the joke being that the audience initially assume the character is also an alien rather than a human. Adams renamed the character for the pilot to "Arthur Dent". Adams' biographer M. J. Simpson suggested that the character was almost certainly named after the 17th century puritan writer Arthur Dent, author of The Plain Man's Pathway to Heaven first published in 1601, although Adams himself claimed no recollection of consciously choosing the name.

=== Pilot and commissioning ===
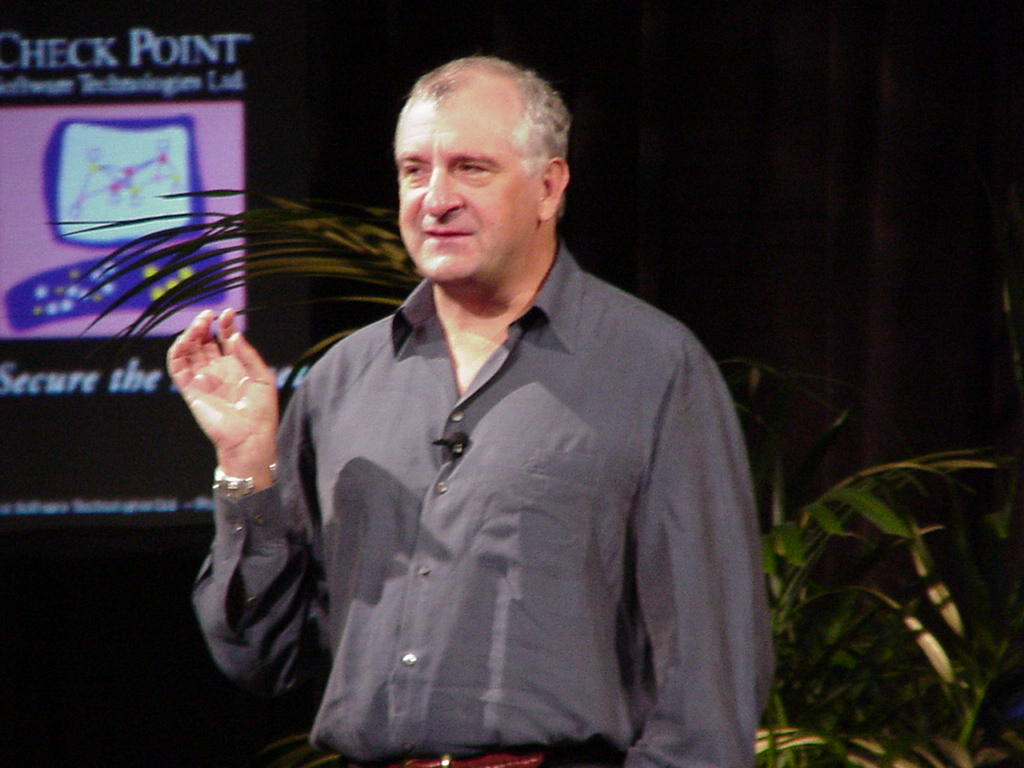
Douglas Adams in 2000

A pilot episode was commissioned on 1 March 1977 and the recording was completed on 28 June 1977. Brett and Adams recounted different parts of the pilot episode's genesis, including convincing the BBC that such a programme could not be recorded with a studio audience and should be recorded in stereo sound. Since at the time only BBC Radio Drama programmes were allowed to be recorded in stereo, Hitchhiker's was briefly classified internally as a drama instead of a comedy.

A full series of six episodes (five new episodes, plus the pilot) was commissioned on 31 August 1977. As Brett had since left the BBC and Adams had been commissioned to write a four-part Doctor Who serial ("The Pirate Planet"), the final five episodes in the first series were produced by Geoffrey Perkins.

With conflicting writing commitments, Adams engaged his friend and flatmate John Lloyd to assist in writing the fifth and sixth episodes. The second episode was produced in November 1977. The script of the last episode of the first series (later retitled "The Primary Phase") was completed in February 1978, and production (including sound mixing and effects) was completed on 3 March 1978.

=== Casting ===
Adams wrote the main parts of Arthur Dent and Ford Prefect with actors Simon Jones and Geoffrey McGivern in mind. According to Jones, Adams telephoned him when he was writing the pilot to ask whether he would essentially play himself; Adams later stated that although Dent was not a portrayal of Jones, he wrote the part to play to Jones's strengths as an actor.

The radio series (and the LP and TV versions) featured narration by comedy actor Peter Jones as "The Book". He was cast after a three-month search for an actor with sonorous, avuncular tones who sounded like Jones, after which the producers hired Jones himself. Following another actor dropping out of the production, Bill Wallis was called in at short notice to play two parts, Mr. Prosser and Vogon Jeltz. One character appearing in the pilot who was dropped from subsequent incarnations of the story was Lady Cynthia, an aristocrat who helps demolish Dent's house, played by another ex-Cambridge Footlights actress, Jo Kendall.

The pilot featured only a small cast of characters, and following its commission into a series there was a need for additional characters. Many actors were picked for their roles in previous series; Mark Wing-Davey had played a character in The Glittering Prizes "who took advantage of people and was very trendy", making him suitable for the role of Zaphod, according to Adams. Richard Vernon, noted for his portrayal of "grandfatherly types", was chosen as Slartibartfast. Other characters included Susan Sheridan as Trillian and Stephen Moore as Marvin.

== First and second radio series ==
=== Plot ===
Earthman Arthur Dent learns his house is about to be demolished to make way for a new road. His friend Ford Prefect informs him that the planet is about to be demolished by a Vogon constructor fleet "to make way for a hyperspace bypass", and that Ford is in fact an alien writer for The Hitchhiker's Guide to the Galaxy, a pan-galactic encyclopaedia and travel guide. Hitching a ride aboard the Vogon ship which has just destroyed Earth, the pair are ejected and then find themselves aboard a stolen spaceship, The Heart of Gold. On board is Ford's semi-cousin and President of the Galaxy, Zaphod Beeblebrox; a woman Arthur met at a party, Tricia "Trillian" McMillan; and a depressed robot, Marvin. Beeblebrox is searching for the mythical planet of Magrathea, where Arthur meets Slartibartfast and learns the answer to the "Ultimate Question of Life, the Universe and Everything", which it turns out is "42". Arthur and the others find themselves at the Restaurant at the End of the Universe, then held captive aboard a Golgafrincham ship about to crash-land on prehistoric Earth.

In series two, Zaphod begins a secret mission by attempting to contact an editor of The Guide, but is captured by government forces from the Frogstar, "the most totally evil place in the Galaxy". After surviving the Total Perspective Vortex on Frogstar World B, Zaphod returns to The Heart of Gold and rescues Arthur and Ford from prehistoric Earth. When the Heart of Gold is attacked by Vogons pursuing the surviving Earthlings, the ghost of Zaphod’s great-great-grandfather transports the ship to Brontitall, a planet populated by a race of bird people. Separated by falling off a giant statue depicting Arthur, they hear about the rudest word in the universe and the Shoe Event Horizon. Escaping using a 900-year-old spaceship, the three find themselves in the offices of the Guide editor, Zarniwoop, and we discover that it was Zaphod who accidentally signed off the Earth for destruction.

=== Production ===
The recording session of Fit the Seventh at the BBC's Paris Theatre recording studio; from left David Tate, Alan Ford, Geoffrey McGivern, Douglas Adams, Mark Wing-Davey, Simon Jones

One of Adams's stated goals was to be experimental in the use of sound. Being a fan of Pink Floyd and the Beatles, and especially the experimental concept albums both bands produced in the late 1960s and early 1970s, Adams wanted the programme to have the feel of a "rock album ... to convey the idea that you actually were on a spaceship or an alien planet—that sense of a huge aural landscape". The first series was the first BBC radio comedy to use stereophonic techniques. Adams later said that before Hitchhiker's, stereo was deemed impossible for radio comedy and after it was made compulsory. Producer Geoffrey Perkins recalled that the technology available in 1978 for mixing sound effects at the BBC's Paris Theatre radio studio was limited. The production had one eight track tape recorder at their disposal and so many of the effects in the programme were mixed "live" with tape loops of background sound effects strung around the recording studio. Actors whose speech needed to be modified in post-production by radiophonic technicians, such as Stephen Moore's performance as Marvin the Android, were recorded in isolation from the main "humanoid" characters. Moore recorded most of his performance in a cupboard and met the other actors only after the first session was complete.

Sound and effects were created by Paddy Kingsland, Dick Mills and Harry Parker of the BBC Radiophonic Workshop. Several of the sound effects recorded by Dick Mills for the first series were released on the album BBC Sound Effects No. 26 – Sci-Fi Sound Effects. Other BBC staff members who worked on the first two radio series included Alick Hale-Munro (chief sound engineer) and Anne Ling (production secretary) and the "Technical Team" is given as: Paul Hawdon, Lisa Braun (studio manager), Colin Duff (studio manager), Eric Young, Martha Knight, Max Alcock and John Whitehall.

The first radio series (first six episodes) was broadcast on BBC Radio 4 in March and April 1978. A seventh episode was broadcast on 24 December 1978. This seventh episode was commonly known as the Christmas Episode. This had nothing to do with Christmas except in an early draft (which would have had Marvin the Paranoid Android as the "star" that was followed by the Three Wise Men).

Production on the second series was delayed several times. While Adams was meant to be working on scripts for a stage adaptation of Hitchhiker's in April 1979, he was also employed as Script Editor for Doctor Who and turned down an offer from John Lloyd to submit material for Not the Nine O'Clock News. The recording on the first day scheduled for the second radio series, 19 May 1979, was left incomplete because Adams had not yet finished the script. Further scheduled recordings on 11 July and 1 August of that year were also cancelled, this time due in part to Adams trying to work on the LP re-recordings of the first series, as well as its novelisation.

Further recording attempts were made on 23 October and 3 December. The recording of the final episode in the second series was completed on 13 January 1980: the audio mixing of the episode was not finished until 25 January, the day it was transmitted. The tape "arrived just a few minutes before transmission". The final five episodes, completing the second radio series, were broadcast in January 1980.

=== Music ===
The theme tune used for the radio series (and all subsequent adaptations) is "Journey of the Sorcerer", an instrumental piece composed by Bernie Leadon and recorded by the Eagles on their album One of These Nights. Adams chose this song for its futuristic-sounding nature, but also for the fact that it had a banjo in it, which, as Geoffrey Perkins recalls, Adams said would give it an "on the road, hitch-hiking feel".

Adams also wanted to incorporate music from a variety of pop, rock and classical artists. Series one ("The Primary Phase") included an eclectic range of modern classical, experimental rock and electronic music. The Hitchhiker's Guide to the Galaxy: The Original Radio Scripts lists works including A Modern Mass for the Dead (Requiem) by György Ligeti, A Rainbow in Curved Air by Terry Riley, Volumina by György Ligeti, "Wind on Water" by Robert Fripp and Brian Eno, Poppy Nogood and the Phantom Band by Terry Riley, Cachaca by Patrick Moraz, "Shine On You Crazy Diamond" (intro) by Pink Floyd, "Rock and Roll Music" by The Beatles, Also sprach Zarathustra (intro) by Richard Strauss, Katakomben by Gruppe Between, Space Theme by Stomu Yamashta, Oxygène by Jean Michel Jarre, "That's Entertainment!" by Howard Dietz and Arthur Schwartz, "Over Fire Island" by Eno, Miracles of the Gods by Absolute Elsewhere, Mikrophoniet by Karlheinz Stockhausen, Melodien by György Ligeti, The Engulfed Cathedral by Isao Tomita, Volkstanz by Gruppe Between, and "What a Wonderful World" by Louis Armstrong.

This diverse range of music was only featured during the first series due to the difficulty in obtaining rights for commercial releases (leading to episodes of the first series being remade as an LP album without the licensed background music in 1979). For series two Paddy Kingsland was commissioned to provide background music and for the third to fifth series Paul 'Wix' Wickens was chosen.

=== International broadcasts and repeats ===
The series was first broadcast on BBC Radio 4 at 10.30pm on Wednesday 8 March 1978. Simon Jones recalled that Adams was initially disappointed at the scheduling as the timeslot was allegedly guaranteed to turn a programme into a "cult" (i.e. a small but dedicated listenership). As it happened, the programme gained listeners through the lack of any competition elsewhere on television or radio, but primarily through word of mouth; several Sunday newspapers included reviews and it was mentioned in Radio 4's Pick of the Week. As a result of its exposure through these reviews, the BBC received numerous requests for a repeat from people who had missed the initial episodes. A repeat of the series was broadcast on 23 April, only two weeks after the last episode had aired.

In the end, the complete first series was rebroadcast twice by the BBC in 1978 and once in 1979, as well as on the BBC World Service. The complete second series was rebroadcast once in 1980, and the complete original run of 12 episodes was broadcast twice over a twelve-week period, once from April to June 1981 and the second time from the end of March to the start of June 1983.

Broadcasting by National Public Radio in the United States followed in March 1981 with a repeat broadcast in September. This was one of their first transmissions in stereo. The following year, 1982, the series was carried by CBC Radio (Canadian Broadcasting Corporation). A German radio version of the first six radio episodes, Per Anhalter ins All was transmitted in 1981 and the twelve original radio episodes have been translated and transmitted in Finland, France, The Netherlands and Sweden.

All of the episodes, including those completed after Adams's death, are referred to as "Fits" after Lewis Carroll's "The Hunting of the Snark: an Agony in Eight Fits". In 1981, upon a rebroadcast of the twelve episodes of the first two series, it was decided that the Christmas episode, which previously had no episode number, would be called "Fit the Seventh" and the episodes in the second series, which had first been billed as Fit the First to Fit the Fifth (representing five parts of the second series) would become Fit the Eighth to Fit the Twelfth.

== Reception and awards ==
The first series was noted for its unusual concept, out-of-context parodies, "semantic and philosophical jokes", compressed prose and "groundbreaking deployment of sound effects and voice techniques".

The programme was a hit with listeners, although a BBC World Service listener in India allegedly "strongly objected to 'Robots taking part in a comedy show'" and another in Sierra Leone thought that "as a source of information it is misleading". One listener complained to the Radio Times that "In just about 50 years of radio and latterly TV listening and watching, this strikes me as the most fatuous, inane, childish, pointless, codswallopping drivel ... It is not even remotely funny".

BBC Radio 3's Critics Forum thought the show had "the sort of effect that a Monty Python programme actually has, of making everything that appears immediately after it on radio or television or whatever, seem absolutely ludicrous". By the time the sixth episode was broadcast, the show had become a cult hit.

The success of the series encouraged Adams to adapt it into a novel, which was based on the first four Fits and released in the second week of October 1979. While the second radio series was being recorded in 1979, Adams was commissioned to deliver a pilot script for a television adaptation, which, after a number of delays, was delivered by 1981. The storyline set out by the initial radio series has since appeared in numerous formats including a 1984 computer game and a 2005 feature film.

The original series was the recipient of a number of awards including the Imperial Tobacco Award (1978), The Sony Award (1979), The Society of Authors/Pye Awards Best Programme for Young People (1980) and the Mark Time Awards 'Grand Master Award' (Adams) and 'Hall of Fame' (1998). It was the only radio show ever to be nominated for the Hugo science fiction awards, in 1979, in the 'Best Dramatic Presentation' category.

As a result of the series, Douglas Adams was inducted into the Radio Academy's Hall of Fame.

== Third, fourth and fifth radio series ==
=== Announcement ===
In November 2003, two years after Adams's death and 23 years after the production on the Secondary Phase had ceased, a new radio adaptation of Adams' unadapted novel Life, the Universe and Everything was announced. This would become the third series of the Hitchhiker's Guide to the Galaxy on radio. Dirk Maggs, a friend of Adams, was chosen to create, direct and co-produce the adaptations. Maggs had previously consulted with Adams on potential radio adaptations for the three remaining books in 1993 and 1997. The project was restarted in September 2001 by Maggs, Helen Chattwell and Bruce Hyman, with help from Jane Belson and Ed Victor.

At the time of the announcement, it was stated that the original goal was to transmit the six-part adaptation of the third novel starting in February 2004, with the remaining eight episodes comprising the final two novels. A fourth and fifth series based on So Long, and Thanks For All the Fish and Mostly Harmless were to have been transmitted in September 2004.

Soon after the six episodes comprising the third series had been recorded by Above the Title Productions, a minor legal dispute over the online availability of episodes arose between the production company and The Walt Disney Company, which had started production on the Hitchhiker's film, also in 2003. This led to a delay in transmitting the third series and an immediate cessation in the production of series four and five. Eventually a deal was worked out, and the Tertiary Phase was first broadcast on BBC Radio 4 on 21 September 2004.

=== Adaptation ===
Maggs stated in the series' script book that he felt bound by his promise to Douglas Adams to allow the scripts of the Tertiary Phase to closely follow the plot of the third book: "I myself was willing to give the Tertiary Phase 7 out of 10 on the grounds that I was a little too reverential to the text and the pace suffered as a result." But in adapting the final two novels, the only instructions Maggs got from Adams was "They don't need more than four episodes each." Thus Maggs was able to use many of the major plot elements of the final two books (though not necessarily in the same order), and attempt to reconnect plot threads from all five radio series.

The new episodes reunited most of the living original cast. The parts of The Book, Eddie the Computer and Slartibartfast were recast to replace actors who had died, with William Franklyn, Roger Gregg and Richard Griffiths taking over these three roles, respectively. Peter Jones, the original narrator, had died in 2000; Richard Vernon, the original Slartibartfast, had died in 1997; and David Tate, who had voiced Eddie the Computer (among many other roles), had died in 1996.

Bill Wallis, who played Mr. Prosser and Prostetnic Vogon Jeltz in the original series, was unavailable, and Toby Longworth took the role of Jeltz in the new series. John Marsh, who had been the continuity announcer for Fits the Second to Twelfth, was rehired to reprise this role. There was also a posthumous cameo role by Adams as Agrajag, edited from his BBC audiobook recording of the novel.

=== Plot ===
In series 3, after the events of series 2 are revealed to be a hallucination, Arthur Dent and Ford Prefect find themselves again stuck on prehistoric Earth. After being rescued, they find themselves transported to Lord's Cricket Ground just before it is destroyed by 11 white robots. Slartibartfast teaches Dent how cricket is based on the history of the worst wars in the galaxy, and the pair travel to Krikkit in order to prevent another war. In the final part, Dent and Trillian meet the computer behind the Supernova Bomb and there is another attempt to find the Ultimate Question to Life, the Universe and Everything.

In the fourth series, Dent discovers that Earth has been recreated and meets Fenchurch, the woman of his dreams. Meanwhile, a spaceship lands in Knightsbridge, God's Last Message to his Creation is discovered, and Marvin expires. In the fifth series, a tenth planet in the Solar System is discovered and Ford discovers that The Guide has become a much more sinister place to work. Arthur Dent discovers that he is a father. His daughter, Random, flies to Earth on a stolen spaceship. All of the human protagonists are reunited on Earth as the planet is destroyed again, now definitively. The fate of the characters is less certain; three potential endings are offered.

=== Broadcast ===
The third series ran on BBC Radio 4 from Tuesday 21 September to 26 October 2004, with repeats on the following Thursdays. The series was also streamed in RealPlayer and Windows Media formats (including versions in a 5.1 surround mix) which were made available on Radio 4's website until the following Thursday. In another continuity nod, the term "Fit" is still used in place of "episode"; episodes of the third series were subtitled Fits the Thirteenth to Eighteenth.

The six-part "Tertiary Phase" was broadcast in September and October 2004. The four-part "Quandary Phase" was broadcast in May 2005, and the four-part "Quintessential Phase" was broadcast immediately following, in May and June 2005. The names for these series were chosen because they sound "less daunting, more memorable and are a bit easier to spell" than the standard terms quaternary and quinary.

== Sixth radio series ==
A six episode series dubbed the "Hexagonal Phase" was broadcast on BBC Radio 4 beginning on 8 March 2018, exactly 40 years after the first series' initial broadcast in 1978, and concluding 12 April 2018. The series is based on the sixth novel And Another Thing... by Eoin Colfer and adapted by the director Dirk Maggs who included some dialogue and material based on unfinished ideas in Adams's papers. Dirk Maggs produced the series which features members of the original radio and television casts.

== Media releases ==
The first two series were first released on record (as broadcast radio in 1979), audio cassette (revised from radio) and CD in 1988, marking the tenth anniversary of the first broadcast of the first episode. These were the first programmes of any kind released on CD by the BBC Radio Collection. The two radio series were known simply as "the first series" and "the second series" until 1992 when the BBC made its first re-release in separate boxes as "The Primary Phase" and "The Secondary Phase". The episodes were released with those titles in 1993, and again in 1998, for the series' twentieth anniversary. In 2001, they became the first programmes of any kind re-released by the BBC Radio Collection in an MP3-CD format.

A three-CD set of the Tertiary Phase was released in mid-October 2004, before the final episodes were broadcast. These CDs contain extended material, previously cut to make 27-minute episodes for radio. A two-CD set of the Quandary Phase was released at the end of May 2005, and a two-CD set of the Quintessential Phase was released at the end of June 2005. Both sets again include material that was originally cut for reasons of timing. The sixth series is scheduled for release on CD on 13 April 2018.

A script book for the final fourteen episodes was released in July 2005. The book is entitled The Hitchhiker's Guide to the Galaxy Radio Scripts: The Tertiary, Quandary and Quintessential Phases. Dirk Maggs writes in his introduction that the "book is a companion volume to The Original Radio Scripts...."

A box set entitled The Hitchhiker's Guide to the Galaxy: The Complete Radio Series was released on 3 October 2005. It contains fifteen CDs, subdivided per radio series, and bonus material exclusive to the box set. BBC Audio released a DVD version of the Tertiary Phase, featuring that series in 5.1 surround sound, in October 2006. Contrary to previous announcements, this was merely a DVD-Video disc with Dolby Digital sound and other features, rather than a DVD-Audio disc. While it had been stated that BBC Audio plans on also releasing the fourth and fifth radio series on DVD, no dates have been set.

=== Special editions ===
Special editions of the Primary and Secondary Phases were released in November 2008. These have, according to the BBC, been given "a thorough clean-up and remaster" by Dirk Maggs. This includes using the new Philip Pope signature tune, so the material can be released worldwide, which has required John Marsh to re-record his announcements so they could be mixed in. Cleaning up the recordings aims to reduce the hiss produced by the overdubbing in the original and also re-levelling the episodes to produce a greater clarity in the sound.

According to the inlay which comes with the Special Edition, all previous CD editions of the Primary & Secondary Phases played back slightly fast due to capstan wear on the mastering tape machine, with the result that the audio was pitch-shifted up by half a semitone. That was corrected for the special editions and has the effect of making each episode nearly a minute longer.

=== Commercial rights issues ===
A scene from Fit the Third was cut from commercially released recordings of the radio series because it featured copyrighted music that could not be cleared. In the scene Marvin "hums" like Pink Floyd, using the opening to "Shine On You Crazy Diamond", then "sings" "Rock and Roll Music" by The Beatles, and finally the theme music from 2001: A Space Odyssey, the opening "Sunrise" movement from Richard Strauss's Also sprach Zarathustra. It would have been very cost prohibitive in the 1980s to get clearances to release a recording of Fit the Third with this music, though agreements were reached on the rest of the copyrighted music used during the first series. As a result, all commercial recordings of Fit the Third are about two minutes shorter than other episodes. Recordings of the original radio broadcasts still contain it.

For the CD and cassette releases of the Tertiary Phase in the United States, and all CD and cassette releases of the Quandary and Quintessential Phases, the instrumental title theme, "Journey of the Sorcerer", composed by Bernie Leadon and originally recorded by US rock band the Eagles, was re-interpreted by The Illegal Eagles, a tribute band, using an arrangement by Philip Pope. This was done for licensing reasons (though the original track was used for the original radio transmissions and the on-demand downloads). In a 2005 interview with Simon Jones, the use of this song was mentioned as a major cause for the delay in releasing recordings of the new series in the United States.
