= Sheila Finch =

English novelist (born 1935)

- Born: October 29, 1935 (age 90); London, England
- Education: Bishop Otter College (BA); Indiana University Bloomington (MA)
- Occupation: Author
- Spouse: Clare Grill Rayner (m. 1957; div. 1980)
- Children: 3
- Writing career
- Genres: Science fiction; fantasy
- Website: sheilafinch.net

Sheila Finch (born 29 October 1935) is an author of science fiction and fantasy. She is best known for her sequence of stories about the Guild of Xenolinguists.

== Biography ==
Sheila Finch was born on 29 October 1935 in London, England. She attended Bishop Otter College (now Chichester University) from 1954 to 1956, then taught for a year (1956–1957) in a primary school in Hackney, London. Following her marriage to Clare Grill Rayner in 1957 (divorced 1980), she emigrated to the US and completed her BA in English Literature at Indiana University Bloomington in 1959, followed by an MA in linguistics and medieval history in 1962. She has three daughters. From 1963 to 1967, when the family lived in San Luis Obispo, California, she taught part-time at Cuesta College and began publishing poetry. The family moved to Long Beach in 1967. Sheila taught creative writing and science fiction at El Camino College from 1970 to 2005. The family relocated for two years to Munich, Germany in the 1970s, where Sheila studied German and taught English as a second language.

She is a member of the Science Fiction and Fantasy Writers Association, serving as Vice-President for two years, then Chair of the Grievance Committee for five years. As Western Regional Director, during the 1980s and 1990s she organized activities for the organization aboard the Queen Mary in Long Beach Harbor. She is also a charter member of the Asilomar Writers Consortium, founded by Jerry Hannah in Monterey, California in 1976.

Besides teaching and publishing, Sheila has been active in the community, serving first as a volunteer in a residential hospice, then for ten years as a volunteer for St Luke's Episcopal Church's program for the homeless. She also served for eight years on the City of Long Beach Mayor's Advisory Committee for Homelessness.

Sheila Finch currently lives in Long Beach, California.

== Xenolinguists ==
In her 1986 book Triad, Finch used the term "xenolinguist" to describe the linguists who decode alien languages. The word has gained widespread acceptance in the science fiction industry and was used to describe the character Uhura in the remake of Star Trek.

Finch created a series of tales about communicating with aliens which eventually was consolidated in collection of short stories entitled The Guild of Xenolinguists (Golden Gryphon Press, 2007). The Guild was founded on Earth in the middle of the 22nd century after first contact with a race from somewhere in the Orion Arm of the Milky Way Galaxy. A few early linguists, neurolinguists, ethnographers and computer scientists established the Guild which then took over the responsibility for training xenolinguists to make first contact and to record alien languages in the field. Later, the Guild provided translation services for the expanding commerce and colonization of the following centuries.

== Bibliography ==
=== Novels ===
Novels
Year	Title	Publisher	ISBN	Notes
1985	Infinity's Web	New York: Bantam Books	0-553-25251-8	Compton Crook Award for best First Novel
1986	Triad	New York: Bantam Books	0-553-25792-7	
1987	The Garden of the Shaped	New York: Bantam Books	0-553-26801-5	
1989	Shaper's Legacy	New York: Bantam Books	0-553-28167-4	
1989	Shaping The Dawn	New York: Bantam Books	1434401601	
1999	Tiger in the Sky	New York: Avon Books	0-380-79971-5	San Diego Book Award for Best Juvenile Fiction
2003	Reading the Bones	Tachyon Books	1-892391-08-2	
2004	Birds	Wildside Press	0-8095-0056-6	
2017	A Villa Far From Rome	Hadley Rille Books	9780997118834	AudioBook

=== Collections ===
Collections
Year	Title	Publisher	ISBN	Notes
2007	The Guild of Xenolinguists	Golden Gryphon Press	9781930846487	
2014	Myths, Metaphors, and Science Fiction	Aqueduct Press	9781619760554	
2022	Fork Points	Aqueduct Press	9781619762183	

=== Short stories ===
Short stories
Year	Title	Originally Published In	Notes
1974	Green Liberation	Girl Scout Leader, June	
1977	The Confession of Melakos	Sou'wester, Fall	
1980	Symphony for Sarah Ann	Mississippi Valley Review	
1982	A Long Way Home	Asimov's Science Fiction, December	
1983	The Man Who Lived on the Queen Mary	Pandora, Spring	
1983	Darkness Comes Rattling	Amazing Stories, July	
1984	The Seventh Dragon	Fantasy Book, June	
1986	Reichs-peace	Hitler Victorious, ed. Gregory Benford and Martin H. Greenberg, New York: Garland	transl: Hitler Victorioso, Ediciones Destino, Spain, 1990
1987	Hitchhiker	Amazing Stories	
1988	Babel Interface	Amazing Stories, May	
1989	Ceremony After a Raid	Amazing Stories, July	
1989	A World Waiting	Fantasy and Science Fiction, August	
1989	Rembrandts of Things Past	Tarot Tales, ed. Rachel Pollack and Caitlin Matthews. London: Century Hutchinson	
1989	PAPPI	Foundation's Friends, ed. Martin H. Greenberg. New York: Tor Books, November	transl: Selected Short Science Fiction of the World, China, 2017
1989	The Old Man and C	Amazing Stories, November	Dramatic version, arr. by Jason Trucco, NY, NY, 2019
1990	Sequoia Dreams	Amazing Stories, July	
1990	Cyberella	Fantasy and Science Fiction, August	transl: Cyberella, Wilhelm Heyne Verlag, Germany 1995 Millimondi Estate, Mondadori, Italy 1991 Bli-Panika, www.space.ort.org.il, Israel 2003
1992	If There Be Cause	Amazing Stories, February	
1995	Firstborn, Seaborn	Sisters in Fantasy, ed. Susan Shwartz. ROC	
1996	Communion of Minds	Fantasy and Science Fiction, September	transl: Der Lincoln Zug, Wilhelm Heyne Verlag, Germany, 1997
1997	Out of the Mouths	Fantasy and Science Fiction, November–December	
1997	The Roaring Ground	Fantasy and Science Fiction, April	
1997	A Flight of Words	Fantasy and Science Fiction, February	transl. Galaktika XL, Metropolis Media Group Kft, Hungary 2016
1997	The Falcon and the Falconer	Tomorrow SF	
1998	Reading the Bones	Fantasy and Science Fiction, January	Nebula Award for Best Novella transl: Galaktika XL, Metropolis Media Group Kft, Hungary 2016
1998	The Naked Face of God	Fantasy and Science Fiction, June	
1999	No Brighter Glory	Fantasy and Science Fiction, April	
2000	Nor Unbuild the Cage	Fantasy and Science Fiction, September	
2002	Forkpoints	Fantasy and Science Fiction, February	
2002	Miles to Go	Fantasy and Science Fiction, June	
2003	Reach	Fantasy and Science Fiction, February	AudioBook
2004	Confessional	Fantasy and Science Fiction, January	
2004	So Good A Day	Fantasy and Science Fiction, May	
2007	First Was the Word	Fantasy and Science Fiction, June	transl: Galaktika XL, Metropolis Media Group Kft, Hungary 2016
2010	Failed Harvest	Nova SF 25	
2010	Where Two or Three	Is Anybody Out There? ed. Marty Halpern and Nick Gevers, June	
2010	The Persistence of Butterflies	2020 Visions, ed. Rick Novy	
2010	Fortune's Stepchild	Lace and Blade 3, ed. Deborah Ross	
2011	The Evening and the Morning	Fantasy and Science Fiction, March/April	
2013	A Very Small Dispensation	Asimov's SF Magazine, October/November	
2014	Burdens	Mythic Delirium, January	
2016	The Language of the Silent	Fantasy and Science Fiction, March/April	collaboration with Juliette Wade
2016	First Hunt	Hadley Rille Books, Summer	
2017	Homecoming	Seat 14C, X-Prize, June	
2018	Survivors	Asimov's Science Fiction, September/October	
2019	Talking in Pictures	Current Features, X-Prize, June	
2020	Not This Tide	Asimov's Science Fiction, January/February	
2021	Love At First Sight	Ink; Queer Sci-Fi	
2021	Czerny At Midnight	Asimov's Science Fiction, November/December	
2022	The Wine - Dark Deep	Asimov's Science Fiction, May/June	
2022	Wanton Gods	Asimov's Science Fiction,	

=== Articles and non-fiction ===
Articles and non-fiction
Year	Title	Originally Published In	Notes
1982	Fantasy as a Super-Vitamin	Patchin Review, June	
1985	The Unseen Shore: Thoughts on the Popularity of Fantasy	Journal of Popular Culture, Spring	
1985	Paradise Lost: Prison Imagery at the Heart of Le Guin's Utopia	Extrapolation, Fall	
1985	Oath of Fealty: No Thud, Some Blunders	Science Fiction Review, Winter	
1987	Science Fiction's Magical Mystery Tours	SFWA Bulletin, Spring	
1988	Berlitz in Outer Space: How Alien Communication Just Might Work	Amazing Stories, May	
1989	Oath of Fealty: A Look at Another Ambiguous Utopia	Australian Science Fiction Review, Spring	
1989	Untitled	SFWA Bulletin, Spring	
1996	The War Zone of Art: Science Fiction Writers, Publishers and the Modern Marketplace	Science Fiction and Market Realities, ed. George Slusser and Eric S. Rabkin. The University of Georgia Press	
1996	Doctor, Will the Patient Survive?	Nebula Awards 30, ed. Pamela Sargent. New York: Harcourt Brace	
1996	Teaching Science Fiction: A Writer's Concerns	inside english, March	
1996	Being Alien in Beijing	SFWA Bulletin, March	
2000	Dispatches From the Trenches: Science Fiction in the College Classroom	Extrapolation, Spring	
2000	Dreams, Truth, and Hope	Future Females, The Next Generation: New Voices and Velocities in Feminist Science Fiction, ed. Marleen Barr. Rowman & Allenheld	
2003	Creativity in the Fishbowl	SFWA Bulletin, Spring	
2004	Future Tense: Reflecting Language Change in Science Fiction	SFWA Bulletin, Spring	
2006	How to Rate a Writing Program	SFWA Bulletin, Winter	
2012	Fantastic Journeys of the Mythic Kind	James Gunn's AD ASTRA, July	
2014	Of Myth and Memory	SFWA Bulletin, Winter	
2016	Ambiguous Utopias	James Gunn's AD ASTRA, Summer	

=== Poetry ===
Poetry
Year	Title	Publisher	Notes
1973	Chichester	AAUW Journal	
1973	Izaac Mizraki	Poet Lore	
1973	Study Group	The Writer	
1973	The Eagle on the Washing Machine	Ball State Forum, Summer	2nd Place, Steven Vincent Benet Award for Narrative Poetry
1974	Evensong	Encore	
1975	In the Museum at Mesa Verde	Encore, Spring	
1975	The Hangover	Hyacinths and Biscuits	
1975	Vacation Special	Hartford Courant	
1975	Aubade in Forest Fire Season	Moving Out	
1976	War Games	Tattoes and Other Scars	
1977	Mockingbird Mantra	Encore	
1983	Message to a Friend in Another Solar System	Aurora, Winter	

== Awards ==
- "Reading the Bones" (1998) Nebula novella award winner
- Tiger in the Sky (1999) Winner of the San Diego Book Award for Best Juvenile Fiction
- Infinity's Web (1985) Winner of the Compton Crook Award for Best First Novel
