= Sheila Burrell =

English actress (1922–2011)

- Photo by David Sim
- Born: Sheila Mary Burrell; 9 May 1922; Blackheath, London, England, UK
- Died: 19 July 2011 (aged 89); Kingston upon Thames, London, England, UK
- Occupation: Actress
- Spouse(s): Laurence Payne (divorced); David Sim

Sheila Mary Burrell (9 May 1922 – 19 July 2011) was a British actress. A cousin of Laurence Olivier, she was born in Blackheath, London, the daughter of a salesman. She attended St John's, Bexhill-on-Sea and the Webber Douglas Academy of Dramatic Art, London. Her first marriage to actor Laurence Payne was dissolved and she then married David Sim, a portrait and theatre photographer. She is primarily remembered in the United States for her performance as Lady Rochford in three episodes of the television series Six Wives of Henry VIII.

== Theatre career ==
Burrell made her first appearance on the stage in 1942, playing Patsy in The Patsy, entertaining the troops, and made her first appearance in London at the Prince of Wales Theatre on 20 April 1944, as Rose in The Rest is Silence.

Subsequent theatre credits include:

- Chanticleer, June 1944, Sonja in Happily Ever After?
- Liverpool, 1944, Katherine in The Taming of the Shrew
- Arts, October 1944, Judy in The Bread-Winner
- Arts, February 1944, Rosetta in Leonce and Lena
- Chanticleer, March 1945, Maia Rubeck in When We Dead Awaken
- Arts, April 1945, Celestine in An Italian Straw Hat
- Arts, October 1947, Mrs Rosenberg in Smith
- Dundee, 1947, Bathsheba in Monathan
- Croydon and Embassy, during 1948, Louka in Arms and the Man, Gilda in Design for Living and Judy in The Shining Hour
- Dublin Gate Theatre, 1948, Abdication, The Vigil and The Mountains Look Different
- Lyric Hammersmith, March and Ambassadors' April 1949, Barbara Allen in Dark of the Moon
- Embassy, July 1949, Elizabeth in Fit for Heroes
- Touring, February 1950, as Anne Boleyn in The White Falcon
- Duchess, April 1950, Clara in The Man With the Umbrella
- Watergate, November 1950, Margot in The Typewriter
- Q Theatre, February 1951, Letticia in The Watchman
- New Boltons, April 1951, She in Happy and Glorious
- Bristol Old Vic Company, 1951–52 season, Juliette in The Traveller Without Luggage, Curley's wife in Of Mice and Men, Perpetua in Venus Observed and Rosaline in Love's Labour's Lost
- Vaudeville, May 1952, Linda Cooper in Sweet Madness
- Embassy, March 1953, Rosina in The Herald Angels
- Strand (for Repertory Players), May 1954, Elizabeth Glossop in Lola
- Q Theatre, September 1954, Aimée in Finishing School
- Bristol Old Vic, February 1956, Goneril in King Lear
- Arts, April 1959, Sedra in Dark Halo
- Connaught (Worthing), October 1960, Joanne in The Warm Peninsula
- Theatre Royal, Bristol, May 1963, Honor Klein in A Severed Head, transferring to the Criterion, London, July 1963, in the same production
- Royale, October 1964, first appearance in New York, Honor Klein in A Severed Head
- Yvonne Arnaud, Guildford, February 1968, Shatov in Call Me Jackie
- Royal Shakespeare Company, Stratford, 1970 season, Margaret in Richard III, Constance in King John and Lucetta in The Two Gentlemen of Verona
- RSC Aldwych, December 1970, Lucetta in The Two Gentlemen of Verona
- Watford Palace, May 1971, Nora Colerne in The Superannuated Man
- Royal Court, August 1971, Mrs James in West of Suez, transferring to the Cambridge Theatre
- National Theatre at the Old Vic, March 1972, Duchess of Gloucester in Richard II; then May 1972, Lady Sneerwell in The School for Scandal, November 1972, First Witch in Macbeth
- Actors' Company, August 1974, Agave in The Bacchae, Madame Pernelle in Tartuffe and Madame Giry in The Phantom of the Opera
- Actors' Company, June 1975, Monica in The Last Romantic
- Round House, August 1978, Dame Purecraft in Bartholomew Fair
- Soho Poly, April 1979, Evelyn in Personal Effects
- Theatre Upstairs, August 1982, Enid in Salonika
- Lyric Studio, June 1983, Exit the King
- Duke of York's, April 1984, Mrs Amos Evans in Strange Interlude
- Old Vic, January 1985, Great Expectations
- Soho Poly, May 1986, Fail/Safe
- Gate, April 1987, Dog Lady/The Cuban Swimmer
- Mermaid (Shared Experience), February 1988, Nana
- Old Vic, April 1990, Marya
- Orange Tree, October 1991, Little Eyolf
- NT Lyttelton, May 1995, Absolute Hell
- Orange Tree, February 1997, Inheritors
- New Ambassadors', July 1999, Last Dance at Dum Dum
- NT Cottesloe, May 2001, Finding the Sun
- Riverside, February 2002, Phaedra
- Royal Court, November 2002, The Lying Kind
- Orange Tree, March 2003, The House of Bernarda Alba

She listed her favourite stage roles as Barbara in Dark of the Moon, Honor Klein in A Severed Head and Queen Margaret in Richard III.

== Selected filmography ==
- The Man in Black (1949) – Janice
- The Rossiter Case (1951) – Honor
- Cloudburst (1951) – Lorna Dawson
- Black Orchid (1953) – Annette
- Women Without Men (A.K.A. Blonde Bait)– (1956)
- The Dawn Killer (1959) – Mrs. Hoddy
- Paranoiac (1963) – Aunt Harriet
- Hell Is Empty (1967) – Judge
- The Desperados (1969) – Emily Galt
- Laughter in the Dark (1969) – Miss Porly
- Six Wives of Henry VIII, TV series (1970) - Lady Rochford
- American Roulette (1988) – Raul's Neighbour
- Afraid of the Dark (1991) – Meg
- Cold Comfort Farm (1995) – Ada Doom
- Jane Eyre (1996) – Lady Eshton
- The Woodlanders (1997) – Grandma Oliver
- Heartbeat (1998) – Mrs Hutton
- William and Mary (2003) – S1E2 - Viney Thomas
- Heartbeat (2004) – Nellie Pratt
- Emmerdale (2005, 2007) – Phyllis King
