= The Hitchhiker's Guide to the Galaxy (novel) =

1979 book by Douglas Adams

- Cover of the original UK paperback edition of the novel, The Hitchhiker's Guide to the Galaxy by Hipgnosis and Ian Wright. The back cover featured the slogan "DON'T PANIC" in the same colour-video-screen style.
- Author: Douglas Adams
- Language: English
- Series: The Hitchhiker's Guide to the Galaxy
- Genre: Science fiction comedy, satire, absurdist fiction
- Publisher: Pan Books
- Publication date: 12 October 1979 (UK); October 1980 (US)
- Publication place: United Kingdom
- Media type: Print (hardcover and paperback)
- ISBN: 0-330-25864-8
- LC Class: PR6051.D3352
- Followed by: The Restaurant at the End of the Universe

The Hitchhiker's Guide to the Galaxy is a 1979 science fiction comedy novel by English author Douglas Adams, adapted from the first four parts of his radio comedy series of the same name. It centres on the misadventures of Arthur Dent, the only man to survive the destruction of Earth, as he roams the cosmos and learns the truth behind his very existence. The novel's namesake is an in-universe electronic travel guide written in the form of an encyclopaedia, through which the story is framed.

The book was first published in London through Pan Books on 12 October 1979. It sold 250,000 copies in the first three months and is often regarded as a classic of the science fiction genre. It is the first in the "trilogy of six" Hitchhiker's Guide book series, with the second novel, The Restaurant at the End of the Universe, being published in 1980.

== Plot summary ==
The novel opens with an introduction describing the human race as a primitive and deeply unhappy species, while also introducing an electronic encyclopedia called the Hitchhiker's Guide to the Galaxy which provides information on every planet in the galaxy.

Earthman and Englishman Arthur Dent awakens in his home in the West Country to discover that the local planning council is trying to demolish his house to build a bypass, and lies down in front of the bulldozer to stop it. His friend Ford Prefect convinces the lead bureaucrat to lie down in Arthur's stead so that he can take Arthur to the local pub. The construction crew begin demolishing the house anyway, but are interrupted by the sudden arrival of a fleet of spaceships. The Vogons, the callous race of civil servants running the fleet, announce that they have come to demolish Earth to make way for a hyperspace expressway, and promptly destroy the planet. Ford and Arthur survive by hitching a ride on the spaceship, much to Arthur's amazement. Ford reveals to Arthur he is an alien researcher for the Hitchhiker's Guide to the Galaxy, from a small planet in the vicinity of Betelgeuse who has been posing as an out-of-work actor from Guildford for 15 years, and this was why they were able to hitch a ride on the alien ship. They are quickly discovered by the Vogons, who torture them by forcing them to listen to their poetry and then toss them out of an airlock.

Meanwhile, Zaphod Beeblebrox, Ford's "semi-cousin" and the President of the Galaxy, steals the spaceship Heart of Gold at its unveiling with his human companion, Trillian. The Heart of Gold is equipped with an "Infinite Improbability Drive" that allows it to travel instantaneously to any point in space by simultaneously passing through every point in the universe at once. However, the Infinite Improbability Drive has a side effect of causing impossible coincidences to occur in the physical universe. One of these improbable events occurs when Arthur and Ford are rescued by the Heart of Gold as it travels using the Infinite Improbability Drive.

Zaphod takes his passengers—Arthur, Ford, a depressed robot named Marvin, and Trillian—to a legendary planet named Magrathea. Its inhabitants were said to have specialized in custom-building planets for others and to have vanished after becoming so rich that the rest of the galaxy became poor. Although Ford initially doubts that the planet is Magrathea, the planet's computers send them warning messages to leave before firing two nuclear missiles at the Heart of Gold. Arthur inadvertently saves them by activating the Infinite Improbability Drive improperly, which also opens an underground passage. As the ship lands, Trillian's pet mice Frankie and Benjy escape.

On Magrathea, Zaphod, Ford, and Trillian venture down to the planet's interior while leaving Arthur and Marvin outside. In the tunnels, Zaphod reveals that his actions are not a result of his own decisions, but instead motivated by neural programming that he was seemingly involved in but has no memory of. As Zaphod explains how he discovered this, the trio are trapped and knocked out with sleeping gas. On the surface, Arthur is met by a resident of Magrathea, a man named Slartibartfast, who explains that the Magratheans have been in stasis to wait out an economic recession. They have temporarily reawakened to reconstruct a second version of Earth commissioned by mice, who were in fact the most intelligent species on Earth. Slartibartfast brings Arthur to Magrathea's planet construction facility, and shows Arthur that in the distant past, a race of "hyperintelligent, pan-dimensional beings" created a supercomputer named Deep Thought to determine the answer to the "Ultimate Question to Life, the Universe, and Everything." Deep Thought eventually found the answer to be 42, an answer that made no sense because the Ultimate Question itself was not known. Because determining the Ultimate Question was too difficult even for Deep Thought, an even more advanced supercomputer was constructed for this purpose. This computer was the planet Earth, which was constructed by the Magratheans, and was five minutes away from finishing its task and figuring out the Ultimate Question when the Vogons destroyed it. The hyperintelligent superbeings participated in the program as mice, performing experiments on humans while pretending to be experimented on.

Slartibartfast takes Arthur to see his friends, who are at a feast hosted by Trillian's pet mice. The mice reject as unnecessary the idea of building a new Earth to start the process over, deciding that Arthur's brain likely contains the Ultimate Question. They offer to buy Arthur's brain, leading to a fight when he declines. The group manages to escape when the planet's security system goes off unexpectedly, but immediately run into the culprits: police in pursuit of Zaphod. The police corner Zaphod, Arthur, Ford and Trillian, and the situation seems desperate as they are trapped behind a computer bank that is about to explode from the officers' weapons firing. However, the police officers suddenly die when their life-support systems short-circuit. Suspicious, Ford discovers on the surface that Marvin became bored and explained his view of the universe to the police officers' spaceship, causing it to commit suicide. The five leave Magrathea and decide to go to The Restaurant at the End of the Universe.

== Illustrated edition ==
The Illustrated Hitchhiker's Guide to the Galaxy is a specially designed book made in 1994. It was first printed in the United Kingdom by Weidenfeld & Nicolson and in the United States by Harmony Books (who sold it for $42.00). It is an oversized book, and came in silver-foil "holographic" covers in both the UK and US markets. It features the first appearance of the 42 Puzzle, designed by Adams himself, a photograph of Adams and his literary agent Ed Victor as the two space cops, and many other designs by Kevin Davies, who has participated in many Hitchhiker's related projects since the stage productions in the late 1970s. Davies himself appears as Prosser. This edition is out of print—Adams bought up many remainder copies and sold them, autographed, on his website.

== In other media ==
=== Audiobook adaptations ===
There have been three audiobook recordings of the novel. The first was an abridged edition (ISBN 0-671-62964-6), recorded in the mid-1980s by Stephen Moore, best known for playing the voice of Marvin the Paranoid Android in the radio series, LP adaptations and in the TV series. In 1990, Adams himself recorded an unabridged edition for Dove Audiobooks (ISBN 1-55800-273-1), later re-released by New Millennium Audio (ISBN 1-59007-257-X) in the United States and available from BBC Audiobooks in the United Kingdom. Also by arrangement with Dove, ISIS Publishing Ltd produced a numbered exclusive edition signed by Douglas Adams (ISBN 1-85695-028-X) in 1994. To tie-in with the 2005 film, actor Stephen Fry, the film's voice of the Guide, recorded a second unabridged edition (ISBN 0-7393-2220-6).

=== Television series ===
The popularity of the radio series gave rise to a six-episode television series, directed and produced by Alan J. W. Bell, which first aired on BBC 2 in January and February 1981. It employed many of the actors from the radio series and was based mainly on the radio versions of Fits the First through Sixth. A second series was planned at one point with a storyline, according to Alan Bell and Mark Wing-Davey, that would have come from Adams's abandoned Doctor Who and the Krikkitmen project (instead of simply making a TV version of the second radio series). However, Adams got into disputes with the BBC (accounts differ: problems with budget, scripts and having Alan Bell involved are all offered as causes) and the second series was never made. Elements of Doctor Who and the Krikkitmen were instead used in the third novel, Life, the Universe and Everything.

The main cast was the same as the original radio series, except for David Dixon as Ford Prefect instead of McGivern and Sandra Dickinson as Trillian instead of Sheridan.

=== Film adaptation ===
The Hitchhiker's Guide to the Galaxy was adapted into a science fiction comedy film directed by Garth Jennings and released on 28 April 2005 in the UK, Australia and New Zealand and on the following day in the United States and Canada. It was rolled out to cinemas worldwide during May, June, July, August and September.

== Reception ==
Greg Costikyan reviewed The Hitchhiker's Guide to the Galaxy in Ares Magazine #6 and commented that "The Hitchhiker's Guide is written with superb English wit, far more humorous than any American sitcom." The Pequod rated the book a 9.5 (out of 10.0) and called it "an ingeniously silly sci-fi satire... It may not add up to much but the jokes keep coming fast and furiously and its enormous cultural influence ("Don't Panic," etc.) proves to be well-earned."

C. J. Henderson reviewed The Hitchhiker's Guide to the Galaxy for Pegasus magazine and stated that "It is silly, happy, absurd stuff. It is the wildest funniest, sci fi novel ever. The only disappointing thing about it is that the reader is forced to wait for the next volume to come out to get more of the same."

== Other books ==
The deliberately misnamed Hitchhiker's Guide to the Galaxy "Trilogy" consists of six books (a hexalogy). The word "trilogy" does not appear on the covers of the first three books and was not used until the publication of the fourth novel. The first five books of the series were written by Adams:

- The Hitchhiker's Guide to the Galaxy (1979)
- The Restaurant at the End of the Universe (1980)
- Life, the Universe and Everything (1982)
- So Long, and Thanks for All the Fish (1984)
- Mostly Harmless (1992)

Irish author Eoin Colfer continued the series with the sixth novel And Another Thing... published in October 2009, the 30th anniversary of the first novel's publication.

== Legacy ==
The "Babel fish", a creature used in the novel that feeds on brainwaves and can instantly translate alien languages, inspired the name of Babel Fish, the first free online language translator, which launched in 1997.

Radiohead's song "Paranoid Android" (1997) was named after Marvin's nickname, and the album it appears on, OK Computer, is part of a line spoken by Zaphod to Eddie, the Heart of Gold's computer.

The Trillian instant messaging app (2000–) was named after the character.

Towel Day is celebrated every year on 25 May as a tribute to Douglas Adams by his fans. On this day, fans openly carry a towel with them to demonstrate their appreciation for Adams and the book series. The commemoration was first held 25 May 2001, two weeks after Adams' death on 11 May.

When Elon Musk's Tesla Roadster was launched into space on the maiden flight of the Falcon Heavy rocket in February 2018, it had the words DON'T PANIC on the dashboard display and carried amongst other items a copy of the novel and a towel.

In 2022, the novel was included on the "Big Jubilee Read" list of 70 books by Commonwealth authors, selected to celebrate the Platinum Jubilee of Elizabeth II.

The novel's popularity (or the entire Hitchhikers franchise) has contributed to many homages and references involving the number 42, ranging from numerous mentions in pop culture to frequent mentions of the novel whenever the number 42 is addressed in Western media.

== Awards ==
- Number one on the Sunday Times bestseller list (1979)
- Author received the "Golden Pan" (From his publishers for reaching the 1,000,000th book sold) (1984)
- Waterstone's Books/Channel Four's list of the 'One Hundred Greatest Books of the Century', at number 24. (1996)
- BBC's "Big Read", an attempt to find the "Nation's Best-loved book", ranked it number four. (2003)

== See also ==
- Spelling of Hitchhiker's Guide for variations in the spelling of the title.
- h2g2, a collaborative encyclopedia project started by Douglas Adams before Wikipedia existed
