= Peter Jones (actor) =

English actor (1920–2000)

- Born: Peter Geoffrey Francis Jones; 12 June 1920; Wem, Shropshire, England
- Died: 10 April 2000 (aged 79); Westminster, London, England
- Occupations: Actor, screenwriter, broadcaster
- Years active: 1936–2000
- Spouse: Jeri Sauvinet
- Children: 3, including Bill Dare

Peter Geoffrey Francis Jones (12 June 1920 – 10 April 2000) was an English actor, screenwriter and broadcaster.

== Early life and early career ==
Peter Jones, born in Wem, Shropshire, was educated at Wem Grammar School and Ellesmere College, making his first appearance as an actor in Wolverhampton at the age of 16 and then appeared in repertory theatre in East Anglia. In 1942 he acted on the West End stage in The Doctor's Dilemma and in 1942 he made an uncredited film appearance in Fanny by Gaslight. An early film credit was as a Xenobian trade delegate in Chance of a Lifetime (1950).

He appeared in the 1949 comedy Love in Albania by Eric Linklater. He co-wrote the 1954 play The Party Spirit which ran in the West End with Ralph Lynn and Robertson Hare. His own play Sweet Madness was staged in the West End at the Vaudeville Theatre in 1952.

== Radio ==
Between 1952 and 1955 Jones starred alongside Peter Ustinov in the BBC radio comedy In All Directions. The show featured Jones and Ustinov as themselves in a car in London perpetually searching for Copthorne Avenue. The comedy derived from the characters they met along the way, often also played by themselves. The show was unusual for the time in that it was largely improvised—with the tape subsequently edited for broadcast by Frank Muir and Denis Norden, who also sometimes took part. Two of the more popular characters were Morris and Dudley Grosvenor, two rather stupid East End spivs whose sketches always ended with the phrase "Run for it Dudley" (or Morry as appropriate). Three recordings survive in the BBC Sound Archive. The Grosvenor character was revived for a later radio series We're in Business, co-starring Harry Worth. Another notable radio role was as Mervyn Bunter in the BBC Radio 4 adaptations of Dorothy L. Sayers' Lord Peter Wimsey stories. He was for 29 years a regular contestant on the panel game Just A Minute, becoming much-loved for his dry, acid wit.

He was the voice of The Book in the original first two radio series of Douglas Adams' The Hitchhiker's Guide to the Galaxy. The creators had wanted someone with a "Peter Jonesy sort of voice" and after several rejections asked Jones himself. He reprised the role for the LP and the TV series. Jones narrated Douglas Adams' later radio documentary Last Chance to See in a style similar to the earlier series.

Following his death clips of the actor were used for a third Hitchhiker's Guide to the Galaxy radio show known as the "Tertiary Phase". The clips were electronically distorted and the reason was given that the Book was undergoing an upgrade, which caused its voice to glitch and change (to that of actor William Franklyn, who took over the role for the third to fifth series).

Jones had a role in Patrick Barlow's The Patrick and Maureen Maybe Music Experience.

He wrote and narrated J Kingston Platt's Showbiz Handbook in the 1980s for BBC Radio 4. These comic monologues are the fictional memoirs of an actor and producer working in British theatre and film from the 1940s to the 1980s, partially based on his own career.

Jones starred as the lead character, Julius Hutch, in two series of four episodes of Capital Gains in 1995 and 1997 for BBC Radio 4.

== Television ==
On television, Jones was best known for his lead role as Mr Fenner in the comedy series The Rag Trade (BBC TV 1961–63, LWT 1977–78), but he also had acting roles in the British comedy series Beggar My Neighbour, The Goodies, the courtroom drama Rumpole of the Bailey, Holby City, Whoops Apocalypse, The Bill, Midsomer Murders, Minder and two episodes of The Avengers.

He also starred in the filmed comedy series From a Bird's Eye View (1970), a vehicle for Millicent Martin, in an attempt to break into the American market. He also appeared as Maurice Morris in series 5 (episode 3) of the British comedy series Man About the House (1975).

From 1969 to 1971, Jones starred opposite Sheila Hancock in a sitcom (for ITV, by Yorkshire Television) called Mr Digby Darling, lasting for three series (and 19 episodes). An occasional scriptwriter, Jones co-wrote and starred in the sitcom Mr. Big (1977), with Ian Lavender, Prunella Scales and Carol Hawkins.

He reprised the role of the voice of The Book for The Hitchhiker's Guide to the Galaxy's the LP and the TV series.

He did various other television work, including starring in TV's 1984 ITV sitcom I Thought You'd Gone with Pat Heywood. He also appeared as former Detective Inspector Henry Keys in the 1994 Minder episode The Great Depression of 1994. One of his last broadcasts before his death was narrating the Doctor Who documentary Adventures in Space and Time.

== Film ==
Jones featured in a number of films, including Private's Progress (1956), School for Scoundrels (1960, reprising his Dudley Grosvenor character as a used-car salesman with Dennis Price), Just like a Woman (1967) alongside Wendy Craig, The Return of the Pink Panther (1975) and Chariots of Fire (1981).

== Personal life ==
Jones's wife, Jeri (Jerri) Sauvinet, was an American theatre actress who pre-deceased him in 1999. She played Miss Rufford in Lady Windermere's Fan, the comedy by Oscar Wilde. They had three children together: a daughter, Selena, and two sons, Charles and Bill. Jones died of natural causes aged 79 in 2000 at Westminster, London, after contracting septicaemia following surgery. At the time of his death he was also suffering from lymphatic leukaemia and heart disease.

== Selected filmography ==
- Fanny by Gaslight (1944) – Young Client At 'The Shades' (uncredited)
- Dead of Night (1945) – Fred – Barman (segment "Golfing Story") (uncredited)
- I See a Dark Stranger (1946) – Soldier in Pub (uncredited)
- Vice Versa (1948) – Chawner
- Forbidden (1949) – Pete
- Private Angelo (1949) – (uncredited)
- Chance of a Lifetime (1950) – Xenobian
- Last Holiday – Travel Agent (uncredited)
- Cairo Road (1950) – Ship's Lieutenant
- The Franchise Affair (1951) – Bernard Chadwick
- The Browning Version (1951) – Carstairs
- Home to Danger (1951) – Lips Leonard
- High Treason (1951) – Announcer at Music Club (uncredited)
- The Magic Box (1951) – Industry Man
- Angels One Five (1952) – Sentry
- Time Gentlemen, Please! (1952) – Lionel Batts
- 24 Hours of a Woman's Life (1952) – Bill
- Miss Robin Hood (1952) – Cyril Lidstone
- The Long Memory (1952) – Fisher
- The Yellow Balloon (1953) – Spiv
- Innocents in Paris (1953) – Langton
- The Good Beginning (1953) – Furrier
- A Day to Remember (1953) – Percy Goodall
- Albert R.N. (1953) – Schoolie
- For Better, for Worse (1954) – Car Salesman
- John and Julie (1955) – Jeremy
- On Such a Night (1955) – 2nd gentleman
- Private's Progress (1956) – Arthur Egan
- Charley Moon (1956) – Stewart
- Blue Murder at St Trinian's (1957) – Prestwick
- Danger Within (1959) – Capt. Alfred Piker
- Operation Bullshine (1959) – Gunner Perkins
- School for Scoundrels (1960) – Dudley
- Never Let Go (1960) – Alec Berger
- The Bulldog Breed (1960) – Diving Instructor
- Nearly a Nasty Accident (1961) – Flight Lt. Winters
- Romanoff and Juliet (1961) – Otto
- A Stitch in Time (1963) – Capt. Russell, St. John's Ambulance Brigade
- Father Came Too! (1964) – Charles II
- The Sandwich Man (1966) – Manfred the Magnificent – Escapologist
- Press for Time (1966) – Robin Willobey (photographer)
- Just like a Woman (1967) – Saul Alexander
- Smashing Time (1967) – Dominic
- Carry On Doctor (1967) – Chaplain
- Hot Millions (1968) – Prison Governor (uncredited)
- The Return of the Pink Panther (1975) – Psychiatrist
- Confessions of a Pop Performer (1975) – Maxy Naus
- Seven Nights in Japan (1976) – Capt. Balcon
- Carry On England (1976) – Brigadier
- Chariots of Fire (1981) – Leonard Mullen
- The Agatha Christie Hour (1982) – George Packington
