= Sweet Madness (play) =

1952 play

- Original language: English
- Written by: Peter Jones
- Genre: Comedy
- Setting: A flat in St James's

Premiere
- Date: 11 March 1952
- Place: Q Theatre, London

Sweet Madness is a 1952 comedy play written by the British actor Peter Jones. It premiered at the Q Theatre in Kew Bridge before transferring to the Vaudeville Theatre in the West End where it ran for 125 performances between 21 May and 6 September 1952. The cast featured Richard Attenborough, Laurence Naismith, Robin Bailey, Martin Miller, Sheila Burrell and Geraldine McEwan. It was originally known as The Song of the Centipede before being renamed for its West End transfer.

== Bibliography ==
- Street, Sean. The A to Z of British Radio. Scarecrow Press, 2009.
- Wearing, J.P. The London Stage 1950–1959: A Calendar of Productions, Performers, and Personnel. Rowman & Littlefield, 2014.
