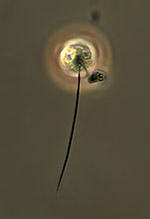
- Kiitoksia kaloista, phase contrast light micrograph of living cell, from Lake Crowley, Eastern Sierras (California); debris attached to short flagellum.

Scientific classification
- Domain: Eukaryota
- Clade: Sar
- Clade: Rhizaria
- Phylum: Cercozoa
- Class: Metromonadea
- Order: Metromonadida
- Family: Kiitoksiidae; Cavalier-Smith in Cavalier-Smith & Scoble, 2013
- Genus: Kiitoksia; N.Vørs, 1992

Type species
- Kiitoksia ystava Vørs 1992

Species
- Kiitoksia kaloista; Kiitoksia parva (Schouteden) Cavalier-Smith; Kiitoksia ystava Vørs 1992

= Kiitoksia =

Genus of aquatic organisms

Kiitoksia is a genus of aquatic protist. The taxonomic position of the genus is still uncertain and it has not found a robust location in any subgroup.

Two species are confidently known in the genus: Kiitoksia ystava and Kiitoksia kaloista. K. ystava was first discovered in Tvärminne in the Gulf of Finland. K. kaloista was discovered in Sombre Lake on Signy Island, near Antarctica. A third species, K. parva was transferred from the genus Clautriavia by Smith and Scoble

The Kiitoksia species are single-celled organisms approximately 2-4 micrometres in size and round in shape. The species can be distinguished by their flagella: K. ystava has two flagella, one short and one long, while K. kaloista has one long flagellum.

== Name ==
"Kiitoksia" is a Finnish word for "thanks". The phrase "kiitoksia, ystävä" means "thank you, friend", while "kiitoksia kaloista" means "thanks for the fish". The latter name is a reference to the Douglas Adams novel, So Long, and Thanks for All the Fish.
