= H2g2 =

British-based collaborative online encyclopaedia project

h2g2
- The h2g2 front page on 24 May 2015
- Website type: Internet encyclopaedia project
- Available in: English
- Owner: Not Panicking Ltd
- Creator: Douglas Adams
- Website: h2g2.com
- Registration: open
- Launched: 28 April 1999; 27 years ago
- Current status: Active
- Content license: Authors retain copyright but grant NPL a non-exclusive licence to distribute

The h2g2 (Note: h2g2 is an initialism for The Hitchhiker's Guide to the Galaxy.) website is a British-based collaborative online encyclopaedia project. It describes itself as "an unconventional guide to life, the universe, and everything", in the spirit of the fictional publication The Hitchhiker's Guide to the Galaxy from the science fiction comedy series of the same name by Douglas Adams. It was founded by Adams in 1999 and was run by the BBC between 2001 and 2011.

The intent is to create an Earth-focused guide that allows members to share information about their geographic area and the local sites, activities and businesses, to help people decide where they want to go and what they may find when they get there. It has grown to contain subjects from restaurants and recipes, to quantum theory and history. Explicit advertising of businesses was forbidden when the site was run by the BBC, but customer reviews were permitted.

The content of the project is written by registered "Researchers" on its website. Articles written by Researchers form the "Guide" as a whole, with an "Edited Guide" being steadily created out of factual articles that have been peer reviewed via the "Peer Review" system. The Edited Guide includes both traditional encyclopaedic subjects and more idiosyncratic offerings, and articles in the Edited Guide sometimes aim for a slightly humorous style.

== History ==
The Digital Village (TDV) was a digital media company based in Covent Garden, London, United Kingdom. It was founded in 1992. The science fiction/comedy writer Douglas Adams was one of the founding members, along with Robbie Stamp, executive producer of the Hitchhiker's Guide to the Galaxy movie (2005). TDV produced the video game Starship Titanic. The h2g2 website was founded on 28 April 1999 as a community-site dedicated to producing the "Earth edition" of The Hitchhiker's Guide to the Galaxy by the author of the series, Douglas Adams, and his friends and colleagues at The Digital Village.

Digital Village was renamed in 2000 to "h2g2", an abbreviation for the title as well as part of the url. The site was a runner-up for Best Community Site in the Yell.com awards in 2000. At its highest point (October 2000) the company had over 40 employees. Like other dot-com companies, Adams' company ran into financial difficulties towards the end of 2000 and eventually ceased operations. In January 2001, the management of the site was taken over by the BBC, and moved to bbc.co.uk (then known as BBCi). While many h2g2 staff continued to work without pay until the h2g2 site, brand and several staff moved to the BBC. The game division became a new company, Phase 3 Studios, which continued for several months under the ownership of PAN Interactive, but ultimately closed in 2002.

21 April 2005 marked the re-launch of h2g2 Mobile, an edition of the guide produced for PDAs (Personal Digital Assistants) and mobile phones that could access the internet, so that people could read h2g2 entries while on the move. This was done because people wanted h2g2 to be much like the Hitchhiker's Guide described in the books – a mobile, electronic device that anyone could read from anywhere. An earlier incarnation of h2g2 Mobile was a WAP phone based version of h2g2. Announced at First Tuesday in London on 14 December 1999, it became the most trafficked WAP site in Europe until it was closed down by the BBC when it took over the site in January 2001. h2g2 Mobile was closed by the BBC as it then believed that its licence conditions did not allow it to deliver any service over a telephone system.

The site was redesigned for the BBC by Aerian Studios in 2011, bringing it in line with the general appearance of other BBC websites, while maintaining a degree of the site's old character.

On 24 January 2011, the BBC announced cuts of 25% to its online budget, resulting in a £34 million less investment into the site. A number of sites were to be closed, including BBC Switch, BBC Blast and 6-0-6. As part of this exercise, the BBC chose to sell h2g2. On 21 June 2011, it was announced the winning bid was a joint bid put together by three parties: Robbie Stamp, h2g2c2 ("The h2g2 Community Consortium"), and the owners of Lycos Chat (Brian Larholm and Alyson Larholm). On 31 August 2011, it was announced h2g2 was sold to Not Panicking Ltd, a company founded by Robbie Stamp, Brian Larholm, and Alyson Larholm, as well as The h2g2 Community Consortium.

On 3 October 2011, the BBC incarnation of h2g2 closed, leaving only an announcement reading "H2G2 has now left the BBC. The new owners of H2G2 are currently preparing the site for relaunch. Soon you will find The Guide to Life, the Universe and Everything at www.h2g2.com". The post-BBC version of the site went live on 16 October 2011.

== Terms and conditions ==
To contribute to the site it is necessary to register and to agree to the h2g2 "House Rules" and the general Not Panicking Ltd Terms and Conditions. Registered users are called Researchers. Researchers retain the copyright to their articles, but grant Not Panicking Ltd a non-exclusive licence to reproduce their work in all formats.

== Software ==
=== DNA ===
Part of the software for h2g2 is known as DNA, after the initials of author and site founder Douglas Adams. The DNA technology was introduced a few months after the BBC takeover and is still used for BBC blogs, messageboards and commenting systems. Before that there was a technology which was written mostly in Perl. Adams was involved in the website in its early days. His account name was DNA, and his user number was 42, a reference to the joke in The Hitchhiker's Guide to the Galaxy that the Answer to the Ultimate Question of Life, the Universe and Everything is 42. Adams's legacy is still felt on h2g2, though it is not a fan site.

=== GuideML ===
GuideML (Guide Markup Language) is a document markup language.

GuideML is an application of XML standards. It consists of a safe subset of XHTML with added tags for specific features of the software. The objective is to provide something that resembles HTML but is simpler to learn, and allows basic textual content to be formatted in a skinnable way. Early versions of the h2g2 software offered full HTML markup as an option, but this was removed for security reasons; thus only parts of HTML which are considered to exist in GuideML can now be used, with things such as JavaScript and externally hosted images being removed by the parser.

== See also ==
- List of online encyclopedias
