= The Originist =

Short story by Orson Scott Card

- Short story by Orson Scott Card
- Country: United States
- Language: English

Publication
- Published in: Foundation's Friends
- Publisher: Tor Books
- Media type: Print (hardcover & paperback)
- Publication date: 1989
- Series: Foundation series

Short story collection

"The Originist" is a short story by Orson Scott Card. First published in the short story collection Foundation's Friends (1989), it also appears in his short story collection Maps in a Mirror. This story is set in Isaac Asimov's Foundation universe. It was voted 8th in the category Best Novella at the 1990 Locus Awards.

== Plot summary ==
The events in "The Originist" take place just after the first part of Foundation and deal with Hari Seldon's establishment of the Second Foundation.

== Reception ==
David Langford who commented briefly on the anthology Foundation's Friends, praised Orson Scott Card's work as the best story in the anthology and "the best Foundation/Empire story ever written". Similar sentiment was expressed by the reviewer for asimovreviews.net.

== See also ==
- List of works by Orson Scott Card
