= Tim Souster =

British composer and writer (1943–1994)

Background information
- Born: 29 January 1943; Bletchley, Buckinghamshire
- Died: 1 March 1994 (aged 51)
- Occupation: Composer

Tim Souster (29 January 1943 – 1 March 1994) was a British composer and writer on music, best known for his electronic music output.

== Biography ==
=== Education ===
Born Timothy Andrew James Souster in Bletchley, Buckinghamshire, Souster was educated at Bedford Modern School (from 1952 through 1961) and New College, Oxford (from 1961 through 1964). His teachers included Bernard Rose, Sir David Lumsden and Egon Wellesz. In 1964, he attended summer courses at Darmstadt taught by Karlheinz Stockhausen, and took composition lessons with Richard Rodney Bennett the following year.

Before the end of 1965, Souster was a producer with the BBC Third Programme, and put on many performances of contemporary music by composers such as Boulez, Berio, Barraqué, Cardew, Feldman, Henze and Stockhausen. After leaving the BBC in 1967, he began to devote more time to composing and songwriting.

=== Foray into electronic music ===
In the late 1960s, Souster began experimenting with electronics. His first acknowledged composition involving electronic techniques was Titus Groan Music (1969) for wind quintet, ring modulator, amplifiers and tape. In August of the same year he moved to King's College, Cambridge and formed a live-electronic group with Roger Smalley, Andrew Powell and Robin Thompson called Intermodulation. As well as compositions by Souster and Smalley, the group performed contemporary music by Cardew, Riley, Rzewski, Stockhausen and Wolff.

=== Later years ===
In 1971, Souster became a teaching assistant to Stockhausen in Cologne, and in 1973 he moved to Berlin where he remained for two years. In 1975, Souster returned to England to take up a research fellowship at Keele University. He remained in England for the rest of his life, except for a six-month stint in California in 1978.

He died after a brief, sudden illness on 1 March 1994.

== Compositions ==
His concert pieces included Triple Music II for three orchestras, given at the Proms in 1970 and revised in 1974, Song of an Average City for small orchestra and tape, conducted by Pierre Boulez at the Roundhouse in 1974, and a Trumpet Concerto (1988) for John Wallace and the BBC National Orchestra of Wales.

In the 1980s and 1990s, Souster wrote music for film and television, including music for The Hitchhikers Guide to the Galaxy, for which he also arranged the main theme, a version of "Journey of the Sorcerer" by The Eagles. His music for the BBC drama miniseries The Green Man, adapted from the Kingsley Amis novel and starring Albert Finney, won the BAFTA award for best TV music of 1990. He also composed the music for the 1988 film Slugs, the 1989 Channel 4 series Traffik, and contributed music to the Australian TV series Prisoner Cell Block H.

During this period, Souster composed a large amount of concert music. He wrote a number of important works for brass and electronics including Equalisation (1980) for Equale Brass and Echoes (1990). His last completed work was La marche (1993), a brass quintet.

== Cited sources ==
- Anon. 2005. "Spectral (1972): Tim Souster". Cut and Splice 2005, BBC Radio 3 (accessed 8 February 2016).
- Griffiths, Paul. 2001. "Souster, Tim". The New Grove Dictionary of Music and Musicians, second edition, edited by Stanley Sadie and John Tyrrell. London: Macmillan Publishers.
- Jack, Adrian. 1994. Obituary: Tim Souster. The Independent (7 March).
