= Journey of the Sorcerer =

Instrumental by the Eagles

Instrumental by Eagles

from the album One of These Nights
- Released: June 10, 1975
- Recorded: 1974–1975
- Genre: Progressive rock; soft rock; bluegrass; psychedelia
- Length: 6:40
- Label: Asylum
- Composer: Bernie Leadon
- Producer: Bill Szymczyk

"Journey of the Sorcerer" is an instrumental by the American rock band Eagles. It appeared on their 1975 album One of These Nights and was later used as the theme tune to the BBC comedy/science fiction franchise The Hitchhiker's Guide to the Galaxy. In this latter role, it has been re-recorded several times.

== Composition ==
The song was written by group member Bernie Leadon, and based around the banjo. For One of These Nights, the Eagles recorded it as a six-minute instrumental piece featuring an orchestra, with brief fiddle solos. The rest of the group, particularly co-founders Don Henley and Glenn Frey, were not keen on it being included on the album, which contributed to the friction in the band and Leadon quitting. It was later described by Rolling Stone as "bluegrass psychedelia".

== Reception ==
Rolling Stone critic Stephen Holden called it "a bombastic instrumental [that] should have been omitted" from the album.

== Hitchhiker's Guide to the Galaxy ==
The Eagles' version of "Journey of the Sorcerer" was used as the theme tune to the original BBC Radio 4 Hitchhiker's Guide to the Galaxy radio series in 1978. Creator Douglas Adams was looking for a particular piece of music that would distinctively represent the series, that sounded "spacey" but not serious, such as a banjo. He looked through his collection of LPs, which included One of These Nights, and decided it was ideal, representing a feeling of alienation.

Tim Souster recorded a new version of the piece for the LP release of the first radio series. Later adaptations featured a recording of the theme by Doctor Who composer Paddy Kingsland. For the 2005 film, a new version was recorded by Joby Talbot. It was used again for the continuation of the radio series in 2018.
