= So Long, and Thanks for All the Fish =

1984 book by Douglas Adams

- First Edition (UK) with lenticular print of a plesiosaurus and walrus
- Author: Douglas Adams
- Cover artist: Gary Day-Ellison
- Language: English
- Series: The Hitchhiker's Guide to the Galaxy
- Genre: Comic Science Fiction
- Publisher: Pan Books, UK; Harmony Books, US
- Publication date: 9 November 1984
- Publication place: United Kingdom
- Media type: Print (Hardcover and Paperback)
- Pages: 192, UK paperback; 224, US paperback
- ISBN: 0-330-28700-1
- OCLC: 48363310
- Preceded by: Life, the Universe and Everything
- Followed by: Mostly Harmless

So Long, and Thanks for All the Fish is the fourth book of the Hitchhiker's Guide to the Galaxy "trilogy of six books" written by Douglas Adams. Its title is the message left by the dolphins when they departed Planet Earth just before it was demolished to make way for a hyperspace bypass, as described in The Hitchhiker's Guide to the Galaxy. A song of the same name was featured in the 2005 film adaptation of The Hitchhiker's Guide to the Galaxy.

== Plot summary ==
While hitchhiking through the galaxy, Arthur Dent is dropped off on a planet in a rainstorm. He appears to be in England on Earth, even though he had seen the planet destroyed by the Vogons. He has been gone for several years, but only a few months have passed on Earth. He hitches a lift with a man named Russell and his sister Fenchurch (nicknamed "Fenny"). Russell explains that Fenny, who is sitting in a drugged state in the back seat of the car, became delusional after worldwide mass hysteria, in which everyone hallucinated "big yellow spaceships" (the Vogon destructor ships that "demolished" the Earth). Arthur becomes curious about Fenchurch, but he is dropped off before he can ask more questions. Inside his inexplicably undamaged home, Arthur finds a gift-wrapped bowl inscribed with the words "So long and thanks for all the fish", into which he puts his Babel Fish. Arthur thinks that Fenchurch is somehow connected to him and to the Earth's destruction. He still has the ability to fly whenever he lets his thoughts wander.

Arthur puts his life in order, and then tries to find out more about Fenchurch. He happens to find her hitchhiking and picks her up. He obtains her phone number, but shortly thereafter loses it. He discovers her home by accident when he searches for the cave in which he had lived on prehistoric Earth; Fenchurch's flat is built on the same spot. Arthur and Fenchurch find more circumstances connecting them. Fenchurch reveals that, moments before her "hallucinations", she had an epiphany about how to make everything right, but then blacked out. She has not been able to recall the substance of the epiphany. Eventually discovering that Fenchurch's feet do not touch the ground, Arthur teaches her how to fly. They have sex in the skies over London.

In her conversation with Arthur, Fenchurch learns about his adventures hitchhiking across the galaxy, and Arthur learns that all the dolphins disappeared shortly after the world hallucinations. Arthur and Fenchurch travel to California to see John Watson, an enigmatic scientist who claims to know why the dolphins disappeared. Watson has abandoned his original name in favour of "Wonko the Sane", because he believes that the rest of the world's population has gone mad. Watson shows them another bowl with the words "So long and thanks for all the fish" inscribed on it, and encourages them to listen to it. The bowl explains audibly that the dolphins, aware of the planet's coming destruction, left Earth for an alternate dimension. Before leaving, they pulled the Earth from a parallel universe into this one and transported everyone and everything onto it from the one about to be destroyed. After the meeting, Fenchurch tells Arthur that, while he lost something and later found it, she found something and later lost it. She desires that they travel to space together, and that they reach the site where God's Final Message to His Creation is written.

Ford Prefect discovers that the Hitchhiker's Guide entry for Earth has been updated to include the volumes of text that he originally wrote, instead of the previous truncated entry, "Mostly harmless". Curious, Ford hitchhikes across the galaxy to reach Earth. Eventually he uses the ship of a giant robot to land in the centre of London, causing a panic. In the chaos, Ford reunites with Arthur and the two of them and Fenchurch commandeer the robot's ship. Arthur takes Fenchurch to the planet where God's Final Message to His Creation is written, where they discover Marvin. Due to previous events, Marvin is now approximately 37 times older than the known age of the universe and is barely functional. With Arthur's and Fenchurch's help, Marvin reads the Message ("We apologise for the inconvenience"), utters the final words "I think... I feel good about it", and dies happily.

== Style and themes ==
The novel has a very different tone from the previous books in the series. It is a romance, and also moves around in time more erratically than its predecessors. It is set largely on Earth; Arthur only returns to outer space in the final chapters. The different tone also reflects the rushed nature of the writing; Adams's editor Sonny Mehta moved in with him to ensure that the book met its deadline, which had been repeatedly extended. As a result, Adams later stated that he was not entirely happy with the book, which includes several jarring authorial intrusions, which his biographer Neil Gaiman described as "patronising and unfair".

The book also reflects a significant shift in Adams's view of computers. In the previous books, computers had been portrayed quite negatively, reflecting Adams's views on the subject at the time. However, between the writing of Life, the Universe and Everything and So Long, and Thanks for All the Fish, his attitude toward technology changed considerably. Having been taken to a computer fair, he became enamored of the first model of the Macintosh, the start of a long love affair with the brand (he claimed to have bought two of the first three Macs in the UK, the other being bought by his friend Stephen Fry). In So Long, and Thanks for All the Fish, Arthur Dent purchases an Apple computer for the purpose of star mapping in order to pinpoint the location of the cave he lived in on prehistoric Earth, and although Adams mocks Arthur's methodology (noting that he really has no idea of how to go about such a task), the computer itself is not disparaged, and produces the correct result despite Arthur's haphazard approach. In a later essay, Adams noted that some people had accused him of being a "turncoat" because of this change in his attitudes.

== Literary significance and reception ==
In 1993, Library Journal said that So Long, and Thanks for all the Fish was "filled with loopy humor and pretzel logic that makes Adams' writing so delightful". Betsy Shorb, reviewing for School Library Journal, said that "the humor is still off-the-wall but more gentle than the other books. The plot is more straight forward and slightly less bizarre than its predecessors". Dave Langford reviewed So Long, and Thanks for All the Fish for White Dwarf #62, and stated that "Sequelholism has drained Adams of his high-speed inventiveness which made him famous. No doubt he'll agree with me all the way to the bank".

== Audiobook adaptations ==
There have been three audiobook recordings of the novel. The first was an abridged edition, recorded in the mid-1980s by Stephen Moore, best known for playing the voice of Marvin the Paranoid Android in the radio series, LP adaptations and in the TV series. In 1990, Adams himself recorded an unabridged edition, later re-released by New Millennium Audio in the United States and available from BBC Audiobooks in the United Kingdom. In 2006, actor Martin Freeman, who had played Arthur Dent in the 2005 movie, recorded a new unabridged edition of the audiobook.

The Quandary Phase of the radio series is drawn from So Long and Thanks for All the Fish, but is not a direct audiobook reading.

== Dedication ==
The dedication thanks, among others, "Mogens and Andy and all at Huntsham Court for a number of unstable events". This refers to the then country hotel in Devon where Adams retreated in the summer of 1984 to work on the book but instead enjoyed drinking wine with the owners and Steve Meretzky who had joined him to work on the Hitchhiker's video game.

== See also ==
- Kiitoksia kaloista, a species of protozoa named after the book.
- "So Long, And Thanks For All The Fish", a song by A Perfect Circle on their album Eat the Elephant
