= Duff House, St John's Wood =

Coordinates: 51.536772°N 0.1711953°W

Duff House, St John's Wood is a name dating from the 1910s of a former private house at 43a Acacia Road, St John's Wood, in north-west London. Originally used as a private school running at least from the 1860s to about 1900, it was the site of a YWCA hall during World War I. The hall itself became a noted theatrical venue as the first Mermaid Theatre run by Bernard Miles, when he owned the house.

== St John's Wood Proprietary School ==
Edward Ditcher Ward (1824–1912) was Principal of St John's Wood Proprietary School from 1861 to 1873, address in 1868 in Acacia Road. He then was vicar of Overchurch from 1873 to 1909.

== The Olivers' school ==
Henry Alfred Green Oliver (1844–1880) took over in 1873 the St John's Wood School in Acacia Road (no connection with the St John's Wood School of Art). He was educated at Tonbridge School, and was a graduate of Jesus College, Cambridge ordained a priest of the Church of England in 1871. The house number was given in 1884 (so after his death) as 44. He was succeeded as headmaster in 1880 by his elder brother George William Oliver (1836–1922), educated at Tonbridge School and a graduate of Christ's College, Cambridge, ordained priest in 1861. He retired in 1901, becoming the following year a curate at St Anselm's, Streatham, from 1882 a chapel of ease of St Leonard's Church, Streatham. Andrew Stoddart was a pupil at the school, from about 1874, and Kennerley Rumford was an alumnus.

Around 1890 Hubert William Ord, working his way to a London University degree, came to teach at the school through an agency, the only assistant master under Oliver and Sidney Jones. In his memoirs he mentioned that the astronomer Henry Park Hollis had taught there. The number of pupils was around 50, half of the peak value. Sons of the artists Onslow Ford and Briton Rivière were there.

In March 1900 the Sesame House for Home-Life Training, Principal Miss Schepel, was being advertised at 43a Acacia Road.

== Lilian Duff ==
Lilian (Selina) Amy Duff (1862–1910) was an associate of Emily Kinnaird and superintendent of Finsbury House in London of the Young Women's Christian Association (YWCA). She was a younger daughter of James Duff the Member of Parliament for North Norfolk, and younger sister of Mildred Duff of the Salvation Army. She was called by the Norfolk Chronicle in 1911 "an earnest and devoted Y.W.C.A. worker". It reported that a new YWCA recreation hall in Norwich was being "happily associated" with her name.

In 1917 there was a Duff House YMCA Training Centre at 43A Acacia Road, St John's Wood. The YMCA formally opened Duff House as a National Training Centre in 1918. In 1920 there was a headquarters for Girl Guides in north-west London in Duff House Hall, at 43A Acacia Road. In 1923 a Montessori School class was advertised in Duff Hall, 43a Acacia Road.

== Hilda Dederich ==
The pianist Hilda Dederich (married name Mrs. Hilda Lindars) gave her address as Duff House, 43a Acacia Road during the 1930s.

== Miles family ==
The acting couple Bernard Miles and Josephine Wilson bought Duff House at 43a Acacia Road in 1945. They learned of the history of the house as a school from a visit by a son of Henry Alfred Green Oliver. The hall at the back of the house was then in a poor condition. In the late 1940s Miles built in wood a replica of Shakespeare's Globe in the hall.

The conversion of the old school assembly hall into the first Mermaid Theatre was carried out in 1951 by Ernst Freud. He worked with Michael Stringer and C. Walter Hodges. Hodges wrote that the stage "was intended as a free experiment in the Elizabethan style." It worked for Elizabethan drama and Restoration opera. It was in use "for two seasons." While the stage was used, Freud's full conversion of the hall remained unbuilt. The management committee of the theatre was set up around Peter Daubeny, who brought in Ivor Novello, the actor Derek Glynne, and George Bowthorpe.

In the 1951 production of Dido and Aeneas, the baritone Thomas Hemsley made his debut in a major role, with Kirsten Flagstad as Dido. Maggie Teyte sang the part of Belinda, and Arda Mandikian the First Witch. Edith Coates was the Sorceress, and Murray Dickie the Attendant Spirit. The conductor was Geraint Iwan Jones.

Leslie Boyce, then Lord Mayor of London, saw Macbeth performed at the theatre in 1952. At his suggestion, the stage was used the following year, to celebrate the Coronation of Elizabeth II. It was rebuilt outside in the quadrangle at the Royal Exchange, London for a 13-week season. In May 1953 As You Like It was given. This venue was used until 1959, when Miles used a site on Puddle Dock for the permanent home of the Mermaid Theatre. In terms of theatre history and historically informed performance, the Mermaid's thrust stage was a first for London commercial playhouses.

Wilson died in 1990, and Miles in 1991. Within a few years, Duff House itself was demolished for redevelopment work.

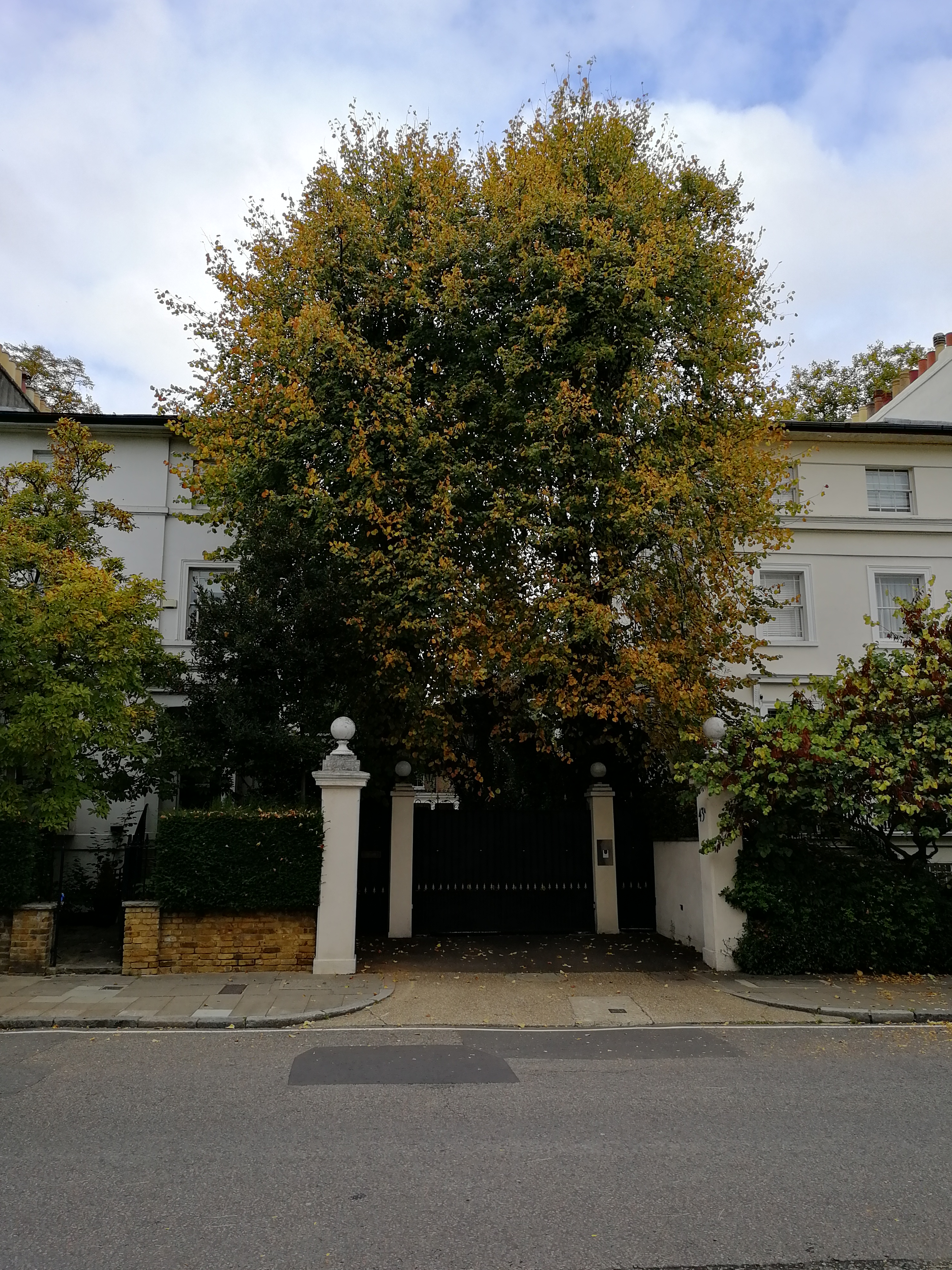
Street entrance view of Mermaid House, 43a Acacia Road, 2025 photograph
