= Rachel Gurney =

English actress (1920–2001)

- Born: 5 March 1920; Buckinghamshire, England
- Died: 24 November 2001 (aged 81); Norfolk, England
- Education: Dr Challoner's High School, Webber Douglas Academy of Dramatic Art
- Occupation: Actress
- Years active: 1949–1995
- Employer: ITV
- Television: Upstairs, Downstairs
- Spouse: Denys Rhodes (m. 1946; div. 1950)
- Children: 1
- Parents: Samuel Gurney Lubbock (father); Irene Scharrer (mother)

Rachel Gurney (5 March 1920 – 24 November 2001) was an English actress. She began her career in the theatre towards the end of World War II and then expanded into television and film in the 1950s. She remained active, mostly in television and theatre work, into the early 1990s. She is best remembered for playing the elegant Lady Marjorie Bellamy in the ITV period drama Upstairs, Downstairs.

== Biography ==
=== Early life and education ===
Rachel Gurney was born in Buckinghamshire, England on 5 March 1920. Her father, Samuel Gurney Lubbock, was a housemaster at Eton and her mother, Irene Scharrer, was a concert pianist. Due to her parents' occupations, Gurney grew up in a large house with 42 boys that was often host to visiting artists and musicians. As a teenager, she attended the Dr Challoner's High School in Little Chalfont, Buckinghamshire.

In 1938, Gurney entered the Webber Douglas Academy of Dramatic Art to study acting. World War II postponed her acting career, and she did not make her stage debut until 1945 with the Birmingham Repertory Theatre, working under director Barry Jackson. At the close of the war, she quickly became a regular presence on the West End, making her debut in 1946 as Lynne Hartley in Warren Chetham-Strode's The Guinea Pig at the Criterion Theatre.

In the same year, she married novelist Denys Rhodes, but their marriage ended in 1950 in divorce. They had one daughter together, actress Sharon Gurney (a daughter-in-law of Michael Gough). Her other stage credits during this time include Lady Katherine in A Sleeping Clergyman at the Criterion Theatre in 1947, the fiancée in Peter Watling's Rain on the Just at the Old Vic in 1948, and Thea in Black Chiffon at the Westminster Theatre in 1949.

=== Early career ===
Gurney continued to appear regularly on the London stage during the 1950s. Several of her stage appearances were broadcast live on television on the BBC Sunday Night Theatre including The Tragedy of Pompey the Great (1950), The Doctor's Dilemma (1951), and Eden End (1951) among others. In 1952, she portrayed the roles of Mabel in First Person Singular and Mrs. Pless in The Trap at the Duke of York's Theatre. She also appeared as Alice in The Voysey Inheritance at the Arts Theatre and as Mrs. George Lamb in Caro William at the Embassy Theatre. The following year she played Valerie Carrington in the groundbreaking play Carrington VC at the Westminster Theatre. She remained busy over the next several years appearing as Avice Brunton in The Bombshell (1954), Portia in The Merchant of Venice (1955) and Olivia in The Chalk Garden (1956). In 1959, she replaced Celia Johnson as Hilary in The Grass is Greener at the St. Martin's Theatre.

Gurney also began to appear in both films and television in the 1950s. Her first film role was in Tom Brown's Schooldays (1951). This was followed by the films The Blakes Slept Here (1953), Room in the House (1955), Port Afrique (1956) and A Touch of Larceny (1959). Her television credits at this time included Night River (1955), The Scarlet Pimpernel (1956), Colonel March of Scotland Yard (1956), Our Mutual Friend (1958) and The Moonstone (1959).

=== Mid career ===
Gurney remained active in theatre, television and film during the 1960s and also on radio. In 1961 she played Marian in the BBC radio adaptation of L.P. Hartley’s novel The Go-Between. On the stage she starred opposite John Gielgud as Hermione in the 1965 production of The Winter's Tale and as Lady Chiltern in An Ideal Husband at the Piccadilly Theatre in 1966. She played Hermione opposite Gielgud in the Caedmon Records recording of The Winter's Tale, and the Queen in their recording of Richard II, also with Gielgud. She starred as well in the 1969 touring production of George Bernard Shaw's On the Rocks opposite David Tomlinson, Robert Flemyng and Jack Hulbert.

Her later film roles included Funeral in Berlin (1966) and I Want What I Want (1972). Her television credits include Dixon of Dock Green (1961), Katy (1962), The Saint (1963), Compact (1963), ITV Play of the Week (1964), Game for Three Losers (1965), The Wednesday Thriller (1965), Mystery and Imagination (1966), The Rat Catchers (1966), Armchair Thriller (1967), The Portrait of a Lady (1968), ITV Saturday Night Theatre (1969), The Way We Live Now (1969), Upstairs, Downstairs (1971–1973), Dangerous Corner (1974) and Fall of Eagles (1974).

Gurney appeared as Mrs Darling in Peter Pan at the Palladium in 1975. In 1977, Gurney made her American stage debut off-Broadway as Mrs. Clandon in George Bernard Shaw's You Never Can Tell at the Roundabout Theatre in New York City.

=== Later career ===
In 1980, Gurney made her Broadway debut in Major Barbara. She returned to Broadway twice more in The Dresser (1981–1982) and Breaking the Code (1988). She also appeared in a major role in the Noël Coward play Mr. and Mrs. Edgehill in 1985, and in 1992-1993 she was in Peter Hall's production of Terence Rattigan's Separate Tables in Bath and London.

She also appeared in the television productions A.D. (1985), Lost Empires (1986), Anastasia: The Mystery of Anna (1986), Richard III (1989), and Little Sir Nicholas (1990).

She died in Norfolk, England on 24 November 2001 from pneumonia due to Alzheimer's disease.

== Sources ==
- Playbill, 30 November 2001
- McKinley, Jesse (30 November 2001). "Rachel Gurney, 81, Actress; 'Upstairs, Downstairs' Matriarch". The New York Times.
- The Independent, 24 November 2001
