= Lily Kann =

German actress (1893–1978)

Kann in The White Unicorn (1947)

Lily Hertha Kann (26 October 1893 – 2 November 1978) was a German-born British actress. She appeared in the West End in the play Background by Warren Chetham-Strode (1950).

== Selected filmography ==
- The Flemish Farm (1943) as Farm Wife
- Escape to Danger (1943) as Karin Möller
- Latin Quarter (1945) as Maria
- Woman to Woman (1947) as Concierge
- The Woman in the Hall (1947) as Baroness von Soll
- The White Unicorn (1947) as Shura
- Mrs. Fitzherbert (1947) as Queen Charlotte
- Now Barabbas (1949) as Woman
- I Was a Male War Bride (1949) as Innkeeper's Wife (uncredited)
- The Third Man (1949) as Nurse (uncredited)
- The Clouded Yellow (1950) as Minna Cesare
- A Tale of Five Cities (1951) as Charlady - (US: 'A Tale of Five Women')
- Flesh and Blood (1951) as Sister Maria (uncredited)
- Twice Upon a Time (1953) as Mrs. Muller
- Background (1953) as Brownie
- A Day to Remember (1953) as Grandmere
- Eight O'Clock Walk (1954) as Mrs. Zunz
- Twist of Fate (1954) as Nicole
- Betrayed (1954) as Jan's Grandmother
- A Kid for Two Farthings (1955) as Mrs. Kramm (uncredited)
- Foreign Intrigue (1956) as Blind Housekeeper
- Cat Girl (1957) as Anna, Brandts' Housekeeper
- Nowhere to Go (1958) as Anna Berg (uncredited)
- Whirlpool (1959) as Frau Steen
- No Trees in the Street (1959) as Mrs. Sarah Jacobson
- The House of the Seven Hawks (1959) as Gerta
- The Long Shadow (1961) as Old Lady
- Theatre 625 (1965) as Old Woman
