= Background (play) =

1950 play

- Written by: Warren Chetham-Strode
- Original language: English
- Genre: Drama
- Setting: London suburbs, present day

Premiere
- Date premiered: 8 May 1950
- Place premiered: Theatre Royal, Brighton

Background is a 1950 play by the British writer Warren Chetham-Strode. It examines the effect on the children of a married couple going through a divorce.

It premiered at the Theatre Royal, Brighton before transferring to the Westminster Theatre in London's West End where it ran for 84 performances between 17 May and 29 June 1950. The original West End cast included Colin Douglas, Andre Morell, Lily Kann and Valerie White. It was directed by Norman Marshall.

== Film adaptation ==
In 1953 it was made into a film of the same title directed by Daniel Birt and starring Valerie Hobson, Philip Friend and Norman Wooland. Chetham-Strode co-wrote the screenplay.

== Bibliography ==
- Goble, Alan. The Complete Index to Literary Sources in Film. Walter de Gruyter, 1999.
- Wearing, J.P. The London Stage 1950-1959: A Calendar of Productions, Performers, and Personnel. Rowman & Littlefield, 2014.
