= Abdul Shamji =

Ugandan-born businessman

Abdulhamid Jamal Shamji (December 1932 – 2010), commonly known as Abdul Shamji, was a Ugandan-born businessman active in Britain. After fleeing Uganda during the 1972 expulsion of Asians under Idi Amin, Shamji rebuilt his business interests in Britain through the Gomba group of companies. His holdings came to include interests in property, transport, hotels, manufacturing, and London theatres, including the Mermaid Theatre and the Garrick Theatre.

Shamji became publicly associated with the collapse of Johnson Matthey Bankers in the mid-1980s, when Gomba emerged as one of the bank's major debtors. In 1989, he was sentenced to 15 months in prison for perjury after lying about his assets during court proceedings connected to the bank's collapse.

== Early life ==
Shamji was born in Uganda to an Indian family. In a 1987 interview with India Today, Shamji, then 54, said he had left school at 13 to work in the family store in the Ugandan village of Gomba. According to Patrick Radden Keefe, Shamji had built a conglomerate of companies in Uganda before he and his family sought refuge Britain in 1972, after Amin ordered the expulsion of Asians from Uganda.

== Business career ==
After arriving in Britain, Shamji rebuilt the Gomba business group. Keefe described the group's later activities as including shipping, trucking, mining, hotels, manufacturing, and other ventures. In litigation arising from the Johnson Matthey Bankers affair, the Court of Appeal described Shamji as controlling, directly or indirectly, a group of about 18 companies known as the Gomba Group.

The group's interests included London theatre properties. The Independent reported in 1993 that Gomba Holdings had owned, at various times, the Duchess Theatre, the Garrick Theatre, part of Wembley Stadium, and the Mermaid Theatre. Keefe similarly wrote that Shamji's holdings included the Mermaid and Garrick theatres and, for a time, a part interest in Wembley Stadium.

One of Gomba's better-known theatre interests was the Mermaid Theatre at Puddle Dock in the City of London. The Independent reported that the theatre was bought by Shamji through Gomba Holdings after founder Bernard Miles encountered financial difficulties. In the early 1990s, Shamji's son Akbar Shamji became involved in the theatre's management.

== Political connections, Johnson Matthey Bankers affair and conviction ==
Shamji hosted a fundraising dinner with Margaret Thatcher for the Anglo Asian Conservative Society on 2 March 1978. His links to Conservative Party circles became politically significant after the collapse of Johnson Matthey Bankers in 1984. The bank was rescued by the Bank of England and Shamji was among the bank's major borrowers. A Court of Appeal judgment stated that Shamji and his group owed Johnson Matthey Bankers more than £21 million and that the bank had become increasingly concerned about the state of its security. India Today described the Johnson Matthey Bankers affair as one of the major scandals in London's financial and banking world.

In 1985, The Sunday Times reported that Labour MPs planned to focus on loans from Johnson Matthey Bankers to Shamji and described him as a claimed personal friend of Thatcher and Norman Tebbit. In a 1986 House of Commons debate, Labour MP Brian Sedgemore alleged that Shamji had given money through his companies to Conservative Party funds.

Shamji denied wrongdoing in relation to the bank's collapse and told India Today in 1987 that he had become "a convenient excuse" for the bank's failure. In 1989, however, he was convicted of perjury. During court questioning about his finances, Shamji had denied having Swiss bank accounts, but six such accounts were discovered. He was jailed for 15 months.

== Death ==
Shamji died in 2010.

His life received extensive coverage in Patrick Radden Keefe's 2024 New Yorker article and the 2026 book London Falling, also by Keefe, which focused on the 2019 death of Zac Brettler. Shamji's son Akbar is a major part of that story and was with Brettler just before he died.
