= Background (1953 film) =

British drama by Daniel Birt

- Original British quad poster
- Directed by: Daniel Birt
- Written by: Warren Chetham-Strode; Don Sharp
- Based on: Background by Warren Chetham-Strode
- Produced by: Herbert Mason
- Starring: Valerie Hobson; Philip Friend; Norman Wooland
- Cinematography: Arthur Grant
- Edited by: John Trumper
- Production company: Group 3 Films
- Distributed by: ABPC (UK)
- Release date: 3 November 1953 (UK)
- Running time: 83 minutes
- Country: United Kingdom
- Language: English

Background (U.S. Edge of Divorce) is a 1953 British domestic drama film dealing with the effects of divorce, directed by Daniel Birt and starring Valerie Hobson, Philip Friend and Norman Wooland. It marked the film debut of Barbara Hicks. It was based on the 1950 play of the same title by Warren Chetham-Strode, who also wrote the screenplay for the film, with Don Sharp. It was made at Southall Studios, with sets designed by the art director Michael Stringer. The film was produced by Group 3 Films and distributed by ABPC.

Background was released to cinemas in the United Kingdom on 3 November 1953.

== Plot ==
John and Barbie Lomax have been married for almost 20 years, but the marriage has seemingly reached breaking point. After leaving the army, John has been working hard on making a career for himself as a barrister, which takes up all of his time and attention, leaving him exhausted and irritable. He acts intolerantly and dismissively towards Barbie and their three children, and the marital relationship comes under intolerable strain as the couple argue, bicker and snipe constantly at each other. Realising that the poisoned atmosphere is not good for the children to experience, they agree that in the circumstances divorce is the lesser evil.

They are unprepared for how badly the children react when they break the news. The children jump to the conclusion that family friend 'Uncle' Bill Ogden is to blame, assuming from what they have seen that he has designs on Barbie. While this is true, it does not explain the depth of unhappiness felt by both their parents at their increasingly acrimonious relationship.

As the wheels of the divorce are set in motion, John and Barbie are faced with coming to agreement about what should happen to the children, whether all should be given to the custody of one parent, or whether they should be split up. Caught in the middle, the children take matters into their own hands, forcing their parents to reassess the wisdom of the path they are about to take. Finally they are forced into an about-face after realising the destructive effect of divorce on the children. They decided they must stay together for the sake of the family resolving to put on a brave face and live at least partly a life of pretense. However, a final moment when they laugh together for the first time in years about the relief and reconciliation of their children suggests that love and understanding might return to the marriage after all.

== Cast ==
- Valerie Hobson as Barbie Lomax
- Philip Friend as John Lomax
- Norman Wooland as Bill Ogden
- Janette Scott as Jess Lomax
- Mandy Miller as Linda Lomax
- Jeremy Spenser as Adrian Lomax
- Lily Kann as Brownie
- Helen Shingler as Mary Wallace
- Thora Hird as Mrs. Humphries
- Louise Hampton as Miss Russell
- Jack Melford as Mackay
- Richard Wattis as David Wallace
- Joss Ambler as judge
- Lloyd Lamble defence counsel
- Barbara Hicks as Mrs. Young
- Ernest Butcher as clerk

== Production ==
It was an early writing credit for Don Sharp who became a noted director. Sharp had just written Child's Play for Group Three, produced by Herbert Mason. Group Three had bought the screenrights to the play Background by Warren Chetham-Strode and Mason was going to produce the film version. Sharp says Mason and Warren did not get on, so Sharp was brought on to do the screenplay in collaboration with Warren. Sharp also worked on the film as an assistant to Mason.

== Reception ==
The Monthly Film Bulletin wrote: "A reasonably competent and well-acted film has been made from a play which can only be regarded as artificial and contrived. If it pretends to serve as a moral guide to intending divorcées it should have tackled a more serious problem in order to make its point; but to moralise around a situation where it seems that the married couple need only a little common sense to solve their problems is a waste of talent. Mandy Miller as the youngest daughter is adorably natural, and to some extent outweighs the irritating convention so often found in English films of strongly 'characterising' children from the outset – boy with gun, girl who loves horses and serious child who writes stories. Valerie Hobson looks very beautiful and distressed as the wife."

Kine Weekly wrote: "Valerie Philip Friend and Norman Wooland competently handle the basic triangle theme, but it is the juvenile characters, brilliantly portrayed by Janette Scott, Jeremy Spenser and Mandy Miller, tiny heroine of Mandy, who steal the picture and ram its message home. Seldom, if ever, has this ticklish and urgent subject been treated with greater sympathy and insight. Human and entertaining sermon in celluloid, it's bound to mend many a broken marriage. Outstanding general booking and woman's film."

A contemporary review in the Glasgow Herald wrote: "A heroic effort is made to apportion the blame fairly ... yet intrinsically, one has to admit, the film has no great success."
