= Filippo Del Giudice =

Italian film producer (1892–1963)

- Born: 26 March 1892
- Died: 1 January 1963 (aged 70)
- Occupation: Film producer

Filippo Del Giudice (26 March 1892 – 1 January 1963), born in Trani, Italy, was an Italian film producer, as well as being a lawyer and legal advisor and film producer.

== Life ==
In December 1932, Giudice fled from Italy to England in order to avoid imprisonment for his political beliefs. Anti-Semitic legislation, introduced later, would have caused him still more problems had he stayed in Italy; his production company wasn't allowed to film there because it was believed the board was operated by Jewish people.

Giudice didn't know English when he arrived in Britain; he taught himself, by his own account poorly, while teaching the children of Italian waiters in Soho. In 1937 he founded the company Two Cities Films with Mario Zampi; he was initially its legal advisor, later becoming a film producer. After the release of the 1939 film French Without Tears (based on a play by Terence Rattigan) and the 1940 anti-Nazi film Freedom Radio, Giudice and Zampi were interned in 1940 as 'enemy aliens'. He was later released from internment to work on the 1942 film In Which We Serve, which was written by Noël Coward. MI5 supplied him with Ann Elwell as his secretary; as well as scriptwriting, she translated for him when he took on the role of art director. During this period, Giudice produced the 1944 film Mr. Emmanuel, which is the only World War II film with a Jewish subject.

Despite being a producer, Giudice stated that he knew nothing about filmmaking, considering himself an "administrator of talents" rather than a producer. Film directors he collaborated with included Anthony Asquith, David Lean, Carol Reed and Laurence Olivier. Giudice was also an administrator for Pilgrim Pictures on the 1948 film The Guinea Pig and the 1949 film Private Angelo.

In 1950, Giudice moved back to Italy and never produced another film.

Zampi and Del Giudice had a long feud which had its origins in both men being interned during World War Two. Zampi became wealthy while Del Giudice was broke; in 1958, the latter was living in a room in London saying "I have nothing".

In 1963, he died in Florence on New Year's Day.

== Production filmography ==
- French Without Tears (1939)
- The First of the Few (1942)
- In Which We Serve (1942)
- This Happy Breed (1944)
- Mr. Emmanuel (1944)
- Henry V (1944)
- The Way to the Stars (1945)
- Men of Two Worlds (1946)
- Odd Man Out (1947)
- Hamlet (1948)
