= Mermaid Theatre =

Former theatre in London, England

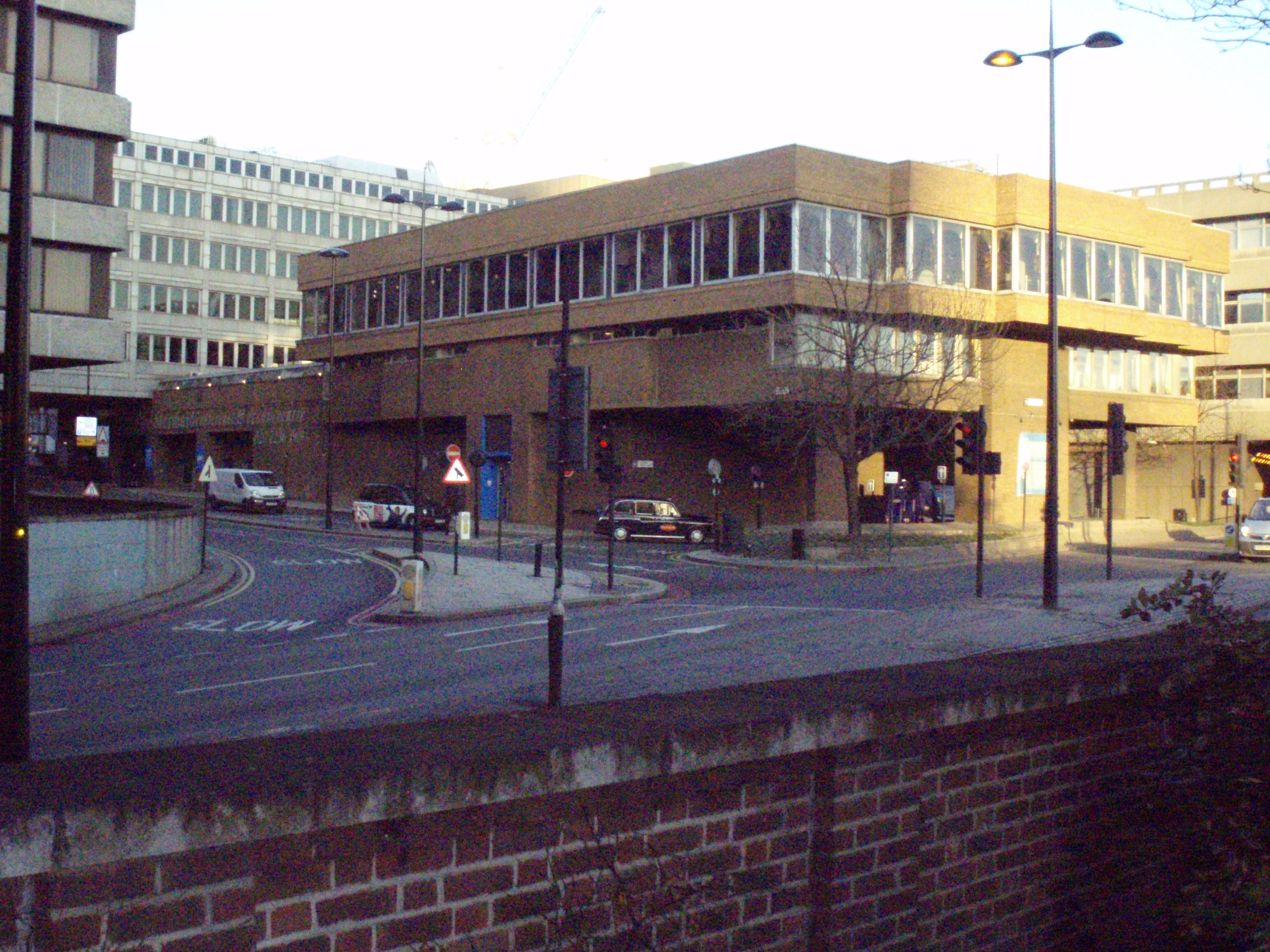
- The former Mermaid Theatre, now primarily a conference centre
- Interactive map of Mermaid Theatre
- Address: Puddle Dock; London, EC4; United Kingdom
- Coordinates: 51.511306°N 0.101972°W
- Owner: Blackfriars PD Ltd
- Capacity: 600-seated on one level
- Type: Open-stage
- Current use: Conference centre and recording
- Public transit: Blackfriars

Construction
- Opened: 28 May 1959
- Closed: 2003
- Architect: Ove Arup

Website
- www.the-mermaid.co.uk

The Mermaid Theatre was a theatre encompassing the site of Puddle Dock at Blackfriars in the City of London, and the first built in the City since the time of Shakespeare. It was one of the first new theatres to abandon the traditional stage layout; instead of this, a single tier of seats surrounded the stage on three sides.

== History ==
The 20th-century theatre was the life's work of actor Bernard Miles and his wife, Josephine Wilson. His original Mermaid Theatre was a large hall at his home, Duff House, St John's Wood, in north west London. It seated 200 people, and during 1951 and 1952 was used for concerts, plays and an opera production of Dido and Aeneas with Kirsten Flagstad, Maggie Teyte and Thomas Hemsley, conducted by Geraint Jones, which was recorded by His Master's Voice. For the third season in 1953, the Mermaid Theatre was moved to the Royal Exchange.

Miles was encouraged to build a permanent theatre and, raising money from public subscriptions, and his revenues from publicity spots for the Egg Marketing Board, he oversaw the creation of the new building on land next to Puddle Dock formerly occupied by a warehouse that had been damaged by bombing in the Second World War.

The new Mermaid Theatre opened on 28 May 1959 with a production of Lock Up Your Daughters and it was the venue for many other productions, such as Cowardy Custard and an annual staging of Treasure Island, with Miles reprising his role of Long John Silver, which he also played in a television version. The Mermaid Theatre also ran the Molecule Club, educating children about science.

Other notable productions include the 1978 première of Whose Life Is It Anyway?, with Tom Conti and Rona Anderson. and also in 1978 Every Good Boy Deserves Favour by Tom Stoppard.

The area around Puddle Dock was completely redeveloped in the late 1970s / early 1980s. New office blocks were built around the theatre, Puddle Dock was filled in, and replaced by the road that retains the name of the old dock, and the theatre was completely redeveloped. When the Mermaid reopened in 1981, the first production was a musical version of the 17th century play Eastward Ho!. This was a financial disaster and lost £80,000, and over the next two years, losses kept increasing to reach a total of £650,000.

The Royal Shakespeare Company sometimes transferred Stratford productions to the Mermaid, including a residency during 1987 which saw the staging of seven plays.

Gomba Holdings, a property company owned by Ugandan Asian businessman Abdul Shamji and his family, which claimed to have interests in the Garrick and Duchess theatres as well as Wembley Stadium, bought a 97-year lease for the theatre in the mid-1980s for ₤675,000, in the hope of redeveloping the Puddle Dock site. Bernard Miles' tenure as honorary artistic advisor was terminated and the theatre's importance declined. In 1989, Abdul Shamji was sentenced to 15 months in prison over his involvement in the Johnson Matthey bank collapse.Josephine Wilson died in 1990 and Bernard (by then Lord) Miles died in 1991, financially destitute.

Shamji's son, Akbar Shamji, was named general manager in 1993, and brought a short-lived production of the one-man show Ali! to the stage. Marc Sinden was appointed artistic director in 1993, opening the Bernard Miles Studio as a second performance area, but left the next year. This period has been covered in more detail in the book London Falling.

After a further change of ownership the theatre was slated for demolition in 2002 as part of redevelopment plans. It had fallen into disuse, the buildings being used more often as a conference centre than a theatre. A preservation campaign by actors and other supporters attempted to reverse the decision. In April 2003 Ken Livingstone, the Mayor of London, ordered the council to block the demolition. The BBC Concert Orchestra used it for occasional concerts, and the BBC recorded a weekly radio show, Friday Night Is Music Night, which showcased musicians such as the violinist Nigel Kennedy and singer Josh Groban.

== Loss of theatre status, and redevelopment plans ==
In September 2008, the Corporation of London City Planning Committee, against the advice of the Theatres Trust and various actors, producers and artistic directors, granted a certificate that stripped the former playhouse of its theatre status. The move may save the developer £6 million worth of Section 106 funding, which it had previously agreed to pay in lieu if it closed the 600-seat Mermaid; the company could be released from the obligation because no theatrical productions have taken place for more than ten years. The existing plans would see the Puddle Dock building converted into a conference centre and fitness suite, plus offices, a nightclub and retail and restaurant space. Campaigners were concerned that the entire building might be demolished. The former chairman of the Save London's Theatres Campaign, John Levitt, called the decision "a tragedy" and "sheer meanness".

As of 2026, the Mermaid Theatre exists as a conference centre, called The Mermaid London.

== See also ==
- Mermaid Theatre of Nova Scotia
