= The Odd Man trilogy =

British television series (1960–1963)

- Created by: Edward Boyd
- Starring: Moultrie Kelsall; William Mervyn; Keith Barron; Geoffrey Toone; Edwin Richfield; Sarah Lawson
- Country of origin: United Kingdom
- No. of series: 9
- No. of episodes: 72

Production
- Running time: 50 minutes

Original release
- Network: ITV
- Release: 19 October 1960 – 5 December 1968

The Odd Man is a police series produced by Granada Television, running over four series between 1960 and 1968. The character of pompous police Chief Inspector Charles Rose (William Mervyn) at the start of series 3 cemented the show's popularity, and The Odd Man turned out to be the first in a trilogy lasting most of the 1960s, during which Rose's character slowly developed and became increasingly genial as they progressed.

== The Odd Man ==
This show ran for four series, and originally dealt with the investigations of theatrical-agent-cum-detective Steve Gardiner (played by Geoffrey Toone in the first season, replaced by Edwin Richfield thereafter). Gardiner was the "odd man" of the series' title, and his encounters with the police in the form of Chief Inspector Gordon (Moultrie Kelsall) are featured in series 1 and 2. Gordon was replaced by Chief Inspector Charles Rose (William Mervyn) from series three onwards. Rose was assisted by Detective Sergeant Macbride (Alan Tilvern) who lasted just the one season. He was replaced by Detective Sergeant Swift (played by Keith Barron) for the final series in 1963.

== It's Dark Outside ==
The characters of Rose and Swift were then given their own series, It's Dark Outside, which ran for two series in 1964 and 1965 with a total of 16 episodes. The stories were edgy, with Barron's character frequently feeling repressed and confused by the turn of events, which often had him one step behind his superior's superior approach and attitude. Barron left at the end of series 1, to be replaced by Anthony Ainley in the role of Detective Sergeant Hunter. All eight episodes of the first series survive, but only two episodes of the second series survive. All ten surviving episodes were released on DVD by Network in 2013.

== Mr Rose ==
The third and final series in the trilogy was Mr Rose, and saw the title character enjoying retirement in Eastbourne. Rose attempted to write his memoirs but found himself being drawn into private detection instead. The show ran for three series with a total of 24 episodes.

The theme tune for Mr Rose was by John Snow, and was issued on a single as a cover version by Roy Budd on the Pye Records label in 1967. A separate cover version was recorded on the album Time For TV by Brian Fahey and his Orchestra, on the Studio 2 Stereo label. John Snow's original recording was recorded by the De Wolfe mood music library, and is not commercially available.
