= First Person Singular (play) =

Play by Lewis Grant Wallace

First Person Singular is a play by Lewis Grant Wallace. The play tells the story of a convoluted affair between an eminent old novelist and a resentful younger writer. The work premiered at the Duke of York's Theatre in the West End of London on 4 February 1952. The cast included Irene Handl as Miss Oakley and Rachel Gurney as Mabel.

== Sources ==
- Irene Handl at filmreference.com
- The Independent, 24 November 2001
