= Chance of a Lifetime (1950 film) =

1950 British film by Bernard Miles

- Opening titles
- Directed by: Bernard Miles
- Written by: Walter Greenwood; Bernard Miles
- Produced by: Bernard Miles
- Starring: Basil Radford; Niall MacGinnis; Bernard Miles
- Cinematography: Eric Cross
- Edited by: Peter Price
- Music by: Noel Mewton-Wood
- Distributed by: British Lion; Pilgrim Pictures
- Release dates: 1950 (UK); 14 March 1951 (U.S.)
- Running time: 89 minutes
- Country: United Kingdom
- Language: English
- Budget: £150,000

Chance of a Lifetime is a 1950 British film directed and produced by Bernard Miles and starring Miles, Basil Radford and Niall MacGinnis. It was written by Miles and Walter Greenwood.

Its depiction of industrial relations was seen as controversial and distributors initially refused to screen it.

== Plot ==
In the times of austerity after the Second World War, Dickinson works hard to try to keep his failing agricultural implements factory going. His disgruntled workers do not appreciate his efforts, however, and also resent Bland, his bullying works manager. Dickinson has a suggestion box installed after workers complain he never listens to them but, after Bland threatens latecomers, the only response is insulting. When Bland sacks Bolger, the author of the suggestion, the workforce go on strike. Dickinson confronts them and, in the heat of the moment, tells them he works much harder than they do and dares them to run the business themselves. Baxter gets the others to take him up on his suggestion, and they elect Stevens and Morris to do just that. Dickinson is taken aback, but reluctantly agrees to let the factory to them on condition that they pay him annually 5% of the capital value of the business, equivalent to £120 a week.

Works manager Bland, Dickinson's secretary Miss Cooper, the foreman, and a few others quit. That night, Dickinson's solicitor and doctor advise him to use the situation as an opportunity to take a holiday and recommend to Miss Cooper that she return to work.

A supplier changes its credit terms, causing a financial crisis. Also, the local bank manager is unwilling to extend a temporary loan, so Stevens goes to the bank's head office in the City of London and speaks to the bank's managing director, Sir Robert Dysart, but without success. Finally, Stevens and Morris put up the deeds to their own homes, Palmer raises money on his insurance policy, and, after some grumbling, some of the other workers make up the required sum.

After press publicity of this worker-owned factory, a trade delegation from the (fictitious) country of Xenobia contact the factory to arrange a demonstration of the "one-way plough" that Dickinson had been working on. Miss Cooper invites Dickinson to attend, but he merely watches from a distance. The Xenobians are impressed and order 800 ploughs for £50,000. After the contract is signed, Adam insists the only way to fulfil such a large order is to focus their efforts solely on the plough, to the exclusion of other work they have contracted from long-time customers. Morris returns to the factory floor rather than be a party to abandoning their other customers, and Adam takes his place.

Meanwhile, a few of the workers, led by Baxter, are unhappy with the new, lower pay rate that has been imposed. Two trades union men are called in to sort things out, and Baxter eventually drops his objections.

Dickinson shows up at the factory late at night and is invited in for a cup of cocoa by the watchman. He meets Miss Cooper and has a chat with her about how things are going. He learns that a steel supplier is delaying delivery, so the next day he goes to see Garrett, its managing director. Garrett strongly disapproves of the experiment and refuses to help it along, but Dickinson suggests that a newspaper article about its sabotaging, with a photograph of Garrett, would not be in his best interests. The steel is delivered.

Then the Xenobian government announces that "in view of their foreign currency position, all outstanding import licences are suspended". Dickinson returns and is able to find other foreign customers for the ploughs. Disaster averted, he goes to leave, only for Stevens to offer him his old position back. Dickinson accepts a lesser position, and indicates that Adam should be the managing director. Stevens walks out, saying he prefers to do real work.

== Cast ==
- Basil Radford as Dickinson
- Niall MacGinnis as Frank Baxter
- Bernard Miles as George Stevens
- Julien Mitchell as Ted Morris
- Kenneth More as Adam Watson
- Geoffrey Keen as Harry Bolger
- Josephine Wilson as Miss Cooper
- John Harvey as Bland
- Russell Waters as Palmer
- Patrick Troughton as Kettle
- Hattie Jacques as Alice
- Peter Jones, Bernard Rebel and Eric Pohlmann as the Xenobians
- Amy Veness as Lady Davis
- Stanley Van Beers as Calvert
- Norman Pierce as Franklin
- Gordon McLeod as Garrett
- Compton Mackenzie as Sir Robert Dysart
- Nigel Fitzgerald as Pennington
- Alastair Hunter as Groves (Dickinson's doctor)
- Mollie Palmer as Millie
- George Street as 1st Trade Union man
- Stanley Rose as 2nd Trade Union man
- Erik Chitty as Silas Pike
- Leonard Sharp as Mitch
- John Boddington as bank clerk
- Hilda Fenemore, Helen Harvey, Peggy Ann Clifford, Sam Kydd, Jim Watts, Henry Bryce, Basil Cunard, Anthony Halfpenny, Howell Davies and Donald Tandy as the workers

== Response ==
The Rank and Associated British cinemas refused to show the film, claiming it was too political and "would annoy employers". The Ministry of Labour and the British Employers Confederation argued that the film would damage management-employee relations, particularly in the light of renewed industrial unrest in early 1950. The chairman of the Board of Trade, Harold Wilson, argued in cabinet that this was overreaction and the cabinet approved the film's release, using the 1948 Film Act to ensure the film was shown on the major cinema circuit.

=== Critical ===
The Monthly Film Bulletin wrote: "This salutory moral (though it will displease the more extremely left) is pleasantly conveyed, if without any great force. What gives the film its distinction is its general authenticity, and the liveliness of its playing. The grubby little engineering works, with its dirt, untidiness and out-of-date planning, is staffed with solidly common-sensible, realistically humorous workers, whose reactions to each turn of the story ring amusingly and sometimes rather movingly true. The actors (all excellent) play with a joyous lack of staginess; and if the direction is not entirely firm in its grasp of the whole, individual sequences are well and sensitively presented. The photography combines most expertly the everyday tones called for by the subject, and the clarity and contrast necessary for full dramatic expression. With all its limitations of approach, this is an achievement of considerable promise."

=== Box office ===
The film was an unexpected flop at the box office. A Mass-Observation survey at the time found that only 1/3 of the people who watched the film had intended to do so, with the majority of attendees doing so either out of habit [in attending the cinema] or because they had nothing better to do.

== Accolades ==
It was nominated for the 1951 BAFTA for Best British Film.
