= Young Mrs. Barrington =

1945 play

- Original language: English
- Written by: Warren Chetham-Strode
- Genre: Drama
- Setting: Kingston-Upon-Thames, present day

Premiere
- Date: 14 May 1945
- Place: Lyceum Theatre, Edinburgh

Young Mrs. Barrington is a 1945 play by the British writer Warren Chetham-Strode. It concerns the return home of a fighter pilot following the Second World War.

It premiered at the Lyceum Theatre, Edinburgh before transferring to the Winter Garden Theatre in London's West End where it ran for 140 performances between 11 September 1945 and 3 January 1946. The original West End cast included Peter Hammond, Ivan Samson, Tom Gill, Margaret Barton, Elliott Mason, Joan Haythorne and Leueen MacGrath.

== Bibliography ==
- Wearing, J.P. The London Stage 1940-1949: A Calendar of Productions, Performers, and Personnel. Rowman & Littlefield, 2014.
