= The Guinea Pig (Chetham-Strode) =

1946 play by Warren Chetham-Strode

The Guinea Pig is a three-act play by Warren Chetham-Strode. The work premiered in London's West End at the Criterion Theatre in 1946, starring Rachel Gurney as Lynne Hartley. Following its successful sixteen month run, the play was adapted into a 1948 film, starring Richard Attenborough and Sheila Sim.

== Original West End cast ==
- Dennis Stringer, M.A. – William Mervyn
- Fitch – George Bryden
- Grimmett – Denholm Elliott
- Knox – Roger Braban
- lloyd Hartley, M.A. – Cecil Trouncer
- Lynne Hartley – Rachel Gurney
- Mr Read – Duncan Lewis
- Mrs Read – Joan Hickson
- Mrs. Hartley – Edith Sharpe
- Nigel Lorraine, B.A. – Robert Flemyng
- Read – Derek Blomfield
