= Expulsion of Asians from Uganda =

1972 expulsion of Indians by Idi Amin

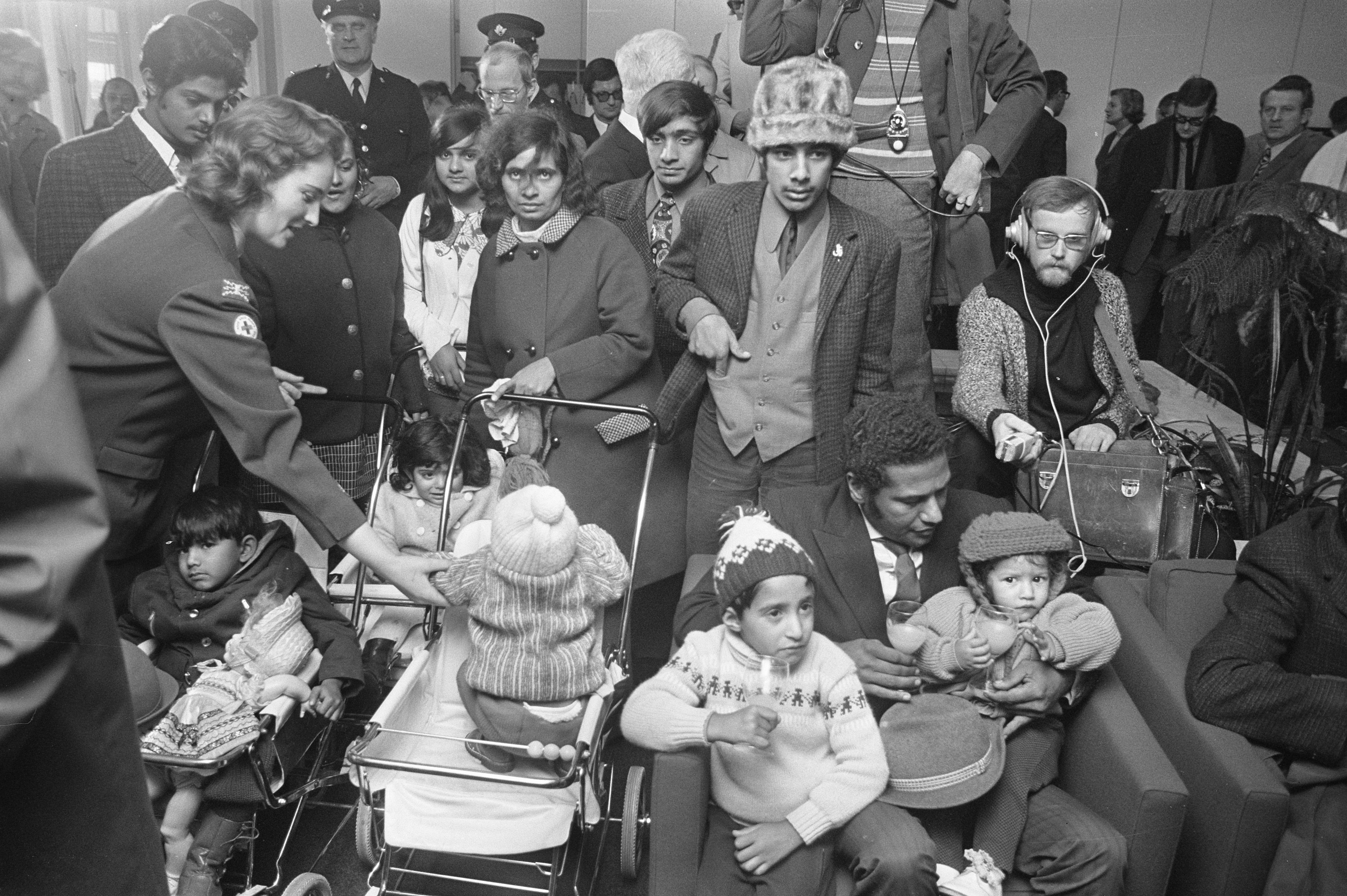
Indians expelled from Uganda arriving at Amsterdam Airport Schiphol, November 1972

In early August 1972, the President of Uganda Idi Amin ordered the expulsion of his country's Indian minority, giving them 90 days to leave the country. At the time, South Asians in East Africa were simply known as "Asians". Having first arrived in the late 1800s as migrant laborers to build the Uganda Railway, they would go on to dominate trade in the country.

The original August 4 order applied only to British subjects of South Asian origin, but was expanded on August 9 to citizens of Bangladesh, India, and Pakistan. It was later expanded to include 20,000 Ugandan citizens of South Asian ethnicities (later rescinded). At the time of the expulsion, there were about 80,000 individuals of Indian descent in Uganda, of whom 23,000 had their applications for citizenship both processed and accepted. The expulsion took place against the backdrop of anti-Indian sentiment and black supremacy in Uganda, with Amin accusing a minority of the Indians of disloyalty, non-integration, and commercial malpractice, claims that Indian leaders disputed. Amin defended the expulsion by arguing that he was "giving Uganda back to ethnic Ugandans".

Many of those who were expelled were citizens of the United Kingdom and Colonies, and 27,200 immigrated to the United Kingdom. Of the other refugees who were accounted for, 6,000 went to Canada, 4,500 ended up in India and 2,500 went to nearby Kenya or to Pakistan. Departing Asians were limited to $120 and 485 lb (220 kg) of property. In total, some 5,655 firms, ranches, farms, and agricultural estates were confiscated, along with cars, homes and other household goods.

The expulsion did significant damage to both Uganda's economy and international reputation. Many world leaders condemned the expulsion, and several nations, particularly the United Kingdom and India, cut diplomatic ties as a result. The economy suffered a significant drop in gross domestic product. Following the accession of Yoweri Museveni to the presidency, some Indian Ugandans returned.

== Background ==
The presence of Indians in Uganda was the result of deliberate choices by the British administration that ruled Uganda from 1894 to 1962. They were brought to the Uganda Protectorate by the British to work "between Europeans and Africans in the middle rungs of commerce and administration". In addition, in the 1890s, 32,000 labourers from British India were brought to Southeast Africa under indentured labour contracts to work on the construction of the Uganda Railway. Most of the surviving Indians returned home, but 6,724 individuals decided to remain in the African Great Lakes after the line's completion. At the time of the expulsion, there were approximately 80,000 individuals of South Asian descent in Uganda, of whom 23,000 had had their applications for citizenship both processed and accepted. Up to 50,000 were British passport holders, though Amin himself used the apparently exaggerated figure of 80,000 British passport holders in his initial expulsion speech.

The British had invested in the education of the Asian minority, in preference to that of indigenous Ugandans. By the early 1970s, many Indians in Southeast Africa and Uganda were employed in the sartorial and banking businesses, and Indophobia was already engrained by the start of Amin's rule in February 1971. While not all Ugandan Indians were well off, they were on average better off than the indigenous communities, constituting 1% of the population while earning a fifth of the national income. Indians were stereotyped as "merely traders" and labelled as "dukahwallas" (traders, an occupational term that degenerated into an anti-Indian slur during Amin's time), who tried to cheat unsuspecting purchasers and looked out only for their own families. Racial segregation was institutionalised. Gated ethnic communities offered elite and exclusive healthcare and schooling services. Additionally, the tariff system in Uganda had historically been oriented toward the economic interests of South Asian traders.

Milton Obote's government had pursued a policy of "Africanisation" which included policies targeted at Ugandan Indians. The 1968 Committee on the "Africanisation in Commerce and Industry", for example, had made far-reaching Indophobic proposals and a system of work permits and trade licences was introduced in 1969 to restrict the role of non-citizen Indians in economic and professional activities. Nevertheless, Amin's policies represented a significant acceleration. In August 1971, Amin announced a review of the citizenship status awarded to Uganda's Asian community, followed by the declaration of a census of Uganda's Asian population in October that year. In order to resolve the "misunderstandings" regarding the role of Uganda's Asian minority in society, he convened an Indian 'conference' for 7–8 December. In a memorandum presented on the second day of the conference, he set out his hope that "the wide gap" between Ugandan Indians and Africans would narrow. While paying tribute to Indians' contribution to the economy and the professions, he accused a minority of the Asian population of disloyalty, non-integration and commercial malpractice, claims Indian leaders disputed. On the vexed question of citizenship, he said his government would recognise citizenship rights already granted, but all outstanding applications for citizenship (which by this point were thought to number more than 12,000) would be cancelled.

This expulsion of an ethnic minority was not the first in Uganda's history as the country's Kenyan minority, numbering approximately 30,000, had been expelled in 1969–70.

== Expulsion ==
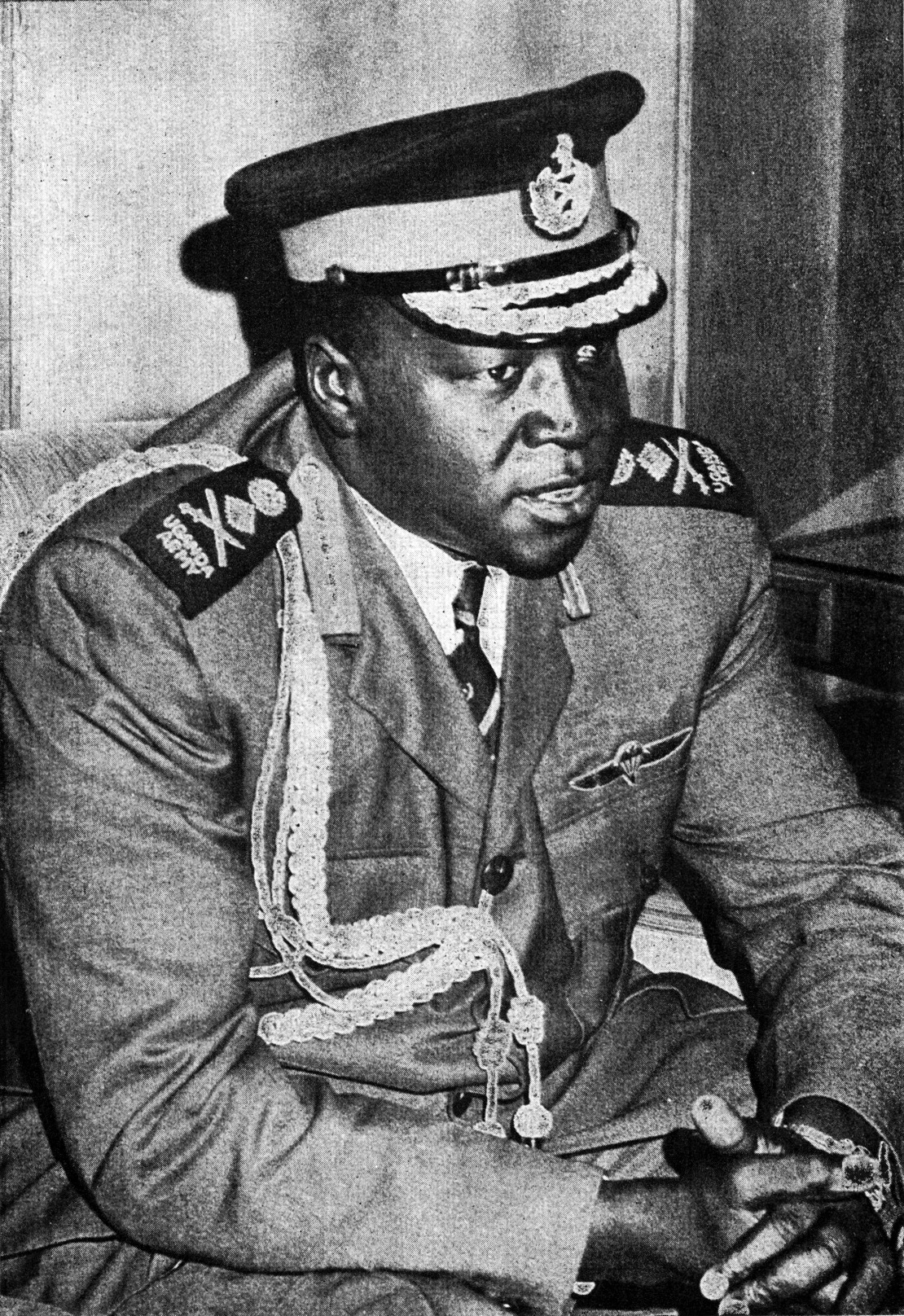
Idi Amin, pictured shortly after the expulsion

On 4 August 1972, Amin declared that Britain would need to take on the responsibility for caring for British subjects who were of Indian origin, accusing them of "sabotaging Uganda's economy and encouraging corruption". The deadline for British subjects to leave was confirmed as three months, which came to mean 8 November. On 9 August, the policy was expanded to include citizens of India, Pakistan and Bangladesh. The position of the 23,000 Indians who had been granted Ugandan citizenship (and in particular those who held no other citizenship) was less clear. Not originally included, on 19 August, they were seemingly added to the list, before being re-exempted three days later following international protest. Many chose to leave rather than endure further intimidation, with only 4,000 known to have stayed. Exemptions for certain professions were added, then later removed.

The precise motivation for the expulsion remains unclear. Some of Amin's former supporters suggest that it followed a dream in which, he claimed, Allah had told him to expel them, as well as plot vengeance against the British government for refusing to provide him with arms to invade Tanzania. Amin defended the expulsion by arguing that he was giving Uganda back to the ethnic Ugandans:

We are determined to make the ordinary Ugandan master of his own destiny, and above all to see that he enjoys the wealth of his country. Our deliberate policy is to transfer the economic control of Uganda into the hands of Ugandans, for the first time in our country's history.

— Idi Amin, quoted in Uganda: a modern history.

Ugandan soldiers during this period engaged in theft and physical and sexual violence against the Indians with impunity. Letters from Asians told of being stopped on the way out by bands of Ugandan soldiers. All of their belongings would be taken and the men would be forced to lie down on the ground while the women were raped. Furthermore, there were tellings of Asians who had been kidnapped by soldiers, of families who paid fortunes for the returns of the male members, and of other families who lost their father or brothers because they had no money to pay a ransom. Restrictions were imposed on the sale or transfer of private businesses by Ugandan Indians and on 16 August Amin made it clear that after he was done with Indian-owned businesses, European-owned businesses would be next.

== Consequences ==
The Indians only milked the cow, but they did not feed it to yield more milk. There are now Black faces in every shop and industry. All the big cars in Uganda are now driven by Africans, and not the former bloodsuckers. The rest of Africa can learn from us.

— President Idi Amin

Amin's decrees drew immediate worldwide condemnation, including from India. The Indian government warned Uganda of dire consequences, but took no action when Amin's government ignored the ultimatum. Initially, India maintained diplomatic ties with Uganda but later severed diplomatic relations with Amin's regime. The United Kingdom froze a £10.4 million loan which had been arranged the previous year; Amin ignored this. Journalists Tony Avirgan and Martha Honey described the expulsion as "the most explicitly racist policy ever adopted in black Africa."

Many of the Ugandan Asians were citizens of the United Kingdom, or UK Colonies or commonwealth countries. 27,200 refugees subsequently immigrated to the United Kingdom. Refugees were initially housed in empty military camps, such as Heathfield Camp, near Honiton in Devon, and Houndstone Camp, near Yeovil in Somerset.

Of the other refugees who were accounted for, 6,000 went to Canada, 4,500 ended up in India and 2,500 went to nearby Kenya. Malawi, Pakistan, West Germany and the United States took 1,000 refugees each, with smaller numbers immigrating to Australia, Austria, Sweden, Norway, Mauritius and New Zealand. About 20,000 refugees were unaccounted for. Only a few hundred remained behind.

Reluctant to expand its newly introduced immigration quota, the British government had sought agreement from some of its remaining overseas territories (including Bermuda, the Virgin Islands, British Honduras, Hong Kong, Seychelles and the Solomon Islands) to resettle them; however, only the Falkland Islands responded positively. Kenya and Tanzania similarly closed their borders with Uganda to prevent an influx of refugees.

Some of those expelled were Nizari Ismaili Muslims. The Aga Khan IV, the Imam of Nizari Ismailis, phoned his acquaintance Canadian Prime Minister Pierre Trudeau. Trudeau's government agreed to allow thousands of Nizari Ismailis to immigrate to Canada. The exodus of Ugandan Indians took on a new level of urgency in the September following a telegram from Amin to the UN Secretary General Kurt Waldheim, in which it appeared that Amin was sympathetic to Hitler's treatment of Jews and an airlift was organised. The UN dispatched the Executive Secretary of the Economic Commission for Africa, Robert K. A. Gardiner, who attempted in vain to convince Amin to reverse his decision.

A military committee was made responsible for the reallocation of the confiscated property, though Amin also personally redirected some material. In total, some 5,655 firms, ranches, farms, and agricultural estates were reallocated, along with cars, homes and other household goods. For political reasons, most (5,443) were reallocated to individuals, with 176 going to government bodies, 33 being reallocated to semi-state organisations and 2 going to charities. Possibly the biggest winner was the state-owned Uganda Development Corporation, which gained control over some of the largest enterprises, though both the rapid nature of the growth and the sudden lack of experienced technicians and managers proved a challenge for the corporation, resulting in a restructuring of the sector in 1974–75. Though some of the property fell into the hands of Uganda's traditional businessmen, most of the direct beneficiaries were soldiers and government officials. By the time Amin's regime collapsed in 1979, it was rumoured that there were no more than 50 Indians in Uganda.

=== Economic effects ===
Despite Amin's claims of returning control of the economy to ordinary Ugandans, the expulsion greatly harmed the economy of the country. The gross domestic product of Uganda fell by 5% between 1972 and 1975, while manufacturing output tumbled from 740 million Ugandan shillings in 1972 to 254 million shillings in 1979. At the time of their deportation Indians owned 90% of the country's businesses and accounted for 90% of Uganda's tax revenue. The real value of salaries and wages plummeted by 90% in less than a decade following the expulsion, and although some of these businesses were handed over to native Ugandans, Uganda's industrial sector, which was seen as the backbone of the economy, was damaged due to the lack of skilled workers.

== Aftermath ==
The expulsion drew widespread condemnation on the international stage and strained Uganda’s diplomatic relations, particularly with the United Kingdom and India. The British government facilitated the resettlement of approximately 27,000 Ugandan Asians who held British passports, while others relocated to Canada, India, and several other countries.

In the wake of the expulsion, Leicester became a focal point for resettling Ugandan Asians. Initially, the city placed advertisements in Ugandan newspapers advising against relocating there - citing limited housing and employment opportunities - but these efforts were largely ineffective, as many people preferred to join existing South Asian communities in the city. Around 6,000 Ugandan Asians ultimately settled in Leicester, supported by local council initiatives and community grants that helped refurbish neighbourhoods and establish businesses.

In the decades following the expulsion, Uganda's leadership took steps to repair relations with the Asian community. Under President Yoweri Museveni, policies were introduced in the 1990s to encourage the return of expelled families and the restoration of seized properties. Some former residents and their descendants have since returned to Uganda.

== In popular culture ==
The expulsion of Asians from Uganda has been referenced or depicted in various works, including:

- In Angels (BBC television series), the character Sita Patel is portrayed as having fled Uganda with her family.
- Charas (1976 Bollywood film), is set against the backdrop of the expulsion.
- Rise and Fall of Idi Amin (1981 film by Sharad Patel), dramatizes the events surrounding Idi Amin’s regime.
- Mississippi Masala (1991 film by Mira Nair), portrays an Indian family that resettles in Mississippi after fleeing Uganda.
- The Last King of Scotland (1998 novel by Giles Foden; 2006 film adaptation), depicts Amin's rule, including the expulsion.
- In Life on Mars (2006 BBC television series), the characters Ravi and Deepak Gandhi is portrayed as having fled Uganda during Amin's expulsion of South Asians in 1972.
- The 2025 movie Christmas Karma has the expulsion as a central narrative in the story of the main character.
- The story of Ugandan refugee Abdul Shamji was covered in detail in the 2026 book London Falling by Patrick Radden Keefe.

== See also ==
- Non-resident Indian and person of Indian origin
- Indian diaspora in Southeast Africa
- Zanzibar Revolution
- Deportation
- Remigration

== Bibliography ==
- Avirgan, Tony; Honey, Martha (1983). War in Uganda: The Legacy of Idi Amin. Dar es Salaam: Tanzania Publishing House. ISBN 978-9976-1-0056-3.
- Geddes, John (27 October 2010), "A holy man with an eye for connections", Maclean's
- Henckaerts, Jean-Marie; Sohn, Louis B. (1995), Mass Expulsion in Modern International Law and Practice, Dordrecht: Martinus Nijhoff, ISBN 90-411-00725
- Jamal, Vali (June 1976), "Expulsion of a minority: essays on Ugandan Asians (Review)", The Journal of Modern African Studies, 14 (2), Cambridge University Press: 357–361, doi:10.1017/s0022278x00053404, JSTOR 160072, S2CID 155061156
- Jørgensen, Jan Jelmert (1981), Uganda: a modern history, Taylor & Francis, ISBN 978-0-85664-643-0
- Kasozi, Abdu Basajabaka Kawalya; Musisi, Nakanyike; Sejjengo, James Mukooza (1994), The Social Origins of Violence in Uganda, 1964–1985, Montreal: McGill-Queen's University Press, p. 119, ISBN 0-7735-1218-7
- Mutibwa, Phares Mukasa (1992), Uganda since independence: a story of unfulfilled hopes, United Kingdom: C. Hurst & Co., p. 67, ISBN 1-85065-066-7
- Patel, Hasu H. (1972), "General Amin and the Indian Exodus from Uganda", Issue: A Journal of Opinion, 2 (4): 12–22, doi:10.2307/1166488, JSTOR 1166488
- Sherwood, Marika (2014). "Robert Kweku Atta Gardiner (1914–1994): An unrecognised Ghanaian Pan-Africanist Par-Excellence". Contemporary Journal of African Studies. 2 (1). Accra: Institute of African Studies, University of Ghana. ISSN 2343-6530.(subscription required)
- Seftel, Adam, ed. (2010) [1st pub. 1994]. Uganda: The Bloodstained Pearl of Africa and Its Struggle for Peace. From the Pages of Drum. Kampala: Fountain Publishers. ISBN 978-9970-02-036-2.
