= Moira Verschoyle =

Irish novelist and playwright

- Born: Moira Hamilton Verschoyle; 17 December 1903; Limerick
- Died: 13 January 1985; Rye, East Sussex, England
- Spouse: Warren Chetham-Strode (m. 1927; died 1974)

Moira Hamilton Verschoyle (17 December 1903 – 13 January 1985) was an Irish novelist and playwright.

== Life and career ==
Verschoyle was born in Limerick and raised in Castle Troy on the banks of the River Shannon, where she was privately educated by governesses. She was born into the Verschoyle family, a prominent landed family of Dutch descent, the daughter of Captain Frederick Thomas Verschoyle, who had been a 2nd Brig. South Irish Div. R.A. and was now a Land Agent, and his wife Hilda Caroline Hildyard Blair, of royal Plantagenet descent. Her grandfather was Hamilton Verschoyle. Verschoyle had an older brother Frederick and an older sister Hilda. Verschoyle worked on the London stage during and after the Second world war.

Verschoyle married Horace de Heriz Smith (later Heriz-Smith) of Bordighera, Italy, in Penang on 3 April 1922. He was an experienced planter in Malaya and they divorced. She returned to the UK within a few years and he later remarried.

While based in Sussex Verscholye married the writer Reginald Warren Chetham-Strode on 16 July 1927 with whom she had one son, who died young. Along with the novels and autobiography she produced and the work in theatre, Verschoyle also wrote articles for newspapers. She died in January 1985 in Hastings.

== Bibliography ==
- Children in Love (London: Hodder & Stoughton 1961)
- Daughters of the General (London: Hodder & Stoughton 1963)
- So Long to Wait: an Irish Childhood (London: Geoffrey Bles 1960), autobiography
- ITV play of the week- The Young May Moon (1958)
