= John Miles (racing driver) =

British racing driver (1943–2018)

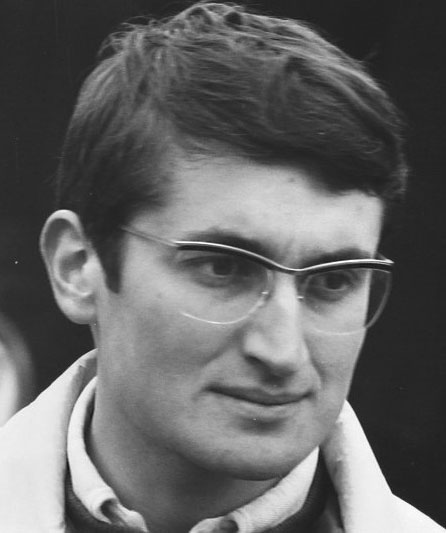
- Miles in 1970
- Born: 14 June 1943
- Died: 8 April 2018 (aged 74)

Formula One World Championship career
- Nationality: (United Kingdom) British
- Active years: 1969–1970
- Team: Lotus
- Entries: 15 (12 starts)
- Championships: 0
- Wins: 0
- Podiums: 0
- Career points: 2
- Pole positions: 0
- Fastest laps: 0
- First entry: 1969 French Grand Prix
- Last entry: 1970 Italian Grand Prix

John Jeremy Miles (14 June 1943 – 8 April 2018) was a British racing driver from England. He participated in 15 Formula One World Championship Grands Prix, making his debut on 6 July 1969, in the Lotus 63 4-wheel drive F1 car for which he was the official Team Lotus test driver. He scored a total of two championship points with a fifth place in the 1970 South African Grand Prix.

== Early career ==
In 1963/64, John Jeremy Miles (known as John "Diva" Miles and not to be confused with John "Turner" Miles) began his serious racing career and became the overall champion in the Redex Sports Car Championship driving a front engined Diva GT. A second season in the Diva this time supported by John Willment was also successful. He then went to win the 1966 Autosport Championship in the Willment sponsored Lotus Elan 26R with 15 outright wins from 17 races. This particular Elan 26R car was never beaten until the advent of the mid engined competitors such as the Chevron. At Boxing Day Brands 1966 he debuted the new Lotus 47GT and subsequently raced the works F3 Lotus 41 and long chassis 41X and GT 47 during 1967 and 1968 for the works team – winning four international F3 events in 1968.

== Formula One ==
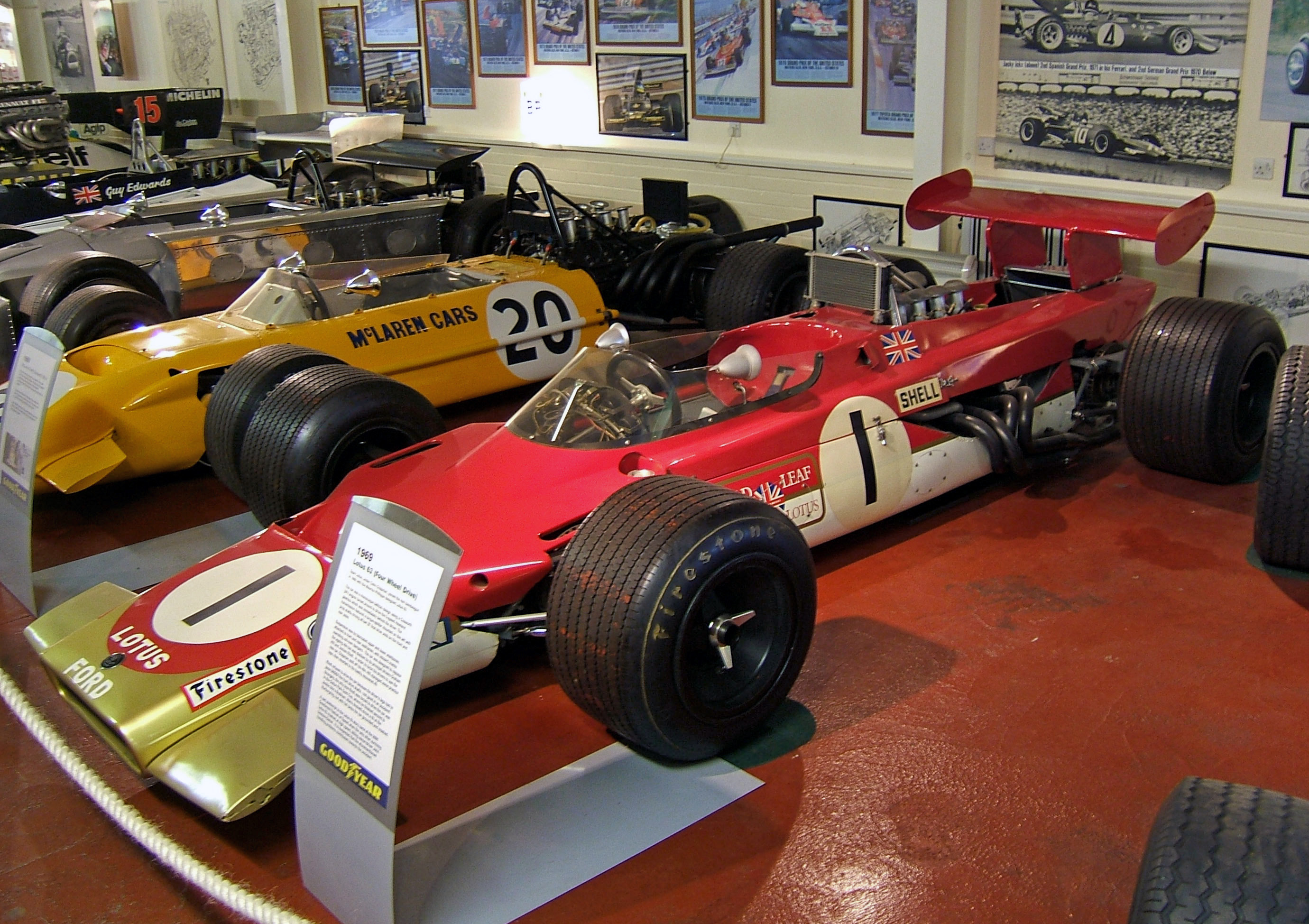
Lotus 63 4WD

In 1969, Miles had to develop the Lotus 63 4WD car while World Champion Graham Hill and Jochen Rindt refused to drive this design, considering it a death trap. In five GPs, Miles finished only once, in tenth place. In between, the car was given twice to Mario Andretti, but he did not finish either. Miles did qualify mid-grid for the Canadian GP at Mosport, where the difficult combination of fast sweeping bends suited the 4-wheel-drive Lotus 63, which was a 'disaster' on twisty tracks.

After Graham Hill had broken his legs in late 1969, he did not return to Team Lotus, driving Lotus cars for the Rob Walker Racing Team instead. Miles was promoted to number two Lotus F1 driver behind Jochen Rindt for the 1970 Formula One season. In the 1970 South African Grand Prix, where a total of five Lotus cars were entered, he finished fifth in a Lotus 49 with Hill behind him. Miles had driven most of the race with petrol leaking over him, but Colin Chapman expressed dissatisfaction he had not taken Beltoise for fourth. For the Spanish GP, the new Lotus 72 was entered, but Miles failed to qualify for the race in which Rindt had to retire early. Due to the problems with the 72, the updated Lotus 49C was used in Monaco, with Miles driving a few practice laps in the 72, and failing to qualify in the 49C. Graham Hill was slower in practice, but had a guaranteed grid place as a past World Champion, and was allocated Miles's 49C for the race, which was won by Rindt. In Belgium, Miles raced the 72, while Rindt relied on the old 49C, and both had to retire. In Zandvoort, the 72 finally proved to be competitive, with Rindt qualifying on pole and winning, while Miles qualified and finished seventh in the race, driving a more experimental and difficult, version of the 72, which retained much of Chapman's anti-squat and anti-dive roadholding features, and was a handful, if having excellent brakes. Miles made an excellent start, jumping into fifth and was running in the opening laps with eight of the greatest GP drivers nose to tail, held behind by good line, brakes and skilful blocking or the luck of a tyro in auto sport. Regazzoni got past when Miles missed a gear on lap 6 and Piers Courage passed Miles on lap 12. After that an intense midfield duel developed as Miles fought to hold off Jean-Pierre Beltoise and John Surtees. Rindt required real skill to lap the trio threading through on laps 30–33, ultimately just flagged past by his teammate. Beltoise was not able to get the Matra past the deep braking Miles's 72 until the slippery lap 49, Surtees also got past on the lap, but was immediately retaken by the Miles 72 and Surtees did not finally secure the 6th place point, until he got past four laps from the flag with the 72's brakes effectively gone. In France, Rindt won again in the 72 despite an injury, while Miles finished outside the points once again, although on the same lap as his team leader.

By now, it was evident that Miles was thoroughly overshadowed by his team leader who won five races to earn the F1 World Championship that year. According to Miles, Chapman regarded him 'as a sort of grease monkey' and paid him a mere 300 pounds per race, out of which he had to pay his own travel expenses, occasionally supplemented by a roll of notes, on request, from Chapman's back pocket to get Miles back to England.

For the British GP, Lotus cars founder and Team Lotus principal Chapman started to enter a third car with Emerson Fittipaldi. With the reliable 49C, the young Brazilian finished his first three GPs while Miles had to retire in both races, dogged by a hairline fracture in the water pipes, leading to retirement at quarter distance and slowing his progress during the race at Brands and Hockenheim, when finally running with a 72, close to Rindt's 72 specifications, he would have been reasonably competitive. Miles qualified seventh at Brands Hatch, 1.2 seconds slower than Rindt on pole, who beat Brabham on the finishing line to win the British GP. Rindt scored a final victory at Hockenheim where Miles qualified tenth and diced with Surtees and Denny Hulme, until the Lotus 72's Cosworth blew. With the three car team, Miles's car did not get the same attention as Chapman obviously saw Fittipaldi as the future, as his old Lotus was seriously prepared and finished eighth and fourth in the British and German races, while the failure to discover, the fracture leaking water saw Miles retire at both races and had blown three Cosworth V8s during the practice sessions. During the Hockenheim practice sessions, Miles spent many laps providing a slipstream tow to enable Fittipaldi to qualify. Rindt said "a monkey could have won in the car" (the 72) and told Miles who qualified tenth, two seconds behind Rindt, that he was mystified than Miles didn't drive faster, as two seconds slower was no safer in Rindt's view. This may have been true in a Lotus 72 as Miles qualified on the fifth row again at the next race in Austria, a new, high speed lethal circuit. Miles found himself without braking on the fourth lap: 'coming through the downhill before the final corner, my left front brake shaft broke'. Matters came to a head at the Italian GP, where Chapman ordered Miles to follow Rindt in running a new Lotus 72 without front and rear wings to take advantage of the Monza circuit's long straights and fast, low-downforce corners. Miles reluctantly complied but was concerned by the wingless 72's handling on the straights. His teammate Rindt was killed when one of the brake shafts on his new Type 72 failed and his car veered off the track, ploughing into the steel barrier which was placed too high for the revolutionary wedge design of the 72. Rindt, who had only recently acquiesced to wearing a simple lap belt, slid underneath and had his throat cut by the belt buckle. That was too much for Miles, who was widely regarded as too cerebral and sensitive to fit Chapman's idea of a race driver, and he left the team. The team skipped the next race in Canada, and at Watkins Glen, Reine Wisell drove the second Lotus car, while Fittipaldi won, thereby securing both championships for Lotus.

Miles was signed for BRM for 1971, Lou and Jean Stanley recruiting him at the Dorchester, a precursor to the signing of Niki Lauda, (as seen in the doco/drama film, 'Rush') with Lou making a phone call to Bourne to receive the apparent reply that yet another 20 hp was being produced by the BRM V12 on the dyno. He was employed mainly as a test driver and raced in two non-championship rounds at Brands Hatch and Hockenheim in the BRM and also won the British sports car championship that year in 2-litre sports cars – in a Chevron B19 he beat a competitive field, including Chris Craft and Wilson Fittipaldi.

A qualified mechanical engineer, Miles later made a name for himself working for Lotus's road car division. He wrote a column, "Miles Behind The Wheel", for Autocar magazine, giving his road impressions of sportier cars.

== Personal life ==
Miles was the son of the actors Bernard Miles and Josephine Wilson.

Miles died on 8 April 2018, due to complications following a stroke.

== Miles Music ==
In 1985, Miles founded 'Miles Music', a jazz recording company, with Peter Watts. In 1996, their release of the CD Tamburello by Peter King won the BT Jazz CD of the year award. It was inspired by the death of Ayrton Senna.

== Racing record ==
=== Complete British Saloon Car Championship results ===
(key) (Races in bold indicate pole position; races in italics indicate fastest lap.)

Year	Team	Car	Class	1	2	3	4	5	6	7	8	9	10	DC	Pts	Class
1967	Team Lotus	Ford Cortina Lotus	C	BRH; Ret	SNE ?	SIL ?	SIL; DNS	MAL; Ret†	SIL; 6	SIL; 6	BRH ?	OUL	BRH	10th	24	**3rd**

† Events with 2 races staged for the different classes.

=== Complete Formula One World Championship results ===
(key)

Year	Entrant	Chassis	Engine	1	2	3	4	5	6	7	8	9	10	11	12	13	WDC	Points
1969	Gold Leaf Team Lotus	Lotus 63	Cosworth V8	RSA	ESP	MON	NED	FRA; Ret	GBR; 10	GER	ITA; Ret	CAN; Ret	USA	MEX; Ret			NC	0
1970	Gold Leaf Team Lotus	Lotus 49C	Cosworth V8	RSA; 5		MON; DNQ											19th	2
1970	Gold Leaf Team Lotus	Lotus 72	Cosworth V8		ESP; DNQ		BEL; Ret	NED; 7	FRA; 8	GBR; Ret	GER; Ret						19th	2
1970	Gold Leaf Team Lotus	Lotus 72C	Cosworth V8									AUT; Ret	ITA; DNS	CAN	USA	MEX	19th	2

=== Complete Formula One non-championship results ===
(key)

Year	Entrant	Chassis	Engine	1	2	3	4	5	6	7	8
1970	Gold Leaf Team Lotus	Lotus 72	Cosworth V8	ROC	INT; 17	OUL					
1971	Yardley Team BRM	BRM P153	BRM V12	ARG	ROC; 7	QUE	SPR	INT	RIN; Ret	OUL	VIC
