= An Honourable Murder =

1960 British film by Godfrey Grayson

- DVD cover
- Directed by: Godfrey Grayson
- Written by: Brian Clemens; Eldon Howard
- Produced by: Edward J. Danziger; Harry Lee Danziger
- Starring: Norman Wooland; Margaretta Scott; Lisa Daniely
- Cinematography: James Wilson
- Edited by: Desmond Saunders
- Music by: Albert Elms; Leon Young
- Production company: Danziger Productions
- Distributed by: Warner-Pathé Distributors
- Release date: 9 May 1960
- Running time: 69 minutes
- Country: United Kingdom
- Language: English

An Honourable Murder is a 1960 British second feature ('B') drama film directed by Godfrey Grayson and starring Norman Wooland, Margaretta Scott and Lisa Daniely. It was written by Brian Clemens and Eldon Howard and produced by The Danzigers.

It is a modern reworking of William Shakespeare's Julius Caesar set in the corporate world of the City of London.

== Cast ==
- Norman Wooland as Brutus Smith
- Margaretta Scott as Claudia Caesar
- Lisa Daniely as Paula
- Douglas Wilmer as Cassius
- Philip Saville as Mark Anthony
- John Longden as Julian Caesar
- Marion Mathie as Portia Smith
- Colin Tapley as Casca
- Kenneth Edwards as Trebon
- Arnold Bell as Ligar

== Critical reception ==
The Monthly Film Bulletin wrote: "The idea of slotting Shakespeare's Julius Caesar into a big-business melodrama fails to generate much tension, partly through laggardly development, partly because the acting is too undistinguished to create its own conviction. The whole thing, especially the ending, cannot avoid seeming glib and contrived for its own sake. Nevertheless, for a Danziger production, this second feature has a certain novelty interest."

Kine Weekly wrote: "The picture's leading characters' names are, it will be observed, borrowed from Shakespeare, but its tale definitely has topicality. Norman Wooland contributes a moving performance as the conscience-stricken Brutus; Philip Saville convinces as the loyal Mark; Douglas Wilmer registers as the shifty Cassius; and Lisa Daniely and Marion Mathie display genuine feeling as Paula and Portia. Its distaff side is never sold short, there are tense moments and its ending is highly dramatic, if a trifle pat. The Financial Times and Woman in one, it's definitely a sound speculation."

Picture Show wrote: "Average entertainment."

Leslie Halliwell said: "Not entirely successful, but full marks for trying."
