= Marion Mathie =

English actress (1925–2012)

- Born: Marion Douglas Mathie; 6 February 1925; Kingston upon Thames, Surrey, England
- Died: 20 January 2012 (aged 86); Petworth, West Sussex, England
- Occupation: Actress
- Years active: 1956-1992
- Spouse: John Humphry (m. 1963; died 2007)
- Children: 2

Marion Mathie (6 February 1925 – 20 January 2012) was an English actress who appeared in the last four series of Rumpole of the Bailey as his fearsome wife, Hilda ("She Who Must Be Obeyed") and many other roles in other productions, including Mrs Susan Wyse in the London Weekend Television adaptation of the Mapp and Lucia books by E. F. Benson. She had a memorable cameo as the concerned wife of a compromised diplomat in the classic episode Six Days in Department S (1968).

== Filmography ==
Year	Title	Role	Notes
1960	No Kidding	Helen Treadgold	
1960	An Honourable Murder	Portia Smith	
1962	Lolita	Miss Lebone	
1968	Dracula Has Risen from the Grave	Anna	
