= The Guinea Pig (film) =

1948 film by Roy Boulting

- Australian film poster
- Directed by: Roy Boulting
- Written by: Warren Chetham-Strode (play); Bernard Miles; Roy Boulting
- Produced by: John Boulting
- Starring: Richard Attenborough
- Cinematography: Gilbert Taylor
- Edited by: Richard Best
- Music by: John Wooldridge
- Production companies: Boulting Brothers; Pilgrim Pictures
- Distributed by: Pathé Pictures International (UK)
- Release date: 27 October 1948
- Running time: 97 minutes
- Country: United Kingdom
- Language: English
- Budget: £252,418
- Box office: £224,694 (UK)

The Guinea Pig (U.S. title The Outsider) is a 1948 British film directed by Roy Boulting and starring Richard Attenborough, Sheila Sim and Bernard Miles. The screenplay was by Warren Chetham-Strode and Bernard Miles, in association with Boulting, adapted from the 1946 play of the same name by Chetham-Strode. It was produced by John Boulting.

== Plot ==
The "guinea pig" of the title is 14-year-old Jack Read, a tobacconist's son who, following the Fleming Report, is given a scholarship to Saintbury, an exclusive public school. Read's uncouth behaviour causes him difficulties in fitting into the school.

== Cast ==
- Richard Attenborough as Jack Read
- Sheila Sim as Lynne Hartley
- Bernard Miles as Mr. Read
- Cecil Trouncer as Lloyd Hartley
- Robert Flemyng as Nigel Lorraine
- Edith Sharpe as Mrs. Hartley
- Joan Hickson as Mrs. Read
- Timothy Bateson as Tracey
- Herbert Lomas as Sir James Corfield
- Anthony Newley as Miles Minor
- Anthony Nicholls as Mr. Stringer
- Wally Patch as Uncle Percy
- Hay Petrie as Peck
- Oscar Quitak as David Tracey
- Kynaston Reeves as the Bishop
- Olive Sloane as Aunt Mabel
- Peter Reynolds as Grimmett

== Production ==
The film was produced by Pilgrim Pictures, a company set up by Filippo Del Guidice. It was financed by a "mystery industrialist".

The school location used in the film was Sherborne School, a public school in Dorset.

Richard Attenborough was aged 25 when he played the 14-year-old Jack Read.

== Reception ==
=== Box office ===
British trade papers called the film a "notable box office attraction" in British cinemas in 1949. As of 1 April 1950 the film earned distributor's gross receipts of £173,052 in the UK of which £121,824 went to the producer. The film made a loss of £130,594.

=== Critical ===
The Monthly Film Bulletin wrote: "The photography is good, and the sets are so realistic that one can almost smell the school atmosphere, and it is difficult to believe that Saintbury does not really exist. Besides this, the acting is of a high standard; if Richard Attenborough, as the guinea pig, does not look quite as young as they would have us believe, it is doubtful if anyone of the right age, even if available, could have improved on his moments of half boastful, half pathetic youth. There is a competent performance 'rom Robert Flemyng as a young master; he appears to be thoroughly at home in his part. Altogether Roy Boulting has directed a very satisfying ninety-seven minutes' entertainment."

The New York Times critic Bosley Crowther, at the time of the film's first American release, was unimpressed. According to Crowther, "the details are highly parochial, the attitudes of the characters are strangely stiff, the accents and idioms are hard to fathom—and the exposition is involved and tedious".

The Radio Times Guide to Films gave the film 2/5 stars, writing: "Richard Attenborough makes light of his 20-odd years to play a boy half his age in this class-barrier melodrama. ... Wallowing in the clichés of establishment privilege, director Roy Boulting makes few demands of a cast that almost sleepwalks through familiar characterisations.

In British Sound Films: The Studio Years 1928–1959 David Quinlan rated the film as "good", writing: "Skilful human dialogue made this film a big popular success."

A reviewer for Time Out called it, "solid entertainment, even if barely convincing".

According to AllMovie, the film was controversial at the time of its release "because of the presence of an alleged profanity in its dialogue".
