= In Which We Serve =

1942 film by Lean and Coward

- US Theatrical release poster
- Directed by: Noël Coward; David Lean
- Written by: Noël Coward
- Produced by: Noël Coward
- Starring: Noël Coward; John Mills; Bernard Miles; Celia Johnson
- Narrated by: Leslie Howard
- Cinematography: Ronald Neame
- Edited by: Thelma Connell; David Lean
- Music by: Noël Coward; Clifton Parker
- Distributed by: British Lion Films
- Release date: 17 September 1942 (UK)
- Running time: 115 minutes
- Country: United Kingdom
- Language: English
- Budget: £240,000
- Box office: £300,000 (Commonwealth) $2 million (US rentals)

In Which We Serve is a 1942 British propaganda war film directed by Noël Coward and David Lean, who made his debut as a director. It was made during the Second World War with the assistance of the Ministry of Information.

The screenplay by Coward was inspired by the exploits of Captain Lord Louis Mountbatten, who was in command of the destroyer HMS Kelly when it was sunk during the Battle of Crete.

Coward composed the music as well as starring in the film as the ship's captain. The film also starred John Mills, Bernard Miles, Celia Johnson and Richard Attenborough in his first screen role.

In Which We Serve received the full backing of the Ministry of Information, which offered advice on what would make good propaganda and facilitated the release of military personnel. The film is a classic example of wartime British cinema through its patriotic imagery of national unity and social cohesion within the context of the war.

== Plot ==
The film opens with the narration: "This is the story of a ship". In 1941 HMS Torrin engages German transports in a night-time action during the Battle of Crete, but at dawn, the destroyer comes under attack from German bombers. A critical hit forces the crew to abandon the ship as it rapidly capsizes. Some of the officers and ratings manage to find a life raft while being intermittently strafed by German planes.

The story of the ship is told in flashbacks, using their memories. The first person to reveal his thoughts is Captain Kinross, who recalls the summer of 1939 when the Torrin is being rushed into commission as the possibility of war becomes a near certainty.

The Torrin spends a quiet Christmas in the north of Scotland during the Phoney War, but in 1940 it fights its first engagement during the Battle of Narvik. During that action, the ship is struck by a torpedo. The damaged Torrin is towed back to port, all the time being harried by dive bombers.

Safely back in harbour, Captain Kinross tells the assembled ship's company that during the battle nearly all the crew performed as he would expect, but one man did not. However, he surprises everyone when he says that he let him off with caution as he feels that, as Captain, he failed to make him understand his duty.

Returning to the present, the float survivors watch the capsized Torrin take on water and slowly sink. The raft is again strafed by German planes and some men are killed or wounded. Shorty Blake recalls in flashback how he met his wife-to-be, Freda, on a train while on leave. She is related to the Torrin's affable Chief Petty Officer Hardy. When both men return to sea, Freda moves in with Hardy's wife and mother-in-law.

The Torrin participates in the Dunkirk evacuation of the British Expeditionary Force (portrayed in the film by the 5th Battalion of the Coldstream Guards). Blake gets a letter to say that Freda has given birth to his son during the Plymouth Blitz, but that Hardy's wife and mother-in-law were killed. He has to tell Hardy, who is writing a letter home, the bitter news.

The survivors on the life raft watch the Torrin finally sink. Captain Kinross leads a final "three cheers" for the Torrin. A British destroyer soon begins rescuing the men. Captain Kinross talks to the survivors and collects addresses from the dying.

Telegrams are sent to the crew's loved ones. Kinross addresses the ship's survivors in a military depot in Alexandria in Egypt. He tells them that although they lost their ship and many friends, who now "lie together in fifteen hundred fathoms", he notes that these losses should inspire them to fight even harder in the battles to come. Captain Kinross then shakes hands with all the ratings as they leave the depot. When the last man goes, the emotionally tired captain silently acknowledges his surviving officers before walking away.

An epilogue concludes: Bigger and stronger ships are being launched to avenge the Torrin; Britain is an island nation with a proud, indefatigable people; Captain Kinross is now in command of a battleship. Its massive main guns fire at the enemy.

== Cast ==
- Noël Coward as Captain E. V. Kinross
- Bernard Miles as Chief Petty Officer Walter Hardy
- John Mills as Ordinary Seaman Shorty Blake
- Celia Johnson as Alix Kinross
- Joyce Carey as Kath Hardy
- Kay Walsh as Freda Lewis
- Michael Wilding as Flags
- Derek Elphinstone as No 1
- Leslie Dwyer as Parkinson
- James Donald as Doc
- Philip Friend as Torps
- Frederick Piper as Edgecombe
- Richard Attenborough as Young Stoker (originally uncredited)
- Ballard Berkeley as Chiefy (Commander 'E')
- Kathleen Harrison as Mrs Blake
- George Carney as Mr Blake
- Daniel Massey as Bobby Kinross
- Ann Stephens as Lavinia Kinross
- Walter Fitzgerald as Colonel Lumsden
- Hubert Gregg as Pilot
- Penelope Dudley-Ward as Maureen
- Juliet Mills as Shorty Blake's baby

== Production ==
Shortly after his play Blithe Spirit opened in the West End in July 1941, Noël Coward was approached by Anthony Havelock-Allan, who was working with the production company Two Cities Films. Its founder, Filippo Del Giudice, was interested in making a propaganda film and wanted someone well-known to write the screenplay.

=== Screenplay development ===
Coward agreed to work on the project as long as the subject was the Royal Navy, and he was given complete control.

As the sinking of HMS Kelly on 23 May 1941 was still on Coward's mind, he decided to use the ship's demise as the basis for his script. Mountbatten, aware that there was some public antipathy to his political ambitions, agreed to support the project as long as it was not a conspicuous biography of his own experiences. In order to do research, Coward visited the naval base in Plymouth, where Michael Redgrave, with whom he was in a relationship at the time, was stationed. He also visited Portsmouth and the Home Fleet at Scapa Flow, where he sailed on HMS Nigeria.

Coward spent the final months of 1941 drafting a screenplay. However, when he submitted it to Havelock-Allan, the producer told him the film would run between eight and nine hours if it was made as written because it included lengthy scenes in Paris, China, and the West Indies. Havelock-Allan told Coward he needed to trim the plot down to the basics by eliminating everything that was not related to the Torrin or its crew. Heeding the advice, Coward started his story with the laying of the ship's keel in 1939 and concluded it soon after it sank off the coast of Crete. For the speech at the end of the film, when Capt. Kinross addresses the survivors from the Torrin in Alexandria, Coward used the real speech that Mountbatten gave to the surviving crew of HMS Kelly after they were rescued and taken to Egypt.

=== Pre-production roles ===
Coward was determined to portray Captain Kinross in the film despite the studio's concern that his public "dressing gown and cigarette-holder" persona might make it difficult for audiences to accept him in the role of a tough navy man. Havelock-Allan supported him, although he later called his performance "always interesting, if not quite convincing." Coward also needed to convince the censors that the sinking of the ship was a crucial scene and not the threat to public morale they perceived it to be.

Coward had experience directing plays, but he was a novice when it came to films, and he knew he needed to surround himself with professionals if the project was to succeed. He had seen and admired Ronald Neame's work and he hired him as cinematographer and chief lighting technician. The Italian film director Filippo Del Giudice was released from his internment as an enemy alien to work on the film at Coward's insistence. MI5 supplied Ann Elwell as his secretary. She was translating for him as he took on the role of art director and she also did some scriptwriting. Coward could handle the direction of the actors but would be at a loss with the action scenes, so he asked David Lean to supervise the filming of those. In Which We Serve proved to be the first of several films on which the two would collaborate.

=== Filming ===
Shooting began at Denham Studios on 5 February 1942. From the start, Coward was happy to let production crew members take charge in their areas of expertise while he concentrated on directing the actors and creating his own portrayal of Kinross. However, he soon became bored with the mechanics of filmmaking and after six weeks he came to the studio only when scenes in which he appeared were being filmed. At one point, he invited the royal family to the set and newsreel footage of their visit proved to be good publicity for the film.

During the filming, the character of Albert Fosdike, "Shorty" Blake's brother-in-law, was recast after actor William Hartnell turned up late for his first day of shooting. Coward berated Hartnell in front of cast and crew for his unprofessionalism. He then made him personally apologise to everyone before sacking him. Michael Anderson, the film's first-assistant director, took over the part (credited as "Mickey Anderson").

Coward was anxious that it succeed, not only because it was his first film project, but because he felt it was his contribution to the war effort and he wanted it to be perceived as such by the public. The première was a gala event held as a benefit for several naval charities and Coward was pleased to see a large presence of military personnel.

Richard Attenborough appeared as a sailor deserting his post under fire. His name and character were omitted from the original release-print credits but were subsequently added.

=== Locations ===
Interiors were filmed at Denham Studios, in Denham, Buckinghamshire. The destroyer HMAS Nepal played HMS Torrin. The Kinross family picnic scene, set during the Battle of Britain in 1940, was filmed on location on the Dunstable Downs in Bedfordshire. The pennant number of the ship in the exteriors is F12, which is HMS Kashmir, not Nepal. And as the movie was loosely based on the sinking of her sister, this would be appropriate.

Although the filmmakers took great care to conceal locations because of wartime censorship, scenes were shot at Plymouth's naval dockyard in Devon and the naval station on the Isle of Portland. For example, the departure of Blake and Hardy was filmed in front of Devonport's original main entrance, the Keyham Dock Gate. Smeaton's Tower on the seafront at Plymouth Hoe was used for the shore-leave scenes between Shorty Blake (Mills) and his wife Freda (Kay Walsh).

== Reception ==
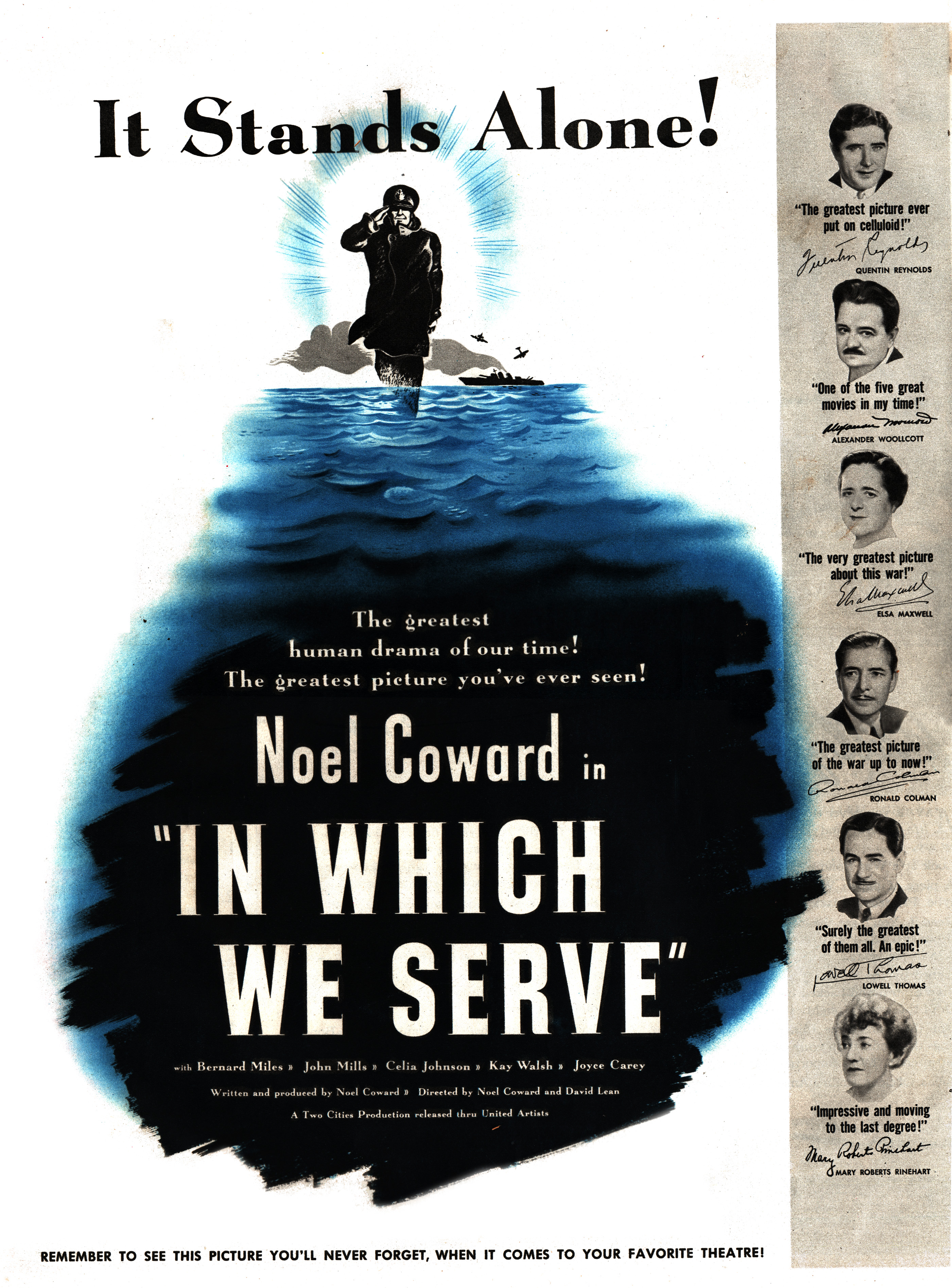
An advertisement for the film in a 1943 edition of the American magazine Look

=== Box office ===
The film was the second most popular movie at the British box office in 1943. (According to Kinematograph Weekly the film was the most popular.)

The film was one of the most successful British films ever released in the US, earning $1.8 million in rentals ($26 million in 2025 dollars).

=== Critics ===
Bosley Crowther of The New York Times observed, "There have been other pictures which have vividly and movingly conveyed in terms of human emotion the cruel realities of this present war. None has yet done it so sharply and so truly as In Which We Serve... For the great thing which Mr. Coward has accomplished in this film is a full and complete expression of national fortitude ... Yes, this is truly a picture in which the British may take a wholesome pride and we may regard as an excellent expression of British strength."

Variety called the film "a grim tale sincerely picturized and splendidly acted throughout" and added, "Only one important factor calls for criticism. It is that all the details are too prolonged. The author-producer-scriptwriter-composer and co-director gives a fine performance as the captain of the vessel, but acting honors also go to the entire company. Stark realism is the keynote of the writing and depiction, with no glossing of the sacrifices constantly being made by the sailors."

=== Naval response ===
Despite largely positive reviews by audiences and critics alike, the film was not well received by some within the Admiralty who dubbed it "In Which We Sink".

=== Awards and nominations ===
On Christmas Eve 1942 in New York the National Board of Review of Motion Pictures honoured the film as the Best English Language Film of the Year, citing Bernard Miles and John Mills for their performances.

The film was nominated in the 1943 Academy Awards for Best Picture and Best Original Screenplay (losing out to Casablanca and Princess O'Rourke respectively). However, Coward was presented with an Academy Honorary Award for "his outstanding production achievement."

In Which We Serve also won the New York Film Critics Circle Award for Best Film (beating Casablanca) and the Argentine Film Critics Association Award for Best Foreign Film in 1943.

== Home media ==
A Region 2 DVD with a running time of 96 minutes was released by Carlton on 11 October 1999. A Region 1 DVD was released as part of the David Lean Collection by MGM on 7 September 2004. It features subtitles in English, Spanish, and French and an English audio track in Dolby Digital 1.0. In March 2012, The Criterion Collection released In Which We Serve on Blu-ray and DVD as part of the 'David Lean Directs Noël Coward' box set, which includes a short documentary on the making of In Which We Serve. Criterion had also released In Which We Serve on laserdisc in 1995.

== See also ==
- BFI Top 100 British films
