= Life of St. Paul =

Series of short films by G.H.W. Productions

- Created by: G.H.W. Productions

Films and television
- Short film(s): On the Road to Damascus; The Way of Salvation; Faith Triumphant; Grace of Forgiveness; Crown of Righteousness

Life of St. Paul is a series of five short films about Paul the Apostle produced by G.H.W. Productions. They were released between 1937 and 1939. They were shot at Pinewood Studios and Nettlefold Studios in England.

The script was written by Margaret Cross, a writer for the Religious Film Society, and the title role was played by Neal Arden. James B. Sloan directed the first and fifth films; Norman Walker directed the second, third and fourth.

== Plot ==
1: On the road to Damascus
Covers the Conversion of Paul

2: Faith triumphant
Paul's imprisonment and trials before Festus and Agrippa

3: Way of Salvation
Covers Acts 16:9-40

4: Grace of Forgiveness
Paul in Rome awaiting trial

5: Crown of Righteousness
Paul's trial before Nero

== Cast ==
- Neal Arden as Paul
- Josephine Wilson as Lydia
- George Hayes as Nero
- Conway Dixon as Epaphroditus
- Clifton Boyne as Linus
- Jack Raine as Pudens
- Ambrose Day as Tigellinus
- Lewis Broughton as Luke
- Allan Jeayes as Burrus
- Whitmore Humphreys as Gaius
- Elliott Seabrooke as Tychicus
- Gregory Stroud as Philemon
- Thorley Walters as Onesimus
- Kaye Seely as Epaphras
- Trefor Jones as Aristarchus
- Gerald Anderson as Timothy
- Charles Oliver as Elder
- Ralph Truman as Orderley
