= Ann Elwell =

British linguist, intelligence officer and diplomat (1922–1996)

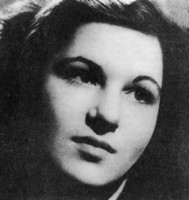
- anonymous photographer and date unknown
- Born: Ann Catherine Glass; 16 June 1922; Bayswater, London, United Kingdom
- Died: 12 January 1996 (aged 73); Westminster, London, United Kingdom
- Education: Miss Faunce's School and Misses Lestrange's finishing school
- Occupations: Intelligence officer and diplomat
- Spouse: Charles Elwell
- Children: 4

Ann Catherine Elwell born Ann Catherine Glass (16 June 1922 – 12 January 1996) was a British linguist, intelligence officer and diplomat.

== Early life ==
Elwell was born in Bayswater in 1922. She was the only child of Dr. Robert and Eileen Smartt Glass. She learnt French and German from a governess whilst attending Miss Faunce's School which was local before going to Misses Lestrange's finishing school in Florence. In Florence she added bookbinding to her skills and Italian to her languages and at some time Spanish.

She was one of the last girls to be Debutantes in 1939.

== Career ==
Elwell joined MI5 at Wormwood Scrubs in May 1940 after being recruited at a party. That October she and MI5 moved to Oxford, where she worked at Blenheim Palace translating Italian and enjoying the social life. In 1941 she was assigned to become the secretary to the Italian film director Filippo del Giudice who had been released to work on the film In Which We Serve. She was translating for him as he took on the role of Art Director for Noël Coward and she did some scriptwriting also. She was in that role until September 1942 when she returned to MI5 in London.

At the end of the war, Elwell was sent to Rome where she spent a year as head of section reading the papers of the Italians. She took over the job from Anthony Blunt. She served in the Information Research Department of the Foreign Office from 1959. This name hid the group's intention, which was to defeat communism.

== Personal life ==
In 1950, Ann married Charles Elwell who also worked for MI5. Joining the RNVR in 1940 to smuggle British agents into occupied territory, he was captured as a prisoner-of-war in Colditz Castle, being released only at the end of the war. He was initially involved during the 1950s and early 1960s with tracking down Soviet espionage activities of the Portland spy ring and John Vassall, for which he was awarded an OBE. He remained preoccupied with "subversives" working in Britain, targeting Labour Party politicians and trades unionists such as Patricia Hewitt, Harriet Harman and Jack Dromey.

The Elwells had two sons and two daughters. On 12 January 1996, she died in Westminster, London, England. In 2008, her husband died.
