= William Mervyn =

English actor (1912–1976)

- Born: William Mervyn Pickwoad; 3 January 1912; Nairobi, British East Africa
- Died: 6 August 1976 (aged 64); London, England
- Occupation: Actor
- Years active: 1947–1976
- Spouse: Anne Margaret Payne-Cook
- Children: 3

William Mervyn Pickwoad (3 January 1912 – 6 August 1976) was an English actor best known for his portrayal of the bishop in the clerical comedy All Gas and Gaiters, the old gentleman in The Railway Children and Inspector Charles Rose in The Odd Man and its sequels.

== Life and career ==
Mervyn was born in Nairobi, British East Africa, but educated in Britain at Forest School, Snaresbrook, before embarking on a stage career, spending five years in provincial theatre. He made his West End debut in The Guinea Pig at the Criterion Theatre in 1946, before parts in plays such as Lend Me Robin at the Embassy Theatre, the comedy Ring Round the Moon, The Mortimer Touch, A Woman of No Importance by Oscar Wilde at the Savoy Theatre in 1953 and Charley's Aunt.

Mervyn's later stage roles included those of O'Trigger in The Rivals, Lord Greenham in the comedy Aren't We All? and Sir Patrick Cullen in The Doctor's Dilemma. Although he was admired in the theatre, it was with television that he became really well known. One of his first major small screen roles was Sir Hector in the 1962 series Saki. Four years later, he played the Bishop of St. Ogg's in the comedy series All Gas and Gaiters. It was, at that time, breaking with tradition, allowing a laugh at the expense of the established church.

He also played the police chief inspector Charles Rose in the Granada TV series The Odd Man and its spin-offs It's Dark Outside and Mr Rose. He played the Hon. Mr. Justice Campbell in the Granada TV series Crown Court.

He was a chief inspector in the 1949 Ealing Studios film The Blue Lamp with a young Dirk Bogarde). He then appeared in a 1960 episode of the spin-off series, Dixon of Dock Green, called "The Hot Seat". He was in the 1966 Doctor Who story The War Machines and several Carry On films in the late 1960s, and also appeared as Mr. Whitty in the Randall and Hopkirk (Deceased) episode "A Disturbing Case" in 1969.

Usually cast as a wealthy upper class gentleman, he also appeared in The Railway Children (1970), as the children's train passenger friend, and The Ruling Class (1972). Around the same time, he appeared as Sir Hector Drummond, Bt., in the British TV series The Rivals of Sherlock Holmes, in an episode entitled "The Superfluous Finger" (1973).

== Personal life ==
Mervyn was married to Anne Margaret Payne-Cook, a theatre designer and architect who survived him with their three sons – Michael Pickwoad, who in 2010 became the production designer on Doctor Who, Richard, television director and aerial cameraman and Nicholas (Pickwoad), expert on bookbinding. Mervyn's granddaughter Amy Pickwoad became an art director and standby art director for Doctor Who.

== Filmography ==
=== Film ===
Year	Title	Role	Notes
1947	The Loves of Joanna Godden	Huxtable	
1947	The Mark of Cain	Mr Bonnington	Uncredited
1949	That Dangerous Age	Nicky	
1949	Stop Press Girl	Cinema Manager	Uncredited
1950	The Blue Lamp	Chief Inspector Hammond	Uncredited
1950	Four Men in Prison	Prison Governor	short
1954	Conflict of Wings	Mr Wentworth	
1956	Tons of Trouble	Roberts (M15)	
1956	The Long Arm	Manager of Festival Hall	
1957	The Admirable Crichton	Guest at Ball	Uncredited
1957	Barnacle Bill	Captain	
1957	The Long Arm	Manager of Festival Hall	Released as The Third Key in the USA
1958	Carve Her Name with Pride	Colonel Buckmaster	
1959	The 39 Steps	Angry Train Passenger	Uncredited
1959	Upstairs and Downstairs	Kingsley	
1960	A Touch of Larceny	Capt. Balfour	Uncredited
1960	The Battle of the Sexes	Detective's friend	
1960	Circus of Horrors	Doctor Morley	
1961	No Love for Johnnie	Postmaster-General	Uncredited
1961	Watch It, Sailor!	Ship's Captain	Uncredited
1961	Invasion Quartet	Naval Officer	
1963	Tamahine	Lord Birchester	
1964	Hot Enough for June	Passenger on plane	Uncredited and released as Agent 8¾ in the USA
1964	Murder Ahoy!	Commander Breeze-Connington	
1965	Operation Crossbow	Dutch Technical Examiner	
1965	Up Jumped a Swagman	Mr Hawkes Fenhoulet	
1967	Deadlier Than the Male	Chairman of the Phoenician Board	
1967	The Jokers	Uncle Edwards	
1967	Follow That Camel	Sir Cyril Ponsonby	
1968	Hammerhead	Walter Perrin	
1968	Salt and Pepper	Prime Minister	
1968	Star!	General	Uncredited
1968	Hot Millions	Sir Charles Wilson	Uncredited
1969	The Best House in London		Uncredited
1969	Carry On Again Doctor	Lord Paragon	
1970	Incense for the Damned	Marc Honeydew	
1970	Atlantic Wall	L'évêque Anglais	
1970	The Railway Children	Old Gentleman	credited as Mr William Mervyn
1971	Carry On Henry	Physician	
1972	The Ruling Class	Sir Charles Gurney	
1972	Up the Front	Lord Twithampton	
1976	The Bawdy Adventures of Tom Jones	Squire Alworthy	

=== Television ===
Year	Title	Role	Notes
1959	Charlesworth	Charles Begbie	
1959	Hancock's Half Hour	Council official	
1960	ITV Television Playhouse	Mr Challen	
1960	The Long Way Home	French police sergeant	
1960	The Four Just Men	Under Secretary	
1960	Yorky	Mr Playford	
1960	On Trial	Sergeant Ballatine/President of the Court	
1960	Biggles	Alan Harding	
1960	Dixon of Dock Green	Bruce Treadgold	
1960	Persuasion	Admiral Croft	
1961	No Hiding Place	Ivor Naunton/Colonel Frew	
1962	Oliver Twist	Mr Grimwig	
1962	Saki	Sir Hector	8 episodes
1962	Bulldog Breed	Company director	
1962	Maigret	Doctor	
1962	It Happened Like This	Sir George Wilby	
1963	The Odd Man	Chief Inspector Rose	
1963	The Sentimental Agent	Colonel Wilde	
1964	Silas Marner	Squire Cass	
1964	Diary of a Young Man	Bott	
1964	The Massingham Affair	Mr Jessopp	
1965	The Flying Swan	Alexander Curtis	
1965	Heiress of Garth	Squire Griffin	TV mini-series
1965	Court Martial	Chief Inspector Haigh	
1966	The Liars	Sir Gerald	
1966	Doctor Who: The War Machines	Sir Charles Summer	
1966	BBC Play of the Month	Sir Hector Rose	
1966–1971	All Gas and Gaiters	Bishop Cuthbert Hever	
1967	Gideon's Way	Mr Pater	
1968–1970	Thirty-Minute Theatre	Sir Eric Brown/Father	
1969	Randall and Hopkirk (Deceased)	Whitty	
1970	The Mating Machine	Major Whitestone	
1971–1972	Tottering Towers	Duke of Tottering	
1972–1984	Crown Court	The Hon. Mr Justice Campbell	
1973	The Rivals of Sherlock Holmes	Sir Hector Drummond	
1976	The Ghosts of Motley Hall	Mr Bayling	
1977	Raffles	Osborne	

== Theatre ==
Year	Title	Theatre	Notes
1946	The Guinea Pig	Criterion Theatre	
1947–1948	The Blind Goddess	Apollo Theatre, London	
1948	Lend Me Robin	Embassy Theatre	
1952	The Mortimer Touch	Duke of York's Theatre	
1952–1953	Pagan in the Parlour	Theatre Royal, Bath	
1953	A Woman of No Importance	Savoy Theatre	
1954	Charley's Aunt	New Theatre and Strand Theatre	
1954–1955	Witness for the Prosecution	Bristol Hippodrome	
1955	Mrs Willie	Globe Theatre, London	
1956	The Rivals	Saville Theatre	
1957	The Iron Duchess	Fortune Theatre	
1972	The Doctor's Dilemma		

== Bibliography ==
- TV Unforgettables – Over 250 Legends of the Small Screen
- Wearing, J.P. (2014). The London Stage 1940 – 1949: A Calendar of Productions, Performers and Personnel. Rowman & Littlefield
- Wearing, J.P. (2014). The London Stage 1950 – 1959: A Calendar of Productions, Performers and Personnel. Rowman & Littlefield
