= Josephine Wilson =

British actress (1904–1990)

The Right Honourable The Lady Miles
- Born: 5 July 1904; Bromley, Kent, England
- Died: 7 November 1990 (aged 86); London, England
- Occupation: Actress
- Years active: 1938–1958
- Spouse: Bernard Miles (m. 1931)
- Children: 3, including John Miles

Josephine Wilson (5 July 1904 – 7 November 1990) was a British stage and film actress. She was the wife of Bernard Miles and creator of the Molecule Club, which staged scientific shows for children at the Mermaid Theatre, a venue her husband had founded.

== Selected filmography ==
=== Film ===
- South Riding (1938) – Mrs. Holly
- The Lady Vanishes (1938) – Madame Kummer
- Life of St. Paul (1938) – Lydia
- The Four Feathers (1939) – Mrs. Brown – Sgt. Brown's wife (uncredited)
- Those Kids from Town (1942) – Mrs. Burns
- Uncensored (1943) – (uncredited)
- We Dive at Dawn (1943) – Alice Hobson (uncredited)
- The Adventures of Tartu (1943) – Nurse (uncredited)
- The Dark Tower (1943) – Dora Shogun
- Quiet Weekend (1946) – Mary Jarrow
- Chance of a Lifetime (1950) – Miss Cooper
- The End of the Affair (1955) – Miss Smythe

=== Television ===
- The Diary of Samuel Pepys (1958) – Lady Sandwich

== Bibliography ==
- Hare, William. Hitchcock and the Methods of Suspense. McFarland, 2007.
