= Pilgrim Pictures =

Two film production companies

Pilgrim Pictures is the name of two production companies, one from the mid 20th century and one from the 21st century.

== 20th century ==
- Damaged Hearts (1924)
- The Guinea Pig (1948)
- Private Angelo (1949)
- Chance of a Lifetime (1950)
- Driven (1994) (TV)

== 21st century ==
- The Pilgrims (2009)
