= Puddle Dock =

Street in Blackfriars in the City of London

Coordinates: 51.511°N 0.102°W

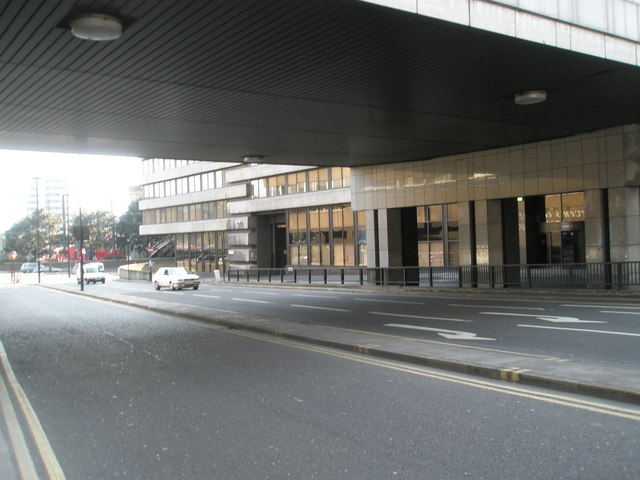
Puddle Dock in 2008

Puddle Dock is a street in Blackfriars in the City of London. It was once the site of one of London's docks, and was later the site of the Mermaid Theatre. The dock was filled in during redevelopment in the 1960s and 1970s.

== As a dock ==
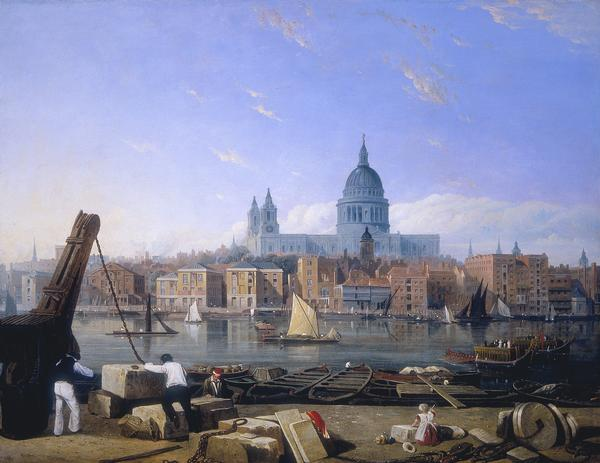
View of docks on the north bank of River Thames, with St Paul's Cathedral behind, in the 1820s. Puddle Dock is situated at the far left.

Berkeley's Inn, the town house of the Barons Berkeley of Berkeley Castle, Gloucestershire, stood nearby, at the south end of Adle Street, against 'Puddle Wharf', as reported in 1598 by John Stow in his Survey of London, at which date the house had been abandoned by the family and had been split up into multiple-occupation apartments, in a dilapidated state. Richard de Beauchamp, 13th Earl of Warwick, son-in-law of Thomas de Berkeley, 5th Baron Berkeley, lodged in this house, in the parish of St. Andrew-by-the-Wardrobe.

In an article on Puddle Dock by Charles White in 1920 he describes it thus: Puddle Dock is situated at the Western extremity of Upper Thames Street, near our Blackfriars station. It is a square opening in the river bank, between two blocks of warehouses, a place where the dark, drift-strewn waters of the Thames flow right up to the streets of the City. Barges still put in here to discharge their cargoes, as they have done for many centuries. It is the smallest of the draw-docks of Thames-street, the quayside of old London and the germ of what is now the greatest of the world's ports.

Charles White notes that in the deed relating to the sale of the remains of nearby Baynard's Castle in 1275, the sale also includes all other things belonging to the said castle, or barony, as well in rents, his ports and putting in of ships. He suggests that this is Puddle Dock, and is the same dock referred to as wharf at Castle Baynard in Liber Albus and other city archives. He points out that the present Castle Baynard wharf in Thames Street dates back no more than 2 centuries or so, and the so-called Castle Baynard that stood there has no connection with the original Castle Baynard built by William the Conqueror. Recent studies tend to support this view with Puddle Dock found to lie "within the south-eastern corner of the outer defences of the Baynard's Castle" according to a 1989 study.

There is an indirect link to Shakespeare, as he gifted in his will a house to his daughter, Susanna Hall, a house described in the conveyance as "abutting upon a streete leading down to Puddle Wharffe on the east part, right against the King's Majesty's Wardrobe ... now or late in the tenure of one William Ireland or of his asignee or assignees."

Puddle Dock suffered a major fire in 1841 causing "utter destruction to the large bonded warehouses and stores belonging to Messrs Smith & Co, corn factors, situated near Puddle Dock". The warehouse facing the Thames was 7 stories high, and "the principal front fell with a tremendous crash into the river, about 5 o'clock in the morning."

Puddle Dock appeared to be one of the outlets for the London sewers before the great Victorian reforms in that area with numerous complaints in the 1830s, and in 1849 an account stated that "in the course of mid-day, not only waggons arrived loaded with putrid filth, but bones in the worst state of decomposition". However Puddle Dock wasn't alone on this and in complaints in 1849 in relation to raw sewage mentions "Puddle Dock, Whitefriars Dock, Broken Dock and other parts of the shores on the Thames within the City, where the contents of the sewers are discharged".

In 1852 Puddle Dock was mentioned all over the country in an advertisement about the application of sewer treatment to the sewer in Puddle Dock from 1849, which it claims permitted " the conversion of the sewage into dry manure, postable in sacks and perfectly inodorous". After then the dock gets very little mention in the newspapers.

In 1872 there was another major fire at the City Flour Mills built on the "Old Puddle Dock". The building is described as "the largest flour mill in the world", and was 250 feet long, 60 feet wide and 8 stories high. It was owned by Messrs J & J Hadley, who had built the premises in 1852 on a vacant piece of land stretching to the riverside, and within it there were steam powered grinding mills as well as a large grain store.

In 1909 it was reported that the wardsmen of Castle Baynard had been petitioning to fill the dock in.

The Mermaid Theatre was opened in 1959 in a bombed out warehouse alongside Puddle Dock, and the dock was still usable after this, with the Thames sailing barge Henry visible in postcards of the theatre from around 1960. The redevelopment of the area was a protracted affair, with Simon Jenkins of the Illustrated London News commenting in 1971, of the "Blight around Blackfriars" with the destruction of the Gothic and renaissance warehouses. He refers to the barge that was in the Puddle Dock "just 10 years" ago alongside the Mermaid Theatre, which is now "an underpass slip-road".

== Later use ==
The area was dramatically altered by major works over a long period of time from in the 1960s and early 1970s, involving the reclaiming of foreshore of the River Thames at Puddle Dock and the rebuilding of Upper Thames Street as a major traffic thoroughfare. Today its name survives as the name of a street connecting Upper Thames Street and Queen Victoria Street.

Puddle Dock formed part of the marathon course of the 2012 Olympic and Paralympic Games.

The nearest London Underground stations are Blackfriars (Circle and District lines) and St Paul's (Central line).
