= Thomas Hemsley =

English baritone

Thomas Jeffrey Hemsley, CBE (12 April 1927 – 11 April 2013) was an English baritone.

Hemsley was born in Coalville, Leicestershire, and attended Ashby de la Zouch Grammar School. He took a degree in natural sciences from Brasenose College, Oxford. He moved to London and became a pupil of Lucie Manén, and also served as a Vicar Choral at St Paul's Cathedral. He made his debut in 1951 as Aeneas in Purcell's Dido and Aeneas at the first Mermaid Theatre, London, alongside Kirsten Flagstad as Dido. The pair recorded the opera for EMI the same year. He debuted at Glyndebourne in 1953. He was principal baritone at the Aachen Opera from 1953 to 1956, the Deutsche Oper am Rhein from 1956 to 1963, and the Zürich Opera from 1962 to 1967.

In 1960, Hemsley created the role of Demetrius in Britten's A Midsummer Night's Dream with the English Opera Group at Aldeburgh. His other work in contemporary opera included his Covent Garden debut in 1970 as Mangus in Tippett's The Knot Garden, Iain Hamilton's opera The Catiline Conspiracy in 1974 at Scottish Opera as Caesar, and the role of Rev Wringhim in Thomas Wilson's opera The Confessions of a Justified Sinner (1976). In 1965, he was the baritone soloist in only the second UK performance (and only the fourth performance in the work's history) of Delius's Requiem, in Liverpool, with the Royal Liverpool Philharmonic Orchestra under Charles Groves.

Hemsley was a notable interpreter of German music, such as Beckmesser in Wagner's Die Meistersinger von Nürnberg. Otto Klemperer specifically recommended Hemsley to the Bayreuth Festival for the role, which Hemsley sang there 1968 to 1970 and recording it under the baton of Rafael Kubelík. In the latter part of his career, he taught at the Guildhall School of Music and Drama, London and also Dartington International Summer School.

Hemsley married Gwenllian James in 1960, and the couple had 3 sons. His widow and sons survive him.

== Sources ==
- Thomas Hemsley at IMDb
- Guildhall School of Music and Drama website
