= Norman Wooland =

British character actor (1905–1989)

Cyril Norman Wooland
- Born: 16 March 1905; Düsseldorf, German Empire
- Died: 3 April 1989 (aged 84); Staplehurst, Kent, England
- Years active: 1936–1985

Norman Wooland (16 March 1905 – 3 April 1989) was an English character actor who appeared in many major films, including several Shakespearean adaptations.

Wooland was born in Düsseldorf, Germany, to British parents. During the Second World War, he was a junior radio announcer, reporting the news for the BBC. His acting break came when he played Horatio in Laurence Olivier's Hamlet (1948), and in which his "fine work" was noted by The New York Times. Then came Catesby in Olivier's film of Richard III, and Paris in Romeo and Juliet (1954). He starred as King Saul in Saul and David (1964). He also had supporting roles in Quo Vadis (1951), Ivanhoe (1952), Background (1953), The Guns of Navarone (1961), Life for Ruth (1962) and International Velvet (1978).

Cyril Norman Wooland married Evelyn T.P.M. Charpentier in 1932 and they had two daughters. He married Kathleen M. Smith in 1947.

He was godfather to the daughter of legendary radio producer and director Raymond Raikes who he worked with regularly and who was a lifelong friend, having both been radio announcers during the Second World War for the BBC Radio service.

Wooland kept a herd of cows, each of which was named after a Shakespearean character. He died in 1989, at the age of 84.

== Filmography ==
- The Five Pound Man (1937) as Lodge Keeper
- This England (1941) as (uncredited)
- Escape (1948) as Minister
- Hamlet (1948) as The Royal Court of Denmark – Horatio, his friend
- Look Before You Love (1948) as Ashley Morehouse
- All Over the Town (1949) as Nat Hearn
- Madeleine (1950) as William Minnoch
- The Angel with the Trumpet (1951) as Prince Rudolf
- Quo Vadis (1951) as Nerva
- The City of London as Commentator (British Pathé, film ID. no.:1375.03
- Ivanhoe (1952) as King Richard
- The Ringer (1952) as Inspector Bliss
- Background (1953) as Bill Ogden
- The Master Plan (1954) as Col. Mark Cleaver
- Romeo and Juliet (1954) as Paris
- Richard III (1955) as Catseby
- Je plaide non coupable (1956) as Pelton
- My Teenage Daughter (1956) as Hugh Manning
- No Road Back (1957) as Insp. Harris
- The Flesh Is Weak (1957) as Inspector Kingcombe
- The Bandit of Zhobe (1959) as Maj. Crowley
- The Rough and the Smooth (1960) as David Fraser
- Night Train for Inverness (1960) as Roy Lewis
- An Honourable Murder (1960) as Brutus Smith
- The Guns of Navarone (1961) as Group Captain
- Barabbas (1961) as Rufio
- Masters of Venus (1962) as Dr. Ballantyne
- Life for Ruth (1962) as Counsel for the Crown
- The Fall of the Roman Empire (1964) as Virgilianus
- Saul and David (1964) as King Saul
- The Projected Man (1966) as Dr. L. G. Blanchard
- The Fighting Prince of Donegal (1966) as Sir John Perrott
- International Velvet (1978) as Team Doctor
- The Mirror Crack'd (1980) as Medical Examiner (uncredited)
