= Bernard Miles =

English actor, writer, and director (1907–1991)

The Right Honourable The Lord Miles CBE
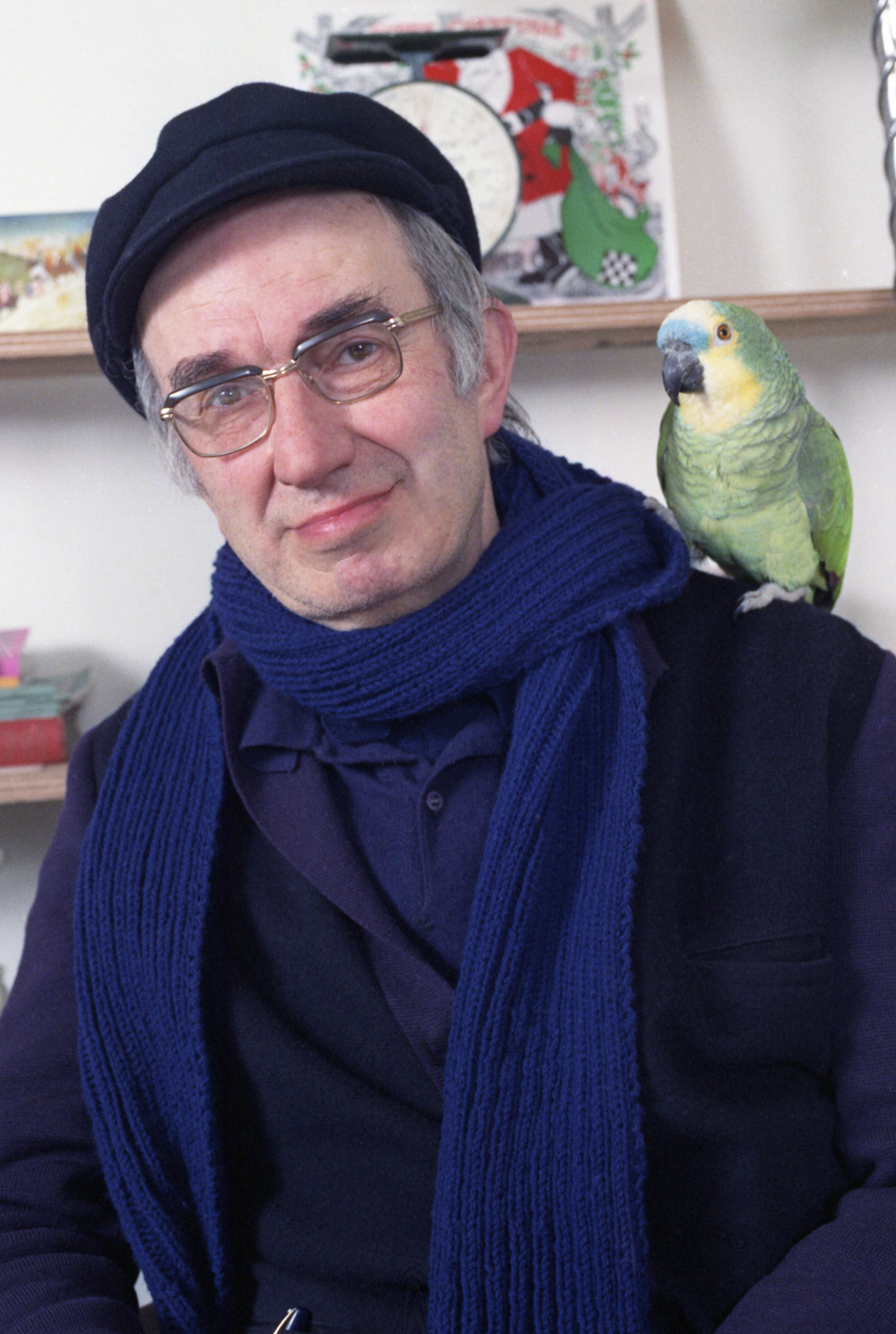
- Bernard Miles in 1974 (with his parrot, Jack Sprat) by Allan Warren

Member of the House of Lords Lord Temporal
- In office 7 February 1979 – 14 June 1991; Life peerage

Personal details
- Born: Bernard James Miles; 27 September 1907 Uxbridge, Middlesex, England
- Died: 14 June 1991 (aged 83) Knaresborough, North Yorkshire, England
- Spouse: Josephine Wilson (m. 1931; died 1990)
- Children: 3, including John Miles

Bernard James Miles, Baron Miles (27 September 1907 – 14 June 1991) was an English character actor, writer and director. He opened the Mermaid Theatre in 1959, the first new theatre that opened in the City of London since the 17th century.

He was known for playing character roles that had bucolic backgrounds or links to countrymen. His strong accent was typical of rustic dialects associated with the counties of Hertfordshire and Buckinghamshire. His pleasant rolling bass-baritone voice made him a regular presence on the stage and in films for more than fifty years. In addition to his acting, he was a voice-over artist and published author.

== Early life ==
Miles was educated at Uxbridge County School, Pembroke College, Oxford, and the Northampton Institute (later City University of London) in London. He lived for a while in New Road, Hillingdon Heath.

== Career ==
In 1946 his comedy about the Home Guard Let Tyrants Tremble! was staged at the Scala Theatre in the West End, with Miles in the cast.

By the 1950s, he had started to work in television. In 1951 he played Long John Silver in a British TV version of Treasure Island. A decade later he reprised the role for a performance of Treasure Island at the Mermaid Theatre in the winter of 1961–62, where the cast included Spike Milligan as Ben Gunn.

Miles was always keen to promote up-and-coming talent. Impressed with the writing of English playwright John Antrobus, he introduced him to Spike Milligan, which led to the production of the one-act play The Bed Sitting Room. It was later expanded and staged by Miles at Mermaid Theatre on 31 January 1963, with critical and commercial success.

Miles was also known for his comic monologues, often delivered with a rural dialect, which were issued on record albums.

== Personal life ==
Miles married the actress Josephine Wilson, with whom he had two daughters and one son, the racing driver John Miles, in 1931. She co-founded and was involved actively with Miles in the Mermaid Theatre, initially at their home Duff House, St John's Wood. She predeceased him on 7 November 1990.

Miles was appointed a Commander of the Order of the British Empire (CBE) in the 1953 New Year Honours, was knighted in the 1969 Birthday Honours, and was created a life peer as Baron Miles, of Blackfriars in the City of London, on 7 February 1979. He was only the second British actor to receive a peerage, after Laurence Olivier.

== Death ==
Miles survived his wife by six months and died in June 1991.

== Filmography ==
=== Film ===
- Channel Crossing (1933) – Passenger (uncredited)
- The Love Test (1935) – Allan
- The Guv'nor (1935) – Man at Meeting (uncredited)
- Late Extra (1935) – Charlie (uncredited)
- Twelve Good Men (1936) – Inspector Pine
- Everything Is Thunder (1936) – British Officer (uncredited)
- Crown v. Stevens (1936) – Detective Wells (uncredited)
- Midnight at Madame Tussaud's (1936) – Modeller (Kelvin) (uncredited)
- Strange Boarders (1938) – Chemist (uncredited)
- The Challenge (1938) – Villager (uncredited)
- Convict 99 (1938) – Prison Warder (uncredited)
- 13 Men and a Gun (1938) – Schultz
- The Citadel (1938) – Member of Medical Aid Society Committee (uncredited)
- They Drive by Night (1938) – Detective at Billiard Hall (uncredited)
- The Rebel Son (1938) – Polish Prisoner
- The Spy in Black (1939) – Hans – Hotel Receptionist (uncredited)
- The Lion Has Wings (1939) – Civilian Observer Controller
- Band Waggon (1940) – Saboteur (uncredited)
- Contraband (1940) – Man Lighting Pipe (uncredited)
- Pastor Hall (1940) – Heinrich Degan
- Freedom Radio (1941) – Capt. Muller
- Quiet Wedding (1941) – PC
- The Common Touch (1941) – Cricket Steward
- The Big Blockade (1942) – Royal Navy: Mate
- This Was Paris (1942) – Nazi Propaganda Officer
- One of Our Aircraft Is Missing (1942) – Geoff Hickman – Front Gunner in B for Bertie
- The Day Will Dawn (1942) – McAllister (Irish Soldier)
- The First of the Few (1942) – Lady Houston's Agent (uncredited)
- In Which We Serve (1942) – Chief Petty Officer Walter Hardy
- The New Lot (1943) – Ted Loman (uncredited)
- Tunisian Victory (1944) – British soldier (voice)
- Tawny Pipit (1944) – Colonel Barton-Barrington
- Carnival (1946) – Trewhella
- Great Expectations (1946) – Joe Gargery
- Nicholas Nickleby (1947) – Newman Noggs
- Fame Is the Spur (1947) – Tom Hannaway
- The Guinea Pig (1948) – Mr. Read
- Chance of a Lifetime (1950) – Stevens
- The Magic Box (1951) – Cousin Alfred
- Never Let Me Go (1953) – Joe Brooks
- The Man Who Knew Too Much (1956) – Edward Drayton
- Moby Dick (1956) – The Manxman
- Tiger in the Smoke (1956) – Tiddy Doll the Gang Leader
- Fortune Is a Woman (1957) – Mr. Jerome
- Doctor at Large (1957) – Haymaking Farmer (uncredited)
- The Smallest Show on Earth (1957) – Old Tom
- Saint Joan (1957) – Master Executioner
- Tom Thumb (1958) – Jonathan
- Sapphire (1959) – Ted Harris
- Heavens Above! (1963) – Simpson
- Baby Love (1968) – (voice)
- Run Wild, Run Free (1969) – Reg
- The Lady and the Highwayman (1989, TV Movie) – Judge

=== Television ===
- Nathaniel Titlark (1956–1957, Woodsman, 10 Episodes, BBCTV. Lost) (with Maureen Pryor as Jessie Titlark) – Nathaniel Titlark
- Long-running ITV commercial advertisement (1960s) Himself, drinking and recommending Mackeson Stout as a beverage that 'Looks good, tastes good and, by golly, does you good'. Popularly believed to have been the main financial support for the Mermaid Theatre, for many years.
- Barbara Hepworth (1961, BBC TV documentary) - Narrator

=== Publications ===
- The British Theatre
- God's Brainwave
- Favourite Tales from Shakespeare
