= Warren Chetham-Strode =

British writer (1896–1974)

Warren Chetnam-Strode MC
- Born: 28 January 1896; Henley
- Died: 26 April 1974 (aged 78); Playden, East Sussex
- Occupations: Author; playwright
- Years active: 1935–1974
- Spouse: Moira Verschoyle
- Children: 1

Reginald Warren Chetham-Strode, MC (28 January 1896 – 26 April 1974) was an English author and playwright. He wrote several plays, including the West End hit The Guinea Pig (1946), which was turned into a film in 1948. He also wrote screenplays for several films between 1935 and 1951, including Odette (1950).

== Early life ==
He was educated at Sherborne School. During World War I, he was commissioned into the Border Regiment. As a lieutenant, he was awarded the Military Cross in 1916. His elder brother Edward Randall Chetham-Strode was killed in action in 1917.

== Career ==
He wrote his first play, Abdul the Dammed, in 1935. He later wrote the BBC Radio series The Barlowes of Beddington, which ran from 1955 to 1959. 'The story of a public school seen through the eyes of a Headmaster and his Wife'. Patrick Barr played Robert Barlowe the headmaster and Pauline Jameson, Kate, his wife. Evans, the Head Boy, was Edward Hardwicke, John Charlesworth was Finlay, Barry McGregor was Shepherd and boys in the background were pupils from Barking Abbey School. Geoffrey Wincott played Dogget, the School Porter and Anthony Shaw was the Governor, General Naseby.

== Personal life ==
He was married on 16 July 1927 to the writer Moira Verschoyle, with whom he had one son, Michael Edward Chetham-Strode.

== Selected plays ==
- Heart's Content (1936)
- The Day is Gone (1938)
- Young Mrs. Barrington (1945)
- The Guinea Pig (1946)
- The Gleam (1946)
- Background (1950)
- The Stepmother (1958)
