= Pauline Jameson =

English actress (1920–2007)

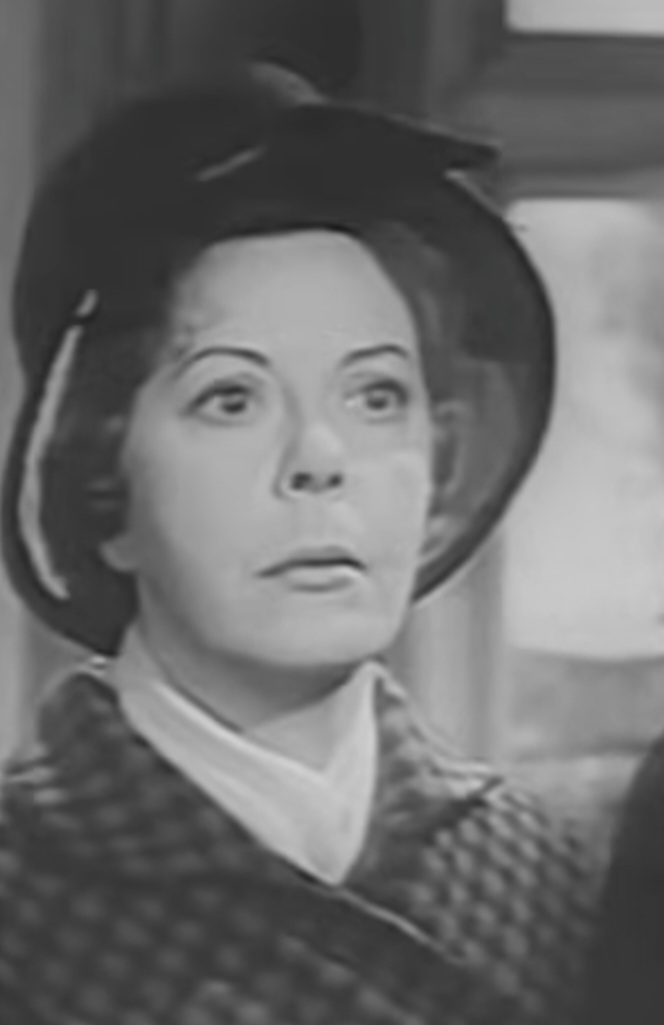
- Jameson in an episode of One Step Beyond (1960)
- Born: Pauline Isobel Jameson; 5 June 1920; Heacham, Norfolk, England
- Died: 8 April 2007 (aged 86); Northwood, Middlesex, England
- Occupation: Actress

Pauline Jameson (5 June 1920 – 8 April 2007) was an English actress whose work encompassed stage and screen. The Times called her "one of the most distinguished classical actresses of her generation".

== Life and career ==
=== Early years ===
Pauline Isobel Jameson was born in Heacham, Norfolk on 5 June 1920, the daughter of Eric Storrs Jameson and his wife Flora Isobel, née Reed. She took ballet lessons, but through her interest in mime she found herself drawn to acting. She studied at the Royal Academy of Dramatic Art and made her professional début in weekly rep at Colwyn Bay in 1937. She first appeared in London at the Q Theatre as Beatrice in Aimée Stuart's London, W.1. and made her West End debut as Lucy in The Rivals at the Criterion Theatre in 1945. After two further West End roles she joined the Old Vic Company at the New Theatre for the 1948–49 season, playing Valeria in Coriolanus, Bianca in The Taming of the Shrew, Maria in Twelfth Night, Covetousness in Doctor Faustus, Mrs Marwood in The Way of the World and Dunyasha in The Cherry Orchard. At the Theatre Royal Haymarket she played Maria in The Heiress, from February until August 1949 and then succeeded Peggy Ashcroft as Catherine Sloper in the same play.

=== 1950s ===
When the Old Vic company returned to its home – rebuilt after wartime bombing – in 1950 she again played Maria in Twelfth Night, and later in the season appeared as Grace Wellborn in Bartholomew Fair, Alice in Henry V and Chrysothemis in Electra. At the Arts Theatre in June 1952 Jameson played Maggie Hobson in Hobson's Choice, after which she joined the Bristol Old Vic company, where her roles included Lady India in Ring Round the Moon, Mariana in Measure for Measure, Kate Hardcastle in She Stoops to Conquer, and Doll Common in The Alchemist. Her roles over the next five years included Mrs Fainall in The Way of the World and Varya in The Cherry Orchard, both at the Lyric Theatre, Hammersmith, the title role in a revival of Penelope at the Arts, Therese in Hippo Dancing on tour, and Mistress Page in The Merry Wives of Windsor at the Stratford Festival, Ontario.

In May 1958 Jameson married Wing Commander Leslie Lewington at St Columba's Church, London. Returning to the Old Vic in 1959, she played the Wife in Sganarelle, Elmire in Tartuffe, and Agatha Posket in The Magistrate opposite Michael Horden. Her last role in the 1950s was at the Queen's Theatre in August 1959 as Mrs Prest in The Aspen Papers, for which she received the Clarence Derwent Award.

=== 1960s and 1970s ===
In July 1962 Jameson played Livia in the Royal Shakespeare Company (RSC) production of Women Beware Women, and after appearing alongside Michael Redgrave in Arthur Watkyn's comedy Out of Bounds she returned to the RSC in January 1964. To mark the Shakespeare quatercentenary the British Council sponsored the company, which included Julie Christie, Alec McCowen, Ian Richardson, Diana Rigg, Paul Scofield and Michael Williams, for a 16-week tour of Europe, the US and Canada. Jameson played the Abbess in The Comedy of Errors and Regan in King Lear. On the tour she made her first appearance in New York, at the State Theatre in May 1964, in both plays.

At the Hampstead Theatre Club in October1964, Jameson played Miss Moffat in a revival of The Corn is Green. At the Aldwych Theatre in May 1966 she played Eleonora in the RSC's production of Tango. In September 1967 she succeeded Vanessa Redgrave in the title role of The Prime of Miss Jean Brodie at Wyndham's Theatre. Her other roles in the 1960s were Mrs Allenby in A Woman of No Importance, Lavinia in The Cocktail Party and Mrs Antrobus in The Skin of Our Teeth.

In the early 1970s her roles included Mrs Darling in Peter Pan and Martha Culver in The Constant Wife. In the mid-1970s she joined the Prospect Theatre Company, together with Dorothy Tutin, Timothy West and Derek Jacobi, in plays including A Month in the Country and A Room With a View. In 1977 she starred with Paul Daneman and Hayley Mills in a production of Rebecca at the Royal Alexandra Theatre, Toronto. In 1979 she appeared with Edward Fox and Avril Elgar in The Family Reunion as the matriarchal dowager, Amy.

=== Later years ===
In 1981 Jameson appeared in a stage adaptation of Agatha Christie's Cards on the Table, which toured before opening in the West End. During the 1980s her roles included Lady Bracknell in The Importance of Being Earnest. The Stage commented:

Pauline Jameson was a suitably severe Lady Bracknell – her class-conscious cross-examination of her daughter's suitor was a comic delight. The commanding pitch of her voice and deftly despatched gems of social prejudice ring in the ears long after the laughter fades.

In 1987, when An Inspector Calls was revived in London, Jameson played Sybil Birling. Her final stage appearance was in 1991 at the Almeida Theatre, playing Charmion to Rigg's Cleopatra in All For Love.

Jameson retired to Denville Hall, and died on 8 April 2007.

== Cinema and television ==
Jameson made her film debut in Esther Waters in 1948, and throughout her lengthy career made many appearances on screen, mainly on television. Her TV credits include: One Step Beyond, Armchair Theatre, No Hiding Place, ITV Play of the Week, Emergency Ward 10, Callan, Public Eye, Play of the Month, The Spoils of Poynton, The Woman in White, Hadleigh, Lillie and Poirot.

- Esther Waters (1948) - Hospital Nurse (as Pauline Jamieson)
- Once a Jolly Swagman (1949) - Mrs Lewis
- The Queen of Spades (1949) - Anyutka
- The Black Knight (1954) - Lady Yeonil
- The Millionairess (1960) - Muriel
- Two Living, One Dead (1961) - Miss Larsen
- Crooks Anonymous (1962) - Sister Prunella
- I Could Go On Singing (1963) - Miss Plimpton
- The Punch and Judy Man (1963) - Mayoress
- Doctor in Distress (1963) - Ward sister
- Murder Most Foul (1964) - Maureen Summers
- Sky West and Crooked (1966) - Mrs. Moss
- Night Watch (1973) - Secretary
- Joseph Andrews (1977) - Lady Tittle
- Full Circle (1977) - Claudia Branscombe
- Agatha Christie's Poirot (1996) - Isabel Tripp

== Sources ==
- Herbert, Ian, ed. (1977). Who's Who in the Theatre (sixteenth ed.). London and Detroit: Pitman Publishing and Gale Research. ISBN 978-0-273-00163-8.
