= Black Record: Germans Past and Present =

Book by Robert Vansittart about Nazi Germany

Black Record: Germans Past and Present is a 1941 book by senior British diplomat Robert Vansittart that was the origin of the term Vansittartism. In addition to selling a half-million copies, Black Record was presented by Vansittart in a series of seven broadcasts by the BBC World Service.

The book's central argument is the assertion that Nazi Germany represented a continuation, not an exception, of German history, which was, since at least the time of the 17th century Prussian kings, characterized by "training in militarism" that sought "inevitable expansion in Europe and then world-domination."

Public reaction to the book varied widely.

== Background ==
Black Record: Germans Past and Present was inspired by Vansittart's experiences with Germany both as a schoolboy and British diplomat. As Permanent Under-Secretary of State for Foreign Affairs (1930-1938) Vansittart was portrayed by many of his diplomatic peers as having an "irrational suspicion and hatred" of Nazi Germany. During his tenure as Permanent Under-Secretary, Vansittart collaborated with French Foreign Minister Pierre Laval to promote the proposed Hoare–Laval Pact, which was an effort to halt Nazi Germany's expansionist ambitions in Austria that ultimately culminated in the Anschluss. Vansittart saw Adolf Hitler's ascension to Chancellor of Germany as a significant threat to both Great Britain and France. Vansittart's worries about Hitler sparked his concerns over Germany's rearmament and its desire for vengeance due to the severe territorial and monetary concessions imposed by the Treaty of Versailles. Suspicious of Hitler, Vansittart used his position as Permanent Under-Secretary to gather secret intelligence to prove Nazi Germany's aggressive militaristic desires to British prime minister Neville Chamberlain. Vansittart's passionate desire to prove Nazi Germany's planned future aggression during the 1938 Munich Agreement led foreign secretary Anthony Eden and Chamberlain to remove him as Permanent Under-Secretary of State and transfer him to the "more prestigious but meaningless job" of Chief Diplomatic Adviser.

== Synopsis ==
Black Record: Germans Past and Present is a harsh critique of German society and culture, portraying them as inherently militaristic and expansionist. In Black Record, Vansittart musters both historical and anecdotal evidence. In the introduction, he says Germany caused "five wars and four misses" in the last seventy-five years. The five wars were the Second Schleswig War (1864), the Austro-Prussian War (1866), the Franco-Prussian War (1870-1871), World War I (1914-1918), and World War II (1939-1945). The four near misses were the Moroccan Crisis (1905-1906, 1911), the Balkan Wars (1912-1913), the Sudetenland Crisis (1938), and the Spanish Civil War (1936-1939). Vansittart makes three core assertions about Germany. The first is that his argument is based on factual observations regarding Germany's behaviour towards its neighbours. The second maintains that while not all Germans are inherently bad, the detrimental Germans outweigh the virtuous ones: "the good exist, but ... they have hitherto not been numerous enough to turn the scale." The third is that Germans showcase a prioritization of military efficiency over humanitarian considerations, as evidenced by the 1902 German war manual Kriegsbrauch im Landkriege. As a recurring metaphor depicting Germany's vices, Vansittart employs the image of a butcherbird. He explains that the butcherbird epitomizes German nature: "it is an animal which looks harmless enough to deceive its neighbours, but which is continually springing on them when they least suspect it, and butchering them." As historical evidence, Vansittart invokes Germany's deceitfulness (e.g. the 1870 Ems Dispatch) and expansionist ambitions (e.g. Lebensraum) as repetitive themes. Vansittart draws a parallel by comparing how Frederick the Great of Prussia and Catherine the Great of Russia partitioned Poland in what is now known as the Second Partition of Poland in the 1790s, to Adolf Hitler's division of Poland with Joseph Stalin in what was later revealed to be a secret addendum to the Molotov-Ribbentrop Pact. For anecdotal evidence, Vansittart describes an instance where he visited Germany as a child to participate in a tennis tournament. He states that during the match his opponent, a German boy, felt disrespected and challenged him to a duel with either a sword or pistol.

== Public reception ==
=== World War II ===
The general public's reception of Black Record: Germans Past and Present was mixed, with its peak support observed during the war years 1941-1945. For example, during a session in the British House of Parliament in 1941, Members of Parliament Ellis Smith and Henry Strauss commended Vansittart's arguments in this book, asserting that atrocities committed by Nazi Germany validated the truth behind Vansittartism. Despite its significant public support, particularly among the Allies of World War II, Black Record: Germans Past and Present faced criticism from various quarters. Notably, Heinrich Fraenkel and Victor Gollancz were among the critics who published books denouncing Black Record for its perceived overgeneralizations and fallacies regarding German history.

=== Post-World War II ===
During the Cold War era, Black Record: Germans Past and Present, along with the broader concept of Vansittartism, garnered attention in discussions concerning West Germany's proposed rearmament and Western democratization. In an early postwar text Willy Brandt, who later became the first chancellor of West Germany from the Social Democratic Party, acknowledged Vansittart's arguments as "worthy of more serious attention" in the context of Fascism acquiring "its strongest and most dangerous exponents in Germany." Brandt's perspective was echoed in debates within the British House of Lords regarding re-education policies in the British-occupied territories of West Germany. Although Vansittartism played a role in the early formulation of the Allied programme of re-education in western Germany, ultimately, driven by concerns over the Soviet Union and communism, Vansittart himself supported an Allied occupation policy that "encouraged all German aspirations or attempts at self-government." In contrast, Soviet social scientist Pyotr N. Fedoseyev published an article in 1962 referencing Vansittart's Black Record: Germans Past and Present, asserting that Vansittartism amounted to a "race-theory intertwined with British and American imperialism." Fedoseyev further argued that the concept of Vansittartism stemmed from a "capitalist mindset" aimed at obscuring the "Marxist-Leninist explanations of the true causes of warfare."
