= Herbert Lomas (actor) =

English actor (1887–1961)

- in The Ghost Train (1941)
- Born: 17 January 1887; Burnley, Lancashire, England
- Died: 12 April 1961 (aged 74); Bovey Tracey, Devon, England
- Years active: 1931–57

Herbert Lomas (17 January 1887 – 12 April 1961) was a British actor who appeared in more than forty films in a career lasting between 1931 and 1955. He was born in Burnley, Lancashire and made his first film appearance in an early sound version of Hobson's Choice (1931).

His stage roles include Ian Hay's The Frog (1936), Emlyn Williams' The Wind of Heaven (1945), J.B. Priestley's Summer Day's Dream (1949) and Wynyard Browne's The Holly and the Ivy (1950)

== Partial filmography ==
- Hobson's Choice (1931) - Jim Heeler
- Many Waters (1931) - Everett
- Frail Women (1932) - The Solicitor
- The Missing Rembrandt (1932) - Manning (uncredited)
- The Sign of Four (1932) - Major Sholto
- When London Sleeps (1932) - Pollard
- The Other Mrs. Phipps (1932, Short) - Minor Role
- Perfect Understanding (1933) - Bradley - Nick's Counsel
- Daughters of Today (1933) - Lincoln
- The Pointing Finger (1933) - Doctor (uncredited)
- The Man from Toronto (1933) - Jake
- Java Head (1934) - Barzil Dunsack
- Lorna Doone (1934) - Sir Ensor Doone
- Fighting Stock (1935) - Murlow
- The Phantom Light (1935) - Claff Owen
- The Ghost Goes West (1935) - Fergus
- The Black Mask (1935) - Sir John McTavish
- Fame (1936) - Rumbold Wakefield
- Rembrandt (1936) - Gerrit van Rijn - Rembrandt's Father
- Fire Over England (1937) - Minor Role (uncredited)
- Knight Without Armour (1937) - Vladinoff
- South Riding (1938) - Castle
- Glorious Morning (1938, TV Movie)
- Over The Moon (1939) - Ladbrooke
- Q Planes (1939) - Mattie - Fisherman (uncredited)
- Ask a Policeman (1939) - Coastguard
- Jamaica Inn (1939) - Dowland - Sir Humphrey's Tenant
- The Lion Has Wings (1939) - Holveg
- Inquest (1939) - Thomas Knight, Coroner
- The Ghost Train (1941) - Saul Hodgkin
- South American George (1941) - Mr. Butters
- Penn of Pennsylvania (1942) - Cockle
- They Met in the Dark (1943) - Van Driver
- Welcome, Mr. Washington (1944) - Blacksmith (uncredited)
- I Know Where I'm Going! (1945) - Mr. Campbell
- The Man Within (1947) - Farmer
- Master of Bankdam (1947) - Tom France
- Bonnie Prince Charlie (1948) - Kinloch Moidart
- The Guinea Pig (1948) - Sir James Corfield
- The Magic Box (1951) - Warehouse Manager
- The Net (1953) - George Jackson
