= The Moonraker =

1958 film by David MacDonald

- British cinema poster
- Directed by: David MacDonald
- Written by: Robert Hall; Wilfred Eades; Alistair Bell
- Based on: The Moonraker by Arthur Watkyn
- Produced by: Hamilton G. Inglis
- Starring: George Baker; Sylvia Syms; Marius Goring
- Cinematography: Mutz Greenbaum
- Edited by: Richard Best
- Music by: Laurie Johnson
- Production company: Associated British Picture Corporation
- Distributed by: Associated British-Pathé
- Release date: 22 May 1958
- Running time: 82 minutes
- Country: United Kingdom
- Language: English

The Moonraker is a 1958 British swashbuckler film directed by David MacDonald and starring George Baker, Sylvia Syms, Marius Goring, Gary Raymond, Peter Arne, John Le Mesurier and Patrick Troughton. It was based on the 1952 play of the same title by Arthur Watkyn. It was released in 1958.

The film depicts a fictionalised account of the escape of Charles II, arranged by the Earl of Dawlish, who leads a double life as a roundhead-baiting highwayman called The Moonraker.

== Synopsis ==
After the Battle of Worcester at the end of the Second English Civil War, the main aim of General Oliver Cromwell is to capture Charles Stuart, son of the executed Charles I. However, the dashing Royalist hero nicknamed The Moonraker prepares to smuggle him to safety into France, under the noses of Cromwell's soldiers. According to the story, the hero is named after the smuggler term, moonrakers, who were reputed to hide contraband in the village pond and to rake it out by moonlight.

== Cast ==
- George Baker as the Moonraker, otherwise Anthony, Earl of Dawlish
- Sylvia Syms as Anne Wyndham
- Marius Goring as Colonel Beaumont
- Peter Arne as Edmund Tyler
- Clive Morton as Lord Harcourt
- Gary Raymond as Charles Stuart
- Richard Leech as Henry Strangeways
- Iris Russell as Judith Strangeways
- Michael Anderson Jr. as Martin Strangeways
- Paul Whitsun-Jones as Parfitt
- John Le Mesurier as Oliver Cromwell
- Patrick Troughton as Captain Wilcox
- Julian Somers as Captain Foster
- Sylvia Bidmead as Meg
- Patrick Waddington as Lord Dorset
- Fanny Rowe as Lady Dorset
- Jennifer Browne as Henrietta Dorset
- Richard Warner as Trooper
- George Woodbridge as Captain Lowry
- Victor Brooks as blacksmith

== Production ==
The film was based on the 1952 play by Arthur Watkyn.

In February 1952 Robert Clark of Associated British proposed that his company purchase the film rights as a vehicle for Audrey Hepburn, whom they had under contract, and either David Niven or Cornel Wilde. Associated British had an arrangement with Warner Bros; Jack Warner liked the story and agreed to a co production starring Hepburn and Wilde.

The play had been very successful in the provinces, so Watkyn wanted £10,000 for the film rights; neither Clark nor Warner would pay this, so Watkyn refused to sell until the play opened in London. When it did, it was a box office disaster and lasted only four performances. Watkyn agreed to sell the rights. However the film was not made with Hepburn.

The film was made several years later. It was one of the last films Clark green-lit while head of the company and he is credited as "director of production". According to one writer,

this was an unusual occurrence for Clark, and indicates his intense interest in the project. And indeed The Moonraker should be interpreted as Clark's 'last stand' on politics and film culture. Rather than display a preference for the attractive and swashbuckling Cavaliers (as is so often evident in British popular culture), Clark's film takes care to establish the moral superiority of the Roundheads. Its soldiery are on the whole presented as moral men convinced of the probity of their cause, and Cromwell (John Le Mesurier) is a dignified and balanced leader. Clark clearly favoured an interpretation of history which presented Puritanism as more sober and even-handed than its alternative.

The film was shot at Elstree Studios, Boreham Wood with sets designed by the art director Robert Jones, with location filming in Dorset, Wiltshire and Hertfordshire. The castle was Leeds Castle in Kent.

Sylvia Syms and Peter Arne were under long-term contract to ABPC at the time.

George Baker said he "enjoyed making The Moonraker very much" adding:

I actually wrote quite a lot of it. A couple of the love scenes with Sylvia were entirely my work ... The film is always popular on television. David Macdonald, who directed it, was unfortunately a bit of a lush, and it was almost his last film. When we got the script he went through it with us, saying, "Here you don't 'walk' across the room — you either 'jump' or 'swing' across but you don't 'walk'. And this twelve lines of dialogue is absolutely useless, we can cut it down to a few words." He did this all the way through, so it's absolutely an action film.

Sylvia Syms called the film

for its time it's quite sweet ... compared with some of the costume dramas coming out of Hollywood at that time, at least we looked right for the period. I had correct hair styling, covered with the modest lace cap, and the costumes were authentic. I liked working with George Baker ... And, of course, Max Greene always made me look beautiful.

The film was one of the last productions made by the Robert Clarke regime at Associated British-Pathe.

== Reception ==
=== Critical ===
The Monthly Film Bulletin said that "on its chosen level, which is that of boys' romantic yarn, this film may be said to succeed. It moves at such a breathless rate that many of its probabilities go unremarked."

Variety called it "a routine costume meller."

Filmink said the film "has too many cast members who look like George Baker but is quite lovely with terrific colour."

=== Box office ===
Kinematograph Weekly listed it as being "in the money" at the British box office in 1958.

== Notes ==
- Porter, Vincent (2001). "All Change at Elstree: Warner Bros., ABPC and British Film Policy, 1945–1961". Historical Journal of Film, Radio and Television. 21 (1): 5–35. doi:10.1080/01439680020030879. S2CID 191341678.
