= Upādhyāyula Sūryanārāyaṇa Rāo =

Telugu playwright and journalist

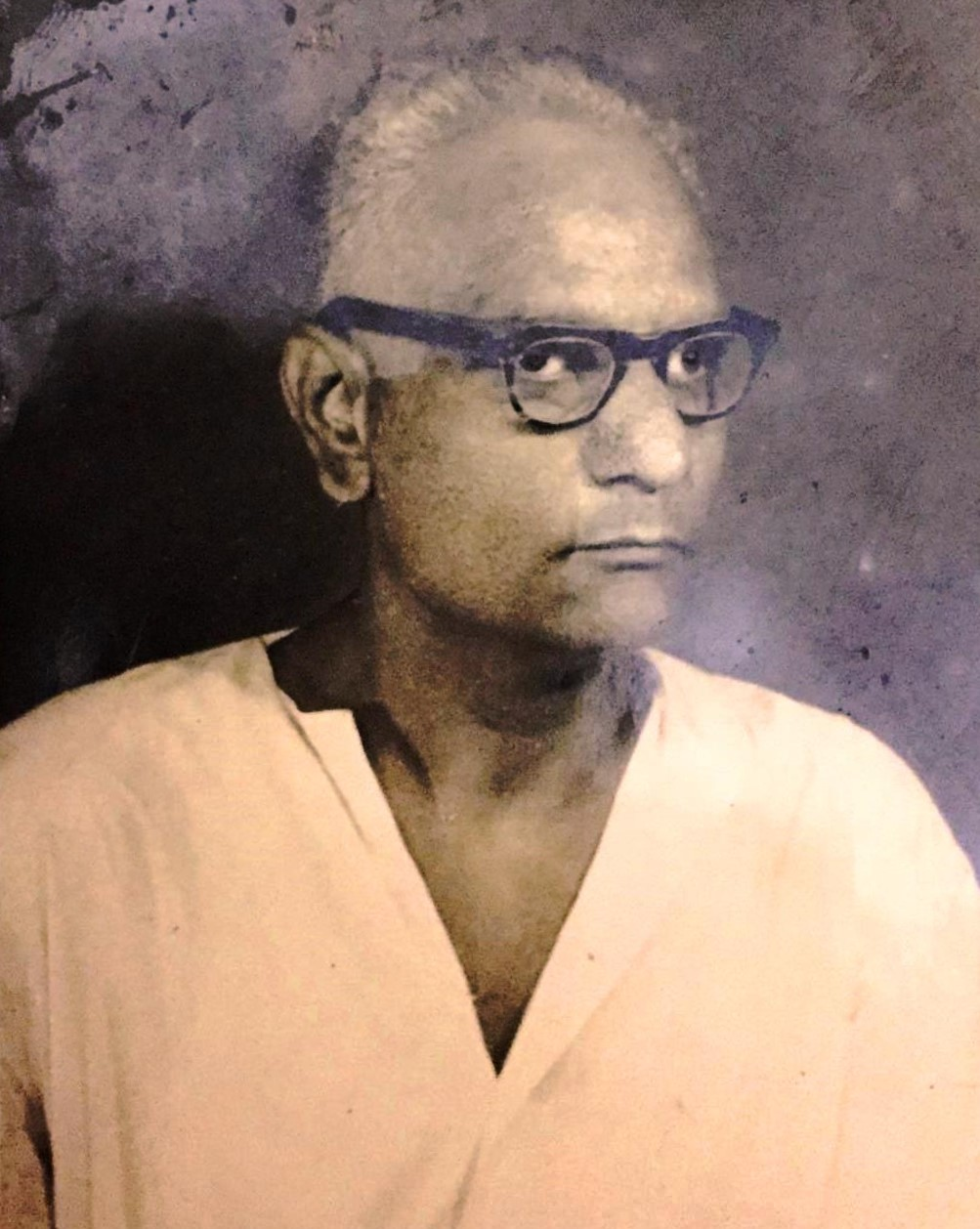
Upadhyayula Suryanarayana Rao

Upādhyāyula Sūryanārāyaṇa Rāo (1923–1971) was a Telugu playwright and journalist who lived and worked in Vizianagaram, Andhra Pradesh. He was the grandson of the panditAdibhatla Narayana Dasu. A school drop-out, he educated himself in literature, history and philosophy. He was actively associated with the Telugu stage and was one of the founding members of the Sri Vijayarama Nataka Kala Parishat, which regularly conducted drama competitions. He was often invited by other organisers as a judge for drama competitions. He was associated with the Praja Socialist Party in its early years.

He began his journalistic career as a freelancer writing for Roopavani (a Telugu film and politics monthly published from Madras) and Swatantra (a political fortnightly published in Telugu and English from Madras). In later years he also contributed articles to Jyothi (a Telugu weekly political tabloid published from Vijayawada). He worked for Andhra Prabha and Indian Express as correspondent from 1962 to 1971. In the 1960s he worked as the associate editor of The Advertiser, a local weekly. He edited and published Navanitham, the first digest type magazine in Telugu.

Sūryanārāyaṇa Rāo (Upādhyāyula or USu for his readers) was known for his biting satire. In a special issue of The Advertiser, he published "Nakamlo Gurajada Jaadalu", a tongue-in-cheek imaginary interview with Gurajada Appa Rao, that satirized politicization of literature.

He translated and adapted Rabindranath Tagore's short story Kabuliwallah as a shadow play for the Telugu stage. Another of his plays, Vijayanagara Vaibhavamu was broadcast on All India Radio in its For the Universities programme. He translated W. Somerset Maugham's play Penelope into Telugu as Pankajakshi, which was serialized in Andhra Prabha weekly and was later published in book form. He translated into Telugu and published a selection of Guy de Maupassant's short stories.
