= For Better, for Worse (1954 film) =

British comedy by J. Lee Thompson

- British theatrical poster
- Directed by: J. Lee Thompson
- Written by: J. Lee Thompson; Peter Myers; Alec Grahame
- Based on: For Better, for Worse by Arthur Watkyn
- Produced by: Kenneth Harper
- Starring: Dirk Bogarde; Susan Stephen; Cecil Parker; Eileen Herlie; Athene Seyler
- Cinematography: Guy Green
- Edited by: Peter Taylor
- Music by: Angela Morley
- Production company: Kenwood Productions
- Distributed by: Associated British-Pathe
- Release date: 27 September 1954
- Running time: 85 minutres
- Country: United Kingdom
- Language: English
- Box office: £206,736 (UK)

For Better, for Worse (U.S. title Cocktails in the Kitchen) is a 1954 British comedy film in Eastmancolor directed by J. Lee Thompson and starring Dirk Bogarde, Susan Stephen and Cecil Parker. It was written by Thompson, Peter Myers and Alec Grahame based on Arthur Watkyn's 1948 play For Better, for Worse.

== Plot ==
Tony and Anne are a young couple who decide to get married. However Tony does not have the required prospects that her father insists on, so he sets his future son-in-law some conditions before allowing the wedding.

== Cast ==
- Dirk Bogarde as Tony Howard
- Susan Stephen as Anne Purves
- Cecil Parker as Anne's father
- Eileen Herlie as Anne's mother
- Athene Seyler as Miss Mainbrace
- Dennis Price as Debenham
- Pia Terri as Mrs. Debenham
- James Hayter as the plumber
- Thora Hird as Mrs. Doyle
- George Woodbridge as Alf
- Charles Victor as Fred
- Sid James as the foreman
- Peter Jones as the car salesman
- Edwin Styles as Anne's boss
- Mary Law as girl in office
- Leonard Sharp as first workman
- Dennis Wyndham as second workman
- Robin Bailey as store salesman
- Digby Wolfe as grocer's assistant
- Geoffrey Hibbert as butcher's assistant
- Ronnie Stevens as fishmonger's assistant
- Jackie Collins as glamour girl

== Production ==
The film was based on a play by Arthur Watkins of the British Board of Film Censors, who wrote plays under the pen name Arthur Watkyn.

Film rights were purchased by Associated British. Susan Stephens had just been in His Excellency (1952) for Ealing Studios.

It was the first role for Pia Terri.

Filming took place at Elstree Studios, starting 1 March 1954. It was the first film shot there to use Eastman colour. The film's sets were designed by the art director Michael Stringer.

== Reception ==
=== Box office ===
The film was successful at the box office in Britain, helped in part by the fact Dirk Bogarde had just been seen in Doctor in the House (1954). According to Kinematograph Weekly the film was a "money maker" at the British box office in 1954.

=== Critical reception ===
The Monthly Film Bulletin wrote: "There is nothing very original about this domestic comedy, adapted from a successful stage play, but it is played with charm and vivacity by Susan Stephen and Dirk Bogarde, and a supporting cast of experienced players brings more life than usual to some familiar types – tiresome spinster (Athene Seyler), talkative char (Thora Hird), worldly-wise middle-class parents (Eileen Herlie and Cecil Parker). Only Dennis Price and Pia Terri, as the couple in the flat above, rather force the note. Direction is smooth, Eastmancolour pleasing, and the settings also have more chic and style than usual. The young couple even sleep between white and pastel blues striped sheets."

Sky Movies noted "Arthur Watkyn's famous stage success has proved successful material for drama societies up and down the land – but still comes up like new in this bright little film version ... Warm, human and charmingly funny domestic comedy, dressed up as fresh as paint by the colour camerawork."
