= Frith Banbury =

British actor and director (1912–2008)

Frith Banbury MBE
- Born: Frederick Harold Frith Banbury; 4 May 1912; Plymouth, Devon, England
- Died: 14 May 2008 (aged 96); London, England
- Occupations: Actor; Stage director
- Years active: 1933–2000

Frederick Harold Frith Banbury MBE (4 May 1912 – 14 May 2008) was a British theatre actor and director.

Banbury was born in Plymouth, Devon, on 4 May 1912, the son of Rear Admiral Frederick Arthur Frith Banbury and his wife Winifred (née Fink).

While attending Stowe School, Banbury rejected his father's naval background by refusing to join the Officer Training Corps, later being registered as a conscientious objector, enabling him to continue acting throughout the Second World War. He went on to attend Hertford College, Oxford, though he left after one year without obtaining an academic degree. He trained for the stage at the Royal Academy of Dramatic Art alongside Joan Littlewood, Rachel Kempson, Robert Morley, and Peter Bull.

Banbury died on 14 May 2008, at the age of 96.

== Theatrical career ==
Banbury made his first stage appearance on 15 June 1933, playing a walk-on part in If I Were You at the Shaftesbury Theatre. He continued to act through the 1930s and 40s, appearing at such venues as the Ambassadors Theatre, the Little Theatre, the Gate Theatre, the Apollo Theatre, and the Q Theatre.

After World War II, Banbury was invited back to the Royal Academy of Dramatic Art to direct. He made his professional directing breakthrough by directing Dark Summer, a play written by fellow pacifist Wynyard Browne. Other early successes for Banbury included The Holly and the Ivy, Waters of the Moon, and The Deep Blue Sea.

The latter was one of three plays which Banbury directed on Broadway, with the other two being Flowering Cherry and The Right Honourable Gentleman. Other locations at which Banbury directed plays include the Cambridge Theatre in 1971, (Captain Brassbound's Conversion), Old Vic theatre, the Edinburgh Festival, the Chichester Festival Theatre, Paris, Dublin, South Africa, Kenya, and Australia.

== Archive ==
The papers of Frith Banbury were purchased by the Harry Ransom Center at the University of Texas at Austin in the 1990s as part of their extensive holdings of contemporary British theatre. The collection opened to the public in 1996. The archive consists of over sixty boxes of scripts, correspondence, posters, programs, photographs, publicity clippings and scrapbooks, reviews, and financial records pertaining to his career from 1926-1995. The Ransom Center also holds a collection of material relating to the 1952 American production of Terence Rattigan's The Deep Blue Sea, which was directed by Banbury.

== Filmography ==
=== Film ===
Year	Title	Role	Notes
1938	Goodness, How Sad	Peter Thropp	TV film
1943	The Life and Death of Colonel Blimp	Baby-Face Fitzroy	
1948	Bond Street	Dress Designer	Uncredited
1949	The History of Mr. Polly	Gold-Spectacled Young Man	Uncredited
1949	The Huggetts Abroad	French Doctor	
