= The Holly and the Ivy (play) =

1950 play

- Original language: English
- Written by: Wynyard Browne
- Genre: Drama

Premiere
- Date: 6 March 1950
- Place: Prince of Wales Theatre, Cardiff

The Holly and the Ivy is a 1950 play by the British writer Wynyard Browne. A vicar attempts to deal with the various problems of his family as they gather for the Christmas period.

It originally premiered at the Prince of Wales Theatre, Cardiff before transferring to the Lyric Theatre, Hammersmith where it ran for 37 performances. It then began a West End run of 412 performances at the Duchess Theatre between 10 May 1950 and 5 May 1951. The West End cast included Herbert Lomas, Jane Baxter, Bryan Forbes, Patrick Waddington, Andrew Crawford, Maureen Delany and Margaret Halstan.

The play was also performed in Australia in August 1954 produced by James Mills for the Independent Theatre and starring O.D. Bissett as the country gentelmen and Diana Davidson.

== Adaptation ==
In 1952 it was adapted into a film of the same title by London Films, directed by George More O'Ferrall and starring Ralph Richardson, Celia Johnson and Margaret Leighton.

== Bibliography ==
- Goble, Alan. The Complete Index to Literary Sources in Film. Walter de Gruyter, 1999.
- Wearing, J.P. The London Stage 1950-1959: A Calendar of Productions, Performers, and Personnel. Rowman & Littlefield, 2014.
