= A Question of Fact =

1953 play

- Written by: Wynyard Browne
- Original language: English
- Genre: Drama

Premiere
- Date premiered: 21 September 1953
- Place premiered: New Theatre, Oxford

A Question of Fact is a 1953 play by the British writer Wynyard Browne. A schoolteacher questions his beliefs and his career when he discovers that his father was hanged for murder.

It was first staged at the New Theatre, Oxford before transferring to the Piccadilly Theatre in London's West End where it ran for 242 performances between 10 December 1953 and 10 July 1954. The original cast included Pamela Brown, Paul Scofield, Gladys Cooper, Henry Hewitt, Maureen Delany and Edith Sharpe.

== Bibliography ==
- Wearing, J.P. The London Stage 1950-1959: A Calendar of Productions, Performers, and Personnel. Rowman & Littlefield, 2014.
