= Michael Redgrave =

English actor and filmmaker (1908–1985)

Sir Michael Redgrave CBE
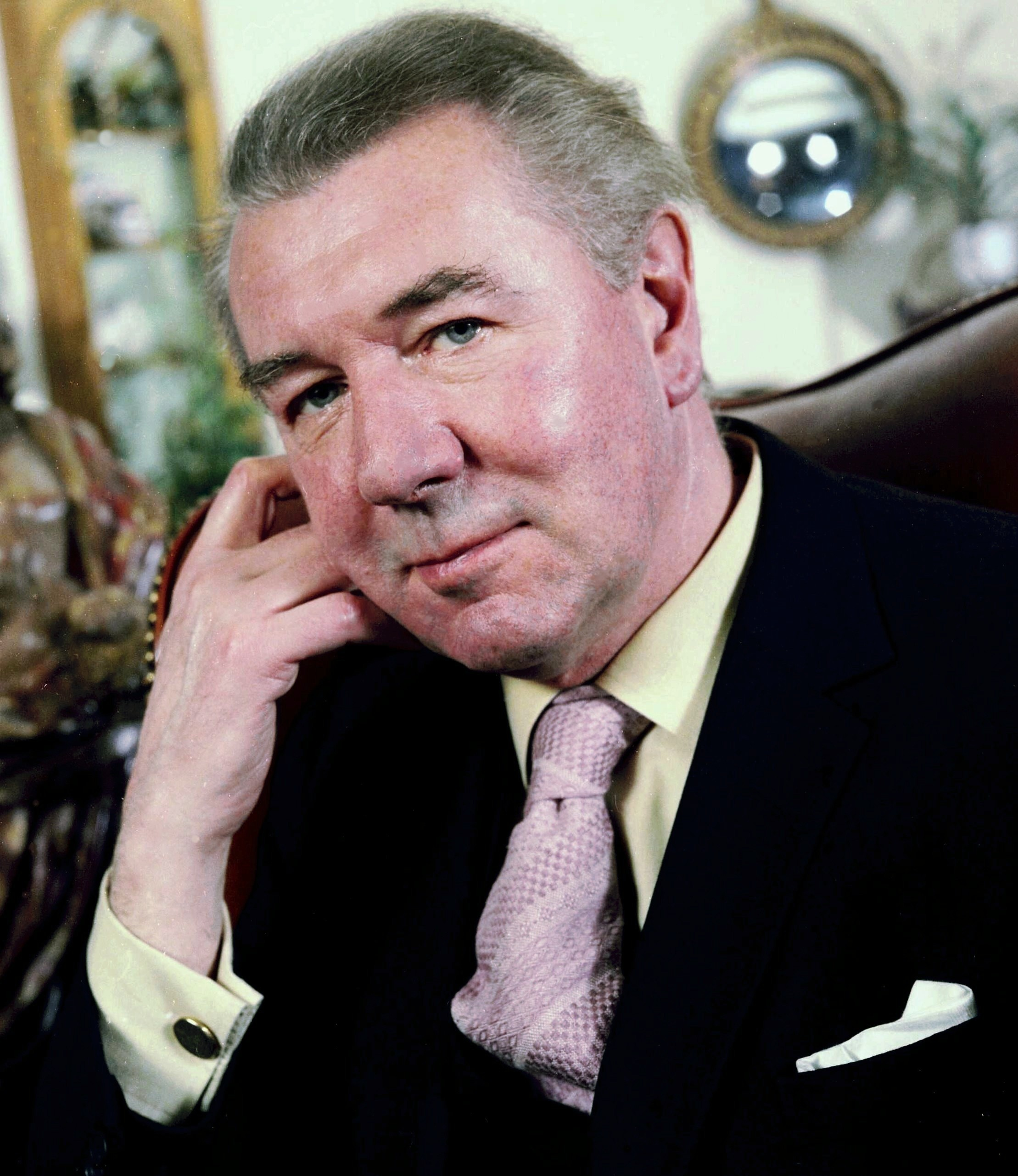
- Redgrave in 1978
- Born: 20 March 1908; Bristol, England
- Died: 21 March 1985 (aged 77); Denham, Buckinghamshire, England
- Resting place: St Paul's, Covent Garden, London, England
- Education: Magdalene College, Cambridge
- Occupations: Actor; filmmaker; manager; author
- Years active: 1933–1982
- Spouse: Rachel Kempson (m. 1935)
- Children: Vanessa; Corin; Lynn
- Parents: Roy Redgrave; Margaret Scudamore
- Family: Redgrave

Sir Michael Scudamore Redgrave (20 March 1908 – 21 March 1985) was an English actor and filmmaker. Beginning his career in theatre, he first appeared in the West End in 1937. He made his film debut in Alfred Hitchcock's The Lady Vanishes in 1938. He and his contemporaries John Gielgud, Laurence Olivier and Ralph Richardson made up a quartet of male actors who dominated the British stage of the mid-20th century.

Redgrave received a nomination for the Academy Award for Best Actor for his performance in Mourning Becomes Electra (1947), as well as two BAFTA nominations for Best British Actor for his performances in The Night My Number Came Up (1955) and Time Without Pity (1957).

At the 4th Cannes Film Festival, he won Best Actor for his performance in The Browning Version (1951).

== Youth and education ==
Redgrave was born at No. 4 Horfield Road, just off St Michael's Hill, Bristol, England. The house is marked with a blue plaque. He was the son of actress Margaret Scudamore and the silent film actor Roy Redgrave. Roy left when Redgrave was six months old to pursue a career in Australia. He died when Redgrave was 14. His mother subsequently married Captain James Anderson, a tea planter. Redgrave greatly disliked his stepfather.

Redgrave attended Clifton College in Bristol. Clifton College Theatre was opened in 1966 by Redgrave as the first purpose-built school theatre in the country. After his death, the building was renamed The Redgrave Theatre in his honour.

Upon leaving Clifton, Redgrave went on to study the modern languages and English triposes at Magdalene College, Cambridge. Under the direction of Dadie Rylands, he garnered great acclaim for his starring roles on the Cambridge stage as Edgar, Prince Hal and Captain Brassbound. Alongside the art historian Anthony Blunt and schoolfriend Robin Fedden, Redgrave also edited an avant-garde literary magazine called The Venture, which published work by Louis MacNeice, Julian Bell and John Lehmann. He graduated with a third-class degree in 1931.

Redgrave taught modern languages at Cranleigh School in Surrey for three years before becoming an actor in 1934. He directed the boys in Hamlet, King Lear and The Tempest, but played all the leading roles himself.

== Theatre career ==
Redgrave made his first professional appearance at the Playhouse in Liverpool on 30 August 1934 as Roy Darwin in Counsellor-at-Law (by Elmer Rice). He then spent two years with the Liverpool Repertory Company; while there, he met his future wife, Rachel Kempson.

=== 1930s ===
Offered a job by Tyrone Guthrie, Redgrave made his professional debut in London at the Old Vic on 14 September 1936, playing Ferdinand in Love's Labours Lost. During 1936–37 he also played Mr Horner in The Country Wife, Orlando in As You Like It, Warbeck in The Witch of Edmonton and Laertes to Laurence Olivier's Hamlet. His hit of the season was Orlando. Edith Evans was his Rosalind and the two fell very much in love. As he later explained: "Edith always had a habit of falling in love with her leading men; with us it just went rather further." As You Like It transferred to the West End's New Theatre in February 1937 and Redgrave again played Orlando.

At the Embassy Theatre in March 1937, he played Anderson in a mystery play, The Bat, before returning to the Old Vic in April, succeeding Marius Goring as Chorus in Henry V. Other roles that year included Christopher Drew in Daisy Fisher's comedy A Ship Comes Home at St Martin's Theatre in May and Larry Starr in Philip Leaver's comedy Three Set Out at the Embassy in June, before joining John Gielgud's company at the Queen's Theatre from September 1937 to April 1938, where he played Bolingbroke in Richard II, Charles Surface in The School for Scandal and Baron Tusenbach in Three Sisters.

=== World War II ===
Redgrave joined the Royal Navy as an ordinary seaman in July 1941, (HMS Illustrious) but was discharged on medical grounds in November 1942. Having spent most of 1942 in the Reserve he managed to direct Lifeline (Norman Armstrong) starring Frank Pettingell at the Duchess Theatre in July; and The Duke in Darkness (Patrick Hamilton) starring Leslie Banks at the St James's Theatre in October, also taking the role of Gribaud.

=== 1950s ===
Redgrave joined the Shakespeare Memorial Theatre company at Stratford-upon-Avon and for the 1951 season appeared as Prospero in The Tempest as well as playing Richard II, Hotspur and Chorus in the Cycle of Histories, for which he also directed Henry IV Part Two. After appearing as Frank Elgin in Winter Journey at the St James's April 1952, he rejoined the Stratford company in 1953 (together with his actress wife, Rachel Kempson) appearing as Shylock, King Lear and Antony in Antony and Cleopatra, also playing Antony when the company transferred to the Prince's Theatre in November 1953, before touring in the Netherlands, Belgium and Paris.

At the Apollo in June 1955 he played Hector in Tiger at the Gates, appearing in the same role at the Plymouth Theatre, New York City in October 1955 for which he received the New York Critics' Award. While in America, he directed A Month in the Country at the Phoenix Theatre in April 1956, and directed and played the Prince Regent in The Sleeping Prince with Barbara Bel Geddes at the Coronet Theatre, Los Angeles in November 1956.

Returning to London in January 1958, Redgrave appeared as Philip Lester in A Touch of the Sun (N. C. Hunter) at the Saville Theatre. He won Best Actor at the Evening Standard Theatre Awards 1958 for this role. He rejoined the Shakespeare Memorial Theatre Company in June 1958, to play Hamlet and Benedick, also playing Hamlet with the company in Leningrad and Moscow in December 1958. (His wife Rachel Kempson played Ursula in Much Ado About Nothing and Lady Capulet in Romeo and Juliet).

At the Queen's Theatre, in London in August 1959, he played H.J. in his own adaptation of the Henry James novella The Aspern Papers. His play was later successfully revived on Broadway in 1962, with Wendy Hiller and Maurice Evans. The 1984 London revival featured his daughter, Vanessa Redgrave, along with Christopher Reeve and Hiller, this time in the role of Miss Bordereau.

=== 1960s ===
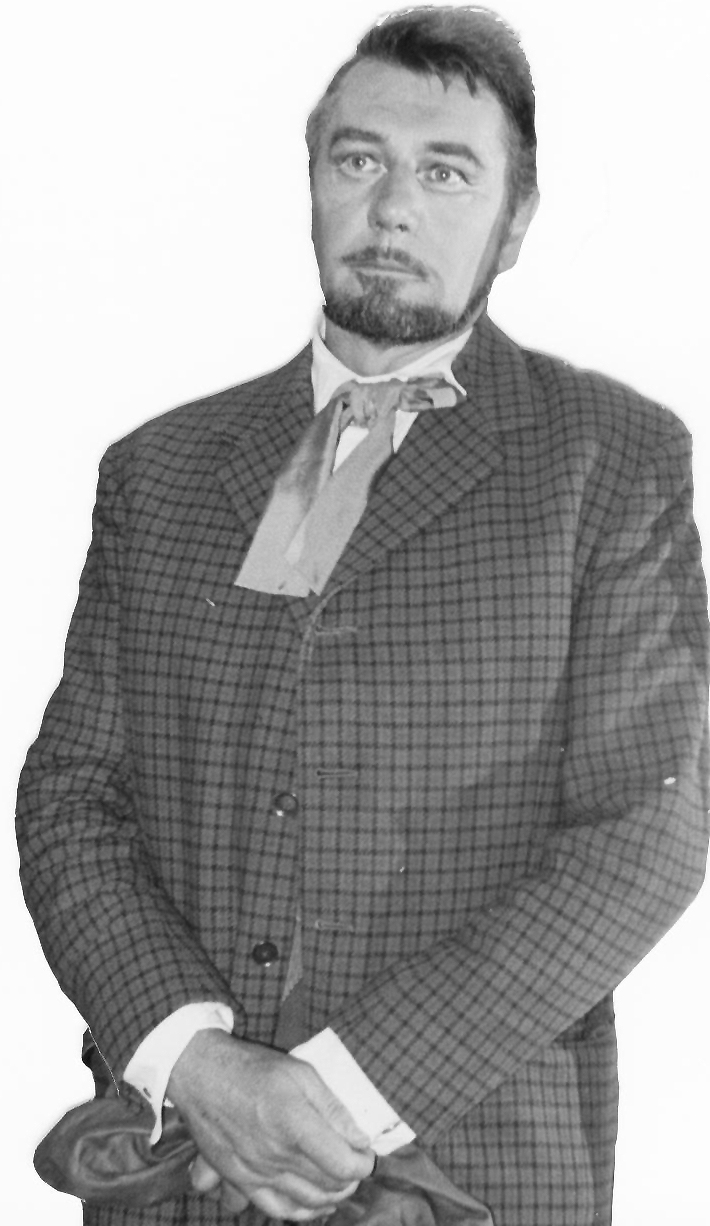
Michael Redgrave in costume for the lead role in Uncle Vanya, backstage at the Chichester Festival Theatre, 1962. Photo: Tony French.

Returning to the UK, in July 1962 he took part in the Chichester Festival Theatre's opening season, playing the title role in Chekhov's Uncle Vanya to the Astrov of Laurence Olivier, who also directed.

Alongside John Dexter's Chichester staging of Saint Joan, Olivier's Uncle Vanya was first revived in Chichester in 1963 before transferring to the Old Vic as part of the nascent National Theatre's inaugural season, winning rave reviews and Redgrave's second win as Best Actor at the 1963 Evening Standard Awards. Critic Michael Billington recalled: "In Redgrave's Vanya you saw both a tremulous victim of a lifetime's emotional repression and the wasted potential of a Chekhovian might-have-been: as Redgrave and Olivier took their joint curtain call, linked hands held triumphantly aloft, we were not to know that this was to symbolise the end of their artistic amity."

Redgrave played (and co-presented) Lancelot Dodd MA in Arthur Watkyn's Out of Bounds at Wyndham's Theatre in November 1962, following it at the Old Vic with his portrayal of Claudius opposite the Hamlet of Peter O'Toole in October 1963. This Hamlet was in fact the National Theatre's official opening production, directed by Olivier, but Simon Callow has dubbed it "slow, solemn, long", while Ken Campbell vividly described it as "brochure theatre."

In January 1964, at the National, he played the title role in Hobson's Choice, which he admitted was well outside his range: "I couldn't do the Lancashire accent and that shook my nerve terribly – all the other performances suffered." While still at the National in June 1964, he also played Halvard Solness in The Master Builder, which he said 'went wrong'. At this time he had incipient Parkinson's disease, although he did not know it.

In May and June 1965, Redgrave directed the opening festival of the Yvonne Arnaud Theatre in Guildford, including directing and playing Rakitin in A Month in the Country (co-starring with Ingrid Bergman as Natalya Petrovna), and Samson in Samson Agonistes (co-starring with Rachel Kempson as Chorus). He again played Rakitin in September 1965, when his production transferred to the Cambridge Theatre in London. For the Glyndebourne Festival Opera he directed Werther in 1966 and La bohème in 1967.

=== 1970s ===
At the Mermaid Theatre in July 1971 he played Mr Jaraby in The Old Boys (William Trevor) and had an unfortunate experience: "My memory went, and on the first night they made me wear a deaf aid to hear some lines from the prompter and it literally fell to pieces – there were little bits of machinery all over the floor, so I then knew I really couldn't go on, at least not learning new plays."

Nevertheless, he successfully took over the part of Father in John Mortimer's A Voyage Round My Father at the Theatre Royal Haymarket, also touring Canada and Australia in the role in 1972–73.

He returned to international touring in 1974–75 with a Royal Shakespeare Company production of The Hollow Crown, visiting major venues in the US, New Zealand and Australia, while in 1976–77 he toured South America, Canada, the UK and the US in the anthology, Shakespeare's People.

Redgrave's final theatre appearance came in May 1979 when he portrayed Jasper in Simon Gray's Close of Play, directed on the Lyttelton stage at the National Theatre by Harold Pinter. It was a silent, seated role, based on Gray's own father, who had died a year before he wrote the play. As Gray has said: "Jasper is in fact dead but is forced to endure, as if alive, a traditional English Sunday, helpless in his favourite armchair as his three sons and their wives fall to pieces in the usual English middle class style, sometimes blaming him, sometimes appealing to him for help and sobbing at his feet for forgiveness, but basically ignoring him. In other words I had stuck him in Hell, which turns out to be 'life, old life itself'."

== Film and television career ==
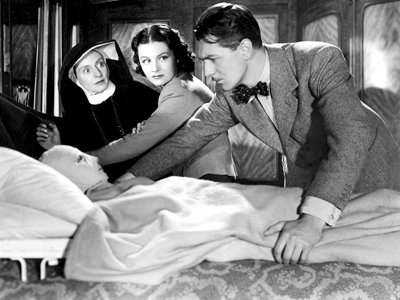
Redgrave (right) with Catherine Lacey and Margaret Lockwood in a publicity shot for Hitchcock's The Lady Vanishes (1938)

Redgrave first appeared on BBC television at the Alexandra Palace in 1937, in scenes from Romeo and Juliet. His first major film role was in Alfred Hitchcock's The Lady Vanishes (1938), which included a scene where he hummed the "Colonel Bogey March" in what was the first appearance of the tune in film. Ted Black put him under contract at Gainsborough.

Redgrave also starred in The Stars Look Down (1940), with James Mason in the film of Robert Ardrey's play Thunder Rock (1942), and in the ventriloquist's dummy episode of the Ealing compendium film Dead of Night (1945).

In 1946, the Motion Picture Herald annual poll of British film exhibitors showed that Redgrave was ranked in fourth place on a list of the most popular British stars at the box office.

His first American film role was opposite Rosalind Russell in Mourning Becomes Electra (1947), for which he was nominated for an Academy Award for Best Actor. In 1951 he starred in The Browning Version, from Terence Rattigan's play of the same name. The Daily Mirror described Redgrave's performance as Crocker-Harris as "one of the greatest performances ever seen in films".

In 1951, the Motion Picture Herald annual poll of British film exhibitors showed that Redgrave was ranked in ninth place on a list of the most popular British stars at the box office.

The 1950s also saw Redgrave in The Importance of Being Earnest (1952), The Dambusters (1954) with his portrayal of the inventor Barnes Wallis, 1984 (1956), Time Without Pity (1957), for which he was nominated for a BAFTA Award, and The Quiet American (1958). During the 1960s he was featured in The Loneliness of the Long Distance Runner, and in the 1970s he starred opposite Bette Davis in Connecting Rooms (1970) and played Sergey Sazonov in Nicholas and Alexandra (1971).

Notable television performances include narration for The Great War (1964), a history of World War I using stills and 'stretched' archive film, and the less successful Lost Peace series (BBC Television, 1964 and 1966). Of the latter, Philip Purser wrote: "The commentary, spoken by Sir Michael Redgrave, took on an unremittingly pessimistic tone from the outset." In 1970 he played Polonius in an ITV production of Hamlet that was broadcast in the United States as a Hallmark Hall of Fame special, and in 1973 he played a supporting role in David Winters' musical television film adaptation of Dr. Jekyll and Mr. Hyde, starring Kirk Douglas.

In 1975, Redgrave narrated the epic poem The Rime of the Ancient Mariner by Samuel Taylor Coleridge (a poem that Redgrave taught as a young schoolmaster). The film received six international film festival prizes, of which five were first place in category.

== Sound recordings ==
Redgrave can be heard on Caedmon Records' The Merchant of Venice (as Shylock), The Tempest (as Prospero), Pygmalion (as Henry Higgins), The Poetry of Alexander Pope, Samson Agonistes, Gulliver's Travels, and Tales of Hans Christian Andersen. He also played the title roles in abridged versions of Hamlet, Macbeth, and Richard II for the Living Shakespeare series.

== Personal life ==
=== Family ===
Redgrave married actress Rachel Kempson in 1935. They remained married for 50 years from 1935 until his death. Their children Vanessa (b. 1937), Corin (1939–2010) and Lynn Redgrave (1943–2010), and their grandchildren Natasha Richardson (1963–2009), Joely Richardson (b. 1965) and Jemma Redgrave (b. 1965) have also been involved in theatre and film as actors. Their grandson Carlo Gabriel Nero is a screenwriter and film director; only Luke Redgrave has taken a path outside the theatre.

His daughter Lynn wrote a one-woman play for herself called Shakespeare for My Father. She was nominated for Broadway's Tony Award for this role. She traced her love for Shakespeare as a way of following and finding her often absent father.

Redgrave owned White Roding Windmill from 1937 to 1946. He and his family lived in Bedford House on Chiswick Mall from 1945 to 1954. His entry for Who's Who in the Theatre (1981) gives his address as Wilks Water, Odiham, Hampshire.

=== Bisexuality ===
Corin helped his father in the writing of his last autobiography. During one of Corin's visits to his father, the latter said, "There is something I ought to tell you". Then, after a long pause, "I am, to say the least of it, bisexual". Corin encouraged him to acknowledge his bisexuality in the book. Redgrave agreed to do so, but in the end he chose to remain silent about it. Alan Strachan's 2004 biography of Redgrave discusses his affairs with both men and women. Although Redgrave had some long-term relationships with men, he also was prone to cruising Victoria or Knightsbridge for what he called "a necessary degradation", a habit of quick pick-ups that left him with a lasting sense of self-disgust.

The 1996 BBC documentary film Michael Redgrave: My Father, narrated by Corin Redgrave, and based on his book of the same name, discusses his father's bisexuality in some depth. Rachel Kempson recounted that when she proposed to him, Redgrave said that there were "difficulties to do with his nature, and that he felt he ought not to marry". She said that she understood, it did not matter, and that she loved him. To this, Redgrave replied, "Very well. If you're sure, we will".

During the filming of Fritz Lang's Secret Beyond the Door (1947), Redgrave met Bob Mitchell, and they soon became lovers. Mitchell set up house close to the Redgraves, and he became a surrogate "uncle" to Redgrave's children (then aged 11, 9 and 5), who adored him. Mitchell later had children of his own, including a son he named Michael. Fred Sadoff was an actor/director who became Redgrave's assistant and lover; they shared lodgings in New York and London.

A card was found among Redgrave's effects after his death. The card was signed "Tommy, Liverpool, January 1940", and on it were the words (quoted from W.H. Auden): "The word is love. Surely one fearless kiss would cure the million fevers".

=== Illness and death ===
In 1976, after suffering symptoms for many years, Redgrave was diagnosed with rapidly advancing Parkinson's disease. He began a regimen of therapies and medications that caused disorientation and other side effects. Costs for his healthcare expenses and his diminished earning power caused the family to apply for public assistance from the King George's Pension Fund for Actors and Actresses. In an interview on his 70th birthday, he said: "For a long time, nobody understood the Parkinson's condition, and directors thought I was just forgetful or drunk – and even now the work isn't easy. The difficulty is not just remembering lines but getting from place to place."

Redgrave died in a nursing home in Denham, Buckinghamshire, on 21 March 1985, from Parkinson's disease, the day after his 77th birthday. He was cremated at Mortlake Crematorium and his ashes were scattered in the garden of St Paul's, Covent Garden (The Actors' Church), London.

== Awards and honors ==
In 1951, Redgrave received the Best Actor Award (Cannes Film Festival) for The Browning Version. He won Best Actor trophies at the 1958 and 1963 Evening Standard Awards and received the Variety Club of Great Britain 'Actor of the Year' award in the same years.

Redgrave was appointed Commander of the Order of the British Empire (CBE) by the Queen in 1952 and knighted in 1959. He was appointed Commander of the Order of the Dannebrog by Denmark in 1955.

The Redgrave Theatre in Farnham, Surrey, 1974–1998, was named in his honour.

In 1986, he was inducted posthumously into the American Theater Hall of Fame.

== Writings ==
Redgrave wrote five books:

- Water Music for a Botanist W. Heffer, Cambridge (1929) Poem
- The Actor's Ways and Means Heinemann (1953)
- Mask or Face: Reflections in an Actor's Mirror Heinemann (1958)
- The Mountebank's Tale Heinemann (1959)
- In My Mind's I: An Actor's Autobiography Viking (1983) ISBN 0-670-14233-6

His plays include The Seventh Man and Circus Boy, both performed at the Liverpool Playhouse in 1935, and his adaptations of A Woman in Love (Amourese) at the Embassy Theatre in 1949 and the Henry James novella The Aspern Papers at the Queen's Theatre, in 1959.

== Filmography ==
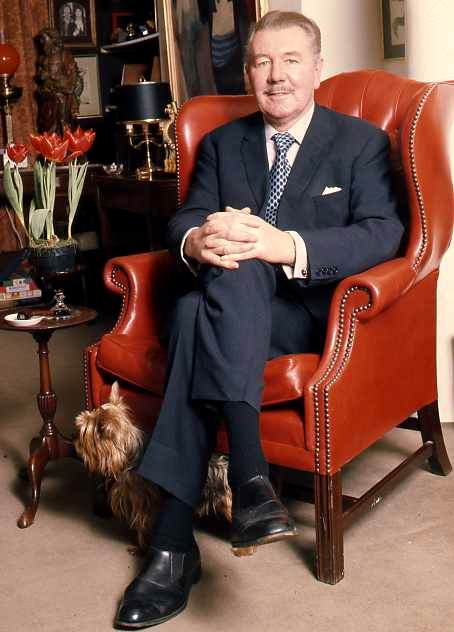
Sir Michael Redgrave by Allan Warren, 1973

=== Film ===
Year	Title	Role	Notes
1938	The Lady Vanishes	Gilbert	First major role
1938	Climbing High	Nicky Brooke	
1939	Stolen Life	Alan MacKenzie	
1940	The Stars Look Down	Davey Fenwick	
1940	A Window in London	Peter	Released as Lady in Distress in USA
1941	Kipps	Kipps	Released as The Remarkable Mr. Kipps in USA
1941	Atlantic Ferry	Charles MacIver	
1941	Jeannie	Stanley Smith	
1942	The Big Blockade	Russian	
1942	Thunder Rock	David Charleston	
1945	The Way to the Stars	David Archdale	Released as Johnny in the Clouds in USA
1945	Dead of Night	Maxwell Frere	
1946	The Captive Heart	Captain Karel Hasek	
1946	The Years Between	Michael Wentworth	
1947	The Man Within	Richard Carlyon	Released as The Smugglers in the USA
1947	Fame Is the Spur	Hamer Radshaw	
1947	Mourning Becomes Electra	Orin Mannon	
1947	Secret Beyond the Door	Mark Lamphere	
1951	The Browning Version	Andrew Crocker-Harris	
1951	The Magic Box	Mr Lege	
1952	The Importance of Being Earnest	Jack/Ernest Worthing	
1954	The Green Scarf	Maitre Deliot	
1954	The Sea Shall Not Have Them	Air Commodore Waltby	
1955	The Night My Number Came Up	Air Marshal Hardie	
1955	The Dam Busters	Barnes Wallis	
1955	Mr. Arkadin	Burgomil Trebitsch	
1955	Oh... Rosalinda!!	Colonel Eisenstein	
1956	1984	O'Connor (O'Brien)	
1957	Time Without Pity	David Graham	
1957	The Happy Road	General Medworth	
1958	The Quiet American	Thomas Fowler	
1958	Law and Disorder	Percy Brand	
1958	Behind the Mask	Sir Arthur Benson Gray	
1959	Shake Hands with the Devil	The General	
1959	The Wreck of the Mary Deare	Mr Nyland	
1961	No My Darling Daughter	Sir Matthew Carr	
1961	The Innocents	The Uncle	
1962	The Loneliness of the Long Distance Runner	Ruxton Towers Reformatory Governor	
1963	Uncle Vanya	Uncle Vanya	
1965	Young Cassidy	W. B. Yeats	
1965	The Hill	The Medical Officer	(credited as Sir Michael Redgrave)
1965	The Heroes of Telemark	Uncle	
1966	Alice in Wonderland	Caterpillar	(credited as Sir Michael Redgrave)
1967	The 25th Hour	Defence lawyer	
1968	Assignment K	Harris	
1968	Heidi	Grandfather	TV movie
1969	Oh! What a Lovely War	General Sir Henry Wilson	
1969	Battle of Britain	Air Vice Marshal Evill	
1969	Goodbye, Mr. Chips	The Headmaster	
1970	David Copperfield	Dan Peggotty	TV movie
1970	Connecting Rooms	James Wallraven	
1970	Goodbye Gemini	James Harrington-Smith	
1971	The Go-Between	Leo Colston	
1971	A Christmas Carol	Narrator	Voice
1971	Nicholas and Alexandra	Sazonov	
1972	The Last Target	Erik Fritsch	
1975	Rime of the Ancient Mariner	The Ancient Mariner	narration, (final film role)

== Radio appearances ==
Year	Programme	Episode/source
1948	CBS's Studio One	The Return of the Native
1952/3	Horatio Hornblower	48 Episodes in the title role on CBS
1952	Theatre Guild on the Air	The Unguarded Hour
1953	Theatre Guild on the Air	Jane

== Theatre ==
Year	Title	Role	Director	Playwright(s)	Theatre
1936	Love's Labours Lost	Ferdinand		William Shakespeare	Old Vic Theatre, London
1936-37	The Witch of Edmonton	Warbeck	Saint Denis	Thomas Dekker	Old Vic Theatre, London
1936-37	As You Like It	Orlando	Ejme Church	William Shakespeare	Old Vic Theatre, London
1936-37	The Country Wife	Mr Horner	Tyrone Gathrie	William Wycherley	Old Vic Theatre, London
1937	The Bat	Anderson		Mary Roberts Rinehart and Avery Hopwood	Embassy Theatre
1937	A Ship Comes Home	Christopher Drew		Daisy Fisher	St Martins Theatre
1938	The White Guard	Alexi Turbin		Mikhail Bulgakov	Phoenix Theatre
1938	Twelfth Night	Sir Andrew Agnechek		William Shakespeare	Phoenix Theatre
1939	The Family Reunion	Harry, Lord Monchesney		T. S. Eliot	Westminster Theatre
1940	The Beggar's Opera	Captain Macheath		John Gay	Theatre Royal, Haymarket
1943	A Month in the Country	Rakitin		Ivan Turgenev	St James' Theatre
1947	Macbeth	Macbeth		William Shakespeare	Aldwych Theatre
1958	A Touch of the Sun	Philip Lester		N. C. Hunter	Saville Theatre
1959	The Aspern Papers	H.J		Henry James	Queen's Theatre, London
1960	The Tiger and the Horse	Jack Dean	Frith Banbury	Robert Bolt	Queen's Theatre, London
1961	The Complaisant Lover	Victor Rhodes		Graham Greene	Ethel Barrymore Theatre, New York
1962	Out of Bounds	Launcelot Dodd MA		Arthur Watkyn	Wyndham's Theatre
1962-63	Uncle Vanya	Uncle Vanya	Laurence Olivier	Anton Chekhov	Chichester Festival Theatre
1963	Hamlet	King Claudius	Laurence Olivier	William Shakespeare	National Theatre
1964	Hobson's Choice	Henry Horatio Hobson		Harold Brighouse	National Theatre
1971	The Old Boys	Mr Jaraby		William Trevor	Mermaid Theatre
1971	A Voyage Round My Father	Father		John Mortimer	Theatre Royal, Haymarket
1979	Close of Play	Jasper	Harold Pinter	Simon Gray	National Theatre

== See also ==
- List of Academy Award winners and nominees from Great Britain
- List of British actors
- Lists of knights bachelor
