= Nicolette (play) =

1899 play

- Original language: English
- Written by: Edward Ferris and Arthur Stuart
- Setting: Paris, France

Premiere
- Date: January 3rd, 1899
- Place: Criterion Theatre, London

Nicolette is a one-act drama by Edward Ferris and Arthur Stuart. It premiered at the Criterion Theatre at Piccadilly Circus, London, on 3 January, 1899. It was presented as the curtain raiser in a double bill with the farce My "Soldier" Boy. The cast consisted of Edward Ferris as Horace Villiers, Wilfred Forster as Paul Lamont, Margaret Halstan as Héléne, and Elsie Cross as Madame Margot. The play's run ended on 18 March 1899.

The Weekly Times & Echo praised both the text and its production. Additionally, the reviewer noted that the play met with "a very cordial reception".

The play is set in Paris, France.

== Plot ==
Horace Villiers is a penniless English composer living in Paris. He has just finished his opera, Aucassin and Nicolette, based on the medieval French story of the same name. For two months, he has suffered from injuries incurred when he attempted to stop runaway horses driving the carriage of the famous opera singer Héléne, who has visited his apartment daily since the accident. Horace's landlord, Madame Margot, believes that Héléne is in love with him, but Horace dismisses the thought. He is surprised when Madame Margot informs him that Héléne has paid his rent in full; he becomes determined to pay her back accordingly.

Héléne pays Horace her daily visit. She is set to star in a production playing at the neighboring opera house, written by the composer Paul Lamont. Héléne learns that some time ago, Horace traveled from England to Italy with his then friend, Lucien. When Horace fell ill, he gave Lucien his opera to give to the Royal Opera House in London. When Horace recovered, he set off for Paris to visit his dying father, and never left. Horace never received word from Lucien, and was forced to rewrite his opera from memory.

In spite of Héléne's pleas, Horace will not reveal the name of his opera, nor play its contents. At Héléne's behest, Horace sets off to give the head of the Royal Opera House (in France) the ending of his opera. In Horace's absence, Madame Margot enters, singing a snatch from Horace's opera. Héléne realizes that Paul Lamont is Lucien, and that he has stolen Horace's opera. Héléne, who is in love with Horace, does not know whether or not he is in love with her. In order to find out, she will both pretend to be in love with Lucien and, while feigning ignorance, alert Horace to the fact that his former friend has plagiarized Aucassin and Nicolette. If Horace truly loves her, Héléne determines, he will sacrifice his career so that Héléne will be happy.

Horace behaves just as Héléne had hoped. After Héléne and Lucien leave, Horace bewails the prospect of never seeing Héléne again, as he has promised Lucien that he will depart from France forever. Per an agreement made while Hélène was out of earshot, Lucien will report to a newspaper that his own opera has been stolen, thereby preventing Horace's opera from being staged and Héléne from discovering Lucien's falsehood. In accordance with this plan, Horace will leave Paris for Naples. Believing that she is in love with Lamont, Horace thinks that Hélène will be destroyed if she ever discovers his former friend's deception. Shortly thereafterwards, Héléne tells Horace that she knows everything; has tricked him; and that upon learning Héléne knows of his theft, Lucien has decided to leave the country. Horace proclaims his love for Héléne and the two go off to the neighboring opera house.
