= The Last Target =

1972 British film

The Last Target is an episode of the 1972 British BBC TV series The Man Outside, first broadcast on 12 May 1972. It was directed by George Spenton-Foster and starred Rupert Davies and Michael Redgrave. It was written by Brian Tolka.

== Cast ==
- Rupert Davies as Baker
- Michael Redgrave as Erik Fritsch
- Ann Todd as Leni Fritsch
- Rose Power as landlady
- Philip Madoc as Willy Karlweis
- Scott Fredericks as Paul Kautner
- David Garfield as Ernst Wernicke
- Brian Cobby as TV commentator
