= For Better, for Worse (play) =

1948 play

- Written by: Arthur Watkyn
- Original language: English
- Genre: Comedy
- Setting: Putney, present day

Premiere
- Date premiered: 2 November 1948
- Place premiered: Q Theatre, London

For Better, for Worse is a comedy play by the British writer Arthur Watkyn. It was first performed at the Q Theatre in Kew Bridge in 1948. It enjoyed a lengthy and successful run at the Comedy Theatre in London's West End where it lasted for 618 performances between 17 December 1952 and 12 June 1954. The original West End cast included Leslie Phillips, Geraldine McEwan, Tom Macaulay, Anthony Sharp, Gwynne Whitby, Polly Elwes, Aimée Delamain, Charles Lamb and Dandy Nichols. It was directed by Kenneth Riddington who also appeared in the cast. The plot revolves around the trials and tribulations of a newly-married couple.

== Film adaptation ==
In 1954 it was made into a film of the same title directed by J. Lee Thompson and starring Dirk Bogarde, Susan Stephen and Cecil Parker.

== Bibliography ==
- Goble, Alan. The Complete Index to Literary Sources in Film. Walter de Gruyter, 1999.
- Wearing, J.P. The London Stage 1950-1959: A Calendar of Productions, Performers, and Personnel. Rowman & Littlefield, 2014.
