= Out of Bounds (play) =

1962 play

- Written by: Arthur Watkyn
- Original language: English
- Genre: Comedy thriller
- Setting: London, present day

Premiere
- Date premiered: 8 November 1962
- Place premiered: Wyndham's Theatre, London

Out of Bounds is a comedy thriller play by the British writer Arthur Watkyn. It enjoyed a successful run at Wyndham's Theatre in the West End with Michael Redgrave in the lead role of Lancelot Dodd, a naive headmaster who is an exact Doppelgänger of a British spy who has recently died. The West End cast also included Pauline Jameson, Anton Diffring, Graham Armitage, Peter Stephens, Michael Balfour, Michael Bates, Lionel Gamlin and Charles Heslop. It was directed by Harold French.

== Film adaptation ==
In 1964 it was made into a West German film A Mission for Mr. Dodd directed by Günter Gräwert and Heinz Rühmann and Maria Sebaldt. Anton Diffring who had appeared in the West End play, was also in the film cast.

== Bibliography ==
- Lachman, Marvin. The Villainous Stage: Crime Plays on Broadway and in the West End. McFarland, 2014.
