= Summer Day's Dream =

1949 play

Summer Day's Dream is a 1949 play by J. B. Priestley. It is set in 1975, and evokes a world where a nuclear Third World War has caused Britain to revert to a pre-industrial, pre-capitalist state. It takes its title from Shakespeare's A Midsummer Night's Dream, which is being produced by two members of the English family the play is based around.

== Plot summary ==
Eighty-year-old Stephen Dawlish lives with his daughter-in-law, grandson and granddaughter on the South Downs in Sussex, in a former mansion which is now a farmhouse. There is no political system, no cars or telephones, and goods are exchanged by a barter system. Three characters from the surviving great powers of the world, the United States (Franklyn Heimer), the Soviet Union (Irina Shestova) and India (Dr Bahru), arrive in an attempt to develop a major industrial plant to create synthetic products out of the area's abundant produce of chalk. They initially dismiss the environment as, respectively, out of date, decadent and unenlightened. After a while, they find themselves captivated by the atmosphere of this rural society, and find themselves unable to carry out their plans, and ultimately depart to leave England in its newfound state of peace.

== History ==
The play was first performed in Priestley's native Bradford on 8 August 1949. This production, along with that in London the following month, featured Herbert Lomas as Stephen Dawlish, and also featured Eileen Thorndike (sister of Dame Sybil) and a young Adrienne Corri; the same cast appeared in a BBC Television performance of the play broadcast on 30 October 1949. Before going to London, it also played in Brighton, Bournemouth and Cardiff.

The play was well received by critics when it was initially performed; the Yorkshire Evening Post suggested in its review of the Bradford premiere that it combined "fancy, humour and plain brusque conversational commonsense" and that Priestley had "something to say that he has never said quite so well". The Daily Herald, while mentioning that Priestley had attended the premiere, reported that "many people in the audience thought that the play was one of the best he had ever written". Priestley described the play as "a comedy of ideas and atmosphere". When it opened at St Martin's Theatre in the West End of London there were "at least six curtain calls"; the reviewer of the Birmingham Gazette said that "any rapture was earned less by the merits of Mr Priestley's discussion play shot with poetry than by the escapist glimpse it offers of a Britain 25 years hence that need not worry about missions to Washington" but added with some sarcasm that "unfortunately we presumably have to have a third world war first and ship millions of people abroad - presumably the uncultured and difficult ones", concluding that the best actors acted "as if they were something more than mouthpieces for the author's thoughts on civilisation's dilemmas". The play was presented by the London Mask Theatre in association with the recently formed Arts Council. The Illustrated London News described it as "a fantasy, mellow and serene". George W. Bishop in The Daily Telegraph was reasonably positive, suggesting that Priestley was "again more interested in ideas rather than people ... (it) is simple to the point of naivety".

However, the play's run in London was short-lived; it closed on 15 October 1949 after only 43 performances, because takings had only just managed to climb into three figures a night and the average loss was around £500 each week. The subsequent TV production received at least one negative review from the Essex Newsman, although Emery Pearce in the Daily Herald was much more positive, stating that "Priestley plus television is a new and powerful combination of promise".

== Subsequent revivals ==
Subsequently, the play has only rarely been revived. In 1950, it was performed by the Birmingham Repertory Theatre; a largely critical review in the Birmingham Gazette dismissed Priestley's American, Russian and Indian characters as "mere puppets" and referred critically to Priestley's "cardboard characters" and "incurable romanticism". This production then went to Sheffield and Bristol. The text was also published in an anthology, The Plays of J.B. Priestley. A 1957 revival by the Caryl Jenner Mobile Theatre was performed at Southwold in the summer before touring the UK during the autumn; among the places it visited were Grantham, Billingham on 4 December 1957, Newport and Cowes on the Isle of Wight, Berwick-upon-Tweed on 30 November 1957 and Alfreton on 7 December 1957. The following year, it was revived again (with the setting moved forward to 1985) by the Castle Theatre, Farnham; this production then went to Reading, in a production described by the Reading Mercury as "a thought-provoking play, well performed by a competent cast and certainly deserving of better support than it obtained on opening night" and finally to Canterbury.

In 1976 the play was revived by the Masqueraders Theatre Club and performed in Sudbury, London from 20–22 May that year, with its setting now advanced to 1999. However, the play generally remained in near-total obscurity until it was revived by the BBC in a production, retaining its original 1975 setting, in BBC2's Performance series – the last major series of studio plays broadcast in the UK – on 26 November 1994, during the year of Priestley's centenary. This production starred John Gielgud as Stephen Dawlish (more than 60 years after he had played on stage and screen as Inigo Jollifant in Priestley's The Good Companions) and also featured Rosemary Harris, Paul Bhattacharjee, Mike McShane, Saskia Reeves, Paul Rhys, Terence Rigby and Emily Watson. This was well received by Lynne Truss in The Times who wrote, "preposterous is how it sounds, but amazingly Saturday's production by Christopher Morahan was magical enough to carry it off", also mentioning that in the play Shrewsbury has become the largest settlement in Britain. Sean Day-Lewis, previewing the production in the previous weekend's Sunday Telegraph, suggested that it was "a work of false prophecy, muddled style and contradictory attitudes" and that its politics were "craven", but also said that it came across with "beguiling effect" and that Gielgud's performance was "among his best for television". Hugh Massingberd, reviewing it in The Daily Telegraph, suggested that "for all his professed socialism, Priestley seemed to be conjuring up an Edwardian's nostalgic vision of a country estate that chimes with the great James Lees-Milne's admirable claim that 'squirearchy was probably the most successful form of local government that's ever been devised'". In The Stage and Television Today, Lisa Rohumma praised Morahan for "manag[ing] to transport us from the often unfulfilling and static world of the television play to a time and place one senses has never really existed" and said that Gielgud was "sage-like and beguiling" and "utterly mesmerising". A further revival – this time on stage – was performed by the Finborough Theatre in 2013, the first Central London production in 64 years, receiving a positive review from Michael Billington in The Guardian.
