= J. H. Morgan =

British lawyer

Brigadier-General J. H. Morgan QC DL
- Born: John Hartman Morgan; 20 March 1876
- Died: 8 April 1955 (aged 79); Royal Wootton Bassett, Wiltshire, United Kingdom
- Occupation: Constitutional lawyer
- Spouse: Margaret Halstan (m. 1905)
- Military career
- Service years: 1914–1923
- Rank: Brigadier-General

Brigadier-General John Hartman Morgan QC DL (20 March 1876 – 8 April 1955) was a British lawyer with expertise in constitutional law. He lectured and wrote on the topic, and he also joined military service during World War I.

== Early life ==
Morgan, born on 20 March 1876 to Reverend David Morgan and his wife Julia Wethli, was educated at Caterham School, the University College of South Wales and Balliol College, Oxford, where he studied modern history. He joined the Inner Temple before becoming part of the literary staff at the Daily Chronicle between 1901 and 1903. After spending time on a research scholarship at the University of Berlin, he became a leader-writer at the Manchester Guardian between 1904 and 1905. He married actress Margaret Halstan on 4 July 1905.

During 1910, Morgan contested the parliamentary seats for Birmingham Edgbaston during the January general election and West Edinburgh during the December general election, both for the Liberal Party.

== Army service ==
Morgan volunteered for military service upon the outbreak of war in 1914 and he was appointed to the adjutant-general's staff. He was an assistant adjutant general with the military section of the British delegation to the Paris Peace Conference of 1919 and the British member on the Prisoners of War Commission in 1919.

Morgan was also employed by the Inter-Allied Military Commission of Control as Deputy Adjutant-General in Berlin from 1919 to 1923. Here he witnessed German attempts to build up their army contrary to the terms of the Treaty of Versailles. He published his findings in October 1924 in the Quarterly Review, titled "The Disarmament of Germany and After". In reply to the German Rhodes scholar at Oxford University, Adolf Schlepegrell, who claimed in October 1933 that Germany had fulfilled the disarmament clauses of the Versailles Treaty, Morgan wrote to The Times: "Germany never disarmed, never intended to disarm, and for seven years did everything in her power to obstruct, deceive, and 'counter-control' the Commission whose duty it was to disarm her".

In a speech to the House of Commons on 9 May 1940, David Lloyd George claimed that Germany by 1931 was "completely disarmed" and that "we had the certificate of the ambassadors to say that disarmament was completed, but in spite of that, we did not carry out our part" in disarming. Morgan wrote to the Daily Telegraph on 14 May, stating that no such certificate was issued and that "the democratic' Government of Germany did not disarm". He further claimed that the commission was withdrawn as 'the price for Germany's signature to the Treaty of Locarno and upon the acceptance of their pledge to disarm: "Those pledges were never kept. Within two years of our withdrawal the Army Estimates of the "democratic" German Government went up by leaps and bounds to an unprecedented degree". Morgan asserted that: "If any one English statesman is to be held responsible for German rearmament it is Mr. Lloyd George" because of his government's repeated assurances during 1921–22 that Germany had carried out the disarmament clauses (including the limitation of her army to 100,000) despite being informed by the senior British officer in Berlin that the number of men being trained by the army during 1920–23 was 500,000. Morgan concluded:

I have in front of me a copy of the Neue Illustrierte Zeitung of 12 September 1935, saluting with a glowing eulogy that Scharnhorst of the Treaty of Versailles, Gen. von Seeckt...for having so successfully obstructed the attempts of the Allied Control Commission to disarm Germany during the years 1920–1926 that he had thereby "prepared the way" (vorbereitet) for Hitler's rapid restoration of the military might of Germany in all its menace. During the "close season" of German rearmament which followed on the withdrawal of the Control Commission Mr. Lloyd George persisted in proclaiming to the world the innocuous character of Germany's "tiny army", as he chose to call it, and insisted that the only menace to the peace of Europe was the defensive measures which, happily for him and for us, the French were taking to meet the covert revival of German militarism.

After World War II he elaborated on this theme in his book Assize of Arms. It was originally intended to be the first of two volumes, but he got round to publishing only the first volume.

He retired from the army in 1923 with the honorary rank of Brigadier-General.

== Later career ==
Whilst serving in the military, Morgan was appointed Professor of Constitutional Law at University College London in 1915. Thomas Baty deputised for him until he retired from the army in 1923; he taught until 1941. In 1916, Morgan was counsel for the defence and appeared as an amicus curiae in the trial for treason of Sir Roger Casement. In 1918, Morgan investigated a case involving Dr. A. M. Low.

Appointed King's Counsel in 1926, Morgan was a legal editor of the Encyclopædia Britannica (14th edition) and a contributor to The Times. Then a reader in constitutional law to the Inns of Court (1926–1936), Rhodes Lecturer at London (1927–1932), counsel to the India Defence League (1933–1934), counsel to the Indian Chamber of Princes (1934–1937), counsel to the Indian State of Gwalior, and Tagore Professor at the University of Calcutta in 1939. Morgan was also a legal adviser to the United Nations War Crimes Commission at Nuremberg from 1947 to 1949. Morgan was appointed a Deputy Lieutenant of Wiltshire in 1931, and he died in the county in Wootton Bassett on 8 April 1955.

Morgan claimed that he coined the famous phrase "Irish history is a thing for Irishmen to forget and for Englishmen to remember",which he said was later used without acknowledgement by Horace Plunkett.

== Publications ==
- — (1910). The House of Lords and the Constitution. London: Methuen & Co.
- — (1912). The New Irish Constitution. London: Hodder and Stoughton.
- The German War Book. Translated by Morgan, J. H. 1915.
- —; Baty, T. (1915). War, its Conduct and Legal Results. London: John Murray.
- — (1915). Germany's Dishonoured Army. The Parliamentary Recruiting Committee.
- — (1916). Leaves from a Field Note-Book. London: Macmillan.
- — (1918). Gentlemen at Arms. London: W. Heinemann.
- — (1924). The Present State of Germany: A Lecture Delivered in the University of London on November 20th, 1923. London: University of London.
- — (1924). John, Viscount Morley. An Appreciation and Some Reminiscences. London: John Murray.
- — (1925). Remedies Against the Crown.
- — (1945). Assize of Arms: The Disarmament of Germany and her Rearmament (1919–1939). London: Methuen & Co.
- — (1948). The Great Assize: An Examination of the Law of the Nuremberg Trials. London: John Murray.
