= If I Were You (Wodehouse novel) =

1931 novel by P. G. Wodehouse

- First edition (US)
- Author: P. G. Wodehouse
- Language: English
- Genre: Comic novel
- Publisher: Doubleday, Doran (US); Herbert Jenkins (UK)
- Publication date: 3 September 1931 (US); 25 September 1931 (UK)
- Publication place: United States
- Media type: Print

If I Were You is a novel by P. G. Wodehouse, first published in the United States on 3 September 1931 by Doubleday, Doran, New York, and in the United Kingdom on 25 September 1931 by Herbert Jenkins, London.

The novel was based on a play of the same name written by Wodehouse and Guy Bolton.

The story concerns the romantic troubles of young Tony, fifth Earl of Droitwich. Engaged to be married to the beautiful and rich Violet Waddington, Tony finds his life thrown into chaos when his old nurse comes to pay him a visit, revealing a long-kept family secret. Tony departs for London with the resourceful Polly Brown, leaving the ancestral home in the hands of the Socialist barber Syd Price.

The Honourable Freddie Chalk-Marshall, the monocle-wearing younger brother of Lord Droitwich, and Freddie's friend Tubby, Lord Bridgnorth, are both members of the Drones Club.

== Plot ==
Anthony "Tony", fifth Earl of Droitwich, lives at his Worcestershire country house Langley End with his brother the Honourable Frederick "Freddie" Chalk-Marshall, their aunt Lady Lydia Bassinger, and her husband Sir Herbert Bassinger. Tony is engaged to Violet Waddington. The match was essentially arranged by Lady Lydia and Violet's father G. G. Waddington, of Waddington's 97 Soups, for Violet's money and Tony's title. Violet likewise views the engagement in a businesslike way, though Tony is unaware Violet does not love him until Freddie tells him. Bella Price, Tony's old nurse and sister of Tony's butler Theodore Slingsby, visits with her son, Socialist barber shop owner Sydney "Syd" Price, and one of Syd's employees, American manicurist Polly Brown. Freddie wants capital to sell Syd's hair regrowth lotion, Price's Derma Vitalis, invented by Syd's grandfather. Tony notices that Syd resembles the portrait of one of Tony's ancestors. Syd is disrespectful and does not get along with Slingsby. Polly explores the house's grounds and pops out of the bushes suddenly in front of Tony's car; he slams on the brakes, though she is still hit. He carries her into the house, but she is not seriously injured and recovers quickly.

Mrs. Price is emotional and reveals the truth about Tony and Syd: she switched them while they were babies. She first confessed twelve years prior, when Tony was sixteen, and at that time, the fourth Earl of Droitwich and Sir Herbert decided to keep it secret. Tony feels Syd is the rightful Lord Droitwich, but his relatives dislike the uncouth Syd and want to keep things as they are. Polly believes Syd is devoted to his business and would not be happy being an earl. Tony and his family try to pay Syd to relinquish any claim to the title, but Syd refuses. Polly suggests they train Syd to become Lord Droitwich because he will hate it and quit. The family agrees and plans to make things uncomfortable for Syd by making him go riding, attend classical concerts, and so on. Tony is impressed with Polly's ingenuity. He gives Syd the keys to Langley End and his London house, and takes the keys to Syd's barber shop.

Two weeks later, Tony's family and Syd are in London. Freddie's friend "Tubby", Lord Bridgnorth, goes to his usual barber shop, Price's Hygienic Toilet Saloon, off the Brompton Road. A barber named George Christopher Meech informs him a man named Anthony is taking over the shop from Syd. Bridgnorth is engaged to a Luella Beamish, whose father is rich and also bald, so Freddie leaves with Bridgnorth to see Mr. Beamish about Price's hair tonic. Syd visits the barber shop. When Freddie returns in need of a shave, Syd is eager to do the job, but is shortly told by Tony's family to go riding, which Syd hates. Tony takes pity on Syd and admits he does not have to do such tasks, but Syd does not believe him. Violet does not wish to marry a barber and will leave Tony if he tells Syd the truth again. Tony and Polly confess their feelings for each other. Syd returns to the shop disheveled from riding, and is ready to take money to give up his claim on the title, but Tony tells him he can be an earl without riding or concerts. Syd now believes Tony. Yet Violet does not end her engagement to Tony, because Mrs. Price, feeling Syd was happier in his shop, has signed a paper for Sir Herbert denying her story about switching Tony and Syd. Tony burns the paper to end his engagement to Violet.

Another two weeks pass. Tony, now engaged to Polly, is summoned to Langley End by Herbert, who has the family solicitor, J. G. Wetherby, interrogate Mrs. Price. Wetherby suggests she has read too many stories involving the changing of one baby for another and nearly convinces her to sign a paper similar to the one Tony burned, but Mrs. Price is superstitious and stops when she sees a magpie. Syd decides to move the painting that resembles him to keep it safe from Tony's plotting family, and tells footman Charles to bring a ladder. A brawl breaks out as Syd and Slingsby fight over the ladder. However, Freddie announces that Mr. Beamish, who has seen results after using Price's Derma Vitalis, wants to sell it. Mr. Price will be very wealthy, with Freddie earning a commission. Mrs. Price now signs the paper at Syd's urging, ensuring Tony will retain his title.

== Publication history ==
Being based on a play, the novel has an apparent three-act structure, with the first and third acts (ch. 1–10 and 21–25) taking place in the drawing room of the county house, and the second (ch. 11–20) in Price's barber shop.

The story was serialised in The American Magazine (US) between April and July 1931, and in the Daily Mail (UK) from 5 June to 3 July 1931. Both of these serial versions are slightly shorter than the novel. The American Magazine serial was published monthly in four parts, and the Daily Mail serial was published daily in 25 parts. The story was illustrated by Frederick Chapman in the American Magazine.

The dust jacket of the first US edition was illustrated by Henrietta Starrett, and the dust jacket of the first UK edition was illustrated by W. Heath Robinson. The US edition of the book is dedicated "To Guy Bolton", who wrote the original play with Wodehouse.

== Adaptations ==
The play that the novel was adapted from was published in book form but not produced. Wodehouse and Bolton later adapted a new play from the novel under the title Who's Who?, which premiered at the Duke of York's Theatre, London, on 20 September 1934. The play was produced by Lawrence Grossmith, who portrayed Freddie Chalk-Marshall in the play. The cast also included Peter Haddon as Tony, Lilian Bond as Polly Brown, Ivor Barnard as Syd Price, Laura Wright as Mrs Price, Violet Vanbrugh as Lady Lydia Bassinger, Morton Selten as Sir Herbert Bassinger, Sebastian Smith as Slingsby, Enid Stamp Taylor as Violet Might, and Charles Quatermaine as J. B. Might. Who's Who? ran for 19 performances.

In 1938, the novel was adapted for radio by Jack Inglis. The radio drama featured Billy Milton as Anthony, fifth Earl of Droitwich, Elliot Playfair as the Hon. Freddie Chalk-Marshall, Margaret Halstan as Lady Lydia, Gordon McLeod as Sir Herbert, Gladys Young as Mrs Price, Bryan Powley as Slingsby, Edwin Ellis as Syd Price, Carleton Hobbs as Meech, and Eileen Erskine as Polly Brown.

Bolton adapted the play as a musical, Who's Who, Baby?, with music and lyrics by Johnny Brandon. It opened at The Players Theatre, New York, on 29 January 1968, and ran for 16 performances.
