= The Moonraker (play) =

1952 play

- Original language: English
- Written by: Arthur Watkyn
- Genre: Historical
- Setting: Devon, 1651

Premiere
- Date: 28 January 1952
- Place: Arts Theatre, Cambridge

The Moonraker is a historical play by the British writer Arthur Watkyn. It premiered at the Cambridge Arts Theatre and in June 1952 had a brief run at the Saville Theatre in London's West End. The cast included Jean Kent, Griffith Jones, Henry Oscar, Paul Whitsun-Jones, William Moore and Julian Somers. It was directed by Terence De Marney.

== Film adaptation ==
The film rights were quickly acquired by Associated British, but a plan to produce it with Audrey Hepburn fell through and the project was put on hold for several years. In 1958 the studio produced The Moonraker directed by David MacDonald and starring George Baker, Sylvia Syms and Marius Goring.

== Bibliography ==
- Goble, Alan. The Complete Index to Literary Sources in Film. Walter de Gruyter, 1999.
- Wearing, J.P. The London Stage 1950-1959: A Calendar of Productions, Performers, and Personnel. Rowman & Littlefield, 2014.
