= Paul Whitsun-Jones =

Welsh actor (1923–1974)

- Born: 25 April 1923; Newport, Monmouthshire, Wales, UK
- Died: 14 January 1974 (aged 50); London, England, UK
- Occupation: Actor
- Years active: 1953–1974
- Spouse(s): Joyce W. Rankine (m. 1949, divorced) Sylvia E. Horswell (m. 1962)
- Children: 4

Paul Whitsun-Jones (25 April 1923 – 14 January 1974) was a British character actor.

Born in Newport in Monmouthshire, he was educated at Merchant Taylors' School in Northwood in Middlesex. He started his acting career in 1948 with two years at York Repertory Theatre. In the West End he appeared in The Moonraker at the Saville Theatre (1952), Dangerous Curves at the Garrick Theatre (1953), and played the Wazir in Kismet at the Stoll Theatre for two years from 1955 to 1957.

His early television appearances included Street Scene, The Last Tycoon, Love from Italy, Berkeley Square and Swedish Match King; he had a prominent part as journalist James Fullalove in the BBC science fiction serial The Quatermass Experiment. He played the role of Mr. Bumble in the original West End production of the musical Oliver! (1960). He appeared in two Doctor Who stories: as Squire Edwards in The Smugglers (1966) and the Marshal of Solos in The Mutants (1972). He gave two performances in the episodes A Cellar Full of Silence and Death on Reflection in the series Department S (1968/69).

== Personal life and death ==
Whitsun-Jones had two children by his first wife, Joyce Winifred Rankine, whom he married in 1949 and later divorced, and two from his second wife, Sylvia E. Horswell, including the actress Henrietta Whitsun-Jones. He died of appendicitis in London in 1974 aged 50.

== Filmography ==
Title	Year	Role	Note
The Diamond	1954	Ballistics Technician	Uncredited
The Passing Stranger	1954	Lloyd	
The Constant Husband	1955	Welsh Farmer	Uncredited
Stock Car	1955	Turk McNeil	
The Moonraker	1958	Parfitt	
Next to No Time	1958	Lord	
Room at the Top	1959	Man at Bar	
Wrong Number	1959	Cyril	
The Shakedown	1960	Fat Drinker	
Let's Get Married	1960	Uncle Herbert	
Bluebeards Ten Honeymoons	1960	Station Master	
There Was a Crooked Man	1960	Restaurant Gentleman	
The Boy Who Stole a Million	1960	Desk Sergeant	
Tunes of Glory	1960	Major 'Dusty' Miller	
Candidate for Murder	1962	Phillips	Edgar Wallace Mysteries
Doctor in Distress	1963	Grimes	
The Masque of the Red Death	1964	Scarlatti	
Dead Man's Chest	1965	Chef	Edgar Wallace Mysteries
The Wild Affair	1965	Tiny Hearst	
Life at the Top	1965	Keatley	
What's Good for the Goose	1969	Clark	
Simon, Simon	1970	The Boss	Short
All the Right Noises	1971	Mr. Melchum	
Dr. Jekyll and Sister Hyde	1971	Sergeant Danvers	
The Magnificent Seven Deadly Sins	1971	Elsinore	(segment "Avarice")
A Christmas Carol	1971	Mr. Fezziwig (voice)	
Assassin	1973	Drunk Man	
Keep It Up, Jack	1973	Mr. Fairbrother	(final film role)

== Television ==
Title	Year	Role	Notes
The Quatermass Experiment	1953	James Fullalove	6 episodes
Dear Dotty	1954	Butch	1 episode
Bonehead	1960-1962	Boss	
Edgar Wallace Mysteries	1962	Charles Pinder	Episode: "The £20,000 Kiss"
Z-Cars	1962–1963	Donald Patterson / Stan Riley	2 episodes
The Saint	1962–1964	Domenick Naccaro / Sebastian Ibanez / Vic Lazaroff / ...	4 episodes
The Avengers	1963–1969	Charles / Sanders / Chessman	4 episodes
King of the River	1966	Mr. Jones	Episode: "Susanna Goes Fishing"
United!	1966	Arnold Wilson	1 episode
Doctor Who	1966, 1972	Squire Edwards / The Marshal of Solos	The Smugglers / The Mutants
Wild, Wild Women	1969	Mr. Harcourt	6 episodes
Department S	1969	Gresford / Martin Kyle	2 episodes
Up Pompeii!	1970	Nefarius	Episode: "Exodus"
The Goodies	1970	Deputy Commissioner Butcher	Episode: "Love the Police"
The Persuaders!	1971	Inspector Blanchard	Episode: "Powerswitch"
Follyfoot	1973	Fat Man	Episode: "The Helping Hand"
Some Mothers Do 'Ave 'Em	1973		
