= A Mission for Mr. Dodd =

1964 film

- Directed by: Günter Gräwert
- Written by: Claus Hardt; Utz Utermann
- Based on: Out of Bounds by Arthur Watkyn
- Starring: Heinz Rühmann; Maria Sebaldt; Robert Graf
- Cinematography: Erich Claunigk
- Music by: Franz Grothe
- Production company: Divina-Film
- Distributed by: Gloria Film
- Release date: 14 February 1964
- Running time: 98 minutes
- Country: West Germany
- Language: German

A Mission for Mr. Dodd (German: Vorsicht Mister Dodd) is a 1964 West German comedy film directed by Günter Gräwert and starring Heinz Rühmann, Maria Sebaldt and Robert Graf. It was shot at the Bavaria Studios in Munich. The film's sets were designed by the art directors Willy Schatz and Robert Stratil. It is based on the 1962 hit West End play Out of Bounds by Arthur Watkyn.

== Synopsis ==
In order to penetrate a ring of East European agents who have been stealing military secrets, British intelligence recruits a headmaster who is the exact doppelganger of one of the foreign spies to take his place at a meeting. Soon he is deeply caught up in the dangerous game of espionage.

== Cast ==
- Heinz Rühmann as Dr. Lancelot Dodd / Dr. Ivor Marmion
- Maria Sebaldt as Mrs. Parker
- Robert Graf as Toni
- Anton Diffring as Howard
- Ernst Fritz Fürbringer as Sir Gerald Blythe
- Erika von Thellmann as Mrs. Davis
- Horst Keitel as Purdie
- Rudolf Rhomberg as Glenville
- Harry Wüstenhagen as Mr. Bland
- Mario Adorf as Buddy Herman
- Erik Jelde as Hornblow
- Heinz Schorlemmer as Bentley
- Ah Yue Lou as Al Miller
- Edgar Engelmann as Barman
- Rene Frank as Tommy Blythe

== Bibliography ==
- Bock, Hans-Michael & Bergfelder, Tim. The Concise Cinegraph: Encyclopaedia of German Cinema. Berghahn Books, 2009.
