= Margaret Halstan =

British actress (1879–1967)

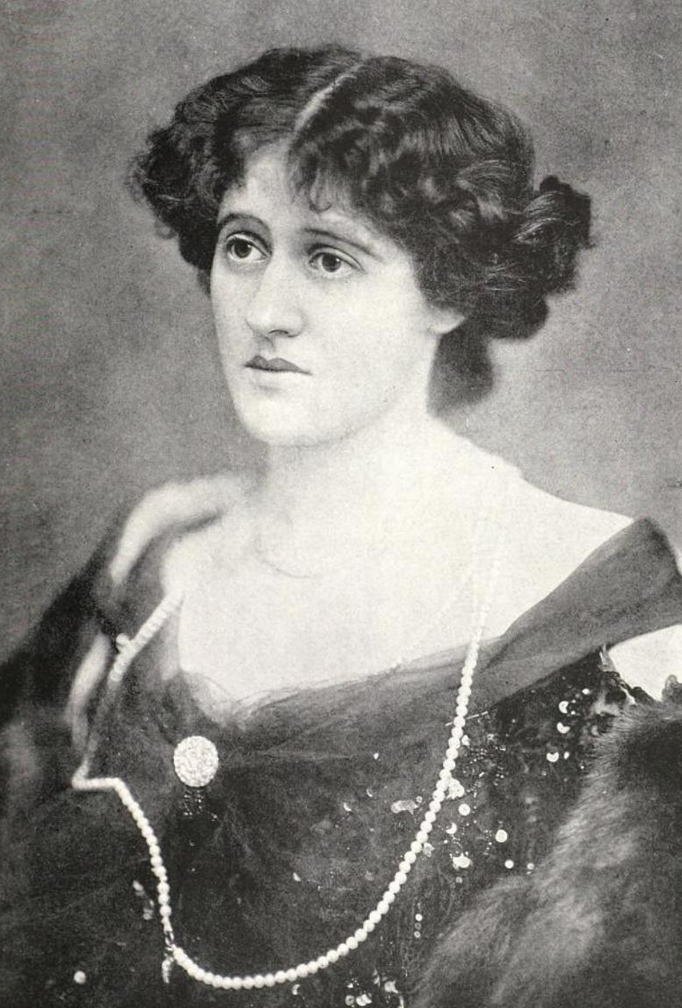
- Margaret Halstan, from a 1904 publication
- Born: Clara Maud Hertz; 25 December 1879; Hornchurch, London
- Died: 8 January 1967 (aged 87); London
- Occupation: Actress
- Years active: 1895-1963
- Spouse: John Hartman Morgan (m. 1905; died 1955)

Margaret Halstan (25 December 1879 – 8 January 1967) was a British stage and screen actress, who often played upper-class ladies of the gentry, with a career spanning over six decades.

She was particularly known for her Shakespearian roles, and it has been stated she appeared in every one of his plays, she was particularly noted for her role in Othello as Desdemona, she made her professional debut in 1895.

At the turn of the century she joined Sir Frank Benson's theatre company, and also played in the theatrical companies of Sir George Alexander and Sir Herbert Beerbohm Tree, before making her debut in silent films in 1916.

== Biography ==
Halstan was born Clara Maud Hertz in London, England on Christmas Day 1879, of apparently Jewish descent. and later used the professional stage name Margaret Halstan. Her parents were Henry Anthony Hertz and his wife Elizabeth Maud.

Before becoming a professional actor, Halstan performed as an amateur with the Strolling players and the Bancroft Amateur Dramatic Society. She performed in a show titled Beethoven's Romance at the Royalty Theatre on 1 December 1894.

Halstan made her professional West End stage debut at the Haymarket Theatre on 30 October 1895, as a walk-on in Trilby. She was fluent in English, German, and French, and performed on stage in all three languages. Halstan also acted in BBC radio productions such as the 1938 radio adaptation of the novel If I Were You, and the 1940 radio adaptation of the short story "Lord Arthur Savile's Crime".

She made the easy transition to film roles debuting in the 1916 silent A Bunch of Violets and subsequently appearing in sound pictures.

She also played the elderly aunt Lydia, who comes to visit her family in Norfolk at Christmas, in the seasonal feature The Holy and the Ivy, in 1952 starring Ralph Richardson and was one of two actors to have also played the stage version in 1950.

== Personal life ==
Halstan married lawyer John Hartman Morgan in 1905.

== Theatre ==
Show	Dates	Theatre	Role	Ref(s)
Antony and Cleopatra	24 May – 5 June 1897	Olympic Theatre	Octavia	
My "Soldier" Boy	3 January – 18 March 1899	Criterion Theatre	Geraldine	
Nicolette	3 January – 18 March 1899	Criterion Theatre	Héléne	
You Never Can Tell	26 November 1899	Royalty Theatre	Gloria Clandon	
The Wisdom of the Wise	22 November 1900 – 12 January 1901	St James's Theatre	Mrs. Tommie Bistern	
Das große Licht	16 December – 22 December 1902	Great Queen Street Theatre	Charlotte Eggers	
The Good Hope	26–27 April 1903	Imperial Theatre	Jo	
Ina	15–17 May 1904	Royal Court Theatre	Ina	
Othello	12 January 1907	Queen’s Theatre, Manchester	Desdemona	
The Rights of the Soul	21–22 February 1909	Kingsway Theatre	Anna	
What the Public Wants	2 May – 26 June 1909	Aldwych Theatre and Royalty Theatre	Emily Vernon	
Twelfth Night	8 January 1910	Queen’s Theatre, Manchester	Viola	
A Fool There Was	21 March – 13 May 1911	Queen’s Theatre and Aldwych Theatre	The Wife	
Arms and the Man	18 May – 1 July 1911	Criterion Theatre	Raina	
The Man of Destiny	28 January 1912	Savoy Theatre	Strange Lady	
The Gold Thread	7 November 1912	Royal Court Theatre, London	Mrs. Innes	
A Scrap of Paper	16 June – 25 July 1914	Criterion Theatre	Lucy, Lady Icebrook	
The Stormy Petrel	30 September – 9 October 1915	Criterion Theatre	Frances Weir	
As You Like It	24 January 1916	Queen’s Theatre, Manchester	Rosalind	
Where Is He?	4 September 1916	Gaiety Theatre, Manchester	Marged	
The House of Peril	8 March – 7 June 1919	Queen's Theatre	Anna Wolsky	
Brown Sugar	7 July 1920 – 19 February 1921	Duke of York's Theatre and Garrick Theatre	Lady Honoria Nesbitt	
The Desire for Change	26 October – 14 November 1925	Playhouse Theatre	Countess Sucha	
The Blue Kitten	23 December 1925 – 24 April 1926	Gaiety Theatre, London and London Pavilion	Mme Lucile Popp	
The Lady-in-Law	29 September – 12 November 1927	Wyndham's Theatre	Magda Kramsen	
Wooden Shoes	13 November – 13 December 1930	Kingsway Theatre	Trine Krebs	
The Young Idea	31 August – 24 October 1931	St Martin's Theatre	Julia Craigworthy	
The Admirable Crichton	28 October – 23 December 1943	His Majesty's Theatre, London	Countess of Brocklehurst	
The Dark Lady of the Sonnets	28 November 1944 – 17 January 1945	Lyric Theatre, Hammersmith	The Lady	
Pygmalion	12 December 1944 – 20 January 1945	Lyric Theatre, Hammersmith	Mrs. Higgins	
The Holly and the Ivy	28 March – 29 April 1950	Lyric Theatre, Hammersmith	Aunt Lydia	
The Holly and the Ivy	10 May 1950 – 5 May 1951	Duchess Theatre	Aunt Lydia	
Indian Summer	12 December – 29 December 1951	Criterion Theatre	Muriel Petersham	
The Children's Hour	19 September – 28 October 1956	Arts Theatre	Amelia Tilford	
My Fair Lady	30 April 1958 – 19 October 1963	Theatre Royal, Drury Lane	Queen of Transylvania	

== Filmography ==
Year	Title	Role	Notes
1916	A Bunch of Violets	Lady Marchant	
1917	Profit and the Loss	Unknown role	
1922	Tell Your Children	Lady Sybil Edwards	
1922	Brown Sugar	Honoria Nesbitt	Performed the same role in the 1920 play
1930	The Middle Watch	Lady Agatha Hewitt	
1931	The Beggar Student	Countess Novalska	
1935	Drake of England	Lady Sydenham	
1940	Old Mother Riley in Society	Duchess	
1941	Quiet Wedding	Lady Yeldham	
1942	The Black Sheep of Whitehall	Matron	
1952	The Holly and the Ivy	Aunt Lydia	Performed the same role in the 1950 play
1953	Blood Orange	Lady Marchant	
1955	Touch and Go	Mrs. Pritchett	
