= Robert Vansittart, 1st Baron Vansittart =

British diplomat (1881–1957)

The Right Honourable The Lord Vansittart GCB GCMG MVO PC
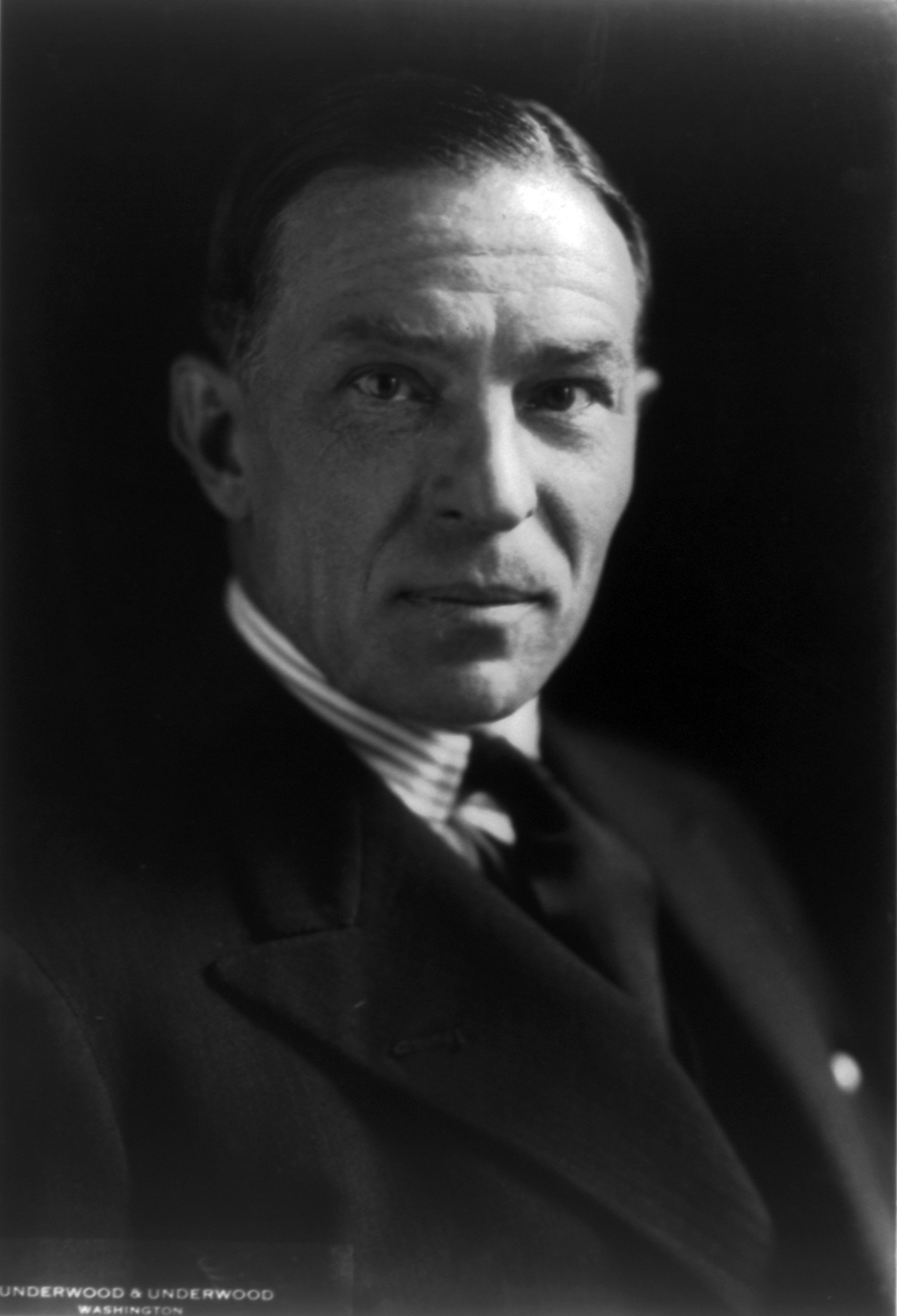
- Vansittart in 1929

Permanent Under-Secretary of State for Foreign Affairs
- In office 1930–1938
- Preceded by: Sir Ronald Lindsay
- Succeeded by: Sir Alexander Cadogan

Principal Private Secretary to the Prime Minister
- In office 1928–1930

Personal details
- Born: 25 June 1881 Wilton House, Farnham, Surrey, England
- Died: 14 February 1957 (aged 75) Denham Place, Denham, Buckinghamshire, England
- Spouse(s): Gladys Heppenheimer (died 1928); Sarita Enriqueta Ward
- Children: 1

Robert Gilbert Vansittart, 1st Baron Vansittart, GCB, GCMG, MVO, PC (25 June 1881 – 14 February 1957), known as Sir Robert Vansittart between 1929 and 1941, was a senior British diplomat in the period before and during the Second World War. He was Principal Private Secretary to the Prime Minister from 1928 to 1930 and Permanent Under-Secretary at the Foreign Office from 1930 to 1938 and later served as Chief Diplomatic Adviser to the British Government. He is best remembered for his opposition to appeasement and his strong stance against Germany both during and after the Second World War. His 1941 book, Black Record: Germans Past and Present, led to the coining of the term Vansittartism, a doctrine holding that Germans were incorrigibly violent and militaristic throughout their history. Vansittart was also a published poet, novelist and playwright.

== Background and education ==
Vansittart was born at Wilton House, Farnham, Surrey, the eldest of the three sons of Robert Arnold Vansittart, of Foots Cray Place, Kent, a captain in the 7th Dragoon Guards, by his wife Susan Alice Blane, third daughter of Gilbert James Blane, landowner, of Foliejon Park, Berkshire. His younger brother Guy Nicholas (Nick) Vansittart had a successful career with General Motors before and after the war. He was recruited into "Z" Network during the 1930s and served in Special Operations Executive during World War II.

Agnatically (patrilineally) the family is of Dutch descent; ancestors included Arthur Vansittart, Member of Parliament (MP) for Windsor, and the colonel of the same name, MP for Berkshire. Henry Vansittart, Robert Vansittart and Lord Bexley were in the other branches. A female-line ancestor was Lord Auckland. Vansittart was also a second cousin of T. E. Lawrence (better known as Lawrence of Arabia).

Widely nicknamed Van, he was educated at St Neot's Preparatory School and Eton College, where he was a member of the exclusive Eton Society (also called Pop) and Captain of the Oppidans. He then travelled in Europe for two years to improve his French and German, where his experiences and study of the political systems prevailing may have contributed to his Germanophobia and Francophilia.

He appeared to have stepped out of an earlier age, with a lavish lifestyle funded by his wealthy wife, a large house in Mayfair, and a magnificent country house in Denham. As a young attaché in Paris, he wrote a play in French which was performed at the prestigious Theatre Molière for six weeks.

== Diplomatic career ==
Vansittart entered the Foreign Office in 1902, starting as a clerk in the Eastern Department, where he was a specialist on Aegean Islands affairs. He was an attaché at the British Embassy in Paris between 1903 and 1905, when he became Third Secretary. He then served at the embassies in Tehran between 1907 and 1909 and Cairo between 1909 and 1911. From 1911, he was attached to the Foreign Office. During the First World War he was joint head of the contraband department and then head of the Prisoner of War Department under Lord Newton. He took part in the Paris Peace Conference and became an Assistant Secretary at the Foreign Office in 1920. From that year to 1924, he was private secretary to the Foreign Secretary, Lord Curzon.

From 1928 to 1930, he was Principal Private Secretary to the Prime Minister, Stanley Baldwin and then Ramsay MacDonald. In January 1930 he was appointed Permanent Under-Secretary at the Foreign Office, where he supervised the work of Britain's diplomatic service.

=== Permanent Under-Secretary of State for Foreign Affairs, 1930–1938 ===
Vansittart was suspicious of Adolf Hitler from the start and claimed that what Hitler said was "for foreign consumption". He thought Hitler would start another European war as soon as he "felt strong enough".

Vansittart supported revising the Versailles Treaty in Germany's favour but only after Hitler was no longer in power. Vansittart believed that Britain should be firm with Germany, with an alliance between France and the Soviet Union against Germany essential. Vansittart also urgently advocated rearmament.

In the summer of 1936, Vansittart visited Germany and claimed that he found a climate that "the ghost of Barthou would hardly have recognised" and that Britain should negotiate with Germany. He thought that satisfying Hitler's "land hunger" at Soviet expense would be immoral and regarded the Franco-Soviet Treaty of Mutual Assistance as non-negotiable. It was because he believed that Germany had gained equality in Europe that Vansittart favoured facilitating German expansion in Africa. He thought that Hitler was exploiting fears of a "Bolshevist menace" as a cover for "expansion in Central and South-Eastern Europe".

Like Sir Maurice Hankey, Vansittart thought in power politics terms. He thought Hitler could not decide whether to follow Joseph Goebbels and Alfred von Tirpitz in viewing Britain as "the ultimate enemy" or on the other hand adopting the Joachim von Ribbentrop policy of appeasing Britain in order to engage in military expansion in the East.

Vansittart thought that in either case time should be "bought for rearmament" by an economic agreement with Germany and by appeasing every "genuine grievance" about colonies. Vansittart wanted to detach Benito Mussolini from Hitler and thought that the British Empire was an "Incubus" and that Continental Europe was the central British national interest, but he doubted whether agreement could be had there. That was because he feared that German attention, if turned eastwards, would result in a military empire between the Baltic Sea, the Adriatic Sea and the Black Sea.

At the Foreign Office in the 1930s, Vansittart was a major figure in the loose group of officials and politicians opposed to appeasement of Germany. Eden and Vansittart had already clashed during the Abyssinia Crisis with Eden supporting sanctions against Italy while Vansittart wanted Italy as an ally against Germany. Vansittart argued that there was no prospect of a "general settlement" with Hitler, and the best that could be done was to strengthen ties with the French in order to confront Germany. Vansittart had supported Eden's efforts to defuse the Rhineland crisis as British rearmament had only just begun, but Vansittart urged the government to use the crisis as a chance to begin forming a military alliance with France against Germany. By the spring of 1936, Vansittart had become convinced that a "general settlement" with Germany was not possible. A Foreign Office official Owen O'Malley suggested that Britain give Germany a "free hand in the East" (i.e. accept the German conquest of all Eastern Europe) in exchange for a German promise to accept the status quo in Western Europe. Vansittart wrote in response that Hitler was seeking world conquest, and that to allow Germany to conquer all of Eastern Europe would give the Reich sufficient raw materials to make Germany immune to a British blockade, which would then allow the Germans to overrun Western Europe. Vansittart commented that to allow Germany to conquer Eastern Europe would "lead to the disappearance of liberty and democracy in Europe". By contrast, Eden saw British interests as confined only to Western Europe, and did not share Vansittart's beliefs about what Hitler's ultimate intentions might be.

In spite of his harsh opposition to appeasement with Germany, Vansittart had been on "very friendly terms with Herr (Konrad) Henlein". Henlein was the leader of the Sudeten German Party, which demanded autonomy for the Sudetenland, as was eventually achieved through the Munich Agreement (1938). Vansittart genuinely liked Henlein, the mild-mannered and easy-going gymnastics teacher, and believed in assurances that all he wanted was autonomy for the Sudetenland. Much of Vansittart's later turn towards Germanophobia was provoked by his discovery that Henlein had deceived him.

Vansittart told Henlein that "no serious intervention in favour of the Czechs was to be feared from Great Britain and probably also from France." That reached Hitler in the second half of 1937, when he was deciding about his plan to overthrow Austria and Czechoslovakia; his decisions were not proof of high intuition or intellect but were based on information received indirectly from Vansittart, among other well-placed politicians and officers in Britain, like Lord Lothian, Lord Mount Temple, Oliver Vaughan Gurney Hoare (Sir Samuel Hoare's younger brother) and others. It is not known how much that encouraged Hitler, but he later stated very similar views: "the Führer believed that almost certainly Britain and probably France as well, had already tacitly written off the Czechs and were reconciled to the fact that this question would be cleared up in due course by Germany."

After the war, an effort was made to cover up Vansittart's embarrassing "real friendship" with Henlein.

In the late 1930s, Vansittart together with Reginald Leeper, the Foreign Office's Press Secretary, often leaked information to a private newspaper, The Whitehall Letter, edited by Victor Gordon-Lennox, the anti-appeasement diplomatic editor of the Daily Telegraph.

That brought him into conflict with the political leadership at the time, and he was removed as Permanent Under-Secretary in 1938 into the meaningless role of an advisor (although initially the French and Germans thought it was a promotion). He was out of favour with his former supporter Sir Warren Fisher the head of the civil service and the new head (and confident of Chamberlain and appeaser) Horace Wilson.

A new post as "Chief Diplomatic Adviser to His Majesty's Government" was instead created ad hoc for him in which he served until 1941.

=== Germanophobia ===
Vansittart was also involved in intelligence work. In 1940, Vansittart sued the American historian Harry Elmer Barnes for libel for an article, written by Barnes in 1939, accusing him of then plotting aggression against Germany.

During the war, Vansittart became a prominent advocate of a very anti-German line. His earlier worries about Germany were reformulated into an argument that Germany was intrinsically militaristic and aggressive. In Black Record: Germans Past and Present (1941), Vansittart portrayed Nazism as just the latest manifestation of Germany's continuous record of aggression from the time of the Roman Empire, thus giving rise to the term Vansittartism. Therefore, after Germany was defeated, it must be stripped of all military capacity, including its heavy industries. The German people enthusiastically supported Hitler's wars of aggression, just as they had supported the Franco-Prussian War in 1870 and World War I in 1914. They must be thoroughly re-educated under strict Allied supervision for at least a generation. De-Nazification was not enough. The German military elite was the real cause of war, especially the "Prussianist" officer corps and the German General Staff: both must be destroyed.

In 1943 he wrote:

In the opinion of the author, it is an illusion to differentiate between the German right, centre, or left, or the German Catholics or Protestants, or the German workers or capitalists. They are all alike, and the only hope for a peaceful Europe is a crushing and violent military defeat followed by a couple of generations of re-education controlled by the United Nations.

He also wrote that "the other Germany has never existed save in a small and ineffective minority". On other occasions, he made similar remarks:

We didn't go to war in 1939 to save Germany from Hitler ... or the continent from fascism. Like in 1914 we went to war for the not lesser noble cause that we couldn't accept a German hegemony over Europe.

The British historian R. B. McCallum wrote in 1944: "To some, such as Lord Vansittart, the main problem of policy was to watch Germany and prevent her power reviving. No one can refuse him a tribute for his foresight in this matter."

== Honours ==
Vansittart was appointed a Member of the Royal Victorian Order (MVO) in 1906 on the occasion of the King's visit to Paris and Biarritz, a Companion of the Order of St Michael and St George (CMG) in the 1920 Birthday Honours, a Companion of the Order of the Bath (CB) in the 1927 Birthday Honours, a Knight Commander of the Order of the Bath (KCB) in the 1929 Birthday Honours, a Knight Grand Cross of the Order of St Michael and St George (GCMG) in the 1931 New Year Honours and a Knight Grand Cross of the Order of the Bath (GCB) in the 1938 New Year Honours. He was sworn into the Privy Council in 1940 and raised to the peerage as Baron Vansittart, of Denham in the County of Buckingham on 3 July 1941.

== Literary career ==
Vansittart was also a published poet, novelist and playwright. This is a partial list of his literary works:

=== Plays ===
- Les Pariahs (1902)
- The Cap and Bells: a comedy in three acts (1913)
- Dusk (1914)
- Dead Heat: a comedy in three acts (1939)

=== Novels ===
- The Gates: A Study in Prose (1910)
- John Stuart (1912)
- Pity's Kin (1924)

=== Poetry ===
- Songs & Satires (1909)
- Foolery: a comedy in verse (1912)
- The Singing Caravan, a Sufi Tale (1919)
- Tribute (1926)
- Green and Grey: Collected Poems (1944)

=== History ===
- Black Record: Germans Past and Present (1941)
- Bones of Contention (1945)

=== Autobiography ===
- Lessons of My Life (1943)
- The Mist Procession (1957), Hutchinson & Co. London (published posthumously with a prefatory note by his wife Sarita)

== Film career ==
Vansittart was a close friend of producer Alexander Korda. He helped Korda with the financing of London Films. His barony's territorial designation was of Denham, the parish where London Films had its studio and he owned Denham Place. Vansittart contributed to four motion pictures.

He wrote the screenplay for Wedding Rehearsal (1932), contributed dialogue to Sixty Glorious Years (1938) and, under the pseudonym "Robert Denham", provided song lyrics for Korda's The Thief of Bagdad (1940) and Jungle Book (1942), in collaboration with the noted Hungarian composer Miklós Rózsa with whom he also wrote the concert musical work for voices, "Beast of Burden" (1940).

== Personal life ==
Vansittart married his first wife, Gladys Robinson-Duff (née Heppenheimer), daughter of General William C. Heppenheimer, of the United States, in 1921. They had one daughter, the Honourable Cynthia Vansittart (1922–2023). Gladys died in 1928. He married his second wife, Sarita Enriqueta Ward, daughter of the explorer and sculptor Herbert Ward, of Paris, and widow of Sir Colville Barclay, on 29 July 1931. They lived in London and at Denham Place, Denham, Buckinghamshire. He died in February 1957, age 75, and the barony became extinct.

== Arms ==
Coat of arms of Robert Vansittart, 1st Baron Vansittart
Crest An eagle's head couped at the breast between two wings elevated and displayed Sable the whole resting on two crosses pattée Argent. Escutcheon Ermine an eagle displayed Sable on a chief Gules a ducal coronet Or between two crosses pattée Argent. Supporters On either side a greyhound Argent gorged with a collar flory counter-flory Azure. Motto Fata Viam Invenient

== Notes ==
Diplomatic posts
Preceded by Eric, The Earl of Perth	Principal Private Secretary to the Foreign Secretary; 1920–1924	Succeeded by Sir Walford Selby
Preceded by Hon. Sir Ronald Lindsay	Permanent Under-Secretary for Foreign Affairs; 1930–1938	Succeeded by Hon. Sir Alexander Cadogan
Government offices
Preceded by Sir Ronald D. Waterhouse	Principal Private Secretary to the Prime Minister; 1928–1930	Unknown
Peerage of the United Kingdom
New creation	Baron Vansittart; 1941–1957	Extinct
