= Not in the Book =

1958 play

- Written by: Arthur Watkyn
- Original language: English
- Genre: Comedy
- Setting: Wokenham, a small town outside London, present day

Premiere
- Date premiered: 17 February 1958
- Place premiered: Theatre Royal, Brighton

Not in the Book is a comedy thriller play by the British writer Arthur Watkyn. It was first performed at the Theatre Royal in Brighton before transferring to the Criterion Theatre in London's West End where it ran for 487 performances between 2 April 1958 and 6 June 1959. The original West End cast included Philip Guard, Avice Landone, Martin Wyldeck, Wilfrid Hyde-White, Sydney Tafler, Charles Heslop and Michael Nightingale. It was directed by Nigel Patrick. It subsequently went on tour with Jack Hulbert starring and was translated into several languages. It was adapted several times for television in a variety of countries.

A film version was announced in December 1959 but was not made.

== Synopsis ==
A respectable family man's life is thrown into jeopardy when he is approached by a shady South American who attempts to blackmail him about his misspent youth there. He decides the only way to escape from his predicament is to murder the blackmailer, but things go wrong.

== Bibliography ==
- Carlson, Marvin. Deathtraps: The Postmodern Comedy Thriller. Indiana University Press, 1993.
- Wearing, J.P. The London Stage 1950-1959: A Calendar of Productions, Performers, and Personnel. Rowman & Littlefield, 2014.
