= Kriegsbrauch im Landkriege =

Kriegsbrauch im Landkriege (The Usages of War on Land) was a war conduct manual written by the General Staff of the German Army in 1902. Christian Meurer, one of Germany's foremost international lawyers, said in 1907 that the book was the authoritative statement of the laws of war by the organisation responsible for conduct in wartime.

The book claimed that during the nineteenth century attempts to regulate warfare had "completely failed":

But since the tendency of thought of the last century was dominated essentially by humanitarian considerations which not infrequently degenerated into sentimentality and flabby emotion there have not been wanting attempts to influence the development of the usages of war in a way which was in fundamental contradiction with the nature of war and its object.

Therefore, the German officer had to "guard himself against excessive humanitarian notions" in order to learn that "certain severities are indispensable to war, nay more, that the only true humanity very often lies in a ruthless application of them".

Brigadier-General J. H. Morgan translated the book into English and it was published by John Murray in January 1915.

== Editions ==
- The German War Book (London: John Murray, 1915).
