= The Holly and the Ivy (film) =

1952 British film by George More O'Ferrall

- Original Australian film poster
- Directed by: George More O'Ferrall
- Written by: Wynyard Browne; Anatole de Grunwald
- Based on: The Holly and the Ivy; 1950 play by Wynyard Browne
- Produced by: Anatole de Grunwald
- Starring: Ralph Richardson; Celia Johnson; Margaret Leighton
- Cinematography: Edward Scaife
- Edited by: Bert Bates
- Music by: Malcolm Arnold
- Color process: Black and white
- Production company: London Films
- Distributed by: British Lion Films
- Release dates: 22 December 1952 (UK); 4 February 1954 (U.S.)
- Running time: 83 minutes (UK) (Note: As of 2019 release of Blu-ray from StudioCanal UK (and also the one from Kino Lorber in US) runs about 80 mins, 2 scenes are missing.); 80 minutes (U.S.)
- Country: United Kingdom
- Language: English
- Box office: £110,540 (UK)

The Holly and the Ivy is a 1952 British drama film directed by George More O'Ferrall and starring Ralph Richardson, Celia Johnson, and Margaret Leighton. It was adapted from the 1950 play of the same name by Wynyard Browne. Produced by Anatole de Grunwald and co-scripted by Browne and de Grunwald it was distributed by British Lion Films, and released in the United States in 1954 by the independent Pacemaker Pictures. An Irish clergyman whose neglect of his grown offspring, in his zeal to tend to his parishioners, comes to the surface at a Christmas family gathering.

Actresses Margaret Halstan and Maureen Delany reprised their roles from the stage.

== Plot ==
It is traditional for the widespread Gregory family to return home for Christmas at the parsonage in the remote village of Wyndenham in rural Norfolk. The film opens with introductions of each family member save for younger, fashionista daughter Margaret, who is for much of the first half an unseen character. The plot centres on the situation of Jenny, who is housekeeper for her aged parent Martin. He is the village parson and apparently cares much more about his parishioners than his family. Jenny wishes to marry engineer David, who is bound for South America for five years, but she cannot leave her father unless her sister or her aunt agrees to look after Martin.

Tensions arise after the family assembles. The catalyst is Martin's son Michael, who has developed strong resentment towards religion and his father's plans to send him to university after he has completed his national service in the Royal Artillery. Margaret arrives late and clarifies to Jenny that she has no intention of staying or of giving up her life as a magazine writer in London. It soon transpires that Margaret is becoming an alcoholic and, in separate discussions with Jenny and Michael, she reveals that she has been an unmarried mother but that her four-year-old son has recently died of meningitis, driving her into her present reliance on alcohol. The underlying problem facing all three siblings is that they cannot approach their father about anything unconventional, as they believe him to be uprightly religious and more likely to disapprove of their respective situations than to show kindness and understanding.

Regardless of their father's perceived feelings, Margaret and Michael decide they do not want to be with him and their two aunts on Christmas Eve and go out, ostensibly to the cinema. In fact, Margaret wants to go to the pub and they both end up drunk, resulting in a scene when they return to the house. On Christmas morning, Margaret announces that she is leaving immediately, and Michael argues with Martin to the point of questioning the existence of God. Margaret has also become an atheist.

It emerges that Martin is not a tyrannical parent or judgmentally religious after all. He is very understanding of their problems because he has helped people with similar issues throughout his career and even wrestled with similar ones on the way to discovering his religious vocation. In individual heart-to-hearts with Michael and Margaret just before the Christmas morning service, he also expresses his regret and disappointment that they consider him unapproachable. All is thus resolved, with Michael relenting over university and Margaret agreeing to turn her back on the London life she secretly hates to live with Martin, which will allow Jenny to marry David and go to South America. The entire family is in harmony at church as the morning service begins.

== Cast ==
- Ralph Richardson as Reverend Martin Gregory
- Celia Johnson as Jenny Gregory
- Margaret Leighton as Margaret Gregory
- Denholm Elliott as Gunner Michael Gregory
- John Gregson as David Paterson
- Hugh Williams as Lt. Col. Richard Wyndham
- Margaret Halstan as Aunt Lydia
- Maureen Delany as Aunt Bridget
- William Hartnell as Company Sergeant Major
- Robert Flemyng as Major
- Roland Culver as Lord B.
- Dandy Nichols as neighbour

== Production ==
The film was shot at Shepperton Studios outside London with sets designed by the art director Vincent Korda.

== Critical reception ==
The Monthly Film Bulletin wrote:

In the manner already familiar from Home at Seven [1952] another play has been transferred literally to the screen, with the minimum recognition of the differences between the two media. The whole presentation seems considerably more suited to television than to the cinema and, as has been pointed out before, such methods show up most cruelly any shortcomings in the play. The Holly and the Ivy seems particularly unsuitable: its dramatic conflict is a matter of a misunderstanding which, since the characters are scarcely explored, remains artificial, and it depends entirely on dialogue. In the circumstances, everything hangs on the playing, but the all star cast employed – Roland Culver, for instance, has a one line part – fail to come together or to suggest a plausible family. Ralph Richardson, looking altogether too robust for his relations' anxiety to appear likely, employs a variety of stage mannerisms (his first entrance, in particular, is purely of the stage), Celia Johnson gives the impression, whether intentional or not, that the self-sacrificing daughter rather enjoys her martyrdom and Denholm Elliott and Margaret Leighton have to contrive emotional crises out of the thinnest material. Filmed theatre demands (cf. Les Parents Terribles) the most disciplined and meticulous technique; this type of direct translation to the screen, using none of the cinema's resources, can only do harm to the play itself.

In British Sound Films: The Studio Years 1928–1959 David Quinlan rated the film as "good", writing: "Pleasant, meaty drama, disliked by some for its theatricality." British critic Leslie Halliwell highlights the work of Ralph Richardson and Celia Johnson, stating: "A badly-filmed stage success which succeeds because of its performances." Leonard Maltin gave the film three of four stars. David Parkinson, in a review for Radio Times, gave the film four of five stars: "The performances are uniformly excellent, right down to Margaret Halstan and Maureen Delany reprising their stage roles as ageing aunts. However, the intrigue here lies in the deft discussion of social issues, moral codes, and family values that still resonate today."

According to the November 2009 Moviemail Catalogue, "Russian screen writer Anatole de Grunwald imbues this poignant adaptation of Wynward Browne's West End stage hit with Chekhov's spirit and relocates the Russian's genius for deftly-drawn characters to a rambling Norfolk parsonage on Christmas Eve. [...] while The Holly and The Ivy now radiates a nostalgic glow, it is actually a revealing record of a country on the cusp of the dramatic social, economic and cultural change that has, sadly, made faith, fidelity and family feel like relics of a distant past."

The Radio Times Guide to Films gave the film 2/5 stars, writing: "The stage origins of this family drama are all too obvious. Vicar Ralph Richardson gathers his children around him at Christmas in his Norfolk rectory, only for the festive spirit to be dampened by a startling revelation. Celia Johnson is on hand like a thick cardigan to provide comfort, and, despite the clunky direction by George More O'Ferrall, the outcome is bleaker than you expect."

== See also ==
- List of Christmas films
