= Moroccan Crisis =

Moroccan Crisis could refer to:

- The First Moroccan Crisis, or the Tangier Crisis, brought about by the visit of Kaiser Wilhelm II to Tangier in Morocco in 1905
- The Second Moroccan Crisis, or the Agadir Crisis, sparked by the deployment of a German warship to the Moroccan port of Agadir in 1911
