= Maureen Delany =

Irish actress (1888–1961)

- Born: Maureen Barry O'Delany; 1 December 1888; Kilkenny, Ireland
- Died: 27 March 1961 (aged 72); London, England
- Other name: Daisy Delany
- Education: Abbey School of Acting
- Occupations: Stage and screen actress
- Years active: 1914-1959
- Spouse: Peter O'Neil

Maureen Barry O'Delany (1 December 1888 – 27 March 1961), professionally known as Maureen Delany and also billed as Maureen Delaney, was an Irish stage and screen actress and singer active primarily in Britain.

== Life and career ==
She was born in Kilkenny, Ireland, daughter of Barry Delany, who died when she was three months old. She was educated in Galway and originally intended to train for the opera, as she had a fine singing voice. However, she was accepted into the Abbey Theatre School by Lennox Robinson. She made her debut on the stage in Edward McNulty's comedy The Lord Mayor in 1914.

She quickly gained a reputation as a noted comic actress and singer. She became identified with Maisie Madigan in Juno and the Paycock and Bessie Burgess in The Plough and the Stars (both by Seán O'Casey), as well as the Widow Quin in Synge's Playboy of the Western World. In 1959 she was nominated for a Tony Award for her part in the play God and Kate Murphy.

She also appeared in a number of plays by Irish playwright Teresa Deevy which were staged at the Abbey Theatre, A Disciple in 1931, Temporal Powers in 1932, Katie Roche in 1937, which toured Broadway at the Ambassador Theatre (Broadway), USA, this play also toured to the Arts Theatre, Cambridge, England also in 1937, Temporal Powers in 1937, In Search of Valour in 1947. She died in her room at a London Hotel on 27 March 1961 and was predeceased by her husband Peter O'Neill, whom she married about 1947; there were no children.

== Filmography ==
Year	Title	Role	Notes
1924	Land of Her Fathers		
1935	His Family Tree	Nellie Oulihan	
1947	Odd Man Out	Theresa O'Brien	
1947	Captain Boycott	Mrs Davin	
1948	The Mark of Cain	Daisy Cobb	
1948	So Evil My Love	Curtis	
1948	Another Shore	Mrs Gleeson	
1949	Saints and Sinners	Postmistress	Uncredited
1949	Under Capricorn	Flo	
1950	Night and the City	Anna O'Leary (Blackmarket)	Uncredited
1952	The Holly and the Ivy	Aunt Bridget	
1956	The March Hare	Bridget	
1956	Jacqueline	Mrs McBride	
1956	The Long Arm	Mrs Stevens, the daily help	
1957	The Rising of the Moon	Old Woman	
1957	The Story of Esther Costello	Jennie Costello	
1957	The Scamp	Mrs Perryman	
1958	Tread Softly Stranger	Mrs Finnegan	
1958	The Doctor's Dilemma	Emmy	

== Playography ==
- A Disciple (1931)
- Temporal Powers (1932)
- Katie Roche (1937)
- Temporal Powers (1937)
- In Search of Valour (1947)
- ITV Playhouse Theatre (1959)
