= Wynyard Browne =

English dramatist, playwright and screenwriter

- Born: Wynyard Barry Browne; 6 October 1911; London, England, United Kingdom
- Died: 19 February 1964 (aged 52); Norwich, Norfolk, England
- Education: Marlborough College, Christ's College, Cambridge
- Occupations: Dramatist; playwright; screenwriter

Wynyard Barry Browne (6 October 1911 – 19 February 1964) was an English dramatist, playwright and screenwriter

== Biography ==
He was born in London in 1911, and educated at Marlborough and Christ's College, Cambridge. His plays include The Holly and the Ivy, which was first produced at the Duchess Theatre in London in 1950 and was adapted to become a film of the same title in 1952, for which he wrote the screenplay. His first play was Dark Summer and other works include A Question of Fact and The Ring of Truth. A traditional dramatist, his work fell out of fashion as 'kitchen sink' dramas revolutionised the London stage. He also adapted the Harold Brighouse play Hobson's Choice for the screen in 1954.

He died in Norwich, Norfolk on 19 February 1964.

== Novels ==
- Sheldon's Way (1935)
- The Fire and the Fiddle (1937)

== Plays and film scripts ==
- Dark Summer (1947)
- The Holly and the Ivy (1950) (also wrote the film version's screenplay, released in 1952)
- A Question of Fact (1953)
- The Ring of Truth (1959)
- Screenwriter Hobson's Choice
