= Penelope (Maugham play) =

1909 play by W. Somerset Maugham

Poster for a 1916 production of Penelope in the Netherlands

Penelope is a 1909 play by W. Somerset Maugham. The play ran for 246 performances.
