= Arthur Watkyn =

British writer and film censor (1907–1965)

- Born: 27 July 1907; Aberystwyth, Cardiganshire, United Kingdom
- Died: 31 July 1965 (aged 58); Chanctonbury Hill, West Sussex, United Kingdom
- Other name: Arthur Thomas Levi Watkins
- Occupations: Writer, film censor

Arthur Thomas Levi Watkins (27 July 1907 – 31 July 1965) was a British public official who served as Secretary of the British Board of Film Censors from 1948 to 1956, then as vice-president of the British Film Producers' Association.

Under the pen name of Arthur Watkyn, he wrote novels and plays.

== Early life ==
Born in Aberystwith, Cardiganshire, Watkins was the son of Richard Edgar Watkins (1872–1947), a bank manager, the son of a brewer in Llandovery, and his wife Katherine Levi (1876–1954), the daughter of a Methodist minister, who had married in Aberystwith in 1906. He had a younger brother, Leonard.

He was educated at Tonbridge School and Christ Church, Oxford.

== Career ==
Watkins was a civil servant at the Home Office from 1941 to 1947. In January 1948, he was appointed as assistant Secretary of the British Board of Film Censors, and in July of that year succeeded Joseph Brooke Wilkinson as Secretary, with an office in Soho Square.

As a censor, Watkins was known for his treatment of film scripts being more liberal than that of his predecessor. In 1951, he introduced the X certificate, to allow films of a more adult nature to be screened to adult-only audiences. In 1956, he left his post as censor to take over as vice-president of the British Film Producers' Association.

Writing under the name Arthur Watkyn, he was also a successful novelist and playwright. A number of his works have been adapted for film and television, including his West End hit comedy For Better, for Worse and his 1952 costume play The Moonraker set during the English Civil War. He also enjoyed success with his 1958 comedy Not in the Book. His play Out of Bounds ran for 31 weeks at Wyndham's Theatre in 1962 before being adapted into the West German film A Mission for Mr. Dodd in 1964.

== Personal life ==
In 1943, in Surrey, Watkins married Elsie Florence Jackaman.

In 1947, Watkins's father died in Eastbourne, leaving an estate valued at £65,328. His wife died in October 1964.

At the time of his death, Watkins was living at Half Moon Cottage, Balcombe, West Sussex. He died on 31 July 1965, according to his probate entry "between Amberley and Storrington". His younger brother Leonard V. Watkins, a holiday camp administrator, was his executor, and his estate was valued at £60,433, equivalent to £982,994 in 2025.

== Bibliography ==
- Harper, Sue & Porter, Vincent. British Cinema of the 1950s: The Decline of Deference. Oxford University Press, 2007.
- Lachman, Marvin. The Villainous Stage: Crime Plays on Broadway and in the West End. McFarland, 2014.
- Mackillop, Ian & Sinyard, Neil. British Cinema of the 1950s: A Celebration. Manchester University Press, 2018.
- Wearing, J.P. The London Stage 1950–1959: A Calendar of Productions, Performers, and Personnel. Rowman & Littlefield, 2014.
