= Linklater =

Linklater may refer to:

== People ==
- Andrew Linklater (1949–2023), international relations academic
- Andro Linklater (1944–2013), Scottish writer and historian
- Barrie Linklater (1931–2017), British illustrator and painter
- Bob Linklater (1893–1953), Australian rugby league footballer
- Duane Linklater (born 1976), Canadian artist of Cree ancestry
- Eric Linklater (1899–1974), Scottish writer and military historian
- F. H. Linklater or Frederick Harvie Linklater (c. 1849–1937), Australian writer and lawyer
- Hamish Linklater (born 1976), American actor, son of Kristin
- Joseph Linklater (1876–1961), New Zealand politician
- Kristin Linklater (1936–2020), actor and theatre director
- Lorelei Linklater (born 1994), American actor, daughter of Richard
- Magnus Linklater (born 1942), Scottish journalist
- Marjorie Linklater (1909–1997), Scottish campaigner of the arts and environment
- Michael Linklater (born 1982), Canadian basketball player
- Richard Linklater (born 1960), American film director and screenwriter
- Scott Linklater (born 1979), New Zealand rugby union footballer
- Veronica Linklater, Baroness Linklater of Butterstone (1943–2022), British politician

== Places ==
- Linklater, Manitoba, Canada
- Linklater, Orkney, a place in Orkney, Scotland

== Other ==
- Linklaters, international law firm

== See also ==
- Linkletter (disambiguation)
