= Kristin Linklater =

Scottish vocal coach (1936–2020)

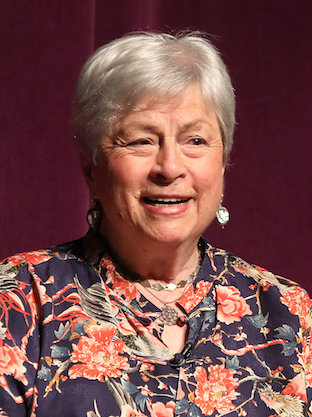
- Linklater in 2017
- Born: 22 April 1936; Edinburgh, Scotland
- Died: 5 June 2020 (aged 84); Housegarth, Orkney, Scotland
- Education: London Academy of Music and Dramatic Art
- Occupations: Actress, director, author, vocal coach, acting teacher
- Children: Hamish Linklater
- Parent(s): Eric Linklater; Marjorie MacIntyre
- Relatives: Magnus Linklater (brother); Andro Linklater (brother)
- Website: www.linklatervoice.com

Kristin Linklater (22 April 1936 – 5 June 2020) was a Scottish vocal coach, acting teacher, actor, theatre director, and author. She retired from the Theatre Arts Division of Columbia University where she was professor emerita. She taught residential courses in Orkney.

== Biography ==
Born in Edinburgh and brought up in the Orkney Isles, Scotland, Linklater trained with Michael MacOwan and Iris Warren at LAMDA. After graduating from LAMDA, she taught voice there for six years. During the 1960s, she relocated to the United States and worked with the Guthrie Theater in Minneapolis, Minnesota and the Stratford Shakespeare Festival in Ontario, Canada. Between 1964 and 1978, she worked as a vocal coach for acting companies led by Robert Whitehead, Harold Clurman, Elia Kazan, and Joseph Chaikin, among others. Linklater also taught voice in New York University's graduate theater program from 1965 to 1978.

Educated at St Leonards School and Downe House School, she was a founding member in 1973 of Shakespeare & Company which was for many years in residence on the former estate of Edith Wharton in Lenox, Massachusetts. Linklater and several British-trained American actors founded the acting troupe of the same name, Shakespeare & Company. She served as co-director, with Tina Packer. She left in the mid-1990s to develop her own approach to voice for actors, influenced by her teachers at LAMDA as well as the Alexander Technique. Her work was designed to liberate the natural function of the vocal mechanism as opposed to developing a vocal technique. Her writings on voice included Freeing the Natural Voice (1976) (ISBN 0-89676-071-5) and Freeing Shakespeare's Voice. (1992); (ISBN 1-55936-031-3)

She was of partial Swedish descent, through her father, Scottish novelist Eric Linklater.

Linklater trained many well-known actors, including Sir Patrick Stewart, Donald Sutherland, Alfre Woodard, Mary Tyler Moore, Bill Murray, Angela Bassett, Courtney Vance, Sigourney Weaver, Sam Rockwell and Bernadette Peters. Linklater was a teacher and head of the Acting program at Emerson College from 1990 to 1996. While at Emerson, Linklater and Harvard psychologist Carol Gilligan led a group called the Company of Women, which explored Shakespeare from a woman's point of view.

In 2013, Linklater established the Linklater Voice Centre in Quoyloo, Orkney, Scotland, to train and coach students in voice technique. That year she was made an honorary fellow of the University of the Highlands and Islands.

Her son by James Lincoln Cormeny is actor Hamish Linklater, who starred in the hit Netflix miniseries Midnight Mass. Her father was novelist Eric Linklater, and her mother was social activist, Marjorie MacIntyre. Her brothers Magnus and Andro Linklater are writers.

On 5 June 2020, Linklater died of a heart attack at the age of 84.

== Bibliography ==
- Linklater, Kristin (June 1976). Freeing the Natural Voice. Drama Publishers. ISBN 0-89676-071-5.
- Linklater, Kristin (November 2006). Revised and Expanded Edition, Freeing the Natural Voice. Drama Publishers, an imprint of Quite Specific Media Group, Ltd. ISBN 978-0-89676-250-3.
- Linklater, Kristin (April 1992). Freeing Shakespeare's Voice: The Actor's Guide to Talking the Text. Theatre Communications Group. ISBN 1-55936-031-3.
- Linklater, Kristin (2019). Revised and Expanded Edition, Meisterwerk Stimme, Entfaltung und Pflege eines natürlichen Instruments (5th ed.). Ernst Reinhardt Verlag, München. ISBN 978-3-497-02902-0.
