= Hamish Linklater =

American actor and playwright (born 1976)

- Linklater in 2026
- Born: July 7, 1976 (age 50); New York City, New York, U.S.
- Education: Amherst College
- Occupations: Actor; playwright; screenwriter; director
- Years active: 1996–present
- Spouse: Jessica Goldberg (m. 2002; div. 2012)
- Partner: Lily Rabe (2013–present)
- Children: 4
- Mother: Kristin Linklater
- Relatives: Marjorie Linklater (grandmother); Eric Linklater (grandfather); Magnus Linklater (uncle); Andro Linklater (uncle)

Hamish Linklater (born July 7, 1976) is an American actor, playwright, screenwriter and director. He is known for his television roles as Matthew Kimble in The New Adventures of Old Christine (2006–2010), Andrew Keanelly in The Crazy Ones (2013–2014), Clark Debussy in Legion (2017–2019), and Father Paul Hill and Monsignor John Pruitt in the Netflix miniseries Midnight Mass (2021).

His performance in Midnight Mass received critical acclaim and earned him a Critics' Choice Television Award nomination and the Critics' Choice Super Award for Best Actor in a Horror Series. In 2026, Linklater received his first Primetime Emmy Award nomination, for Outstanding Guest Actor in a Comedy Series, for his performance as Richard Warren in the Apple TV series Widow's Bay.

On stage, Linklater has performed extensively in Shakespeare and contemporary theater, including productions for The Public Theater, Shakespeare in the Park, Playwrights Horizons and Lincoln Center Theater. He made his Broadway debut in Seminar in 2011. As a playwright, he made his professional debut with The Vandal in 2013 and later wrote The Whirligig. He also co-directed the 2023 film Downtown Owl with Lily Rabe and wrote its screenplay.

Since 2024, he has voiced Bruce Wayne / Batman in the animated series Batman: Caped Crusader.

== Early life ==
Linklater was born in New York City to James Lincoln Cormeny, an actor and stage builder, and Scottish voice teacher, actor, and theater director Kristin Linklater. His maternal grandparents were arts campaigner Marjorie Linklater and Scottish novelist Eric Linklater. His maternal uncles include journalist Magnus Linklater and writer Andro Linklater.

Raised primarily by his mother, Linklater spent part of his childhood in the Berkshires, where he was exposed to theater through Shakespeare & Company, a theater company co-founded by his mother. He began performing small Shakespearean roles at around eight years old.

Linklater graduated from Commonwealth School in Boston in 1994 and later attended Amherst College, where he initially intended to pursue writing.

== Career ==
=== Early work and theater ===
Linklater began his professional career primarily in theater before moving into television and film. His early stage credits included productions of Hamlet, Love's Fire and The Chemistry of Change. He made his film debut in the independent film Groove (2000).

His early television work included a regular role as Dr. Bruce Cherry in the ABC medical drama Gideon's Crossing (2000–2001), followed by appearances in American Dreams and the HBO television film Live from Baghdad, in which he portrayed CNN correspondent Richard Roth.

Linklater continued to work extensively on stage. He portrayed the title role in Hamlet at both Long Wharf Theatre and South Coast Repertory and appeared in Keith Bunin's The Busy World Is Hushed at Playwrights Horizons in 2006. In 2009, he played Sir Andrew Aguecheek opposite Anne Hathaway, Audra McDonald and Raúl Esparza in the Public Theater's Shakespeare in the Park production of Twelfth Night.

=== Television breakthrough ===
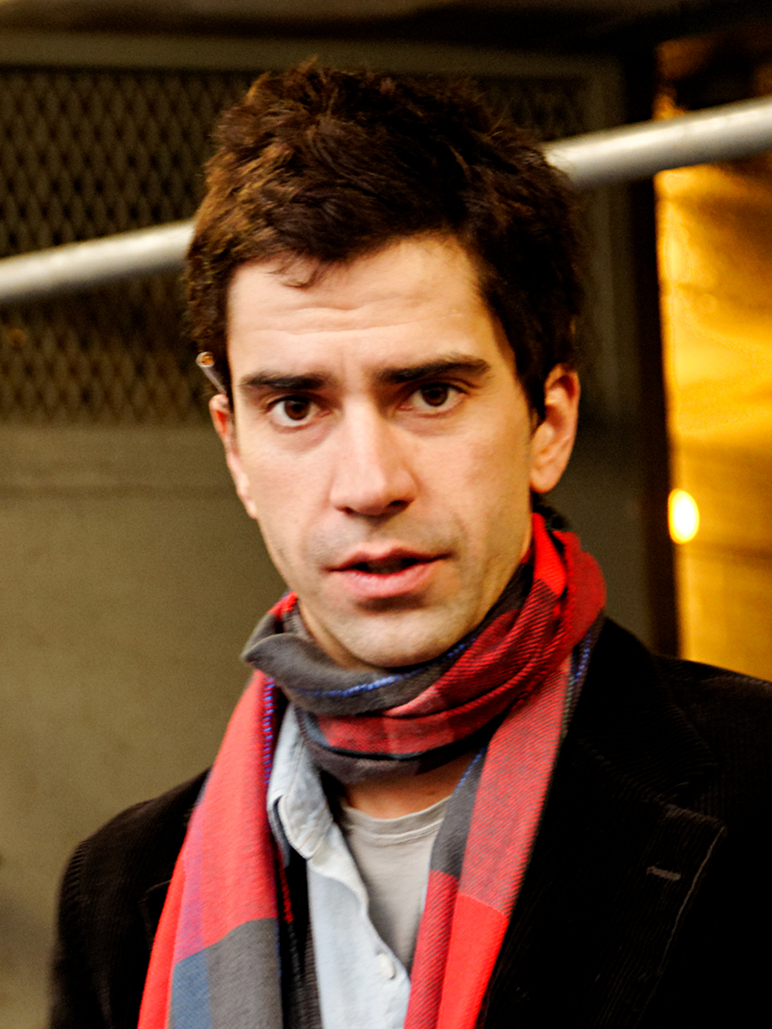
Linklater in 2011

From 2006 to 2010, Linklater played Matthew Kimble, the brother of Julia Louis-Dreyfus' title character, on the CBS sitcom The New Adventures of Old Christine. He appeared in 88 episodes during the show's five-season run.

In 2011, he made his Broadway debut as Martin in Theresa Rebeck's Seminar, appearing alongside Alan Rickman, Lily Rabe, Jerry O'Connell and Hettienne Park.

Linklater's film roles during this period included The Future (2011), Battleship (2012), and the Jackie Robinson biopic 42 (2013), in which he portrayed Brooklyn Dodgers pitcher Ralph Branca.

In 2013, he joined the HBO drama The Newsroom as producer Jerry Dantana before becoming a series regular on the CBS sitcom The Crazy Ones, playing Andrew Keanelly opposite Robin Williams and Sarah Michelle Gellar.

=== Playwriting ===
Linklater made his professional debut as a playwright with The Vandal, which premiered at The Flea Theater in New York in 2013. The play, involving three strangers meeting near a hospital in Kingston, New York, developed from Linklater's interest in grief and mortality.

The Associated Press described The Vandal as Linklater's transition from established stage and television actor to playwright. Linklater later wrote The Whirligig, a play set in the Berkshires dealing with a group of people brought together by the impending death of a young woman. In a 2017 interview with the Los Angeles Times, Linklater said that deaths within his family helped shape the play's development.

=== Legion and Midnight Mass ===
From 2017 to 2019, Linklater portrayed Clark Debussy in the FX superhero drama Legion, created by Noah Hawley. Initially a recurring character, Clark became part of the main cast during the second season. Linklater also appeared in Hawley's Fargo in 2017.

In 2021, he played convicted rapist John Tyler in the Amazon Prime Video thriller Tell Me Your Secrets.

Later that year, Linklater starred in Mike Flanagan's Netflix miniseries Midnight Mass. He portrayed Father Paul Hill, whose identity as the rejuvenated Monsignor John Pruitt becomes central to the story.

The role received considerable critical attention. Entertainment Weekly later argued that his performance merited Emmy recognition, describing it as one of the standout performances of the series. Linklater was nominated for the Critics' Choice Television Award for Best Actor in a Movie/Miniseries and won the Critics' Choice Super Award for Best Actor in a Horror Series.

=== Directing and later work ===
In 2022, Linklater appeared as Jeb Stuart Magruder in the Starz political drama Gaslit and as Rick Krause in the Peacock miniseries Angelyne. He also appeared opposite Christoph Waltz and Willem Dafoe in Walter Hill's Western Dead for a Dollar.

Linklater made his feature-film directing debut with Downtown Owl, co-directed with Lily Rabe. He also wrote the screenplay, adapting Chuck Klosterman's 2008 novel, and served as a producer. The film premiered at the 2023 Tribeca Festival.

In 2024, Linklater portrayed Abraham Lincoln in the Apple TV+ miniseries Manhunt. That year he also began voicing Bruce Wayne / Batman in the Prime Video animated series Batman: Caped Crusader.

In 2025, he joined the second season of the Prime Video series Gen V as Cipher, the new dean of Godolkin University. The character's identity became a major plot point during the season.

He also returned to the stage in 2025 as Jakob Engstrand in a Lincoln Center Theater revival of Henrik Ibsen's Ghosts, alongside Lily Rabe, Billy Crudup, Levon Hawke and Ella Beatty.

In 2026, Linklater guest-starred as Richard Warren, the founder of the fictional island community in the Apple TV comedy horror series Widow's Bay. His performance in the episode "Seasickness" earned him a nomination for the Primetime Emmy Award for Outstanding Guest Actor in a Comedy Series, his first Primetime Emmy nomination.

== Personal life ==
Linklater married playwright Jessica Goldberg in January 2002. They have one daughter and divorced in 2012.

Shortly thereafter, he went public with his relationship with actress Lily Rabe. They have three children together: two daughters and a son.

== Filmography ==
=== Film ===
Year	Title	Role	Notes
2000	Groove	David Turner	
2003	Final Draft	Marty	
2005	Fantastic Four	Leonard	
2008	The Violent Kind	Frank	Direct-to-DVD
2011	The Future	Jason	
2012	Battleship	Cal Zapata	
2012	Lola Versus	Henry	
2013	42	Ralph Branca	
2013	Redemption Trail	David	
2014	The Angriest Man in Brooklyn	Tommy Altmann	
2014	Magic in the Moonlight	Brice	
2015	One More Time	Tim	
2015	Ithaca	Tom Spangler	
2015	The Big Short	Porter Collins	Nominated—Actor Award for Outstanding Performance by a Cast in a Motion Picture
2017	A Midsummer Night's Dream	Lysander	
2017	Paper Year	Noah Bearinger	
2017	You Can't Say No	Miles	
2019	Unicorn Store	Gary	
2020	10 Things We Should Do Before We Break Up	Benjamin	
2022	Dead for a Dollar	Martin Kidd	
2023	Downtown Owl	Principal Valentine	Director, screenwriter, producer
2024	Nickel Boys	Maynard Spencer	
2024	The Life of Chuck	American Reporter	Voice
2024	Barron's Cove	Lyle Chambers	
2025	A Big Bold Beautiful Journey	David's father	
2026	The Whisper Man	Norman Collins	
2027	The Exorcist: Martyrs	TBA	Post-production

=== Television ===
Year	Title	Role	Notes
2000–2001	Gideon's Crossing	Dr. Bruce Cherry	20 episodes
2002	Live from Baghdad	Richard Roth	Television film
2003	Happy Family	Todd Brennan	Episode: "Pilot" (scenes deleted)
2003	Dragnet	Kevin Grimes	Episode: "The Magic Bullet"
2004	American Dreams	Pvt. Stan Silver	9 episodes
2004	Five Days to Midnight	Carl Axelrod	5 episodes
2006–2010	The New Adventures of Old Christine	Matthew Kimble	88 episodes
2007	Pushing Daisies	John Joseph Jacobs	Episode: "Girth"
2009	Ugly Betty	Evan York	Episode: "Blue on Blue"
2012	The Big C	Dave Cooper	4 episodes
2012	Law & Order: Special Victims Unit	David Morris	Episode: "Manhattan Vigil"
2012–2013	The Good Wife	David LaGuardia	2 episodes
2013	The Newsroom	Jerry Dantana	6 episodes
2013–2014	The Crazy Ones	Andrew Keanelly	22 episodes
2017	Fargo	Larue Dollard	4 episodes
2017–2019	Legion	Clark Debussy	14 episodes
2020	Monsterland	Dr. Joe Keller	Episode: "New Orleans, Louisiana"
2020	The Stand	Dr. Ellis	Episode: "The End"
2021	Tell Me Your Secrets	John Tyler	10 episodes
2021	Midnight Mass	Father Paul Hill/Monsignor John Pruitt	7 episodes Critics' Choice Super Award for Best Actor in a Horror Series; Nominated—Critics' Choice Television Award for Best Actor in a Movie/Miniseries
2022	Gaslit	Jeb Magruder	Miniseries, 5 episodes
2022	Angelyne	Rick Krause	Miniseries, 4 episodes
2024	Manhunt	Abraham Lincoln	Miniseries, 7 episodes
2024	American Horror Story: Delicate	Himself	Episode: "Little Gold Man"; uncredited
2024–present	Batman: Caped Crusader	Bruce Wayne / Batman	Voice
2025	Gen V	Cipher / Dr. Gold / Thomas Godolkin / Doug Brightbill	8 episodes Nominated—Critics' Choice Super Award for Best Actor in a Superhero Series
2026	Elsbeth	Archer Kopunek	Episode: "Ol' Man Liver"
2026	Widow's Bay	Richard Warren	2 episodes Nominated—Primetime Emmy Award for Outstanding Guest Actor in a Comedy Series
2026	Crystal Lake	Elias Wittering	3 episodes

=== Theater ===
Selected credits (adapted from About the Artists).

Year	Title	Role	Venue	Notes
1996	Adventures of Huckleberry Finn	Tom Sawyer / Buck Grangerford	Actors Theatre of Louisville	
1998	Love's Fire		The Public Theater	
1999	The Chemistry of Change	Shep	Women's Project Theatre	
1999	Hamlet	Laertes	The Public Theater	
2001	Good Thing	Dean	Susan Stein Shiva Theater	Workshop
2001	Good Thing	Dean	The Theater at St. Clements	
2003	Recent Tragic Events	Andrew	Playwrights Horizon	
2004	Hamlet	Hamlet	Long Wharf Theatre	
2005	The Singing Forest	Young Walter / Gray Korankyi	Long Wharf Theatre	
2006	The Busy World is Hushed	Brandt	Playwrights Horizon	
2007	Hamlet	Hamlet	South Coast Repertory	
2009	Twelfth Night	Sir Andrew Aguecheek	Delacorte Theater	Shakespeare in the Park
2010	The Winter's Tale	Lord / Autolycus	Delacorte Theater	Shakespeare in the Park
2010	The Merchant of Venice	Bassanio	Delacorte Theater	Shakespeare in the Park
2011	The School for Lies	Frank	Classic Stage Company	World premiere
2011–2012	Seminar	Martin	John Golden Theatre	World Broadway premiere
2013	The Comedy of Errors	Antipholus	Delacorte Theater	Shakespeare in the Park
2014	Much Ado About Nothing	Benedick	Delacorte Theater	Shakespeare in the Park
2015	Posterity	Gustav Vigeland	Atlantic Theater Company	World premiere
2015	Cymbeline	Leonatus / Cloten	Delacorte Theater	Shakespeare in the Park
2017	Mamma Mia!	Harry Bright	Hollywood Bowl	
2017	The Whirligig	Crew, Writer	Signature Theatre Center	Opened May 21, 2017
2018	Henry IV	Prince Hal	The Shakespeare Center of Los Angeles	
2019	The Pain of My Belligerence	Guy	Playwrights Horizon	World premiere
2025	Ghosts	Jakob Engstrand	Mitzi E. Newhouse Theater	Lincoln Center
2026	The Disappear	Benjamin Braxton	Audible Minetta Lane Theater	World premiere
