= Private Angelo (film) =

- Australian 1-sheet poster
- Directed by: Michael Anderson; Peter Ustinov
- Written by: Michael Anderson; Peter Ustinov
- Based on: Private Angelo by Eric Linklater
- Produced by: Michael Anderson; Peter Ustinov
- Starring: Peter Ustinov; Godfrey Tearle; María Denis; Marjorie Rhodes; James Robertson Justice
- Cinematography: Erwin Hillier
- Edited by: Charles Hasse
- Music by: Vittorio Pirone
- Production company: Pilgrim Pictures
- Distributed by: Associated British-Pathé
- Release date: 6 July 1949
- Running time: 106 minutes
- Country: United Kingdom
- Language: English
- Budget: £218,713
- Box office: £89,980 (UK)

Private Angelo is a 1949 British comedy war film directed by Michael Anderson and Peter Ustinov and starring Ustinov, Godfrey Tearle, María Denis and Marjorie Rhodes. It was written by Anderson and Ustinov, adapted from the 1946 novel Private Angelo by Eric Linklater.

It depicts the misadventures of a soldier in the Italian Army during the Second World War.

== Cast ==
- Peter Ustinov as Private Angelo
- Godfrey Tearle as Count Piccologrando
- María Denis as Lucrezia
- Marjorie Rhodes as Countess
- James Robertson Justice as Feste
- Moyna Macgill as Marchesa Dolce
- Robin Bailey as Simon Telfer
- Harry Locke as Corporal Trivet
- Bill Shine as Colonel Michael
- John Harvey as Corporal McCunn
- Diana Graves as Lucia

== Production ==
A number of scenes were filmed in the Italian village of Trequanda in the Province of Siena. It also featured music played by the Società Filarmonica di Trequanda. The film's costumes were designed by Ustinov's mother Nadia Benois. Interiors were shot at Welwyn Studios, with sets designed by the art director John Howell.

== Reception ==
=== Box office ===
As of 1 April 1950 the film earned distributor's gross receipts of £36,994 in the UK of which £19,489 went to the producer. The film made a loss of £199,224.

=== Critical ===
The Monthly Film Bulletin wrote: "The film tells a wartime story that has tragic as well as comic aspects, but it is the comic side with which it is chiefly concerned. ... Peter Ustinov's direction and performance as Angelo make a vivid impression. Godfrey Tearle distinguishes himself as the Count, Robin Bailey and Bill Shine do especially well as Telfer and his Colonel."

Kine Weekly wrote: "Peter Ustinov is not entirely successful in interpreting the scruffy Angelo's philosophy, but his performance is not without merit. To be fair, we don't think an actor could have got nearer to the author's conception."
