= Molly Urquhart =

Scottish actress (1906–1977)

- in House of Mystery (1961)
- Born: Mary Sinclair Urquhart; 6 January 1906; Glasgow, Lanarkshire, Scotland
- Died: 6 October 1977 (aged 71); Glasgow, Scotland
- Occupation: Actress
- Spouse: William MacIntosh

Molly Sinclair Urquhart (6 January 1906 – 6 October 1977) was a Scottish actress.

== Early life ==
Urquhart was born in Glasgow as Mary Sinclair Urquhart. She was the daughter of post office clerk Ann McCallum and sea-going engineer William Urquhart. She grew up in the West End of Glasgow where she attended Dowanhill Primary School and Church Street School. After school, she worked in a shop and took the exam to work for the GPO.

She had no formal training in theatre, coming to the profession through the "amateur movement". While a teenager in the late 1920s, she joined the St. George Players, an amateur club. In 1931, she became a member of the Tron Theatre Club in Glasgow, followed by Glasgow's Curtain Theatre in 1932. She adopted the name Molly Urquhart for her stage name.

== Career ==
=== Theatre ===
In 1932, Urquhart joined the Howard and Wyndham company, becoming a professional actress. Her first professional role was in the melodrama Jeannie Deans at Theatre Royal, Glasgow in 1934. She then moved to repertory theatre in England and Scotland, including joining the Sheldon-Browne Company in 1936 and the company of the Festival Theatre, Cambridge.

During World War II, she set up and ran her own repertory theatre company, the Molly S. Urquhart Theatre or MSU Theatre (now known as the Rutherglen Repertory Theatre) in a former church on East Main Street in Rutherglen, Scotland in 1939. Urquhart not only acted, but also directed plays and managed the MSU Theatre. The company included Eileen Herlie, Gordon Jackson, Duncan Macrae, and Nicholas Parsons. Their first show was Merton Hodge's The Wind and the Rain which opened on 2 May 1939.

In 1944, MSU Theatre closed; Urquhart and others from the company joined the newly established Citizens Theatre in Glasgow. She remained with the Citizens until 1956, performing in plays such as James Bridie's The Forrigan Reel and The Tintock Cup.

In 1945 when The Forrigan Reel toured, she had her first performance in London at Sadlers Wells Theatre. Her "greatest triumph" was said to be at the Edinburgh Festival of 1948 where she played Dame Sensualite in Tyrone Guthrie's production of A Satire of the Three Estates at the Assembly Hall. She appeared in London's West End in Eric Linklater's plays Love in Albania in 1949 and The Mortimer Touch in 1952. In 1953, she joined the Five Past Eight Show which was based at Alhambra Theatre in Glasgow; the show ran throughout the 1950s. Her portrayal of Bessie Burgess in West End revival of The Plough and the Stars in 1962 was "a notable hit".

=== Film and television ===
Urquhart's first film role was in the 1955 comedy Geordie with Alastair Sim under the direction of Fred Zinnerman. This was the beginning of numerous films that Urquhart made with Zinnerman; others included as Geordie (1955), The Nun's Story (1959), The Sundowners (1960), and A Man For All Seasons (1966). She also had roles in the films Floodtide (1949), Portrait of Clare (1950), and Blonde Sinner (1956).

She had a role in the BBC television series Doctor Finlay's Casebook and the made-for-television film The Little Minister in 1950.

== Honours and legacy ==
- A dramatised version of her life was performed by Dumbarton People's Theatre.
- Helen Murdoch wrote a biography of Urquhart entitled Travelling Hopefully: The Story of Molly Urquhart.
- Her papers are stored at the University of Glasgow Special Collections.

== Personal life ==
In August 1934, she married William MacIntosh (1900-1959), a police officer. In 1949, he became the first manager of the Citizens Theatre when it was located at Gorbals. The couple had one son, James Urquhart McIntosh, in 1943. They lived in Ibrox, Glasgow.

She died in 1977 at the age of 71 in Glasgow.

== Partial filmography ==
Year	Title	Role	Notes
1949	Floodtide	Guest at Mrs. Dow's	Uncredited
1950	Portrait of Clare	Thirza	
1951	Happy Go Lovely	Madame Amanda's Assistant	
1952	Hunted	Barmaid	
1952	You're Only Young Twice	Lady Duffy	
1955	Geordie	Geordie's Mother	
1956	Yield to the Night	Matron Mason	
1956	Child in the House	Mrs. Parsons	
1957	Doctor at Large	Mrs. Ives	Uncredited
1959	The Nun's Story	Sister Augustine (Africa)	
1959	Devil's Bait	Mrs Tanner	
1960	The Big Day	Mrs. Deeping – Baker's secretary	
1960	The Sundowners	Mrs. Bateman	
1961	House of Mystery (1961 film)	Mrs. Bucknall	
1964	Behold a Pale Horse	Hospital Nurse	
1966	A Man For All Seasons	Maid	
1973	Digby, the Biggest Dog in the World	Aunt Ina	
1974	The Black Windmill	Margaret	
1977	Julia	Woman	

== Television ==
Year	Title	Role	Director	Production	Notes
1959	Spindrift	Ina	Finlay J. Macdonald	BBC Scotland	play by Naomi Mitchison and Denis Macintosh, adapted for television by Ada F. Kay
