= Hugh Buchanan =

Hugh Buchanan may refer to:

- Hugh Buchanan (politician) (1823–1890), Scottish-born American army officer, attorney and politician
- Hugh Buchanan (artist) (born 1958), Scottish watercolour painter
