= The House of Gair =

1953 novel

- First edition
- Author: Eric Linklater
- Language: English
- Genre: Thriller
- Publisher: Jonathan Cape
- Publication date: 1953
- Publication place: United Kingdom
- Media type: Print

The House of Gair is a 1953 thriller novel by the British writer Eric Linklater. During a storm a young writer stops at a lonely house in the Scottish Highlands and encounters its strange owner.

The following year it was adapted as an episode of the American TV series Studio One featuring Basil Rathbone, Cora Witherspoon and Hurd Hatfield.

== Bibliography ==
- Hart, Francis Russell. The Scottish Novel: From Smollett to Spark. Harvard University Press, 1978.
