= The Mortimer Touch =

1952 play

- Original language: English
- Written by: Eric Linklater
- Genre: Comedy
- Setting: Edinburgh, Scotland

Premiere
- Date: 31 March 1952
- Place: Wimbledon Theatre, London

The Mortimer Touch is a comedy play by the British writer Eric Linklater. It was developed out of an earlier work of his The Atom Doctor which appeared at the 1950 Edinburgh Festival and drew inspiration from Ben Jonson's The Alchemist.

It premiered at the Wimbledon Theatre before transferring to the Duke of York's Theatre in the West End where it ran for 45 performances between 30 April and 7 June 1952. The original West End cast included Mervyn Johns, Roger Livesey, Richard Pearson, George Relph, William Mervyn, Harry Towb, Vincent Holman, Mona Washbourne, Pamela Brown, Esma Cannon, Glen Alyn and Molly Urquhart. It was published the same year by Samuel French.

== Bibliography ==
- Reilly, John M. Twentieth Century Crime & Mystery Writers. Springer, 2015.
- Royle, Trevor. The Macmillan Companion to Scottish Literature. Macmillan, 1983.
- Wearing, J. P. The London Stage 1950–1959: A Calendar of Productions, Performers, and Personnel. Rowman & Littlefield, 2014.
