= Shakespeare & Company (Massachusetts) =

Theatre company

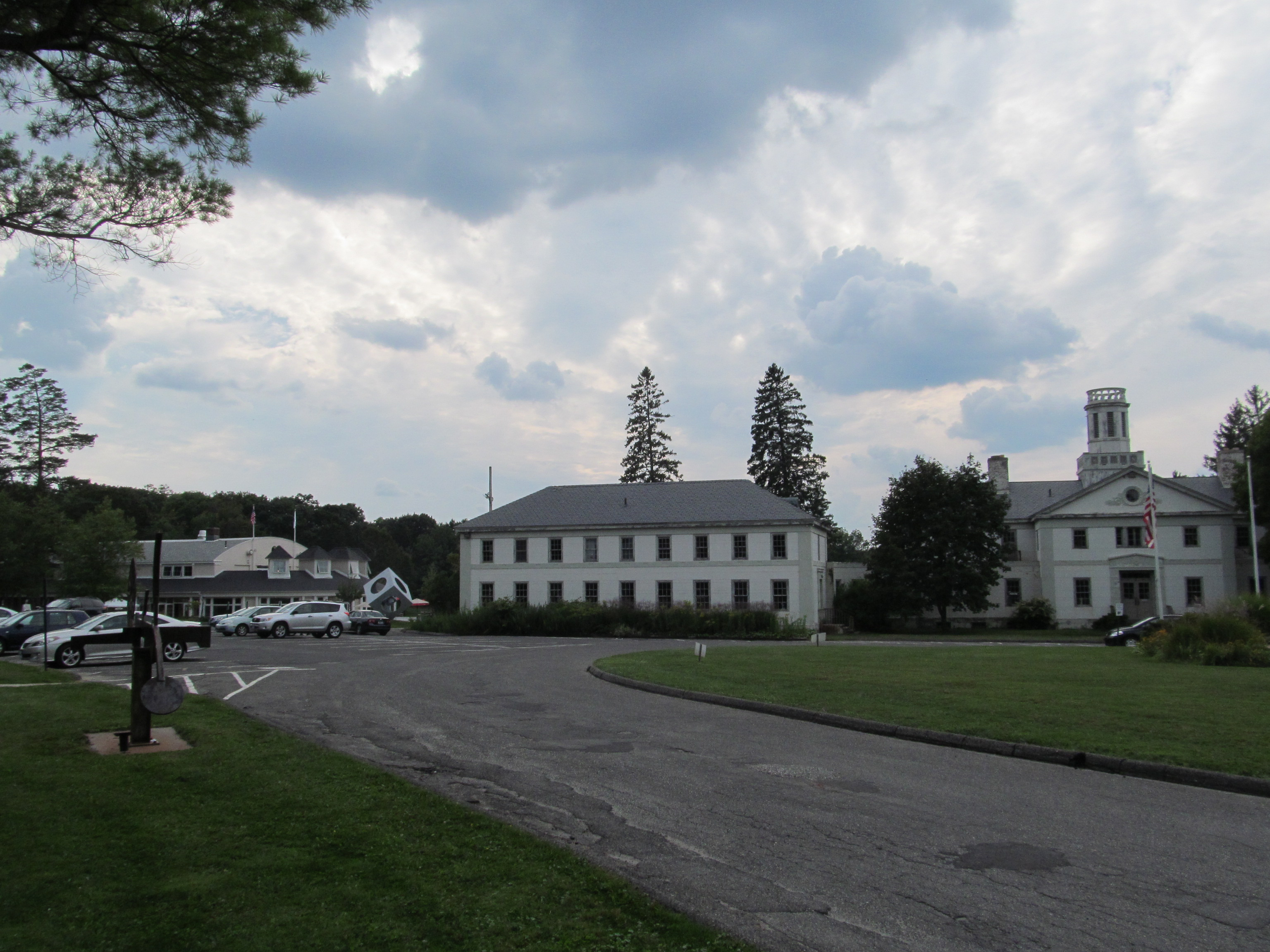
- Shakespeare & Company campus
- Interactive map of Shakespeare & Company
- Address: 70 Kemble Street; Lenox, Massachusetts; United States
- Coordinates: 42°20′54.9″N 73°17′0.4″W

Construction
- Opened: 1978 (company); 2001 (current venue)

Website
- www.shakespeare.org

Shakespeare & Company is a theatre company in Lenox, Massachusetts, that aims to perform William Shakespeare's works and develop new plays.

The company was officially established at The Mount in Lenox in 1978, by original members Kevin Coleman (later the Education Director), Tina Packer (the Founding Artistic Director), Dennis Krausnik, and Kristin Linklater. It has received the Commonwealth Award from the Commonwealth of Massachusetts for its contributions to the quality of life in the commonwealth.

== Lenox, Massachusetts property site ==
The property originally included 22 buildings, including a structure named St. Martin Hall, designed by Stanford White. It was previously owned by Bible Speaks, which held over 62 acres in the late 1970s and 1980s, and later by the National Music Foundation, but was never used. Shakespeare & Company bought the property in 2000 for $3.5 million and sold off about 30 acres in 2005.

In 2024, the company began collaborating with David Carver of CT Management Group on a plan to refurbish the remaining 32 acres that would involve keeping the stages intact and developing company-owned condominiums on the remainder of the property. The plan was approved in February 2025.

== Educational Programs ==
The following educational programs are run by Shakespeare and Company:

- Riotous Youth - short summer sessions in Shakespeare and theatre for ages 7-14
- Shakespeare & Young Company - an intensive for ages 16-20
- Shakespeare and the Courts - a program for juvenile offenders in Berkshire County, Massachusetts, to take theatre classes and present a full production of a Shakespearean play
- Fall Festival of Shakespeare - a festival for students in New York and Massachusetts to present Shakespearean plays in their schools and later at the Tina Packer Playhouse in Lenox
- Directors-in-Residency Program - a program for teachers of elementary through college-aged students to learn about directing Shakespeare’s plays

Additionally, the company has produced an annual tour of Shakespeare's comedies and tragedies, performed by six actors, since 1982 (excluding 2020, when the company’s summer season was canceled due to the COVID-19 pandemic). The actors in the plays perform most of the technical and administrative work related to the tour and often lead workshops after performances.

== Notable actors and alumni ==
- Karen Allen
- Reed Birney
- Olympia Dukakis
- Hamish Linklater
- Christopher Lloyd
- Fred Melamed
- John Douglas Thompson
- Finn Wittrock
