= Andro Linklater =

Scottish non-fiction writer and historian (1944–2013)

Andro Ian Robert Linklater (10 December 1944 – 3 November 2013) was a Scottish non-fiction writer, historian and economic historian.

== Life ==
He was the youngest son of Eric Linklater, a poet and Marjorie MacIntyre, an arts campaigner. His brother is journalist Magnus Linklater and his sisters include Kristin Linklater. His nephew is film actor Hamish Linklater.

He was educated at Belhaven Hill School, Winchester College and New College, Oxford, where he read Modern History. At the end of the 1960s he lived in the United States, but returned to Britain to teach in Scotland and London, before turning to writing after his father's death in 1974.

His book Measuring America led to a series of books on American history, about which he was an eloquent speaker.

Linklater's book Why Spencer Perceval Had To Die focuses on the assassination of British Prime Minister Spencer Perceval, looking at the conspiracy theories surrounding it, and revealing the historical context. Antony Beevor has called it "a beautifully written portrait".

His work appeared in Prospect Magazine, The Spectator, The Sunday Times, The Guardian, The Daily Telegraph, Reader's Digest and Daily Mail.

Linklater was married to photographer Marie-Louise Avery and lived in rural Kent. He had a heart attack after a day of typically strenuous cycling while researching his next book on the island of Eigg, and died in Edinburgh Royal Infirmary a week later. His obituary in The Times said that "He took time to help aspiring writers, wrote eloquent prayers to be recited in his church, and regularly took up the cudgels on behalf of local causes."

== Works ==
- Owning the Earth: The Transforming History of Land Ownership. Bloomsbury. 2013. ISBN 978-1-62040-289-4.
- An Artist in Treason: The Extraordinary Double Life of General James Wilkinson. Walker & Company. 29 September 2009. ISBN 978-0-8027-1720-7.
- The Fabric of America: How Our Borders and Boundaries Shaped the Country and Forged Our National Identity. Walker & Co. 2007. ISBN 978-0802715333.
- Measuring America: How an Untamed Wilderness Shaped the United States and Fulfilled the Promise of Democracy. Walker & Co. 2002. ISBN 978-0-8027-1396-4.
- Andro Linklater; Donald Hill (2001). The code of love: the true story of two lovers torn apart by the war that brought them together. Doubleday. ISBN 978-0-385-50115-6.
- The code of love: a true story. Weidenfeld & Nicolson. 2000. ISBN 978-0-297-64358-6.
- Wild People: Travels with Borneo's Head-Hunters. Atlantic Monthly Press. 1994. ISBN 978-0-87113-477-6. (1st edition 1990)
- Compton Mackenzie: a life. B. Blackwell. 1988. ISBN 978-1-55786-010-1.
- An unhusbanded life: Charlotte Despard : suffragette, socialist, and Sinn Feiner. Hutchinson. 1980.
- Amazing Maisie and the Cold Porridge Brigade. Pantheon Books. 1978. ISBN 978-0-394-94009-0.
- Eric Linklater; Andro Linklater (1977). The Black Watch: the history of the Royal Highland Regiment. Barrie & Jenkins.
- Why Spencer Perceval Had To Die: the Assassination of a British Prime Minister. Bloomsbury. 10 May 2012. ISBN 978-1-4088-2840-3. "Andro Linklater."
