= Kay Cavendish =

British pianist and entertainer (1908–2000)

- Born: Kathleen Dorothy Cavendish Murray; 1 October 1908; Hong Kong
- Died: 23 January 2000 (aged 89); Tunbridge Wells, Kent, England

Kathleen Dorothy Cavendish Murray (1 October 1908 – 23 January 2000), who was billed as Kay Cavendish, was a British pianist and popular entertainer.

== Early life ==
Cavendish was born in Hong Kong to John Alexander Shakespear Murray and his wife, Constance Ellen Louisa Clarke. She studied at the Royal Academy of Music, where she was awarded a gold medal.

== Career ==
Cavendish became a member of the Cavendish Three, a close harmony trio. and made over 400 episodes of her weekly BBC radio programme Kay on the Keys.

Cavendish appeared on the comedy programme It's That Man Again during World War II, entertained troops for ENSA, and appeared in the film Poet's Pub (1949).

Cavendish appeared as a castaway on the BBC Radio programme Desert Island Discs on 5 February 1962.

== Death ==
Cavendish died in Tunbridge Wells, Kent, aged 89.
