= Love in Albania =

1949 play

- Original language: English
- Written by: Eric Linklater
- Genre: Comedy
- Setting: London, England, Summer 1944

Premiere
- Date: 1949
- Place: Lyric Theatre, Hammersmith

Love in Albania is a comedy play by the British writer Eric Linklater, which was originally performed in 1949. After appearing at the Lyric Theatre, Hammersmith it transferred to St James's Theatre in the West End. Directed by and starring Peter Ustinov the cast also included Brenda Bruce, Molly Urquhart, Peter Jones and Robin Bailey. It was staged with the support of the Arts Council of Great Britain. Ustinov played a buffoonish American military policeman searching for his long-lost daughter in wartime London.

== Bibliography ==
- Reilly, John M. Twentieth Century Crime & Mystery Writers. Springer, 2015.
- Tanitch, Robert . London Stage in the 20th Century. Haus Publishing, 2007.
- Willians, Geoffrey. Peter Ustinov. Peter Owen, 1957.
