= Magnus Merriman =

1934 novel by Eric Linklater

- First edition (UK)
- Author: Eric Linklater
- Language: English
- Genre: Comedy
- Publisher: Jonathan Cape (UK); Farrar and Rinehart (US)
- Publication date: 1934
- Publication place: United Kingdom
- Media type: Print

Magnus Merriman is a 1934 comedy novel by the British writer Eric Linklater. It portrays the adventures of an aspiring politician who marries and settles down on Orkney. It had a strong autobiographical element as Linklater had himself unsuccessfully stood in the 1933 East Fife by-election for the National Party of Scotland, Although Link later wrote an introduction to the book titled "Admonition" denying autobiographical intent.

== Bibliography ==
- Hart, Francis Russell. The Scottish Novel: From Smollett to Spark. Harvard University Press, 1978.
- Watson, Roderick. The Literature of Scotland. Macmillan International Higher Education, 2016.
