= Poet's Pub =

1949 British film by Frederick Wilson

- Film poster
- Directed by: Frederick Wilson
- Written by: Diana Morgan
- Based on: Poet's Pub by Eric Linklater
- Produced by: Donald B. Wilson
- Starring: Derek Bond; Rona Anderson; James Robertson Justice; Joyce Grenfell; Maurice Denham
- Cinematography: Bill Allan; Arthur Ibbetson; George Stretton
- Edited by: Peter Bezencenet
- Music by: Clifton Parker
- Production company: Aquila Film
- Distributed by: General Film Distributors
- Release date: 5 July 1949
- Running time: 79 minutes
- Country: United Kingdom
- Language: English

Poet's Pub is a 1949 British second feature ('B') comedy film directed by Frederick Wilson and starring Derek Bond, Rona Anderson and James Robertson Justice. It was written by Diana Morgan based on the 1929 novel of the same title by Eric Linklater. The film was one of four of David Rawnsley's Aquila Films that used his "independent frame" technique.

== Plot ==
Saturday Keitth, a budding poet, is persuaded to become manager of the Pelican Pub, after complaining about the food and service. With the help of his friend Quentin Cotton, the pub does well and becomes very popular. A priceless jewelled gauntlet is discovered, and while wearing it, Joanna Benbow, a guest at an Elizabethan masque in the grounds of the pub, is kidnapped. All the guests rally to rescue her.

== Cast ==
- Derek Bond as Saturday Keith
- Rona Anderson as Joanna Benbow
- James Robertson Justice as Prof. Benbow
- John McLaren as Elmer Van Buren
- Barbara Murray as Nelly Bly
- Peter Croft as Quentin Cotton
- Leslie Dwyer as Holly
- Joyce Grenfell as Miss Horsefell-Hughes
- Fabia Drake as Lady Mercy Cotton
- Maurice Denham as PC Windle
- Kay Cavendish as Jean Forbes
- Andrew Osborn as Williams
- Iris Hoey as Lady Keith
- Vincent Ball as Stacey
- Ernest Berk as dancer
- Elizabeth Blake as dancer
- Dennis Brian as member, Oxford crew
- Derek Briggs as cyclist
- Olwen Brookes as bridge player
- Ann Codrington as bridge player
- Deidre Doyle as Mrs. Arnott
- Geoffrey Dunn as Mr. Sedgwick
- Alexander Field as waiter
- Dorothy Green as bridge player
- Pat Hagen as dancer
- Mona K. Harrison as bridge player
- Patricia Hayes as Mrs. Lott
- Walter Horsbrugh as curate
- Roddy Hughes as Truscott
- Peter Illing as Charles
- Jennifer Jayne as cyclist
- Sam Kydd as George
- Arthur Lowe as coach guide
- Michael McKeag as cyclist
- Mike Oxley as cyclist
- Dermot Palmer as Harris
- John Singer as Cox
- Philip Stainton as Mr. Lott
- Anthony Steel as Compton
- Joan Sterndale-Bennett
- Dennis Vance as Scriven
- Leslie Weston as Higgins
- Mela White as cyclist
- Edward Rigby as pageant watching villager (uncredited)

== Production ==
The film was made at Pinewood Studios. It features actors viewing a combined radiogram television receiver made by Alba in 1948.

== Reception ==
The Monthly Film Bulletin wrote: "This film, the last to be made under the present Independent Frame system (in future relegated for use only in certain sequences of films where its limitations are less important), is technically more finished than its predecessors, chiefly because the system was not applied throughout production. But Eric Linklater's sophisticated novel of the thirties is hardly suitable for such naive direction and playing. Some may find compensation in Joyce Grenfell's sketch of the local historian."

Picture Show wrote: "This adaptation of one of Eric Linklater's earlier novels suffers from far too much talk which slows down the action considerably. ... Picturesquely staged and well acted."

Picturegoer wrote: "In spite of the fact that direction is rather ragged, this adaptation of Eric Linklater's delightful novel is really good fun."
