= Linkletter =

Linkletter is a surname found primarily in the Orkney Islands, but possibly subject to Old Norse influence.

== Notable people ==
- Art Linkletter (1912–2010), Canadian-born radio and television personality
- Jack Linkletter (1937–2007), American actor and journalist
- Diane Linkletter (1948–1969), American celebrity family member
- Nicole Linkletter (born 1985), American model
- Scott Linkletter, founder of Cows Creamery in Prince Edward Island, Canada

== Fictional characters ==
- Dr. Grant Linkletter, a recurring character from Young Sheldon, an American sitcom.

== See also ==
- Linkletter Provincial Park, a provincial park in Prince Edward Island, Canada
- Linklater (disambiguation)
