= 10 Things We Should Do Before We Break Up =

- Poster
- Directed by: Galt Niederhoffer
- Written by: Galt Niederhoffer
- Starring: Christina Ricci; Hamish Linklater
- Release date: February 21, 2020
- Running time: 74 minutes
- Country: United States
- Language: English

10 Things We Should Do Before We Break Up is a 2020 American romantic comedy drama film written and directed by Galt Niederhoffer and starring Christina Ricci and Hamish Linklater.

== Plot summary ==
The film follows the story of Abigail, a single mother who is struggling with her relationship with her boyfriend, Ben. After a heated argument, Abigail decides that they should break up, but Ben suggests that they should complete a list of ten things before they do so. The two embark on a series of adventures, including skydiving, swimming in a lake, and attending a wedding, all while trying to figure out if they should stay together or go their separate ways. Along the way, they confront their fears and insecurities, and ultimately learn more about themselves and each other. The film explores themes of love, commitment, and the importance of taking risks in relationships.

== Cast ==
- Christina Ricci as Abigail
- Hamish Linklater as Benjamin
- Lindsey Broad as Kate
- Brady Jennes as Luke
- Katia Winter as Terren
- Jon Abrahams as Tim
- Scott Adsit as Barry

== Release ==
The film was released in the United States and Canada on VOD platforms and limited theaters on February 21, 2020. Then it was released on DVD on March 24, 2020.

== Reception ==
Alex Saveliev of Film Threat rated the film an 8 out of 10 and wrote, "A welcome, albeit brief, respite from our tumultuous times, 10 Things We Should Do Before We Break Up provides you with at least 10 reasons to like it."

Sandie Angulo Chen of Common Sense Media awarded the film three stars out of five.
