= Poet's Pub (novel) =

1929 novel

- First edition
- Author: Eric Linklater
- Language: English
- Genre: Comedy
- Publisher: Jonathan Cape
- Publication date: 1929
- Publication place: United Kingdom
- Media type: Print

Poet's Pub is a 1929 comedy novel by the British writer Eric Linklater. An aspiring poet is hired by his friend's mother to run a large inn she has acquired. In 1935 it was one of the original ten Penguin Paperbacks to be published.

== Adaptation ==
In 1949 it was adapted into a film of the same title directed by Frederick Wilson and starring Derek Bond, Rona Anderson and James Robertson Justice.

== Bibliography ==
- Goble, Alan. The Complete Index to Literary Sources in Film. Walter de Gruyter, 1999.
- Hart, Francis Russell. The Scottish Novel: From Smollett to Spark. Harvard University Press, 1978.
