= Belhaven Hill School =

Preparatory school in Scotland

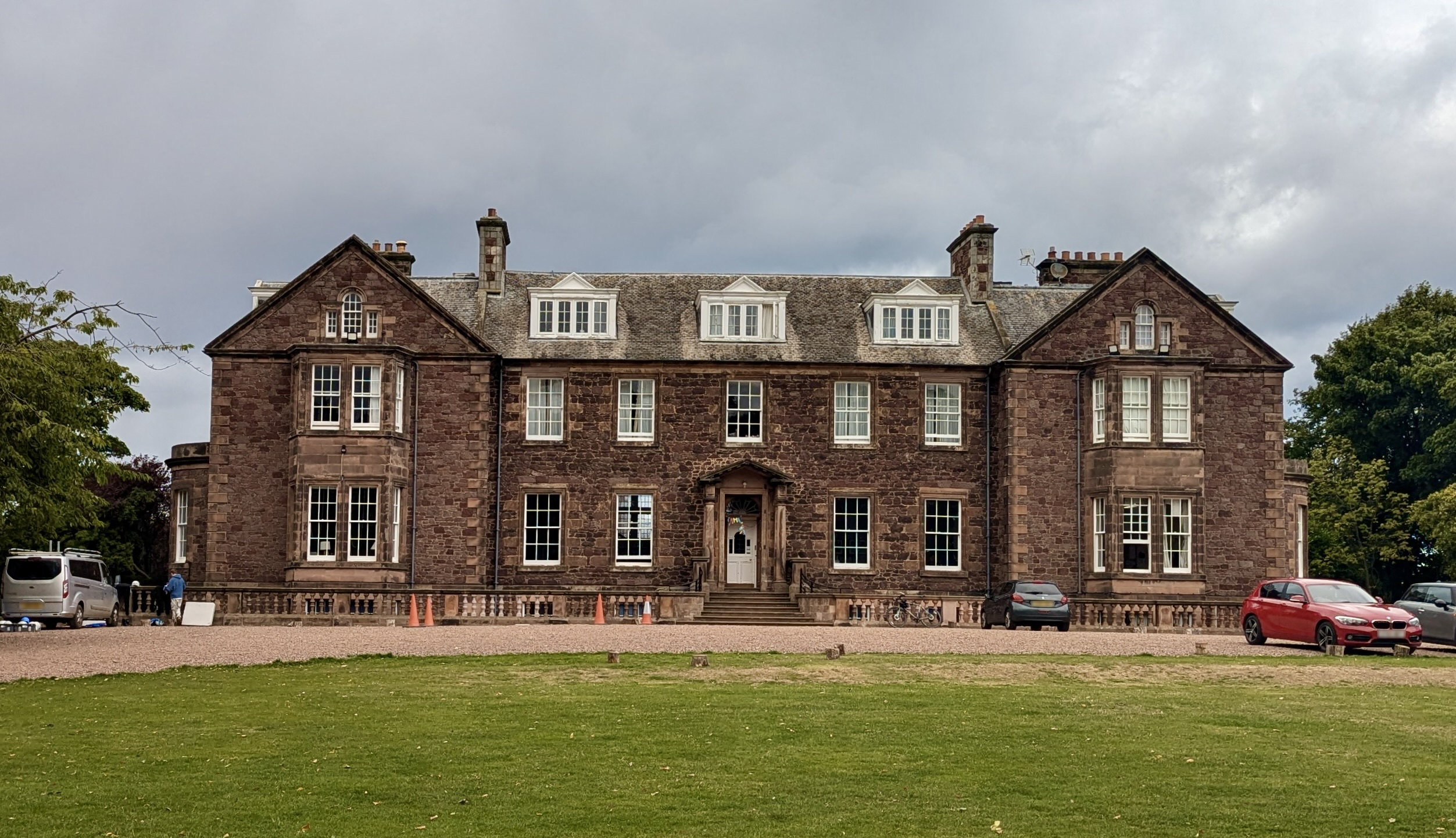
- The original schoolhouse at Belhaven in 2024

Location
- Belhaven Road; Dunbar, East Lothian, EH42 1NN; Scotland; 56.0007°N 2.5358°W

Information
- Type: Preparatory school Day & boarding school
- Motto: Be Creative, Be Courteous, Be Courageous, Be Belhaven
- Established: 4th May, 1923
- Headmaster: Neil Tomlin, OBE
- Gender: Co-educational
- Age: 4 to 13
- Enrolment: 168 (2026)
- Houses: Belhaven has 4 'Patrols' - Lions, Owls, Wolves and Woodpeckers
- Colour: Dark Blue/Light Blue
- Publication: https://www.belhavenhill.com/The-Bugle/
- Former pupils: Old Belhavians
- Website: https://www.belhavenhill.com/

Belhaven Hill School is a private co-educational preparatory school for boarding and day pupils aged 4 to 13, located in Dunbar, East Lothian, Scotland, approximately 30 minutes east of Edinburgh on the East Lothian coast. The School is one of a handful of prep schools in the UK to offer full fortnightly boarding.

The current headmaster is Neil Tomlin, OBE.

Belhaven Hill School's history begins in 1923, when it was founded by Brian Simms. The main building was originally a private house and the School initially operated with just a small number of pupils and two staff. As of 2026, the School had 168 pupils of whom 96 were full boarders. Boarding is available from the age of 7.

Belhaven provides buses to Dumfries, Perth and Stonehaven for exeat weekends, as well as an accompanied train service to London. The School also organises accompanied travel to Edinburgh, Glasgow and Newcastle airports. Daily buses operate across East Lothian and down to the Scottish Borders, as well as North Northumberland.

The School's grounds stretch to 20 acres.

== School expansion ==
In 2015, the School introduced Form 6 (Year 3) for pupils aged 7. Building on this experience, it subsequently extended its provision to children aged 4 to 6 through the establishment of a pre-preparatory department in 2022. The 'Pre-Prep' has a capacity of 30 pupils, with ten places in each year group.

As a result of Belhaven's Centenary Campaign in 2023, the School has recently built a MakerSpace, used for STEM and digital learning across all year groups.

== Notable alumni ==
- Hugh Buchanan (artist), Scottish artist
- James Chichester, Earl of Belfast (born 1990), aristocrat
- Alexander Elphinstone, 19th Lord Elphinstone (born 1980), aristocrat.
- Rear Admiral Sir Ronald Forrest (1923–2005), senior Royal Navy officer.
- Andro Linklater (1944–2013), writer and historian.
- Magnus Linklater (born 1942), journalist
- Hugh Trevor-Roper (1914–2003), British historian.
- Vice Admiral Sir George Vallings (1932–2007), senior Royal Navy officer.
- George Baillie-Hamilton, 14th Earl of Haddington (born 1985)
