= The Wind on the Moon =

1944 fantasy novel by Eric Linklater

- Front cover of first edition
- Author: Eric Linklater
- Illustrator: Nicolas Bentley
- Language: English
- Genre: Children's fantasy and comic adventure novel
- Publisher: Macmillan & Co.
- Publication date: 1944
- Publication place: United Kingdom
- Media type: Print (hardcover)
- Pages: 363 pp (first edition)
- OCLC: 684020
- LC Class: PZ7.L66286 Wi 1944

The Wind on the Moon: A story for children is a fantasy novel by Eric Linklater, published by Macmillan in 1944 with illustrations by Nicolas Bentley. The American division Macmillan US published an edition in the same year. Opening in the fictitious village of Midmeddlecum, evidently in contemporary rural England, it features two girls whose father is absent during a war. They pursue magical, bizarre, or dangerous experiences. A "wind on the moon" is said to be the cause, "making them behave badly for a year".

Linklater won the annual Carnegie Medal from the Library Association, recognizing the year's best children's book by a British subject.

== Plot summary ==
Major Palfrey is off to war. He warns his two daughters, Dinah and Dorinda, that while he is away they must behave themselves: "When there is wind on the moon, you must be very careful how you behave. Because if it is an ill wind and you behave badly, it will blow straight into your heart, and then you will behave badly for a long time to come." And so it proves: before long the girls are drinking a potion provided by the local witch and turning into kangaroos, getting stuck in the zoo, and staging an escape along with their new friends, a golden puma and a silver falcon.

Their appetite for naughtiness and cleverness whetted, Dinah and Dorinda turn their attention to freeing their dancing master, Casimir Corvo, from jail. And then comes their greatest adventure: Count Hulagu Bloot, the tyrant of Bombardy – who loves torturing people and eating peppermint creams – has captured their father and imprisoned him in the dungeons of Bloot's castle. The two girls, together with their puma friend and their beloved dancing teacher, smuggle themselves from England to Bombardy in a room made of furniture hidden inside a huge removal van and stage a dramatic rescue.

Awards
Preceded by The Little Grey Men	Carnegie Medal recipient 1944	Succeeded by The Little White Horse
