= Bob Linklater =

Australian rugby league footballer

Personal information
- Full name: Robert Stephen Linklater
- Born: 14 February 1893; Sydney, New South Wales
- Died: 9 June 1953 (aged 60)

Playing information
- Position: Fullback
Club
Years	Team	Pld	T	G	FG	P
1915–19	Eastern Suburbs	52	0	0	0	0
1923	South Sydney	1	0	0	0	0
	Total	53	0	0	0	0

Robert Linklater (1893–1953) was a rugby league footballer in the New South Wales Rugby League.

Linklater, a fullback, played first grade with Eastern Suburbs in the 1915 season, and lower grades until 1919. He also played with South Sydney in 1923.
