= Private Angelo =

1946 novel by Eric Linklater

- First edition
- Author: Eric Linklater
- Language: English
- Genre: satire
- Publisher: Jonathan Cape
- Publication date: 1946
- Publication place: Scotland
- Media type: paperback
- Pages: 272
- ISBN: 0-907675-61-1
- OCLC: 13668586

Private Angelo was written by Scottish author Eric Linklater and first published in 1946. It was made into a 1949 film of the same name by Pilgrim Pictures, produced by and starring Peter Ustinov, as well as adapted for the stage by Mike Maran Productions.

The novel covers the (mis)adventures of an Italian soldier during World War II. The offspring of an English father and an Italian mother, the eponymous main character of the novel found himself unwillingly drafted into the Italian army, with Count Pontefiore, Commanding Officer of the 914th Regiment of Tuscan Infantry, as his colonel. Not only was the Count Angelo's patron, but he was also a former lover of Angelo's mother.

The novel opened with the Italian armistice of 1943, and traced the fortunes of Angelo as he sought to survive and regain a measure of control over his life during the turmoils of the war.

Though distinctly lacking in dono di coraggio (gift of courage), an annoying but life-saving characteristic, Angelo strove to maintain his cheerfulness and beautiful voice in chaotic circumstances beyond his control.
