= Hugh Buchanan (artist) =

Scottish painter (born 1958)

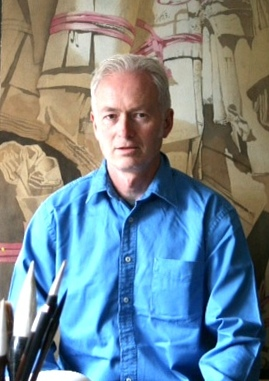
- Hugh Buchanan, 2015.
- Born: Hugh Ross Buchanan; 29 May 1958 (age 68); Edinburgh, Scotland
- Education: Edinburgh College of Art
- Known for: Painting, watercolour
- Spouse: Ann de Rohan

Hugh Buchanan (born 29 May 1958) is a Scottish watercolour painter, renowned for his detailed draughtsmanship and treatment of light and shadows in interiors, and for a sense of depth and space that is reminiscent of the work of Cotman and Piranesi.

== Early life ==
The son of Ian Buchanan, manager of Scottish and Newcastle Breweries, and Fiona Ross, a graduate of the Central School of Art and Design in London, he was born in Edinburgh in 1958. After preparatory school at Belhaven Hill School in Dunbar, he went on to study at Wellington College in Berkshire. In 1976 he entered the Edinburgh College of Art, gaining his BA in Drawing and Painting in 1980.

== Career ==
Subsequently he was granted travel scholarships to the Middle East and, later, North Italy and the Balkans. He has travelled regularly throughout Europe to visit and paint in watercolour buildings and interiors from the Renaissance to the Baroque. Over several years he worked on commissions for the National Trust and in 1987 was invited by the Prince of Wales to paint a series of interiors of Balmoral, later completing a further sequence at Highgrove in 1994. In 1988 he was commissioned by the House of Commons to paint four interiors in the Palace of Westminster. Hugh Buchanan’s paintings are in the Collections of the Queen, Queen Elizabeth the late Queen Mother, The Prince of Wales, the Victoria and Albert Museum, Edinburgh City Art Centre, the Palace of Westminster, the University of Edinburgh, the University of Aberdeen, the Bank of Scotland, the Royal Bank of Scotland, the Fleming Collection, Deutsche Bank, the National Trust for Scotland and the National Trust for England. In 2002 he was commissioned by the House of Lords to paint the lying in state of the Queen Mother at the Palace of Westminster. In 1987 he was one of Ten British Watercolourists shown at the Museo de Bellas Artes in Bilbao, Spain. In 1991 he exhibited at the Lincoln Center, New York. In November 1998 five works by Hugh Buchanan were included in the exhibition Princes as Patrons: The Art Collections of the Princes of Wales from the Renaissance to the Present Day shown at the National Museum and Gallery, Cardiff. In 2005/6 his paintings featured in Watercolours and Drawings from the Collection of Queen Elizabeth the Queen Mother, at the Palace of Holyroodhouse, Edinburgh and the Queen’s Gallery, London.

In 1994 Buchanan was given a major retrospective by the National Trust at Petworth House. His work has featured in two limited edition publications with accompanying texts by Peter Davidson: The Eloquence of Shadows (1994) and Winter Light (2010). In spring 2000 he was a major participant in The Art of Memory: contemporary painters in search of Marcel Proust, a theme exhibition which with new contributions by the artists participating travelled to the National Theatre on the South Bank in January 2001. He took part in the theme exhibitions Roma in 2003, Lair of the Leopard (2005), Everyone Sang: a view of Siegfried Sassoon and his world (2006), РОДИНА: contemporary painters from the West winter in Russia (2008), That gong-tormented sea: contemporary painters pursue the idea and reality of Byzantium (2009) and Jumping for Joyce: Contemporary painters revel in the world of James Joyce (2013).

Buchanan's exhibition of libraries, Enlightenment, was shown at the University of Aberdeen in 2009. In 2010 his exhibition Words and Deeds explored the archives at Drumlanrig and Traquair in the Scottish borders. In 2013, The Esterhazy Archive, paintings of documents at Forchtenstein south of Vienna, one of the properties of the Hungarian princely family Esterházy, was shown at Summerhall in Edinburgh. In the same year he was invited by the National Library of Scotland to paint a series of compositions of the John Murray Archive which were exhibited at the Library in 2015.

In June 2017 he was invited by The Scottish Gallery to exhibit a major collection of watercolour paintings entitled New Town in celebration of the 250th anniversary of the New Town in Edinburgh. The exhibition is devoted to the interplay of light and space both in interiors and in the external architectural features of these Georgian houses. The catalogue of the exhibition contains essays by Duncan Macmillan, Adam Wilkinson, Director of Edinburgh World Heritage, Ian Gow, Chief Curator Emeritus of the National Trust for Scotland and Peter Davidson of Campion Hall, Oxford.

In November 2018, the John Martin Gallery in London hosted an exhibition of his watercolours entitled Fragments of a Classical Twilight, showing details of late 19th and early 20th century Beaux Arts buildings in London, in Philadelphia and in Rome, and of the play of light in their interiors.

== Personal life ==
He lives with his wife and their three children in East Lothian, which is not far from Edinburgh.

== See also ==
- List of Scottish artists
