= Tina Packer =

British stage director and actress (1938–2026)

- Born: Christina Roberta Packer; 28 September 1938; Wolverhampton, Staffordshire, England
- Died: 9 January 2026 (aged 87); Pittsfield, Massachusetts, U.S.
- Education: Royal Academy of Dramatic Art
- Occupations: Stage director; actress; writer
- Years active: 1964–2026
- Known for: The Web of Fear; Two a Penny; David Copperfield
- Spouses: Laurie Asprey (m. 1962; div. 1980) Dennis Krausnick (m. 1998; died 2018)
- Children: 1
- Awards: Guggenheim Fellowship (1994)

Christina Roberta Packer (28 September 1938 – 9 January 2026) was a British stage director and actress based in the United States. Educated at the Royal Academy of Dramatic Art, she originally worked as an actress. She starred in the BBC television serial David Copperfield. After she quit acting and became a stage director in the United States, she founded the Shakespearean theatre company Shakespeare & Company, serving as its artistic director from its second foundation in 1978 until 2009.

== Life and career ==
Christina Packer was born in Wolverhampton on 28 September 1938. She was raised in Nottingham and educated at a Quaker school, as well as West Bridgford Grammar School. She later spent two years in France with an older man she had a relationship with before they broke up.

Originally working at a magazine editorial office, she decided to go into acting because "I suppose I'm a natural born exhibitionist." Returning to the United Kingdom, she was educated at the Royal Academy of Dramatic Art, graduating in 1964 with the Ronson Award for Most Promising Actress. She then worked at the Royal Shakespeare Company, which she had visited in her youth, as an associate artist. Despite her contract lasting three years, she left early to star in David Copperfield, where she starred as Dora Spenlow. She also appeared in Doctor Who, as well as in the 1967 movie Two a Penny. However, she felt that she lacked a voice as a performer, and after her scenes in an adaptation of Washington Square were cut from the final broadcast, she quit acting. In 1971, she began work in the London Academy of Music and Dramatic Art, where she was a stage director and teacher, before she moved to the United States to direct Shakespeare plays.

She started Shakespeare & Company, an experimental Shakespearean theatre company funded by the CBS Foundation and the Ford Foundation in 1974; she named the company after a bookstore of the same name she often visited during her time in Paris. After a poor reception in the United States and depletion of funding, she took a brief hiatus from stage direction. In 1978, she directed Les Femmes Savantes at the Kennedy Center and then restarted Shakespeare & Company at The Mount in Lenox, Massachusetts, wanting a traditional Shakespearean theatre. She was the founding artistic director of Shakespeare & Company, holding the position until stepping down in 2009.

Her first directed performance for the company had to be done outdoors because the mansion had not been restored yet. Despite initial reception being mostly lackluster, it was praised in The Village Voice and became well known in New York City. As a stage director, she also used color-blind casting in Shakespearean plays, allowing Black and Asian actors to appear in traditionally White roles. In 1985, a book from Helen Epstein on Packer and the company, Tina Packer Builds A Theater was published, and WGBH-TV aired a documentary centred around her, Sex, Violence and Poetry. In 2008, Anne Fliotsos and Wendy Vierow called her "one of the foremost directors of Shakespeare in the United States". She won the 2019 Shakespeare Theatre Association Lifetime Achievement Award.

In 1991, she directed a version of Hamlet at North Shore Music Theatre, set in West Africa and performed by a predominantly-Black American cast. In 1993, she directed Boston Center for the Arts productions of John L. Balderston's Berkeley Square and Tom Kempinski's Duet for One, as well as a Canadian Stage Company production of Marisha Chamberlain's Scheherazade. She was also artistic director of the Boston Shakespeare Company. She also directed several adaptations of the works of Edith Wharton, who had lived in The Mount herself. She also did acting in addition to directing, calling directing "such a sedentary occupation".

Packer also worked as a Shakespeare teacher in higher education, including at the Columbia University MBA programme. In 1994, she was awarded a Guggenheim Fellowship. She also published Power Plays: Shakespeare's Lessons in Leadership and Management (2001), Tales from Shakespeare (2004), the book of literary criticism Women of Will (2016), and Shakespeare & Company: When Action Is Eloquence (2020).

=== Relationships ===
In 1962 she married actor Laurie Asprey, with whom she had a son, Shakespeare & Company actor Jason Asprey. The couple separated around the time she left acting, but did not formally divorce until the early 1980s. In 1998, she married Dennis Krausnick, a stage acting educator and Shakespeare & Company co-founder; they remained married until his death in 2018.

Around the mid-1960s, she resided in Woodthorpe, Nottinghamshire, and later in Stockbridge, Massachusetts.

=== Death ===
Packer died, aged 87, on 9 January 2026 at the Berkshire Medical Center in Pittsfield, Massachusetts.

== Filmography ==
=== Film ===
Year	Title	Role	Notes	Ref.
1967	Two a Penny	Gladys	Feature film	
1970	Praise Marx and Pass the Ammunition	Air Hostess	Feature film	

=== Television ===
Year	Title	Role	Notes	Ref.
1964	No Hiding Place	Ann	Episode: "Real Class"	
1964	Thursday Theatre	First girl	Episode: "Point of Departure"	
1965	The Avengers	Suzanne (uncredited)	Episode: "Dial a Deadly Number"	
1966	David Copperfield	Dora Spenlow	8 episodes	
1968	Doctor Who	Anne Travers	Serial: The Web of Fear	
1968	Boy Meets Girl	Sister Tannis March	Episode: "The Enchanted Shore"	
1972	Crime of Passion			
2013	Charlie Rose	Self — Guest	1 episode	

== Awards and nominations ==
Year	Award	Result	References
1994	Guggenheim Fellowship	Won	
2019	Shakespeare Theatre Association Lifetime Achievement Award	Won	

== Sources ==
- Fliotsos, Anne; Vierow, Wendy (2008). American Women Stage Directors of the Twentieth Century. University of Illinois Press. ISBN 978-0-252-03226-4.
- Harris, Patricia (2022). New England's Notable Women: The Stories and Sites of Trailblazers and Achievers. Rowman & Littlefield. ISBN 978-1-4930-6602-5.
