= Marjorie Linklater =

Scottish campaigner (1909–1997)

- Born: Marjorie MacIntyre; 19 March 1909; Edinburgh, Scotland
- Died: 29 June 1997 (aged 88); Kirkwall, Orkney, Scotland
- Citizenship: British
- Education: St George's School, Edinburgh; Downe House School
- Alma mater: Royal Academy of Dramatic Art
- Occupation: Campaigner
- Years active: 1930s–1997
- Known for: Campaigned for the arts and environment of Orkney
- Spouse: Eric Linklater (m. 1933; died 1974)
- Children: 4
- Father: Ian MacIntyre

Marjorie Linklater (née MacIntyre; 19 March 1909 – 29 June 1997) was a Scottish campaigner for the arts and environment on the island of Orkney. She gave up acting at the Royal Academy of Dramatic Art to get involved in conservation, education, and health matters as a county councillor for Ross and Cromarty County Council. In 1975, Linklater was elected chairman of the Orkney Heritage Society, devoting herself to campaigning for the arts environment, local heritage, and politics. She successfully opposed the mining of uranium and the dumping of nuclear waste off Orkney's west coast and was a founding member of the St Magnus Festival. The Orkney Heritage Society named a senior school award in Linklater's honour following her death.

== Biography ==
=== Early life ===
Linklater was born to Scottish international rugby player and future Unionist Party MP Ian MacIntyre and his first wife Ida Van der Gucht on 19 March 1909 at 19 Northumberland Street, Edinburgh. She was one of six children in the family. Linklater was educated sparsely at St George's School, Edinburgh and Downe House School, Berkshire, before enrolling at London's Royal Academy of Dramatic Art. She played a number of minor roles in the West End theatre scene, but decided she was not suited to be an actress and went back to Edinburgh in 1930.

=== Career ===
Back in Edinburgh, Linklater successfully campaigned with the actor Michael MacOwan for the establishment of the National Theatre of Scotland, and had a role in the local community, producing winning plays in drama festivals and played the cello in an orchestra. After moving to Easter Ross in 1947 from living in Orkney since 1933, she became a county councillor of Ross and Cromarty County Council in 1953, getting involved conservation, education, and health matters. Linklater helped to found a secondary school in the Gaelic-speaking fishing village of Plockton, meaning children did not need to travel long distances for their education. She secured the post of headteacher at the school for the Gaelic poet Sorley MacLean, and was successful in having public lavatories built-in popular tourist locations, earning her the nickname "Ross-shire's lavatory queen". Linklater also served as a member of the Scottish Arts Council from 1957 to 1963, the Inverness Hospital Board, the Advisory Council of the Highlands and Islands Development Board, and the Council of European Architectural Heritage Year.

In 1975, she returned to Orkney, saying in an interview "I have decided to give up sex and take up committees." Linklater was elected chairman of the Orkney Heritage Society in 1976, and immediately got involved in a campaign to counter the duo threats of the nuclear sector's plan to mine uranium on Orkney's mainland and dumping nuclear waste off the island's west coast. She followed up by contesting plans to dump nuclear waste at sea, and later successfully convinced the oil industry to fund a qualified resident archaeologist who supervised Orkney's rich prehistoric heritage full-time. In 1976, Linklater and Peter Maxwell Davies among others co-founded the St Magnus Festival, and conceived, performed, and produced the Johnsmas Foy as the festival's primary literary event. In the 1970s, she joined the Scottish National Party (SNP), becoming the Orkney and Shetland's branch chairman and was the agent for Winnie Ewing, the MEP for the Highlands and Islands.

At age 80, Linklater confronted a farmer who took sand from a beach, causing him to drive his digger towards her and verbally abused her. She said in response "Well, make up your mind. I can't be both." Linklater distributed pamphlets for the SNP, canvassing for the local candidate at the 1992 United Kingdom general election. She worked with Laura Grimond to restore the 8th-century St Boniface Kirk, was a founding trustee and chairperson of the Pier Arts Centre and was a founder member of the Orkney Folk Festival. Linklater also housed the local candidate for the Natural Law Party during the 1997 United Kingdom general election.

== Personal life ==
She was a Christian, went to church, and was a Scottish nationalist. Linklater was married to the writer Eric Linklater from 1 June 1933 until his death on 7 November 1974. They had four children (two sons and two daughters): including the biographer and journalist Andro Linklater and the newspaper editor and arts administrator Magnus Linklater. She died of cancer and heart failure on the evening of 29 June 1997 at her home in Kirkwall, Orkney.

== Legacy ==
In 2000, the Orkney Heritage Society established The Marjorie Linklater Writing Award in her memory. The award is presented to senior school pupils in the fifth or sixth year of education and to similarly aged students at Orkney College "for a short piece of creative writing" with judges including members of the Linklater family.
