= Eric Linklater =

Scottish fiction, history and travel writer (1899–1974)

Eric Linklater CBE
- Born: Eric Robert Russell Linklater; 8 March 1899; Penarth, Vale of Glamorgan, Wales
- Died: 7 November 1974 (aged 75); Aberdeen, Scotland
- Education: Aberdeen Grammar School; University of Aberdeen
- Occupations: Writer, poet
- Spouse: Marjorie Linklater (m. 1933)
- Children: 4
- Writing career
- Genres: Military history, travel
- Notable awards: Carnegie Medal (1944)

Eric Robert Russell Linklater CBE (8 March 1899 – 7 November 1974) was a Welsh-born Scottish poet, fiction writer, military historian, and travel writer. For The Wind on the Moon, a children's fantasy novel, he won the 1944 Carnegie Medal from the Library Association for the year's best children's book by a British subject.

== Early life ==
Linklater was born in Penarth, Vale of Glamorgan, Wales to Orcadian Robert Baikie Linklater (1865–1916), a master mariner, and Mary Elizabeth (c. 1867–1957). He was educated at Aberdeen Grammar School and the University of Aberdeen, where he was president of the Aberdeen University Debater. He spent many years in Orkney and identified with the islands, where his father had been born. His maternal grandfather was a Swedish-born sea captain, so he had Scandinavian origins through both parents. Linklater is an Orcadian name derived from the Old Norse; throughout his life he maintained a sympathetic interest in Scandinavia.

== Career ==
Linklater served in the Black Watch in 1917–1918 before receiving a bullet wound, then became a sniper. His experience of trench warfare is described in his memoir Fanfare for a Tin Hat (1970), and at one remove in his 1938 novel The Impregnable Women, describing an imaginary war against France.

As an undergraduate at Aberdeen University in 1922, Linklater wrote the first musical comedy for the Aberdeen Student Show, Stella, the Bajanella, with music by J. S. Taylor. Twenty-four years later, during his tenure as Rector of the University of Aberdeen, his play To Meet the Macgregors was performed as the 1946 Student Show. Abandoning medical studies in Aberdeen, Linklater spent 1925–1927 in Bombay, India as an assistant editor of The Times of India, then travelled extensively before returning to Aberdeen as an assistant to the Professor of English and spending 1928–1930 as a Commonwealth fellow at Cornell and Berkeley.

As a writer, Linklater's career took off in 1929. His success began in his early career years. Altogether he published 23 novels, three volumes of stories, two of verse, ten plays, three works of autobiography and 23 of essays and histories. His third novel, Juan in America, was a hugely popular picaresque, with some of the extravagance of Byron's Don Juan, based on experiences of the absurdity of the Prohibition era, with its resulting gangsterism. It is sprinkled with memorable remarks: "I've been married six months. She looks like a million dollars, but she only knows a hundred and twenty words and she's only got two ideas in her head. The other one's hats." The character returns in Juan in China (1937).

Linklater also wrote three children's novels: The Wind on the Moon (1944), The Pirates in the Deep Green Sea (1949) and Karina With Love (1958). The first is about two sisters, whose adventures include becoming kangaroos and rescuing their father from a Hitlerian tyrant, enlisting the anthropomorphic help of a puma and a falcon. Its storytelling skill and treatment of wider themes such as imprisonment and freedom won it a Carnegie Medal.

Linklater's Orcadian and Scottish sympathies led him to literary and political involvement in the Scottish Renaissance, culminating in his unsuccessful National Party of Scotland candidacy at the 1933 East Fife by-election. Magnus Merriman (1934) was an acerbic fictionalised description of the debacle. He settled in Orkney with his new wife in 1933.

The author's attitude to war and the moral implications of diplomacy became sharper in Judas (1939), which explores the concepts of loyalty and treachery amid a strong indictment of the desertion of Czechoslovakia by Britain and France in the name of appeasement. The worsening international situation led to expansion of the Territorial Army (TA). It was decided to raise new units of anti-aircraft and coastal artillery in Orkney to defend the Scapa Flow naval base, with a fortress company of the Royal Engineers to support them. The Lord Lieutenant of Orkney and Shetland asked Linklater, still a Reserve officer, to raise one of these units, and he chose the 'Sappers'. He was commissioned as captain and second-in-command of the Orkney Fortress Royal Engineers on 16 September 1938, but was effective commander. The unit consisted of a single company headquartered at Kirkwall, mainly to operate the electrical generators for the Scapa Flow defences and man the searchlights for the guns. The men were called out from farms and villages shortly before the outbreak of World War II and served through the winter of 1939/1940, when Orkney received a number of Luftwaffe raids. By mid-1940 reinforcements were pouring into the Orkney and Shetland defences and Linklater's command was broken up.

As a well-known author, Linklater was soon employed by the War Office Public Relations department to write official "instant histories" of the war, such as The Defence of Calais (1941) and The Northern Garrisons (1941), which described the life of British troops stationed in remote locations, including Orkney. This culminated in service in Italy in 1944–1945, which led to his novel about an equivocal Italian soldier, Private Angelo (1946), which contrasts nationalism with a sense of national community: "I hope you will not liberate us out of existence", is a remark Angelo makes. As one reference work puts it, Angelo "lacks 'the great and splendid gift' of courage, and consequently makes a poor soldier, although he is especially assiduous in retreating, and ultimately deserts." In 1951 Linklater published a semi-official account of The Campaign in Italy and also visited the Korean War for the War Office as a temporary lieutenant colonel.

Linklater moved back to the Scottish mainland in 1947 to Pitcalzean House, near Hill of Fearn in Ross-shire. His abilities and reputation as a novelist waned somewhat, but he turned to historical writing, and with great effect to autobiography.

== Recognition ==
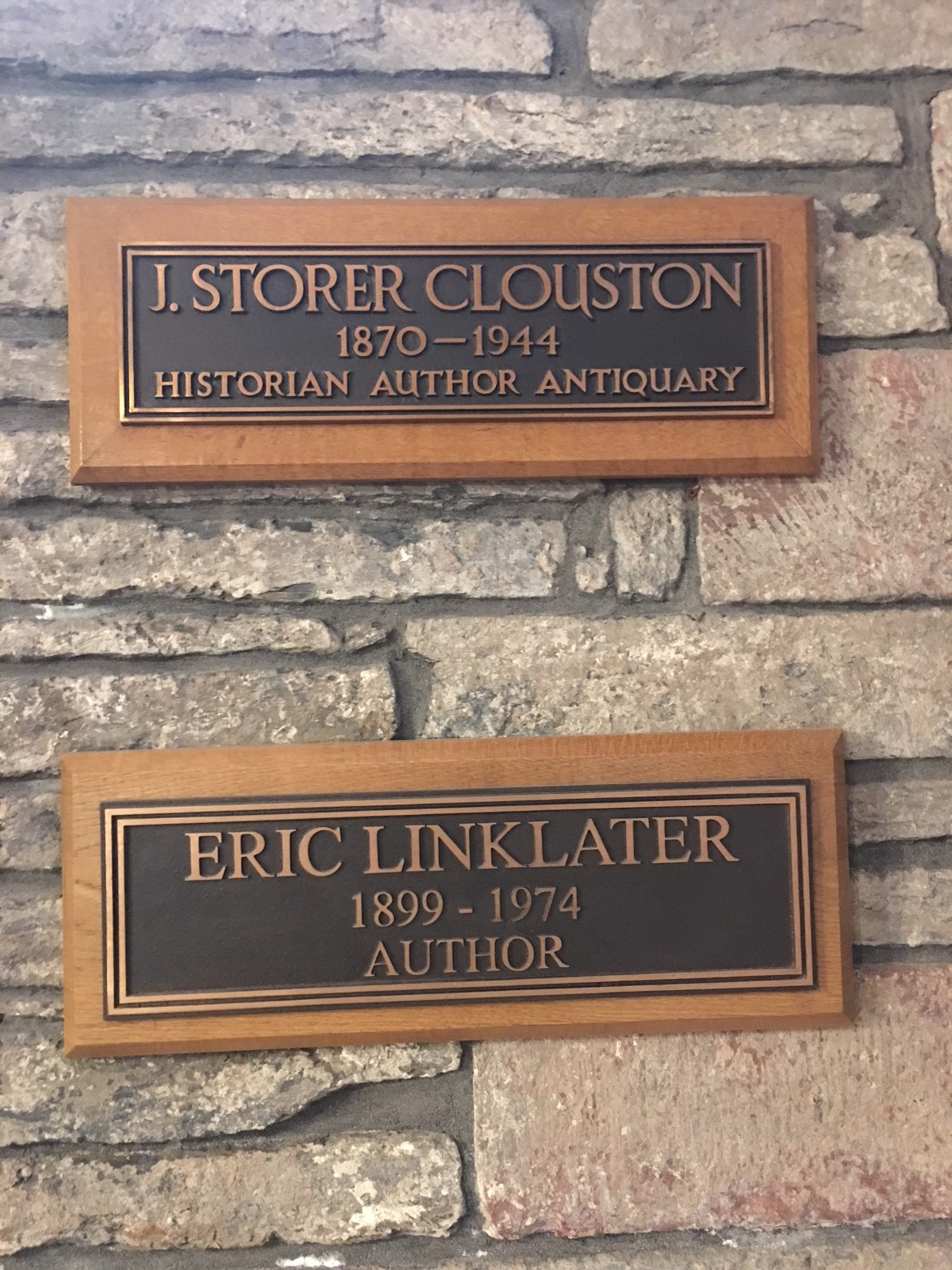
Memorial to Eric Linklater in St Magnus Cathedral, Kirkwall, Orkney

Linklater was Rector of the University of Aberdeen in 1945–1948 and received an honorary degree from the university in 1949. He was appointed CBE in 1954, served as deputy lieutenant of Ross and Cromarty in 1968–1973, and was elected a fellow of the Royal Society of Edinburgh in 1971.

== Family and death ==
On 1 June 1933 Linklater married Marjorie MacIntyre (1909–1997), an Edinburgh-born, English-educated actress and campaigner for the arts and the environment. She later became active in local politics and on the Scottish Arts Council in 1957–1963. They had four children: Kristin Linklater, Magnus Linklater, Andro Linklater and Alison Linklater.

Linklater died in Aberdeen on 7 November 1974 from thrombosis at the age of 75. He was buried in the churchyard at St Michael's, Harray, on Mainland, Orkney.

== Main works ==
Children's fiction

- The Wind on the Moon (1944) – winner of the Carnegie Medal
- The Pirates in the Deep Green Sea (1949)

Other fiction

- White Maa's Saga (1929)
- Poet's Pub (1929) – adapted as film Poet's Pub (1949)
- Juan in America (1931)
- The Men of Ness (1932)
- The Crusader's Key (1933)
- Magnus Merriman (1934)
- Ripeness is All (1935)
- Juan in China (1937)
- The Sailor's Holiday (1937)
- The Impregnable Women (1938)
- Judas (1939)
- Private Angelo (1946) – war satire ISBN 0-907675-61-1
- Sealskin Trousers and Other Stories (1947)
- A Spell for Old Bones (1949)
- Love in Albania (1949, play)
- Mr. Byculla (1950)
- Laxdale Hall (1951) – adapted as film of same title (1953)
- The Mortimer Touch (1952, play)
- The House of Gair (1953)
- The Faithful Ally (1954)
- The Dark of Summer (1956)
- A Sociable Plover and Other Stories and Conceits (1957)
- Position at Noon (1958)
- The Merry Muse (1959)
- Husband of Delilah (1962) – adapted as film Samson and Delilah (1984)
- A Man Over Forty (1963)
- A Terrible Freedom (1966)
- The Goose Girl and Other Stories, selected and edited by Andro Linklater (1991)

Non-fiction

- "Under the hammer and sickle". Blackwood's Magazine. 222 (1343): 289–312. 1927.
- Ben Jonson and King James: Biography and Portrait (1931)
- Mary, Queen of Scots (1934)
- Robert the Bruce (1934)
- The Lion and the Unicorn: What England Has Meant to Scotland (1935)
- The Man on My Back (1941) – autobiography
- The Northern Garrisons (1941)
- The Defence of Calais (1941)
- The Highland Division (1942)
- The Art of Adventure (1947) – essays
- The Campaign in Italy (1951)
- Figures in a Landscape (1952)
- A Year of Space (1953) – travel
- The Ultimate Viking (1955) – history of Sweyn Asleifsson
- Orkney and Shetland: An Historical, Geographical, Social, and Scenic Survey (1965)
- The Prince in the Heather (1965) – story of Bonnie Prince Charlie's escape
- The Conquest of England (1966)
- The Survival of Scotland: A New History of Scotland from Roman Times to the Present Day (1968)
- Fanfare for a Tin Hat: A Third Essay in Autobiography (1970)
- The Voyage of the Challenger (1972)

Other

- The Devil's in the News (1929) – drama
- A Dragon Laughed and Other Poems (1930)

== Reviews ==
- Ritchie, Harry (1981), Buchan and Linklater, which includes a review of Laxdale Hall, in Murray, Glen (ed.), Cencrastus No. 7, Winter 1981–82, p. 46, ISSN 0264-0856

Academic offices
Preceded by Stafford Cripps	Rector of the University of Aberdeen; 1945–1948	Succeeded by Baron Tweedsmuir
