= Magnus Linklater =

British journalist, writer and newspaper editor (born 1942)

Magnus Duncan Linklater, CBE (born 21 February 1942) is a Scottish journalist, writer, and former newspaper editor.

== Early life and education ==
Linklater was born in Orkney, and is the son of Scottish writer Eric Linklater and arts campaigner Marjorie MacIntyre. He was brought up in Easter Ross, attending the local school at Nigg before moving to Belhaven Hill School in Dunbar, East Lothian, and then on to Eton College. He continued his studies with courses at Albert Ludwigs University of Freiburg in Germany and the Sorbonne in Paris, before studying for a degree at Trinity Hall, Cambridge, where he graduated with second-class honours in modern languages. He is of part Swedish descent, through his father Eric. His son is Archie Linklater.

== Journalist ==
Linklater's career in journalism began in 1964 as a reporter with the Daily Express. This was followed by a period as reporter, then editor of the Londoner's Diary on the Evening Standard, before he moved to The Sunday Times in 1969, where he was magazine editor, news editor and executive editor (features). He had a central role in the Hitler diaries scandal. He remained at The Sunday Times until 1983. This was followed by three years at The Observer, where he was Managing Editor (News) before he was recruited to launch and edit the London Daily News, a short-lived newspaper owned by Robert Maxwell. Linklater returned to Scotland at the start of 1988 to become editor of The Scotsman, running the newspaper until 1994, when he left to become a freelance writer, and columnist for The Times. In 2007 he was appointed Scottish Editor of The Times, a position he held until 2012.

Since then he has continued as a regular contributor to The Times. From 1998 to 2007, he wrote a weekly column for The Scotsman's sister paper, Scotland on Sunday. Between 1994 and 1997 he presented the weekly discussion programme Eye to Eye on BBC Radio Scotland, and has written a number of books, including an account of the hoax autobiography of Howard Hughes, a life of Jeremy Thorpe, and an investigation of the Nazi war criminal Klaus Barbie. He has also written books on Scottish history and politics.

He was appointed as chairman of the Scottish Arts Council in 1996, holding the post for five years, and is currently chairman of the Little Sparta Trust, which maintains Little Sparta, the garden of the late Ian Hamilton Finlay, in the Pentland Hills. He is President of the Saltire Society, and former Chairman of Horsecross Arts Limited, which manages Perth Concert Hall and Perth Theatre. In December 2019, He resigned along with other board members following accusations of financial mismanagement of the service.

Linklater was a candidate for the position of Rector of the University of Aberdeen in 1999 and Rector of University of Edinburgh in the 2006 election, finishing second, behind Scottish Green Party politician Mark Ballard. His wife was Veronica Linklater, Baroness Linklater (d. 2022), a member of the House of Lords from 1997 to 2016; he is a Trustee of her family estate in Perthshire.

He was a trustee of The New School, Butterstone, an educational and therapeutic provision for children failed by mainstream education. The school was forced to close in November 2018 in controversial circumstances and a subsequent enquiry identified significant failings in both management and governance.

In the 2001 Teissier affair, in which Elizabeth Teissier was awarded a doctorate in sociology for a thesis defending astrology, Linklater succinctly summarised that "the core problem of the incident was that '[Teissier] really believes in astrology. And there is the rub. If you seriously believe that the stars rule our lives, you have abandoned the most basic tenet of science which is knowledge obtained by observation and experiment.'" (Linklater, 2001, cited in Campion, 2016, pp. 90–91) Linklater was criticised for making Teissier into an "ontological criminal: what mattered for Teissier's academic qualification was not the quality of her work but her private beliefs" based on Linklater's alleged position that "the only source of knowledge can be science; the social sciences and humanities are automatically inferior explanatory models." The criticisms of Teissier's work, however, were not based on her astrological beliefs but on the poor quality of its scientific content and lack of legitimate sociology.

Linklater was appointed Commander of the Order of the British Empire (CBE) in the 2013 New Year Honours for services to the arts and media in Scotland.

== Personal life ==
Linklater lives in the New Town of Edinburgh. His house was badly damaged by a fire on New Year's Day 2006, destroying much of his art collection, including paintings by Samuel Peploe and William George Gillies.

Media offices
Preceded by Chris Baur	Editor of The Scotsman; 1988–1994	Succeeded by Andrew Jaspan
